= 1999 World Professional Pool Championship =

Pool Tournament in Wales

World Pool Championship 1999
Tournament information
- Sport: 9-ball
- Location: Cardiff, Wales
- Dates: July 18, 1999–July 26, 1999
- Tournament format: Round robin / Single Elimination
- Host(s): WPA World Nine-ball Championship, Matchroom Pool
- Participants: 96

Final positions
- Champion: (Philippines) Efren Reyes
- Runner-up: (Chinese Taipei) Chang Hao-ping

The 1999 World Pool Championship was a professional pool championship that took place in 1999 in Cardiff, Wales. The event was billed as a world championship by Matchroom Sport as an alternative to the World Pool-Billiard Association's (WPA) 1999 WPA World Nine-ball Championship, won by Nick Varner. Despite there being two world titles for the same discipline in 1999, both are considered as valid in 1999 by the WPA.

The event was won by Efren Reyes, who defeated Chang Hao-ping in the final 17–8. At the time of the event, it was not recognised as a world championship, however, after the event was well received, the WPA worked with Matchroom Sport to sponsor and present later versions of the event, and the 1999 event was retrospectively recognised as a world championship. The championships were merged in 2000, but were also held in Wales.

== Knockout round ==
Round of 64 (Race to 9)
(United States) Johnny Archer	9
(Canada) Ronnie Wiseman	5
(Canada) Luc Salvas	3
(United States) Kim Davenport	9
(Sweden) Tom Storm	6
(Chinese Taipei) Chang Hao-Ping	9
(Chinese Taipei) Kun Fang Lee	9
(Japan) Takahashi Kunihiko	8
(Germany) Harald Stolka	8
(Japan) Takashi Toda	9
(China) Lee Wei Chen	9
(Canada) Paul Potier	8
(United States) Tommy Kennedy	2
(Japan) Hisashi Yamamoto	9
(Sweden) Marcus Chamat	4
(Germany) Ralph Eckert	9
(Australia) Quinten Hann	5
(Philippines) Leonardo Andam	9
(Poland) Mariusz Roter	2
(United Kingdom) Steve Knight	9
(Germany) Bernd Jahnke	9
(Japan) Yutaka Fukuda	7
(United States) Jon Kucharo	4
(Japan) Satoshi Kawabata	9
(Chinese Taipei) Chao Fong-Pang	9
(Japan) Takeshi Okumura	4
(United States) Earl Strickland	3
(United States) Fang Hsiao Lang	9
(United States) Randy Pruman	3
(Russia) Evgeny Stalev	9
(United States) Mike Coltrain	9
(United Kingdom) Andy Richardson	5
(United States) Jim Rempe	9
(Switzerland) Sam Cleaman	6
(Philippines) Francisco Bustamante	9
(United States) Tony Ellin	1
(United States) Corey Deuel	9
(Mexico) Ernesto Dominguez	1
(Italy) Fabio Petroni	9
(China) Shin-Young Park	5
(Luxembourg) Marc Holtz	6
(Netherlands) Michael Schmidt	9
(Philippines) Rodolfo Luat	5
(United States) Tang Hoa	9
(Canada) Alain Martel	6
(United States) Jeremy Jones	9
(United Kingdom) Steve Davis	8
(United States) Mike Lebron	9
(Germany) Oliver Ortmann	9
(Malta) Tony Drago	8
(Chinese Taipei) Lu Hui-Chan	9
(Luxembourg) Steve Leisen	5
(Chinese Taipei) Min Wai Chin	7
(Netherlands) Alex Lely	9
(Japan) Akikumo Toshikawa	9
(Denmark) Rico Diks	7
(Germany) Thomas Engert	8
(United Kingdom) Jimmy White	9
(South Korea) Young-Hwa Jeong	6
(Philippines) Efren Reyes	9
(United Kingdom) Steve James	9
(Canada) Alex Pagulayan	6
(Germany) Ralf Souquet	9
(United States) Charlie Williams	7

Round of 32 (Race to 9)
(United States) Johnny Archer	9
(United States) Kim Davenport	7
(Chinese Taipei) Chang Hao-Ping	9
(Chinese Taipei) Kun Fang Lee	5
(Japan) Takashi Toda	9
(China) Lee Wei Chen	3
(Japan) Hisashi Yamamoto	9
(Germany) Ralph Eckert	3
(Philippines) Leonardo Andam	1
(United Kingdom) Steve Knight	9
(Germany) Bernd Jahnke	3
(Japan) Satoshi Kawabata	9
(Chinese Taipei) Chao Fong-Pang	9
(United States) Fang Hsiao Lang	7
(Russia) Evgeny Stalev	9
(United States) Mike Coltrain	6
(United States) Jim Rempe	8
(Philippines) Francisco Bustamante	9
(United States) Corey Deuel	5
(Italy) Fabio Petroni	9
(Netherlands) Michael Schmidt	9
(United States) Tang Hoa	7
(United States) Jeremy Jones	8
(United States) Mike Lebron	9
(Germany) Oliver Ortmann	8
(Chinese Taipei) Lu Hui-Chan	9
(Netherlands) Alex Lely	3
(Japan) Akikumo Toshikawa	9
(United Kingdom) Jimmy White	8
(Philippines) Efren Reyes	9
(United Kingdom) Steve James	5
(Germany) Ralf Souquet	9

Round of 16 (Race to 11)
(United States) Johnny Archer	5
(Chinese Taipei) Chang Hao-Ping	11
(Japan) Takashi Toda	6
(Japan) Hisashi Yamamoto	11
(United Kingdom) Steve Knight	11
(Japan) Satoshi Kawabata	8
(Chinese Taipei) Chao Fong-Pang	11
(Russia) Evgeny Stalev	8
(Philippines) Francisco Bustamante	11
(Italy) Fabio Petroni	8
(Netherlands) Michael Schmidt	10
(United States) Mike Lebron	11
(Chinese Taipei) Lu Hui-Chan	4
(Japan) Akikumo Toshikawa	11
(Philippines) Efren Reyes	11
(Germany) Ralf Souquet	7

Quarter-Final (Race to 11)
(Chinese Taipei) Chang Hao-Ping	11
(Japan) Hisashi Yamamoto	6
(United Kingdom) Steve Knight	6
(Chinese Taipei) Chao Fong-Pang	11
(Philippines) Francisco Bustamante	11
(United States) Mike Lebron	3
(Japan) Akikumo Toshikawa	9
(Philippines) Efren Reyes	11

Semi-Final (Race to 11)
(Chinese Taipei) Chang Hao-Ping	11
(Chinese Taipei) Chao Fong-Pang	8
(Philippines) Francisco Bustamante	4
(Philippines) Efren Reyes	11

Final (Race to 17)
(Chinese Taipei) Chang Hao-Ping	8
(Philippines) Efren Reyes	17
