= 2010 U.S. Open 9-ball Championship =

Tournament information
- Dates: 17–23 October 2010
- Venue: Chesapeake Conference Center
- City: Chesapeake, Virginia
- Country: United States
- Organisation: World Pool-Billiard Association
- Format: Double elimination

Final
- Champion: (England) Darren Appleton
- Runner-up: (United States) Corey Deuel
- Score: 15-13

The 2010 U.S. Open 9-ball Championship is the 35th annual men's U.S. Open 9-Ball Championships. The championship was held at Chesapeake Conference Center, Chesapeake, Virginia from October 17 to 23, 2010. Finland's Mika Immonen was the defending champion. Unlike most sports tournaments, women are allowed to enter the main draw. The event was won by Darren Appleton defeating Corey Deuel 15–13 in the final.

== Rules ==
- Double elimination tournament
- Winner's break
- No soft breaks
- At the final day, winning margin should be two racks or more. If the scores are hill-hill, a player has to win two consecutive racks to win the match.

== Winners' bracket ==
=== Section 1 ===
First Round
(Finland) Mika Immonen	11
Joey Arbuckle	4
(Japan) Kenichi Uchigaki	11
Kiril Jeliazkov	0
(United States) Max Eberle	11
Jim Murnak	3
(United States) Danny Olson	11
Aymen Neyaz	2
(Puerto Rico) Mike Lebrón	0
(Indonesia) Ricky Yang	11
Craig Houghton	11
(United States) Danny Mastermaker	3
Brian Brekke	7
(United States) Adam Smith	11
James Gottier	6
Tommy Tokoph	11
Pedro Codon	4
Billy Dugan	11
(United States) Robb Saez	11
Dustin Morris	7
Larry Phlegar	4
(United States) Brent Boemmels	11
(Canada) Peter Jackson	11
Carston Due	3
(United States) Gabe Owen	11
Phil Davis	9
Bill Carenbauer	3
(United States) Chris Futrell	11
Shane Winters	11
Steve Lillis	6
Angie Hawkins	0
(United States) Brian Parks	11

Second Round
(Finland) Mika Immonen	11
(Japan) Kenichi Uchigaki	5
(United States) Max Eberle	11
(United States) Danny Olson	2
(Indonesia) Ricky Yang	11
Craig Houghton	1
(United States) Adam Smith	11
Tommy Tokoph	6
Billy Duggan	2
(United States) Robb Saez	11
(United States) Brent Boemmels	11
(Canada) Peter Jackson	8
(United States) Gabe Owen	11
(United States) Chris Futrell	4
Shane Winters	5
(United States) Brian Parks	11

Third Round
(Finland) Mika Immonen	11
(United States) Max Eberle	5
(Indonesia) Ricky Yang	11
(United States) Adam Smith	6
(United States) Robb Saez	11
(United States) Brent Boemmels	7
(United States) Gabe Owen	11
(United States) Brian Parks	8

Fourth Round
(Finland) Mika Immonen	11
(Indonesia) Ricky Yang	3
(United States) Robb Saez	8
(United States) Gabe Owen	11

Fifth Round
(Finland) Mika Immonen	11
(United States) Gabe Owen	10

=== Section 2 ===
First Round
(United States) Johnny Archer	11
E.J. Globe	5
Tracy Prescott	0
(Philippines) Dennis Orcollo	11*
Chris Szuter	11
Curtis Coleman	7
Darryl Smith	6
Cleiton Darocha	11
Stevie Moore	11
Mike Andrews	1
(Denmark) Bahram Lofty	11
Rodney McLamb	3
(United States) Jeff Crawford	11
Matt RIggs	7
Jim Lanning	6
Shane Norris	11
Lorie Jon Hasson	8
Shaun Wilkie	11
Blair Levandowski	4
(United States) B.J. Ussery	11
Michael Page	3
Jeff Abernathy	11
(England) Chris Melling	11
Sarah Rousey	2
(United States) Shane Van Boening	3
(United States) Mike Dechaine	11
(Japan) Lo Li-wen	11
Mike Badsteubner	4
David Ross	5
Jennifer Baretta	11
Frank Fennema	9
(England) Nigel Francis	11

Second Round
(United States) Johnny Archer	11
(Philippines) Dennis Orcollo	9
Chris Szuter	8
Cleiton Darocha	11
Stevie Moore	11
(Denmark) Bahram Lofty	9
(United States) Jeff Crawford	11
Shane Norris	5
Shaun Wilkie	4
(United States) B.J. Ussery	11
Jeff Abernathy	9
(England) Chris Melling	11
(United States) Mike Dechaine	5
(Japan) Lo Li-wen	11
Jennifer Barretta	4
(England) Nigel Francis	11

Third Round
(United States) Johnny Archer	11
Cleiton Darocha	2
Stevie Moore	11
(United States) Jeff Crawford	4
(United States) B.J. Ussery	2
(England) Chris Melling	11
(Japan) Lo Li-wen	11
(England) Nigel Francis	2

Fourth Round
(United States) Johnny Archer	11
Stevie Moore	6
(England) Chris Melling	10
(Japan) Lo Li-wen	11

Fifth Round
(United States) Johnny Archer	10
(Japan) Lo Li-wen	11

*Forfeit

=== Section 3 ===
First Round
(Germany) Ralf Souquet	11
Bill Bauer	0
Robert Pole	11
Badi Nazhat	10
Robert Begey	2
(United States) Brandon Shuff	11
Jackie Duggan	2
William Anderson	11
(England) Imran Majid	11
Henry Lopez	4
(England) Raj Hundal	11
Mike Harvey	3
(United States) Rob Phillips	11
Robert Ruffalo	3
Rajesh Khanna Vannala	10
(United States) Sam Monday	11
(United States) Nick Varner	11
Bill Dunsmore	5
Chad Nelson	1
(Finland) Olli Turkulainen	11
Eric Moore	11
Randy Labonte	3
Dwayne Guillory	4
(Mexico) Ernesto Dominguez	11
(United States) Rodney Morris	11
Andrew Kane	2
Borana Andoni	10
George McLanahan	11
Stephen Hickman	3
Mike Fuller	11
George Vlacich	2
Raymond Lee	11

Second Round
(Germany) Ralf Souquet	11
Robert Pole	1
(United States) Brandon Shuff	11
William Anderson	5
(England) Imran Majid	8
(England) Raj Hundal	11
(United States) Rob Phillips	8
(United States) Sam Monday	11
(United States) Nick Varner	11
(Finland) Olli Turkulainen	7
Eric Moore	9
(Mexico) Ernesto Dominguez	11
(United States) Rodney Morris	11
George McLanahan	6
Mike Fuller	11
Raymond Lee	2

Third Round
(Germany) Ralf Souquet	11
(United States) Brandon Shuff	2
(England) Raj Hundal	11
(United States) Sam Monday	8
(United States) Nick Varner	11
(Mexico) Ernesto Dominguez	10
(United States) Rodney Morris	11
Mike Fuller	3

Fourth Round
(Germany) Ralf Souquet	11
(England) Raj Hundal	9
(United States) Nick Varner	7
(United States) Rodney Morris	11

Fifth Round
(Germany) Ralf Souquet	11
(United States) Rodney Morris	6

=== Section 4 ===
First Round
(Philippines) Alex Pagulayan	11
Levi Meiller	6
(United States) Larry Kressel	11
Cary Dunn	10
Lee Scott	3
Santos Sambajon, Jr.	11
William Gallagher	2
(United States) Charlie Williams	11
Tommy Kennedy	11
Douglas Jones	2
Rob Leeper	7
Gabriel Bitanga	11
Ronnie Park	11
Pat DiBuono	4
(United States) Richard Broumpton	11
Daniel MacIntyre	4
JoAnn Mason Parker	3
Reyjon Carmona	11
Morgan Steinman	7
(United States) Mike Davis	11
(United States) Demetrius Jelatis	11
Thomas Giddens	4
John Timmermans	7
Jody McLaughlin	11
(England) Karl Boyes	11
Tim Colvin	4
Ahmed Ali	10
(Canada) Ronnie Wiseman	11
(Canada) Jason Klatt	11
Sammy Wu	7
Andrew Aupin	11
(United States) Adam Kielar	8

Second Round
(Philippines) Alex Pagulayan	8
(United States) Larry Kressel	11
Santos Sambajon, Jr.	8
(United States) Charlie Williams	11
Tommy Kennedy	11
Gabriel Bitanga	7
Ronnie Park	11
(United States) Richard Broumpton	9
Reyjon Carmona	3
(United States) Mike Davis	11
(United States) Demetrius Jelatis	11
Jody McLaughlin	5
(England) Karl Boyes	11
(Canada) Ronnie Wiseman	3
(Canada) Jason Klatt	11
Andrew Aupin	10

Third Round
(United States) Larry Kressel	5
(United States) Charlie Williams	11
Tommy Kennedy	11
Ronnie Park	8
(United States) Mike Davis	11
(United States) Demetrius Jelatis	10
(England) Karl Boyes	9
(Canada) Jason Klatt	11

Fourth Round
(United States) Charlie Williams	11
Tommy Kennedy	7
(United States) Mike Davis	6
(Canada) Jason Klatt	11

Fifth Round
(United States) Charlie Williams	10
(Canada) Jason Klatt	11

=== Section 5 ===
First Round
(Philippines) Lee Vann Corteza	11
Alexander Fitzgerald	2
Amy Chen	11
Edmundo Ambrose	6
John Mitcheltree	7
John Hernandez	11
(Germany) Thorsten Hohmann	11
(United States) Johnathan Pinegar	10
Dave Bollman	11
Chris Bruner	4
Jason Johann	4
(Philippines) Jose Parica	11
(England) Daryl Peach	11
(United States) Paul Song	6
Holden Chin	10
(Austria) Gerda Hofstätter	11
(United States) Mike Sigel	11
Walter Blacker	5
Ray Reyna	11*
Sho Tsuken	0
George SanSouci	7
(United States) Ivaylo Petrov	11
(Canada) Erik Hjorliefson	11
Dan Ruden	3
(United States) Earl Strickland	11
Mike Delaner	4
Tony Crosby	5
(Philippines) Jundel Mazon	11
(United States) Jesse Engel	11
Yomaylin Feliz	3
(Canada) John Morra	11
David Hunt	9

Second Round
(Philippines) Lee Vann Corteza	11
Amy Chen	3
John Hernandez	7
(Germany) Thorsten Hohmann	11
Dave Bollman	8
(Philippines) Jose Parica	11
(England) Daryl Peach	11
(Austria) Gerda Hofstätter	4
(United States) Mike Sigel	11
Ray Reyna	4
(United States) Ivaylo Petrov	11
(Canada) Erik Hjorliefson	6
(United States) Earl Strickland	11
(Philippines) Jundel Mazon	9
(United States) Jesse Engel	11
(Canada) John Morra	9

Third Round
(Philippines) Lee Vann Corteza	7
(Germany) Thorsten Hohmann	11
(Philippines) Jose Parica	6
(England) Daryl Peach	11
(United States) Mike Sigel	11
(United States) Ivaylo Petrov	5
(United States) Earl Strickland	10
(United States) Jesse Engel	11

Fourth Round
(Germany) Thorsten Hohmann	11
(England) Daryl Peach	8
(United States) Mike Sigel	1
(United States) Jesse Engel	11

Fifth Round
(Germany) Thorsten Hohmann	11
(United States) Jesse Engel	8

*Forfeit

=== Section 6 ===
First Round
(Spain) David Alcaide	11
Mike Champagne	4
(Philippines) Antonio Lining	9
(United States) Rory Hendrickson	11
Greg Harada	11
David Rowell	10
(United States) Beau Runningen	11
Kento Yonezu	2
(United States) Donny Mills	11
Michael Clay	8
Matt Krah	3
Delton Howard	11
Dana Michaud	3
(United States) Gary Lutman	11
Nelson Weimer	6
(Canada) Stan Tourangeau	11
Belinda Beardon-Calhoun	7
(Philippines) Ramil Gallego	11
(Germany) Ralf Eckert	11
John Alicea	8
Chad Pike	11
Bernie Kirby	3
(Peru) Manny Chau	11
Butch Croft	5
(Philippines) Francisco Bustamante	11
(United States) Shawn Putnam	9
Eddie Little	11
Michael Yednak	6
(United States) Oscar Dominguez	11
Edward Richardson	6
Mark Tafoya	11
Verjil Bedwin	9

Second Round
(Spain) David Alcaide	11
(United States) Rory Hendrickson	9
Greg Harada	1
(United States) Beau Runningen	11
(United States) Donny Mills	11
Delton Howard	2
(United States) Gary Lutman	8
(Canada) Stan Tourangeau	11
(Philippines) Ramil Gallego	11
(Germany) Ralf Eckert	3
Chad Pike	2
(Peru) Manny Chau	11
(Philippines) Francisco Bustamante	11
Eddie Little	1
(United States) Oscar Dominguez	11
Mark Tafoya	5

Third Round
(Spain) David Alcaide	11
(United States) Beau Runningen	5
(United States) Donny Mills	6
(Canada) Stan Tourangeau	11
(Philippines) Ramil Gallego	10
(Peru) Manny Chau	11
(Philippines) Francisco Bustamante	11
(United States) Oscar Dominguez	6

Fourth Round
(Spain) David Alcaide	11
(Canada) Stan Tourangeau	5
(Peru) Manny Chau	6
(Philippines) Francisco Bustamante	11

Fifth Round
(Spain) David Alcaide	11
(Philippines) Francisco Bustamante	10

=== Section 7 ===
First Round
Steve Sones	11
Michael Connor	8
(United States) Dennis Harr	11
Scott Higgens	9
Chris Pyle	4
Omar Santiago	11
(Netherlands) Huidji See	11
Dave Fernandez	6
(United States) Chris Bartram	11
Mike Stansbury	1
(Philippines) Warren Kiamco	11
Richard Burns	2
(United States) Chris Orme	11
Elias Patrikios	2
(United States) Hunter Lombardo	3
(Philippines) Roberto Gomez	11
(United States) John Schmidt	11
Gregg McAndrews	4
Neslihan Gurel	6
Daniel Heidrich	11
Michael Wong	11
Scott Frost	9
Steven Page	11
Cheryl Pritchard	4
(United States) Corey Deuel	11
Tom Czaplicki	1
(Canada) Edwin Montal	9
Keith Bennett	11
Richard Glasscock	11
David Cooper	5
Jerome Rockwell	5
(United States) Joshua Burbel	11

Second Round
Steve Sones	4
(United States) Dennis Harr	11
Omar Santiago	1
(Netherlands) Huidji See	11
(United States) Chris Bartram	7
(Philippines) Warren Kiamco	11
(United States) Chris Orme	11
(Philippines) Roberto Gomez	8
(United States) John Schmidt	2
Daniel Heidrich	11
Michael Wong	11
Steven Page	3
(United States) Corey Deuel	11
Keith Bennett	5
Richard Glasscock	1
(United States) Joshua Burbel	11

Third Round
(United States) Dennis Harr	8
(Netherlands) Huidji See	11
(Philippines) Warren Kiamco	11
(United States) Chris Orme	7
Daniel Heidrich	9
Michael Wong	11
(United States) Corey Deuel	11
(United States) Joshua Burbel	8

Fourth Round
(Netherlands) Huidji See	6
(Philippines) Warren Kiamco	11
Michael Wong	3
(United States) Corey Deuel	11

Fifth Round
(Philippines) Warren Kiamco	10
(United States) Corey Deuel	11

=== Section 8 ===
First Round
(Philippines) Efren Reyes	11
Nick Tafoya	3
Joshua Newman	9
(Australia) Ben Judge	11
(Czech Republic) Roman Hybler	11
Joe Pierce	5
Tomu Takano	11
Craig McPartlin	4
So Shaw	10
Carlos Carter	11
Gregory Diehl	0
(United States) Jeremy Sossei	11*
Ben Barber	11
Bruce Nagle	6
Marc Vidal	11
Jo Ka Nim	5
Ewa Laurance	11
Bill Mason	6
Brent Hensley	5
(United States) Chip Klein	11
Frankie Hernandez	11
Kaloyan Rusanov	4
(Scotland) Jayson Shaw	11
Kento Lacy	0
(England) Darren Appleton	11
Ronald Tutien	5
Don Steele	3
(Israel) Zion Zvi	11
Peter Benoit	0
Jason Richko	11
(Philippines) Ronato Alcano	11
Justin Hall	6

Second Round
(Philippines) Efren Reyes	11
(Australia) Ben Judge	7
(Czech Republic) Roman Hybler	8
Tomu Takano	11
Carlos Carter	3
(United States) Jeremy Sossei	11
Ben Barber	8
Marc Vidal	11
Ewa Laurance	6
(United States) Chip Klein	11
Frankie Hernandez	9
(Scotland) Jayson Shaw	11
(England) Darren Appleton	11
(Israel) Zion Zvi	8
Jason Richko	7
(Philippines) Ronato Alcano	11

Third Round
(Philippines) Efren Reyes	11
Tomu Takano	2
(United States) Jeremy Sossei	10
Marc Vidal	11
(United States) Chip Klein	6
(Scotland) Jayson Shaw	11
(England) Darren Appleton	11
(Philippines) Ronato Alcano	7

Fourth Round
(Philippines) Efren Reyes	11
Marc Vidal	7
Jayson Shaw	6
(England) Darren Appleton	11

Fifth Round
(Philippines) Efren Reyes	5
(England) Darren Appleton	11

*Forfeit

== Losers' bracket from second to fifth rounds ==
=== Section 1 ===
Second round
Joey Arbuckle	11
Kiril Jeliazkov	3
Jim Murnak	11
Aymen Neyaz	10
(Puerto Rico) Mike Lebrón	2
(United States) Danny Mastermaker	11
Brian Brekke	11
James Gottier	7

Third round
Joey Arbuckle	11
Jason Richko	10
Jim Murnak	6
(Israel) Zion Zvi	11
(United States) Danny Mastermaker	11
Frankie Hernandez	5
Brian Brekke	11
Ewa Laurance	3

Fourth round
Joey Arbuckle	3
(Israel) Zion Zvi	11
(United States) Danny Mastermaker	11
Brian Brekke	9

Fifth round
(Israel) Zion Zvi	9
(England) Karl Boyes	11
(United States) Danny Mastermaker	5
(United States) Demetrius Jelatis	11

Second round
Pedro Codon	4
Dustin Morris	11
Larry Phlegar	8
Carston Due	11
Phil Davis	11
Bill Carenbauer	4
Steve Lillis	11*
Angie Hawkins	0

Third round
Dustin Morris	11
Ben Barber	2
Carston Due	3
Carlos Carter	11
Phil Davis	0
(Czech Republic) Roman Hybler	11
Steve Lillis	1
(Australia) Ben Judge	11

Fourth round
Dustin Morris	6
Carlos Carter	11
(Czech Republic) Roman Hybler	11
(Australia) Ben Judge	7

Fifth round
Carlos Carter	6
Ronnie Park	11
(Czech Republic) Roman Hybler	11
(United States) Larry Kressel	7

*Forfeit

=== Section 2 ===
Second round
E.J. Glode	11*
Tracy Prescott	0
Curtis Coleman	9
Darryl Smith	11
Mike Andrews	0
Rodney McLamb	11
Matt Riggs	11
Jim Lanning	10

Third round
E.J. Glode	5
Richard Glasscock	11
Darryl Smith	6
Keith Bennett	11
Rodney McLamb	11
Steven Page	0
Matt Riggs	10
(United States) John Schmidt	11

Fourth round
Richard Glasscock	1
Keith Bennett	11
Rodney McLamb	6
(United States) John Schmidt	11

Fifth round
Keith Bennett	11
Mike Fuller	3
(United States) John Schmidt	10
(Mexico) Ernesto Dominguez	11

Second round
Loree Jon Hasson	9
Blair Levandowski	11
Michael Page	0
Sarah Rousey	11*
(United States) Shane Van Boening	11
Mike Badsteubner	2
David Ross	11
Frank Fennema	4

Third round
Blair Levandowski	6
(Philippines) Roberto Gomez	11
Sarah Rousey	5
(United States) Chris Bartram	11
(United States) Shane Van Boening	11
Omar Santiago	6
David Ross	5
Steve Sones	11

Fourth round
(Philippines) Roberto Gomez	9
(United States) Chris Bartram	11
(United States) Shane Van Boening	11
Steve Sones	3

Fifth round
(United States) Chris Bartram	11
(United States) Sam Monday	8
(United States) Shane Van Boening	11
(United States) Brandon Shuff	4

*Forfeit

=== Section 3 ===
Second round
Bill Bauer	8
Badi Nazhat	11
Robert Begey	11
Jackie Duggan	1
Henry Lopez	11
Mike Harvey	5
Robert Ruffalo	3
Rajesh Khanna Vannala	11

Third round
Badi Nazhat	5
Mark Tafoya	11
Robert Begey	4
Eddie Little	11
Henry Lopez	4
Chad Pike	11
Rajesh Khanna Vannala	2
(Germany) Ralf Eckert	11

Fourth round
Mark Tafoya	7
Eddie Little	11
Chad Pike	5
(Germany) Ralf Eckert	11

Fifth round
Eddie Little	11
(England) Nigel Francis	6
(Germany) Ralf Eckert	8
(United States) B.J. Ussery	11

Second round
Bill Dunsmore	11
Chad Nelson	8
Randy Labonte	11
Dwayne Guillory	8
Andrew Kane	11
Borana Andoni	6
Stephen Hickman	11
George Vlacich	8

Third round
Bill Dunsmore	1
(United States) Gary Lutman	11
Randy Labonte	9
Delton Howard	11
Andrew Kane	3
Greg Harada	11
Stephen Hickman	5
(United States) Rory Hendrickson	11

Fourth round
(United States) Gary Lutman	11
Delton Howard	7
Greg Harada	4
(United States) Rory Hendrickson	11

Fifth round
(United States) Gary Lutman	7
(United States) Jeff Crawford	11
(United States) Rory Hendrickson	11
Cleiton Darocha	6

=== Section 4 ===
Second round
Levi Meiller	11
Cary Dunn	8
Lee Scott	10
William Gallagher	11
Douglas Jones	11
Rob Leeper	2
Pat DiBuono	8
Daniel MacIntyre	11

Third round
Levi Meiller	11
(Canada) John Morra	10
William Gallagher	1
(Philippines) Jundel Mazon	11
Douglas Jones	4
(Canada) Erik Hjorliefson	11
Daniel MacIntyre	11
Ray Reyna	7

Fourth round
Levi Meiller	2
(Philippines) Jundel Mazon	11
(Canada) Erik Hjorliefson	11
Daniel MacIntyre	8

Fifth round
(Philippines) Jundel Mazon	11
(United States) Brian Parks	5
(Canada) Erik Hjorliefson	11
(United States) Brent Boemmels	4

Second round
JoAnn Mason Parker	11
Morgan Steinman	6
Thomas Giddens	8
John Timmermans	11
Tim Colvin	11
Ahmed Ali	4
Sammy Wu	4
(United States) Adam Kielar	11

Third round
JoAnn Mason Parker	4
(Austria) Gerda Hofstätter	11
John Timmermans	11
Dave Bollman	5
Tim Colvin	9
John Hernandez	11
(United States) Adam Kielar	11
Amy Chen	0

Fourth round
(Austria) Gerda Hofstätter	11
John Timmermans	10
John Hernandez	0
(United States) Adam Kielar	11*

Fifth round
(Austria) Gerda Hofstätter	9
(United States) Adam Smith	11
(United States) Adam Kielar	11
(United States) Max Eberle	3

*Forfeit

=== Section 5 ===
Second round
Alexander Fitzgerald	11
Edmundo Ambrose	8
John Mitcheltree	1
(United States) Johnathan Pinegar	11
Chris Bruner	11
Jason Johann	4
(United States) Paul Song	11
Holden Chin	4

Third round
Alexander Fitzgerald	4
Andrew Aupin	11
(United States) Johnathan Pinegar	11
(Canada) Ronnie Wiseman	4
Chris Bruner	1
Jody McLaughlin	11
(United States) Paul Song	11
Reyjon Carmona	2

Fourth round
Andrew Aupin	10
(United States) Johnathan Pinegar	11
Jody McLaughlin	6
(United States) Paul Song	11

Fifth round
(United States) Johnathan Pinegar	4
(Philippines) Ronato Alcano	11
(United States) Paul Song	11
(United States) Chip Klein	5

Second round
Walter Blacker	11*
Sho Tsuken	0
George SanSouci	11
Dan Ruden	1
Mike Delaner	5
Tony Crosby	11
Yomaylin Feliz	5
David Hunt	11

Third round
Walter Blacker	2
(United States) Richard Broumpton	11
George SanSouci	11
Gabriel Bitanga	4
Tony Crosby	11
Santos Sambajon Jr.	8
David Hunt	2
(Philippines) Alex Pagulayan	11

Fourth round
(United States) Richard Broumpton	11
George SanSouci	5
Tony Crosby	3
(Philippines) Alex Pagulayan	11*

Fifth round
(United States) Richard Broumpton	8
(United States) Jeremy Sossei	11
(Philippines) Alex Pagulayan	11
Tomu Takano	7

*Forfeit

=== Section 6 ===
Second round
Mike Champagne	2
(Philippines) Antonio Lining	11
David Rowell	7
Kento Yonezu	11
Michael Clay	1
Matt Krah	11
Dana Michaud	10
Nelson Weimer	11

Third round
(Philippines) Antonio Lining	11
Raymond Lee	2
Kento Yonezu	11
George McLanahan	4
Matt Krah	11
Eric Moore	9
Nelson Weimer	9
(Finland) Olli Turkulainen	11

Fourth round
(Philippines) Antonio Lining	11
Kento Yonezu	6
Matt Krah	9
(Finland) Olli Turkulainen	11

Fifth round
(Philippines) Antonio Lining	11
(United States) Joshua Burbel	1
(Finland) Olli Turkulainen	8
Daniel Heidrich	11

Second round
Belinda Beardon-Calhoun	7
John Alicea	11
Bernie Kirby	5
Butch Croft	11
(United States) Shawn Putnam	11
Michael Yednak	7
Edward Richardson	11
Verjil Bedwin	5

Third round
John Alicea	3
(United States) Rob Phillips	11
Butch Croft	5
(England) Imran Majid	11
(United States) Shawn Putnam	11
William Anderson	7
Edward Richardson	11
Robert Pole	8

Fourth round
(United States) Rob Phillips	11
(England) Imran Majid	5
(United States) Shawn Putnam	11
Edward Richardson	4

Fifth round
(United States) Rob Phillips	5
(United States) Chris Orme	11
(United States) Shawn Putnam	7
(United States) Dennis Harr	11

=== Section 7 ===
Second round
Michael Connor	0
Scott Higgens	11
Chris Pyle	2
Dave Fernandez	11
Mike Stansbury	9
Richard Burns	11
Elias Patrikios	5
(United States) Hunter Lombardo	11

Third round
Scott Higgens	11
Jennifer Barretta	5
Dave Fernandez	7
(United States) Mike Dechaine	11
Richard Burns	10
Jeff Abernathy	11
(United States) Hunter Lombardo	11
Shaun Wilkie	6

Fourth round
Scott Higgens	8
(United States) Mike Dechaine	11
Jeff Abernathy	10
(United States) Hunter Lombardo	11

Fifth round
(United States) Mike Dechaine	11
(United States) Oscar Dominguez	1
(United States) Hunter Lombardo	3
(Philippines) Ramil Gallego	11

Second round
Gregg McAndrews	11
Neslihan Gurel	4
Scott Frost	11
Cheryl Pritchard	1
Tom Czaplicki	2
(Canada) Edwin Montal	11
David Cooper	10
Jerome Rockwell	11

Third round
Gregg McAndrews	11
Shane Norris	4
Scott Frost	10
(Denmark) Bahram Lofty	11
(Canada) Edwin Montal	5
Chris Szuter	11
Jerome Rockwell	4
(Philippines) Dennis Orcollo	11

Fourth round
Gregg McAndrews	4
(Denmark) Bahram Lofty	11
Chris Szuter	6
(Philippines) Dennis Orcollo	11

Fifth round
(Denmark) Bahram Lofty	6
(United States) Donny Mills	11
(Philippines) Dennis Orcollo	10
(United States) Beau Runningen	11

=== Section 8 ===
Second round
Nick Tafoya	6
Joshua Newman	11
Joe Pierce	3
Craig McPartlin	11
So Shaw	11
Gregory Diehl	0
Bruce Nagle	11
Jo Ka Nim	4

Third round
Joshua Newman	6
Shane Winters	11
Craig McPartlin	10
(United States) Chris Futrell	11
So Shaw	11
(Canada) Peter Jackson	10
Bruce Nagle	11
Billy Duggan	9

Fourth round
Shane Winters	9
(United States) Chris Futrell	11
So Shaw	11
Bruce Nagle	4

Fifth round
(United States) Chris Futrell	9
(United States) Earl Strickland	11
So Shaw	11
(United States) Ivaylo Petrov	3

Second round
Bill Mason	3
Brent Hensley	11
Kaloyan Rusanov	11
Kento Lacy	9
Ronald Tutien	4
Don Steele	11
Peter Benoit	5
Justin Hall	11

Third round
Brent Hensley	7
Tommy Tokoph	11
Kaloyan Rusanov	11
Craig Houghton	0
Don Steele	6
(United States) Danny Olson	11
Justin Hall	8
(Japan) Kenichi Uchigaki	11

Fourth round
Tommy Tokoph	11
Kaloyan Rusanov	8
(United States) Danny Olson	7
(Japan) Kenichi Uchigaki	11

Fifth round
Tommy Tokoph	11
(Philippines) Jose Parica	9
(Japan) Kenichi Uchigaki	3
(Philippines) Lee Vann Corteza	11

== Losers' bracket from sixth to eighth round ==
=== Sections 1 and 2 ===
Sixth round
(Israel) Zion Zvi	9
(England) Karl Boyes	11
(United States) Danny Mastermaker	5
(United States) Demetrius Jelatis	11
Carlos Carter	6
Ronnie Park	11
(Czech Republic) Roman Hybler	11
(United States) Larry Kressel	7

Seventh round
(England) Karl Boyes	8
(United States) Demetrius Jelatis	11
Ronnie Park	4
(Czech Republic) Roman Hybler	11

Eighth round
(United States) Demetrius Jelatis	11
(England) Daryl Peach	6
(Czech Republic) Roman Hybler	11
(United States) Mike Sigel	10

Sixth round
Keith Bennett	11
Mike Fuller	3
(United States) John Schmidt	10
(Mexico) Ernesto Dominguez	11
(United States) Chris Bartram	11
(United States) Sam Monday	8
(United States) Shane Van Boening	11
(United States) Brandon Shuff	4

Seventh round
Keith Bennett	11
(Mexico) Ernesto Dominguez	8
(United States) Chris Bartram	0
(United States) Shane Van Boening	11

Eighth round
Keith Bennett	11
(Canada) Stan Tourangeau	5
(United States) Shane Van Boening	11
(Peru) Manny Chau	1

=== Sections 3 and 4 ===
Sixth round
Eddie Little	11
(England) Nigel Francis	6
(Germany) Ralf Eckert	8
(United States) B.J. Ussery	11
(United States) Gary Lutman	7
(United States) Jeff Crawford	11
(United States) Rory Hendrickson	11
Cleiton Darocha	6

Seventh round
Eddie Little	11
(United States) B.J. Ussery	10
(United States) Jeff Crawford	9
(United States) Rory Hendrickson	11

Eighth round
Eddie Little	6
(Netherlands) Huidji See	11
(United States) Rory Hendrickson	11
Michael Wong	4

Sixth round
(Philippines) Jundel Mazon	11
(United States) Brian Parks	5
(Canada) Erik Hjorliefson	11
(United States) Brent Boemmels	4
(Austria) Gerda Hofstätter	9
(United States) Adam Smith	11
(United States) Adam Kielar	11
(United States) Max Eberle	3

Seventh round
(Philippines) Jundel Mazon	6
(Canada) Erik Hjorliefson	11
(United States) Adam Smith	10
(United States) Adam Kielar	11

Eighth round
(Canada) Erik Hjorliefson	11
Marc Vidal	6
(United States) Adam Smith	8
Jayson Shaw	11

=== Sections 5 and 6 ===
Sixth round
(United States) Johnathan Pinegar	4
(Philippines) Ronato Alcano	11
(United States) Paul Song	11
(United States) Chip Klein	5
(United States) Richard Broumpton	8
(United States) Jeremy Sossei	11
(Philippines) Alex Pagulayan	11
Tomu Takano	7

Seventh round
(Philippines) Ronato Alcano	11
(United States) Paul Song	5
(United States) Jeremy Sossei	11
(Philippines) Alex Pagulayan	5

Eighth round
(Philippines) Ronato Alcano	11
(Indonesia) Ricky Yang	10
(United States) Jeremy Sossei	10
(United States) Robb Saez	11

Sixth round
(Philippines) Antonio Lining	11
(United States) Joshua Burbel	1
(Finland) Olli Turkulainen	8
Daniel Heidrich	11
(United States) Rob Phillips	5
(United States) Chris Orme	11
(United States) Shawn Putnam	7
(United States) Dennis Harr	11

Seventh round
(Philippines) Antonio Lining	7
Daniel Heidrich	11
(United States) Chris Orme	11
(United States) Dennis Harr	5

Eighth round
Daniel Heidrich	11
Stevie Moore	7
(United States) Chris Orme	7
(England) Chris Melling	11

=== Sections 7 and 8 ===
Sixth round
(United States) Mike Dechaine	11
(United States) Oscar Dominguez	9
(United States) Hunter Lombardo	3
(Philippines) Ramil Gallego	11
(Denmark) Bahram Lofty	6
(United States) Donny Mills	11
(Philippines) Dennis Orcollo	10
(United States) Beau Runningen	11

Seventh round
(United States) Mike Dechaine	6
(Philippines) Ramil Gallego	11
(United States) Donny Mills	9
(United States) Beau Runningen	11

Eighth round
(Philippines) Ramil Gallego	11
(England) Raj Hundal	9
(United States) Beau Runningen	5
(United States) Nick Varner	11

Sixth round
(United States) Chris Futrell	9
(United States) Earl Strickland	11
So Shaw	11
(United States) Ivaylo Petrov	3
Tommy Tokoph	11
(Philippines) Jose Parica	9
(Japan) Kenichi Uchigaki	3
(Philippines) Lee Vann Corteza	11

Seventh round
(United States) Earl Strickland
So Shaw
Tommy Tokoph
(Philippines) Lee Vann Corteza

Eighth round
Tommy Kennedy
Mike Davis

== Losers' bracket from ninth to twelfth rounds ==
=== Top half ===
Ninth round
(United States) Demetrius Jelatis	5
(Czech Republic) Roman Hybler	11
Keith Bennett	5
(United States) Shane Van Boening	11
(Netherlands) Huidji See	11
(United States) Rory Hendrickson	8
(Canada) Erik Hjorliefson	5
(Scotland) Jayson Shaw	11

Tenth round
(Czech Republic) Roman Hybler	5
(United States) Johnny Archer	11
(United States) Shane Van Boening	11
(United States) Gabe Owen	5
(Netherlands) Huidji See	7
(United States) Charlie Williams	11
(Scotland) Jayson Shaw	8
(United States) Rodney Morris	11

Eleventh round
(United States) Johnny Archer	7
(United States) Shane Van Boening	11
(United States) Charlie Williams	8
(United States) Rodney Morris	11

Twelfth round
(United States) Shane Van Boening	8
(United States) Corey Deuel	11
(United States) Rodney Morris	11
(Germany) Thorsten Hohmann	2

=== Bottom half ===
Ninth round
(Philippines) Ronato Alcano	10
(United States) Robb Saez	11
Daniel Heidrich	3
(England) Chris Melling	11
(Philippines) Ramil Gallego	8
(United States) Nick Varner	11
Tommy Kennedy	11
Mike Davis	7

Tenth round
(United States) Robb Saez	10
(Philippines) Francisco Bustamante	11
(England) Chris Melling	11
(United States) Jesse Engel	10
(United States) Nick Varner	8
(Philippines) Efren Reyes	11
Tommy Kennedy	8
(Philippines) Warren Kiamco	11

Eleventh round
(Philippines) Francisco Bustamante	11
(England) Chris Melling	3
(Philippines) Efren Reyes	4
(Philippines) Warren Kiamco	11

Twelfth round
(Philippines) Francisco Bustamante	5
(Germany) Ralf Souquet	11
(Philippines) Warren Kiamco	11
(Chinese Taipei) Lo-Li-wen	7

== Final 12 players ==
Upper round 1	Upper round 2	Upper final	Final
(Finland)	Mika Immonen	11
(Japan)	Lo Li-wen	8
(Finland)	Mika Immonen	11
(Canada)	Jason Klatt	4
(Germany)	Ralf Souquet	10
(Canada)	Jason Klatt	11
(Finland)	Mika Immonen	9
(England)	Darren Appleton	11
(Germany)	Thorsten Hohmann	5
(Spain)	David Alcaide	11
(Spain)	David Alcaide	8
(England)	Darren Appleton	11
(United States)	Corey Deuel	8
(England)	Darren Appleton	11	(England)	Darren Appleton	15
(United States)	Corey Deuel	13
Lower round 1	Lower round 2	Lower round 3	Lower final
(United States)	Corey Deuel	11
(United States)	Corey Deuel	11	(Canada)	Jason Klatt	1	(United States)	Corey Deuel	11
(United States)	Rodney Morris	9	(United States)	Corey Deuel	14	(Finland)	Mika Immonen	3
(Philippines)	Warren Kiamco	12
(Philippines)	Warren Kiamco	11
(Germany)	Ralf Souquet	8	(Spain)	David Alcaide	5
(Philippines)	Warren Kiamco	11
