= Nine-ball at the 2001 World Games – men's singles =

Nine-ball men's singles at the 2001 World Games
- Venue: Selion Plaza, Akita, Japan
- Dates: 22–26 August 2001
- Competitors: 16 from 13 nations

Medalists
gold medal	(Chinese Taipei) Yang Ching-shun
silver medal	(Germany) Ralf Souquet
bronze medal	(Germany) Thomas Engert

The men's singles nine-ball competition at the 2001 World Games took place from 22 to 26 August 2001 at the Selion Plaza in Akita, Japan.

== Last 16 ==
Chao Fong-pang (Chinese Taipei)	9–11	(Canada) Paul Potier
Younghwa Jeong (South Korea)	8–11	(Germany) Thomas Engert
Buddy Hall (United States)	11–2	(South Africa) Rajandran Nair
Niels Feijen (Netherlands)	8–11	(Chinese Taipei) Yang Ching-shun
Marcus Chamat (Sweden)	6–11	(Japan) Satoshi Kawabata
Neil Patterson (New Zealand)	2–11	(Germany) Ralf Souquet
Akikumo Toshikawa (Japan)	w/o–w/d	(Mexico) Ismael Paez
Alex Lely (Netherlands)	8–11	(United States) Jon Kucharo

== Last 8 ==
Quarter-finals
(Canada) Paul Potier	9
(Germany) Thomas Engert	11
(United States) Buddy Hall	7
(Chinese Taipei) Yang Ching-shun	11
(Japan) Satoshi Kawabata	9
(Germany) Ralf Souquet	11
(Japan) Akikumo Toshikawa	6
(United States) Jon Kucharo	11

Semi-finals
(Germany) Thomas Engert	9
(Chinese Taipei) Yang Ching-shun	11
(Germany) Ralf Souquet	11
(United States) Jon Kucharo	9

Gold medal match
(Chinese Taipei) Yang Ching-shun	11
(Germany) Ralf Souquet	8
Bronze medal match
(Germany) Thomas Engert	11
(United States) Jon Kucharo	4
