= Nine-ball at the 2005 World Games – men's singles =

Nine-ball men's singles at the 2005 World Games
- Venue: Saalbau Bottrop, Duisburg, Germany
- Dates: 20–24 July 2005
- Competitors: 16 from 12 nations

Medalists
gold medal	(Chinese Taipei) Chang Pei-weo
silver medal	(Germany) Thorsten Hohmann
bronze medal	(United States) Rodney Morris

The men's singles nine-ball competition at the 2005 World Games took place from 20 to 24 July 2005 at the Saalbau Bottrop in Duisburg, Germany.

== Last 16 ==
Thorsten Hohmann (Germany)	11–8	(South Korea) Park Shin-Yong
Tom Storm (Sweden)	11–10	(Australia) Philip Reilly
Rodney Morris (United States)	11–4	(Aruba) Rolland Acosta
Thomas Engert (Germany)	11–9	(Chinese Taipei) Fu Che-Wei
Ralf Souquet (Germany)	10–11	(Greece) Vangelis Vettas
Charles Williams (United States)	11–7	(Japan) Massashi Hoshi
Chang Pei-weo (Chinese Taipei)	11–8	(South Africa) Rajenderen Govender
Niels Feijen (Netherlands)	11–10	(Canada) Paul Potier

== Last 8 ==
Quarter-finals
(Germany) Thorsten Hohmann	11
(Sweden) Tom Storm	10
(United States) Rodney Morris	11
(Germany) Thomas Engert	8
(Greece) Vangelis Vettas	11
(United States) Charles Williams	7
(Chinese Taipei) Chang Pei-weo	11
(Netherlands) Niels Feijen	7

Semi-finals
(Germany) Thorsten Hohmann	11
(United States) Rodney Morris	10
(Greece) Vangelis Vettas	7
(Chinese Taipei) Chang Pei-weo	11

Gold medal match
(Germany) Thorsten Hohmann	10
(Chinese Taipei) Chang Pei-weo	11
Bronze medal match
(United States) Rodney Morris	11
(Greece) Vangelis Vettas	2
