= U.S. Open Pool Championship =

Annual nine-ball pool tournament

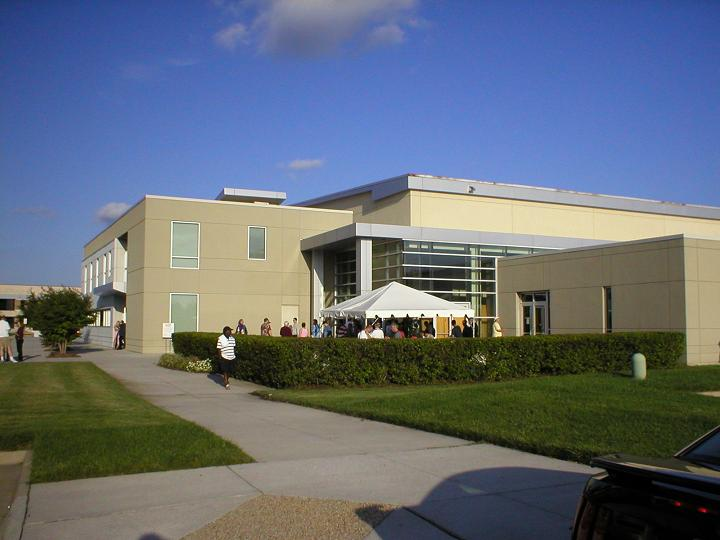
Chesapeake Conference Center, site of the U.S. Open 9-Ball Championship from 1997 to 2011

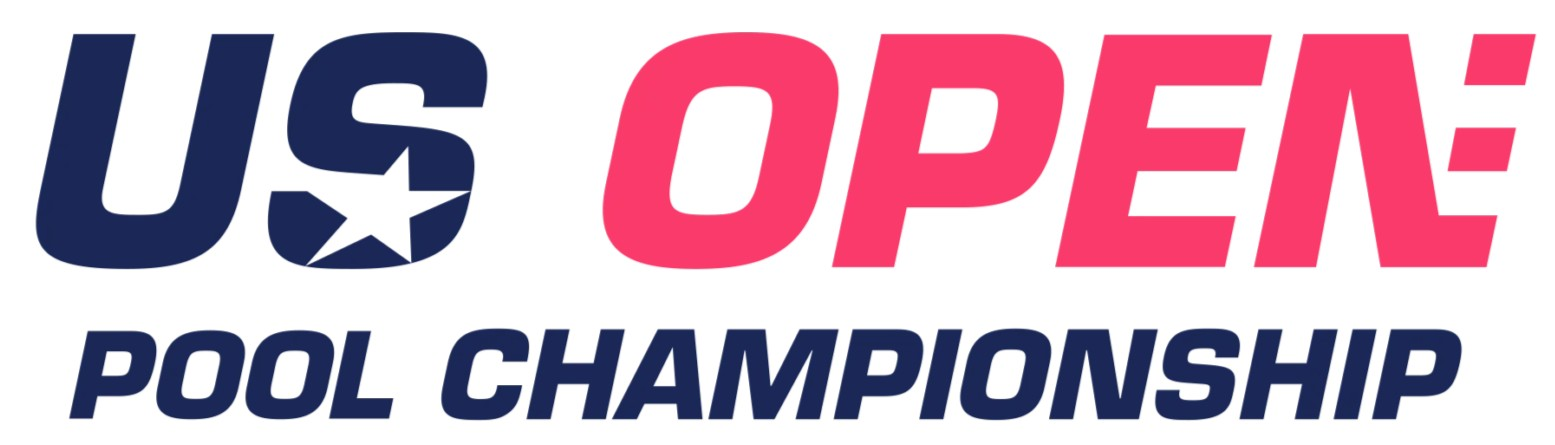
US Open Pool Championship Logo

The U.S. Open Pool Championship, formerly the U.S. Open Nine-ball Championship, is an annual professional men's nine-ball pool tournament that began in its current form in 1976. The U.S. Open is one of the most sought-after titles in nine-ball and in pool generally. Traditionally, winners of the U.S. Open are given a green blazer and are awarded free entry fees to all future U.S. Open tournaments.

== History ==
In its first official edition in 1976, the U.S. Open was contested by just 16 players. Over the years, the number of participants steadily increased, reaching its current level of 256 players.

The tournament is open to both men and women, including wheelchair users, making it a true "open" tournament. The only requirement to play in the event is the payment of the entry fee. The total purse for the tournament is $300,000, where the winner is awarded $50,000. There is also a separate Women's U.S. Open, sanctioned by the Women's Professional Billiard Association (WPBA).

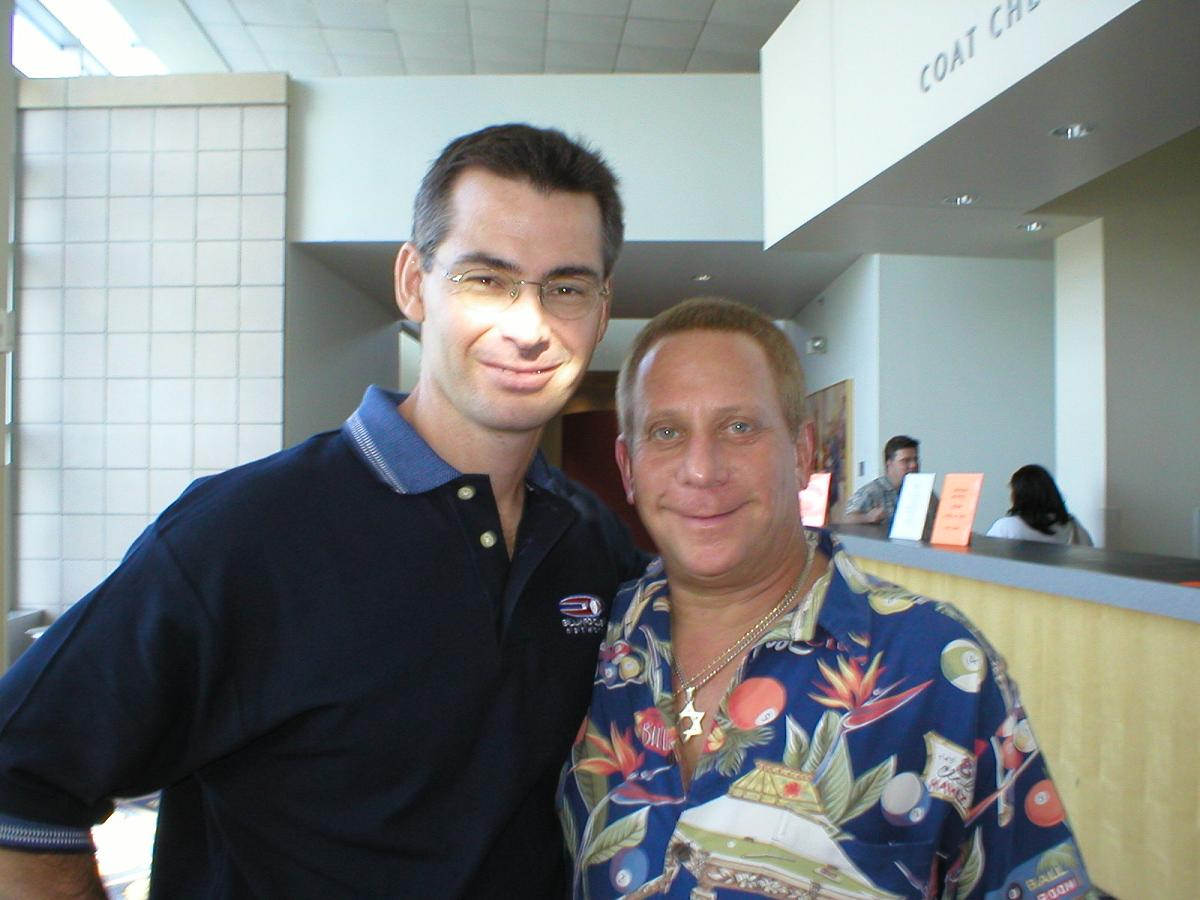
Original U.S. Open promoter Barry Behrman (right) with Rob Sykora of Billiard Club Network (left) at the 2004 event.

The tournament's original venue was Q-Master Billiards pool hall, in Norfolk, Virginia, which hosted the event, other than one year, from 1976 until 1988. From 1997 to 2011, the U.S. Open Men's Division was held at the Chesapeake Conference Center in Chesapeake, Virginia. Q-Masters is still involved in the tournament.

Original promoter Barry Behrman died on April 23, 2016. His children, Brady Behrman and Shannon Behrman Paschall, took over operating the tournament until 2018, when it was sold to Matchroom Pool.

== Format ==
The tournament format is essentially double-elimination (a player is out of the tournament after losing two matches) until two players remain. Most professional pool "double-elimination" events, however, are not true double-elimination formats, where the player who reaches the finals from the loser's side has to defeat the winner's side player twice for the title.

As of 2019, the tournament reverts to single-elimination from the last 16 onwards. At the U.S. Open, matches are played in races to 11, with the winner breaking. However, the final match, as is customary with most professional nine-ball tournaments today, is one extended race. At the U.S. Open, the extended race in the finals is 13 racks.

== Winners ==
Year	Winner	Runner-up	Final score	Venue	Winner's Prize	Total Prize
1976	(United States) Mike Sigel	(United States) Pete Margo	11–1	Q-Master Billiards, Norfolk, VA	$3,100	$8,975
1978	(United States) Allen Hopkins	(United States) Steve Mizerak	15–11	Q-Master Billiards, Norfolk, VA	$5,000	$14,500
1979	(United States) Louie Roberts	(United States) David Howard	15–11	Q-Master Billiards, Norfolk, VA	$3,000	$8,000
1979	(United States) Steve Mizerak	(United States) Jim Rempe	11–10	Q-Master Billiards, Norfolk, VA	$3,600	$8,500
1980	(United States) Mike Sigel (2)	(United States) Ray Martin	11–7	Q-Master Billiards, Norfolk, VA	$3,600	$8,500
1981	(United States) Allen Hopkins (2)	(United States) Mike Sigel	11–7	Q-Master Billiards, Norfolk, VA	$4,000	$10,000
1982	(United States) David Howard	(United States) Mike Zuglan	10–4	Q-Master Billiards, Norfolk, VA	$4,000	$10,000
1983	(United States) Mike Sigel (3)	(United States) David Howard	11–10	Q-Master Billiards, Norfolk, VA	$5,000	$13,750
1984	(United States) Earl Strickland	(United States) Mike Sigel	11–10	Lake Wright Hotel, Norfolk, VA	$10,000	$25,900
1985	(United States) Jimmy Reid	(Puerto Rico) Mike Lebrón	11–5	Q-Master Billiards, Norfolk, VA	$7,800	$23,000
1986	(United States) David Howard (2)	(United States) Allen Hopkins	11–9	Q-Master Billiards, Norfolk, VA	$7,000	$22,200
1987	(United States) Earl Strickland (2)	(United States) Jim Rempe	11–7	Q-Master Billiards, Norfolk, VA	$7,000	$24,000
1988	(Puerto Rico) Mike Lebrón	(United States) Nick Varner	11–6	Q-Master Billiards, Norfolk, VA	$8,000	$30,000
1989	(United States) Nick Varner	(United States) Kim Davenport	13–6	Lake Wright Hotel, Norfolk, VA	$10,000	$35,000
1990	(United States) Nick Varner (2)	(United States) Johnny Archer	11–10	Lake Wright Hotel, Norfolk, VA	$10,000	$41,000
1991	(United States) Buddy Hall	(United States) Dennis Hatch	9–8	Holiday Inn, Chesapeake, VA	$15,000	$65,000
1992	(United States) Tommy Kennedy	(United States) Johnny Archer	9–1	Holiday Inn, Chesapeake, VA	$15,000	$61,600
1993	(United States) Earl Strickland (3)	(United States) Tony Ellin	11–8	Holiday Inn, Chesapeake, VA	$15,000	$58,400
1994	(Philippines) Efren Reyes	(United States) Nick Varner	9–6	Holiday Inn, Chesapeake, VA	$15,000	$53,200
1995	(United States) Reed Pierce	(Philippines) Efren Reyes	11–6	Holiday Inn, Chesapeake, VA	$20,000	$77,800
1996	(United States) Rodney Morris	(Philippines) Efren Reyes	11–6	Virginia Beach Convention Center, VA	$25,000	$116,250
1997	(United States) Earl Strickland (4)	(Philippines) Efren Reyes	11–3	Chesapeake Conference Center, VA	$25,000	$124,500
1998	(United States) Buddy Hall (2)	(United States) Tang Hoa	11–5	Chesapeake Conference Center, VA	$25,000	$105,500
1999	(United States) Johnny Archer	(United States) Jeremy Jones	11–7	Chesapeake Conference Center, VA	$30,000	$131,600
2000	(United States) Earl Strickland (5)	(Japan) Takeshi Okumura	11–5	Chesapeake Conference Center, VA	$50,000	$211,000
2001	(United States) Corey Deuel	(Finland) Mika Immonen	11–0	Chesapeake Conference Center, VA	$30,000	$148,200
2002	(Germany) Ralf Souquet	(Canada) Alex Pagulayan	13–11	Chesapeake Conference Center, VA	$30,000	$150,000
2003	(United States) Jeremy Jones	(Philippines) Jose Parica	11–4	Chesapeake Conference Center, VA	$30,000	$125,000
2004	(United States) Gabe Owen	(Germany) Thorsten Hohmann	11–3	Chesapeake Conference Center, VA	$30,000	$145,000
2005	(Canada) Alex Pagulayan	(Philippines) Jose Parica	11–6	Chesapeake Conference Center, VA	$40,000	$200,000
2006	(United States) John Schmidt	(Philippines) Rodolfo Luat	11–6	Chesapeake Conference Center, VA	$40,000	$159,000
2007	(United States) Shane Van Boening	(Philippines) Ronato Alcano	13–10	Chesapeake Conference Center, VA	$50,000	$182,000
2008	(Finland) Mika Immonen	(Philippines) Ronato Alcano	13–7	Chesapeake Conference Center, VA	$40,000	$212,000
2009	(Finland) Mika Immonen (2)	(Germany) Ralf Souquet	13–10	Chesapeake Conference Center, VA	$40,000	$200,000
2010	(England) Darren Appleton	(United States) Corey Deuel	15–13	Chesapeake Conference Center, VA	$40,000	$180,000
2011	(England) Darren Appleton (2)	(United States) Shawn Putnam	13–6	Chesapeake Conference Center, VA	$30,000	$175,100
2012	(United States) Shane Van Boening (2)	(Philippines) Dennis Orcollo	13–7	Holiday Inn, Virginia Beach, VA	$25,000	$170,000
2013	(United States) Shane Van Boening (3)	(Philippines) Lee Vann Corteza	13–10	Marriott Chesapeake, Norfolk, VA	$30,000	$135,000
2014	(United States) Shane Van Boening (4)	(Philippines) Dennis Orcollo	13–10	Marriott Chesapeake, Norfolk, VA	$30,000	$165,000
2015	(Chinese Taipei) Kevin Cheng	(England) Karl Boyes	13–6	Sheraton Norfolk Waterside Hotel, Norfolk, VA	$40,000	$192,000
2016	(United States) Shane Van Boening (5)	(Chinese Taipei) Chang Jung-lin	13–9	Sheraton Norfolk Waterside Hotel, Norfolk, VA	$50,000	$200,000
2017	(Scotland) Jayson Shaw	(Albania) Eklent Kaçi	13–4	Sheraton Norfolk Waterside Hotel, Norfolk, VA	$40,000	$200,000
2019	(Germany) Joshua Filler	(China) Wu Jia-qing	13–10	Mandalay Bay Resort, Las Vegas, NV	$50,000	$300,000
2021	(Philippines) Carlo Biado	(Singapore) Aloysius Yapp	13–8	Harrah's Resort, Atlantic City, NJ	$50,000	$300,000
2022	(Spain) Francisco Sánchez Ruiz	(Austria) Max Lechner	13–10	Harrah's Resort, Atlantic City, NJ	$50,000	$300,000
2023	(Chinese Taipei) Ko Ping-chung	(Russia) Fedor Gorst	13–6	Harrah's Resort, Atlantic City, NJ	$50,000	$300,000
2024	(United States) Fedor Gorst	(United States) Shane Van Boening	13–10	Harrah's Resort, Atlantic City, NJ	$50,000	$300,000
2025	(Singapore) Aloysius Yapp	(United States) Fedor Gorst	13–11	Harrah's Resort, Atlantic City, NJ	$100,000	$500,000
2026	(Spain) Francisco Sánchez Ruiz (2)	(Hong Kong) Robbie Capito	13-12	Embassy Suites, Frisco, TX	$100,000	$500,000

=== Records ===
- Earl Strickland and Shane Van Boening, both from the U.S., share the record for winning the U.S. Open 9-Ball Championship the most times: five. Strickland in (1984, 1987, 1993, 1997, 2000). Van Boening in (2007, 2012, 2013, 2014, 2016).
- Shane Van Boening holds the record for the most consecutive wins: three. (2012, 2013, 2014).
- Shane Van Boening holds the record for the most final appearances: six. (2007, 2012, 2013, 2014, 2016, 2024).
- The oldest pool player to ever win the men's tournament to date is Mike Lebrón of Puerto Rico, at 54 years old. The youngest player to win to date is Joshua Filler of Germany, at 21 years old.

== Top performers ==
Name	Nationality	Winner	Runner-up	Finals	Semi-final or better	Final stage appearances
**Shane Van Boening**	United States	5	1	6	6	11
**Earl Strickland**	United States	5	0	5	8	16
Mike Sigel	United States	3	2	5	12	16
Nick Varner	United States	2	2	4	6	9
David Howard	United States	2	2	4	4	10
Mika Immonen	Finland	2	1	3	5	8
Allen Hopkins	United States	2	1	3	3	12
Buddy Hall	United States	2	0	2	4	11
**Francisco Sánchez Ruiz**	Spain	2	0	2	3	5
Darren Appleton	England	2	0	2	2	6
Efren Reyes	Philippines	1	3	4	6	9
Johnny Archer	United States	1	2	3	7	15
Steve Mizerak	United States	1	1	2	5	12
**Ralf Souquet**	Germany	1	1	2	4	9
Alex Pagulayan	Canada	1	1	2	4	7
**Corey Deuel**	United States	1	1	2	3	8
**Fedor Gorst**	United States	1	1	2	3	5
**Aloysius Yapp**	Singapore	1	1	2	3	3
Mike Lebron	Puerto Rico	1	1	2	2	5
**Jeremy Jones**	United States	1	1	2	2	3
**Jayson Shaw**	Scotland	1	0	1	3	10
Rodney Morris	United States	1	0	1	3	8
Jimmy Reid	United States	1	0	1	2	6
**Joshua Filler**	Germany	1	0	1	2	6
Louie Roberts	United States	1	0	1	2	4
**Carlo Biado**	Philippines	1	0	1	2	3
**Ko Ping-chung**	Chinese Taipei	1	0	1	2	3
Tommy Kennedy	United States	1	0	1	2	3
Gabe Owen	United States	1	0	1	2	2
Reed Pierce	United States	1	0	1	1	2
John Schmidt	United States	1	0	1	1	1
Kevin Cheng	Chinese Taipei	1	0	1	1	1
Jose Parica	Philippines	0	2	2	5	12
Jim Rempe	United States	0	2	2	5	11
Dennis Orcollo	Philippines	0	2	2	5	6
Ronato Alcano	Philippines	0	2	2	2	5
Rodolfo Luat	Philippines	0	1	1	4	6
Chang Jung-lin	Chinese Taipei	0	1	1	3	5
Kim Davenport	United States	0	1	1	2	7
**Lee Vann Corteza**	Philippines	0	1	1	2	3
Tony Ellin	United States	0	1	1	2	2
**Thorsten Hohmann**	Germany	0	1	1	1	5
Karl Boyes	England	0	1	1	1	4
Dennis Hatch	United States	0	1	1	1	3
**Max Lechner**	Austria	0	1	1	1	3
Ray Martin	United States	0	1	1	1	3
Tang Hoa	United States	0	1	1	1	3
Takeshi Okumura	Japan	0	1	1	1	3
**Eklent Kaçi**	Albania	0	1	1	1	2
Pete Margo	United States	0	1	1	1	2
Mike Zuglan	United States	0	1	1	1	1
Shawn Putnam	United States	0	1	1	1	1
Wu Jia-qing	China	0	1	1	1	1

- Active participants are shown in **bold**.
- Only players who reached the final are included.
- Final stage appearances relates to players who reach the last 12 players of the event. As of 2019, final stages include last 16 players, due to format change.
- In the event of identical records, players are sorted in alphabetical order by first name.
