= International Challenge of Champions =

Pool tournament

The International Challenge of Champions was an annual nine-ball pool tournament held at the Mohegan Sun in Uncasville, Connecticut from 1991 to 2016. It has always been broadcast on ESPN and is sanctioned by the World Pool-Billiard Association.

As of 2009, four invited notable players compete in this single-elimination event. Different from other pool tournaments, this is a winner-take-all event: The winner earns the entire purse of the division (men's or women's); in 2009, the men's-division pot was US$25,000. Winners of either division earn the title "Champion of Champions".

== Format ==
Promoters describe the geared-for-television event as "international champions ... battling in short, sudden-death shootouts with pressure-cooker formats".

Each match is compose of two sets; each of them is race to 5 and in alternate break. Players lag to determine who shall break in the first set. The player who loses that set will break in the second.

A 30-second shot clock rule is used. This means a player must make a shot within 30 seconds lest the other player will receive ball-in-hand. Each player, however, can call for an extension but only once per rack.

Unlike other 9-ball tournaments, a player must call the 9-ball before pocketing it. Failing to call the shot or the 9-ball going in another pocket other than the one called will result the 9-ball being respotted and the player loses his turn at the table. Also, a player can't win a rack by pocketing the 9-ball in the break.

To win a match, a player has to win both sets. If the sets are split (one player winning the first but other player winning the next), players again lag to break at the one rack decider.

== Winners ==
Year	Winner	Runner-up
1991	(Puerto Rico) Mike Lebron	(United States) Buddy Hall
1992	(United States) Buddy Hall	(United States) Johnny Archer
1993	(United States) Allen Hopkins	(United States) Jim Rempe
1994	(United States) Nick Varner	(United States) Tony Ellin
1995	(Chinese Taipei) Chao Fong-pang	(Japan) Takeshi Okumura
1996	(Germany) Ralf Souquet	(United States) Earl Strickland
1997	(Germany) Oliver Ortmann	(Chinese Taipei) Chao Fong-pang
1998	(Chinese Taipei) Lee Kun-fang	(Japan) Kunihiko Takahashi
1999	(Philippines) Francisco Bustamante	(Germany) Oliver Ortmann
2000	(Germany) Oliver Ortmann (2)	(Philippines) Francisco Bustamante
2001	(Chinese Taipei) Chao Fong-pang (2)	(Philippines) Francisco Bustamante
2002	(Philippines) Efren Reyes	(Finland) Mika Immonen
2003	(Philippines) Francisco Bustamante (2)	(Canada) John Horsfall
2004	(Germany) Thomas Engert	(Germany) Thorsten Hohmann
2005	(Chinese Taipei) Chao Fong-pang (3)	(Germany) Thomas Engert
2006	(United States) Johnny Archer	(Germany) Thorsten Hohmann
2007	(Netherlands) Niels Feijen	(Philippines) Lee Vann Corteza
2008	(China) Fu Jianbo	(Philippines) Dennis Orcollo
2009	(Finland) Mika Immonen	(England) Darren Appleton
2010	(Finland) Mika Immonen (2)	(Philippines) Francisco Bustamante
2011	(England) Darren Appleton	(Netherlands) Huidji See
2012	(England) Darren Appleton (2)	(United States) Shane Van Boening
2014	(Germany) Thorsten Hohmann	(England) Darren Appleton
2015	(United States) Shane Van Boening	(Netherlands) Niels Feijen
2016	(Scotland) Jayson Shaw	(United States) Shane Van Boening

== Top performers ==
Name	Nationality	Winner	Runner-up	Finals
Chao Fong-pang	Chinese Taipei	3	1	4
Francisco Bustamante	Philippines	2	3	5
Darren Appleton	England	2	2	4
Mika Immonen	Finland	2	1	3
Oliver Ortmann	Germany	2	1	3
Shane Van Boening	United States	1	2	3
Thorsten Hohmann	Germany	1	2	3
Buddy Hall	United States	1	1	2
Johnny Archer	United States	1	1	2
Niels Feijen	Netherlands	1	1	2
Thomas Engert	Germany	1	1	2

- In the event of identical records, players are sorted in alphabetical order by first name.
