= 1999 WPA World Nine-ball Championship =

WPA World 9-Ball Championship 1999
Tournament information
- Sport: 9-ball
- Location: Alcante, Spain
- Dates: December 5, 1999–December 12, 1999
- Tournament format: Round robin / Single Elimination
- Host: WPA World Nine-ball Championship
- Participants: 64

Final positions
- Champion: (United States) Nick Varner
- Runner-up: (United States) Jeremy Jones

The 1999 WPA World Nine-ball Championship was a professional pool championship that took place in 1999 in Alicante, Spain. The event is not to be confused with Matchroom Sport's 1999 World Professional Pool Championship that took place earlier in the same year, won by Efren Reyes. Despite there being two world titles for the same discipline in 1999, both are considered as valid in 1999 by the World Pool-Billiard Association.

The event was won by Nick Varner, who defeated compatriot Jeremy Jones in the final 13–8. Defending champion Takahashi Kunihiko was defeated in the last 16 13–2 by Varner.

== Knockout stages ==
The following is the results from the knockout stages. Players competing had progressed through the earlier knockout round. All matches were played as race to 13 racks.

Last 16
(Japan) Takahashi Kunihiko	2
(United States) Nick Varner	13
(Japan) Satoshi Kawabata	9
(Germany) Sven Pauritsh	13
(Chinese Taipei) Hsiao Lang Fong	11
(Germany) Dieter Johns	13
(Canada) Edwin Montal	6
(Netherlands) Rico Diks	13
(Italy) Fabio Petroni	13
(Germany) Michael Schmidt	10
(Norway) Vegar Kristiansen	13
(Switzerland) Samuel Clemann	10
(United States) Johnny Archer	13
(Canada) Luc Salvas	6
(United States) Jeremy Jones	13
(Chinese Taipei) Shin-Young Park	4

Quarter-finals
(United States) Nick Varner	13
(Germany) Sven Pauritsch	6
(Germany) Dieter Johns	13
(Netherlands) Rico Diks	7
(Italy) Fabio Petroni	12
(Norway) Vegar Kristiansen	13
(United States) Johnny Archer	7
(United States) Jeremy Jones	13

Semi-finals
(United States) Nick Varner	13
(Germany) Dieter Johns	8
(Norway) Vegar Kristiansen	7
(United States) Jeremy Jones	13

Final
(United States) Nick Varner	13
(United States) Jeremy Jones	8
