= Mike Lebrón =

Puerto Rican pool player

Mike Lebron
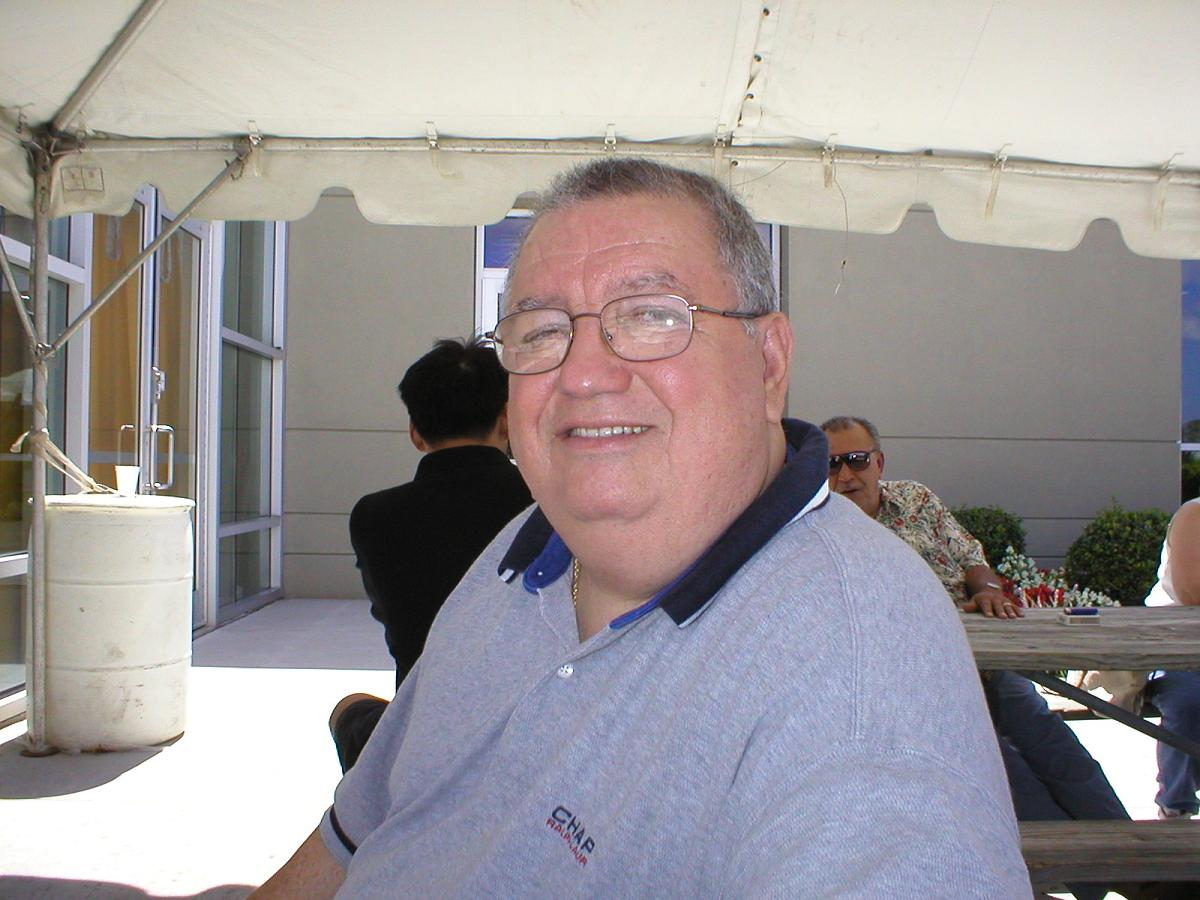
- Mike Lebron at the 2005 US Open Nine-ball Championship

Personal information
- Nickname: "Spanish Mike"
- Born: March 31, 1934 (age 92) Yabucoa, Puerto Rico

Pool career
- Country: Puerto Rico
- Turned pro: Quarter finals 1999 WPA World Nine-ball Championship

Miguel Benjamin Lebrón-Laboy (born March 31, 1934), is a Puerto Rican professional pool player nicknamed "Spanish Mike".

Lebrón currently lives in Philadelphia, Pennsylvania and actively competes at various pocket billiards events.

== Professional career ==
Lebrón is the winner of the thirteenth edition of the U.S. Open 9-ball Championship. Lebrón won the title against Nick Varner in 1988 and is the only Puerto Rican-born professional pool player to win a major title. He is also the oldest pool player to have ever won the US Open 9-Ball Championship at the age of 54 years old. In 1991, Lebrón won the International Challenge of Champions defeating Buddy Hall in the final match. Lebrón won $50,000, which was the largest first place prize in a pool tournament at the time.

On February 19, 2006, in his hometown of Yabucoa, Puerto Rico, Lebrón was inducted into the Yabucoa Sports Hall of Fame (Pabellón de la Fama del Deporte Yabucoeño). The induction ceremonies took place on June 11, 2006.

Lebrón is a member of the International Pool Tour.

== Titles and achievements ==
- 2006 Yabucoa Sports Hall of Fame
- 1998 Florida Senior Tour 9-Ball
- 1992 Glass City Open 9-Ball
- 1991 International Challenge of Champions
- 1990 Glass City Open 9-Ball
- 1989 Rak'em Up 9-Ball Classic Seniors
- 1988 U.S. Open 9-ball Championship
- 1988 Pool Hall Classic Open 9-Ball
- 1986 Suncoast Open 9-Ball

Preceded by Earl Strickland	US Open Nine-ball Champion; 1988	Succeeded by Nick Varner
