= Buddy Hall =

American pool player (1945–2025)

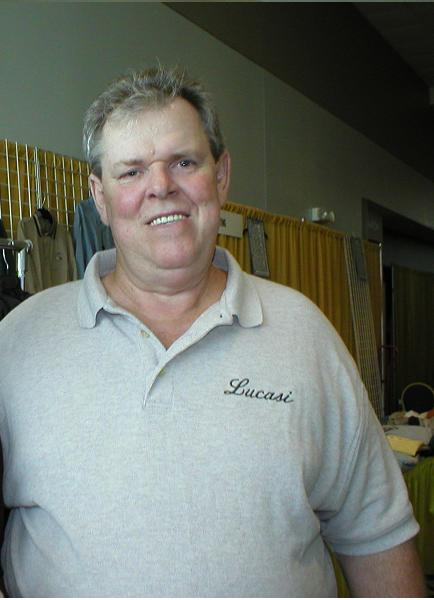
- Buddy at the 2003 US Open

Personal information
- Nickname: "The Rifleman"
- Born: May 29, 1945 Metropolis, Illinois, U.S.
- Died: May 22, 2025 (aged 79)

Pool career
- Country: United States
- Turned pro: 1970

Tournament wins
- Other titles: 100

Cecil P. "Buddy" Hall (May 29, 1945 – May 22, 2025) was an American professional pool player. International Pool Tour described Hall as a "living pool legend". He was nicknamed "the Rifleman" for his accuracy and had been a consistent top player for over two decades and virtually unbeaten when playing "money matches". Hall has been credited with creating the "clock system" which is a technique for where to hit the cue-ball, using the face of a clock as a gauge for where to aim.

Hall began playing at 14 years of age in a soda shop in his home town. When local pool rooms would not let him enter because of his age, he obtained a false birth certificate from a local judge which stated he was of legal age. He began his career at Herbie Lynn's pool room, soon dominating the regulars. It was not long before he hit the road to try his hand at a wider playing field. After watching many great players, he first gained prominence after beating some top players after he entered the Johnston City tournament in 1970.

"I went there to watch all the greats of the day play. Wimpy, Jersey Red, Eddie Taylor, Cornbread Red, Harold Worst, Jimmy Moore, Fats and U.J. were playing one another in both the tournament and in backroom ring games. I entered and was very pleased when I beat Wimpy and Jersey Red and won my entry fee back."

In the following years, Johnston City lost out as the hub of top tier tournament play to the Dayton Open Tournament. There, in 1974 organizer Joe Burns instituted a similar all-around tournament to what had been used in the Johnston City. Hall took All-Around first place there in 1974, winning $6,800. He continued to compete in the Dayton Open Tournaments for many years. In 1982 hall won the Caesar's Tahoe Nine-ball Championship by edging out Allen Hopkins in the final with a score of 11–6, winning $35,000 for his efforts; the biggest first prize money in a tournament at the time. Hall's win was announced on ESPN, which was the first ever mention of a billiard player on that cable television network. "The Rifleman" won a considerable number of 9-Ball tournaments that were held during the 1970s and through to the 2000s. In 1995 'Rags to Rifleman' was published; a biography of his life and career.

Hall died May 22, 2025, at the age of 79.

== Career ==
Buddy Hall was a winner of over 100 professional tournaments in pocket billiards. In 1974 Hall won one of his first events in the Dayton Open all-around tournament. Hall later in his career went on to win the U.S. Open 9-Ball Championship in 1991 and 1998. In the semi-finals of the 1991 Championship, Hall, after trailing Johnny Archer 7–1, ran eight consecutive racks in a row to win the match. Archer later stated on a TAR Podcast that Hall in the game of Nine-ball was: "The best I've ever seen, the best I've ever played". Hall was the thirty ninth inductee in the Billiard Congress of America's Hall of Fame, in the year 2000. He was named Player of the Year by the pool media, to include Pro Billiards Tour, National Billiard News and the Billiards Digest Magazine, in 1982, 1991, 1997 and 1998. A profile of Hall appeared in The Hustler column of the inaugural issue of The Snap Magazine, a story reputed to have "... in many ways set the tone for the magazine from there on out." He was a former member of the International Pool Tour and later retired from professional competition, although he sometimes competed on various regional tours and senior events throughout the United States.

Hall starred in the billiard movie, "The Tale of Texas Pool", that was released on December 25, 2024.

== Career titles and achievements ==
- 1974 Dayton Open 9-Ball
- 1974 Dayton Open All-Around
- 1975 Bakers 9-Ball Open
- 1975 Citrus 9-Ball Open
- 1975 Greenway 9-Ball Open
- 1976 Citrus 9-Ball Open
- 1978 Austin 9-Ball Open
- 1978 Virginia Beach 9-Ball
- 1978 Virginia Beach All-Around
- 1978 Southeastern 9-Ball Open
- 1978 Houston 9-Ball Open
- 1979 Corpus Christi 9-Ball Open
- 1979 Austin 9-Ball Open
- 1979 Memphis 9-Ball Open
- 1979 Houston 9-Ball Open
- 1979 Houston 8-Ball Open
- 1979 Jackson Mississippi 9-Ball Open
- 1979 Norfolk One-Pocket Open
- 1979 Gibbs Invitational 9-Ball
- 1979 Gibbs Invitational All-Around
- 1980 Sacramento 9-Ball Open
- 1981 Illinois 9-Ball Open
- 1982 St. Louie 9-Ball Open
- 1982 Jackson Mississippi 9-Ball Open
- 1982 Bowling Green 9-Ball Open
- 1982 Clyde Childress Memorial 9-Ball Open
- 1982 Caesars Tahoe Billiard Classic
- 1982 Billiards Digest Players of the Year
- 1983 Dayton 9-Ball Open
- 1983 Clinton 9-Ball Shootout
- 1983 Iowa State 9-Ball Open
- 1984 Tampa 9-Ball Shootout
- 1984 Dayton 9-Ball Open
- 1984 Caesars Tahoe Billiard Classic
- 1985 Cowboy Casino 9-Ball Open
- 1985 East Coast 9-Ball Open
- 1985 Charlotte 9-Ball Open
- 1985 Gibbs 9-Ball Shootout
- 1986 Florida State 9-Ball
- 1986 Cue Club 9-Ball Open
- 1986 Florida 9-Ball Open
- 1986 Fall Classic 9-Ball
- 1986 Florida Memorial Day 9-Ball Open
- 1986 Charlotte 9-Ball Open
- 1987 Lexington All-Star 9-Ball
- 1987 Carolina's Cup
- 1987 Colorado 9-Ball Open
- 1987 Glass City 9-Ball Open
- 1987 Super Bowl 9-Ball Open
- 1987 Denver 9-Ball Open
- 1987 Bruces 9-Ball Open
- 1988 Florida Master's 9-Ball Open
- 1988 Shane's Bar Table 9-Ball Open
- 1988 Grand Stand 9-Ball Open
- 1989 Citrus 9-Ball Open
- 1989 Florida Master's 9-Ball Open
- 1989 Willard's Classic 9-Ball
- 1989 Memphis 9-Ball Open
- 1990 U.J. Puckett 9-Ball Open
- 1990 Southern California 9-Ball Open
- 1991 Capital City 9-Ball Open
- 1991 U.S. Open 9-Ball Championship
- 1991 International 9-Ball Classic
- 1991 Bicycle Club 9-Ball Invitational
- 1991 Billiards Digest Players of the Year
- 1992 Rak'M Up Classic 9-Ball
- 1992 International Challenge of Champions
- 1992 Champs Billiards 9-Ball Open
- 1992 Southern California 9-Ball Open
- 1993 Challenge Match Race to 45 vs. (Johnny Archer)
- 1993 Hard Times 9-Ball Open
- 1993 Nashville 9-Ball Open
- 1994 Bowling Green 8-Ball Open
- 1995 PBT Commonwealth Cup 9-Ball
- 1996 Florida State 9-Ball Championship
- 1997 Senior Tour Tulsa
- 1997 Florida State 9-Ball Championship
- 1998 Florida Senior Tour 9-Ball
- 1998 Pine Needles Seniors Open
- 1998 Viking Cue Pro Warm Up
- 1998 Florida Tour 9-Ball
- 1998 Texas Open 9-Ball Championship
- 1998 Camel Shooters Nine-ball Open
- 1998 U.S. Open 9-Ball Championship
- 1998 Legends of One-Pocket Championship
- 1998 National Billiard News Player of the Year
- 2000 Florida State 9-Ball Championship
- 2000 Florida Tour 9-Ball
- 2000 Billiard Congress of America Hall of Fame
- 2001 Florida Tour 9-Ball
- 2001 Gibbs 14.1 Tournament
- 2001 Florida Open 9-Ball
- 2001 Lucasi Central Florida 9-Ball Open
- 2001 Derby City Classic One Pocket
- 2002 Midwest Tour 9-Ball
- 2004 Gulf Coast Classic Bank Pool
- 2005 Senior Masters 9-ball Championship
- 2005 Hard Times One Pocket
- 2006 Shooter's Billiards One Pocket
- 2007 Lucasi Open 9-Ball
- 2008 Shooter's Billiards One Pocket
- 2011 One Pocket Hall of Fame

Preceded by Nick Varner	US Open Nine-ball Champion; 1991	Succeeded by Dennis Hatch
Preceded by Earl Strickland	US Open Nine-ball Champion; 1998	Succeeded by Tang Hoa
