= Thorsten Hohmann =

German pool player (born 1979)

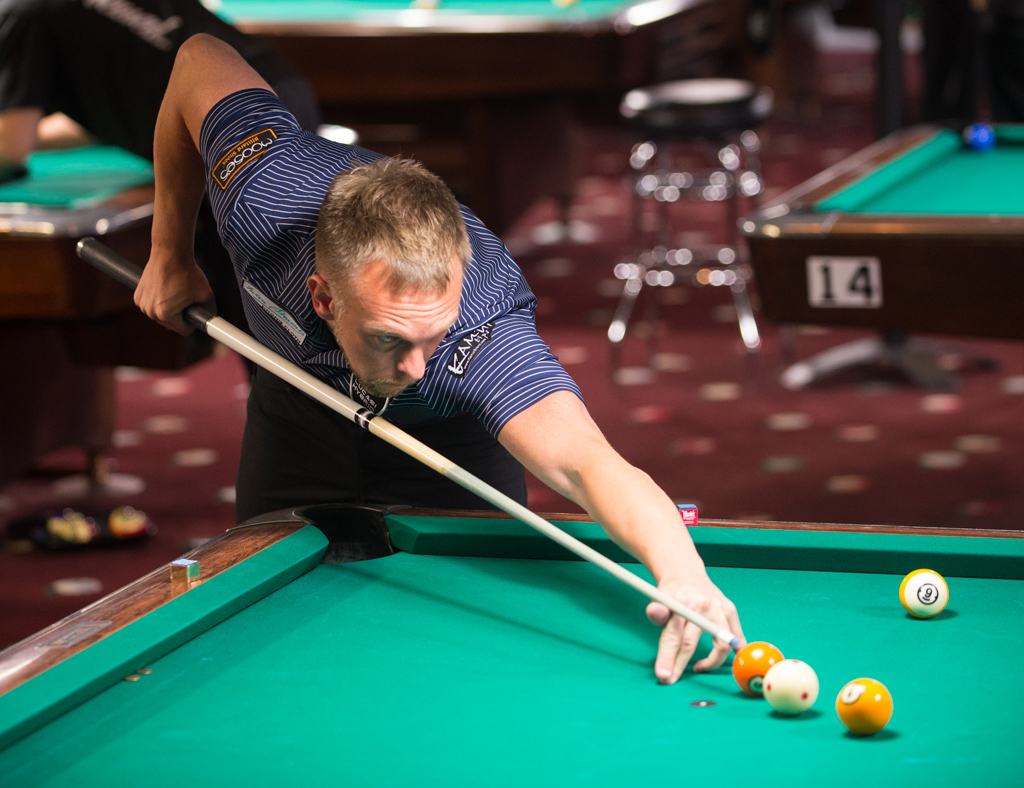

Personal information
- Nickname: The Hitman
- Born: 14 July 1979 (age 47) Fulda, Hesse, West Germany

Pool career
- Country: United States
- Turned pro: 2001

Tournament wins
- World Champion: Nine-ball (2003, 2013), Straight pool (2006)
- Highest rank: 1
Medal record
Men's Nine-ball
Representing Germany
World Games
Silver medal – second place	2005 Duisburg	Individual

Thorsten Hohmann (born 14 July 1979) is a German professional pool player, nicknamed "the Hitman." He is a three-time world champion, winning the WPA World Nine-ball Championship in 2003, and 2013, and winning the WPA World Straight Pool Championship in 2006.

== Career ==
=== Early life ===
Thorsten was born and raised in Fulda, Germany and at a very young age had always been interested in sports, playing football, table tennis and badminton. At the age of nine Thorsten's father took him to a local pool hall. On his 10th birthday Thorsten received a miniature pool table. By age twelve Thorsten and a friend began playing pool at a local pool hall. By age 16 he had won his first open adult tournament, of 128 players in the state of Hessia.

=== Europe-based career ===
In 2003 Hohmann reached the finals of the World Pool League but lost to Rodney Morris, 8–3. Later in 2003, Thorsten would win the 2003 WPA World Nine-ball Championship, defeating previous champion Earl Strickland in the semi-final, before defeating Alex Pagulayan in the final 17–10. He became the third German to become World Champion after Oliver Ortmann (1995) and Ralf Souquet (1996).

=== US-based career ===
In 2004, Hohmann signed on to be managed by US- and South Korea-based event promotions company Dragon Promotions, who transplanted the German-resident champion to Jacksonville, Florida, as a base of practice and preparation for US competitions. Hohmann then signed with Florida-based sponsors Lucasi Cues and Universal Smartshaft as their official representative and spokesperson. He remains a German citizen, but a US permanent resident. Thorsten has since been featured on the cover of many pool magazines.

In 2004, Hohmann reached the finals of the US Open Nine-ball Championship. However, he lost to Gabe Owen, 3–11.

The year 2005 was his most successful to date as he dominated a number of tournaments, including the BCA Open Nine-ball Championship, the Sudden Death Seven-ball event and the World Pool League.

In 2006, he won the inaugural World Straight Pool Championship by defeating Thomas Engert 200–80. Later, he defeated Marlon Manalo 8–7 to win the IPT North American Open Eight-ball Championship with a first prize of US$350K. The IPT prize set a record as the largest first prize ever won in a pool tournament at that time. However, Efren Reyes beat the record shortly afterwards by winning $500,000 in the 2006 IPT World Open Eight-ball Championship, the second major IPT event.

== Career titles ==
- 2025 International Open Straight Pool
- 2021 Billiard Congress of America Hall of Fame
- 2019 Steinway Classic 10-Ball
- 2018 Dragon 14.1 Tournament
- 2015 CSI U.S. Open 10-ball Championship
- 2015 Archer Cup 10-Ball
- 2015 Dragon 14.1 Tournament
- 2014 International Challenge of Champions
- 2014 Manny Pacquiao Cup 10-Ball
- 2014 WPBL Bonus Ball Team Championship
- 2013 WPA World Nine-ball Championship
- 2013 Dragon 14.1 Tournament
- 2013 Accu-Stats 14.1 Invitational
- 2013 Maryland 14.1 Championship
- 2013 Kremlin Cup
- 2011 Philippine Open 10-Ball
- 2011 Dragon 14.1 Tournament
- 2011 World Cup of Pool - with (Ralf Souquet)
- 2010 All Japan Championship 9-Ball
- 2009 China Open 9-Ball Championship
- 2008 Asian 10-Ball Championship
- 2008 Accu-Stats 14.1 Invitational
- 2008 Quezon City Invasion
- 2007 European Pool Championship 9-Ball
- 2006 IPT North American Eight-ball Championship
- 2006 Turning Stone Classic
- 2006 WPA World Straight Pool Championship
- 2005 World Pool League
- 2005 ESPN Sudden Death Seven-ball
- 2005 European Pool Championship 14.1
- 2005 BCA Open 9-Ball Championship
- 2004 German Pool Championship 9-Ball
- 2004 European Pool Championship 8-Ball
- 2003 German Pool Championship 14.1
- 2003 WPA World Nine-ball Championship
- 2003 Continental Team Cup
- 2003 New Jersey State 14.1
- 2003 Euro Tour Netherlands Open
- 1998 German Pool Championship 8-Ball
