= Hippie Jimmy Reid =

American pool player

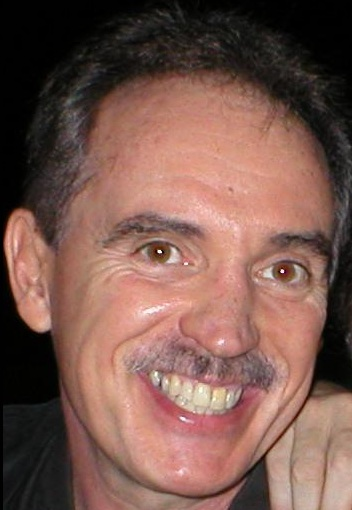
Jimmy Reid in September 2003 at U.S. Open 9-Ball Championship in Norfolk, Virginia.

Jimmy Reid (August 23, 1946 – September 28, 2016) was an American professional pool player. He was given the Lifetime of Pool in Action Award at the One Pocket Hall of Fame banquet in Louisville, Kentucky. His nicknames were "Hippie Jimmy" and "Diamond Jim".

== Career ==
Born in Birmingham, Alabama. Reid was raised in Gloucester, Massachusetts, an old New England fishing port. He frequented the Olympia Billiard Room aka "The Mines", which is where veteran pool players such as Boston Shorty, Bob Ingersol, and "Cuban Joe" Valdez frequented.

He went on the road shooting pool as a teenager during pool's golden years. By the time he entered the Johnston City pool tournaments in Johnston City, Illinois, produced by brothers George and Paulie Jansco in the 1960s, he was playing championship-level pool. He later connected with Keith McCready in California.

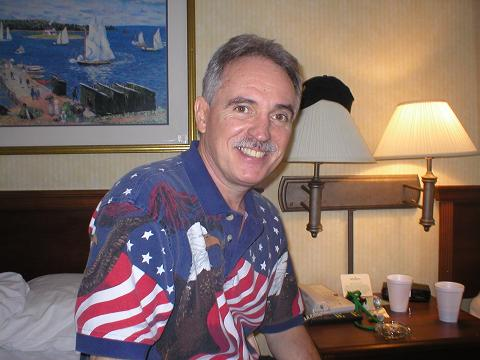
Reid in 2004 at Derby City Classic in Louisville, Kentucky.

== Titles and achievements ==
- 1974 Southwest Open 9-Ball Championship
- 1977 Lansing City 9-Ball Championship
- 1979 BCA National 8-Ball Tournament
- 1980 Las Vegas 8-Ball Classic
- 1981 Champagne 9-Ball Open
- 1981 Joe Farhat's 9-Ball Open
- 1983 Adrian 9-Ball Open
- 1985 U.S. Open 9-Ball Championship
- 1988 King of the Rings 9-Ball
- 1992 European Open 8-Ball
- 1992 European Open 9 Ball
- 1993 European Open 8-Ball
- 1993 German Open 9-Ball
- 1994 Spring Hill 9-Ball Open
- 2008 Lifetime Pool in Action Award
