= 2016 U.S. Open 9-ball Championship =

Tournament information
- Dates: 16–22 October 2016
- Venue: Sheraton Norfolk Waterside Hotel
- City: Norfolk, Virginia
- Country: United States
- Organisation: World Pool-Billiard Association
- Format: Double elimination

Final
- Champion: (United States) Shane Van Boening
- Runner-up: (Chinese Taipei) Chang Jung-Lin
- Score: 13-6

The 2016 US Open 9-Ball Championships 2016 was an international pool tournament in the discipline 9-Ball, from 16 to 22 October 2016 at Sheraton Norfolk Waterside Hotel in Norfolk, Virginia, United States. It was the 41st entry of the U.S. Open 9-Ball Championships. The American Shane Van Boening won the event with a 13–9 final victory against the Taiwanese Chang Jung-Lin to win his fifth US Open. van Boening's fifth title put him equal for the most wins with Earl Strickland. Third place went to Jayson Shaw .

Defending champion was the Kevin Cheng. However, after defeats against Hsieh Chia-chen and Antonio Lining, Cheng lost in the double elimination round without a win.

== Tournament format ==
The tournament was played as a double-elimination tournament and as a race to 11 under winner break rules.

== Rankings ==
The following were the 32 best placed players.

| Place | Player |
|---|---|
| 1 | (United States) Shane Van Boening |
| 2 | (Chinese Taipei) Chang Jung-Lin |
| 3 | (Scotland) Jayson Shaw |
| 4 | (Philippines) Dennis Orcollo |
| 5 | (United States) Jeremy Jones |
| 5 | (Spain) David Alcaide |
| 7 | (Canada) Alex Pagulayan |
| 7 | (Chinese Taipei) Chang Yu-lung |
| 9 | (Chinese Taipei) Ko Ping-chung |
| 9 | (United States) Brandon Shuff |
| 9 | (Saudi Arabia) Abdullah al-Shammari |
| 9 | (Chinese Taipei) Ko Pin-yi |
| 13 | (Chinese Taipei) Hsieh Chia-chen |
| 13 | (United States) Mike Dechaine |
| 13 | (Philippines) Carlo Biado |
| 13 | (Philippines) Warren Kiamco |

| Place | Player |
|---|---|
| 17 | (United States) Josh Roberts |
| 17 | (Japan) Naoyuki Ōi |
| 17 | (England) Mark Gray |
| 17 | (England) Daryl Peach |
| 17 | (Spain) Francisco Sánchez Ruiz |
| 17 | (England) Imran Majid |
| 17 | (Chinese Taipei) Hsu Kai-lun |
| 17 | (United States) Justin Bergman |
| 25 | (United States) Jeremy Sossei |
| 25 | (Albania) Eklent Kaçi |
| 25 | (Austria) Mario He |
| 25 | (United States) Corey Deuel |
| 25 | (Finland) Mika Immonen |
| 25 | (Netherlands) Nick van den Berg |
| 25 | (Poland) Radosław Babica |
| 25 | (Chinese Taipei) Wu Kun-lin |
