= U. J. Puckett =

American pool player

Utley Jim Puckett (April 7, 1911 – June 22, 1992) was an American professional pool player.

== Biography ==
Puckett was born in Prattsville, Arkansas, in 1911. His father was killed in a logging mishap when Puckett was 5 years old. He was talented in pool from an early age, and won the national nine-ball title in later years.

During the 1970s, Utley Puckett frequented The Golden Nugget pool hall on W. Seventh Street in Fort Worth, Texas, run by Gary Cecora. Pucket would turn down most offers to play with his trademark lopsided smile, "I can't play any more". He preferred to hold court as the dean of the hustlers. He always had a ready smile and a fresh quip for everyone, from oldtime pool players like Magnolia Red (J.R. Richardson) to any guy just in off the street. Puckett befriended and offered playing tips to many up and coming players like Robert Newkirk and Frank "Bird" Thompson. You could always find him at Oaklawn Park in Arkansas hustling the bars and pool rooms along with other players like Allen Ailshie and Mexican Johnny during the 70s. U.J. was impossible to forget; he had a big voice, ready smile and huge personality, his white hair stuck out from under a big hat, and his shuffling gait emphasized his size fourteen double narrow loafers.

After becoming blind and suffering two strokes, he died in 1992, at age 81. Years after his death, there have been rumors of his spirit's presence at a pool hall in Texas.

He referred to his assistant as "Retardo" and could be heard to remark "go get my cue, Retardo".

== Achievements ==
- 2025 Texas Billiards Hall of Fame
