= IPT World Open Eight-ball Championship =

Pool tournament

The IPT World Open Eight-ball Championship was an eight-ball pool tournament held between 3–9 September 2006 at the Grand Sierra Resort in Reno, Nevada, by the International Pool Tour. It was the third and last event of the tour It was the richest event in the history of cue sports. The total purse was $3M where $500K was offered to the winner.

== Summary ==
The tournament held a total of 200 players (150 tour members and 50 qualifiers). The players were divided into several groups of certain numbers. Those leading in each group proceeded into the next round where they were placed into new groups. Every match was a race to 8.

Efren Reyes was the victor defeating Rodney Morris 8 games to 6. After the event no new tournaments were held again by the IPT.

== Prize fund ==
	Prize money
Winner	$500,000
Finalist	$150,000
Semi finalist	$92,000
Total	$3,000,000

== See also ==
- List of world eight-ball champions
