= Sheraton Norfolk Waterside Hotel =

Waterslide Hotel

Coordinates: 36°50′37″N 76°17′22″W

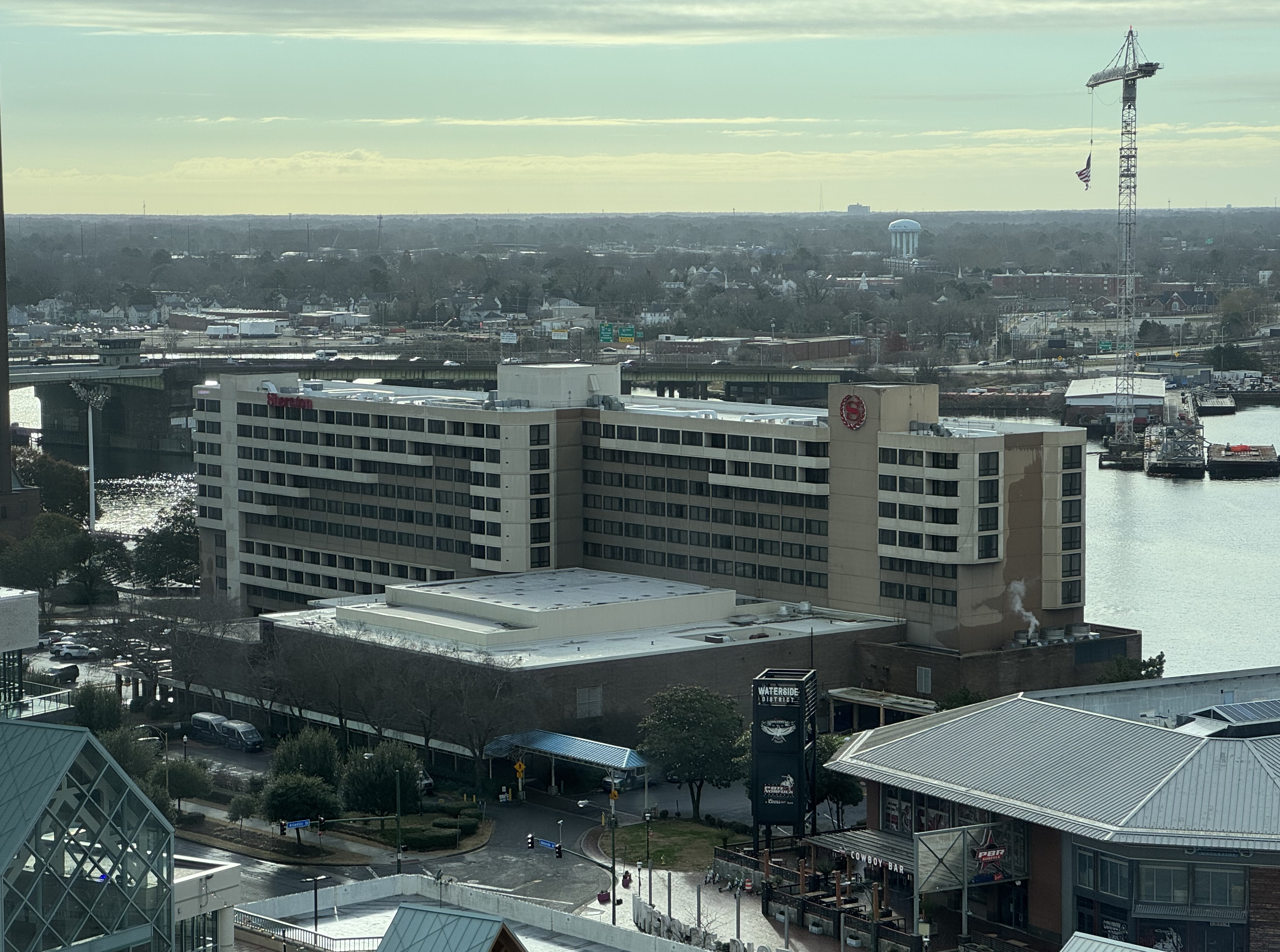
Sheraton Norfolk Waterside Hotel (2024)

Sheraton Norfolk Waterside Hotel, originally built in 1976 as the Downtown Norfolk Omni International Hotel and later known as Omni Norfolk Waterside Hotel, is a 10-story structure in the business district of Norfolk, Virginia, United States. It became a Sheraton Hotel in 1998.

Construction of the hotel began in 1974, and was completed in Jan. 1976 at a cost of $18 million.

== History of renovations ==
The hotel underwent its first major renovations in 2007. Another $12 million renovation was completed in 2018.

== See also ==
- History of Norfolk, Virginia
- History of Hampton Road, Virginia
