= Takeshi Okumura =

Japanese professional pool player (born 1952)

Personal information
- Born: 24 April 1952 (age 74) Fukuoka, Japan

Pool career
- Country: Japan
- Turned pro: 1978

Tournament wins
- World Champion: 9-Ball (1994)
- Highest rank: 1

Takeshi Okumura (奥村 健, Okumura Takeshi) (born April 24, 1952) is a Japanese professional pool player.

== Professional career ==
He started playing pool at 16 and turned professional ten years later.

Okumura won the WPA World Nine-ball Championship in 1994, defeating Yasunari Itsuzaki in an all Japanese final. With the win, he became the first male Japanese player to win a world championship in pocket billiards. Until Nick Varner won the world 9-Ball title in 1999, Okumura was the oldest champion.

Although he won the world nine-ball crown, Okumura wasn't quite successful in the sport for the next ten years. In 1995, he almost won the International Challenge of Champions but Chao Fong-pang of Taiwan bested him in the last match. He also was closing to winning the U.S. Open 9-ball Championship in 2000 but lost to Earl Strickland, 5–11, in the finals. He nearly had a shot for a second world title in 2002 but again was defeated by Earl Strickland in the semis.

After some less impressive past performances, Okumura showed dominance one last time, in 2005. He defeated Mika Immonen in the finals to win the All Japan Championship, the longest running tournament in the world, featuring players from Japan and the rest of the world.

== Titles ==
- 2018 Billiard Congress of Japan Hall of Fame
- 2005 All Japan Championship 9-Ball
- 1999 Japan Open 9-Ball
- 1995 All Japan Championship 9-Ball
- 1995 Japan Open 9-Ball
- 1994 WPA World Nine-ball Championship
- 1994 Japan Open 9-Ball
- 1993 All Japan Championship 9-Ball
- 1988 Japan Open 9-Ball
- 1985 All Japan Championship 9-Ball
- 1984 All Japan Championship 14.1
- 1982 All Japan Championship All-Around
- 1982 All Japan Championship Rotation
- 1982 All Japan Championship 14.1
- 1981 All Japan Championship All-Around
- 1981 All Japan Championship 9-Ball
- 1980 All Japan Championship All-Around
- 1980 All Japan Championship Rotation
- 1980 All Japan Championship 9-Ball
- 1980 All Japan Championship 14.1
- 1979 All Japan Championship All-Around
- 1979 All Japan Championship 14.1
