= Chao Fong-pang =

Taiwanese pool player (born 1967)

Personal information
- Born: 15 September 1967 (age 58) Kaohsiung, Taiwan

Pool career
- Country: Chinese Taipei
- Pool games: Nine-ball, Eight-ball

Tournament wins
- World Champion: Nine-ball (1993, 2000)
Medal record
Men's pool
Representing Chinese Taipei
Asian Games
| Gold medal – first place | 1998 Bangkok | Eight ball individual |
| Bronze medal – third place | 1998 Bangkok | Nine ball individual |

Chao Fong-pang (Chinese: 趙豐邦; pinyin: Zhào Fēngbāng; born 15 September 1967 in Kaohsiung, Taiwan) is a Taiwanese professional pool player.

== Career ==
He won the WPA World Nine-ball Championship in 1993 against Thomas Hasch of Germany. Thus, he became the first male Chinese Taipei player to win a world championship in pocket billiards.

In 1995, he won the International Challenge of Champions against Japan's Takeshi Okumura, who was won the 1994 world champion in nine-ball.

Three year later, he won the gold medal in the eight-ball event of the Asian Games.

Chao regained the World Nine-ball Championship for the second time in 2000 by defeating Mexico's Ismael Paez, 17–6. The score was the largest winning margin ever made in a World Championship final.

In 2001, Chao won the International Challenge of Champions for the second time, defeating Francisco Bustamante who won the event in 1999. He won the event for a third time in 2005 with a victory over the defending champion Thomas Engert.

== Titles ==
- 2005 International Challenge of Champions
- 2001 International Challenge of Champions
- 2000 WPA World Nine-ball Championship
- 1998 Asian Games Eight-ball Singles
- 1997 Asian Nine-ball Championship
- 1996 Asian Nine-ball Championship
- 1995 International Challenge of Champions
- 1995 Peace World All-Star Championship
- 1993 WPA World Nine-ball Championship
