= Efren Reyes =

Filipino pool player (born 1954)

Efren Reyes OLD, PLH
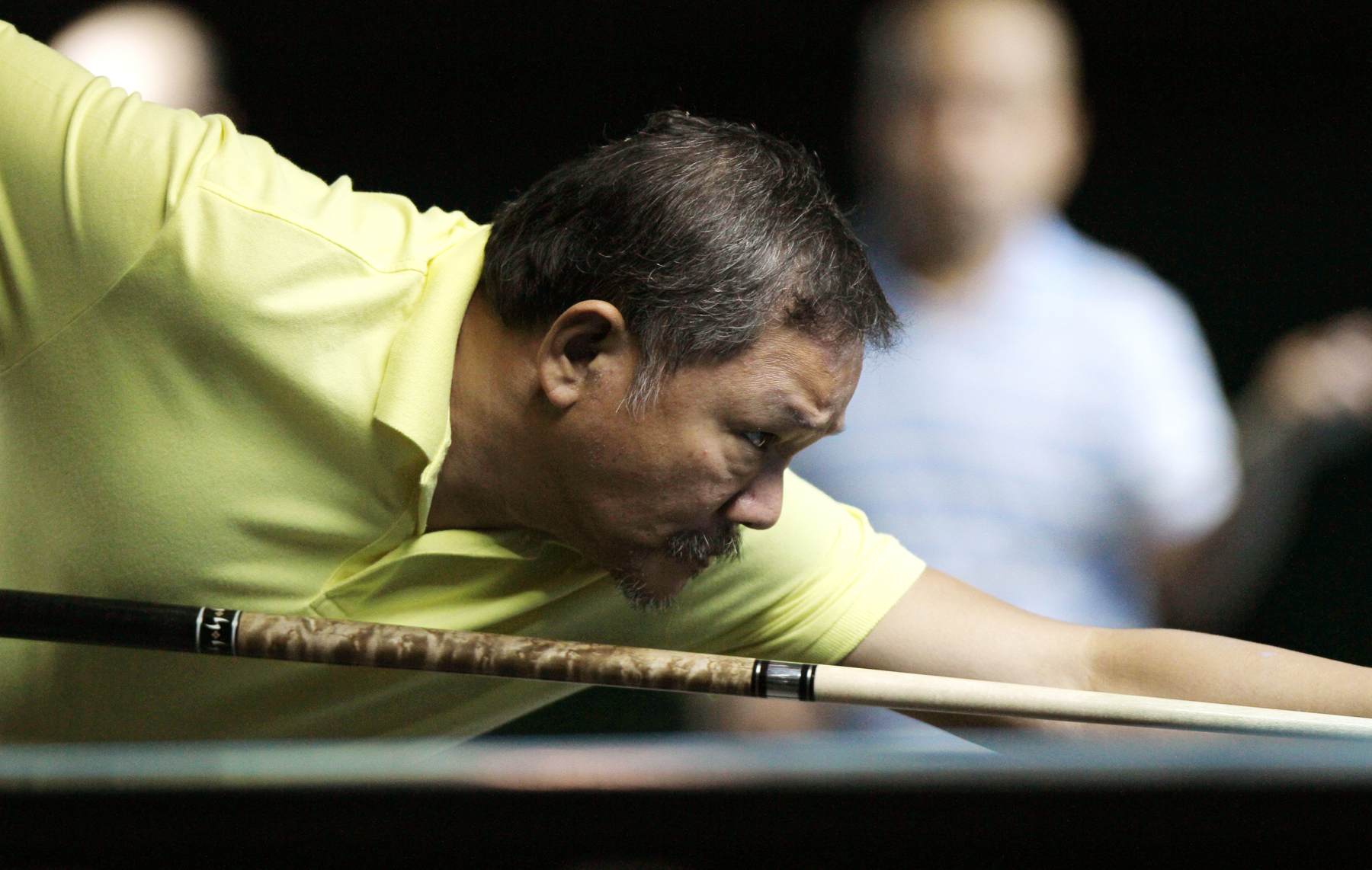
- Reyes at the 2012 WPA World Nine-ball Championship

Personal information
- Nicknames: "The Magician", "Bata"
- Born: August 26, 1954 (age 72) Angeles, Pampanga, Philippines

Pool career
- Country: Philippines
- Turned pro: 1978
- Pool games: Nine-ball, eight-ball, ten-ball, one-pocket, rotation, balkline, three-cushion, one-cushion

Tournament wins
- Major: U.S. Open Pool Championship (1994), World Cup of Pool (2006), (2009)
- Other titles: 100
- World Champion: Nine-ball (1999), Eight-ball (2004)
Medal record
Representing Philippines
Men's eight-ball
Asian Games
Bronze medal – third place	2002 Busan	Singles
Southeast Asian Games
Gold medal – first place	1987 Jakarta	Singles
Silver medal – second place	2001 Kuala Lumpur	Singles
Men's rotation
Southeast Asian Games
Gold medal – first place	1991 Manila	Team
Gold medal – first place	1999 Bandar Seri Begawan	Singles
Gold medal – first place	1999 Bandar Seri Begawan	Doubles
Silver medal – second place	2001 Kuala Lumpur	Singles
Men's snooker
Southeast Asian Games
Gold medal – first place	1987 Jakarta	Doubles
Bronze medal – third place	1987 Jakarta	Team
Bronze medal – third place	1991 Manila	Team
Men's English billiards
Southeast Asian Games
Gold medal – first place	1987 Jakarta	Singles
Bronze medal – third place	2001 Kuala Lumpur	Team
Men's 47/1 balkline billiards
Silver medal – second place	1987 Jakarta	Singles
Men's one-cushion billiards
Southeast Asian Games
Bronze medal – third place	2003 Saigon	Singles
Bronze medal – third place	2011 Palembang	Singles
Bronze medal – third place	2013 Naypyidaw	Singles
Bronze medal – third place	2015 Kallang	Singles
Bronze medal – third place	2019 Manila	Singles
Bronze medal – third place	2021 Hanoi	Singles
Men's nine-ball
Southeast Asian Games
Bronze medal – third place	2003 Saigon	Singles
Men's three-cushion billiards
Southeast Asian Games
Bronze medal – third place	2011 Palembang	Singles

Efren Manalang Reyes OLD PLH (born August 26, 1954) is a Filipino professional pool player. A winner of over 100 international titles, Reyes was the first player to win world championships in two different pool disciplines. Among his numerous titles, Reyes is a four-time World Eight-ball champion, the 1999 WPA World Nine-ball Championship winner, the 1994 U.S. Open Pool Championship winner, a two-time World Pool League champion, a four-time All Japan Championship winner, a seven-time Asian Nine-ball Tour champion, and a thirteen-time Derby City Classic winner. Reyes also represented the Philippines at the World Cup of Pool, winning the event with partner Francisco Bustamante in 2006 and 2009. By defeating American player Earl Strickland in the inaugural The Color of Money event in 1997, Reyes took home the largest single match purse in pool history of $100,000. Many analysts, fans and players consider Reyes to be the greatest pool player of all time.

Reyes is nicknamed "the Magician"—for his ability on the pool table—and "Bata" (Filipino for "kid or child"), to distinguish him from an elder pool player by the same name. In addition to pool, Reyes has played international billiards, specifically one-cushion and three-cushion.

== Early life ==
Reyes was born in Pampanga, Philippines, on August 26, 1954. He moved to Manila at age five to live with his uncle, who owned a pool hall. He cleaned the hall and slept on the tables. Because Reyes was not tall enough to reach the pool table, he played while standing on Coca-Cola cases that he moved around.

Gambling from a young age, he won his first match for money aged nine and continued to compete at three-cushion billiards in the 1960s and 1970s. After establishing himself as a winner, he was discovered by promoters. This gave him the opportunity to compete in larger tournaments.

== Career ==
In 1983, Reyes took on Pepito Dacer in the finals of the Philippine Rotation Championship. The finals were played in race-to-39 and the players competed over 11 racks on a weekly basis. On the seventh week of play, Reyes defeated Dacer 39–32. During the 1980s, when Reyes was considered a top-class player in his homeland but not yet internationally recognized, he went to the United States to hustle. Reyes claims to have earned $80,000 in a single week, making him a folk hero back in the Philippines.

Reyes began winning a number of tournaments in the United States, Europe and parts of Asia, garnering attention and recognition worldwide. At the start of his career, he used aliases such as "Cesar Morales" to hide his identity so he would be allowed to compete. Reyes became internationally known at the U.S. Open 9-Ball Championship in 1994. Having finished third in 1985, he defeated Nick Varner in the finals and became the first non-American to win the event.

Two years later, Reyes and Earl Strickland were chosen to compete in an event, named after the recently released film The Color of Money. The event was a three-day race-to-120 challenge match of nine-ball. It was held in Hong Kong, with a winner-take-all prize of $100,000. Reyes won the match 120–117 despite being 17 racks behind, to win the all-time largest purse in any professional pool event. In 1999, Reyes won the first televised World Pool Championship that was hosted by Matchroom Pool, earning $60,000, which was the largest first-place prize in a pool tournament. At the time, the tournament was not recognized by the World Pool-Billiard Association, which ran their own event, although they later acknowledged the event was an official World Championship. This made Reyes the second Filipino player after Jose Parica to win a world championship in pocket billiards. In 2001, Reyes participated in the 2001 Tokyo 9-Ball Open, the event had over 700 players participating. Reyes won the event, beating Niels Feijen in the finals 15–7 and earning $163,000 first prize. At the time, this was the largest first prize in a pool tournament.

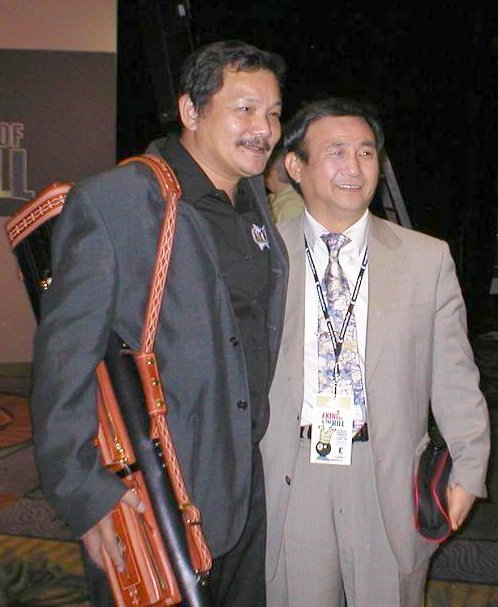
Efren "Bata" Reyes (left) after winning the 2005 IPT King of the Hill Shootout

Reyes won the 2002 International Challenge of Champions, defeating Mika Immonen in a deciding rack. He reached the final of the 2004 WPA World Eight-ball Championship, where he met Marlon Manalo in the final. He trailed 0–4, but won eight straight racks and won the final 11–8. The win made Reyes the first player to win WPA world championships in more than one discipline.

Reyes won the 2005 International Pool Tour King of the Hill Eight-ball Shootout, winning $200,000, which was the largest first-place prize of any pool tournament at the time. In the final, he met Mike Sigel in a best-of-three sets match, winning 8–0 in the first set and 8–5 in the second. The following year, Reyes won the IPT World Open Eight-ball Championship over Rodney Morris 8–6, earning $500,000. However, due to IPT's financial problems, he has not been able to claim this sum.

Reyes partnered with Francisco Bustamante to represent the Philippines at the inaugural World Cup of Pool. They reached the 2006 final, where they met Earl Strickland and Rodney Morris representing the United States. They won seven consecutive racks to win the final 13–5. He also won the 2009 event once again partnering Bustamante. The pair met the German team of Ralf Souquet and Thorsten Hohmann in the final and won 11–9.

In 2019, Reyes was still actively competing in international professional pool. Overall, he is the most successful player at the Derby City Classic, having won the overall championship on six occasions. He has also won five bronze medals at the Southeast Asian Games and an eight-ball bronze medal at the 2002 Asian Games. Despite suggestions that his skill had declined by 2019, his games still attracted large crowds at the 2019 and 2021 Southeast Asian Games.

Reyes continues to play professionally. In 2023, he participated in the Derby City Classic one-pocket tournament, placing third.

== Media and persona ==
Reyes is known for his highly creative play. Reyes is often called by his nickname "Bata", a Filipino word which means "kid" in English, given to him by close friends to distinguish him from an older Efren who also played pool. Reyes' ability to play kick shots led to his gaining the nickname "Magician". Wishing to continue hustling when he first arrived in the United States, Reyes took the name Cesar Morales as he knew other players had heard his name but did not know what he looked like.

In 2003, Reyes was featured in the Filipino movie Pakners with actor Fernando Poe Jr., which was Poe's last film before his run for presidency and then death later in 2004. Reyes also appeared in the 2007 short film Nineball. In one episode of the TV series Magpakailanman, the story follows a young Efren "Bata" Reyes (portrayed by Anjo Yllana) in his early pool-playing days as he progresses from a money player to a tournament contender.

Reyes lives in Angeles City, with his wife Susan and their three children. He considers balkline to be his favorite cue sport, and plays chess as a hobby.

== Accolades ==
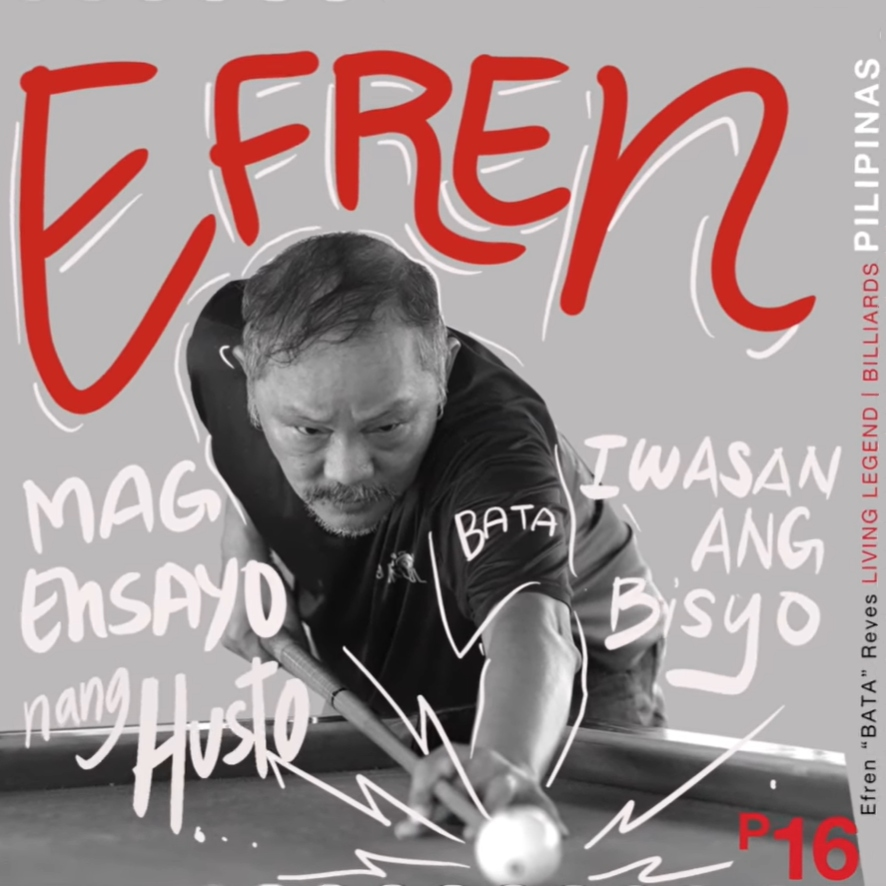
Reyes on a 2021 stamp of the Philippines

Numerous fellow professional players have credited Reyes with being the greatest living player in the world. During ESPN television commentary on a semi-final match between Reyes and Mika Immonen at the 2000 BCA Open Nine-ball Championship, veteran professional Billy Incardona stated that Reyes was "indisputably the best player in the world—especially when you consider all games—he can play any game as well as anyone, maybe better than anyone ... In my opinion we're watching probably the greatest player in my lifetime and I've been watching pool for the better part of forty years."

In 1995, Billiards Digest magazine named Reyes the Player of the Year. The following year, when Reyes was ranked number one on the United States' Pro Billiards Tour, the June 1996 issue of the magazine featured a poll of "billiard cognoscenti"—pro players, billiards writers, industry insiders and the like—to pick the best in billiards in various categories. Billiards' own elite named Reyes the best one-pocket player of all time. The magazine wrote, "While a bevy of one-pocket geniuses abound, Efren Reyes, whose prowess in one-pocket is sometimes obscured by his 9-ball [sic] stardom, was the popular pick. Is there anything Bata can't do?"

Reyes became the first Asian to be inducted into the Billiard Congress of America Hall of Fame in 2003. He was also inducted into the One Pocket Hall of Fame in 2004. Reyes was appointed Philippine Sports Ambassador for the 2005 Southeast Asian Games.

Reyes has been awarded the Philippine Sportswriters Association Sportsman of the Year on three occasions: in 1999, 2001, and 2006. He was given the Philippine Legion of Honor, and included in Time magazine's 60 Asian heroes in 2006. He was also awarded the Philippine Order of Lakandula "Champion for Life Award" in 2006. Reyes was named "Player of the Decade" for the 2000s by the U.S. Billiard Media Association.

Reyes has topped the AZ Billiards Money list five times: 2001, 2002, 2004, 2005, and 2006. He also holds the record for highest recorded earnings of any pool player, being the most money won in tournament play in a season, winning $645,000 in 2006.

In 2024, Reyes was inducted into the inaugural World Billiards Hall of Fame held at the newly opened World Billiards Museum in Yushan, China. Reyes was among the five inductees announced in the greatest players category. An annual five on five tournament between Asia and Europe was dedicated in Reyes' name, titled the Reyes Cup.

=== International ===
- 1995 Billiards Digest Player of the Year
- 2003 Billiard Congress of America Hall of Fame
- 2004 One Pocket Hall of Fame
- 2006 Time Magazine's 60 Asian heroes
- 2010 U.S. Billiard Media Association Player of the Decade - 2000s
- 2018 Asian Culture Day Lifetime Achievement Award
- 2024 World Billiards Museum Hall of Fame
- 2026 Best in Billiards 250 years- Best One Pocket Player Award

=== National ===
- 1999 Philippine Legion of Honor
- 1999 The Outstanding Filipino Award
- 1999 Philippine Sportsman of the Year
- 2001 Philippine Sportsman of the Year
- 2006 Philippine Sportsman of the Year
- 2006 Order of Lakandula Champion for Life Award
- 2010 Philippine Sports Hall of Fame
- 2019 Philippine Sports Lifetime Achievement Award

=== Titles and achievements ===
Reyes is a winner of over 100 professional tournaments, including:

- WPA World Eight-ball Championship (2004)
- WPA World Nine-ball Championship (1999)
- U.S. Open Nine-ball Championships (1994)
- U.S. Open One-Pocket Championship (2000, 2011)
- PBT Riviera Eight-ball Championship (1995, 1996)
- PBT Riviera Team Championship (1993)
- Sands Regency Nine-ball Open (1985, 1986, 1995, 1999)
- Las Vegas Nine-ball Open (2003)
- Masters Nine-ball Championship (1988, 2001)
- Manny Pacquiao Ten-ball Championship (2014)
- Predator International Ten-ball Championship (2010)
- Derby City Classic
  - One-pocket (1999, 2004, 2005, 2006, 2007, 2014)
  - Master of the Table (1999, 2004, 2005, 2007, 2010)
  - Nine-ball (2005, 2010)
- WPA Asian Nine-ball Tour
  - Vietnam Leg (2004, 2006,)
  - Indonesia Leg (2005, 2006,)
  - Manila Leg (2003,)
  - Singapore Leg (2003,)
  - Taiwan Leg (2004,)
- ESPN Challenge
  - Ultimate 9-Ball Challenge (1999)
  - Ultimate Champions Shootout (1999)
- Tokyo Open Nine-ball (1992, 2001)
- Japan Open Nine-ball (2005)
- All Japan Championship (1979, 1990, 1999, 2003)
- International Pool Tour
  - IPT King of the Hill Eight-Ball Shootout (2005)
  - IPT World Open Eight-ball Championship (2006)
- International Challenge of Champions (2002)
- World Cup of Pool (2006, 2009) - with (Francisco Bustamante)
- World Pool League (2001, 2002)
- World Mixed Doubles Classic - with Rubilen Amit (2009, 2011,)
