= Tony Ellin =

American pool player

"Hurricane" Tony Ellin
- Ellin in competition
- Born: July 19, 1965; New Jersey, U.S.
- Died: June 14, 2000 (aged 34); Ladson, South Carolina, U.S.

Tony Ellin (July 19, 1965 – June 14, 2000) was a top-ranked American professional pool player nicknamed "Hurricane," who specialized in the game of nine-ball. Born in New Jersey, Ellin resided in Ladson, South Carolina, near Charleston, and was a touring professional player in the 1990s. He was killed on June 14, 2000, at age 34, when his 1999 Cadillac collided with a locomotive less than a block from his home. Ellin was alone in his car when the accident occurred. Lt. Mike Benton, a Charleston County sheriff, said Ellin was "apparently trying to beat the train to the crossing." Ellin had played in the Sands Regency Open just days before his death. He was survived by wife Shelby, and daughter Ashley Annette who was just 3 years old at the time of his death. Later that year a Tony Ellin memorial tournament was held at Brass Tap and Billiards in Raleigh, North Carolina, with receipts to benefit the Ashley Ellin Scholarship Fund, which was formed to benefit Ellin's daughter after his death.

Ellin was well known for his powerhouse break shot and, according to Ellin, that earned him his nickname: "My strength is my break. The guys on tour call me "Hurricane Tony" after Hugo, because of the powerful breaks I have." A competitor stated in a 1998 interview that "Tony has one of the best breaks in the world... he's got so much power it just explodes the balls." At the tournament where the interview was conducted, Ellin pocketed six balls on the break at the beginning of one game, proving the point.

When asked what the secret was to aiming, Ellin responded: "I would say that aim is basically trial and error and instinct, using your judgment. I may look at the path from the pocket through the object ball, but I hardly do that anymore. You develop an instinct for aiming from playing all the time".

== Rankings and wins ==
Ellin was the U.S.'s Professional Billiard Tour's (PBT) 4th ranked player as of 1993, and had made several appearances on ESPN in climbing to that spot. That year Ellin came in second at the U.S. Open 9-Ball Championship, losing to Earl "the Pearl" Strickland in the final.

By 1994 Ellin was ranked third on the PBT and had won the 1994 Sand Regency XIX tournament in Reno, Nevada, and the Joblin Open, in New Bedford, Massachusetts. He placed second in the Bay State Shootout in Worcester, and the Dallas Open, and had come in third in the U.S. Open, just shy of his performance the year prior.

He had many third-place finishes as well, including at the Sands Regency XXII, at the Legends of 9-Ball in June, 1996, at the Sands Regency XXV in 1997, and at Chalker's San Francisco 9-Ball Classic in June, 1995.

He was ranked 21st on the Camel Pro Billiard Series as of 1999 and 51st the year of his death.

== Titles ==
- 1989 Michigan 9-Ball Open
- 1991 Akron 9-Ball Open
- 1992 South Carolina 9-Ball Open
- 1992 Akron 9-Ball Open
- 1994 Spring Fling 9-Ball Open
- 1994 Sands Regency 9-Ball Open
- 1994 George Joblin Memorial 9-Ball
