= Thomas Engert =

German professional pool player

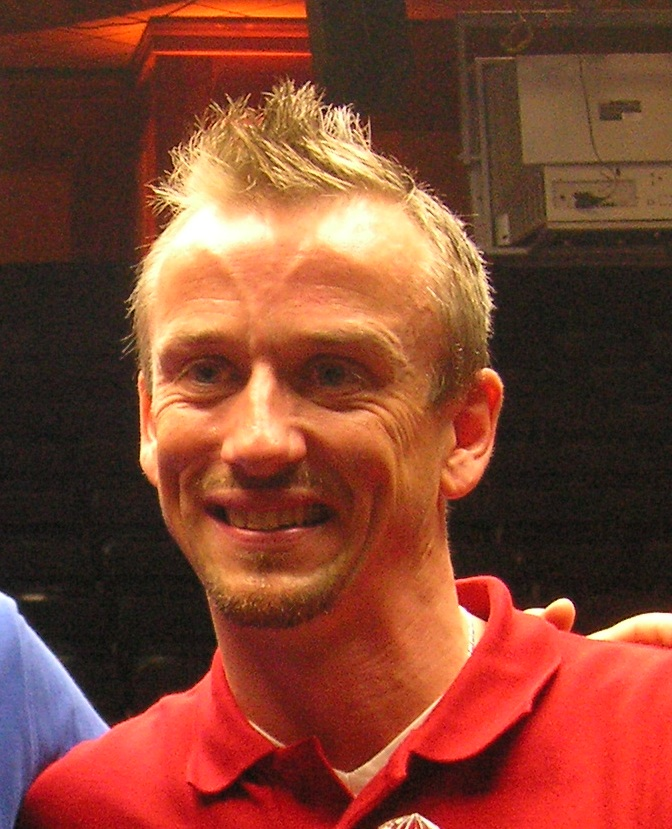

Medal record

Representing Germany

Men's Nine-ball

World Games
Bronze medal – third place	2001 Akita	Individual

Thomas Engert is a German professional pool player. Engert won the 2004 International Challenge of Champions beating fellow German Thorsten Hohmann in the finals. When he returned to the tournament one year later, Engert was close to winning it for the second consecutive time but Chao Fong-pang, who was then the two-time winner of the event, defeated him in the finals.

== Career ==
Engert has won the German Pool Championships more than any other player, on 20 occasions.

In 2004, Engert won the World Pool Masters over another fellow German, Oliver Ortmann.

In the 2006 World Straight Pool Championship, Engert made his way into the final but loss to Thorsten Hohmann by a score of 200–80. In 2007, Engert won the World Pool Masters for the second time. This included him with Francisco Bustamante and Ralf Souquet who won the event more than once.

== Titles & achievements ==
- 2008 Euro Tour Germany Open
- 2007 World Pool Masters
- 2006 UPA Predator Florida Open
- 2005 Euro Tour Swiss Open
- 2004 World Pool Masters
- 2004 International Challenge of Champions
- 2004 Euro Tour Italian Open
- 2004 German Pool Championship 14.1
- 2004 European Pool Championship 9-Ball
- 2003 German Pool Championship 8-Ball
- 2002 German Pool Championship 14.1
- 2001 European Pool Championship 14.1
- 2001 German Pool Championship Team
- 1999 German Pool Championship Team
- 1998 Euro Tour Poland Open
- 1997 German Pool Championship 14.1
- 1997 Euro Tour Spain Open
- 1997 German Pool Championship Team
- 1996 German Pool Championship 9-Ball
- 1996 Euro Tour Netherlands Open
- 1996 German Pool Championship 8-Ball
- 1996 German Pool Championship 14.1
- 1994 Euro Tour Germany Open
- 1994 German Pool Championship 8-Ball
- 1994 European Pool Championship 14.1
- 1993 German Pool Championship 8-Ball
- 1993 European Pool Championship 14.1
- 1992 Euro Tour Hungarian Open
- 1992 German Pool Championship 8-Ball
- 1992 Euro Tour Dutch Open
- 1991 German Pool Championship 8-Ball
- 1991 European Pool Championship 9-Ball
- 1990 German Pool Championship 9-Ball
- 1990 German Pool Championship 8-Ball
- 1990 European Pool Championship 9-Ball
- 1990 German Pool Championship 14.1
- 1989 German Pool Championship 8-Ball
- 1989 European Pool Championship 9-Ball
- 1989 German Pool Championship 9-Ball
- 1988 German Pool Championship 9-Ball
