= Paul Potier =

Canadian pool player (born 1954)

Paul Richard William Potier (born July 12, 1954, in Winnipeg, Manitoba, Canada) is a Canadian professional pool player and two-time Canadian nine-ball champion.

== Career ==
Besides being a touring professional, Paul has been a trick shot artist, coach/teacher, tournament director and promoter, league operator, board member of various associations (including past president of the Canadian Professional Billiards Association), pool hall manager/designer/consultant/pro, billiards industry consultant, and referee and referee trainer.

In 2001, he captained Team Canada to a silver medal in the International Team Championships in Taiwan.

In 2005 he represented Canada at the World Games in Germany.

== Titles and achievements ==
Titles and achievements between 1985 and 2007:

- 2007 Stan James Canadian Pro Tour event in Kelowna, BC, 2nd place
- 2007 Seattle Open Champion, Uncle Jacks Billiards
- 2006 Ranked #44 on the IPT Tour
- 2005 Represented Canada in the World Games in Germany
- 2005 McKittric Open Champion, Raggs Rack Room, Eureka, California
- 2005 Pechaur Tour event at Breaktime Billiards, California 2nd place
- 2005 Ranked #2 on the Pechaur Tour
- 2004 Pechaur Tour Panama Red's Champion
- 2004 Pechaur Tour Ballroom Billiards, Langley, BC, 2nd place
- 2002 Kanto Open Champion, Shibuya Japan
- 2001 Represented Canada in the World Games in Japan
- 2001 Captain of team Canada – Silver Medalist in the World Team Nine-ball in Taiwan
- 2001 Border Battle, Team Canada member
- 2000 CPBA Canadian Nine-ball Champion
- 1999 Dufferin Billiards Tour Canadian Nine-ball Champion
- 1999 Winner of 8 out of 9 events in the Northwest
- 1999 All Japan Championships 3rd Place.
- 1998 Canadian Professional Nine-ball Tour – Player of the Year and #1 ranking
- 1998 Winner of many events on the CPBA Tour
- 1998 Ranked in the top 32 on the RJR Tour in the US
- 1997 Canadian Professional Nine-ball Tour - Player of the Year
- 1997 Winner of many events on the CPBA Tour
- 1996 Canadian Nine-ball Championships, 2nd Place
- 1996 Blondie's Open Nine-ball Champion CPBA Tour Event
- 1996 Dallas Million Dollar Challenge, PCA, 3rd place
- 1996 Triple D Nine-ball Champion
- 1996 Ranked #4 on the PCA Tour in the US
- 1996 All Japan Championships, 3rd Place
- 1993 PBTA World Nine-ball Championships, 3rd place
- 1993 All Japan Championships, Amagasaki, Japan 3rd place
- 1991 Manitoba Eight-ball Champion
- 1991 Manitoba Snooker Champion
- 1990 Manitoba Eight-ball Champion
- 1989 Manitoba Eight-ball Championships, 2nd place
- 1988 Manitoba Eight-ball Championships, 2nd place
- 1988 Manitoba Snooker Championships, 2nd place
- 1985 Central Canadian English Billiard Champion

== Awards ==
In 2004 he finished the season ranked #2 on the Pechaur Tour. Potier was Canadian Professional Player of the Year twice.
