= Nick Varner =

American pool player (born 1948)

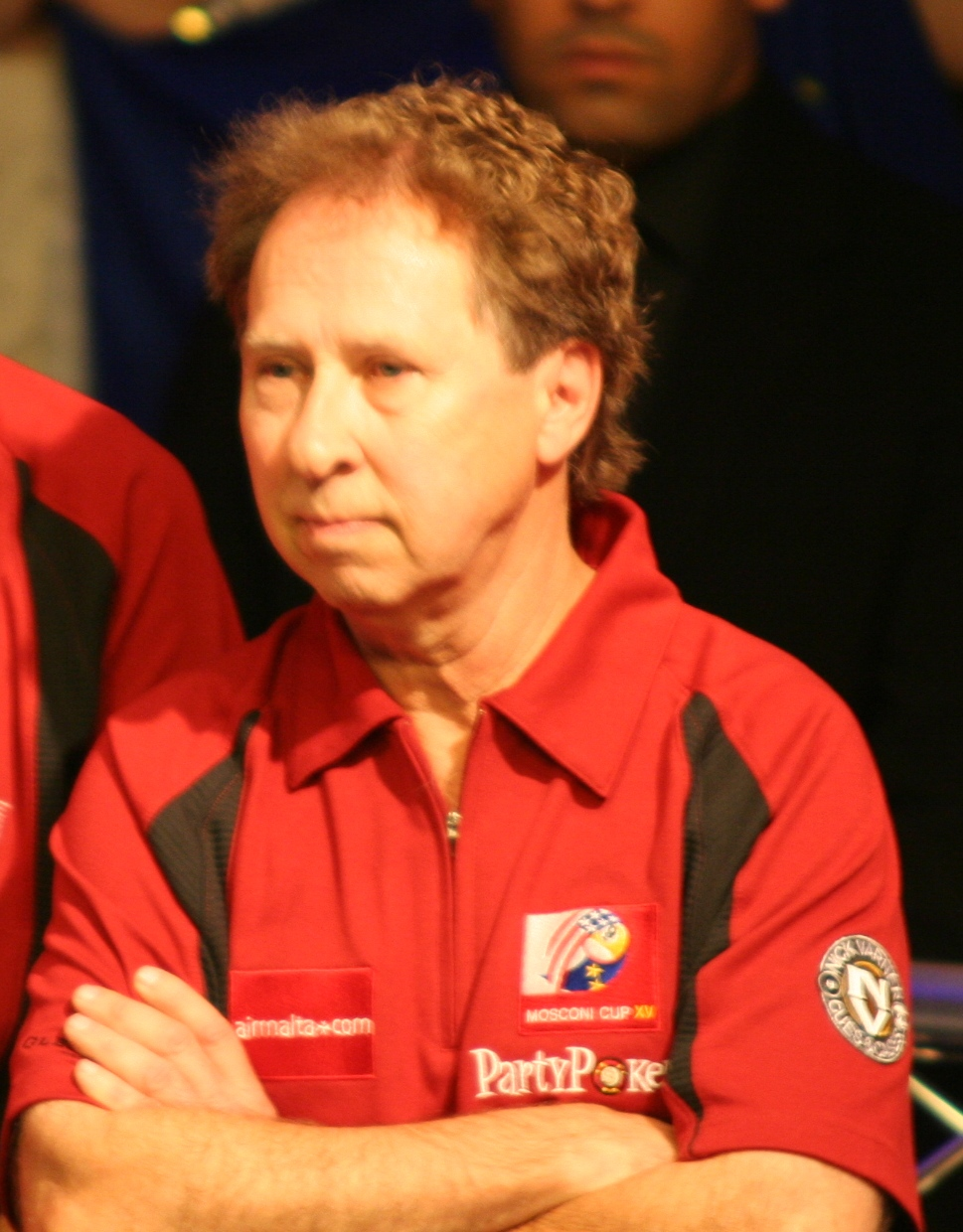
- Varner at 2008 Mosconi Cup

Personal information
- Nickname: "Kentucky Colonel"
- Born: 15 May 1948 (age 78) Owensboro, Kentucky, U.S.

Pool career
- Country: United States
- Turned pro: 1971

Tournament wins
- Other titles: 100
- World Champion: Straight Pool (1980, 1986), Nine-Ball (1989, 1999)
- Highest rank: 1

Nick Varner (born May 15, 1948) is an American professional pool player who was inducted into the Billiard Congress of America Hall of Fame in 1992. Varner is widely considered one of the greatest pool players of all time. Varner is a multiple world champion and has won back to back U.S. Open 9-Ball Championships, in addition to being the oldest player to ever win the WPA World Nine-ball Championship, at 51 years old.

== Career ==
Nick D. Varner graduated from Tell City High School in Tell City, Indiana in 1966. Varner learned to play pool in his father's (Nick Varner) pool hall in Grandview, Indiana. After graduating from high school, Varner gained notoriety on the professional pool scene after he won two ACU-I Intercollegiate Championships while attending Purdue University and playing "money games" at an on-campus pool room called "The Hole". A cliché given to Varner was "Speak softly and carry a big stick" because of the way he conducted himself as well as his competitive endeavors.

In 1989, Varner became only the second man (after Mike Sigel) to earn over $100,000 in prize winnings in single year, accumulating an unprecedented 8 out of the 16 Nine-ball PBA tour events that year. The same year he won the PBA World 9-Ball Championship, after a hill-hill final against Grady Mathews.

He was named Player of the Year in 1980, 1982, 1989, 1994, by the pool media, including the National Billiard News and Billiards Digest Magazine. He also represented Team USA eight times at the Mosconi Cup, four times as a non-playing team captain.

Varner is also an author, a video personality, a pool room proprietor, a manufacturer's representative, and an exhibition player.

Varner is considered one of the best all-around players of all time, winning multiple titles in Nine-ball, Eight-ball, Straight Pool, One Pocket and Bank Pool.

Varner was inducted into the BCA, One Pocket and Bank Pool Hall of Fame.

Nick starred in the billiard movie, "The Tale of Texas Pool", released on December 25, 2024.

== Career titles and achievements ==
- 1969 ACUI Collegiate National Championship
- 1970 ACUI Collegiate National Championship
- 1974 Midwest Open 9-Ball
- 1975 Kentucky Open 14.1 Championship
- 1975 Texas Open 14.1 Championship
- 1976 Rockford 14.1 Championship
- 1976 Midwest Open 9-Ball
- 1979 Lexington All-Star Tournament
- 1980 PPPA World Straight Pool Championship
- 1980 Kentucky Open 9-Ball
- 1980 BCA National 8-Ball Tournament
- 1980 Illinois Open 9-Ball
- 1980 Billiards Digest Players of the Year
- 1981 Kentucky Open 9-Ball
- 1982 ABC Sports 9-Ball Invitational
- 1982 Kentucky Open 9-Ball
- 1982 Bowling Green Open Bank Pool
- 1982 Prestonburg Open 9-Ball
- 1982 Owensboro Open 9-Ball
- 1982 National Billiard News Player of the Year
- 1983 San Jose Open 9-Ball
- 1983 Kentucky Open 9-Ball
- 1983 National Open 9-Ball
- 1983 Fresno Open 9-Ball
- 1983 Midwest Open 9-Ball
- 1983 McDermott Masters 9-Ball Championship
- 1984 Kentucky Open 9-Ball
- 1984 Tennessee State 9-Ball
- 1985 Chattanooga Open 9-Ball
- 1985 Tennessee State 9-Ball
- 1985 Zurich Open 9-Ball
- 1986 PPPA World Straight Pool Championship
- 1986 Charlotte Open 9-Ball
- 1986 Sacramento Open 9-Ball
- 1986 Midwest Open 9-Ball
- 1987 McDermott Masters 9-Ball Championship
- 1988 Glass City Open 9-Ball
- 1988 Scranton Invitational 9-Ball
- 1988 Tennessee Open 9-Ball
- 1988 Sands Regency 9-Ball Open
- 1989 U.S. Open 9-Ball Championship
- 1989 Rak'em Up 9-Ball Classic
- 1989 Knoxville 9-Ball Open
- 1989 PBA World 9-Ball Championship
- 1989 Governors Cup 9-Ball
- 1989 Glass City Open 9-Ball
- 1989 Sands Regency 9-Ball Open
- 1989 Golden 8-Ball Invitational
- 1989 Scranton Open 9-Ball
- 1989 Lexington All-Star 9-Ball
- 1989 Akron Open 9-Ball
- 1989 Billiards Digest Players of the Year
- 1990 U.S. Open 9-Ball Championship
- 1990 Al Romero Classic 9-Ball
- 1990 West End All-Around Shoot Out
- 1990 Challenge Match Race to 60 vs. (Efren Reyes)
- 1990 Philippine 9-Ball Series
- 1991 Rak'M Up Classic 9-Ball
- 1991 Billiards Digest Best 9-Ball Player
- 1991 Billiards Digest Best All-Around Player
- 1991 PBA Sportsperson of the Year
- 1992 International One Pocket Championship
- 1992 Super Bowl 9-Ball Open
- 1992 Billiard Congress of America Hall of Fame
- 1993 Lexington All-Star 9-Ball
- 1994 International Challenge of Champions
- 1994 PBT SeaGate Eight-ball Championship
- 1994 Lexington All-Star 9-Ball
- 1994 Billiards Digest Players of the Year
- 1996 Sands Regency 9-Ball Open
- 1996 Roanoke One Pocket
- 1996 McDermott Eastern States One Pocket
- 1997 Mosconi Cup
- 1997 Music City 9-Ball Open
- 1997 Sands Regency 9-Ball Open
- 1998 Music City 9-Ball Open
- 1998 Mosconi Cup
- 1999 WPA World Nine-ball Championship
- 1999 Derby City Classic Bank Pool
- 1999 Senior Tour Tulsa 9-Ball
- 1999 Senior Tour Player of the Year
- 1999 Billiards Digest 6th Greatest Living Player of the Century
- 2000 Derby City Classic One Pocket
- 2000 Music City Classic
- 2000 Senior Masters 9-Ball Championship
- 2000 Legends of One-Pocket Championship
- 2001 Superman Classic 9-Ball Tournament
- 2001 Mosconi Cup
- 2001 Sunshine State One Pocket Tour CM's Place
- 2001 Sunshine State One Pocket Tour Kiss Shot Billiards
- 2001 Sunshine State One Pocket Tour Capone's Billiards
- 2001 Sunshine State One Pocekt Tour Sharp Shooters
- 2001 Hard Times One Pocket
- 2002 Border Battle, Team USA Vs Team Canada
- 2002 Jacksonville 9-Ball Open
- 2002 Glass City Open 9-Ball
- 2002 Music City Classic
- 2003 Seminole Pro Tour
- 2004 Border Battle, Team USA VS Team Canada
- 2005 One Pocket Hall of Fame
- 2007 Great Southern 9-Ball Tour
- 2011 Bank Pool Hall of Fame
- 2023 Seniors One-Pocket Classic
