= 2001 WPA World Nine-ball Championship =

WPA World 9-Ball Championship 2001
Tournament information
- Sport: 9-ball
- Location: Cardiff, Wales
- Dates: July 14, 2001–July 22, 2001
- Tournament format: Round robin / Single Elimination
- Host(s): WPA World Nine-ball Championship, Matchroom Pool
- Participants: 128

Final positions
- Champion: (Finland) Mika Immonen
- Runner-up: (Germany) Ralf Souquet

The 2001 WPA World Nine-ball Championship was the 12th edition of the WPA World Championship for 9-Ball Pool. It took place from July 14 to 22, 2001 in Cardiff, Wales.

Mika Immonen won the event, defeating German Ralf Souquet in the final, winning 17–10.

== Format ==
The 128 participating players were divided into 16 groups, in which they competed in round robin mode against each other. The top four players in each group qualified for the final round played in the knockout system.

=== Prize money ===
The event's prize money stayed similar to that of the previous years, with winner Mika Immonen winning $65,000.

Position	Prize
First Place (champion)	$65,000
Second Place (runner-up)	$30,000
Third Place (semi-finalist	$17,500
Fifth place (quarter finalist)	$8,500
Ninth place (loser in round of 16)	$4,000
Seventeenth place (loser in round of 32)	$2,000
Thirty Third (loser in round of 64)	$1,500
Sixty Fifth place (Fifth or sixth in round robin group)	$1,000
Eighty First place (Seventh place in round robin group)	$500

== Preliminary round ==
The following 64 players dropped out in the group stage:

	5. Place	6. Place	7. Place	8. Place
Group 1:	(Sweden) Tom Storm	(Brazil) Fabio Luersen	(Greece) Apostolis Alexandris	(England) Andy Battams
Group 2:	(Brazil) Jorge de Souza	(Chinese Taipei) Pan Shen-ping	(Croatia) Ivica Putnik	(Norway) Vegar Kristiansen
Group 3:	(Greece) Evangelos Vettas	(Malaysia) Patrick Ooi	(Australia) Lou Condo	(England) Andrew Richardson
Group 4:	(Japan) Kunihiko Takahashi	(United States) Danny Basavich	(South Africa) Dino Nair	(Spain) Diego Pedro Simon
Group 5:	(Poland) Pawel Rogalski	(Russia) Evgeny Stalev	(Germany) Daniel Dutz	(Finland) Aki Heiskanen
Group 6:	(Philippines) Rodolfo Luat	(South Korea) Park Shin-young	(Wales) Paul Davies	(United States) Bill Stephen
Group 7:	(Philippines) Warren Kiamco	(England) Joe Johnson	(Canada) Gerry Watson	(New Zealand) Bruce Anderson
Group 8:	(Wales) Rob McKenna	(Norway) Raymond Hauge	(United States) George SanSouci	(Greece) Athanasios Vrakas
Group 9:	(South Korea) Jeong Young-hwa	(Japan) Adsushi Shiraiwa	(Denmark) Kasper Thygesen	(New Zealand) Brent Wells
Group 10:	(Belgium) Jan Dulst	(Scotland) Ross McInnes	(Japan) Kiyotaka Ohashi	(Australia) Robert Pleiner
Group 11:	(Japan) Kenichi Uchigaki	(England) Mark Selby	(New Zealand) Jimmy Hendry	(Argentina) Juan Silva
Group 12:	(United States) Jon Kucharo	(Sweden) Niklas Bergendorff	(Japan) Akikumo Tashikawa	(Wales) Mark Williams
Group 13:	(Chinese Taipei) Kang Chin-ching	(England) Imran Majid	(France) Vincent Facquet	(Peru) Manuel Chau
Group 14:	(Germany) Thomas Engert	(Denmark) Peter Nielsen	(Wales) Dominic Dale	(Australia) Warren King
Group 15:	(Thailand) Surathep Phoochalam	(Canada) Luc Salvas	(South Korea) Lee Jang-su	(United States) Paul Smith
Group 16:	(Netherlands) Rico Diks	(United States) Dee Adkins	(Slovakia) Matjaž Erčulj	(Namibia) Arnold van Staden

== Final round ==
Round of 64
(Germany) Ralf Souquet	9
(Luxembourg) Marc Holtz	7
(Japan) Takashi Toda	9
(Germany) Christian Reimering	3
(Chinese Taipei) Yang Ching-shun	9
(Indonesia) Dodong Alwi	2
(England) Kevin Smith	9
(Argentina) Jorge Llanos	2
(Sweden) Marcus Chamat	9
(Canada) Paul Potier	3
(Czech Republic) Lukas Krenek	9
(Netherlands) Nick van den Berg	8
(United States) Earl Strickland	9
(Philippines) Ramil Gallego	8
(Germany) Andreas Roschkowsky	9
(Chinese Taipei) Hsia Hui-kai	4
(Switzerland) Dimitri Jungo	9
(Mexico) Ismael Páez	7
(Spain) David Alcaide	9
(Netherlands) Alex Lely	7
(United States) Jeremy Jones	9
(England) Steve Knight	1
(United States) Troy Frank	9
(England) Phil Harrison	5
(Germany) Oliver Ortmann	9
(United States) Allen Hopkins	3
(Philippines) Antonio Lining	9
(Japan) Hishashi Yamamoto	8
(Chinese Taipei) Lai Chia-hsiung	9
(Germany) Michael Schmidt	8
(United States) Johnny Archer	9
(Italy) Fabio Petroni	6
(Germany) Ralph Eckert	9
(United States) Kim Davenport	8
(Germany) Thorsten Hohmann	9
(Philippines) Alex Pagulayan	8
(Netherlands) Niels Feijen	9
(Australia) Quinten Hann	7
(Philippines) Efren Reyes	9
(Singapore) Tiong Boon Tan	3
(Finland) Mika Immonen	9
(United States) Corey Deuel	3
(Malta) Tony Drago	9
(Philippines) Francisco Bustamante	6
(England) Gary Ponting	9
(Poland) Radosław Babica	7
(England) Anthony Ginn	9
(Chinese Taipei) Chao Fong-pang	8
(Chinese Taipei) Chang Hao-ping	9
(Indonesia) Robby Suarly	6
(Canada) Alain Martel	9
(Republic of Ireland) Tommy Donlon	5
(England) Steve Davis	9
(England) Jimmy White	2
(England) Chris Melling	9
(Socialist Federal Republic of Yugoslavia) Sandor Tot	8
(Philippines) Leonardo Andam	9
(Australia) Johl Younger	5
(Japan) Satoshi Kawabata	9
(Mexico) Ernesto Domínguez	4
(United States) Charlie Williams	9
(England) Daryl Peach	7
(England) Lee Tucker	9
(Canada) John Horsfall	8

Round of 32
(Germany) Ralf Souquet	9
(Japan) Takashi Toda	8
(Chinese Taipei) Yang Ching-shun	9
(England) Kevin Smith	6
(Sweden) Marcus Chamat	9
(Czech Republic) Lukas Krenek	1
(United States) Earl Strickland	7
(Germany) Andreas Roschkowsky	9
(Switzerland) Dimitri Jungo	3
(Spain) David Alcaide	9
(United States) Jeremy Jones	9
(United States) Troy Frank	4
(Germany) Oliver Ortmann	8
(Philippines) Antonio Lining	9
(Chinese Taipei) Lai Chia-hsiung	9
(United States) Johnny Archer	4
(Germany) Ralph Eckert	9
(Germany) Thorsten Hohmann	8
(Netherlands) Niels Feijen	9
(Philippines) Efren Reyes	5
(Finland) Mika Immonen	9
(Malta) Tony Drago	1
(England) Gary Ponting	3
(England) Anthony Ginn	9
(Chinese Taipei) Chang Hao-ping	8
(Canada) Alain Martel	9
(England) Steve Davis	8
(England) Chris Melling	9
(Philippines) Leonardo Andam	9
(Japan) Satoshi Kawabata	6
(United States) Charlie Williams	9
(England) Lee Tucker	8

Last 16
(Germany) Ralf Souquet	11
(Chinese Taipei) Yang Ching-shun	3
(Sweden) Marcus Chamat	11
(Germany) Andreas Roschkowsky	9
(Spain) David Alcaide	9
(United States) Jeremy Jones	11
(Philippines) Antonio Lining	7
(Chinese Taipei) Lai Chia-hsiung	11
(Germany) Ralph Eckert	6
(Netherlands) Niels Feijen	11
(Finland) Mika Immonen	11
(England) Anthony Ginn	2
(Canada) Alain Martel	11
(England) Chris Melling	9
(Philippines) Leonardo Andam	11
(United States) Charlie Williams	9

Quarter final
(Germany) Ralf Souquet	11
(Sweden) Marcus Chamat	1
(United States) Jeremy Jones	3
(Chinese Taipei) Lai Chia-hsiung	11
(Netherlands) Niels Feijen	7
(Finland) Mika Immonen	11
(Canada) Alain Martel	11
(Philippines) Leonardo Andam	9

Semifinal
(Germany) Ralf Souquet	11
(Chinese Taipei) Lai Chia-hsiung	2
(Finland) Mika Immonen	11
(Canada) Alain Martel	7

Final
(Germany) Ralf Souquet	10
(Finland) Mika Immonen	17
