= 2000 WPA World Nine-ball Championship =

WPA World 9-Ball Championship 2000
Tournament information
- Sport: 9-ball
- Location: Cardiff, Wales
- Dates: July 1, 2000–July 9, 2000
- Tournament format: Round robin / Single Elimination
- Host(s): WPA World Nine-ball Championship, Matchroom Pool
- Participants: 96

Final positions
- Champion: (Chinese Taipei) Chao Fong-pang
- Runner-up: (Mexico) Ismael Páez

The 2000 WPA World Nine-ball Championship was the 11th edition of the WPA World Championship for 9-Ball Pool. It took place from July 1 to 7, 2000 in Cardiff, Wales.

Chao Fong-pang won the event, defeating Mexican Ismael Páez in the final, winning 17–6.

Efren Reyes and Nick Varner were the two defending champions going into the event, but both lost in the 1st Round.

== Format ==
The 96 participating players were divided into 16 groups, in which they competed in round robin mode against each other. The top four players in each group qualified for the final round played in the knockout system.

=== Prize money ===
The event's prize money stayed similar to that of the previous years, with winner Chao Fong-pang winning $65,000.

| Position | Prize |
|---|---|
| First Place (champion) | $65,000 |
| Second Place (runner-up) | $30,000 |
| Third Place (semi-finalist | $17,500 |
| Fifth place (quarter finalist) | $8,500 |
| Ninth place (loser in round of 16) | $4,000 |
| Seventeenth place (loser in round of 32) | $2,000 |
| Thirty Third (loser in round of 64) | $1,500 |
| Sixty Fifth place (Fifth or sixth in round robin group) | $1,000 |
| Eighty First place (Seventh place in round robin group) | $500 |

== Preliminary round ==
The following 16 players finished fifth in their group.

- (Germany) Daniel Dutz
- (Wales) Darren Morgan
- (Poland) Rawel Rogalski
- (England) Jimmy White
- (England) Lee Tucker
- (England) Raj Hundal
- (South Korea) Hyung Han-jin
- (France) Eric Robaine
- (Sweden) Paul Hultgren
- (Denmark) Kasper Thygesen
- (Singapore) William Ang Boon Lay
- (Canada) Gerry Watson
- (Japan) Hisashi Yamamoto
- (Canada) Paul Potier
- (United States) James Rempe
- (Netherlands) Alex Lely

The following 16 players finished sixth in their group.

- (Venezuela) José Luis Perez
- (Chinese Taipei) Chen Wei-chih
- (New Zealand) Jimmy Henry
- (Mexico) José Castro
- (Australia) Lou Condo
- (Germany) Christian Reimering
- (Germany) Harald Stolka
- (Malta) Tony Drago
- (South Korea) Lee Jang-su
- (Australia) Leon Hogg
- (Venezuela) Luis Miguel Sánchez
- (Argentina) José Chiappetta
- (New Zealand) Grant Hayward
- (New Zealand) Neil Patterson
- (Colombia) Robinson Morales
- (Netherlands Antilles) Michael Arvelo

== Final round ==
Round of 64
(United States) Kim Davenport | 9
(Australia) Louis Condo | 1
(United States) Corey Deuel | 9
(Norway) Vegar Kristiansen | 6
(United States) Jon Kucharo | 9
(Mexico) Ernesto Domínguez | 4
(England) Chris Melling | 9
(Italy) Fabio Petroni | 2
(England) Steve Davis | 9
(Philippines) Efren Reyes | 8
(Germany) Ralf Souquet | 9
(Chinese Taipei) Hsia Hui-kai | 4
(England) Steve Knight | 9
(Sweden) Niklas Bergendorff | 2
(Japan) Kunihiko Takahashi | 9
(Singapore) Tiong Boon Tan | 2
(Russia) Evgeny Stalev | 9
(Germany) Michael Schmidt | 7
(Finland) Mika Immonen | 9
(Australia) Quinten Hann | 8
(Australia) Johl Younger | 9
(Wales) Dominic Dale | 6
(South Korea) Jeong Young-hwa | 9
(Sweden) Marcus Chamat | 6
(Poland) Radosław Babica | 9
(United States) Shannon Daulton | 8
(Chinese Taipei) Chao Fong-pang | 9
(Germany) Ralph Eckert | 8
(Netherlands) Niels Feijen | 9
(Philippines) Francisco Bustamante | 6
(Germany) Oliver Ortmann | 9
(Russia) Maxim Stalew | 3
(Japan) Takeshi Okumura | 9
(Chinese Taipei) Wang Hua-fong | 4
(Philippines) Rodolfo Luat | 9
(United States) Michael Coltrain | 6
(Chinese Taipei) Yang Ching-shun | 9
(United States) Tang Hoa | 2
(Philippines) Leonardo Andam | 9
(Germany) Thomas Engert | 3
(Japan) Akikumo Toshikawa | 9
(England) Daryl Peach | 5
(United States) Johnny Archer | 9
(England) Adam Lewis | 6
(England) Kevin Smith | 9
(United States) Nick Varner | 7
(United States) Earl Strickland | 9
(Belgium) Mario Lannoye | 3
(Mexico) Ismael Páez | 9
(Canada) Luc Salvas | 5
(Chinese Taipei) Chang Hao-ping | 9
(England) Darren Appleton | 4
(Canada) Alain Martel | 9
(Wales) Rob McKenna | 2
(Canada) Alex Pagulayan | 9
(Canada) Edwin Montal | 3
(United States) Allen Hopkins | 9
(Chinese Taipei) Kuo Po-cheng | 4
(United States) David Matlock | 9
(Japan) Takashi Toda | 5
(South Korea) Park Shin-young | 9
(Philippines) Warren Kiamco | 5
(Denmark) Peter Nielsen | 9
(United States) Jeremy Jones | 4

Round of 32
(United States) Kim Davenport | 4
(United States) Corey Deuel | 9
(United States) Jon Kucharo | 9
(England) Chris Melling | 5
(England) Steve Davis | 9
(Germany) Ralf Souquet | 6
(England) Steve Knight | 0
(Japan) Kunihiko Takahashi | 9
(Russia) Evgeny Stalev | 6
(Finland) Mika Immonen | 9
(Australia) Johl Younger | 9
(South Korea) Jeong Young-hwa | 6
(Poland) Radosław Babica | 7
(Chinese Taipei) Chao Fong-pang | 9
(Netherlands) Niels Feijen | 6
(Germany) Oliver Ortmann | 9
(Japan) Takeshi Okumura | 5
(Philippines) Rodolfo Luat | 9
(Chinese Taipei) Yang Ching-shun | 9
(Philippines) Leonardo Andam | 8
(Japan) Akikumo Toshikawa | 9
(United States) Johnny Archer | 5
(England) Kevin Smith | 7
(United States) Earl Strickland | 9
(Mexico) Ismael Páez | 9
(Chinese Taipei) Chang Hao-ping | 7
(Canada) Alain Martel | 4
(Canada) Alex Pagulayan | 9
(United States) Allen Hopkins | 9
(United States) David Matlock | 7
(South Korea) Park Shin-young | 6
(Denmark) Peter Nielsen | 9

Round of 16
(United States) Corey Deuel | 11
(United States) Jon Kucharo | 10
(England) Steve Davis | 11
(Japan) Kunihiko Takahashi | 6
(Finland) Mika Immonen | 7
(Australia) Johl Younger | 11
(Chinese Taipei) Chao Fong-pang | 11
(Germany) Oliver Ortmann | 9
(Philippines) Rodolfo Luat | 11
(Chinese Taipei) Yang Ching-shun | 6
(Japan) Akikumo Toshikawa | 4
(United States) Earl Strickland | 11
(Mexico) Ismael Páez | 11
(Canada) Alex Pagulayan | 8
(United States) Allen Hopkins | 8
(Denmark) Peter Nielsen | 11

Quarter final
(United States) Corey Deuel | 11
(England) Steve Davis | 7
(Australia) Johl Younger | 1
(Chinese Taipei) Chao Fong-pang | 11
(Philippines) Rodolfo Luat | 9
(United States) Earl Strickland | 11
(Mexico) Ismael Páez | 11
(Denmark) Peter Nielsen | 9

Semifinal
(United States) Corey Deuel | 9
(Chinese Taipei) Chao Fong-pang | 11
(United States) Earl Strickland | 9
(Mexico) Ismael Páez | 11

Final
(Chinese Taipei) Chao Fong-pang | 17
(Mexico) Ismael Páez | 6
