= 2015 World Pool Masters =

World Pool Masters XXIII
Tournament information
- Dates: 14–16 August 2015
- Venue: Victoria Warehouse
- City: Manchester
- Country: England
- Organisation: Matchroom Sport
- Format: Invitational event
- Total prize fund: $70,000
- Winner's share: $20,000

Final
- Champion: (United States) Shane Van Boening
- Runner-up: (England) Darren Appleton
- Score: 8–2

The 2015 World Pool Masters, also known as World Pool Masters XXIII, was a nine-ball pool tournament that took place in Manchester, England, between 14 and 16 August 2015. It was the 23rd edition of the invitational tournament organised by Matchroom Sport.

The event was won by Shane Van Boening, who defeated Darren Appleton in the final 8–2, to win his second Pool Masters title. This was Van Boening's second straight championship, having won the title before in 2014.

== Event prize money ==
	Prize money
Winner	20.000 US$
Runner-up	9.000 US$
Semi-finalist	4.500 US$
Quarter-finalist	3.000 US$
Last 16	2.500 US$
Total	70.000 US$

== Tournament bracket ==
Round 1; 14–15 August
1	(United States) Shane Van Boening	8
(Canada) John Morra	6
8	(Qatar) Waleed Majid	8
(Scotland) Jayson Shaw	4
4	(Netherlands) Niels Feijen	8
(Sweden) Marcus Chamat	6
5	(China) Liu Haitao	8
(England) Karl Boyes	7
3	(England) Darren Appleton	8
(Poland) Mateusz Śniegocki	4
6	(United States) Johnny Archer	8
(Australia) James Georgiadis	2
7	(Greece) Nikos Ekonomopoulos	2
(Germany) Ralf Souquet	8
2	(Chinese Taipei) Ko Pin-yi	5
(England) Mark Gray	8

Quarter-final; 15–16 August
1	(United States) Shane Van Boening	8
8	(Qatar) Waleed Majid	5
4	(Netherlands) Niels Feijen	6
5	(China) Liu Haitao	8
3	(England) Darren Appleton	8
6	(United States) Johnny Archer	5
(Germany) Ralf Souquet	6
(England) Mark Gray	8

Semi-final; 16 August
1	(United States) Shane Van Boening	8
5	(China) Liu Haitao	0
3	(England) Darren Appleton	8
(England) Mark Gray	4

Final; 16 August
1	(United States) Shane Van Boening	8
3	(England) Darren Appleton	2
