= 2000 Mosconi Cup =

Nine-ball pool competition

- Dates: 14–17 December
- Venue: York Hall
- Location: Bethnal Green, London, England
- 9 – 12 United States wins the Mosconi Cup

The 2000 Acclaim Mosconi Cup, the seventh edition of the annual nine-ball pool competition between teams representing Europe and the United States, took place 14–17 December 2000 at the York Hall in Bethnal Green, London, England.

Team USA won the Mosconi Cup by defeating Team Europe 12–9.

== Teams ==
Team USA
Name	State of birth	Notes
Johnny Archer	Georgia
Shannon Daulton	Kentucky
Jeremy Jones	Texas
Corey Deuel	California
Earl Strickland	North Carolina
Michael Coltrain	North Carolina

Team Europe
Name	Nationality	Notes
Steve Knight	United Kingdom
Mika Immonen	Finland
Ralf Souquet	Germany
Thomas Engert	Germany
Marcus Chamat	Sweden
Steve Davis	United Kingdom

== Results ==
=== Thursday, 14 December ===
==== Session 1 ====
	Results
Doubles; Mika Immonen; Marcus Chamat	1–5	Doubles; Johnny Archer; Shannon Daulton
Doubles; Ralf Souquet; Thomas Engert	5–1	Doubles; Jeremy Jones; Michael Coltrain
Doubles; Steve Davis; Steve Knight	2–5	Doubles; Earl Strickland; Corey Deuel
1	Session	2
1	Overall	2

=== Friday, 15 December ===
==== Session 2 ====
	Results
Doubles; Steve Knight; Marcus Chamat	0–5	Doubles; Johnny Archer; Shannon Daulton
Doubles; Steve Davis; Mika Immonen	5–2	Doubles; Earl Strickland; Corey Deuel
Doubles; Ralf Souquet; Thomas Engert	5–2	Doubles; Jeremy Jones; Michael Coltrain
2	Session	1
3	Overall	3

==== Session 3 ====
	Results
Singles; Marcus Chamat	3–5	Singles; Michael Coltrain
Singles; Mika Immonen	3–5	Singles; Johnny Archer
Singles; Steve Davis	5–4	Singles; Jeremy Jones
1	Session	2
4	Overall	5

=== Saturday, 16 December ===
==== Session 4 ====
	Results
Doubles; Steve Knight; Marcus Chamat	5–1	Doubles; Johnny Archer; Shannon Daulton
Doubles; Ralf Souquet; Thomas Engert	4–5	Doubles; Corey Deuel; Michael Coltrain
Doubles; Steve Davis; Mika Immonen	1–5	Doubles; Earl Strickland; Jeremy Jones
1	Session	2
5	Overall	7

==== Session 5 ====
	Results
Singles; Thomas Engert	3–5	Singles; Corey Deuel
Singles; Steve Knight	5–1	Singles; Shannon Daulton
Singles; Ralf Souquet	1–5	Singles; Earl Strickland
1	Session	2
6	Overall	9

=== Sunday, 17 December ===
==== Session 6 ====
	Results
Singles; Steve Knight	1–5	Singles; Corey Deuel
Singles; Mika Immonen	5–4	Singles; Johnny Archer
Singles; Steve Davis	5–0	Singles; Michael Coltrain
2	Session	1
8	Overall	10

==== Session 7 ====
	Results
Singles; Ralf Souquet	3–5	Singles; Shannon Daulton
Singles; Marcus Chamat	5–3	Singles; Jeremy Jones
Singles; Thomas Engert	2–5	Singles; Earl Strickland
1	Session	2
9	Overall	12
