= 1999 Mosconi Cup =

- Dates: 16–19 December
- Venue: York Hall
- Location: Bethnal Green, London, England
- 7 – 12 United States wins the Mosconi Cup

The 1999 Acclaim Mosconi Cup, the sixth edition of the annual nine-ball pool competition between teams representing Europe and the United States, took place 16–19 December 1999 at the York Hall in Bethnal Green, London, England.

Team USA won the Mosconi Cup by defeating Team Europe 12–7.

== Teams ==
Team USA
Name	State of birth	Notes
Johnny Archer	Georgia
Kim Davenport	Oklahoma
Jeremy Jones	Texas
Jim Rempe	Pennsylvania
Earl Strickland	North Carolina
Michael Coltrain	North Carolina

Team Europe
Name	Nationality	Notes
Steve Knight	United Kingdom
Mika Immonen	Finland
Ralf Souquet	Germany
Alex Lely	Netherlands
Oliver Ortmann	Germany
Steve Davis	United Kingdom

== Results ==
=== Thursday, 16 December ===
==== Session 1 ====
	Results
Doubles; Mika Immonen; Ralf Souquet	2–5	Doubles; Johnny Archer; Kim Davenport
Doubles; Oliver Ortmann; Alex Lely	2–5	Doubles; Earl Strickland; Jim Rempe
Doubles; Steve Davis; Steve Knight	4–5	Doubles; Jeremy Jones; Michael Coltrain
0	Session	3
0	Overall	3

=== Friday, 17 December ===
==== Session 2 ====
	Results
Doubles; Ralf Souquet; Oliver Ortmann	5–3	Doubles; Johnny Archer; Kim Davenport
Doubles; Steve Knight; Mika Immonen	5–2	Doubles; Earl Strickland; Jim Rempe
Doubles; Steve Davis; Alex Lely	5–3	Doubles; Jeremy Jones; Michael Coltrain
3	Session	0
3	Overall	3

==== Session 3 ====
	Results
Singles; Alex Lely	4–5	Singles; Kim Davenport
Singles; Ralf Souquet	5–2	Singles; Earl Strickland
Singles; Steve Davis	4–5	Singles; Jeremy Jones
1	Session	2
4	Overall	5

=== Saturday, 18 December ===
==== Session 4 ====
	Results
Doubles; Ralf Souquet; Oliver Ortmann	2–5	Doubles; Jim Rempe; Kim Davenport
Doubles; Steve Knight; Mika Immonen	3–5	Doubles; Jeremy Jones; Michael Coltrain
Doubles; Steve Davis; Alex Lely	3–5	Doubles; Earl Strickland; Johnny Archer
0	Session	3
4	Overall	8

==== Session 5 ====
	Results
Singles; Mika Immonen	5–3	Singles; Jim Rempe
Singles; Steve Knight	5–3	Singles; Michael Coltrain
Singles; Oliver Ortmann	1–5	Singles; Johnny Archer
2	Session	1
6	Overall	9

=== Sunday, 19 December ===
==== Session 6 ====
	Results
Singles; Mika Immonen	2–5	Singles; Jeremy Jones
Singles; Steve Knight	5–4	Singles; Michael Coltrain
Singles; Ralf Souquet	2–5	Singles; Kim Davenport
1	Session	2
7	Overall	11

==== Session 7 ====
	Results
Singles; Steve Davis	2–5	Singles; Johnny Archer
0	Session	1
7	Overall	12
