= 2008 Mosconi Cup =

- Dates: 11–14 December
- Venue: Hilton Conference Center
- Location: Portomaso, Malta
- Captains: Alex Lely (EU); Nick Varner (US)
- MVP: Mika Immonen (EU)
- 11 – 5 Europe wins the Mosconi Cup

The 2008 Mosconi Cup, the 15th edition of the annual nine-ball pool competition between teams representing Europe and the United States, took place 11–14 December 2008 at the Hilton Conference Center in Portomaso, Malta.

Team Europe won the Mosconi Cup by defeating Team USA 11–5.

== The teams ==
Team USA
Name	State of birth	Notes
Earl Strickland	North Carolina
Johnny Archer	Georgia
Rodney Morris	California
Jeremy Jones	Texas
Shane Van Boening	South Dakota
Nick Varner	Kentucky	Non-playing captain

Team Europe
Name	Nationality	Notes
Ralf Souquet	Germany
Niels Feijen	Netherlands
Mika Immonen	Finland	Most Valuable Player
Tony Drago	Malta
Mark Gray	United Kingdom
Alex Lely	Netherlands	Non-playing captain

== Results ==
=== Thursday, 11 December ===
==== Session 1 ====
	Results
Teams; Team Europe	5–3	Teams; Team USA
Doubles; Niels Feijen; Ralf Souquet	5–3	Doubles; Shane Van Boening; Rodney Morris
Singles; Mika Immonen	5–1	Singles; Jeremy Jones
Doubles; Tony Drago; Mark Gray	3–5	Doubles; Earl Strickland; Johnny Archer
3	Session	1
3	Overall	1

=== Friday, 12 December ===
==== Session 2 ====
	Results
Doubles; Niels Feijen; Ralf Souquet	5–3	Doubles; Shane Van Boening; Rodney Morris
Singles; Tony Drago	4–5	Singles; Earl Strickland
Doubles; Mika Immonen; Mark Gray	1–5	Doubles; Johnny Archer; Jeremy Jones
Singles; Mika Immonen	5–0	Singles; Earl Strickland
2	Session	2
5	Overall	3

=== Saturday, 13 December ===
==== Session 3 ====
	Results
Doubles; Niels Feijen; Ralf Souquet	5–1	Doubles; Earl Strickland; Rodney Morris
Singles; Tony Drago	2–5	Singles; Shane Van Boening
Doubles; Mika Immonen; Mark Gray	5–4	Doubles; Johnny Archer; Jeremy Jones
2	Session	1
7	Overall	4

==== Session 4 ====
	Results
Singles; Niels Feijen	3–5	Singles; Rodney Morris
Singles; Ralf Souquet	5–2	Singles; Shane Van Boening
Singles; Mika Immonen	5–3	Singles; Jeremy Jones
2	Session	1
9	Overall	5

=== Sunday, 14 December ===
==== Session 5 ====
	Results
Doubles; Niels Feijen; Ralf Souquet	5–2	Doubles; Rodney Morris; Jeremy Jones
Singles; Mika Immonen	5–3	Singles; Shane Van Boening
2	Session	0
11	Overall	5

== Gallery ==
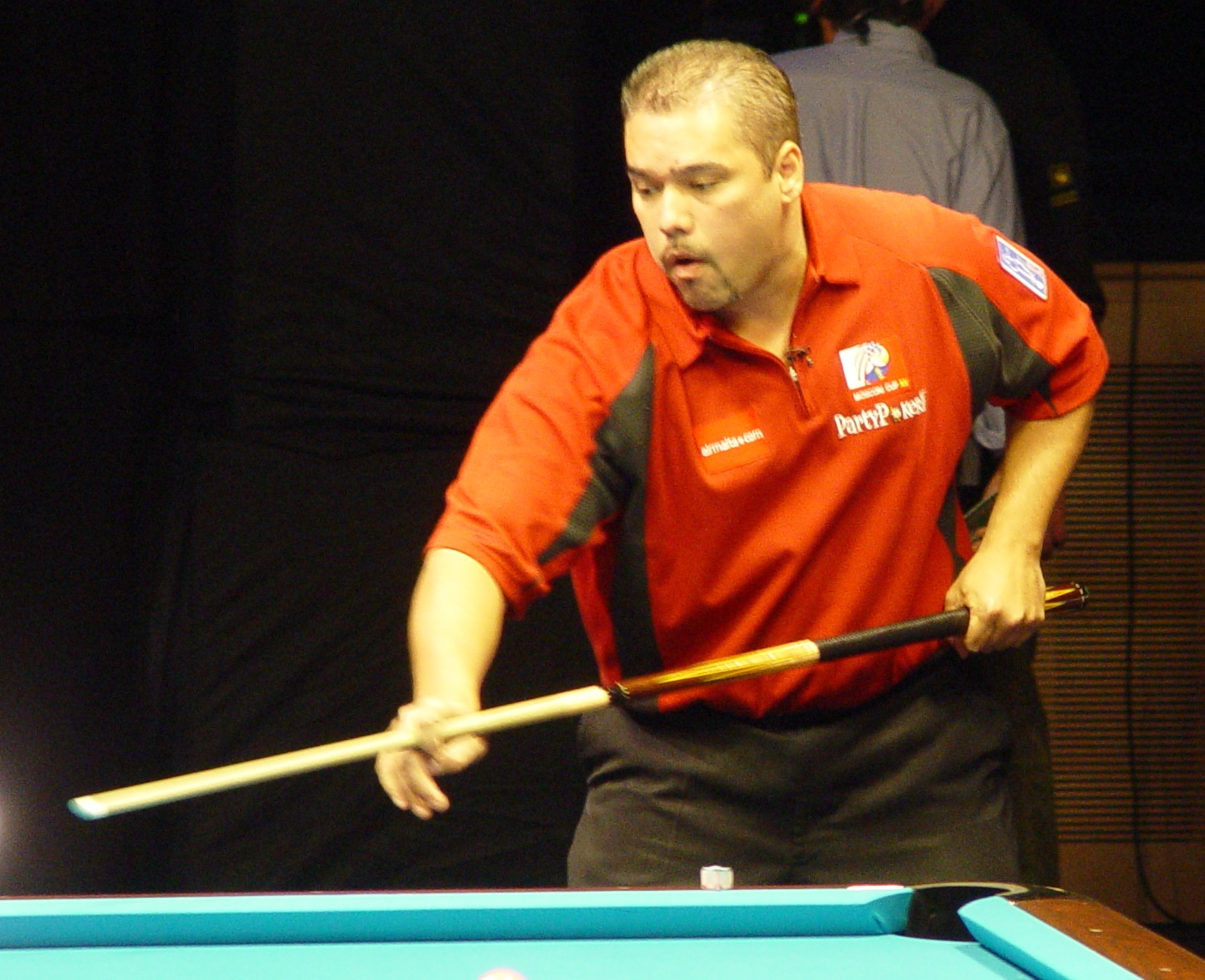
Rodney Morris

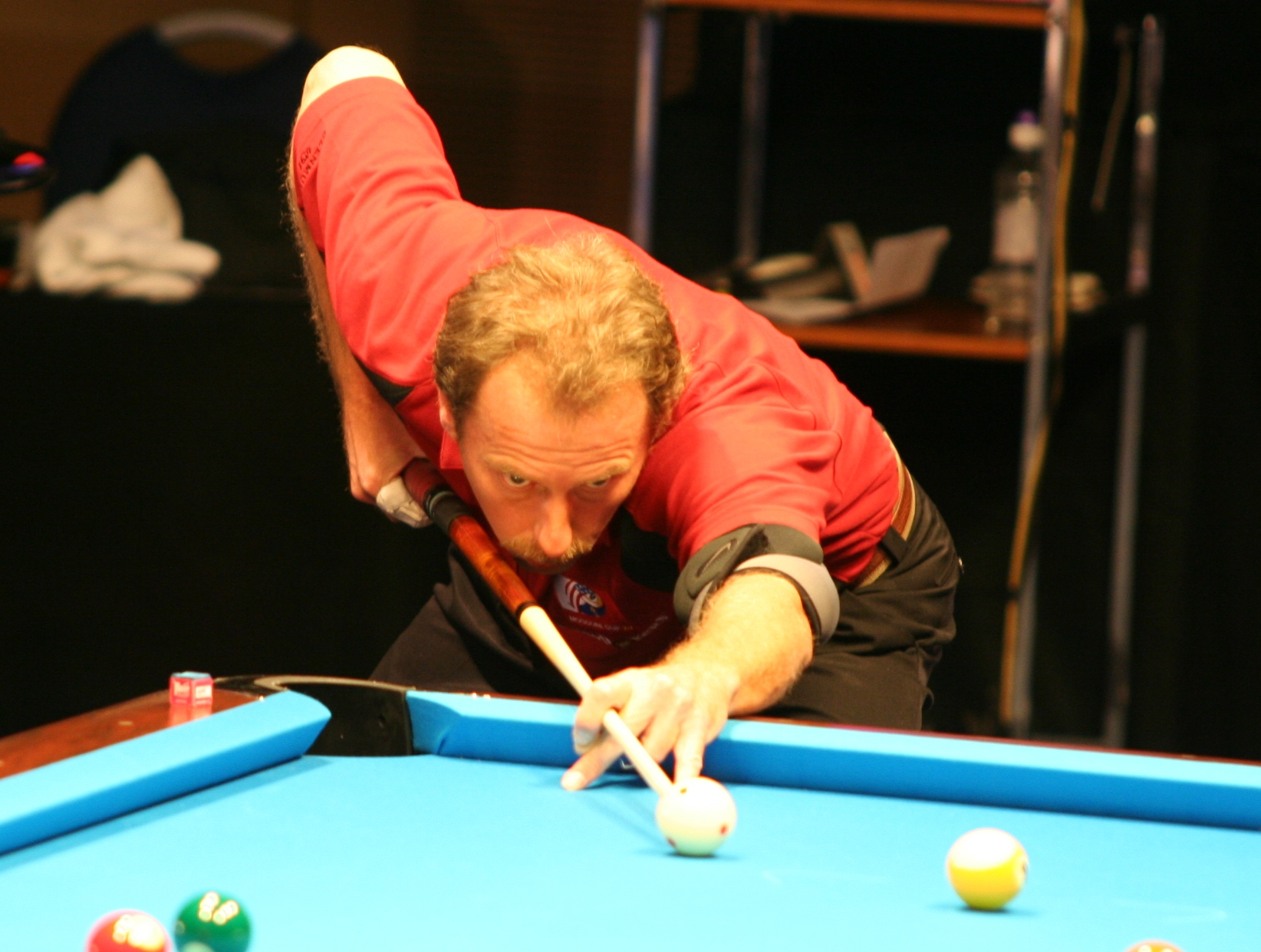
Earl Strickland

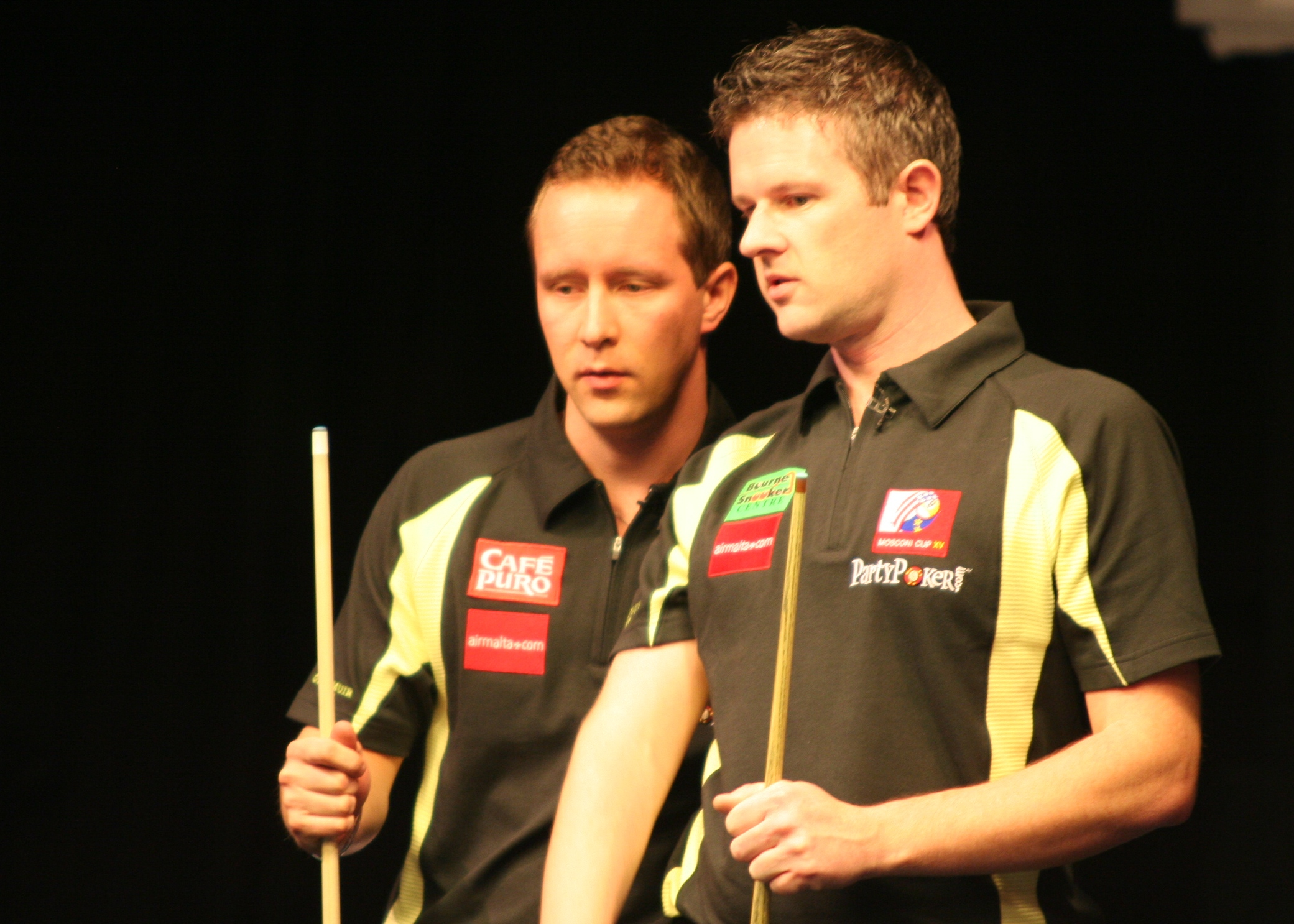
Mika Immonen and Mark Gray

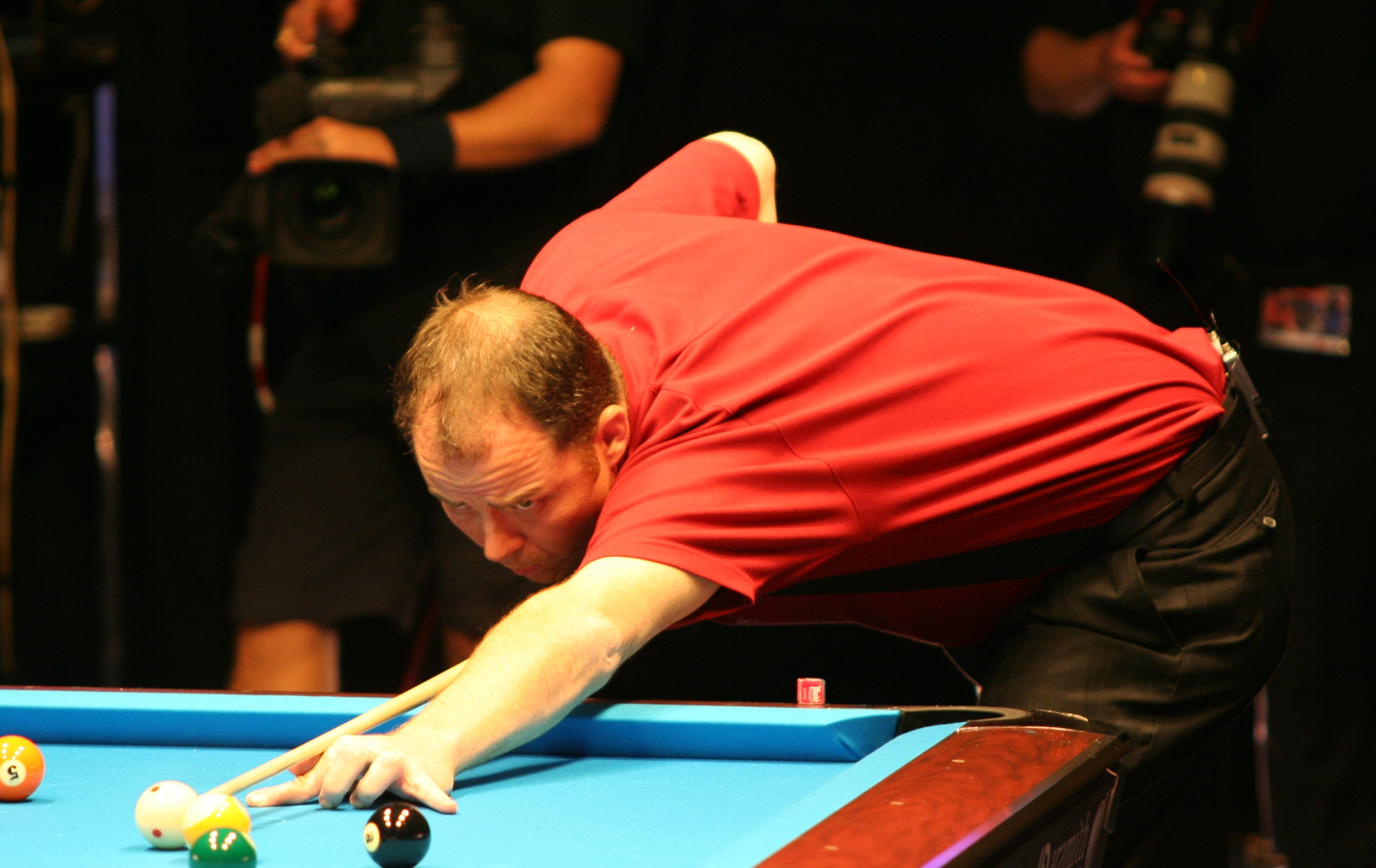
Jeremy Jones

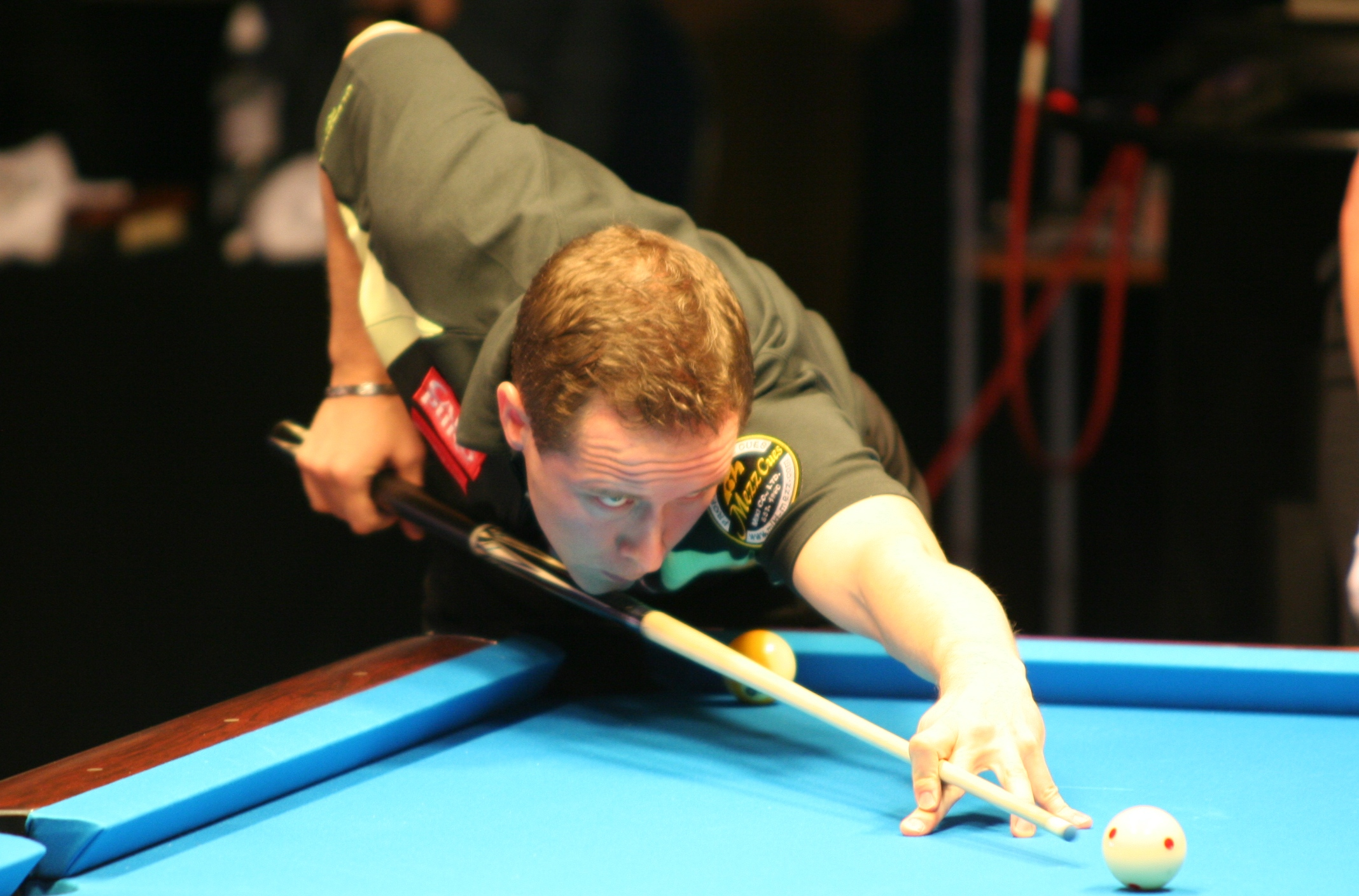
Mika Immonen

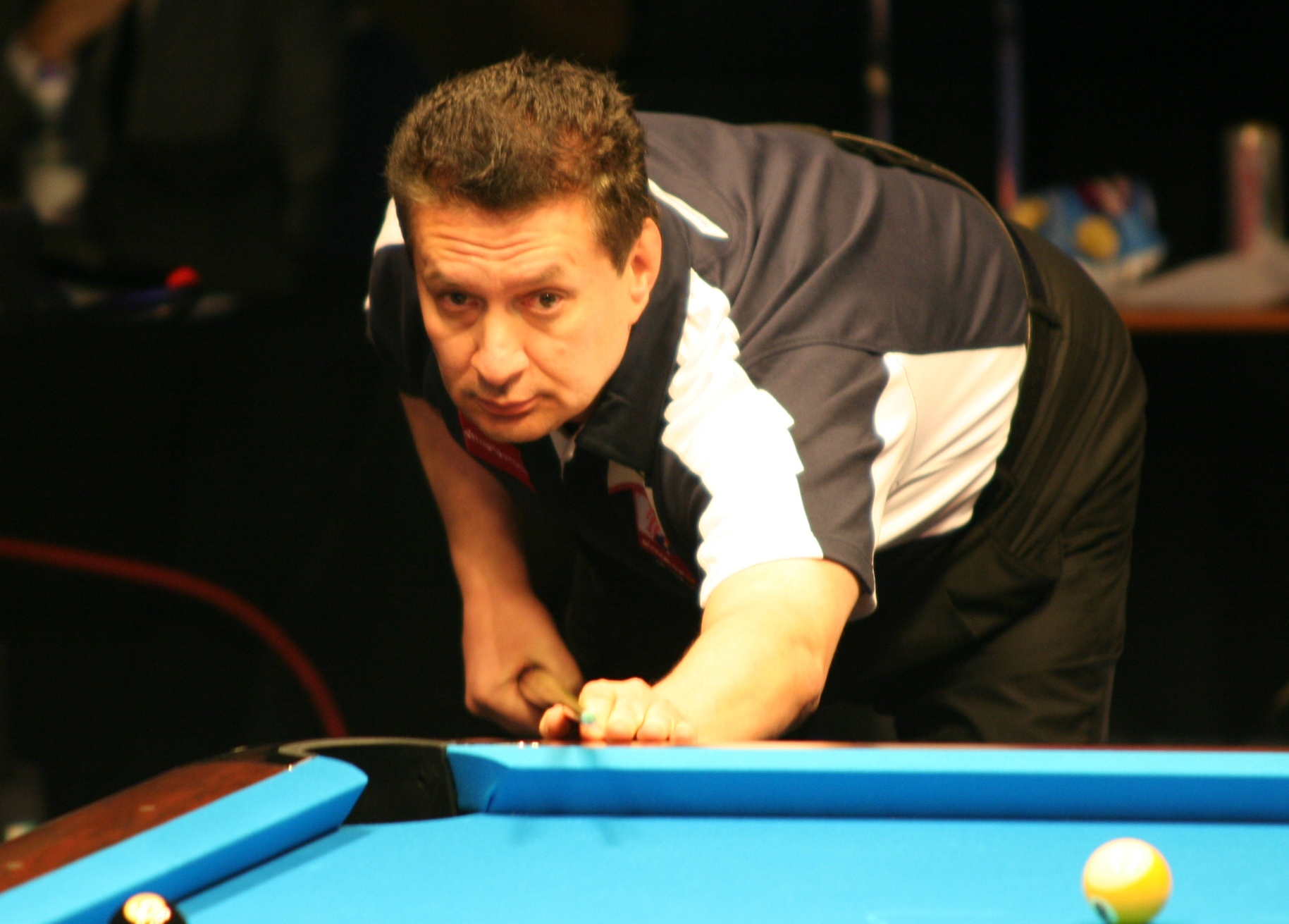
Tony Drago

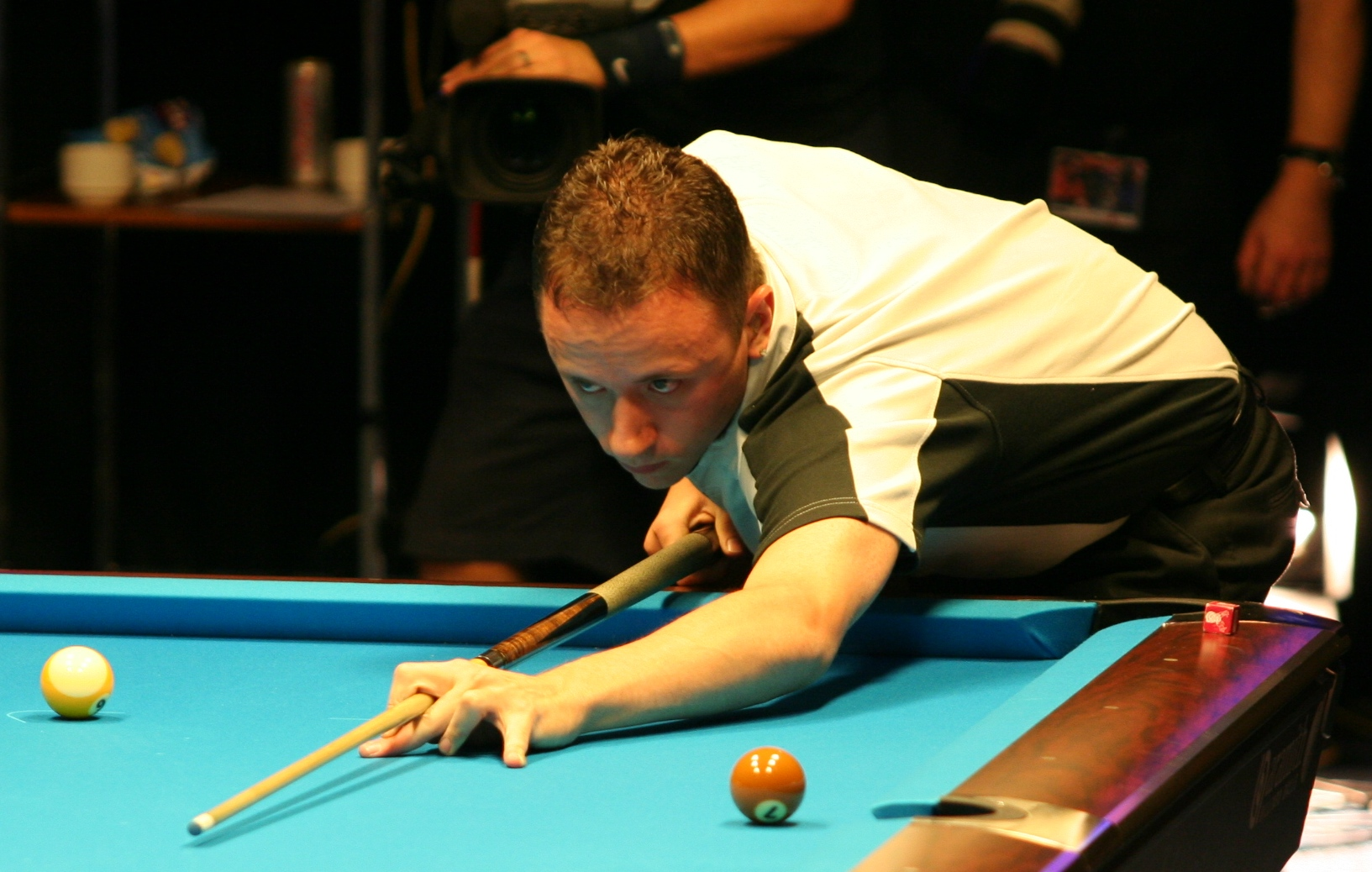
Shane van Boening

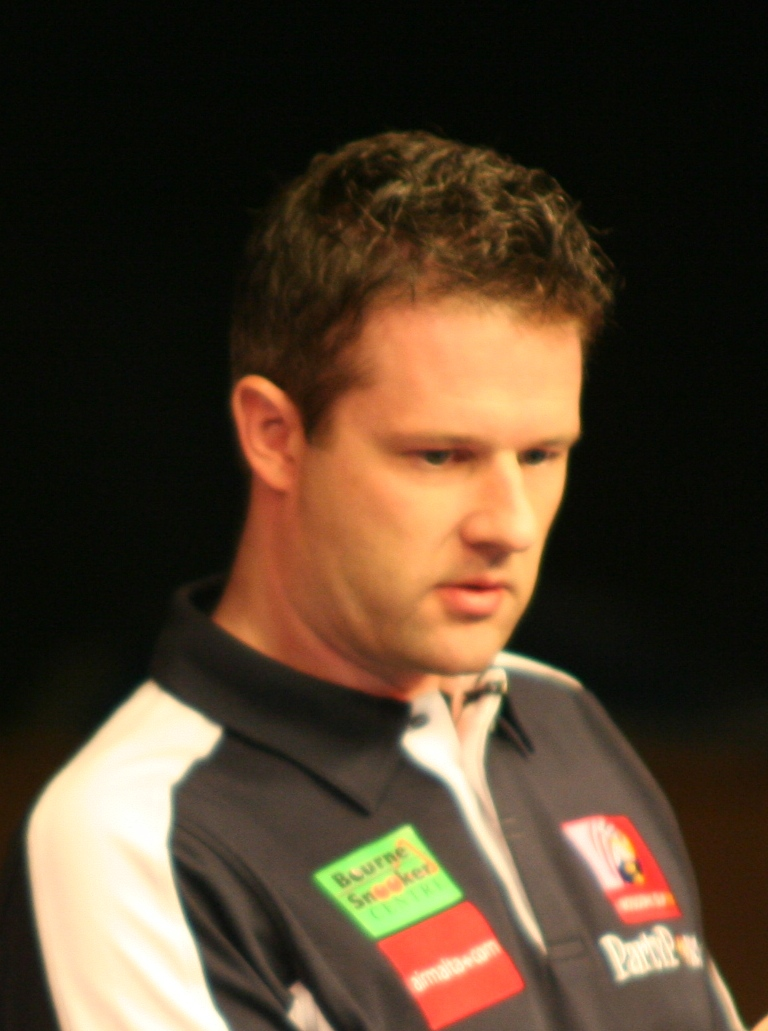
Mark Gray

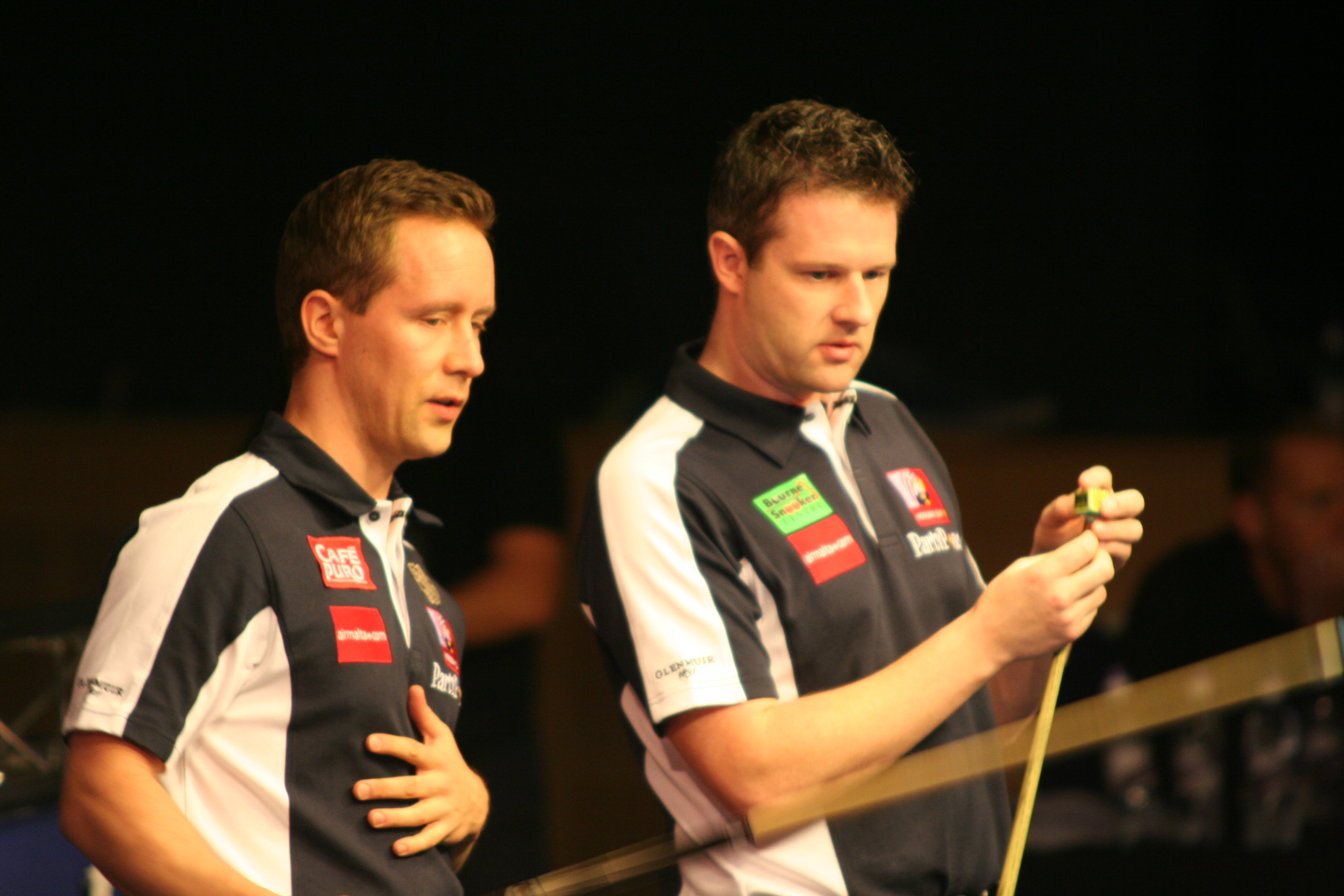
Mika Immonen and Mark Gray

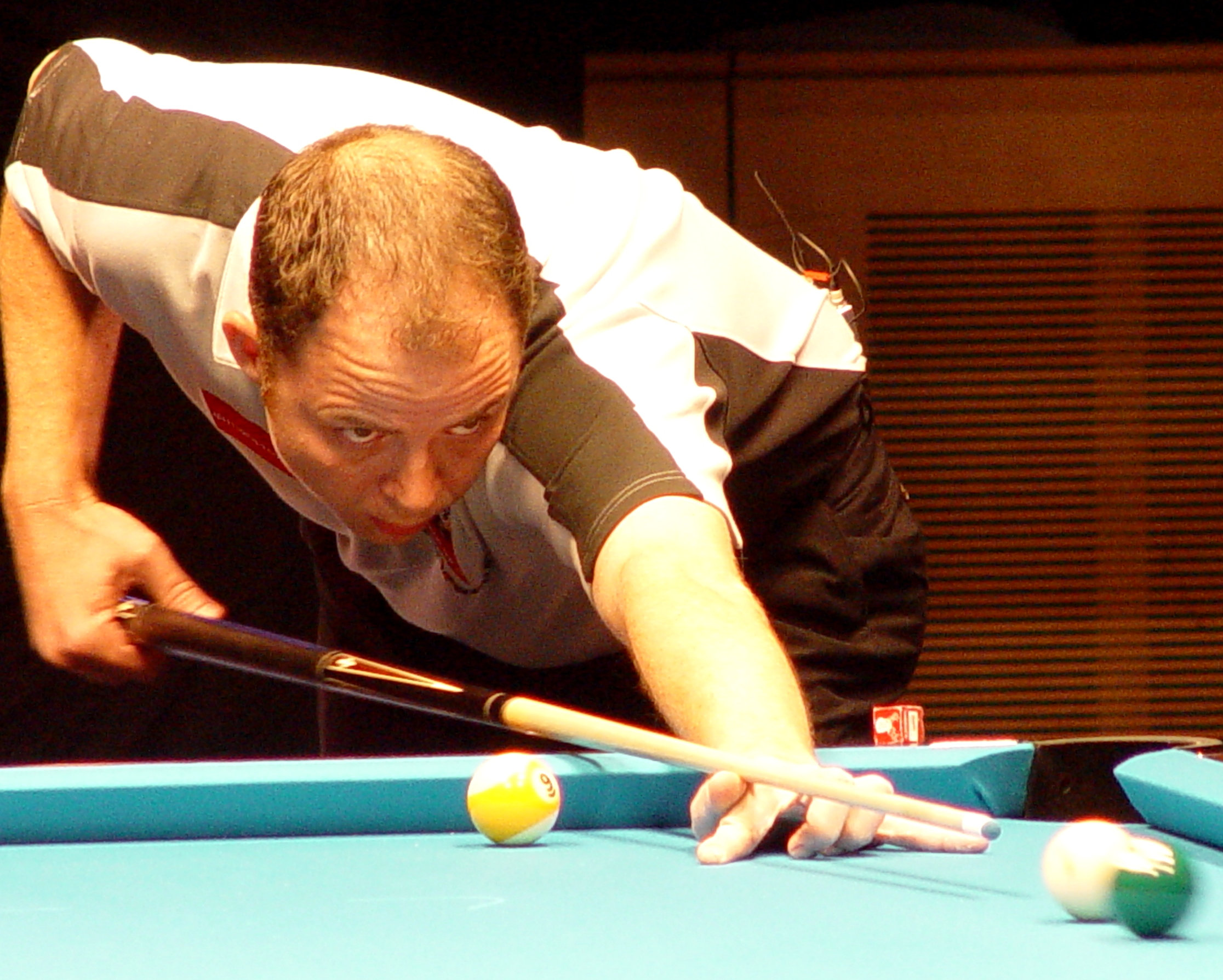
Jeremy Jones

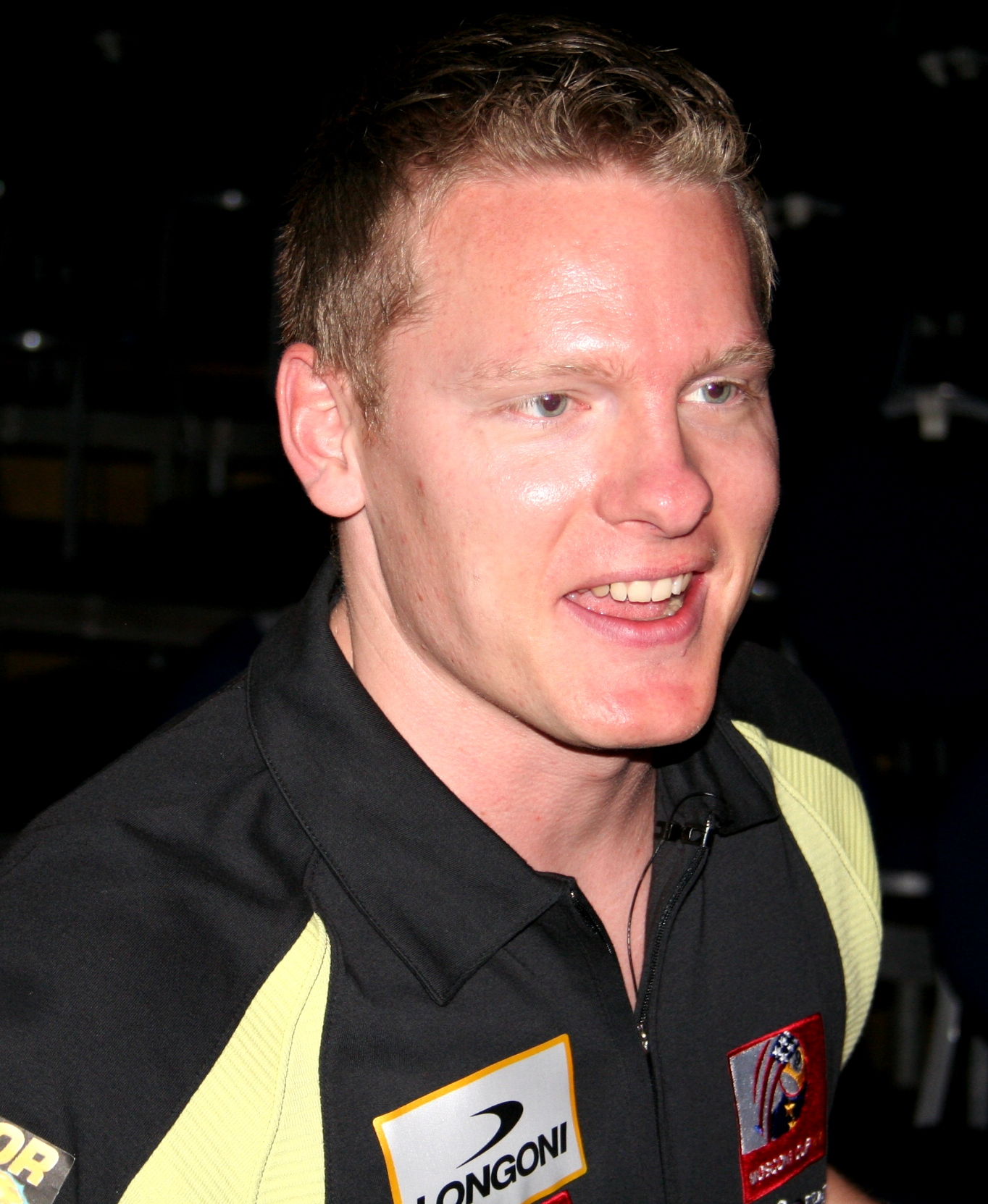
Niels Feijen

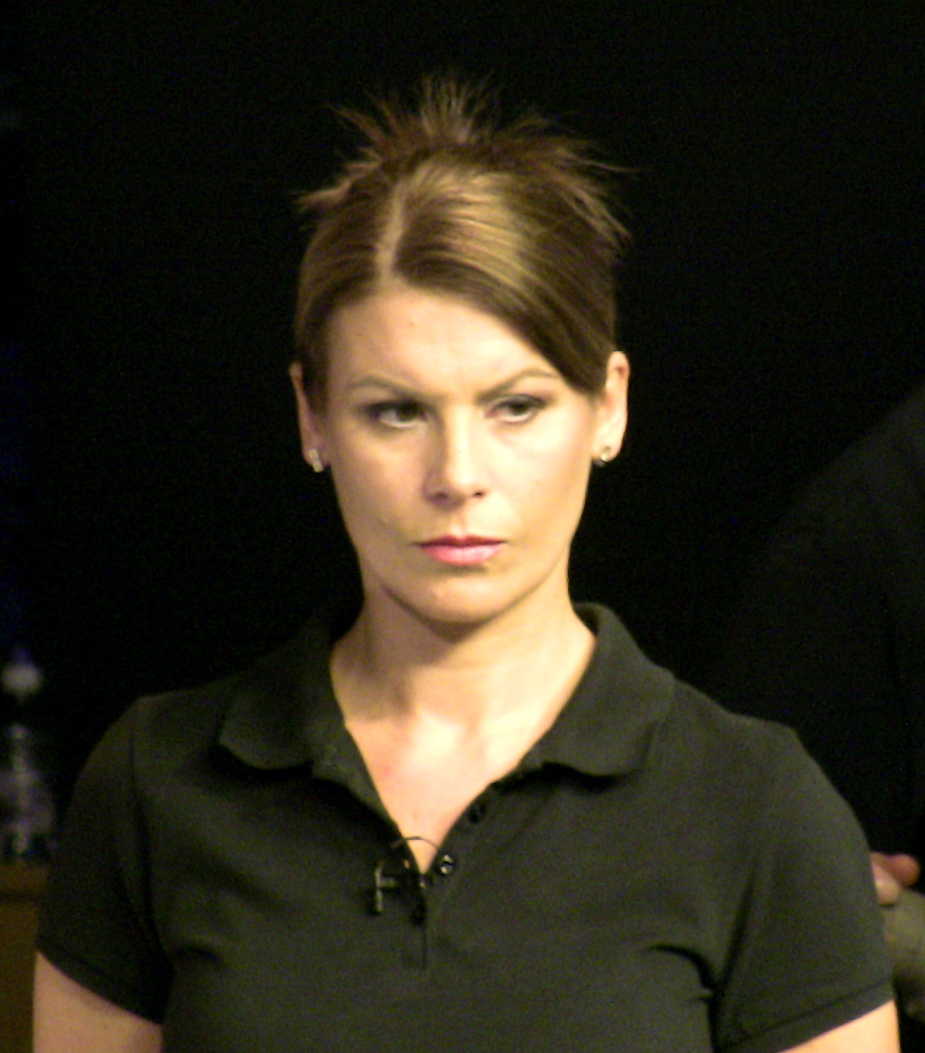
Michaela Tabb

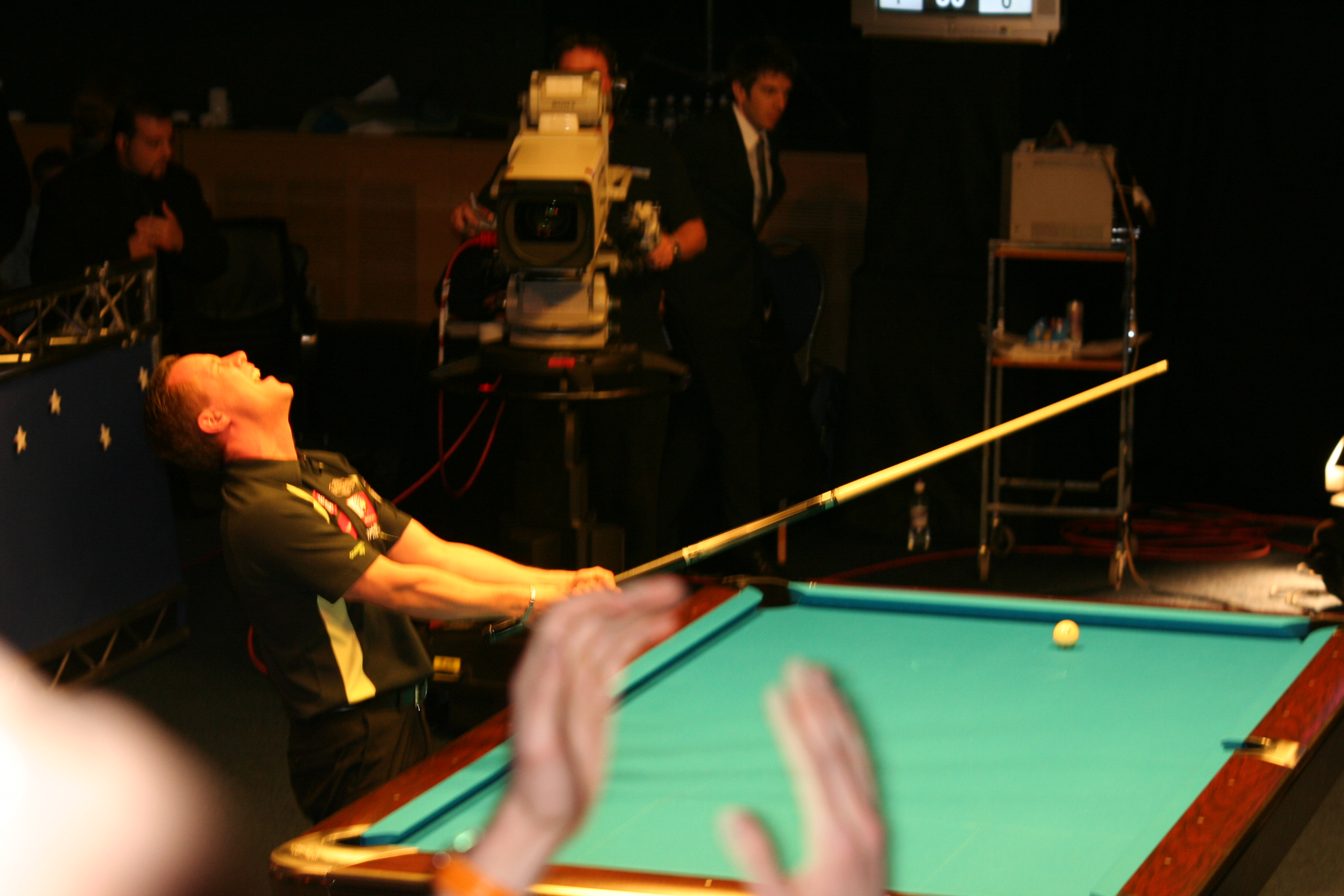
Mika Immonen after potting the final ball to win the Mosconi Cup

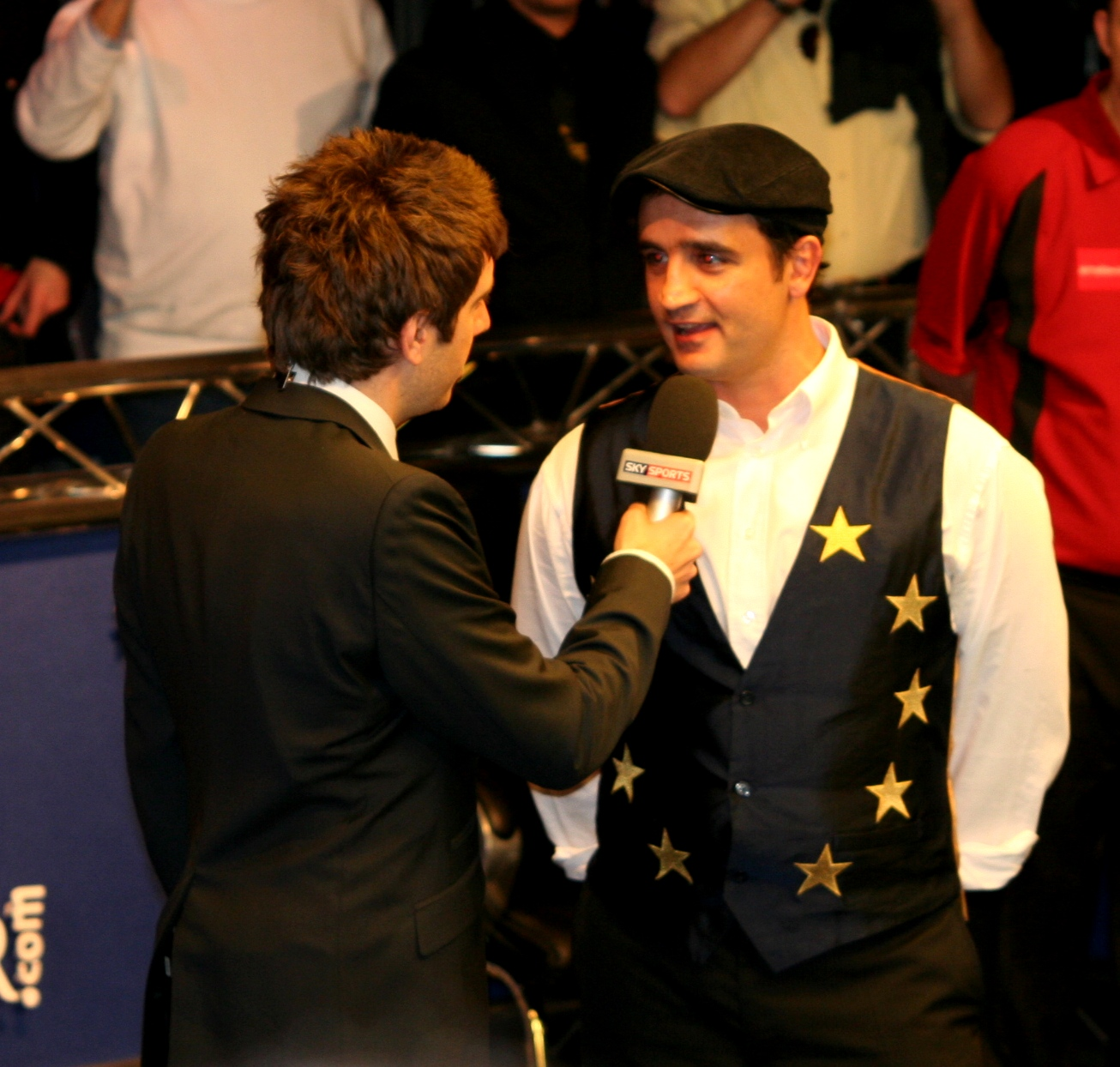
Interview with Alex Lely

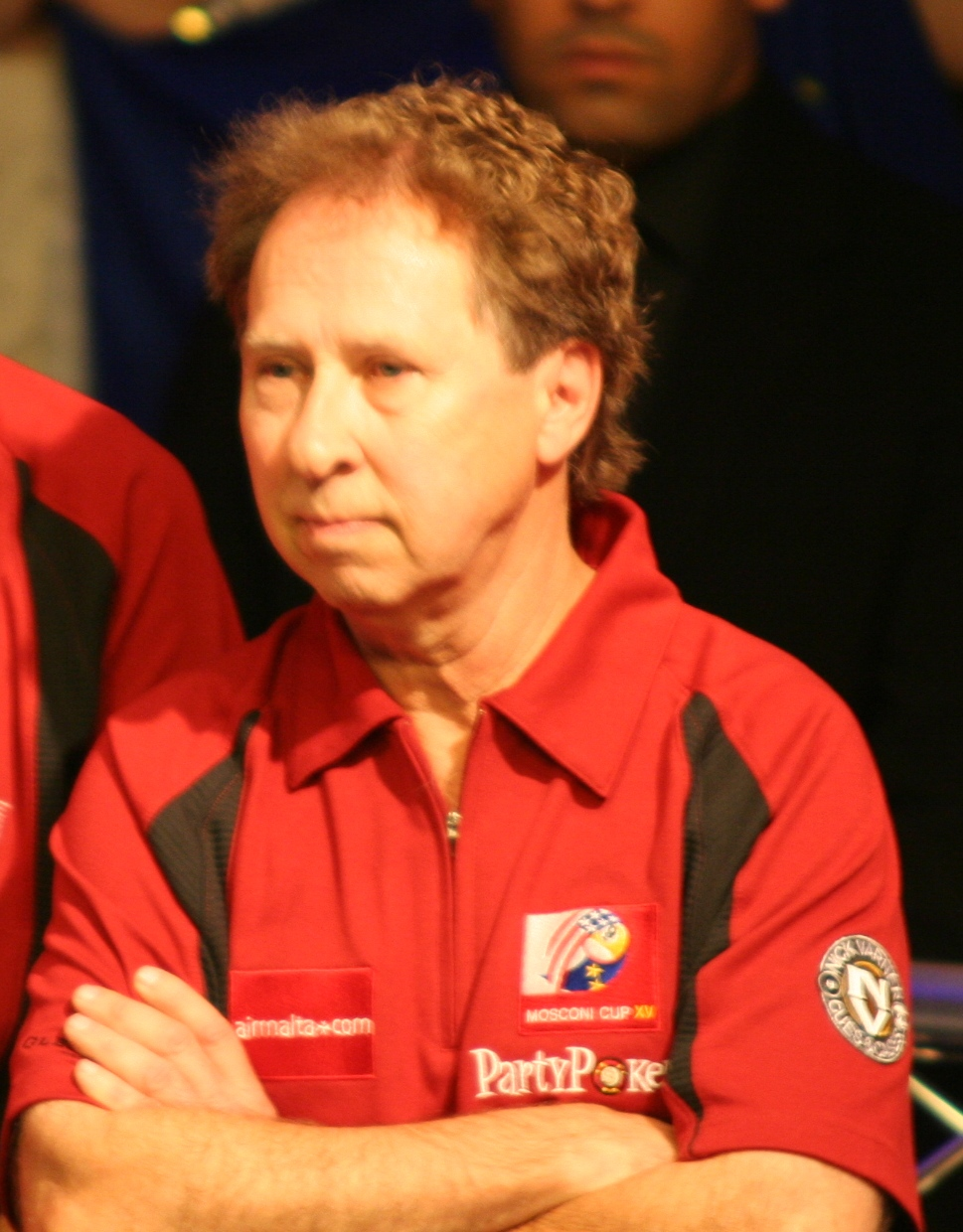
Nick Varner

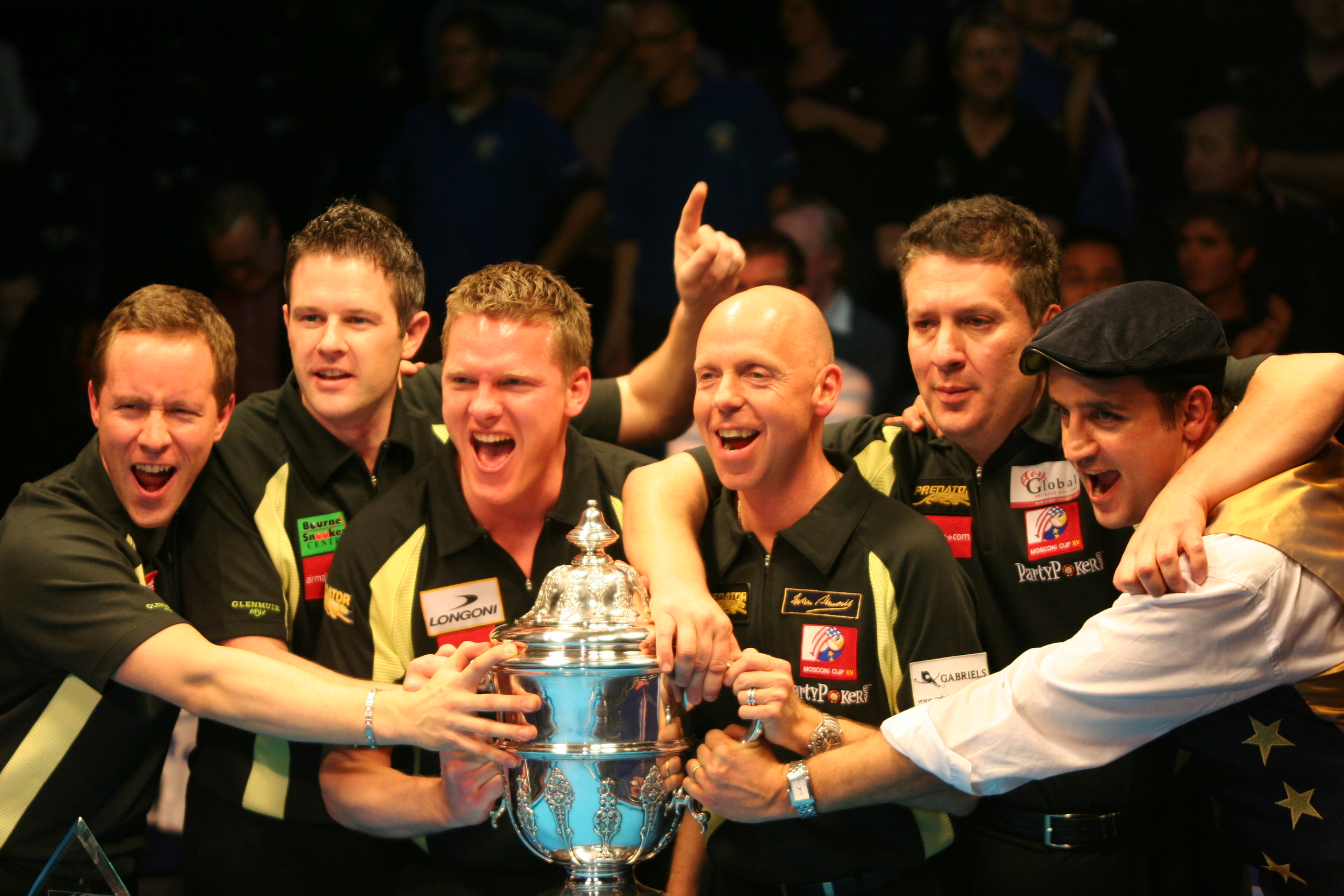
Members of the victorious Team Europe with the Cup.

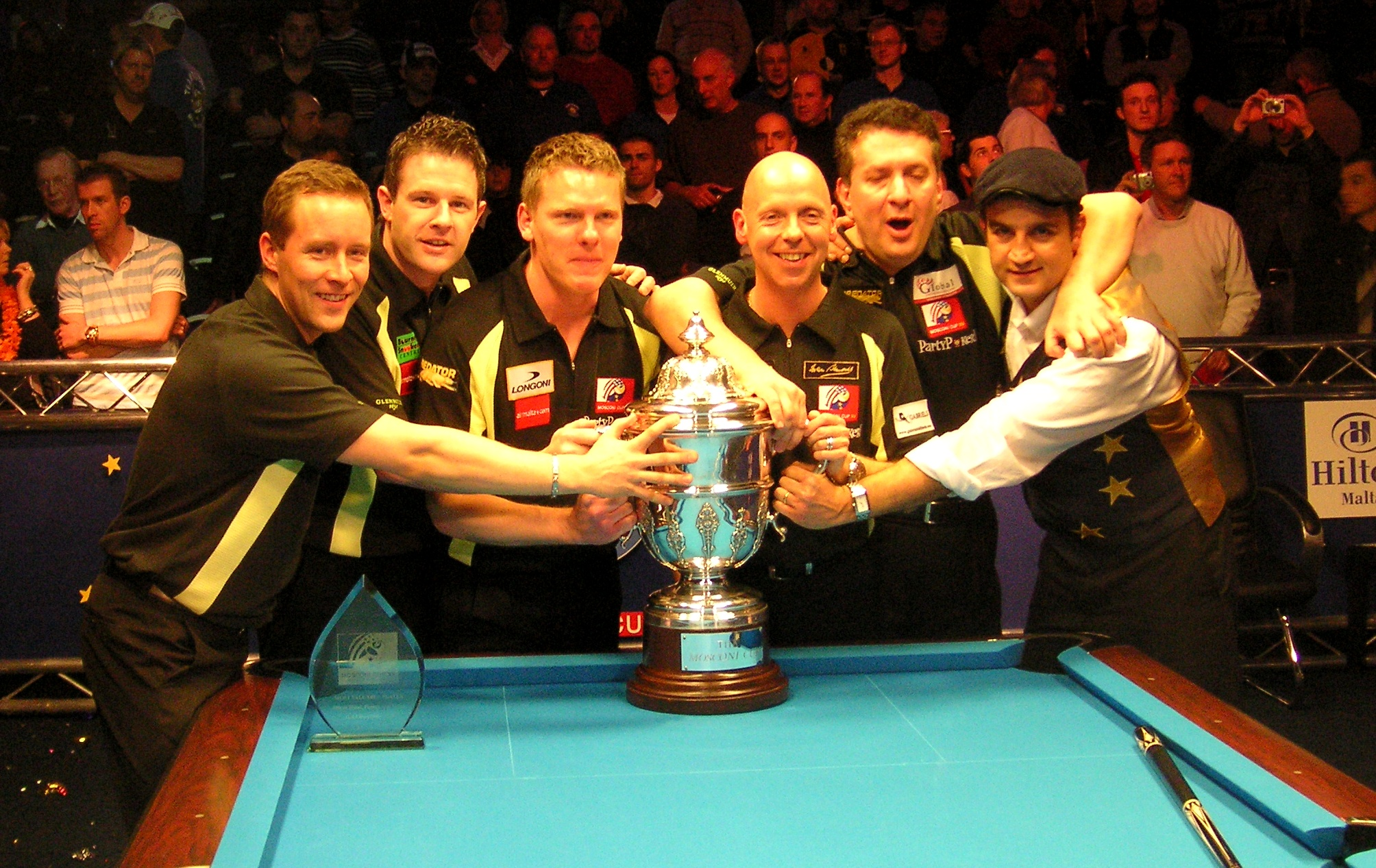
Team Europe

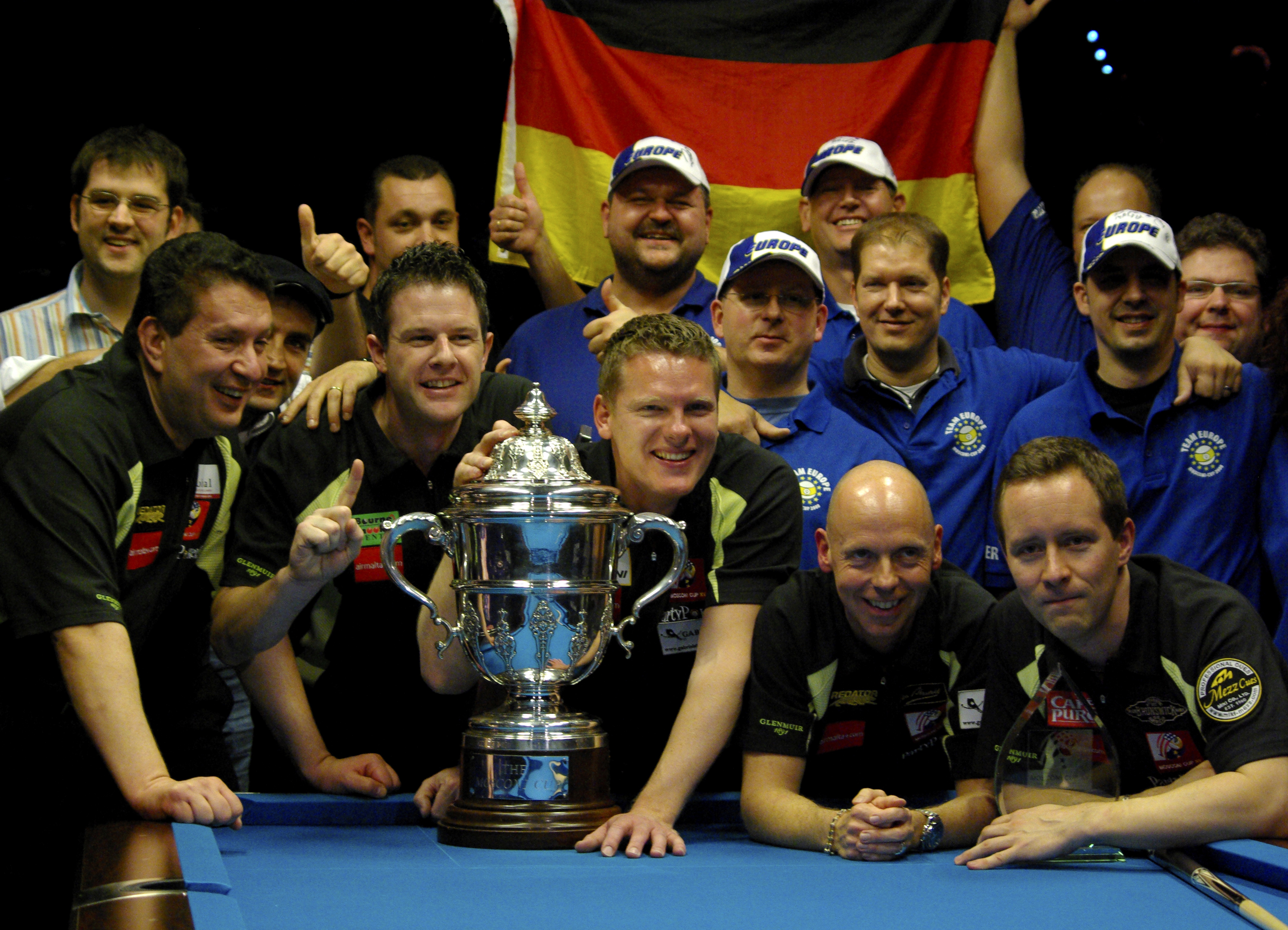
Team Europe
