= 2005 Mosconi Cup =

- Dates: 15–18 December
- Venue: MGM Grand
- Location: Las Vegas, Nevada
- Captains: Johnny Archer (US); Mika Immonen (EU)
- MVP: Earl Strickland (US)
- 11 – 6 United States wins the Mosconi Cup

The 2005 Mosconi Cup, the 12th edition of the annual nine-ball pool competition between teams representing Europe and the United States, took place 15–18 December 2005 at the MGM Grand in Las Vegas, Nevada. A shot clock was used for the first time in the events history.

Team USA won the Mosconi Cup by defeating Team Europe 11–6.

== Teams ==
Team USA
Name	State of birth	Notes
Rodney Morris	California
Shawn Putnam	Pennsylvania
Jeremy Jones	Texas
Earl Strickland	North Carolina	Most Valued Player
Charlie Williams	South Korea^{1}
Johnny Archer	Georgia	Captain

Team Europe
Name	Nationality	Notes
Marcus Chamat	Sweden
Raj Hundal	United Kingdom
Thorsten Hohmann	Germany
Niels Feijen	Netherlands
Alex Lely	Netherlands
Mika Immonen	Finland	Captain

- ^{1} Born outside the United States.

== Results ==
=== Thursday, 15 December ===
	Results
Doubles; Thorsten Hohmann; Niels Feijen	5–1	Doubles; Johnny Archer; Jeremy Jones
Singles; Mika Immonen	5–2	Singles; Johnny Archer
Doubles; Alex Lely; Raj Hundal	3–5	Doubles; Charlie Williams; Shawn Putnam
Singles; Niels Feijen	3–5	Singles; Charlie Williams
Doubles; Mika Immonen; Marcus Chamat	4–5	Doubles; Earl Strickland; Rodney Morris
2	Session	3
2	Overall	3

=== Friday, 16 December ===
	Results
Doubles; Thorsten Hohmann; Niels Feijen	4–5	Doubles; Charlie Williams; Shawn Putnam
Singles; Raj Hundal	5–4	Singles; Shawn Putnam
Doubles; Mika Immonen; Marcus Chamat	4–5	Doubles; Johnny Archer; Jeremy Jones
Singles; Thorsten Hohmann	5–4	Singles; Jeremy Jones
Doubles; Alex Lely; Raj Hundal	2–5	Doubles; Earl Strickland; Rodney Morris
2	Session	3
4	Overall	6

=== Saturday, 17 December ===
	Results
Doubles; Niels Feijen; Alex Lely	5–3	Doubles; Charlie Williams; Shawn Putnam
Singles; Alex Lely	4–5	Singles; Rodney Morris
Doubles; Marcus Chamat; Mika Immonen	2–5	Doubles; Rodney Morris; Earl Strickland
Singles; Marcus Chamat	2–5	Singles; Earl Strickland
Doubles; Thorsten Hohmann; Raj Hundal	3–5	Doubles; Jeremy Jones; Johnny Archer
1	Session	4
5	Overall	10

=== Sunday, 18 December ===
	Results
Singles; Mika Immonen	5–4	Singles; Shawn Putnam
Singles; Thorsten Hohmann	4–5	Singles; Jeremy Jones
1	Session	1
6	Overall	11
