= 2014 World Pool Masters =

World Pool Masters XXII
Tournament information
- Dates: 14–16 November 2014
- Venue: Portland Center
- City: Nottingham
- Country: England
- Organisation: Matchroom Sport
- Format: Invitational event
- Total prize fund: $70,000
- Winner's share: $20,000

Final
- Champion: (United States) Shane Van Boening
- Runner-up: (Greece) Nikos Ekonomopoulos
- Score: 8–2

The 2014 World Pool Masters, also known as World Pool Masters XXII, was a nine-ball pool tournament that took place in Nottingham, England, between 14–16 November 2014. It was the 22nd edition of the invitational tournament organised by Matchroom Sport. Shane Van Boening won the event, defeating Nikos Ekonomopoulos in the final 8–2.

Defending champion Niels Feijen lost his first round match to Italian Daniele Corrieri.

== Event prize money ==
| | Prize money |
|---|---|
| Winner | 20.000 US$ |
| Runner-up | 10.000 US$ |
| Semi-finalist | 5.000 US$ |
| Quarter-finalist | 2.500 US$ |
| Last 16 | 2.500 US$ |
| Total | 70.000 US$ |

== Tournament bracket ==
Round 1; 14-15 November 2014
1 | (Netherlands) Niels Feijen | 4
(Italy) Daniele Corrieri | 8
8 | (Poland) Karol Skowerski | 8
(China) Wang Can | 5
5 | (Germany) Thorsten Hohmann | 4
(Greece) Nikos Ekonomopoulos | 8
4 | (England) Darren Appleton | 6
(Canada) Alex Pagulayan | 8
3 | (Philippines) Dennis Orcollo | 6
(England) Chris Melling | 8
6 | (England) Karl Boyes | 8
(Qatar) Waleed Majid | 1
7 | (Finland) Mika Immonen | 4
(England) Mark Gray | 8
2 | (United States) Shane Van Boening | 8
(Australia) James Georgiadis | 6

Quarterfinal; 15-16 November 2014
(Italy) Daniele Corrieri | 3
8 | (Poland) Karol Skowerski | 8
(Greece) Nikos Ekonomopoulos | 8
(Canada) Alex Pagulayan | 3
(England) Chris Melling | 8
6 | (England) Karl Boyes | 6
(England) Mark Gray | 4
2 | (United States) Shane Van Boening | 8

Semifinal; 16 November 2014
(Poland) Karol Skowerski | 3
(Greece) Nikos Ekonomopoulos | 8
(England) Chris Melling | 5
2 | (United States) Shane Van Boening | 8

Final; 16 November 2014
(Greece) Nikos Ekonomopoulos | 2
2 | (United States) Shane Van Boening | 8
