= 2004 Mosconi Cup =

Annual nine-ball pool competition

- Dates: 16–19 December
- Venue: Hotel Zuiderduin
- Location: Egmond aan Zee, Netherlands
- Captains: Oliver Ortmann (EU); Johnny Archer (US)
- MVP: Rodney Morris (US)
- 9 – 12 United States wins the Mosconi Cup

The 2004 Mosconi Cup, the 11th edition of the annual nine-ball pool competition between teams representing Europe and the United States, took place 16–19 December 2004 at the Hotel Zuiderduin in Egmond aan Zee, Netherlands.

Team USA won the Mosconi Cup by defeating Team Europe 12–9.

== Teams ==
Team USA
Name	State of birth	Notes
Gabe Owen	Kansas
Rodney Morris	California	Most Valued Player
Earl Strickland	North Carolina
Charlie Williams	South Korea^{1}
Tony Robles	New York
Johnny Archer	Georgia	Captain

Team Europe
Name	Nationality	Notes
Mika Immonen	Finland
Marcus Chamat	Sweden
Steve Davis	United Kingdom
Niels Feijen	Netherlands
Thomas Engert	Germany
Oliver Ortmann	Germany	Captain

- ^{1} Born outside the United States.

== Results ==
=== Thursday, 16 December ===
==== Session 1 ====
	Results
Doubles; Steve Davis; Niels Feijen	5–4	Doubles; Charlie Williams; Tony Robles
Doubles; Oliver Ortmann; Thomas Engert	3–5	Doubles; Johnny Archer; Gabe Owen
Doubles; Mika Immonen; Marcus Chamat	1–5	Doubles; Earl Strickland; Rodney Morris
1	Session	2
1	Overall	2

=== Friday, 17 December ===
==== Session 2 ====
	Results
Doubles; Mika Immonen; Marcus Chamat	5–0	Doubles; Charlie Williams; Tony Robles
Doubles; Steve Davis; Niels Feijen	5–3	Doubles; Johnny Archer; Gabe Owen
Doubles; Oliver Ortmann; Thomas Engert	4–5	Doubles; Earl Strickland; Rodney Morris
2	Session	1
3	Overall	3

==== Session 3 ====
	Results
Singles; Mika Immonen	5–3	Singles; Johnny Archer
Singles; Niels Feijen	1–5	Singles; Charlie Williams
Singles; Steve Davis	4–5	Singles; Gabe Owen
1	Session	2
4	Overall	5

=== Saturday, 18 December ===
==== Session 4 ====
	Results
Doubles; Oliver Ortmann; Thomas Engert	4–5	Doubles; Johnny Archer; Gabe Owen
Doubles; Steve Davis; Niels Feijen	3–5	Doubles; Charlie Williams; Tony Robles
Doubles; Mika Immonen; Marcus Chamat	0–5	Doubles; Earl Strickland; Rodney Morris
0	Session	3
4	Overall	8

==== Session 5 ====
	Results
Singles; Thomas Engert	1–5	Singles; Rodney Morris
Singles; Oliver Ortmann	5–1	Singles; Tony Robles
Singles; Marcus Chamat	5–2	Singles; Earl Strickland
2	Session	1
6	Overall	9

=== Sunday, 19 December ===
==== Session 6 ====
	Results
Singles; Mika Immonen	3–5	Singles; Rodney Morris
Singles; Niels Feijen	5–2	Singles; Johnny Archer
Singles; Marcus Chamat	5–3	Singles; Tony Robles
2	Session	1
8	Overall	10

==== Session 7 ====
	Results
Singles; Thomas Engert	2–5	Singles; Gabe Owen
Singles; Oliver Ortmann	5–1	Singles; Earl Strickland
Singles; Steve Davis	2–5	Singles; Charlie Williams
1	Session	2
9	Overall	12
