= Ismael Páez =

Mexican pool player, born September 1950

Personal information
- Nickname: Morro
- Born: September 19, 1950 (age 75)

Pool career
- Country: Mexico
- Pool games: 9-Ball
- Best finish: Runner up – World 9-Ball 2000

Ismael Páez (born September 19, 1950) is a Mexican professional pool and card player, best known for being the runner-up at the 2000 WPA World Nine-ball Championship.

== Career ==
In September 1998, Ismael Páez defeated German Bernd Jahnke the Spanish 9-ball Open becoming the second non-European player after Francisco Bustamante to win a Euro Tour tournament. A month later, Páez finished 17th at the 1998 9-Ball World Championship. In July 2000, he reached the final of the 2000 WPA World Nine-ball Championship, after defeating Earl Strickland in the semi-final, but was defeated by Chao Fong-Pang 6–17.

In August 2000, he reached the knockout stages of the World Pool Masters. 9-Ball World Cup 2001 he retired in the round of the last 64 against the Swiss Dimitri Jungoout. In May 2002, Páez took ninth place at the IBC Nanki Classic. In July 2004, he took part in the 2004 WPA World Nine-ball Championship for the last time but lost in the preliminary round.

== Titles & achievements ==
- 2001 Jay Swanson Memorial 9-Ball
- 1999 Midwest 9-Ball Championship
- 1999 Andy Mercer Memorial 9-Ball
- 1998 Hard Times 9-Ball Open
- 1998 Euro Tour Spanish Open
- 1993 South Bay Billiards Open 9-Ball
- 1991 Al Romero Classic 9-Ball
- 1990 Japan Open 9-Ball
- 1989 Las Vegas Open 9-Ball
- 1988 Huebler Cup Open 9-Ball
