= Waleed Majid =

Qatari pool player, born 1987

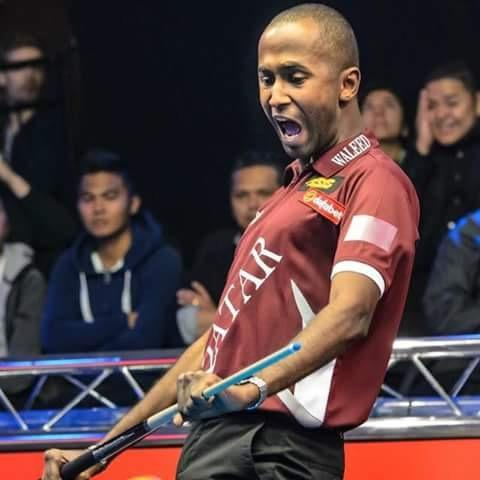

Personal information
- Nickname: "Black Mamba"
- Born: 22 September 1987 (age 38) Kuwait, Kuwait
- Website: http://www.waleedmajid.com/

Pool career
- Country: Qatar
- Turned pro: 2009
- Pool games: nine-ball, eight-ball, ten-ball
- Highest rank: 12

Waleed Majid (born 22 September 1987 in Kuwait) is a Qatari professional pool player. Majid has played in several World Cup of Pool events representing Qatar, including reaching the quarter-finals at the 2015 event.

Majid has also competed at the World Pool Masters competition, reaching the quarterfinals in 2015, defeating Daryl Peach.

Majid has also played Snooker at a high amateur level, most recently playing in the World Amateur Snooker Championship in 2018.

== Titles & Achievements ==
- 2022 Qatar 9-Ball Championship
- 2021 Qatar 8-Ball Championship
- 2014 Qatar Open Tournament
- 2015 Qatar West Asian Championship
- 2012 Qatar Ramadan Open Tournament
- 2012 Arab Open Tournament
