= Steve Knight (pool player) =

English pool player

Personal information
- Nickname: Knightrider
- Born: 12 July 1973 Manchester, England
- Died: 13 January 2019 (aged 45)

Pool career
- Country: England
- Pool games: 9-Ball
- Best finish: Quarter finals 1999 WPA World Nine-ball Championship

Steve Knight (12 July 1973 – 13 January 2019) was an English professional pool player. Knight spent four times representing the European team at the Mosconi Cup and was the winner of the 2000 World Pool League.

== Career ==
Knight's first major competition was at the 1997 World Pool Masters, reaching the second round of the competition. The following year he reached the quarter-finals of the event. Knight's best result at a world championship was at the 1999 World Professional Pool Championship, reaching the quarter-finals, before losing to Chao Fong-Pang.

In 2000, Knight reached the last 16 of the 2000 WPA World Nine-ball Championship, before losing to former champion Kunihiko Takahashi 9–0. He would compete once again in the World Pool Masters, this time reaching the semi-final.

Knight has also competed at the Mosconi Cup on four occasions. He played for the team between 1998 and 2001.

== Achievements ==
- 2000 World Pool League
