= Marcus Chamat =

Swedish pool player (born 1975)

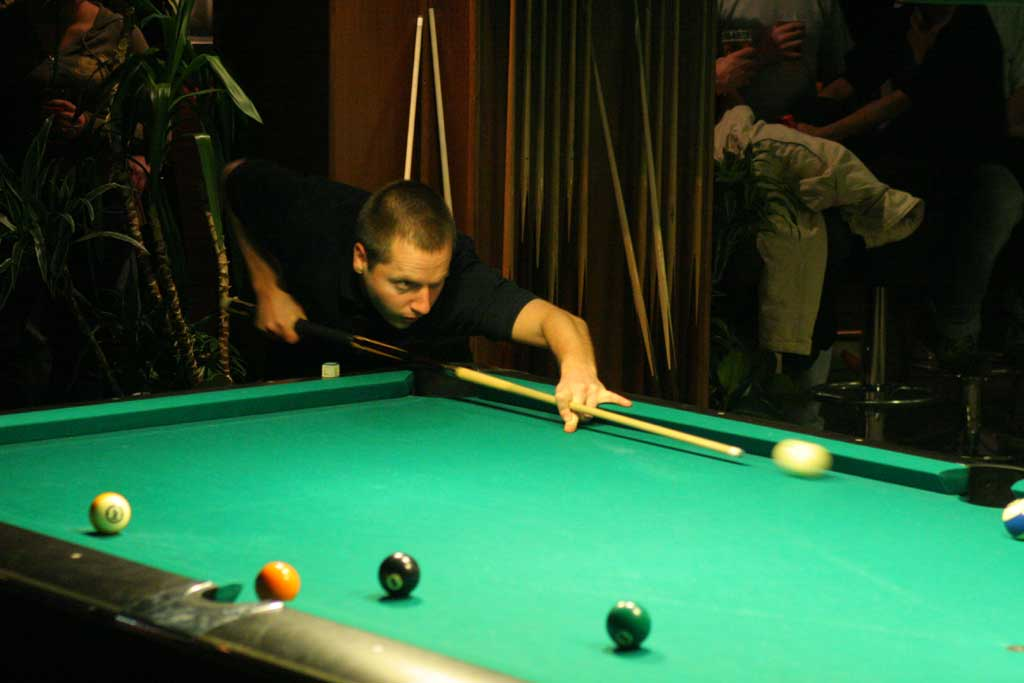
- During Interpool Open 2006 in Gävle, Sweden

Personal information
- Nickname: Napoleon
- Born: 6 May 1975 (age 51) Borlänge, Sweden

Pool career
- Country: Sweden
- Pool games: eight-ball, nine-ball, ten-ball

Marcus Chamat (Swedish pronunciation: [ˈmǎrːkɵs ɧaˈmatː]; born 6 May 1975) is a Swedish professional eight-ball and nine-ball pool player. He was nicknamed "Napoleon" due to his personality and standing at 5 ft 4 in (1.63 m) tall. He is a two time European Pool Championships winner and one of the most successful players on the Euro Tour, winning four events and finishing runner-up twice. Chamat reached the semi-finals of the 2004 WPA World Nine-Ball and the 2008 WPA World Eight-Ball Championships but did not reach the final of a world championship event.

He first represented Europe at the Mosconi Cup in 2000 and played for the continent six times. After retiring in 2015, he became the non-playing captain of the side, winning the event in 2015, 2016, and 2017.

== Career ==
In 2000, Chamat won his first major title by defeating Ralf Souquet in the final of the nine-ball event at the European Pool Championships. He won at the European championships again, this time in the eight-ball event in 2008, defeating Svilar Zoren in the final 8–3. Chamat has also been runner-up at the championships on two further occasions, being defeated in the final of the eight-ball in 2010 and the nine-ball in 2012.

Chamat reached the semi-finals of a world championship for the first time in 2004 at the 2004 WPA World Nine-Ball Championship. After the preliminary round, Chamat defeated Souquet, Ramil Gallego (both 9–6), Thorsten Schober (11–8), and Marlon Manalo (11–6). Chamat played Chang Pei-Wei in the semi-final but lost 11–9. He also reached this stage at the 2008 WPA World Eight-ball Championship, defeating Gabriele Cimmino, Kasper Kristoffersen (both 10–5), and Dimitri Jungo (10–6) before losing in the semi-final to Souquet 10–8.

Chamat played on the International Pool Tour and, as of 2019, also appears at Euro Tour events. Chamat is one of the most successful players on the Tour, with four event wins, starting with his first tournament win in 1999 at the Finland Open. He later won three more Euro Tour events, all in Austria in 2004, 2006, and 2009. With four victories overall, he is in the top 10 winners of Euro Tour events. Chamat also won the UPA World Pool Summit in 2005, defeating Corey Deuel in the finals.

Chamat semi-retired from professional pool in 2015 before taking over as captain at the Mosconi Cup. Shortly before this, Chamat reached the last 16 at the 2015 WPA World Ten-Ball Championship, losing to Yang Ching-shun 11–8.

=== Mosconi Cup ===
Chamat represented Team Europe at the Mosconi Cup six times (2000, 2001, 2002, 2003, 2004, and 2005). Despite the American side dominating the event at this time, the European side that Chamat won in 2002 was referred to as "one of the best moments of [his] career" by team-mate Steve Davis. During this period, Chamat secured 11 victories from 26 matches played at the event.

After failing to regain his place on the team in 2006, Chamat continued to play professionally; however, he took over as non-playing captain for Europe at the Mosconi Cup at the 2015 event. Chamat led the team to three victories at the 2015, 2016, and 2017 events. In his fourth event as captain, he saw a losing effort in 2018, the first USA victory since 2009. During the event, after Joshua Filler put Europe 3–0 ahead, he neglected to shake the hand of his opponent Dennis Hatch, which led to Hatch leaving the arena feeling aggrieved. Chamat, as captain, took Filler to one side to calm the player down. Filler later praised Chamat, saying, "He is the best captain." In total, Chamat has represented Europe at the event on ten occasions.

== Personal life ==
Chamat was born 6 May 1975, in Borlänge, Sweden. He is a co-owner of the Interpool Restaurant and Biljard clubs in Gävle, Uppsala, and Malmö, Sweden. The club has become a base for pool in Sweden and began to run international pool events in 2009, with the interpool open 9-ball starting in 2009. Chamat is nicknamed Napoleon for his attitude while playing pool and his small stature, standing at 5 ft 4 in (1.63 m) tall.

== Titles ==
- 2009 Euro Tour Austrian Open
- 2008 European Pool Championship 8-Ball
- 2006 Euro Tour Austrian Open
- 2005 UPA World Summit of Pool
- 2004 Euro Tour Austrian Open
- 2002 Mosconi Cup
- 2000 European Pool Championship 9-Ball
- 1999 Euro Tour Finland Open
