= Earl Strickland =

American pool player (born 1961)

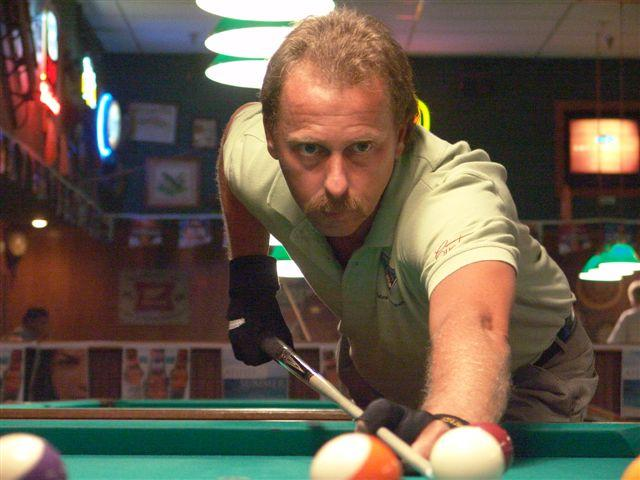

Personal information
- Nickname: "The Pearl"
- Born: June 8, 1961 (age 65) Roseboro, North Carolina, U.S.

Pool career
- Turned pro: 1981

Tournament wins
- Other titles: 100
- World Champion: Nine-ball (1990, 1991, 2002 PBA World Nine-Ball Championship 1988)
- Highest rank: 1

Earl Strickland (born June 8, 1961), nicknamed "Earl the Pearl," is an American professional pool player who is considered one of the best nine-ball players of all time. He has won over 100 championship titles and three world titles. In 2006 he was inducted into the Billiard Congress of America's Hall of Fame. In 1996, Strickland won the largest cash prize to date winning the PCA $1,000,000 Challenge by being the first player to run 10 consecutive racks in a tournament.

== Career ==
Strickland started playing pool at the age of 8. After intensive practice, he entered his first professional tournament aged 16. Strickland rose to national prominence in 1983 with a victory in Caesars Tahoe Billiard Classic defeating Steve Mizerak in the finals and winning $35,000. This was followed in 1984 by winning the McDermott Masters 9-Ball Championship.

According to sources, Strickland played "like a polished gem." He was beginning to be a dominant force on the tournament trail and recognized as a future world champion. He had the "skill, endurance, patience, temperament, and tenacity of which champions are made." Because of his dominance, Strickland was named The National Billiard News Player of the Year in 1984. He won the 1988 PBA World 9-Ball Championship by defeating Mike Sigel. He won the WPA World Nine-ball Championship in 1990, 1991 and 2002 where he faced Francisco Bustamante in the final. In a race to 17, Strickland trailed 13-15 but won the last four racks to claim a 17–15 victory.

In 2022, aged 61, Strickland was named as a wild card selection for Team USA in the Mosconi Cup. Team USA's attempt to win a record tenth Mosconi Cup crown was unsuccessful as Team Europe defeated them 11‍–‍7.

== Awards and accolades ==
Strickland is a multiple winner of the prestigious Billiards Digest Player of the Year in 1984, 1985, 1987, 1988 and 2000 including Billiards Digest Player of the Decade in the 1980s.

He has won a record three WPA World Nine-ball Championships and a record five U.S. Open Nine-ball Championships along with Shane Van Boening & a record three McDermott Masters 9-Ball Championships. Strickland is the only WPA World Nine-ball Champion ever to win the event in consecutive years. At the Mosconi Cup, from 1996 until 2005, Strickland holds the record for winning nine times along with Johnny Archer.

Strickland once ran 11 consecutive racks against Nick Mannino during the first PCA tournament in 1996 where there was a stipulation that anyone who could break and run 10 racks would win US$1,000,000. Jimmy Mataya, who was present at the event, witnessed Strickland's last shot, a tough nine-ball combination in which Earl "fired it in with authority" to win the prize. Up to that time, no one had ever run 10 racks of 9-ball in a row during a professionally sanctioned event. This Million dollar Challenge event was a kickoff for the new tour, which Strickland, C.J. Wiley, and others helped to build. He won it on the first day of the event and the very start of the brand new tour association (PCA). The insurance company backing the event refused to pay and lawsuits were filed. The dispute was over what was considered a "run rack" as during Earl's run, he made nine-on-the-breaks and early nines, as well as run the balls 1–9 in order, which is officially considered a run rack. The final rack was also an early nine made by a combination shot. Two and a half years later, the insurers were forced to pay up. Unfortunately, due to expenses of the legal battle, Earl received less than a $1,000,000 and this resulted in negative publicity around it and contributed to the demise of the new PCA tour. The scandal and an existing feud with the Professional Billiards Tour fearing lost revenues and television contracts led to a quick demise of the new tour.

For 2007, he was ranked #6 in Pool & Billiard Magazine's "Fans' Top 20 Favorite Players" poll.

== Career titles and achievements ==
- 2026 Best in Billiards 250 years- Best 9-Ball Player Award
- 2026 Matchroom WNT Legends
- 2018 Maryland Bar Table 9-Ball Championship
- 2017 German Pool Masters
- 2017 Maryland Bar Table 10-Ball Championship
- 2013 Turning Stone Classic
- 2012 Empire State 10-Ball Championship
- 2012 Ginky Memorial Open 9-Ball
- 2010 Steve Mizerak 10-Ball Championship
- 2010 CSI US Bar Table 8-Ball Championship
- 2007 Carolinas Open One Pocket
- 2006 Billiard Congress of America Hall of Fame
- 2005 Mosconi Cup (MVP)
- 2005 Mosconi Cup
- 2004 Mosconi Cup
- 2004 World All Stars Invitational Team Cup
- 2003 Mosconi Cup
- 2003 World Pool Masters Trick Shot Challenge
- 2003 Joss Northeast Tour 9-Ball
- 2003 Viking National Nine-ball Championship
- 2002 WPA World Nine-ball Championship
- 2002 Joss Northeast Tour 9-Ball
- 2001 Mosconi Cup
- 2000 Billiards Digest Player of the Year
- 2000 Mosconi Cup
- 2000 U.S. Open Nine-ball Championship
- 2000 United States-Philippines 9-Ball Challenge
- 1999 Billiards Digest 8th Greatest Living Player of the Century
- 1999 Mosconi Cup
- 1999 Camel Points Bonus
- 1999 Camel Shooters Nine-ball Open
- 1999 Camel Riviera Eight-Ball Open
- 1998 Mosconi Cup
- 1997 U.S. Open Nine-ball Championship
- 1997 World Pool Masters
- 1997 Mosconi Cup
- 1996 Mosconi Cup
- 1996 PCA Million Dollar Challenge
- 1995 PBT Eastern State 9-Ball Open
- 1994 Glass City Open Nine-ball
- 1994 PBT Riviera Nine-Ball Championship
- 1993 U.S. Open Nine-ball Championship
- 1993 PBT Florida Flare Up
- 1993 PBT Western 9-Ball Open
- 1993 Glass City 9-Ball Open
- 1992 South Bay Billiards 9-Ball Open
- 1992 Can-Am Challenge 9-Ball Open
- 1992 McDermott Masters 9-Ball Championship
- 1992 Los Angeles Open 9-Ball Championship
- 1992 Sands Regency 9-Ball Open
- 1991 McDermott Masters 9-Ball Championship
- 1991 WPA World Nine-ball Championship
- 1990 Capital City 9-Ball Open
- 1990 Lexington All-Star Nine-ball
- 1990 Sands Regency 9-Ball Open
- 1990 WPA World Nine-ball Championship
- 1990 Billiards Digest Player of the Decade- 1980s
- 1989 Capital City 9-Ball Open
- 1989 Cue Time Classic 9-Ball
- 1988 Billiards Digest Player of the Year
- 1988 Tara 9-Ball Open
- 1988 PBA World 9-Ball Championship
- 1988 Shoals Classic 9-Ball
- 1988 Lexington All-Star Nine-ball
- 1988 Augusta Classic 9-Ball
- 1988 Greater Greenville 9-Ball Open
- 1988 Cue Time Classic 9-Ball
- 1988 Akron 9-Ball Open
- 1988 South Carolina 9-Ball Open
- 1987 Billiards Digest Player of the Year
- 1987 U.S. Open Nine-ball Championship
- 1987 North Carolina Fall 9-Ball Classic
- 1987 Joe Farhat 9-Ball Open
- 1987 Bowling Green 9-Ball Open
- 1987 Tara 9-Ball Open
- 1987 Sands Regency 9-Ball Open
- 1987 Charlotte 9-Ball Open
- 1987 Fall Classic 9-Ball
- 1987 Akron 9-Ball Open
- 1986 B.C. Open 9-Ball Pro-Am Doubles
- 1986 South Carolina 9-Ball Open
- 1986 Bowling Green 9-Ball Open
- 1986 Citrus 9-Ball Open
- 1985 Billiards Digest Player of the Year
- 1985 North California Fall 9-Ball Classic
- 1985 Tar Heel 9-Ball Open
- 1985 Clyde Childress Memorial 9-Ball Open
- 1985 Dayton 9-Ball Open
- 1985 Akron 9-Ball Open
- 1985 West Virginia State 9-Ball Open
- 1985 Challenge Match Race to 45 vs. (Mike Sigel)
- 1984 Billiards Digest Player of the Year
- 1984 U.S. Open Nine-ball Championship
- 1984 Caesars Palace Billiard Classic
- 1984 Houston Red's 9-Ball Open
- 1984 McDermott Masters 9-Ball Championship
- 1984 Akron 9-Ball Open
- 1983 Caesars Tahoe Billiard Classic
- 1982 Dayton 9-Ball Open
- 1982 Akron 9-Ball Open
