= Johnny Archer =

American professional pool player

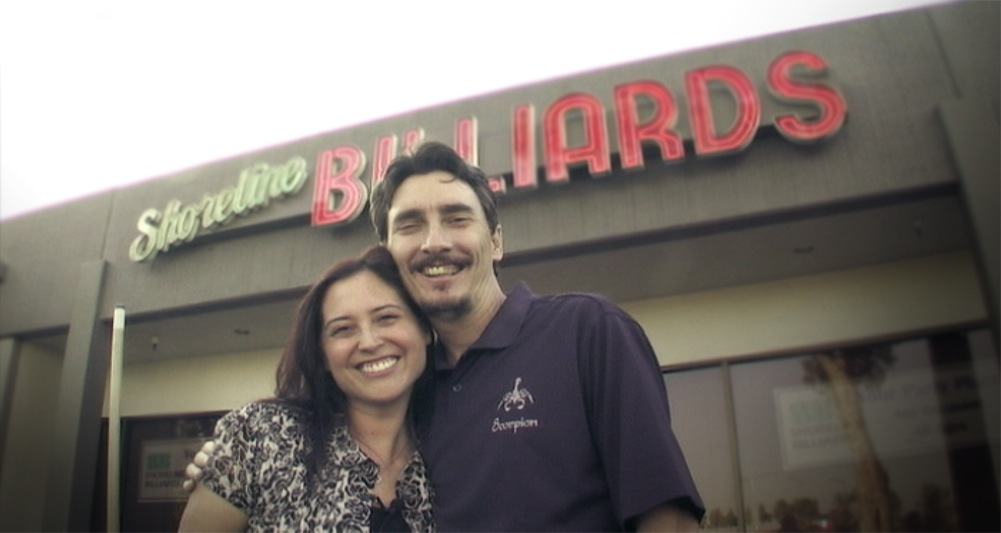
- Archer posing with a fan in 2008

Personal information
- Nickname: "The Scorpion"
- Born: 12 November 1968 (age 57) Waycross, Georgia, U.S.

Pool career
- Country: United States
- Turned pro: 1985

Tournament wins
- Other titles: 100
- World Champion: 9-ball (1992, 1997)

Johnny Archer (born November 12, 1968) is an American professional pool player. He is nicknamed "the Scorpion" (his zodiac sign is Scorpio). He is a two time World Nine-ball Champion & won a record 5 Sands Regency 9-Ball Open titles. In 2009, Johnny Archer was nominated to be inducted into the Billiard Congress of America Hall of Fame.

== Early days ==
Archer grew up with his two brothers and two sisters in Twin City, Georgia, and began playing pool at the age of 12.

== Career ==
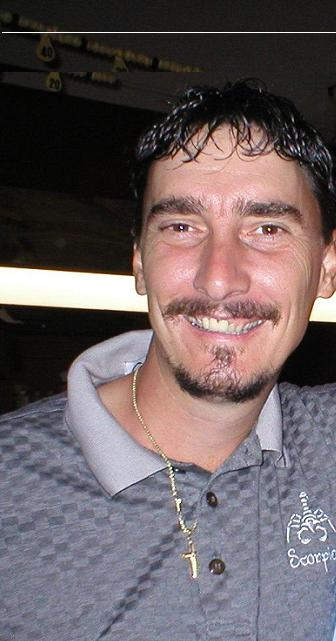

He is one of the most successful nine-ball players of the 1990s and 2000s, having won the majority of the game's major tournaments at least once, culminating in his being named Billiards Digest Player of the Decade at the end of the 1990s. Archer is a two-time WPA World Nine-ball Champion, winning in both 1992 when he defeated Bobby Hunter, and later again in 1997 after beating Lee Kun-fang of Chinese Taipei (Taiwan). He was also a runner-up the following year, losing in the final to Kunihiko Takahashi of Japan. He was the 1999 US Open champion, and has won over 100 professional tournaments throughout his career.

He has also been a regular on the US Mosconi Cup team, having joined them a record seventeen times, winning on nine of those occasions.

In 2003, one of Archer's most successful years, he won tournaments such as Sudden Death Seven-ball and the first World Summit of Pool.

Archer also won the 2006 International Challenge of Champions by defeating Thorsten Hohmann in the finals.

In 2007, he won the Texas Hold 'Em Billiards Championship. While in the 2005 event the entire purse was awarded to the winner, in the 2007 event the purse was split.

The Ripley's Believe It or Not! television show, on September 3, 2003, pitted Archer and Jeremy Jones against each other in a challenge match in speed pool. The show had them timed against each other, to try to beat the record, which at that time stood at 1 minute 30 seconds to break a full rack of balls and then pocket all fifteen balls, and then move to another table and do it again. Archer was the victor. The event was recorded in a warehouse in Los Angeles where other challenge matches were also taking place to beat records.

Archer rejoined the staff of Inside Pool Magazine, where he writes a monthly instruction column.

For 2007, he was ranked #3 in Pool & Billiard Magazine's "Fans' Top 20 Favorite Players" poll.

As of 2025 Archer still participates in local and regional tournaments. In March 2025 he bested Matt Washington (ironically also nicknamed "Scorpion") in a 9-ball tournament in Georgia.

== Personal life ==
Archer lives in Acworth, Georgia, with his two children. He's an avid golfer, and ascribes his strong pool break to playing a lot of golf, noting similarities in having the timing right and using one's whole body in the stroke.

== Titles and achievements ==
- 2016 Hangelar 9-Ball Open
- 2016 Tennessee State 8-Ball Open
- 2015 Tornado Open 9-Ball Championship
- 2013 Music City Classic 9-Ball
- 2012 Music City Classic 9-Ball
- 2011 Maryland 14.1 Championship
- 2011 Music City Classic 9-Ball
- 2011 Challenge du St. Laurent 9-Ball
- 2010 Turning Stone Classic
- 2009 Steve Mizerak 10-Ball Championship
- 2009 Turning Stone Classic
- 2009 U.S. 10-Ball Invitational
- 2009 Gem City Classic
- 2009 Mosconi Cup
- 2008 Turning Stone Classic
- 2008 UPA Desert Shoot Out
- 2008 Turning Stone Classic
- 2008 Jay Swanson Memorial 9-Ball
- 2007 Texas Hold 'Em Billiards Championship
- 2007 Music City Classic 9-Ball Mini
- 2007 Turning Stone Classic
- 2007 Great Southern Billiard Tour
- 2006 International Challenge of Champions
- 2006 Turning Stone Classic
- 2006 Music City Classic 9-Ball
- 2006 Puerto Rico Shootout
- 2006 SML Entertainment Open 9-Ball Championship
- 2005 Mosconi Cup
- 2005 Predator Florida Pro 9-Ball Open
- 2005 Glass City Open 9-Ball Championship
- 2004 Super Billiards Expo Players Championship
- 2004 Big Apple 9-Ball Championship
- 2004 North American Open Tour
- 2004 Carolinas Open 9-Ball Division
- 2004 Predator Florida Pro 9-Ball Open
- 2004 Derby City Classic 10-Ball Ring Game
- 2004 Mosconi Cup
- 2004 Billiards Digest Player of the Year
- 2004 Border Battle, Team USA VS Team Canada
- 2003 Glass City Open 9-Ball Championship
- 2003 Molson Cup
- 2003 Border Battle, Team USA VS Team Canada
- 2003 World Summit of Pool
- 2003 Super Billiards Expo Players Championship
- 2003 ESPN Sudden Death Seven-ball
- 2003 Predator Florida Pro 9-Ball Open
- 2003 Predator Atlanta 9-Ball Open
- 2003 LG Flatiron "On Cue 2" 9-Ball Tournament
- 2003 IBC Western Canadian Open 9-Ball
- 2003 Mosconi Cup
- 2003 Billiards Digest Player of the Year
- 2002 Capital City Classic 9-Ball
- 2002 Joss Northeast Tour
- 2001 Mosconi Cup
- 2001 Border Battle, Team USA VS Team Canada
- 2000 BCA Open Nine-ball Championship
- 2000 Music City Classic 9-Ball
- 2000 Euro Tour Portugal Open
- 2000 Euro Tour Italy Open
- 2000 Mosconi Cup
- 2000 Billiards Digest Player of the Decade- 1990s
- 1999 Billiards Digest Player of the Year
- 1999 Mosconi Cup
- 1999 US Open Nine-ball Championship
- 1999 Camel Kasson Open
- 1998 Mosconi Cup
- 1998 ESPN Ultimate Challenge 9-Ball
- 1997 Mosconi Cup
- 1997 PCA Viking Challenge
- 1997 WPA World Nine-ball Championship
- 1996 Billiards Digest Player of the Year
- 1996 PBT Pro Tour Nine-Ball Championship
- 1995 Sands Regency 9-Ball Open
- 1995 PBT Riviera Nine-Ball Championship
- 1994 PBT Florida Flare Up II
- 1994 Sands Regency 9-Ball Open
- 1994 Touch of Class Billiards 9-Ball Classic
- 1993 Billiards Digest Player of the Year
- 1993 PBT Riviera Nine-Ball Championship
- 1993 McDermott Masters 9-Ball Championship
- 1993 Capital City Open 9-Ball
- 1993 Bicycle Club 9-Ball Invitational
- 1993 Sands Regency 9-Ball Open
- 1993 Texas Tornado 9-Ball Tournament
- 1992 Billiards Digest Player of the Year
- 1992 WPA World Nine-ball Championship
- 1992 Sands Regency 9-Ball Open
- 1992 Beach Ball Open 9-Ball
- 1992 International 9-Ball Classic
- 1992 Q-Masters Championship
- 1992 Kupolen Challenge Cup
- 1991 Sands Last Call For 9-Ball
- 1991 Cleveland Open 9-Ball
- 1991 Spring Fling Open 9-Ball
- 1991 Sands Regency 9-Ball Open
- 1990 Willard's 9-Ball Classic
- 1989 Wiregrass Open 9-Ball
- 1989 B.C. Open 9-Ball Pro-Am Doubles
- 1988 Huebler Cup Open 9-Ball
