= Mika Immonen =

Finnish pool player (1972–2025)

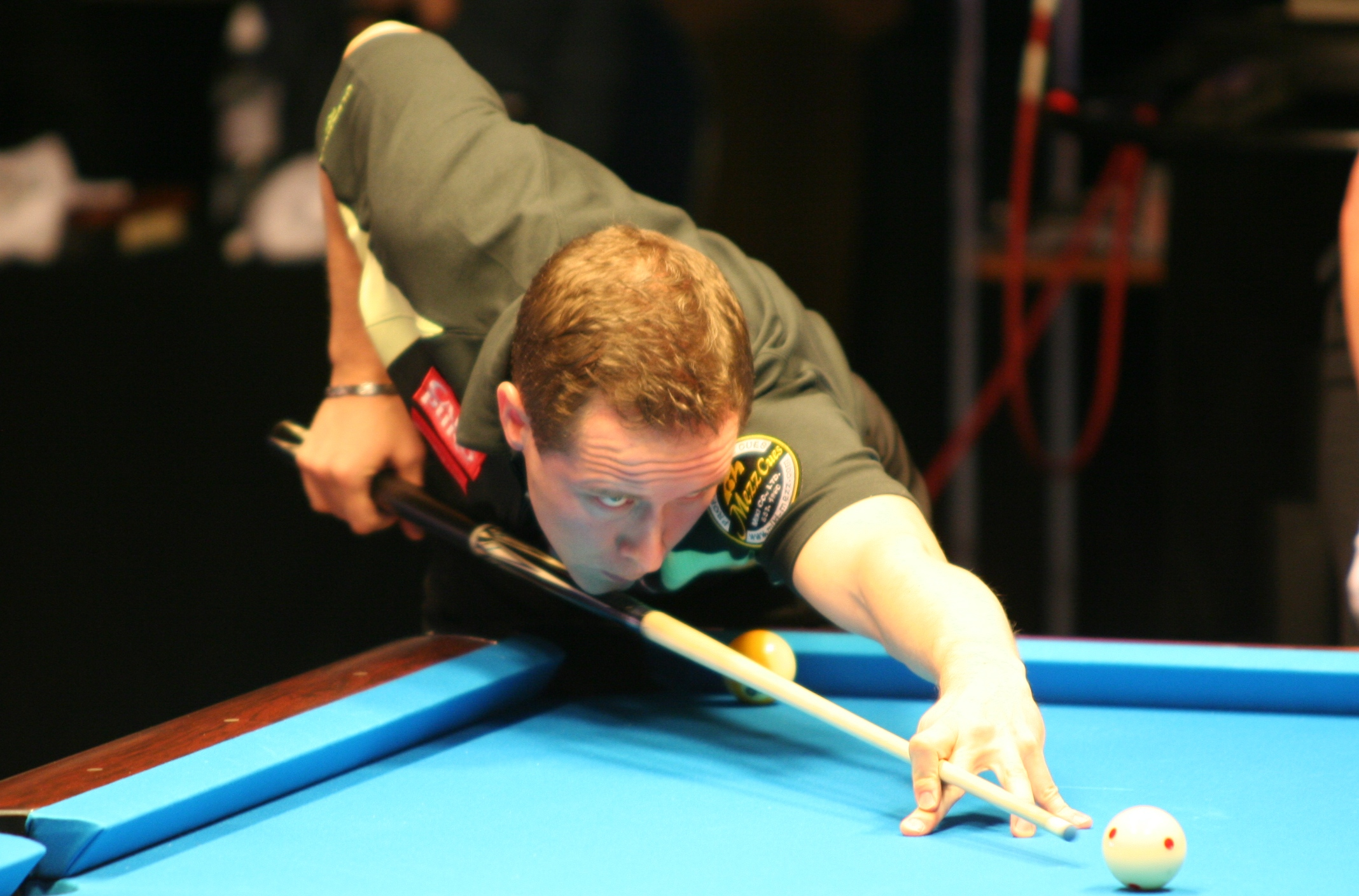
- Immonen at the 2008 Mosconi Cup

Personal information
- Nickname: "The Iceman"
- Born: 17 December 1972 London, England
- Died: 28 September 2025 (aged 52) New York City, U.S.

Pool career
- Country: Finland
- Pool games: 9-Ball, 10-ball, Straight pool

Tournament wins
- World Champion: 9-Ball (2001), 10-Ball (2009)
- Highest rank: 1

Mika Immonen (17 December 1972 – 28 September 2025) was a Finnish professional Hall of Fame pool player, nicknamed "The Iceman."

== Biography ==
Immonen was born on 17 December 1972 in London, England, where his Finnish parents were living due to his father's work. In the early 1980s, the family relocated to Finland. He began playing snooker at an early age and was known to have made several century breaks, before becoming a pool player in the early 90s. In 2000, Immonen moved to New York City, United States.

Immonen won the 2001 WPA World Nine-ball Championship in Cardiff, Wales. That same year, he was the runner-up to Corey Deuel in the US Open Nine-ball Championship.

In 2002 he won the UPA International Ten-ball Championship.

He has represented Team Europe on fifteen occasions in the Mosconi Cup, most recently in 2013. During the 2008 event Immonen was crowned MVP, forever banishing bad memories of a costly miss in the final game of the 2006 event.

In early 2009, Immonen was awarded the title of Player of the Year. Subsequently, he also claimed that title for season 2009 and was awarded early 2010.

Immonen was a two-time Men's Division title-holder of the US Open Nine-ball Championship, where the world's top professional billiard players compete in Chesapeake, Virginia. In 2009 Immonen won 14 straight matches, finishing with a close 13–10 victory over Ralf Souquet in the finals. On 26 October 2008, Immonen claimed a 13–7 victory and pocketed the first-place prize of US$40,000 against runner-up Filipino Ronato Alcano, who settled for $20,000.

Immonen made it to the finals of the 2009 Dragon 14.1 Tournament, where he was defeated in the finals by Stephan Cohen of France. Also in 2009, Immonen bested Darren Appleton to win the International Challenge of Champions, a tournament where he once reached the finals in 2002 but lost the sudden-death rack to Efren Reyes.

In late November 2009 Immonen finally won his second World Title in Manila at the WPA World Ten-ball Championships. He dominated the Philippine hope Lee Vann Corteza in the finals 11–6.

Billiard Congress of American Hall of Fame class of 2014, aged 41.

In September 2016, in New York, he won the Dragon 14.1 Tournament, defeating Earl Strickland 300–270 in the finals.

Immonen died from cancer at a hospital in Manhattan, New York, on 28 September 2025, at the age of 52. He suffered from adenocarcinoma and had been diagnosed with colon and rectal cancer in December 2023.

== Career titles ==
- 1991 Finnish Pool Championship 8-Ball
- 1992 Finnish Pool Championship 8-Ball
- 1992 Euro Tour Belgium Open
- 1992 Finnish Pool Championship 14.1
- 1994 Finnish Pool Championship 14.1
- 1995 Euro Tour German Open
- 1995 Euro Tour Finland Open
- 1996 Finnish Pool Championship 14.1
- 1996 Peace World All-Star Championship
- 1997 Finnish Pool Championship 9-Ball
- 1997 Finnish Pool Championship 8-Ball
- 1997 Finnish Pool Championship 14.1
- 1998 European Pool Championship 14.1
- 1998 Finnish Pool Championship 9-Ball
- 2000 USA Billiards Challenger Event
- 2000 ESPN Sudden Death Seven-ball
- 2001 WPA World Nine-ball Championship
- 2002 LG Flatron Challenge
- 2002 Derby City Classic 9-Ball
- 2002 Predator Central Florida 9-Ball Open
- 2002 Mosconi Cup
- 2003 On Cue; Philippines vs. Europe
- 2003 Philippine Open Championship
- 2003 Mosconi Cup (MVP)
- 2004 Atlanta Open
- 2004 UPA Pro Tour Championship
- 2005 Finnish Pool Championship 8-Ball
- 2005 Atlanta Open
- 2006 Norwegian 9-Ball Challenge
- 2006 Weert Open 7-Ball Event
- 2006 Weert Open 9-Ball Event
- 2007 Derby City Classic 14.1 Challenge
- 2007 American 14.1 Straight Pool Championship
- 2007 Korean Pro Tour Championship
- 2008 U.S. Open 9-Ball Championship
- 2008 Mosconi Cup
- 2008 Mosconi Cup (MVP)
- 2008 Quezon City Invasion
- 2008 All Japan Championship 9-Ball
- 2008 Billiards Digest Player of the Year
- 2009 Galveston Classic 10-Ball
- 2009 U.S. Open 9-Ball Championship
- 2009 Mezz Classic 10-Ball Event
- 2009 Blackpool Open
- 2009 Joss NE 9-Ball Tour Stop
- 2009 Tri State Tour Stop
- 2009 Predator Tour Stop
- 2009 Joss NE 9-Ball Tour Stop
- 2009 International Challenge of Champions
- 2009 Qatar Open 9-Ball Championship
- 2009 WPA World Ten-ball Championship
- 2009 Billiards Digest Player of the Year
- 2010 Billiards Digest Player of the Decade- 2000s
- 2010 Mosconi Cup
- 2010 International Challenge of Champions
- 2010 Ozone 10-Ball Championships
- 2010 Poison Doubles 8-ball Championships
- 2010 U.S. Billiards Media Association Player of the Year
- 2011 Masters 10-Ball Championship
- 2012 World Cup of Pool - with (Petri Makkonen)
- 2013 Mosconi Cup
- 2013 Ultimate 10-Ball Championship
- 2014 Billiard Congress of America Hall of Fame
- 2014 Nick Varner Classic Pro event
- 2015 Kings Cup 10-Ball Team East vs. West
- 2016 Turning Stone Classic
- 2016 Dragon World 14.1 Tournament
- 2017 World Pool Series Simonis Challenge
- 2017 Canadian 9-Ball Open
- 2019 Derby City Classic 14.1 Challenge
- 2022 Super Billiards Expo Senior Players Championship

== Instructional releases ==
In late 2008 Mika teamed up with Intrinsic Media to produce Mastering Pool, a three-part pocket billiard instructional series. The DVD series is packed with tips, techniques, systems, 3D animated diagrams, and expert commentary by Immonen himself.
