= 2017 Derby City Classic =

The 2017 Derby City Classic was a professional pool tournament held from the January 20 to 28, 2017 in Horseshoe Southern Indiana in Elizabeth, Indiana. It was the 19th hosting the event. Competitions were held in the disciplines nine-ball, ten-ball, one-pocket, straight, and bank pool. The event was the 2017 edition of the Derby City Classic.

The Master of the Table awarded for the best player overall was won by Dennis Orcollo who defeated Shane Van Boening 9–3 in the final of the nine-ball competition and won third place in the one-pocket competition.

== Results ==
Discipline	Winner	Runner-up	Semi-finals
Nine-ball	(Philippines) Dennis Orcollo	(United States) Shane Van Boening	(Canada) Ramon Mistica
Bigfoot ten-ball challenge	(Scotland) Jayson Shaw	(Greece) Alexander Kazakis	(Philippines) Lee Vann Corteza
Bigfoot ten-ball challenge	(Scotland) Jayson Shaw	(Greece) Alexander Kazakis	(Philippines) Carlo Biado
Bank pool	(Philippines) Francisco Bustamante	(United States) Larry Nevel	(Philippines) Warren Kiamco
Bank pool	(Philippines) Francisco Bustamante	(United States) Larry Nevel	(United States) Shannon Murphy
One pocket	(United States) Billy Thorpe	(Canada) Alex Pagulayan	(Philippines) Dennis Orcollo
One pocket	(United States) Billy Thorpe	(Canada) Alex Pagulayan	(United States) Skyler Woodward
Bank Pool Ring Game	(United States) Shannon Daulton	(United States) Skyler Woodward	(Scotland) Jayson Shaw
Bank Pool Ring Game	(United States) Shannon Daulton	(United States) Skyler Woodward	(United States) Billy Thorpe
Straight pool	(England) Chris Melling	(Finland) Mika Immonen	(England) Darren Appleton
Straight pool	(England) Chris Melling	(Finland) Mika Immonen	(Scotland) Jayson Shaw
Master of the Table	(Philippines) Dennis Orcollo	(United States) Billy Thorpe	(Philippines) Francisco Bustamante

=== Bigfoot 10-Ball-Challenge ===
The Bigfoot ten-ball challenge competition ran from January 20–24, 2017. Below is the results from the last-16 onwards.

First round
1	(United States) John Gabriel	5
16	(United States) Skyler Woodward	11
8	(Philippines) Johann Chua	10
9	(Philippines) Lee Vann Corteza	11
5	(Philippines) Dennis Orcollo	11
12	(United States) Shane Van Boening	9
4	(Greece) Nikos Ekonomopoulos	1
13	(Scotland) Jayson Shaw	11
6	(England) Karl Boyes	6
11	(Germany) Thorsten Hohmann	11
3	(Canada) Alex Pagulayan	5
14	(Greece) Alexander Kazakis	11
7	(Russia) Fedor Gorst	11
10	(England) Darren Appleton	10
2	(Philippines) Carlo Biado	11
15	(Russia) Ruslan Tschinachow	8

Quarter-finals
(United States) Skyler Woodward	7
(Philippines) Lee Vann Corteza	11
(Philippines) Dennis Orcollo	7
(Scotland) Jayson Shaw	11
(Germany) Thorsten Hohmann	6
(Greece) Alexander Kazakis	11
(Russia) Fedor Gorst	10
(Philippines) Carlo Biado	11

Semi-finals
(Philippines) Lee Vann Corteza	10
(Scotland) Jayson Shaw	11
(Greece) Alexander Kazakis	11
(Philippines) Carlo Biado	10

Final
(Scotland) Jayson Shaw	11
(Greece) Alexander Kazakis	7
