= 2014 Derby City Classic =

The 2014 Derby City Classic was a professional pool tournament and the 16th Edition of the Derby City Classic. It took place from January 24 to February 1, 2014, in Horseshoe Southern Indiana in Elizabeth, Indiana. Competitions were held in the disciplines nine-ball, ten-ball, one-pocket, straight, and bank pool. The Master of the Table awarded for the best player overall was won by Dennis Orcollo.

== Results ==
Discipline	Winner	Runner-up	Semi-finals
Bank Pool	(Philippines) Dennis Orcollo	(Philippines) Francisco Bustamante	(United States) Earl Strickland
Bigfoot ten-ball challenge	(United States) Shane Van Boening	(Netherlands) Niels Feijen	(Philippines) Francisco Bustamante
Bigfoot ten-ball challenge	(United States) Shane Van Boening	(Netherlands) Niels Feijen	(Germany) Ralf Souquet
Straight Pool challenge	(Philippines) Dennis Orcollo	(Russia) Konstantin Stepanov	(Netherlands) Huidji See
Straight Pool challenge	(Philippines) Dennis Orcollo	(Russia) Konstantin Stepanov	(Netherlands) Alex Lely
One Pocket	(Philippines) Efren Reyes	(United States) Shannon Daulton	(United States) Scott Frost
Bank Pool Ring Game	(United States) Skyler Woodward	(Philippines) Francisco Bustamante	(United States) Shannon Daulton
Nine-ball	(United States) Shane Van Boening	(Canada) John Morra	(Canada) Jason Klatt
Master of the Table	(Philippines) Dennis Orcollo	(United States) Shane Van Boening	(Philippines) Efren Reyes

=== Nine-ball ===
The nine-ball competition took place from January 29 to February 1. With a total prize money of over $64,000, of which the winner received $16,000, was the most highest prize fund for any competition in the Derby City Classic. The ranking of the 45 best-placed players is given below.

Platz	Position
1	(United States) Shane Van Boening
2	(Canada) John Morra
3	(Canada) Jason Klatt
4	(Russia) Ruslan Chinakhov
4	(Philippines) Dennis Orcollo
6	(Philippines) Efren Reyes
6	(Netherlands) Niels Feijen
6	(United States) Mike Dechaine
6	(Philippines) Carlo Biado
10	(Kuwait) Bader al-Awadi
10	(United States) Johnny Archer
10	(United States) Shannon Murphy
13	(United States) Joey Gray
13	(United States) Robb Saez
13	(United States) Shawn Putnam
13	(United States) Shaun Wilkie
13	(United States) Justin Bergman
13	(Germany) Ralf Souquet
13	(United States) Larry Nevel
13	(United States) Corey Deuel
21	(Philippines) Francisco Bustamante
21	(Russia) Evgeny Stalev
21	(United States) Dee Adkins
21	(United States) Josh O'Neal
21	(United States) Sergio Rivas
21	(Netherlands) Huidji See
21	(Germany) Thorsten Hohmann
21	(United States) Gus Briseno
21	(England) Darren Appleton
30	(United States) Justin Hall
30	(United States) Greg Hogue
30	(Philippines) Warren Kiamco
30	(United States) Jason Miller
30	(Scotland) Jayson Shaw
30	(United States) Jeremy Sossei
30	(United States) Earl Strickland
30	(United States) David Grossman
30	(United States) Chad Fairchild
30	(China) Wang Can
30	(United States) Benny Conway
30	(Philippines) Lee Vann Corteza
30	(United States) Shannon Daulton
30	(United States) Phil Davis
30	(United States) Duke Laha
30	(United States) Joe Dupuis
