= List of Efren Reyes championships =

Championships won by pool player

Efren Reyes is a professional pool player, who has won over 100 professional tournaments. Below is a list of all championships Reyes has won and his achievements.

== Titles and achievements ==
- 2026 Best in Billiards 250 years- Best One Pocket Player Award
- 2024 World Billiards Museum Hall of Fame
- 2021 Seniors One-Pocket Classic
- 2019 Philippine Sports Lifetime Achievement Award
- 2019 Junior Norris Memorial Nine-ball Shootout
- 2018 Asian Culture Day Lifetime Achievement Award
- 2018 Philippines vs. Chinese Taipei Challenge Match
- 2018 The Break Room Eight-ball Classic
- 2016 Accu-Stats One-Pocket Invitational
- 2015 Accu-Stats One-Pocket Invitational
- 2014 Manny Pacquiao Ten-ball Championship
- 2014 Smokin' Aces One-Pocket Shootout
- 2014 Derby City Classic One-Pocket
- 2013 Bergen Open Nine-ball
- 2012 Chuck Markulis Memorial One-Pocket
- 2011 Philippine Big Time Billiards Ten-ball
- 2011 World Mixed Doubles Classic - with (Rubilen Amit)
- 2011 CSI U.S. Open One-Pocket Championship
- 2010 Spanish Open Nine-ball
- 2010 Predator International Ten-Ball Championship
- 2010 Derby City Classic Master of the Table
- 2010 Derby City Classic Ten-Ball Challenge
- 2010 Derby City Classic Nine-Ball
- 2010 Asia vs. Europe Challenge Match
- 2010 Philippine Sports Hall of Fame
- 2010 U.S. Billiards Media Association Player of the Decade- 2000s
- 2009 World Mixed Doubles Classic - with (Rubilen Amit)
- 2009 World Cup of Pool - with (Francisco Bustamante)
- 2009 Galveston Classic One Pocket
- 2009 Fujiyama Open Nine-ball
- 2007 Derby City Classic Master of the Table
- 2007 Derby City Classic One-Pocket
- 2006 Time Magazine's 60 Asian heroes
- 2006 Philippine Sportsman of the Year
- 2006 Order of Lakandula Champion for Life Award
- 2006 IPT World Open Eight-ball Championship
- 2006 San Miguel Asian Nine-ball Tour (Indonesia Leg)
- 2006 San Miguel Asian Nine-ball Tour (Vietnam Leg)
- 2006 Derby City Classic One-Pocket
- 2006 World Cup of Pool - with (Francisco Bustamante)
- 2005 San Miguel Asian Nine-ball Tour (Indonesia Leg)
- 2005 Japan Open 9-Ball
- 2005 Derby City Classic Master of the Table
- 2005 IPT King of the Hill Eight-Ball Shootout
- 2005 Derby City Classic Nine-Ball
- 2005 Derby City Classic One-Pocket
- 2004 One Pocket Hall of Fame
- 2004 On Cue 3: Intercontinental Conquest
- 2004 World All Stars Invitational Team Cup
- 2004 San Miguel Asian Nine-ball Tour (Singapore Leg)
- 2004 San Miguel Asian Nine-ball Tour (Vietnam Leg)
- 2004 San Miguel Asian Nine-ball Tour (Taiwan Leg)
- 2004 WPA World Eight-ball Championship
- 2004 Derby City Classic Master of the Table
- 2004 Derby City Classic One-Pocket
- 2003 Billiard Congress of America Hall of Fame
- 2003 All Japan Championship Nine-ball
- 2003 Fujairah Classic Tournament
- 2003 Las Vegas Nine-ball Open
- 2003 San Miguel Asian Nine-ball Tour (Manila Leg)
- 2003 Mid-Atlantic Nine-ball Championship
- 2002 World Pool League
- 2002 Cafe Puro Challenge of the Masters
- 2002 Labor Day Open Nine-ball
- 2002 International Challenge of Champions
- 2001 Philippine Sportsman of the Year
- 2001 San Miguel Nine-ball Shootout
- 2001 World Pool League
- 2001 Tokyo Open Nine-ball
- 2001 Masters Nine-ball Championship
- 2001 Accu-Stats Eight-ball Invitational
- 2001 The Color of Money II vs. (Earl Strickland)
- 2000 U.S. Open One-Pocket Championship
- 2000 Camel Riviera Eight-ball Open
- 2000 Pennsylvania State Nine-ball Championship
- 2000 USA Billiards Challenger Event 2
- 1999 Philippine Legion of Honor
- 1999 The Outstanding Filipino Award
- 1999 Philippine Sportsman of the Year
- 1999 Southeast Asian Games Rotation Doubles
- 1999 Southeast Asian Games Rotation Singles
- 1999 WPA World Nine-ball Championship
- 1999 ESPN Ultimate 9-Ball Challenge
- 1999 ESPN Ultimate Champions Shootout
- 1999 All Japan Championship Nine-ball
- 1999 Sands Regency Nine-ball Open
- 1999 Derby City Classic Master of the Table
- 1999 Derby City Classic One-Pocket
- 1998 Camel South Jersey Ten-Ball Open
- 1997 PCA Shooters 9-Ball Open
- 1997 PCA Treasure Island Casino 9-Ball Open
- 1996 The Color of Money vs. (Earl Strickland)
- 1996 PBT Riviera Eight-ball Championship
- 1996 PBT Legends of Nine-ball Championship
- 1996 PBT Western Open Nine-ball Championship
- 1996 PBT Florida Flare Up III
- 1995 Billiards Digest Player of the Year
- 1995 Sands Regency Nine-ball Open
- 1995 PBT Riviera Eight-ball Championship
- 1995 PBT Pro Tour Nine-Ball Championship
- 1995 Maine 14.1 Championship
- 1995 Bicycle Club Nine-ball Invitational
- 1995 Battle of Champions Nine-ball
- 1994 Bicycle Club Nine-ball Invitational
- 1994 Billiard Cafe Nine-ball Open
- 1994 U.S. Open 9-Ball Championship
- 1993 PBT Riviera Team Championship
- 1992 Hard Times One-Pocket
- 1992 International Eight-ball Classic
- 1992 Huebler Cup Nine-ball Open
- 1992 Tokyo Open Nine-ball
- 1991 Southeast Asian Games Rotation Team
- 1991 Taipei Cup
- 1990 All Japan Championship Nine-ball
- 1989 Hokuriku Nine-ball Open
- 1988 McDermott Masters Nine-ball Championship
- 1987 Southeast Asian Games Snooker Doubles
- 1987 Southeast Asian Games Eight-ball Singles
- 1987 Southeast Asian Games English Billiards Singles
- 1987 Citrus Nine-ball Open
- 1987 Suncoast Nine-ball Open
- 1987 Cue Club Classic Nine-ball
- 1987 Q-Master Classic Nine-ball
- 1986 Sands Regency Nine-ball Open
- 1986 Bar Box Nine-ball Bash
- 1985 Sands Regency Nine-ball Open
- 1985 Billiard Cafe Nine-ball Open
- 1985 Tar Heel Nine-ball Open
- 1985 Willard's Nine-ball Open
- 1985 Billiards Digest 3-Cushion Consolation Event
- 1985 Houston Red's Nine-ball Open
- 1983 Philippine Rotation Championship
- 1979 Philippines-Japan Team Rotation Competition
- 1979 All Japan Championship Nine-ball
- 1978 Philippines-Japan Team Rotation Competition
- 1978 Philippine 3-Cushion Championship
