= All Japan Championship (pool) =

International pool tournament

The All Japan Championship is an annual international pool tournament founded by Kazuo Fujima in 1967, with an all-around tournament with multiple disciplines, in the men's division up until 1990. In the Men's tournament the current discipline is ten-ball, however the Women's tournament is played in the discipline of nine-ball. The All Japan Championship is currently sanctioned by the JPBA (Japan Professional Pocket Billiard Association). The first 20 years only held men's competitions. It was not until the 21st competition in 1988 that the women's event was established. Most of the competition period is after the middle of November each year. This is the most famous international large-scale pool event held in Japan, and the oldest tournament in pool that is still held. Takeshi Okumura had won the men's tournament the most times, having won thirteen times pre 1991, when the tournament was multiple divisions. Takeshi Okumura and Ko Pin-yi have won the men's tournament the most times, three, post 1990 in the single discipline modern format. Akimi Kajitani has won the women's tournament the most times, four.

== Tournament history ==
=== Men ===
Year	Winner	Runner-up	Discipline
1991	(Japan) Junichi Kosugi	(Philippines) Efren Reyes	Nine-ball
1992	(Japan) Akikumo Toshikawa	(Philippines) Antonio Lining	Nine-ball
1993	(Japan) Takeshi Okumura	(Japan) Akikumo Toshikawa	Nine-ball
1994	(Chinese Taipei) Chang Hao-Ping	(Japan) Takeshi Okumura	Nine-ball
1995	(Japan) Takeshi Okumura (2)	(Japan) Shuji Nagata	Nine-ball
1996	(Chinese Taipei) Yang Ching-shun	(Philippines) Francisco Bustamante	Nine-ball
1997	(Japan) Kunihiko Takahashi	(United States) C.J. Wiley	Nine-ball
1998	(Chinese Taipei) Chang Hao-Ping (2)	(Japan) Takeshi Okumura	Nine-ball
1999	(Philippines) Efren Reyes	(Philippines) Antonio Lining	Nine-ball
2000	(Philippines) Antonio Lining	(Chinese Taipei) Chao Fong-pang	Nine-ball
2001	(United States) Corey Deuel	(Finland) Mika Immonen	Nine-ball
2002	(Philippines) Francisco Bustamante	(Finland) Mika Immonen	Nine-ball
2003	(Philippines) Efren Reyes (2)	(Japan) Tasuku Nishio	Nine-ball
2004	(Germany) Ralf Souquet	(Finland) Mika Immonen	Nine-ball
2005	(Japan) Takeshi Okumura (3)	(Finland) Mika Immonen	Nine-ball
2006	(Philippines) Lee Vann Corteza	(Chinese Taipei) Chang Pei-Wei	Nine-ball
2007	(Chinese Taipei) Wu Jia-qing	(Japan) Toru Kuribayashi	Nine-ball
2008	(Finland) Mika Immonen	(Philippines) Ronato Alcano	Nine-ball
2009	(Philippines) Francisco Bustamante (2)	(Philippines) Antonio Lining	Nine-ball
2010	(Germany) Thorsten Hohmann	(Chinese Taipei) Ko Ping-chung	Nine-ball
2011	(Chinese Taipei) Ko Pin-yi	(China) Wu Jia-qing	Ten-ball
2012	(Chinese Taipei) Chang Jung-lin	(Chinese Taipei) Yang Ching-shun	Ten-ball
2013	(Chinese Taipei) Ko Pin-yi (2)	(Chinese Taipei) Chang Jung-lin	Ten-ball
2014	(Philippines) Raymund Faraon	(Japan) Naoyuki Ōi	Ten-ball
2015	(Philippines) Johann Chua	(Philippines) Ronato Alcano	Ten-ball
2016	(Chinese Taipei) Ko Pin-yi (3)	(Philippines) Jeffrey de Luna	Ten-ball
2017	(Philippines) Johann Chua (2)	(Philippines) Jundel Mazon	Ten-ball
2018	(Japan) Tomoo Takano	(Japan) Toru Kuribayashi	Ten-ball
2019	(China) Zheng Xiaohui	(China) Dang Jinhu	Ten-ball
2023	(Chinese Taipei) Lu Hui-Chan	(Japan) Hayato Hijikata	Ten-ball
2024	(Chinese Taipei) Wu Kun-lin	(Philippines) Jundel Mazon	Ten-ball
2025	(Philippines) Kyle Amoroto	(Philippines) Johann Chua	Ten-ball

=== Top Performers ===
Name	Nationality	Winner	Runner-up	Finals
Takeshi Okumura	Japan	3	2	5
Ko Pin-yi	Chinese Taipei	3	0	3
Johann Chua	Philippines	2	1	3
Efren Reyes	Philippines	2	1	3
Francisco Bustamante	Philippines	2	1	3
Chang Hao-Ping	Chinese Taipei	2	0	2

- Active participants are shown in **bold**.
- In the event of identical records, players are sorted in alphabetical order by first name.

=== Women ===
Year	Winner	Runner-up	Discipline
1988	(Japan) Mieko Harada	(Japan) Kazuko Shimizu	Nine-ball
1989	(China) Zhu Yukuri	(Japan) Kiyoko Sano	Nine-ball
1990	(United States) LoreeJon Jones	(Japan) Yoko Miura	Nine-ball
1991	(Japan) Mieko Harada (2)	(China) Zhu Yukuri	Nine-ball
1992	(Japan) Akimi Kajitani	(Japan) Mieko Harada	Nine-ball
1993	(Chinese Taipei) Jennifer Chen	(Japan) Yoko Miura	Nine-ball
1994	(Japan) Makiko Takagi	(China) Zhu Yukuri	Nine-ball
1995	(China) Zhu Yukuri (2)	(Japan) Yoko kamimura	Nine-ball
1996	(England) Allison Fisher	(Chinese Taipei) Liu Shin-mei	Nine-ball
1997	(Chinese Taipei) Jennifer Chen (2)	(United States) Irene Pippin	Nine-ball
1998	(Chinese Taipei) Liu Shin-mei	(Japan) Makiko Takagi	Nine-ball
1999	(Japan) Akimi Kajitani (2)	(Chinese Taipei) Jennifer Chen	Nine-ball
2000	(Northern Ireland) Karen Corr	(England) Allison Fisher	Nine-ball
2001	(Chinese Taipei) Liu Shin-mei (2)	(England) Allison Fisher	Nine-ball
2002	(China) Pan Xiaoting	(Japan) Sakiki Namiki	Nine-ball
2003	(Chinese Taipei) Liu Shin-mei (3)	(South Korea) Jung Sung-hyun	Nine-ball
2004	(Japan) Akimi Kajitani (3)	(Chinese Taipei) Lin Yuan-chun	Nine-ball
2005	(China) Pan Xiaoting (2)	(Japan) Makiko Takagi	Nine-ball
2006	(Chinese Taipei) Lin Yuan-chun	(Austria) Jasmin Ouschan	Nine-ball
2007	(Chinese Taipei) Chang Shu-han	(Japan) Akio Otani	Nine-ball
2008	(China) Pan Xiaoting (3)	(Chinese Taipei) Chou Chieh-yu	Nine-ball
2009	(China) Han Yu	(South Korea) Lim Yun-Mi	Nine-ball
2010	(Chinese Taipei) Lin Hsiao-chi	(Japan) Keiko Yukawa	Nine-ball
2011	(China) Chen Siming	(Japan) Junko Mitsuoka	Nine-ball
2012	(Chinese Taipei) Chou Chieh-yu	(Chinese Taipei) Tan Ho-yun	Nine-ball
2013	(Japan) Akimi Kajitani (4)	(Japan) Chihiro Kawahara	Nine-ball
2014	(Chinese Taipei) Wu Zhi-Ting	(China) Liu Shasha	Nine-ball
2015	(South Korea) Kim Ga-young	(Japan) Chihiro Kawahara	Nine-ball
2016	(Chinese Taipei) Ho Yun-chen	(Japan) Chihiro Kawahara	Nine-ball
2017	(China) Chen Siming (2)	(Japan) Miyuki Kuribayashi	Nine-ball
2018	(China) Shi Tianqi	(South Korea) Lim Yun-mi	Nine-ball
2019	(China) Han Yu (2)	(China) Chen Siming	Nine-ball
2023	(Japan) Yuki Hiraguchi	(Japan) Chihiro Kawahara	Nine-ball
2024	(South Korea) Seo Seoa	(China) Wang Xiaotong	Nine-ball
2025	(Japan) Samia Konishi	(Chinese Taipei) Hsieh Yu Wen	Nine-ball

=== Top Performers ===
Name	Nationality	Winner	Runner-up	Finals
**Akimi Kajitani**	Japan	4	0	4
**Liu Shin-mei**	Chinese Taipei	3	1	4
Pan Xiaoting	China	3	0	3
Zhu Yukuri	China	2	2	4
Chen Siming	China	2	1	3
Jennifer Chen	Chinese Taipei	2	1	3
Mieko Harada	Japan	2	1	3
**Han Yu**	China	2	0	2

- Active participants are shown in **bold**.
- In the event of identical records, players are sorted in alphabetical order by first name.

== Japan Open ==
In addition to the All Japan Championship another tournament known as the Japan Open played in the discipline of Nine-ball for men and women. However, from 2011 to present, the men's tournament was played in the discipline of Ten-ball. The event began in 1988 and the year after for women and the event has continued for over 30 years. Takeshi Okumura is the most successful player having won the tournament four times. Akimi Kajitani is the most successful player having won the women's tournament the most times, three.

=== Men ===
Year	Winner	Runner-up	Discipline
1988	(Japan) Takeshi Okumura	(Japan) Hideo Shiraishi	Nine-ball
1989	(Chinese Taipei) Zhang Xiao-yuan	(Philippines) Jose Parica	Nine-ball
1990	(Mexico) Ismael Páez	(Mexico) Ernesto Dominguez	Nine-ball
1991	(Japan) Syuji Nagata	(Japan) Akikumo Toshikawa	Nine-ball
1992	(Philippines) Francisco Bustamante	(Japan) Tomoki Mekari	Nine-ball
1993	(Japan) Akikumo Toshikawa	(Japan) Masao Tachibana	Nine-ball
1994	(Japan) Takeshi Okumura (2)	(Japan) Akikumo Toshikawa	Nine-ball
1995	(Japan) Takeshi Okumura (3)	(Japan) Yoshihiro Kitatani	Nine-ball
1996	(Japan) Kunihiko Takahashi	(Japan) Syuji Nagata	Nine-ball
1997	(Philippines) Roel Esquillo	(Japan) Akikumo Toshikawa	Nine-ball
1998	(Philippines) Elvis Perez	(Japan) Hisanao Kataoka	Nine-ball
1999	(Japan) Takeshi Okumura (4)	(Japan) Akikumo Toshikawa	Nine-ball
2000	(Japan) Satoshi Kawabata	(United States) Johnny Archer	Nine-ball
2001	(Japan) Mitsuaki Itsuno	(Chinese Taipei) Chao Fong-pang	Nine-ball
2002	(Philippines) Francisco Bustamante (2)	(Germany) Ralf Souquet	Nine-ball
2003	(Japan) Daisaku Nishijima	(Philippines) Ramil Gallego	Nine-ball
2004	(Chinese Taipei) Xia Wei-kui	(Philippines) Rodolfo Luat	Nine-ball
2005	(Philippines) Efren Reyes	(Philippines) Rodolfo Luat	Nine-ball
2006	(Philippines) Antonio Lining	(Philippines) Dante Rasalan	Nine-ball
2007	(Philippines) Alex Pagulayan	(Chinese Taipei) Lo Li-wen	Nine-ball
2008	(Philippines) Dennis Orcollo	(Japan) Ryoji Aoki	Nine-ball
2009	(Philippines) Ramil Gallego	(Chinese Taipei) Lo Li-wen	Nine-ball
2010	(Philippines) Francisco Bustamante (3)	(Philippines) Efren Reyes	Nine-ball
2011	(Chinese Taipei) Chang Jung-lin	(Philippines) Efren Reyes	Ten-ball
2012	(Philippines) Warren Kiamco	(Japan) Satoshi Kawabata	Ten-ball
2013	(Japan) Hayato Hijikata	(Philippines) Lee Vann Corteza	Ten-ball
2014	(Philippines) Antonio Lining (2)	(United States) Rodney Morris	Ten-ball
2015	(Philippines) Carlo Biado	(Japan) Toru Kuribayashi	Ten-ball
2016	(Japan) Hayato Hijikata (2)	(Japan) Toru Kuribayashi	Ten-ball
2017	(Chinese Taipei) Chang Jung-lin (2)	(Japan) Naoyuki Ōi	Ten-ball
2018	(Philippines) Lee Vann Corteza	(Japan) Naoyuki Ōi	Ten-ball
2019	(Japan) Naoyuki Ōi	(Japan) Norio Ogawa	Ten-ball
2022	(Japan) Tomoya Iima	(Japan) Kenichi Uchigaki	Ten-ball
2023	(Japan) Tomoya Iima (2)	(Philippines) Dennis Orcollo	Ten-ball
2024	(Philippines) Jeffrey Ignacio	(Chinese Taipei) Tsung Han-lin	Ten-ball
2025	(Japan) Komiya Shounosuke	(Japan) Nakano Masayuki	Ten-ball

=== Top Performers ===
Name	Nationality	Winner	Runner-up	Finals
Takeshi Okumura	Japan	4	0	1
Francisco Bustamante	Philippines	3	0	3
**Antonio Lining**	Philippines	2	0	2
Chang Jung-lin	Chinese Taipei	2	0	2
**Hayato Hijikata**	Japan	2	0	2
**Tomoya Iima**	Japan	2	0	2

- Active participants are shown in **bold**.
- In the event of identical records, players are sorted in alphabetical order by first name.

=== Women ===
Year	Winner	Runner-up	Discipline
1989	(Japan) Yoko Miura	(Japan) Iso Masako	Nine-ball
1990	(Japan) Shigemi Watanabe	(Japan) Yukiko Sada	Nine-ball
1991	(Japan) Rie Oriuchi	(Japan) Kiyoko Sano	Nine-ball
1992	(Japan) Mieko Harada	(Japan) Setsuko Kubota	Nine-ball
1993	(Japan) Makiko Takagi	(Japan) Keitko Nishimura	Nine-ball
1994	(Japan) Makiko Takagi (2)	(Japan) Keitko Nishimura	Nine-ball
1995	(Japan) Yoko Miura (2)	(Japan) Setsuko Kubota	Nine-ball
1996	(Japan) Yoko Miura (3)	(Japan) Setsuko Kubota	Nine-ball
1997	(Japan) Akimi Kajitani	(Japan) Makiko Takagi	Nine-ball
1998	(Japan) Kyoko Sone	(Japan) Mika Muneta	Nine-ball
1999	(Japan) Akimi Kajitani (2)	(Japan) Kimiko Yamauchi	Nine-ball
2000	(Japan) Akimi Kajitani (3)	(Japan) Kyoko Sone	Nine-ball
2001	(Japan) Akimi Kajitani (4)	(Japan) Kyoko Sone	Nine-ball
2002	(Japan) Keiko Yukawa	(Japan) Teruko Sekikawa	Nine-ball
2003	(Japan) Makiko Takagi (3)	(Japan) Yukiko Hamanishi	Nine-ball
2004	(Chinese Taipei) Kao Shi-Pin	(Chinese Taipei) Chang Shu-Han	Nine-ball
2005	(China) Zhou Meng-Meng	(Japan) Miyuki Kuribayashi	Nine-ball
2006	(Chinese Taipei) Su Yi-Yun	(Japan) Yukiko Hamanishi	Nine-ball
2007	(Japan) Miyuki Kuribayashi	(Japan) Chihiro Kawahara	Nine-ball
2008	(Japan) Miyuki Kuribayashi (2)	(Japan) Akimi Kajitani	Nine-ball
2009	(Chinese Taipei) Tan Ho-yun	(Japan) Keiko Yukawa	Nine-ball
2010	(Chinese Taipei) Chou Chieh-Yu	(China) Jia Li	Nine-ball
2011	(Chinese Taipei) Wei Tzu-Chien	(Japan) Chihiro Kawahara	Nine-ball
2012	(Japan) Akimi Kajitani (5)	(Japan) Chihiro Kawahara	Nine-ball
2013	(Japan) Chihiro Kawahara	(Chinese Taipei) Tsai Pei-Chun	Nine-ball
2014	(Chinese Taipei) Wu Zhi-Ting	(China) Jia Li	Nine-ball
2015	(Japan) Chihiro Kawahara (2)	(Japan) Kyoko Sone	Nine-ball
2016	(Japan) Miyuki Kuribayashi (3)	(Chinese Taipei) Amber Chen	Nine-ball
2017	(Chinese Taipei) Fan Yu-Hsuan	(Japan) Yuki Hiraguchi	Nine-ball
2018	(Chinese Taipei) Kuo Szu-Ting	(Japan) Akimi Kajitani	Nine-ball
2019	(Chinese Taipei) Amber Chen	(Philippines) Rubilen Amit	Nine-ball
2022	(Japan) Asako Satou	(Japan) Yuki Hiraguchi	Nine-ball
2023	(Japan) Tomoe Aoki	(Japan) Akimi Kajitani	Nine-ball
2024	(Chinese Taipei) Wang Wan-Ling	(Chinese Taipei) Liu Shin-mei	Nine-ball
2025	(Japan) Chie Aoki	(Chinese Taipei) Chen Chia-Hua	Nine-ball

=== Top Performers ===
Name	Nationality	Winner	Runner-up	Finals
**Akimi Kajitani**	Japan	5	3	8
**Makiko Takagi**	Japan	3	1	4
**Miyuki Kuribayashi**	Japan	3	1	4
Yoko Miura	Japan	3	0	3
**Chihiro Kawahara**	Japan	2	3	5

- Active participants are shown in **bold**.
- In the event of identical records, players are sorted in alphabetical order by first name.
