= Alex Pagulayan =

Filipino-Canadian pool player (born 1978)

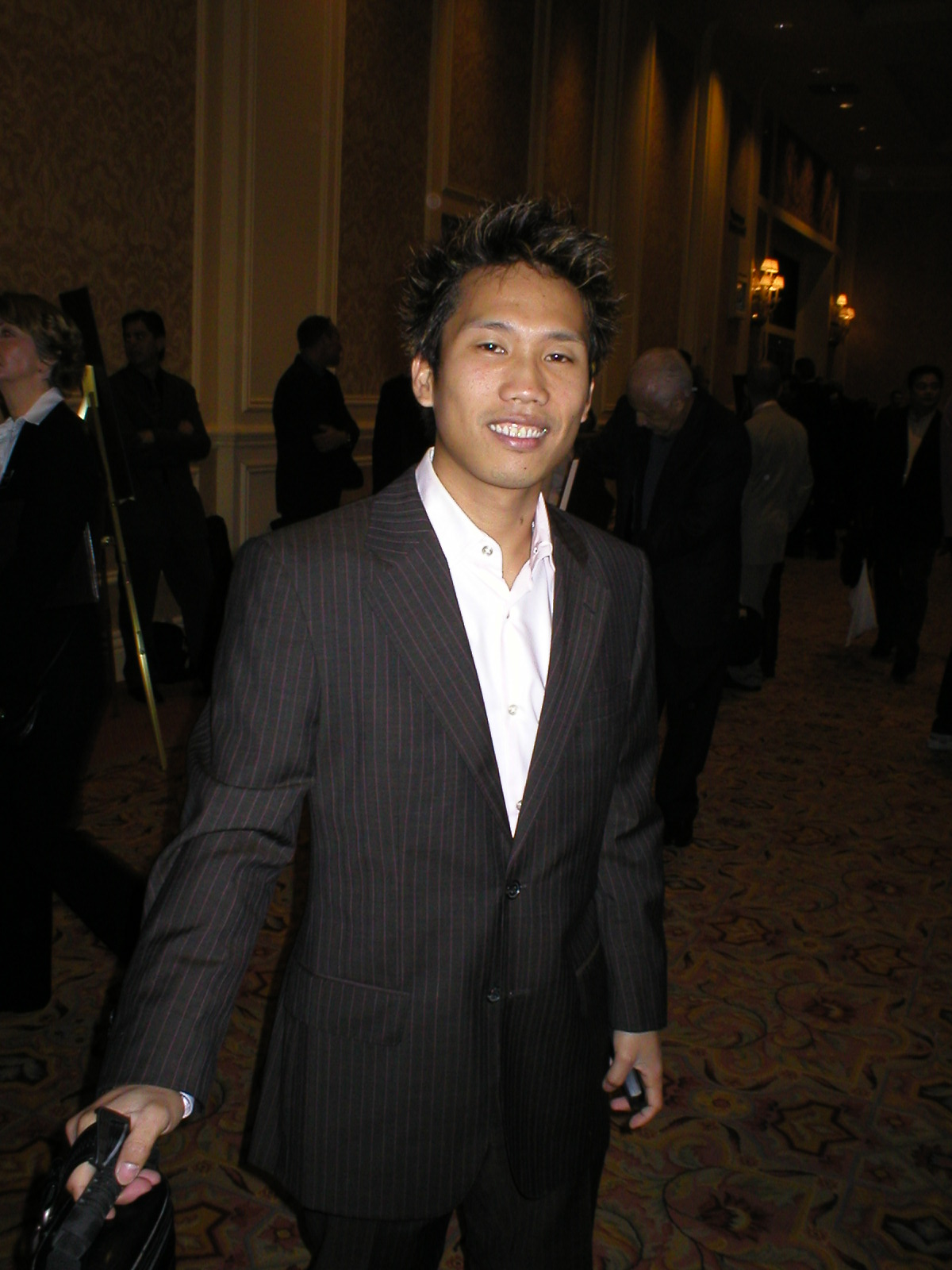
- Alex Pagulayan at IPT North American Open in Las Vegas, July 2006

Personal information
- Nickname: "The Lion"
- Born: June 25, 1978 (age 48) Cabagan, Isabela, Philippines

Pool career
- Country: Canada (before 2005; 2012–present); Philippines (2005–2012)
- Turned pro: 1998
- Pool games: Nine-ball, One-pocket, Ten-ball, Eight-ball, Banks

Tournament wins
- Major: U.S. Open Pool Championship (2006)
- World Champion: 9-Ball (2004)
- Highest rank: 1
Medal record
Representing Philippines
Men's Eight-ball
SEA Games
Gold medal – first place	2005 Manila	Singles
Men's Nine-ball
SEA Games
Gold medal – first place	2005 Manila	Doubles
Men's Snooker
SEA Games
Gold medal – first place	2005 Manila	Team

Alejandro Salvador "Alex" Pagulayan (born June 25, 1978) is a Filipino and Canadian professional pool player. His nickname is "the Lion", given to him by Paul Thornley, the Canadian snooker player whom he credits as his mentor. Pagulayan was voted as one of the best pool players of all time by readers of AZBilliards.com. He is also a renowned one-pocket player.

He was born in Cabagan, Isabela, Philippines and was raised in Toronto, Canada. Pagulayan represents Canada internationally. However, he competed for the Philippines from the mid-2000s to 2012, when he began representing Canada again.

Pagulayan is known for his relaxed and humorous demeanor during competition, interacting with the audience and performing impressions of other players.

== Early life ==
Alejandro Salvador Pagulayan was born on June 25, 1978, in the town of Cabagan in Isabela, Philippines to Remigio Pagulayan and Sonia Salvador. He emigrated to Canada when he was 16 years old. Pagulayan lost his Philippine citizenship when his family applied for naturalization.

His father managed a pool hall, so Pagulayan was introduced to the game at an early age. Though he was also attracted to other sports, he thought his physique may have been unsuitable for them. His main training venue was Loma's pool hall.

== Professional career ==
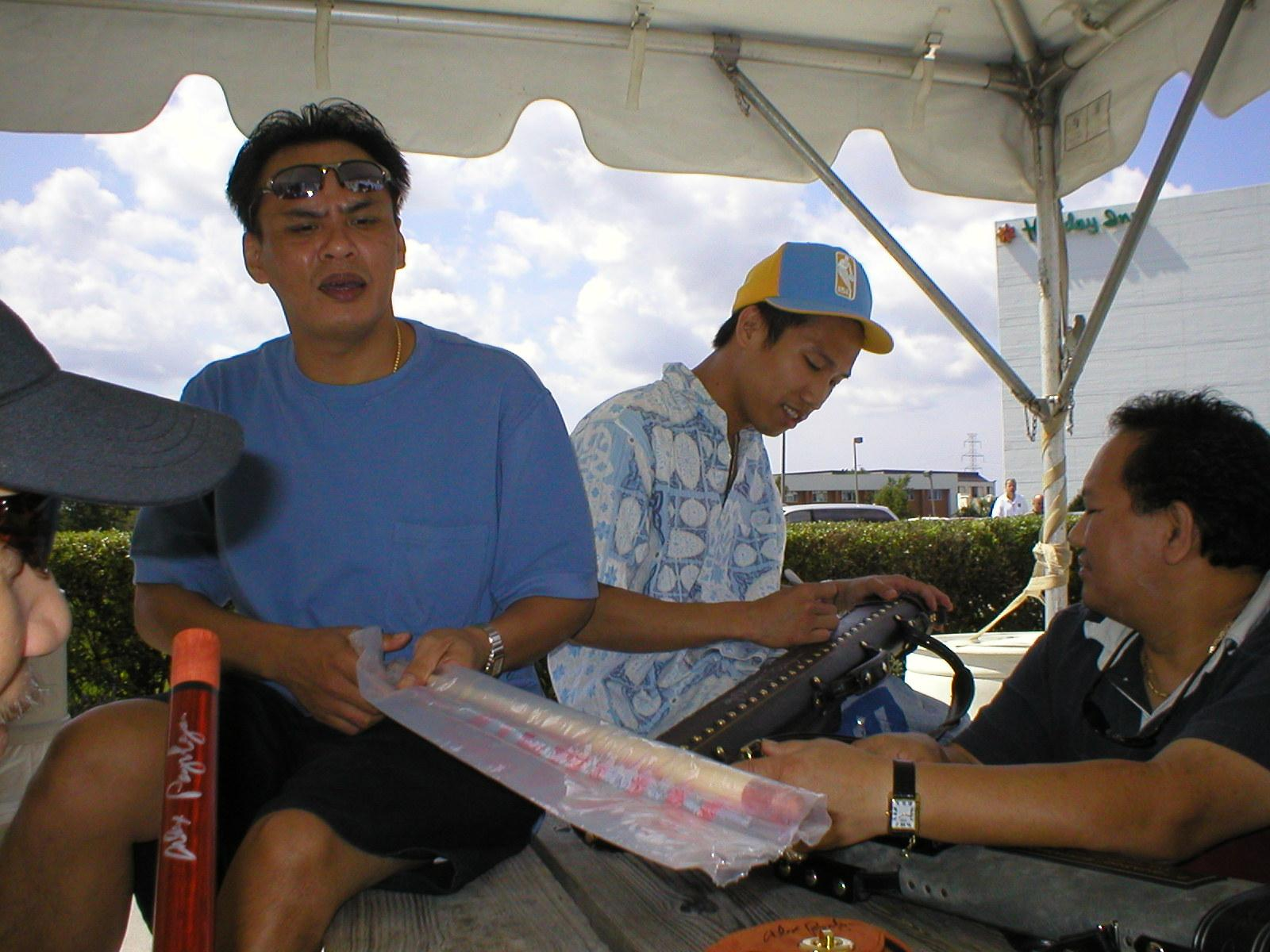
Pagulayan (center) and Francisco Bustamante (left) at the 2004 US Open Nine-ball Championship signing autographs

In the first rack of the semi-finals at the 2004 BCA Open Nine-ball Championship, Pagulayan sank six balls on the break — two-thirds of the entire rack. Pagulayan's break did not include the 9 ball, and he lost that game to Santos Sambajon.

In 2002, Pagulayan won through to the finals of the US Open Nine-ball Championship, but was defeated by Ralf Souquet, 11–13. Three years later, he had another good run the US Open Nine-ball Championship title and won it, defeating Jose Parica in the finals, 11–6.

In 2003, Pagulayan went on the road in the United States with Canadian pool player Ronnie Wiseman to compete in pocket billiard tournaments. They scored a double victory at the Carolinas Open at Fast Eddie's in Goldsboro, North Carolina, with Wiseman winning the one-pocket tournament and Pagulayan winning the nine-ball event. Later in 2003, Pagulayan reached the finals of the World Nine-ball Championship but was beaten by Thorsten Hohmann 10–17.

Representing Canada, Pagulayan captured the 2004 WPA World Nine-ball Championship in Taipei, Taiwan. The score was a 17–13 victory over Pei-wei Chang in the final. After the win, Pagulayan, has applied to reacquire his Philippine citizenship so he could represent his country of birth internationally.

Pagulayan has experience in the game of snooker other than Pool, helping the Filipino team to win the Snooker Gold Medal at the 2005 SEA Games (held in Manila, Philippines) with teammates Joven Alba and Leonardo Andam. After the team's 3–2 win against Thailand at the Makati Coliseum, Pagulayan emerged as a triple gold medalist.

In 2006, Pagulayan won the first national championship of the Billiards and Snooker Congress of Philippines (BSCP), besting Gandy Valle in the final and earning P1,000,000 (US$20,639).

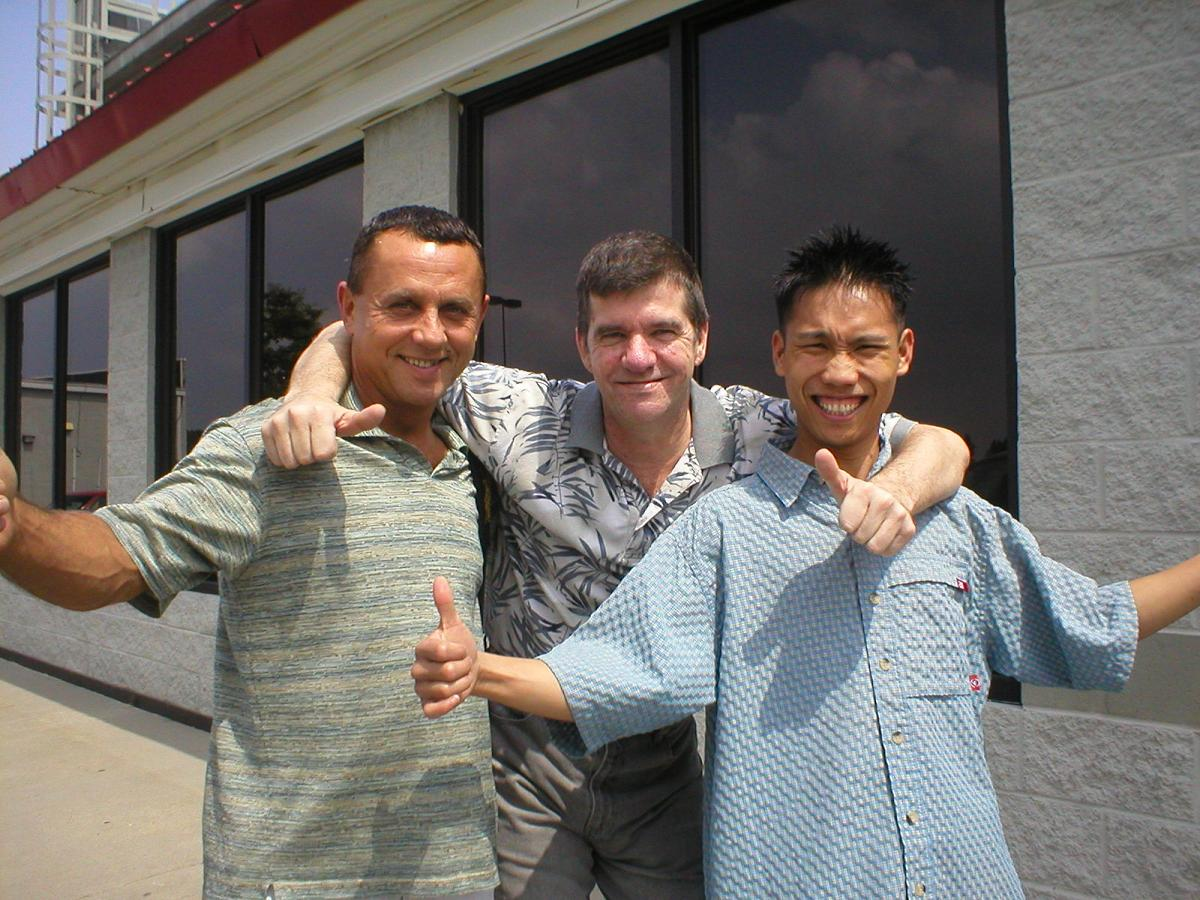
Ronnie Wiseman, Keith McCready, and Pagulayan (left to right) at the 2003 Carolinas Open in Goldsboro, North Carolina

Few pool players in the Philippines play straight pool. For a number of years, Jose Parica and Efren Reyes were the only known Filipino players to have made a run of 100 or more. At a demonstration match at the 2006 Derby City Classic in Kentucky, Pagulayan made a high run of 130, the second-highest of the event. This made him the third known Filipino player to have made a run of 100 balls in straight pool competition.

In 2007, Pagulayan won the World Summit of Pool nine-ball championship held at the Riviera Casino in Las Vegas, Nevada. American Shane Van Boening defeated Pagulayan earlier in the event, 11–4, but the veteran Pagulayan came back from the losing bracket of the double-elimination tournament chart by beating fellow countrymen Francisco Bustamante and Warren Kiamco, only to face Van Boening in the final round. The final match between Pagulayan and Van Boening was a race to 7. Pagulayan shot out with a strong lead, 4–1, but Van Boening managed to tie the score at 5–5. However, after Pagulayan three-fouled him, resulting in a loss of game for Van Boening, Pagulayan advanced and captured the title in the final game, ending the match at 7–5.

On May 11, 2008, Pagulayan defeated Mika Immonen in the Matchroom Sports production of the World Pool Masters in a final held at the Rivera Hotel and Casino in Las Vegas, Nevada. In the race to 8, Immonen maintained a strong lead against Pagulayan with a score of 6 to 3, but due to an illegal break when he failed to send the required number of balls past the headstring, Pagulayan took advantage of this error by winning the next three games in a row, with the eventual title going to Pagulayan. "I feel like I did when I won the World Championship," said Pagulayan. "I think I've finished in every place here except first," he said. Pagulayan was a finalist in the 2006 World Pool Masters, but lost to German Ralf Souquet.

Pagulayan beat Joven Bustamante on June 15, 2008, to win the P 300,000-Magnificent 7 Winner-Take-All 9-Ball Invitational second qualifier in Mandaue City, Cebu for the December grand final. He was set for the June, 2nd leg of the Sen. Manuel Villar Cup in Cebu City.

Alex Pagulayan, 30, received the $15,000 check, as he defeated Dennis Orcollo, 11–6, to win the 4th leg of the Guinness 9-Ball Tour at the Velocity at Novena Square, Singapore. Pagulayan beat the 2005 world title winner, Wu Chia Ching, 9–6, while Orcollo defeated Yang Ching-Shun, 9–8. Orcollo settled for the runner-up purse of $6,000.

In 2011, Alex Pagulayan defeated Floyd Ziegler 6–0 to win the final of the 2011 Canadian Amateur Championship, in his return to competitive snooker, he successfully defended the title in 2012.

In 2014, Pagulayan entered the Snooker Q School to qualify for main tour events. He participated in qualifying for the 2014 Wuxi Classic, but lost his match to world number 14 Stephen Maguire. Days later he took part in the qualifying for the next ranking event on the Snooker tour, the Australian Goldfields Open, but lost the first qualifying round 5–1 to Ian Burns. In qualifying for the next ranking event, the Shanghai Masters, he lost to John Astley.

In 2016, Pagulayan was crowned champion of the 2016 Canadian 9-Ball Championship held in Quebec, Canada after he tumbled John Morra in the championship match, 15–6. Pagulayan would remain undefeated in all of his matches, including a semi-finals victory over Alain Martel in the tournament.

He also won the 2017 CSI U.S. Open 8-Ball Championship against Shane Van Boening.

=== Lawsuit ===
Pagulayan filed a libel case against two pool officials with the Pasig Regional Trial Court on July 14, 2008, seeking 6 million Philippine pesos in damages. He sued Yen Makabenta and Ernesto Fajardo, the officials of the Billiards and Snookers Congress of the Philippines (BSCP), who had accused him of "sharking" (distracting his opponent to win, at the Singapore leg Guinness 9-Ball Tour), in addition to being a "disgraceful loser" and a "liar". Pagulayan alleged that this is retaliation for his refusal to appear in a television production without monetary compensation.

=== Return to Canada ===
In 2012 Pagulayan began representing Canada in international competitions. His agent reportedly said during the 2012 World Cup of Pool that Pagulayan encountered fewer "political obstacles" in representing Canada while the pool player himself said that he switched to representing Canada due to competition with other Filipino players. He made the move to continue his professional career, which he stated was his livelihood. At the 2012 World Cup of Pool, he, along with partner John Morra, finished in the Round of 16, and was eliminated by Filipino pair Francisco Bustamante and Efren Reyes.

== Personal life ==
Pagulayan is a dual citizen of Canada and the Philippines. He acquired Canadian citizenship after his family emigrated to Canada in his youth and consequentially lost his Philippine citizenship. He reacquired his status as a natural-born Filipino citizen in 2004, taking advantage of Republic Act No. 9225 of 2003. Pagulayan has a daughter with Phoebe Choy.

== Titles and achievements ==
- 2025 One Pocket Hall of fame
- 2022 Scotty Townsend Memorial One Pocket
- 2022 Scotty Townsend Memorial Open 9-Ball
- 2021 Midwest Billiards Expo 10-Ball
- 2020 Aramith / Simonis Pro Classic 10-Ball
- 2020 Aramith / Simonis Pro Classic One Pocket
- 2019 Billiard Congress of America Hall of Fame
- 2019 Buffalo's Pro Classic One Pocket
- 2019 Music City Open 9-Ball
- 2019 Texas 10-Ball Championship
- 2019 Scotty Townsend Memorial 9-Ball
- 2019 Scotty Townsend Memorial One Pocket
- 2018 Midwest Billiards Expo One Pocket
- 2018 Scotty Townsend Memorial One Pocket
- 2018 Sparkle City 10-Ball Open
- 2018 Sparkle City One-Pocket Open
- 2018 Canadian 10-Ball Championship
- 2018 Canadian 9-Ball Championship
- 2017 Carom Room Fall Classic 10-Ball
- 2017 CSI U.S. Open 8-ball Championship
- 2017 Midwest Billiards Expo Banks Ring Game
- 2016 Midwest Billiards Expo One Pocket
- 2016 Archer Cup 10-Ball
- 2016 Canadian 9-Ball Championship
- 2016 CSI U.S. Open One Pocket Championship
- 2016 Derby City Classic Master of the Table
- 2016 Derby City Classic One Pocket
- 2015 Derby City Classic Master of the Table
- 2015 Derby City Classic One Pocket
- 2015 Buffalo's Pro Classic One Pocket
- 2015 Big Tyme Classic Open 9-Ball
- 2015 Big Tyme Classic Open One Pocket
- 2014 Big Tyme Classic Open 9-Ball
- 2013 Derby City Classic 9-Ball
- 2013 Southern Classic Bank Pool
- 2012 Southern Classic 9-Ball
- 2012 Southern Classic Bigfoot 10-Ball Challenge
- 2012 Accu-Stats Bigfoot 8-Ball Invitational
- 2012 Canadian 9-Ball Championship
- 2012 Canadian 8-Ball Championship
- 2012 Jay Swanson Memorial 9-Ball
- 2012 Kansai 10-Ball Open
- 2012 Canadian Amateur Snooker Championship
- 2011 Canadian Amateur Snooker Championship
- 2011 Jay Swanson Memorial 9-Ball
- 2011 CSI US Bar Table 10-Ball Championship
- 2011 California One Pocket Challenge
- 2011 Hard Times 10-Ball Open
- 2011 Derby City Classic Bank Pool
- 2008 World Pool Masters
- 2008 Guinness Asian 9-Ball Tour (Singapore Leg)
- 2008 Winner-Take-All 9-Ball Invitational
- 2007 Japan Open 9-Ball
- 2007 Oriental International 9-Ball Championship
- 2007 U.S. Professional Association Summit of Pool
- 2007 Canadian 9-Ball Tour
- 2006 BSCP Philippine National Pool Championship
- 2006 Canadian 9-Ball Tour
- 2005 U.S. Open 9-Ball Championship
- 2005 Derby City Classic Ten-ball Ring Game
- 2005 SML Entertainment Nine-ball Championship
- 2005 Southeast Asian Games Eight-ball Singles
- 2005 Southeast Asian Games Snooker Team
- 2005 Southeast Asian Games Nine-ball Doubles
- 2004 WPA World Nine-ball Championship
- 2004 World All Stars Invitational Team Cup
- 2003 Derby City Classic Louie Roberts Award
- 2003 Joss Tour Grand Final
- 2003 Carolinas Open Nine-ball
- 2003 Canadian 9-Ball Championship
- 2003 IBC Tour 9-Ball Championship
- 2002 World Pool Masters Trick Shot Challenge
- 2001 Joss Northeast Tour
- 2001 Canadian 9-Ball Championship
- 2000 Molson Cup 10-Ball Championship
- 1999 Sands Regency 9-Ball Open
