= Rodney Morris =

American pool player (b. 1970)

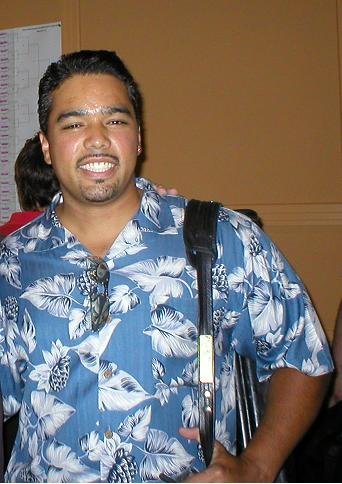
- Morris c. 2007

Personal information
- Nickname: "The Rocket"
- Born: November 25, 1970 (age 55) Anaheim, California, U.S.

Pool career
- Country: United States
- Turned pro: 1993
- Pool games: Nine-ball, ten-ball, eight-ball
- Best finish: Semi-finals, 2005 WPA World Nine-ball Championship

Tournament wins
- Major: 1996 U.S. Open Nine-ball Championship; 2003 World Pool League; 2006 UPA Pro Tour Championship; 2013 U.S. Open Ten-ball Championship
- Other titles: Doubles: 2008 World Cup of Pool (with Shane Van Boening); Team: 2003, 2004 (MVP), 2005 Mosconi Cup (with Team USA)
Medal record
World Games
Bronze medal – third place	2005 Duisburg	Individual

Rodney Morris (born November 25, 1970, in Anaheim, California) is a professional pool player, nicknamed "the Rocket". In 2016, he was inducted into the Billiard Congress of America Hall of Fame. Morris won the 1996 U.S. Open Nine-ball Championship, 2003 World Pool League, 2006 UPA Pro Tour Championship (nine-ball), and 2013 U.S. Open Ten-ball Championship, among many other individual titles. In doubles play, he and Shane Van Boening took the 2008 World Cup of Pool. He has also been a member of the winning Team USA in the Mosconi Cup events of 2003–2005, and was the Mosconi Cup MVP in 2004.

== Career ==
In 1996, Morris won his first major tournament by defeating Efren Reyes in the finals of the U.S. Open Nine-ball Championship. In 2001, after five years of not playing in a professional tournament, Morris came back to win the Sands Regency Nine-ball Open. In 2003, he won the World Pool League nine-ball tournament, besting Thorsten Hohmann, the reigning world champion.

He has represented Team USA in the Mosconi Cup on eight occasions, including the team's 2003, 2004, and 2005 victories against Team Europe in this annual nine-ball match. He received the Mosconi Cup's Most Valuable Player award in 2004.

As a member of the International Pool Tour (IPT), in July 2006 he was runner-up to Efren Reyes in the inaugural IPT World Open Eight-ball Championship which was held in Reno, Nevada. While Reyes earned $500K for first place, Morris won $150K for second. Morris did take the 2006 United Pool Players Association (UPA) Pro Tour Championship in nine-ball.

In July 2007, Morris was designated as the Lead Player Representative of UPA (now United States Professional Poolplayers Association), the men's governing body of professional pool in the United States.

In 2008, Rodney and Shane Van Boening won the World Cup of Pool doubles nine-ball event in Rotterdam, Netherlands.

While Morris's career has been dominated by nine-ball competition, he has also been professionally active in ten-ball, and won the 2007 Steve Mizerak Ten-ball Championship, and 2013 U.S. Open Ten-ball Championship, among other events in the discipline. His eight-ball work has been less frequent, but includes a co-win in the 2010 Poison Doubles Eight-ball Championship.

Morris was honored with induction into the Billiard Congress of America Hall of Fame in 2016.

== Personal life ==
Morris is of Chamorro–Hawaiian descent. He married his wife Rheyannon in July 2020, and they reside in Rome, Georgia.

== Titles & Achievements ==
- 1994 Capital City Nine-ball Open
- 1996 PBT Grand Prix de Puerto Rico
- 1996 U.S. Open Nine-ball Championship
- 2001 Sands Regency Nine-ball Open
- 2002 Hard Times 9-Ball Open
- 2003 World Pool League
- 2003 Mosconi Cup
- 2004 Breakers Open 9-Ball
- 2004 Sands Regency Nine-ball Open
- 2004 Seminole Florida Pro Tour Stop
- 2004 Corpus Christi Classic
- 2004 Houston Open 9-Ball
- 2004 World All Stars Invitational Team Cup
- 2004 Mosconi Cup
- 2004 Mosconi Cup MVP
- 2005 Mosconi Cup
- 2006 Andy Grubbs Memorial 9-Ball
- 2006 UPA Pro Tour Championship
- 2006 Seminole Florida Pro Tour Stop
- 2007 SE Open Nine-ball Tour Stop
- 2007 Steve Mizerak Ten-ball Championship
- 2008 World Cup of Pool, with (Shane Van Boening)
- 2008 Quezon City Invasion
- 2010 Seminole Pro Tour Stop
- 2010 Poison Doubles Eight-ball Championship
- 2010 Seminole Pro Tour Stop
- 2011 Derby City Classic Ten-ball Challenge
- 2011 Interpool Open Nine-ball Tournament
- 2011 Turning Stone Classic XVII
- 2011 Chuck Markulis Memorial 9-Ball
- 2011 Seminole Pro Tour Stop
- 2012 Wyoming Nine-ball Open
- 2013 CSI U.S. Open Ten-ball Championship
- 2014 Cole Dickson Memorial
- 2015 Super 32 Ten-ball Championship
- 2015 Chinook Winds Open Ten-ball
- 2016 Don Coates Memorial 9-Ball
- 2016 Billiard Congress of America Hall of Fame

Preceded by Reed Pierce	U.S. Open Nine-ball Champion; 1996	Succeeded by Earl Strickland

Preceded by Efren Reyes	World Pool League champion 2003	Succeeded by Francisco Bustamante

Preceded by Dennis Orcollo	U.S. Open Ten-ball Champion; 2013	Succeeded by Ko Pin-yi
