= Cue sports at the 2010 Asian Games – Men's nine-ball singles =

Men's nine-ball singles at the 2010 Asian Games
- Venue: Asian Games Town Gymnasium
- Dates: 16–18 November 2010
- Competitors: 44 from 23 nations

Medalists
gold medal	Dennis Orcollo	Philippines
silver medal	Warren Kiamco	Philippines
bronze medal	Jeong Young-hwa	South Korea
bronze medal	Ko Pin-yi	Chinese Taipei

The men's nine-ball singles tournament at the 2010 Asian Games in Guangzhou took place from 16 November to 18 November at Asian Games Town Gymnasium.

== Schedule ==
All times are China Standard Time (UTC+08:00)

Date	Time	Event
Tuesday, 16 November 2010	10:00	Preliminary
Tuesday, 16 November 2010	16:00	Last 32
Wednesday, 17 November 2010	13:00	Last 16
Wednesday, 17 November 2010	16:30	Quarterfinals
Thursday, 18 November 2010	10:00	Semifinals
Thursday, 18 November 2010	13:00	Final

== Results ==
Legend

- WO — Won by walkover

=== Finals ===
Semifinals			Final
1	Dennis Orcollo (PHI)	9
4	Jeong Young-hwa (KOR)	3	1	Dennis Orcollo (PHI)	9
3	Ko Pin-yi (TPE)	7	2	Warren Kiamco (PHI)	7
2	Warren Kiamco (PHI)	9

=== Top half ===
==== Section 1 ====
Preliminary
Pürevsürengiin Odkhüü (MGL)	9
Mohammed Al-Harthi (KSA)	5
Shiwaz Ahmed (MDV)	5
Nader Khan Sultani (AFG)	9
Irsal Nasution (INA)	6
Nguyễn Phúc Long (VIE)	7

Last 32
1	Dennis Orcollo (PHI)	9
Pürevsürengiin Odkhüü (MGL)	2
Masaaki Tanaka (JPN)	WO
Al-Muhtadee Billah (BRU)
Khaled Al-Mutairi (IOC)	6
Nader Khan Sultani (AFG)	9
Nguyễn Phúc Long (VIE)	9
Manan Chandra (IND)	3

Last 16
1	Dennis Orcollo (PHI)	9
Masaaki Tanaka (JPN)	4
Nader Khan Sultani (AFG)	4
Nguyễn Phúc Long (VIE)	9

Quarterfinals
1	Dennis Orcollo (PHI)	9
Nguyễn Phúc Long (VIE)	8

==== Section 2 ====
Preliminary
Ibrahim Amir (MAS)	3
Chan Keng Kwang (SIN)	9
Tayef Quader (BAN)	1
Fu Jianbo (CHN)	9
Chang Jung-lin (TPE)	9
Mohamad Ali Berjaoui (LIB)	5

Last 32
Mohammed Al-Binali (QAT)	9
Chan Keng Kwang (SIN)	4
Fu Jianbo (CHN)	9
Kwok Chi Ho (HKG)	3
Nitiwat Kanjanasri (THA)	9
Firas Kamel (IRQ)	2
Chang Jung-lin (TPE)	7
4	Jeong Young-hwa (KOR)	9

Last 16
Mohammed Al-Binali (QAT)	5
Fu Jianbo (CHN)	9
Nitiwat Kanjanasri (THA)	5
4	Jeong Young-hwa (KOR)	9

Quarterfinals
Fu Jianbo (CHN)	6
4	Jeong Young-hwa (KOR)	9

=== Bottom half ===
==== Section 3 ====
Preliminary
Peter Gilchrist (SIN)	9
Lkhagvabazaryn Mönkhbold (MGL)	7
Alok Kumar (IND)	4
Hisataka Kamihashi (JPN)	9
Ricky Yang (INA)	9
Mazen Berjaoui (LIB)	2

Last 32
3	Ko Pin-yi (TPE)	9
Peter Gilchrist (SIN)	3
Mohammed Baabad (KSA)	9
Lee Kang (KOR)	8
Lee Poh Soon (MAS)	7
Hisataka Kamihashi (JPN)	9
Ricky Yang (INA)	9
Fahim Sinha (BAN)	4

Last 16
3	Ko Pin-yi (TPE)	9
Mohammed Baabad (KSA)	2
Hisataka Kamihashi (JPN)	7
Ricky Yang (INA)	9

Quarterfinals
3	Ko Pin-yi (TPE)	9
Ricky Yang (INA)	6

==== Section 4 ====
Preliminary
Lương Chí Dũng (VIE)	9
Shafraz Hassan (MDV)	1
Kanybek Sagynbaev (KGZ)	7
Abdullah Al-Yousef (IOC)	9
Surathep Phoochalam (THA)	9
Ayhab Hasan (IRQ)	4

Last 32
Dang Jinhu (CHN)	9
Lương Chí Dũng (VIE)	4
Abdullah Al-Yousef (IOC)	9
Bahauddin Faqiri (AFG)	5
Bashar Hussein (QAT)	2
Lee Chen Man (HKG)	9
Surathep Phoochalam (THA)	5
2	Warren Kiamco (PHI)	9

Last 16
Dang Jinhu (CHN)	9
Abdullah Al-Yousef (IOC)	7
Lee Chen Man (HKG)	3
2	Warren Kiamco (PHI)	9

Quarterfinals
Dang Jinhu (CHN)	8
2	Warren Kiamco (PHI)	9
