= Chunchen =

Chunchen is a transliteration of multiple Chinese given names.

People called "Chunchen" include:

- Chen Chunchen (陳純甄, born 1975), a Taiwanese professional pool player
- Wang Chunchen (王春辰, born 1964), a Chinese art historian, curator, and critic
