= Dang Jinhu =

Chinese pool player

Personal information
- Nickname: "Golden Tiger"
- Nationality: China
- Born: November 9, 1986 (age 39)

Pool career
- Pool games: nine-ball

Dang Jinhu (born November 9, 1986), nicknamed "Golden Tiger" is a Chinese professional pool player.

== Career ==
Dang started competing internationally in 2009, reaching the last 16 of the China 9-Ball Open. He reached the last 32 round of the 2010 WPA World Nine-ball Championship, losing 7‍–‍11 to Ronato Alcano. He entered the nine-ball singles event at the 2010 Asian Games, losing in the quarter-finals 8‍–‍9 to Warren Kiamco. He reached the last 16 of the 2011 Beijing Open, and entering both the ten-ball and nine-ball World Championships in 2011. He would lost 7‍–‍9 to Ko Pin-yi in the last 32 of the ten-ball event and 6‍–‍11 in the last 64 to Darren Appleton in the nine-ball event.

Dang reached the last 16 of the 2012 China Open, losing 9‍–‍11 to eventual winner Dennis Orcollo. He reached the quarter-finals of the 2013 U.S. Open 10-Ball Championship. Teaming with Wang Can, Dang reached the quarter-finals at the 2014 World Cup of Pool.

As one of the first Chinese players to return to competition following the COVID-19 pandemic, he defeated Marc Bijsterbosch 13–12 in the final of the 2023 Spanish Open Pool Championship. Dang reached the final of the 2024 Asian ten-ball Championship, losing 6‍–‍11 to Chang Jung-lin. He reached the final of the 2025 China 9-Ball Open before losing to Wojciech Szewczyk 5‍–‍11.

== Titles ==
- 2023 Spanish Open Pool Championship
