= George SanSouci =

American pool player

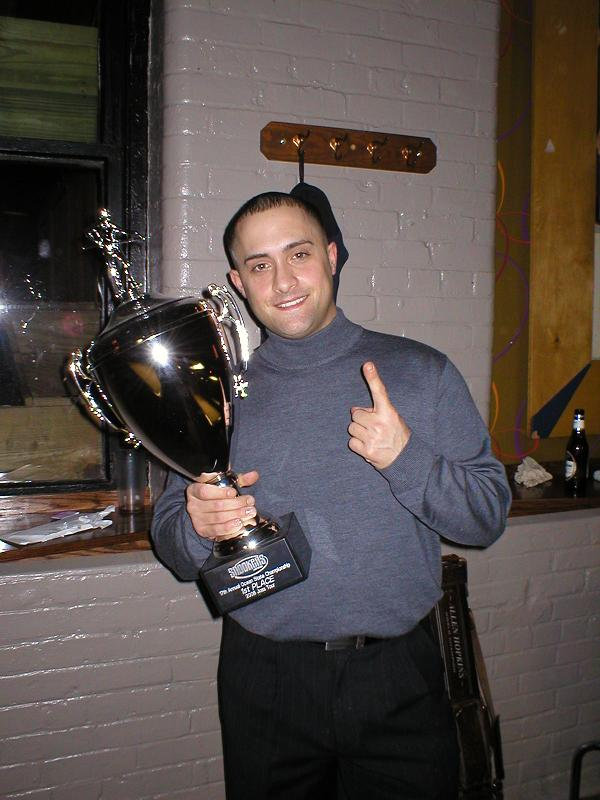
SanSouci holding his first-place trophy for the 2005 Ocean State Championship held in Providence, Rhode Island

George "Ginky" SanSouci (August 8, 1971 – March 8, 2011) was an American professional pool player from New York City. He grew up in Yorkville, New York, and started his career as a player in Chelsea Billiards. SanSouci lived in Astoria, New York.

== Early days ==
George Edward SanSouci Jr. was the son of George Edward SanSouci Sr. and Jeanne Marie Cawley. He was raised in the Yorkville Section of New York (currently Upper East Side) He was given nickname "Ginky" by his mother Jeanne when he was born; Sansouci is known for his achievements as a Professional Pool Player.

== Professional career ==
In 1995, Billiards Digest named San Souci as Rookie Player of the Year. SanSouci retired in 2002 after he injured his neck, but he could not stay away from pool, slowly making a comeback. He competed regularly in a regional tour of the New York region, the Predator Nine-ball Tour, with Tony Robles, the 2004 BCA Open Champion, as the tournament director. His high run in straight pool was 343 consecutive shots which occurred on July 19, 2009, at Slate Billiards in New York City. SanSouci was also a member of the International Pool Tour, when it was active.

== Titles ==
- 1991 Massachusetts State 9-Ball
- 1993 Stamford Open 9-Ball
- 1994 Rhode Island State 9-Ball
- 1994 Ocean State 9-Ball
- 1995 Rhode Island State 9-Ball
- 1995 Ocean State 9-Ball
- 1996 Maine State 9-Ball
- 1996 Ocean State 9-Ball
- 1996 McDermott Eastern States 9-Ball
- 1997 Delaware State 9-Ball
- 1998 Camel Pro Ten-Ball Championship
- 1999 National Straight Pool Championship
- 1999 BCA Open 9-Ball Championship
- 2000 Joss 9-Ball Tour
- 2000 Derby City Classic 9-Ball
- 2005 Rhode Island State 9-Ball

== Personal life ==
SanSouci suffered a number of injuries during his career that took a toll on his competitive play. He had retired in 2002 because of neck surgery and then in 2003 began playing again. He then broke his left wrist in a car accident in 2004 and re-fractured it in another more serious car accident, resulting in new fractures to his wrist as well as his wife being severely burnt, in 2009. Since his first neck injury, SanSouci was battling addiction to pain killers and alcohol. He spoke openly about his prescription drug addiction as well as his alcohol addiction in an interview with go4pool.net. In the interview he claimed to be seven days sober. In 2006, SanSouci moved to Astoria, NY and made The Steinway Cafe Billiards his new home, where he was the house pro until his death in 2011. SanSouci always wanted to make sure everyone spelled his last name correctly. He has been quoted in many interviews, including one in 2009, for go4pool.net, that his last name is "SanSouci, no space in the middle please! If you add it then you're spelling it wrong".

== Death ==
SanSouci died on March 8, 2011, at age 39.
