= Lee Vann Corteza =

Filipino pool player (born 1979)

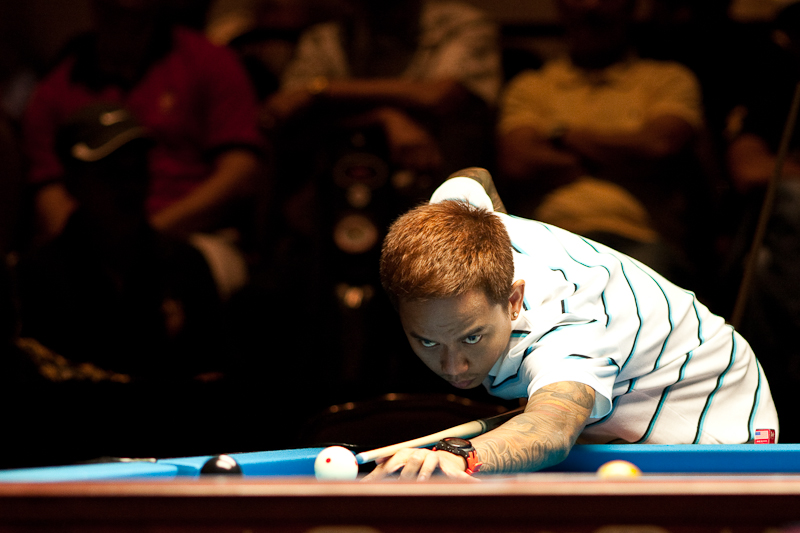
- Lee Vann Corteza at the 2013 U.S. Open Ten-ball Championship

Personal information
- Nickname: "The Slayer"
- Born: March 1, 1979 (age 47) Davao City

Pool career
- Country: Philippines
- Pool games: Nine-ball, ten-ball, eight-ball, straight pool, bank pool

Tournament wins
- Major: 2013 World Cup of Pool 2013 China 9-Ball Open
Medal record
Representing Philippines
Men's nine-ball
Southeast Asian Games
Gold medal – first place	1999 Bandar Seri Begawan	Singles
Gold medal – first place	1999 Bandar Seri Begawan	Team
Silver medal – second place	2001 Kuala Lumpur	Singles
Gold medal – first place	2003 Ho Chi Minh City	Doubles
Silver medal – second place	2007 Nakhon Ratchasima	Singles
Men's eight-ball
Southeast Asian Games
Gold medal – first place	2001 Kuala Lumpur	Singles
Gold medal – first place	2003 Ho Chi Minh City	Singles
Gold medal – first place	2005 Manila	Doubles
Silver medal – second place	2005 Manila	Singles

Lee Vann Corteza, also spelled Lee Van Corteza, (born March 1, 1979, in Davao City, Philippines) is a Filipino professional pool player. He is nicknamed "The Slayer", and started playing pool in 1993.

== Early life ==
Corteza is the oldest of five brothers. His parents named him after American actor Lee Van Cleef. Corteza first took up pool at age thirteen, after a friend brought him to a pool parlor. Corteza was subsequently blacklisted from the parlor after accidentally damaging a table, but he continued to pursue his passion for the game at other parlors.

== Career ==
Corteza has won four gold medals and one silver medal at the Southeast Asian Games, and was the winner of the 2004 WPA Asian Nine-ball Tour tournament in the Philippines, beating fellow countryman Francisco "Django" Bustamante 13–11 in the final.

On March 31, 2007, Corteza won the Philippine National Championship by defeating Marlon Manalo with a score of 13–11. In 2009, Corteza finished runner up in the WPA World Ten-ball Championship held at Quezon City, Philippines, losing to Mika Immonen of Finland 11–6.

In 2010, Corteza beat Taiwanese Lo Li-Wen 13–12, in the final to rule the U.S. Open Ten-ball Championship in Las Vegas. Corteza got the revenge after Lo Li-Wen sent him to the one loss side with 9–6 score. Corteza proceeded to defeat Shane Van Boening 9–8 in order to face Lo in the championship match, winning the title and $20,000 in prize money.

In 2013, Corteza defeated Fu Che-wei of Taiwan 11–6 to win the China Open Nine-ball Championship and pocketed the top prize of $40,000. Also in 2013, Corteza together with his partner Dennis Orcollo clinched the title in the 2013 World Cup of Pool after defeating the Dutch tandem of Niels Feijen and Nick van den Berg, 10–8, at York Hall in London, England. They became the third Filipino duo to win the annual single-elimination tournament for doubles teams in nine-ball competition after Efren "Bata" Reyes and Francisco Bustamante won the inaugural event in 2006 and then repeated in 2009.

In 2017, Corteza defeated Thorsten Hohmann 300–183 to win the Dragon 14.1 Tournament.

In 2020, Corteza dominated Joshua Filler of Germany, 11–4, to win the Derby City Classic Nine-ball held at Caesars Southern Indiana Casino and Hotel, Elizabeth, Indiana.

Corteza pocketed $16,000 for his efforts, while Filler settled for $8,000. Corteza was also able to reach the final of the bigfoot ten-ball event that year but would lose to Jayson Shaw of Great Britain 11–5.

In 2024, Corteza clinched the Predator Pro Billiards Series Las Vegas Ten-ball Open in an electrifying all-Filipino final, defeating fellow veteran Carlo Biado in two sets with scores of 4–2 and 4–3 at the Rio All-Suites Hotel & Casino in the United States.

Corteza took home $30,000 prize money (P1.7 million) for his victory, while Biado received $14,000 (P783,000) for his runner-up finish.

== Titles and achievements ==
- 2025 Rally in Shenandoah Valley Nine-ball Open
- 2025 U.S. Open Bank Pool Championship
- 2025 Turning Stone Classic
- 2024 Predator Las Vegas Open Ten-ball
- 2023 RAXX Classic Ten-ball Open
- 2023 SE Triple Crown All around
- 2023 SE Triple Crown Nine-ball
- 2020 Derby City Classic Nine-ball
- 2018 Japan Open Ten-ball
- 2017 World Pool Series Kamui Challenge
- 2017 World Pool Series Highrock Challenge
- 2017 Dragon 14.1 Tournament
- 2017 CSI U.S. Open Straight Pool Championship
- 2013 World Cup of Pool - with (Dennis Orcollo)
- 2013 China Open Nine-ball Championship
- 2013 Southern Classic Nine-ball
- 2011 Manny Pacquiao Ten-ball Championship
- 2011 San Miguel Beer Oktoberfest Nine-ball Open
- 2011 Golden Break Nine-ball Invitational Championship
- 2010 CSI U.S. Open Ten-ball Championship
- 2010 Hard Times Ten-ball Open
- 2010 Predator International Ten-ball
- 2009 Derby City Classic Ten-ball Challenge
- 2007 Turning Stone Classic
- 2007 Philippine National Championship
- 2006 All Japan Championship Nine-ball
- 2005 Southeast Asian Games Eight-ball Doubles
- 2004 San Miguel Asian Nine-ball Tour (Manila Leg)
- 2003 Southeast Asian Games Eight-ball Singles
- 2003 Southeast Asian Games Nine-ball Doubles
- 2001 Southeast Asian Games Eight-ball Singles
- 1999 Southeast Asian Games Nine-ball Singles
- 1999 Southeast Asian Games Nine-ball Team

== Personal life ==
Corteza currently resides Astoria, New York, although he has a house in Davao City and stays there when he returns to the Philippines.
