= Zhiting Wu =

Taiwanese pool player

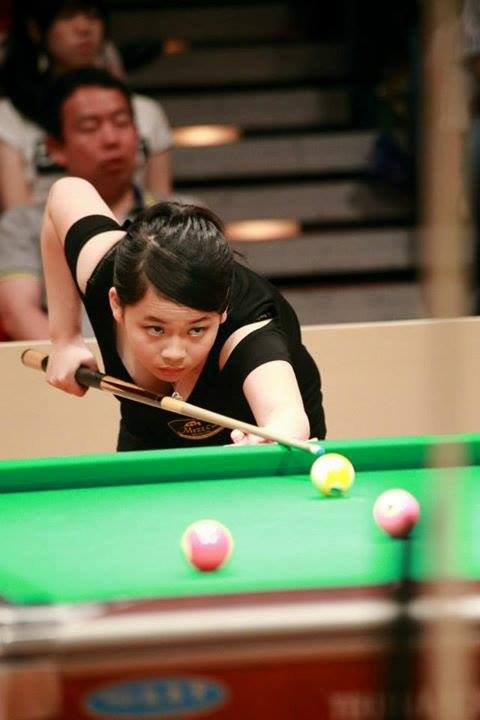
- Zhiting Wu on Japan Open Ladies 2013

Personal information
- Born: November 18, 1995 (age 30) Banqiao District, New Taipei City, Taiwan

Sport
- Country: Chinese Taipei
- Sport: Snooker
- Professional: Billiards

Zhiting Wu (Zhuting Wu at some), (born November 18, 1995) also known as Joana Wu, is a Taiwan professional pool player.

== Biography ==
Wu was born in Banqiao District of New Taipei City in 1995.

In an international 9-Ball tournament, Wu consecutively defeated 2 former world champions, Xiaoting Pan from China and Allison Fisher from England. She has been called "無敵妹" (Invincible Gal) in 2013.

In the Taiwan selection to Women's World 10-Ball Championship 2013, she was selected by defeating Lin Hsiao-Chi (WPA ranking 26th), Lai Hui-Shan (WPA ranking 15th) and 2013 World Games gold medal winner Chou, Chieh-Yu (WPA ranking 11th), all of which rank higher than Wu (WPA ranking 32nd) at that time.

In Hokuriku Open Ladies 2013 held by JPBA, Wu defeated Mayumi Taguchi (Japan) with 7:3, 7:0 over Yukiko Tanaka (Japan) and 7:4 over Reiko Motohiro (Japan) in try out on October 5. On October 6 Wu defeated Emi Aoki (Japan) with 7:4, 7:4 over Junko Mitsuoka (Japan) and 7:2 over Chihiro Kawahara (Japan), who is Japan ranking #1 player and the champion of Japan Open Ladies 2014, to get final. In the final, Wu defeated Kuo Szu-Ting, who also came from Taiwan, with 7:5. This was her first international tournament title.

On December 11, 2013, Zhiting Wu got the third place in WPA World Junior Champions.

== Titles & Achievements ==
- 2014 All Japan Championship 9-Ball
- 2014 Japan Open 9-Ball
- 2013 Hokuriku 9-Ball Open
