= Jose Parica =

Filipino pool player (born 1949)

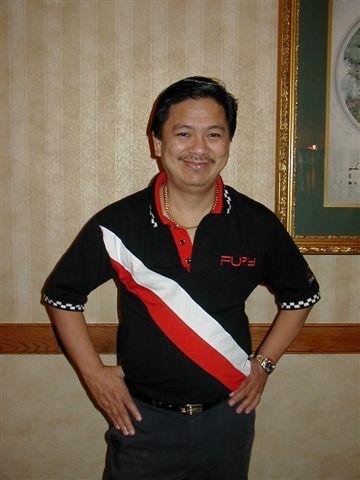

Personal information
- Nicknames: "Amang", "The Giant Killer"
- Born: 18 April 1949 (age 77) Manila, Philippines

Pool career
- Country: Philippines
- Turned pro: 1974
- Pool games: Nine-ball, ten-ball, eight-ball, one-pocket, rotation, bank pool

Tournament wins
- Other titles: 100
- World Champion: Nine-Ball (1988)
Medal record
Representing Philippines
Men's eight-ball
Southeast Asian Games
Silver medal – second place	1987 Jakarta	Singles

Jose Parica (born April 18, 1949) is a Filipino professional pool player from Manila, nicknamed "Amang" (English: "Father") and "the Giant Killer." As a Filipino Hall of Famer, he pioneered the "Filipino invasion" in the United States in the late 70s, especially in the game of Nine-ball. Also known as "the King" in the Philippines, Parica is regarded as one of the best pool players and money players in history. In 1997, Parica became the only player since to perform a perfect TPA score of .1000 in a race to 11 racks, making not a single mistake the entire match.

== Career ==
In 1976, Parica, hoping to get a better deal for Filipino billiard players, organized the Philippine Pocket Billiards Association and became its first president. The same year he was invited to the All Japan Championship and finished second in the Rotation division to Tetsuro Kakuto. In 1978, he was invited to his first tournament in the United States, the World Straight Pool Championship where he placed 11th. He was the first professional Filipino billiards player to travel to the United States. Shortly after, in 1979, Parica travelled back to the Philippines and became the National 3-Cushion, Rotation, and Snooker Champion.

Filipino player Efren Reyes joined Parica in 1985, in the start of what is now known as the "Filipino invasion". In 1982, Parica won the Playboy All-Around Classic, with the victory, Parica became the first male Asian player to win a professional pool event in the United States. In 1986, Parica won the Clyde Childress Memorial 9-Ball Open, followed up with a victory in the Classic Cup V title. In the 1987 Southeast Asian Games in Jakarta, he won a silver medal.

Parica had won over 100 international tournaments, including titles in the United States, the Philippines and Japan. In 1988, Parica participated in the Japanese circuit, winning the All Japan Championship in 9-Ball. That same year in Japan, he won the JPPA World 9-Ball Championship, sanctioned by the Japan Pool Players Association, which hosted the largest tournament at the time, with 900 players participating, which was a record number of participants in a tournament at the time. Parica beat Efren Reyes 9–3 in the finals, earning the first prize of $39,000 for his victory. This made Parica the first male Asian player to win a world championship in pocket billiards.

In 1994, Parica married his wife Aurora and became less active on the Professional Billiards Tour. In 1996, Parica resumed playing full time and won four tournaments that year, Beating rival Efren Reyes three times in the finals. In 1997, Parica won five tournaments and was ranked number 1 on the professional tour rankings as well as winning the Camel tour overall bonus of $50,000 defeating Buddy Hall. He was chosen Player of the Year in 1997 by the Billiards Digest Magazine.

== Allegations of crime ==
In the early 1990s, Parica attacked a man who he said was troubling his wife. The battered man had a different story, stating that Parica robbed him of his belongings. Parica was imprisoned for one day. After paying fines and testifying in court, Parica won the case and was released.

== Hall of Fame ==
Many fans and pundits of the game believed that Parica should have been inducted in to the Billiard Congress of America Hall of Fame long before his induction. Parica played professionally in to his 60s to further earn the recognition for his induction, that many people believed he already deserved. In 2014, Parica was inducted into the Billiard Congress of America Hall of Fame, at the age of 65.

== Personal Life ==
Parica owns a home care facility in Los Angeles. He has one son named Ramon.

== Career titles & achievements ==
- 2025 2nd Annual Easton Nine-ball Open
- 2014 Billiard Congress of America Hall of Fame
- 2011 Arizona State One Pocket
- 2011 Chuck Markulis Memorial One Pocket
- 2011 Empire State Championship
- 2010 Jay Swanson Memorial 9-Ball
- 2009 One Pocket Hall of Fame
- 2009 National Championship Series 10-Ball
- 2008 Joss Northeast Nine-ball Tour
- 2007 Blaze 9-Ball Tour
- 2008 Southern California 14.1 Tournament
- 2006 Pechauer Nine-ball West Coast Tour
- 2005 Corpus Christi Classic 9-Ball
- 2004 Joss Northeast Nine-ball Tour
- 2003 Great Seminole Senior Open
- 2003 Pechauer Nine-ball West Coast Tour
- 2003 Derby City Classic One-Pocket
- 2002 Joss Northeast Nine-ball Tour.
- 2002 Joss Northeast Nine-ball Tour
- 2002 Derby City Classic Master of the Table
- 2002 Capital City Classic One Pocket
- 2002 Hard Times Summer Jamboree, One Pocket
- 2001 Joss Northeast Tour
- 2001 Derby City Classic Bank Pool
- 2000 Hard Times Winter Jamboree, 9-Ball
- 2001 Joss Northeast Tour
- 1998 Hard Times One Pocket Open
- 1998 Andy Mercer Memorial 9-Ball
- 1997 Billiards Digest Player of the Year
- 1997 Camel Points Bonus
- 1997 Camel Boston Open
- 1997 Camel South Jersey Open
- 1997 PCA One Pocket Open
- 1997 PCA Sharky's Challenge
- 1997 PBT Legends of Nine-ball
- 1996 PBT Darafeev Pro Nine-ball Classic
- 1996 PCA Shooter's 9-Ball Open
- 1996 Lion's Den Tournament
- 1996 McDermott National One Pocket Open
- 1995 U.S. Open One Pocket Championship
- 1995 South Bay Billiards 9-Ball
- 1995 Gomez Challenge 9-Ball
- 1995 US Bar Table One Pocket Open
- 1995 Roanoke One Pocket
- 1995 On Cue Billiards 9-Ball Open
- 1994 Tommy's Billiards 9-Ball Open
- 1993 Philadelphia One Pocket Open
- 1993 PBT Riviera Team Championship
- 1992 Kiss Shot Billiards 9-Ball Open
- 1992 Philippine Nine-ball Championship
- 1992 Lexington All-Star Nine-ball
- 1991 Florida State 9-Ball Open
- 1991 Akron 9-Ball Open
- 1991 Sands Last Call For 9-Ball
- 1990 Tennessee Bar Table Championship
- 1990 Florida State 9-Ball Open
- 1990 Akron 9-Ball Open
- 1990 Jupiter 9-Ball Open
- 1990 Baxter 9-Ball Open
- 1989 Philippine Nine-Ball Championship
- 1988 Gandy Open 9-Ball Open
- 1988 JPPA World 9-Ball Championship
- 1988 All Japan Championship Nine-ball
- 1987 Pepsi Cola 9-Ball Open
- 1986 Great American 9-Ball Open
- 1986 Classic Cup V 9-Ball
- 1986 Clyde Childress Memorial 9-Ball Open
- 1982 Playboy All-Around Classic
- 1980 Philippine Nine-ball Championship
- 1980 Taiwan International All-around
- 1979 Philippine 3-Cushion Championship
- 1979 Philippine Rotation Championship
- 1979 Philippine Snooker Championship
- 1979 Philippine Eight-Ball Championship
- 1979 Philippines-Japan Team Rotation Competition
- 1978 All Japan Championship 14.1
- 1978 Philippines-Japan Team Rotation Competition
