= World Pool League =

The World Pool League (WPL) was a nine ball pool tournament promoted by Matchroom Sport and PartyGaming, and sanctioned by the World Pool-Billiard Association (WPA). All of the events were held in Warsaw, Poland, annually from 1999 to 2006. Six notable players were selected to participate in each event, which lasted for three days. Despite its name, the events were invitational tournaments, not a league in the usual sporting senses. The victor in the final event was Dennis Orcollo of the Philippines, 8–5 over Niels Feijen of the Netherlands, for a US$20,000 first-place prize.

== Format ==
=== Round robin stage ===
The players were arranged such that each on the others once, in round-robin fashion. Unlike most matches in the sport where a player has to score a required number of racks to win, players in this round play in an assigned number of racks (for example: 10 racks or 12 racks). If a player won more racks than those remaining in the match, 2 points were earned. If the match ended with two players in the same score, then both settled for a point each. The leading 4 players in the field proceeded to the semi-finals.

=== Semi-finals and final ===
The semi-finals were single-elimination (knock-out). The final was played as a race (such as race-to-nine or race-to-eight).

== Winners ==
Year	Location	Winner	Runner-up
1998	Warsaw, Poland	(United States) Jim Rempe	(Italy) Fabio Petroni
1999	Warsaw, Poland	(United States) Jim Rempe (2)	(Philippines) Efren Reyes
2000	Warsaw, Poland	(United Kingdom) Steve Knight	(Philippines) Francisco Bustamante
2001	Warsaw, Poland	(Philippines) Efren Reyes	(United Kingdom) Steve Davis
2002	Warsaw, Poland	(Philippines) Efren Reyes (2)	(United States) Earl Strickland
2003	Warsaw, Poland	(United States) Rodney Morris	(Germany) Thorsten Hohmann
2004	Warsaw, Poland	(Philippines) Francisco Bustamante	(Canada) Alex Pagulayan
2005	Warsaw, Poland	(Germany) Thorsten Hohmann	(Philippines) Francisco Bustamante
2006	Warsaw, Poland	(Philippines) Dennis Orcollo	(Netherlands) Niels Feijen
