= Jennifer Chen =

Jennifer Chen may refer to:

- Jennifer Chen (pool player)
- Jennifer Chen (politician)
