= Jennifer Chen (politician) =

Canadian politician

Jennifer Chen MLA

Member of the Legislative Assembly of Manitoba for Fort Richmond
- Incumbent
- Assumed office October 3, 2023
- Preceded by: Sarah Guillemard

Personal details
- Party: New Democratic
- Children: 2
- Education: University of Manitoba

Jennifer Chen is a Canadian politician, who was elected to the Legislative Assembly of Manitoba in the 2023 Manitoba general election. She represents the district of Fort Richmond as a member of the Manitoba New Democratic Party. She is the first MLA of Chinese descent to be elected to the Manitoba legislature.

Chen moved to Canada c. 2008 to attend the University of Manitoba, where she earned a master's degree in kinesiology. Prior to her election, she served as a trustee for the Winnipeg School Division.

== Electoral history ==
2023 Manitoba general election: Fort Richmond
Party	Candidate	Votes	%	±%	Expenditures
New Democratic	Jennifer Chen	4,455	54.46	+32.26	$29,564.11
Progressive Conservative	Paramjit Shahi	2,879	35.19	−6.96	$30,559.74
Liberal	Ernie Nathaniel	848	10.36	−20.36	$9,216.43
Total valid votes/expense limit		8,182	99.44	–	$53,129.00
Total rejected and declined ballots		46	0.56	–	
Turnout		8,228	62.07	+4.68	
Eligible voters		13,257			
New Democratic gain from Progressive Conservative		Swing		+19.61	
Source(s) Source: Elections Manitoba
