= Derby City Classic =

Annual pool event

The Derby City Classic is an annual pool convention and tournament held every January at the Caesars Southern Indiana casino in Elizabeth, Indiana, near Louisville, Kentucky. It is eight days long and offers various disciplines of competition for pool players of all caliber. It is often referred to as the DCC.

== History ==
The annual convention has been in existence since 1997. Diamond Billiard Products, is the title sponsor of the event, and the lead tournament promoter is Greg Sullivan. Over $100,000 is added to the tournament payouts. Sullivan was inspired to create the DCC by the Johnston City Classic, a former all-around tournament held in Johnston City, Illinois and first organized in 1961 with the purpose of bringing America's top pool gamblers together.

During the eight-day-long convention, competition is held consecutively in three major disciplines, bank pool, nine-ball, and one-pocket. According to Sullivan, "I made it where you're a sucker if you didn't enter." All tournaments are "buyback" competitions in which players can buy their way back in after being first eliminated; matches are races to three sets, much shorter than standard matches; and the entry fee for a tournament is less than that for a spectator's ticket. An All-Around Champion title is awarded each year to an individual player who participates in all three disciplines, and is determined by an ascending point scale and high quality of play, with a prize of $20,000.

The late "St. Louis" Louie Roberts, a legendary American player known for an entertaining style of play and high-stakes gambling action, is memorialized by the annual Louie Roberts A&E Award, which stands for "action and entertainment". Attendees of the event vote, and the pool player who displays the most action and entertainment a la Roberts each year wins the award and is thereafter granted lifetime free entry to the Derby City Classic, including a free room at the Horseshoe's hotel during the event. The title was awarded by the DCC from 2003 until 2014, and although it continued in 2015 and 2016 (via fans and not associated with the DCC), it officially stopped being awarded in 2017.

There are also smaller age-restricted competitions for under-16, over-21, over-62, and over-70 divisions, as well as a ladies-only tournament. Pool industry members bring their wares to the DCC and set up vendor booths, providing a billiard expo for attendees. The vendor booths display a large variety of cue sticks, pool paraphernalia, billiard clothing, books, and instructional DVDs.

To commemorate the great one-pocket champions, OnePocket.org, a website dedicated to the discipline, hosts an annual dinner gala at the Derby City Classic and inducts two people each year into the One Pocket Hall of Fame.

Since 2004, A Bank pool ring game event founded by the late Grady Mathews has been held, which consists of six players, who post an entry fee with a winner take all prize.

In 2007, a straight pool competition began where players are given an assigned number of chances to make a high run. The players with the 8 highest runs will qualify into a single elimination tournament where every match is race-to-125 points. In 2020 the straight pool competition had been cancelled due to schedule interference with other events and competitions.

== Winners ==
=== Main events ===
Several hundred players each year participate in the open Bank pool, One pocket and Nine-ball events to get an opportunity to win the overall title of $20,000 cash prize and to be awarded the prestigious title of "Master of the Table." It is possible for a player to win the "Master of the Table" title without winning any of the three competitions.

Year	Nine-ball	Bank pool	One pocket	Overall
1999	(United States) Troy Frank	(United States) Nick Varner	(Philippines) Efren Reyes	(Philippines) Efren Reyes
2000	(United States) George SanSouci	(United States) Shannon Daulton	(United States) Nick Varner	(United States) Dee Adkins
2001	(United States) Shannon Daulton	(Philippines) Jose Parica	(United States) Buddy Hall	(United States) Shannon Daulton
2002	(Finland) Mika Immonen	(United States) Larry Price	(United States) Cliff Joyner	(Philippines) Jose Parica
2003	(United States) Shannon Daulton (2)	(United States) Danny Harriman	(Philippines) Jose Parica	(United States) Larry Nevel
2004	(Germany) Ralf Souquet	(United States) Jason Miller	(Philippines) Efren Reyes (2)	(Philippines) Efren Reyes (2)
2005	(Philippines) Efren Reyes	(United States) David Matlock	(Philippines) Efren Reyes (3)	(Philippines) Efren Reyes (3)
2006	(Germany) Ralf Souquet (2)	(United States) Jason Miller (2)	(Philippines) Efren Reyes (4)	(United States) Jason Miller
2007	(Netherlands) Niels Feijen	(United States) Stevie Moore	(Philippines) Efren Reyes (5)	(Philippines) Efren Reyes (4)
2008	(Germany) Ralf Souquet (3)	(United States) Larry Price (2)	(United States) Gabe Owen	(Philippines) Francisco Bustamante
2009	(United States) Shane Van Boening	(United States) John Brumback	(United States) John Schmidt	(United States) John Brumback
2010	(Philippines) Efren Reyes (2)	(United States) John Brumback (2)	(United States) Scott Frost	(Philippines) Efren Reyes (5)
2011	(Philippines) Dennis Orcollo	(Philippines) Alex Pagulayan	(United States) Shane Van Boening	(United States) Shane Van Boening
2012	(United States) Shane Van Boening (2)	(Canada) John Morra	(United States) Shane Van Boening (2)	(United States) Shane Van Boening (2)
2013	(Canada) Alex Pagulayan	(Philippines) Francisco Bustamante	(United States) Corey Deuel	(Philippines) Francisco Bustamante (2)
2014	(United States) Shane Van Boening (3)	(Philippines) Dennis Orcollo	(Philippines) Efren Reyes (6)	(Philippines) Dennis Orcollo
2015	(Philippines) Warren Kiamco	(United States) Shannon Daulton (2)	(Canada) Alex Pagulayan	(Canada) Alex Pagulayan
2016	(United States) Shane Van Boening (4)	(United States) John Brumback (3)	(Canada) Alex Pagulayan (2)	(Canada) Alex Pagulayan (2)
2017	(Philippines) Dennis Orcollo (2)	(Philippines) Francisco Bustamante (2)	(United States) Billy Thorpe	(Philippines) Dennis Orcollo (2)
2018	(England) Chris Melling	(United States) Corey Deuel	(Philippines) Francisco Bustamante	(Philippines) Francisco Bustamante (3)
2019	(United States) Skyler Woodward	(United States) Billy Thorpe	(Philippines) Francisco Bustamante (2)	(United States) Skyler Woodward
2020	(Philippines) Lee Vann Corteza	(Philippines) Dennis Orcollo (2)	(United States) Billy Thorpe (2)	(Philippines) Dennis Orcollo (3)
2021	Not held due to the COVID-19 pandemic			
2022	(Spain) Francisco Sánchez Ruiz	(Russia) Fedor Gorst	(Russia) Fedor Gorst	(Russia) Fedor Gorst
2023	(Russia) Fedor Gorst	(Russia) Fedor Gorst (2)	(United States) Tony Chohan	(Russia) Fedor Gorst (2)
2024	(Germany) Joshua Filler	(Germany) Joshua Filler	(United States) Fedor Gorst (2)	(Germany) Joshua Filler
2025	(Germany) Joshua Filler (2)	(United States) Fedor Gorst (3)	(United States) Fedor Gorst (3)	(United States) Fedor Gorst (3)
2026	(Germany) Joshua Filler (3)	(United States) Justin Hall	(United States) Shane Van Boening (3)	(United States) Shane Van Boening (3)

=== Top performers ===
Name	Nationality	Winner	Runner-up	Finals
Efren Reyes	Philippines	13	6	19
**Shane Van Boening**	United States	10	7	17
**Fedor Gorst**	United States	10	1	12
**Francisco Bustamante**	Philippines	7	4	11
Dennis Orcollo	Philippines	7	1	8
**Alex Pagulayan**	Canada	6	5	11
Shannon Daulton	United States	5	2	7
**Joshua Filler**	Germany	5	2	7
John Brumback	United States	4	5	9
Jose Parica	Philippines	3	3	6
Jason Miller	United States	3	1	4
Ralf Souquet	Germany	3	1	4
**Billy Thorpe**	United States	2	2	4
**Corey Deuel**	United States	2	2	4
Nick Varner	United States	2	1	3
Larry Price	United States	2	0	2
**Skyler Woodward**	United States	2	0	2
**John Morra**	Canada	1	3	4
**Justin Hall**	United States	1	3	4
Buddy Hall	United States	1	2	3
Larry Nevel	United States	1	2	3
**Tony Chohan**	United States	1	2	3
Cliff Joyner	United States	1	1	2
David Matlock	United States	1	1	2
**Dee Adkins**	United States	1	1	2
Gabe Owen	United States	1	1	2
**Lee Vann Corteza**	Philippines	1	1	2
Mika Immonen	Finland	1	1	2
Niels Feijen	Netherlands	1	1	2
**Scott Frost**	United States	1	1	2
Stevie Moore	United States	1	1	2
Chris Melling	England	1	0	1
Danny Harriman	United States	1	0	1
Francisco Sánchez Ruiz	Spain	1	0	1
George SanSouci	United States	1	0	1
John Schmidt	United States	1	0	1
Troy Frank	United States	1	0	1
Warren Kiamco	Philippines	1	0	1

- Active participants are shown in **bold**.
- Only players who reached the final are included. This includes the Bank pool, One Pocket, Nine-ball & Overall divisions.
- In the event of identical records, players are sorted in alphabetical order by first name.

== Bigfoot Ten-ball Invitational ==
The bigfoot ten-ball event, played on a 10 ft table and is played alongside the other events, a 16 player invitational, that does not count towards the "Master of the Table" overall title.

Year	Winner	Runner-up
2013	(Philippines) Dennis Orcollo	(Netherlands) Niels Feijen
2014	(United States) Shane Van Boening	(Netherlands) Niels Feijen
2015	(United States) Shane Van Boening (2)	(Philippines) Lee Vann Corteza
2016	(Scotland) Jayson Shaw	(United States) Shane Van Boening
2017	(Scotland) Jayson Shaw (2)	(Greece) Alexander Kazakis
2018	(Philippines) Roberto Gomez	(Russia) Fedor Gorst
2019	(Chinese Taipei) Chang Jung-lin	(Germany) Joshua Filler
2020	(Scotland) Jayson Shaw (3)	(Philippines) Lee Vann Corteza
2021	Not held due to the COVID-19 pandemic	
2022	(Germany) Joshua Filler	(Russia) Fedor Gorst
2023	(United States) Shane Van Boening (3)	(Poland) Konrad Juszczyszyn
2024	(Germany) Joshua Filler (2)	(Philippines) Lee Vann Corteza
2025	(Lithuania) Pijus Labutis	(Germany) Joshua Filler
2026	(United States) Fedor Gorst	(Canada) John Morra

=== Top performers ===
Name	Nationality	Winner	Runner-up	Finals
Shane Van Boening	United States	3	1	4
Jayson Shaw	Scotland	3	0	3
Joshua Filler	Germany	2	2	4
