= List of U.S. Open pool championships =

U.S. Open pool championships are generic terms that may refer to various professional pool tournaments, not all of them affiliated with each other. The "U.S. Open Pool Championships" started by the Billiard Congress of America (BCA), continued by CueSports International (CSI) founded by pool promoter Mark Griffin, with umbrella events in various disciplines, are not to be confused with the main pool disciple event U.S. Open 9-Ball Championship separately promoted by Matchroom Pool.

== CSI U.S. Open One-pocket Championship ==
Year	Winner	Runner-up
1994	(United States) Cliff Joyner	(United States) Billy Incardona
1995	(Philippines) Jose Parica	(United States) Cliff Joyner
1996	(United States) Jayme Goodwin	(Philippines) Jose Parica
1997	(United States) Leil Gay	(United States) Jayme Goodwin
1998	(United States) Jeremy Jones	(United States) Jeff Carter
1999	(United States) Cliff Joyner (2)	(United States) Larry Nevel
2000	(Philippines) Efren Reyes	(United States) Larry Nevel
2004	(United States) Cliff Joyner (3)	(United States) Shannon Daulton
2005	(United States) Scott Frost	(United States) Gabe Owen
2006	(United States) Nick Vita	(United States) Shawn Putnam
2007	(United States) Tony Chohan	(United States) Gabe Owen
2011	(Philippines) Efren Reyes (2)	(United States) Chris Gentile
2012	(United States) Shane Van Boening	(England) Darren Appleton
2013	(Philippines) Dennis Orcollo	(United States) Corey Deuel
2014	(Philippines) Dennis Orcollo (2)	(United States) Shane Van Boening
2016	(Canada) Alex Pagulayan	(United States) Corey Deuel
2018	(United States) Shane Van Boening (2)	(Philippines) Ronato Alcano
2019	(Philippines) Warren Kiamco	(United States) Shane Van Boening
2021	(United States) Justin Hall	(Philippines) Dennis Orcollo
2022	(United States) Tony Chohan (2)	(United States) Josh Roberts
2023	(United States) Evan Lunda	(United States) Billy Thorpe
2024	(United States) Shane Van Boening (3)	(Philippines) Roland Garcia
2025	(United States) Evan Lunda (2)	(Philippines) Roberto Gomez
2026	(Philippines) Carlo Biado	(Philippines) Roland Garcia

== CSI U.S. Open Ten-ball Championship ==
Year	Winner	Runner-up
2007	(Netherlands) Huidji See	(United States) Louis Ulrich
2010	(Philippines) Lee Vann Corteza	(Chinese Taipei) Lo Li-Wen
2011	(United States) Shane Van Boening	(Spain) David Alcaide
2012	(Philippines) Dennis Orcollo	(Philippines) Francisco Bustamante
2013	(United States) Rodney Morris	(Philippines) Dennis Orcollo
2014	(Chinese Taipei) Ko Pin-yi	(Chinese Taipei) Ko Ping-chung
2015	(Germany) Thorsten Hohmann	(United States) Justin Hall
2016	(United States) Shane Van Boening (2)	(United States) Rodney Morris
2017	(United States) Shane Van Boening (3)	(Philippines) Warren Kiamco
2018	(United States) Shane Van Boening (4)	(Canada) Alex Pagulayan
2019	(Netherlands) Marco Teutscher	(Philippines) Dennis Orcollo
2022	(Russia) Fedor Gorst	(Philippines) Lee Vann Corteza
2023	(Russia) Fedor Gorst (2)	(Philippines) Roland Garcia
2024	(United States) Shane Van Boening (5)	(Ukraine) Vitaliy Patsura
2025	(United States) Shane Van Boening (6)	(Venezuela) Jesus Atencio
2026	(Canada) John Morra	(United States) Shane Van Boening

== CSI U.S. Open Eight-ball Championship ==
Year	Winner	Runner-up
2013	(United States) Shane Van Boening	(Philippines) Carlo Biado
2014	(Chinese Taipei) Ko Ping-chung	(United States) Shane Van Boening
2015	(Philippines) Dennis Orcollo	(United States) Mike Dechaine
2016	(United States) Shane Van Boening (2)	(United States) Rory Hendrickson
2017	(Canada) Alex Pagulayan	(United States) Shane Van Boening
2018	(United States) Shane Van Boening (3)	(Canada) Alex Pagulayan
2019	(United States) Skyler Woodward	(Chinese Taipei) Chang Jung-lin
2022	(Philippines) Carlo Biado	(Philippines) Roland Garcia
2023	(Russia) Fedor Gorst	(Austria) Mario He
2024	(Poland) Wiktor Zieliński	(Spain) Francisco Sánchez Ruiz
2025	(United States) Shane Van Boening (4)	(Hungary) Olivér Szolnoki
2026	(United States) Fedor Gorst	(Philippines) Roland Garcia

== CSI U.S. Open Bank Pool Championship ==
Year	Winner	Runner-up
2004	(United States) Shannon Daulton	(Mexico) Marco Marquez
2005	(United States) Shannon Daulton (2)	(United States) Brandon Shuff
2006	(United States) John Brumback	(United States) Gerald Reichle
2007	(United States) John Brumback (2)	(United States) Jason Miller
2018	(United States) Shane Van Boening	(United States) Neil Jacobs
2019	(United States) Shane Van Boening (2)	(United States) Billy Thorpe
2021	(United States) Louis Demarco	(Philippines) Dennis Orcollo
2022	(United States) Scott Frost	(Philippines) Carlo Biado
2023	(United States) Billy Thorpe	(United States) Scott Frost
2024	(United States) Shane Van Boening (3)	(Philippines) Lee Vann Corteza
2025	(Philippines) Lee Vann Corteza	(United States) Evan Lunda
2026	(Canada) John Morra	(United States) Shane Van Boening
