= Dennis Orcollo =

Filipino pool player (born 1979)

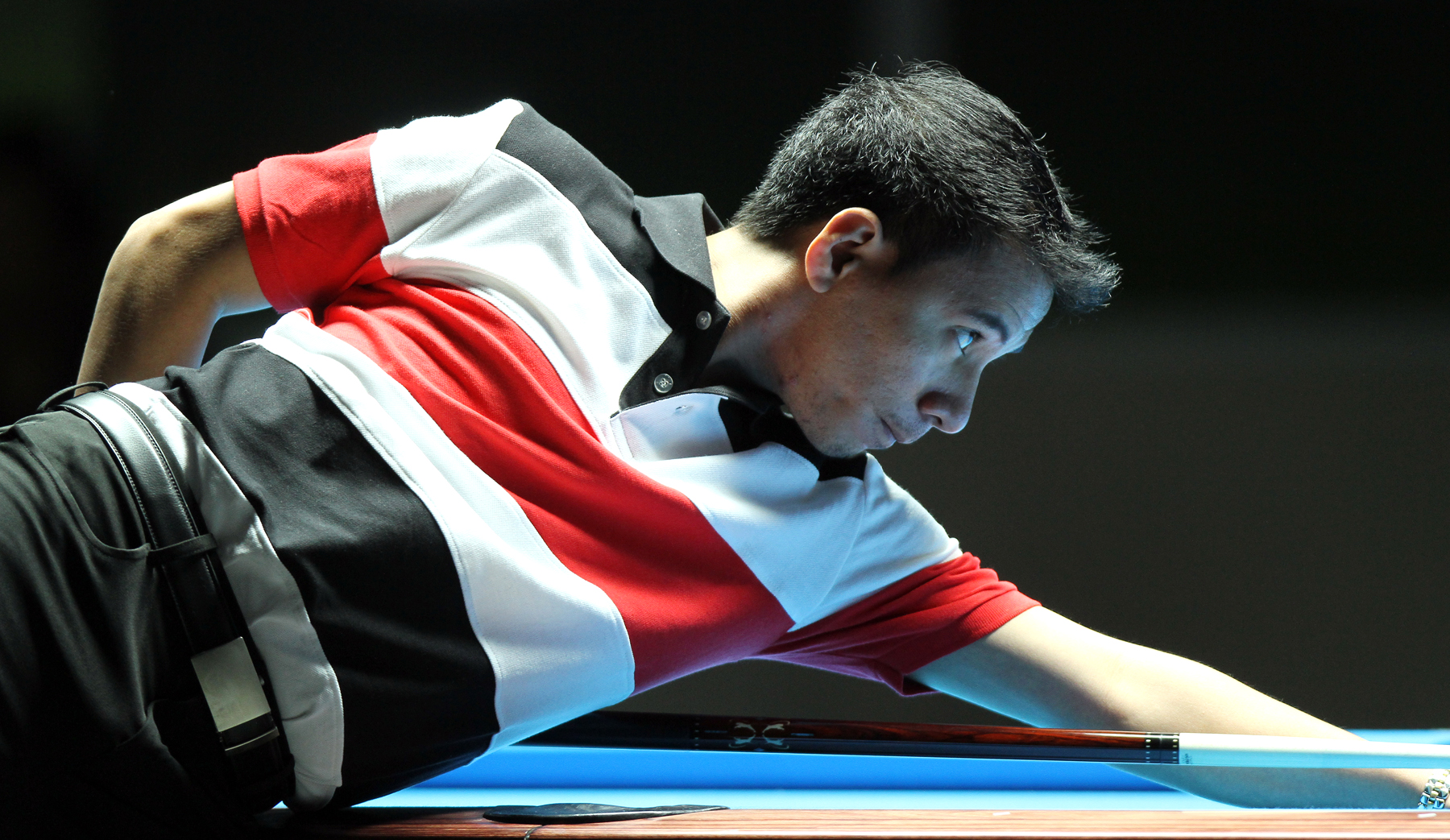
- Orcollo at the World 9-Ball Pool Championship in Doha in 2012

Medal record

Representing Philippines Men's eight-ball WPA World Eight-ball Championship

Southeast Asian Games
Gold medal – first place	2011 Palembang	Singles

Men's nine-ball

World Games
Bronze medal – third place	2013 Cali	Singles

Asian Games
Gold medal – first place	2010 Guangzhou	Singles

Southeast Asian Games
Gold medal – first place	2005 Manila	Doubles
Gold medal – first place	2015 Singapore	Singles
Bronze medal – third place	2009 Vientiane	Singles
Bronze medal – third place	2017 Kuala Lumpur	Doubles

Men's ten-ball

Southeast Asian Games
Gold medal – first place	2013 Naypyidaw	Singles
Gold medal – first place	2019 Philippines	Singles

Dennis Orcollo (born January 28, 1979), sometimes called Dennis Orcullo, is a Filipino professional pool player, nicknamed "Surigao" (after a province in the Philippines) and "RoboCop". He has been called "The Money-Game King". Orcollo is considered one of the greatest pool players of all time.

Since 2005, Orcollo has won over 90 professional tournaments, including over 20 major titles. He is a world champion, winning the 2011 WPA World Eight-ball Championship. Orcollo has been a dominant player at the annual Derby City Classic, winning seven times overall, including Master of the Table three times in 2014, 2017, and 2020.

Orcollo is a multiple-time Southeast Asian Games medalist, winning 5 golds and 2 bronze. He also won gold at the 2010 Asian Games and bronze at the 2013 World Games.

== Early life ==
Orcollo is the second of four brothers. His father was a fisherman in the southern village of Mangagoy, Surigao Del Sur, but a typhoon claimed his life in a boating accident when Dennis was just 5 years old. At 9 years of age, Orcollo dropped out of school because of financial problems and to focus on billiards and run racks on his grandfather's pool table, routinely beating grown men for 20 pesos a game. He was a pure shooter, cleanly sinking shots that others usually missed. At 16, despite pleas from his mother and grandfather, who wished he'd stay and become a fisherman, Orcollo left home for a gold mining town called Compostela, where he hustled pool. Within days no-one would play the prodigious teen, so he left for the capital of Manila at the age of 19, with a handful of dollars and nowhere to sleep. It was the mid-1990s and Orcollo had picked a good time in pool.

== Career ==
Orcollo began competing outside the Philippines in 2002. That year, he competed in the WPA World Nine-ball Championship where he finished 17th place.

In 2006, Orcollo began his campaign in the U.S. There he won a number of tournaments, including the Reno Open, the Hard Times Nine-ball Tournament and two bar table events. Because his compatriots had entered a less prestigious event in Asia, Orcollo was the only player from the Philippines to compete in the inaugural World Straight Pool Championship. Also in 2006, Orcollo won the last edition of the World Pool League tournament against Niels Feijen.

In 2007, Orcollo reached the finals of the WPA World Eight-ball Championship only to be bested by countryman Ronato Alcano. He would again reach the finals of the same event in 2011, this time to win against Niels Feijen.

In 2008, Orcollo won the Japan Nine-ball Open beating Ryogi Aoji of Japan 9–2 in the finals. Four months later, Orcollo ruled the inaugural Qatar World Nine-ball Open tournament defeating Niels "The Terminator" Feijen of Netherlands 13–5 in the championship match to bag the title and the top purse of $40,000. Feijen, received the runner-up prize of $20,000.

In 2010, Orcollo tops the World Pool Masters, which featured over 750 players from around the world and was hosted at the Riviera Hotel & Casino in Las Vegas. He defeated Japanese player Toru Kuribayashi 8–3 in the final and took home the $20,000 top prize. Orcollo also won the Asian Games Nine-ball singles, beating compatriot Warren Kiamco, 9–7. He was awarded as one of the 2010 Philippines Sportsman of the year.

In 2011, Orcollo snapped off his first World title after beating Neils Feijen of Netherlands 10–3 in the final of the World Eight-ball Championship. Orcollo won the 2011 Derby City Classic nine-ball, beating American player Shane Van Boening 7–2 in the final. Orcollo also won the Predator International Ten-ball Championship for the second time after he beat Mika Immonen of Finland 10–8. Orcollo was named the 2011 WPA player of year.

In 2012, Orcollo won the US Open Ten-ball Championship, defeating compatriot Francisco "Django" Bustamante, 11–5 in the championship match to win the top prize of US$15,000. He then won the Hard Times Ten-ball Open after he dominated Shane Van Boening 11–3 in the final. Orcollo also conquered the China Open Nine-ball Championship when he dispatched Chinese Taipei's Lu Hui-Chan, 11–9. Orcollo was named the 2012 AZBilliards player of the year.

In 2013, Dennis Orcollo and Lee Vann Corteza clinched the World Cup of Pool after defeating the Dutch tandem of Niels Feijen and Nick van den Berg, 10–8, at York Hall in London, England. They became the third Filipino duo to win the annual single-elimination tournament for doubles teams in nine-ball competition after Efren "Bata" Reyes and Francisco "Django" Bustamante won the inaugural event in 2006 and then repeated in 2009.

Orcollo sought redemption after he came up close in 2010 World cup of Pool with a second-place finish with his partner Roberto Gomez, bowing to eventual winners Li Hewen and Fu Jianbo of China.

In 2015, Orcollo overcame Mike Dechaine 11–9 in the final to win the US Open eight-ball Championship. Orcollo earned $11,000 for first place, while Dechaine settled for $7,000.

In 2016, Orcollo defeated Shane Van Boening, 200–121 to win the U.S. Open Straight Pool Championship, a tournament that has not been held previously for sixteen years.

In 2020, Orcollo recorded a 120–119 victory against Shane Van Boening to be crowned The Money Game King in a three-day one-on-one 9-ball tournament held at Bill's Bar and Billiards in Oklahoma City.

In 2021, Orcollo defeated Shane Van Boening again, this time by a score of 120–115 in their race to a 120 nine-ball rematch.

In their early match on day 1, Orcollo runs an incredible 11 straight racks in a row. The only other pool player to ever have run 11 consecutive racks in history was Earl Strickland.

In 2022, Orcollo was the fourth Filipino pool player to be inducted into the BCA Hall of fame, joining fellow countrymen Efren Reyes, Francisco Bustamante, and Jose Parica.

== Deportation ==
Orcollo was deported from the United States in January 2022 reportedly due to overstaying in the country. He is barred from going back to the United States for five years, consequentially making him unable to compete in US tournaments.

== Titles and achievements ==
- 2025 Kylin Billiards Chinese Nine-ball
- 2024 JingXi Harbin Chinese Eight-ball
- 2024 Jflowers China 9-Ball Open
- 2024 Jinkee Pacquiao Ten-ball International Open Doubles
- 2023 Thailand High Roller Nine-ball Singles
- 2022 Billiard Congress of America Hall of Fame
- 2021 Diamond Open One Pocket
- 2021 Aramith/Simonis Pro Classic One Pocket
- 2021 Aramith/Simonis Pro Classic Ten-ball
- 2021 Action Palace Open One Pocket
- 2021 Midwest Open Championship Banks Ring Game
- 2021 Michael Montgomery Memorial One Pocket
- 2021 Michael Montgomery Memorial Ten-ball
- 2021 Iron City Open One Pocket Division
- 2021 Iron City Open Ten-ball
- 2021 Iron City Open Nine-ball
- 2021 SE Triple Crown Nine-ball
- 2021 SE Triple Crown Nine-ball banks
- 2021 Cajun Coast Classic Banks Division
- 2021 Big Tyme Classic Open Nine-ball
- 2021 Texas Open One-Pocket Championship
- 2020 Pool & Billiard Magazine Player of the Year
- 2020 Texas Open Ten-ball Championship
- 2020 Texas Open Nine-ball Championship
- 2020 Scotty Townsend Memorial Nine-ball Mini
- 2020 Cue Time Shootout Open
- 2020 MCC Midnight Madness
- 2020 Derby City Classic Master of the Table
- 2020 Derby City Classic Nine-ball Banks
- 2019 Southeast Asian Games Ten-ball Singles
- 2019 Houston Open Nine-ball
- 2018 Houston Open Nine-ball
- 2018 Freezer's One Pocket Challenge
- 2018 West Coast Challenge Ten-ball
- 2018 Derby City Classic 14.1 Challenge
- 2018 Junior Norris Memorial Shoot-out Ten-ball
- 2017 Derby City Classic Master of the Table
- 2017 Derby City Classic Nine-ball
- 2017 Midwest Billiards and Cue Expo One Pocket
- 2017 Buffalo's Pro One Pocket
- 2017 West Coast Challenge One Pocket
- 2017 Annual Cole Dickson Ten-ball
- 2017 Scotty Townsend Memorial Nine-ball
- 2017 Scotty Townsend Memorial Ten-ball Ring
- 2017 VA Ten-ball Championship
- 2016 CSI U.S. Open Straight Pool Championship
- 2016 Derby City Classic 14.1 Challenge
- 2016 Sidepocket's Open Nine-ball
- 2016 Annual Cole Dickson Nine-ball
- 2016 Andy Mercer Memorial Nine-ball Tournament
- 2016 The Break Room Eight-ball Classic
- 2016 West Coast Challenge Ten-ball
- 2016 West Coast Challenge One Pocket
- 2015 CSI U.S. Open Eight-ball Championship
- 2015 Carom Room Fall Classic
- 2015 Super Billiards Expo Championship
- 2015 Tornado Open Men's Ten-ball
- 2015 Southeast Asian Games Nine-ball Singles
- 2014 Hard Times Ten-ball Open
- 2014 CSI U.S. Open One-Pocket Championship
- 2014 Derby City Classic 14.1 Challenge
- 2014 Derby City Classic Master of the Table
- 2014 Derby City Classic Nine-ball Banks
- 2014 Jay Swanson Memorial Nine-ball Tournament
- 2013 Jay Swanson Memorial Nine-ball Tournament
- 2013 World Cup of Pool - With (Lee Vann Corteza)
- 2013 Southeast Asian Games Ten-ball Singles
- 2013 CSI U.S. Open One-Pocket Championship
- 2013 US Bar Table Championship Ten-ball
- 2013 CSI US Bar Table Championship All-around Title
- 2013 Derby City Classic Bigfoot Ten-ball Challenge
- 2012 AZBilliards Player of the Year
- 2012 China Open 9-Ball Championship
- 2012 Hard Times Ten-ball Open
- 2012 CSI U.S. Open Ten-ball Championship
- 2011 Philippines Sportsman of the Year
- 2011 WPA Player of the Year
- 2011 Predator International Ten-ball Championship
- 2011 WPA World Eight-ball Championship
- 2011 Derby City Classic Nine-ball Division
- 2011 Southeast Asian Games Eight-ball Singles
- 2011 BSCP National Nine-ball Championships
- 2010 Philippines Sportsman of the Year
- 2010 Asian Games Nine-Ball Singles
- 2010 San Miguel Beer Octoberfest Nine-ball Open
- 2010 World Pool Masters
- 2009 Predator International Ten-ball Championship
- 2008 Guinness Asian Nine-ball Tour (China Leg)
- 2008 Qatar Open Nine-ball Tournament
- 2008 Japan Open 9-Ball
- 2007 BCA Open Nine-Ball Championship
- 2007 Bill Staton Memorial
- 2006 World Pool League
- 2006 CSI US Bar Table Championship Eight-ball
- 2006 Sands Regency 9-Ball Open
- 2006 Hard Times 9-Ball Open
- 2006 Bar Table 9-Ball Tour Championship
- 2005 Southeast Asian Games Nine-ball Singles
