= Francisco Bustamante =

Filipino pool player (born 1963)

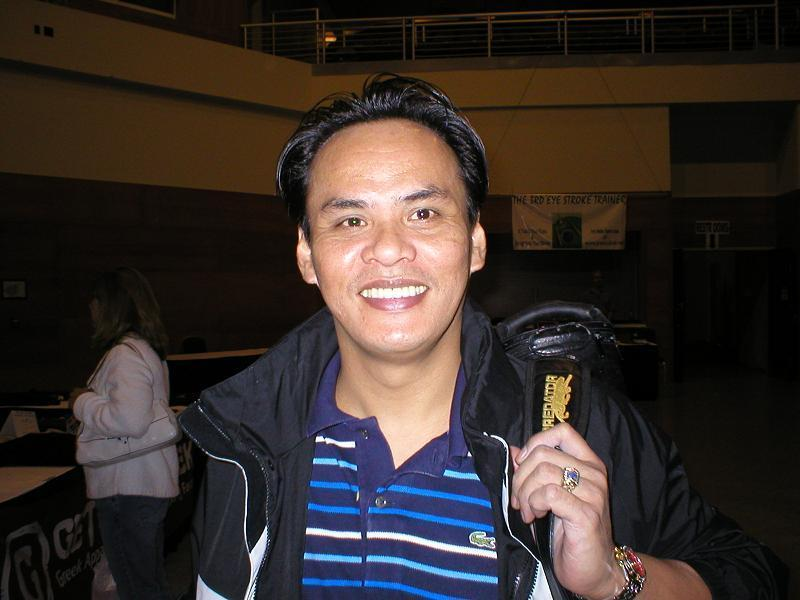
- Bustamante at an event, ca. 2007

Personal information
- Nickname: "Django"
- Born: December 29, 1963 (age 62) Tarlac, Philippines

Pool career
- Country: Philippines
- Turned pro: 1990
- Pool games: Nine-ball, ten-ball, one pocket, rotation, bank pool

Tournament wins
- World Champion: Nine-ball (2010)
- Highest rank: 1
Medal record
Representing Philippines
Men's Nine-ball
Asian Games
Gold medal – first place	2002 Busan	Doubles

Francisco Bustamante (born December 29, 1963) is a Filipino professional pool player from Tarlac, Central Luzon and the 2010 World Nine-ball Champion, nicknamed "Django", after the lead character of the 1966 film of the same name, and sometimes also called "Bustie", especially in the United States. Bustamante has won over 100 international titles and is considered one of the greatest pool players of all time.

== Early life ==
Bustamante is the youngest of eight siblings. He picked up the nickname "Django" because his character and his appearance with a cigarette in his mouth was reminiscent of the movie character of that name. His father made a living through building toilets and planting rice, and Bustamante also worked in these activities. He began working in his sister's pool hall, racking and spotting balls on the tables, and practising alone on the tables after the hall had closed.

Bustamante never completed high school and concentrated on pocket billiards from 10 years of age. After some success in the Philippines, Bustamante moved to Germany where he stayed for over ten years, competing in a number of tournaments in Europe.

== Career ==
Bustamante has won titles including the Munich Masters, the German Nine-ball Championship, and the All Japan Championship. With his win in Tulsa, Bustamante became champion of the 1998 Camel Pro Billiards Series year-long point fund. He then finished the season by winning the Columbus 10-Ball Open and becoming the first player to win three Camel titles in one season. His Columbus 10-Ball title completed the first ever Camel trifecta, with titles in each of the three games contested on the Camel Pro Billiards Series: eight-ball, nine-ball and ten-ball. Known for his flamboyant style at the table and behind-the-back shots, Bustamante also holds the world record for having the most powerful break shot.

In 1999, Bustamante finished third in the WPA World Nine-ball Championship after losing to Efren Reyes, who went on to win. A few months later he won the International Challenge of Champions. He won that tournament again three years later.

The next year, Bustamante won the Motolite 9-ball Tournament, an event held in the Philippines, beating Antonio Lining. The victory prize was $30,000, the largest first prize offered in a Philippine-held tournament at that time.

In 2002, Bustamante received a phone call from his wife during the World Pool Championships, informing him that his daughter, who was less than a year old, had died. Bustamante considered forfeiting his contention at the tournament to return to the Philippines, but some people around including fellow countryman Efren Reyes convinced him to go on. On his way to the final, Bustamante beat Antonio Lining in the last 16, Efren Reyes in the quarter finals, and Ching Shun Yang in the semis. In the final, he met Earl Strickland, twice winner of the tournament. After leading for most of the match, Bustamante lost the match 17–15.

Bustamante won the Peninsula Nine-ball Open, Gabriel's Las Vegas International Nine-ball tournament, the IBC Tokyo Nine-ball International, and the All Japan Championship. He also won the Sudden Death Seven-ball tournament, dedicating the victory to his daughter. With this string of victories, he became the AZBilliards 2002 Player of the Year.

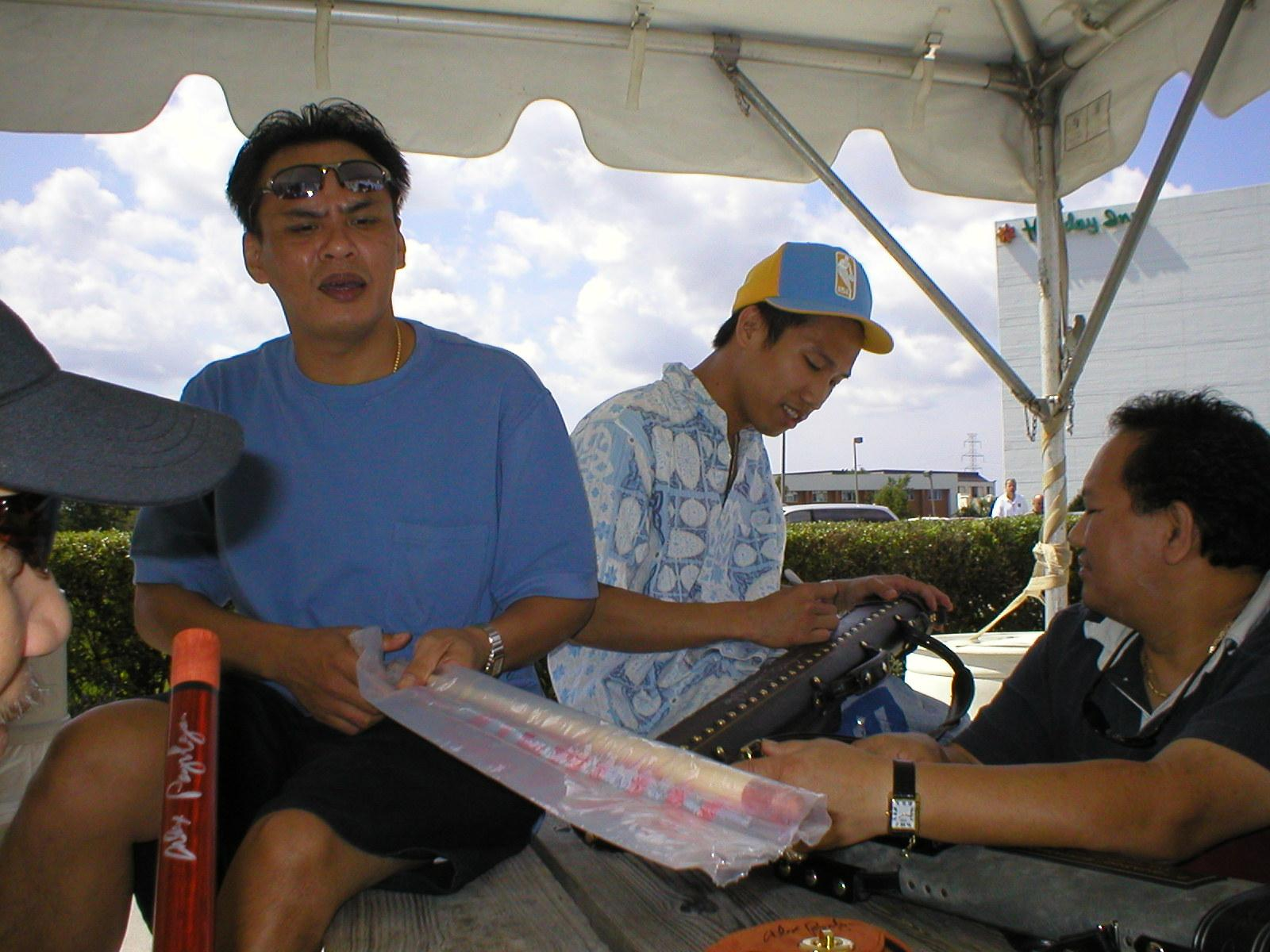
Francisco Bustamante (left) and Alex Pagulayan (center) at the 2004 US Open Nine-ball Championship signing autographs.

Bustamante won the World Pool League in 2004, defeating world nine-ball champion Alex Pagulayan. He reached the finals of that event in 2001 but was beaten by Steve Knight.

In 2006, Bustamante and his partner Efren Reyes won the inaugural World Cup of Pool, defeating the American duo of Earl Strickland and Rodney Morris 13–5 in the final. They also won the event for the second time in 2009, defeating the German pair of Ralf Souquet and Thorsten Hohmann 11–9.

In 2007, he was undefeated in the United States Pro Tour Championship held at the Normandie Casino in Los Angeles, California.

For 2007, he was ranked No. 7 in Pool & Billiard Magazine's "Fans' Top 20 Favorite Players" poll.

He competed in the 2008 WPA World Straight Pool Championship where he finished second behind Niels Feijen, becoming the only Filipino player to reach the finals of the event.

In 2010, Bustamante again reached the finals of the World Nine-ball Championship, winning the match and the title against Taiwan's Kuo Po-cheng.

On July 27, 2010, Francisco Bustamante, along with Terry Bell and Larry Hubbart, founders of the American Pool Players Association (APA), were elected to the Billiard Congress of America Hall of Fame, and inducted on October 21, 2010. Bustamante was the second player from the Philippines to be inducted, after Efren Reyes.

== Titles and achievements ==
- 2026 Buffalo's Pro Classic One-ball One Pocket
- 2025 Jay Swanson Memorial Nine-ball
- 2025 Bayou State Classic One-ball One Pocket
- 2024 Midwest Billiards and Cue Expo One Pocket
- 2024 One Pocket Hall of Fame
- 2020 Scotty Townsend One Pocket
- 2019 Big Tyme Classic One Pocket
- 2019 Junior Norris Memorial Ten-ball Ring Game
- 2019 Junior Norris Memorial Ten-ball Shootout
- 2019 Derby City Classic One Pocket
- 2018 Midwest Bar Table Classic One Pocket
- 2018 Derby City Classic Master of the Table
- 2018 Derby City Classic One Pocket
- 2017 Derby City Classic Bank Pool
- 2016 Derby City Classic Bank Pool Ring Game
- 2014 Interpool Open Ten-ball Challenge
- 2013 Derby City Classic Master of the Table
- 2013 Derby City Classic Bank Pool
- 2013 Southern Classic Master of the Table
- 2013 Southern Classic Nine-ball Ring Game
- 2013 Chet Itow Memorial Nine-ball
- 2013 White Diamond Super Nine-ball
- 2013 NJ State Ten-ball Championship
- 2013 Mezz Pro Am Tour
- 2012 Derby City Classic Ten-ball Challenge
- 2012 West Coast Challenge One Pocket Event
- 2012 West Coast Challenge Ten-ball Event
- 2010 Billiard Congress of America Hall of Fame
- 2010 Philippine Sportsman of the Year
- 2010 WPA World Nine-ball Championship
- 2010 Japan Open 9-Ball
- 2010 Asia vs Europe Challenge Match
- 2010 Chuck Markulis Memorial Nine-ball
- 2009 World Cup of Pool – with (Efren Reyes)
- 2009 All Japan Championship Nine-ball
- 2008 Derby City Classic Master of the Table
- 2008 Blaze ABCD Nine-ball Tour (Stop 14)
- 2007 Hard Times Summer Jamboree, One-Pocket
- 2007 Hard Times Summer Jamboree, Nine-ball
- 2007 UPA US Pro Tour Championship
- 2007 Willy Wonka's Chocolate Factory Bumper Pool
- 2006 World Cup of Pool – with (Efren Reyes)
- 2006 Philippine Open Nine-ball
- 2006 Bali 9-Ball International Open
- 2005 Masters Nine-ball Championship
- 2005 All-Filipino Billiards Open
- 2005 Bali 9-Ball International Open
- 2005 Weert Open Ten-Ball Ring Game
- 2005 Turning Stone Classic
- 2004 World Pool League
- 2004 Falcon Cue Nine-ball Tour Open
- 2004 Kansai Nine-ball Open
- 2004 World All Stars Invitational Team Cup
- 2003 ESPN International Challenge of Champions
- 2003 Joss Northeast Nine-ball Tour
- 2003 Joss Northeast Nine-ball Tour
- 2003 Joss Northeast Nine-ball Tour
- 2002 Billiards Digest Player of the Year
- 2002 All Japan Championship Nine-ball
- 2002 IBC Tokyo Nine-ball International
- 2002 IBC Munich Nine-ball Open
- 2002 Japan Open 9-Ball
- 2002 Asian Games Nine-ball doubles
- 2002 ESPN Sudden Death Seven-ball
- 2002 Gabriels Las Vegas Invitational
- 2002 Peninsula Nine-ball Open
- 2002 Motolite Nine-ball Challenge
- 2001 World Pool Masters
- 2001 Turning Stone Classic
- 2001 Joss Northeast Nine-ball Tour Championship
- 2000 Motolite International Nine-Ball Championship
- 2000 Euro Tour German Open
- 1999 ESPN International Challenge of Champions
- 1998 World Pool Masters
- 1998 Billiards Digest Player of the Year
- 1998 Euro Tour German Open
- 1998 Sands Regency Nine-ball Open
- 1998 Camel Points Bonus
- 1998 Camel Riviera Eight-ball Open
- 1998 Camel Tulsa Nine-ball Open
- 1998 Camel Columbus Ten-ball Open
- 1997 Camel Kasson Open
- 1997 Camel Denver Open
- 1995 German Pool Championship Nine-ball
- 1994 German Pool Championship Nine-ball
- 1993 PBT Riviera Team Championship
- 1993 PBT Bicycle Club Nine-ball Invitational
- 1992 Japan Open 9-Ball
- 1991 Brunswick Munich Masters
