= Warren Kiamco =

Filipino pool player

Personal information
- Born: May 2, 1970 (age 56) Cebu, Philippines

Pool career
- Country: Philippines
- Pool games: Nine-ball, ten-ball, eight-ball, one pocket, rotation
Medal record
Representing Philippines
Men's Nine-Ball
Asian Games
Silver medal – second place	2002 Busan	Singles
Silver medal – second place	2010 Guangzhou	Singles
Southeast Asian Games
Silver medal – second place	2001 Kuala Lumpur	Doubles
Gold medal – first place	2003 Saigon	Doubles
Gold medal – first place	2015 Singapore	Doubles
Bronze medal – third place	2017 Kuala Lumpur	Doubles
Bronze medal – third place	2019 Philippines	Doubles
Asian Indoor and Martial Arts Games
Bronze medal – third place	2017 Ashgabat	Doubles
Men's Rotation
Southeast Asian Games
Gold medal – first place	1999 Bandar Seri Begawan	Doubles
Silver medal – second place	1999 Bandar Seri Begawan	Singles
Gold medal – first place	2001 Kuala Lumpur	Singles

Warren Kiamco (born May 2, 1970) is a Filipino professional pool player from Cebu, Philippines. He is known for his performances in the Southeast Asian and Asian Games.

Kiamco was a runner-up in three events of the Asian Nine-ball Tour but never a champion.

Warren Kiamco, 38, defeated Efren Reyes, 11–6, and won P 400,000 top cash prize in the First Senate President Manny Villar Cup Billiards Tournament on May 10, 2008, at Muntinlupa.

== Titles ==
- 2021 Buffalo's Pro Classic Nine-ball
- 2021 Barry Behrman Memorial Open Nine-ball
- 2019 CSI U.S. Open One-Pocket Championship
- 2018 Freezer's Icehouse Ten-ball Challenge
- 2018 Andy Mercer Memorial Nine-ball
- 2017 West Coast Nine-ball Pro Challenge
- 2015 Southeast Asian Games Nine-ball Doubles
- 2015 Derby City Classic Nine-ball
- 2014 Steinway Classic Ten-ball
- 2013 Texas Open Nine-ball Championship
- 2012 Japan Open Ten-ball
- 2012 Johnny Archer Classic
- 2012 Houston Open Nine-ball
- 2011 CSI US Bar Table Nine-ball Championship
- 2011 CSI US Bar Table All-Around Title
- 2008 Manny Villar Cup Billiards Tournament
- 2007 CSI US Bar Table Nine-ball Championship
- 2007 CSI US Bar Table Eight-ball Championship
- 2007 CSI US Bar Table All-Around Title
- 2007 Blaze Nine-ball Tour Stop
- 2005 Kansai Nine-ball Open
- 2003 Southeast Asian Games Nine-ball Doubles
- 2001 Southeast Asian Games Rotation Singles
- 2000 Tokyo Nine-ball Championship
- 1999 Asian Nine-ball Championship
- 1999 Southeast Asian Games Rotation Doubles
- 1999 Canadian Championship
- 1995 Andy Mercer Memorial Nine-ball
