= One-pocket =

Pool game

- Highest governing body: World Pool Association

Characteristics
- Contact: No
- Team members: single competitors
- Mixed-sex: Yes
- Equipment: Cue sports equipment
- Glossary: glossary of cue sports terms

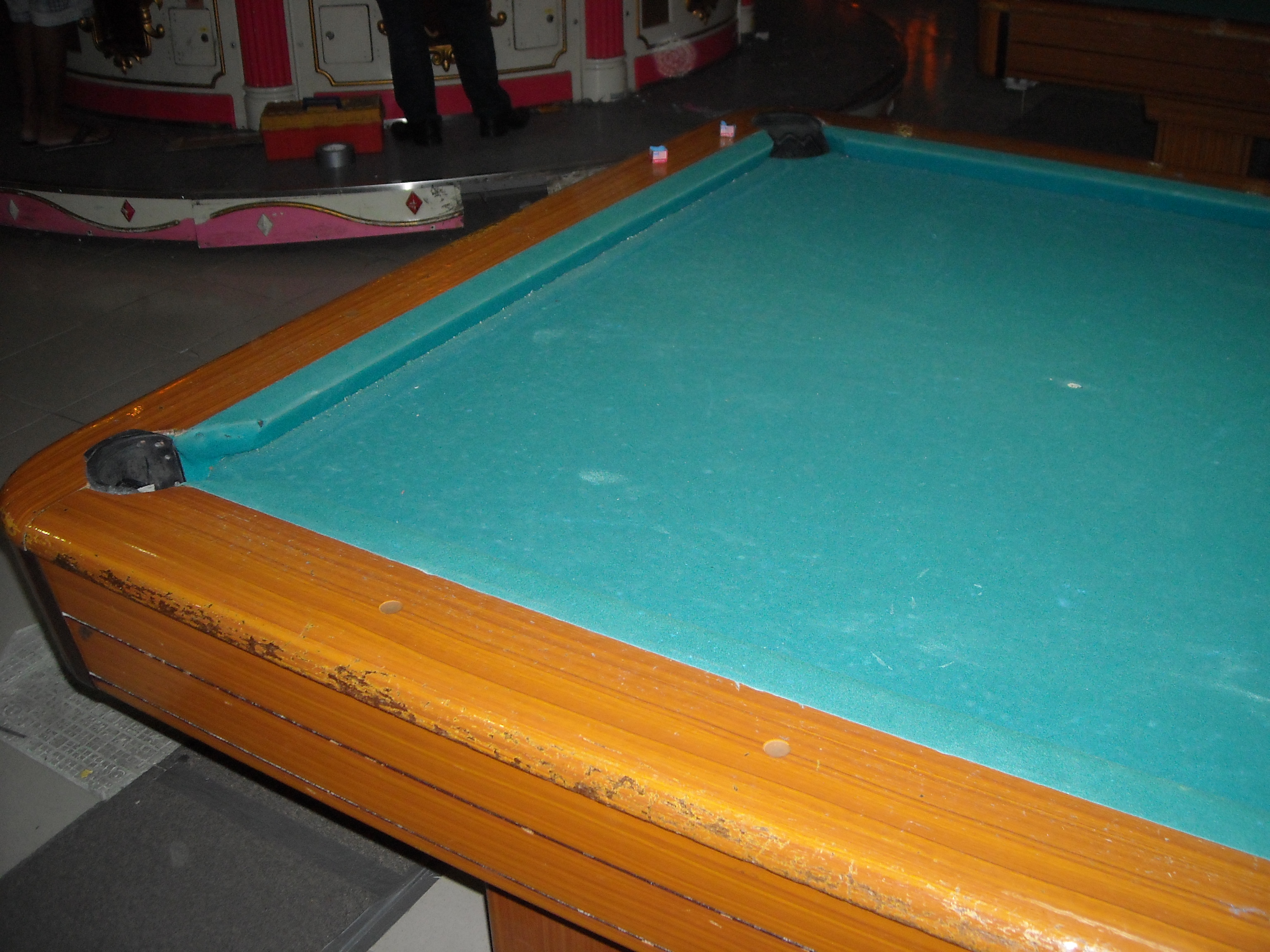
The two top corner pockets, one for each player throughout an entire game

One-pocket is a pool game. Only one pocket for each player is used in this game, unlike other games played on a pool table where any pocket can be used to score object balls. The object of the game is to score points. A point is made when a player pockets any object ball into their designated pocket. The winner is the first to score an agreed-upon number of points (usually 8).

One-pocket is similar to straight pool in that a player can shoot at any object ball regardless of its color or number. Unlike straight pool, however, a shooter does not need to call their shots.

Penalties for a foul are the loss of 1 point, re-spotting a previously pocketed ball if possible, and in the case of a scratch, the incoming player gets ball-in-hand behind the head string. Three consecutive fouls is a loss of game. If a player pockets an object ball in a pocket other than those at the top of the table, their turn ends and that object ball is respotted, unless an object ball is also potted into their designated pocket on the same shot. If the player pockets an object ball in the opponent's pocket, their turn also ends and the opponent earns a point.

== History ==
The first one-pocket tournament was held in 1961, promoted by the Jansco brothers. The winner of the event was Johnny Vives. Hayden W. Lingo, author of the first published rules on one-pocket, wrote the rules adopted as the basis for the tournament rules.

American pool player and entertainer Rudolph "Minnesota Fats" Wanderone allegedly said the game of one-pocket was like chess (later admitting that he had actually never played a game of chess). On the other hand, Wanderone's public rival, Willie Mosconi, called one-pocket a gimmick game for gamblers.

Well known one pocket players and commentators such as Hall of famer Danny DiLiberto, Accu-Stats host Billy Incardona, and Mosconi Cup coach Jeremy Jones have often compared the game to chess, with a beginning, middle, and end game, and similar strategic elements. A player must be careful not to leave the opponent with a good shot, or the opponent may capitalize on a successful shot for successive shots and never let the original player shoot again. A player may even intentionally pocket a ball into their opponent’s pocket, thereby conceding a point, in order to prevent the opponent from being able to pocket that ball and use it to get shape (ideal cue ball position) on a subsequent shot.

The game is very popular with gamblers and frequently attracts high stakes. One-pocket plays a major role in the yearly Derby City Classic held near Louisville, Kentucky, each January.

One of the most famous players of the game is Grady "the Professor" Mathews, who has written articles and published numerous instructional videos on the game. The two main reference works on one-pocket are Winning One-Pocket and One-Pocket Shots, Moves and Strategies, both written by player and gambler, Eddie Robins.

Another well-known one-pocket player is Efren Reyes. His victories in the game include the Galveston World Classic One Pocket (2009) and the US Open One-pocket Championship (2000, 2011) and the Derby City One-pocket event (1999, 2004–2007 and 2014).

One-pocket was the main game featured in the 2007 film, Turn the River, the story of a female pool hustler who plays high-stakes pool. The film ends with a nine-ball match, with the main character saying that nine-ball "seems like a chumpy game for us."

== Set up and break ==
The balls in a one-pocket rack are placed randomly, similar to straight pool and bank pool. Before the break shot, the player breaking (typically after winning the lag or coin flip) chooses a foot corner pocket for the rest of the game; all of that shooter's balls must be shot into that pocket. All of the opponent's balls must be made in the other foot corner pocket.

== Handicapping ==
One-pocket is a very flexible game for players of different skill levels, and many variations are used to handicap a game. The stronger player, for instance, might need 10 points to win versus 6 points for the weaker player (called a "10-6 spot"). Also, as the break shot is so critical in the game, spotting someone the breaks can be a very strong equalizer.

Handicapping one player by allowing points to be scored on bank and kick shots only is a particularly challenging spot, as the free-scoring opponent has a much greater variety of options for both balls to pocket and safeties (defensive positioning of the cue ball after a shot) to play against the opponent.
