= Bank pool =

Pool game

- Highest governing body: World Pool Association
- Nicknames: Banks
- First played: 1930s

Characteristics
- Contact: No
- Team members: single competitors
- Mixed-sex: No
- Equipment: Cue sports equipment
- Glossary: glossary of cue sports terms

Bank pool is a pool game that has as its most fundamental requirement that all scoring shots in the game must be made by bank shot, sending a called ball off a cushion and into a called pocket.

While the game has multiple variations, the predominant version through much of its history was played with a full fifteen-ball rack, of which the winning player was required to legally pocket eight balls. A shortened version of the game using nine balls of which the players must legally pocket five for the win, often called "nine-ball banks," gained popularity in the 1990s and 2000s and is the subject of international professional competition and televised matches.

== Rack ==
The balls are racked in nine-ball formation (or eight-ball formation if using a full rack), but in no particular order.

On the break shot, at least four balls must hit the rails or else it is an illegal break. Any balls pocketed during the break do not count toward the score and will be spotted after the player's inning ends. Pocketing a ball on the break results in the player continuing to shoot.

On an illegal break, the opponent has the option of requesting a re-rack or accepting the table as-is and may begin shooting.

== Play ==
The key rule is that all shots must involve the (cue ball striking the object ball directly, sending the object ball to one or more cushions on the way to the pocket).

Bank pool is one of the "cleanest" (no "slop") pool games — no kick shots (the object ball must be hit directly with the cueball, without hitting the rail first); no combinations (shots must be cue ball to the object ball, then object ball to the called pocket, and the shooter must call the ball, the rail(s), and the pocket); and the object ball cannot hit another ball on the way to the pocket (no kiss shots).

== Fouls ==
The shooter "owes" the table a ball if they foul — a previously pocketed ball (if any) must be spotted. Any ball pocketed on a foul is spotted in addition to the ball owed. If the cue ball is scratched (pocketed or knocked off the table), it is a foul, and the cue ball must be spotted behind the head string (i.e., in the "kitchen"). Any balls that were sunk on that shot are spotted. If the shooter has not already legally pocketed a ball at the time of the foul, a ball is still owed, which must be spotted after the inning in which it was legally pocketed. If the shooter makes a legal bank shot and another ball goes in accidentally, it is not a foul, but that extra ball is spotted after the inning. It is also a foul if the shooter does not hit the called object ball and drive it or the cue ball to a cushion or pocket the object ball (this is different from nine-ball and standardized eight-ball, in which any ball may contact a rail after the object-ball hit to avoid fouling). In many areas, fouling three times during successive turns means a loss of game, but that rule may often be ignored in local amateur play. A stricter variant preferred by some is that even three non-consecutive fouls is a loss of game. Players typically make sure the rules are clear and agreed-upon before play begins, especially when gambling.
