= 2015 U.S. Open 9-ball Championship =

United States pool championship, held October 2015

Tournament information
- Dates: 25–30 October 2015
- Venue: Marriott Chesapeake
- City: Chesapeake, Virginia
- Country: United States
- Organisation: World Pool-Billiard Association
- Format: Double elimination

Final
- Champion: (Chinese Taipei) Cheng Yu-hsuan
- Runner-up: (England) Karl Boyes
- Score: 13-6

The 2015 US Open 9-Ball Championship 2015 was the 40th U.S. Open 9-ball Championship event in the discipline of 9-Ball. The event was played between 25 and 30 October 2015 in the Marriott Chesapeake in Chesapeake, Virginia, USA. Cheng Yu-hsuan won the event, winning the final 13–6 against Englishman Karl Boyes and became the third Asian player after Efren Reyes (1994) and Alex Pagulayan (2005) to win the US Open.

The previous year's winner Shane van Boening finished in 25th place.

== Tournament format ==
The tournament was played as a Double-elimination tournament. The event was played as winner break, and as a race to 11 for the double elimination event, and race to 13 for the final.

== Ranking ==
The following were the 32 best placed players.

Place	Player
1	(Chinese Taipei) Cheng Yu-hsuan
2	(England) Karl Boyes
3	(China) Liu Haitao
4	(Germany) Ralf Souquet
5	(Scotland) Jayson Shaw
5	(Chinese Taipei) Hsu Kai-lun
7	(Philippines) Dennis Orcollo
7	(Russia) Ruslan Chinakhov
9	(United States) Corey Deuel
9	(United States) Justin Bergman
9	(Philippines) Jundel Mazon
9	(Germany) Oliver Ortmann
13	(United States) Mike Dechaine
13	(Philippines) Jeffrey Ignacio
13	(Philippines) Carlo Biado
13	(United States) Rodney Morris

Place	Player
17	(Philippines) Francisco Felicilda
17	(England) Darren Appleton
17	(Philippines) Warren Kiamco
17	(Finland) Mika Immonen
17	(Estonia) Denis Grabe
17	(Austria) Albin Ouschan
17	(China) Dang Jinhu
17	(China) Li Hewen
25	(England) Daryl Peach
25	(Philippines) Roberto Gomez
25	(United States) Skyler Woodward
25	(Germany) Thorsten Hohmann
25	(United States) Shane Van Boening
25	(Netherlands) Nick van den Berg
25	(Canada) Jason Klatt
25	(Netherlands) Marco Teutscher
