= 2021 Mosconi Cup =

Europe v USA Pool Tournament in 2021

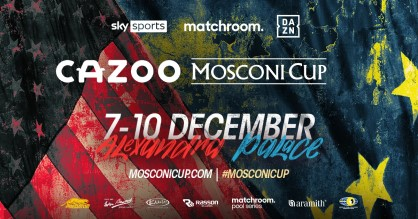
- Dates: 7–10 December 2021
- Venue: Alexandra Palace
- Location: London, England
- Captains: Alex Lely (EU); Jeremy Jones (US)
- MVP: Jayson Shaw
- 11 – 6 Europe retains the Mosconi Cup

The 2021 Mosconi Cup (officially the 2021 Cazoo Mosconi Cup) was the 28th edition of an annual nine-ball pool tournament between teams representing Europe and the United States. It took place between 7 and 10 December 2021 at the Alexandra Palace in London, marking the second consecutive year that the tournament had been staged in England, and the first time since 2002 that the event did not alternate annually between the US and Europe. Sponsored by British online car retailer Cazoo, it was broadcast live on Sky Sports in the UK and on networks worldwide.

Team Europe were the defending champions, having won the previous year's tournament by a scoreline of 11–3. Alex Lely and Karl Boyes again served as Team Europe's non-playing captain and vice-captain, while Jeremy Jones again captained Team USA, with Shane Van Boening promoted to playing vice-captain. Earl Strickland, selected to play on Team USA for the first time since 2013, was forced to withdraw after he came into close contact with a case of COVID-19 on his flight to the UK. Jones, who had intended to act as non-playing captain, came out of retirement to take Strickland's place on the players' roster.

The teams were level at 2–2 after the first session. Team USA won three of the first four matches in the second session to lead 5–3, and looked likely to extend their lead when Jones and Chris Reinhold won four of the first five racks against Europe's Eklent Kaçi and David Alcaide. However, the Europeans fought back to win the match with four consecutive racks, leaving Team USA with a 5–4 overnight lead. Team Europe surged ahead in the third session, winning all five matches. In the final match of the session, with Jones and Alcaide locked in an intense safety battle in the deciding rack, Jones asked referee Marcel Eckardt to clean the cue ball with 12 seconds remaining on his shot clock, mistakenly believing that the clock would be stopped while the ball was cleaned. With no extensions remaining, Jones incurred a time foul, giving Alcaide ball in hand to run out the rack for a session whitewash. Leading 9–5 going into the final day, Team Europe won two of the last three matches to retain the Mosconi Cup by a scoreline of 11–6, giving Europe the overall series lead at 14–13, with one tie. Jayson Shaw was Most Valuable Player, making him only the third player in Mosconi Cup history to be MVP for two consecutive years.

== Teams ==
Team Europe
Name	Nationality	Notes
David Alcaide	Spain
Joshua Filler	Germany
Jayson Shaw	Scotland	Most Valuable Player
Albin Ouschan	Austria
Eklent Kaçi	Albania
Alex Lely	Netherlands	Non-playing Captain
Karl Boyes	England	Non-playing Vice-captain

Team USA
Name	State of birth	Notes
Earl Strickland	North Carolina	Withdrew
Skyler Woodward	Kentucky
Chris Reinhold (Note: Reinhold competed for Team USA in 2020 under the name Chris Robinson. He adopted his stepfather's last name in the interim.)	California
Tyler Styer	Wisconsin
Jeremy Jones	Texas	Playing Captain
Shane Van Boening	South Dakota	Playing Vice-captain

== Results ==
=== Tuesday, 7 December ===
	Results
Teams; Team Europe	2–5	Teams; Team USA
Doubles Ouschan & Kaçi	4–5	Doubles Styer & Reinhold
Singles Joshua Filler	5–2	Singles Shane Van Boening
Doubles Alcaide & Shaw	5–0	Doubles Woodward & Jones
2	Session	2
2	Overall	2

=== Wednesday, 8 December ===
	Results
Singles Jayson Shaw	5–3	Singles Shane Van Boening
Singles Albin Ouschan	3–5	Singles Skyler Woodward
Doubles Ouschan & Shaw	4–5	Doubles Van Boening & Woodward
Singles Joshua Filler	3–5	Singles Tyler Styer
Doubles Alcaide & Kaçi	5–4	Doubles Reinhold & Jones
2	Session	3
4	Overall	5

=== Thursday, 9 December ===
	Results
Singles Jayson Shaw	5–2	Singles Chris Reinhold
Doubles Shaw & Filler	5–2	Doubles Styer & Woodward
Singles Eklent Kaçi	5–3	Singles Shane Van Boening
Doubles Ouschan & Alcaide	5–1	Doubles Styer & Van Boening
Singles David Alcaide	5–4	Singles Jeremy Jones
5	Session	0
9	Overall	5

=== Friday, 10 December ===
	Results
Doubles Shaw & Filler	5-4	Doubles Woodward & Van Boening
Singles Jayson Shaw	2–5	Singles Skyler Woodward
Singles Joshua Filler	5–4	Singles Shane Van Boening
2	Session	1
11	Overall	6
