= 2018 World Pool Masters =

World Pool Masters XXV
Tournament information
- Dates: 2–4 March 2018
- Venue: Tercentenary Sports Hall, Victoria Stadium
- City: Gibraltar
- Organisation: Matchroom Sport
- Format: Invitational event
- Total prize fund: $80,000
- Winner's share: $20,000

Final
- Champion: (Netherlands) Niels Feijen
- Runner-up: (United States) Shane Van Boening
- Score: 8–4

The 2018 World Pool Masters, also known as World Pool Masters XXV, was a nine-ball pool tournament that took place in Gibraltar between 2–4 March 2018. It was the 25th edition of the invitational tournament organised by Matchroom Sport.

Dutchman Niels Feijen defeated Shane Van Boening of the United States in the final to win the title for the second time in his career.

== Tournament prize money ==
	Prize money
Winner	20.000 US$
Runner-up	10.000 US$
Semi-finalist	5.000 US$
Quarter-finalist	4.000 US$
First round loser	3.000 US$
Total	80.000 US$

== Players ==
16 players took part in the tournament, including 12 former champions. Two other former champions – Tony Drago and Francisco Bustamante – had been scheduled to take part, but withdrew before the start of the competition and were replaced by Karl Boyes and Joshua Filler. Spain's David Alcaide defended the title he won in 2017, but was defeated in the first round by Karl Boyes.

== Tournament ==
=== Seeds ===
China's Wu Jia-qing withdrew prior to the start of the competition, and was replaced in the draw by England's Chris Melling.

1. (Spain) David Alcaide (first round)
2. (Scotland) Jayson Shaw (semifinals)
3. (United States) Shane Van Boening (final)
4. (China) ~~Wu Jia-qing~~ (withdrew)
5. (Netherlands) Niels Feijen (champion)
6. (England) Darren Appleton (quarterfinals)
7. (Canada) Alex Pagulayan (quarterfinals)
8. (Germany) Ralf Souquet (quarterfinals)

=== Draw ===
The draw for the tournament was made on 30 January.

First round
1	(Spain) David Alcaide	3
(England) Karl Boyes	8
8	(Germany) Ralf Souquet	8
(Poland) Karol Skowerski	4
5	(Netherlands) Niels Feijen	8
(India) Raj Hundal	2
(England) Chris Melling	3
(Philippines) Dennis Orcollo	8
3	(United States) Shane Van Boening	8
(England) Daryl Peach	2
6	(England) Darren Appleton	8
(United States) Earl Strickland	6
7	(Canada) Alex Pagulayan	8
(Netherlands) Alex Lely	4
2	(Scotland) Jayson Shaw	8
(Germany) Joshua Filler	5

Quarterfinals
(England) Karl Boyes	8
8	(Germany) Ralf Souquet	7
5	(Netherlands) Niels Feijen	8
(Philippines) Dennis Orcollo	6
3	(United States) Shane Van Boening	8
6	(England) Darren Appleton	4
7	(Canada) Alex Pagulayan	5
2	(Scotland) Jayson Shaw	8

Semifinals
(England) Karl Boyes	3
5	(Netherlands) Niels Feijen	8
3	(United States) Shane Van Boening	8
2	(Scotland) Jayson Shaw	3

Final
5	(Netherlands) Niels Feijen	8
3	(United States) Shane Van Boening	4
