= 2016 Mosconi Cup =

- Dates: 6–9 December
- Venue: Alexandra Palace
- Location: London, England
- Captains: Marcus Chamat (EU); Mark Wilson (US)
- MVP: Albin Ouschan (EU)
- 11 – 3

The 2016 Betfair Mosconi Cup, the 23rd edition of the annual nine-ball pool competition between teams representing Europe and the United States, took place 6–9 December 2016 at the Alexandra Palace in London, England.

== Teams ==
Team Europe
Name	Nationality	Notes
Niels Feijen	Netherlands
Jayson Shaw	United Kingdom
Mark Gray	United Kingdom
Albin Ouschan	Austria	Most Valuable Player
Darren Appleton	United Kingdom
Marcus Chamat	Sweden	Non-playing captain

Team USA
Name	State of birth	Notes
Shane Van Boening	South Dakota
Skyler Woodward	Kentucky
Mike Dechaine	Maine
Justin Bergman	Illinois
Rodney Morris	California
Mark Wilson	Missouri	Non-playing captain

== Results ==
=== Tuesday, 6 December ===
Day review:

	Results
Teams; Team Europe	5–2	Teams; Team USA
Doubles; Mark Gray; Albin Ouschan	5–2	Doubles; Shane Van Boening; Rodney Morris
Singles; Niels Feijen	5–2	Singles; Mike Dechaine
Doubles; Jayson Shaw; Darren Appleton	1–5	Doubles; Skyler Woodward; Justin Bergman
Singles; Darren Appleton	5–3	Singles; Shane Van Boening
4	Session	1
4	Overall	1

=== Wednesday, 7 December ===
Day review:

	Results
Doubles; Niels Feijen; Mark Gray	5–2	Doubles; Shane Van Boening; Skyler Woodward
Singles; Jayson Shaw	3–5	Singles; Rodney Morris
Doubles; Albin Ouschan; Darren Appleton	5–4	Doubles; Mike Dechaine; Justin Bergman
Singles; Mark Gray	5–1	Singles; Justin Bergman
3	Session	1
7	Overall	2

=== Thursday, 8 December ===
Day review:

	Results
Doubles; Darren Appleton; Niels Feijen	5–2	Doubles; Mike Dechaine; Shane Van Boening
Doubles; Jayson Shaw; Albin Ouschan	5–3	Doubles; Rodney Morris; Skyler Woodward
Singles; Albin Ouschan	5–4	Singles; Skyler Woodward
Doubles; Mark Gray; Darren Appleton	4–5	Doubles; Justin Bergman; Rodney Morris
3	Session	1
10	Overall	3

=== Friday, 9 December ===
Day review:

	Results
Singles; Jayson Shaw	5–1	Singles; Mike Dechaine
1	Session	0
11	Overall	3
