= Johan Ruijsink =

Belgian-born Dutch pool manager

Personal information
- Born: 21 December 1965 (age 60) Zierikzee, Netherlands

Pool career
- Country: Netherlands
- Pool games: Nine-ball

Johan Ruijsink (born 21 December 1965) is a Dutch professional pool manager and coach who captained both the European and American teams at the Mosconi Cup. He captained the European team to draw the 2006 Mosconi Cup, and later won six events between 2007 and 2014, going undefeated as European captain. Ruijsink took over as American captain in 2017, and won the 2018 and 2019 Mosconi Cup events.

Ruijsink is the only non-playing captain to win the Mosconi Cup as a part of both the European and United States teams. Despite competing at 9 Mosconi Cup events, Ruijsink's only loss came as American captain to his European replacement Marcus Chamat at the 2017 Mosconi Cup.

== Career ==
Johan Ruijsink was born 21 December 1965, and began coaching pool players in the early 90s, credited with empowering Netherlands' pool players, such as Niels Feijen and Alex Lely, and later Russian players such as Ruslan Chinakhov and Konstantin Stepanov.

Ruijsink took control of the European team for the Mosconi Cup in 2007. The European team won one event in the preceding ten years, and under Ruijsink won seven times between 2007 and 2014. In 2014, Ruijsink left his post as European captain, to be replaced by Swedish player Marcus Chamat.

Three years later for the 2017 event, Ruijsink took over as captain of the American team, losing 4–11 to successor Chamat. The following year, leading the American team (alongside vice-captain Jeremy Jones), and would defeat Chamat, and win the 2018 Mosconi Cup 9–11. He took charge of the American team once more in 2019 winning 11–9. Despite this, he was not invited to retain the position for the 2020 Mosconi Cup, being replaced by Jones. As of 2023, Ruijsink is the only person to captain both squads.

== Achievements ==
- 2019 Mosconi Cup Captain
- 2018 Mosconi Cup Captain
- 2014 Mosconi Cup Captain
- 2013 Mosconi Cup Captain
- 2012 Mosconi Cup Captain
- 2011 Mosconi Cup Captain
- 2010 Mosconi Cup Captain
- 2007 Mosconi Cup Captain
