= 2022 Mosconi Cup =

Europe v USA Pool Tournament in 2022

- Dates: 30 November–3 December 2022
- Venue: Bally's Las Vegas
- Location: Las Vegas, Nevada, United States
- Captains: Jeremy Jones (US); Alex Lely (EU)
- MVP: Joshua Filler
- 7 – 11; Europe retains the Mosconi Cup

The 2022 Mosconi Cup was the 29th edition of an annual nine-ball pool tournament between teams representing Europe and the United States. It took place between 30 November and 3 December 2022 at Bally's Las Vegas in Las Vegas, Nevada, the first time since 2019 that the tournament was staged in the United States. It was broadcast live on Sky Sports in the UK and on networks worldwide.

Going into the event, Team Europe were two-time defending champions, having won their second consecutive tournament in 2021 by a scoreline of 11–6.

== Teams ==
Team Europe
Name	Nationality	Notes
Joshua Filler	Germany	Most Valuable Player
Francisco Sánchez Ruiz	Spain
Albin Ouschan	Austria
Jayson Shaw	Scotland	Playing Vice-captain
David Alcaide	Spain
Alex Lely	Netherlands	Non-Playing Captain

Team USA
Name	State of birth	Notes
Shane Van Boening	South Dakota
Oscar Dominguez	California
Skyler Woodward	Kentucky	Playing Vice-captain
Tyler Styer	Wisconsin
Earl Strickland	North Carolina
Jeremy Jones	Texas	Non-Playing Captain

== Results ==
=== Wednesday, 30 November ===
	Results
Teams Team Europe	3–5	Teams Team USA
Doubles Sanchez Ruiz/Alcaide	5–1	Doubles Dominguez/Strickland
Singles Joshua Filler	4–5	Singles Skyler Woodward
Doubles Ouschan/Shaw	4–5	Doubles Van Boening/Styer
1	Session	3
1	Overall	3

=== Thursday, 1 December ===
	Results
Singles Jayson Shaw	5-3	Singles Earl Strickland
Singles Joshua Filler	5-3	Singles Shane Van Boening
Doubles Filler/Ouschan	5-3	Doubles Styer/Dominguez
Singles Francisco Sánchez Ruiz	2-5	Singles Skyler Woodward
3	Session	1
4	Overall	4

=== Friday, 2 December ===
	Results
Doubles Shaw/Alcaide	4-5	Doubles Van Boening/Strickland
Singles David Alcaide	5-2	Singles Tyler Styer
Doubles Sanchez Ruiz/Filler	5-2	Doubles Woodward/Strickland
Singles Albin Ouschan	5-2	Singles Earl Strickland
Doubles Shaw/Filler	0-5	Doubles Van Boening/Woodward
Singles Jayson Shaw	5-2	Singles Oscar Dominguez
4	Session	2
8	Overall	6

=== Saturday, 3 December ===
	Results
Doubles Sanchez Ruiz/Alcaide	3-5	Doubles Woodward/Van Boening
Singles David Alcaide	5-3	Singles Skyler Woodward
Singles Jayson Shaw	5-3	Singles Shane Van Boening
Singles Joshua Filler	5-3	Singles Tyler Styer
3	Session	1
11	Overall	7
