= 2015 Mosconi Cup =

- Dates: 7–10 December
- Venue: Tropicana
- Location: Las Vegas, Nevada
- Captains: Mark Wilson (US); Marcus Chamat (EU)
- MVP: Niels Feijen (EU)
- 7 – 11; Europe wins the Mosconi Cup

The 2015 PartyPoker.net Mosconi Cup, the 22nd edition of the annual nine-ball pool competition between teams representing Europe and the United States, took place 7–10 December 2015 at the Tropicana in Las Vegas, Nevada.

Team Europe retained the Mosconi Cup by defeating Team USA 11–7.

== Teams ==
Team USA
Name	State of birth	Notes
Shane Van Boening	South Dakota
Corey Deuel	Florida
Mike Dechaine	Maine
Justin Bergman	Illinois
Skyler Woodward	Kentucky
Mark Wilson	Missouri	Non-playing captain

Team Europe
Name	Nationality	Notes
Niels Feijen	Netherlands	Most Valued Player
Darren Appleton	United Kingdom
Albin Ouschan	Austria
Karl Boyes	United Kingdom
Nick van den Berg	Netherlands
Marcus Chamat	Sweden	Non-playing captain

== Results ==
=== Monday, 7 December ===
Day review:

	Results
Teams; Team USA	5–4	Teams; Team Europe
Doubles; Corey Deuel; Mike Dechaine	4–5	Doubles; Karl Boyes; Nick van den Berg
Singles; Justin Bergman	2–5	Singles; Niels Feijen
Doubles; Shane Van Boening; Skyler Woodward	5–1	Doubles; Darren Appleton; Albin Ouschan
Singles; Shane Van Boening	1–5	Singles; Darren Appleton
2	Session	3
2	Overall	3

=== Tuesday, 8 December ===
Day review:

	Results
Doubles; Justin Bergman; Skyler Woodward	5–3	Doubles; Niels Feijen; Nick van den Berg
Singles; Mike Dechaine	3–5	Singles; Albin Ouschan
Doubles; Shane Van Boening; Corey Deuel	2–5	Doubles; Darren Appleton; Karl Boyes
Singles; Skyler Woodward	3–5	Singles; Karl Boyes
Doubles; Shane Van Boening; Mike Dechaine	5–4	Doubles; Darren Appleton; Nick van den Berg
2	Session	3
4	Overall	6

=== Wednesday, 9 December ===
Day review:

	Results
Doubles; Justin Bergman; Corey Deuel	1–5	Doubles; Niels Feijen; Albin Ouschan
Singles; Corey Deuel	5–4	Singles; Nick van den Berg
Doubles; Mike Dechaine; Skyler Woodward	2–5	Doubles; Karl Boyes; Albin Ouschan
Singles; Shane Van Boening	4–5	Singles; Niels Feijen
Singles; Justin Bergman	5–2	Singles; Darren Appleton
2	Session	3
6	Overall	9

=== Thursday, 10 December ===
Day review:

	Results
Singles; Justin Bergman	4–5	Singles; Niels Feijen
Singles; Shane Van Boening	5–4	Singles; Karl Boyes
Singles; Skyler Woodward	4–5	Singles; Albin Ouschan
1	Session	2
7	Overall	11
