= 2010 WPA World Eight-ball Championship =

WPA World 8-Ball Championship 2010
Tournament information
- Sport: Eight-ball
- Location: Fujairah, United Arab Emirates
- Dates: April 4, 2010–April 10, 2010
- Tournament format: Double Elimination / Single Elimination
- Host: WPA World Eight-ball Championship
- Venue: Fujairah Exhibition Centre, Al Diar Siji Hotel
- Participants: 64

Final positions
- Champion: (England) Karl Boyes
- Runner-up: (Netherlands) Niels Feijen

The 2010 WPA World Eight-ball Championship was an eight-ball world championship, organized by the World Pool-Billiard Association (WPA), and held 4–10 April 2010 at the Fujairah Exhibition Centre of the Al Diar Siji Hotel in Fujairah, United Arab Emirates. A total of 64 players competed in the tournament.

The event was won by Englishman Karl Boyes, who defeated Niels Feijen in the final 13–12.

== Tournament summary ==
The event was split into two sections, a double elimination round, splitting the field from 64 to 32, and then a traditional knockout round. In this round, former two time 9-Ball world champion Thorsten Hohmann lost to Masaaki Tanaka 8–7, thanks to a miscue in the final rack.

David Alcaide also lost in this round of the tournament, despite being 5–3 ahead of Oliver Medenillia; he would lose 8–6. Mika Immonen lost in the round of 32 to Ruslan Chinakhov. Chinachov would make it to the semi-finals where he would lose to Karl Boyes, whilst Feijen would overcome Darren Appleton.

In the final, Boyes had the much better start and led Fiejen 4-0 and 11–5, before his opponent started a catch-up and levelled at 12-12. Boyes won the final rack, winning 13–12.

=== Tournament bracket ===
Round of 32; 7. April 2010
5	(Singapore) Ricky Yang	8
20	(Philippines) Jeff de Luna	10
(Philippines) Dennis Orcollo	9
4	(Philippines) Lee Vann Corteza	10
19	(Russia) Ruslan Chinakhov	10
1	(Finland) Mika Immonen	5
(France) Francis Crevier	6
13	(Japan) Yukio Akakariyama	10
(Philippines) Ronato Alcano	10
(England) Scott Higgins	3
(Philippines) Venancio Tanio	10
(Jordan) Jalal al-Saresi	6
9	(England) Karl Boyes	10
(Japan) Masaaki Tanaka	3
(Chinese Taipei) Chang Pei-Wei	5
(France) Stephan Cohen	10
2	(Germany) Ralf Souquet	10
(Netherlands) Huidji See	0
(Qatar) Bashar Hussain	5
7	(Netherlands) Niels Feijen	10
(Germany) Andreas Roschkowsky	10
(Poland) Mateusz Śniegocki	7
8	(Sweden) Marcus Chamat	10
11	(United States) Shane Van Boening	1
(Philippines) Raymund Faraon	1
(Chinese Taipei) Ko Pin-yi	10
(Canada) John Morra	4
3	(England) Darren Appleton	10
17	(Philippines) Antonio Gabica	10
10	(Philippines) Marlon Manalo	6
(Philippines) Oliver Medinilla	3
(Philippines) Joven Alba	10

Round of 16; 8. April 2010
20	(Philippines) Jeffrey de Luna	10
4	(Philippines) Lee Vann Corteza	2
19	(Russia) Ruslan Tschinachow	10
13	(Japan) Yukio Akakariyama	7
(Philippines) Ronato Alcano	4
(Philippines) Venancio Tanio	10
9	(England) Karl Boyes	10
(France) Stephan Cohen	6
2	(Germany) Ralf Souquet	9
7	(Netherlands) Niels Feijen	10
(Germany) Andreas Roschkowsky	10
8	(Sweden) Marcus Chamat	6
(Chinese Taipei) Ko Pin-yi	8
3	(England) Darren Appleton	10
17	(Philippines) Antonio Gabica	8
(Philippines) Joven Alba	10

QuarterFinal; 9. April 2010
20	(Philippines) Jeffrey de Luna	5
19	(Russia) Ruslan Tschinachow	10
(Philippines) Venancio Tanio	5
9	(England) Karl Boyes	10
7	(Netherlands) Niels Feijen	10
(Germany) Andreas Roschkowsky	6
3	(England) Darren Appleton	10
(Philippines) Joven Alba	8

SemiFinal; 9. April 2010
19	(Russia) Ruslan Tschinachow	2
9	(England) Karl Boyes	10
7	(Netherlands) Niels Feijen	10
3	(England) Darren Appleton	6

Final; 10. April 2010
9	(England) Karl Boyes	13
7	(Netherlands) Niels Feijen	12
