= 2014 U.S. Open 9-ball Championship =

Tournament information
- Dates: 12–18 October 2014
- Venue: Marriott Chesapeake
- City: Chesapeake
- Country: United States
- Organisation: World Pool-Billiard Association
- Format: Double elimination

Final
- Champion: (United States) Shane Van Boening
- Runner-up: (Philippines) Dennis Orcollo

The 2014 US Open 9-Ball Championship was the 39th edition the U.S. Open 9-Ball Championships. The event took place between 12-18 October 2014 in Marriott Chesapeake in Chesapeake, Virginia, USA.

The winner of the tournament was Shane Van Boening winning 13-10 in the final against Dennis Orcollo. This was Van Boening's fourth title after having won the tournament in 2007, 2012 and 2013. This was also Van Boening's third championship in a row, which had never been done before. In total, the event had a total prize pool of $178,000, with the winner receiving 24,000 US dollars.

== Tournament format ==
The tournament was played as a Double-elimination tournament. In the preliminary round was played until one of the two players 11 games (so-called. Racks) had won; in the final was played to 13. The event was played as winner breaks.

== Ranking ==
The following were the 32 best placed players.

Place	Player
1	(United States) Shane Van Boening
2	(Philippines) Dennis Orcollo
3	(Greece) Nikos Ekonomopoulos
4	(United States) Mike Dechaine
5	(Philippines) Warren Kiamco
5	(Philippines) Francisco Bustamante
7	(United States) Justin Hall
7	(Canada) Jason Klatt
9	(Mexico) Ernesto Domínguez
9	(Germany) Thorsten Hohmann
9	(England) Karl Boyes
9	(England) Darren Appleton
13	(Philippines) Efren Reyes
13	(United States) Chris Futrell
13	(England) Daryl Peach
13	(Vietnam) Do Hoang Quan

Place	Player
17	(Japan) Kenichi Uchigaki
17	(Canada) John Morra
17	(Greece) Alexander Kazakis
17	(United States) Justin Bergman
17	(United States) Corey Deuel
17	(Qatar) Waleed Majid
17	(Netherlands) Nick van den Berg
17	(Netherlands) Niels Feijen
25	(China) Li Hewen
25	(United States) Jeremy Sossei
25	(United States) Jonathan Pinegar
25	(United States) Earl Strickland
25	(Philippines) Rodrigo Geronimo
25	(China) Liu Haitao
25	(United States) Chris Bruner
25	(India) Raj Hundal
