= 2012 Mosconi Cup =

- Dates: 10–13 December
- Venue: York Hall
- Location: Bethnal Green, London, England
- Captains: Johan Ruijsink (EU); C.J. Wiley (US)
- MVP: Chris Melling (EU)
- 11 – 9 Europe wins the Mosconi Cup

The 2012 Mosconi Cup, the 19th edition of the annual nine-ball pool competition between teams representing Europe and the United States, took place 10–13 December 2012 at the York Hall in Bethnal Green, London, England.

Team Europe won the Mosconi Cup by defeating Team USA 11–9.

== Teams ==
Team USA
Name	State of birth	Notes
Johnny Archer	Georgia
Mike Dechaine	Maine
Dennis Hatch	New York
Brandon Shuff	Virginia
Shane Van Boening	South Dakota
C.J. Wiley	Texas	Non-playing captain

Team Europe
Name	Nationality	Notes
Darren Appleton	United Kingdom
Nikos Ekonomopoulos	Greece
Niels Feijen	Netherlands
Chris Melling	United Kingdom	Most Valued Player
Nick van den Berg	Netherlands
Johan Ruijsink	Netherlands	Non-playing captain

== Results ==
=== Monday, 10 December ===
	Results
Teams; Team Europe	3–5	Teams; Team USA
Doubles; Chris Melling; Nick van den Berg	4–5	Doubles; Johnny Archer; Brandon Shuff
Singles; Niels Feijen	5–0	Singles; Mike Dechaine
Doubles; Darren Appleton; Nikos Ekonomopoulos	4–5	Doubles; Dennis Hatch; Shane Van Boening
Singles; Darren Appleton	5–2	Singles; Brandon Shuff
2	Session	3
2	Overall	3

=== Tuesday, 11 December ===
	Results
Doubles; Darren Appleton; Chris Melling	4–5	Doubles; Johnny Archer; Mike Dechaine
Singles; Nikos Ekonomopoulos	5–3	Singles; Shane Van Boening
Doubles; Niels Feijen; Nick van den Berg	5–2	Doubles; Dennis Hatch; Brandon Shuff
Singles; Chris Melling	5–3	Singles; Dennis Hatch
Doubles; Darren Appleton; Niels Feijen	4–5	Doubles; Shane Van Boening; Johnny Archer
3	Session	2
5	Overall	5

=== Wednesday, 12 December ===
	Results
Doubles; Nick van den Berg; Nikos Ekonomopoulos	5–4	Doubles; Mike Dechaine; Brandon Shuff
Singles; Nick van den Berg	4–5	Singles; Johnny Archer
Doubles; Nikos Ekonomopoulos; Niels Feijen	5–4	Doubles; Dennis Hatch; Mike Dechaine
Singles; Chris Melling	5–2	Singles; Brandon Shuff
Singles; Darren Appleton	5–0	Singles; Shane Van Boening
4	Session	1
9	Overall	6

=== Thursday, 13 December ===
	Results
Singles; Nikos Ekonomopoulos	3–5	Singles; Dennis Hatch
Singles; Niels Feijen	1–5	Singles; Johnny Archer
Singles; Darren Appleton	1–5	Singles; Shane Van Boening
Singles; Chris Melling	5–2	Singles; Brandon Shuff
Singles; Nick van den Berg	5–2	Singles; Mike Dechaine
2	Session	3
11	Overall	9
