= 2014 Mosconi Cup =

English nine-ball pool competition

- Dates: 1–4 December
- Venue: Tower Circus
- Location: Blackpool, England
- Captains: Johan Ruijsink (EU); Mark Wilson (US)
- MVP: Niels Feijen
- 11 – 5 Europe wins the Mosconi Cup

The 2014 partypoker Mosconi Cup, the 21st edition of the annual nine-ball pool competition between teams representing Europe and the United States, took place 1–4 December 2014 at the Tower Circus in Blackpool, England.

== Teams ==
Team Europe
Name	Nationality	Notes
Darren Appleton	United Kingdom
Karl Boyes	United Kingdom
Nikos Ekonomopoulos	Greece
Niels Feijen	Netherlands	Most Valuable Player
Mark Gray	United Kingdom
Johan Ruijsink	Netherlands	Non-playing captain

Team USA
Name	State of birth	Notes
Justin Bergman	Illinois
Corey Deuel	California
Justin Hall	Illinois
John Schmidt	California
Shane Van Boening	South Dakota
Mark Wilson	Missouri	Non-playing captain

== Results ==
=== Monday, 1 December ===
Day review:

	Results
Teams; Team Europe	5–1	Teams; Team USA
Doubles; Darren Appleton; Karl Boyes	3–5	Doubles; Corey Deuel; Justin Hall
Singles; Mark Gray	3–5	Singles; John Schmidt
Doubles; Niels Feijen; Nikos Ekonomopoulos	5–1	Doubles; Shane Van Boening; Justin Bergman
Singles; Darren Appleton	5–3	Singles; Shane Van Boening
3	Session	2
3	Overall	2

=== Tuesday, 2 December ===
Day review:

	Results
Doubles; Niels Feijen; Mark Gray	2–5	Doubles; Justin Bergman; Justin Hall
Singles; Karl Boyes	5–2	Singles; Corey Deuel
Doubles; Darren Appleton; Nikos Ekonomopoulos	5–2	Doubles; Shane Van Boening; John Schmidt
Singles; Niels Feijen	5–3	Singles; Justin Bergman
Doubles; Darren Appleton; Mark Gray	4–5	Doubles; Shane Van Boening; Corey Deuel
3	Session	2
6	Overall	4

=== Wednesday, 3 December ===
Day review:

	Results
Doubles; Karl Boyes; Nikos Ekonomopoulos	5–3	Doubles; Justin Hall; John Schmidt
Singles; Nikos Ekonomopoulos	3–5	Singles; Justin Hall
Doubles; Karl Boyes; Mark Gray	5–3	Doubles; Corey Deuel; John Schmidt
Singles; Niels Feijen	5–2	Singles; Justin Bergman
3	Session	1
9	Overall	5

=== Thursday, 4 December ===
Day review:

	Results
Singles; Darren Appleton	5–2	Singles; Shane Van Boening
Singles; Nikos Ekonomopoulos	5–2	Singles; Shane Van Boening
2	Session	0
11	Overall	5
