= 2018 Mosconi Cup =

Nine-ball pool competition

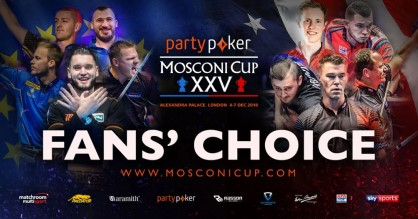
- Dates: 4–7 December
- Venue: Alexandra Palace
- Location: London, England
- Captains: Marcus Chamat (EU); Johan Ruijsink (US)
- MVP: Skyler Woodward (US)
- 9 – 11 USA wins the Mosconi Cup

The 2018 Mosconi Cup, (also known as Mosconi Cup XXV) was the 25th edition of the annual nine-ball pool competition between teams representing Europe and the United States. It took place between 4–7 December 2018 at the Alexandra Palace in London, England and was sponsored by partypoker.

The reigning champions were team Europe, who had won the last eight cups, including the 2017 Mosconi Cup 11–4. The event was played with teams of 5, decided by captains, and also performances in the tour. The team's non-playing captains were the same as the previous year: Marcus Chamat for Europe and Johan Ruijsink for the United States. Ruijsink, who had won the Cup as captain with team Europe seven times, was assisted by vice captain Jeremy Jones.

The United States won the Mosconi Cup for the first time since 2009, defeating Europe 11–9, ending an 8-year losing streak for the USA.

== Teams ==
The European qualification process saw players play to be picked in the top three places in the European rankings. This initially resulted in the selection of Eklent Kaçi, Mario He and Niels Feijen to Team Europe, who were subsequently joined by the wildcard picks of Albin Ouschan and Jayson Shaw. However, a statement released on 21 November 2018 announced that Mario He had stepped down from the side following a failed drugs test and would be replaced by the next highest-ranked player on the Euro Tour, Alexander Kazakis.

Team Europe
Name	Nationality	Notes
Eklent Kaçi	Albania
Alexander Kazakis	Greece
Niels Feijen	Netherlands
Albin Ouschan	Austria
Jayson Shaw	United Kingdom
Marcus Chamat	Sweden	Non-playing captain

Team USA
Name	State of birth	Notes
Skyler Woodward	Kentucky	Most Valuable Player
Shane Van Boening	South Dakota
Billy Thorpe	Ohio
Tyler Styer	Wisconsin
Corey Deuel	California
Johan Ruijsink	Netherlands	Non-playing Captain
Jeremy Jones	Texas	Non-playing Vice captain

== Results ==
=== Tuesday, 4 December ===
	Results
Teams; Team Europe	5–4	Teams; Team USA
Doubles; Albin Ouschan; Jayson Shaw	5–1	Doubles; Billy Thorpe; Skyler Woodward
Singles; Niels Feijen	3–5	Singles; Tyler Styer
Doubles; Eklent Kaçi; Alexander Kazakis	1–5	Doubles; Shane Van Boening; Corey Deuel
Singles; Jayson Shaw	0–5	Singles; Shane Van Boening
2	Session	3
2	Overall	3

=== Wednesday, 5 December ===
	Results
Singles; Jayson Shaw	5–2	Singles; Shane Van Boening
Doubles; Niels Feijen; Alexander Kazakis	3–5	Doubles; Skyler Woodward; Shane Van Boening
Singles; Albin Ouschan	5–3	Singles; Corey Deuel
Doubles; Eklent Kaçi; Jayson Shaw	2–5	Doubles; Billy Thorpe; Tyler Styer
Singles; Eklent Kaçi	3–5	Singles; Billy Thorpe
2	Session	3
4	Overall	6

=== Thursday, 6 December ===
	Results
Doubles; Niels Feijen; Albin Ouschan	4–5	Doubles; Skyler Woodward; Tyler Styer
Singles; Alexander Kazakis	3–5	Singles; Skyler Woodward
Doubles; Eklent Kaçi; Niels Feijen	5–4	Doubles; Tyler Styer; Corey Deuel
Singles; Jayson Shaw	4–5	Singles; Skyler Woodward
Doubles; Alexander Kazakis; Albin Ouschan	5–1	Doubles; Shane Van Boening; Billy Thorpe
2	Session	3
6	Overall	9

=== Friday, 7 December ===
	Results
Singles; Albin Ouschan	4–5	Singles; Skyler Woodward
Singles; Jayson Shaw	5–3	Singles; Tyler Styer
Singles; Niels Feijen	5–1	Singles; Corey Deuel
Singles; Eklent Kaçi	5–2	Singles; Billy Thorpe
Singles; Alexander Kazakis	3–5	Singles; Shane Van Boening
3	Session	2
9	Overall	11
