= 2019 Mosconi Cup =

Europe v USA Pool Tournament in 2019

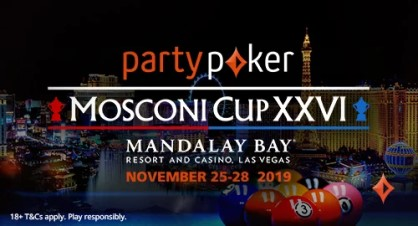
- Dates: 25–28 November 2019
- Venue: Mandalay Bay
- Location: Las Vegas, United States
- Captains: Johan Ruijsink (US); Marcus Chamat (EU)
- MVP: Skyler Woodward
- 11 – 8 USA wins the Mosconi Cup

The 2019 Mosconi Cup (also known as Mosconi Cup XXVI) was a team nine-ball tournament. The event is the 26th Mosconi Cup event, first held in 1994. The competition features matches between teams of five representing Europe and the United States. The event was held at Mandalay Bay, Las Vegas, United States from 25 to 28 November 2019. The event is based on the similar Ryder Cup series of events held in golf.

The USA team were defending champions, having won the 2018 event 11–9. Despite trailing 2–3 after the first day, the USA team took a 8–7 lead on day three, and eventually won 11–8. Skyler Woodward won the Most Valuable Player award for the second time, having also done so the year prior.

== Teams ==
Team USA
Name	State of birth	Notes
Skyler Woodward	Kentucky
Shane Van Boening	South Dakota
Billy Thorpe	Ohio
Tyler Styer	Wisconsin
Justin Bergman	Illinois
Johan Ruijsink	Netherlands	Non-playing Captain
Jeremy Jones	Texas	Non-playing Vice captain

Team Europe
Name	Nationality	Notes
Joshua Filler	Germany
Eklent Kaçi	Albania
Alexander Kazakis	Greece
Jayson Shaw	United Kingdom
Niels Feijen	Netherlands
Marcus Chamat	Sweden	Non-playing captain

== Results ==
=== Monday, 25 November ===
	Results
Teams; Team USA	5–1	Teams; Team Europe
Doubles; Shane Van Boening; Tyler Styer	5–4	Doubles; Eklent Kaçi; Niels Feijen
Singles; Billy Thorpe	0–5	Singles; Joshua Filler
Doubles; Skyler Woodward; Justin Bergman	1–5	Doubles; Alexander Kazakis; Jayson Shaw
Singles; Justin Bergman	3–5	Singles; Jayson Shaw
2	Session	3
2	Overall	3

=== Tuesday, 26 November ===
	Results
Singles; Shane Van Boening	1–5	Singles; Joshua Filler
Doubles; Shane Van Boening; Justin Bergman	5–1	Doubles; Joshua Filler; Jayson Shaw
Singles; Tyler Styer	1–5	Singles; Eklent Kaçi
Doubles; Billy Thorpe; Skyler Woodward	5–1	Doubles; Niels Feijen; Alexander Kazakis
Singles; Shane Van Boening	5–1	Singles; Alexander Kazakis
3	Session	2
5	Overall	5

=== Wednesday, 27 November ===
	Results
Doubles; Shane Van Boening; Skyler Woodward	5–1	Doubles; Joshua Filler; Eklent Kaçi
Singles; Skyler Woodward	5–3	Singles; Niels Feijen
Doubles; Skyler Woodward; Tyler Styer	5–4	Doubles; Eklent Kaçi; Alexander Kazakis
Singles; Shane Van Boening	0–5	Singles; Joshua Filler
Doubles; Justin Bergman; Billy Thorpe	4–5	Doubles; Niels Feijen; Jayson Shaw
3	Session	2
8	Overall	7

=== Thursday, 28 November ===
	Results
Singles; Billy Thorpe	5–3	Singles; Jayson Shaw
Singles; Tyler Styer	1–5	Singles; Eklent Kaçi
Singles; Shane Van Boening	5–3	Singles; Alexander Kazakis
Singles; Skyler Woodward	5–3	Singles; Joshua Filler
3	Session	1
11	Overall	8
