= 2001 Mosconi Cup =

- Dates: 20–23 December
- Venue: York Hall
- Location: Bethnal Green, London, England
- 1 – 12 United States wins the Mosconi Cup

The 2001 Daily Star Mosconi Cup, the eighth edition of the annual nine-ball pool competition between teams representing Europe and the United States, took place 20–23 December 2001 at the York Hall in Bethnal Green, London, England.

Team USA won the Mosconi Cup by defeating Team Europe 12–1.

== Teams ==
Team USA
Name	State of birth	Notes
Johnny Archer	Georgia
Nick Varner	Kentucky
Jeremy Jones	Texas
Corey Deuel	California
Earl Strickland	North Carolina
Charlie Williams	South Korea^{1}

Team Europe
Name	Nationality	Notes
Steve Knight	United Kingdom
Mika Immonen	Finland
Ralf Souquet	Germany
Niels Feijen	Netherlands
Marcus Chamat	Sweden
Steve Davis	United Kingdom

- ^{1} Born outside the United States.

== Results ==
=== Thursday, 20 December ===
==== Session 1 ====
	Results
Doubles; Niels Feijen; Mika Immonen	5–3	Doubles; Nick Varner; Johnny Archer
Doubles; Steve Knight; Marcus Chamat	1–5	Doubles; Corey Deuel; Charlie Williams
Doubles; Steve Davis; Ralf Souquet	2–5	Doubles; Earl Strickland; Jeremy Jones
1	Session	2
1	Overall	2

=== Friday, 21 December ===
==== Session 2 ====
	Results
Doubles; Steve Davis; Ralf Souquet	2–5	Doubles; Earl Strickland; Jeremy Jones
Doubles; Niels Feijen; Mika Immonen	4–5	Doubles; Nick Varner; Johnny Archer
Doubles; Steve Knight; Marcus Chamat	2–5	Doubles; Corey Deuel; Charlie Williams
0	Session	3
1	Overall	5

=== Saturday, 22 December ===
==== Session 3 ====
	Results
Singles; Mika Immonen	3–5	Singles; Johnny Archer
Singles; Ralf Souquet	1–5	Singles; Jeremy Jones
Singles; Steve Davis	1–5	Singles; Corey Deuel
0	Session	3
1	Overall	8

=== Sunday, 23 December ===
==== Session 4 ====
	Results
Singles; Marcus Chamat	2–5	Singles; Charlie Williams
Singles; Niels Feijen	2–5	Singles; Earl Strickland
Singles; Steve Knight	3–5	Singles; Nick Varner
0	Session	3
1	Overall	11

==== Session 5 ====
	Results
Doubles; Ralf Souquet; Mika Immonen	1–5	Doubles; Nick Varner; Johnny Archer
0	Session	1
1	Overall	12
