= 2007 Mosconi Cup =

- Dates: 13–16 December
- Venue: MGM Grand
- Location: Las Vegas, Nevada
- Captains: Kim Davenport (US); Johan Ruijsink (EU)
- MVP: Tony Drago (EU)
- 8 – 11; Europe wins the Mosconi Cup

The 2007 Mosconi Cup, the 14th edition of the annual nine-ball pool competition between teams representing Europe and the United States, took place 13–16 December 2007 at the MGM Grand in Las Vegas, Nevada.

Team Europe won the Cup for the first time since 2002, by defeating Team America 11–8. This was also the first time Team Europe won the title in the United States.

== The teams ==
Team USA
Name	State of birth	Notes
Earl Strickland	North Carolina
Johnny Archer	Georgia
Rodney Morris	California
Corey Deuel	California
Shane Van Boening	South Dakota
Kim Davenport	Oklahoma	Non-playing captain

Team Europe
Name	Nationality	Notes
Ralf Souquet	Germany
Niels Feijen	Netherlands
Daryl Peach	United Kingdom
Tony Drago	Malta	Most Valuable Player
Konstantin Stepanov	Russia
Johan Ruijsink	Netherlands	Non-playing captain

== Results ==
=== Thursday, 13 December ===
	Results
Teams; Team Europe	4–6	Teams; Team USA
Doubles; Niels Feijen; Ralf Souquet	6–4	Doubles; Johnny Archer; Rodney Morris
Singles; Daryl Peach	2–6	Singles; Shane Van Boening
Doubles; Tony Drago; Konstantin Stepanov	5–6	Doubles; Earl Strickland; Corey Deuel
Singles; Niels Feijen	1–6	Singles; Rodney Morris
1	Session	4
1	Overall	4

=== Friday, 14 December ===
	Results
Doubles; Daryl Peach; Ralf Souquet	6–0	Doubles; Earl Strickland; Shane Van Boening
Singles; Tony Drago	6–5	Singles; Rodney Morris
Doubles; Konstantin Stepanov; Niels Feijen	6–1	Doubles; Corey Deuel; Johnny Archer
Singles; Tony Drago	6–2	Singles; Shane Van Boening
Doubles; Daryl Peach; Ralf Souquet	5–6	Doubles; Rodney Morris; Earl Strickland
4	Session	1
5	Overall	5

=== Saturday, 15 December ===
	Results
Doubles; Konstantin Stepanov; Niels Feijen	6–2	Doubles; Corey Deuel; Johnny Archer
Singles; Tony Drago	6–4	Singles; Corey Deuel
Doubles; Konstantin Stepanov; Daryl Peach	3–6	Doubles; Johnny Archer; Shane Van Boening
Singles; Niels Feijen	6–4	Singles; Rodney Morris
Singles; Ralf Souquet	6–4	Singles; Earl Strickland
4	Session	1
9	Overall	6

=== Sunday, 16 December ===
	Results
Singles; Konstantin Stepanov	4–6	Singles; Shane Van Boening
Singles; Tony Drago	6–3	Singles; Johnny Archer
Singles; Daryl Peach	3–6	Singles; Earl Strickland
Singles; Ralf Souquet	6–4	Singles; Rodney Morris
2	Session	2
11	Overall	8
