= 2013 Mosconi Cup =

- Dates: 2–4 December
- Venue: The Mirage
- Location: Las Vegas, Nevada
- Captains: Johnny Archer (US); Johan Ruijsink (EU)
- MVP: Niels Feijen (EU)
- 2 – 11; Europe wins the Mosconi Cup

The 2013 PartyPoker.net Mosconi Cup, the 20th edition of the annual nine-ball pool competition between teams representing Europe and the United States, took place 2–4 December 2013 at the Mirage in Las Vegas, Nevada.

Team Europe won the Mosconi Cup by defeating Team USA 11–2.

== Teams ==
Team USA
| Name | State of birth | Notes |
| Shane Van Boening | South Dakota |
| Rodney Morris | California |
| Dennis Hatch | New York |
| Earl Strickland | North Carolina |
| Johnny Archer | Georgia | Captain |
| Buddy Hall | Illinois | Non-playing vice-captain |

Team Europe
| Name | Nationality | Notes |
| Ralf Souquet | Germany |
| Darren Appleton | United Kingdom |
| Niels Feijen | Netherlands | Most Valued Player |
| Karl Boyes | United Kingdom |
| Mika Immonen | Finland |
| Johan Ruijsink | Netherlands | Non-playing captain |

== Results ==
=== Monday, 2 December ===
| | Results |
|---|---|---|
| Teams; Team Europe | 6–3 | Teams; Team USA |
| Doubles; Darren Appleton; Karl Boyes | 6–3 | Doubles; Rodney Morris; Earl Strickland |
| Singles; Mika Immonen | 6–5 | Singles; Shane Van Boening |
| Doubles; Niels Feijen; Ralf Souquet | 6–2 | Doubles; Johnny Archer; Dennis Hatch |
| Singles; Darren Appleton | 6–4 | Singles; Rodney Morris |
| 5 | Session | 0 |
| 5 | Overall | 0 |

=== Tuesday, 3 December ===
| | Results |
|---|---|---|
| Doubles; Karl Boyes; Niels Feijen | 6–4 | Doubles; Johnny Archer; Rodney Morris |
| Singles; Ralf Souquet | 6–5 | Singles; Dennis Hatch |
| Doubles; Darren Appleton; Mika Immonen | 5–6 | Doubles; Earl Strickland; Shane Van Boening |
| Singles; Niels Feijen | 6–0 | Singles; Johnny Archer |
| Doubles; Mika Immonen; Karl Boyes | 5–6 | Doubles; Rodney Morris; Shane Van Boening |
| 3 | Session | 2 |
| 8 | Overall | 2 |

=== Wednesday, 4 December ===
| | Results |
|---|---|---|
| Doubles; Darren Appleton; Ralf Souquet | 6–3 | Doubles; Earl Strickland; Dennis Hatch |
| Singles; Karl Boyes | 6–4 | Singles; Earl Strickland |
| Doubles; Mika Immonen; Niels Feijen | 6–4 | Doubles; Dennis Hatch; Rodney Morris |
| 3 | Session | 0 |
| 11 | Overall | 2 |
