= Oscar Dominguez (pool player) =

Oscar Dominguez - American pool player

Personal information
- Nickname: "The Big O"
- Born: March 26, 1985 (age 41) Sylmar, California, U.S.

Pool career
- Country: United States
- Turned pro: 2003
- Pool games: Nine-ball, Ten-ball, Eight-ball

Tournament wins
- Highest rank: 31

Oscar Dominguez (born March 11, 1985) is an American professional pool player from Sylmar, California. His most significant career achievement is winning the 2009 Mosconi Cup.

== Early life ==
Dominguez was introduced to pool at age nine, learning from his father and his father's side of the family. He had begun accompanying his father to pool league matches at age seven. After his family's team relocated to Shooters Billiard Club in Burnsville, Minnesota, the nine-year-old Dominguez began playing the sport himself.

== Professional career ==
Dominguez began his professional career in the early 2000s, securing one of his first titles at the Open Straight Pool Event in California, in 2003.

He has been selected to represent Team USA at the Mosconi Cup on multiple occasions. In 2009, he was part of the victorious American team in Las Vegas. Although he lost his singles matches against Ralf Souquet (5–6) and Mika Immonen (4–6), Team USA ultimately defeated Team Europe 11–7 to claim the title.

Dominguez returned to the 2017 Mosconi Cup. During the event, he faced Ralf Souquet again in a singles match but was defeated 3–5.[3] The tournament concluded with a dominant 11–4 victory for Team Europe.

He was selected again for the 2022 Mosconi Cup. In the singles competition, he suffered a 2–5 defeat against Jayson Shaw. The event resulted in an 11–7 overall defeat for the American team.

In 2025, he won his first national championship in 2025 USA National Men's 9-Ball Pool Championship, where he defeated Sam Henderson 11–5 in the final.

Oscar Dominguez is well known in Vietnam for the final match with Duong Quoc Hoang in Scottish Open 2024. After leading 8–4, he was ultimately defeated 10–8. This match set a record for the most popular Scottish Open match on YouTube with more than 250 thousand views.

== Controversy ==
During the 2017 Mosconi Cup, Dominguez faced criticism for a comment made while wearing a microphone during the live broadcast. He was heard describing a shot as having the "touch of a rapist". Following the backlash, Dominguez issued a formal apology through Matchroom Pool, characterizing his remark as a "poor choice" of words and stating that he meant no disrespect.

== Titles and achievements ==
- 2025 USA National Men's 9-Ball Pool Championship
- 2022 Jay Swanson Memorial 2022
- 2022 Mosconi Cup
- 2017 Mosconi Cup
- 2016 Andy Mercer Mem. 2017
- 2016 2016 Mezz West State Tour Stop 1
- 2016 Jay Swanson Memorial 2016
- 2015 Chuck Markulis Mem. One Pocket Div. 2015
- 2015 2015 Mezz West State Tour Stop 6
- 2015 2015 Mezz West State Tour Stop 3
- 2015 Fight Night 16 Dominguez vs Woodward
- 2014 Mezz West State Tour Stop 5
- 2013 East Coast 9-Ball C'Ship
- 2011 TAR 23 Dominguez/Hundal
- 2009 Turning Stone XIII
- 2009 Mosconi Cup
- 2007 TAR 23 Dominguez/Hundal
- 2007 Open Straight Pool Event
