= 2011 Mosconi Cup =

- Dates: 8–11 December
- Venue: MGM Grand
- Location: Las Vegas, Nevada
- Captains: Charlie Williams (US); Johan Ruijsink (EU)
- MVP: Niels Feijen (EU)
- 7 – 11; Europe wins the Mosconi Cup

The 2011 Mosconi Cup, the 18th edition of the annual nine-ball pool competition between teams representing Europe and the United States, took place 8–11 December 2011 at the MGM Grand in Las Vegas, Nevada.

Team Europe won the Mosconi Cup by defeating Team USA 11–7.

== Teams ==
Team USA
Name	State of birth	Notes
Shane Van Boening	South Dakota
Shawn Putnam	Pennsylvania
Mike Dechaine	Maine
Johnny Archer	Georgia
Rodney Morris	California
Charlie Williams	South Korea^{1}	Non-playing captain

Team Europe
Name	Nationality	Notes
Chris Melling	United Kingdom
Darren Appleton	United Kingdom
Ralf Souquet	Germany
Nick van den Berg	Netherlands
Niels Feijen	Netherlands	Most Valued Player
Johan Ruijsink	Netherlands	Non-playing captain

- ^{1} Born outside the United States.

== Results ==
=== Thursday, 8 December ===
	Results
Teams; Team Europe	6–3	Teams; Team USA
Doubles; Chris Melling; Nick van den Berg	3–6	Doubles; Johnny Archer; Shawn Putnam
Singles; Niels Feijen	6–0	Singles; Rodney Morris
Doubles; Darren Appleton; Ralf Souquet	6–4	Doubles; Shane Van Boening; Mike Dechaine
Singles; Chris Melling	6–5	Singles; Shane Van Boening
4	Session	1
4	Overall	1

=== Friday, 9 December ===
	Results
Doubles; Nick van den Berg; Niels Feijen	5–6	Doubles; Shane Van Boening; Johnny Archer
Singles; Ralf Souquet	1–6	Singles; Mike Dechaine
Doubles; Darren Appleton; Chris Melling	5–6	Doubles; Shawn Putnam; Rodney Morris
Singles; Nick van den Berg	6–1	Singles; Johnny Archer
Doubles; Ralf Souquet; Chris Melling	6–2	Doubles; Shane Van Boening; Rodney Morris
2	Session	3
6	Overall	4

=== Saturday, 10 December ===
	Results
Doubles; Darren Appleton; Niels Feijen	6–3	Doubles; Shawn Putnam; Mike Dechaine
Singles; Darren Appleton	6–2	Singles; Shawn Putnam
Doubles; Ralf Souquet; Niels Feijen	6–2	Doubles; Johnny Archer; Rodney Morris
Singles; Nick van den Berg	5–6	Singles; Shane Van Boening
Singles; Chris Melling	6–2	Singles; Mike Dechaine
4	Session	1
10	Overall	5

=== Sunday, 11 December ===
	Results
Singles; Nick van den Berg	2–6	Singles; Shane Van Boening
Singles; Darren Appleton	3–6	Singles; Johnny Archer
Singles; Niels Feijen	6–4	Singles; Rodney Morris
1	Session	2
11	Overall	7
