= 2003 Mosconi Cup =

- Dates: 18–21 December
- Venue: MGM Grand
- Location: Las Vegas, Nevada
- Captains: Nick Varner (US); Oliver Ortmann (EU)
- MVP: Mika Immonen (EU)
- 11 – 9 United States wins the Mosconi Cup

The 2003 Mosconi Cup, the tenth edition of the annual nine-ball pool competition between teams representing Europe and the United States, took place 18–21 December 2003 at the MGM Grand in Las Vegas, Nevada. This was the first time that the competition was held outside England and that there were non-playing captains.

Team USA won the Mosconi Cup by defeating Team Europe 11–9.

Team Europe's Mika Immonen (Finland) was declared the most valued player.

== Teams ==
Team USA
Name	State of birth	Notes
Johnny Archer	Georgia
Jeremy Jones	Texas
Rodney Morris	California
Earl Strickland	North Carolina
Charlie Williams	South Korea^{1}
Tony Robles	New York
Nick Varner	Kentucky	Non-playing captain

Team Europe
Name	Nationality	Notes
Mika Immonen	Finland	Most Valued Player
Ralf Souquet	Germany
Nick van den Berg	Netherlands
Marcus Chamat	Sweden
Steve Davis	United Kingdom
Thorsten Hohmann	Germany
Oliver Ortmann	Germany	Non-playing captain

- ^{1} Born outside the United States.

== Results ==
=== Thursday, 18 December ===
	Results
Singles; Thorsten Hohmann	4–5	Singles; Johnny Archer
Doubles; Mika Immonen; Marcus Chamat	5–1	Doubles; Charlie Williams; Tony Robles
Singles; Ralf Souquet	3–5	Singles; Rodney Morris
Doubles; Steve Davis; Nick van den Berg	4–5	Doubles; Earl Strickland; Jeremy Jones
Singles; Mika Immonen	5–3	Singles; Johnny Archer
2	Session	3
2	Overall	3

=== Friday, 19 December ===
	Results
Singles; Marcus Chamat	3–5	Singles; Jeremy Jones
Doubles; Steve Davis; Nick van den Berg	3–5	Doubles; Tony Robles; Earl Strickland
Singles; Mika Immonen	5–4	Singles; Charlie Williams
Doubles; Ralf Souquet; Thorsten Hohmann	1–5	Doubles; Johnny Archer; Rodney Morris
1	Session	3
3	Overall	6

=== Saturday, 20 December ===
	Results
Singles; Nick van den Berg	5–3	Singles; Tony Robles
Doubles; Thorsten Hohmann; Ralf Souquet	5–4	Doubles; Johnny Archer; Rodney Morris
Singles; Steve Davis	5–0	Singles; Earl Strickland
Doubles; Mika Immonen; Marcus Chamat	5–2	Doubles; Charlie Williams; Jeremy Jones
Singles; Ralf Souquet	5–3	Singles; Jeremy Jones
5	Session	0
8	Overall	6

=== Sunday, 21 December ===
	Results
Singles; Thorsten Hohmann	3–5	Singles; Rodney Morris
Singles; Steve Davis	2–5	Singles; Johnny Archer
Singles; Nick van den Berg	4–5	Singles; Earl Strickland
Singles; Mika Immonen	2–5	Singles; Tony Robles
Singles; Ralf Souquet	5–3	Singles; Charlie Williams
Singles; Marcus Chamat	2–5	Singles; Jeremy Jones
1	Session	5
9	Overall	11
