= 2020 Mosconi Cup =

Europe v USA Pool Tournament in 2020

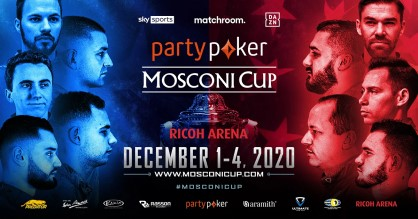
- Dates: 1–4 December 2020
- Venue: Ricoh Arena
- Location: Coventry, England
- Captains: Alex Lely (EU); Jeremy Jones (US)
- MVP: Jayson Shaw
- 11 – 3 Europe wins the Mosconi Cup

The 2020 Mosconi Cup was a team nine-ball tournament, between teams representing Europe and the United States. It was the 27th edition of the competition and took place between 1–4 December 2020. The event was originally scheduled to be held at the Alexandra Palace in London, however it was moved to the Ricoh Arena in Coventry with the whole event behind closed doors in a COVID-19 secure bubble. The coronavirus pandemic also affected the team selection, with Corey Deuel replacing Justin Bergman for Team USA after Bergman tested positive for COVID-19. Team USA were defending champions, having won the two previous tournaments. After a close first day, Team Europe were 3–2 ahead but only lost one further match, winning the cup 11–3. Jayson Shaw won the Most Valuable Player award for the first time after winning all his singles and doubles matches.

== Teams ==
Team Europe
Name	Nationality	Notes
Fedor Gorst	Russia
Joshua Filler	Germany
Jayson Shaw	Scotland	Most Valuable Player
Albin Ouschan	Austria
Eklent Kaçi	Albania
Alex Lely	Netherlands	Non-Playing Captain
Karl Boyes	England	Non-Playing Vice captain

Team USA
Name	State of birth	Notes
Skyler Woodward	Kentucky
Shane Van Boening	South Dakota
Billy Thorpe	Ohio
Chris Reinhold	California
Corey Deuel	California
Jeremy Jones	Texas	Non-Playing Captain
Joey Gray	Oklahoma	Non-Playing Vice Captain

== Results ==
=== Tuesday, 1 December ===
	Results
Teams; Team Europe	3–5	Teams; Team USA
Doubles; Joshua Filler; Fedor Gorst	5–2	Doubles; Shane Van Boening; Corey Deuel
Singles; Eklent Kaçi	5–4	Singles; Chris Robinson
Doubles; Jayson Shaw; Albin Ouschan	5–2	Doubles; Skyler Woodward; Billy Thorpe
Singles; Albin Ouschan	4–5	Singles; Shane Van Boening
3	Session	2
3	Overall	2

=== Wednesday, 2 December ===
	Results
Singles; Jayson Shaw	5–4	Singles; Shane Van Boening
Doubles; Jayson Shaw; Joshua Filler	5–4	Doubles; Skyler Woodward; Chris Robinson
Singles; Fedor Gorst	5–2	Singles; Corey Deuel
Doubles; Eklent Kaçi; Albin Ouschan	5–4	Doubles; Shane Van Boening; Billy Thorpe
Singles; Jayson Shaw	5–3	Singles; Billy Thorpe
5	Session	0
8	Overall	2

=== Thursday, 3 December ===
	Results
Doubles; Albin Ouschan; Joshua Filler	5–2	Doubles; Shane Van Boening; Skyler Woodward
Singles; Joshua Filler	5–0	Singles; Skyler Woodward
Doubles; Albin Ouschan; Fedor Gorst	3–5	Doubles; Billy Thorpe; Chris Robinson
Singles; Jayson Shaw	5–3	Singles; Shane Van Boening
3	Session	1
11	Overall	3
