= 2009 Mosconi Cup =

- Dates: 10–13 December
- Venue: MGM Grand
- Location: Las Vegas, Nevada
- Captains: Nick Varner (US); Alex Lely (EU)
- MVP: Dennis Hatch (US)
- 11 – 7 United States wins the Mosconi Cup

The 2009 Mosconi Cup, the 16th edition of the annual nine-ball pool competition between teams representing Europe and the United States, took place 10–13 December 2009 at the MGM Grand in Las Vegas, Nevada.

Team USA won the Mosconi Cup by defeating Team Europe 11–7.

== Format ==
The format was broadly similar to that used in past years. All matches were a race to 6 with alternate break, with the winner earning 1 point; the first team to 11 points wins the cup. However, several changes were made for this season:

- No pairing in the doubles matches can be repeated.
- Several match groupings were arranged so that every player is required to play in one and only one of the group.
- In two singles matches – the last match on Thursday, and the first on Friday – each player was selected by the opposing team captain.

== Teams ==
Team USA
Name	State of birth	Notes
Johnny Archer	Georgia
Corey Deuel	California
Oscar Dominguez	California
Shane Van Boening	South Dakota
Dennis Hatch	Michigan	Most Valuable Player
Nick Varner	Kentucky	Non-playing captain

Team Europe
Name	Nationality	Notes
Ralf Souquet	Germany
Niels Feijen	Netherlands
Darren Appleton	United Kingdom
Mika Immonen	Finland
Thorsten Hohmann	Germany
Alex Lely	Netherlands	Non-playing captain

== Results ==
=== Thursday, 10 December ===
	Results
Teams; Team Europe	4–6	Teams; Team USA
Doubles; Niels Feijen; Darren Appleton	5–6	Doubles; Johnny Archer; Dennis Hatch
Singles; Mika Immonen	3–6	Singles; Shane Van Boening
Doubles; Ralf Souquet; Thorsten Hohmann	2–6	Doubles; Corey Deuel; Óscar Domínguez
Singles; Ralf Souquet	6–5	Singles; Óscar Domínguez
1	Session	4
1	Overall	4

=== Friday, 11 December ===
	Results
Doubles; Ralf Souquet; Niels Feijen	2–6	Doubles; Shane Van Boening; Johnny Archer
Singles; Thorsten Hohmann	6–4	Singles; Corey Deuel
Doubles; Mika Immonen; Darren Appleton	4–6	Doubles; Dennis Hatch; Óscar Domínguez
Singles; Darren Appleton	5–6	Singles; Johnny Archer
1	Session	3
2	Overall	7

=== Saturday, 12 December ===
	Results
Doubles; Niels Feijen; Thorsten Hohmann	6–1	Doubles; Dennis Hatch; Corey Deuel
Doubles; Ralf Souquet; Mika Immonen	6–4	Doubles; Shane Van Boening; Óscar Domínguez
Singles; Niels Feijen	4–6	Singles; Dennis Hatch
Doubles; Thorsten Hohmann; Darren Appleton	5–6	Doubles; Johnny Archer; Corey Deuel
Singles; Mika Immonen	6–4	Singles; Óscar Domínguez
3	Session	2
5	Overall	9

=== Sunday, 13 December ===
	Results
Singles; Ralf Souquet	6–3	Singles; Shane Van Boening
Singles; Niels Feijen	0–6	Singles; Dennis Hatch
Singles; Thorsten Hohmann	6–1	Singles; Johnny Archer
Singles; Ralf Souquet	2–6	Singles; Shane Van Boening
2	Session	2
7	Overall	11
