= Mosconi Cup =

Annual nine-ball pool tournament

2025 Mosconi Cup
- Dates: 3rd December 2025 - 6th December 2025
- Venue: Alexandra Palace
- Location: London, United Kingdom
- Captains: Skyler Woodward (United States); Jayson Shaw (Europe)
- MVP: Moritz Neuhausen
- 11 – 3 Europe retains the Mosconi Cup

The Mosconi Cup is an annual nine-ball pool tournament contested since 1994 between teams representing Europe and the United States. Named after American pool player Willie Mosconi, the event is comparable to the Ryder Cup in golf, the Weber Cup in bowling and the Laver Cup in tennis.

Team composition and formats have varied over the years. As of 2025, each team has five playing members. Each team also has a captain and vice captain, who may be among the players, or may be non-playing additional members of the team. The teams compete over one team match, several doubles matches and singles matches, with the first team to win 11 matches claiming victory.

On 6 December 2025, Team Europe beat Team USA 11–3, kept the title and took an overall series lead of 18–13, with one tie.

== History and player selection ==
First staged in 1994 by Sky Sports and Matchroom Sport as an exhibition event to increase public awareness of pool in the United Kingdom, the Mosconi Cup was named to commemorate the legacy of American pool player Willie Mosconi, who died in 1993.

In the first year of competition, each team featured six men and two women, with Germany's Franziska Stark and England's Allison Fisher on Team Europe, and Jeanette Lee and Vivian Villarreal on Team USA. No women appeared after the initial event, although Kelly Fisher in 2021 called on organizers to reinstate female players. In the event's early years, professional snooker players Ronnie O'Sullivan, Jimmy White, Alex Higgins, and Steve Davis all competed on Team Europe.

Staged in England for its first nine years, the Mosconi Cup from 2003 to 2024 alternated annually between the US and Europe. Most U.S. tournaments taking place in Las Vegas, Nevada other than in 2024 event being held in Orlando, Florida. Most of the European tournaments taking place in England other than 2004 and 2006 which were held in the Netherlands and the 2008 event being held in Malta.

As time progressed, the event evolved from its exhibition nature into a much more serious and professional tournament. Among the snooker players, only Davis continued into the event's more serious era, competing in the first eleven Mosconi Cups and bowing out only when the event began to clash with snooker's UK Championship, at which he appeared as both a player and a BBC commentator. After Davis's withdrawal, all players had to earn an invitation through their performances at other pool events, meaning that no more snooker players appeared until 2007 when Tony Drago earned a place by virtue of his performance on the European Pool Tour.

Team USA initially dominated the tournament, winning 10 of the first 12 tournaments between 1994 and 2005, including 6 consecutive victories from 1996 to 2001. The 2006 tournament was a tie. Since then, Team Europe has dominated the tournament, winning 15 of the 18 events staged between 2007 and 2024, including 8 consecutive victories from 2010 to 2017. The overall series record now stands at 18–13 to Team Europe.

Joshua Filler of Germany became the youngest player to participate in the Mosconi Cup at 20 years old, in 2017. Earl Strickland of the United States became the oldest player to participate in the Mosconi Cup at 61 years old, in 2022.

The record for the most Mosconi Cup appearances is 18, held by USA's Shane Van Boening. The record for the most Mosconi Cup wins is 9, held jointly by both USA's Earl Strickland and Johnny Archer.

== Player appearances ==
The players to have appeared in the Mosconi Cup:

Legend	P = playing team member	NP = non-playing member

=== European players ===
Appearance		Name	Country
P	NP	Name	Country
17	0	Ralf Souquet	Germany
15	0	Mika Immonen	Finland
14	0	Niels Feijen	Netherlands
11	0	Steve Davis	England
10	0	Jayson Shaw	Scotland
8	1	Oliver Ortmann	Germany
8	0	Darren Appleton	England
8	0	Nick van den Berg	Netherlands
7	0	Albin Ouschan	Austria
7	0	David Alcaide	Spain
7	0	Joshua Filler	Germany
6	5	Marcus Chamat	Sweden
5	0	Eklent Kaçi	Albania
4	2	Karl Boyes	England
4	0	Steve Knight	England
3	1	Thomas Engert	Germany
3	0	Francisco Sánchez Ruiz	Spain
3	0	Mark Gray	England
3	0	Thorsten Hohmann	Germany
2	3	Alex Lely	Netherlands
2	0	Tony Drago	Malta
2	0	Nikos Ekonomopoulos	Greece
2	0	Chris Melling	England
2	0	Ronnie O'Sullivan	England
2	0	Daryl Peach	England
2	0	Tom Storm	Sweden
2	0	Jimmy White	England
2	0	Alexander Kazakis	Greece
1	0	Pijus Labutis	Lithuania
1	0	Moritz Neuhausen	Germany
1	0	Mickey Krause	Denmark
1	0	Fedor Gorst	Russia
1	0	Tommy Donlon	Ireland
1	0	Vincent Facquet	France
1	0	Allison Fisher	England
1	0	Alex Higgins	Northern Ireland
1	0	Raj Hundal	England
1	0	Lee Kendall	England
1	0	Imran Majid	England
1	0	Fabio Petroni	Italy
1	0	Andy Richardson	England
1	0	Franziska Stark	Germany
1	0	Konstantin Stepanov	Russia
1	0	Lee Tucker	England
0	7	Johan Ruysink	Netherlands
0	1	Ralph Eckert	Germany

=== American players ===
Appearance		Name	State
P	NP	Name	State
19	0	Shane Van Boening	South Dakota
17	0	Johnny Archer	Georgia
15	0	Earl Strickland	North Carolina
11	0	Skyler Woodward	Kentucky
11	0	Corey Deuel	California
10	0	Rodney Morris	California
8	4	Jeremy Jones	Texas
7	0	Tyler Styer	Wisconsin
6	0	Billy Thorpe	Ohio
5	1	Charlie Williams	South Korea^{1}
5	0	Dennis Hatch	New York
4	4	Nick Varner	Kentucky
4	0	Justin Bergman	Illinois
4	0	Mike Dechaine	Maine
3	1	Kim Davenport	Oklahoma
3	0	Oscar Dominguez	California
3	0	Jim Rempe	Pennsylvania
2	3	Mark Wilson	Missouri
3	0	Fedor Gorst	Russia ^{1}
2	0	Chris Reinhold	California
2	0	Lou Butera	Pennsylvania
2	0	Michael Coltrain	North Carolina
2	0	Shannon Daulton	Kentucky
2	0	Mike Gulyassy	Ohio
2	0	Bobby Hunter	Michigan
2	0	Mike Massey	Tennessee
2	0	Reed Pierce	Mississippi
2	0	Shawn Putnam	Pennsylvania
2	0	Tony Robles	New York
2	0	John Schmidt	California
2	0	Dallas West	Illinois
1	1	C.J. Wiley	Texas
1	0	Shane Wolford	Virginia
1	0	Mike Davis	North Carolina
1	0	John DiToro	Florida
1	0	Paul Gerni	New Jersey
1	0	Roger Griffis	Texas
1	0	Justin Hall	Illinois
1	0	Danny Harriman	Maryland
1	0	Allen Hopkins	New Jersey
1	0	Jeanette Lee	New York
1	0	Gabe Owen	Kansas
1	0	Brandon Shuff	Virginia
1	0	Vivian Villarreal	Texas
0	3	Johan Ruysink	Netherlands^{1}
0	1	Buddy Hall	Illinois
0	1	Joey Gray	Oklahoma

- ^{1} Born outside the United States

As of 2025, Fedor Gorst and Johan Ruysink are the only people to take part in both teams, with Gorst being the only playing member and Ruysink the non-playing participant.

== Player wins ==
The players to have been on a winning team in the Mosconi Cup:

Legend	WP = winning playing team member	WNP = winning non-playing member

=== European players ===
Winner		Name	Country
WP	WNP	Name	Country
8	0	Jayson Shaw	Scotland
8	0	Niels Feijen	Netherlands
7	0	Albin Ouschan	Austria
7	0	Darren Appleton	England
7	0	Ralf Souquet	Germany
6	0	Nick van den Berg	Netherlands
6	0	Joshua Filler	Germany
6	0	David Alcaide	Spain
4	0	Mika Immonen	Finland
4	2	Karl Boyes	England
3	0	Eklent Kaçi	Albania
3	0	Francisco Sánchez Ruiz	Spain
3	0	Mark Gray	England
2	0	Oliver Ortmann	Germany
2	0	Steve Davis	England
2	0	Tony Drago	Malta
2	0	Nikos Ekonomopoulos	Greece
2	0	Chris Melling	England
2	0	Daryl Peach	England
1	3	Marcus Chamat	Sweden
1	0	Pijus Labutis	Lithuania
1	0	Moritz Neuhausen	Germany
1	0	Mickey Krause	Denmark
1	0	Tom Storm	Sweden
1	0	Jimmy White	England
1	0	Fedor Gorst	Russia
1	0	Alex Higgins	Northern Ireland
1	0	Lee Kendall	England
1	0	Konstantin Stepanov	Russia
0	3	Alex Lely	Netherlands
0	6	Johan Ruysink	Netherlands
0	1	Ralph Eckert	Germany

=== American players ===
Winner		Name	State
WP	WNP	Name	State
9	0	Earl Strickland	North Carolina
9	0	Johnny Archer	Georgia
5	2	Jeremy Jones	Texas
4	0	Corey Deuel	California
4	0	Charlie Williams	South Korea^{1}
3	2	Nick Varner	Kentucky
3	0	Shane Van Boening	South Dakota
3	0	Rodney Morris	California
3	0	Kim Davenport	Oklahoma
3	0	Jim Rempe	Pennsylvania
2	0	Skyler Woodward	Kentucky
2	0	Billy Thorpe	Ohio
2	0	Tyler Styer	Wisconsin
2	0	Shannon Daulton	Kentucky
2	0	Tony Robles	New York
2	0	Reed Pierce	Mississippi
2	0	Michael Coltrain	North Carolina
1	0	Dennis Hatch	New York
1	0	Justin Bergman	Illinois
1	0	Mark Wilson	Missouri
1	0	Lou Butera	Pennsylvania
1	0	Mike Gulyassy	Ohio
1	0	Bobby Hunter	Michigan
1	0	Mike Massey	Tennessee
1	0	Shawn Putnam	Pennsylvania
1	0	Dallas West	Illinois
1	0	Oscar Dominguez	California
1	0	C.J. Wiley	Texas
1	0	Paul Gerni	New Jersey
1	0	Roger Griffis	Texas
1	0	Danny Harriman	Maryland
1	0	Allen Hopkins	New Jersey
1	0	Jeanette Lee	New York
1	0	Gabe Owen	Kansas
1	0	Vivian Villarreal	Texas
0	2	Johan Ruysink	Netherlands^{1}

- ^{1} Born outside the United States

== Player representation ==
=== European nations ===
Players from sixteen nations have represented Europe. Sorted by number of different people, (number of appearances), and alphabetically, these are:

Number of players by country
15 (43) England	6 (41) Germany	4 (23) Netherlands	2 (12) Sweden
2 (10) Spain	2 (4) Greece	1 (15) Finland	1 (10) Scotland
1 (7) Austria	1 (5) Albania	1 (2) Malta	1 (1) France
1 (1) Ireland	1 (1) Italy	1 (1) Northern Ireland	2 (2) Russia
1 (1) Denmark	1 (1) Lithuania		

=== American states ===
Players from twenty-three states have represented the United States (Fedor Gorst, Charlie Williams and Johan Ruijsink were all born outside of the US). Ordered as above, these are:

Number of players by state
4 (28) California	4 (19) Texas	4 (8) Illinois	3 (18) North Carolina
3 (15) Kentucky	3 (8) New York	3 (7) Pennsylvania	2 (8) Ohio
2 (2) New Jersey	1 (17) Georgia	1 (19) South Dakota	1 (5) Missouri
2 (5) Oklahoma	1 (6) Wisconsin	1 (4) Maine	1 (3) Michigan
1 (2) Mississippi	2 (2) Virginia	1 (2) Tennessee	1 (2) Indiana
1 (1) Florida	1 (1) Kansas	1 (1) Maryland	

== Tournament modifications ==
There have been rule changes and format changes throughout the tournament's history. These include, but are not limited to: "Non-playing captain" roles were introduced in the 2003 event; however these were removed in the 2004 tournament. In 2004 the doubles matches were re-formatted to be scotch doubles. In 2005, a 30-second shot clock was introduced, and caused controversy due to timing malfunctions. The 2006 tournament started with a team-versus-team match followed by two trebles matches. That year also saw the reintroduction of the non-playing captain role.

The 2009 tournament included several new features:

- No pairing in the doubles matches could be repeated.
- The event included four blocks of consecutive matches, organized so that five slots were available for each side, in which every player was required to play exactly once.
- In two singles matches, each player was selected by the opposing team captain.

== Results by year ==
=== Summary ===
Team	From	To	Matches	Wins	Losses	Ties	Win %
Europe	1994	2025	31	18	13	1	54.84%
USA	1994	2025	31	13	18	1	41.94%

Up to date as of 2024 Mosconi Cup

=== Editions ===
#	Year	Venue	Winners	Score	Losers	MVP	Ref
1st	1994	Romford, London, England	United States	16–12	Europe	–	
2nd	1995	Basildon, Essex, England	Europe	16–15	USA	–	
3rd	1996	Dagenham, London, England	United States	15–13	Europe	–	
4th	1997	Bethnal Green, London, England	United States	13–8	Europe	–	
5th	1998	Bethnal Green, London, England	United States	13–9	Europe	–	
6th	1999	Bethnal Green, London, England	United States	12–7	Europe	–	
7th	2000	Bethnal Green, London, England	United States	12–9	Europe	–	
8th	2001	Bethnal Green, London, England	United States	12–1	Europe	–	
9th	2002	Bethnal Green, London, England	Europe	12–9	USA	–	
10th	2003	Las Vegas, Nevada, United States	United States	11–9	Europe	(Finland) Mika Immonen	
11th	2004	Egmond aan Zee, Netherlands	United States	12–9	Europe	(United States) Rodney Morris	
12th	2005	Las Vegas, Nevada, United States	United States	11–6	Europe	(United States) Earl Strickland	
13th	2006	Rotterdam, Netherlands	Tied	12–12	Tied	(United States) Corey Deuel	
14th	2007	Las Vegas, Nevada, United States	Europe	11–8	USA	(Malta) Tony Drago	
15th	2008	St. Julian's, Malta	Europe	11–5	USA	(Finland) Mika Immonen	
16th	2009	Las Vegas, Nevada, United States	United States	11–7	Europe	(United States) Dennis Hatch	
17th	2010	Bethnal Green, London, England	Europe	11–8	USA	(England) Darren Appleton	
18th	2011	Las Vegas, Nevada, United States	Europe	11–7	USA	(Netherlands) Niels Feijen	
19th	2012	Bethnal Green, London, England	Europe	11–9	USA	(England) Chris Melling	
20th	2013	Las Vegas, Nevada, United States	Europe	11–2	USA	(Netherlands) Niels Feijen	
21st	2014	Tower Circus, Blackpool, England	Europe	11–5	USA	(Netherlands) Niels Feijen	
22nd	2015	Las Vegas, Nevada, United States	Europe	11–7	USA	(Netherlands) Niels Feijen	
23rd	2016	Alexandra Palace, London, England	Europe	11–3	USA	(Austria) Albin Ouschan	
24th	2017	Las Vegas, Nevada, United States	Europe	11–4	USA	(Germany) Joshua Filler	
25th	2018	Alexandra Palace, London, England	United States	11–9	Europe	(United States) Skyler Woodward	
26th	2019	Las Vegas, Nevada, United States	United States	11–8	Europe	(United States) Skyler Woodward	
27th	2020	Ricoh Arena, Coventry, England	Europe	11–3	USA	(Scotland) Jayson Shaw	
28th	2021	Alexandra Palace, London, England	Europe	11–6	USA	(Scotland) Jayson Shaw	
29th	2022	Las Vegas, Nevada, United States	Europe	11–7	USA	(Germany) Joshua Filler	
30th	2023	Alexandra Palace, London, England	Europe	11–3	USA	(Germany) Joshua Filler	
31st	2024	Caribe Royale, Orlando, Florida, United States	Europe	11–6	USA	(Scotland) Jayson Shaw	
32nd	2025	Alexandra Palace, London, England	Europe	11-3	USA	(Germany) Moritz Neuhausen	
33rd	2026	Caribe Royale, Orlando, Florida, United States					
