= 2019 Kremlin Cup (pool) =

Tournament information
- Dates: 17–21 September 2019
- City: Moscow
- Country: Russia
- Format: Ten-ball
- Defending champion: Niels Feijen

Final
- Champion: Tyler Styer
- Runner-up: David Alcaide
- Score: 8–7

The 2019 Kremlin Cup was an international professional ten-ball pool tournament held between 17–21 September in Moscow, Russia.

Tyler Styer won the event, defeating David Alcaide in the final 8 racks to 7.
