= 2017 Mosconi Cup =

Nine-ball pool competition

- Dates: 4–7 December
- Venue: Mandalay Bay
- Location: Las Vegas, Nevada
- Captains: Johan Ruijsink (US); Marcus Chamat (EU)
- MVP: Joshua Filler
- 4 – 11; Europe wins the Mosconi Cup

The 2017 partypoker Mosconi Cup, the 24th edition of the annual nine-ball pool competition between teams representing Europe and the United States, took place 4–7 December 2017 at the Mandalay Bay in Las Vegas, Nevada.

== Teams ==
Team USA
Name	State of birth	Notes
Shane Van Boening	South Dakota
Skyler Woodward	Kentucky
Dennis Hatch	New York
Oscar Dominguez	California
Billy Thorpe	Ohio
Johan Ruijsink	Netherlands	Non-playing captain

Team Europe
Name	Nationality	Notes
Ralf Souquet	Germany
Nick van den Berg	Netherlands
Joshua Filler	Germany	Most Valuable Player
Jayson Shaw	United Kingdom
David Alcaide	Spain
Marcus Chamat	Sweden	Non-playing captain

== Results ==
=== Monday, 4 December ===
Day review:

	Results
Teams; Team USA	3–5	Teams; Team Europe
Doubles; Billy Thorpe; Skyler Woodward	3–5	Doubles; David Alcaide; Jayson Shaw
Singles; Dennis Hatch	4–5	Singles; Joshua Filler
Doubles; Shane Van Boening; Oscar Dominguez	3–5	Doubles; Ralf Souquet; Nick van den Berg
Singles; Shane Van Boening	5–1	Singles; Jayson Shaw
1	Session	4
1	Overall	4

=== Tuesday, 5 December ===
Day review:

	Results
Doubles; Dennis Hatch; Billy Thorpe	5–4	Doubles; David Alcaide; Nick van den Berg
Singles; Oscar Dominguez	3–5	Singles; Ralf Souquet
Doubles; Shane Van Boening; Skyler Woodward	1–5	Doubles; Joshua Filler; Jayson Shaw
Singles; Skyler Woodward	1–5	Singles; David Alcaide
Doubles; Shane Van Boening; Billy Thorpe	0–5	Doubles; Joshua Filler; Nick van den Berg
1	Session	4
2	Overall	8

=== Wednesday, 6 December ===
Day review:

	Results
Doubles; Oscar Dominguez; Dennis Hatch	5–4	Doubles; Jayson Shaw; Ralf Souquet
Singles; Billy Thorpe	5–4	Singles; Nick van den Berg
Doubles; Skyler Woodward; Oscar Dominguez	2–5	Doubles; David Alcaide; Ralf Souquet
Singles; Shane Van Boening	4–5	Singles; Jayson Shaw
2	Session	2
4	Overall	10

=== Thursday, 7 December ===
Day review:

	Results
Singles; Dennis Hatch	3–5	Singles; Joshua Filler
0	Session	1
4	Overall	11
