= 2010 Mosconi Cup =

- Dates: 9–12 December
- Venue: York Hall
- Location: Bethnal Green, London, England
- Captains: Johan Ruijsink (EU); Nick Varner (US)
- MVP: Darren Appleton (EU)
- 11 – 8 Europe wins the Mosconi Cup

The 2010 Mosconi Cup, the 17th edition of the annual nine-ball pool competition between teams representing Europe and the United States, took place 9–12 December 2010 at the York Hall in Bethnal Green, London, England.

Team Europe won the Mosconi Cup by defeating Team USA 11–8.

== Teams ==
Team USA
Name	State of birth	Notes
Johnny Archer	Georgia
Dennis Hatch	Michigan
Rodney Morris	California
Shane Van Boening	South Dakota
Corey Deuel	California
Nick Varner	Kentucky	Non-playing captain

Team Europe
Name	Nationality	Notes
Ralf Souquet	Germany
Mika Immonen	Finland
Nick van den Berg	Netherlands
Darren Appleton	United Kingdom	Most Valuable Player
Karl Boyes	United Kingdom
Johan Ruijsink	Netherlands	Non-playing captain

== Results ==
=== Thursday, 9 December ===
==== Session 1 ====
	Results
Teams; Team Europe	6–5	Teams; Team USA
Doubles; Nick van den Berg; Ralf Souquet	4–6	Doubles; Dennis Hatch; Rodney Morris
Singles; Mika Immonen	4–6	Singles; Corey Deuel
1	Session	2
1	Overall	2

=== Friday, 10 December ===
==== Session 2 ====
	Results
Doubles; Darren Appleton; Karl Boyes	6–3	Doubles; Johnny Archer; Shane Van Boening
Singles; Ralf Souquet	5–6	Singles; Johnny Archer
Doubles; Darren Appleton; Ralf Souquet	6–5	Doubles; Corey Deuel; Rodney Morris
Singles; Nick van den Berg	5–6	Singles; Shane Van Boening
2	Session	2
3	Overall	4

=== Saturday, 11 December ===
==== Session 3 ====
	Results
Doubles; Mika Immonen; Karl Boyes	5–1	Doubles; Dennis Hatch; Johnny Archer
Doubles; Mika Immonen; Ralf Souquet	2–5	Doubles; Johnny Archer; Corey Deuel
Singles; Karl Boyes	5–2	Singles; Rodney Morris
2	Session	1
5	Overall	5

==== Session 4 ====
	Results
Doubles; Darren Appleton; Nick van den Berg	4–5	Doubles; Shane Van Boening; Dennis Hatch
Doubles; Karl Boyes; Ralf Souquet	5–4	Doubles; Johnny Archer; Rodney Morris
Singles; Darren Appleton	5–4	Singles; Dennis Hatch
Doubles; Mika Immonen; Nick van den Berg	5–1	Doubles; Shane Van Boening; Corey Deuel
3	Session	1
8	Overall	6

=== Sunday, 12 December ===
==== Session 5 ====
	Results
Singles; Mika Immonen	6–1	Singles; Rodney Morris
Singles; Karl Boyes	5–6	Singles; Johnny Archer
Singles; Nick van den Berg	5–6	Singles; Dennis Hatch
1	Session	2
9	Overall	8

==== Session 6 ====
	Results
Singles; Darren Appleton	6–2	Singles; Shane Van Boening
Singles; Ralf Souquet	6–4	Singles; Corey Deuel
2	Session	0
11	Overall	8
