= American 14.1 Straight Pool Championship =

The International Straight Pool Open, formerly known as the American 14.1 Straight Pool Championship, is a professional tournament for straight pool (also known as continuous 14.1 pool) held in the United States since 2014. It was originally organized by promoter Peter Burrows and was played in Virginia. Beginning with the 2024 edition, organization of the tournament has been assumed by Pat Flemming, promoter of the International Open nine-ball tournament in Florida, and has played back-to-back in the same venue.

== Format ==
The tournament has been held in the fall over a 4 or 5 day period.

42 or 48 players are subjectively ranked by skill level and evenly distributed into groups of 6 or 7 players for the initial round-robin phase. After, the players with the best records from each group move on to a 24 players single-elimination tournament. The 8 players with the best records get a bye. Matches are races to 125 during the round-robin phase and to 150 during the single-elimination tournament except for the final which is a race to 175 or 200.

In 2021, a women's division was added to the format. Fifteen women competed in 3 groups during the round-robin and eight of them move to a single elimination tournament. Kelly Fisher defeated Pia Filler in the finals with a score of 100-46.

== Events ==
Men

Year	Date	Venue	Location	Winner	Runner-up	Score
2014	September 12-14	Diamond Billiards	Midlothian, VA, USA	(England) Darren Appleton	(Northern Ireland) Karen Corr	150-28
2015	October 22-25	Diamond Billiards	Midlothian, VA, USA	(England) Darren Appleton (2)	(Germany) Thorsten Hohmann	150-94
2016	October 12-16	Diamond Billiards	Midlothian, VA, USA	(Netherlands) Niels Feijen	(Finland) Mika Immonen	150-114
2017	October 17-21	Diamond Billiards	Midlothian, VA, USA	(Poland) Konrad Juszczyszyn	(Philippines) Dennis Orcollo	150-87
2018	October 16-19	Carom Cafe Billiards	New York City, NY, USA	(Albania) Eklent Kaçi	(Germany) Thorsten Hohmann	200-168
2019	October 22-26	Q-Master Billiards	Virginia Beach, VA, USA	(Russia) Ruslan Chinakhov	(Canada) Alex Pagulayan	175-(-2)
2020	Not held due to the COVID-19 pandemic					
2021	October 19-23	Q-Master Billiards	Virginia Beach, VA, USA	(Germany) Joshua Filler	(Russia) Fedor Gorst	150-89
2022	October 24-29	Q-Master Billiards	Virginia Beach, VA, USA	(Switzerland) Dimitri Jungo	(Poland) Wiktor Zielinski	175-132
2023	October 25-31	Q-Master Billiards	Virginia Beach, VA, USA	(Austria) Mario He	(Philippines) Lee Vann Corteza	150-48
2024	November 23–26	Renaissance Resort	Saint Augustine, FL, USA	(Austria) Mario He	(Austria) Max Lechner	150-131
2025	November 14–23	Renaissance Resort	Saint Augustine, FL, USA	(Germany) Thorsten Hohmann	(Estonia) Denis Grabe	150–84

Women

Year	Date	Venue	Location	Winner	Finalist	Score
2021	October 19-23	Q-Master Billiards	Virginia Beach, VA, USA	(England) Kelly Fisher	(Germany) Pia Filler	100-46
2022	October 24-29	Q-Master Billiards	Virginia Beach, VA, USA	(Russia) Kristina Tkach	(Northern Ireland) Karen Corr	100-14
