= Player of the Season =

Player of the Season may refer to:

== In English football ==
- Premier League Player of the Season
- Luton Town F.C. Player of the Season
- Norwich City F.C. Player of the Season
- Reading F.C. Player of the Season
- Southampton F.C. Player of the Season
- Watford F.C. Player of the Season
- Stoke City F.C. Player of the Year

== Other uses ==
- PSL Player of the Season
- PSL Players' Player of the Season

== See also ==
- Player of the Year
