= Tyler Styer =

American pool player (born 1995)

Personal information
- Nickname: "Baby Faced Assassin"
- Born: 1 January 1995 (age 31) Vernon, Wisconsin, U.S.

Pool career
- Country: United States

Tyler Styer (born 12 January 1995) is an American professional pool player from Vernon, Wisconsin. Styer represented the United States at the 2018 Mosconi Cup and the 2019 Mosconi Cup. Styer was the winner of the 2019 Kremlin World Cup, defeating David Alcaide in the final.

Styer began playing pool in 2009, aged 14, before reaching 13th position at the 2013 WPA World Nine-ball Junior Championship.

Styer starred in the billiards movie, "The Tale of Texas Pool", released in December 2024.

== Career titles ==
- 2024 Midwest Billiards and Cue Expo 9-Ball
- 2024 Chuck Markulis Memorial 9-Ball
- 2023 Texas Open Nine-ball Championship
- 2021 Arcadia Virtual Ghost Battle of the Sexes
- 2019 Mosconi Cup
- 2019 ABN Dream Challenge Team USA vs. Russia
- 2019 Kremlin Cup
- 2018 Mosconi Cup
- 2018 ABN Dream Challenge Team USA vs. Russia
