= Player of the Year =

Several sports leagues honour their best player with an award called Player of the Year. In the United States, this type of award is usually called a Most Valuable Player (MVP) award.

== Association football ==
In association football, this award is held on both an international and national level.

- FIFA awards a worldwide men's and women's FIFA World Player of the Year, football's highest individual honour.
- English football leagues honour the PFA Players' Player of the Year and the PFA Young Player of the Year.
- Scotland has similar awards, the Scottish PFA Players' Player of the Year and the Scottish PFA Young Player of the Year.
- Many organizations award "footballer of the year" awards. Among them are the European Footballer of the Year, Best Footballer in Asia, African Footballer of the Year, and in English football the Football Writers' Association's FWA Footballer of the Year.
- Most clubs and teams run their own awards on an annual basis, sometimes chosen by the managers and coaches, but often by the fans.

== Baseball ==
In baseball, publications sometimes issue awards with this name:

- The Sporting News awards a Major League Baseball player the TSN Player of the Year Award. This almost always goes to a position player, since this magazine also has separate awards for the best pitcher in each Major League.
- Similarly, Baseball America and USA Today designates their respective Minor League Player of the Year Award.

Several awards for amateur baseball also exist:

- The Golden Spikes Award is presented annually to the top amateur baseball players in the United States. It was jointly created by Major League Baseball and USA Baseball in 1978.
- The National Collegiate Baseball Writers Association awards the Dick Howser Trophy annually to the top college player in the United States.

Publications also issue annual player of the year awards, including Baseball America, Collegiate Baseball, and the American Baseball Coaches Association.

== Basketball ==
In American basketball, several such awards are given:

- The Oscar Robertson Trophy is awarded to the college basketball player of the year by the United States Basketball Writers Association.
- The Naismith College Player of the Year award is given to the best men's college player and the best women's college player.
- The John R. Wooden Award is given by the Los Angeles Athletic Club to the best men's college player and the best women's college player.
- The National Collegiate Athletic Association gives the Chip Hilton Player of the Year Award to the Division I men's basketball player who exemplifies the best character.
- The National Basketball Association awards an NBA Defensive Player of the Year Award. This is also known as the Hakeem Olajuwon Trophy.
- The Women's National Basketball Association awards a WNBA Defensive Player of the Year Award.

== Cricket ==
In cricket, awards for the leading international player are the Wisden Leading Cricketer in the World and the Sir Garfield Sobers Trophy.

== Gaelic football ==
In Gaelic football, it may mean Donegal GAA#Player of the Year.

== Ice hockey ==
In ice hockey, in the United Kingdom the Player of the Year Trophy is awarded by Ice Hockey Journalists UK.

== Lacrosse ==
In lacrosse, two awards are given with this name, the Major League Lacrosse Offensive player of the Year Award and the Major League Lacrosse Defensive player of the Year Award.

== Rugby league ==
In rugby league, player of the year awards include the Man of Steel in the Super League and the Dally M Medal in the National Rugby League.

== See also ==
- Athlete of the Year
- Most Valuable Player
- Player of the Season (disambiguation)
- Rookie of the Year (award)
