= Karl Boyes (pool player) =

English pool player (born 1982)

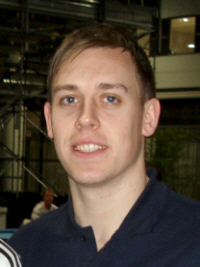

Personal information
- Nickname: "Box Office"
- Born: 4 November 1982 (age 43) Bradford, England

Pool career
- Country: England
- Pool games: Straight Pool, 9-ball, 8-ball
- Best finish: Semi finals 2013 WPA World Nine-ball Championship

Tournament wins
- World Champion: Eight-ball (2010)

Karl Boyes (born 4 November 1982) is an English professional pool player. Boyes is a former 8-ball world champion and has won the Mosconi Cup four times representing Team Europe.

== Career ==
He won the 2010 world 8-ball championships. In the final, Boyes had the much better start and led Niels Feijen 4-0 and 11–5, before his opponent started a catch-up and levelled at 12-12. Boyes won the final rack, winning 13–12. Boyes first victory on the Euro Tour came at the 2010 Austrian Open, where after defeating compatriot Chris Melling 9‍–‍7 in the semi-finals, he clinched the title with a 9‍–‍6 win against Nick van den Berg in the final. In 2012, Boyes won the World Series of Pool Speed Pool title, beating Darren Appleton in the final.

Boyes has been a part of four Mosconi Cup teams, competing for Europe in 2010, 2013, 2014 and 2015. In all of these seasons, Europe would defeat the USA. Boyes and Darren Appleton won the World Cup of Pool in 2014 after beating Netherlands in the final 10‍–‍9. It marked the first time that England had won the competition.

Boyes reached the final of the 2015 US Open Nine-ball Championship but was defeated 6‍–‍11 by Cheng Yu-hsuan in the final. Boyes reached the semi-finals of the World Pool Masters in Gibraltar in 2018. After beating Ralf Souquet in their quarter-final match, Boyes was then defeated in the last four by Niels Feijen 3‍–‍8. In 2021, Boyes and Appleton formed an England C team at the World Cup of Pool, receiving a late call up after a withdrawal. They reached the final after whitewashing Slovakia in the semi-finals before losing 6‍–‍11 to Germany in the final.

In 2024 it was announced that Boyes would be the captain of Team Europe in the inaugural Reyes Cup versus Team Asia. The event would be similar in format to the Mosconi Cup. Asia would go on to win 11–6 in Manila.

== Personal life ==
Boyes was born in Bradford, West Yorkshire. He began playing pool, mainly English 8-ball, as a teenager in pubs in Manchester. He is a cousin of professional darts player Joe Cullen.

In November 2020, Boyes started a self-named YouTube channel. On the channel, he uploads pool tutorial videos as well as lessons and tips.

== Career achievements ==
- 2015 Mosconi Cup
- 2014 World Cup of Pool - with (Darren Appleton)
- 2014 Mosconi Cup
- 2013 Southern Classic Bigfoot 10-Ball Challenge
- 2013 Mosconi Cup
- 2012 Guinness Speed Pool Championship
- 2010 Mosconi Cup
- 2010 WPA World Eight-ball Championship
- 2010 WPA World Team Championship
- 2010 Euro Tour Austria Open
