= Mike Dechaine =

American professional pool player

Personal information
- Born: 30 May 1987 (age 39) Waterville, Maine, U.S.

Pool career
- Country: United States
- Pool games: 9-Ball

Mike Dechaine (born May 30, 1987, in Waterville, Maine) is an American professional pool player. Dechaine began playing pool aged 11, representing the USA on four occasions at the Mosconi Cup.

== Titles & Achievements ==
- 2025 Smokey Mountain 9-Ball Shootout
- 2025 Maine State 9-Ball Championship
- 2024 Maine 9-Ball Open
- 2018 Super Billiards Expo Players Championship
- 2017 Gotham City Pro 9-Ball Classic
- 2012 Turning Stone Classic
- 2011 Ultimate 10-Ball Championship
- 2009 World Summit of Pool
