= Skyler Woodward =

American pool player (born 1993)

Personal information
- Nickname: "Bluegrass Badass"
- Born: 7 May 1993 (age 33) Paducah, Kentucky, United States

Pool career
- Country: United States
- Turned pro: 2012
- Pool games: 8-Ball, 9-Ball, 10-Ball
- Best finish: Quarter finals 2021 WPA World Nine-ball Championship

Skyler Woodward (born May 7, 1993) is an American professional pool player. At the 2017 World Cup of Pool, he was the runner up, alongside Shane Van Boening. Woodward has represented the United States each year in the Mosconi Cup since the 2015 Mosconi Cup. At the 2018 and 2019 events Woodward was voted the Most Valuable Player.

His entrance walk-on music is "Rock and Roll" by Led Zeppelin.

== Career titles & Achievements ==
- 2025 Houston Open 9-Ball
- 2025 Mini Derb Open One Pocket
- 2024 Pennsylvania Open 9-Ball
- 2024 Big Tyme Classic 9-Ball
- 2023 Midwest Billiards and Cue Expo One Pocket
- 2022 Racks on the Rocks 9-Ball
- 2022 Buffalo's Pro Classic 9-Ball
- 2022 Southeastern Triple Crown Bank Pool
- 2021 Action Palace Open 8-Ball
- 2020 Music City Classic 9-Ball
- 2019 Mosconi Cup (MVP)
- 2019 Mosconi Cup
- 2019 ABN Dream Challenge Team USA vs. Russia
- 2019 Texas Open 9-Ball Championship
- 2019 CSI U.S. Open 8-Ball Championship
- 2019 Derby City Classic Master of the Table
- 2019 Derby City Classic 9-Ball
- 2019 Derby City Classic Bank Pool Ring Game
- 2018 Mosconi Cup (MVP)
- 2018 Mosconi Cup
- 2018 ABN Dream Challenge Team USA vs. Russia
- 2018 Midwest Bar Table Classic 9-Ball
- 2017 Don Coates Memorial 10-Ball
- 2017 World Pool Series RYO Rack Classic
- 2017 CSI US Bar Table 10-Ball Championship
- 2017 Music City Classic 9-Ball
- 2016 Chinook Winds Open 8-Ball
- 2016 Chinook Winds Open 10-Ball
- 2016 Music City Classic
- 2016 Texas Open 10-Ball Championship
- 2016 Music City Classic
- 2015 Young Guns vs Old School - with (Justin Bergman)
- 2015 Carom Room Spring Classic 8-Ball
- 2015 Texas Open 9-Ball Championship
- 2014 Big Tyme Classic 9-Ball
- 2014 Smokin Aces Bar Box 9-Ball Open
- 2014 Derby City Classic Bank Pool Ring Game
