= Jeremy Jones (pool player) =

American pool player

Jeremy Jones One Pocket Hall of Fame
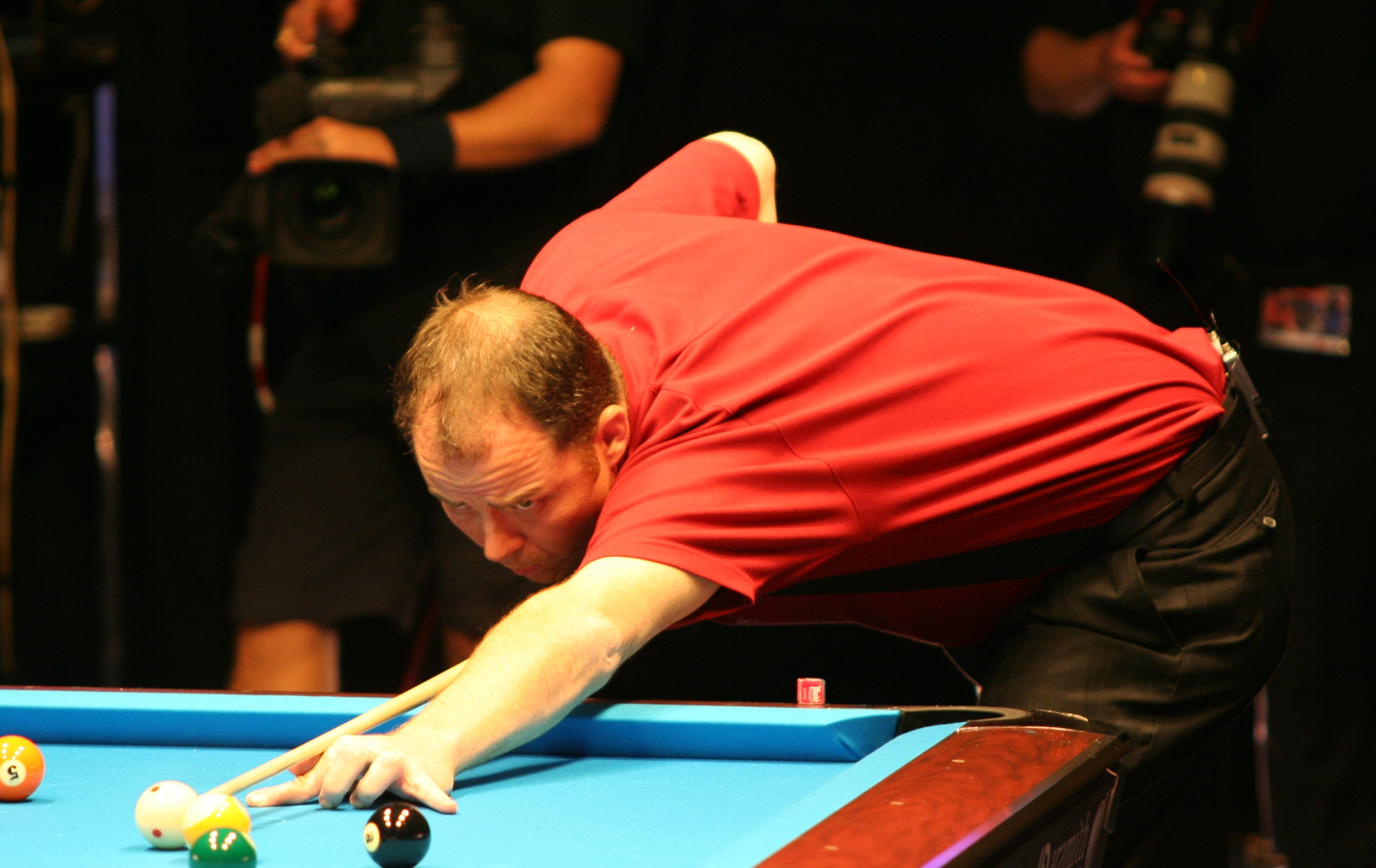
- Jones in the 2008 Mosconi Cup

Personal information
- Nickname: "Double J"
- Born: 30 April 1971 (age 55) Baytown, Texas, U.S.

Pool career
- Country: United States
- Turned pro: 1994
- Pool games: 9-Ball, One-pocket
- Best finish: 9-Ball (1999) Runner-up

Tournament wins
- Major: 2003 US Open Nine-ball
- Highest rank: 1

Jeremy Jones (born April 30, 1971, in Baytown, Texas) is a professional pool player. He was the 1998 US Open One Pocket champion, the 2003 US Open 9 Ball champion, and has represented Team USA in the Mosconi Cup on seven occasions. Jones was the runner-up at the 1999 WPA World Nine-ball Championship losing 13–8 to Nick Varner in the final.

== Personal life ==
Jones was first introduced to pool at the age of 17, while he was working as a pizza delivery man in Houston, Texas. He then went on to quit his delivery job and got a job at a game room, in order to be able to play pool for free.

After playing pool with friends for many years, Jones began competing in amateur tournaments around the United States.

In 1997, Jones won the BCA National 8-Ball Masters, finishing as runner-up the previous year. In 2008 he won the BCA 9-Ball Open.

He married Amy Jones and they reside in Dallas, Texas.

Jones starred in the sports documentary, "The Tale of Texas Pool", released on December 25, 2024.

== Professional career ==
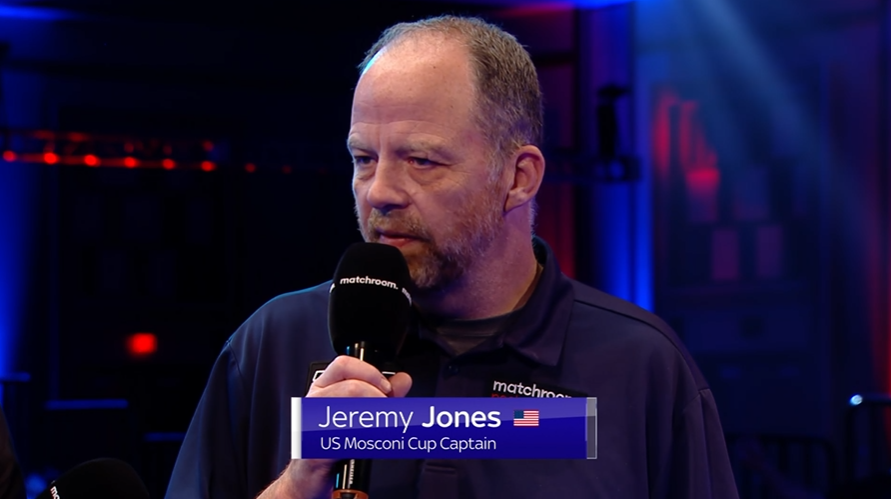
Jones commentating at 2021 US Open

In 1994, he decided to go professional and toured all but 2 of the 50 states in the United States. In 1998, he won the U.S. Open One-Pocket Championship, and in 2003, he won the U.S. Open 9-Ball Championship.

In January 2018, Jeremy Jones was inducted into the One Pocket Hall of Fame for his Outstanding Contribution to the Legacy of One Pocket.

Jones was a commentator at the Matchroom Multi Sport 2021 US Open in Atlantic City, New Jersey. He also competed in the event. Jones has been captain of Team USA for the Mosconi Cup in 2020 and 2021. He was vice captain for Team USA at the Mosconi Cup in 2019.

== Career titles and achievements ==
- 1994 Texas Open 9-Ball Championship
- 1997 BCA National 8-Ball Masters
- 1998 U.S. Open One-Pocket Championship
- 1999 Camel Pro Billiards 9-Ball Open
- 1999 Mosconi Cup
- 2000 Mosconi Cup
- 2001 Mosconi Cup
- 2001 Lexington Open
- 2002 Texas Open 9-Ball Championship
- 2003 U.S. Open 9-Ball Championship
- 2003 Mosconi Cup
- 2003 Texas Open 9-Ball Championship
- 2005 Mosconi Cup
- 2007 Houston Open
- 2008 BCA Open Nine-ball Championship
- 2012 Space City Open One Pocket
- 2018 One Pocket Hall of Fame
