= Darren Appleton =

English pool player (born 1976)

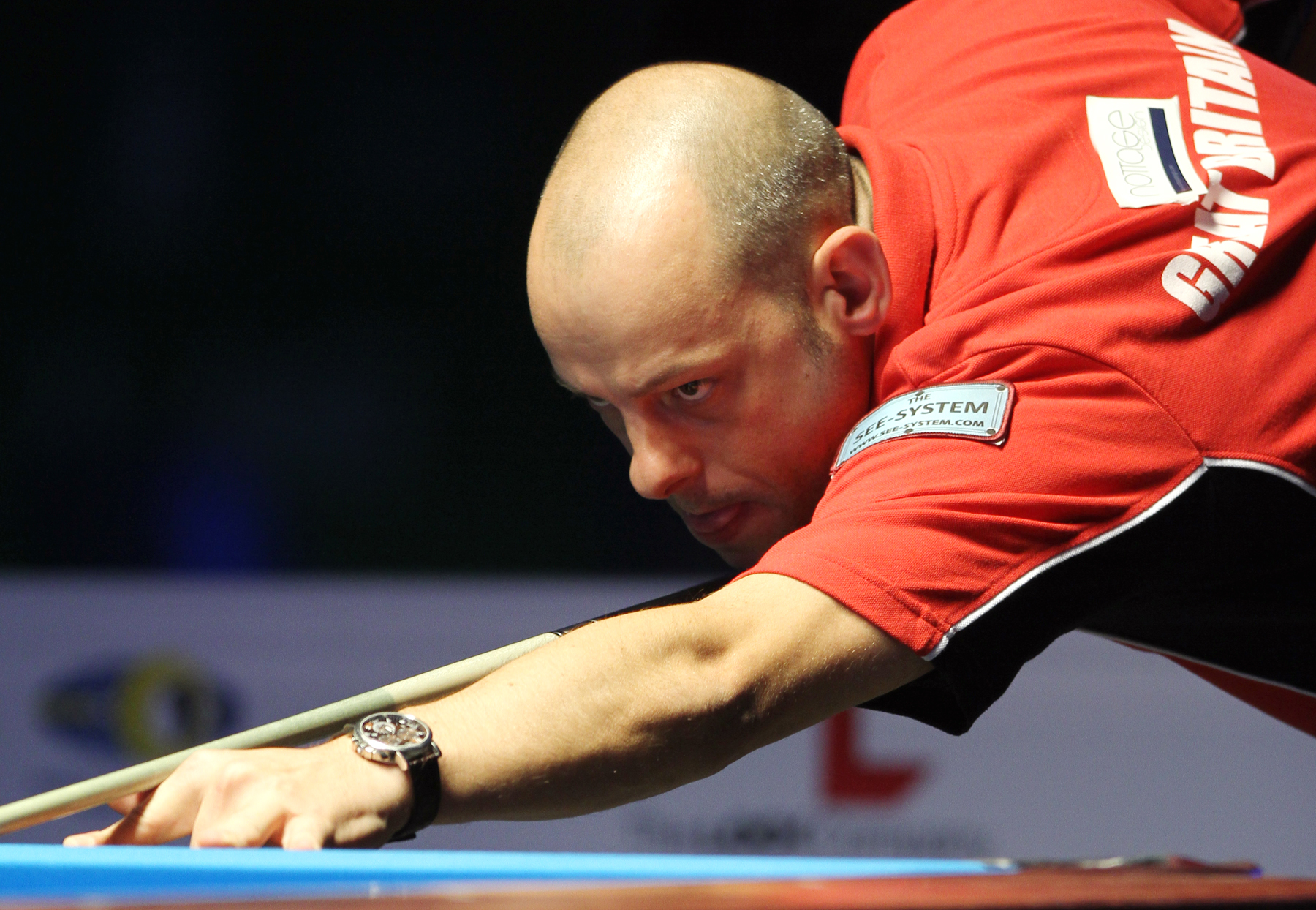
- Appleton at the World 9-Ball Pool Championship in Doha, 2012

Personal information
- Nickname: "Dynamite"
- Born: 8 February 1976 (age 50) Pontefract, West Yorkshire, England

Pool career
- Country: England
- Pool games: 9-Ball, Ten-ball, 8-ball

Tournament wins
- World Champion: Ten-Ball (2008), Nine-Ball (2012), Heyball (2015)
Medal record
Representing United Kingdom
Men's Nine-ball
World Games
Gold medal – first place	2013 Cali	Singles

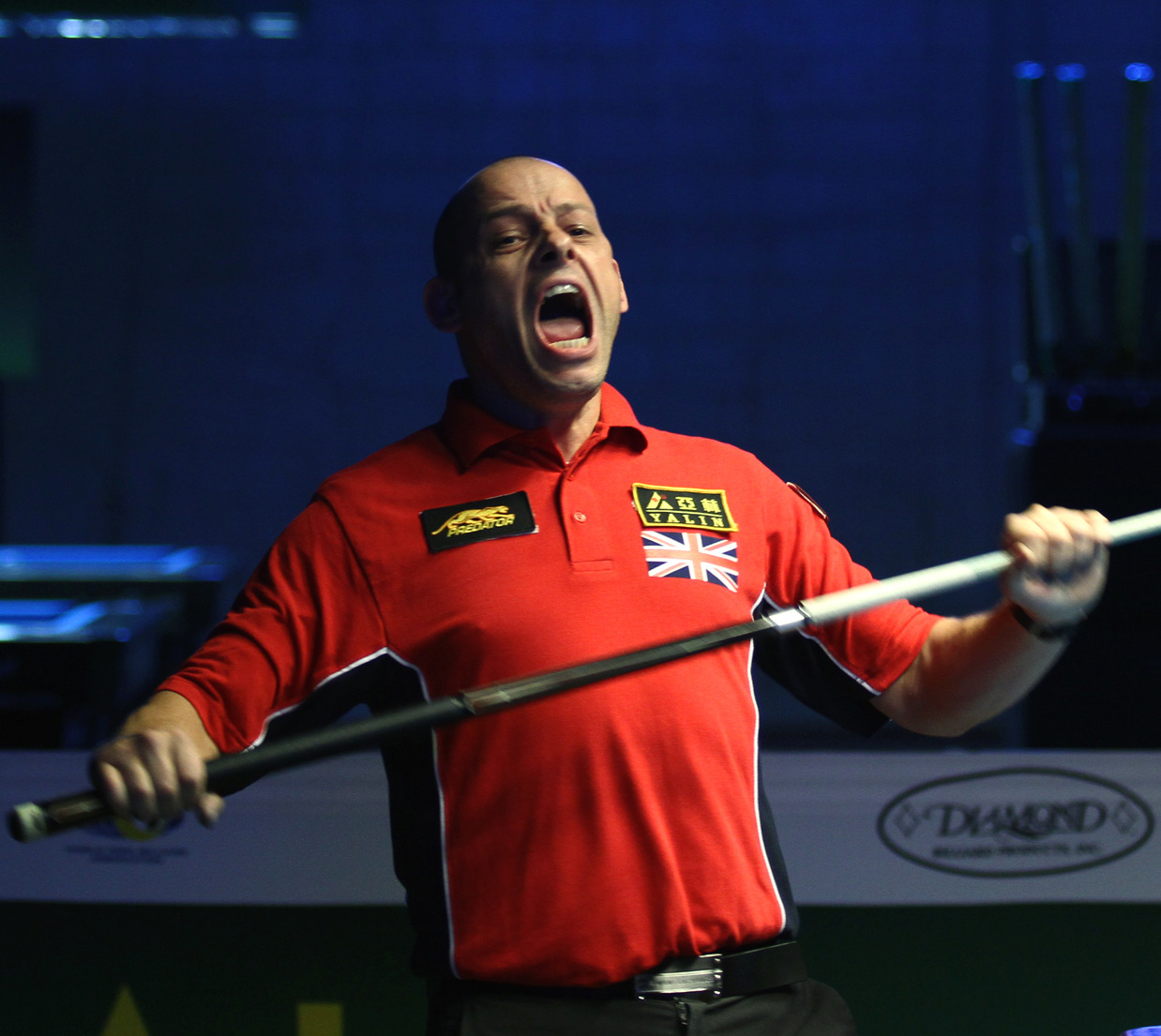
Appleton after winning the World 9-Ball Pool Championship

Darren Appleton (born 8 February 1976) is an English professional pool player, best known for playing Eight-ball, Nine-ball and Ten-ball pool.

Appleton won the 2008 WPA World Ten-ball Championship (the inaugural 10-ball world championship) against Wu Jia-qing, of China, a former world champion in both nine-ball and eight-ball. Appleton is also a world champion in nine-ball, having won the 2012 WPA World Nine-ball Championship, defeating Li Hewen in the final.

== Career ==
=== Early career ===
Appleton, who started playing pool at age 12, was formerly the world ranked no. 1 player in British-style eight-ball pool. He was twice runner-up in the WEPF Eight-ball Pool World Championship. In 2006, he joined the International Pool Tour's standardised eight-ball competition. In 2008, he won the Straight Pool Challenge at the Derby City Classic.

=== World Ten-ball Champion (2008–2012) ===
On 5 October 2008, Appleton claimed an upset victory in the inaugural WPA Ten-ball World Championship over Wu Jia-qing, 13–11, winning the US$100,000 top prize: "I've waited 16 years for this and have to enjoy the moment. I had mixed feelings and I was looking back at my disappointments in the past. I was ranked first (earlier in the decade) in the world but I have never won a world championship... It was a dream come true for me and I'm happy to win the title here in the Philippines."

In May 2009, Appleton challenged Dennis Hatch of the United States in a three-day race-to-100 challenge match of ten-ball. Hatch, however, came out the victor with a score of 100–83. In the same year, he won the World Pool Masters tournament by defeating Nick van den Berg.

Darren Appleton also won the 2010 U.S. Open 9-ball Championship against Corey Deuel of the United States in a match that went into extra racks. Appleton was a member of the victorious European team in the 2010 Mosconi Cup. He was named MVP for the tournament, after winning 5 of his 6 matches in the series. In 2011 he defended his title, winning the U.S. Open 9-Ball Championship again.

=== World Nine-ball Champion (2012–present) ===
In 2012, Appleton won the WPA World Nine-ball Championship, subduing China's Li Hewen in the final with a score of 13–12. Later, in 2013, he also won the nine-ball tournament at the World Games 2013, beating Chang Jung-lin 11–10 in the final. In 2014, he won the Dragon 14.1 Tournament, defeating Shane Van Boening in the final. Also he won 2014 World Cup of Pool playing with Karl Boyes for Team England. On 2 February 2015, Darren Appleton won the 2015 WPA World Heyball Championship, defeating world champion snooker player Mark Selby 21–19 in the final.

== Titles and achievements ==
- 2024 Ultimate Pool Louisiana Shootout
- 2017 Billiard Congress of America Hall of Fame
- 2017 Super Billiards Expo One Pocket Championship
- 2016 Mosconi Cup
- 2016 Super Billiards Expo One Pocket Championship
- 2015 Mosconi Cup
- 2015 WPA World Heyball Championship
- 2015 Kings Cup 10-Ball Team East vs. West
- 2015 American Straight Pool Championship
- 2014 Mosconi Cup
- 2014 Accu-Stats All-Star Invitational
- 2014 Dragon 14.1 Tournament
- 2014 Accu-Stats 8-Ball Invitational
- 2014 American Straight Pool Championship
- 2013 EPBF Player of the Year
- 2013 Mosconi Cup
- 2013 World Games Nine-ball Singles
- 2013 West Coast Challenge 10-Ball
- 2013 Derby City Classic 14.1 Challenge
- 2013 West Coast Challenge One Pocket
- 2012 Mosconi Cup
- 2012 International Challenge of Champions
- 2012 WPA World Nine-ball Championship
- 2011 Mosconi Cup
- 2011 U.S. Open 9-Ball Championship
- 2011 International Challenge of Champions
- 2011 Beassy 9-Ball Open
- 2011 World Cup of Pool - with (Karl Boyes)
- 2010 Billiards Digest Player of the Year
- 2010 Mosconi Cup (MVP)
- 2010 Mosconi Cup
- 2010 WPA World Team Championship
- 2010 U.S. Open 9-Ball Championship
- 2010 Euro Tour Costa Blanca Open
- 2009 World Pool Masters
- 2008 Derby City Classic 14.1 Challenge
- 2009 CSI US Bar Table 10-Ball Championship
- 2009 EPBF Nations Cup Championship
- 2008 Euro Tour Italy Open
- 2008 WPA World Ten-ball Championship
- 2007 International 8-ball Championship
- 2006 BCA Grand Masters 8-ball

Inaugural champion	WPA World Ten-ball Champion; 2008	Succeeded by Mika Immonen
Preceded by Yukio Akagariyama	WPA World Nine-ball Champion; 2012	Succeeded by Thorsten Hohmann
