= Ralf Souquet =

German pool player

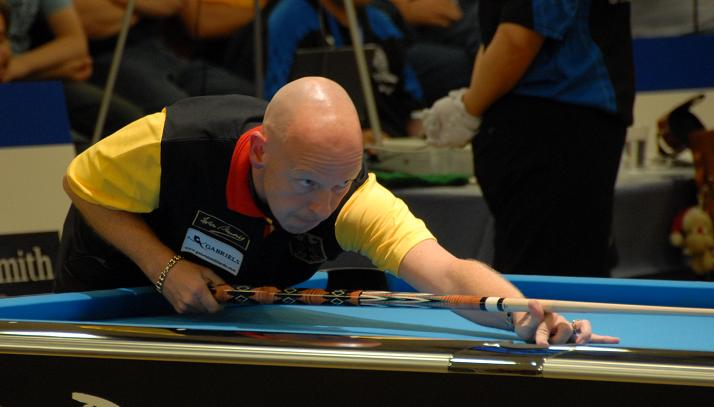
- Souquet at the European Championship 2008

Personal information
- Nickname: "The Kaiser"
- Born: 29 November 1968 (age 57) Eschweiler, West Germany

Pool career
- Country: Germany
- Turned pro: 1988
- Pool games: 8-ball, 9-ball

Tournament wins
- Other titles: 100
- World Champion: 8-Ball (2008), 9-Ball (1996)
- Current rank: 22
- Highest rank: 1
Medal record
Men's nine-ball
Representing Germany
World Games
Gold medal – first place	2009 Kaohsiung	Individual
Silver medal – second place	2001 Akita	Individual

Ralf Souquet (/suːˈkɛ/ soo-KEH; born 29 November 1968) is a German professional pool player. His nickname is "The Kaiser". Souquet is considered one of the greatest pool players of all time.

Since 1988, he has won over 100 professional tournaments, including 23 Euro Tour titles, 20 European Pool Championship and 12 German Pool Championship. Souquet is a two-time world champion, winning the 2008 WPA World Eight-ball Championship and 1996 WPA World Nine-ball Championship.

== Career ==
Souquet began playing billiards at the age of six in his parents' pub, practicing up to five hours per day. He won his first German Championship title at the age of fourteen in the juniors division. In 1985, Souquet co-won his first European Championship team title with the National Team, and in 1986 won his first individual title at the European Championship (juniors division).

In 1997, he received the Silberne Lorbeerblatt (Silver Laurel Leaf), the highest official distinction awarded to sportspeople by Germany, which was presented to him by German President Roman Herzog.

In 1996, Souquet won the WPA World Nine-ball Championship where he triumphed over Tom Storm of Sweden. He also reached the finals of the same event in 2001 and 2006, only to be bested by Mika Immonen and Ronato Alcano.

In 2000, Souquet won the BCA U.S. Open Straight Pool Championship and also won the U.S. Open 9-Ball Championship in 2002 by defeating Alex Pagulayan.

In 2008, Souquet won his second world title at the WPA World Eight-ball Championship with a victory over Alcano.

Souquet was named as captain of Team Rest of the World at the 2026 Reyes Cup.

== Titles and achievements ==
- 2025 Mexico Open Nine-ball
- 2022 European Pool Championship 8-Ball
- 2019 Athens Hill-Hill 9-Ball Open
- 2017 Mosconi Cup
- 2017 Euro Tour Klagenfurt Open
- 2017 Euro Tour Italian Open
- 2014 WPBL Bonus Ball Team Championship
- 2014 Euro Tour North Cyprus Open
- 2014 Interpool 9-Ball Open
- 2013 Mosconi Cup
- 2013 Euro Tour Castel Brando Open
- 2012 Derby City Classic 14.1 Challenge
- 2011 Billiard Congress of America Hall of Fame
- 2011 AZBilliards Player of the Year
- 2011 EPBF Player of the Year
- 2011 Mosconi Cup
- 2011 World Cup of Pool - with (Thorsten Hohmann)
- 2011 Euro Tour Hungary Open
- 2011 Super Billiard Expo Players Championship
- 2011 Euro Tour Italy Open
- 2011 World Pool Masters
- 2011 Euro Tour French Open
- 2010 Mosconi Cup
- 2010 European Pool Championship 9-Ball
- 2010 European Pool Championship 10-Ball
- 2009 EPBF Player of the Year
- 2009 Turning Stone Classic
- 2009 World Games Nine-ball Singles
- 2009 Euro Tour German Open
- 2008 AZBilliards Player of the Year
- 2008 Mosconi Cup
- 2008 Derby City Classic 9-Ball
- 2008 WPA World Eight-ball Championship
- 2008 Euro Tour Swiss Open
- 2008 Athens Gema 9-Ball Open
- 2008 Interpool Open 10-Ball Challenge
- 2008 Euro Tour Netherlands Open
- 2008 Interpool 9-ball Open
- 2007 Mosconi Cup
- 2006 Billiards Digest Player of the Year
- 2006 Derby City Classic 9-Ball
- 2006 World Pool Masters
- 2006 BCA Open Nine-ball Championship
- 2006 European Pool Championship 9-Ball
- 2004 Derby City Classic 9-Ball
- 2004 All Japan Championship 9-Ball
- 2004 World All Stars Invitational Team Cup
- 2002 IBC Japan Cup
- 2003 Euro Tour Belgium Open
- 2003 BCA Open Nine-ball Championship
- 2003 European Pool Championships 8-Ball
- 2002 Mosconi Cup
- 2002 U.S. Open Nine-ball Championship
- 2002 World Pool Masters
- 2002 Euro Tour Russian Open
- 2002 German Pool Championship 9-Ball
- 2002 IBC Holland Open
- 2002 IBC US Championship
- 2002 German Pool Championship 8-Ball
- 2001 Euro Tour Austrian Open
- 2001 German Pool Championship 8-Ball
- 2001 Euro Tour Lichtenstein Open
- 2001 German Pool Championship 9-Ball
- 2000 Simonis 10-ball Open
- 2000 World Pool Masters
- 2000 BCA U.S. Open Straight Pool Championship
- 2000 Euro Tour Lithuanian Open
- 2000 European Pool Championship 8-Ball
- 2000 German Pool Championship Team
- 1999 Camel Charlotte 10-Ball Open
- 1999 Euro Tour German Open
- 1999 Euro Tour Russian Open
- 1999 European Pool Championships 8-Ball
- 1999 Euro Tour Portugal Open
- 1998 European Pool Championship 9-Ball
- 1998 European Pool Championship 8-Ball
- 1998 Sands Regency 9-Ball Open
- 1997 Silbernes Lorbeerblatt Sports Award
- 1997 European Pool Championship 9-Ball
- 1997 German Pool Championship 8-Ball
- 1997 European Pool Championship 14.1
- 1996 World Pool Masters
- 1996 European Pool Championship 14.1
- 1996 International Challenge of Champions
- 1996 Euro Tour Germany Open
- 1996 WPA World Nine-ball Championship
- 1995 European Pool Championship 9-Ball
- 1995 European Pool Championship 8-Ball
- 1995 German Pool Championship 8-Ball
- 1995 European Pool Championship 14.1
- 1994 World Pool Masters
- 1994 Euro Tour Austrian Open
- 1994 European Pool Championship 8-Ball
- 1994 German Pool Championship 14.1
- 1993 Euro Tour Italy Open
- 1993 European Pool Championship 8-Ball
- 1993 Euro Tour Germany Open
- 1993 German Pool Championship 9-Ball
- 1992 European Pool Championship 8-Ball
- 1992 Euro Tour French Open
- 1992 German Pool Championship 9-Ball
- 1991 European Pool Championship 8-Ball
- 1991 Challenge Cup Nine-ball
- 1991 German Pool Championship 9-Ball
- 1989 European Pool Championship 8-Ball
- 1988 German Pool Championship 8-Ball
