= Niels Feijen =

Dutch pool player (born 1977)

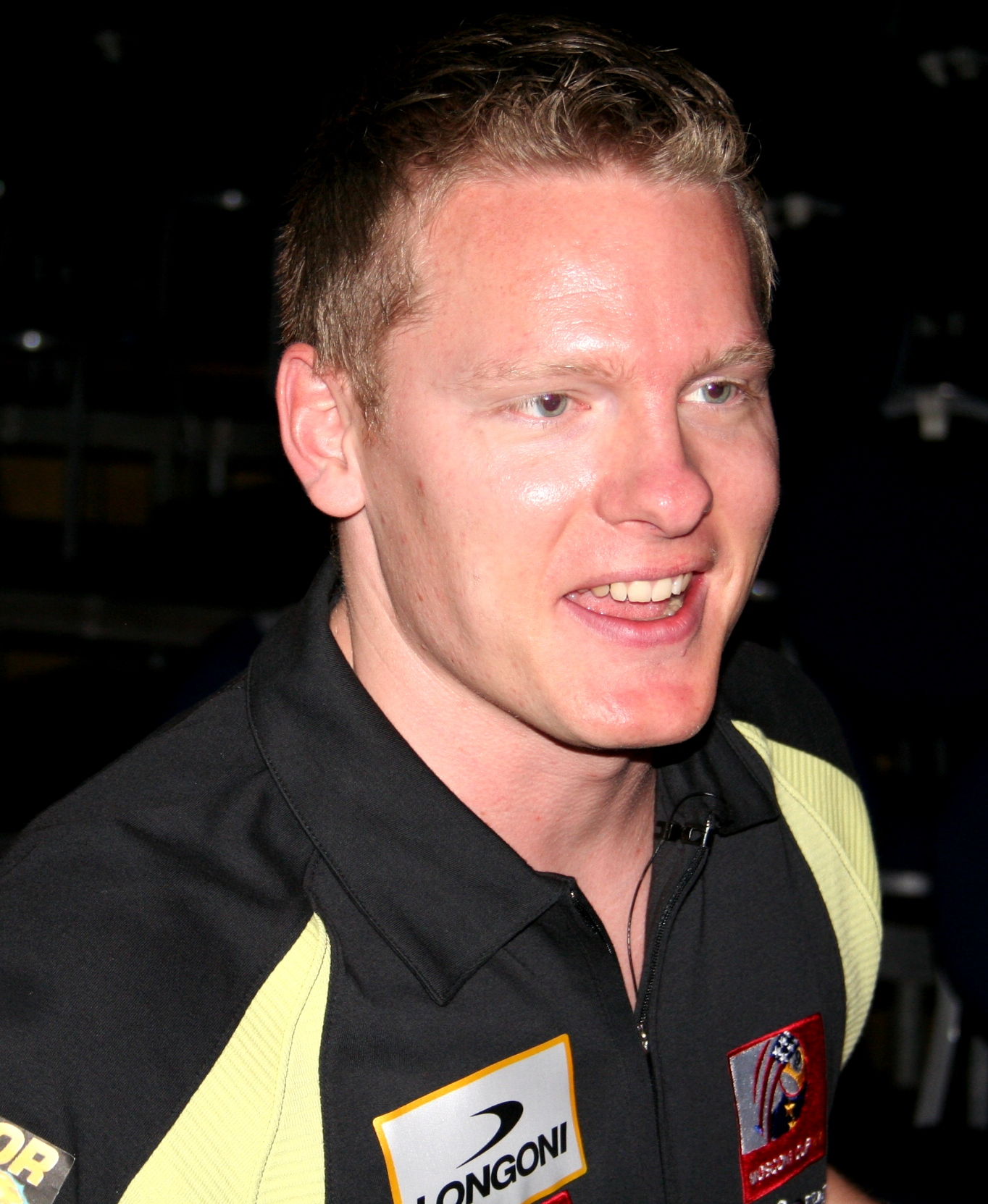
- Niels Feijen at the Mosconi Cup in 2008.

Personal information
- Nickname: "The Terminator"
- Born: 3 February 1977 (age 49) The Hague, Netherlands

Pool career
- Country: Netherlands
- Turned pro: 1997
- Pool games: 9-ball

Tournament wins
- World Champion: 9-Ball (2014), Straight Pool (2008)
- Highest rank: 1

Niels Feijen (Note: Dutch pronunciation: [ˈnils ˈfɛiə(n)]) (born 3 February 1977) is a Dutch professional pool player. Nicknamed The Terminator, he won the WPA World Nine-ball Championship in 2014.

== Career ==
In 2001, Feijen reached the finals of a nine-ball tournament in Tokyo, Japan. The event had a field of more than 700 players and offered the largest prize money at that time. However, he lost to Efren Reyes. In 2004, he won the inaugural Skins Billiards Championship with prize money of US$42,500. Feijen has won the European straight pool championship five times. In 2005 he was the winner of the Big Apple Nine-ball Championship, held in Queens, New York, an event with 128 of the world's best players. He represented Europe in the 2001, 2004–5, 2007-9 and 2011-16 Mosconi Cup events.

Feijen won the 2007 $50,000 winner-take-all International Challenge of Champions by defeating Lee Vann Corteza. In 2008, Feijen won the World Straight Pool Championship with a victory over Francisco Bustamante in the finals. On 5 October 2008, he received the 3rd prize of $25,000 in the inaugural WPA World Ten-ball Championship.

In 2010, Feijen reached the finals of the WPA World Eight-ball Championship but ended up in 2nd place losing to Karl Boyes of Great Britain. He would reach the finals of that same tournament again the next year, and was defeated by Dennis Orcollo of the Philippines. 2014 has been the best year so far for Feijen, who won the European Straight Pool Championship, the European 9-ball Championship and the 2014 WPA World Nine-ball Championship. In 2015 he was voted Most Valuable Player of the Mosconi Cup for the fourth time in the last five years.

Feijen has been a winner of events on the Euro Tour on 11 occasions, putting him third only behind Ralf Souquet (23) and Oliver Ortmann (14) in number of victories on the tour. His latest victory was at the 2022 Austria Open. He was inducted into the Billiard Congress of America Hall of Fame in July 2023.

In September 2026, Feijen was announced as the new captain of Team Europe for the 2026 Mosconi Cup.

== Career titles ==
- 2026 Cavero NK Pool (9-ball)
- 2025 OrangeForks Lelystad Nine-ball Open
- 2025 Super Billiards Expo Players Championship
- 2025 Cavero NK Pool (9-ball)
- 2024 European Pool Championship 14.1
- 2023 Billiard Congress of America Hall of Fame
- 2023 Longoni Bosnian Open
- 2022 Euro Tour Austria Open
- 2022 European Pool Championship 9-Ball
- 2019 Diamond Las Vegas Open
- 2019 WPA Players Championship Consolation Event
- 2018 Kremlin Cup
- 2018 European Pool Championship 14.1
- 2018 World Pool Masters
- 2017 Predator Bucharest Open
- 2017 European Pool Championship 14.1
- 2016 Mosconi Cup
- 2016 American Straight Pool Championship
- 2016 Euro Tour Dutch Open
- 2016 Predator Bucharest Open
- 2015 Mosconi Cup (MVP)
- 2015 Mosconi Cup
- 2015 Euro Tour Austria Open
- 2015 European Pool Championship 8-Ball
- 2015 Euro Tour Italian Open
- 2014 Mosconi Cup (MVP)
- 2014 Mosconi Cup
- 2014 European Pool Championship 14.1
- 2014 WPA World Nine-ball Championship
- 2014 European Pool Championship 9-Ball
- 2013 Mosconi Cup (MVP)
- 2013 Mosconi Cup
- 2013 European Pool Championship 9-Ball
- 2013 Euro Tour Austria Open
- 2013 World Pool Masters
- 2012 Mosconi Cup
- 2011 Mosconi Cup (MVP)
- 2011 Mosconi Cup
- 2010 Euro Tour French Open
- 2009 Euro Tour French Open
- 2008 Mosconi Cup
- 2008 Euro Tour Costa del Sol Open
- 2008 WPA World Straight Pool Championship
- 2007 Mosconi Cup
- 2007 Derby City Classic 9-Ball
- 2007 International Challenge of Champions
- 2007 European Pool Championship 14.1
- 2005 Euro Tour Netherlands Open
- 2005 Big Apple 9-Ball Championship
- 2005 Euro Tour Belgium Open
- 2004 European Pool Championship 14.1
- 2004 Skins Billiards Championship
- 2003 European Pool Championship 14.1
- 2002 European Pool Championship 14.1
- 2001 Euro Tour Finland Open
