= Shane Van Boening =

American pool player (born 1983)

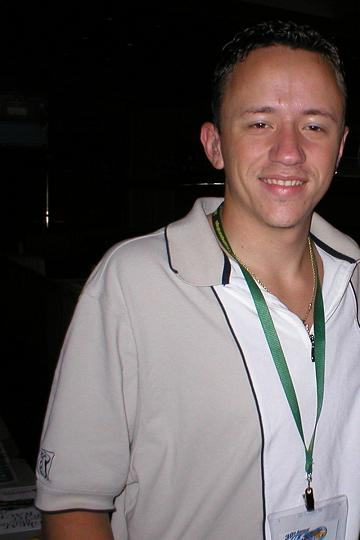
- Van Boening in 2003

Personal information
- Nicknames: "The South Dakota Kid", "Captain America"
- Born: July 14, 1983 (age 43) Rapid City, South Dakota, U.S.
- Height: 5 ft 11 in (180 cm)

Pool career
- Country: United States
- Turned pro: 2005
- Pool games: Nine-ball, Ten-ball, Eight-ball, One-pocket, Banks

Tournament wins
- Other titles: 100
- World Champion: 9-ball (2022), 8-ball (2023)
- Highest rank: 1

Shane Van Boening (/ˌvæn ˈboʊnɪŋ/; born July 14, 1983) is an American professional pool player from Rapid City, South Dakota. Van Boening is considered one of the best players of all time. Van Boening has won the WPA World Nine-ball Championship and has won the US Open Nine-ball Championship on 5 occasions, along with over 100 other professional titles.

Van Boening has a hearing impairment and uses a hearing aid, but it does not affect his pool ability. He has received praise for his attitude towards the sport, particularly for his behavior during matches, and for avoiding alcohol.

== Professional career ==
Van Boening has a family background in pool. His grandfather, Gary Bloomberg, was a trick-shot artist; his grandmother, Jeanne Bloomberg, a VNEA national champion; his mother, Timi Bloomberg, a BCA national champion; and his aunt, Gari Jo Bloomberg, a three-time VNEA national champion.

Van Boening defeated Hungarian Vilmos Földes at the International Pool Tour qualifier in 2006, and was one of several players to earn a bonus of US$5,000 for breaking and running six consecutive racks in tournament play. He was one of 10 players to earn their IPT tour card by finishing in the top two spots of one of five qualifiers, and won the second spot held at the Pool Room in Atlanta, Georgia. He has been ranked number one in the world by AZBilliards.com. He practices at Lucky Billiards in Sioux Falls, where he is the house pro and co-owner.

Van Boening is a three-time VNEA national amateur eight-ball champion. In 2007, he reached the final of the BCA Open Nine-ball Championship, losing to Dennis Orcollo. A few days later, he won the Predator International Ten-ball Championship.

In 2007, Van Boening was tipped by Inside POOL Magazine as a possible future best pool player in the US. Van Boening captured the hot seat in the World Summit of Pool on June 16, 2007, beating 2004 WPA Men's World Nine-ball Champion Alex Pagulayan 11–4. On the last day, all matches were shortened to best of 13 as they were being recorded by ESPN. Pagulayan beat Francisco Bustamante and Warren Kiamco to face Van Boening in the final. Van Boening came back from 4–1 behind to tie the score 5–5, before Pagulayan won the next two games win, 7–5.

Mark Griffin, owner of the Billiard Congress of America Pool League, began sponsoring Van Boening in 2007. On October 20, 2007, Van Boening won the 32nd US Open Nine-ball Championship, defeating Filipino champion Ronato Alcano in the finals by 13–10. Van Boening remained undefeated in the double-elimination format of the championship, held in Chesapeake, Virginia. At the Reno Open Nine-ball Championship on December 9, 2007, Van Boening and Johnny Archer were in the double-elimination finals. Archer was undefeated until then, and Van Boening had to beat him twice; Van Boening won the first set, and 83 minutes later, claimed the championship.

He has been named "Player of the Year" by the Billiards Digest Magazine and "AZBilliards" in 2007, 2011, 2012, 2013, 2014 and 2018. In 2020, he was named "Player of the Decade" for the 2010s by the Billiards Digest Magazine.

In April 2022, Van Boening won the 2022 WPA World Nine-ball Championship.

As of 2023, He holds the record for the AZBilliards Money List at over $2 million in earnings since 2005. The AZBilliards Money List has recorded tournament results of players, primarily in the United States, since the early 2000s. In 2023, Van Boening was featured on 60 Minutes.

== Career titles and achievements ==
- 2026 Reyes Cup
- 2026 Florida Open Nine-ball Championship
- 2026 Midwest Billiards and Cue Expo One Pocket
- 2026 USA National Nine-ball Championship
- 2026 Derby City Classic Master of the Table
- 2026 Derby City Classic One Pocket
- 2025 Texas Open Nine-ball Championship
- 2025 Midwest Billiards and Cue Expo 9-Ball
- 2025 Midwest Billiards and Cue Expo One Pocket
- 2025 Big Tyme Classic One Pocket
- 2025 Ultimate Pool Iowa Shootout 8-Ball
- 2025 U.S. Open Eight-ball pool championship
- 2025 U.S. Open Ten-ball Championship
- 2024 International Bigfoot Ten-ball Open
- 2024 Battle of the Bull One Pocket
- 2024 Texas Open One Pocket Championship
- 2024 Predator Big Easy Classic Nine-ball
- 2024 Predator Big Easy Classic One Pocket
- 2024 Weir Memorial Nine-ball
- 2024 Billiard Congress of America Hall of Fame
- 2024 Premier League Pool
- 2024 CSI U.S. Open One-pocket Championship
- 2024 CSI U.S. Open Bank Pool Championship
- 2024 CSI U.S. Open Ten-ball Championship
- 2024 Bayou State Classic Nine-ball
- 2024 Skinny Bob's One-pocket
- 2023 International Bigfoot Ten-ball Challenge
- 2023 WPA World Eight-ball Championship
- 2023 Weir Memorial Nine-ball
- 2023 Midwest Billiards and Cue Expo 9-Ball
- 2023 Derby City Classic Bigfoot Ten-ball Challenge
- 2022 Hex.com Pro-Am Eight-ball
- 2022 WPA World Nine-ball Championship
- 2021 Texas Open Nine-ball Championship
- 2021 Michael Montgomery Memorial
- 2021 Jay Swanson Memorial Nine-ball
- 2021 Midwest Billiards Expo One-pocket
- 2020 Turning Stone Classic
- 2020 Billiards Digest Player of the Decade – 2010s
- 2019 Mosconi Cup
- 2019 ABN Dream Challenge Team USA vs. Russia
- 2019 Dragon 14.1 Tournament
- 2019 Turning Stone Classic
- 2019 Midwest Billiards Expo One-pocket
- 2019 CSI U.S. Open Straight Pool Championship
- 2019 CSI U.S. Open Bank Pool Championship
- 2018 AZBilliards Player of the Year
- 2018 Mosconi Cup
- 2018 ABN Dream Challenge Team USA vs. Russia
- 2018 Euro Tour Dutch Open
- 2018 Turning Stone Classic
- 2018 CSI U.S. Open Eight-ball Championship
- 2018 U.S. Open Ten-ball Championship
- 2018 4-Bears Eight-ball Classic
- 2018 CSI U.S. Open One-pocket Championship
- 2018 CSI U.S. Open Bank Pool Championship
- 2017 ABN Dream Challenge Team USA vs. Russia
- 2017 CSI US Bar Table All-Around Title
- 2017 CSI US Bar Table Nine-ball Championship
- 2017 CSI US Bar Table Eight-ball Championship
- 2017 Turning Stone Classic
- 2017 CSI U.S. Open Ten-ball Championship
- 2017 Pac-West Invitational
- 2017 Accu-Stats One-pocket Invitational
- 2017 Super Billiards Expo Players Championship
- 2017 Chinook Winds Late Night Ten-ball
- 2016 US Open Nine-ball Championship
- 2016 Tornado Open Tne-ball Championship
- 2016 CSI US Bar Table Eight-ball Championship
- 2016 CSI U.S. Open Eight-ball Championship
- 2016 CSI U.S. Open Ten-ball Championship
- 2016 Derby City Classic Nine-ball
- 2015 Accu-Stats Ten-ball Invitational
- 2015 Kings Cup Ten-ball Team East vs. West
- 2015 International Challenge of Champions
- 2015 World Pool Masters
- 2015 CSI US Bar Table Nine-ball Championship
- 2015 Derby City Classic Bigfoot Ten-ball Challenge
- 2014 Billiards Digest Player of the Year
- 2014 World Pool Masters
- 2014 US Open Nine-ball Championship
- 2014 Carom Room Classic Mini Tournament
- 2014 Andy Mercer Memorial Nine-ball
- 2014 Super Billiards Expo Players Championship
- 2014 CSI US Bar Table All-around Title
- 2014 CSI US Bar Table Nine-ball Championship
- 2014 CSI US Bar Table Ten-ball Championship
- 2014 Derby City Classic Nine-ball
- 2014 Derby City Classic Bigfoot Ten-ball Challenge
- 2013 Billiards Digest Player of the Year
- 2013 US Open Nine-ball Championship
- 2013 Steinway Classic Ten-ball
- 2013 CSI U.S. Open Eight-ball Championship
- 2013 Accu-Stats Bigfoot One-Pocket Invitational
- 2013 Super Billiards Expo Players Championship
- 2013 Andy Mercer Memorial Nine-ball
- 2013 CSI US Bar Table Nine-ball Championship
- 2013 Turning Stone Classic
- 2012 Billiards Digest Player of the Year
- 2012 US Open Nine-ball Championship
- 2012 Andy Mercer Memorial Nine-ball
- 2012 CSI U.S. Open One-pocket Championship
- 2012 Super Billiards Expo Players Championship
- 2012 CSI US Bar Table Nine-ball Championship
- 2012 Derby City Classic Master of the Table
- 2012 Derby City Classic Nine-ball
- 2012 Derby City Classic One-pocket
- 2011 Billiards Digest Player of the Year
- 2011 Turning Stone Classic
- 2011 Steve Mizerak Ten-ball Championship
- 2011 Seminole Florida Pro Tour Stop
- 2011 Pool Ocho Open
- 2011 CSI U.S. Open Ten-ball Championship
- 2011 Runrunner Open Barbox Event
- 2011 Derby City Classic Master of the Table
- 2011 Derby City Classic One-pocket
- 2010 Gem City Classic
- 2010 Ultimate Ten-ball Championship
- 2010 Super Billiards Expo Players Championship
- 2010 CSI US Bar Table All-Around Title
- 2010 CSI US Bar Table Ten-ball Championship
- 2010 CSI US Bar Table Nine-ball Championship
- 2009 Mosconi Cup
- 2009 Andy Mercer Memorial Nine-ball
- 2009 Derby City Classic Nine-ball
- 2008 World Cup of Pool - with (Rodney Morris)
- 2008 Texas Open Nine-ball Championship
- 2008 Four Bears Eight-ball Classic
- 2008 Super Billiards Expo Players Championship
- 2008 CSI US Bar Table All-Around Title
- 2008 CSI US Bar Table Ten-ball Championship
- 2008 Derby City Classic Ten-ball Ring Game
- 2008 Derby City Classic Louie Roberts Award
- 2007 Billiards Digest Player of the Year
- 2007 Sands Regency Nine-ball Open
- 2007 US Open Nine-ball Championship
- 2007 Predator International Ten-ball Championship
