= 2007 WPA Men's World Nine-ball Championship =

2007 WPA World 9-Ball Championship
Tournament details
- Country: Philippines
- City: Pasay
- Venue: International Convention Center
- Dates: 3–11 November 2007
- Format: Double elimination / Single elimination
- Participants: 128

Final positions
- Champions: (England) Daryl Peach
- Runners-up: (Philippines) Roberto Gomez

The 2007 WPA World Nine-ball Championship was the 18th annual international nine-ball pool tournament for men sanctioned by the World Pool-Billiard Association (WPA). It was held at the Araneta Coliseum in Quezon City, Metro Manila, Philippines from 3–11 November 2007. It was the second consecutive time the tournament has been held in the Philippines.

The tournament is sponsored by Matchroom Sport, which has sponsored the event since 1999. 128 participants from 46 WPA member countries competed for US$400,000 in total prize money, including defending champion Ronato Alcano of the Philippines. The overall winner received a purse of $100,000, the highest-ever payout for the tournament.

== Format ==
The Format of qualifying used on 2006 was used for 2007. Several last-minute qualifying tournaments were held in the Metro Manila area a few weeks before the tournament starts.

All matches are in winner's break: the winner of the previous rack will break on the next rack, it was reverted from alternate break used in 2006.

There are 32 seeded players prior to the group stages; they are distributed 2 per group. The defending champion, Ronato Alcano, is seeded #1.

Also, a double-elimination tournament will be used for the group stages; instead of 32 groups of 4, there will be 16 groups of eight, with the top four advancing. Each player will be seeded 1–8 in their groups, with a routine double-elimination tournament following the first round; however the player that wins twice will advance to the quarterfinals and will not take part in other group matches, in contrast if a player loses two games, he is eliminated. The top four players in each group therefore would have won twice. After the group stages, the routine 64-man single elimination tournament follows.

In the initial group stages the format consists of races to 9 racks. The last 64 play races to 10 racks. This is followed by the round of 16 (quarterfinals and semifinals) where the races are to 11 racks. The race in the finals jumps to 17 racks.

== Notable occurrences ==
- On day 1, a group match (race to 9) between Charles Williams and Ricky Yang took over 2 and half hours to complete, with both players accused of playing too slowly. Calls were made for moves to outlaw overly-slow play in future years.
- On day 3, Jeremy Jones of the U.S. and Finland's Mika Immonen almost came to blows after Immonen eliminated Jones from contention, 9–6 at the group stages.
- There was high drama on day 4, Tuesday afternoon at the Big Dome when fire broke out in the lighting rig over Table 5 on the upper tier. Each of the outside tables has a light box with fluorescent tubes that light the table and a short circuit sent sparks flying and before long the box was ablaze. Matchroom Sport's John McDonald alerted venue staff and only his quick thinking saved the table as he and cameraman Lawrence 'Lol' Lustig covered it to stop debris and foam raining down onto the felt. Before long temporary lights were installed and play was able to commence at the designated time.
- On the quarterfinals, Francisco Bustamante, leading Daryl Peach 10–9 in a race to 11 match, failed to play position on the 3-ball and snookered himself behind the 9-ball. A kick shot struck both the 3 and 9 balls, fluking the 9 into a corner pocket. With the player and crowd celebrating the win, a lengthy inquiry began, in which the referee and tournament officials studied frame-by-frame replays of the shot, before concluding that the 9 had been struck first, and the shot was therefore a foul. After the lengthy break in play, in which Bustamante insisted the shot had been legal, Peach held his nerve amongst a partisan Filipino crowd to run the last two racks of the match to win 11–10, en route to his World Championship victory the following day.

== Players ==
=== By nation ===
The WPA considered the home nations of England and Scotland as separate entities for the tournament and the codes of "ENG" and "SCO" was subsequently shown in the TV broadcast instead of "GBR."

Champion
Runner-up
Semifinals
Quarterfinals
Last 16
Last 32
Last 64
Group stages

- 15 players: Philippines
- 14 players: Chinese Taipei (Taiwan)
- 11 players: United States
- 7 players: Germany
- 6 players: Canada and England
- 5 players: Japan
- 4 players: Australia
- 3 players: China, Holland (Netherlands), Indonesia, Italy, Poland, Scotland, Serbia and Singapore.
- 2 players: Chile, Hong Kong, Korea, Malaysia, Spain and Vietnam.
- 1 player: Austria, Belgium, Brunei, Croatia, Czech Republic, Denmark, Eritrea, Finland, Hungary, India, Iran, Ireland, Malta, New Zealand, Nicaragua, Qatar, Russia, Slovenia, South Africa, Sweden, Switzerland, Thailand, Turkey and UAE

=== Seeded ===
Seed	Name	Previous titles	2007 finish
1	(Philippines) Ronato Alcano	1 (2006)	Last 64
2	(Germany) Ralf Souquet	1 (1996)	Last 32
3	(Chinese Taipei) Wu Jia-qing	1 (2005)	Last 32
4	(Chinese Taipei) Yang Ching-shun	none	Last 64
5	(Germany) Thorsten Hohmann	1 (2003)	Group stage
6	(Philippines) Efren Reyes	1 (1999)	Last 64
7	(Chinese Taipei) Chang Jung-lin	none	Last 32
8	(Philippines) Alex Pagulayan	1 (2004)	Last 16
9	(Philippines) Francisco Bustamante	none	Quarterfinals
10	(Germany) Thomas Engert	none	Last 64
11	(Russia) Konstantin Stepanov	none	Last 16
12	(Finland) Mika Immonen	1 (2001)	Quarterfinals
13	(United States) Shane Van Boening	none	Last 32
14	(China) Li Hewen	none	Group stage
15	(United States) Johnny Archer	2 (1992, 1997)	Group stage
16	(Netherlands) Niels Feijen	none	Last 16

Seed	Name	Previous titles	2007 finish
17	(England) Daryl Peach	none	Champion
18	(Chinese Taipei) Chao Fong-pang	2 (1993, 2000)	Last 32
19	(Italy) Fabio Petroni	none	Last 64
20	(Philippines) Dennis Orcollo	none	Last 64
21	(Philippines) Lee Vann Corteza	none	Last 64
22	(United States) Rodney Morris	none	Group stage
23	(England) Imran Majid	none	Last 64
24	(United States) Corey Deuel	none	Last 16
25	(Spain) David Alcaide	none	Last 64
26	(Germany) Christian Reimering	none	Withdrew
27	(Malta) Tony Drago	none	Last 32
28	(Chinese Taipei) Fu Che-wei	none	Last 64
29	(Scotland) Jonni Fulcher	none	Group stage
30	(Vietnam) Lương Chí Dũng	none	Last 32
31	(Canada) Ronnie Wiseman	none	Group stage
32	(Indonesia) Ricky Yang	none	Group stage

=== Unseeded players who advanced to the round of 64 ===
Player boldfaced made it to the final.

- Group 1:
  - (United States) Charles Williams
  - (Netherlands) Alex Lely
  - (Germany) Harald Stolka
- Group 2:
  - (Philippines) Leonardo Andam
  - (Australia) James Delahunty
  - (England) Raj Hundal
- Group 3:
  - (Hungary) Vilmos Földes
  - (Poland) Radosław Babica
- Group 4:
  - (Chinese Taipei) Lu Hui-chan
  - (Philippines) Joven Bustamante
  - (Philippines) Antonio Gabica
- Group 5:
  - (Chinese Taipei) Ko Pin-yi
  - (Philippines) Jeff de Luna
  - (Canada) Edwin Montal
  - (Serbia) Sandor Tot
- Group 6:
  - (Japan) Kenichi Uchigaki
  - (Canada) Alain Martel
- Group 7:
  - (Philippines) Ramil Gallego
  - (Netherlands) Nick van den Berg
  - (Singapore) Chan Kwen-Kwang
- Group 8:
  - (Indonesia) Muhammad Zulfikri
  - (Croatia) Philipp Stojanovic
- Group 9:
  - (Germany) Oliver Ortmann
  - (Vietnam) Phan Tuan Ngoc
- Group 10:
  - (Australia) Louis Condo
  - (Chinese Taipei) Kuo Po-cheng
- Group 11:
  - (Switzerland) Marco Tschudi
  - (Denmark) Bahram Lofty
  - (South Korea) Rye Seung-Woo
- Group 12:
  - (England) Karl Boyes
  - (Serbia) Goran Mladenovic
- Group 13:
  - (Japan) Satoshi Kawabata
  - (Sweden) Marcus Chamat
- Group 14:
  - (Philippines) Marlon Manalo
  - (Serbia) Dejan Dabovic
- Group 15:
  - (Chinese Taipei) Lee Kung-fang
  - (Japan) Naoyuki Ōi
  - (Chinese Taipei) Wu Yun-lin
- Group 16:
  - (Philippines) **Roberto Gomez**
  - (Slovenia) Matjaz Erculj

== Group stage ==
=== Group 1 ===
Preliminaries
(Philippines) Ronato Alcano	9
(United Arab Emirates) Saeed Ahmed Al-Mutawa	3
(Netherlands) Alex Lely	8
(Germany) Harald Stolka	9
(China) Xu Meng	6
(United States) Charles Williams	9
(Indonesia) Ricky Yang	9
(Canada) Brady Gollan	4
1st playoff round
(United Arab Emirates) Saeed Ahmed Al-Mutawa	3
(Netherlands) Alex Lely	9
(China) Xu Meng	3
(Canada) Brady Gollan	9

Qualifiers
(Philippines) Ronato Alcano	9
(Germany) Harold Stolka	1
(United States) Charles Williams	9
(Indonesia) Ricky Yang	8
2nd playoff round
(Netherlands) Alex Lely	9
(Indonesia) Ricky Yang	8
(Canada) Brady Gollan	3
(Germany) Harold Stolka	9

=== Group 2 ===
Preliminaries
(Germany) Ralf Souquet	5
(Philippines) Leonardo Andam	9
(Singapore) Bernard Tey Choon Kiat	4
(England) Raj Hundal	9
(United States) Mike Davis	5
(Australia) James Delahunty	9
(Canada) Ronnie Wiseman	9
(Thailand) Tepwin Arunnath	7
1st playoff round
(Germany) Ralf Souquet	9
(Singapore) Bernard Tey Choon Kiat	6
(United States) Mike Davis	9
(Thailand) Tepwin Arunnath	5

Qualifiers
(Philippines) Leonardo Andam	9
(England) Raj Hundal	8
(Australia) James Delahunty	9
(Canada) Ronnie Wiseman	8
2nd playoff round
(Germany) Ralf Souquet	9
(Canada) Ronnie Wiseman	3
(United States) Mike Davis	5
(England) Raj Hundal	9

=== Group 3 ===
Preliminaries
(Chinese Taipei) Wu Jia-qing	9
(Nicaragua) Carlos Castro	4
(Poland) Radosław Babica	8
(Hungary) Vilmos Földes	9
(Chinese Taipei) Chu Hung-ming	9
(England) Craig Osborne	8
(Vietnam) Luong Chi-dung	9
(Japan) Kusano Hisashi	8
1st playoff round
(Nicaragua) Carlos Castro	7
(Poland) Radosław Babica	9
(England) Craig Osborne	9
(Japan) Kusano Hisashi	8

Qualifiers
(Chinese Taipei) Wu Jia-qing	7
(Hungary) Vilmos Földes	9
(Chinese Taipei) Chu Hung-ming	6
(Vietnam) Luong Chi-dung	9
2nd playoff round
(Poland) Radosław Babica	9
(Chinese Taipei) Chu Hung-ming	8
(England) Craig Osborne	4
(Chinese Taipei) Wu Jia-qing	9

=== Group 4 ===
Preliminaries
(Chinese Taipei) Yang Ching-shun	5
(Chinese Taipei) Lu Hui-chan	4
(Italy) Bruno Muratore	1
(Philippines) Antonio Gabica	9
(Malaysia) Ibrahim Bin Amir	8
(Philippines) Joven Bustamante	9
(Scotland) Jonni Fulcher	9
(Chile) Enrique Rojas	3
1st playoff round
(Chinese Taipei) Yang Ching-shun	9
(Italy) Bruno Muratore	6
(Malaysia) Ibrahim Bin Amir	9
(Chile) Enrique Rojas	9

Qualifiers
(Chinese Taipei) Lu Hui-chan	9
(Philippines) Antonio Gabica	3
(Philippines) Joven Bustamante	9
(Scotland) Jonni Fulcher	7
2nd playoff round
(Chinese Taipei) Yang Ching-shun	9
(Scotland) Jonni Fulcher	0
(Malaysia) Ibrahim Bin Amir	6
(Philippines) Antonio Gabica	9

=== Group 5 ===
Preliminaries
(Germany) Thorsten Hohmann	3
(Chinese Taipei) Ko Pin-yi	9
(Canada) Edwin Montal	3
(Belgium) Serge Das	9
(Philippines) Jeff De Luna	9
(Serbia) Sandor Tot	5
(Chinese Taipei) Fu Che-wei	9
(Italy) Vittorio De Falco	8
1st playoff round
(Germany) Thorsten Hohmann	9
(Canada) Edwin Montal	6
(Serbia) Sandor Tot	9
(Italy) Vittorio De Falco	7

Qualifiers
(Chinese Taipei) Ko Pin-yi	9
(Belgium) Serge Das	3
(Philippines) Jeff De Luna	9
(Chinese Taipei) Fu Che-wei	1
2nd playoff round
(Canada) Edwin Montal	1
(Chinese Taipei) Fu Che-wei	9
(Serbia) Sandor Tot	4
(Belgium) Serge Das	9

=== Group 6 ===
Preliminaries
(Philippines) Efren Reyes	2
(Japan) Kenichi Uchigaki	9
(Chinese Taipei) Liu Cheng-chuan	3
(Canada) Alain Martel	9
(United States) Tony Robles	0
(Poland) Tomasz Kapłan	9
(Malta) Tony Drago	9
(New Zealand) Ceri Worts	7
1st playoff round
(Philippines) Efren Reyes	9
(Chinese Taipei) Liu Cheng-chuan	6
(United States) Tony Robles	7
(New Zealand) Ceri Worts	9

Qualifiers
(Japan) Kenichi Uchigaki	9
(Canada) Alain Martel	3
(Poland) Tomasz Kapłan	4
(Malta) Tony Drago	9
2nd playoff round
(Philippines) Efren Reyes	9
(Poland) Tomasz Kapłan	4
(New Zealand) Ceri Worts	6
(Canada) Alain Martel	9

=== Group 7 ===
Preliminaries
(Chinese Taipei) Chang Jung-ling	9
(Indonesia) Alwi	6
(Singapore) Chan Keng Kwang	4
(Philippines) Ramil Gallego	9
(Netherlands) Nick van den Berg	9
(Canada) John Morra	7
(China) Dang Jinhu	9
(Japan) Kazuo Furuta	3
1st playoff round
(Indonesia) Alwi	5
(Singapore) Chan Keng Kwang	9
(Canada) John Morra	2
(Japan) Kazuo Furuta	9

Qualifiers
(Chinese Taipei) Chang Jung-ling	1
(Philippines) Ramil Gallego	9
(Netherlands) Nick van den Berg	9
(China) Dang Jinhu	3
2nd playoff round
(Singapore) Chan Keng Kwang	9
(China) Dang Jinhu	4
(Japan) Kazuo Furuta	6
(Chinese Taipei) Chang Jung-ling	9

=== Group 8 ===
Preliminaries
(Philippines) Alex Pagulayan	9
(Eritrea) Hamza Mohammed Saeed Ali	0
(Austria) Martin Kempter	9
(United States) Robb Saez	1
(Indonesia) Muhammad Zulfikri	9
(Croatia) Philipp Stojanovic	5
(Spain) David Alcaide	9
(Scotland) Stephen Capaldi	0
1st playoff round
(Eritrea) Hamza Mohammed Saeed Ali	4
(United States) Robb Saez	9
(Croatia) Philipp Stojanovic	9
(Scotland) Stephen Capaldi	3

Qualifiers
(Philippines) Alex Pagulayan	9
(Austria) Martin Kempter	6
(Indonesia) Muhammad Zulfikri	9
(Spain) David Alcaide	1
2nd playoff round
(United States) Robb Saez	9
(Spain) David Alcaide	4
(Croatia) Philipp Stojanovic	6
(Austria) Martin Kempter	9

=== Group 9 ===
Preliminaries
(Philippines) Francisco Bustamante	9
(South Africa) Zbynek Vaic	4
(South Korea) Jeong Young-hwa	9
(Philippines) Antonio Lining	8
(Germany) Oliver Ortmann	9
(Vietnam) Pham Tuan Ngoc	1
(United States) Corey Deuel	9
(Republic of Ireland) John Wims	3
1st playoff round
(South Africa) Zbynek Vaic	4
(Philippines) Antonio Lining	9
(Vietnam) Pham Tuan Ngoc	9
(Republic of Ireland) John Wims	3

Qualifiers
(Philippines) Francisco Bustamante	9
(South Korea) Jeong Young-hwa	0
(Germany) Oliver Ortmann	9
(United States) Corey Deuel	6
2nd playoff round
(Philippines) Antonio Lining	7
(United States) Corey Deuel	9
(Vietnam) Pham Tuan Ngoc	9
(South Korea) Jeong Young-hwa	7

=== Group 10 ===
Preliminaries
(Germany) Thomas Engert	9
(Brunei) Al-Muhtadee Billah	2
(Czech Republic) Roman Hybler	9
(Hong Kong) Lee Chenman	7
(Chinese Taipei) Kuo Po-cheng	9
(Spain) David Alcoberro	3
(England) Imran Majid	5
(Australia) Louis Condo	9
1st playoff round
(Brunei) Al-Muhtadee Billah	4
(Hong Kong) Lee Chenman	9
(Spain) David Alcoberro	9
(England) Imran Majid	3

Qualifiers
(Germany) Thomas Engert	9
(Czech Republic) Roman Hybler	2
(Chinese Taipei) Kuo Po-cheng	4
(Australia) Louis Condo	9
2nd playoff round
(Hong Kong) Lee Chenman	3
(Chinese Taipei) Kuo Po-cheng	9
(England) Imran Majid	9
(Czech Republic) Roman Hybler	8

=== Group 11 ===
Preliminaries
(Russia) Konstantin Stepanov	9
(Chile) Alejandro Carvajal	4
(South Korea) Rye Seung-woo	9
(Denmark) Bahram Lotfy	4
(Switzerland) Kuo Marco Tschudi	9
(England) Kevin Uzzell	4
(United States) Rodney Morris	9
(Australia) David Reljic	0
1st playoff round
(Chile) Alejandro Carvajal	8
(Denmark) Bahram Lotfy	9
(England) Kevin Uzzell	8
(Australia) David Reljic	9

Qualifiers
(Russia) Konstantin Stepanov	9
(South Korea) Rye Seung-woo	2
(Switzerland) Marco Tschudi	9
(United States) Rodney Morris	5
2nd playoff round
(Denmark) Bahram Lotfy	9
(United States) Rodney Morris	4
(Australia) David Reljic	6
(South Korea) Rye Seung-woo	9

=== Group 12 ===
Preliminaries
(Finland) Mika Immonen	9
(Qatar) Fahad Mohammadi	3
(Canada) Tyler Edey	8
(United States) Jeremy Jones	9
(Chinese Taipei) Chang Pei-wei	6
(England) Karl Boyes	9
(Philippines) Lee Vann Corteza	7
(Serbia) Goran Mladenovic	9
1st playoff round
(Qatar) Fahad Mohammadi	0
(Canada) Tyler Edey	9
(Chinese Taipei) Chang Pei-wei	4
(Philippines) Lee Vann Corteza	9

Qualifiers
(Finland) Mika Immonen	9
(United States) Jeremy Jones	6
(England) Karl Boyes	9
(Serbia) Goran Mladenovic	4
2nd playoff round
(Canada) Tyler Edey	7
(Serbia) Goran Mladenovic	9
(Philippines) Lee Vann Corteza	9
(United States) Jeremy Jones	4

== Knockout stages ==
=== Section 1 ===
Last 64; Race to 10; Nov 7
1	(Philippines) Alcano	6
17	(England) Peach	10
(Chinese Taipei) Lee	10
(England) Hundal	6
(Slovenia) Erculj	3
(Germany) Stolka	10
(Philippines) Andam	5
(Chinese Taipei) Wu Y-L	10
9	(Philippines) F Bustamante	10
25	(Spain) Alcaide	1
(Netherlands) van den Berg	10
23	(England) Majid	4
8	(Philippines) Pagulayan	10
(Vietnam) Pham	6
(Australia) Condo	10
(Singapore) Kwang	2

Last 32; Race to 10; Nov 8
17	(England) Peach	10
(Chinese Taipei) Lee	7
(Germany) Stolka	10
(Chinese Taipei) Wu Y-L	2
9	(Philippines) F Bustamante	10
(Netherlands) van den Berg	8
8	(Philippines) Pagulayan	10
(Australia) Condo	2

Last 16; Race to 11; Nov 9
17	(England) Peach	11
(Germany) Stolka	5
9	(Philippines) F Bustamante	11
8	(Philippines) Pagulayan	2

Quarterfinals; Race to 11; Nov 10
17	(England) Peach	11
9	(Philippines) F Bustamante	10

=== Section 2 ===
Last 64; Race to 10; Nov 7
(Chinese Taipei) Ko	8
(Serbia) Mladenovic	10
(Switzerland) Tschudi	4
(Canada) Martel	10
12	(Finland) Immonen	10
28	(Chinese Taipei) Fu	5
27	(Malta) Drago	10
(Denmark) Lofty	7
13	(United States) Van Boening	10
(Philippines) Gabica	7
(Hungary) Földes	10
(Serbia) Dabovic	2
(Chinese Taipei) Lu	10
(Sweden) Chamat	6
(Philippines) Manalo	1
(Poland) Babica	10

Last 32; Race to 10; Nov 8
(Serbia) Mladenovic	2
(Canada) Martel	10
12	(Finland) Immonen	10
27	(Malta) Drago	6
13	(United States) Van Boening	8
(Hungary) Földes	10
(Chinese Taipei) Lu	10
(Poland) Babica	3

Last 16; Race to 11; Nov 9
(Canada) Martel	8
12	(Finland) Immonen	11
(Hungary) Földes	11
(Chinese Taipei) Lu	5

Quarterfinals; Race to 11; Nov 10
12	(Finland) Immonen	7
(Hungary) Földes	11

=== Section 3 ===
Last 64; Race to 10; Nov 7
30	(Vietnam) Luong	10
(United States) Strickland	8
(Japan) Kawabata	10
4	(Chinese Taipei) Yang	3
19	(Italy) Petroni	9
3	(Chinese Taipei) Wu C-C	10
(Philippines) J Bustamante	10
(Philippines) Orcollo	6
11	(Russia) Stepanov	10
6	(Philippines) Reyes	5
(Philippines) de Luna	10
21	(Philippines) Corteza	7
(Japan) Uchigaki	7
(South Korea) Rye	10
(England) Boyes	10
(Serbia) Tot	6

Last 32; Race to 10; Nov 8
30	(Vietnam) Luong	3
(Japan) Kawabata	10
3	(Chinese Taipei) Wu C-C	8
(Philippines) J Bustamante	10
11	(Russia) Stepanov	10
(Philippines) de Luna	4
(South Korea) Rye	8
(England) Boyes	10

Last 16; Race to 11; Nov 9
(Japan) Kawabata	9
(Philippines) J Bustamante	11
11	(Russia) Stepanov	4
(England) Boyes	11

Quarterfinals; Race to 11; Nov 10
(Philippines) J Bustamante	8
(England) Boyes	11

=== Section 4 ===
Last 64; Race to 10; Nov 7
(Philippines) Gallego	5
(Chinese Taipei) Kuo	10
(Germany) Ortmann	10
(Croatia) Stojanovic	7
10	(Germany) Engert	7
7	(Chinese Taipei) Chang	10
(Indonesia) Zulfikri	4
24	(United States) Deuel	10
(Japan) Oi	8
2	(Germany) Souquet	10
(United States) Williams	7
16	(Netherlands) Feijen	10
(Australia) Delahunty	0
18	(Chinese Taipei) Chao	10
(Philippines) Gomez	10
(Netherlands) Lely	1

Last 32; Race to 10; Nov 8
(Chinese Taipei) Kuo	10
(Germany) Ortmann	7
7	(Chinese Taipei) Chang	9
24	(United States) Deuel	10
2	(Germany) Souquet	2
16	(Netherlands) Feijen	10
18	(Chinese Taipei) Chao	2
(Philippines) Gomez	10

Last 16; Race to 11; Nov 9
(Chinese Taipei) Kuo	11
24	(United States) Deuel	7
16	(Netherlands) Feijen	0
(Philippines) Gomez	11

Quarterfinals; Race to 11; Nov 10
(Chinese Taipei) Kuo	4
(Philippines) Gomez	11

=== Semifinals and final ===
Semi-finals; Race to 11; Nov 10
17	(England) Peach	11
(Hungary) Földes	2
(England) Boyes	4
(Philippines) Gomez	11

Final; Race to 17; Nov 11
17	(England) Peach	17
(Philippines) Gomez	15

=== Country representation ===
Country	Last 64	Last 32	Last 16	Quarterfinals	Semifinals	Final
England	4	2	2	2	2	1
Philippines	13	5	4	3	1	1
Hungary	1	1	1	1	1	-
Chinese Taipei	10	7	2	1	-	-
Finland	1	1	1	1	-	-
Germany	4	3	1	-	-	-
United States	4	2	1	-	-	-
Netherlands	3	2	1	-	-	-
Japan	3	1	1	-	-	-
Canada	1	1	1	-	-	-
Russia	1	1	1	-	-	-
Serbia	3	1	-	-	-	-
Australia	2	1	-	-	-	-
Vietnam	2	1	-	-	-	-
Malta	1	1	-	-	-	-
Poland	1	1	-	-	-	-
South Korea	1	1	-	-	-	-
Other countries	9	-	-	-	-	-

== Final ==
November 11	Daryl Peach (England)	17–15	(Philippines) Roberto Gomez	Araneta Coliseum, Quezon City; Referee: Michaela Tabb
