= 2008 WPA World Ten-ball Championship =

2008 world pool championship

2011 WPA World Ten-ball Championship
Tournament information
- Sport: Ten-Ball
- Location: Pasay, Metro Manila, Philippines
- Dates: September 29–October 5, 2008
- Tournament format: Double Elimination / Single Elimination
- Host: WPA World Ten-ball Championship
- Venue: Philippine International Convention Center
- Participants: 128

Final positions
- Champion: (England) Darren Appleton
- Runner-up: (Chinese Taipei) Wu Jia-qing

The WPA 10-Ball World Championship 2008 was a ten-ball pool tournament held from September 29 to October 5, 2008, at the Philippine International Convention Center in Pasay, Metro Manila, Philippines. The first edition of the WPA World Ten-ball Championship, it featured a field of 128 players competing in a double-elimination and then single-elimination tournament. The total prize fund for the event was $400,000 with $100,000 being awarded to the winner.

The event was won by England's Darren Appleton, winning his first world championship, defeating nineteen year old Taiwanese player Wu Jia-qing in the final 13–11. The event was boycotted by many top Filipino players, such as Efren Reyes, due to an issue with sponsors Raya Sports.

== Format ==
The 128 participating players were divided into 16 groups, in which they competed in a double elimination tournament against each other. The remaining 64 players in each group qualified for the final round played in the knockout system. The event was played under the alternating break format.

=== Prize money ===
Below was the advertised prize fund for the event. The event saw the largest amount of prize money for the event, with $400,000 being paid, and the winner's share of $100,000 won by Darren Appleton. The event was boycotted by some players due to not receiving payment from organiser's Raya sports. The event's prize money payments were delayed, with winner Appleton not receiving payment for over a month after the event. All prize money was eventually paid to players, including Appleton.

Position	Prize
First place (champion)	$100,000
Second place (runner-up)	$40,000
Third place	$25,000
Fourth place	$15,000
Fifth place (quarter-finalist)	$10,000
Ninth place (loser in round of 16)	$4,500
17th place (loser in round of 32)	$3,000
33rd place (loser in round of 64)	$2,000
65th place (loser in preliminary)	$1,000

== Tournament summary ==
Other results: 5th through 8th: Nick van den Berg, Charlie Williams, Liu Haitao, Mika Immonen; 9th through 16th: Shane Van Boening, Mark Gray, Ralf Souquet, Yang Ching-shun, Jerico Banares, Marlon Manalo, Fu Che-wei, and Satoshi Kawabata.

Nineteen-year-old Wu Jia-qing defeated Filipino Demosthenes Pulpul 11–8 in the semi-finals, October 4. Using a borrowed cue stick, Wu reached the title match of the event. Pulpul, meanwhile, would go on to compete against Niels "the Terminator" Feijen of the Netherlands for 3rd place (see below for details). Earlier, Pulpul had defeated Liu Haitao (11–8) of China in the quarter-finals, while Feijen lost to Darren Appleton of England, 9–11.

Appleton squared off with Wu for the $100,000 (₱4,715,000 or UK£56,000) 1st prize on October 5, and claimed an upset victory over Wu, 13–11. He said of his win: "I've waited 16 years for this and have to enjoy the moment. I had mixed feelings and I was looking back at my disappointments in the past. I was ranked first in the world [earlier in the decade] but I have never won a world championship. I saved my best game for the finals. I really wanted to dictate the tempo of the game, but the breaks just didn’t go my way. It was a good game. I played well this time. He was a tough player but I made fewer mistakes than him. It was a dream come true for me and I'm happy to win the title here in the Philippines. I would love to be back here."

Appleton was also quoted as saying: "Pool is an easy choice for me as a sport as I have to choose among boxing, football and pool among others. But this victory is sweeter for me and I have to dedicate this to my parents, whose relationship is in the rocks. With the $100,000 grand prize, first, I have to give some to my parents, because we had a difficult way of living."

Wu, nicknamed Taisun ("Little Genius") settled for the runner-up prize of $40,000, and remarked, "I didn't have a good break in the last game and that was crucial to me." In the third-place battle, Feijen defeated Pulpul, 11–8, and received $25,000 (₱1,178,000) to Pulpul's $15,000.

WPA president Ian Anderson announced: "This early, there's a strong clamor for the WTBC and it will definitely be back next year in Manila. It will be staged October of next year and there's also the Philippine Open to be held June 2009. I think Manila is the best place to go in hosting pool and it is living up to its billing as the pool Mecca in Asia."

== Knockout round ==
Below is the results from the knockout round. Players in bold denote match winners.

Round of 64

2 October 2008

Round of 32

3 October 2008

Round of 16

4 October 2008

Quarter-finals

October 4, 2008

Semi-finals

October 5, 2008

Final

5. October 2008

Shane Van Boening (USA)
9

Tony Drago (MLT)
3

(United States) S. Van Boening
9

(United States) Shaun Wilkie
5

Naoyuki Ōi (JPN)
7

(United States) Shaun Wilkie
9

(United States) S. Van Boening
3

(Chinese Taipei) Wu Jia-qing
9

(Italy) Bruno Muratore
9

(India) D. Sing Lilly
6

(Italy) Bruno Mutadore
6

(Chinese Taipei) Wu Jia-qing
9

Wu Jia-qing (TPE)
9

(United States) Stevie Moore
4

(Chinese Taipei) Wu Jia-qing
11

Mika Immonen (FIN)
7

Daryl Peach (ENG)
9

(Philippines) Arnell Bautista
4

Daryl Peach (ENG)
6

Mark Gray (ENG)
9

Mark Gray (ENG)
9

Corey Deuel (USA)
6

Mark Gray (ENG)
4

Mika Immonen (FIN)
9

Ko Pin-yi (TPE)
9

Ruslan Chinakhov (RUS)
2

Ko Pin-yi (TPE)
6

Mika Immonen (FIN)
9

Mika Immonen (FIN)
9

Jonni Fulcher (SCO)
5

(Chinese Taipei) Wu Jia-qing
11

(Philippines) D. Pulpul
8

(Switzerland) Dimitri Jungo
8

Liu Haitao (CHN)
9

(China) Liu Haitao
9

Tyler Edey (CAN)
6

Tyler Edey (CAN)
9

Liu Shin-mei (TPE)
3

Liu Haitao (CHN)
9

Ralf Souquet (DEU)
8

Vilmos Földes (HUN)
9

(Spain) Carlos Cabello
6

Vilmos Földes (HUN)
4

Ralf Souquet (DEU)
9

Ralf Souquet (DEU)
9

Imran Majid (ENG)
5

(China) Liu Haitao
8

(Philippines) D. Pulpul
11

Oliver Ortmann (DEU)
6

(Japan) Kazuo Furuta
9

(Japan) Kazuo Furuta
4

(Philippines) D. Pulpul
9

(Philippines) D. Pulpul
9

Jasmin Ouschan (AUT)
8

(Philippines) D. Pulpul
9

Yang Ching-shun (TPE)
8

(Philippines) Leonardo Didal
9

(China) Zhang Shuchun
5

(Philippines) Leonardo Didal
8

Yang Ching-shun (TPE)
9

(Chinese Taipei) Hung-Ming Chu
4

Yang Ching-shun (TPE)
9

Wu Jia-qing (TPE)
11

Darren Appleton (ENG)
13

(Germany) Sascha Tege
5

(Japan) S. Kawabata
9

(Japan) S. Kawabata
9

(Japan) Hayato Hijikata
7

Roman Hybler (CZE)
7

(Japan) Hayato Hijikata
9

(Japan) S. Kawabata
8

Darren Appleton (ENG)
9

Darren Appleton (ENG)
9

(Chinese Taipei) Lai Chia-Hsiung
8

Darren Appleton (ENG)
9

Ryu Seung-woo (KOR)
2

Ryu Seung-woo (KOR)
9

(South Korea) Jeong Young-hwa
7

Darren Appleton (ENG)
11

Charlie Williams (USA)
6

Sandor Tot (SRB)
8

Jeff de Luna (PHL)
9

Jeff de Luna (PHL)
1

Fu Che-wei (TPE)
9

Fu Che-wei (TPE)
9

(South Korea) King Woong-Dae
6

Fu Che-wei (TPE)
5

C. Williams (USA)
9

(Chinese Taipei) Hui-Chan Lu
7

Chang Jung-lin (TPE)
9

Chang Jung-lin (TPE)
8

C. Williams (USA)
9

C. Williams (USA)
9

Ernesto Domínguez (MEX)
2

Darren Appleton (ENG)
11

Niels Feijen (NLD)
9

Marlon Manalo (PHL)
9

Fabio Petroni (ITA)
5

Marlon Manalo (PHL)
9

(Philippines) Victor Arpilleda
2

(Philippines) Victor Arpilleda
9

(China) Wang Ming
4

Marlon Manalo (PHL)
6

Niels Feijen (NLD)
9

Niels Feijen (NLD)
9

Ricky Yang (IDN)
4

Niels Feijen (NLD)
9

David Alcaide (ESP)
4

(Austria) Martin Kempter
4

David Alcaide (ESP)
9

Niels Feijen (NLD)
11

Nick van den Berg (NLD)
7

Marcus Chamat (SWE)
9

(Germany) Christian Weigoni
7

Marcus Chamat (SWE)
2

N. van den Berg (NLD)
9

N. van den Berg (NLD)
9

(Denmark) Martin Larsen
7

N. van den Berg (NLD)
9

(Philippines) Jerico Banares
6

(Australia) Louis Condo
8

(Indonesia) Dodong Alwi
9

(Indonesia) Dodong Alwi
4

(Philippines) Jerico Banares
9

(Chinese Taipei) Wang Hung-hsiang
8

(Philippines) Jerico Banares
9
