= 2009 WPA World Ten-ball Championship =

2009 world pool championship

2011 WPA World 10-Ball Championship
Tournament information
- Sport: Ten-Ball
- Location: Pasay, Metro Manila, Philippines
- Dates: November 25, 2009–November 30, 2009
- Tournament format: Round robin / Single Elimination
- Host: WPA World Ten-ball Championship
- Venue(s): Star Billiards Center, World Trade Center Metro Manila
- Participants: 128

Final positions
- Champion: (Finland) Mika Immonen
- Runner-up: (Philippines) Lee Vann Corteza

The WPA 10-Ball World Championship 2009 was the second edition of the WPA World 10-ball Championship, the world championship for the discipline of 10-ball pool. The event took place from November 25 to 30, 2009. The qualification phase was hosted at the Star Billiards Center, in Quezon City while the final tournament which started from May 10, 2011, was hosted at the World Trade Center Manila in Pasay.

The event was won by Finland's Mika Immonen, defeating Filipino Lee Vann Corteza in the final 11–6. British Darren Appleton was the defending champion, having won the 2008 event, but was defeated by David Alcaide in the quarter-finals.

== Format ==
The 128 participating players were divided into 16 groups, in which they competed in a double elimination tournament against each other. The remaining 64 players in each group qualified for the final round played in the knockout system.

=== Prize money ===
Below was the advertised prize fund for the event.

| Position | Prize |
|---|---|
| First place (champion) | $60,000 |
| Second place (runner-up) | $30,000 |
| Third place (semi-finalist) | $15,000 |
| Fifth place (quarter-finalist) | $7,500 |
| Ninth place (loser in round of 16) | $3,500 |
| 17th place (loser in round of 32) | $2,500 |
| 33rd place (loser in round of 64) | $1,000 |

== Knockout round ==
Round of 64; 28 Nov 2008
(Philippines) Warren Kiamco | 9
(Venezuela) Jalal Yousef | 8
(Philippines) Jericho Banares | 1
(Germany) T. Hohmann | 9
(Austria) Mario He | 4
(England) Daryl Peach | 9
(Poland) Radosław Babica | 6
(Japan) Satoshi Kawabata | 9
(Philippines) Antonio Lining | 9
(United States) Corey Deuel | 4
(Canada) Adam Smith | 4
(Japan) Naoyuki Ōi | 9
(South Korea) Jeong Young-hwa | 6
(Philippines) Jomar De Ocampo | 9
(Vietnam) Nguyen Anh Tuan | 9
(England) Karl Boyes | 8
(Netherlands) Niels Feijen | 6
(Finland) Mika Immonen | 9
(Philippines) Marlon Manalo | 9
(China) Fu Jianbo | 4
(Mexico) Ernesto Domínguez | 6
(Netherlands) Nick van den Berg | 9
(Scotland) Jonni Fulcher | 9
(Hong Kong) Kenny Kwok | 8
(Canada) Alain Martel | 8
(Philippines) Jundel Mazon | 9
(Netherlands) Huidji See | 6
(Russia) Ruslan Tschinachow | 9
(Finland) Markus Juva | 5
(Philippines) Elvis Calasang | 9
(United States) Johnny Archer | 2
(Indonesia) Dodong Alwi | 9
(Philippines) Lee Vann Corteza | 9
(Russia) Konstantin Stepanow | 7
(Australia) Ben Nunan | 4
(Chinese Taipei) Chang Yu-Lung | 9
(England) Imran Majid | 9
(Philippines) Ronato Alcano | 5
(Germany) Thomas Engert | 9
(United States) Charlie Williams | 3
(Chinese Taipei) Fu Che-wei | 6
(Czech Republic) Roman Hybler | 9
(Indonesia) Ricky Yang | 5
(China) Wang Ming | 9
(China) Li Hewen | 9
(Germany) Oliver Ortmann | 5
(Germany) Ralf Souquet | 9
(Mexico) Ignacio Chávez | 8
(England) Darren Appleton | 9
(England) Craig Osborne | 3
(Germany) Christoph Reintjes | 5
(France) Stephan Cohen | 9
(China) Dang Jinhu | 9
(Chinese Taipei) Yang Ching-shun | 6
(Sweden) Marcus Chamat | 9
(Chinese Taipei) Kuo Po-cheng | 7
(Japan) Hayato Hijikata | 9
(Canada) Erik Hjorleifson | 2
(United States) Óscar Domínguez | 2
(Philippines) Dennis Orcollo | 9
(Japan) Yukio Akakariyama | 6
(Chinese Taipei) Chao Fong-Pang | 9
(Spain) David Alcaide | 9
(Philippines) Antonio Gabica | 8

Round of 32; 29 Nov 2008
(Philippines) Warren Kiamco | 9
(Germany) Thorsten Hohmann | 5
(England) Daryl Peach | 9
(Japan) Satoshi Kawabata | 7
(Philippines) Antonio Lining | 9
(Japan) Naoyuki Oi | 7
(Philippines) Jomar De Ocampo | 9
(Vietnam) Nguyen Anh Tuan | 5
(Finland) Mika Immonen | 9
(Philippines) Marlon Manalo | 6
(Netherlands) Nick van den Berg | 9
(Scotland) Jonni Fulcher | 4
(Philippines) Jundel Mazon | 3
(Russia) Ruslan Tschinachow | 9
(Philippines) Elvis Calasang | 9
(Indonesia) Dodong Alwi | 7
(Philippines) Lee Vann Corteza | 9
(Chinese Taipei) Chang Yu-Lung | 8
(England) Imran Majid | 3
(Germany) Thomas Engert | 9
(Czech Republic) Roman Hybler | 6
(China) Wang Ming | 9
(China) Li Hewen | 9
(Germany) Ralf Souquet | 6
(England) Darren Appleton | 9
(France) Stephan Cohen | 5
(China) Dang Jinhu | 7
(Sweden) Marcus Chamat | 9
(Japan) Hayato Hijikata | 7
(Philippines) Dennis Orcollo | 9
(Chinese Taipei) Chao Fong-Pang | 5
(Spain) David Alcaide | 9

Round of 16; 29 Nov 2008
(Philippines) Warren Kiamco | 9
(England) Daryl Peach | 7
(Philippines) Antonio Lining | 9
(Philippines) Jomar De Ocampo | 2
(Finland) Mika Immonen | 9
(Netherlands) Nick van den Berg | 7
(Russia) Ruslan Tschinachow | 9
(Philippines) Elvis Calasang | 6
(Philippines) Lee Vann Corteza | 9
(Germany) Thomas Engert | 7
(China) Wang Ming | 8
(China) Li Hewen | 9
(England) Darren Appleton | 9
(Sweden) Marcus Chamat | 7
(Philippines) Dennis Orcollo | 6
(Spain) David Alcaide | 9

Quarter final 29 Nov 2008
(Philippines) Warren Kiamco | 8
(Philippines) Antonio Lining | 9
(Finland) Mika Immonen | 9
(Russia) Ruslan Tschinachow | 6
(Philippines) Lee Vann Corteza | 9
(China) Li Hewen | 7
(England) Darren Appleton | 6
(Spain) David Alcaide | 9

Semi final 30 Nov 2008
(Philippines) Antonio Lining | 7
(Finland) Mika Immonen | 9
(Philippines) Lee Vann Corteza | 9
(Spain) David Alcaide | 7

Final; 30 Nov 2008
(Finland) Mika Immonen | 11
(Philippines) Lee Vann Corteza | 6
