= 2010 World Team Championship =

Championship

The 2010 World Team Championship (short WTC 2010) was the first edition of the World Team Championship which was sanctioned by the World Pool-Billiard Association, which ran from January 30, 2010, to February 6, 2010, in Hanover, Germany. A total prize fund of $398,000 was distributed, with the winning team receiving $100,000. The Great Britain 1 team of Darren Appleton, Daryl Peach, Imran Majid, Karl Boyes and Mark Gray won the event with a 4–1 victory over the Philippines. It was the first iteration of the World Team Championship.

In the quarter-finals, the match between Britain 1 and China reached a score of 27–25 despite being a race to 6 racks as the team needed to win by two racks.

== Format ==
The World Team Championship consisteted of teams of 4-6 players for national teams. The event was organised and run by the World Pool-Billiard Association. Only one national team is allowed to compete per nation, with the exception of hosts Germany, Great Britain and Israel. The latter two were re-nominated after the teams from Nigeria and Brunei cancelled.

The event featured three pool disciplines for each match: Eight-ball, Nine-ball and 10-Ball. Each match consists of six matches; two each in the respective disciplines. The 8-ball sets are played in doubles to 6 racks. The 9-ball and 10-ball sets are played in singles on a playout of 8 or 7 racks. If a match is tied 3-3, the winner is determined by a playoff.

The tournament was contested as a Double-elimination tournament until 16 teams remained. In the final round of the last 16 will be in the Single-elimination tournament played, so every defeat leads to the immediate withdrawal from the tournament.

=== Prize money ===
The event featured a prize fund totalling $398,000, with $100,000 for the winners of the event split between the participants. A breakdown of the prize money is shown below:

Placing	Prize money
Winner	$100,000
Runner-up	$50,000
Semi-finalists	$30,000
Quarter-finalists	$15,000
Last 16	$10,000
17-24 Place	$6,000

== Competing teams ==
Nation	Player 1	Player 2	Player 3	Player 4	(Player 5)	(Player 6)
Aruba	Richard Wolff	Aaron Franken	Ryan Rampersaud	Ditto Acosta	×	×
Belgium	Serge Das	Noel Bruynooghe	Pascal Budo	Jan Dulst	×	×
China	Li Hewen	Fu Jianbo	Liu Haitao	Dang Jinhu	×	×
Denmark	Kasper Thygesen	Kasper Kristoffersen	Bahram Lotfy	Martin Larsen	×	×
Germany I	Ralf Souquet	Andreas Roschkowsky	Thorsten Hohmann	Christian Reimering	Manuel Ederer	Nicolas Ottermann
Germany II	Oliver Ortmann	Dominic Jentsch	Thomas Lüttich	John Blacklaw	Christian Musmann	×
Estonia	Jüri Talu	Rainer Laar	Erki Erm	Denis Grabe	Reimo Simsalu	×
Finland	Mika Immonen	Markus Juva	Aki Heiskanen	Petri Makkonen	×	×
France	Stephan Cohen	Vincent Facquet	Lionel Vernedal	Laurant Bourdelles	×	×
Greece	Nikos Ekonomopoulos	John Vassalos	Alexander Kazakis	Evangelos Vettas	Aristeidis Damoylakis	Christos Kokotis
Iran	Takhti Zarakani	Farhad Shaverdi	Hadi Keyvan Ekbatani	Ali Khojasteh Anbaran	×	×
Israel I	Noam Cohen	Dror Dobronski	Ben Gmach	Zion Zvi	×	×
Israel II	Shai Eisenberg	Sagi Kortler	Valery Kostovesky	Dobronsky Osnat	×	×
Italy	Bruno Muratore	Pietro Caperna	Gabriele Cimmino	Vittorio De Falco	Michele Monaco	Mauro Castriota
Japan	Satoshi Kawabata	Yukio Akakariyama	Masaaki Tanaka	Naoyuki Ōi	×	×
Canada	Alain Martel	Tyler Edey	Jason Klatt	Ron Wiseman	Erik Hjorleifson	×
Croatia	Ivica Putnik	Robert Sudić	Božo Primić	Karlo Dalmatin	Tomislav Šušić	×
Kuwait	Khaled al-Mutairi	Abdullah al-Yasef	Majed al-Azemi	Bader al-Awadhi	Tareq al-Mulla	Omar al-Shaheen
Liechtenstein	Alessandro Banzer	Branko Kosic	Hans Jörg Dutler	Mario Wille	×	×
Morocco	Amine Ouahbi	Samuel Saïd Arji	Yousri Kabbaj	Ameur Abdel Ati Riad	Mounir Al Honsali	×
Netherlands	Niels Feijen	Nick van den Berg	Huidji See	Alex Lely	×	×
Nigeria	Samuel Bamgbose	Shehu Bamidele	Adegbite Aderibigbe	Ayodele Ajibodu	Marins Abada	×
Northern Cyprus	Ali Karanfiloglu	Huseyin Borankan	Onuc Altur	Berk Mehmetcik	×	×
Norway	Vegar Kristiansen	Ronny Oldervik	Mats Schjetne	Malvin Boelland	×	×
Peru	Christopher Tevez Ocampo	Juan Vega Enriquez	Jorge Llanos Bustillos	Jhon Lopez Roman	Luis Arias Chosek	Edson Damian Velasquez
Philippines	Ronato Alcano	Lee Vann Corteza	Warren Kiamco	Antonio Lining	Marlon Manalo	Dennis Orcollo
Poland	Radosław Babica	Tomasz Kapłan	Mateusz Śniegocki	Karol Skowerski	Adam Skoneczny	Mariusz Skoneczny
Austria	Jasmin Ouschan	Albin Ouschan	Maximilian Lechner	Jürgen Jenisy	Martin Kempter	Mario He
Russia	Konstantin Stepanov	Ruslan Chinakhov	Jegor Plischkin	Roman Pruchay	×	×
Sweden	Marcus Chamat	Tomas Larsson	Jim Chawki	Andreas Gerwen	Jan Lundell	×
Switzerland	Dimitri Jungo	Sascha Specchia	Ronny Regli	Marco Tschudi	×	×
Serbia	Šandor Tot	Zoran Svilar	Andreja Klasović	Goran Mladenović	Miloš Verkić	×
Slovakia	Jaroslav Polach	Milan Klobucnik	Zoltan Petrovic	Peter Leitman	Jakub Koniar	Rene Daubner
Slovenia	Jožko Marinko	Matjaž Demšar	Rado Doroslovac	Mates Cretnik	×	×
Spain	David Alcaide	Francisco Sánchez Ruiz	Jose L. Gonzales	Rafael Guzman	×	×
South Korea	Jeong Young-hwa	Park K. Chan	Lee Gun Jea	Han Won Sik	×	×
Hungary	Vilmos Földes	Mate Hazay	Attila Bezdan	Csaba Nagy	Bence Varga	Gabor Antal
Czech Republic	Roman Hybler	Michal Gavenčiak	Lukas Krenek	Adam Houdek	Oto Zeman	×
United States	Johnny Archer	Shane Van Boening	Óscar Domínguez	Corey Deuel	×	×
United Arab Emirates	Muhammed Al Hosani	Hanni Al Howri	Mohammed Obaid	Khalid Sibaitah	×	×
United Kingdom I	Darren Appleton	Imran Majid	Karl Boyes	Daryl Peach	Mark Gray	×
United Kingdom II	Chris Melling	Craig Osborne	Adam Smith	Mick Hill	Michael Valentine	×
Cyprus	Costas Konnaris	Prodromos Demosthenous	Yiannos Kitromilidies	Panicos Petrou	George Louka	×

== Results ==
=== Round of 16 ===
After the double elimination round, a single elimination tournament featuring the last 16 teams was held. Below are the results from this stage:

Team	8-Ball		9-Ball		10-Ball		
4 February 2010	I	II	III	IV	V	VI	Score
Philippines	6	6	8	7	4	7	4
Norway	5	3	2	8	7	1	2
4. February 2010	I	II	III	IV	V	VI	Score
Poland	6	6	8	8	×	×	4
Finland	3	4	2	4	×	×	0
4 February 2010	I	II	III	IV	V	VI	Score
Russia	6	4	8	2	7	7	4
Denmark	4	6	6	8	2	2	2
4 February 2010	I	II	III	IV	V	VI	Score
Sweden	6	5	5	8	7	6	3
Germany 2	1	6	8	6	5	7	3

Team	8-Ball		9-Ball		10-Ball		
4 February 2010	I	II	III	IV	V	VI	Score
Germany 1	5	2	4	6	×	×	0
United Kingdom 1	6	6	8	8	×	×	4
4 February 2010	I	II	III	IV	V	VI	Score
China	5	6	8	8	7	×	4
Serbia	6	3	4	6	5	×	1
4 February 2010	I	II	III	IV	V	VI	Score
Switzerland	6	6	2	8	7	×	4
Japan	5	5	8	2	6	×	1
4 February 2010	I	II	III	IV	V	VI	Score
United States	6	4	6	7	7	7	3
Greece	5	6	8	8	6	5	3

=== Quarter-finals ===
Team	8-Ball		9-Ball		10-Ball		
5 February 2010	I	II	III	IV	V	VI	Score
Philippines	6	6	8	4	5	7	4
Poland	4	3	3	8	7	3	2
5 February 2010	I	II	III	IV	V	VI	Score
Russia	6	6	6	6	7	7	5
Germany 2	3	5	8	4	5	2	1

Team	8-Ball		9-Ball		10-Ball		
5 February 2010	I	II	III	IV	V	VI	Score
United Kingdom 1	6	4	4	5	7	7	3 (Note: Britain won on a tie-breaker match 27-25.)
China	1	6	8	8	3	6	3
5 February 2010	I	II	III	IV	V	VI	Score
Switzerland	1	1	4	7	×	×	0
Greece	6	6	8	8	×	×	4

=== Semi-finals ===
Team	8-Ball		9-Ball		10-Ball		
6 February 2010	I	II	III	IV	V	VI	Score
Philippines	3	6	8	8	7	×	4
Russia	6	4	4	4	1	×	1

Team	8-Ball		9-Ball		10-Ball		
6 February 2010	I	II	III	IV	V	VI	Score
United Kingdom 1	6	4	8	8	4	7	4
Greece	4	6	4	6	7	4	2

=== Final ===
Team	8-Ball		9-Ball		10-Ball		
7 February 2010	I	II	III	IV	V	VI	Score
Philippines	6	1	2	7	1	×	1
United Kingdom 1	1	6	8	8	7	×	4
