= 2008 World Cup of Pool =

Tournament information
- Dates: 7–11 October 2008
- City: Rotterdam
- Country: Netherlands
- Organisation: Matchroom Sport
- Format: Single-elimination tournament
- Total prize fund: $250,000
- Winner's share: $30,000 per player

Final
- Champion: United States (Rodney Morris and Shane Van Boening)
- Runner-up: England (Daryl Peach and Mark Gray)
- Score: 11–7

The 2008 World Cup of Pool (officially the 2008 PartyPoker.net World Cup of Pool) was a professional nine-ball pool tournament. It was the third edition of the World Cup of Pool, a pairs tournament for players representing national teams. The event was held again in Rotterdam in the Netherlands, from October 7–11, 2008 and organised by Matchroom Sport. There were 32 teams competing in a single-elimination tournament. The winners received $30,000 each from a total prize fund of $250,000.

The defending champions were Li Hewen and Fu Jianbo representing China, who had won the previous year's event with a 11–10 victory over Mika Immonen and Markus Juva of Finland in the final. The Chinese pair were knocked out in the semi-finals by the English team. The United States team of Rodney Morris and Shane Van Boening defeated the England team of Mark Gray and Daryl Peach 11‍–‍7 in the final to win the event.

== Format ==
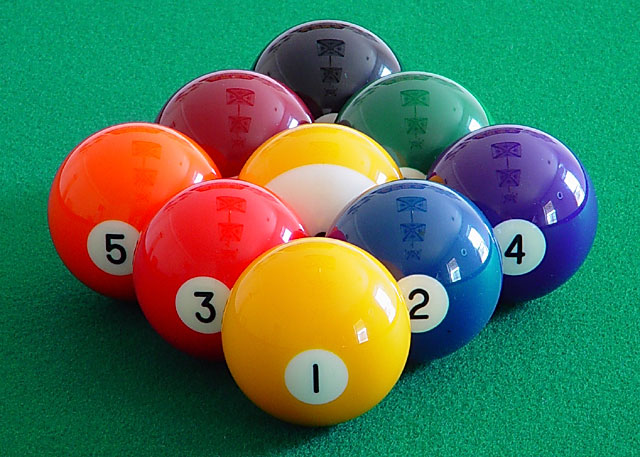
nine-ball rack

The 2008 World Cup of Pool (officially the 2008 PartyPoker.net World Cup of Pool) was a pairs nine-ball tournament held at the Outland nightclub in Rotterdam, Netherlands. The tournament was played between 7 and 12 October 2008 as scotch doubles, with players taking shots alternately. The tournament featured a single-elimination bracket consisting of 32 teams representing nations.

Matches in the opening two rounds were played as a race-to-eight racks, the quarter-finals and semi-finals as a race-to-nine, and the final as a race-to-11 racks. Players were allowed 40 seconds per shot, and the event used the winner breaks system. It was the third World Cup of Pool event, sponsored by Partypoker and hosted by Matchroom Sport. The defending champions were Li Hewen and Fu Jianbo representing China, who had won the previous year's event with a 11–10 victory over Mika Immonen and Markus Juva of Finland in the final. The 32 sides were split into two, 16 seeded, 16 unseeded.

=== Broadcasting ===
The event was broadcast worldwide, split into 31 one-hour episodes. Commentary in English was by Phil Yates and Jim Wych. Below is a list of broadcasters by territory:

Region	Channel
Australia	Fox Sports
China	CCTV-5
Germany	DSF
Hong Kong	i-CABLE Sports
Iceland	Screen One
India	NEO Sports
Indonesia	MEASAT
Japan	J Sky Sports
Malaysia	MEASAT
Middle East	Ten Sports / Showtime
New Zealand	Sky Network
Philippines	Solar Entertainment
Romania	Telesport
Russia	Seven TV
Singapore	StarHub TV
Taiwan	Videoland
Ukraine	MMS
United Kingdom	BSkyB
United States	Fox

=== Prize fund ===
The total prize fund for the 2008 event was $250,000, consistent with the previous year's tournament. The winning team received $60,000, which was split between the two players. The breakdown of prize money is shown below:

Stage	Prize money (Total)
Winner	$60,000
Runner-up	$30,000
Semi-finalists	$16,000
Quarter-finalists	$10,000
Last 16	$5,000
Last 32	$3,000
Total	$250,000

=== Teams ===
The field consisted of 32 teams. As the host nation, the Netherlands were represented by two teams (Netherlands A and Netherlands B). The second Netherlands team (Roy Gerards and Gijs van Helmond) won an eight-team tournament to secure the position against other Dutch teams.

- Australia (Stuart Lawler and John Wims)
- Austria (Martin Kempter and Jasmin Ouschan)
- Belgium (Serge Das and Noel Bruynooghe)
- Canada (Edwin Montal and Tyler Edey)
- China (Fu Jianbo and Li Hewen)
- Croatia (Philipp Stojanovic and Ivica Putnik)
- Denmark (Kasper Kristoffersen and Martin Larsen)
- England (Daryl Peach and Mark Gray)
- Finland (Mika Immonen and Markus Juva)
- France (Stephan Cohen and Vincent Facquet)
- Germany (Thomas Engert and Ralf Souquet)
- Hong Kong (Kenny Kwok and Lee Chenman)
- Iceland (Bjorgvin Hallgrimsson and Kristján Helgason)
- India (Alok Kumar and Sumit Talwar)
- Italy (Fabio Petroni and Bruno Muratore)
- Japan (Naoyuki Ōi and Satoshi Kawabata)
- Korea (Kim Woong-dae and Jeong Young-hwa)
- Malaysia (Ibrahim Bin Amir and Lee Poh Soon)
- Malta (Tony Drago and Alex Borg)
- Netherlands A (Niels Feijen and Nick van den Berg)
- Netherlands B (Roy Gerards and Gijs van Helmond)
- Peru (Jhon Lopez and Juan Vega)
- Philippines (Francisco Bustamante and Dennis Orcollo)
- Poland (Radosław Babica and Mateusz Śniegocki)
- Qatar (Bashar Hussain and Fahad Ahmed Al Mohammadi)
- Russia (Konstantin Stepanov and Ruslan Chinakhov)
- Spain (David Alcaide and Carlos Cabello)
- Switzerland (Marco Tschudi and Dimitri Jungo)
- Chinese Taipei (Wu Jia-qing and Wang Hung-hsiang)
- Thailand (Dechawat Poomjaeng and Nitiwat Kanjanasri)
- United States (Rodney Morris and Shane Van Boening)
- Vietnam (Lương Chí Dũng and Thanh Nam Nguyen)

== Tournament summary ==
=== Early rounds ===
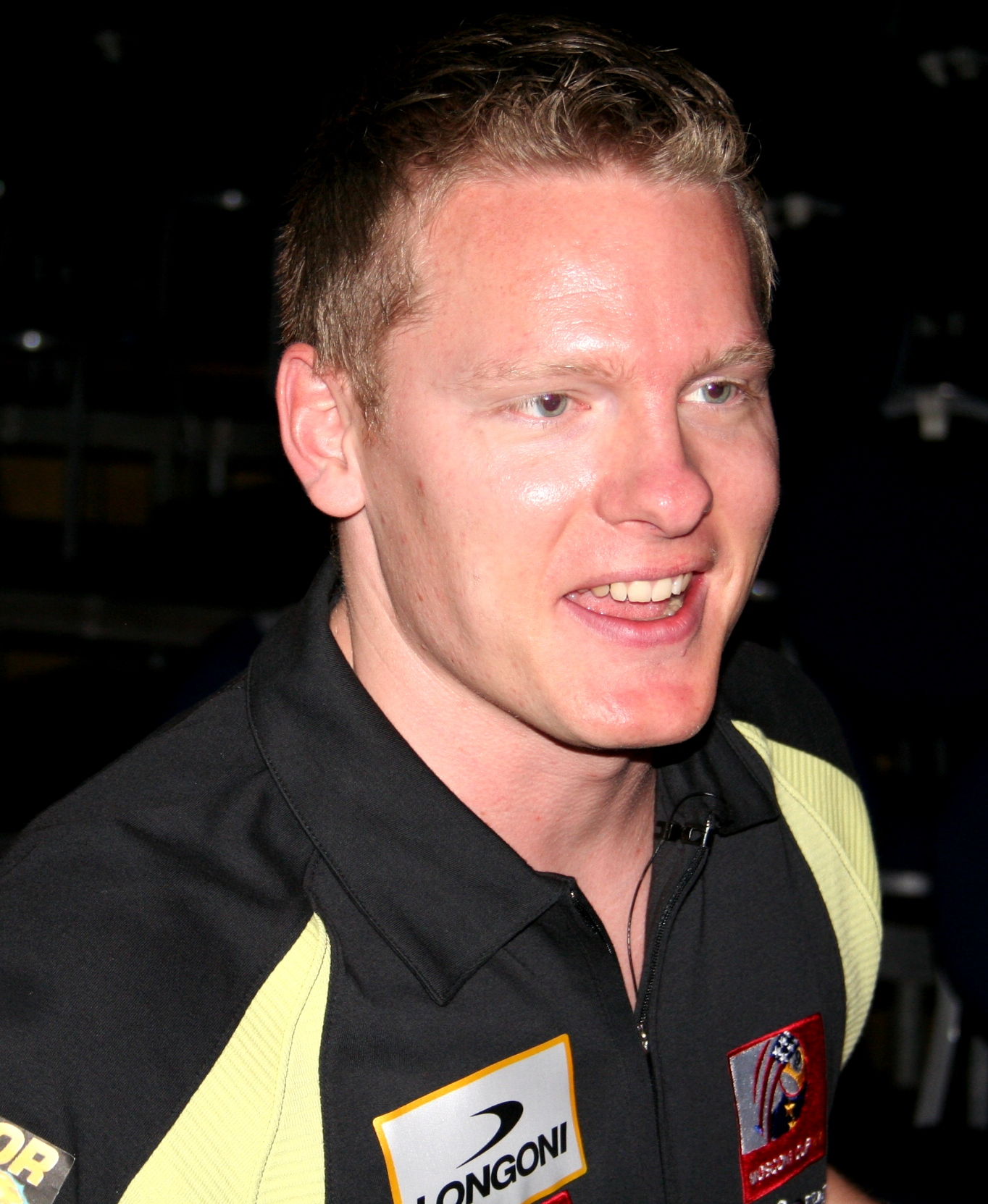
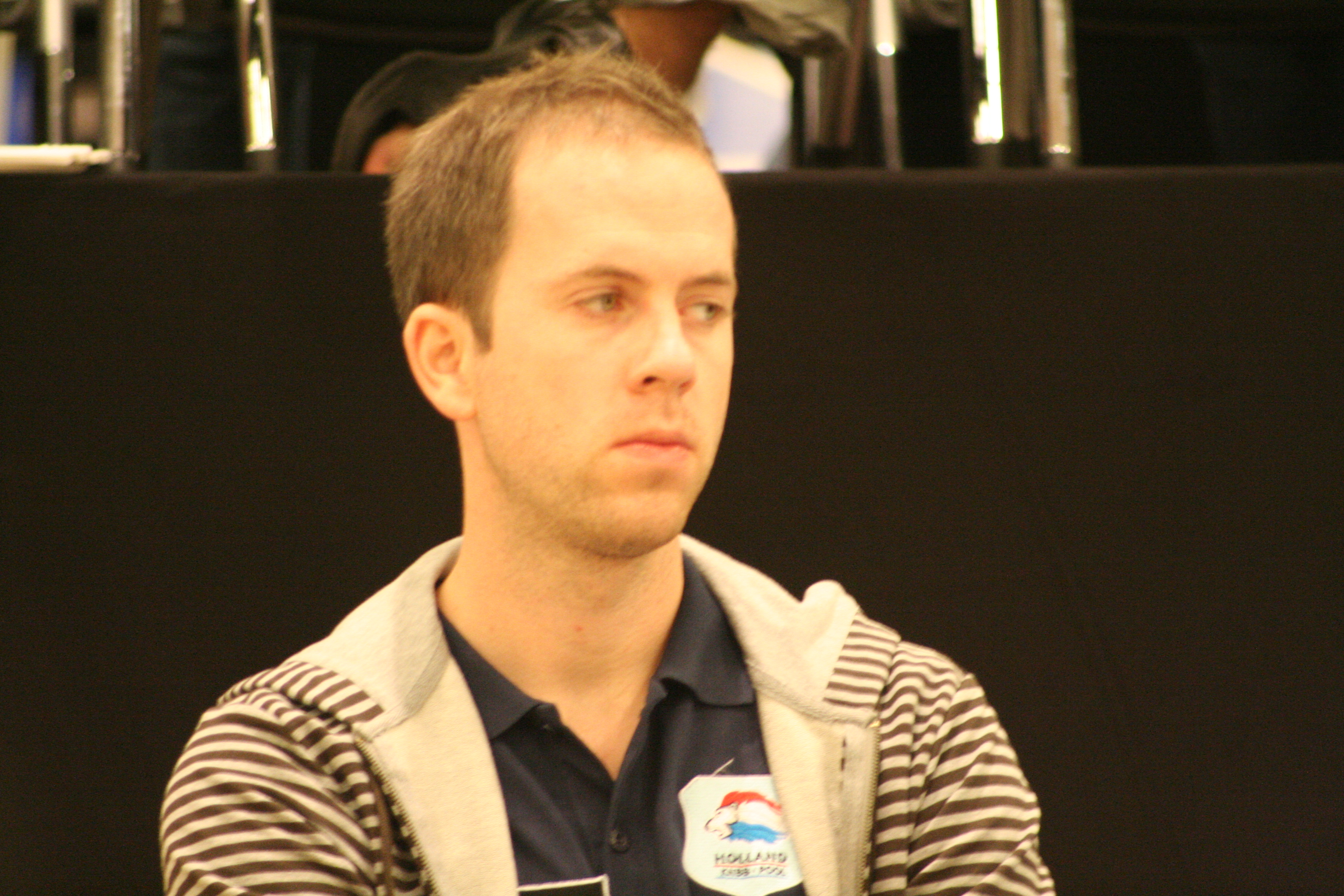
Third seeds (pictured) Niels Feijen and Nick van den Berg were defeated in the first round by Serge Das and Noel Bruynooghe of Belgium 8–3.

The first round was played as a race-to-8 racks. The third-seeded Dutch pairing of Niels Feijen and Nick van den Berg were eliminated by the Belgian duo of Serge Das and Noel Bruynooghe 8–3. Both Netherlands players were ranked in the top five in Europe at the time. Netherlands B, consisting of Roy Gerards and Gijs van Helmond, advanced with an 8–5 win over Chinese Taipei, who were represented by former world champion Wu Jia-qing and Wang Hung-hsiang. The defending champions from China, Li Hewen and Fu Jianbo were tied 5‍–‍5 with India's Alok Kumar and Sumit Talwar, but won three of the next four racks to win 8‍–‍6. The second seed, the Philippines team, Dennis Orcollo and Francisco Bustamante, won 8–2 against Denmark. The English team of Daryl Peach and Mark Gray led 5‍–‍0 and eventually won 8‍–‍4 over the Maltese team.

The previous year's finalist, the Finnish side Mika Immonen and Markus Juva lost in the opening round 4‍–‍8 to Korea. They recovered from 0‍–‍4 down to trail 4‍–‍5, but lost the next three racks, including a golden break in the last. An unwell Vincent Facquet and Stephan Cohen lost to the Canadian team 5‍–‍8. In addition to Finland, Chinese Taipei and the Netherland A sides, two other seeded teams were defeated in the first round. The 14th seed, the Vietnamese side of Lương Chí Dũng and Thanh Nam Nguyen won just one rack as they were defeated 1‍–‍8 by Austria. The 11th seed, the Spanish team of David Alcaide and Carlos Cabello led 7‍–‍2 against the Croatian team. They had to pot only two more balls to win the match. However, they missed the pot on the 8-ball and the Croatians won the next 6 racks to win 8‍–‍7.

The round of 16 was played on 9 October 2008 also as a race-to-8 racks. The defending champions China were playing the Switzerland side of Marco Tschudi and Dimitri Jungo. With the scores tied at 6‍–‍6, Tschudi feathered the cue ball causing a foul. China won the rack before Switzerland tied the score at 7‍–‍7. For the match, Switzerland made a dry break and frustrated Tschudi punched the table. China ran the rest of the rack to win and take a 8‍–‍7 victory. Austria and Belgium were two unseeded teams, and were tied at 6‍–‍6. In rack 13, Serge Das missed a pot on the 2-ball which allowed Austria to win the rack, and ran the next rack to win 8‍–‍6. The ninth seeded Italian team of Fabio Petroni and Bruno Muratore completed an 8‍–‍0 whitewash victory over Korea. This was only the fourth whitewash at the World Cup of Pool. The German team were behind 5‍–‍6, but won the next three racks to defeat Poland. The US team led 7‍–‍2 over the Canadian team of Edwin Montal and Tyler Edey, but lost the next three racks before winning 8‍–‍5. Japan's Satoshi Kawabata and Naoyuki Ōi led 4‍–‍0 over the Dutch B side, but were brought back to 5‍–‍4, before eventually winning 8‍–‍5.

=== Later-rounds (quarter-finals—final) ===
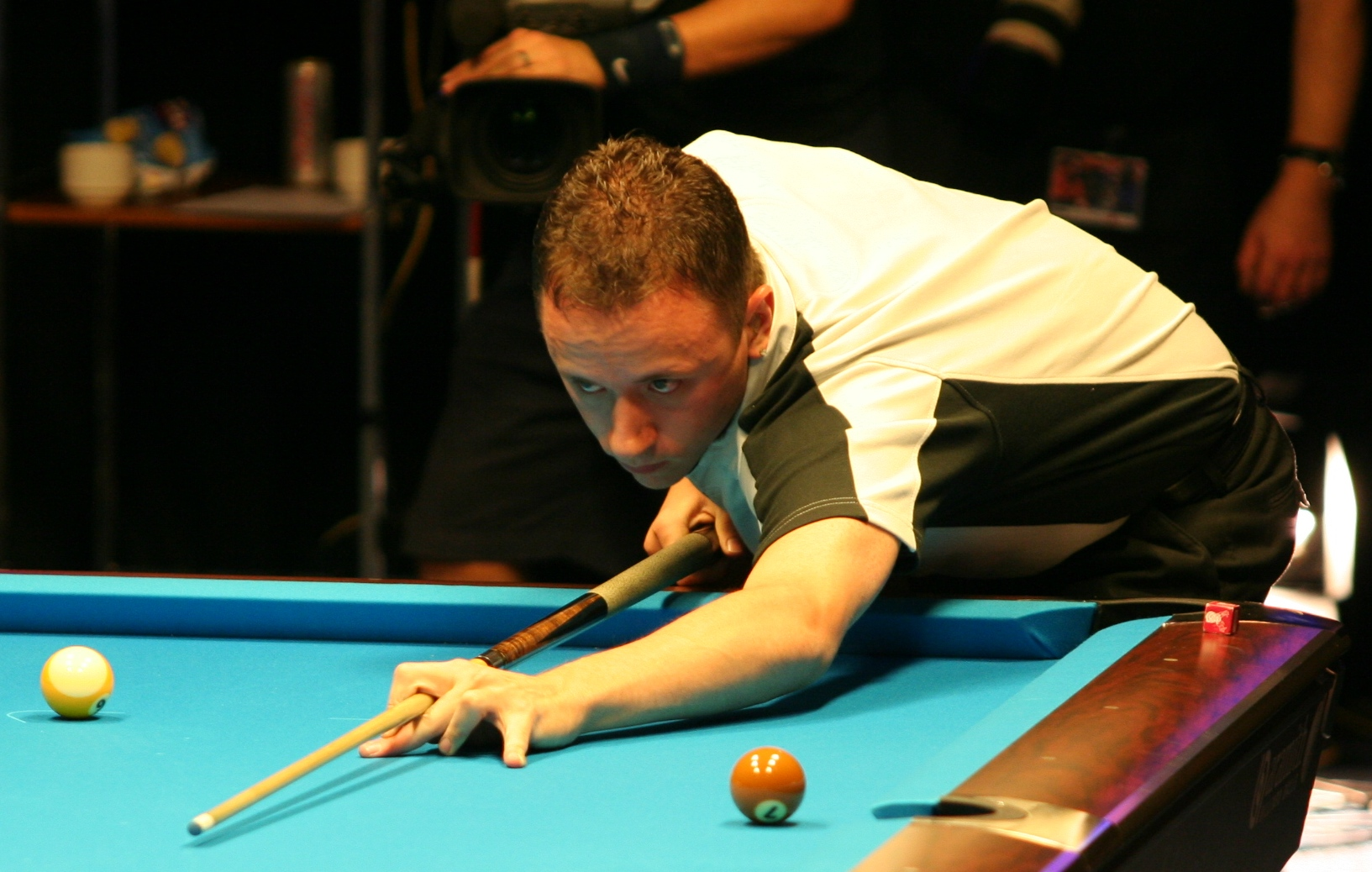
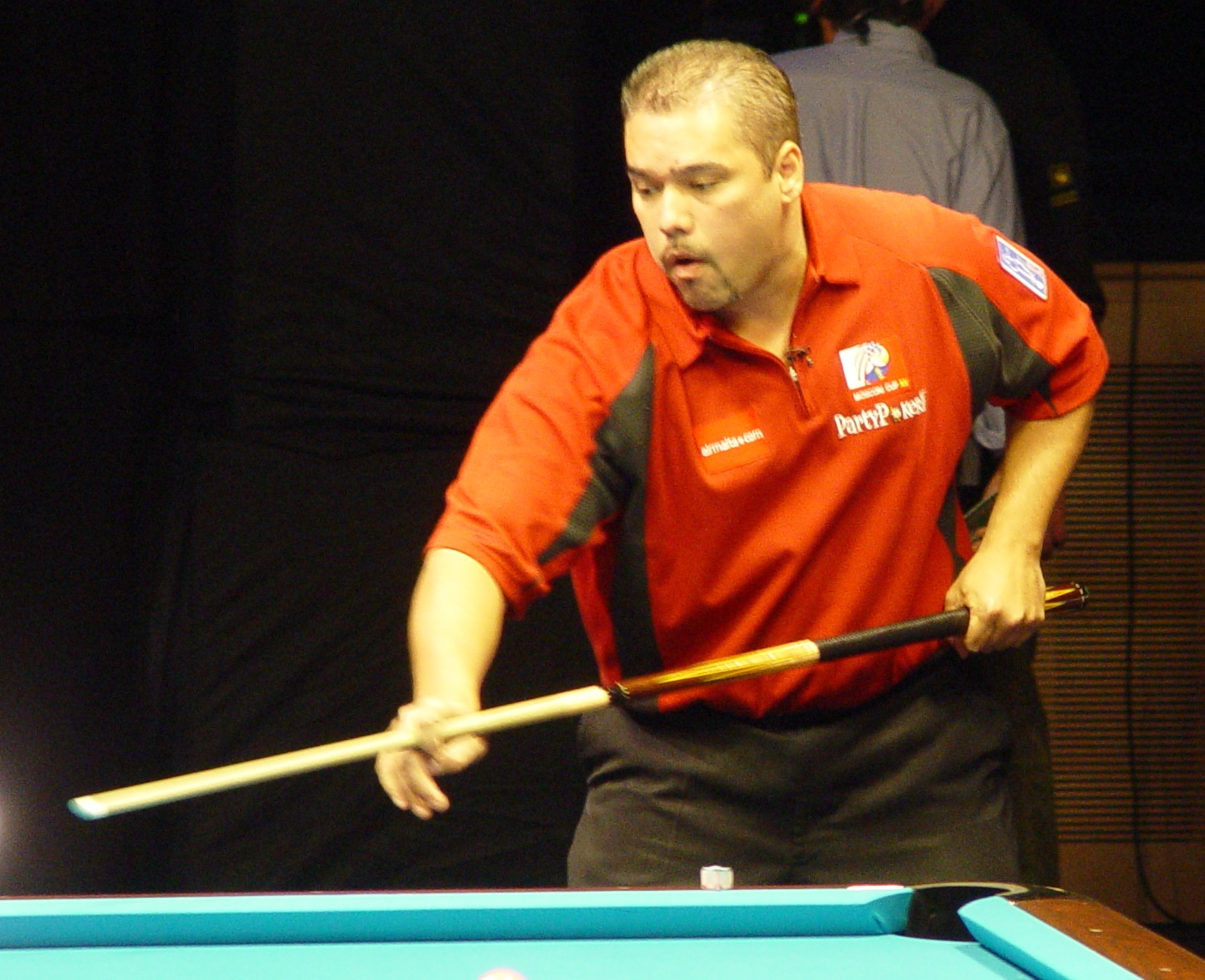
The American team of Shane Van Boening (left) and Rodney Morris (right) won the event for the first time.

The quarter-finals were played as a race-to-9 racks. The Chinese first seeds led 5‍–‍1 and won 9‍–‍2 against the Italian side. In the tenth rack, Petroni looked close to tears after committing a few errors during the match. England led Germany 6‍–‍4 but were tied at 6‍–‍6, England won the next two racks to go to the hill. In rack 15, the break-off was deemed to be illegal by referee Michaela Tabb, allowing Germany to win the rack. However, England won rack 16 to win 9‍–‍7. After the match, the pair commented that "only a tournament win is good enough" with Gray adding "we said before that if we could beat Germany then we would fancy our chances of going all the way and nothing has changed". Austria and the United States team were tied at 7‍–‍7. In rack 15, Austria failed to make a ball on the break allowing the US team to win the rack and go onto the hill, and they won the match after running the next rack. The Filipino team of Dennis Orcollo and Francisco Bustamante lost just two racks as they defeated Naoyuki Oi and Satoshi Kawabata of Japan 9‍–‍2. Their third match of the tournament, they had lost only seven racks, winning 25.

The semi-finals were also played as a race-to-9 racks. The England team overcame the defending champions China 9‍–‍5. Gray commented "We had watched a bit of China and they are very attacking players and go for their shots but had not been under any pressure. We knew if we put them under pressure we would win." The US team were tied at 2‍–‍2 with the Filipino team, but won the next five racks. They eventually won the match 9‍–‍6. This was the second time in three years that the United States team had reached the final. The final was played between the English and United States teams as a race-to-11 racks. The English team recovered from 0‍–‍2 down to trail by one at 3‍–‍4 but then lost the next four frames. The English side left the arena in rack 10 being accused of gamesmanship. The English side won the next two racks before completing a dry break to trail 5‍–‍9. England won the next two racks before the American team won rack 17 to go onto the hill, before running the 18th rack to win the match 11‍–‍7. Van Boening commented that he did not know Morris well before the tournament, but Morris commented that "it's more special for me to see Shane win and I was trying hard not to let him down."

== Tournament bracket ==
Below are the results from the event. Teams in bold denote match winners. Numbers to the left of teams represents the team's seedings.

Round of 32; Race to 8
India	6
1	**China**	**8**
Hong Kong	5
16	**Switzerland**	**8**
Peru	4
9	**Italy**	**8**
**South Korea**	**8**
8	Finland	4
Malta	4
5	**England**	**8**
France	5
12	**Canada**	**8**
Thailand	3
13	**Poland**	**8**
Qatar	3
4	**Germany**	**8**
**Belgium**	**8**
3	Netherlands	3
**Austria**	**8**
14	Vietnam	1
**Croatia**	**8**
11	Spain	7
Iceland	4
6	**United States**	**8**
**Netherlands**	**8**
7	Chinese Taipei	5
Australia	5
10	**Japan**	**8**
Malaysia	4
15	**Russia**	**8**
Denmark	2
2	**Philippines**	**8**

Round of 16; Race to 8
1	**China**	**8**
16	Switzerland	7
9	**Italy**	**8**
South Korea	0
5	**England**	**8**
12	Canada	4
13	Poland	6
4	**Germany**	**8**
Belgium	6
**Austria**	**8**
Croatia	5
6	**United States**	**8**
Netherlands	5
10	**Japan**	**8**
15	Russia	3
2	**Philippines**	**8**

Quarter-finals; Race to 9
1	**China**	**9**
9	Italy	2
5	**England**	**9**
4	Germany	7
Austria	7
6	**United States**	**9**
10	Japan	2
2	**Philippines**	**9**

Semi-finals; Race to 9
1	China	5
5	**England**	**9**
6	**United States**	**9**
2	Philippines	6

Final; Race to 11
5	England	7
6	**United States**	**11**
