= 2008 WPA World Eight-ball Championship =

WPA World 8-Ball Championship 2008
Tournament information
- Dates: April 18,–25, 2008
- Venue: Fujairah Exhibition Centre, Al Diar Siji Hotel
- City: Fujairah, United Arab Emirates
- Organisation: WPA World Eight-ball Championship
- Format: Double Elimination / Single Elimination
- Discipline: Eight-ball
- Participants: 64

Final
- Champion: (Germany) Ralf Souquet
- Runner-up: (Philippines) Ronato Alcano
- Score: 13-9

The 2008 WPA World Eight-ball Championship was an eight-ball world championship, organized by the World Pool-Billiard Association (WPA), and held 18–25 April 2008 at the Fujairah Exhibition Centre of the Al Diar Siji Hotel in Fujairah, United Arab Emirates. A total of 64 players competed in the tournament.

The event was won by Ralf Souquet, who defeated defending champion Ronato Alcano in the final.

The previous years runner up Dennis Orcollo lost in the semi-final in a repeat of the previous years final to Ronato Alcano 10–9. Marcus Chamat of Sweden also reached the event semi-final, losing to eventual winner Souquet.

The event field was made up of players from various tours, as well as players from a middle east qualifying tournament.

== Tournament bracket ==
=== Preliminary round ===
The following players won one match in the preliminary round, and finished between 33 and 48th

(England) Darren Appleton	(Hong Kong) Siu Wai Au	(Malaysia) Ibrahim Bin Amir	(Canada) Francis Crevier
(Philippines) Jeff De Luna	(United States) Corey Deuel	(New Zealand) Matthew Edwards	(Egypt) Mohammed el-Assal
(Philippines) Antonio Gabica	(Austria) Karl Hanscho	(Singapore) Bernard T. C. Kiat	(Japan) Naoyuki Ōi
(Philippines) Israel Rota	(South Korea) Ryu Seung-woo	(United States) Ron Wiseman	(Iran) Kaven Zarakani

The following players did not win a round in the preliminary tournament, and were ranked 49th to 64th.

(United Arab Emirates) Issa al-Boloshi	(United Arab Emirates) Mahmood al-Hashmi	(United Arab Emirates) Muhammed al-Hosani	(Saudi Arabia) Naif al-Jeweni
(United Arab Emirates) Saleem al-Juneebi	(Brunei) Al-Muhtadee Billah	(South Africa) Craig Bouwer	(Philippines) Joven Bustamante
(Greece) Aristides Damoylakis	(Bangladesh) Sayeem Hossain	(Denmark) Martin Larsen	(United Arab Emirates) Mohammed Obaid
(Morocco) Amine Ouahbi	(United Arab Emirates) Omran Salem	(Iran) Farhad Shaverdi	(Guatemala) Carlos Talavera

=== Finals ===
Round of 32; 23 April 2008
(Chinese Taipei) Wu Jia-qing	8
(Philippines) Alan Cuartero	10
(Denmark) Bahram Lotfy	9
(Switzerland) Dimitri Jungo	10
(Sweden) Marcus Chamat	10
(Italy) Gabriele Cimmino	5
(Denmark) Kasper Kristoffersen	10
(Russia) Konstantin Stepanov	6
(Netherlands) Niels Feijen	10
(Netherlands) Huidji See	5
(Philippines) Elvis Calasang	7
(Germany) Ralf Souquet	10
(England) Mark Gray	5
(England) Chris Melling	10
(Germany) Marcus Westen	10
(Austria) Jasmin Ouschan	9
(United States) Shane Van Boening	10
(China) Liu Haitao	3
(Russia) Ruslan Chinakhov	4
(Italy) Bruno Muratore	10
(Qatar) Fahad Mohammadi	0
(England) Daryl Peach	10
(Philippines) Ronato Alcano	10
(Philippines) Roberto Gomez	8
(Philippines) Warren Kiamco	10
(United Arab Emirates) Hanni al-Howri	0
(Poland) Radosław Babica	10
(Japan) Satoshi Kawabata	9
(Chinese Taipei) Wang Hung-hsiang	10
(Germany) Oliver Ortmann	8
(China) Fu Jianbo	7
(Philippines) Dennis Orcollo	10

Last 16; 23 April 2008
(Philippines) Alan Cuartero	8
(Switzerland) Dimitri Jungo	10
(Sweden) Marcus Chamat	10
(Denmark) Kasper Kristoffersen	5
(Netherlands) Niels Feijen	9
(Germany) Ralf Souquet	10
(England) Chris Melling	10
(Germany) Marcus Westen	8
(United States) Shane van Boening	7
(Italy) Bruno Muratore	10
(England) Daryl Peach	5
(Philippines) Ronato Alcano	10
(Philippines) Warren Kiamco	10
(Poland) Radoslaw Babica	7
(Chinese Taipei) Wang Hung-Hsiang	6
(Philippines) Dennis Orcollo	10

'Quarter-final; 24 April 2008
(Switzerland) Dimitri Jungo	6
(Sweden) Marcus Chamat	10
(Germany) Ralf Souquet	10
(England) Chris Melling	3
(Italy) Bruno Muratore	5
(Philippines) Ronato Alcano	10
(Philippines) Warren Kiamco	6
(Philippines) Dennis Orcollo	10

'Semi-final; 24 April 2008
(Sweden) Marcus Chamat	8
(Germany) Ralf Souquet	10
(Philippines) Ronato Alcano	10
(Philippines) Dennis Orcollo	9

Final; 25 April 2008
(Germany) Ralf Souquet	13
(Philippines) Ronato Alcano	9
