= 2010 World Pool Masters =

World Pool Masters XVIII
Tournament information
- Dates: 12–16 May 2010
- Venue: The Riviera
- City: Las Vegas
- Country: United States
- Organisation: Matchroom Sport
- Format: Invitational event
- Total prize fund: $70,000
- Winner's share: $20,000

Final
- Champion: (Philippines) Dennis Orcollo
- Runner-up: (Japan) Toru Kuribayashi
- Score: 8–3

The 2010 World Pool Masters, also known as World Pool Masters XVIII, was a nine-ball pool tournament that took place in The Riviera, Las Vegas, United States, between 12 and 16 May 2010. It was the 18th edition of the invitational tournament organised by Matchroom Sport.

Dennis Orcollo won the event, defeating Toru Kuribayashi in the final 8–3. The previous year's winner, Darren Appleton lost in the last 32 stage to Oliver Ortmann.

== Event prize money ==
	Prize money
Winner	20.000 US$
Runner-up	10.000 US$
Semi-finalist	5.000 US$
Quarter-finalist	2.500 US$
Last 16	2.500 US$
Total	70.000 US$

== Tournament bracket ==
The field was made up of 64 players, with a double elimination round before reaching the last 32, where a single elimination tournament began.

1st Round
(India) Raj Hundal	9
(United States) Ernesto Dominguez	6
(Sweden) Marcus Chamat	7
(Philippines) Dennis Orcollo	9
(Mexico) Rafael Martinez	7
(Canada) John Morra	9
(United States) John Schmidt	9
(Canada) Jason Klatt	8
(United States) Stevie Moore	8
(Indonesia) Ricky Yang	9
(Vietnam) Do Hoang Quan	7
(Germany) Ralf Souquet	9
(United States) Dennis Hatch	5
(Scotland) Jayson Shaw	9
(Philippines) Roberto Gomez	9
(Netherlands) Huidji See	4
(Japan) Naoyuki Ōi	9
(Ukraine) Evgeni Novosad	5
(Chinese Taipei) Lo Li-wen	8
(United States) Charlie Williams	9
(England) Karl Boyes	4
(England) Daryl Peach	9
(Chinese Taipei) Kuo Po-Cheng	3
(Japan) Tōru Kuribayashi	9
(United States) Rodney Morris	9
(England) Mark Gray	7
(Germany) Thomas Engert	9
(United States) Johnny Archer	6
(England) Darren Appleton	7
(Germany) Oliver Ortmann	9
(Germany) Thorsten Hohmann	9
(Netherlands) Niels Feijen	5

2nd Round
(India) Raj Hundal	1
(Philippines) Dennis Orcollo	8
(Canada) John Morra	8
(United States) John Schmidt	4
(Indonesia) Ricky Yang	6
(Germany) Ralf Souquet	8
(Scotland) Jayson Shaw	3
(Philippines) Roberto Gomez	8
(Japan) Naoyuki Oi	5
(United States) Charlie Williams	8
(England) Daryl Peach	0
(Japan) Toru Kuribayashi	8
(United States) Rodney Morris	5
(Germany) Thomas Engert	8
(Germany) Oliver Ortmann	8
(Germany) T. Hohmann	6

Quarterfinals
(Philippines) Dennis Orcollo	8
(Canada) John Morra	3
(Germany) Ralf Souquet	5
(Philippines) Roberto Gomez	8
(United States) Charlie Williams	6
(Japan) Toru Kuribayashi	8
(Germany) Thomas Engert	6
(Germany) Oliver Ortmann	8

Semifinals
(Philippines) Dennis Orcollo	8
(Philippines) Roberto Gomez	6
(Japan) Toru Kuribayashi	8
(Germany) Oliver Ortmann	3

Finals
(Philippines) Dennis Orcollo	8
(Japan) Toru Kuribayashi	3
