= 2012 WPA World Nine-ball Championship =

WPA World 9-Ball Championship 2012
Tournament information
- Sport: 9-ball
- Location: Qatar Billiards and Snooker Federation; Doha, Qatar
- Dates: June 22, 2012–June 29, 2012
- Tournament format: Double elimination / Single elimination
- Host: WPA World Nine-ball Championship
- Participants: 128

Final positions
- Champion: (England) Darren Appleton
- Runner-up: (China) Li Hewen

The 2012 WPA World Nine-ball Championship was a professional nine-ball pocket billiards (pool) championship, sanctioned by the World Pool-Billiard Association (WPA) and organised by Matchroom Sport. It was held from June 22 to 29 in Doha, Qatar, hosted by the Qatar Billiards and Snooker Federation. Qualifying tournaments were held from June 20 to 22, with the Al Sadd Sports Club hosting both qualifying and final tournaments.

British Darren Appleton won the championship defeating China's Li Hewen 13–12 in the final. It was Appleton's second world title after having won the 2008 10-ball World Championship and his first world title in 9-ball. Defending champion Yukio Akakariyama was defeated in the round of 32, by future champion Thorsten Hohmann. A total of US$276,000 in prize money was distributed for the tournament, with the World Champion receiving $40,000.

== Format ==
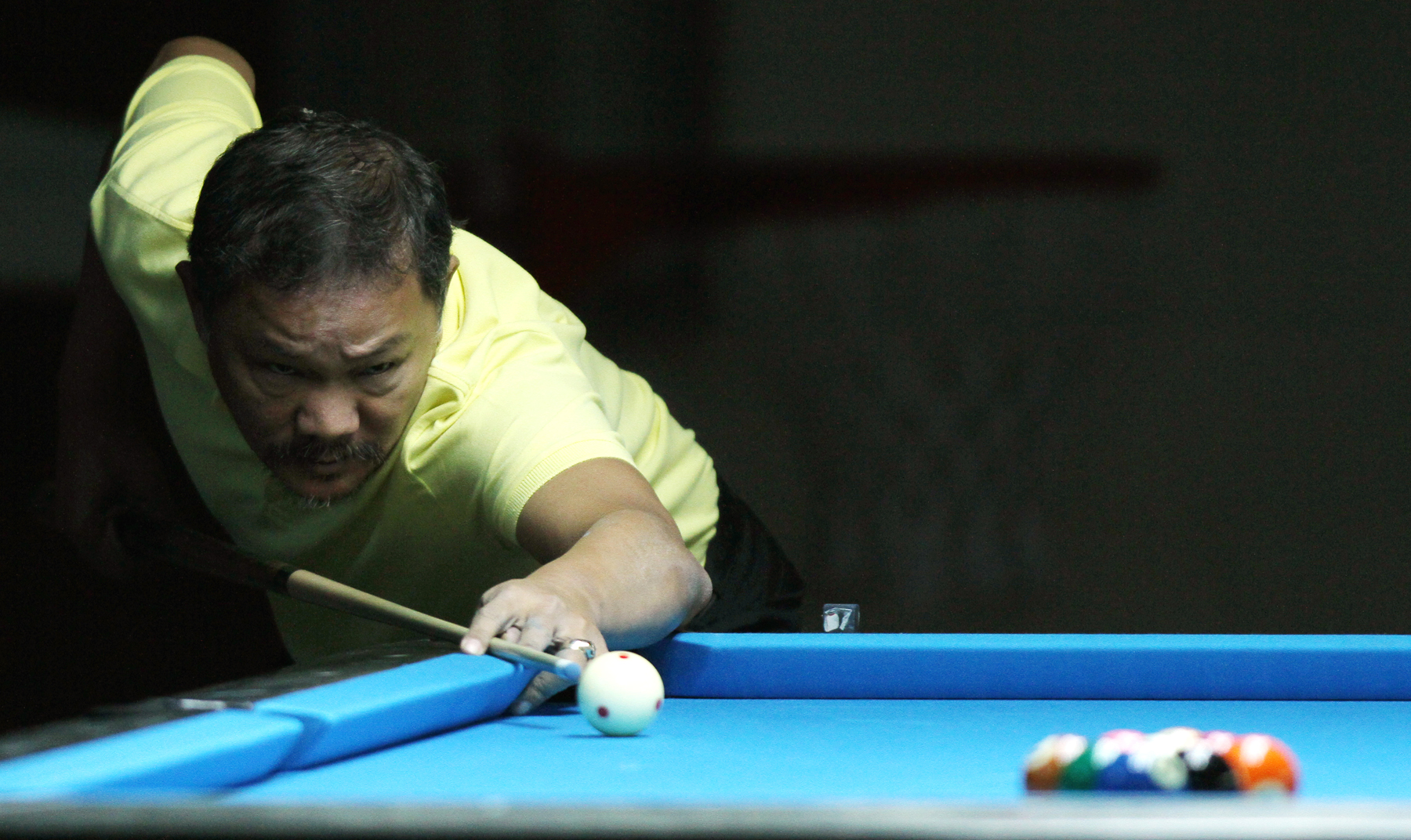
Efren Reyes playing at the event.

The 128 participating players were divided into 16 groups, in which they competed in a double elimination tournament against each other. The remaining 64 players in each group qualified for the final round played in the knockout system. The event was played under the alternating break format.

=== Prize money ===
The event's prize money stayed similar to that of the previous years, with winner Darren Appleton winning $40,000.

Position	Prize
First Place (champion)	$40,000
Second Place (runner-up)	$20,000
Third place (semi-finalist	$12,000
Fifth place (quarter finalist)	$8,000
Ninth place (loser in round of 16)	$5,000
Seventeenth place (loser in round of 32)	$3,500
Thirty Third (loser in round of 64)	$2,000

== Tournament summary ==
The event was played in the alternating break format. In the event's semi-finals, Li Hewen defeated Germany's Ralf Souquet, 11–6, whereas Darren Appleton defeated Japan's Naoyuki Ōi 11–7. In the final, Appleton would take a heavy lead, moving to 9–2 in front, and later 11–3 in a race to 13. Li would make a comeback, to 12–6, before Appleton had the opportunity to win the tournament with an open table in the 19th rack. Appleton would Snooker himself with just four balls left on the table, and Li would win the next 6 racks to make the tournament reach a decisive rack.

Appleton would win the decisive frame, jump up onto the table, lifting his cue above his head. Appleton commented after the event that he was thinking "I can't lose, he needs a miracle" and, that at 12–10, he "started feeling the heat."

== Finals ==
Round of 64
(Germany) Ralf Souquet	11
(Albania) Nick Malai	4
(Venezuela) Jonny Martinez	11
(Japan) Takashi Uraoka	8
(Chinese Taipei) Fu Che-wei	11
(Serbia) Andrea Klasovic	4
(Scotland) Jayson Shaw	6
(Italy) Bruno Muratore	11
(Finland) Aki Heiskanen	5
(Chinese Taipei) Hsu Kai-lun	11
(Hong Kong) Andrew Kong	8
(Philippines) Dennis Orcollo	11
(Netherlands) Nick van den Berg	11
(Philippines) Marlon Caneda	6
(China) Han Haoxiang	11
(Philippines) Israel Rota	8
(Philippines) Lee Vann Corteza	11
(Belgium) Serge Das	4
(Malta) Tony Drago	10
(Finland) Mika Immonen	11
(Philippines) Antonio Gabica	11
(Austria) Mario He	7
(France) Vincent Facquet	4
(Chinese Taipei) Yang Ching-shun	11
(Kuwait) Majed Alazmi	8
(Kuwait) Khaled al-Mutairi	11
(Chinese Taipei) Chang Yu-Lung	10
(Kuwait) Omar Al-Shaheen	11
(Canada) John Morra	11
(Philippines) Elvis Calasang	7
(Canada) Jason Klatt	9
(China) Li Hewen	11
(Philippines) Carlo Biado	10
(Japan) Naoyuki Ōi	11
(Chinese Taipei) Chang Jung-lin	11
(Philippines) Joven Alba	2
(Germany) Thorsten Hohmann	11
(Kuwait) Badr al-Awadi	4
(Germany) Thomas Engert	9
(Japan) Yukio Akakariyama	11
(England) Karl Boyes	11
(Vietnam) Do The Kien	9
(Philippines) Francisco Bustamante	6
(Chinese Taipei) Chao Fong-Pang	11
(Portugal) Manuel Gama	6
(Germany) Dominic Jentsch	11
(Philippines) Efren Reyes	11
(Singapore) Toh Lian Han	6
(Philippines) Roberto Gomez	4
(China) Liu Haitao	11
(Greece) N. Ekonomopoulos	11
(South Korea) Ryu Seung-woo	5
(New Zealand) Matt Edwards	11
(Japan) Tōru Kuribayashi	7
(England) Darren Appleton	11
(Poland) Mateusz Śniegocki	5
(Russia) Konstantin Stepanov	11
(Japan) Ryoji Hori	5
(Philippines) Ronato Alcano	9
(Philippines) Jundel Mazon	11
(England) Daryl Peach	9
(Chinese Taipei) Lo Li-wen	11
(Chinese Taipei) Ko Pin-yi	11
(Netherlands) Huidji See	6

Round of 32
(Germany) Ralf Souquet	11
(Venezuela) Jonny Martinez	7
(Chinese Taipei) Fu Che-wei	9
(Italy) Bruno Muratore	11
(Chinese Taipei) Hsu Kai-lun	8
(Philippines) Dennis Orcollo	11
(Netherlands) Nick van den Berg	11
(China) Han Haoxiang	9
(Philippines) Lee Vann Corteza	5
(Finland) Mika Immonen	11
(Philippines) Antonio Gabica	11
(Chinese Taipei) Yang Ching-shun	9
(Kuwait) Khaled al-Mutairi	6
(Kuwait) Omar Al-Shaheen	11
(Canada) John Morra	8
(China) Li Hewen	11
(Japan) Naoyuki Ōi	11
(Chinese Taipei) Chang Jung-lin	3
(Germany) Thorsten Hohmann	11
(Japan) Yukio Akakariyama	9
(England) Karl Boyes	11
(Chinese Taipei) Chao Fong-Pang	8
(Germany) Dominic Jentsch	11
(Philippines) Efren Reyes	10
(China) Liu Haitao	8
(Greece) N. Ekonomopoulos	11
(New Zealand) Matt Edwards	10
(England) Darren Appleton	11
(Russia) Konstantin Stepanov	3
(Philippines) Jundel Mazon	11
(Chinese Taipei) Lo Li-wen	10
(Chinese Taipei) Ko Pin-yi	11

Round of 16
(Germany) Ralf Souquet	11
(Italy) Bruno Muratore	4
(Philippines) Dennis Orcollo	6
(Netherlands) Nick van den Berg	11
(Finland) Mika Immonen	9
(Philippines) Antonio Gabica	11
(Kuwait) Omar Al-Shaheen	9
(China) Li Hewen	11
(Japan) Naoyuki Ōi	11
(Germany) Thorsten Hohmann	9
(England) Karl Boyes	11
(Germany) Dominic Jentsch	10
(Greece) N. Ekonomopoulos	8
(England) Darren Appleton	11
(Philippines) Jundel Mazon	9
(Chinese Taipei) Ko Pin-yi	11

Quarter-finals
(Germany) Ralf Souquet	11
(Netherlands) Nick van den Berg	9
(Philippines) Antonio Gabica	10
(China) Li Hewen	11
(Japan) Naoyuki Ōi	11
(England) Karl Boyes	9
(England) Darren Appleton	11
(Chinese Taipei) Ko Pin-yi	9

Semi-finals
(Germany) Ralf Souquet	6
(China) Li Hewen	11
(Japan) Naoyuki Ōi	7
(England) Darren Appleton	11

Final
(China) Li Hewen	12
(England) Darren Appleton	13

=== Grand Final ===
Player	Lag	Rack																									Racks won
Player	Lag	1	2	3	4	5	6	7	8	9	10	11	12	13	14	15	16	17	18	19	20	21	22	23	24	25	Racks won
(England) Darren Appleton	•	Won	Won			Won	Won	Won	Won	Won	Won	Won		Won	Won				Won							Won	13
(China) Li Hewen				Won	Won								Won			Won	Won	Won		Won	Won	Won	Won	Won	Won		12
