= Chang Pei-wei =

Taiwanese pool and card player

Chang Pei-Wei
Personal information
- Nickname: Morro
- Born: May 10, 1979 (age 47)

Pool career
- Country: Chinese Taipei
- Pool games: 9-Ball
- Best finish: Quarter finals 2004 WPA World Nine-ball Championship

Chang Pei-Wei (born March 10, 1979) is a Taiwanese pool and card player. Chang was the runner up at the 2004 WPA World Nine-ball Championship and won the gold medal at the World Games 2005.

== Career ==
In 2004, Chang reached the 13th place in the BCA Open 9-Ball Championship. Later, in the 2004 WPA World Nine-ball Championship, Chang won 7 games, but lost in the final against the Canadian Alex Pagulayan 13–17.

In 2005, he lost in the 2005 WPA World Nine-ball Championship in the round of the last 64, but won by a final victory against the German Thorsten Hohmann the gold medal at the 2005 World Games. In the World Pool League 2006, he finished fifth. At the 9-Ball World Championships in 2006 and 2007 he retired in the preliminary round. At the Japan Open in 2007 he reached the fifth place.

In the 10-Ball World Championships 2008 and 2009, he lost both each with a win in the preliminary round. At the China Open 2009, he finished 17th. At the 2008 WPA World Eight-ball Championship, he lost in the semifinals against the Frenchman Stephan Cohen. At the China Open 2013, he reached the 9th place.
