= 2021 Championship League Pool =

Tournament information
- Dates: 22–29 March 2021
- Venue: Marshall Arena
- City: Milton Keynes
- Country: England
- Organisation: Matchroom Pool
- Total prize fund: $85,950

Final
- Champion: Albin Ouschan (AUT)
- Runner-up: David Alcaide (SPA)
- Score: 5-1

The 2021 Predator Championship League Pool was the first edition of the nine-ball pool tournament Championship League Pool. The competition was organised and held by Matchroom Pool and took place at the Marshall Arena in Milton Keynes, England 22–29 March 2021. The tournament was announced to be the first of six major events during 2021.

== Format ==
Nineteen players took part in the tournament. Seven groups plus one winners' group were played over the course of one day each. The first group consisted of seven players who played each other in a race-to-five match, receiving one point for each win. The top four players of a day played the semi-finals and the final with the winner progressing to the winners' group. The player finishing seventh in the group was eliminated from the competition. The remaining five players progressed to next day's group where they were joined by two new players. The format of the second group was the same as the first group with players moving into the third group and so on. In the seventh group only the winner progressed to the winners' group with all other players being eliminated. The same format applied for the winners' group to determine the champion of the tournament.

The group standings were determined by the following order:

- Most points
- Most racks won
- Fewest racks lost
- Head to head result

The tournament took place over eight days throughout March 2021. One group was played on each day from March 22 to March 29.

== Prize money ==
The total prize money was $85,950.

Groups 1-7
Place	Prize money
Winner	$4,000
Runner-up	$2,000
Semi-finalists (x2)	$1,250
5th	$900
6th	$700
7th	$0

Winners' group
Place	Prize money
Winner	$5,000
Runner-up	$2,500
Semi-finalists (x2)	$2,000
5th	$1,500
6th	$1,250
7th	$1,000

== Group stage ==
=== Group 1 - March 22 ===
Pos.	Player	P	W	L	RW	RL	Pts
1	Eklent Kaçi (ALB)	6	5	1	28	20	5
2	Albin Ouschan (AUT)	6	4	2	27	20	4
3	Niels Feijen (NED)	6	3	3	26	24	3
4	Chris Melling (ENG)	6	3	3	23	22	3
5	Ralf Souquet (GER)	6	3	3	22	23	3
6	Kelly Fisher (ENG)	6	2	4	22	28	2
7	Chris Robinson (USA)	6	1	5	17	28	1

Semi-finals
1	Eklent Kaçi (ALB)	1
4	Chris Melling (ENG)	5
2	Albin Ouschan (AUT)	5
3	Niels Feijen (NED)	2

Final
4	Chris Melling (ENG)	5
2	Albin Ouschan (AUT)	3

=== Group 2 - March 23 ===
Pos.	Player	P	W	L	RW	RL	Pts
1	Mieszko Fortuński (POL)	6	5	1	27	13	5
2	Eklent Kaçi (ALB)	6	4	2	27	15	4
3	Niels Feijen (NED)	6	4	2	23	21	4
4	Kelly Fisher (ENG)	6	3	3	20	33	3
5	David Alcaide (SPA)	6	3	3	19	23	3
6	Albin Ouschan (AUT)	6	2	4	18	25	2
7	Ralf Souquet (GER)	6	0	6	15	30	0

Semi-finals
1	Mieszko Fortuński (POL)	4
4	Kelly Fisher (ENG)	5
2	Eklent Kaçi (ALB)	5
3	Niels Feijen (NED)	2

Final
4	Kelly Fisher (ENG)	3
2	Eklent Kaçi (ALB)	5

=== Group 3 - March 24 ===
Pos.	Player	P	W	L	RW	RL	Pts
1	David Alcaide (SPA)	6	6	0	30	15	6
2	Niels Feijen (NED)	6	4	2	25	19	4
3	Albin Ouschan (AUT)	6	3	3	26	20	3
4	Billy Thorpe (USA)	6	3	3	22	26	3
5	Mieszko Fortuński (POL)	6	2	4	20	25	2
6	Kelly Fisher (ENG)	6	2	4	15	26	2
7	Darren Appleton (ENG)	6	1	5	17	25	1

Semi-finals
1	David Alcaide (SPA)	5
4	Billy Thorpe (USA)	4
2	Niels Feijen (NED)	5
3	Albin Ouschan (AUT)	2

Final
1	David Alcaide (SPA)	5
2	Niels Feijen (NED)	2

=== Group 4 - March 25 ===
Pos.	Player	P	W	L	RW	RL	Pts
1	Albin Ouschan (AUT)	6	5	1	27	13	5
2	Niels Feijen (NED)	6	5	1	26	16	5
3	Naoyuki Ōi (JPN)	6	4	2	23	14	4
4	Mieszko Fortuński (POL)	6	3	3	19	19	3
5	Kristina Tkach (RUS)	6	2	4	16	26	2
6	Billy Thorpe (USA)	6	2	4	14	24	2
7	Kelly Fisher (ENG)	6	0	6	16	30	0

Semi-finals
1	Albin Ouschan (AUT)	5
4	Mieszko Fortuński (POL)	1
2	Niels Feijen (NED)	5
3	Naoyuki Ōi (JPN)	1

Final
1	Albin Ouschan (AUT)	0
2	Niels Feijen (NED)	5

=== Group 5 - March 26 ===
Pos.	Player	P	W	L	RW	RL	Pts
1	Albin Ouschan (AUT)	6	5	1	27	15	5
2	Roberto Gomez (PHI)	6	5	1	27	20	5
3	Billy Thorpe (USA)	6	3	3	23	19	3
4	Naoyuki Ōi (JPN)	6	3	3	23	25	3
5	Mieszko Fortuński (POL)	6	2	4	22	25	2
6	Marc Bijsterbosch (NED)	6	2	4	20	25	2
7	Kristina Tkach (RUS)	6	0	6	16	29	0

Semi-finals
1	Albin Ouschan (AUT)	4
4	Naoyuki Ōi (JPN)	5
2	Roberto Gomez (PHI)	5
3	Billy Thorpe (USA)	4

Final
4	Naoyuki Ōi (JPN)	5
2	Roberto Gomez (PHI)	4

=== Group 6 - March 27 ===
Pos.	Player	P	W	L	RW	RL	Pts
1	Alexander Kazakis (GRE)	6	4	2	25	13	4
2	Albin Ouschan (AUT)	6	4	2	25	15	4
3	Billy Thorpe (USA)	6	4	2	25	24	4
4	Marc Bijsterbosch (NED)	6	3	3	22	26	3
5	Casper Matikainen (FIN)	6	3	3	20	20	3
6	Mieszko Fortuński (POL)	6	2	4	21	26	2
7	Roberto Gomez (PHI)	6	1	5	14	28	1

Semi-finals
1	Alexander Kazakis (GRE)	5
4	Marc Bijsterbosch (NED)	1
2	Albin Ouschan (AUT)	5
3	Billy Thorpe (USA)	2

Final
1	Alexander Kazakis (GRE)	0
2	Albin Ouschan (AUT)	5

=== Group 7 - March 28 ===
Pos.	Player	P	W	L	RW	RL	Pts
1	Denis Grabe (EST)	6	5	1	29	18	5
2	Alexander Kazakis (GRE)	6	4	2	25	18	4
3	Mieszko Fortuński (POL)	6	4	2	25	22	4
4	Marc Bijsterbosch (NED)	6	3	3	25	26	3
5	Billy Thorpe (USA)	6	2	4	22	26	2
6	Jasmin Ouschan (AUT)	6	2	4	17	26	2
7	Casper Matikainen (FIN)	6	1	5	21	28	1

Semi-finals
1	Denis Grabe (EST)	3
4	Marc Bijsterbosch (NED)	5
2	Alexander Kazakis (GRE)	0
3	Mieszko Fortuński (POL)	5

Final
4	Marc Bijsterbosch (NED)	5
3	Mieszko Fortuński (POL)	3

== Winners' Group - March 29 ==
Pos.	Player	P	W	L	RW	RL	Pts
1	Eklent Kaçi (ALB)	6	5	1	28	15	5
2	Chris Melling (ENG)	6	4	2	22	24	4
3	David Alcaide (SPA)	6	3	3	25	25	3
4	Albin Ouschan (AUT)	6	3	3	24	21	3
5	Naoyuki Ōi (JPN)	6	3	3	24	25	3
6	Marc Bijsterbosch (NED)	6	2	4	17	24	2
7	Niels Feijen (NED)	6	1	5	21	27	1

Semi-finals
1	Eklent Kaçi (ALB)	2
4	Albin Ouschan (AUT)	5
2	Chris Melling (ENG)	2
3	David Alcaide (SPA)	5

Final
4	Albin Ouschan (AUT)	5
3	David Alcaide (SPA)	1

By winning the Winner's group final, Albin Ouschan became the inaugural champion of the Championship League Pool. and also topped the prize money ranking by earning a total of $16,200

== Broadcasting ==
All groups of the tournament were available worldwide via the following broadcasters:

Country	Channel
United Kingdom (Republic of Ireland) Ireland	Freesports (Table 1); Matchroom Sport (Table 2)
United States; Canada; Brazil; Germany; Austria; Switzerland; Spain; Italy; Japan	DAZN
Rest of the World	Matchroom Sport
