= 2021 Championship League =

2021 Championship League may refer to:

- 2021 Championship League (invitational), a non-ranking snooker tournament held from January to April 2021
- 2021 Championship League (ranking), a ranking snooker tournament held in July and August 2021

== See also ==
- 2021 Championship League Pool
