= Jonni Fulcher =

British pool and snooker player

Jonathan (Jonni) Fulcher (born 22 September 1974 in Inverness, Scotland) is a Scottish professional pocket billiards player. He currently resides in Geneva, Switzerland and competes throughout the world.

== Early days ==
Fulcher first began to play snooker at the age of 10. He moved to London at age 18 to study physics at Imperial College London University; here, he joined the Imperial College Snooker Club. He competed in the British Universities Sports Association national tournaments and won the BUSA individual championships in 1999, following which he captained the England University snooker team to three wins in the Home Nations Team Championships.

== Professional career ==
Fulcher began to compete at the highest level in European snooker and pocket billiards disciplines when he moved to Switzerland in 2003 and won numerous tournaments on the Swiss and European tours.

He was the number-one ranked Swiss Snooker player on numerous occasions from 2004 to 2007. He is the 2004 Swiss Snooker Champion. He reached the quarterfinal of the 2006 Swiss Snooker Open, where over 20 top 50 ranked professionals competed;

Since he has competed in nine-ball events, Fulcher has participated in 15 of the Euro Tour events and secured victory in Frauenfeld, Switzerland, defeating world-class champions such as Ralf Souquet, Roman Hybler, and Tony Drago in the finals, his triumph over Tony Drago was generally thought to be the biggest surprise of the 2006 Swiss Open. He was ranked number two in Europe and 29 in the world in 2007.

He won the 2007 Montfortpokal Austrian Open tournament in Feldkirch, beating a competitive field along the way, namely Michael Felder, Sandor Tot, and Martin Kempter in the final. He also secured the Swiss 2006 team championship title in Bern with his teammates from the Carouge Billiard Club in Geneva. He has made multiple competitive century breaks in snooker tournaments and beat many of the top European snooker and pool players, most notably Thomas Engert, Ralf Souquet, Tony Drago, Christian Reimering, Stefan Cohen, Dimitri Jungo, and Jasmin Ouschan. Though his list of snooker victories is longer than his pool merits, his performance in the PoolComps.com Swiss Open has brought Jonni Fulcher some recognition.

In the 2007 European Snooker Championships he triumphed over Alex Borg, the previous champion, 4–0 and ended his 24 Match unbeaten run. He lost narrowly to top snooker players, 4–3, Ian McCulloch in 2003 Swiss Open quarter final, 3–1 to Neil Robertson at the 2005 Swiss Open last 32 (having made 76 break in the first frame and a 107 clearance in the second frame), and 3–1 Dave Harold in 2006 Swiss Open Quarter Final. He also reached the last 16 of the 2006 Bienne Grand Prix International Nine-ball Championship in Switzerland, losing to Sandor Tot who went on to win the tournament.

In 2017, Fulcher reached the semi-finals of the World 14.1 Tournament but was bested by the eventual winner Lee Vann Corteza.

== Titles ==
- 2012 Busta Open 10-Ball
- 2007 European Snooker Championship
- 2006 Euro Tour Swiss Open
- 2004 Swiss Snooker Championship
