= Ryu Seung-woo (pool player) =

South Korean pool player, born 1985

Personal information
- Born: July 8, 1985 (age 40) Dae-Jeon, South Korea

Pool career
- Country: South Korea
- Pool games: 8-Ball, 9-Ball, 10-Ball
- Best finish: Last 32
- Current rank: 58
- Highest rank: 33 (as of 24 October 2018)

Ryu Seung-woo (born July 8, 1985) is a South Korean pool player. Sueng-woo reached the third round (last 32) of the WPA World championships on three occasions; this included the 2008 WPA World Eight-ball Championship; 2008 WPA World Ten-ball Championship; and the 2014 WPA World Nine-ball Championship. However, he did not progress past this stage.
