= Naoyuki Ōi =

Japanese pool player (born 1983)

Personal information
- Nickname: "Sushi Boom"
- Born: 10 January 1983 (age 43)

Pool career
- Country: Japan
- Turned pro: 2005
- Best finish: Semi finals 2012 WPA World Nine-ball Championship
- Current rank: 7

Naoyuki Ōi (大井 直幸, Ōi Naoyuki; born 10 January 1983) is a Japanese professional pool player. Oi is a two-time runner-up in the WPA World Ten-Ball Championship (2021 and 2024), and a semifinalist in the 2012 World Nine-ball Championship. He also represented Japan at the World Cup of Pool on six occasions.

== Career ==
In July 2005, Ōi competed in the 2005 WPA World Nine-ball Championship, but lost in the preliminary round. In February 2007, he finished fifth at the Korea Pro Pool Tour, and ninth at the Predator International Championship. In October 2007, Ōi took part in the U.S. Open 9-Ball Championships, reaching 17th place. At the 2007 WPA Men's World Nine-ball Championship he was defeated by the German Ralf Souquet. At the 2007 World Pool Masters Ōi reached the last 16 before losing to Oliver Ortmann. In the 2007 U.S. Open 9-Ball Championships, Ōi reached 17th place. At the 2007 WPA Men's World Nine-ball Championship, he was defeated in the last 64 by Ralf Souquet.

In November 2008, Ōi achieved his biggest international success so far: he reached the semi-finals of the All Japan Open, finishing third. In the following season, he reached the semifinals of the 2009 WPA World Ten-ball Championship but lost to Antonio Lining. In March 2010, Ōi reached fifth place at the All Japan Open. At the 2010 World Pool Masters, he lost in the last 16 to Charlie Williams. In the 2010 WPA Asian Nine-ball Tour, he finished fifth. At the 2012 WPA World Nine-ball Championship, Ōi had victories against Chang Jung-lin, Thorsten Hohmann, and Karl Boyes to reach the semifinals before losing to eventual champion Darren Appleton, who defeated him 7–11.

In the All Japan Championship 2014 Ōi reached the final, but lost this against Raymund Faraon 8–11. During the 2017 World Pool Masters, Ōi did two interviews with the television station Sky Sports. Ōi, who speaks little English, responded to a question with lyrics from the song "Pen-Pineapple-Apple-Pen" by comedian Daimaou Kosaka.

Ōi has appeared at the World Cup of Pool on six occasions. First appearing in the 2007 tournament along with partner Satoshi Kawabata, Oi reached the semi-final, losing to champions Li Hewen and Fu Jianbo. In the 2015 tournament he teamed with Tōru Kuribayashi to once again reach the semifinals.

== Titles ==
- 2026 Carabao International Nine-ball Open
- 2024 Taom Maxrack Nine-ball Helsinki Open
- 2024 Kanto Ten-ball Open
- 2022 Kanto Ten-ball Open
- 2019 Japan Open 10-Ball
- 2018 CBSA Miyun Nine-ball Open
- 2017 Kansai Nine-ball Open
- 2016 Hokkaido Nine-ball Open
- 2015 Hokuriku Ten-ball Open
- 2015 Hokkaido Nine-ball Open
- 2014 Hokuriku Nine-ball Open
- 2012 Hokkaido Nine-ball Open
- 2011 Hokuriku Nine-ball Open
- 2011 Okayama Nine-ball Open
- 2010 Hokuriku Nine-ball Open
- 2007 Hokuriku Nine-ball Open
