= Liu Cheng-chuan =

Taiwanese pool player

Liu Cheng-chuan (Traditional Chinese:劉峻銓) is a Taiwanese professional pool player. He was still active in the 2006 WPA Men's World Nine-ball Championship. He was eventually eliminated by runner-up Ralf Souquet in the quarter-finals. Nevertheless, his performance secured him a spot in the 2007 edition of the tournament.
