= Sandor Tot =

Serbian pool player

Personal information
- Nickname: "Bambino"
- Born: February 16, 1972 (age 54) Novi Sad, SR Serbia, SFR Yugoslavia

Pool career
- Country: Serbia
- Turned pro: 2001–
- Pool games: 8-Ball, 9-Ball, 10-Ball
- Best finish: 2010 WPA World Nine-ball Championship (Quarter-final)

Tournament wins
- Major: European Pool Championship 2002
- Minor: Euro Tour – 2 event wins

Sandor Tot is a Serbian professional pool player. During the 2006 WPA World Nine-ball Championship he survived the group stages, the round of 64 and the round of 32, but was eliminated in the round of 16 by Li Hewen. This performance secured him a spot in the 2007 edition of the tournament. Tot plays for Slovenian club Biljard Klub Gomes.

== Titles ==
- 2002 European Pool Championship 8-Ball
- 2004 Euro Tour Dutch Open
- 2004 Euro Tour Spanish Open
