= Martin Kempter =

Austrian pool player (born 1980)

Personal information
- Nationality: Austrian
- Born: September 8, 1980 (age 46) Austria

Pool career

Martin Kempter (born 8 September 1980) is an Austrian professional pool player. He represented Austria at the 2007 World Cup of Pool alongside Albin Ouschan and the 2008 World Cup of Pool with Jasmin Ouschan. Kempter has reached the last 16 of both the 2007 Netherlands Open and the 2008 Austrian Open Euro Tour events. On the Euro Tour, he reached the semi-finals of the 2006 Spanish Open in Malaga.
