= Roberto Gomez (pool player) =

Filipino billiards player

Personal information
- Born: August 5, 1978 (age 47) Zamboanga

Pool career
- Country: Philippines
- Pool games: Nine-ball, ten-ball, eight-ball, one pocket
- Best finish: Runner-up 2007 WPA World Nine-ball Championship

Roberto Gomez (born October 5, 1978) is a professional pocket billiards player from Zamboanga City, Philippines. He competed in the final of both the 2007 WPA World Nine-ball Championships, and the 2007 World Cup of Pool. Gomez was the first qualifier to reach the final of the WPA World Nine-ball Championships.

== Career ==
=== Early life ===
Gomez first played pool at 9 years of age. As a passionate admirer of Efren Reyes, he would often record on tape televised matches of the world champion. Although he had aspirations of competing in professional tournaments, Gomez decided to find other careers in college.

He spent college at Western Mindanao State University and initially try to find a course in architecture. But because broadcasting and political science were the only available, Gomez settled for broadcasting. Through this, he became and served as a reporter for ABS-CBN for a couple of years.

Gomez then returned to pool and began playing professionally.

=== 2007 World Nine-ball Championship ===
Gomez reached the finals of the 2007 WPA World Nine-ball Championship where he took on Daryl Peach of Great Britain. Despite the match being even, Peach won the match 17–15. Though beaten, Gomez became the first qualifier to reach finals of the tournament.

=== 2010 World Cup of Pool ===
Roberto Gomez and Dennis Orcollo represented Team Philippines in the 2010 World Cup of Pool and played their way to the finals. There, they met Team China formed by Fu Jianbo and Li Hewen, who won the 2007 edition of the event. In a rather lopsided final, the Chinese team led 9–1 in the race-to-10 match. Though Gomez and Orcollo would win the next four racks to make it 9–5, Team China got another opportunity to take 15th rack and win the event for the second time.

== Titles ==
- 2026 Kansas City Shootout
- 2026 Beasley Open One Pocket
- 2026 Derby City Classic One Pocket Challenge
- 2025 International Open One Pocket
- 2025 Beasley Open Nine-ball
- 2024 Buffalo's Pro Classic One Pocket
- 2024 Scotty Townsend Memorial Nine-ball
- 2023 Space City Open One Pocket
- 2023 Buffalo's Open One Pocket
- 2023 ALFA Jacoby Ten-ball Classic
- 2023 Midwest Open Billiard Ten-ball
- 2023 Big Tyme Classic Nine-ball
- 2023 Texas Open Banks Game
- 2023 Big Tyme Classic One Pocket
- 2023 The Rack One Pocket Classic
- 2023 Bayou State Classic One Pocket
- 2023 Music City Classic
- 2022 Action Palace High Stakes One Pocket
- 2022 Texas Open One Pocket Championship
- 2022 Diveney Cues Bar Box Classic Ten-ball
- 2022 Diveney Cues Bar Box Classic Eight-ball
- 2021 International Open One Pocket
- 2021 Midwest Open One Pocket Championship
- 2021 Diamond Open Ten-ball
- 2020 Texas Open One Pocket Championship
- 2019 Space City One Pocket
- 2018 Derby City Classic Bigfoot Ten-ball Challenge
- 2017 Chinook Winds Open Eight-ball
- 2016 Four Bears Classic Eight-ball
- 2016 Arkansas Open Nine-ball Championship
- 2009 Villar Cup Isabela Leg
- 2008 Villar Cup Davao Leg
