= Daryl Peach =

English pool player (born 1972)

Personal information
- Nickname: "Dazzler"
- Born: 8 March 1972 (age 54) Castleford, West Yorkshire, England

Pool career
- Country: England
- Turned pro: 2002
- Pool games: Nine-ball

Tournament wins
- World Champion: Nine-ball (2007)
- Highest rank: 1

Daryl Peach (born 8 March 1972) is an English professional pool player, from Lancashire, who resides in Blackpool, England. He won the 2007 WPA World Nine-ball Championship, where he defeated the Philippines' Roberto Gomez 17–15 in the final to become the first British player to win the WPA World Nine-ball Championship.

Representing England with partner Mark Gray, Peach has competed at the World Cup of Pool on six occasions, reaching the final in 2008 and 2015. Peach represented Great Britain and won the inaugural World Team Championship in 2010. He has also represented Europe in the Mosconi Cup in 1995 and 2007, and was a member of the winning team on both occasions. Peach was the youngest winner of the World Pool Masters, his first pool tournament, winning the 1995 event at the age of 23 years and three months. He is also the first player to have been ranked number one in the UK rankings, European tour rankings, and WPA World rankings concurrently.

Peach is a five-time winner on the Euro Tour, having won events from 2007 until 2012. With a total of nine medals from tour events, Peach is the tenth most successful player on the tour of all time.

== Career ==
=== Snooker and transition to pool (1991–1995) ===
Peach was born on 8 March 1972 in Castleford, West Yorkshire, England, and moved to Blackpool when he was 14 years old. Originally a snooker player, he turned professional in 1991 but was unable to reach the TV stages of any tournaments. Peach played alongside the likes of Ronnie O'Sullivan, Mark Williams and John Higgins, who were all battling in the qualifying rounds at the same time. He reached a peak ranking of 250th in the world on the World Snooker Tour. His last snooker tournament was the 1995 Welsh Open, where he lost 4–5 to Matthew Stevens in the opening qualifying round.

Following this loss, Peach was convinced by a friend to take up nine-ball pool, and he entered a UK ranking event "just to see". He won this event in convincing fashion, beating some of the highest ranked UK players along the way. After this initial win, he entered the next three UK ranking events, winning them all to make it four out of four. He quickly rose to the top of the UK pool rankings, and consequently received an invitation to the 1995 European Pool Masters tournament (which later became the World Pool Masters). He sailed through the event and defeated Lee Kendall in the final, making Peach the youngest winner of the tournament at age 23 years and three months. He was then invited to represent Europe at the 1995 Mosconi Cup, partnering pool players Kendall, Oliver Ortmann and Tom Storm, and snooker players Steve Davis, Alex Higgins and Jimmy White. The European team won the series, 16–15, with Peach playing an integral part in Europe's first-ever victory in the event. Following his huge successes, Peach decided not to renew his professional snooker status, opting to play pool instead.

=== Post European Masters (1996–2004) ===
After the promising start to his pool career, Peach spent the next few years cementing his place at the top of the UK rankings, playing between 25 and 30 UK ranking events per year. He slowly started to filter more and more European events into his calendar, along with the occasional world major event. He competed in the World Pool Masters, twice reaching the semi-finals. He reached the quarter-finals of the 2004 WPA World Eight-ball Championship, where he lost to Michael Schmidt 7–10. Peach was also starting to make a breakthrough on the tough Euro Tour, reaching the semi-finals of the Austria Open, and later the final of the German Open where he finished runner-up to Ortmann.

=== United Kingdom number one again... ===
In 2005, Peach reached the main stages of all six Euro Tour events. He progressed to the round-of-16 stage at the Belgium and Swiss Opens, the quarter-finals at the German and Costa Del Sol Opens, and the semi-finals of the Austria Open. He later reached the quarter-finals of the WPA World Eight-ball Championship, after defeating Ralf Souquet in the round of 16, losing to eventual champion Wu Jia-qing. His season results led him to become the number one ranked player in the United Kingdom, a position that was becoming to be a given for Peach.

This success gave him the opportunity to represent England at the 2006 World Cup of Pool doubles event, where he partnered Steve Davis. In the first round, the pair defeated the South Korean team of Jeong Young-hwa and Lee Gun-jae 9–6, but lost in the quarter-finals to Earl Strickland and Rodney Morris of the United States. In late 2006, Peach decided to enter a qualifying event in Holland to win a place on the new International Pool Tour (IPT), which he won. He played in the IPT World Open (eight-ball), finishing in 17th place, and the IPT North American Open, where he finished seventh.

=== World nine-ball champion (2007) ===
In 2007, Peach won his first Euro Tour event, the German Open. En route to the final, he beat Alex Lely 10–6, Dzmitry Chuprov 10–3, Niels Feijen 10–7, Thorsten Hohmann 10–7, and David Alcaide 10–5. In the final, he defeated Dimitri Jungo 10–3.

In November, Peach entered the 2007 WPA World Nine-ball Championship, held at the Araneta Coliseum in Manila, Philippines (the same arena where Muhammad Ali defeated Joe Frazier in the famous "Thriller in Manila" fight), seeded 17th for the event. He won his double elimination rounds, reaching the knockout rounds. He then defeated defending champion Ronato Alcano 10–6, former runner-up Lee Kung-fang 10–7, and Harald Stolka 11–5, to reach the quarter-finals. There, Peach played another former runner-up Francisco Bustamante, who led 10–9 in a race-to-11-racks match. With Bustamante hooked behind the 9 ball, he played a bank shot to make a combination shot on the 9. Despite Bustamante celebrating the victory, referee Nigel Reese consulted a television replay of the shot, and declared it to be a foul, awarding Peach ball in hand. The foul shot was replayed on the big overhead screens, showing that there was no doubt the shot was in fact a foul. Following the decision, it took over 10 minutes for the heavily partisan crowd to settle down and accept the decision. With ball in hand, Peach ran out the high pressured rack to tie the match at 10–10. He then kept Bustamante in his seat, completing his victory with a solid break and run in the final rack decider, winning 11–10.

In the semi-final, Peach defeated Hungarian player Vilmos Földes 11–2 to set up a final match against Roberto Gomez. In the race-to-17-racks match, Peach took to the table better, reaching an early five-rack lead at 8–3. Gomez won six racks in a row to take the lead before Peach went ahead by two at 12–10. Gomez dug in again to retake the lead and go 15–12 ahead. Then it was Peach's turn to build a comeback, levelling the match at 15–15. With two racks required to win the championship, Peach maintained his momentum and won the next rack allowing him to get to the hill. A long safety battle ensued in rack 32, which was dominated by Peach, enabling him to get the first chance. He convincingly ran the rack to win the championship, becoming the first-ever British winner of the event.

Peach was then selected to represent Europe once again, at the 2007 Mosconi Cup, where he partnered Souquet, Feijen, Konstantin Stepanov, and Tony Drago. Peach won his second Mosconi Cup winners medal, making it two from two attempts. In the interview after his match against Earl Strickland, Peach branded his opponent the "scum of the earth", following claims that Strickland had purposefully attempted to distract him. The pair were later separated by referee Michaela Tabb, even after a warning from Tabb to Strickland.

=== Reigning world champion (2008–2010) ===
Following Peach's world championship victory, he reached the round-of-16 stage of both the 2008 WPA World Eight-ball Championship and the U.S. Open Nine-ball Championship. In October 2008, Peach partnered Mark Gray at the 2008 World Cup of Pool. They reached the event's final, losing to the American team of Rodney Morris and Shane Van Boening. The World Nine-ball Championship was cancelled, so Peach retained his world championship status until the event returned in 2010. In the intervening years, Peach won his second and third Euro Tour events at the 2009 Portugal Open and 2010 Italian Open.

Peach was chosen to represent Great Britain at the 2010 World Team Championship alongside Darren Appleton, Imran Majid, Karl Boyes, and Mark Gray. The team qualified for the round of 16, where they defeated Germany 4–0. In their quarter-final against the People's Republic of China, the match finished tied at 3–3, and so a tiebreaker was played in a race-to-six-racks. However, the winning team had to win by two clear racks. The match lasted significantly over six racks, with Peach making the winning shot to win 27–25. The team defeated Greece 4–2 to reach the final. In the final, the team played the Filipino team, winning 4–1 to become world champions.

=== Post world championship (2011–present) ===
In 2011, Peach won both the international nine-ball and international eight-ball, a feat which has never been repeated. He reached the quarter-final of both the World nine-ball and ten-ball championships. The following year, Peach won his fourth and fifth Euro Tour events at the 2012 German Open. and 2012 Portugal Open.

At the 2015 World Cup of Pool, Peach and partner Mark Gray reached the final once again, but lost 8–10 to the Chinese Taipei team of Ko Pin-yi and Chang Yu-lung.

After this point, Peach lost both his parents, and also had a major injury to his right shoulder, which meant that he played sporadically in tournaments since.

== Personal life ==
Peach is married to Lesley Peach; they have one child named Ellie. Peach is an amateur golfer, having gained a handicap of eight in 2010. When not playing pool, he develops real estate.

== Titles ==
- 2013 Interpool Open 10-Ball Challenge
- 2012 Longoni Benelux Open
- 2012 Euro Tour German Open
- 2010 WPA World Team Championship
- 2010 Euro Tour Italy Open
- 2010 GB Blackpool Pro Cup
- 2009 Lugo International Nine-Ball Open
- 2009 Euro Tour Portugal Open
- 2007 WPA World Nine-ball Championship
- 2007 Mosconi Cup
- 2007 Euro Tour German Open
- 1995 Mosconi Cup
- 1995 World Pool Masters
