= Charlie Williams (pool player) =

American pool player and promoter (born 1977)

Personal information
- Born: 5 January 1977 (age 49) Seoul, South Korea

Pool career
- Country: United States
- Pool games: 9-Ball, Straight pool

Charlie Williams (born January 5, 1977, in Seoul, South Korea) is an American professional pool player. Williams represented America as a player at the Mosconi Cup 5 times (2001, 2002, 2003, 2004 and 2005) and as a non-playing captain in 2011. In 2001, Williams founded the sports marketing company Dragon Promotions.

At the 2008 WPA World Ten-ball Championships, Williams would reach the quarter-finals, defeating Chang Jung-lin (9–8), and Fu Che-wei (9–5), before losing to Darren Appleton 11–5.

In 2011, Williams reached the semi-finals of the Dragon 14.1 Tournament but lost to Mike Davis.

== Career titles ==
- 2010 Derby City Classic 14.1 Challenge
- 2008 Lucasi 10-Ball
- 2008 Quezon City Invasion
- 2007 Korea Pro Tour Championship
- 2006 JBC Japan Championship
- 2006 Seminole Florida Pro Tour
- 2005 Mosconi Cup
- 2005 Korea International Championship
- 2004 Florida State 9-Ball Championship
- 2004 Mosconi Cup
- 2003 Firecracker Open
- 2003 UPA Big Apple 9-Ball Challenge
- 2003 UPA Capitol City Classic
- 2003 Mosconi Cup
- 2002 BCA Open 9-Ball Championship
- 2001 Mosconi Cup
- 2001 Turning Stone Classic
