= Fu Che-wei =

Taiwanese Pool player

Fu Che-Wei
Personal information
- Nickname: "Draw Shot Prince"
- Born: 21 December 1973 (age 52)

Pool career
- Country: Chinese Taipei
- Turned pro: 2004
- Pool games: 8-Ball, 9-ball, 10-ball
- Best finish: Semi finals 2006 WPA World Nine-ball Championship

Fu Che-wei born December 21, 1973 (Traditional Chinese: 傅哲偉; Tongyong Pinyin: Fù Ché-Wěi) is a Chinese Taipei professional pool player, nicknamed "the Draw Shot Prince."

== Career ==
Fu made his first notable appearance when he finished among the top 32 competitors in the 2004 WPA World Nine-ball Championship (losing to Earl Strickland). He made a comeback at the 2006 event, but he was eventually eliminated by runner-up Ralf Souquet in the semi-finals. The performance would win earn him a place in the following year's event, but he was eliminated in the second round by Mika Immonen.

Che-Wei reached the final of the 2012 WPA World Eight-ball Championships; defeating Huidji See in the quarter-finals 9–4, and Liu Haitao 9–3 in the semi-final, before losing in the final to Chang Jung-lin 11–6. Fu has also competed at the WPA World Ten-ball Championships, reaching the last 16 in 2008.

== Titles ==
- 2012 WPA World Team Championship
