= Mark Gray (snooker player) =

British pool and snooker player

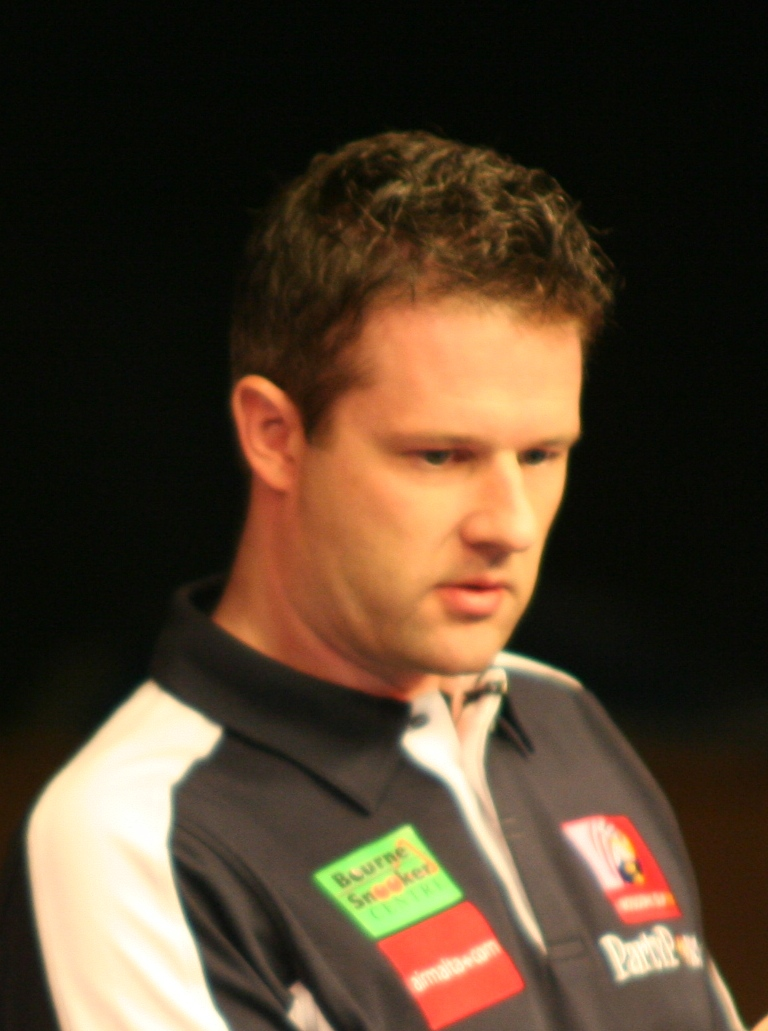
- Gray in 2008

Personal information
- Born: 16 August 1973 (age 53) Baston, Lincolnshire, England

Sport
- Country: England
- Sport: Snooker
- Professional: Snooker 1992–2008, pool 2008-present
- Highest ranking: 79 (1999/2000)
- Best ranking finish: Last 32 (x2)

Tournament wins
- World Championship: Team (2010)

Mark Gray (born 16 August 1973) is an English professional pool player and former professional snooker player.

== Snooker career ==
Born in 1973, Gray turned professional in 1992. He made little progress in any tournament until the 1997/1998 season, when he reached the last 64 at the German Open - losing 1–5 to Karl Broughton - the last 48 at the Thailand Masters, where Chris Small whitewashed him 5–0, and later made his first appearance in the last 32 at a ranking event, in the 1998 British Open. There, he defeated Jimmy Michie 5–3 and Jimmy White 5–4, but lost 3–5 to Dominic Dale.

The following season saw Gray repeat his feat at the British Open, beating Bjorn Haneveer 5–2, Paul Wykes 5–4 and Jamie Burnett 5–3, having trailed Burnett 1–3. He was again eliminated at the last 32 stage, this time 4–5 by Peter Ebdon.

Gray's ranking improved to a career-best 79th for the 1999/2000 season, but his form declined thereafter. In the 2000 UK Championship, he again met Small and led 3–2, but succumbed 3–9; he met Steve Davis in the last 48 at the 2001 Scottish Open, but was whitewashed 5–0 by the six-time World Champion.

Gray reached his first quarter-final at the 2001 Benson & Hedges Championship, but was defeated 1–5 by the eventual finalist, Hugh Abernethy.

Having finished the 2002/2003 season ranked 103rd, Gray dropped off the tour, and entered several qualifying events the following season to regain his place. He was successful in this, but played only four matches in the 2004/2005 season; the last of these, a 3–5 Malta Cup defeat to Darren Morgan, was Gray's final at competitive level. Finishing that season ranked 97th, he left the professional game once more at the age of 31.

== Career finals ==
=== Non-ranking finals: 2 (1 title) ===
Outcome	No.	Year	Championship	Opponent in the final	Score
Winner	1.	2001	WPBSA Open Tour – Event 1	(England) Shaun Murphy	5–2
Runner-up	1.	2002	WPBSA Open Tour – Event 5	(England) Lee Spick	3–5

=== Pro-am finals: 2 ===
Outcome	No.	Year	Championship	Opponent in the final	Score
Runner-up	1.	2002	EASB Open Tour – Event 2	(Wales) Ryan Day	3–5
Runner-up	2.	2003	EASB Open Tour – Event 3	(England) Rory McLeod	2–5

=== Amateur finals: 1 (1 title) ===
Outcome	No.	Year	Championship	Opponent in the final	Score
Winner	1.	1997	English Open	(England) Luke Simmonds	8–4

== Pool career ==
After his snooker career ended, Gray began playing pool, becoming a full-time professional player in 2010. In 2008, he was the number one nine-ball player in Britain and Europe, having won the 2007 Swiss 9-Ball Championship; Gray was also part of the Mosconi Cup-winning European team of 2008, 2014 and 2016. Alongside Daryl Peach, Gray was the runner up at the 2008 World Cup of Pool, losing to the American team of Rodney Morris and Shane Van Boening 11–7.

== Career titles ==
- 2016 Mosconi Cup
- 2016 Euro Tour Austrian Open
- 2015 GB Midlands Classic Main Event
- 2015 Euro Tour Treviso Open
- 2014 Mosconi Cup
- 2014 Euro Tour Dutch Open
- 2012 GB Southern Masters Challenge Cup
- 2011 Sarajevo Coloseum 10-Ball Open
- 2011 Euro Tour Treviso Open
- 2010 WPA World Team Championship
- 2010 GB Midlands Classic Pro Cup
- 2009 Euro Tour Costa del Sol Open
- 2008 Mosconi Cup
- 2007 Euro Tour Swiss Open
