= Tyler Edey =

Canadian pool player (born 1980)

Personal details
- Born: February 29, 1980 (age 46) Canada

Tyler Edey (born February 29, 1980) is a Canadian pocket billiards player. He won the nine-ball event at the BCA Pool League National Championships in 2008. He reached the last 16 of the 2006 WPA Men's World Nine-ball Championship, before being defeated by Liu Cheng-chuan.

== Career ==
In the US Open Tyler Edey reached the 13th place in 2004. In 2006, he lost in the Nine-ball World Cup only in the second round against the Taiwanese Liu Cheng-chuan. In 2007 he retired in the preliminary round.

Tyler Edey took the first place in the 8-Ball Championship. "I am a better player this year. I've lost so much. I don't want to come in second anymore," said an overjoyed Edey.

Previously he had lost World Cup of Masters in the round of 16 against Wu Jia-qing. In 2008 Edey reached the 19th place at the Derby City Classic in 9-Ball. He finished fifth in the Predator International Championship, and in the sixteenth finals of the 10-Ball World Cup he was eliminated by the Chinese Liu Haitao. He finished seventeenth in the US Open in 2008. In 2009 he lost in the second round against the Philippines Dennis Orcollo, at the 10-Ball World Cup, he did not get beyond the preliminary round. At the World Pool Masters 2010 he also retired in the preliminary round.

Edey represented Canada three times at the World Cup of Pool. In 2006 and 2008 he reached the round of 16 with Luc Salvas and Edwin Montal, in 2009 he left with Jason Klatt in the first round.

Edey was also a player of the Canadian team at the 2010 World Billiards Championship; in the third losers round against Denmark he was eliminated.
