= Vilmos Földes =

Hungarian Pool player

Vilmos Foldes
Personal information
- Born: December 16, 1984 (age 41)

Pool career
- Country: Hungary
- Pool games: 9-ball
- Best finish: Semi finals 2007 WPA World Nine-ball Championship

Vilmos Földes (sometimes transliterated as Foeldes or occasionally Foldes; born 16 December 1984) is a Hungarian professional pocket billiards (pool) player.

Based in Pécs, Hungary's fifth-largest city, Földes competed in the 2006 WPA World Nine-ball Championship in which he survived the group stages and the round of 64, but was eliminated in the round of 32 by Lương Chí Dũng. In the 2007 World Nine-ball Championship he reached the semifinals but was defeated by Daryl Peach. Földes has also competed in the World Pool Masters Tournament.

== Titles ==
- 2022 Andy Mercer Memorial 9-Ball
- 2020 Andy Mercer Memorial 9-Ball
- 2019 Andy Mercer Memorial 9-Ball
- 2019 Jay Swanson Memorial 9-Ball
- 2016 Chuck Markulis Memorial 9-Ball
- 2003 WPA World Nine-ball Junior championship
