= Wang Hung-hsiang =

Taiwanese pool player

Wang Hung-hsiang (Chinese: 王泓翔; pinyin: Wáng Hóngxiáng; born 7 April 1981) is a Taiwanese professional pool player, nicknamed "the Master." During the 2006 WPA Men's World Nine-ball Championship he survived the group stages and the round of 64, but was eliminated in the round of 32 by Wu Jia-qing.

On September 21, 2008, Dennis Orcollo defeated Hung-hsiang 11–9 to win the Guinness 9-ball Tour championship in Guangzhou, China (WPA Asian Nine-ball Tour).
