= Ricky Yang =

Indonesian pool player

Ricky Yang is an Indonesian professional pool player of Chinese ancestry. His nickname is "The Piranha". On June 5, 2009, Yang defeated Jeff De Luna by 11–4 in the 2009 Philippine Open Pool Championship final at SM Megamall in Mandaluyong, Philippines, the first international WPA World Ranking Tour for him and for Indonesia. In 2013 he won the gold medal for 9 Ball Pool at the SEA Games in Myanmar.

== Titles ==
- 2013 Southeast Asian Games Nine-ball Singles
- 2011 Southeast Asian Games Nine-ball Singles
- 2009 Philippine Open 10-Ball
- 2007 Southeast Asian Games Nine-ball Singles
