= Fu Jianbo =

Chinese pool player

Personal information
- Born: 30 January 1976 (age 50)

Pool career
- Country: China
- Pool games: 9-Ball, 10-Ball

Tournament wins
- Major: 2007 World Cup of Pool
- Highest rank: 16

Fu Jianbo (sometimes referred to as Jianbo Fu in Western media) is a professional pool player from the People's Republic of China.

== Career ==
In 2007, Fu along with Li Hewen represented China at the 2007 World Cup of Pool. The pair won the event defeating a Finland team of Mika Immonen and Markus Juva. The pair later won the event three years later, this time against Filipino team of Dennis Orcollo and Roberto Gomez at the 2010 World Cup of Pool.

Fu also won the 2008 International Challenge of Champions and its US$50,000 winner-take-all prize by defeating Dennis Orcollo.

Fu reached the finals of the 2010 WPA World Ten-ball Championship but lost to Huidji See.

== Titles & Achievements ==
- 2014 CBSA Miyun International Open
- 2010 World Cup of Pool - with (Li Hewen)
- 2008 International Challenge of Champions
- 2007 Asian Indoor Games Nine-ball Singles
- 2007 World Cup of Pool - with (Li Hewen)
