= Dimitri Jungo =

Swiss pool player

Personal information
- Nickname: BB Striker
- Nationality: Swiss
- Born: March 5, 1983 (age 43) Switzerland

Pool career

Dimitri Jungo (born 5 March 1983) is a Swiss professional pool player. A former World Junior Champion, he is one of Switzerland's most successful players on the international circuit, with multiple titles on the Euro Tour and the European Pool Championships.

== Career ==
Jungo was a winner of the WPA World Nine-ball Junior Championship in 2000. He defeated Germany's Brian Naithani in the final. In 2009, he became the European Straight Pool Champion, defeating Niels Feijen in the final. Jungo won the 2011 German Open on the Euro Tour. He was also runner up at the 2012 Bosnia & Herzegovina Open and 2013 Treviso Open.

In 2022, he reached the last 16 of the 2022 WPA World Nine-ball Championship.
