= Li Hewen =

Chinese professional pool player

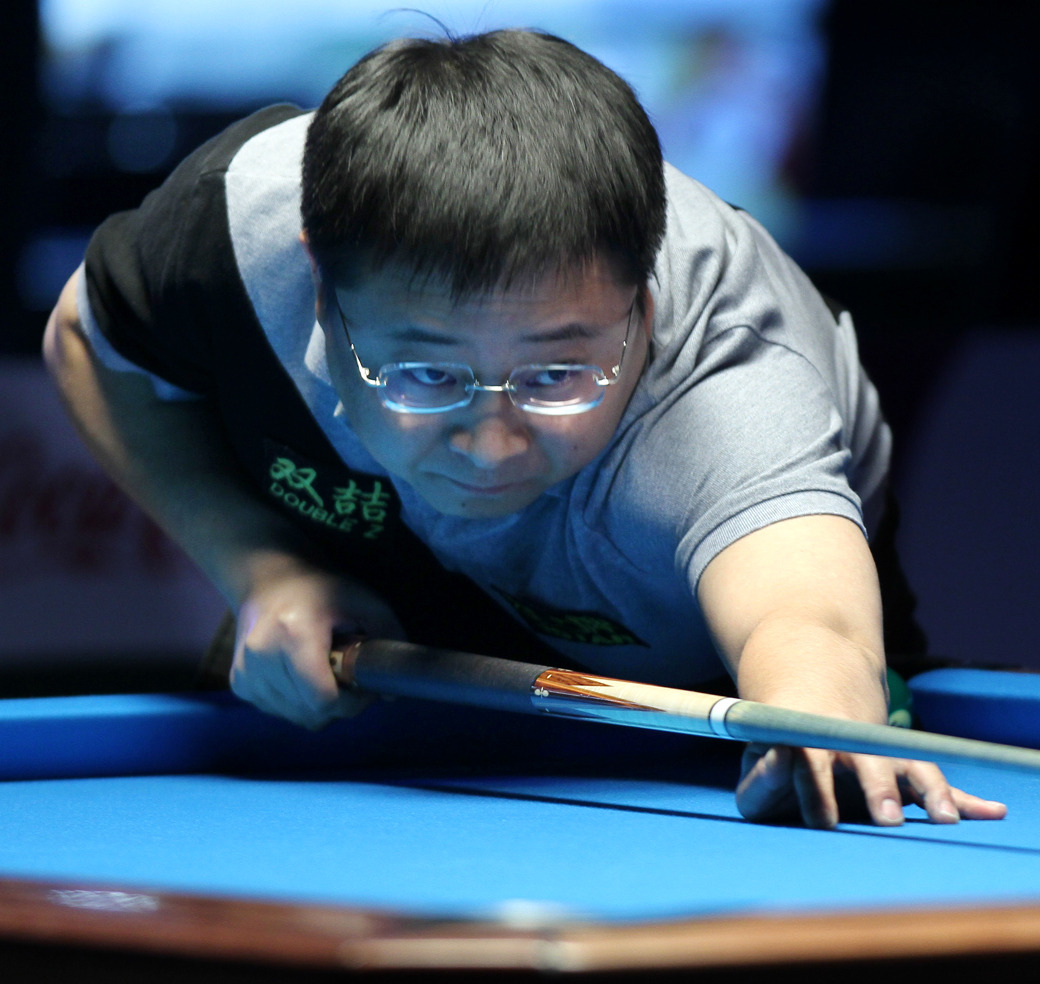
- Li Hewen at the 2012 WPA World Nine-ball Championship in Doha

Personal information
- Born: 30 November 1981 (age 44) Liaoning Province, China

Pool career
- Country: China
- Pool games: 9-Ball
Medal record
Representing China
Men's Nine-ball
WPA World Nine-ball Championship
| Silver medal – second place | 2012 Doha | Singles |
World Cup of Pool
| Gold medal – first place | 2007 Rotterdam | Doubles |
WPA Asian Nine-ball Tour
| Silver medal – second place | 2006 Vietnam | Singles |

Li Hewen (Chinese: 李赫文; pinyin: Lǐ Hèwén; born November 30, 1981, in Liaoning, China) is a Chinese professional pool player. He made it to the finals in the Vietnam leg of the 2006 WPA Asian Nine-ball Tour, but lost to Efren Reyes.

In 2006, Li Hewen reached the semi-finals of the WPA World Nine-ball Championship, which was the farthest ever achieved by a player from China. However, his run came to an end upon facing Ronato Alcano who would later win the title.

In 2007, Li Hewen along with Fu Jianbo represented Team China in the World Cup of Pool where they won the title defeating Team Finland of Mika Immonen and Markus Juva.

Li contested the final of the 2012 WPA World Nine-ball Championship, however, he was defeated by Darren Appleton.

== Titles ==
- 2010 World Cup of Pool - with (Fu Jianbo)
- 2009 Asian Indoor Games Nine-ball Singles
- 2007 World Cup of Pool - with (Fu Jianbo)
