= 2006 WPA World Nine-ball Championship =

WPA World 9-Ball Championship 2006
Tournament information
- Sport: 9-ball
- Location: International Convention Center, Pasay, Philippines
- Dates: 4 November 2006–12 November 2006
- Tournament format: Round robin / Single Elimination
- Host: WPA World Nine-ball Championship
- Participants: 128

Final positions
- Champion: (Philippines) Ronato Alcano
- Runner-up: (Germany) Ralf Souquet

The 2006 WPA World Nine-ball Championship was the seventeenth edition of the WPA World Nine-ball Championship and took place between 4 and 12 November 2006 at the Philippine International Convention Center in Pasay, Philippines. The event was to be held for the first time in the Philippines, on a two-year deal, including the 2007 WPA World Nine-ball Championship. The championships were hosted by the World Pool Billiard Association (WPA).

Ronato Alcano won the championship with a 17–11 win in the final against Ralf Souquet of Germany. Defending champion Wu Jia-qing was defeated in the quarter-final by Alcano.

== Tournament format ==
The event featured 128 players, with an alternate break. The event featured a preliminary round robin format to half the field to 64; where the event changed to a knockout format.

=== Prize money ===
Position	Prize
First Place (champion)	$100.000
Second Place (runner-up)	$40.000
Third Place (semi-finalist)	$20.000
Fifth place (quarter finalist)	$10.000
Ninth place (loser in round of 16)	$4.500
Seventeenth place (loser in round of 32)	$3.000
Thirty Third (loser in round of 64)	$2.000
Sixty Fifth place (Third place in round robin group)	$1.000
Ninety Seventh place (Fourth place in round robin group)	$0

== Preliminary round ==
The Preliminary round was played over three days between 4 and 7 November. There were 32 groups of 4, with the first two in each group progressing. Nine top 32 players were knocked out in this section (Note: With their seeding in brackets)

- (Philippines) Alex Pagulayan (4)
- (Finland) Mika Immonen (11)
- (United States) Rodney Morris (12)
- (Netherlands) Niels Feijen (18)
- (Philippines) Jose Parica (23)
- (Netherlands) Alex Lely (25)
- (Chinese Taipei) Chang Pei-Wei (26)
- (Germany) Christian Reimering (28)
- (Japan) Kunihiko Takahashi (29)

== Final round ==
The qualifying 64 players would play a knockout structure over six days. The first two rounds were competed as "race to 10", the next three rounds as "race to 11", and the final, as a "race to 17".

Round of 64; 8 November 2006
(Philippines) Roberto Gomez	1
(Philippines) Ronato Alcano	10
(Philippines) Dennis Orcollo	6
(Philippines) Efren Reyes	10
(Chinese Taipei) Hsia Hsun-Kai	3
(Chinese Taipei) Kuo Po-cheng	10
(Philippines) Marlon Manalo	10
(Singapore) Chang Keng-Kwang	5
(Scotland) Pat Holtz	10
(Japan) Tamoo Takano	6
(Chinese Taipei) Chang Jung-lin	6
(England) Kevin Uzzell	10
(Chinese Taipei) Wu Jia-qing	10
(United States) Corey Deuel	3
(Germany) Michael Schmidt	5
(Chinese Taipei) Wang Hung-hsiang	10
(France) Vincent Facquet	4
(Chinese Taipei) Lee Kun-fang	10
(Netherlands) Nick van den Berg	8
(Philippines) Jeff de Luna	10
(Mexico) Ernesto Domínguez	7
(Hungary) Vilmos Földes	10
(Vietnam) Lương Chí Dũng	10
(Chinese Taipei) Nien Rong-Chih	7
(Philippines) Francisco Bustamante	7
(Germany) Thomas Engert	10
(United States) Charlie Williams	5
(Serbia) Šandor Tot	10
(China) Li Hewen	10
(Chile) Alejandro Carvajal	5
(Finland) Markus Juva	8
(Philippines) Rudy Morta	10
(Germany) Thorsten Hohmann	9
(Canada) Tyler Edey	10
(England) Daryl Peach	7
(Indonesia) Ricky Yang	10
(Chinese Taipei) Liu Cheng-Chuan	10
(United States) Earl Strickland	2
(Chinese Taipei) Lu Hsun-Chen	7
(South Korea) Ryu Seung-woo	10
(Germany) Ralf Souquet	10
(Netherlands) Huidji See	3
(United States) Johnny Archer	6
(Chinese Taipei) Yang Ching-shun	10
(Russia) Konstantin Stepanov	10
(Germany) Oliver Ortmann	6
(Switzerland) Marco Tschudi	10
(Chinese Taipei) Huang Kun-Chang	8
(Philippines) Lee Vann Corteza	10
(England) Imran Majid	4
(Germany) Jörn Kaplan	7
(Spain) David Alcaide	10
(Philippines) Rodolfo Luat	10
(United States) Jeremy Jones	5
(Germany) Andreas Roschkowsky	8
(Indonesia) Roy Apancho	10
(Chinese Taipei) Chao Fong-pang	10
(Philippines) Ramil Gallego	5
(Sweden) Marcus Chamat	7
(Chinese Taipei) Fu Che-wei	10
(England) Steve Davis	10
(Italy) Fabio Petroni	7
(Australia) Lou Condo	7
(Philippines) Jharome Peña	10

Round of 32; 9 November 2006
(Philippines) Ronato Alcano	10
(Philippines) Efren Reyes	7
(Chinese Taipei) Kuo Po-cheng	10
(Philippines) Marlon Manalo	7
(Scotland) Pat Holtz	10
(England) Kevin Uzzell	6
(Chinese Taipei) Wu Jia-qing	10
(Chinese Taipei) W. Hung-hsiang	3
(Chinese Taipei) Lee Kun-fang	8
(Philippines) Jeff De Luna	10
(Hungary) Vilmos Földes	4
(Vietnam) Lương Chí Dũng	10
(Germany) Thomas Engert	6
(Serbia) Šandor Tot	10
(China) Li Hewen	10
(Philippines) Rudy Morta	8
(Canada) Tyler Edey	10
(Indonesia) Ricky Yang	9
(Chinese Taipei) L. Cheng-Chuan	10
(South Korea) Ryu Seung-woo	6
(Germany) Ralf Souquet	10
(Chinese Taipei) Yang Ching-shun	8
(Russia) K. Stepanow	10
(Switzerland) Marco Tschudi	7
(Philippines) Lee Vann Corteza	8
(Spain) David Alcaide	10
(Philippines) Rodolfo Luat	10
(Indonesia) Roy Apancho	6
(Chinese Taipei) Chao Fong-Pang	8
(Chinese Taipei) Fu Che-wei	10
(England) Steve Davis	10
(Philippines) Jharome Peña	8

Round of 16; 10 November 2006
(Philippines) Ronato Alcano	11
(Chinese Taipei) Kuo Po-cheng	5
(Scotland) Pat Holtz	6
(Chinese Taipei) Wu Jia-qing	11
(Philippines) Jeff de Luna	6
(Vietnam) Lương Chí Dũng	11
(Serbia) Šandor Tot	7
(China) Li Hewen	11
(Canada) Tyler Edey	6
(Chinese Taipei) L. Cheng-Chuan	11
(Germany) Ralf Souquet	11
(Russia) K. Stepanow	4
(Spain) David Alcaide	10
(Philippines) Rodolfo Luat	11
(Chinese Taipei) Fu Che-wei	11
(England) Steve Davis	8

Quarter final 11 November 2006
(Philippines) Ronato Alcano	11
(China) Wu Jia-qing	6
(Vietnam) Lương Chí Dũng	7
(China) Li Hewen	11
(Chinese Taipei) Liu Cheng-Chuan	8
(Germany) Ralf Souquet	11
(Philippines) Rodolfo Luat	7
(Chinese Taipei) Fu Che-wei	11

Semi final 11 November 2006
(Philippines) Ronato Alcano	11
(China) Li Hewen	8
(Germany) Ralf Souquet	11
(Chinese Taipei) Fu Che-wei	10

Final; 12 November 2006
(Philippines) Ronato Alcano	17
(Germany) Ralf Souquet	11
