= 2015 World Cup of Pool =

Tournament information
- Venue: York Hall
- City: London
- Country: England
- Organisation: Matchroom Sport
- Format: Single elimination tournament
- Total prize fund: $250,000
- Winner's share: $30,000 each

Final
- Champion: (Chinese Taipei) Ko Pin-yi & Chang Yu-Lung
- Runner-up: (England) Mark Gray & Daryl Peach

The 2015 World Cup of Pool was the tenth edition of the tournament. The event was held in York Hall, London, England, from September 22 to 27. The 2015 event was sponsored by Dafabet.

== Prize fund ==
- Winners (per pair): $60,000
- Runners-up (per pair): $30,000
- Semi-finalists (per pair): $15,000
- Quarter-finalists (per pair): $9,000
- Last 16 losers (per pair): $4,500
- Last 32 losers (per pair): $3,625

== Participating nations ==
- Seeded teams:
  1. England A (Darren Appleton & Karl Boyes)
  2. Philippines (Carlo Biado & Warren Kiamco)
  3. Netherlands (Niels Feijen & Nick van den Berg)
  4. Chinese Taipei (Ko Pin-yi & Chang Yu-Lung)
  5. Austria (Albin Ouschan & Mario He)
  6. USA (Shane Van Boening & Mike Dechaine)
  7. Greece (Nikos Ekonomopoulos & Alexander Kazakis)
  8. China (Li Hewen & Liu Haitao)
  9. Germany (Ralf Souquet & Thorsten Hohmann)
  10. Finland (Mika Immonen & Petri Makkonen)
  11. Spain (Francisco Díaz-Pizarro & Francisco Sánchez Ruiz)
  12. Canada (Jason Klatt & John Morra)
  13. Poland (Mateusz Śniegocki & Wojciech Szewczyk)
  14. Japan (Naoyuki Ōi & Toru Kuribayashi)
  15. England B (Mark Gray & Daryl Peach)
  16. Korea (Jeong Yung Hwa & Ryu Seung-woo)
- Unseeded teams:
  - Australia (Robby Foldvari & Chris Calabrese)
  - Belgium (Serge Das & Olivier Mortier)
  - Czech Republic (Roman Hybler & Michal Gavenciak)
  - Estonia (Denis Grabe & Erki Erm)
  - France (Stephan Cohen & Alex Montpellier)
  - India (Raj Hundal & Amar Kang)
  - Indonesia (Muhammad Simanjuntak & Irsal Nasution)
  - Italy (Danieli Corrieri & Antonio Benvenuto)
  - Malaysia (Ibrahim Bin Amir & Kok Jken Yung)
  - New Zealand (Matt Edwards & Nick Pera)
  - Peru (Cristopher Tevez & Manuel Chau)
  - Qatar (Waleed Majid & Bashar Hussain)
  - Romania (Babken Melkonyan & Ioan Ladanyi)
  - Russia (Ruslan Chinakhov & Konstantin Stepanov)
  - Singapore (Aloysius Yapp & Chan Keng Kwang)
  - Sweden (Marcus Chamat & Christian Sparrenloev-Fischer)

== Tournament bracket ==
Round 1 Race to 7
1	England A	7
Australia	5
16	Korea	7
Malaysia	6
9	Germany	3
Indonesia	7
8	China	4
Romania	7
5	Austria	7
Peru	5
12	Canada	6
France	7
13	Poland	7
New Zealand	3
4	Chinese Taipei	7
Estonia	5
3	Netherlands	7
India	3
14	Japan	7
Italy	3
11	Spain	3
Czech Republic	7
6	USA	5
Qatar	7
7	Greece	5
Singapore	7
10	Finland	7
Belgium	4
15	England B	7
Sweden	4
2	Philippines	7
Russia	4

Round 2 Race to 7
1	England A	7
16	Korea	0
Indonesia	5
Romania	7
5	Austria	7
France	2
13	Poland	3
4	Chinese Taipei	7
3	Netherlands	6
14	Japan	7
Czech Republic	3
Qatar	7
Singapore	4
10	Finland	7
15	England B	7
2	Philippines	4

Quarter-finals; Race to 9
1	England A	9
Romania	3
5	Austria	5
4	Chinese Taipei	9
14	Japan	9
Qatar	4
10	Finland	4
15	England B	9

Semi-finals; Race to 9
1	England A	6
4	Chinese Taipei	9
14	Japan	7
15	England B	9

Final; Race to 10
4	Chinese Taipei	10
15	England B	8
