= 2011 World Cup of Pool =

Tournament information
- Dates: 6–11 September 2011
- Venue: The Block of SM City North EDSA
- City: Quezon City
- Country: Philippines
- Organisation: Matchroom Sport
- Format: Single elimination tournament
- Total prize fund: $250,000
- Winner's share: $30,000 per player

Final
- Champion: (Germany) (Ralf Souquet and Thorsten Hohmann)
- Runner-up: (Thailand) (Nitiwat Kanjanasri and Kobkit Palajin)
- Score: 10–4

The 2011 World Cup of Pool is the sixth edition of the said tournament. For the third straight year, the event is once again being held in the Philippines, at The Block of SM City North EDSA in Quezon City, from 6 to 11 September 2011. The event was won by the German team of Ralf Souquet and Thorsten Hohmann, who defeated Thailand's Nitiwat Kanjanasri and Kobkit Palajin in the final 10–4.

== Rules ==
- Winners' break.
- Teammates take shots alternately.
- Race to eight racks for matches prior to the quarterfinals.
- Race to nine racks for matches from the quarterfinals to the semifinals.
- Race to ten racks for the Final.
- Eighty-second shot clock for the shot immediately after the break, forty seconds for other shots.
- In order for a break to be legal, at least two balls must pass over the head string.

== Prize money ==
Stage	Prize money
Winner	US$60,000
Runner Up	US$30,000
Semi Final	US$16,000
Quarter Final	US$10,000
Second Round	US$5,000
First Round	US$3,000
Total	US$250,000

== Participating nations ==
- Seeded teams:
  1. China (Fu Jianbo and Li Hewen)
  2. Philippines A (Ronato Alcano and Dennis Orcollo)
  3. England (Darren Appleton and Chris Melling)
  4. Germany (Ralf Souquet and Thorsten Hohmann)
  5. Philippines B (Francisco Bustamante and Efren Reyes)
  6. USA (Corey Deuel and Mike Dechaine)
  7. Chinese Taipei (Ko Pin-yi and Ko Ping-chung)
  8. Spain (David Alcaide and Francisco Diaz Pizarro)
  9. Japan (Yukio Akagariyama and Lo Li-wen)
  10. Italy (Bruno Muratore and Fabio Petroni)
  11. Poland (Radosław Babica and Karol Skowerski)
  12. Finland (Mika Immonen and Petri Makkonen)
  13. France (Stephan Cohen and Vincent Facquet)
  14. Netherlands (Huidji See and Marco Teutscher)
  15. Canada (John Morra and Jason Klatt)
  16. Indonesia (Irsal Nasution and Riyan Setiawan)
- Unseeded teams:
  - Australia (Greg Jenkins and David Rothall)
  - Austria (Mario He and Jasmin Ouschan)
  - Croatia (Karlo Dalmatin and Ivica Putnik)
  - Estonia (Dennis Grabe and Erki Erm)
  - Hong Kong (Kenny Kwok and Lee Chenman)
  - India (Raj Hundal and Amar Kang)
  - Korea (Lee Gun-jae and Hwang Young)
  - Kuwait (Khaled Al Mutairi and Omar Al Shaheen)
  - Malaysia (Ibrahim Bin Amir and Patrick Ooi)
  - Malta (Alex Borg and Tony Drago)
  - Russia (Ruslan Chinakhov and Konstantin Stepanov)
  - Singapore (Chan Keng Kwang and Bernard Tey)
  - Sweden (Marcus Chamat and Thomas Mehtala)
  - Switzerland (Dimitri Jungo and Ronnie Regli)
  - Thailand (Nitiwat Kanjanasri and Kobkit Palajin)
  - Vietnam (Lương Chí Dũng and Nguyen Phuc Long)

== Tournament summary ==
=== First round ===
- The first day of the tournament saw 4 seeded teams booted out of the competition, with the defending champions China dethroned by Switzerland, 8–4, and India outlasted the Finnish team led by Mika Immonen in a thriller, 8–7. This is the first time Team India advanced to the Round of 16 of the tournament. Meanwhile, the legendary Filipino duo of Efren Reyes and Francisco Bustamante started the tournament with a win over Kuwait, 8–4.
- The second day was again filled with upsets, with contenders United States, Holland, and England booted out of the competition by Singapore, Thailand, and newcomers Estonia. However, title favorites Germany and Philippines A trashed their respective opponents, defeating Australia (8–0) and Austria (8–2).
- The third day of the competition saw the Taiwanese brother duo of Ko Pin-yi and Ko Ping-chun defeating Russia, 8–4. Poland scored the second whitewash in the tournament, beating Vietnam, 8–0.

=== Second round ===
- On the first match of the second round, Sweden managed to squeaked past Switzerland, 8–6. Then, the duo of Efren Reyes and Francisco Bustamante eliminated India by the score of 8–5.
- The fourth day of the competition saw Germany and Poland continuing on their winning ways as they beat their respective foes, Malaysia and Singapore, by the identical scores of 8–3. Meanwhile, the Taiwanese brother duo of Ko Pin-yi and Ko Ping-chun and Team Philippines A of Dennis Orcollo and Ronato Alcano arranged their own quarterfinals matchup, as they beat Italy and Canada in tight matches by the score of 8-7 and 8–6, respectively.

=== Quarterfinals ===
- The quarterfinals saw the two Filipino teams crashing out of the tournament. Team Philippines B of Efren Reyes and Francisco Bustamante were trashed by the German duo of Ralf Souquet and Thorsten Hohmann by the score of 9–1. Then, Team Philippines A of Dennis Orcollo and Ronato Alcano were defeated by the Taiwanese brother duo of Ko Pin-yi and Ko Ping-chun in a very close match (9–8), with Alcano failing to knock down the 8-ball that would have clinched the victory for the Philippines.
- In other quarterfinal matches, unheralded teams Korea and Thailand moved through the semifinals, defeating Sweden (9–5) and Poland (9–6), respectively.

=== Semifinals ===
- The German duo of Ralf Souquet and Thorsten Hohmann became the first finalist of the tournament, surviving a scare from the Korean team, by the score of 9–7. Afterwards, unheralded Team Thailand moved through the finals, beating Chinese Taipei by the score of 9–3.

=== Finals ===
- The German duo of Ralf Souquet and Thorsten Hohmann, who were playing superbly throughout the tournament, finally clinched their first championship, defeating surprise finalist Thailand by the score of 10–4. They would become the first European team to win the World Cup of Pool.

== Tournament bracket ==
Round 1 Race to 8
1	China	4
Switzerland	8
16	Indonesia	7
Sweden	8
8	Spain	5
Korea	8
9	Japan	8
Croatia	3
5	Philippines	8
Kuwait	4
12	Finland	7
India	8
4	Germany	8
Australia	0
13	France	6
Malaysia	8
3	England	6
Estonia	8
14	Netherlands	4
Thailand	8
6	USA	7
Singapore	8
11	Poland	8
Vietnam	0
7	Chinese Taipei	8
Russia	4
10	Italy	8
Hong Kong	6
2	Philippines	8
Austria	2
15	Canada	8
Malta	4

Round 2 Race to 8
Switzerland	6
Sweden	8
Korea	8
9	Japan	6
5	Philippines	8
India	5
4	Germany	8
Malaysia	3
Estonia	4
Thailand	8
Singapore	3
11	Poland	8
7	Chinese Taipei	8
10	Italy	7
2	Philippines	8
15	Canada	6

Quarter-finals; Race to 9
Sweden	5
Korea	9
5	Philippines	1
4	Germany	9
Thailand	9
11	Poland	6
7	Chinese Taipei	9
2	Philippines	8

Semi-finals; Race to 9
Korea	7
4	Germany	9
Thailand	9
Chinese Taipei	3

Final; Race to 10
4	Germany	10
Thailand	4
