= 2009 World Cup of Pool =

Professional pairs nine-ball tournament, held September 2009

Tournament information
- Dates: 1–6 September 2009
- Venue: The Annex of SM City North EDSA
- City: Quezon City
- Country: Philippines
- Organisation: Matchroom Sport
- Format: Single elimination tournament
- Total prize fund: $250,000
- Winner's share: $30,000 per player

Final
- Champion: Philippines B (Francisco Bustamante and Efren Reyes)
- Runner-up: Germany (Ralf Souquet and Thorsten Hohmann)
- Score: 11–9

The 2009 World Cup of Pool (also known as the 2009 PartyPoker World Cup of Pool due to sponsorship) was a professional nine-ball pool, and the fourth World Cup of Pool, a scotch doubles knockout championship representing 32 national teams. The cup was played at the Annex of SM City North EDSA in Quezon City, Philippines from 1 to 6 September 2009. The Korean pair of Ga Young Kim and Yun Mi Lim were the first all-female team to participate at the event. The tournament featured a prize fund of $250,000 with the winner receiving $60,000. It was sponsored by online poker website partypoker.

The defending champions were Rodney Morris and Shane Van Boening representing the US, who had won the 2008 event 11–7 over the English team of Daryl Peach and Mark Gray in the final. The USA team were defeated in the quarter-finals by the Chinese pair of Fu Jianbo and Li Hewen 5–9. The event was won by the Filipino team of Francisco Bustamante and Efren Reyes, who defeated the Germans Ralf Souquet and Thorsten Hohmann in the 2009 final 11–9. The event was organised and later broadcast by Matchroom Sport worldwide, and locally live on Solar Sports and CS9.

== Tournament format ==
The 2009 World Cup of Pool was a pairs nine-ball tournament played at the Annex of SM City North EDSA in Quezon City, Philippines. The tournament was played between 1–6 September 2009 as scotch doubles, with players taking shots alternatively. Matches were played as a race-to-eight racks until the quarter-finals, which were race-to-nine along with the semi-finals, and the final was a race-to-11 racks. The tournament was a single elimination bracket, consisting of 32 teams. Of the 32 teams, 16 were seeded; whilst 16 were unseeded.

The defending champions were the USA team of Rodney Morris and Shane Van Boening who defeated Dennis Orcollo and Francisco Bustamante in the final of the 2008 event. The two other previous winners of the event also participated. The event was sponsored by online poker website partypoker, and organised by Matchroom Sport. The tournament was broadcast live locally on Solar Sports and CS9 and 31 one-hour episode were produced by Matchroom Sport broadcast worldwide.

=== Prize fund ===
Prize money for the event featured $250,000 with $60,000 being awarded to the winning team. This was similar to that of the previous year's event. Money earned by the team was shared between their players. A breakdown of prize money is shown below:

Stage	Prize money
Winner	$60,000
Runner-up	$30,000
Semi-final	$16,000
Quarter-final	$10,000
Second round	$5,000
First round	$3,000
Total	$250,000

=== Teams ===
Participating nations for the event were announced on 31 July 2009, with 31 countries participating and two teams representing the host nation Philippines. The teams were announced on 14 August with all three prior winners of the competition participating. An all-female team, representing Korea, competed at the event for the first time. The teams are listed below:

- Seeded teams:
  1. USA (Rodney Morris and Shane Van Boening)
  2. Philippines A (Ronato Alcano and Dennis Orcollo)
  3. Germany (Ralf Souquet and Thorsten Hohmann)
  4. England (Darren Appleton and Imran Majid)
  5. Philippines B (Francisco Bustamante and Efren Reyes)
  6. Holland (Niels Feijen and Nick van den Berg)
  7. Taiwan (Lai Chia-Hsiung and Yang Ching-shun)
  8. Finland (Mika Immonen and Markus Juva)
  9. China (Fu Jianbo and Li Hewen)
  10. Poland (Radosław Babica and Mateusz Śniegocki)
  11. Japan (Hayato Hijikata and Satoshi Kawabata)
  12. Italy (Bruno Muratore and Fabio Petroni)
  13. Spain (David Alcaide and Rafael Guzman)
  14. Canada (Tyler Edey and Jason Klatt)
  15. Russia (Ruslan Chinakhov and Konstantin Stepanov)
  16. India (Raj Hundal and Dharminder Singh Lilly)
- Unseeded teams:
  - Australia (Lou Condo and Greg Jenkins)
  - Austria (Martin Kempter and Jasmin Ouschan)
  - Belgium (Pascal Budo and Serge Das)
  - Croatia (Philipp Stojanovic and Ivica Putnik)
  - Denmark (Kasper Kristoffersen and Bahram Lotfy)
  - France (Stephan Cohen and Vincent Facquet)
  - Hong Kong (Kenny Kwok and Lee Chenman)
  - Indonesia (Muhammad Bewi Simanjuntak and Muhammad Zulfikri)
  - Korea (Ga-Young Kim and Yun-Mi Lim)
  - Malaysia (Ibrahim Bin Amir and Lee Poh Soon)
  - Malta (Alex Borg and Tony Drago)
  - Qatar (Bashar Hussain and Mohammed Ali Bin Ali)
  - Singapore (Chan Keng Kwang and Toh Lian Han)
  - Sweden (Marcus Chamat and Tom Storm)
  - Thailand (Nitiwat Kanjanasri and Surethep Phoochalam)
  - Vietnam (Lương Chí Dũng and Nguyen Thanh Nam)

== Tournament summary ==
=== Early rounds ===
The tournament began on 1 September 2009, with the first round played until 3 September. The opening match of the tournament saw the French pair of Stephan Cohen and Vincent Facquet take an 8–1 victory over the Canadian team. The first two rounds were played as a race-to-eight-racks. The defending champion USA duo of Rodney Morris and Shane Van Boening met the Maltese team of Alex Borg and Tony Drago in the opening match. The match was tied at 7–7, but a dry break by Drago allowed the USA team to win 8–7. The unseeded Indonesian pair won their opening round match over the Indian team 8–3 to draw the US in the second round.

An all-female team competed for the first time at the event, with the Koreans Ga Young Kim and Yun Mi Lim. The pair led 3–0 before being defeated 5–8 by the ninth seed and 2007 championship winning team of Li Hewen and Fu Jianbo from China, who won six racks in-a-row. The Filipino A side of Ronato Alcano and Dennis Orcollo won their match against the Thai team 8–5, despite trailing 4–5.

Japan were trailing 3–6 behind in their match against Croatia, before winning six straight racks to win 8–6. German Thorsten Hohmann commented that he would want to play with his partner Ralf Souquet above any other player after his first round match. The team defeated the Hong Kong duo of Kenny Kwok and Lee Chenman in a whitewash 8–0. Mika Immonen and Markus Juva, the 2007 runners-up Finland played Sweden in the first round. The Finnish team won 8–3 over Tom Storm and Marcus Chamat.

The second round was played from 4 to 5 September. Thirteenth seed Spain played the fourth seed English side of Darren Appleton and Imran Majid. In the 13th rack, with the match tied at 6–6, David Alcaide called a foul on himself that neither the referee or the English side had seen. The English side won this, and the next rack to win 8–6 and eliminate the Spanish team. Following the match the reigning ten-ball world championship winner Darren Appleton called Alcaide a "great sportsman".

The Philippine B side played the Italian team in the second round. The Italian team were trailing at 4–6, when referee Cielo Lopez deemed that the hair on Bruno Muratore's left arm had touched the cue ball. Later television replays were inconclusive if the foul was justified. The Italian team won only one more rack and were defeated 5–8. The Philippine A side of Orcollo and Alcano won eight straight racks after trailing 0–3 to the Russians to win 8–3. Russia's Ruslan Chinakhov was only 17 years old; but missed some "crucial shots" during the match.

=== Later rounds (quarter-final—final) ===
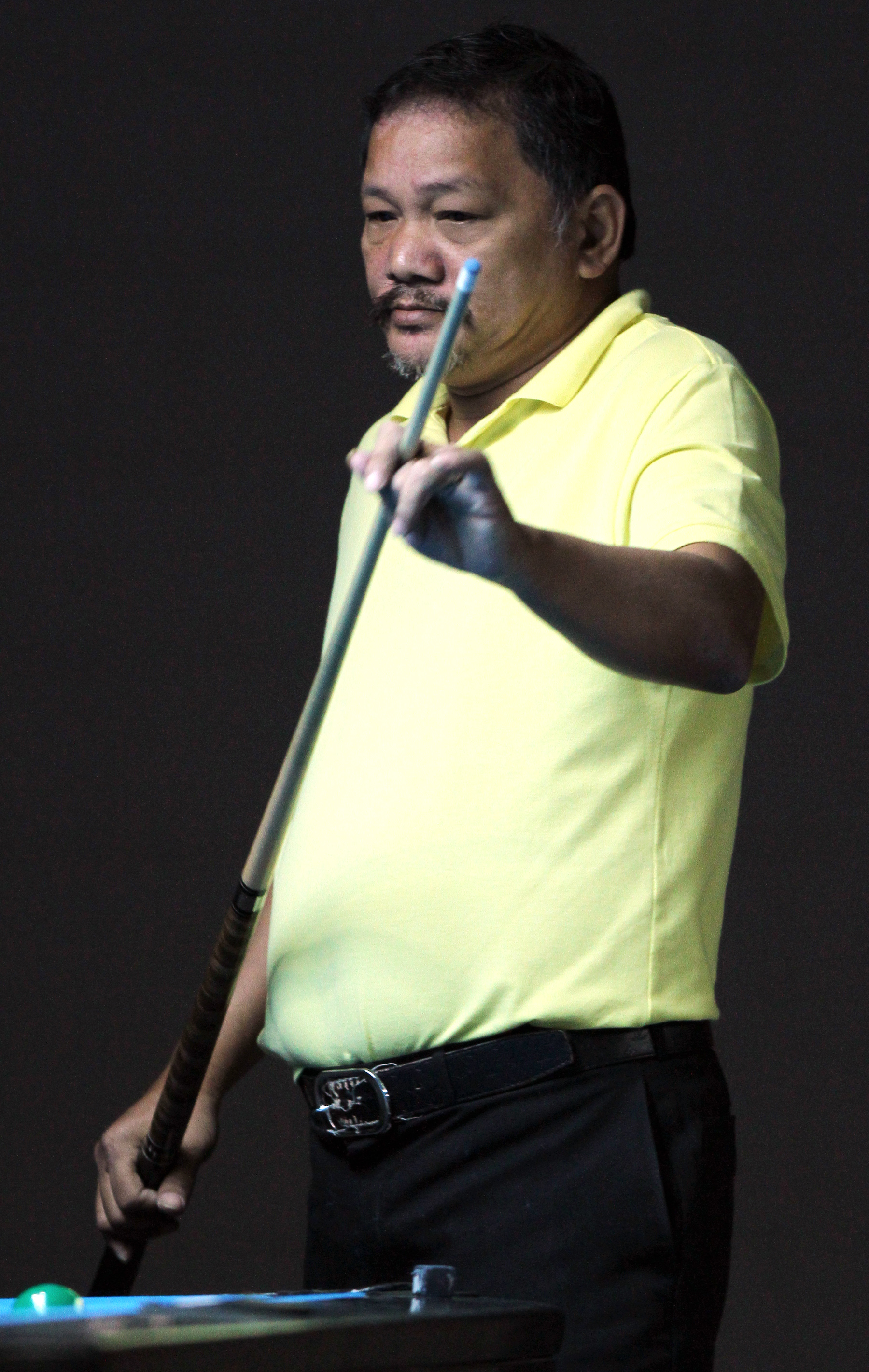
Efren Reyes (pictured) and Francisco Bustamante won the tournament with an 11–9 victory in the final.

The quarter-finals were all played on 5 September as a race-to-nine racks. Both home Philippines teams reached the quarter-finals. Alcano and Orcollo defeated the Polish team of Radosław Babica and Mateusz Śniegocki. The Philippines trailed at both 0–2 and 4–2 before eventually winning 9–5. The other Filipino team played the English side, who won only one rack, when trailing by three racks, and eventually lost 1–9. Rodney Morris and Shane Van Boening, the defending champions, were defeated by the Chinese team. China were 1–3 behind, but won seven racks in a row, and eventually won 9–5. The final quarter-final featured the German team of Ralf Souquet and Thorsten Hohmann defeating the Netherlands duo of Niels Feijen and Nick van den Berg 9–7.

The semi-finals were played on 6 September, as race-to-nine racks matches. The first semi-final, the Chinese and Filipino teams were at hill-hill 8–8. In the deciding rack, the Chinese team had the break, but Fu missed a two-ball combination on the second shot. The Filipino team of Reyes and Bustamante ran the rest of the rack to win 9–8. The second semi-final featured the other Philippine team face the Germans. The German team prevented an all home-nation final, winning 9–6.

The final was also played on 6 September as a race-to-11 racks match. Germany won the lag and broke first, but failed to win any of the first three racks. The German team won five straight racks to lead 5–3, before the Philippines tied the match 6–6. Rack 14 was a long rack, with a prolonged bout of safety play with Reyes and Bustamante both missing long pots. Souquet himself converted a long shot at the 9-ball to put the Germans up 8–6. The Filipino team won four of the next five racks to get to the hill at 10–9 ahead. The Filipino team won the next rack to win the match 11–9 and the tournament.

== Results ==
Below is the results from the event. Teams in bold denote match winners. Numbers to the left of teams represents the team's seedings.

Round 1 Race to 8
1	**USA**	**8**
Malta	7
16	India	3
**Indonesia**	**8**
9	**China**	**8**
Korea	5
8	**Finland**	**8**
Sweden	3
5	**Philippines B**	**8**
Qatar	3
12	**Italy**	**8**
Austria	5
13	**Spain**	**8**
Australia	3
4	**England**	**8**
Malaysia	4
3	**Germany**	**8**
Hong Kong	0
14	Canada	1
**France**	**8**
11	**Japan**	**8**
Croatia	6
9	**Netherlands**	**8**
Vietnam	3
7	**Taiwan**	**8**
Singapore	6
10	**Poland**	**8**
Belgium	0
15	**Russia**	**8**
Denmark	3
2	**Philippines A**	**8**
Thailand	5

Round 2 Race to 8
1	**USA**	**8**
Indonesia	5
9	**China**	**8**
8	Finland	3
5	**Philippines B**	**8**
12	Italy	5
13	Spain	6
4	**England**	**8**
3	**Germany**	**8**
France	4
11	Japan	4
6	**Netherlands**	**8**
7	Taiwan	5
10	**Poland**	**8**
15	Russia	3
2	**Philippines A**	**8**

Quarter-finals; Race to 9
1	USA	5
9	**China**	**9**
5	**Philippines B**	**9**
4	England	1
3	**Germany**	**9**
6	Netherlands	7
10	Poland	5
2	**Philippines A**	**9**

Semi-finals; Race to 9
9	China	8
5	**Philippines B**	**9**
3	**Germany**	**9**
2	Philippines A	6

Final; Race to 11
5	**Philippines B**	**11**
3	Germany	9
