= 2021 World Cup of Pool =

Pool Tournament

2021 World Cup of Pool XIV
Tournament information
- Dates: 9–14 May 2021
- Venue: Stadium MK
- City: Milton Keynes
- Country: England
- Organisation: Matchroom Sport
- Total prize fund: $250,000
- Winner's share: $60,000

The 2021 World Cup of Pool was a professional pool doubles tournament, and the 14th edition of the World Cup of Pool. The event was contested by 32 pairs representing different nations, and took place at the Stadium MK in Milton Keynes, England, from 9 to 14 May 2021.

The Austrian team of Mario He and Albin Ouschan were defending their 2019 title, but were knocked out in the first round by the Slovak team of Jakub Koniar & Jaroslav Polách.

== Prize fund ==
The total prize money for the event:

- Winners (per pair): $60,000
- Runners-up (per pair): $30,000
- Semi-finalists (per pair): $15,000
- Quarter-finalists (per pair): $9,000
- Last 16 losers (per pair): $4,500
- Last 32 losers (per pair): $3,625

== Teams ==
Each competing nation features two players, with the hosts, Great Britain, receiving three places (one being a last minute replacement for the Canadian pairing who were forced to withdraw due to travel issues). Also the Albanian pairing was replaced by France due to travel issues. The competing teams were made of the players below:

- Justin Sajich & Ivan Li (AUS)
- Mario He & Albin Ouschan (AUT)
- Marharyta Fjafilawa & Yana Halliday (BLR)
- Serge Das & Kevin Lannoye (BEL)
- Sanjin Pehlivanović & Ajdin Piknjač (BIH)
- Philipp Stojanović & Roberto Bartol (CRO)
- Petr Urban & Michal Gavenčiak (CZE)
- Mickey Krause & Bahram Lotfy (DEN)
- Denis Grabe & Mark Mägi (EST)
- Petri Makkonen & Casper Matikainen (FIN)
- Alex Montpellier & Alain Da Costa (FRA)
- Joshua Filler & Christoph Reintjes (GER)
- Jayson Shaw & Chris Melling (GBR) A
- Kelly Fisher & Allison Fisher (GBR) B
- Darren Appleton & Karl Boyes (GBR) C
- Alexander Kazakis & Nick Malai (GRE)
- Olivér Szolnoki & Vilmos Földes (HUN)
- Zophonias Árnason & Magnús Árnason (ISL)
- Fabio Petroni & Daniele Corrieri (ITA)
- Naoyuki Ōi & Masato Yoshioka (JPN)
- Omar Al-Shaheen & Bader Alawadhi (KUW)
- Pijus Labutis & Kęstutis Žadeikis (LTU)
- Niels Feijen & Marc Bijsterbosch (NED)
- Jeff de Luna & Roberto Gomez (PHL)
- Mieszko Fortuński & Wojciech Szewczyk (POL)
- Fedor Gorst & Sergey Lutsker (RUS)
- Aleksa Pecelj & Andreja Klasović (SRB)
- Jakub Koniar & Jaroslav Polách (SVK)
- Richard Halliday & JJ Faul (RSA)
- David Alcaide & Francisco Sánchez Ruiz (ESP)
- Ronald Regli & Dimitri Jungo (SUI)
- Billy Thorpe & Skyler Woodward (USA)

== Tournament bracket ==
Round 1 Race to 7
1	Austria	1
32	Slovakia	7
17	Hungary	4
16	Czech Republic	7
9	Russia	7
24	Switzerland	4
25	Croatia	1
8	Japan	7
5	Great Britain C	7
28	South Africa	5
21	Serbia	2
12	Greece	7
13	Finland	7
20	Iceland	0
29	Bosnia and Herzegovina	4
4	Netherlands	7
3	Spain	4
30	Italy	7
19	Denmark	7
14	France	2
11	Germany	7
22	Lithuania	4
27	Kuwait	7
6	Poland	3
7	United States	7
26	Australia	2
23	Great Britain B	3
10	Philippines	7
15	Estonia	7
18	Belgium	5
31	Belarus	4
2	Great Britain A	7

Round 2 Race to 7
32	Slovakia	7
16	Czech Republic	6
9	Russia	2
8	Japan	7
5	Great Britain C	7
12	Greece	4
13	Finland	1
4	Netherlands	7
30	Italy	5
19	Denmark	7
11	Germany	7
27	Kuwait	4
7	United States	5
10	Philippines	7
15	Estonia	7
2	Great Britain A	6

Quarter-finals; Race to 9
32	Slovakia	9
8	Japan	8
5	Great Britain C	9
4	Netherlands	1
19	Denmark	5
11	Germany	9
10	Philippines	4
15	Estonia	9

Semi-finals; Race to 9
32	Slovakia	0
5	Great Britain C	9
11	Germany	9
15	Estonia	7

Final; Race to 11
5	Great Britain C	7
11	Germany	11
