= 2007 World Cup of Pool =

Doubles pool competition, played August 2007

2007 Partypoker.com World Cup of Pool
Tournament information
- Dates: 25–30 September 2007
- Venue: Outland club
- City: Rotterdam
- Country: Netherlands
- Organisation: Matchroom Sport
- Format: Single-elimination
- Total prize fund: $250,000
- Winner's share: $30,000 per player

Final
- Champion: (China) Li Hewen and Fu Jianbo
- Runner-up: (Finland) Mika Immonen and Markus Juva
- Score: 11–10

The 2007 World Cup of Pool (also known as the 2007 PartyPoker.com World Cup of Pool for the purposes of sponsorship) was a professional nine-ball pool competition and the second edition of the World Cup of Pool, a scotch doubles knockout championship representing 32 national teams. The event was held in the Outland club in Rotterdam, Netherlands, from 25 to 30 September 2007. The event was held as a single-elimination tournament for a total prize fund of $250,000, including $60,000 for the winner. The tournament was organised by Matchroom Sport, sponsored by poker website Partypoker, and broadcast across 31 one-hour episodes.

The defending champions were the Filipino team of Efren Reyes and Francisco Bustamante, who had defeated the USA pair of Rodney Morris and Earl Strickland in the final of the 2006 event. The Philippines were eliminated in the semi-finals by the Chinese team of Li Hewen and Fu Jianbo. In the final, the Chinese pair defeated Mika Immonen and Markus Juva from Finland on a deciding rack 11–10.

== Format ==
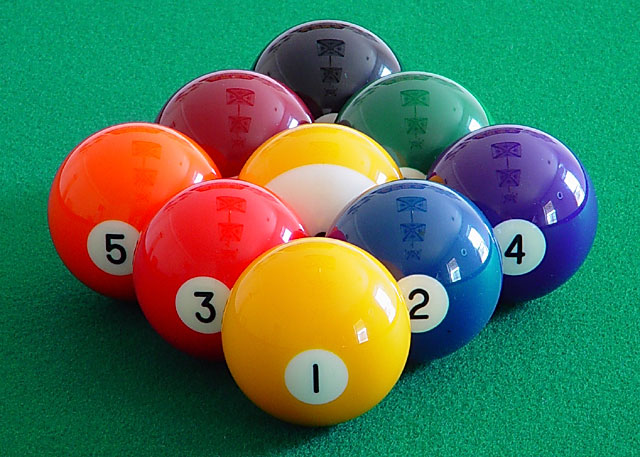
nine-ball rack

The 2007 World Cup of Pool (also known as the 2007 PartyPoker.com World Cup of Pool) for the purposes of sponsorship was a pairs nine-ball tournament played at the Outland nightclub in Rotterdam, Netherlands. The tournament was played between 25 and 30 September 2007 as scotch doubles, the players taking shots alternately. Matches in the opening two rounds were played as a race-to-eight racks and then as a race-to-nine racks until the final, which was played as a race-to-thirteen. The tournament was a single-elimination bracket, consisting of 32 teams. The event was played with winner breaks system, as opposed to the alternative breaks format used in the inaugural event. It was the second World Cup of Pool event, sponsored by Partypoker, and created by Matchroom Sport. The event would see 16 seeded and 16 unseeded teams of two play alternating shots in a scotch doubles style. The defending champions were Efren Reyes and Francisco Bustamante representing the Philippines, who had defeated the USA team of Earl Strickland and Rodney Morris in the 2006 final 13–5.

The event was filmed and broadcast by Matchroom Sport across 31 single hour programs. In the United Kingdom and Ireland, it was broadcast on Sky TV with additional commentary by Phil Yates and Jim Wych. Local highlights were shown on SBS6 in the Netherlands, and on Fox Net in the United States. The programs were broadcast on IKO Kábeltévé in Serbia, Romania, Slovakia and Czech Republic; 7 TV in Russia; CC-TV in China; Fox Australia in Australia; Measat in Malaysia; Measat Indo in Indonesia; NEO Sports in India; Rogers Sportsnet in Canada; Solar Entertainment in the Philippines; Sport 1 in Hungary and Videoland in Taiwan.

=== Prize fund ===
Prize money for the event featured $250,000 with $60,000 being awarded to the winning team. Money earned by the team was shared between their players. A breakdown of prize money is shown below:

Stage	Prize money
Winner	$60,000
Runner-up	$30,000
Semi-final	$16,000
Quarter-final	$10,000
Second round	$5,000
First round	$3,000
Total	$250,000

=== Teams ===
The field consisted of 32 teams, the Netherlands having two teams as hosts. The Malaysian team withdrew from the event, and was replaced with Serge Das and Noel Bruynooghe representing Belgium. The teams were:

- Philippines (Efren Reyes and Francisco Bustamante) (1)
- United States (Rodney Morris and Corey Deuel) (2)
- Taiwan (Wu Jia-qing and Yang Ching-shun) (3)
- Germany (Oliver Ortmann and Christian Reimering) (4)
- Netherlands A (Niels Feijen and Nick van den Berg) (5)
- Vietnam (Nguyen Thanh Nam and Lương Chí Dũng) (6)
- England (Daryl Peach and Imran Majid) (7)
- China (Li Hewen and Fu Jianbo) (8)
- Italy (Fabio Petroni and Bruno Muratore) (9)
- Finland (Mika Immonen and Markus Juva) (10)
- Canada (Edwin Montal and Alain Martel) (11)
- Spain (David Alcaide and Antonio Fazanes) (12)
- Austria (Martin Kempter and Albin Ouschan) (13)
- Belgium (Serge Das and Noel Bruynooghe) (Replaced Malaysia) (14)
- Switzerland (Dimitri Jungo and Marco Tschudi) (15)
- Russia (Konstantin Stepanov and Ruslan Chinakhov) (16)
- ~~Malaysia (Patrick Ooi and Ibrahim Bin Amir)~~ (Withdrew)
- Australia (Stuart Lawler and Shaun Budd)
- Croatia (Philipp Stojanovic and Ivica Putnik)
- Denmark (Bahram Lotfy and Kasper Kristoffersen)
- France (Stephan Cohen and Vincent Facquet)
- Hungary (Vilmos Foldes and Balazs Miko)
- India (Dharminder Singh Lilly and Manan Chandra)
- Indonesia (Ricky Yang and Muhammed Zulfikri)
- Japan (Naoyuki Ōi and Satoshi Kawabata)
- Korea (Woong-Dae Kim and Ryu Seung-woo)
- Malta (Tony Drago and Alex Borg)
- Netherlands B (Alex Lely and Rico Diks)
- Poland (Radosław Babica and Mateusz Śniegocki)
- Qatar (Bashar Hussain and Fahad Ahmed Al Mohammadi)
- Scotland (Pat Holtz and Michael Valentine)
- Singapore (Chan Keng Kwang and Toh Lian Han)
- South Africa (Juan de Beer and Clinton Rossouw)

== Summary ==
The first round of the event was played from 25 to 27 September as a race-to-eight racks. Before the event, the Malaysian team of Patrick Ooi and Ibrahim Bin Amir withdrew from the event, due to "unforeseen circumstances", and were replaced by a Belgian pair of Serge Das and Noel Bruynooghe. The pair met the Dutch B team and won six racks in a row to win the match over the Dutch 8–2. The 16th seeded Russian pair of Ruslan Chinakhov and European number one Konstantin Stepanov were defeated by the Croatian team of Philipp Stojanovic and Ivica Putnik in the opening round 5–8. The Japanese team of Naoyuki Ōi and Satoshi Kawabata won 8–2 over David Alcaide and Antonio Fazane from Spain despite dropping the opening rack. Lương Chí Dũng and Thanh Nam Nguyen representing Vietnam had made the semi-finals in the inaugural event, but were defeated by the South Korean team 5–8, despite being 5–3 ahead. The English team of Imran Majid and Daryl Peach came from 3–6 behind to defeat the Polish side of Radosław Babica and Mateusz Śniegocki 8–6. There was only one match in the first round that went to a deciding rack, as the 2006 finalists USA team won 8–7 over Malta having taken the last four racks.

The second round was played on 27 to 29 September as a race to eight racks. Japan played the sole remaining Dutch team in the second round, and having trailed 6–7, took the final two racks to win 8–7. The Switzerland team trailed 5–2 behind the US, but recovered to tie at 6–6 before winning the match 8–6. The USA pair were wearing orange shirts, the traditional colour of the Netherlands, after both Dutch teams had been eliminated. The Belgian team, composed of Bruynooghe and Das who were ranked 46th and 60th in Europe, defeated 2005 WPA World Nine-ball Championship winner Wu Jia-qing and world championship semi-finalist Yang Ching-shun from Taiwan 8–6. The defending champion Filipino team completed a 8–0 whitewash over the Croatians. France and China were tied at 5–5 before Vincent Faquet completed a run out to lead 6–5. During the next two racks, the French failed to escape from snookers allowing the Chinese team of Li Hewen and Fu Jianbo to win them before they broke and ran rack 13 for victory. The Singapore team also defeated Austria 8–2, for all four quarter-finalists in the top half coming from Asia.

The quarter-finals were played on 29 September as a race to nine racks. Japan defeated Singapore 9–5 in the first quarter-final, making jokes throughout the match to the crowd. In rack 10, Ōi made a three ball combination to pot the 9-ball on the first shot after the break, both players jumping up and down in celebration after the shot. Having defeated the Taiwan team in the second round, the Belgian duo were "drained" according to reporters, and were only able to win four racks against Canada. The Filipino pair were defeated by the Chinese team 6–9. The Chinese team took an early four rack lead, but their lead was reduced to 7–6. In rack 14, Reyes missed a simple shot on the 6-ball, and China won the rack, before running rack 15. The last quarter-final saw Finland's Mika Immonen and Markus Juva defeat Switzerland 9–4.

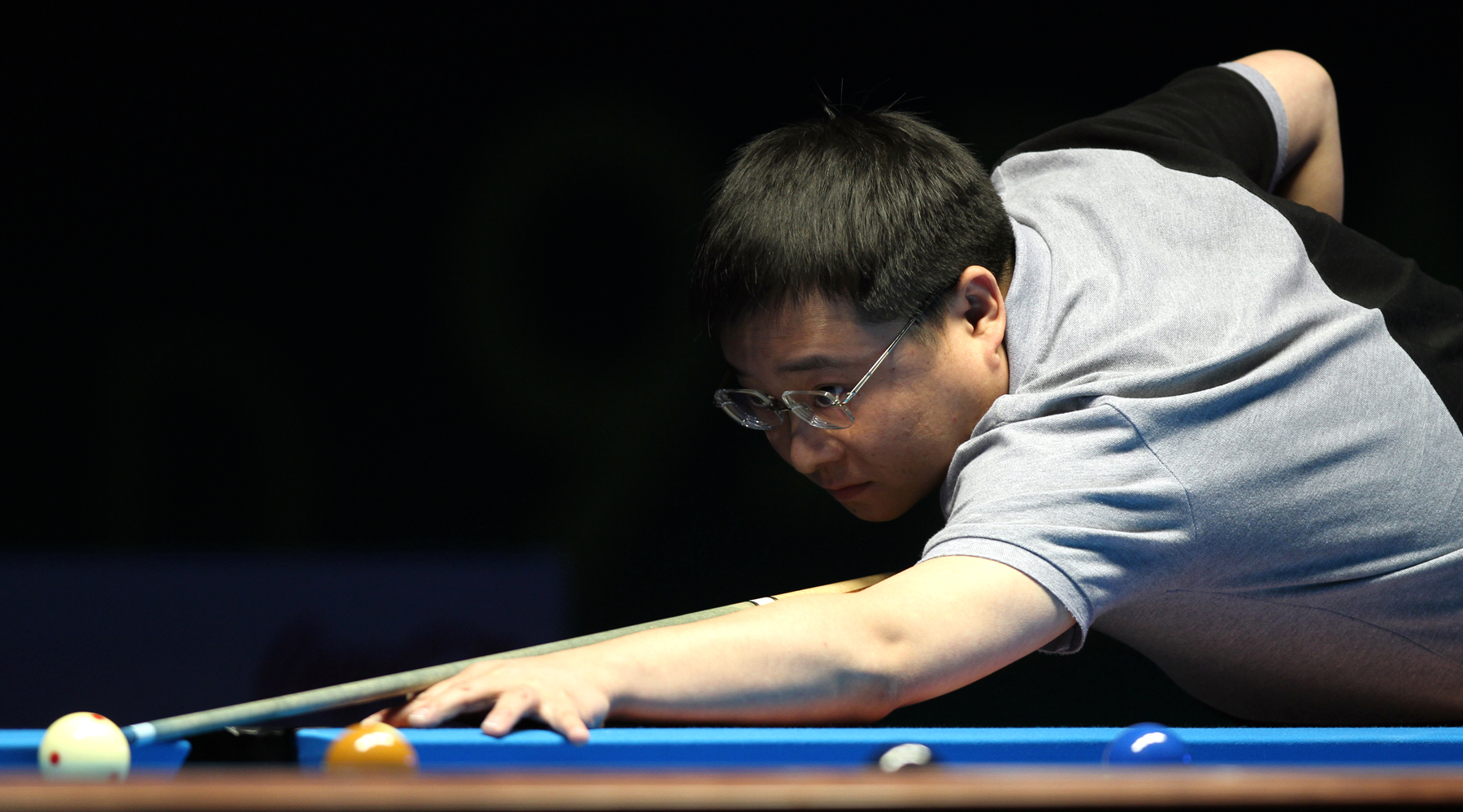
Li Hewen (pictured in 2012) alongside Fu Jianbo won the event with a 11–10 win over Finland

The semi-finals were played on 30 September as a race to nine racks. The first semi-final saw the 10th seeded Finland play the 11th seeded Canadian team. Finland won the lag, but made a dry break in the opening rack. They still won the opening rack, and retained the break throughout the match as they won 9–0. The Canadian team only played nine shots in the entire match. The other semi-final match was played between China, seeded 8th, and the unseeded Japanese team. The Chinese team ran the first two racks, before three players missed a shot at the 9-ball in rack three; Hewen finally potted to increase the lead to 3–0. China then won four of the next five racks to lead 7–1. Hewen missed a shot on the 2-ball the following rack allowing Japan to the table, who won the next three racks. China capitalised on a missed bank shot to win the next two racks, and complete a 9–4 victory.

The final was also played on 30 September, but as a race-to-11 racks. The Chinese team of Hewen and Jianbo met the Finland pair of Juva and Immonen. The final had many dry breaks, six in the first 15 racks, there having been just ten in the rest of the tournament. There was just one rack between the two sides until China led 6–4 and then 7–5. China won three of the next four to go to the hill, leading 10–6. The Finland team then won four straight frames to level the match at 10–10. At the table in the deciding rack, Immonen potted a ball from the break, and left a combination shot for Juva to pot the 9-ball to win the tournament; the shot did not come off, and the Chinese pair ran the rest of the rack to win the tournament.

== Main draw ==
Below are the results from the event. Teams in bold denote match winners. Numbers to the left of teams represents the team's seedings.

Round of 32; Race to 8
1	**Philippines**	**8**
Scotland	6
16	Russia	5
**Croatia**	**8**
9	Italy	2
**France**	**8**
8	**China**	**8**
South Africa	1
5	**Netherlands A**	**8**
Indonesia	5
12	Spain	2
**Japan**	**8**
13	**Austria**	**8**
Australia	5
4	Germany	4
**Singapore**	**8**
3	**(Chinese Taipei) Taiwan**	**8**
Denmark	3
14	**Belgium**	**8**
Netherlands B	2
11	**Canada**	**8**
India	3
6	Vietnam	5
**South Korea**	**8**
7	**England**	**8**
Poland	6
10	**Finland**	**8**
Qatar	5
15	**Switzerland**	**8**
Hungary	5
2	**United States**	**8**
Malta	7

Round of 16; Race to 8
1	**Philippines**	**8**
Croatia	0
France	6
**8**	**China**	**8**
5	Netherlands A	7
**Japan**	**8**
13	Austria	2
**Singapore**	**8**
3	(Chinese Taipei) Taiwan	6
**Belgium**	**8**
11	**Canada**	**8**
South Korea	2
7	England	5
10	**Finland**	**8**
15	**Switzerland**	**8**
2	United States	6

Quarter-finals; Race to 9
1	Philippines	6
8	**China**	**9**
**Japan**	**9**
Singapore	5
Belgium	4
11	**Canada**	**9**
10	**Finland**	**9**
15	Switzerland	4

Semi-finals; Race to 9
8	**China**	**9**
Japan	4
11	Canada	0
10	**Finland**	**9**

Final; Race to 11
8	**China**	**11**
10	Finland	10
