= 2014 World Cup of Pool =

Tournament information
- Dates: 23–28 September 2014
- Venue: Mountbatten Centre
- City: Portsmouth
- Country: England
- Organisation: Matchroom Sport
- Format: Single Elimination
- Total prize fund: $250,000
- Winner's share: $30,000 per player

Final
- Champion: (England) A (Darren Appleton & Karl Boyes)
- Runner-up: (Netherlands) (Niels Feijen & Nick van den Berg)
- Score: 10–9

The 2014 World Cup of Pool was the ninth edition of the tournament. The event was once again held in England, this time at the Mountbatten Centre, Portsmouth, from 23 to 28 September. The 2014 event was sponsored by Betway.

== Prize fund ==
- Winners (per pair): $60,000
- Runners-up (per pair): $30,000
- Semi-finalists (per pair): $16,000
- Quarter-finalists (per pair): $10,000
- Last 16 losers (per pair): $5,000
- Last 32 losers (per pair): $3,000

== Participating nations ==
- Seeded teams:
  1. Philippines (Dennis Orcollo & Lee Vann Corteza)
  2. Netherlands (Niels Feijen & Nick van den Berg)
  3. China (Wang Can & Dang Jinhu)
  4. England A (Darren Appleton & Karl Boyes)
  5. USA (Shane Van Boening & Earl Strickland)
  6. Chinese Taipei (Chang Yu-lung & Hsu Kai Lun)
  7. Germany (Ralf Souquet & Thorsten Hohmann)
  8. Finland (Mika Immonen & Petri Makkonen)
  9. Poland (Karol Skowerski & Mateusz Śniegocki)
  10. Canada (Alex Pagulayan & John Morra)
  11. Austria (Albin Ouschan & Mario He)
  12. Japan (Hayato Hijikata & Masaaki Tanaka)
  13. Greece (Nikos Ekonomopoulos & Alexander Kazakis)
  14. England B (Daryl Peach & Chris Melling)
  15. Belgium (Serge Das & Olivier Mortier)
  16. Italy (Fabio Petroni & Daniele Corrieri)
- Unseeded teams:
  - Australia (Phil Reilly & James Georgiadis)
  - Chile (Alejandro Carvajal & Enrique Rojas)
  - Croatia (Ivica Putnik & Karlo Dalmatin)
  - Czech Republic (Roman Hybler & Michal Gavenciak)
  - France (Stephan Cohen & Alex Montpelier)
  - India (Raj Hundal & Amar Kang)
  - Indonesia (Irsal Nasution & Muhammad Zulfikri)
  - Korea (Jeong Yung Hwa & Ha Minuk)
  - Malaysia (Ibrahim Amir & Alan Tan)
  - Malta (Tony Drago & Alex Borg)
  - Portugal (Manuel Gama & Guilherme Sousa)
  - Qatar (Waleed Majid & Bashar Hussain)
  - Russia (Konstantin Stepanov & Ruslan Chinakhov)
  - Spain (David Alcaide & Francisco Díaz-Pizarro)
  - Sweden (Andreas Gerwen & Tomas Larsson)
  - Switzerland (Dimitri Jungo & Ronni Regli)

== Tournament bracket ==
Round 1 Race to 7
1	Philippines	7
Chile	5
16	Italy	4
France	7
8	Finland	7
Korea	0
9	Poland	7
Australia	4
5	USA	7
Croatia	2
12	Japan	6
Russia	7
4	England A	7
Spain	6
13	Greece	7
Indonesia	6
3	China	7
Czech Republic	5
14	England B	7
India	6
6	Chinese Taipei	5
Qatar	7
11	Austria	7
Portugal	2
7	Germany	7
Malaysia	1
10	Canada	7
Malta	1
2	Netherlands	7
Sweden	3
15	Belgium	3
Switzerland	7

Round 2 Race to 7
1	Philippines	7
France	5
8	Finland	7
9	Poland	0
5	USA	7
Russia	5
4	England A	7
13	Greece	1
3	China	7
14	England B	0
Qatar	5
11	Austria	7
7	Germany	7
10	Canada	6
2	Netherlands	7
Switzerland	4

Quarter-finals; Race to 9
1	Philippines	7
8	Finland	9
5	USA	7
4	England A	9
3	China	3
11	Austria	9
7	Germany	7
2	Netherlands	9

Semi-finals; Race to 9
8	Finland	6
4	England A	9
11	Austria	1
2	Netherlands	9

Final; Race to 10
4	England A	10
2	Netherlands	9
