= 2010 World Cup of Pool =

2010 pool championship in the Philippines

Tournament information
- Dates: 7–12 September 2010
- Venue: Robinsons Place Manila
- City: Manila
- Country: Philippines
- Organisation: Matchroom Sport
- Format: Single elimination tournament
- Total prize fund: $250,000
- Winner's share: $30,000 per player

Final
- Champion: (China) (Fu Jianbo and Li Hewen)
- Runner-up: (Philippines) B (Roberto Gomez and Dennis Orcollo)
- Score: 10–8

The 2010 World Cup of Pool was the fifth World Cup of Pool championship. It was held at the Robinsons Place Manila in Manila, Philippines, from September 7 to 12, 2010. China won this year's event.

== Rules ==
- Winners' break.
- Teammates take shots alternately.
- Race to eight racks for matches prior to the quarterfinals.
- Race to nine racks for matches from the quarterfinals to the semifinals.
- Race to ten racks for the Final.
- Eighty-second shot clock for the shot immediately after the break, forty seconds for other shots.
- In order for a break to be legal, two balls must pass over the head string.

== Prize fund ==
Stage	Prize money (Total-US$250,000)
Winner	US$60,000
Runner Up	US$30,000
Semi Final	US$16,000
Quarter Final	US$10,000
Second Round	US$5,000
First Round	US$3,000

== Participating nations ==
- Seeded teams:
  1. Philippines A (Efren Reyes and Francisco Bustamante)
  2. USA (Rodney Morris and Johnny Archer)
  3. Philippines B (Roberto Gomez and Dennis Orcollo)
  4. England (Daryl Peach and Karl Boyes)
  5. Germany B (Ralf Souquet and Oliver Ortmann)
  6. Netherlands (Niels Feijen and Huidji See)
  7. Taiwan (Ko Pin-yi and Chang Jung-lin)
  8. China (Fu Jianbo and Li Hewen)
  9. Italy (Fabio Petroni and Bruno Muratore)
  10. Japan (Naoyuki Ōi and Toru Kuribayashi)
  11. Finland (Mika Immonen and Markus Juva)
  12. Canada (John Morra and Jason Klatt)
  13. France (Stephan Cohen and Francois Cottance)
  14. Spain (David Alcaide and Francisco Sánchez Ruiz)
  15. Poland (Radosław Babica and Mariusz Skoneczny)
  16. Indonesia (Muhammad Zulfikri and Ricky Yang)
- Unseeded teams:
  - Australia (James Delahunty and Ricky Emery)
  - Austria (Mario He and Jasmin Ouschan)
  - Belgium (Serge Das and Noel Bruynooghe)
  - Croatia (Carlo Dalmatin and Philipp Stojanovic)
  - Hong Kong (Lee Chenman and Kenny Kwok)
  - India (Raj Hundal and Dharminder Singh Lilly)
  - Korea (Yu Ram Cha and Ga Young Kim)
  - Malaysia (Ibrahim Bin Amir and Lee Poh Soon)
  - Malta (Tony Drago and Alex Borg)
  - Qatar (Mohammad Al Bin Ali and Bashar Hussain)
  - Russia (Konstantin Stepanov and Ruslan Chinakhov)
  - Singapore (Chan Keng Kwang and Toh Lian Han)
  - Slovenia (Matjaz Erculj and Matej Sulek)
  - Sweden (Marcus Chamat and Thomas Mehtala)
  - Thailand (Nitiwat Kanjanasri and Surethep Phoochalam)
  - Vietnam (Lương Chí Dũng and Do Hoang Quan)

== Tournament bracket ==
Round 1 Race to 8
1	Philippines A	8
Thailand	3
16	Indonesia	8
India	7
8	China	8
Belgium	2
9	Italy	8
Korea	6
5	Germany	8
Hong Kong	4
12	Canada	4
Russia	8
4	England	8
Qatar	7
13	France	8
Australia	5
3	Philippines B	8
Croatia	4
14	Spain	8
Vietnam	5
6	Netherlands	8
Austria	3
11	Finland	8
Singapore	2
7	Taiwan	8
Malaysia	2
10	Japan	8
Slovenia	7
2	USA	8
Sweden	7
15	Poland	8
Malta	6

Round 2 Race to 8
1	Philippines A	6
16	Indonesia	8
8	China	8
9	Italy	5
5	Germany	8
Russia	1
4	England	6
13	France	8
3	Philippines B	8
14	Spain	4
6	Netherlands	1
11	Finland	8
7	Taiwan	8
10	Japan	2
2	USA	7
15	Poland	8

Quarter-finals; Race to 9
16	Indonesia	3
8	China	9
5	Germany	9
13	France	7
3	Philippines B	9
11	Finland	1
7	Taiwan	9
15	Poland	5

Semi-finals; Race to 9
8	China	9
5	Germany	7
3	Philippines B	9
7	Taiwan	8

Final; Race to 10
8	China	10
3	Philippines B	5
