= 2022 World Cup of Pool =

Pool Tournament

2022 World Cup of Pool XV
Tournament information
- Dates: 14–19 June 2022
- Venue: Brentwood Centre
- City: Brentwood
- Country: England
- Organisation: Matchroom Sport
- Total prize fund: $250,000
- Winner's share: $60,000

The 2022 World Cup of Pool was a professional pool doubles tournament, and the 15th edition of the World Cup of Pool. The event was contested by 32 pairs representing different nations, and took place at the Brentwood Centre in Brentwood, England, from 14 to 19 June 2022.

The German team of Joshua Filler and Thorsten Hohmann were defending their 2021 title, but were knocked out in the second round to the Dutch pairing of Niels Feijen and Marc Bijsterbosch.

== Prize fund ==
The total prize money for the event:

- Winners (per pair): $60,000
- Runners-up (per pair): $30,000
- Semi-finalists (per pair): $15,000
- Quarter-finalists (per pair): $9,000
- Last 16 losers (per pair): $4,500
- Last 32 losers (per pair): $3,625

== Teams ==
Each competing nation features two players, with the hosts, Great Britain, receiving two places. The Filipino pairing of Efren Reyes and Carlo Biado were replaced by Thailand due to travel issues.

The competing teams were made of the players below:

- Eklent Kaçi & Besar Spahiu (ALB)
- Ariel Castro & Sebastian Rodriguez (ARG)
- James Georgiadis & Ivan Li (AUS)
- Albin Ouschan & Maximilian Lechner (AUT)
- Alex Pagulayan & John Morra (CAN)
- Ko Pin-yi & Ko Ping-chung (TPE)
- Anthony Brabin & Christos Meligaliotis (CYP)
- Roman Hybler & Petr Urban (CZE)
- Denis Grabe & Rainer Laar (EST)
- Mika Immonen & Jani Uski (FIN)
- Joshua Filler & Thorsten Hohmann (GER)
- Jayson Shaw & Elliott Sanderson (GBR)
- Imran Majid & Chris Melling (GBR)
- Alexander Kazakis & Nikos Ekonomopoulos (GRE)
- Lo Ho Sum & Robbie Capito (HKG)
- Olivér Szolnoki & Vilmos Földes (HUN)
- Daniele Corrieri & Francesco Candela (ITA)
- Naoyuki Ōi & Masato Yoshioka (JPN)
- Omar Al-Shaheen & Bader Alawadhi (KUW)
- My Cherif Zine El Abidine & Imad lagnaoui (MAR)
- Niels Feijen & Marc Bijsterbosch (NED)
- Matt Edwards & Simon Singleton (NZL)
- Mieszko Fortuński & Wojciech Szewczyk (POL)
- Andreja Klasović & Aleksa Pecelj (SRB)
- Aloysius Yapp & Toh Lian Han (SGP)
- Jason Theron & Kyle Akaloo (RSA)
- David Alcaide & Francisco Sánchez Ruiz (ESP)
- Ronald Regli & Dimitri Jungo (SUI)
- Waleed Majid & Ali Nasser Al Obaidli (QAT)
- Thepchaiya Un-Nooh & Noppon Saengkham (THA)
- Shane Van Boening & Skyler Woodward (USA)
- Dương Quốc Hoàng & Đặng Thành Kiên (VIE)

== Tournament bracket ==
Round 1 Race to 7
1	Germany	7
New Zealand	1
16	Netherlands	7
Morocco	1
9	Chinese Taipei	7
Argentina	2
8	Greece	7
Cyprus	4
5	Thailand	3
South Africa	7
12	Great Britain A	0
Great Britain B	7
13	Albania	7
Italy	2
4	Spain	7
Australia	1
3	Austria	1
Finland	7
14	Estonia	7
Serbia	6
11	Kuwait	7
Vietnam	5
6	Singapore	7
Qatar	3
7	Japan	6
Switzerland	7
10	Hungary	7
Czech Republic	4
15	Poland	7
Hong Kong	4
2	United States	7
Canada	1

Round 2 Race to 7
1	Germany	4
16	Netherlands	7
9	Chinese Taipei	7
8	Greece	6
South Africa	3
Great Britain B	7
13	Albania	1
4	Spain	7
Finland	7
14	Estonia	5
11	Kuwait	6
6	Singapore	7
Switzerland	7
10	Hungary	5
15	Poland	2
2	United States	7

Quarter-finals; Race to 9
16	Netherlands	8
9	Chinese Taipei	9
Great Britain B	2
4	Spain	9
Finland	6
6	Singapore	9
Switzerland	5
2	United States	9

Semi-finals; Race to 9
9	Chinese Taipei	4
4	Spain	9
6	Singapore	9
2	United States	3

Final; Race to 11
4	Spain	11
6	Singapore	6
