= 2013 World Cup of Pool =

Pool Tournament

Tournament information
- Dates: 17 to 22 September 2013
- Venue: York Hall
- City: London
- Country: England
- Organisation: Matchroom Sport
- Format: Single elimination tournament
- Total prize fund: $250,000
- Winner's share: $30,000 each

Final
- Champion: (Philippines) Lee Vann Corteza, Dennis Orcollo
- Runner-up: (Netherlands) – Niels Feijen, Nick van den Berg

The 2013 World Cup of Pool was the eighth edition of the tournament and was held at the York Hall, London from 17 to 22 September 2013. The event was won by the Philippine team of Lee Vann Corteza and Dennis Orcollo.

== Prize fund ==
- First place (per pair): $60,000
- Second place (per pair): $30,000
- Semi-finalists (per pair): $16,000
- Quarter-finalists (per pair): $10,000
- Last 16 losers (per pair): $5,000
- Last 32 losers (per pair): $3,000

== Teams ==
- Seeded teams:
  1. Finland (Mika Immonen and Petri Makkonen)
  2. England A (Darren Appleton and Karl Boyes)
  3. China (Li Hewen and Liu Haitao)
  4. USA (Shane Van Boening and Johnny Archer)
  5. Netherlands (Niels Feijen and Nick van den Berg)
  6. Philippines (Lee Vann Corteza and Dennis Orcollo)
  7. Chinese Taipei (Chang Jung-lin and Ko Pin-yi)
  8. England B (Daryl Peach and Chris Melling)
  9. Germany (Dominic Jentsch and Ralf Souquet)
  10. Greece (Nikos Ekonomopoulos and Alexander Kazakis)
  11. Poland (Radosław Babica and Tomasz Kapłan)
  12. Canada (Alex Pagulayan and John Morra)
  13. Japan (Naoyuki Ōi and Lo Li-wen)
  14. Russia (Konstantin Stepanov and Ruslan Tschinachow)
  15. Italy (Fabio Petroni and Bruno Muratore)
  16. South Korea (Ryu Sueng-woo and Ham Won-sik)
- Unseeded teams:
  - Australia (James Delahunty and David Rothall)
  - Austria (Albin Ouschan and Jasmin Ouschan)
  - Belgium (Serge Das and Moritz Lauwereyns)
  - Croatia (Karlo Dalmatin and Ivica Putnik)
  - Estonia (Denis Grabe and Erki Erm) [Qualifier 1]
  - Hong Kong (Lee Chenman and Kong Bu-Hong)
  - Hungary (Miko Balasz and Gabor Solymosi)
  - India (Raj Hundal and Amar Kang)
  - Indonesia (Ricky Yang and Irsal Nasution)
  - Kuwait (Omar Al-Shaheen and Khaled al-Mutairi)
  - Malta (Tony Drago and Alex Borg)
  - Portugal (Manuel Gama and Guilherme Sousa) [Qualifier 2]
  - Scotland (Jayson Shaw and Jonni Fulcher)
  - Singapore (Aloysius Yapp and Chan Keng Kwang)
  - Spain (David Alcaide and Juan Carlos Exposito)
  - Sweden (Andreas Gerwen and Marcus Chamat)

== Tournament bracket ==
Round of 32; Race to 7
1	Finland	7
Austria	2
16	South Korea	7
Estonia	2
8	England B	7
Portugal	4
9	Germany	7
Malta	4
5	Netherlands	7
Scotland	2
12	Canada	6
India	7
4	USA	7
Kuwait	5
13	Japan	7
Sweden	4
3	China	2
Hungary	7
14	Russia	7
Hong Kong	5
6	Philippines	7
Croatia	4
11	Poland	5
Singapore	7
7	Chinese Taipei	7
Belgium	5
10	Greece	7
Australia	0
2	England A	7
Indonesia	0
15	Italy	7
Spain	3

Round of 16; Race to 7
1	Finland	7
16	South Korea	6
8	England B	7
9	Germany	0
5	Netherlands	7
India	5
4	USA	6
13	Japan	7
Hungary	7
14	Russia	4
6	Philippines	7
Singapore	3
7	Chinese Taipei	7
10	Greece	1
2	England A	7
15	Italy	5

Quarter-finals; Race to 9
1	Finland	9
8	England B	4
5	Netherlands	9
13	Japan	8
Hungary	1
6	Philippines	9
7	Chinese Taipei	9
2	England A	3

Semi-finals; Race to 9
1	Finland	4
5	Netherlands	9
6	Philippines	9
7	Chinese Taipei	7

Final; Race to 10
5	Netherlands	8
6	Philippines	10
