= 2012 World Cup of Pool =

Tournament information
- Dates: 4–9 September 2012
- Venue: Robinsons Place Manila
- City: Manila
- Country: Philippines
- Organisation: Matchroom Sport
- Format: Single elimination tournament
- Total prize fund: $250,000
- Winner's share: $30,000 per player

Final
- Champion: (Finland) (Mika Immonen and Petri Makkonen)
- Runner-up: (Poland) (Karol Skowerski and Wojciech Szewczyk)
- Score: 10–8

The 2012 World Cup of Pool is the seventh edition of the said tournament. For the fourth straight year, the event is once again being held in the Philippines, this time at the Robinsons Place Manila in Manila, from September 4 to 9, 2012. The Finnish team of Mika Immonen and Petri Makkonen defeated the Polish team of Karol Skowerski and Wojciech Szewczyk in the final, 10–8.

== Tournament Rules ==
- Winners' break.
- Teammates take shots alternately.
- Race to eight racks for matches prior to the quarterfinals.
- Race to nine racks for matches from the quarterfinals to the semifinals.
- Race to ten racks for the Final.
- Eighty-second shot clock for the shot immediately after the break, forty seconds for other shots.
- In order for a break to be legal, at least two balls must pass over the head string.

=== Prize fund ===
- Winners (per pair): $60,000
- Runners-up (per pair): $30,000
- Semi-finalists (per pair): $16,000
- Quarter-finalists (per pair): $10,000
- Round 2 losers (per pair): $5,000
- Round 1 losers (per pair): $3,000

== Participating nations ==
- Seeded teams:
  1. Germany (Ralf Souquet and Thorsten Hohmann)
  2. Philippines A (Lee Vann Corteza and Dennis Orcollo)
  3. England (Darren Appleton and Chris Melling)
  4. China (Liu Haitao and Li Hewen)
  5. USA (Shane Van Boening and Rodney Morris)
  6. Chinese Taipei (Han En Hsu and Hsin Ting Chen)
  7. Netherlands (Nick van den Berg and Huidji See)
  8. Philippines B (Francisco Bustamante and Efren Reyes)
  9. Canada (Alex Pagulayan and John Morra)
  10. Poland (Karol Skowerski and Wojciech Szewczyk)
  11. Japan (Naoyuki Ōi and Satoshi Kawabata)
  12. Austria (Albin Ouschan and Mario He)
  13. Spain (David Alcaide and Francisco Diaz Pizarro)
  14. Thailand (Nitiwat Kanjanasri and Kobkit Palajin)
  15. Italy (Bruno Muratore and Fabio Petroni)
  16. Finland (Mika Immonen and Petri Makkonen)
- Unseeded teams:
  - Australia (Dave Reljic and Ian Barber)
  - Belgium (Serge Das and Cliff Castelein)
  - Croatia (Karlo Dalmatin and Philipp Stojanovic)
  - Hong Kong (Lee Chenman and Kenny Kwok)
  - Hungary (Miko Balazs and Gabor Solymosi)
  - India (Raj Hundal and Amar Kang)
  - Indonesia (Roy Apancho and Muhammad Bewi Simanjuntak)
  - Korea (Ryu Seung Woo and Lee Wan Su)
  - Kuwait (Abdullah Al Yousef and Omar Al Shaheen)
  - Malaysia (Patrick Ooi Fook Yuen and Ibrahim Bin Amir)
  - Russia (Konstantin Stepanov and Vitaly Pavlukhin)
  - Serbia (Andrea Klasovic and Zoran Svilar)
  - Singapore (Aloysius Yapp and Chan Keng Kwang)
  - Sweden (Marcus Chamat and Andreas Gerwen)
  - Switzerland (Dimitri Jungo and Ronni Regli)
  - Vietnam (Nguyễn Anh Tuấn and Do The Kien)

== Tournament bracket ==
Round of 32; Race to 8
1	Germany	8
Serbia	1
16	Finland	8
Korea	6
8	Philippines	8
Hong Kong	3
9	Canada	8
Sweden	7
5	USA	8
India	7
12	Austria	8
Kuwait	2
4	China	8
Singapore	4
13	Spain	8
Hungary	3
3	England	8
Belgium	2
14	Thailand	8
Malaysia	4
6	Chinese Taipei	8
Indonesia	6
11	Japan	8
Russia	6
7	Netherlands	8
Croatia	7
10	Poland	8
Australia	6
2	Philippines	7
Switzerland	8
15	Italy	8
Vietnam	7

Round of 16; Race to 8
1	Germany	4
16	Finland	8
8	Philippines	8
9	Canada	5
5	USA	8
12	Austria	4
4	China	8
13	Spain	1
3	England	8
14	Thailand	2
6	Chinese Taipei	8
11	Japan	6
7	Netherlands	6
10	Poland	8
Switzerland	1
15	Italy	8

Quarter-finals; Race to 9
16	Finland	9
8	Philippines	5
5	USA	9
4	China	8
3	England	8
6	Chinese Taipei	9
10	Poland	9
15	Italy	6

Semi-finals; Race to 9
16	Finland	9
5	USA	7
6	Chinese Taipei	4
10	Poland	9

Final; Race to 10
16	Finland	10
10	Poland	8
