= 2019 World Cup of Pool =

Professional doubles pool event - June 2019

2019 World Cup of Pool XIII
Tournament information
- Dates: 25–30 June 2019
- Venue: Morningside Arena
- City: Leicester
- Country: England
- Organisation: Matchroom Sport
- Total prize fund: $250,000
- Winner's share: $60,000

Final
- Champion: Austria; Mario He; Albin Ouschan
- Runner-up: Philippines; Carlo Biado; Jeff de Luna
- Score: 11–3

The 2019 World Cup of Pool was a professional pool doubles tournament, and the 13th edition of the World Cup of Pool. The event was contested by 32 pairs representing different nations, and took place at the Morningside Arena in Leicester, England, from 25 to 30 June 2019. As host nation, Great Britain were allowed to enter two teams in the draw.

The Austrian team of Mario He and Albin Ouschan won the event, defeating Carlo Biado and Jeff de Luna of the Philippines, 11–3 in the final. This was the Austrian pairs second title in three years, having also won the event in 2017. The pair had also reached the final in the 2018 event, losing just one game in three years.

== Prize fund ==
The total prize money for the event:

- Winners (per pair): $60,000
- Runners-up (per pair): $30,000
- Semi-finalists (per pair): $15,000
- Quarter-finalists (per pair): $9,000
- Last 16 losers (per pair): $4,500
- Last 32 losers (per pair): $3,625

== Teams ==
Each competing nation features two players, with the hosts, Great Britain, receiving two places. The competing teams were made of the players below:

- Eklent Kaçi & Besar Spahiu (ALB)
- Justin Sajich & Danny Stone (AUS)
- Mario He & Albin Ouschan (AUT)
- Fabio Luersen & Luis Gustavo da Silva (BRA)
- Alex Pagulayan & John Morra (CAN)
- Enrique Rojas & Alejandro Carvajal (CHL)
- Wu Jia-qing & Liu Haitao (CHN)
- Ko Pin-yi & Ko Ping-chung (TPE)
- Roman Hybler & Michal Gaveniak (CZE)
- Philipp Stojanovic & Roberto Barto (CRO)
- Denis Grabe & Mark Magi (EST)
- Petri Makkonen & Mika Immonen (FIN)
- Alex Montpellier & Fabio Rizzi (FRA)
- Joshua Filler & Ralf Souquet (GER)
- Jayson Shaw & Chris Melling (GBR) A
- Mark Gray & Imran Majid (GBR) B
- Alexander Kazakis & Nick Malai (GRE)
- Niels Feijen & Marc Bijsterbosch (NED)
- Lo Ho Sum & Yip Kin Ling Leo (HKG)
- Fabio Petroni & Daniele Corrieri (ITA)
- Naoyuki Ōi & Toru Kuribayashi (JPN)
- Tony Drago & Clayton Castaldi (MLT)
- Matt Edwards & Simon Singleton (NZL)
- Carlo Biado & Jeff de Luna (PHL)
- Konrad Juszczyszyn & Mateusz Śniegocki (POL)
- Fedor Gorst & Ruslan Chinakhov (RUS)
- Babken Melkonyan & Ioan Ladanyi (ROM)
- Aloysuis Yapp & Sharik Aslam Sayed (SGP)
- Richard Halliday & Jason Theron (SAF)
- David Alcaide & Francisco Sánchez Ruiz (ESP)
- Marcus Chamat & Tomas Larsson (SWE)
- Shane Van Boening & Skyler Woodward (USA)

== Tournament bracket ==
Round 1 Race to 7
1	China	7
25	Sweden	1
26	Chile	7
16	Great Britain B	5
9	Netherlands	7
24	South Africa	2
32	Brazil	2
8	United States	7
5	Philippines	7
19	Czech Republic	6
17	Albania	7
12	Russia	3
13	Canada	7
27	France	2
20	Estonia	7
4	Germany	6
3	Chinese Taipei	7
30	Romania	2
23	New Zealand	3
14	Greece	7
11	Japan	4
28	Hong Kong	7
31	Croatia	3
6	Austria	7
7	Spain	7
18	Australia	5
29	Singapore	5
10	Finland	7
15	Poland	7
21	Italy	5
22	Malta	5
2	Great Britain A	7

Round 2 Race to 7
1	China	7
17	Chile	6
9	Netherlands	7
8	United States	3
5	Philippines	7
21	Albania	5
13	Canada	7
29	Estonia	6
3	Chinese Taipei	5
14	Greece	7
22	Hong Kong	5
6	Austria	7
7	Spain	7
10	Finland	5
15	Poland	5
2	Great Britain A	7

Quarter-finals; Race to 9
1	China	5
9	Netherlands	9
5	Philippines	9
13	Canada	5
14	Greece	2
6	Austria	9
7	Spain	9
2	Great Britain A	6

Semi-finals; Race to 9
9	Netherlands	6
5	Philippines	9
6	Austria	9
7	Spain	3

Final; Race to 11
5	Philippines	3
6	Austria	11
