= 2017 World Cup of Pool =

Tournament information
- Venue: York Hall
- City: London
- Country: England
- Organisation: Matchroom Sport
- Format: Single elimination tournament
- Total prize fund: $250,000
- Winner's share: $30,000 each

Final
- Champion: (Austria) Mario He & Albin Ouschan
- Runner-up: (United States) Shane Van Boening & Skyler Woodward

The 2017 World Cup of Pool was the eleventh edition of the tournament. The event was held in York Hall, London, England, from 13 to 18 June. A total of 32 two-player teams participated in the tournament.

== Prize fund ==
A total of $250,000 constituted the prize fund.

- Winners (per pair): $60,000
- Runners-up (per pair): $30,000
- Semi-finalists (per pair): $15,000
- Quarter-finalists (per pair): $9,000
- Last 16 losers (per pair): $4,500
- Last 32 losers (per pair): $3,625

== Competing teams ==
Seed	Team	Players	
1	Chinese Taipei	Ko Pin-yi	Chang Yu-Lung
2	Austria	Mario He	Albin Ouschan
3	China	Wu Jia-qing	Dang Jinhu
4	England	Darren Appleton	Mark Gray
5	United States	Shane Van Boening	Skyler Woodward
6	Netherlands	Niels Feijen	Nick van den Berg
7	Scotland	Jayson Shaw	Pat Holtz
8	Canada	Alex Pagulayan	John Morra
9	Japan	Naoyuki Ōi	Hayato Hijikata
10	England	Imran Majid	Daryl Peach
11	Philippines	Carlo Biado	Johann Chua
12	Spain	David Alcaide	Francisco Sánchez
13	Finland	Mika Immonen	Petri Makkonen
14	Germany	Ralf Souquet	Thorsten Hohmann
15	Russia	Ruslan Tschinachow	Konstantin Stepanov
16	Poland	Mateusz Śniegocki	Wojciech Szewczyk
17	Greece	Nikos Ekonomopoulos	Alexander Kazakis
18	Norway	Mats Schjetne	Tom Bjerke
19	Portugal	Joao Grilo	Rui Franco
20	Romania	Robert Braga	Ioan Ladanyi
21	Sweden	Marcus Chamat	Daniel Tångudd
22	Hungary (Note: The Hong Kong team (Andrew Kong and Lo Ho Sum) withdrew. The Hungarian team took the starting position before the tournament)	Gabor Solymosi	Gabor Antal
23	India	Raj Hundal	Amar Kang
24	Indonesia	Irsal Nasution	Muhammad Simanjuntak
25	Malaysia	Kok Jken Yung	Muhammad Almie
26	Singapore	Toh Lian Han	Aloysius Yapp
27	Thailand	Amnuayporn Chotipong	Tanut Makkamontree
28	Australia	Justin Campbell	Michael Cacciola
29	Kuwait	Bader al-Awadhi	Mohammad al-Kashawi
30	New Zealand	Matthew Edwards	Toar Dotulong
31	Malta (Note: The South African team (David Anderson and Francois Ellis) was replaced by the Maltese shortly before the start of the tournament.)	Tony Drago	Ryan Pisani
32	Qatar	Waleed Majid	Bashar Hussain

== Bracket ==
Round 1
1	Chinese Taipei	7
29	Kuwait	3
16	Poland	7
17	Greece	6
9	Japan	7
27	Thailand	2
8	Canada	7
28	Australia	5
5	United States	7
26	Singapore	0
12	Spain	7
20	Romania	6
13	Finland	7
18	Norway	0
4	England	4
23	India	7
3	China	7
19	Portugal	5
14	Germany	7
31	Malta	2
11	Philippines	7
32	Qatar	4
6	Netherlands	7
22	Hungary	0
7	Scotland	7
30	New Zealand	6
10	England	7
24	Indonesia	0
15	Russia	7
25	Malaysia	0
2	Austria	7
21	Sweden	5

Round 2
1	Chinese Taipei	7
16	Poland	5
9	Japan	7
8	Canada	3
5	United States	7
12	Spain	5
13	Finland	7
23	India	4
3	China	7
14	Germany	0
11	Philippines	7
6	Netherlands	5
7	Scotland	6
10	England	7
15	Russia	2
2	Austria	7

Quarterfinal
1	Chinese Taipei	9
9	Japan	2
5	United States	9
13	Finland	4
3	China	9
11	Philippines	2
10	England	7
2	Austria	9

Semifinal
1	Chinese Taipei	4
5	United States	9
3	China	1
2	Austria	9

Final
5	United States	6
2	Austria	10

== Final ==
The final was played between the United States and Austria. Austria were crowned World Cup of Pool champions after victory over USA, with a final score of 10–6.
