= 2006 World Cup of Pool =

Doubles pool event, held August 2006

2006 partypoker.com World Cup of Pool
Tournament information
- Dates: 22–27 August 2006
- Venue: Newport Centre
- City: Newport
- Country: Wales
- Organisation: Matchroom Sport
- Format: Single Elimination
- Total prize fund: $250,000
- Winner's share: $30,000 per player

Final
- Champion: (Philippines) Efren Reyes and Francisco Bustamante
- Runner-up: (United States) Earl Strickland and Rodney Morris
- Score: 13–5

The 2006 World Cup of Pool (also known as the 2006 PartyPoker.com World Cup of Pool for the purposes of sponsorship) was a professional nine-ball pool competition, the first World Cup of Pool, a scotch doubles knockout championship representing 32 national teams. The event was held at the Newport Centre in Newport, Wales, from 22 to 27 August 2006. The event was held as a single-elimination tournament, for a total prize fund of $250,000 with $60,000 being awarded to the winner. The tournament was organised by Matchroom Sport, sponsored by poker website Partypoker, and broadcast on Sky TV.

The event was won by the Filipino team of Efren Reyes and Francisco Bustamante who defeated the American duo of Earl Strickland and Rodney Morris 13–5 in the final. The event saw multiple world pool champions in the field, as well as snooker world champions in Steve Davis and Ronnie O'Sullivan. The unseeded Vietnamese team of Nguyen Thanh Nam and Lương Chí Dũng reached the semi-finals, where they won $8,000 each, three-times the country's national average wage.

== Format ==
The 2006 World Cup of Pool was a pairs nine-ball tournament played at Newport Centre in Newport, Wales. The tournament was played between 22 and 27 August 2006 as scotch doubles, with players taking shots alternatively. Matches were played as a race-to-nine racks until the final, which was played as a race-to-thirteen. The tournament was a single-elimination bracket, consisting of 32 teams. The event was played with the alternating breaks system, as to the traditional winner breaks as seen in other nine-ball events. The tournament was the inaugural World Cup of Pool event, sponsored by Partypoker, and created by Matchroom Sport. The event was filmed and broadcast by Matchroom Sport across 31 single hour programs on Sky TV.

=== Prize fund ===
A total of $250,000 was made available for the prize pool, with $60,000 being awarded to the winning team. Money earned by the team was shared between their players. A breakdown of prize money is shown below:

Stage	Prize money
Winner	$60,000
Runner-up	$30,000
Semi-final	$16,000
Quarter-final	$10,000
Second round	$5,000
First round	$3,000
Total	$250,000

=== Teams ===
The field consisted of 32 teams, with England having two teams. The participating teams are shown below, numbers in brackets denote seeded teams.

- Philippines (Efren Reyes and Francisco Bustamante) (1)
- Netherlands (Nick van den Berg and Niels Feijen) (2)
- United States (Earl Strickland and Rodney Morris) (3)
- Germany (Thomas Engert and Oliver Ortmann) (4)
- Chinese Taipei (Wang Hung-hsiang and Yang Ching-shun) (5)
- Sweden (Marcus Chamat and Tom Storm) (6)
- Finland (Mika Immonen and Markus Juva) (7)
- Canada (Luc Salvas and Tyler Edey) (8)
- Poland (Radosław Babica and Mariusz Rote) (9)
- Italy (Fabio Petroni and Angelo Millauro) (10)
- Russia (Konstantin Stepanov and Konstantin Zolotilov) (11)
- Japan (Maasaki Tanaka and Satoshi Kawabata) (12)
- England A (Raj Hundal and Ronnie O'Sullivan) (13)
- Korea (Jeong Young-hwa and Lee Gun-jae) (14)
- Croatia (Philipp Stovanovic and Ivan Kralj) (15)
- Malaysia (Patrick Ooi Fook Yuen and Ibrahim Bin Amir) (16)
- Czech Republic (Roman Hybler and Michal Gavenciak)
- England B (Steve Davis and Daryl Peach)
- Hong Kong (Lee Chenman and Kong Man-ho)
- Hungary (Vilmos Foldes and Gabor Solymosi)
- India (Dharminder Lilly and Alok Kumar)
- Indonesia (Imran Ibrahim and Ricky Yang)
- Ireland (Tommy Donlon and Paddy McLaughlin)
- Malta (Tony Drago and Alex Borg)
- Qatar (Fahad Mohammadi and Bashar Hussain)
- Scotland (Michael Valentine and Pat Holtz)
- Singapore (Chan Keng Kwang and Toh Lian Han)
- South Africa (David Anderson and Yulan Govender)
- Spain (David Alcaide and Rafael Guzman)
- Thailand (Tepwin Arunnath and Amnuayporn Chotipong)
- Vietnam (Nguyen Thanh Nam and Lương Chí Dũng)
- Wales (Rob McKenna and Ben Davies)

== Summary ==
=== Early rounds (first–second round) ===
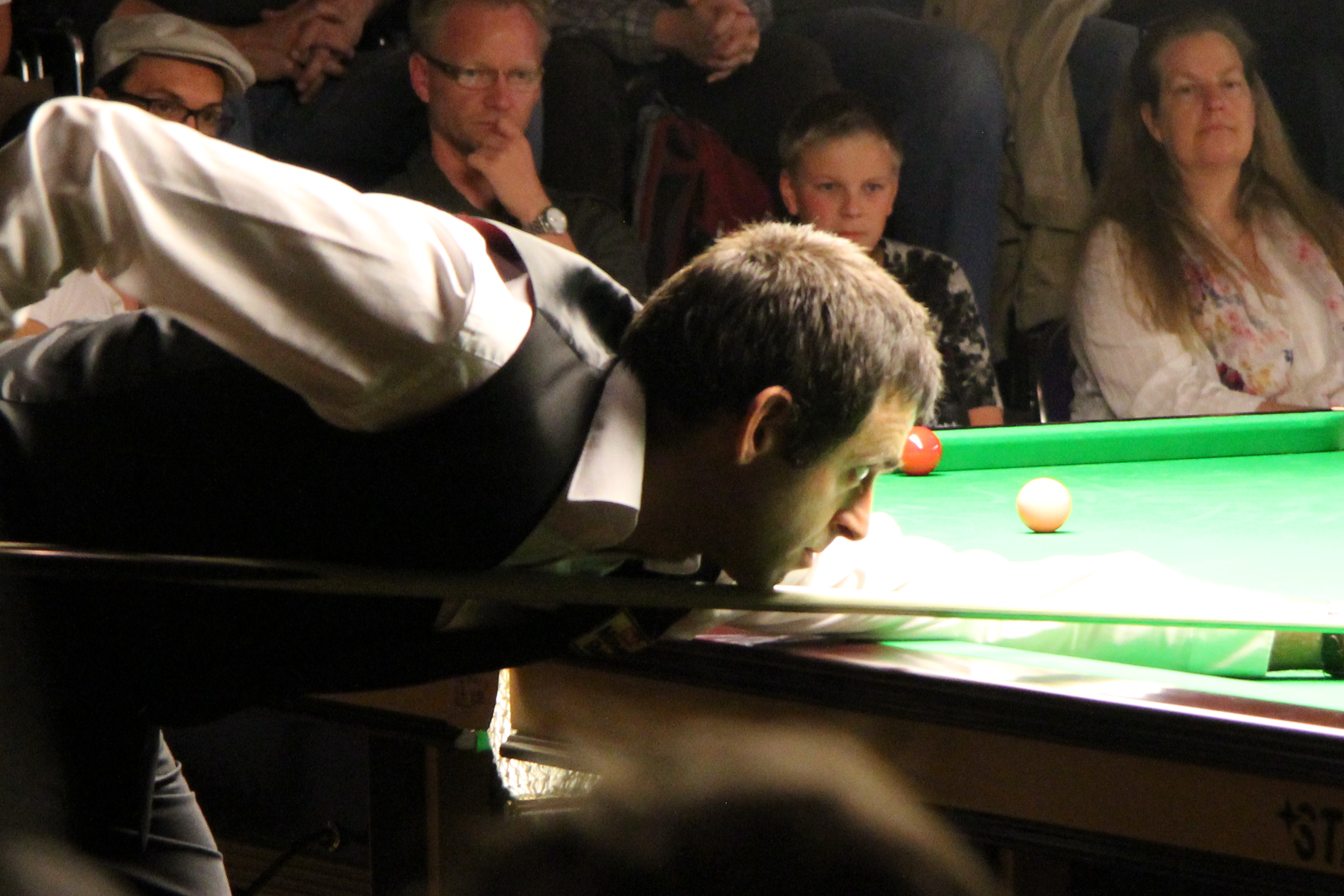
Snooker player Ronnie O'Sullivan (pictured in 2011) competed at the event, but lost to the Spanish team 8–9 in the first round

The first round was played between 22 and 24 August. The Filipino team of Efren Reyes and Francisco Bustamante won their match over Malta 9–0. Steve Davis partnered Daryl Peach for the first time in the event, but still defeated the Korean team 9–6. Davis commented post-match, "It was hard to get ahead – every time we took the lead they got back into it but we stuck at it and came good in the end." The second England team, however, lost on a deciding rack to Spain. Raj Hundal and Ronnie O'Sullivan trailed 0–4 after just 20 minutes, but tied the match at 7–7. O'Sullivan scratched on the break in rack 15, but Rafael Guzmán of Spain missed a shot on the 9-ball to allow the English team to lead 8–7. The Spanish side however took the next two frames to win the match.

In travelling to the event, Luc Salvas lost his cue stick, so he and Canadian partner Tyler Edey shared a cue, but still won 9–5 over Thailand. Sweden and Hong Kong featured a deciding rack. Hong Kong trailed 1–4, 6–2 and 8–5, but tied the match at 8–8. With just the final two balls remaining, Lee Chenman made a difficult 8-ball to allow the Hong Kong team to win 9–8. Chenman later commented that the odds of 2/1 against the team winning prior to the match pushed them to victory. In their match against the host Wales team, the Germany team of Thomas Engert and Oliver Ortmann took an early 6–0 lead, and won 9–2. The Japanese team received a walkover against Indonesia, as the later failed to secure visas to compete at the event. The unseeded Vietnamese team of Nguyen Thanh Nam and Lương Chí Dũng won 9–8 over Croatia in a match full of errors. The Dutch team of Niels Feijen and Nick van den Berg defeated the Scottish pair 9–5.

The second round was played 24 and 25 August. The remaining United Kingdom team, the England B side were eliminated by the US team of Earl Strickland and Rodney Morris. The teams were tied at 3–3 but the US team won six straight racks to win 9–3. Fifth seed Taiwan were tied at 4–4 with Japan, before winning the next five racks to win 9–4. Hong Kong completed their second 9–8 win, this time over 11th seed Russia. The Canadian side trailed 4–7, but won the next four racks to lead 8–7 over the Czech team. However, the Czechs won the final two racks to reach the quarter-finals. The Filipino team defeated Malaysia 9–5.

=== Later rounds (quarter-finals–final) ===
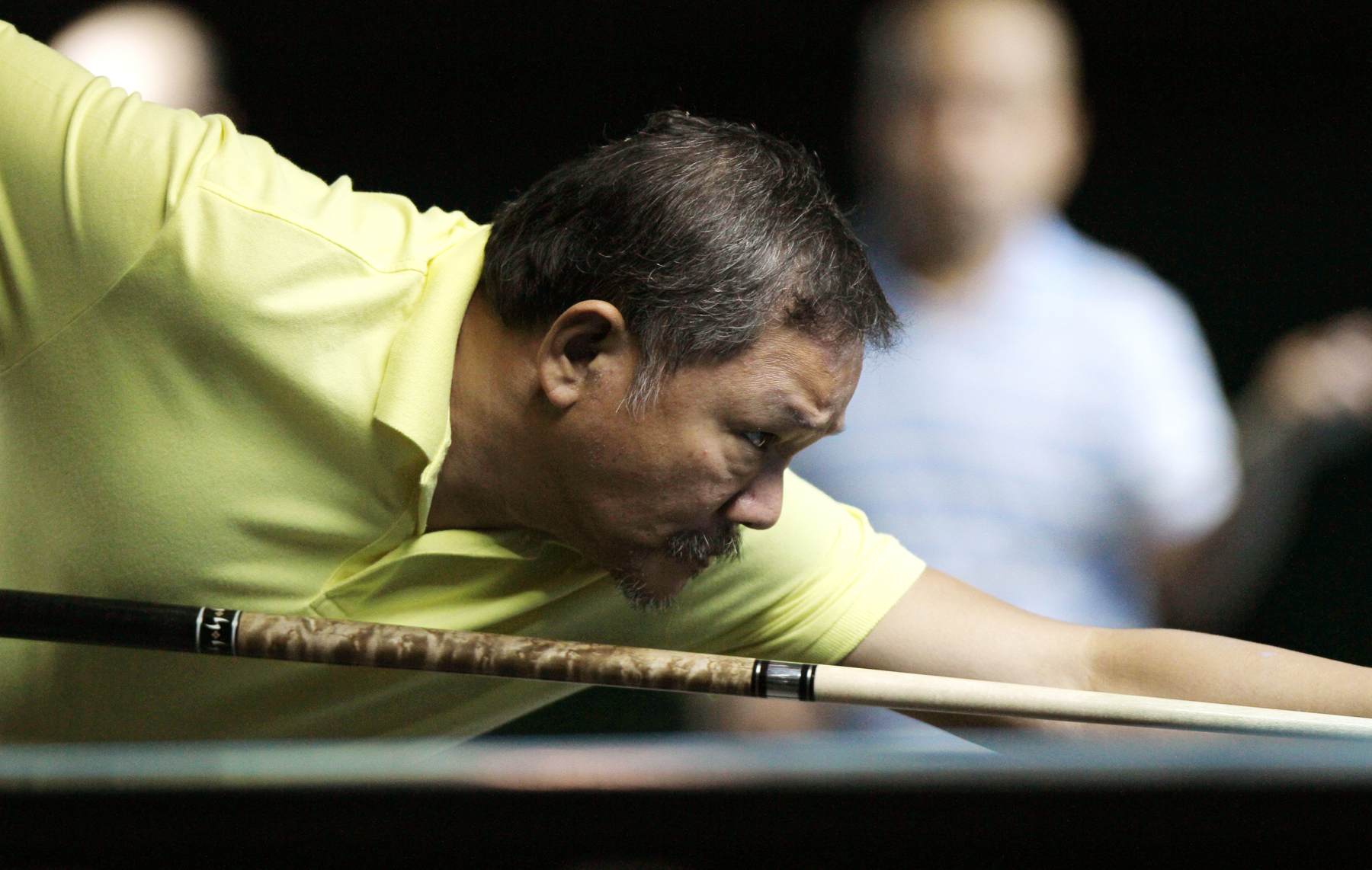

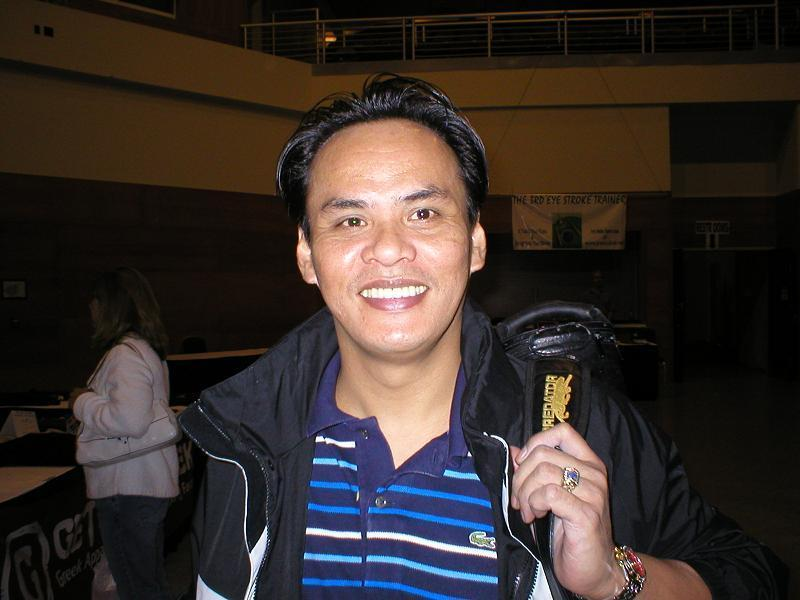
Efren Reyes (pictured in 2012, top) alongside Francisco Bustamante (bottom) won the event.

The quarter-finals were played on 26 August. The Vietnam team of Nguyen Thanh Nam and Lương Chí Dũng won their third match in the tournament 9–8, this time over the Italian team. The Italians led the match 8–7, but a combination and table-length shot on the 2-ball by Nguyen allowed the Vietnam team to win the match. The German team of Ortmann and Engert defeated the Taiwanese team 9–4. The Philippine team (and top seeds) defeated the Czech Republic 9–6. The Filipino team won the first three frames, but won just one of the next seven to trail 4–6. However, they then won the next five frames to win the match. Bustamante called the match "scary", and said that they had "played badly". With pre-tournament odds of 150/1, the Hong Kong team were defeated 3–9 against the American team.

The semi-finals were played 27 August. The first semi-final was held between the Philippines and Germany. The Filipino team led 5–4, and won rack 10 with a fluke, escaping from a snooker and took the next to lead 7–4. The German team won the next three racks to tie the match 7–7. The Philippines won the next rack, before Ortmann missed banking the 2-ball in rack 16 and the Filipino team cleared the table to win 9–7. The second semi-final was held between the Vietnam and US teams. The unseeded Vietnam team had already beaten three seeded teams to get to the semi-finals, and won the opening rack. They then came from behind to tie the match at 3–3, before the US team won three racks in a row. The US team also had a three rack advantage at 8–5 to go to the hill. Nguyen made a difficult shot on the 9-ball in rack 14, and also won rack 15 to trail 7–8. Breaking to go hill-hill, Nguyen missed a shot with the cue behind his back on the 5-ball allowing the US team to take the rack and win 9–7. Even in losing, the pair won $8,000 each, three-times the national average wage in Vietnam.

The final was contested on the evening of the same day as a race-to-13 racks, between Efren Reyes and Francisco Bustamante of the Philippines and Earl Strickland and Rodney Morris of the US. The final was attended by a crowd of 900 people, the majority of which were Expatriates supporting the Philippines. With the scores tied at 4–4, the Philippine team won 7 consecutive racks, to take a 11–4 lead, and eventually win the final 13–5. Morris said of the match: "That was pretty disappointing. After 4–4 it didn't go our way although the match was closer than the score suggested but when it went to 7–4 we were both pretty deflated and felt it slipping away. We never really got a clear shot off the break and it was a tough hill to climb but they played great – the way they were supposed to so congratulations to them." Bustamante commented that the event win was due to his partner's play saying, "Efren played lots of unbelievable shots; some of them I've never seen in my life! That's why we won."

== Tournament bracket ==
Below is the results from the event. Teams in bold denote match winners. Numbers to the left of teams represents the team's seedings.

Round 1 Race to 9
1	**Philippines**	**9**
Malta	0
16	**Malaysia**	**9**
Qatar	3
9	Poland	6
**Czech Republic**	**9**
8	**Canada**	**9**
Thailand	5
5	**Chinese Taipei**	**9**
India	6
12	**Japan**	**9**
Indonesia	0
13	England 1	8
**Spain**	**9**
4	**Germany**	**9**
Wales	2
3	**United States**	**9**
Singapore	6
14	South Korea	6
**England 2**	**9**
11	**Russia**	**9**
Hungary	3
6	Sweden	8
**Hong Kong**	**9**
7	**Finland**	**9**
Ireland	5
10	**Italy**	**9**
South Africa	2
15	Croatia	8
**Vietnam**	**9**
2	**Netherlands**	**9**
Scotland	5

Round 2 Race to 9
1	**Philippines**	**9**
16	Malaysia	5
**Czech Republic**	**9**
8	Canada	8
5	**Chinese Taipei**	**9**
12	Japan	4
Spain	5
4	**Germany**	**9**
3	**United States**	**9**
England 2	3
11	Russia	8
**Hong Kong**	**9**
7	Finland	2
10	**Italy**	**9**
**Vietnam**	**9**
2	Netherlands	8

Quarter-finals; Race to 9
1	**Philippines**	**9**
Czech Republic	6
5	Chinese Taipei	4
4	**Germany**	**9**
3	**United States**	**9**
Hong Kong	3
10	Italy	8
**Vietnam**	**9**

Semi-finals; Race to 9
1	**Philippines**	**9**
4	Germany	7
3	**United States**	**9**
Vietnam	7

Final; Race to 13
1	**Philippines**	**13**
3	United States	5
