= Wang Can (pool player) =

Chinese pool player

Personal information
- Born: 10 February 1994 (age 32)

Pool career
- Country: China
- Pool games: nine-ball

Wang Can (born 10 February 1994) is a Chinese professional pool player. Wang has represented China at the World Cup of Pool with playing partner Dang Jinhu. He reached the quarter-finals at the 2014 event, losing to the pair of Albin Ouschan and Mario He.

== Titles ==
- 2014 WPA World Team Championship
