= 2018 World Cup of Pool =

World Cup of Pool XII
Tournament information
- Dates: 15–20 May
- Venue: Luwan Gymnasium
- City: Shanghai
- Country: China
- Organisation: Matchroom Sport
- Total prize fund: $250,000
- Winner's share: $60,000

Final
- Champion: China A
- Runner-up: Austria
- Score: 10–3

The 2018 World Cup of Pool was the twelfth edition of the tournament. The event took place in Luwan Gymnasium, Shanghai, China, from 15 to 20 May 2018.

== Prize fund ==
- Winners (per pair): $60,000
- Runners-up (per pair): $30,000
- Semi-finalists (per pair): $15,000
- Quarter-finalists (per pair): $9,000
- Last 16 losers (per pair): $4,500
- Last 32 losers (per pair): $3,625

== Participating nations ==
- Seeded teams:
  1. Austria (Mario He & Albin Ouschan)
  2. China A (Wu Jia-qing & Liu Haitao)
  3. Chinese Taipei (Chang Jung-lin & Cheng Yu-hsuan)
  4. Philippines (Carlo Biado & Jeff de Luna)
  5. Germany (Ralf Souquet & Joshua Filler)
  6. USA (Shane Van Boening & Skyler Woodward)
  7. Spain (David Alcaide & Francisco Sánchez Ruiz)
  8. Netherlands (Niels Feijen & Marc Bijsterbosch)
  9. Canada (Jason Klatt & Alex Pagulayan)
  10. Japan (Naoyuki Ōi & Tōru Kuribayashi)
  11. Finland (Mika Immonen & Petri Makkonen)
  12. China B (Dejing Kong & Ming Wang)
  13. England (Imran Majid & Mark Gray)
  14. Greece (Alexander Kazakis & Nick Malaj)
  15. Russia (Ruslan Chinakhov & Fedor Gorst)
  16. Poland (Mateusz Śniegocki & Wiktor Zieliński)
- Unseeded teams:
  - Albania (Eklent Kaçi & Edmond Zaja)
  - Australia (James Delahunty & Justin Sajich)
  - Chile (Alejandro Carvajal & Enrique Rojas)
  - Estonia (Denis Grabe & Mark Mägi)
  - Hong Kong (Lo Ho Sum & Robbie Capito)
  - Indonesia (Arun & Feri Satriyadi)
  - Kuwait (Bader Al Awadhi & Mohammad Al Khashawi)
  - Malaysia (Muhammad Almie & Darryl Chia)
  - New Zealand (Matt Edwards & Marco Teutscher)
  - Scotland (Jayson Shaw & Scott Gillespie)
  - Singapore (Aloysius Yapp & Toh Lian Han)
  - South Africa (Richard Halliday & Jacobus Le Roux)
  - South Korea (Ryu Seung-woo & Jeong Young-hwa)
  - Sweden (Christian Sparrenloev-Fischer & Tomas Larsen)
  - Thailand (Nitiwat Kanjanasri & Tanut Makkamontree)
  - Vietnam (Dương Quốc Hoàng & Nguyễn Anh Tuấn)

== Tournament bracket ==
Round 1 Race to 7
1	Austria	7
Chile	3
16	Poland	7
Kuwait	4
9	Canada	3
Scotland	7
8	Netherlands	7
Thailand	5
5	Germany	7
Indonesia	0
12	China B	7
South Africa	2
13	England	7
South Korea	2
4	Philippines	7
New Zealand	3
3	Chinese Taipei	7
Albania	1
14	Greece	7
Hong Kong	0
11	Finland	7
Malaysia	3
6	USA	7
Singapore	5
7	Spain	7
Vietnam	3
10	Japan	5
Sweden	7
15	Russia	4
Australia	7
2	China A	7
Estonia	6

Round 2 Race to 7
1	Austria	7
16	Poland	6
Scotland	2
8	Netherlands	7
5	Germany	5
12	China B	7
13	England	0
4	Philippines	7
3	Chinese Taipei	7
14	Greece	1
11	Finland	5
6	USA	7
7	Spain	7
Sweden	3
Australia	4
2	China A	7

Quarter-finals; Race to 9
1	Austria	9
8	Netherlands	3
12	China B	9
4	Philippines	1
3	Chinese Taipei	9
6	USA	5
7	Spain	8
2	China A	9

Semi-finals; Race to 9
1	Austria	9
12	China B	8
3	Chinese Taipei	7
2	China A	9

Final; Race to 10
1	Austria	3
2	China A	10
