= Roy Apancho =

Indonesian professional pool player

Pool career
- Country: Indonesia
- Best finish: Last 32 2006 WPA World Nine-ball Championship

Roy Apancho is an Indonesian professional pool player. During the 2006 WPA World Nine-ball Championship he survived the group stages despite losing 8–5 to Efren Reyes in the double elimination round, and the round of 64, but was eliminated in the round of 32 by Rodolfo Luat.

In 2012, Apancho would represent Indonesia in their sole World Cup of Pool appearance, at the 2012 event. He partnered Muhammad Bewi Simanjuntak, but would lose 6–8 to the Chinese Taipei team of Han En-hsu and Hsin Ting-chen.
