= Radosław Babica =

Polish pool player, born 1979

Personal information
- Born: 18 July 1979 (age 47) Kielce, Poland

Pool career
- Country: Poland
- Best finish: Quarter-finals (2005 WPA World Eight-ball Championship)

Tournament wins
- Current rank: 34
- Highest rank: 12

Radosław Babica (born 18 July 1979) is a Polish professional pool player from Kielce, who reached number 12 in the World Pool-Billiard Association world rankings in 2009.

== Career ==
Babica final reached the European Pool Championships final of the 9-Ball event in 2007. He later also reached the final in the 10-Ball event and three more semi-final appearances at European Championships (one each in the 8-Ball, 9-ball and 14/1 endless). On the Euro Tour his best result so far was a second place - scored by the Costa del Sol Open 2007 held in Malaga.

Babica is five-time champion of Poland in singles and also a four time national team champion. His best result so far in a world championship was reaching the quarter-finals at the 2005 WPA World Eight-ball Championship.

At the annual doubles World Cup of Pool event, Babica has represented Poland on seven occasions (2006, 2007, 2008, 2009, 2010, 2011 and 2013) and made it to the quarter final for best result in 2009, 2010 and 2011.

== Titles ==
- 2011 Bulgarian Open
- 2001 Polish Pool Championship 8-Ball
- 2000 Polish Pool Championship 9-Ball
- 1999 Polish Pool Championship 9-Ball
