= Jharome Peña =

Filipino professional pool player

Jharome Peña is a Filipino professional pool player. During the WPA World Nine-ball Championship in 2006, he advanced to the round of 32, but was then eliminated by former world snooker champion Steve Davis of Great Britain.
