= Jeff de Luna =

Filipino pool player

Personal information
- Nickname: The Bull
- Born: February 14, 1984 (age 42) Manila

Pool career
- Country: Philippines
- Pool games: Nine-ball, ten-ball
- Best finish: Semi-finals, 2019 U.S. Open Nine-ball Championship
Medal record
Men's Nine-ball
Representing Philippines
Asian Games
Silver medal – second place	2006 Doha	Singles

Jeffrey de Luna (born February 14, 1984) is a Filipino professional pool player from Manila. De Luna reached the semifinals of the 2019 U.S. Open Pool Championship, where he lost to Joshua Filler.

De Luna is well known for his cue power and having one of the most powerful breaks of any player; hence his nickname "the Bull". He breaks the ball with tremendous power while jumping straight up into the air. In a nine-ball match against Ruslan Chinaknov, de Luna made six balls in a break shot.

== Career ==
During the 2006 Men's World Nine-ball Championship he progressed through the group stages, the round of 64 and the round of 32, but was eliminated in the round of 16 by Lương Chí Dũng. This performance secured him a spot in the 2007 edition of the tournament.

At the 2006 Asian Games in Qatar, de Luna advanced to the final of the nine-ball singles. He lost to his compatriot Antonio Gabica to finish with a silver medal. In 2009, de Luna was also a runner-up to Ricky Yang in the first-ever Philippine Open Ten-ball Championship.

In 2007, de luna recorded an 11–9 victory in an all-Filipino finals over compatriot Dennis Orcollo to win the Manny Pacquiao International Nine-ball Open held at Entertainment Center Mall of Asia, Pasay City, Philippines. The tournament had a P1-million total purse.

In 2014, the tandem of de Luna and Jeffrey Ignacio won the Manny Pacquiao International Open Doubles tournament after defeating the top-seeded pair of Thorsten Hohmann and John Morra with a score of 11–6 in the final and taking home $40,000 in prize money.

In 2019, de Luna and Carlo Biado advanced to the final of 2019 World Cup of Pool by beating the Netherlands duo of Neils Feijen and Marc Bijsterbosch, 9–6 in the semifinal but eventually fell short in the finals against Albin Ouchan and Mario He of Austria 11-3.

Also in 2019, de Luna reached the semi-finals of the 2019 U.S. Open Nine-ball Championship losing to eventual champion Joshua Filler.

== Personal life ==
De Luna is married.

== Titles and achievements ==
- 2026 Break and Run Predator Cup
- 2025 Bakersfield Open
- 2025 Indonesia International Mixed Doubles Ten-ball Open
- 2024 The Cue International Ten-ball Open
- 2024 Mansion Sports Nine-ball Open
- 2023 Quezon City Ten-ball Open
- 2022 JRX Bandung Ten-ball Open
- 2021 Sunshine State Pro Am Tour
- 2021 Sunshine State Pro Am Tour
- 2020 Meucci Classic Ten-ball
- 2020 Meucci Classic Nine-ball
- 2019 Bogies Classic Ten-ball
- 2018 Jakarta Ten-ball Open
- 2018 Sunshine State Pro-Am Tour
- 2018 Annual Cole Dickson Nine-ball
- 2017 Q City Nine-ball Tour Stop
- 2014 Manny Pacquiao Cup Ten-ball Doubles Championship
- 2011 Star Billiards Ten-ball
- 2007 Manny Pacquiao International Nine-ball Open
- 2007 World Nine-ball Challenge
