= World Cup of Pool =

Annual tournament for nine-ball pool

- Sport: Nine-ball pool
- Founded: 2006
- First season: 2006
- Most recent champions: Philippines (4th title); James Aranas / Johann Chua (2023)
- Most titles: Philippines (4 titles)
- Tournament format: Doubles team, Single-elimination

The World Cup of Pool was an annual international single-elimination tournament for doubles teams in nine-ball pool competition. The Philippines holds the record for World Cup wins, winning the title on four occasions. In 2023, they also became the first unseeded country to win the tournament.

== History ==
The tournament is held annually, at various locations, and was first held in 2006 in Newport, Wales. The tournament was hosted by Matchroom Pool but they have remained silent on why they have not produced the event since 2023.

== Format ==
There are usually 32 participating teams, representing 31 nations (the host nation is represented by two teams, A and B) composed of two players each. The participating nations do not have to go through a qualifying tournament in order to join, as they are selected by the organizers. Sixteen teams are seeded; they will face the unseeded teams at the first round.

The individual matches are scotch doubles with alternating break, which are races to seven racks for Round 1 and 2, nine racks for the quarterfinals and semifinals, and eleven for the final. The rules used are World Pool-Billiard Association (WPA) World Standardized Rules for nine-ball, modified for scotch doubles play (players on a team alternate shots; no one shoots twice in a row, unless being asked to play again after pushing out).

== Results ==
Year	Host	Final			Semi-finalists	
Year	Host	Winner	Score	Runner-up	Semi-finalists	
2006; Details	Wales (Newport)	Philippines (Reyes / Bustamante)	13–5	United States (Strickland / Morris)	Germany (Engert / Ortmann)	Vietnam (Nguyen / Luong)
2007; Details	Netherlands (Rotterdam)	China (Li / Fu)	11–10	Finland (Immonen / Juva)	Japan (Kawabata / Oi)	Canada (Martel / Montal)
2008; Details	Netherlands (Rotterdam)	United States (Morris / Van Boening)	11–7	England (Peach / Gray)	Philippines (Bustamante / Orcollo)	China (Li / Fu)
2009; Details	Philippines (Quezon City)	Philippines (Reyes / Bustamante)	11–9	Germany (Souquet / Hohmann)	China (Li / Fu)	Philippines (Alcano / Orcollo)
2010; Details	Philippines (Manila)	China (Li / Fu)	10–5	Philippines (Orcollo / Gomez)	Germany (Souquet / Ortmann)	Chinese Taipei (Pin-yi / Jung-lin)
2011; Details	Philippines (Quezon City)	Germany (Souquet / Hohmann)	10–4	Thailand (Kanjanasri / Palajin)	(South Korea); Korea (Lee / Hwang)	Chinese Taipei (Pin-yi / Ping-chung)
2012; Details	Philippines (Manila)	Finland (Immonen / Makkonen)	10–8	Poland (Skowerski / Szewczyk)	United States (Van Boening / Morris)	Chinese Taipei (Hsu / Chen)
2013; Details	England (London)	Philippines (Orcollo / Corteza)	10–8	Netherlands (Feijen / van den Berg)	Finland (Immonen / Makkonen)	Chinese Taipei (Pin-yi / Jung-lin)
2014; Details	England (Portsmouth)	England (Appleton / Boyes)	10–9	Netherlands (Feijen / van den Berg)	Finland (Immonen / Makkonen)	Austria (Ouschan / He)
2015; Details	England (London)	Chinese Taipei (Ko / Chang)	10–8	England (Gray / Peach)	Japan (Oi / Kuribayashi)	England (Appleton / Boyes)
2017; Details	England (London)	Austria (He / Ouschan)	10–6	United States (Van Boening / Woodward)	China (Wu / Dang)	Chinese Taipei (Ko / Chang)
2018; Details	China (Shanghai)	China (Wu / Liu)	10–3	Austria (He / Ouschan)	Chinese Taipei (Jung-lin / Yu-hsuan)	China (Kong / Wang)
2019; Details	England (Leicester)	Austria (He / Ouschan)	11–3	Philippines (Biado / de Luna)	Netherlands (Bijsterbosch / Feijen)	Spain (Alcaide / Sánchez Ruíz)
2021; Details	England (Milton Keynes)	Germany (Filler / Reintjes)	11–7	(United Kingdom); Great Britain (Appleton / Boyes)	Estonia (Grabe / Magi)	Slovakia (Koniar / Polách)
2022; Details	England (Brentwood)	Spain (Alcaide / Sánchez Ruíz)	11–6	Singapore (Yapp / Toh)	Chinese Taipei (Ko / Ko)	United States (Van Boening / Woodward)
2023; Details	Spain (Lugo)	Philippines (Aranas / Chua)	11–7	Germany (Filler / Neuhausen)	Austria (He / Ouschan)	China (Wu / Wang)

== Statistics ==
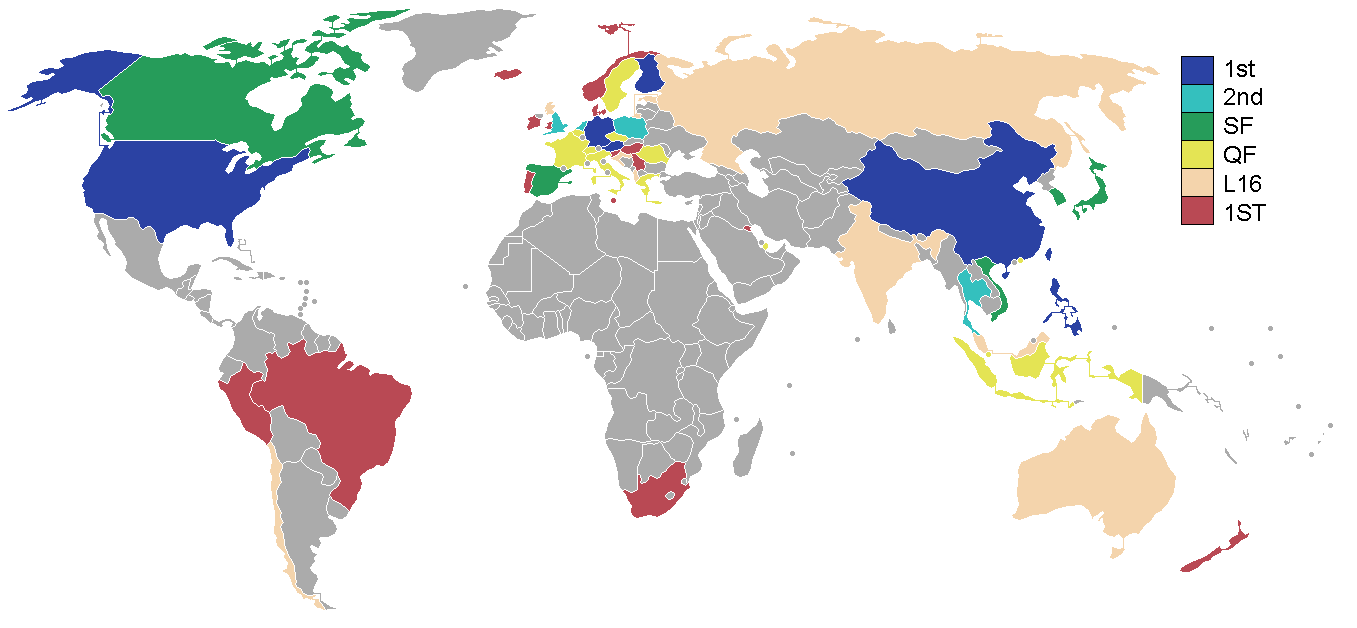
Best performances by nation (as of 2023). Not shown is Great Britain (Quarterfinals in 2019). The home nations of the United Kingdom competed separately in other editions.

=== Performances by nation ===
#	Country	Winners	Runners-up	Semi-finalists	Top 4
1	Philippines	4 (2006, 2009, 2013, 2023)	2 (2010, 2019)	2 (2008, 2009)	8
2	China	3 (2007, 2010, 2018)	—	5 (2008, 2009, 2017, 2018, 2023)	8
3	Germany	2 (2011, 2021)	2 (2009, 2023)	2 (2006, 2010)	6
4	Austria	2 (2017, 2019)	1 (2018)	2 (2014, 2023)	5
5	Great Britain^{a}	1 (2014)	3 (2008, 2015, 2021)	1 (2015)	5
6	United States	1 (2008)	2 (2006, 2017)	2 (2012, 2022)	5
7	Finland	1 (2012)	1 (2007)	2 (2013, 2014)	4
8	Chinese Taipei	1 (2015)	—	7 (2010, 2011, 2012, 2013, 2017, 2018, 2022)	8
9	Spain	1 (2022)	—	1 (2019)	2
10	Netherlands	—	2 (2013, 2014)	1 (2019)	3
11	Thailand	—	1 (2011)	—	1
11	Poland	—	1 (2012)	—	1
11	Singapore	—	1 (2022)	—	1
12	Japan	—	—	2 (2007, 2015)	2
13	Vietnam	—	—	1 (2006)	1
13	Canada	—	—	1 (2007)	1
13	(South Korea) Korea	—	—	1 (2011)	1
13	Estonia	—	—	1 (2021)	1
13	Slovakia	—	—	1 (2021)	1
Total		16	16	32	64

- ^Note a - Results include England from 2006 to 2018.

=== Performance by Continent ===
#	Continent	Winners	Runners-up	Semi-finalists	Total
1	Asia	8	4	18	30
2	Europe	7	10	11	28
3	North America	1	2	3	6
4	South America	-	-	-	-
5	Africa	-	-	-	-
6	Oceania	-	-	-	-
