= Fabio Petroni =

Italian pool player

Personal information
- Nickname: "Fabulous"
- Born: 30 March 1972 (age 54) Rome, Italy
- Website: www.fabiopetroni.net

Pool career
- Country: Italy
- Turned pro: 1998
- Pool games: 9-Ball

Tournament wins
- Minor: Euro Tour

Fabio Petroni (born 30 March 1972 in Rome, Italy) is an Italian professional pool player.

== Career ==
Fabio Petroni was born in 1972 in Rome, Italy, and began playing billiards when he was 13 years old. In 1993, he became the first Italian champion. He took second place in the World Pool League and became runner-up at the European Pool Championships 1998 in the 9-Ball. At the end of the year, he also represented Europe at the 1998 Mosconi Cup, his only appointment to the European Mosconi Cup team. In 1999, he achieved his best result in the Spanish Alicante at a World 9-Ball Championship with a place in the quarter-finals. In 2001, he won his first title on the Euro Tour in Hull. In 2006, Petroni won the 2006 Spain Open Euro Tour event in Málaga defeating Niels Feijen 10–1 in the final. In 2005, he made it to the quarter-finals of the World 8-Ball Championship - his so far best result at this tournament. At the 2015 European Pool Championships, he finished third in the 10-Ball, losing in the semi-final to runner up Francisco Díaz-Pizarro.

Petroni has participated nine times in the World Cup of Pool, reaching the quarterfinals with his partner Angelo Millauro in 2006. In the years 2007, 2008, 2009, 2010, 2012, and 2013 was his partner Bruno Muratore, however, the duo left (2007 in the first round, 2008, 2009, 2010, 2011, and 2013 in the last 16). Only in 2012 were the quarterfinals, which was lost however against the later finalists Poland. In 2014, he made the Italian team, who left the Stephan Cohen and Alex Montpellier in the first round.

Petroni has competed in Trickshot snooker, finishing second in the World Snooker Trickshot Championship in 2003 in Sunderland and in 2005 in Doncaster.

His nickname in the billiard scene is Fabulous.

== Titles ==
- 2001 Euro Tour England Open
- 2006 Euro Tour Spain Open
