= Pat Holtz =

Scottish pool player

Personal information
- Born: 27 November 1968 (age 57) Hamilton, Scotland

Pool career
- Country: Scotland
- Pool games: 9-Ball, Blackball
- Best finish: Last 16 2006 WPA World Nine-ball Championship

Tournament wins
- Minor: Scottish 9-ball Championship

Pat Holtz (born 27 November 1968) is a Scottish professional pool player.

== Career ==
=== Early life ===
He was born in Hamilton, Scotland and comes from a family of three older brothers and one younger sister, and has one daughter. Holtz has been playing pool for over twenty years and won many major honours in the game both at UK and American pool.

=== Playing career ===
In UK pool he has been the number one ranked played in Scotland and top eight ranked player in the World (WEPF) rankings. Since taking up American pool in January 2006 he has gone on to be Scottish 9-Ball champion.

During the 2006 WPA Men's World Nine-ball Championship he won his group with three wins from three in the group stages, the round of 64 and the round of 32, but was eliminated in the round of 16 by Wu Jia-qing, the defending champion. This performance secured him a spot in the 2007 edition of the tournament, but he declined his invite.

In June 2007, he was one of 16 players invited by Matchroom Sport to compete in the World Pool Masters in the Netherlands. He won games over Li He-Wen (China) and later an 8–5 victory over European top seed Niels Feijen (the Netherlands) before bowing out the event 8–5 to Mosconi Cup player David Alcaide (Spain).

He was the PPPO World Eight-ball Champion in 1996.
