= Markus Juva =

Finnish pool player, born 1975

Personal information
- Nickname: "Black Bear" "The Turtle"
- Born: 4 June 1975 (age 51) Vääksy

Pool career
- Country: Finland
- Pool games: 9-Ball, 10-ball, Straight pool

Markus Juva (born 4 June 1975 in Helsinki, Finland) is a professional Finnish pool player. At the 2007 World Cup of Pool, Juva and partner Mika Immonen reached the final, only to lose 11–10., and competed in the event on four other occasions. Juva is a several time Finnish pool champion, first winning the Finnish 8-Ball national championships in 1994.

In 2005, Juva won his only Euro Tour event, winning the Austrian Open, defeating Tony Drago in the final.

== Titles ==
- 1994 Finnish Pool Championship 8-Ball
- 2005 Euro Tour Austrian Open
