= Lương Chí Dũng =

Vietnamese pool player

Olympic medal record

Representing Vietnam

Men's Nine-ball

Southeast Asian Games
Gold medal – first place	2009 Vientiane	Doubles

Asia Pool
Bronze medal – third place	2005 Asia Pool	Single

World Pool
Bronze medal – third place	2006 World Cup of Pool	Doubles

Lương Chí Dũng (born 21 January 1985) is a Vietnamese professional pool player. He reached the quarter-finals in the 2006 Men's World Nine-ball Championship before losing to Li Hewen. In 2007 he reached the round of 32, before losing to Satoshi Kawabata from Japan.

He has won two silver medals at South East Asian Games, and made the semi-finals of the 2006 World Cup of Pool.
