= Petri Makkonen =

Finnish professional pool player (born 1988)

Personal information
- Nickname: "Petu"
- Born: 14 May 1988 (age 38)
- Website: https://www.petrimakkonen.com

Pool career
- Country: Finland
- Pool games: 9-Ball
- Current rank: 50

Petri Makkonen (born 14 May 1988) is a Finnish professional pool player. Petri won the 2012 World Cup of Pool with partner Mika Immonen. Petri also won the 2015 German Open Euro Tour event, defeating Konrad Juszczyszyn 9–3 in the final.

At the European Pool Championships, Makkonen was the runner-up at the 10-Ball event, losing to David Alcaide, losing in the final 8–7.

== Titles & Achievements ==
- 2024 Orangeforks Nine-ball Open
- 2020 Finnish Pool Championship 10-Ball
- 2017 Finnish Pool Championship 8-Ball
- 2017 Finnish Pool Championship 10-Ball
- 2016 Finnish Pool Championship 9-Ball
- 2015 Euro Tour German Open
- 2014 Finnish Pool Championship 10-Ball
- 2014 Finnish Pool Championship 8-Ball
- 2013 Finnish Pool Championship 14.1
- 2012 World Cup of Pool - With (Mika Immonen)
- 2012 Finnish Pool Championship 10-Ball
- 2012 Finnish Pool Championship 8-Ball
- 2011 Finnish Pool Championship 14.1
- 2010 Finnish Pool Championship 14.1
