= Nick van den Berg =

Dutch pool player (born 1980)

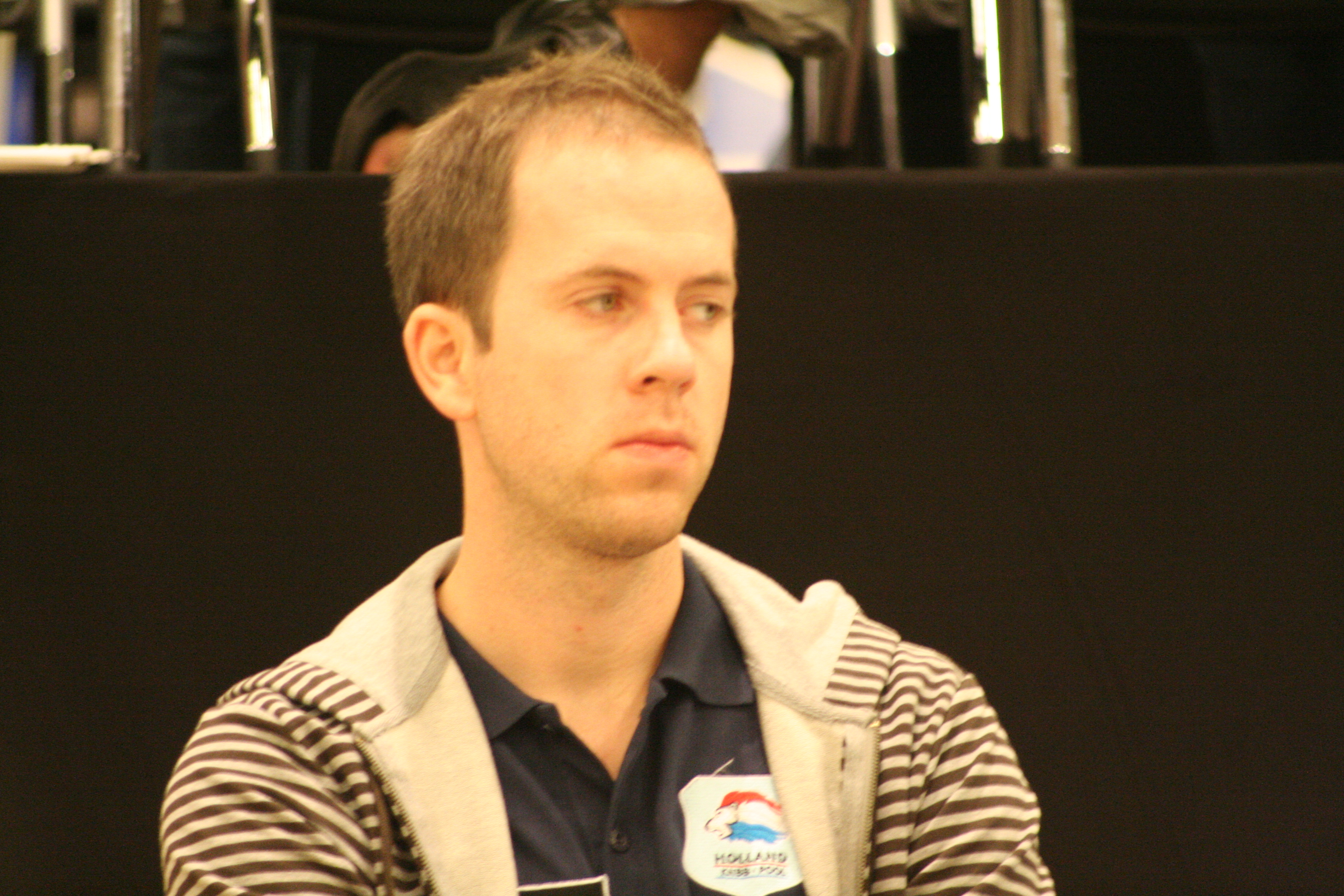
- Van den Berg at the 2008 European Championship

Personal information
- Nickname: El Nino
- Born: 24 May 1980 (age 46) Amsterdam, Netherlands
- Website: http://www.nickvandenberg.com

Pool career
- Country: Netherlands
- Turned pro: 2000
- Pool games: nine-ball, eight-ball
- Best finish: Quarter finals 2005 WPA World Nine-ball Championship

Nick van den Berg (born 24 May 1980) is a Dutch professional pool player. He was the runner up at the 2005 WPA World Eight-ball Championship, where he lost to Wu Jia-qing 11–5 in the final. He is a multiple time winner of events on the Euro Tour, winning 10 tournaments between 2002 and 2017, the fourth highest in the history of the tour. A six-time winner of the European Pool Championships, Van den Berg has represented Europe at the Mosconi Cup on eight occasions, winning the event on six occasions as well as tying the event in 2006.

== Career ==
Van den Berg's best performance in a world championship was in 2005, where he reached the final of the WPA World Eight-ball Championship. At the event, he defeated Christian Reimering 10–4, Naif Aljaweni 10–4 and Francisco Bustamante 10–8 on route to a final against Wu Jia-qing. Chia-ching would win the final 11–5, who won both the nine-ball and eight-ball world championships in the same season.

Van den Berg has won ten events on the Euro Tour, with a further five silver and six bronze medals. He won his first medal at a Euro Tour event in 2000, where he finished runner-up to Johnny Archer at the 2000 Italy Open. He won his first event two years later in 2002 winning the Austrian Open. In both 2002, and 2006 van den Berg was the most successful player, scoring the most ranking points over those two seasons. Van den Berg's last tournament victory came at the 2017 Portugal Open, having not won an event since 2014. At the event, he defeated Konrad Juszczyszyn 9–5, Witalij Pazura 9–8, Tomasz Kapłan 9–6 and Mark Gray (9–3) to reach the final. There, he faced David Alcaide, where he won 9–5.

At the World Cup of Pool, van den Berg has partnered Niels Feijen on several occasions to make a Dutch team. At the 2013 World Cup of Pool, the pair defeated Scotland 7–2, India 7–5, Japan 9-8 and Finland 9–4 to play Dennis Orcollo and Lee Vann Corteza in the final. The pair led the final 7–3, but eventually lost the match 8–10. The following year, they reached the final again, after a 9–1 victory in the semi-finals. In the final, they played Karl Boyes and Darren Appleton, and lead at both 6-3 and 9–7, but lost on a deciding rack 10–9.

Van den Berg represented Europe at the Mosconi Cup eight times between 2002 and 2017. He made his debut in the competition in 2002, in what was Europe's first win since the 1995 Mosconi Cup. In participating in the 2002 edition, aged 22, he was the youngest player to compete at the Mosconi Cup, until American Skyler Woodward in 2015. At the event, he won three matches, including a 5–0 win partnering with Steve Davis, and losing twice. He returned for the 2003 Mosconi Cup, but would only play in the 2006 edition before rejoining at 2010 Mosconi Cup for three seasons. He later also played in the 2015 and 2017 events. In total, van den Berg has played in eight Mosconi Cup events, winning six, losing one in 2003 and tying one in 2006.

Van den Berg has won the European Pool Championships on six occasions. He won the straight pool event in 2012, 2013 and 2015 nine-ball event in 2009 and 2011, Eight-ball in 2014, and straight pool in 2012, 2013 and 2015.

Van den Berg lives in the Netherlands, and plays for Club 8, Amsterdam. Van den Berg has not officially retired from pool, and he has his own pool bar in Amsterdam, Amstel called Mokum Pool and Darts.

He most recently play at the Orange Forks competition in Lelystad

== Titles ==
- 2017 Mosconi Cup
- 2017 Euro Tour Portugal Open
- 2015 Mosconi Cup
- 2015 European Pool Championship 14.1
- 2014 Euro Tour Treviso Open
- 2014 Euro Tour Italian Open
- 2014 European Pool Championship 8-Ball
- 2013 Euro Tour Treviso Open
- 2013 European Pool Championship 14.1
- 2012 Mosconi Cup
- 2012 Euro Tour European Open
- 2012 European Pool Championship 14.1
- 2011 Mosconi Cup
- 2011 European Pool Championship 9-Ball
- 2010 Mosconi Cup
- 2010 Euro Tour Finland Open
- 2009 European Pool Championship 9-Ball
- 2008 Euro Tour Austrian Open
- 2006 Euro Tour Czech Open
- 2005 Euro Tour German Open
- 2004 Modena Best Cup 9-Ball
- 2002 Mosconi Cup
- 2002 Euro Tour Austria Open
