= Albin Ouschan =

Austrian pool player (born 1990)

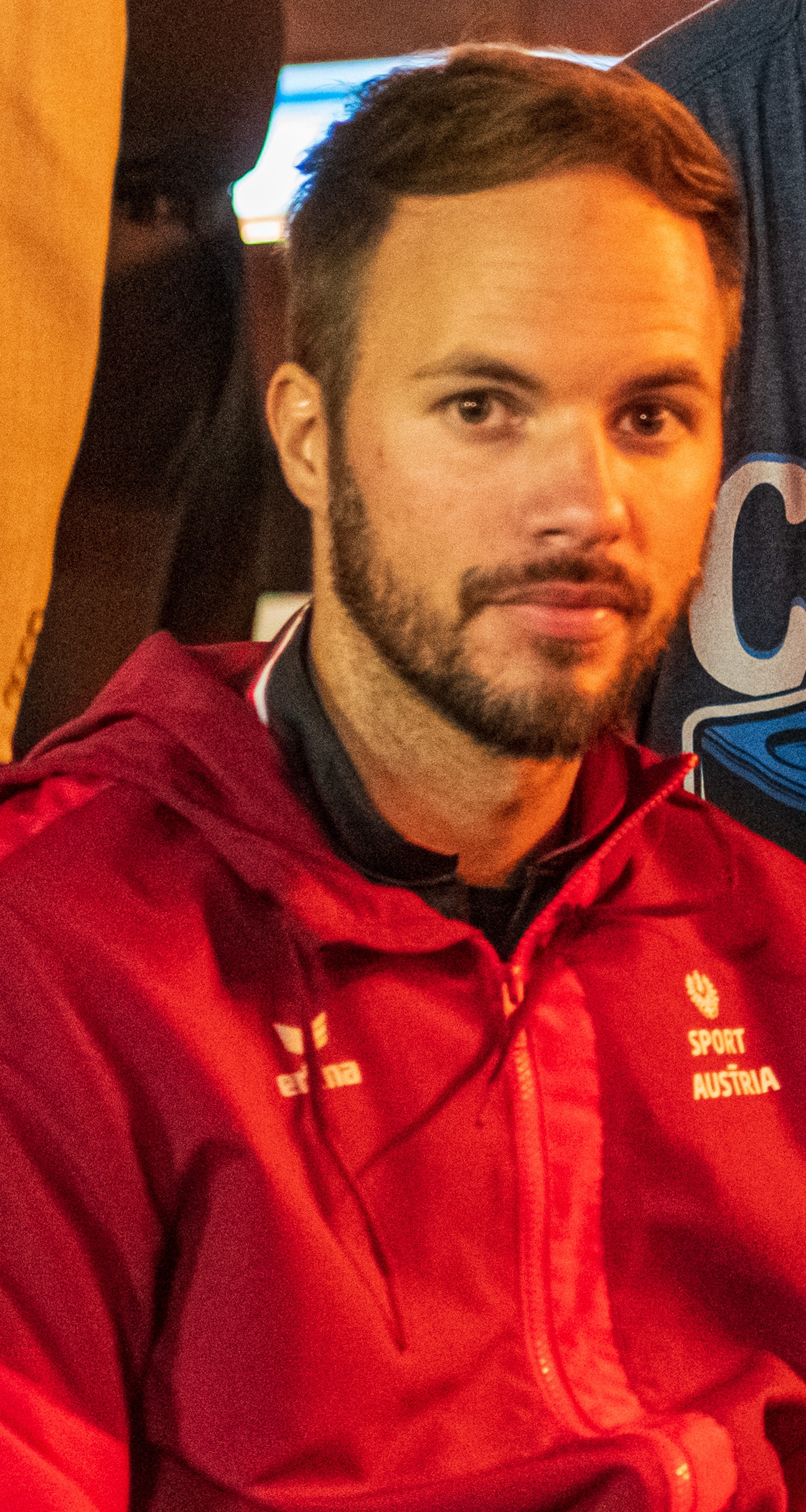
- Albin Ouschan at the 2022 Straight Pool tournament, October 26, 2022

Personal information
- Nickname: "Smooth Operator"
- Born: 14 August 1990 (age 36) Klagenfurt, Carinthia, Austria

Pool career
- Country: Austria
- Turned pro: 2007
- Pool games: Nine-ball, Straight pool, Eight-ball

Tournament wins
- World Champion: Nine-ball (2016, 2021), Eight-ball (2025)
- Current rank: 9
- Highest rank: 1

Albin Alois Ouschan (born August 14, 1990) is an Austrian professional pool player. Ouschan was the 2016 WPA World Nine-ball Championship winner, as well as the runner-up in 2014. He also won the 14.1 Continuous European championship the same year. Ouschan is a multiple time Austrian champion in 8-ball, ten-ball and straight pool. Ouschan alongside partner Mario He won both the 2017 World Cup of Pool, 2019 World Cup of Pool and reached the final of the 2018 World Cup of Pool. They would lose 10–3 to the Chinese team of Wu Jia-qing & Liu Haitao. He won the WPA World Nine-ball Championship for the second time in 2021, beating Omar Al-Shaheen 13–9 in the final. He won the International Open in 2021, defeating Dennis Orcollo 13–6 in the final. He is the younger brother of Jasmin Ouschan.

In 2023 Ouschan won his sixth Mosconi Cup whilst representing Team Europe. They defeated Team USA at the Alexandra Palace, London.

== Titles and achievements ==
- 2026 Euro Tour Austrian Open
- 2025 WPA World Eight-ball Championship
- 2024 Marina Nine-ball Open
- 2023 Mosconi Cup
- 2022 Mosconi Cup
- 2022 European Open 9-ball Championship
- 2022 Premier League Pool
- 2021 AZBilliards Player of the Year
- 2021 Mosconi Cup
- 2021 International 9-Ball Open
- 2021 Championship League Pool
- 2021 WPA World Nine-ball Championship
- 2020 Mosconi Cup
- 2019 World Cup of Pool - with (Mario He)
- 2017 World Cup of Pool - with (Mario He)
- 2016 EPBF Player of the Year
- 2016 Mosconi Cup Most Valuable Player (MVP)
- 2016 Mosconi Cup
- 2016 WPA World Nine-ball Championship
- 2016 European Pool Championship 14.1
- 2015 Mosconi Cup
- 2015 Kings Cup 10-Ball Team East vs. West
- 2015 China Open 9-Ball Championship
- 2015 Euro Tour Dutch Open
- 2012 Euro Tour Bosnia Open
- 2011 Austrian Pool Championship 14.1
- 2010 Austrian Pool Championship 14.1
- 2009 Austrian Pool Championship 9-Ball
- 2008 Austrian Pool Championship 9-Ball
- 2007 Austrian Pool Championship 9-Ball
- 2006 Austrian Pool Championship 14.1
- 2006 Austrian Pool Championship 8-Ball
- 2006 Austrian Pool Championship 9-Ball
- 2005 Austrian Pool Championship 14.1
- 2005 Austrian Pool Championship 8-Ball
- 2004 Austrian Pool Championship 9-Ball
