= John Morra =

Canadian pool player

Personal information
- Nickname: "Mr. Smooth"
- Born: 25 May 1989 (age 37)

Pool career
- Country: Canada
- Turned pro: 2006
- Pool games: 9-Ball, 10-Ball
- Best finish: Quarter finals 2015 WPA World Nine-ball Championship

John Morra (born May 25, 1989) is a Canadian professional pool player. Morra has represented Canada at the World Cup of Pool on seven occasions, partnering Jason Klatt in 2011, 2012 and 2015, and Alex Pagulayan in 2013, 2014, 2017 and 2019. Morra is a multiple time champion on the Canadian 9-Ball pool tour. He reached the quarter-finals of the 2010 World Pool Masters. In 2018, Morra switched from playing right handed to left handed due to a shoulder injury. However, he still breaks with a right-handed stroke, as he is unable to generate the required amount of power breaking left-handed.

== Personal life ==
Morra began playing tournament pool in Toronto, Ontario, where his family moved to when he was ten years old. Both his parents, Mario Morra and Anita McMahon, have played professional pool and snooker.

== Titles ==
- 2026 Bayou State Classic Nine-ball Bar table
- 2026 U.S. Open Bank Pool Championship
- 2026 U.S. Open Ten-ball Championship
- 2026 Turning Stone Classic
- 2025 Canadian Ten-ball Championship
- 2025 Ontario 9-Ball Championship
- 2025 Canadian Eight-ball Championship
- 2024 Canadian Nine-ball Championship
- 2024 Canadian Ten-ball Championship
- 2024 Canadian Nine-ball Championship
- 2024 Jay Swanson Memorial Nine-ball
- 2022 Hex.com Pro Am Ten-ball
- 2021 National Billiards League Ten-ball Championship
- 2021 Southeastern Triple Crown One Pocket
- 2017 Canadian Nine-ball Championship
- 2017 Texas Open Nine-ball Championship
- 2016 Canadian Ten-ball Championship
- 2016 Super Billiards Expo Players Championship
- 2016 Hard Times Ten-ball Open
- 2016 Texas Open Nine-ball Championship
- 2015 Canadian Ten-ball Championship
- 2015 Canadian Eight-ball Championship
- 2015 Canadian Nine-ball Championship
- 2014 Canadian Eight-ball Championship
- 2013 Canadian Ten-ball Championship
- 2013 Canadian Nine-ball Championship
- 2012 Canadian Ten-ball Championship
- 2012 Derby City Classic Bank Pool
- 2011 CSI US Bar Table Eight-ball Championship
- 2010 Canadian Ten-ball Championship
- 2009 Canadian Nine-ball Championship
- 2007 Canadian 9-Ball Tour
- 2004 BCA Junior 9-Ball Championship
