= 2015 WPA World Nine-ball Championship =

9-Ball pool World Championships

WPA World 9-Ball Championship 2015
Tournament information
- Sport: 9-ball
- Location: al-Arabi Sports Club, Doha, Qatar
- Dates: September 7, 2015–September 18, 2015
- Tournament format: Double elimination / Single elimination
- Host: WPA World Nine-ball Championship
- Participants: 128

Final positions
- Champion: (Chinese Taipei) Ko Pin-yi
- Runner-up: (United States) Shane Van Boening

The 2015 WPA World Nine-ball Championship was the 24th edition of the 9-Ball pool World Championships. It took place from September 7 to 18, 2015 in the al-Attiya Sports Arena of the Al-Arabi Sports Club in Doha. The Qatari capital was the sixth time in a row the venue for the 9-Ball Championships.

The event was won by Ko Pin-yi of Chinese Taipei, who defeated America's Shane Van Boening in the final, with a score of 13 racks to 11.

Niels Feijen was the defending champion, however, he did not make it past the preliminary round of the tournament.

== Format ==
From September 7 to 10, a qualifying tournament took place in which 128 participants played in three knockout competitions, for twelve starting places. The remaining 116 starting positions were previously awarded via the world rankings or according to a quota from the continental federations, the Qatari federation and as wildcard places by the WPA.

The 128 qualified for the main tournament players were initially divided into 16 groups. From September 12 to 15 these groups played in a double elimination tournament. From each group four players qualified for the final round, which took place from September 16 to 18 and was played in a knockout system. The event was played with the alternating break format. The goal was to play seven games in qualifying, nine games in the preliminary round, eleven games in the final round and 13 games in the final.

=== Prize money ===
	Amount
Winner	$30,000
Runner Up	$15,000
Semifinal	$7,500
Quarter final	$5,000
Last 16	$3.,000
Last 32	$2,000
Last 64	$1,500
65.–96. Place	$500
Total	200.000

== Preliminary round ==
=== Group 1 ===
Main Round
(Austria) Albin Ouschan	9
(Egypt) Khaled Farag	5
(Japan) Satoshi Kawabata	9
(United States) Hunter Lombardo	6
(Qatar) Bashar Hussain	9
(Indonesia) Irsal Nasution	5
(Russia) Konstantin Stepanov	7
(Chinese Taipei) Wu Kun-lin	9
1st playoff round
(Egypt) Khaled Farag	5
(United States) Hunter Lombardo	9
(Indonesia) Irsal Nasution	9
(Russia) Konstantin Stepanov	5

Winner’s Round
(Austria) Albin Ouschan	8
(Japan) Satoshi Kawabata	9
(Qatar) Bashar Hussain	4
(Chinese Taipei) Wu Kun-lin	9
2nd playoff round
(United States) Hunter Lombardo	9
(Qatar) Bashar Hussain	8
(Indonesia) Irsal Nasution	8
(Austria) Albin Ouschan	9

=== Group 2 ===
Main Round
(China) Wang Can	9
(Japan) Tōru Kuribayashi	6
(Netherlands) Marc Bijsterbosch	9
(Qatar) Mohd Al Bin Ali	4
(Poland) Radosław Babica	9
(Kuwait) Abdullah al-Yousef	3
(Mexico) Rubén Bautista	9
(Kuwait) Bader al-Awadhi	7
1st playoff round
(Japan) Tōru Kuribayashi	9
(Qatar) Mohd Al Bin Ali	8
(Kuwait) Abdullah al-Yousef	9
(Kuwait) Bader al-Awadhi	6

Winner’s Round
(China) Wang Can	9
(Netherlands) Marc Bijsterbosch	4
(Poland) Radosław Babica	8
(Mexico) Rubén Bautista	9
2nd playoff round
(Japan) Tōru Kuribayashi	9
(Poland) Radosław Babica	8
(Kuwait) Abdullah al-Yousef	8
(Netherlands) Marc Bijsterbosch	9

=== Group 3 ===
Main Round
(China) Li Hewen	9
(Czech Republic) Roman Hybler	8
(Australia) Justin Campbell	9
(Iran) Mehdi Rasekhi	2
(Qatar) Waleed Majid	6
(Chinese Taipei) Yang Ching-shun	9
(Spain) Francisco Sánchez	8
(Japan) Yukio Akakariyama	9
1st playoff round
(Czech Republic) Roman Hybler	7
(Iran) Mehdi Rasekhi	9
(Qatar) Waleed Majid	9
(Spain) Francisco Sánchez	5

Winner’s Round
(China) Li Hewen	9
(Australia) Justin Campbell	2
(Chinese Taipei) Yang Ching-shun	6
(Japan) Yukio Akakariyama	9
2nd playoff round
(Iran) Mehdi Rasekhi	5
(Chinese Taipei) Yang Ching-shun	9
(Qatar) Waleed Majid	5
(Australia) Justin Campbell	9

=== Group 4 ===
Main Round
(Philippines) Raymund Faraon	9
(South Africa) Francois Ellis	3
(Iran) Pordel Mohammadali	9
(Qatar) Mohammed Saeed	6
(Greece) Nikos Ekonomopoulos	9
(Maldives) Mohamed Shareef	1
(Netherlands) Marco Teutscher	7
(China) Zhou Long	9
1st playoff round
(South Africa) Francois Ellis	3
(Qatar) Mohammed Saeed	9
(Maldives) Mohamed Shareef	0
(Netherlands) Marco Teutscher	9

Winner’s Round
(Philippines) Raymund Faraon	9
(Iran) Pordel Mohammadali	4
(Greece) Nikos Ekonomopoulos	9
(China) Zhou Long	6
2nd playoff round
(Qatar) Mohammed Saeed	5
(China) Zhou Long	9
(Netherlands) Marco Teutscher	9
(Iran) Pordel Mohammadali	3

=== Group 5 ===
Main Round
(Philippines) Warren Kiamco	9
(Norway) Vegar Kristiansen	2
(South Korea) Jeong Young-hwa	2
(Poland) Wojciech Szewczyk	9
(China) Wu Jia-qing	9
(Canada) Shannon Ducharme	5
(Qatar) Mohanna Obaidly	2
(Philippines) Oliver Medenilla	9
1st playoff round
(Norway) Vegar Kristiansen	9
(South Korea) Jeong Young-hwa	7
(Canada) Shannon Ducharme	9
(Qatar) Mohanna Obaidly	8

Winner’s Round
(Philippines) Warren Kiamco	5
(Poland) Wojciech Szewczyk	9
(China) Wu Jia-qing	9
(Philippines) Oliver Medenilla	2
2nd playoff round
(Norway) Vegar Kristiansen	6
(Philippines) Oliver Medenilla	9
(Canada) Shannon Ducharme	6
(Philippines) Warren Kiamco	9

=== Group 6 ===
Main Round
(Chinese Taipei) Chang Jung-lin	8
(Germany) Ralf Souquet	9
(Poland) Mateusz Śniegocki	9
(Palestine) Mohammad Sharif	8
(Philippines) Johann Chua	9
(Qatar) Ali Obaidly	7
(Algeria) Hichem Benaissa	3
(Saudi Arabia) Abdul Rahman al-Amar	9
1st playoff round
(Chinese Taipei) Chang Jung-lin	9
(Sudan) Mohammad Sharif	4
(Qatar) Ali Obaidly	9
(Algeria) Hichem Benaissa	3

Winner’s Round
(Germany) Ralf Souquet	1
(Poland) Mateusz Śniegocki	9
(Philippines) Johann Chua	7
(Saudi Arabia) Abdul Rahman al-Amar	9
2nd playoff round
(Chinese Taipei) Chang Jung-lin	6
(Philippines) Johann Chua	9
(Qatar) Ali Obaidly	5
(Germany) Ralf Souquet	9

=== Group 7 ===
Main Round
(Netherlands) Nick van den Berg	5
(Japan) Naoyuki Ōi	9
(Canada) Tom Teriault	9
(Qatar) Abdultif Fawal	7
(Philippines) Lee Vann Corteza	6
(Russia) Ruslan Chinakhov	9
(United Arab Emirates) Mohamed al-Hosani	8
(Chinese Taipei) Liu Cheng-chieh	9
1st playoff round
(Netherlands) Nick van den Berg	9
(Qatar) Abdultif Fawal	3
(Philippines) Lee Vann Corteza	9
(United Arab Emirates) Mohamed al-Hosani	7

Winner’s Round
(Japan) Naoyuki Ōi	9
(Canada) Tom Teriault	2
(Russia) Ruslan Chinakhov	4
(Chinese Taipei) Liu Cheng-chieh	9
2nd playoff round
(Netherlands) Nick van den Berg	4
(Russia) Ruslan Chinakhov	9
(Philippines) Lee Vann Corteza	9
(Canada) Tom Teriault	2

=== Group 8 ===
Main Round
(England) Daryl Peach	9
(Indonesia) Muhammad Simanjuntak	2
(United States) Mike Dechaine	9
(Chile) Alejandro Carvajal	4
(Philippines) Carlo Biado	9
(Bahrain) Fahad Khalaf	6
(Italy) Daniele Corrieri	9
(Qatar) Mishel Turkey	6
1st playoff round
(Indonesia) M. Simanjuntak	9
(Chile) Alejandro Carvajal	5
(Bahrain) Fahad Khalaf	5
(Qatar) Mishel Turkey	9

Winner’s Round
(England) Daryl Peach	5
(United States) Mike Dechaine	9
(Philippines) Carlo Biado	9
(Italy) Daniele Corrieri	5
2nd playoff round
(Indonesia) M. Simanjuntak	9
(Italy) Daniele Corrieri	7
(Qatar) Mishel Turkey	9
(England) Daryl Peach	5

=== Group 9 ===
Main Round
(Chinese Taipei) Ko Pin-yi	9
(Estonia) Denis Grabe	4
(South Africa) Rajandran Nair	6
(Norway) Matey Ullah	9
(Finland) Mika Immonen	9
(Philippines) Amir Rota	4
(Germany) Oliver Ortmann	9
(China) Zhu Xihe	2
1st playoff round
(Estonia) Denis Grabe	9
(South Africa) Rajandran Nair	4
(Philippines) Amir Rota	8
(China) Zhu Xihe	9

Winner’s Round
(Chinese Taipei) Ko Pin-yi	9
(Norway) Matey Ullah	6
(Finland) Mika Immonen	9
(Germany) Oliver Ortmann	5
2nd playoff round
(Estonia) Denis Grabe	9
(Germany) Oliver Ortmann	7
(China) Zhu Xihe	6
(Norway) Matey Ullah	9

=== Group 10 ===
Main Round
(Chinese Taipei) Ko Ping-chung	9
(Sweden) Marcus Chamat	5
(Peru) Christopher Tevez	9
(Chinese Taipei) Cheng Yu-hsuan	5
(United States) Shane Van Boening	9
(United Arab Emirates) Omran Salem	6
(Pakistan) Hassan Shafraz	1
(England) Richard Jones	9
1st playoff round
(Sweden) Marcus Chamat	6
(Chinese Taipei) Cheng Yu-hsuan	9
(United Arab Emirates) Omran Salem	9
(Pakistan) Hassan Shafraz	8

Winner’s Round
(Chinese Taipei) Ko Ping-chung	9
(Peru) Christopher Tevez	2
(United States) Shane Van Boening	9
(England) Richard Jones	5
2nd playoff round
(Chinese Taipei) Cheng Yu-hsuan	9
(England) Richard Jones	6
(United Arab Emirates) Omran Salem	9
(Peru) Christopher Tevez	7

=== Group 11 ===
Main Round
(Canada) John Morra	9
(Austria) Mario He	8
(Singapore) Toh Lian Han	9
(Lebanon) Mazen Berjaoui	6
(China) Chu Bingjie	3
(Spain) David Alcaide	9
(Egypt) Hesam Abdulaziz	9
(United Arab Emirates) Khalid Yousuf	8
1st playoff round
(Austria) Mario He	9
(Lebanon) Mazen Berjaoui	6
(China) Chu Bingjie	9
(United Arab Emirates) Khalid Yousuf	6

Winner’s Round
(Canada) John Morra	9
(Singapore) Toh Lian Han	4
(Spain) David Alcaide	9
(Egypt) Hesam Abdulaziz	6
2nd playoff round
(Austria) Mario He	9
(Egypt) Hesam Abdulaziz	2
(China) Chu Bingjie	8
(Singapore) Toh Lian Han	9

=== Group 12 ===
Main Round
(China) Dang Jinhu	9
(South Korea) Ryu Seung-woo	5
(Eritrea) Hamzaa Saeed Ali	5
(Poland) Tomasz Kapłan	9
(Netherlands) Niels Feijen	9
(Philippines) Francisco Felicilda	4
(Greece) Alexander Kazakis	9
(Lebanon) Mohammad Berjaoui	1
1st playoff round
(South Korea) Ryu Seung-woo	9
(Eritrea) Hamzaa Saeed Ali	2
(Philippines) Francisco Felicilda	9
(Lebanon) Mohammad Berjaoui	7

Winner’s Round
(China) Dang Jinhu	9
(Poland) Tomasz Kapłan	4
(Netherlands) Niels Feijen	8
(Greece) Alexander Kazakis	9
2nd playoff round
(South Korea) Ryu Seung-woo	9
(Netherlands) Niels Feijen	8
(Philippines) Francisco Felicilda	7
(Poland) Tomasz Kapłan	9

=== Group 13 ===
Main Round
(Philippines) Dennis Orcollo	9
(Spain) Francisco Díaz-Pizarro	4
(Bangladesh) Hosain Sayeem	9
(Saudi Arabia) Fahad al-Hejeli	7
(Germany) Thorsten Hohmann	9
(Jordan) Nizar Mosbah Tamimi	3
(Singapore) Goh Chin Teck	7
(Venezuela) Jalal Yousef	9
1st playoff round
(Spain) Francisco Díaz-Pizarro	9
(Saudi Arabia) Fahad al-Hejeli	3
(Jordan) Nizar Mosbah Tamimi	5
(Singapore) Goh Chin Teck	9

Winner’s Round
(Philippines) Dennis Orcollo	9
(Bangladesh) Hosain Sayeem	6
(Germany) Thorsten Hohmann	8
(Venezuela) Jalal Yousef	9
2nd playoff round
(Spain) Francisco Díaz-Pizarro	9
(Germany) Thorsten Hohmann	4
(Singapore) Goh Chin Teck	9
(Bangladesh) Hosain Sayeem	5

=== Group 14 ===
Main Round
(England) Karl Boyes	5
(Hong Kong) Lo Ho Sum	9
(England) Imran Majid	9
(Bahrain) Sameer al-Madhi	4
(China) Liu Haitao	5
(Chinese Taipei) Chao Fong-Pang	9
(Poland) Karol Skowerski	9
(Kuwait) Meshal al-Murdhi	4
1st playoff round
(England) Karl Boyes	9
(Bahrain) Sameer al-Madhi	2
(China) Liu Haitao	9
(Kuwait) Meshal al-Murdhi	2

Winner’s Round
(Hong Kong) Lo Ho Sum	6
(England) Imran Majid	9
(Chinese Taipei) Chao Fong-Pang	8
(Poland) Karol Skowerski	9
2nd playoff round
(England) Karl Boyes	7
(Chinese Taipei) Chao Fong-Pang	9
(China) Liu Haitao	9
(Hong Kong) Lo Ho Sum	5

=== Group 15 ===
Main Round
(Chinese Taipei) Chang Yu-Lung	9
(India) Sundeep Gulati	4
(Finland) Petri Makkonen	8
(New Zealand) Matthew Edwards	9
(Canada) Jason Klatt	9
(Iraq) Ali Hussein Ali	4
(Sweden) Andreas Gerwen	7
(Philippines) Jeffrey Ignacio	9
1st playoff round
(India) Sundeep Gulati	8
(Finland) Petri Makkonen	9
(Iraq) Ali Hussein Ali	4
(Sweden) Andreas Gerwen	9

Winner’s Round
(Chinese Taipei) Chang Yu-Lung	9
(New Zealand) Matthew Edwards	3
(Canada) Jason Klatt	6
(Philippines) Jeffrey Ignacio	9
2nd playoff round
(Finland) Petri Makkonen	2
(Canada) Jason Klatt	9
(Sweden) Andreas Gerwen	9
(New Zealand) Matthew Edwards	7

=== Group 16 ===
Main Round
(Philippines) Antonio Gabica	9
(Kuwait) Omar Al-Shaheen	3
(Bangladesh) Sinha Fahim	9
(Saudi Arabia) Bader al-Hamdan	3
(England) Darren Appleton	5
(Singapore) Aloysius Yapp	9
(England) Mark Gray	9
(Egypt) Mohamed Elmola	1
1st playoff round
(Kuwait) Omar Al-Shaheen	9
(Saudi Arabia) Bader al-Hamdan	4
(England) Darren Appleton	9
(Egypt) Mohamed Elmola	3

Winner’s Round
(Philippines) Antonio Gabica	9
(Bangladesh) Sinha Fahim	6
(Singapore) Aloysius Yapp	7
(England) Mark Gray	9
2nd playoff round
(Kuwait) Omar Al-Shaheen	5
(Singapore) Aloysius Yapp	9
(England) Darren Appleton	9
(Bangladesh) Sinha Fahim	2

== Knockout round ==
Round of 64
(Philippines) Raymund Faraon	9
(Philippines) Warren Kiamco	11
(Venezuela) Jalal Yousef	11
(China) Zhou Long	10
(Philippines) Carlo Biado	11
(Philippines) Lee Vann Corteza	5
(Chinese Taipei) Ko Pin-yi	11
(Australia) Justin Campbell	7
(Finland) Mika Immonen	11
(Singapore) Goh Chin Teck	3
(Chinese Taipei) Wu Kun-lin	11
(South Korea) Ryu Seung-woo	9
(Canada) John Morra	11
(United Arab Emirates) Omran Salem	2
(England) Mark Gray	11
(Germany) Ralf Souquet	10
(Japan) Naoyuki Ōi	9
(Singapore) Aloysius Yapp	11
(Philippines) Jeffrey Ignacio	11
(Canada) Jason Klatt	5
(England) Imran Majid	10
(China) Liu Haitao	11
(Greece) Alexander Kazakis	11
(Chinese Taipei) Chao Fong-Pang	10
(Philippines) Antonio Gabica	5
(Russia) Ruslan Chinakhov	11
(China) Wang Can	11
(Japan) Tōru Kuribayashi	7
(Japan) Satoshi Kawabata	7
(Austria) Albin Ouschan	11
(China) Wu Jia-qing	11
(Indonesia) Muhammad Simanjuntak	3
(Chinese Taipei) Ko Ping-chung	11
(Austria) Mario He	5
(Japan) Yukio Akakariyama	11
(Philippines) Johann Chua	5
(China) Li Hewen	7
(Estonia) Denis Grabe	11
(United States) Mike Dechaine	11
(Chinese Taipei) Cheng Yu-hsuan	10
(Spain) David Alcaide	11
(Chinese Taipei) Yang Ching-shun	8
(Saudi Arabia) Abdul Rahman al-Amar	8
(Singapore) Toh Lian Han	11
(Chinese Taipei) Liu Cheng-chieh	11
(Sweden) Andreas Gerwen	5
(Poland) Wojciech Szewczyk	11
(Netherlands) Marco Teutscher	8
(Chinese Taipei) Chang Yu-Lung	11
(Netherlands) Marc Bijsterbosch	4
(Poland) Karol Skowerski	4
(Philippines) Oliver Medenilla	11
(United States) Shane Van Boening	11
(Poland) Tomasz Kapłan	3
(China) Dang Jinhu	10
(Spain) Francisco Díaz-Pizarro	11
(Poland) Mateusz Śniegocki	10
(United States) Hunter Lombardo	11
(Philippines) Dennis Orcollo	11
(Qatar) Mishel Turkey	1
(Mexico) Rubén Bautista	3
(England) Darren Appleton	11
(Greece) Nikos Ekonomopoulos	11
(Norway) Matey Ullah	7

Round of 32
(Philippines) Warren Kiamco	11
(Venezuela) Jalal Yousef	7
(Philippines) Carlo Biado	4
(Chinese Taipei) Ko Pin-yi	11
(Finland) Mika Immonen	11
(Chinese Taipei) Wu Kun-lin	9
(Canada) John Morra	11
(England) Mark Gray	10
(Singapore) Aloysius Yapp	11
(Philippines) Jeffrey Ignacio	6
(China) Liu Haitao	9
(Greece) Alexander Kazakis	11
(Russia) Ruslan Chinakhov	7
(China) Wang Can	11
(Austria) Albin Ouschan	6
(China) Wu Jia-qing	11
(Chinese Taipei) Ko Ping-chung	11
(Japan) Yukio Akakariyama	9
(Estonia) Denis Grabe	10
(United States) Mike Dechaine	11
(Spain) David Alcaide	11
(Singapore) Toh Lian Han	7
(Chinese Taipei) Liu Cheng-chieh	8
(Poland) Wojciech Szewczyk	11
(Chinese Taipei) Chang Yu-Lung	11
(Philippines) Oliver Medenilla	4
(United States) Shane Van Boening	11
(Spain) Francisco Díaz-Pizarro	5
(United States) Hunter Lombardo	7
(Philippines) Dennis Orcollo	11
(England) Darren Appleton	11
(Greece) Nikos Ekonomopoulos	7

Round of 16
(Philippines) Warren Kiamco	9
(Chinese Taipei) Ko Pin-yi	11
(Finland) Mika Immonen	8
(Canada) John Morra	11
(Singapore) Aloysius Yapp	11
(Greece) Alexander Kazakis	10
(China) Wang Can	9
(China) Wu Jia-qing	11
(Chinese Taipei) Ko Ping-chung	11
(United States) Mike Dechaine	9
(Spain) David Alcaide	10
(Poland) Wojciech Szewczyk	11
(Chinese Taipei) Chang Yu-Lung	5
(United States) Shane Van Boening	11
(Philippines) Dennis Orcollo	11
(England) Darren Appleton	2

Quarter finals
(Chinese Taipei) Ko Pin-yi	11
(Canada) John Morra	6
(Singapore) Aloysius Yapp	7
(China) Wu Jia-qing	11
(Chinese Taipei) Ko Ping-chung	11
(Poland) Wojciech Szewczyk	5
(United States) Shane Van Boening	11
(Philippines) Dennis Orcollo	1

Semi finals
(Chinese Taipei) Ko Pin-yi	11
(China) Wu Jia-qing	10
(Chinese Taipei) Ko Ping-chung	1
(United States) Shane Van Boening	11

Final
(Chinese Taipei) Ko Pin-yi	13
(United States) Shane Van Boening	11

Player	Lag	Rack																								Racks won
Player	Lag	1	2	3	4	5	6	7	8	9	10	11	12	13	14	15	16	17	18	19	20	21	22	23	24	Racks won
(Chinese Taipei) Ko Pin-yi	•	1		1		1		1		1		1				1	1		1	1		1		1	1	13
(United States) Shane Van Boening			1		1		1		1		1		1	1	1			1			1		1			11
