= 2013 WPA World Nine-ball Championship =

WPA World 9-Ball Championship 2013
Tournament information
- Sport: 9-ball
- Location: Qatar Billiards and Snooker Federation; Doha, Qatar
- Dates: September 2, 2013–September 13, 2013
- Tournament format: Double elimination / Single elimination
- Host: WPA World Nine-ball Championship
- Participants: 128

Final positions
- Champion: (Germany) Thorsten Hohmann
- Runner-up: (Philippines) Antonio Gabica

The 2013 WPA World Nine-ball Championship was the 22nd event in the annual WPA World Nine-ball Championship. The event took place from September 2 to 13, 2013 in Doha, Qatar.

Germany's Thorsten Hohmann became world champion by a 13–6 victory over Philippine Antonio Gabica, in the final. This was Hohmann's second 9-ball World championship, having also won the 2003 WPA World Nine-ball Championship. Hohmann defeated defending champion Darren Appleton in an early stage of the event.

== Format ==
The 128 participating players were divided into 16 groups, in which they competed in a double elimination tournament against each other. The remaining 64 players in each group qualified for the final round played in the knockout system.

=== Prize money ===
The event's prize money stayed similar to that of the previous years, with winner Thorsten Hohmann winning $36,000.

| Position | Prize |
|---|---|
| First Place (champion) | $36,000 |
| Second Place (runner-up) | $18,000 |
| Third Place (semi-finalist | $10,000 |
| Fifth place (quarter finalist) | $6,000 |
| Ninth place (loser in round of 16) | $4,000 |
| Seventeenth place (loser in round of 32) | $2,500 |
| Thirty Third (loser in round of 64) | $2,000 |
| Sixty Fifth (loser in preliminaries) | $500 |

== Results ==
=== Preliminary round ===
The following 32 players won once in the preliminary round and lost twice, which means early retirement and places 65 to 96:

- (United Arab Emirates) Hanni Al Howri
- (Chinese Taipei) Kuo Po-cheng
- (Canada) Jason Klatt
- (Japan) Hayato Hijikata
- (China) Liu Haitao
- (Japan) Yukio Akakariyama
- (Lithuania) Henrikas Strolis
- (Spain) Marc Vidal
- (Qatar) Waleed Majid
- (Kuwait) Bader al-Awadi
- (United States) Hunter Lombardo
- (Poland) Mateusz Śniegocki
- (South Korea) Jeong Young-hwa
- (England) So Shaw
- (Poland) Radosław Babica
- (Iran) Maghsoud Ali
- (Poland) Tomasz Kapłan
- (Japan) Satoshi Kawabata
- (United States) Robb Saez
- (Chinese Taipei) Fu Che-wei
- (Qatar) Bashar Hussain
- (United Arab Emirates) Salaheideen Alrimawi
- (Qatar) Mhana Al Obaidly
- (China) Li Hewen
- (Singapore) Aloysius Yapp
- (Canada) Mario Morra
- (Philippines) Francisco Bustamante
- (Saudi Arabia) Abdullah Alyousef
- (China) Han Haoxiang
- (South Africa) Nico Erasmus
- (Finland) Petri Makkonen

The following 32 players lost twice in the preliminary round, which means early retirement and places 97–128.

- (Bangladesh) Sayeem Hossain
- (United States) Shaun Wilkie
- (Egypt) K. A. Faray
- Chi Ho Kwok
- (Czech Republic) Roman Hybler
- (Kuwait) Jasem al-Hasawi
- (Japan) Ryouji Hori
- (Qatar) Abdulatif Fawal
- (Egypt) Zayed Mohamed
- (Saudi Arabia) Meshari Albuqayli
- (Italy) Giorgio Margola
- (Qatar) Saleh Ameen
- (South Africa) Sibongiseni Gumede
- (Qatar) Khamis al-Obaidly
- (Jordan) Naif Abdulafou
- (Germany) Nicolas Ottermann
- (United Arab Emirates) Mohammad Abdullah
- (New Zealand) Nick Pera
- Ricky Puro
- (Iran) Mehdi Rasheki
- (Qatar) Ali al-Obaidly
- (Qatar) Mohd al-Buainan
- (Italy) Bruno Muratore
- (India) Syed Habib
- (Austria) Albin Ouschan
- (Peru) Christopher Tevez
- (Saudi Arabia) Badr Alhamdan
- (Jordan) Nour al-Jarrah
- (Qatar) Muhammed Al Bin Ali
- (Bangladesh) Fahim Sinha
- (Iran) Gharegozlou

=== Knockout round ===
Round of 64
(Chinese Taipei) Chang Jung-lin | 6
(Germany) Oliver Ortmann | 11
(Philippines) Antonio Gabica | 11
(Vietnam) Anh Tuan Nguyen | 8
(Chinese Taipei) Ko Pin-yi | 11
(South Korea) Ryu Seung-woo | 2
(Finland) Mika Immonen | 11
(Canada) Alex Pagulayan | 6
(China) Wu Jia-qing | 11
(Chinese Taipei) Chao Fong-pang | 8
(Netherlands) Nick van den Berg | 11
(Philippines) Efren Reyes | 5
(Singapore) Toh Lian Han | 11
Bu Hong Kong | 5
(Chinese Taipei) Hsu Kai-lun | 11
(England) Phil Burford | 6
(Philippines) Marlon Villamor | 10
(England) Karl Boyes | 11
(Russia) Konstantin Stepanov | 6
(Netherlands) Huidji See | 11
(Philippines) Israel Rota | 11
(Philippines) Mark Antony | 8
(Chinese Taipei) Lo Li-wen | 11
(Philippines) Raymund Faraon | 4
(Portugal) Manuel Gama | 7
(Philippines) Lee Vann Corteza | 11
(England) Daryl Peach | 11
(United States) Corey Deuel | 10
(Austria) Mario He | 11
(England) Mark Gray | 7
(China) Wang Can | 8
(Greece) Nikos Ekonomopoulos | 11
(Japan) Naoyuki Ōi | 11
(Germany) Dominic Jentsch | 5
(Hungary) Vilmos Földes | 11
(Vietnam) Khanh Hoang Nguyen | 6
(Netherlands) Niels Feijen | 9
(Philippines) Jeff De Luna | 11
(Russia) Ruslan Chinakhov | 7
(Indonesia) Muhammad Zulfikiri | 11
(England) Darren Appleton | 11
(Netherlands) Ivo Aarts | 3
(Japan) Tōru Kuribayashi | 10
(Germany) Thorsten Hohmann | 11
(Albania) Nick Malai | 9
(Canada) John Morra | 11
(Philippines) Dennis Orcollo | 11
(Chinese Taipei) Cheng Yu-hsuan | 10
(Chinese Taipei) Chang Yu-lung | 7
(England) Chris Melling | 11
(Chile) Enrique Rojas | 8
(Philippines) Ramil Gallego | 11
(Spain) David Alcaide | 11
(England) Imran Majid | 8
(United Arab Emirates) Jalal Yousef | 11
(Greece) Alexander Kazakis | 6
(Germany) Ralf Souquet | 5
(Philippines) Carlo Biado | 11
(United States) Shane Van Boening | 11
(Lebanon) Mohamad Ali Berjaoui | 2
(Italy) Fabio Petroni | 11
(Switzerland) Dimitri Jungo | 6
(Kuwait) Omar Al-Shaheen | 5
(Philippines) Marlon Manalo | 11

Round of 32
(Germany) Oliver Ortmann | 8
(Philippines) Antonio Gabica | 11
(Chinese Taipei) Ko Pin-yi | 11
(Finland) Mika Immonen | 8
(China) Wu Jia-qing | 10
(Netherlands) Nick van den Berg | 11
(Singapore) Toh Lian Han | 9
(Chinese Taipei) Hsu Kai-lun | 11
(England) Karl Boyes | 11
(Netherlands) Huidji See | 8
(Philippines) Israel Rota | 2
(Chinese Taipei) Lo Li-wen | 11
(Philippines) Lee Vann Corteza | 11
(England) Daryl Peach | 4
(Austria) Mario He | 6
(Greece) Nikos Ekonomopoulos | 11
(Japan) Naoyuki Ōi | 7
(Hungary) Vilmos Földes | 11
(Philippines) Jeff De Luna | 11
(Indonesia) Muhammad Zulfikiri | 5
(England) Darren Appleton | 5
(Germany) Thorsten Hohmann | 11
(Canada) John Morra | 6
(Philippines) Dennis Orcollo | 11
(England) Chris Melling | 11
(Philippines) Ramil Gallego | 7
(Spain) David Alcaide | 11
(United Arab Emirates) Jalal Yousef | 7
(Philippines) Carlo Biado | 11
(United States) Shane Van Boening | 10
(Italy) Fabio Petroni | 11
(Philippines) Marlon Manalo | 7

Round of 16
(Philippines) Antonio Gabica | 11
(Chinese Taipei) Ko Pin-yi | 9
(Netherlands) Nick van den Berg | 11
(Chinese Taipei) Hsu Kai-lun | 7
(England) Karl Boyes | 11
(Chinese Taipei) Lo Li-wen | 10
(Philippines) Lee Vann Corteza | 9
(Greece) Nikos Ekonomopoulos | 11
(Hungary) Vilmos Földes | 8
(Philippines) Jeff De Luna | 11
(Germany) Thorsten Hohmann | 11
(Philippines) Dennis Orcollo | 8
(England) Chris Melling | 11
(Spain) David Alcaide | 8
(Philippines) Carlo Biado | 11
(Italy) Fabio Petroni | 10

Quarter final
(Philippines) Antonio Gabica | 11
(Netherlands) Nick van den Berg | 10
(England) Karl Boyes | 11
(Greece) Nikos Ekonomopoulos | 8
(Philippines) Jeff De Luna | 7
(Germany) Thorsten Hohmann | 11
(England) Chris Melling | 3
(Philippines) Carlo Biado | 11

Semifinal
(Philippines) Antonio Gabica | 11
(England) Karl Boyes | 6
(Germany) Thorsten Hohmann | 11
(Philippines) Carlo Biado | 4

Final
(Philippines) Antonio Gabica | 6
(Germany) Thorsten Hohmann | 13
