= 2014 WPA World Nine-ball Championship =

WPA World 9-Ball Championship 2014
Tournament information
- Sport: 9-ball
- Location: al-Arabi Sports Club, Doha, Qatar
- Dates: June 16, 2014–June 27, 2014
- Tournament format: Double elimination / Single elimination
- Host: WPA World Nine-ball Championship
- Participants: 128

Final positions
- Champion: (Netherlands) Niels Feijen
- Runner-up: (Austria) Albin Ouschan

The 2014 WPA World Nine-ball Championship was the 23rd edition of the 9-Ball pool World Championships. It took place from June 16 to 27, 2014 in the al-Attiya Sports Arena of the Al-Arabi Sports Club in Doha. The Qatari capital was the fifth time in a row the venue for the 9-Ball Championships.

Dutch Niels Feijen defeated Austria's Albin Ouschan in the final, winning 13–10. Defending champion Thorsten Hohmann would lose in the round of 64, to Marco Teutscher.

== Tournament format ==
The tournament was attended by 128 players. In the preliminary round was played in the double elimination tournament system. Winners of these games would qualify for the final round, which is played in the knockout system.

== Brackets ==
=== Preliminary Round ===
The preliminary round was played between the 21–24 June 2014.

The following players won one game in the double-elimination round, and were classified as finishing between 65 and 96.

- IND Sumit Talwar
- CAN Erik Hjorleifson
- ENG Scott Cooney
- UAE Jalal Yousef
- KSA Abdul Rahman al-Ammar
- ROU Babken Melkonyan
- CRO Michel Bartol
- TPE Kuo Po-cheng
- CHN Liu Haitao
- USA Hunter Lombardo
- VEN Frailin Guanipa
- KUW Abdullah al-Yusef
- NLD Ivo Aarts
- TPE Ko Ping-chung
- SWE Tom Storm
- NZL Glen Coutts
- KUW Maj al-Azmi
- PHI Efren Reyes
- LIB Mazen Berjaoui
- PHI Elvis Calasang
- USA Brandon Shuff
- IRN Mohammadali Pordel
- VIE Nguyen Anh Tuan
- QAT Ali Obaidly
- FIN Petri Makkonen
- USA Corey Deuel
- POL Tomasz Kapłan
- PHI Israel Rota
- KUW Omar Al-Shaheen
- CRO Ivica Putnik
- UKR Artem Koshovyi
- UAE Omran Salem

The following players lost twice and won no matches in the double-elimination round, and were classified 97–128.

- UAE Mohammed al-Hosani
- QAT Mohd Al Bin Ali
- CAN John Morra
- IRQ Hasan Hwaida Idan
- ERI Hamzaa Saeed Ali
- BRU Ahmed Taufiq
- QAT Mishel Turkey
- BAN Fahim Sinha
- JPN Yukio Akakariyama
- RSA Detlef Grzella
- EGY Mohamed Hamouda
- HKG Eric Lee
- POL Karol Skowerski
- UAE Abdulla Mohammad
- HUN Vilmos Földes
- JOR Nour Wasfi al-Jarrah
- BAN Sayeem Hossain
- EST Denis Grabe
- NLD Stefan Sprangers
- CHI Alejandro Carvajal
- EGY Mohamed Elassal
- AUT Jürgen Jenisy
- LIB Mohammad Ali Berjaou
- ECU Christian Aguirre
- KSA Bader al-Hamdan
- SIN Koh Seng Ann Aaron
- RSA J-Ram Alabanzas
- ENG Imran Majid
- ENG So Shaw
- HKG Kwok Chi Ho
- QAT Bashar Hussain
- CAN Mario Morra

=== Final Round ===
The knockout round was played between the 25–27 June 2014.

Round of 64; 25. June 2014
CHN Wang Can	11
PHI Warren Kiamco	9
PHI Raymund Faraon	11
TPE Liu Cheng-chieh	5
PHI Elmer Haya	11
PHI Francisco Felicilda	4
JPN Hayato Hijikata	11
JPN Masaaki Tanaka	8
QAT Waleed Majid	11
PHI Lee Vann Corteza	6
ENG Darren Appleton	11
ENG Daryl Peach	3
RUS Konstantin Stepanov	11
SWE Andreas Gerwen	8
PHI Johann Chua	11
ITA Daniele Corrieri	4
AUT Mario He	11
PHI Alex Pagulayan	9
SCO Jayson Shaw	9
KOR Jeong Young-hwa	11
POL Radosław Babica	11
POR Manuel Gama	3
NED Niels Feijen	11
UAE Salaheldeen Al Rimawi	4
PHI Carlo Biado	11
POL Mieszko Fortuński	6
PHI Jeff De Luna	6
CAN Jason Klatt	11
PHI Dennis Orcollo	8
JPN Naoyuki Ōi	11
TPE Ko Pin-yi	11
IND Sundeep Gulati	3
TPE Fu Che-wei	6
TPE Hsu Kai-lun	11
CHN Wu Jia-qing	11
JPN Lo Li-wen	4
NED Huidji See	5
FRA Stephan Cohen	11
TPE Cheng Yu-hsuan	9
TPE Chang Yu-Lung	11
USA Shane Van Boening	11
TPE Chang Jung-lin	9
CHN Dang Jinhu	11
ENG Karl Boyes	6
JPN Tōru Kuribayashi	11
GRE Alexander Kazakis	9
GRE Nikos Ekonomopoulos	11
ITA Fabio Petroni	5
PHI Antonio Gabica	11
IRN Mehdi Rasekhi	7
ITA Bruno Muratore	7
KOR Ryu Seung-woo	11
FIN Mika Immonen	7
CZE Roman Hybler	11
DEU Oliver Ortmann	5
AUT Albin Ouschan	11
CHN Li Hewen	11
CHE Dimitri Jungo	7
DEU Thorsten Hohmann	9
NED Marco Teutscher	11
NED Nick van den Berg	11
SIN Aloysius Yapp	8
DEU Ralf Souquet	10
PHI Ramil Gallego	11

Round of 32; 26. June 2014
CHN Wang Can	7
PHI Raymund Faraon	11
PHI Elmer Haya	11
JPN Hayato Hijikata	8
QAT Waleed Majid	11
ENG Darren Appleton	9
RUS Konstantin Stepanov	3
PHI Johann Chua	11
AUT Mario He	11
KOR Jeong Young-hwa	10
POL Radosław Babica	6
NED Niels Feijen	11
PHI Carlo Biado	11
CAN Jason Klatt	5
JPN Naoyuki Ōi	10
TPE Ko Pin-yi	11
TPE Hsu Kai-lun	10
CHN Wu Jia-qing	11
FRA Stephan Cohen	6
TPE Chang Yu-Lung	11
USA Shane Van Boening	11
CHN Dang Jinhu	4
JPN Tōru Kuribayashi	11
GRE Nikos Ekonomopoulos	9
PHI Antonio Gabica	11
KOR Ryu Seung-woo	6
CZE Roman Hybler	9
AUT Albin Ouschan	11
CHN Li Hewen	11
NED Marco Teutscher	8
NED Nick van den Berg	11
PHI Ramil Gallego	8

Round of 16; 26. June 2014
PHI Raymund Faraon	8
PHI Elmer Haya	11
QAT Waleed Majid	8
PHI Johann Chua	11
AUT Mario He	6
NED Niels Feijen	11
PHI Carlo Biado	11
TPE Ko Pin-yi	7
CHN Wu Jia-qing	10
TPE Chang Yu-Lung	11
USA Shane Van Boening	11
JPN Tōru Kuribayashi	5
PHI Antonio Gabica	9
AUT Albin Ouschan	11
CHN Li Hewen	11
NED Nick van den Berg	7

QuarterFinal; 26. June 2014
PHI Elmer Haya	11
PHI Johann Chua	8
NED Niels Feijen	11
PHI Carlo Biado	7
TPE Chang Yu-Lung	11
USA Shane Van Boening	8
AUT Albin Ouschan	11
CHN Li Hewen	8

SemiFinal; 27. June 2014
PHI Elmer Haya	7
NED Niels Feijen	11
TPE Chang Yu-Lung	7
AUT Albin Ouschan	11

Final; 27. June 2014
NED Niels Feijen	13
AUT Albin Ouschan	10
