= 2011 WPA World Nine-ball Championship =

Professional pool competition, held 2011

- Logo for the event

Tournament information
- Sport: Nine-ball
- Location: Al Sadd Sports Club; Doha, Qatar
- Dates: June 21, 2011–July 1, 2011
- Tournament format(s): Double elimination, single elimination
- Host: WPA World Nine-ball Championship
- Participants: 128

Final positions
- Champion: (Japan) Yukio Akakariyama
- Runner-up: (Philippines) Ronato Alcano

The 2011 WPA World Nine-ball Championship was a professional nine-ball pool tournament held from June 25 to July 1, 2011, at the Al Sadd Sports Club in Doha, Qatar. A series of qualifying tournaments were held from June 21 to 23. It was the 2011 edition of the WPA World Nine-ball Championship, which was first held in 1990. The event was organized by the World Pool-Billiard Association (WPA).

The defending champion was Filipino Francisco Bustamante, who defeated Kuo Po-cheng 13–7 in the final of the 2010 WPA World Nine-ball Championship. Bustamante lost to Dennis Orcollo in the last 32. Japanese player Yukio Akakariyama defeated Ronato Alcano of the Philippines 13–11 in the final to become the first Japanese world pool champion since 1998, when Takahashi Kunihiko defeated Johnny Archer. The event had a prize fund of $250,000, with the winner receiving $30,000.

== Overview ==
The 2011 WPA World Nine-ball Championship was a professional nine-ball pool championship, organized and promoted by the World Pool-Billiard Association and Matchroom Sport. It was held at the headquarters of the Qatari Billiard and Snooker Federation, in the Al Sadd Sports Club in Doha, Qatar. The championships were held for 128 competitors between June 25 and July 1, 2011. It had 116 invited players, and a series of three qualifying events from June 21 to 23 produced 12 more players.

Matches were played with alternating breaks as races-to-nine racks. The winner of the lag broke for the first rack and every odd-numbered rack thereafter, including the final rack if required. The 128 participants were split into 16 groups of eight, competing in a double-elimination format. When 64 players remained, the event changed to a single-elimination knockout; matches were race-to-11 racks except for the final, which was a race-to-13. The defending champion was Francisco Bustamante, who won the 2010 final against Kuo Po-cheng 13–7.

=== Prize fund ===
The event had a prize fund of $250,000. The winner received $36,000, the same as the 2010 championship. The prize money was divided as follows:

- Winner: $36,000
- Runner-up: $18,000
- Semi-finalist: $10,000
- Quarter-finalist: $6,000
- Last 16: $4,000
- Last 32: $2,500
- Last 64: $2,000
- Group stage: $500
- Total: $250,000

== Summary ==
=== Double-elimination round ===
The double-elimination stage, consisting of four rounds, took place on June 21–25. A first-round match between Efren Reyes and Mark Gray went to a deciding rack. Gray led 6–2 at the start of the match, but Reyes tied the score at 7–7. Reyes later reached the hill ahead at 8–7, but lost position on the next rack to allow Gray to tie the match at hill-hill. Reyes sank a ball on the break and cleared the table to win the match, 9–8. Defending champion Bustamante led fellow Filipino player Caneda Villamor, 5–2. Villamor, a pool instructor in Saudi Arabia, cut Bustamante's lead to 6–5 when the match turned into a battle of safety shots. Bustamante made a combination shot between the six-and 9-balls in rack 16 to win, 9–7. The 2010 runner-up, Kuo Po-cheng, won his first-round match 9–7.

The second day featured first- and second-round matches. The Filipino world number-two Ronato Alcano and world number-three Antonio Lining defeated Hamzah al-Saeed 9–5 and Liu Cheng-Cheih 9–4, respectively, in the first round. The 1995 champion, Oliver Ortmann, lost his opening match 6–9 to Japanese player Tohru Kuribayashi. Qualifier Mohammad al-Hazmi defeated world number-24 Nguyen Phuc Long, 9–6; he would play Daryl Peach, who defeated Keng Kwang Chan 9–5. Qatar's number-one Mohanna Obaidly lost his first round matches, but defeated Andrew Kong of Hong Kong in the loser's second round. Mark Gray trailed 2–7, but won seven racks in-a-row to win 9–7. Two matches went to a deciding rack; Radosław Babica and Yukio Akakariyama defeated Raymund Faron and Mohammed Al Bin Ali 9–8, respectively.

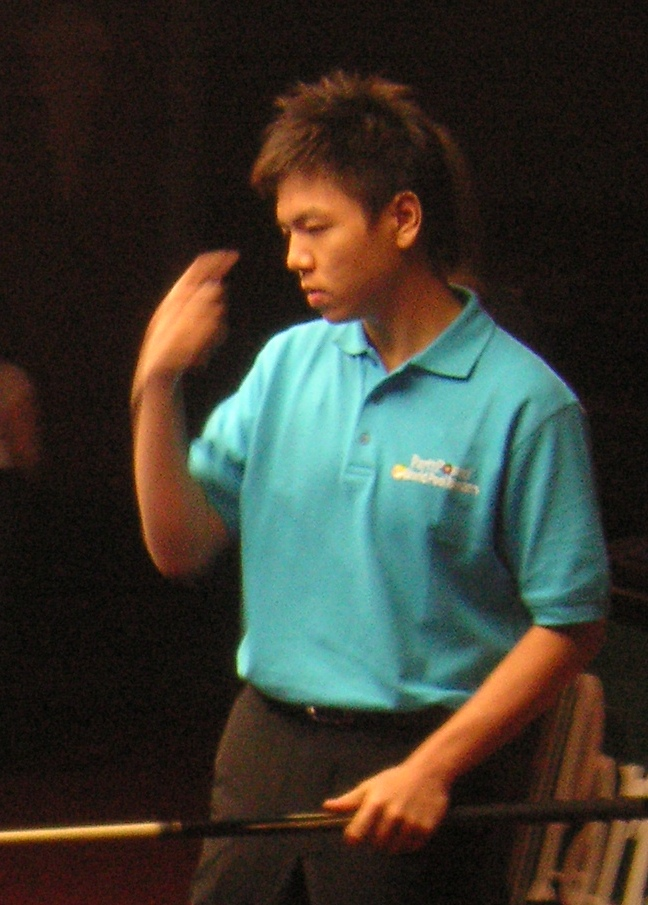
The 2005 winner, Wu Jia-qing (shown in 2007), lost twice in the double-elimination round.

The third day was devoted to second-round matches. Winners in the winners' bracket advanced to the round of 64, and losers'-bracket winners played the winners'-bracket losers the following day. All Filipino players in the winners' bracket won their matches to advance to the round of 64; WPA world number-one Dennis Orcollo, Reyes, Bustamante, Oliver Medenilla, Jeffery de Luna, Alan Cuartero, Ronato Alcano and Antonio Lining all won their matches and qualified for the knockout round. The 2006 WPA World Nine-ball Championship winner Alcano had to win a deciding rack to defeat Radosław Babica of Poland, and Cuartero (an overseas Filipino worker in Kuwait) defeated Marcus Chamat of Sweden. Shane Van Boening, one of only two Americans in the tournament, defeated 2005 champion Wu Jia-qing. Wu led 2–0, then went on the hill at 8–6. Van Boening evened the match, and held on to win in the final rack.

The fourth day was devoted to second-round matches in the losers' bracket, with winners progressing and losers eliminated. All home Qatari players were eliminated from contention in the group stage; Mohanna Obaidly was beaten by Konstantin Stepanov 3–9, Taher Hussain lost to Tōru Kuribayashi 1–9, Waleed Majid was defeated by Hunter Lombardo 8–9, and Fawal Abdulatif lost to Naoyuki Ōi 9–6. The match between Antonio Gabica and Fu Jianbo finished 9–8. The Qatar-based Gabica had a 6–1 lead, but the Chinese won the next four racks. Gabica was first on the hill, but Fu won the next three racks. Gabica won the deciding rack to advance to the knockout stage. Ko Ping-chung and Kwang Yong exchanged leads in their match until Yong pulled ahead, 7–4. Ko tied the match 7–7, and won next two racks to qualify for the next round. Former two-time world champion Wu Jia-qing was beaten by Mariusz Skoneczny. The match was level at 8–8; but Wu missed the 8-ball and allowed Skoneczny to pot the last two balls for a 9–8 win.

=== Knockout rounds ===
==== Early rounds (last 64 to last 16) ====
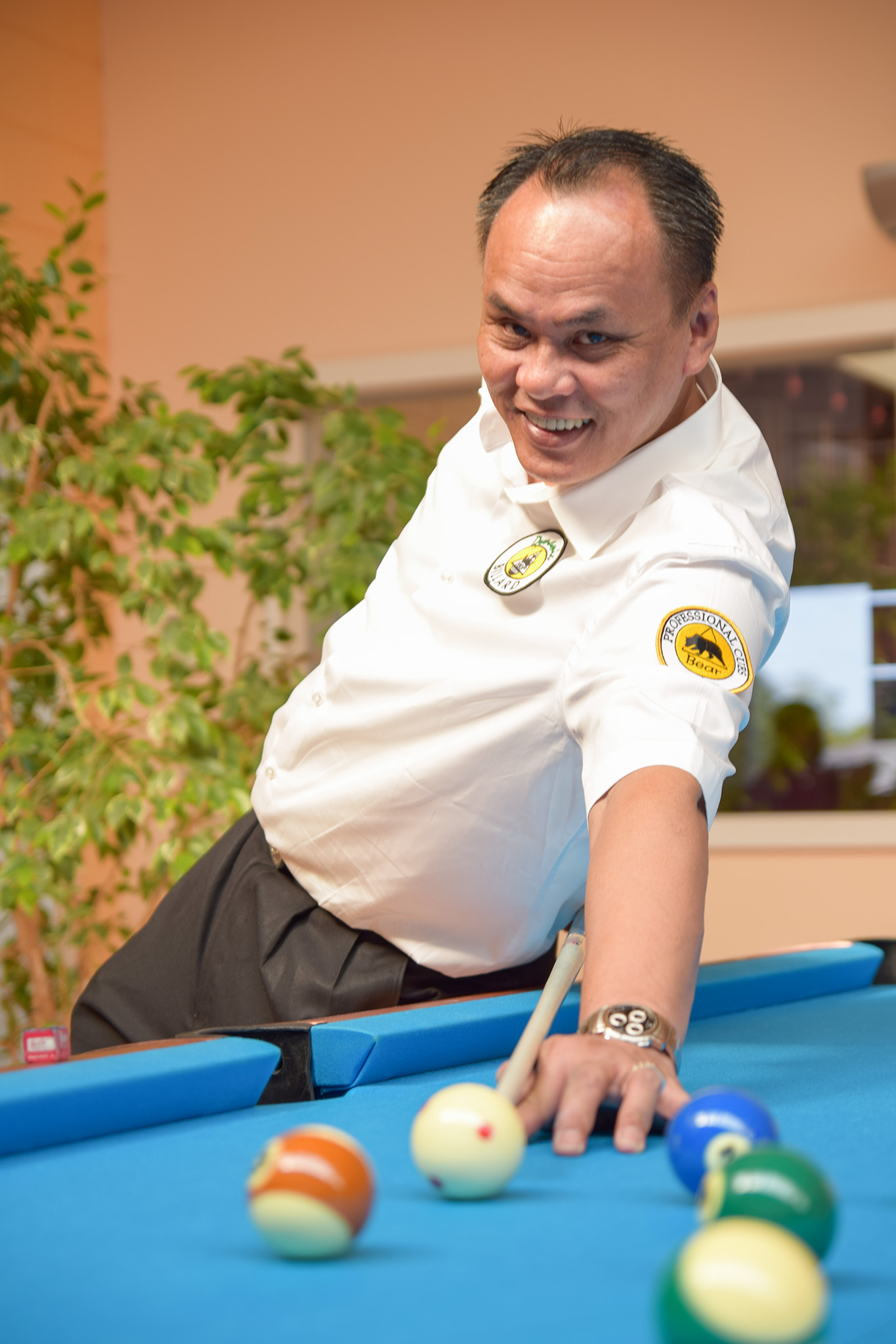
Defending champion Francisco Bustamante lost in the last 16 to Dennis Orcollo.

The tournament changed to single-elimination from June 29 to July 1. The round of 64 was played on June 29, when Efren Reyes was defeated by fellow Filipino Villamor 11–5. Antonio Gabica led Mika Immonen 4–1 and 10–6 when he scratched in rack 17, allowing Immonen to win the next four racks and go hill-hill. The deciding rack was a safety battle until Gabica pocketed the 1-ball and ran the rack to win, 11–10. Kuo Po-cheng led Mark Gray 10–6 before Gray won five racks in a row to win, 11–10. Gray drew fellow Brit Chris Melling, who beat Korean Hwang Yong. Francisco Bustamante defeated Sascha-Andrej Tege, 11–4.

In the last 32, played on June 30, Francisco Bustamante was leading 9–4 against Riyan Setiawan when he was reportedly distracted by a press photographer. Setiawan won three of the next four to trail 10–7, but won the next three to take the match to a decider. Bustamante had the break before a safety battle ensued. Riyan scratched, and Bustamante ran out to advance to the last 16. In an all-Filipino match, Carlo Biado led Lee Vann Corteza 8–5; Corteza won the next four frames, however, to lead 9–8. In rack 18, Corteza missed a shot at the nine-ball and Biado won the remaining racks to win 11–9.

In the last 16 on June 30, Shane Van Boening (the only American left in the field) led 6–3 against England's Darren Appleton. Appleton tied the match at 6–6, then took the lead 7–6. They exchanged leads when Appleton reached the hill first, but van Boening tied when he made a jump shot on the 5-ball in rack 20. In the deciding rack, van Boening made a safety in which Appleton studied for ten minutes. Appleton missed, but there was no clear shot as Van Boening studied the ball for several minutes before making the shot and running out for the win. The 2007 champion, Daryl Peach, defeated Ko Pin-yi after trailing 9–7 and winning four racks in a row. Defending champion Francisco Bustamante, who had only five minutes between matches, lost 11–6 to Dennis Orcollo. In other matches, Yukio Akakariyama eliminated Carlo Biado and Tōru Kuribayashi defeated Antonio Lining.

==== Later rounds (quarter-finals to final) ====
The quarter-finals to the final were played on July 1, the last day of competition. In the quarter-finals, Dennis Orcollo led 5–0 against Daryl Peach early in the match before winning 11–2. Mark Gray played Shane van Boening and held a 4–0 lead before van Boening won five racks in a row to lead, 5–4. Gray then won the next four racks and led, 10–6. Van Boening won the next three frames, but missed a shot using the bridge in rack 20. They took their time studying the nine-ball shot, but van Boening made an errant safety which allowed Gray to capitalize and win the match. Tōru Kuribayashi trailed Ronato Alcano 7–3, but won five of the next six to level the match at 8–8 (which later became 10–10). Kuribayashi broke for the game, but they were locked in a safety battle. After a fluke on the three-ball, Alcano ran the rack to win 11–10.

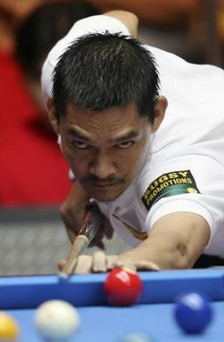
The 2006 champion Ronato Alcano lost in the final.

Yukio Akakariyama led Vinacio Tanio throughout the match until Tanio tied it 8–8, when Akakariyama lost the next rack to trail 9–8 and 10–9; the match went to a decider after a break and run. Tanio broke in rack 21, but ran out of position on the eight-ball. He sank the ball, but faced another difficult shot on the nine-ball. Tanio missed, and Akakariyama faced a table-length shot on the nine-ball; he took over ten minutes to study the shot before potting it to win, 11–10.

The first semi-final saw Orcullo face Alcano. Alcano won the first two racks and remained at least two racks ahead throughout, leading 8–4 and 10–6. Orcullo won three racks in a row before Alcano won rack 20 to win, 11–9. After the match, Alcano said that his game had improved since he no longer having a manager; instead, he worked with Filipino boxer Manny Pacquiao: "[A]ll I need is just a little bit of Manny's good fortune and I can win the World Championship. I just have to win one more match." The second semi-final went to a deciding rack between Yukio Akagariyama and Mark Gray. Yukio led 6–2 and 8–3 before Gray won five racks in a row to level the match at 8–8. Gray missed a bank shot on the nine-ball in rack 17, allowing Yukio to win that rack and the next to lead 10–8. Gray won the next two racks, and had the break in rack 21. The cue ball scratched on his break, allowing Yukio to clear the table and win 11–10.

The final was played at 7 p.m. local time (GMT+3) as race-to-13 racks, with breaks alternating between Yukio and Alcano. Alcano won the lag and the racks were won on break until rack nine, when Yukio took a 5–4 lead. He won the next frame, after a failed jump shot by Alcano. Breaking to have a three-rack lead, Yukio went in-off when potting the nine-ball and allowed Alcano to win the rack. Yukio won the next two to take a 9–6 lead, but Alcano won three in a row to tie the match 9–9. In rack 19, Alcano missed an eight-ball shot which traveled the length of the table; Yukio won the next two to lead, 11–9. Alcano tied the match 11–11 with safety play in the next two racks. Breaking in rack 23, Alcano missed a shot on the two-ball into the middle pocket and Yukio ran the rest of the rack. Yukio broke in rack 24, and ran the balls in order to win 13–11.

== Knockout stage ==
The knockout draw for the last 64 stages follows; players in bold are match winners.

=== Upper half ===
==== Section 1 ====
**Round of 64** (Race to 11)
(Germany) **Ralf Souquet**	**11**
(Belgium) Serge Das	5
(Poland) Radosław Babica	7
(Poland) **Mateusz Śniegocki**	**11**
(Germany) Thorsten Hohmann	7
(Japan) **Lo Li-wen**	**11**
(Netherlands) Nick van den Berg	7
(Philippines) **Vicenancio Tanio**	**11**

**Round of 32** (Race to 11)
(Germany) **Ralf Souquet**	**11**
(Poland) Mateusz Śniegocki	2
(Japan) Lo Li-wen	6
(Philippines) **Vicenancio Tanio**	11

**Round of 16** (Race to 11)
(Germany) Ralf Souquet	9
(Philippines) **Vicenancio Tanio**	**11**

==== Section 2 ====
**Round of 64** (Race to 11)
(Croatia) **Carlo Dalmatin**	**11**
(Chinese Taipei) Hsu Kai Lun	7
(Japan) **Yukio Akakariyama**	**11**
(Iran) Soheil Vahedi	7
(Philippines) Oliver Medenilla	5
(Philippines) **Lee Vann Corteza**	**11**
(Philippines) **Carlo Biado**	**11**
(Iran) Takhti Zarekani	6

**Round of 32** (Race to 11)
(Croatia) Carlo Dalmatin	8
(Japan) **Yukio Akakariyama**	**11**
(Philippines) Lee Vann Corteza	10
(Philippines) **Carlo Biado**	**11**

**Round of 16** (Race to 11)
(Japan) **Yukio Akakariyama**	**11**
(Philippines) Carlo Biado	9

==== Section 3 ====
**Round of 64** (Race to 11)
(Finland) Mika Immonen	10
(Philippines) **Antonio Gabica**	**11**
(England) Imran Majid	4
(Japan) **Naoyuki Ōi**	**11**
(England) **Chris Melling**	**11**
(South Korea) Hwang Yong	2
(Chinese Taipei) Kuo Po-cheng	10
(England) **Mark Gray**	**11**

**Round of 32** (Race to 11)
(Philippines) **Antonio Gabica**	**11**
(Japan) Naoyuki Ōi	6
(England) Chris Melling	10
(England) **Mark Gray**	**11**

**Round of 16** (Race to 11)
(Philippines) Antonio Gabica	5
(England) **Mark Gray**	**11**

==== Section 4 ====
**Round of 64** (Race to 11)
(England) **Darren Appleton**	**11**
(China) Dang Jinhu	6
(Philippines) **Alan Cuartero**	**11**
(Brunei) Ahmad Taufiq Murni	9
(United States) **Shane Van Boening**	**11**
(Russia) Konstantin Stepanov	8
(Chinese Taipei) **Chang Jung-lin**	**11**
(Philippines) Joven Alba	5

**Round of 32** (Race to 11)
(England) **Darren Appleton**	**11**
(Philippines) Alan Cuartero	4
(United States) **Shane Van Boening**	**11**
(Chinese Taipei) Chang Jung-lin	5

**Round of 16** (Race to 11)
(England) Darren Appleton	10
(United States) **Shane Van Boening**	**11**

=== Lower half ===
==== Section 5 ====
**Round of 64** (Race to 11)
(Canada) Chris Orme	7
(Philippines) **Ronato Alcano**	**11**
(India) **Raj Hundal**	**11**
(Japan) Tomoo Takano	10
(Chinese Taipei) **Chang Yu-lung**	**11**
(Philippines) Israel Rota	9
(Netherlands) Niels Feijen	10
(England) **Scott Higgins**	**11**

**Round of 32** (Race to 11)
(Philippines) **Ronato Alcano**	**11**
(India) Raj Hundal	9
(Chinese Taipei) **Chang Yu-lung**	**11**
(England) Scott Higgins	4

**Round of 16** (Race to 11)
(Philippines) **Ronato Alcano**	**11**
(Chinese Taipei) Chang Yu-lung	5

==== Section 6 ====
**Round of 64** (Race to 11)
(Philippines) **Antonio Lining**	**11**
(Germany) Oliver Ortmann	5
(Czech Republic) **Roman Hybler**	**11**
(China) Liu Haitao	7
(Austria) Mario He	8
(United States) **Hunter Lombardo**	**11**
(Netherlands) Huidji See	8
(Japan) **Tōru Kuribayashi**	**11**

**Round of 32** (Race to 11)
(Philippines) **Antonio Lining**	**11**
(Czech Republic) Roman Hybler	5
(United States) Hunter Lombardo	4
(Japan) **Tōru Kuribayashi**	**11**

**Round of 16** (Race to 11)
(Philippines) Antonio Lining	9
(Japan) **Tōru Kuribayashi**	**11**

==== Section 7 ====
**Round of 64** (Race to 11)
(Philippines) **Dennis Orcollo**	**11**
(Indonesia) Muhammad Zulfikri	9
(Philippines) Efren Reyes	5
(Philippines) **Caneda Villamor**	**11**
(Philippines) **Francisco Bustamante**	**11**
(Germany) Sascha-Andrej Tege	4
(Spain) Carlos Cabello	8
(Indonesia) **Riyan Setiawan**	**11**

**Round of 32** (Race to 11)
(Philippines) **Dennis Orcollo**	**11**
(Philippines) Caneda Villamor	6
(Philippines) **Francisco Bustamante**	**11**
(Indonesia) Riyan Setiawan	10

**Round of 16** (Race to 11)
(Philippines) **Dennis Orcollo**	**11**
(Philippines) Francisco Bustamante	7

==== Section 8 ====
**Round of 64** (Race to 11)
(Philippines) Jeff de Luna	9
(Chinese Taipei) **Fu Che-wei**	**11**
(England) **Daryl Peach**	**11**
(Philippines) Roberto Gomez	4
(France) **Stephan Cohen**	**11**
(Philippines) Raymund Faron	9
(England) Karl Boyes	8
(Chinese Taipei) **Ko Pin-yi**	**11**

**Round of 32** (Race to 11)
(Chinese Taipei) Fu Che-wei	1
(England) **Daryl Peach**	**11**
(France) Stephan Cohen	3
(Chinese Taipei) **Ko Pin-yi**	**11**

**Round of 16** (Race to 11)
(England) **Daryl Peach**	**11**
(Chinese Taipei) Ko Pin-yi	9

=== Quarterfinals onward ===
**Quarterfinals** (Race to 11)
(Philippines) Vicenancio Tanio	10
(Japan) **Yukio Akakariyama**	**11**
(England) **Mark Gray**	**11**
(United States) Shane Van Boening	9
(Philippines) **Ronato Alcano**	**11**
(Japan) Tōru Kuribayashi	10
(Philippines) **Dennis Orcollo**	**11**
(England) Daryl Peach	4

**Semifinals** (Race to 11)
(Japan) **Yukio Akakariyama**	**11**
(England) Mark Gray	10
(Philippines) **Ronato Alcano**	**11**
(Philippines) Dennis Orcollo	9

**Final** (Race to 13)
(Japan) **Yukio Akakariyama**	**13**
(Philippines) Ronato Alcano	11

=== Final ===
Player	Lag	Rack																								Racks won
Player	Lag	1	2	3	4	5	6	7	8	9	10	11	12	13	14	15	16	17	18	19	20	21	22	23	24	Racks won
(Philippines) Ronato Alcano	•	Won		Won		Won		Won				Won		Won			Won	Won	Won			Won	Won			**11**
(Japan) **Yukio Akakariyama**			Won		Won		Won		Won	Won	Won		Won		Won	Won				Won	Won			Won	Won	**13**
