= 2011 WPA World Eight-ball Championship =

Eight-ball world championship

WPA World 8-Ball Championship 2011

Tournament information
- Sport: Eight-ball
- Location: Fujairah, United Arab Emirates
- Dates: February 19, 2011–February 26, 2011
- Tournament format: Double Elimination / Single Elimination
- Host: WPA World Eight-ball Championship
- Venue: Fujairah Exhibition Centre, Al Diar Siji Hotel
- Participants: 116

Final positions
- Champion: (Philippines) Dennis Orcollo
- Runner-up: (Netherlands) Niels Feijen

The 2011 WPA World Eight-ball Championship was an eight-ball world championship, organized by the World Pool-Billiard Association (WPA), and held 19–26 February 2011 at the Fujairah Exhibition Centre of the Al Diar Siji Hotel in Fujairah, United Arab Emirates. A total of 116 players from all of the WPA's six regions participated.

The event was won by Dennis Orcollo of the Philippines, who won the event with a 9–2 win in the final over Niels Feijen of the Netherlands. David Alcaide of Spain, and Darren Appleton of England were third and fourth respectively. The total prize money for the event was US$205,000. The event is also referred to as the 2011 Etisalat World 8 Ball Pool Championship, among other variations, for sponsorship purposes.

== Tournament format ==
- Double-elimination tournament on stage one until 56 players are left.
  - Race to seven racks
- Single-elimination tournament on stage two:
  - The undefeated players are seeded on stage 2 and the best eight will receive first round byes.
  - Race to nine racks, except for the final which is race to eleven.

=== Schedule and prize money ===
Stage	Date	Prize	Racks
Qualifying tournaments	February 12–18	US$0	7
Players' meeting	February 19	US$0	7
First round	February 20–24	US$0	7
Last 84	February 20–24	US$300	7
Last 56	February 20–24	US$1,000	9
Last 32	February 20–24	US$2,000	9
Last 16	February 20–24	US$3,500	9
Quarterfinals	February 20–24	US$6,000	9
Fourth place	February 26	US$10,000	9
Third place match	February 26	US$14,000	9
Runner up	February 26	US$25,000	11
Winner	February 26	US$40,000	11

=== Ranked players ===
- (England) Karl Boyes
- (Philippines) Francisco Bustamante
- (Philippines) Antonio Lining
- (Chinese Taipei) Kuo Po-cheng
- (Philippines) Jeff De Luna
- (Netherlands) Niels Feijen
- (Philippines) Vicenancio Tanio
- (Philippines) Marlon Manalo
- (Philippines) Oliver Medinilla
- (Philippines) Lee Vann Corteza
- (United States) Shane Van Boening
- (Russia) Ruslan Chinakhov
- (England) Scott Higgins
- (Philippines) Raymund Faron

== Stage 1 ==
=== Group A ===
Upper round 1
(England) Karl Boyes	7
(Bahrain) Fahad Khalaf Aljassas	0
(Saudi Arabia) Mohammeed Abdulmohsen Alhazmi	7
(Qatar) Abdulatif Mohammed Alfawal	6
(United States) Rodney Morris	7
(United Arab Emirates) Omran Salem	3
(Syria) Waed Al Fei	3
(Netherlands) Huidji See	7
1st playoff round
(Bahrain) Fahad Khalaf Aljassas	7
(Qatar) Abdulatif Mohammed Alfawal	5
(United Arab Emirates) Omran Salem	2
(Syria) Waed Al Fei	7

Upper round 2
(England) Karl Boyes	7
(Saudi Arabia) Mohammed Abdulmohsen Alhazmi	4
(United States) Rodney Morris	7
(Netherlands) Huidji See	5
2nd playoff round
(Bahrain) Fahad Khalaf Aljassas	0
(Netherlands) Huidji See	7
(Saudi Arabia) Mohammed Abdulmohsen Alhazmi	7
(Syria) Waed Al Fei	5

=== Group B ===
Upper round 1
(Philippines) Francisco Bustamante	7
(Spain) Carlos Cabello	3
(Philippines) Joven Bustamante	6
(England) Daryl Peach	7
(Netherlands) Nick van den Berg	7
(England) Mark Gray	3
(Spain) Francisco Sanchez-Ruiz	7
(Spain) David Alcaide	6
1st playoff round
(Spain) Carlos Cabello	6
(Philippines) Joven Bustamante	7
(England) Mark Gray	4
(Spain) David Alcaide	7

Upper round 2
(Philippines) Francisco Bustamante	6
(England) Daryl Peach	7
(Netherlands) Nick van den Berg	7
(Spain) Francisco Sanchez-Ruiz	2
2nd playoff round
(Philippines) Joven Bustamante	7
(Spain) Francisco Sanchez-Ruiz	5
(Philippines) Francisco Bustamante	5
(Spain) David Alcaide	7

=== Group C ===
Upper round 1
(Philippines) Antonio Lining	7
(Philippines) Joyme Vicente	0
(Philippines) Jepthant Palencia	7
(Hong Kong) Andrew Kong	4
(Philippines) Dennis Orcollo	7
(Lebanon) Mazen Berjawi	3
(Jordan) Shaker Wahdan	3
(Philippines) Efren Reyes	7
1st playoff round
(Philippines) Joyme Vicente	7
(Hong Kong) Andrew Kong	2
(Lebanon) Mazen Berjawi	6
(Jordan) Shaker Wahdan	7

Upper round 2
(Philippines) Antonio Lining	7
(Philippines) Jepthant Palencia	2
(Philippines) Dennis Orcollo	5
(Philippines) Efren Reyes	7
2nd playoff round
(Philippines) Joyme Vicente	3
(Philippines) Dennis Orcollo	7
(Philippines) Jepthant Palencia	6
(Jordan) Shaker Wahdan	7

=== Group D ===
Upper round 1
(Chinese Taipei) Kuo Po-cheng	7
(Saudi Arabia) Naif Al Jalweni	3
(Germany) Sascha-Andrej Tege	5
(Philippines) Joven Alba	7
(India) Alok Kumar	7
Ibrahim Saeed	2
(Philippines) Paul Ortega	0
(Chinese Taipei) Chang Jung-ling	7
1st playoff round
(Saudi Arabia) Naif Al Jalweni	7
(Germany) Sascha-Andrej Tege	5
Ibrahim Saeed	4
(Philippines) Paul Ortega	7

Upper round 2
(Chinese Taipei) Kuo Po-cheng	7
(Philippines) Joven Alba	5
(India) Alok Kumar	5
(Chinese Taipei) Chang Jung-ling	7
2nd playoff round
(Saudi Arabia) Naif Al Jalweni	4
(India) Alok Kumar	7
(Philippines) Joven Alba	7
(Philippines) Paul Ortega	4

=== Group E ===
Upper round 1
(Philippines) Jeff De Luna	5
(Kuwait) Khaled GH Almutairi	7
(Venezuela) Frailin Guanipa	4
(South Korea) Ham Won Sik	7
(Iran) Takhti Zarekani	7
(Hungary) Vilmos Földes	5
(Austria) Mario He	4
(Vietnam) Nguyen Phuc Long	7
1st playoff round
(Philippines) Jeff De Luna	7
(Venezuela) Frailin Guanipa	2
(Hungary) Vilmos Földes	7
(Austria) Mario He	2

Upper round 2
(Kuwait) Khaled GH Almutairi	6
(South Korea) Ham Won Sik	7
(Iran) Takhti Zarekani	3
(Vietnam) Nguyen Phuc Long	7
2nd playoff round
(Philippines) Jeff De Luna	6
(Iran) Takhti Zarekani	7
(Kuwait) Khaled GH Almutairi	5
(Hungary) Vilmos Földes	7

=== Group F ===
Upper round 1
(Netherlands) Niels Feijen	7
Elvis Casalang	4
(England) Raj Hundal	7
(South Korea) Jeong Young Hwa	5
(Italy) Bruno Muratore	7
Saleem Aljanbi	3
(United States) Corey Deuel	5
(Venezuela) Jalal Yousef	7
1st playoff round
Elvis Casalang	7
(South Korea) Jeong Young Hwa	6
Saleem Aljanbi	0
(United States) Corey Deuel	7

Upper round 2
(Netherlands) Niels Feijen	7
(England) Raj Hundal	6
(Italy) Bruno Muratore	5
(Venezuela) Jalal Yousef	7
2nd playoff round
Elvis Casalang	6
(Italy) Bruno Muratore	7
(England) Raj Hundal	7
(United States) Corey Deuel	4

=== Group G ===
Upper round 1
(Philippines) Ronato Alcano	7
(Morocco) Amine Ouahbi	4
(Philippines) Ramil Gallego	7
(Switzerland) David Plattner	1
(Croatia) Carlo Dalmatin	7
(United Arab Emirates) Majid Sultan	0
(Lebanon) Mohamad Ali Berjaoui	0
(Qatar) Bashar Hussain Abdulmajed	7
1st playoff round
(Morocco) Amine Ouahbi	7
(Switzerland) David Plattner	3
(United Arab Emirates) Majid Sultan	7
(Lebanon) Mohamad Ali Berjaoui	4

Upper round 2
(Philippines) Ronato Alcano	7
(Philippines) Ramil Gallego	4
(Croatia) Carlo Dalmatin	6
(Qatar) Bashar Hussain Abdulmajed	7
2nd playoff round
(Morocco) Amine Ouahbi	6
(Croatia) Carlo Dalmatin	7
(Philippines) Ramil Gallego	7
(United Arab Emirates) Majid Sultan	1

=== Group H ===
Upper round 1
(Philippines) Vicenancio Tanio	3
(Philippines) Feliciano Francisco	7
(England) Ricardo Jones	7
(United Arab Emirates) Abdulla Juma	3
(Portugal) Manuel Gama	5
(Germany) Oliver Ortmann	7
(United Arab Emirates) Ahmed Al Hosani	1
(Finland) Mika Immonen	7
1st playoff round
(Philippines) Vicenancio Tanio	7
(United Arab Emirates) Abdulla Juma	2
(Portugal) Manuel Gama	7
(United Arab Emirates) Ahmed Al Hosani	1

Upper round 2
(Philippines) Feliciano Francisco	7
(England) Ricardo Jones	5
(Germany) Oliver Ortmann	7
(Finland) Mika Immonen	2
2nd playoff round
(Philippines) Vicenancio Tanio	4
(Finland) Mika Immonen	7
(England) Ricardo Jones	5
(Portugal) Manuel Gama	7

=== Group I ===
Upper round 1
(Philippines) Oliver Medinilla	7
(Spain) Francisco Díaz-Pizarro	5
(Japan) Lo Li Wen	7
Sand Al Baloushi	0
(Iran) Moein Khedri	1
(Vietnam) Do Hoang Quan	7
(Kuwait) Omaral Shaheeme	6
(France) Stephan Cohen	7
1st playoff round
(Spain) Francisco Díaz-Pizarro	7
Sand Al Baloushi	3
(Iran) Moein Khedri	1
(Kuwait) Omaral Shaheeme	7

Upper round 2
(Philippines) Oliver Medinilla	7
(Japan) Lo Li Wen	1
(Vietnam) Do Hoang Quan	4
(France) Stephan Cohen	7
2nd playoff round
(Spain) Francisco Díaz-Pizarro	5
(Vietnam) Do Hoang Quan	7
(Japan) Lo Li Wen	6
(Kuwait) Omaral Shaheeme	7

=== Group J ===
Upper round 1
(Philippines) Lee Vann Corteza	7
(Japan) Tomoo Tanako	5
(Philippines) Allan Cuartero	5
(Iran) Mehdi Rasekhi	7
(Philippines) John Salazar	7
(Poland) Karol Skowerski	5
(Germany) Thomas Engert	7
(Canada) Jason Klatt	2
1st playoff round
(Japan) Tomoo Tanako	7
(Philippines) Allan Cuartero	5
(Poland) Karol Skowerski	1
(Canada) Jason Klatt	7

Upper round 2
(Philippines) Lee Vann Corteza	7
(Iran) Mehdi Rasekhi	3
(Philippines) John Salazar	6
(Germany) Thomas Engert	7
2nd playoff round
(Japan) Tomoo Tanako	4
(Philippines) John Salazar	7
(Iran) Mehdi Rasekhi	5
(Canada) Jason Klatt	7

=== Group K ===
Upper round 1
(United States) Shane Van Boening	7
(Syria) Basem Mohmad Aboud	0
(Singapore) Toh Lian Han	6
(Japan) Naoyuki Ōi	7
(England) Chris Melling	6
(Philippines) Roberto Gomez	7
(Hong Kong) Kenny Kwok	1
(Germany) Ralf Souquet	7
1st playoff round
(Syria) Basem Mohmad Aboud	6
(Singapore) Toh Lian Han	7
(England) Chris Melling	7
(Hong Kong) Kenny Kwok	6

Upper round 2
(United States) Shane Van Boening	3
(Japan) Naoyuki Ōi	7
(Philippines) Roberto Gomez	7
(Germany) Ralf Souquet	6
2nd playoff round
(Singapore) Toh Lian Han	1
(Germany) Ralf Souquet	7
(United States) Shane Van Boening	7
(England) Chris Melling	6

=== Group L ===
Upper round 1
(Russia) Ruslan Chinakhov	4
(Germany) Thorsten Hohmann	7
(United Arab Emirates) Mohammed AlHosani	7
(Morocco) Ameur Abdelati Riad	6
(South Africa) Zbynek Vaik	4
(Poland) Radosław Babica	7
(United Arab Emirates) Salah AlRemwy	0
(England) Darren Appleton	7
1st playoff round
(Russia) Ruslan Chinakhov	3
(Morocco) Ameur Abdelati Riad	7
(South Africa) Zbynek Vaik	5
(United Arab Emirates) Salah AlRemwy	7

Upper round 2
(Germany) Thorsten Hohmann	7
(United Arab Emirates) Mohammed AlHosani	4
(Poland) Radosław Babica	4
(England) Darren Appleton	7
2nd playoff round
(Morocco) Ameur Abdelati Riad	5
(Poland) Radosław Babica	7
(United Arab Emirates) Mohammed AlHosani	2
(United Arab Emirates) Salah AlRemwy	7

=== Group M ===
Upper round 1
(England) Scott Higgins	6
(Canada) Erik Hjorleifson	7
(United States) Earl Strickland	7
(India) Sumit Talwar	6
(Singapore) Tey Choon Kiat	6
(France) Vincent Facquet	7
(Jordan) Khaled Al Azoni	5
(Japan) Yukio Akakariyama	7
1st playoff round
(England) Scott Higgins	7
(India) Sumit Talwar	3
(Singapore) Tey Choon Kiat	7
(Jordan) Khaled Al Azoni	2

Upper round 2
(Canada) Erik Hjorleifson	4
(United States) Earl Strickland	7
(France) Vincent Facquet	7
(Japan) Yukio Akakariyama	5
2nd playoff round
(England) Scott Higgins	1
(Japan) Yukio Akakariyama	7
(Canada) Erik Hjorleifson	7
(Singapore) Tey Choon Kiat	3

=== Group N ===
Upper round 1
(Philippines) Raymund Faron	7
(United Arab Emirates) Hani Al Hory	5
(Russia) Konstantin Stepanov	7
(United Arab Emirates) Ali Saeed	5
(Philippines) Rodolfo Luat	7
(United Arab Emirates) Amin Fekry	3
(New Zealand) Daniel Hunia	3
(Sweden) Marcus Chamat	7
1st playoff round
(United Arab Emirates) Hani Al Hory	5
(United Arab Emirates) Ali Saeed	7
(United Arab Emirates) Amin Fekry	7
(New Zealand) Daniel Hunia	0

Upper round 2
(Philippines) Raymund Faron	5
(Russia) Konstantin Stepanov	7
(Philippines) Rodolfo Luat	7
(Sweden) Marcus Chamat	5
2nd playoff round
(United Arab Emirates) Ali Saeed	3
(Sweden) Marcus Chamat	7
(Philippines) Raymund Faron	7
(United Arab Emirates) Amin Fekry	4

== Stage 2 ==
=== Playoff ===
Vincent Facquet (FRA) defeated Phuc Lung Nguyen (VIE) 3–2 for eighth seed and the last bye to the Round of 32.

=== Upper half ===
Round of 56
(Croatia) Carlo Dalmatin	9
(Japan) Yukio Akakariyama	7
(Chinese Taipei) Kuo Po-cheng	4
(India) Alok Kumar	9
(Iran) Takhti Zarekani	9
(Germany) Thorsten Hohmann	8
(Vietnam) Phuc Long Nguyen	7
(United States) Shane Van Boening	9
(Canada) Jason Klatt	3
(Venezuela) Jalal Yousseff	9
(France) Stephan Cohen	0
(Philippines) Dennis Orcollo	9

Round of 32
(Philippines) Antonio Lining	4
(Croatia) Carlo Dalmatin	9
(India) Alok Kumar	6
(Iran) Takhti Zarekani	9
(United States) Shane Van Boening	9
(Venezuela) Jalal Yousseff	2
(Philippines) Dennis Orcollo	9
(France) Vincent Facquet	8

Round of 16
(Croatia) Carlo Dalmatin	4
(Iran) Takhti Zarekani	9
(United States) Shane Van Boening	2
(Philippines) Dennis Orcollo	9

Quarterfinals
(Iran) Takhti Zarekani	2
(Philippines) Dennis Orcollo	9

Round of 56
(Poland) Radosław Babica	2
(Philippines) Roberto Gomez	9
(Japan) Naoyuki Ōi	3
(Spain) David Alcaide	9
(Philippines) John Salazar	6
(Philippines) Lee Vann Corteza	9
(Germany) Thomas Engert	9
(Philippines) Raymund Faraon	8
(Canada) Erik Hjorleifson	2
(United States) Earl Strickland	9
(Finland) Mika Immonen	9
(Italy) Bruno Muratore	4

Round of 32
(Chinese Taipei) Chang Jung-lin	9
(Philippines) Roberto Gomez	6
(Spain) David Alcaide	9
(Philippines) Lee Vann Corteza	3
(Germany) Thomas Engert	9
(United States) Earl Strickland	7
(Finland) Mika Immonen	9
(England) Karl Boyes	1

Round of 16
(Chinese Taipei) Chang Jung-lin	6
(Spain) David Alcaide	9
(Germany) Thomas Engert	9
(Finland) Mika Immonen	1

Quarterfinals
(Spain) David Alcaide	9
(Germany) Thomas Engert	6

=== Lower half ===
Round of 56
(Philippines) Joven Bustamante	7
(Germany) Ralf Souquet	9
(Philippines) Rodolfo Luat	5
(Kuwait) Omaral Shaheeme	9
(Portugal) Manuel Gama	9
(Philippines) Feliciano Francisco	7
(United States) Rodney Morris	9
(Philippines) Ramil Gallego	6
(Vietnam) Do Hoang Quan	6
(Netherlands) Niels Feijen	9
(England) Daryl Peach	6
(Hungary) Vilmos Földes	9

Round of 32
(Netherlands) Nick van den Berg	9
(Germany) Ralf Souquet	1
(Kuwait) Omaral Shaheeme	9
(Portugal) Manuel Gama	4
(United States) Rodney Morris	2
(Netherlands) Niels Feijen	9
(Hungary) Vilmos Földes	5
(Philippines) Oliver Medinilla	9

Round of 16
(Netherlands) Nick van den Berg	9
(Kuwait) Omaral Shaheeme	4
(Netherlands) Niels Feijen	9
(Philippines) Oliver Medinilla	4

Quarterfinals
(Netherlands) Nick van den Berg	8
(Netherlands) Niels Feijen	9

Round of 56
(United Arab Emirates) Salah AlRemwy	9
(South Korea) Ham Won Sik	5
(Russia) Konstantin Stepanov	0
(England) Raj Hundal	9
(Philippines) Joven Alba	9
(Philippines) Efren Reyes	5
(Philippines) Ronato Alcano	9
(Jordan) Shaker Wahdan	2
(Saudi Arabia) Mohammed Abdulmohsen Alhazmi	2
(Germany) Oliver Ortmann	9
(Sweden) Marcus Chamat	7
(Netherlands) Huidji See	9

Round of 32
(Qatar) Bashar Hussain Abdulmajed	9
(United Arab Emirates) Salah AlRemwy	5
(England) Raj Hundal	7
(Philippines) Joven Alba	9
(Philippines) Ronato Alcano	9
(Germany) Oliver Ortmann	6
(Netherlands) Huidji See	3
(England) Darren Appleton	9

Round of 16
(Qatar) Bashar Hussain Abdulmajed	4
(Philippines) Joven Alba	9
(Philippines) Ronato Alcano	8
(England) Darren Appleton	9

Quarterfinals
(Philippines) Joven Alba	2
(England) Darren Appleton	9

=== Semifinals and Final ===
Semifinals
--	(Philippines) Dennis Orcollo	9
--	(Spain) David Alcaide	3
6	(Netherlands) Niels Feijen	9
--	(England) Darren Appleton	0

Final
--	(Philippines) Dennis Orcollo	10
6	(Netherlands) Niels Feijen	3
Third place match
--	(Spain) David Alcaide	9
--	(England) Darren Appleton	2
