= 2012 WPA World Eight-ball Championship =

WPA World 8-Ball Championship 2012
Tournament information
- Sport: Nine-ball
- Location: Fujairah, United Arab Emirates
- Dates: February 11, 2012–February 18, 2012
- Tournament format: Double Elimination / Single Elimination
- Host: WPA World Eight-ball Championship
- Venue: Fujairah Exhibition Centre, Al Diar Siji Hotel
- Participants: 96

Final positions
- Champion: (Chinese Taipei) Chang Jung-lin
- Runner-up: (Chinese Taipei) Fu Che-wei

The 2012 WPA World Eight-ball Championship was a professional eight-ball championship, organized by the World Pool-Billiard Association (WPA), and held 11–18 February 2012 at the Fujairah Exhibition Centre of the Al Diar Siji Hotel in Fujairah, United Arab Emirates. A total of 96 players from all of the WPA's six regions participated.

Dennis Orcollo winner of the 2012 event lost in the round of 32 to Karol Skowerski. The event was won by Chang Jung-lin, who defeated Fu Che-wei in the final 11–6.

== Prize money ==
	prize
Winner	20.000 US-$
Finalist	15.000 US-$
Semifinalist	7.500 US-$
Quarterfinalist	4.500 US-$
Last 16	3.000 US-$
Last 32	2.000 US-$
First round	900 US-$
Pre-qualifier	250 US-$
Total	156.800 US-$

== Finals ==
Round of 64
(Philippines) Dennis Orcollo	9
(United Arab Emirates) Nasser al-Mujaibel	5
(Jordan) Shaker Wahdan	6
(Poland) Karol Skowerski	9
(Chinese Taipei) Kuo Po-cheng	5
(Hungary) Vilmos Földes	9
(United Arab Emirates) Abdulatef Fawal	6
(China) Liu Haitao	9
(Netherlands) Niels Feijen	9
(United Arab Emirates) Saleh Mohamed	1
(Chinese Taipei) Ko Pin-yi	9
(Philippines) Raymund Faraon	5
(Venezuela) Jalal Yousef	9
(Russia) Konstantin Stepanov	5
(United States) Max Eberle	9
(Germany) Ralf Souquet	7
(Philippines) Lee Vann Corteza	9
(Hong Kong) Lee Chen Man	2
(Vietnam) Nguyen Phuc Long	9
(United Arab Emirates) Amin Fekry	8
(South Korea) Hwang Yong	9
(Philippines) Demosthenes Pulpul	8
(Germany) Reiner Wirsbitzki	7
(Chinese Taipei) Fu Che-wei	9
(Finland) Mika Immonen	9
(United Arab Emirates) Omran Salem	7
(United Arab Emirates) Ahmad Jallad	9
(Philippines) Joven Alba	8
(England) Imran Majid	9
(Singapore) Kenny Kwok	5
(Germany) Dominic Jentsch	4
(Netherlands) Huidji See	9
(England) Darren Appleton	3
(China) Li Hewen	9
(Iran) So Shaw	7
(Belgium) Serge Das	9
(England) Karl Boyes	7
(Netherlands) Nick van den Berg	9
(Germany) Oliver Ortmann	9
(Japan) Lo Li-wen	3
(Philippines) Carlo Biado	9
(Philippines) Elmer Haya	2
(Poland) Tomasz Kapłan	7
(Japan) Tōru Kuribayashi	9
(Italy) Bruno Muratore	9
(Poland) Radosław Babica	4
(Spain) Carlos Cabello	6
(Chinese Taipei) Chang Jung-lin	9
(England) Chris Melling	9
(United Arab Emirates) Omer al-Serkal	5
(England) Daryl Peach	5
(United Arab Emirates) Sakah al-Rimawi	9
(Kuwait) Omar Al-Shaheen	4
(Spain) Francisco Díaz-Pizarro	9
(Japan) Ryoji Aoki	2
(Germany) Thorsten Hohmann	9
(Philippines) Roberto Gomez	9
(Austria) Mario He	4
(United Arab Emirates) Maghsoud Ali	3
(England) Mark Gray	9
(Japan) Hayato Hijikata	9
(Iran) Takhti Zarekani	8
(Philippines) Elvis Calasang	2
(Japan) Yukio Akakariyama	9

Round of 32
(Philippines) Dennis Orcollo	3
(Poland) Karol Skowerski	9
(Hungary) Vilmos Földes	8
(China) Liu Haitao	9
(Netherlands) Niels Feijen	2
(Chinese Taipei) Ko Pin-yi	9
(Venezuela) Jalal Yousef	9
(United States) Max Eberle	2
(Philippines) Lee Vann Corteza	9
(Vietnam) Nguyen Phuc Long	4
(South Korea) Hwang Yong	0
(Chinese Taipei) Fu Che-wei	9
(Finland) Mika Immonen	9
(United Arab Emirates) Ahmad Jallad	2
(England) Imran Majid	5
(Netherlands) Huidji See	9
(China) Li Hewen	9
(Belgium) Serge Das	6
(Netherlands) Nick van den Berg	8
(Germany) Oliver Ortmann	9
(Philippines) Carlo Biado	9
(Japan) Tōru Kuribayashi	1
(Italy) Bruno Muratore	5
(Chinese Taipei) Chang Jung-lin	9
(England) Chris Melling	9
(United Arab Emirates) Sakah al-Rimawi	8
(Spain) Francisco Díaz-Pizarro	6
(Germany) Thorsten Hohmann	9
(Philippines) Roberto Gomez	9
(England) Mark Gray	6
(Japan) Hayato Hijikata	7
(Japan) Yukio Akakariyama	9

Round of 16
(Poland) Karol Skowerski	4
(China) Liu Haitao	9
(Chinese Taipei) Ko Pin-yi	9
(Venezuela) Jalal Yousef	7
(Philippines) Lee Vann Corteza	5
(Chinese Taipei) Fu Che-wei	9
(Finland) Mika Immonen	8
(Netherlands) Huidji See	9
(China) Li Hewen	7
(Germany) Oliver Ortmann	9
(Philippines) Carlo Biado	5
(Chinese Taipei) Chang Jung-lin	9
(England) Chris Melling	9
(Germany) Thorsten Hohmann	4
(Philippines) Roberto Gomez	9
(Japan) Yukio Akakariyama	5

Quarter final
(China) Liu Haitao	9
(Chinese Taipei) Ko Pin-yi	8
(Chinese Taipei) Fu Che-wei	9
(Netherlands) Huidji See	4
(Germany) Oliver Ortmann	3
(Chinese Taipei) Chang Jung-lin	9
(England) Chris Melling	9
(Philippines) Roberto Gomez	4

Semifinal
(China) Liu Haitao	3
(Chinese Taipei) Fu Che-wei	9
(Chinese Taipei) Chang Jung-lin	9
(England) Chris Melling	7

Final
(Chinese Taipei) Fu Che-wei	6
(Chinese Taipei) Chang Jung-lin	11
