= 2010 WPA World Nine-ball Championship =

WPA World 9-Ball Championship 2010
Tournament information
- Sport: 9-ball
- Location: Doha, Qatar
- Dates: 25 June 2010–5 July 2010
- Tournament format: Double elimination / Single elimination
- Host: WPA World Nine-ball Championship
- Participants: 128

Final positions
- Champion: PHL Francisco Bustamante
- Runner-up: TPE Kuo Po-cheng

The 2010 WPA World Nine-ball Championship was the professional nine-ball pocket billiards (pool) championship, sanctioned by the World Pool-Billiard Association (WPA). It was held from 29 June through 5 July in Doha, Qatar, hosted by the Qatar Billiards and Snooker Federation. Qualifying tournaments were held from 25 through 29 June in the same city.

== Tournament format ==
- Double elimination tournament during the group stage. All matches are races to nine racks.
- There are 16 groups; each group has eight players. Two wins qualifies the player to the knockout round, while two losses eliminates them.
- Single elimination tournament during the knockout stage. All matches are races to eleven racks, except for the final which is race to 13.

== Group stage ==
=== Group 1 ===
Upper round 1
(United States) Shane Van Boening	9
(Saudi Arabia) Abdulla a. Al Daham	6
(Lebanon) Mazen Berjawi	6
(Iran) Hasan Zeraatgar	9
(United Kingdom) Imran Majid	6
(Poland) Mariusz Skoneczny	9
(Malaysia) Ibrahim Bin Amir	9
(Italy) Bruno Muratore	7
1st playoff round
(Saudi Arabia) Abdulla a. Al Daham	6
(Lebanon) Mazen Berjawi	9
(United Kingdom) Imran Majid	7
(Italy) Bruno Muratore	9

Upper round 2
(United States) Shane Van Boening	9
(Iran) Hasan Zeraatgar	7
(Poland) Mariusz Skoneczny	5
(Malaysia) Ibrahim Bin Amir	9
2nd playoff round
(Lebanon) Mazen Berjawi	9
(Poland) Mariusz Skoneczny	2
(Iran) Hasan Zeraatgar	3
(Italy) Bruno Muratore	9

=== Group 2 ===
Upper round 1
(Chinese Taipei) Lu Hui Chan	9
(Sweden) Jim Chawki	6
(Canada) Francis Crevier	9
(Hong Kong) Kenny Kwok	7
(Philippines) Marlon Manalo	8
(United Arab Emirates) Joven Alba	9
(United Kingdom) Scott Higgins	9
(Qatar) Waleed Majid	6
1st playoff round
(Sweden) Jim Chawki	7
(Hong Kong) Kenny Kwok	9
(Philippines) Marlon Manalo	9
(Qatar) Waleed Majid	7

Upper round 2
(Chinese Taipei) Lu Hui Chan	9
(Canada) Francis Crevier	3
(United Arab Emirates) Joven Alba	4
(United Kingdom) Scott Higgins	9
2nd playoff round
(Hong Kong) Kenny Kwok	5
(United Arab Emirates) Joven Alba	9
(Canada) Francis Crevier	2
(Philippines) Marlon Manalo	9

=== Group 3 ===
Upper round 1
(Germany) Thorsten Hohmann	7
(United States) Charles Williams	9
(Serbia) Sandor Tot	9
(Japan) Kazuki Nishimura	4
(France) Stephan Cohen	9
(South Korea) Ham Won Sik	3
(Hong Kong) Lee Chenman	9
(Iraq) Hussain Jaffer	4
1st playoff round
(Germany) Thorsten Hohmann	9
(Japan) Kazuki Nishimura	4
(South Korea) Ham Won Sik	9
(Iraq) Hussain Jaffer	8

Upper round 2
(United States) Charles Williams	8
(Serbia) Sandor Tot	9
(France) Stephan Cohen	9
(Hong Kong) Lee Chenman	6
2nd playoff round
(Germany) Thorsten Hohmann	6
(Hong Kong) Lee Chenman	9
(United States) Charles Williams	9
(South Korea) Ham Won Sik	6

=== Group 4 ===
Upper round 1
(Chinese Taipei) Yang Ching Shun	9
(Lebanon) Mohd. Ali Berjawi	3
(Mexico) Ernesto Dominguez	5
(Netherlands) Huidji See	9
(United Kingdom) Karl Boyes	9
(Malaysia) Lee Poh Soon	0
(Qatar) Ali Obaidly	3
(Malta) Tony Drago	9
1st playoff round
(Lebanon) Mohd. Ali Berjawi	3
(Mexico) Ernesto Dominguez	9
(Malaysia) Lee Poh Soon	9
(Qatar) Ali Obaidly	4

Upper round 2
(Chinese Taipei) Yang Ching Shun	9
(Netherlands) Huidji See	5
(United Kingdom) Karl Boyes	4
(Malta) Tony Drago	9
2nd playoff round
(Mexico) Ernesto Dominguez	9
(United Kingdom) Karl Boyes	7
(Netherlands) Huidji See	6
(Malaysia) Lee Poh Soon	9

=== Group 5 ===
Upper round 1
(Syria) Basem Aboud	5
(United Kingdom) So Shaw	9
(Egypt) Wael Tallat	5
(United Arab Emirates) Hanni Al Howri	9
(Philippines) Francisco Bustamante	9
(Italy) Fabio Petroni	7
(Saudi Arabia) Mohd. A. Al Harthi	3
(Japan) Tohru Kuribayashi	9
1st playoff round
(Syria) Basem Aboud	9
(Egypt) Wael Tallat	8
(Italy) Fabio Petroni	9
(Saudi Arabia) Mohd. A. Al Harthi	4

Upper round 2
(United Kingdom) So Shaw	5
(United Arab Emirates) Hanni Al Howri	9
(Philippines) Francisco Bustamante	9
(Japan) Tohru Kuribayashi	6
2nd playoff round
(Syria) Basem Aboud	3
(Japan) Tohru Kuribayashi	9
(United Kingdom) So Shaw	9
(Italy) Fabio Petroni	8

=== Group 6 ===
Upper round 1
(United States) Rodney Morris	9
(Venezuela) Yousseff Jalar	4
(China) Dang Jinhu	9
(Germany) Heck Helmut	9
(Netherlands) Niels Feijen	9
(United Arab Emirates) Mohd. H. Al Hosani	1
(Singapore) Chan Keng Kwang	7
(Philippines) Alen Cuarcero	9
1st playoff round
(Venezuela) Yousseff Jalar	9
(Germany) Heck Helmut	4
(United Arab Emirates) Mohd. H. Al Hosani	8
(Singapore) Chan Keng Kwang	9

Upper round 2
(United States) Rodney Morris	8
(China) Dang Jinhu	9
(Netherlands) Niels Feijen	6
(Philippines) Alen Cuarcero	9
2nd playoff round
(Venezuela) Yousseff Jalar	9
(Netherlands) Niels Feijen	6
(United States) Rodney Morris	7
(Singapore) Chan Keng Kwang	9

=== Group 7 ===
Upper round 1
(Japan) Yukio Akakariyama	4
(Canada) John Morra	9
(Greece) Aleksandros Kazaqi	4
(United Arab Emirates) Salah Al Riwani	9
(Chinese Taipei) Kuo Po Chen	5
(Germany) Thomas Engert	9
(United Kingdom) Craig Osbome	9
(Australia) Ben Judge	5
1st playoff round
(Japan) Yukio Akakariyama	9
(Greece) Aleksandros Kazaqi	0
(Chinese Taipei) Kuo Po Chen	9
(Australia) Ben Judge	8

Upper round 2
(Canada) John Morra	9
(United Arab Emirates) Salah Al Riwani	5
(Germany) Thomas Engert	8
(United Kingdom) Craig Osbome	9
2nd playoff round
(Japan) Yukio Akakariyama	9
(Germany) Thomas Engert	5
(United Arab Emirates) Salah Al Riwani	2
(Chinese Taipei) Kuo Po Chen	9

=== Group 8 ===
Upper round 1
(Qatar) Bashar Hussain	9
(Egypt) Mohammad Al Asaal	6
(Japan) Masaaki Tanaka	9
(Iran) Mehdi Rasekhi	4
(Sweden) Marcus Chamat	9
(United States) Oscar Dominguez	8
(Russia) Konstantin Stepanov	9
(Spain) Del Amo Hector	2
1st playoff round
(Egypt) Mohammad Al Asaal	9
(Iran) Mehdi Rasekhi	8
(United States) Oscar Dominguez	5
(Spain) Del Amo Hector	8

Upper round 2
(Qatar) Bashar Hussain	2
(Japan) Masaaki Tanaka	9
(Sweden) Marcus Chamat	8
(Russia) Konstantin Stepanov	9
2nd playoff round
(Egypt) Mohammad Al Asaal	8
(Sweden) Marcus Chamat	9
(Qatar) Bashar Hussain	9
(Spain) Del Amo Hector	4

=== Group 9 ===
Upper round 1
(Germany) Ralf Souquet	6
(Philippines) Dennis Orcollo	9
(United Kingdom) Chris Melling	9
(Nicaragua) Carlo Castro	2
(Qatar) Mohd Al Bin Ali	8
(Saudi Arabia) Fahad S. Al Barak	9
(South Korea) Jeong Young Hwa	6
(Philippines) Oliver Medenilla	9
1st playoff round
(Germany) Ralf Souquet	9
(Nicaragua) Carlo Castro	1
(Qatar) Mohd Al Bin Ali	5
(South Korea) Jeong Young Hwa	9

Upper round 2
(Philippines) Dennis Orcollo	9
(United Kingdom) Chris Melling	4
(Saudi Arabia) Fahad S. Al Barak	6
(Philippines) Oliver Medenilla	9
2nd playoff round
(Germany) Ralf Souquet	9
(Saudi Arabia) Fahad S. Al Barak	0
(United Kingdom) Chris Melling	9
(South Korea) Jeong Young Hwa	1

=== Group 10 ===
Upper round 1
(United States) Johnny Archer	9
(Singapore) Toh Lian Han	3
(Brunei) Abas Ali	2
(Germany) Jakob Belka	9
(United Kingdom) Daryl Peach	8
(Philippines) Israel Rota	9
(Ukraine) Artem Koshovoj	8
(Vietnam) Nguyen Phuc Long	9
1st playoff round
(Singapore) Toh Lian Han	9
(Brunei) Abas Ali	3
(United Kingdom) Daryl Peach	8
(Ukraine) Artem Koshovoj	9

Upper round 2
(United States) Johnny Archer	9
(Germany) Jakob Belka	8
(Philippines) Israel Rota	9
(Vietnam) Nguyen Phuc Long	6
2nd playoff round
(Singapore) Toh Lian Han	6
(Vietnam) Nguyen Phuc Long	9
(Germany) Jakob Belka	7
(Ukraine) Artem Koshovoj	9

=== Group 11 ===
Upper round 1
(Philippines) Lee Vann Corteza	9
(Syria) Ibrahim Al Khadar	1
(Germany) Christian Reimering	9
(Poland) Carol Skowersui	5
(Chinese Taipei) Ko Pin Yi	9
(India) Sundeep Gulati	1
(Qatar) Mohanna Obaidly	6
(Croatia) Carlo Dalmatin	9
1st playoff round
(Syria) Ibrahim Al Khadar	9
(Poland) Carol Skowersui	6
(India) Sundeep Gulati	3
(Qatar) Mohanna Obaidly	9

Upper round 2
(Philippines) Lee Vann Corteza	5
(Germany) Christian Reimering	9
(Chinese Taipei) Ko Pin Yi	9
(Croatia) Carlo Dalmatin	7
2nd playoff round
(Syria) Ibrahim Al Khadar	5
(Croatia) Carlo Dalmatin	9
(Philippines) Lee Vann Corteza	9
(Qatar) Mohanna Obaidly	3

=== Group 12 ===
Upper round 1
(United Kingdom) Mark Gray	2
(Philippines) Raymund Faron	9
(Netherlands) Nick van den Berg	9
(Indonesia) Mohd. Bewi Simanjuntak	2
(United Kingdom) Darren Appleton	3
(Canada) Jason Klatt	9
(Chinese Taipei) Chang Jung Lin	9
(Algeria) Taqi Aldin Moustafawi	2
1st playoff round
(United Kingdom) Mark Gray	9
(Indonesia) Mohd. Bewi Simanjuntak	4
(United Kingdom) Darren Appleton	4
(Algeria) Taqi Aldin Moustafawi	9

Upper round 2
(Philippines) Raymund Faron	9
(Netherlands) Nick van den Berg	8
(Canada) Jason Klatt	2
(Chinese Taipei) Chang Jung Lin	9
2nd playoff round
(United Kingdom) Mark Gray	3
(Canada) Jason Klatt	9
(Netherlands) Nick van den Berg	9
(Algeria) Taqi Aldin Moustafawi	1

=== Group 13 ===
Upper round 1
(Philippines) Jeff De Luna	6
(Thailand) Nitiwat Kanjanasri	9
(Canada) Alain Martel	9
(United Kingdom) Richard Jones	6
(Poland) Radosław Babica	2
(Japan) Hayato Hijikata	9
(Kuwait) Khalid K. Almutari	9
(Qatar) Abdulatif Fawal	3
1st playoff round
(Philippines) Jeff De Luna	9
(United Kingdom) Richard Jones	6
(Poland) Radosław Babica	9
(Qatar) Abdulatif Fawal	7

Upper round 2
(Thailand) Nitiwat Kanjanasri	9
(Canada) Alain Martel	3
(Japan) Hayato Hijikata	9
(Kuwait) Khalid K. Almutari	5
2nd playoff round
(Philippines) Jeff De Luna	9
(Kuwait) Khalid K. Almutari	3
(Canada) Alain Martel	9
(Poland) Radosław Babica	8

=== Group 14 ===
Upper round 1
(Philippines) Antonio Lining	9
(United States) Corey Deuel	7
(Austria) Martin Kempter	8
(United Arab Emirates) Khalid Al Kamale	9
(Philippines) Antonio Gabica	9
(United Kingdom) Nicolas Ottermann	7
(Indonesia) Muhammad Zulfikri	8
(Philippines) Francisco Felicilda	9
1st playoff round
(United States) Corey Deuel	9
(Austria) Martin Kempter	2
(United Kingdom) Nicolas Ottermann	5
(Indonesia) Muhammad Zulfikri	9

Upper round 2
(Philippines) Antonio Lining	9
(United Arab Emirates) Khalid Al Kamale	5
(Philippines) Antonio Gabica	8
(Philippines) Francisco Felicilda	9
2nd playoff round
(United States) Corey Deuel	3
(Philippines) Antonio Gabica	9
(United Arab Emirates) Khalid Al Kamale	8
(Indonesia) Muhammad Zulfikri	9

=== Group 15 ===
Upper round 1
(Finland) Mika Immonen	9
(Kuwait) Majid N. Alazmi	3
(Iraq) Ihab Hassan	9
(Qatar) Alaa Bata	5
(Philippines) Efren Reyes	5
(China) Liu Haitao	9
(Germany) Holger Gries	5
(Philippines) Vinancio Tanio	9
1st playoff round
(Kuwait) Majid N. Alazmi	9
(Qatar) Alaa Bata	1
(Philippines) Efren Reyes	9
(Germany) Holger Gries	7

Upper round 2
(Finland) Mika Immonen	9
(Iraq) Ihab Hassan	4
(China) Liu Haitao	8
(Philippines) Vinancio Tanio	9
2nd playoff round
(Kuwait) Majid N. Alazmi	5
(China) Liu Haitao	9
(Iraq) Ihab Hassan	0
(Philippines) Efren Reyes	9

=== Group 16 ===
Upper round 1
(Spain) David Alcaide	9
(South Africa) Jason Theron	6
(Philippines) Ronato Alcano	9
(Iraq) Ahmed Hassan	1
(Indonesia) Ricky Yang	8
(Switzerland) Dimitri Jungo	9
(Qatar) Taher Hussain	2
(Germany) Oliver Ortmann	9
1st playoff round
(South Africa) Jason Theron	6
(Iraq) Ahmed Hassan	9
(Indonesia) Ricky Yang	9
(Qatar) Taher Hussain	2

Upper round 2
(Spain) David Alcaide	5
(Philippines) Ronato Alcano	9
(Switzerland) Dimitri Jungo	9
(Germany) Oliver Ortmann	6
2nd playoff round
(Iraq) Ahmed Hassan	3
(Germany) Oliver Ortmann	9
(Spain) David Alcaide	9
(Indonesia) Ricky Yang	7

== Knockout stage ==
=== Upper half ===
Round of 64
(Chinese Taipei) Chang Jung Lin	9
(Philippines) Jeffry De Luna	11
(Philippines) Francisco Felicilda	11
(Qatar) Bashar Hussain	7
(Philippines) Raymund Farun	11
(Ukraine) Artem Koshovoj	8
(United Kingdom) Scott Higgins	11
(United States) Charles Williams	9
(Chinese Taipei) Lu Hui Chan	8
(Philippines) Marlon Manalo	11
(United States) Shane Van Boening	11
(United Arab Emirates) Joven Alba	7
(Philippines) Francisco Bustamante	11
(Germany) Oliver Ortmann	2
(Chinese Taipei) Ko Pin Yi	11
(Mexico) Ernesto Dominguez	3

Round of 32
(Philippines) Jeffry De Luna	10
(Philippines) Francisco Felicilda	11
(Philippines) Raymund Farun	11
(United Kingdom) Scott Higgins	10
(Philippines) Marlon Manalo	11
(United States) Shane Van Boening	7
(Philippines) Francisco Bustamante	11
(Chinese Taipei) Ko Pin Yi	8

Round of 16
(Philippines) Francisco Felicilda	11
(Philippines) Raymund Farun	8
(Philippines) Marlon Manalo	6
(Philippines) Francisco Bustamante	11

Quarterfinals
(Philippines) Francisco Felicilda	5
(Philippines) Francisco Bustamante	11

Round of 64
(Malta) Tony Drago	11
(Philippines) Lee Vann Corteza	7
(United Kingdom) Craig Osbome	11
(Philippines) Antonio Gabica	4
(Philippines) Oliver Medenilla	11
(Japan) Yukio Akakariyama	9
(Thailand) Nitiwat Kanjanasri	11
(United Kingdom) So Shaw	4
(United Arab Emirates) Hanni Al Howri	2
(Vietnam) Nguyen Phuc Long	11
(Philippines) Antonio Lining	11
(Malaysia) Lee Poh Soon	7
(Switzerland) Dimitri Jungo	11
(Venezuela) Yousseff Jaffar	2
(Finland) Mika Immonen	3
(Hong Kong) Lee Chenman	11

Round of 32
(Malta) Tony Drago	8
(United Kingdom) Craig Osbome	11
(Philippines) Oliver Medenilla	11
(Thailand) Nitiwat Kanjanasri	9
(Vietnam) Nguyen Phuc Long	6
(Philippines) Antonio Lining	11
(Switzerland) Dimitri Jungo	11
(Hong Kong) Lee Chenman	8

Round of 16
(United Kingdom) Craig Osbome	9
(Philippines) Oliver Medenilla	11
(Philippines) Antonio Lining	11
(Switzerland) Dimitri Jungo	8

Quarterfinals
(Philippines) Oliver Medenilla	10
(Philippines) Antonio Lining	11

=== Lower half ===
Round of 64
(Japan) Masaaki Tanaka	11
(Canada) Alain Martel	8
(Philippines) Israel Rota	8
(Canada) Jason Klatt	11
(United States) Johnny Archer	11
(Philippines) Efren Reyes	10
(Philippines) Dennis Orcollo	7
(Italy) Bruno Muratore	11
(France) Stephan Cohen	9
(Poland) Mariusz Skoneczny	11
(Serbia) Sandor Tot	11
(Sweden) Marcus Chamat	5
(Philippines) Vinancio Tanio	11
(Germany) Ralf Souquet	2
(Japan) Hayato Hijikata	11
(China) Liu Haitao	11

Round of 32
(Japan) Masaaki Tanaka	10
(Canada) Jason Klatt	11
(United States) Johnny Archer	11
(Italy) Bruno Muratore	7
(Poland) Mariusz Skoneczny	6
(Serbia) Sandor Tot	11
(Philippines) Vinancio Tanio	5
(Japan) Hayato Hijikata	11

Round of 16
(Canada) Jason Klatt	8
(United States) Johnny Archer	11
(Serbia) Sandor Tot	11
(Japan) Hayato Hijikata	8

Quarterfinals
(United States) Johnny Archer	11
(Serbia) Sandor Tot	6

Round of 64
(Chinese Taipei) Yang Ching Shun	11
(Spain) David Alcaide	7
(Philippines) Alen Cuarcero	6
(Netherlands) Nick van den Berg	11
(Malaysia) Ibrahim Bin Amir	11
(Singapore) Chan Keng Kwang	7
(Canada) John Morra	9
(Chinese Taipei) Kuo Po Chen	11
(Germany) Christian Reimering	11
(Croatia) Carlo Dalmatin	9
(Russia) Konstantin Stepanov	9
(Japan) Tohru Kuribayashi	11
(China) Dang Jinhu	11
(United Kingdom) Chris Melling	2
(Philippines) Ronato Alcano	11
(Indonesia) Muhammad Zulfikri	6

Round of 32
(Chinese Taipei) Yang Ching Shun	11
(Netherlands) Nick van den Berg	9
(Malaysia) Ibrahim Bin Amir	10
(Chinese Taipei) Kuo Po Chen	11
(Germany) Christian Reimering	11
(Japan) Tohru Kuribayashi	6
(China) Dang Jinhu	7
(Philippines) Ronato Alcano	11

Round of 16
(Chinese Taipei) Yang Ching Shun	9
(Chinese Taipei) Kuo Po Chen	11
(Germany) Christian Reimering	11
(Philippines) Ronato Alcano	8

Quarterfinals
(Chinese Taipei) Kuo Po Chen	11
(Philippines) Ronato Alcano	5

=== Semifinals and Final ===
Semifinals
(Philippines) Francisco Bustamante	11
(Philippines) Antonio Lining	5
(United States) Johnny Archer	10
(Chinese Taipei) Kuo Po Chen	11

Finals
(Philippines) Francisco Bustamante	13
(Chinese Taipei) Kuo Po Chen	7
