= WPA World Eight-ball Championship =

World Championship in pool, played in Eight-ball

- Sport: Pool
- Founded: 2004
- Founder: World Pool-Billiard Association
- Most recent champions: Aloysius Yapp (2026); Chezka Centeno (2026)
- Related competitions: Nine-ball, Ten-ball
- Website: wpapool.com

The WPA World Eight-ball Championship is a professional eight-ball pool tournament sanctioned by the World Pool Association (WPA), initially contested from 2004 to 2012 in Fujairah, United Arab Emirates. After not being held for several years, it was announced by the WPA that the championship would return in 2017, to be held at the Olympic Centre in Jinan, China. However, that event did not occur, and the championship continued to remain dormant until Predator Cues re-established the tournament as part of their Pro Billiard Series, beginning with the 2022 edition of the tournament.

== Winners ==
=== Men's ===
Year	Host	Final			Semifinalists
Year	Host	Winner	Score	Runner-up	Semifinalists
2004	United Arab Emirates	(Philippines); Efren Reyes	11–4	(Philippines); Marlon Manalo	(Philippines); Francisco Bustamante	(Philippines); Alex Pagulayan
2005	United Arab Emirates	(Chinese Taipei); Wu Jia-qing	11–5	(Netherlands); Nick van den Berg	(Philippines); Francisco Bustamante	(Netherlands); Niels Feijen
2007	United Arab Emirates	(Philippines); Ronato Alcano	11–8	(Philippines); Dennis Orcollo	(Netherlands); Niels Feijen	(Philippines); Joven Bustamante
2008	United Arab Emirates	(Germany); Ralf Souquet	13–9	(Philippines); Ronato Alcano	(Sweden); Marcus Chamat	(Philippines); Dennis Orcollo
2010	United Arab Emirates	(England); Karl Boyes	13–12	(Netherlands); Niels Feijen	(Russia); Ruslan Chinakhov	(England); Darren Appleton
2011	United Arab Emirates	(Philippines); Dennis Orcollo	10–3	(Netherlands); Niels Feijen	(Spain); David Alcaide	(England); Darren Appleton
2012	United Arab Emirates	(Chinese Taipei); Chang Jung-lin	11–6	(Chinese Taipei); Fu Che-wei	(England); Chris Melling	(China); Liu Haitao
2022	Puerto Rico	(Spain); Francisco Sánchez Ruiz	10–6	(Poland); Wiktor Zieliński	(Scotland); Jayson Shaw	(Austria); Mario He
2023	Austria	(United States); Shane Van Boening	10–7	(Bosnia and Herzegovina); Sanjin Pehlivanović	(Poland); Wojciech Szewczyk	(Austria); Max Lechner
2024	New Zealand	(Germany); Joshua Filler	10–8	(Chinese Taipei); Hsu Jui-an	(Netherlands); Marco Teutscher	(Chinese Taipei); Wu Kun-lin
2025	Indonesia	(Austria); Albin Ouschan	10–5	(Greece); Alex Kazakis	(Philippines); Bryant Saguiped	(Japan); Hayato Hijikata
2026	United States	(Singapore); Aloysius Yapp	10–4	(Spain); Francisco Sánchez Ruiz	(Austria); Albin Ouschan	(Poland); Wiktor Zieliński

== Top performers ==
Name	Nationality	Winner	Runner-up	Semi-final or better
Dennis Orcollo	Philippines	1	1	3
Ronato Alcano	Philippines	1	1	2
**Francisco Sánchez Ruiz**	Spain	1	1	2
**Albin Ouschan**	Austria	1	0	2
Chang Jung-lin	Chinese Taipei	1	0	1
Efren Reyes	Philippines	1	0	1
**Joshua Filler**	Germany	1	0	1
Karl Boyes	England	1	0	1
**Ralf Souquet**	Germany	1	0	1
**Shane Van Boening**	United States	1	0	1
Wu Jia-qing	China	1	0	1
**Aloysius Yapp**	Singapore	1	0	1

- Active participants are shown in **bold**.
- In the event of identical records, players are sorted in alphabetical order by first name.

=== Women's ===
Year	Host	Final			Semifinalists
Year	Host	Winner	Score	Runner-up	Semifinalists
2025	United States	**(Austria)**; **Jasmin Ouschan**	**9–8**	(Philippines); Chezka Centeno	(Belarus); Marharyta Fefilava	(Chinese Taipei); Chen Chia-hua
2026	United States	**(Philippines)**; **Chezka Centeno**	**9–6**	(United Kingdom); Kelly Fisher	(United States); Savannah Easton	(Chinese Taipei); Wei Tzu-chien
