= Nine-ball at the 2013 World Games – men's singles =

Nine-ball men's singles at the 2013 World Games
- Venue: Unidad Deportiva Alberto Galindo, Cali, Colombia
- Dates: 26–30 July 2013
- Competitors: 16 from 14 nations

Medalists
gold medal	(United Kingdom) Darren Appleton
silver medal	(Chinese Taipei) Chang Jung-lin
bronze medal	(Philippines) Dennis Orcollo

The men's singles nine-ball competition at the 2013 World Games took place from 26 to 30 July at the Unidad Deportiva Alberto Galindo in Cali, Colombia.

== Last 16 ==
Chang Jung-lin (Chinese Taipei)	11–2	(Colombia) Ivan Dario Lopez Avila
Albin Ouschan (Austria)	0–11	(United States) Johnny Archer
Liu Haitao (China)	11–7	(Spain) David Alcaide
Yukio Akakariyama (Japan)	11–7	(Australia) Robby Foldvari
Darren Appleton (United Kingdom)	11–9	(Egypt) Mohamed El-Assal
Jalal Yousef (Venezuela)	5–11	(United States) Brandon Shuff
Francisco Diaz-Piazarro (Spain)	3–11	(Sweden) Marcus Chamat
Dennis Orcollo (Philippines)	11–3	(Chile) Enrique Rojas

== Last 8 ==
Quarter-finals
(Chinese Taipei) Chang Jung-lin	11
(United States) Johnny Archer	8
(China) Liu Haitao	11
(Japan) Yukio Akakariyama	7
(United Kingdom) Darren Appleton	11
(United States) Brandon Shuff	6
(Sweden) Marcus Chamat	2
(Philippines) Dennis Orcollo	11

Semi-finals
(Chinese Taipei) Chang Jung-lin	11
(China) Liu Haitao	6
(United Kingdom) Darren Appleton	11
(Philippines) Dennis Orcollo	9

Gold medal match
(Chinese Taipei) Chang Jung-lin	10
(United Kingdom) Darren Appleton	11
Bronze medal match
(China) Liu Haitao	5
(Philippines) Dennis Orcollo	11
