= Yukio Akakariyama =

Japanese pool player

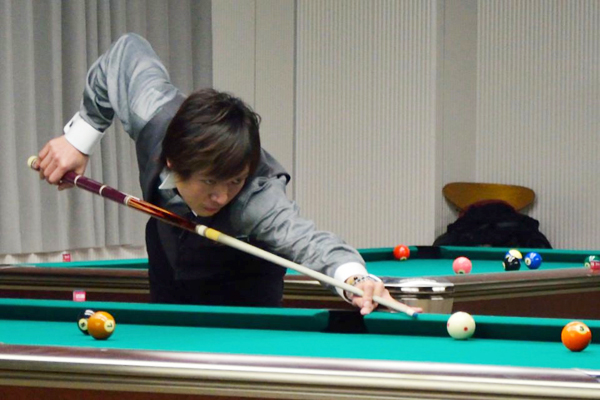

Personal information
- Born: 13 March 1975 (age 51) Osaka Prefecture, Japan
- Website: www.blog.livedoor.jp/yukio0313/

Pool career
- Country: Japan
- Pool games: 9-Ball

Tournament wins
- World Champion: 9-Ball (2011)
- Highest rank: 1

Yukio Akakariyama (Japanese 赤狩山 幸男, Akakariyama Yukio; born 13 March 1975 in Osaka, Japan) is a Japanese pool player. In 2011, Akakariyama won the WPA World Nine-ball Championship.

== Career ==
In November 2008, Akakariyama finished ninth at the Japan Open. In June 2009, he reached the semi-finals of the China Open. A month later, he made it to the final round of the 2009 WPA World Ten-ball Championship, in which he was defeated by the Taiwanese Chao Fong-Pang in the round of the last 64.

In February 2010, he reached with the round of 16 at the 2010 French Open his best result on the Euro Tour. In April 2010 he reached the round of 16 of the 2010 WPA World Eight-ball Championship, where he lost to Ruslan Tschinachow. At the 2010 WPA World Nine-ball Championship, he would lose in the last 64 once again.

At the 2011 WPA World Eight-ball Championship, Akakariyama retired in the round of 56. In May 2011, he reached the semifinals of the 2011 WPA World Ten-ball Championship, and would defeat eventual champion Huidji Lake in the double elimination round. At the 2011 WPA World Nine-ball Championship after wins against Karlo Dalmatin, Carlo Biado and Mark Gray he would proceed to the final. There he defeated the Philippians Ronato Alcano 13–11 and became 9-ball world champion.

In February 2012, Akakariyama reached the knockout round of the 8-Ball World Cup and lost there against Roberto Gomez. At the 2012 WPA World Nine-ball Championship he lost defending the championship in the semifinals against Thorsten Hohmann. At the 2013 World Games, he made it to the quarter-finals, where he was defeated by the Chinese Liu Haitao 7–11. After being eliminated in the preliminary round at the 9-Ball World Championships in 2013 and 2014, he reached the main knockout again in 2015 and where he lost in the last 32 against Ko Ping-chung.

== Titles ==
- 2019 Hokuriku 9-Ball Open
- 2016 All Japan 14.1 Championship
- 2013 Japan Premier Ten Ball League
- 2011 WPA World Nine-ball Championship
- 2010 Nara Excite 9-Ball Open
- 2009 Okayama 9-Ball Open
- 2002 China 9-Ball Open
