= Dominic Jentsch =

German pool player, born November 1991

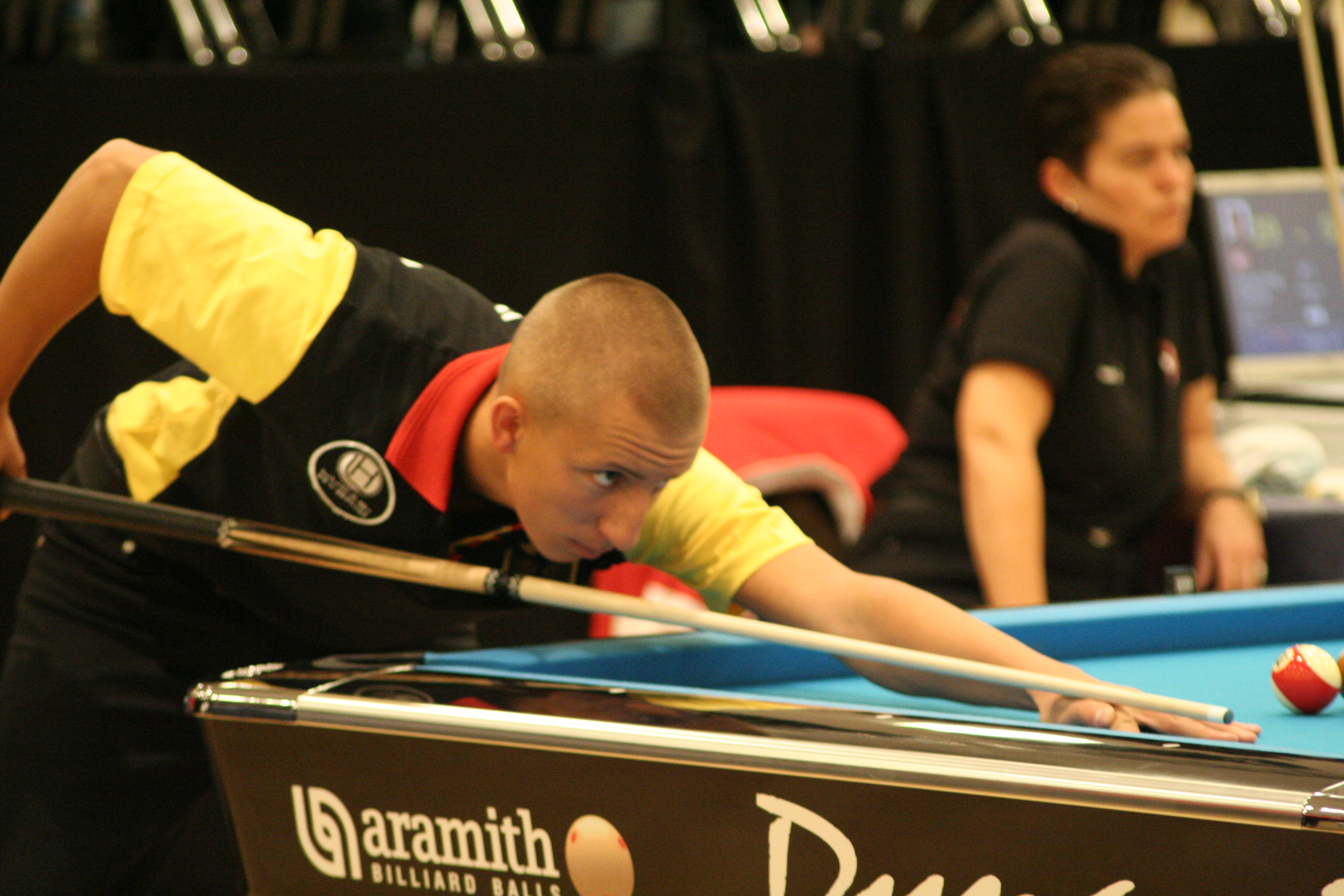

Personal information
- Born: 20 November 1991 (age 34)

Pool career
- Country: Germany

Dominic Jentsch (born 20 November 1991) is a German professional pool player. In 2006 he reached the final of the Under 17 European championships in 9-Ball. Two years later, he was again runner-up at the 2008 European championships, this time in the age group this time for straight pool, for under 19s.

Jentsch's biggest success so far was reaching the last 16 at the World Straight Pool Championship in 2008 before losing 38–200 against Nick van den Berg. He won his first Euro Tour event at the 2012 Treviso Open.

Jentsch is a three-time German champion, winning the 8-ball national championship in 2009 and 2012, and 9-ball in 2010. At the 2011 European Pool Championships, Jentsch won his first European championship in 8-ball, through a final victory over Ralf Souquet. The following season, at the 2012 European Pool Championships he won the event for a second time, winning the 10-Ball event through an 8–5 win over Stephan Cohen.

== Titles ==
- 2011 European Pool Championship 8-Ball
- 2012 European Pool Championship 10-Ball
- 2012 Euro Tour Italy Open
