= Jalal Yousef =

Venezuelan pool player (1979–2021)

Personal information
- Born: 21 October 1979
- Died: 12 April 2021 (aged 41)

Pool career
- Country: United Arab Emirates
- Turned pro: 2009
- Pool games: 9-Ball
- Best finish: Quarter finals 2017 WPA World Nine-ball Championship

Jalal Yousef Sulaimann (21 October 1979 – 12 April 2021) was a Venezuelan professional pool player, specifically nine-ball.

== Career ==
Salaimann was primarily a nine-ball player, having competed at the WPA World Nine-ball Championships since 2013. His best result, however, was reaching the last 16 of the 2012 WPA World Eight-ball Championship. Jalal also competed at the 2013 World Games; losing in the last 16. Before his time in 9-ball, Yousef competed in the WPA World Ten-ball Championship in 2010 and 2011.

On 12 April 2021, he died of COVID-19.
