= Jason Klatt =

Canadian professional pool player (born 1986)

Personal information
- Born: 18 April 1986 (age 40)

Pool career
- Country: Canada
- Pool games: 8-Ball, 9-Ball, 10-Ball

Jason Klatt (Born 18. April 1986) is a Canadian professional pool player. Klatt has represented Canada at three straight World Cup of Pool events, between 2009 and 2011. Klatt's best performance at a world championship came at the 2014 WPA World Nine-ball Championship, where he reached the last 32, before losing to Carlo Biado 11–5.

== Achievements ==
- 2018 Canadian 8-Ball Championship
- 2017 Canadian 10-Ball Championship
- 2017 Molson Cup Canadian Bar Table Championship
- 2016 Canadian 8-Ball Championship
- 2014 Canadian 9-Ball Championship
- 2013 Canadian 8-Ball Championship
- 2013 CSI US Bar Table 8-Ball Championship
- 2012 New York City 9-Ball Championship
- 2011 Canadian 10-Ball Championship
- 2010 Canadian 8-Ball Championship
- 2008 Pennsylvania State 9-Ball Championship
- 2008 Canadian Tour Season Finale
- 2008 Canadian 9-Ball Tour
- 2006 Canadian 8-Ball Championship
