= Ronato Alcano =

Filipino pool player

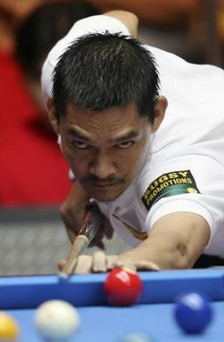
- Ronato Alcano in the 2006 World Pool Championship at the Philippine International Convention Center

Personal information
- Nicknames: "Ronnie Calamba", "the Volcano"
- Born: July 27, 1972 (age 53) Calamba, Laguna, Philippines

Pool career
- Country: Philippines
- Pool games: Eight-ball, nine-ball, ten-ball, rotation

Tournament wins
- World Champion: Eight-ball (2007), Nine-ball (2006)
Medal record
Representing Philippines
Men's Eight-Ball
Southeast Asian Games
Gold medal – first place	2007 Nakhon Ratchasima	Singles
Gold medal – first place	2009 Vientiane	Singles
Men's Rotation
Southeast Asian Games
Gold medal – first place	2005 Manila	Singles
Gold medal – first place	2005 Manila	Doubles

Ronato (Ronnie) Alcano OL (pronounced al-kah-no) (born July 27, 1972), is a Filipino professional pool player, nicknamed "Ronnie Calamba" and "the Volcano". He won both the 2006 WPA World Nine-ball Championship and the 2007 WPA World Eight-ball Championship.

== Career history ==
After graduating in elementary school, Alcano didn't proceed to high school due to financial problems. He then opted to play pool for a living.

Alcano's recognitions in the Philippines began with his performances at the 2000 Rising Stars Tournament. By the final, he was highly favored to win the title, yet in the final match (a race to 13), Alcano lost to Edgar Acaba by just a rack short, 13–12. Despite having a 12–7 advantage, Alcano missed while only three balls away. Acaba then returned to the table and won the needed 6 racks in a row to win the match and the title.

In 2002, Alcano began to make a name for himself, and began competing in major events in the US. He won five tournaments in the Joss Tour and was awarded Rookie of the Year for 2002 by azbilliards.com.

Alcano returned to the East, for the 2005 WPA Asian Nine-ball Tour, winning the Manila tournament (11-6 versus Yang Ching-shun), and qualifying for the world championship.

Coming in as an underdog, Alcano upset German Ralf Souquet in the finals, 17 to 11 at the 2006 WPA Men's World Nine-ball Championship. ESPN commentator Gerry Forsyth said, "the only way to stop Alcano is to put a rattlesnake in his pocket, then ask him for a match" about Alcano's performance. He thus became the third Filipino to become World Champion, after Efren Reyes and Alex Pagulayan. In the November 2006 tournament, Alcano had been on the brink of elimination in group play before taking advantage of a soft break. He won just 1 of 3 group matches and scraped through as the 64th and final seed. Alcano then defeated local favorite Reyes and defending champion Wu Jia-qing in the knockout stages, proceeding to the final. For winning the tournament, Alcano won US$100,000 which is the largest first prize ever won in the world nine-ball championship.

In 2007, Alcano won the WPA World Eight-ball Championship by defeating his compatriot Dennis Orcollo in the final match 11–8.

On September 16, 2007, Alcano finished second to Antonio Gabica in the Philippine Nine-ball Open.

In an attempt to defend his title at the 2007 World Nine-ball Championship, Alcano was bested in the last 64 by Daryl Peach of the United Kingdom who ultimately won the title.

On December 11, 2007, Ronato Alcano won the Philippines' 31st gold medal in the 24th Southeast Asian Games Men's 8-Ball Pool Singles at the Sima Thani Hotel Grand Ballroom.

On April 25, 2008, Ronnie Alcano lost his title at the World 8-Ball Championships in Fujairah City, United Arab Emirates. Germany's Ralf Souquet won the $60,000 championship prize, 13–9 final score.

On October 26, 2008, Alcano lost to Mika Immonen in the $250,000 33rd US Open Nine-ball Championship, where 237 billiards players competed in Chesapeake, Virginia. Mika claimed the 13–7 victory against Alcano, who settled for $20,000.

== Nicknames and monikers ==
During his early days of competing in the Philippines, Alcano was nicknamed "Calamba" which is a reference to his hometown in the country (see above). But when he started participating in US-based tournaments, some commentators mispronounced his last name as al-kay-no. Thus, the nickname "Volcano" was addressed.

== Title and achievements ==
- 2025 Python Nine-ball Invitational
- 2012 Championship Cloth Pro Classic Nine-ball
- 2012 Chuck Markulis Memorial Nine-ball
- 2010 Star Billiards Ten-ball Championship
- 2010 Pattaya Nine-ball Invitational
- 2009 Galveston Classic Eight-ball
- 2009 Southeast Asian Games Eight-ball Singles
- 2007 Southeast Asian Games Eight-ball Singles
- 2007 San Miguel Beer World Nine-ball Challenge
- 2007 WPA World Eight-ball Championship
- 2006 Philippine Sportsman of the Year
- 2006 WPA World Nine-ball Championship
- 2006 Blaze Tour
- 2005 San Miguel Asian Nine-ball Tour (Manila leg)
- 2005 Southeast Asian Games Rotation Doubles
- 2005 Southeast Asian Games Rotation Singles
- 2002 Joss Tour
