= Wu Jia-qing =

Taiwanese-born Chinese pool player

Wu Jiaqing
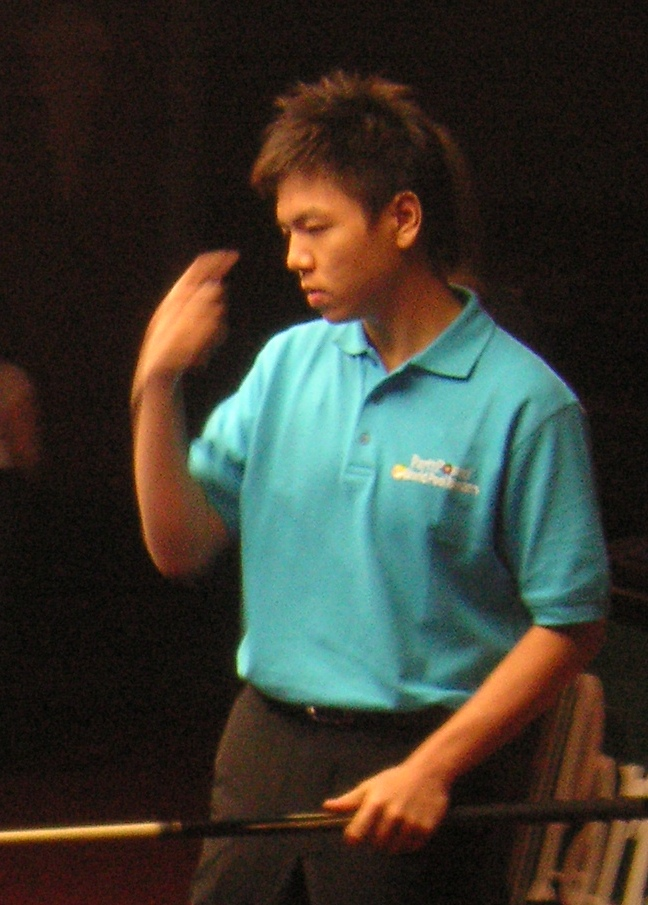
- Wu Chia-ching at the 2007 World Pool Trickshot Masters

Personal information
- Nickname: "Little Genius"
- Born: 9 February 1989 (age 37) Taishan

Pool career
- Country: China
- Pool games: 9-Ball

Tournament wins
- World Champion: 9-Ball (2005), 8-Ball (2005)
- Highest rank: 14

Wu Jiaqing (simplified Chinese: 吴珈庆; traditional Chinese: 吳珈慶; pinyin: Wú Jiāqìng; born 9 February 1989) is a Taiwanese-born Chinese professional pool player. He is nicknamed the Taishan Shentong ("Little Genius from Taishan"). Since 2011, Wu switched from representing Chinese Taipei to representing the People's Republic of China. Previously known as Wu Chia-ching, the spelling of his name was changed upon moving to mainland China.

== Career ==
Raised by his grandmother from the age of 2, Wu began playing eight-ball at the age of 10 at his family-run pool hall. When he became serious about pool, his grandmother would shuttle him from one competition venue to another on her scooter.

In 2005, after only six years of playing, Wu became the youngest men's player ever to win the WPA World Nine-ball Championship at 16 years old. The next year, he was the top seed of the event, but lost in the quarter-final round to eventual winner Ronato Alcano of the Philippines.

Wu also won the 2005 WPA World Eight-ball Championship. Previously, he was the runner-up at the 2004 Juniors Nine-ball World Championship.

He placed second to Darren Appleton in the inaugural WPA World Ten-ball Championship in 2008, claiming the runner-up prize of US$40,000 In the semi-finals of the event, Wu had defeated Demosthenes Pulpul of the Philippines, 11–8, using a borrowed cue stick.

In 2011 Wu applied for and obtained the household registration of Mainland China. Ostensibly, Wu did this, to allow himself to compete in more international events. Wu stated the decision was made for sporting reasons and should not be regarded in a political light. As of April 2011, Wu has not given up his Republic of China nationality. Republic of China Deputy Minister of the Interior Lin Tzu-ling stated that "An ROC national who wants to give up his or her citizenship must go through certain procedures. So far, I do not think we have received any application from him (Wu) to do so". The Minister noted that “As long as he is still an ROC national, he will be drafted into the military if he comes back to Taiwan.” The Republic of China's Act Governing Relations between the People of the Taiwan Area and the Mainland Area stipulates that both the “Taiwan Area” and the “Mainland Area” are parts of the ROC, and the “Mainland Area” is legally defined as “ROC territory outside of the Taiwan Area.” In addition, the law does not recognize PRC citizenship and defines PRC citizens as “people of the Mainland Area” who “have household registration in the Mainland Area.” Article 9-1 of the same law prohibits “the people of the Taiwan Area” from obtaining household registration in “the Mainland Area,” those who break the law are banned from voting and serving in office, while their household registration in “the Taiwan Area” is annulled.

== Career achievements ==
- 2026 Beijing Top Duya Golden Nine-ball Open
- 2021 Chinese Pool Elite Tour Event 3
- 2019 China Open 9-Ball Championship
- 2018 World Cup of Pool - with (Liu Haitao)
- 2016 China Open 9-Ball Championship
- 2015 CBSA Hongze 9-Ball Open
- 2008 Quezon City Invasion
- 2007 All Japan Championship 9-Ball
- 2006 Mezz Crowd Nine Cup Doubles
- 2005 Billiards Digest Players of the Year
- 2005 WPA World Eight-ball Championship
- 2005 Mezz Crowd Nine Cup
- 2005 WPA World Nine-ball Championship
