= Chang Jung-lin =

Taiwanese pool player (1985–2025)

Chang Jung-lin 張榮麟
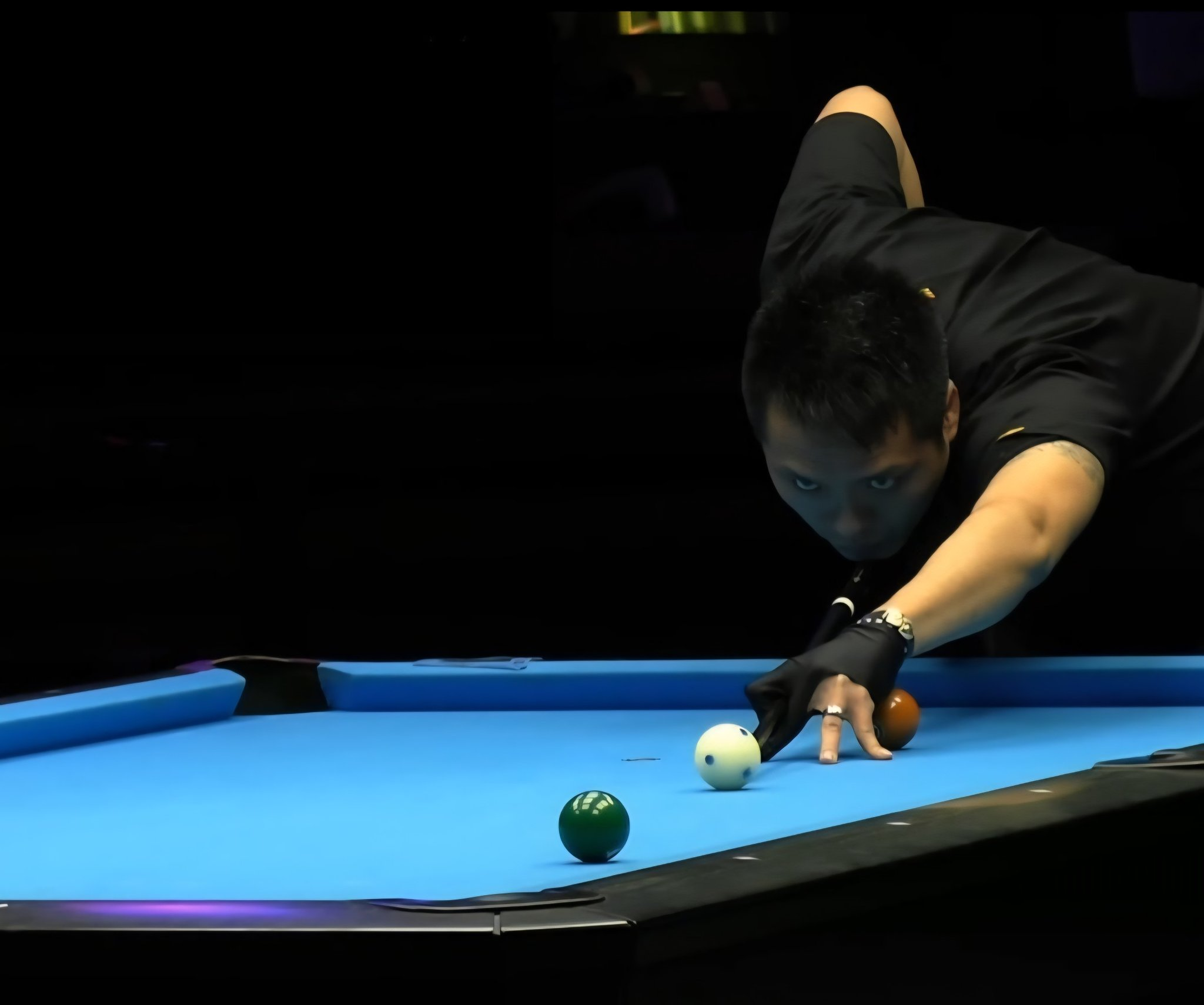
- Chang competing in 2023

Personal information
- Born: May 2, 1985 Alian Township, Gangshan District, Kaohsiung County, Taiwan
- Died: July 14, 2025 (aged 40) Jakarta, Indonesia

Pool career
- Country: Chinese Taipei
- Pool games: Eight-ball, nine-ball, ten-ball

Tournament wins
- World Champion: Eight-ball (2012)
- Highest rank: 1
Medal record
Men's Eight-Ball
Representing Chinese Taipei
2013 World Games
Silver medal – second place	2013 Cali	Singles

Chang Jung-lin (Chinese: 張榮麟; May 2, 1985 – July 14, 2025) was a Taiwanese professional eight-ball, nine-ball and ten-ball pool player.

Chang became WPA World Eight-ball Champion in 2012 and won the silver medal at the 2013 World Games for Nine-ball. Chang was a world number 1, having done so first after winning WPA World Eight-ball Championship in 2012.

== Career ==
At the 2012 WPA World Eight-ball Championship, Chang defeated compatriot Fu Che-wei in the final 11–6, after previously winning his semi-final 9–7 against Chris Melling.

In 2013, Chang competed in the 2013 World Games, reaching the final of the Men's Nine-Ball championships, where he would become runner-up to England's Darren Appleton, with the score ending 10–11.

In 2019, Chang lost to Fedor Gorst 11–13, finished second in the World Pool Championship.

Other notable titles in Chang's short career included the 2018 International 9-Ball Open, beating countryman Ko Ping Chung in the finals, and a win at the 2019 Derby City Classic Bigfoot 10-Ball Challenge and the 2020 Diamond Las Vegas Open.

He began playing with Predator Cues in 2017.

== Personal life and death ==
Chang was born on May 2, 1985, in Alian Township, Kaohsiung County. He studied at Chinese Culture University and was married.

On July 14, 2025, Chang died aged 40 after an apparent stroke or heart attack while resting in his hotel room in Jakarta, Indonesia.

== Career titles and achievements ==
- 2025 CTPBA Pro Nine-ball Tour 3
- 2024 Asian Ten-ball Championship
- 2024 Formosa Cup ACBS Asian Pool Championship
- 2024 Predator Apex Mix Doubles - with (Chou Chieh-Yu)
- 2020 Diamond Las Vegas Open
- 2020 CPBA Champion of Champions
- 2019 Derby City Classic Bigfoot Ten-ball Challenge
- 2019 Mid-West Billiards & Cue Expo Ten-ball
- 2018 International 9-Ball Open
- 2017 Asian Indoor and Martial Arts Games Nine-ball Singles
- 2017 CBSA Liuzhou Nine-ball Open
- 2017 Japan Open Ten-ball
- 2013 Golden Break Nine-ball Open
- 2012 WPA World Eight-ball Championship
- 2012 All Japan Championship Ten-ball
- 2012 WPA World Team Championship
- 2011 Beijing Nine-ball Open
- 2011 Japan Open Ten-ball
- 2008 Guinness Asian Nine-ball Tour (Malaysia)
- 2008 Guinness Asian Nine-ball Tour (Republic of China Leg)
- 2008 Guinness Asian Nine-ball Tour (Malaysia)
- 2007 Guinness Asian Nine-ball Tour (Indonesia Leg)
- 2007 Guinness Asian Nine-ball Tour (Malaysia Leg)
- 2007 Guinness Asian Nine-ball Tour (Indonesia Leg)
