= Hayato Hijikata =

Hayato Hijikata (Japanese: 土方 隼斗, born March 16, 1989) is a professional pocket billiards player affiliated with the Japan Professional Pocket Billiards Association (40th class). He is a certified professional of the Japan Billi-Ball Association and is affiliated with MEZZ CUES and Dream Shot. He holds the official Japanese record for consecutive "break and runs" (clearing the table from the break) in a match (eight consecutive racks). He was ranked number one in Japan in 2013 and 2016.

His best world ranking was 19th in 2014.
