= Konstantin Stepanov =

Russian pool player

Personal information
- Born: 26 September 1983 (age 42) Moscow

Pool career
- Country: Russia
- Pool games: 9-ball

Konstantin Stepanov (born 26 September 1983) (Russian: Константин Степанов) is a Russian professional pool player. In 2002 he was the Russian 8-ball champion. During the 2006 WPA Men's World Nine-ball Championship he survived the group stages, the round of 64 and the round of 32, but was eliminated in the round of 16 by Ralf Souquet. This performance secured him a spot in the 2007 edition of the event. He was a banner member of the Russian World Team Pool Cup in 2010.

== Titles & Achievements ==
- 2020 Russian Pool Championship Straight pool
- 2017 Russian Pool Championship Nine-ball
- 2016 Russian Pool Championship Ten-ball
- 2016 Russian Pool Championship Straight pool
- 2015 Russian Pool Championship Ten-ball
- 2015 Russian Pool Championship Nine-ball
- 2014 Russian Pool Championship Straight pool
- 2013 Euro Tour Italy Open
- 2013 North Cyprus Open
- 2012 Russian Pool Championship Nine-ball
- 2011 Russian Pool Championship Straight pool
- 2011 Russian Pool Championship Nine-ball
- 2010 European Pool Championship Eight-ball
- 2009 Russian Pool Championship Straight pool
- 2009 Russian Pool Championship Eight-ball
- 2008 Russian Pool Championship Nine-ball
- 2008 Russian Pool Championship Straight pool
- 2007 Mosconi Cup
- 2007 Russian Pool Championship Nine-ball
