= Liu Haitao (pool player) =

Chinese pool player

Personal information
- Born: 12 August 1982 (age 43)

Pool career
- Country: China
- Pool games: 9-Ball, 8-Ball
Medal record
Men's Nine-ball
Representing China
Asian Indoor and Martial Arts Games
Gold medal – first place	2017 Ashgabat	Scotch doubles

Liu Haitao (born August 12, 1982 ) is a Chinese professional pool player. Haitao reached the semi-final of the 2012 WPA World Eight-ball Championship, and the 2013 World Games. Haitao won the doubles event at the 2017 Asian Indoor Games; alongside snooker player Lyu Haotian.

== Titles & Achievements ==
- 2019 Chinese Pool World Masters
- 2018 World Cup of Pool - with (Wu Jia-qing)
- 2017 Asian Indoor and Martial Arts Games 9-Ball Doubles
- 2014 WPA World Team Championship
