= 2004 WPA World Nine-ball Championship =

WPA World 9-Ball Championship 2004
Tournament information
- Sport: 9-ball
- Location: Taipei, Taiwan
- Dates: July 10, 2004–July 18, 2004
- Tournament format: Round robin / Single Elimination
- Host: WPA World Nine-ball Championship
- Participants: 128

Final positions
- Champion: (Canada) Alex Pagulayan
- Runner-up: (Chinese Taipei) Chang Pei-Wei

The 2004 WPA World Nine-ball Championship was the 15th edition of the WPA World Championship for 9-Ball Pool. It took place from July 10 to 18, 2004 in the Taiwanese capital city Taipei.

Filipino-Canadian Alex Pagulayan won the championship with a 17–13 victory in the final against Taiwanese Chang Pei-Wei . Defending champion Thorsten Hohmann dropped out in the round of 32 against Kang Chin-ching from Chinese Taipei.

== Format ==
The 128 participating players were divided into 16 groups, in which they competed in round robin mode against each other. The top four players in each group qualified for the final round played in the knockout system, featuring the remaining 64 players.

== Group stage ==
The following players exited the competition in the group stage:

	5. Place	6. Place	7. Place	8. Place
Group 1:	(Switzerland) Marco Tschudi	(Puerto Rico) Alan Rolon	(United States) Tim Hall	(Costa Rica) Giovanni Orozco
Group 2:	(India) Alok Kumar	(Finland) Markus Juva	(Japan) Shintaro Sugaya	(United States) Corey Harper
Group 3:	(Poland) Radosław Babica	(Mexico) Ismael Páez	(Italy) Vittorio De Falco	(Australia) David Reljic
Group 4:	(England) Daryl Peach	(Germany) Michael Schmidt	(Japan) Kazuo Furuta	(Argentina) Gustavo Espinosa
Group 5:	(South Africa) Yulan Govender	(South Korea) Ryu Seung-woo	(United Arab Emirates) Hanni al-Howri	(Canada) Al Logan
Group 6:	(England) James Kay	(Australia) Emile Riera	(Canada) Cliff Thorburn	(England) Anthony Ginn
Group 7:	(Germany) Thomas Engert	(Slovenia) Marco Bacarcic	(New Zealand) Phil Wilkinson	(United States) Steve Lillis
Group 8:	(Chinese Taipei) Hsu Chun-yang	(Republic of Ireland) Tommy Donlon	(Malaysia) Ibrahim Bin Amir	(Aruba) Richard Wolff
Group 9:	(Hungary) Vilmos Földes	(Malaysia) Alan Tan	(United States) Mike Davis	(Indonesia) Kamarudin Yudharman
Group 10:	(Japan) Hiroshi Takenaka	(New Zealand) Jimmy Henry	(Finland) Stefan Selberg	(England) Kevin Hew
Group 11:	(Japan) Akikumo Toshikawa	(Luxembourg) Marc Holtz	(England) Raj Hundal	(Indonesia) Siauw Wieto
Group 12:	(England) Kevin Smith	(Thailand) Chachawal Rutphae	(Canada) Chris Orme	(South Africa) David Anderson
Group 13:	(Netherlands) Niels Feijen	(South Korea) Park Shin-young	(New Zealand) Matthew McInnes	(Spain) Gabriel Carral
Group 14:	(Croatia) Ivica Putnik	(United States) Max Eberle	(Chinese Taipei) Chien Ming-wei	(South Korea) Lee Jang-su
Group 15:	(South Korea) Jeong Young-hwa	(Japan) Kunihiko Takahashi	(Australia) Phil Reilly	(Germany) Sascha Trautmann
Group 16:	(Philippines) Jose Parica	(Denmark) Kasper Kristoffersen	(United States) Jeremy Jones	(Thailand) Surathep Phoochalam

== Final round ==
Round of 64 (Race to 9)
(Chinese Taipei) Chao Fong-pang	9
(Scotland) Michael Valentine	2
(Malaysia) Patrick Ooi	9
(Argentina) Jorge Llanos	2
(England) Imran Majid	9
(Scotland) Pat Holtz	0
(Japan) Satoshi Kawabata	9
(Philippines) Antonio Gabica	4
(Chinese Taipei) Huang Chien-che	9
(Sweden) Erik Weiselius	2
(Netherlands) Rico Diks	9
(Japan) Takeshi Okumura	2
(Canada) Alex Pagulayan	9
(Serbia and Montenegro) Andreja Klasovic	8
(Austria) Martin Kempter	9
(Finland) Marko Lohtander	7
(Chinese Taipei) Kang Chin-ching	9
(Chinese Taipei) Wang Hung-hsiang	6
(Germany) Thorsten Hohmann	9
(Netherlands) Nick van den Berg	3
(Philippines) Rodolfo Luat	9
(England) Steve Davis	7
(Chinese Taipei) Hsia Hui-kai	9
(United States) Charlie Williams	5
(Chinese Taipei) Kuo Po-cheng	9
(Peru) John Lopez	4
(Spain) David Alcaide	9
(Malta) Tony Drago	8
(United States) Earl Strickland	9
(Germany) Thomas Hasch	4
(Chinese Taipei) Fu Che-wei	9
(Sweden) Tom Storm	8
(Sweden) Marcus Chamat	9
(Germany) Ralf Souquet	6
(Philippines) Ramil Gallego	9
(Chinese Taipei) Chen Ying-chieh	7
(Germany) Thorsten Schober	9
(Philippines) Lee Vann Corteza	7
(United States) Rodney Morris	9
(United States) Tony Crosby	4
(Philippines) Marlon Manalo	9
(Chinese Taipei) Yang Ching-shun	7
(Philippines) Francisco Bustamante	9
(United States) Danny Basavich	2
(Philippines) Efren Reyes	9
(Netherlands) Alex Lely	6
(Germany) Oliver Ortmann	9
(England) Kevin Uzzell	2
(Philippines) Dennis Orcollo	9
(United States) Danny Harriman	2
(Russia) Konstantin Stepanov	9
(Chinese Taipei) Wu Jia-qing	6
(Chinese Taipei) Chang Pei-Wei	9
(Philippines) Warren Kiamco	7
(Norway) Raymond Hauge	9
(Mexico) Ernesto Domínguez	6
(United States) Johnny Archer	9
(Japan) Hisashi Yamamoto	5
(Canada) Luc Salvas	9
(Philippines) Gandy Valle	8
(Sweden) Niklas Bergendorff	9
(Italy) Fabio Petroni	2
(Finland) Mika Immonen	9
(Philippines) Antonio Lining	4

Round of 32 (Race to 9)
(Chinese Taipei) Chao Fong-pang	9
(Malaysia) Patrick Ooi	5
(England) Imran Majid	9
(Japan) Satoshi Kawabata	6
(Chinese Taipei) Huang Chien-che	9
(Netherlands) Rico Diks	4
(Canada) Alex Pagulayan	9
(Austria) Martin Kempter	5
(Chinese Taipei) Kang Chin-ching	9
(Germany) Thorsten Hohmann	1
(Philippines) Rodolfo Luat	9
(Chinese Taipei) Hsia Hui-kai	2
(Chinese Taipei) Kuo Po-cheng	9
(Spain) David Alcaide	8
(United States) Earl Strickland	9
(Chinese Taipei) Fu Che-wei	7
(Sweden) Marcus Chamat	9
(Philippines) Ramil Gallego	6
(Germany) Thorsten Schober	9
(United States) Rodney Morris	6
(Philippines) Marlon Manalo	9
(Philippines) Francisco Bustamante	5
(Philippines) Efren Reyes	9
(Germany) Oliver Ortmann	6
(Philippines) Dennis Orcollo	9
(Russia) Konstantin Stepanov	5
(Chinese Taipei) Chang Pei-Wei	9
(Norway) Raymond Hauge	6
(United States) Johnny Archer	9
(Canada) Luc Salvas	6
(Sweden) Niklas Bergendorff	9
(Finland) Mika Immonen	7

Round of 16 (Race to 11)
(Chinese Taipei) Chao Fong-pang	11
(England) Imran Majid	1
(Chinese Taipei) Huang Chien-che	7
(Canada) Alex Pagulayan	11
(Chinese Taipei) Kang Chin-ching	11
(Philippines) Rodolfo Luat	7
(Chinese Taipei) Kuo Po-cheng	11
(United States) Earl Strickland	8
(Sweden) Marcus Chamat	11
(Germany) Thorsten Schober	8
(Philippines) Marlon Manalo	11
(Philippines) Efren Reyes	4
(Philippines) Dennis Orcollo	5
(Chinese Taipei) Chang Pei-Wei	11
(United States) Johnny Archer	11
(Sweden) Niklas Bergendorff	9

Quarter-Final (Race to 11)
(Chinese Taipei) Chao Fong-pang	10
(Canada) Alex Pagulayan	11
(Chinese Taipei) Kang Chin-ching	10
(Chinese Taipei) Kuo Po-cheng	11
(Sweden) Marcus Chamat	11
(Philippines) Marlon Manalo	6
(Chinese Taipei) Chang Pei-Wei	11
(United States) Johnny Archer	10

Semi-Final (Race to 11)
(Canada) Alex Pagulayan	11
(Chinese Taipei) Kuo Po-cheng	4
(Sweden) Marcus Chamat	9
(Chinese Taipei) Chang Pei-Wei	11

Finale (Race to 17)
(Canada) Alex Pagulayan	17
(Chinese Taipei) Chang Pei-Wei	13

== See also ==
- List of sporting events in Taiwan
- List of WPA World Nine-ball champions
