= 2003 WPA World Nine-ball Championship =

WPA World 9-Ball Championship 2003
Tournament information
- Sport: 9-ball
- Location: Cardiff, Wales
- Dates: July 12, 2003–July 20, 2003
- Tournament format: Round robin / Single Elimination
- Host(s): WPA World Nine-ball Championship, Matchroom Pool
- Participants: 128

Final positions
- Champion: (Germany) Thorsten Hohmann
- Runner-up: (Canada) Alex Pagulayan

The 2003 WPA World Nine-ball Championship was the 14th edition of the WPA World Championship for 9-Ball Pool. It took place from July 12 to 20, 2003 in Cardiff, Wales.

Thorsten Hohmann won the event 17–10 victory in the final against Canadian Alex Pagulayan. Defending champion Earl Strickland was eliminated in the semi-final against Hohmann.

== Tournament format ==
The event featured 128 participating players which were divided into 16 groups, in which they competed in round robin mode against each other. The top four players in each group qualified for a knockout round from the stage of the last 64.

=== Controversy ===
The event saw reigning champion Earl Strickland play 6-time world Snooker champion Steve Davis in the last 16. Before the match, held in Cardiff, during a press conference, Strickland commented that he knew that the fans were being disrespectful towards him, and favouring Davis. During the match, Strickland referred to a crowd member as an "asshole", and began to talk during Davis' shots, against the rules. Referee Michaela Tabb warned Strickland, to which he replied that Tabb should "shut up". Davis would use his entitled comfort break shortly before the next frame, despite already being down on the shot to break. Davis would later suggest this was used as gamesmanship.

During the break, Strickland put his fingers in his ears to block out the crowd's support for Davis. With the match at 10 racks to 9, in favour of Strickland, he missed a long 6 ball. Using the rest, Davis would miss an "easy" shot (according to Strickland), from where Strickland would leap out of his seat, and exclaim that Davis had "dogged it." Strickland's tirade against Davis, the crowd, and the rules of the event, continued through the main part of a post-match interview, before visibly calming and apologizing for his behaviour. After admitting regret over his reactions during the encounter with Davis, Strickland entered the arena for his next match carrying a bunch of flowers which he gave to Tabb by way of an apology, and proceeded to play in a much calmer manner for the remainder of the event.

Strickland had also played the 2003 World Snooker champion Mark Williams in the preliminaries of the competition, winning 5–3.

== Preliminary round ==
The following players were knocked out of the competition in the preliminary round, finishing 5th or lower in the round robin.

	5. Place	6. Place	7. Place	8. Place
Group 1:	(Canada) Paul Potier	(Finland) Mark Lohtander	(Hungary) Vilmos Földes	(South Africa) Anton Klanfar
Group 2:	(Chinese Taipei) Kuo Po-cheng	(Australia) Phil Reilly	(Croatia) Ivica Putnik	(United States) Shawn Putnam
Group 3:	(Indonesia) Siauw Wieto	(England) Imran Majid	(Australia) Emile Riera	(United States) Art Wiggins
Group 4:	(Poland) Radosław Babica	(Finland) Janne Kaipainen	(Austria) Alexander Markut	(Philippines) Ronato Alcano
Group 5:	(Wales) Rob McKenna	(Canada) Jeff Kennedy	(United States) Charlie Williams	(Puerto Rico) Alan Rolon
Group 6:	(England) Anthony Ginn	(Serbia and Montenegro) Šandor Tot	(Australia) David Reljic	(Netherlands) Anand Manurat
Group 7:	(Chinese Taipei) Chang Pei-Wei	(Czech Republic) Roman Hybler	(Canada) Andre Pelletier	(South Africa) David Anderson
Gruppe 8:	(Chinese Taipei) Chao Fong-Pang	(England) Kevin Uzzell	(Denmark) Peter Nielsen	(Sweden) Erik Weiselius
Group 9:	(Germany) Christian Reimering	(Singapore) William Ang Boon Lay	(Russia) Konstantin Stepanow	(Aruba) Richard Wolff
Group 10:	(Greece) John Papadopoulos	(Singapore) Bernard Tey Choon Kiat	(Greece) Athanasios Vrakas	(Mexico) Mauro Ibarra
Group 11:	(France) Stephan Cohen	(Netherlands) Gilliano Smit	(Aruba) Ditto Acosta	(New Zealand) Ceri Worts
Group 12:	(New Zealand) Brent Wells	(Norway) Raymond Hauge	(England) Dominic Clemens	(United States) Bill Ferguson
Group 13:	(United States) Jimmy Wetch	(Spain) Juan Fernández	(Germany) Thorsten Schober	(United Arab Emirates) Hanni al-Howri
Group 14:	(Germany) Ralph Eckert	(England) Daryl Peach	(Aruba) Ryan Rampersaud	(Italy) Carmine Nanula
Group 15:	(Sweden) Tom Storm	(Germany) Michael Schmidt	(Switzerland) Sascha Specchia	(Scotland) Michael Valentine
Group 16:	(United States) Nick Varner	(Australia) Robert Elsley	(Puerto Rico) Jason Cruz	(South Korea) Jong Hong-jo

== Final round ==
Those that qualified, would play in a knockout round.

Round of 64 (Race to 9)
(Malta) Tony Drago	9
(Greece) Evangelos Vettas	4
(United States) Danny Harriman	9
(Chinese Taipei) Chen Ying-chieh	6
(South Korea) Jeong Young-hwa	9
(Singapore) Tiong Boon Tan	3
(Philippines) Marlon Manalo	9
(Mexico) Ernesto Domínguez	4
(South Korea) Lee Jang-su	9
(United States) Corey Deuel	2
(Sweden) Marcus Chamat	9
(Belgium) Pascal Budo	7
(United States) Max Eberle	9
(Philippines) Dennis Orcollo	8
(Chinese Taipei) Hsia Hui-kai	9
(Wales) Mark Williams	0
(Canada) Alex Pagulayan	9
(Japan) Shintaro Sugaya	5
(United States) Rodney Morris	9
(Italy) Fabio Petroni	8
(Chinese Taipei) Lee Kun-fang	9
(Japan) Hiroshi Takenaka	6
(Philippines) Ramil Gallego	9
(Russia) Evgeny Stalev	4
(Netherlands) Niels Feijen	9
(Scotland) Geoff Dunn	4
(South Korea) Park Shin-young	9
(England) Chris Melling	6
(Netherlands) Alex Lely	9
(Japan) Satoshi Kawabata	8
(Chinese Taipei) Fu Che-wei	9
(Argentina) Jorge Llanos	7
(United States) Earl Strickland	9
(Germany) Thomas Engert	3
(Japan) Haruyoshi Hinokiyama	9
(Philippines) Antonio Lining	8
(England) Steve Davis	9
(India) Mukesh Rehani	3
(Japan) Kunihiko Takahashi	9
(England) Roxton Chapman	4
(Germany) Ralf Souquet	9
(Canada) Raymond Cruz	6
(Chinese Taipei) Yang Ching-shun	9
(Japan) Akikumo Toshikawa	4
(Finland) Mika Immonen	9
(England) Steve Knight	3
(Sweden) Niklas Bergendorff	9
(Chinese Taipei) Lu Hui-chan	1
(Philippines) Francisco Bustamante	9
(Germany) Oliver Ortmann	2
(Philippines) Lee Vann Corteza	9
(Sweden) Sten Jarledal	2
(Philippines) Efren Reyes	9
(United States) Johnny Archer	5
(Netherlands) Nick van den Berg	9
(England) Kevin Smith	0
(Germany) Thorsten Hohmann	9
(Canada) John Horsfall	6
(United States) Teddy Garraham	9
(Netherlands) Rico Diks	8
(Canada) Luc Salvas	9
(Republic of Ireland) Tommy Donlon	8
(Luxembourg) Marc Holtz	9
(Philippines) Warren Kiamco	3

Round of 32 (Race to 9)
(Malta) Tony Drago	9
(United States) Danny Harriman	4
(South Korea) Jeong Young-hwa	9
(Philippines) Marlon Manalo	2
(South Korea) Lee Jang-su	3
(Sweden) Marcus Chamat	9
(United States) Max Eberle	8
(Chinese Taipei) Hsia Hui-kai	9
(Canada) Alex Pagulayan	9
(United States) Rodney Morris	8
(Chinese Taipei) Lee Kun-fang	6
(Philippines) Ramil Gallego	9
(Netherlands) Niels Feijen	1
(South Korea) Park Shin-young	9
(Netherlands) Alex Lely	9
(Chinese Taipei) Fu Che-wei	5
(United States) Earl Strickland	9
(Japan) H. Hinokiyama	3
(England) Steve Davis	9
(Japan) K. Takahashi	6
(Germany) Ralf Souquet	3
(Chinese Taipei) Yang Ching-shun	9
(Finland) Mika Immonen	9
(Sweden) N. Bergendorff	1
(Philippines) F. Bustamante	9
(Philippines) Lee Vann Corteza	3
(Philippines) Efren Reyes	9
(Netherlands) Nick van den Berg	8
(Germany) T. Hohmann	9
(United States) Teddy Garraham	3
(Canada) Luc Salvas	9
(Luxembourg) Marc Holtz	8

Round of 16 (Race to 11)
(Malta) Tony Drago	11
(South Korea) Jeong Young-hwa	9
(Sweden) Marcus Chamat	4
(Chinese Taipei) Hsia Hui-kai	11
(Canada) Alex Pagulayan	11
(Philippines) Ramil Gallego	4
(South Korea) Park Shin-young	11
(Netherlands) Alex Lely	5
(United States) Earl Strickland	11
(England) Steve Davis	9
(Chinese Taipei) Yang Ching-shun	11
(Finland) Mika Immonen	4
(Philippines) F. Bustamante	11
(Philippines) Efren Reyes	8
(Germany) T. Hohmann	11
(Canada) Luc Salvas	6

Quarter-Final (Race to 11)
(Malta) Tony Drago	11
(Chinese Taipei) Hsia Hui-kai	8
(Canada) Alex Pagulayan	11
(South Korea) Park Shin-young	9
(United States) Earl Strickland	11
(Chinese Taipei) Yang Ching-shun	9
(Philippines) F. Bustamante	10
(Germany) T. Hohmann	11

Semi-Final (Race to 11)
(Malta) Tony Drago	6
(Canada) Alex Pagulayan	11
(United States) Earl Strickland	4
(Germany) T. Hohmann	11

Final (Race to 17)
(Canada) Alex Pagulayan	10
(Germany) Thorsten Hohmann	17
