= 2005 WPA World Nine-ball Championship =

WPA World 9-Ball Championship 2005
Tournament information
- Sport: 9-ball
- Location: Kaohsiung, Taiwan
- Dates: July 2, 2005–July 10, 2005
- Tournament format: Round robin / Single Elimination
- Host: WPA World Nine-ball Championship
- Participants: 128

Final positions
- Champion: (Chinese Taipei) Wu Chia-ching
- Runner-up: (Chinese Taipei) Kuo Po-cheng

The 2005 WPA World Nine-ball Championship was the 16th edition of the WPA World Championship for 9-Ball Pool. It took place from July 2 to 10, 2005 in the Taiwanese city, Kaohsiung.

Taiwanese Wu Chia-ching won the championship with a 17–16 victory in the final against compatriot Kuo Po-cheng. Defending champion Alex Pagulayan was eliminated by Vilmos Földes in the round of 32.

== Format ==
The 128 participating players were divided into 16 groups, in which they competed in round robin mode against each other. The top four players in each group qualified for the final round played in the knockout system, featuring the remaining 64 players.

== Group stage ==
The following players exited the competition in the group stage:

	5. Place	6. Place	7. Place	8. Place
Group 1:	(Germany) Jakob Belka	(Netherlands) Rico Diks	(South Africa) Yulan Govender	(Chinese Taipei) Pan Shen-ping
Group 2:	(Australia) Phil Reilly	(Malaysia) Patrick Ooi	(England) Steve Higton	(Venezuela) Jerry Calderon
Group 3:	(England) Imran Majid	(India) Manan Chandra	(Greece) Lambros Vrakas	(United States) Charlie Williams
Group 4:	(Chinese Taipei) Kang Chin-ching	(Philippines) Efren Reyes	(Poland) Tomasz Kapłan	(Denmark) Jakob Lyng
Group 5:	(Poland) Radosław Babica	(Wales) Ben Davies	(Mexico) Ismael Páez	(Japan) Naoyuki Ōi
Group 6:	(Sweden) Erik Weiselius	(Philippines) Antonio Lining	(Hong Kong) Au Chi-wai	(Singapore) Steve Hock Chin
Group 7:	(South Korea) Kim Wong-dea	(Finland) Marko Lohtander	(Chinese Taipei) Zeng Ding-yuan	(Canada) Jeff White
Group 8:	(Spain) Samir Kaddur	(England) Craig Osborne	(Argentina) Gustavo Espinosa	(Malaysia) Alan Tan
Group 9:	(Belgium) Jan Dulst	(Singapore) Chan Keng Kwang	(Venezuela) José Luis Perez	(Pakistan) Irfan Ahmed Khan
Group 10:	(United States) John Schmidt	(New Zealand) Ceri Worts	(Spain) David Alcaide	(England) Anthony Ginn
Group 11:	(Chile) Enrique Rojas	(United Arab Emirates) Hanni al-Howri	(Austria) Cetin Aslan	(Australia) Louis Condo
Group 12:	(Italy) Fabio Petroni	(Germany) Thorsten Schober	(South Korea) Jeong Young-hwa	(Thailand) Washana Poonjaeng
Group 13:	(Norway) Roger Lysholm	(Canada) Erik Hjorleifson	(Indonesia) Siauw Wieto	(Hong Kong) Lee Chenman
Group 14:	(Serbia and Montenegro) Šandor Tot	(United States) Shawn Putnam	(Germany) Nicolas Ottermann	(Japan) Hiroshi Takenaka
Group 15:	(Serbia and Montenegro) Goran Mladenovic	(India) Dharminder Singh Lilly	(Australia) Stuart Lawler	(Sweden) David Larsson
Group 16:	(Netherlands) Gilliano Smit	(Germany) Ralf Souquet	(Singapore) Tiong Boon Tan	(New Zealand) Phil Wilkinson

== Final round ==
Round of 64 (Race to 9)
(Chinese Taipei) Kuo Po-cheng	10
(England) Steve Davis	7
(Chinese Taipei) Liu Chun-chiang	10
(England) Daryl Peach	7
(Czech Republic) Roman Hybler	10
(Chinese Taipei) Cheng Chong-hua	6
(Chinese Taipei) Chao Fong-Pang	10
(Scotland) Michael Valentine	2
(Chinese Taipei) Huang Kun-chang	10
(Germany) Thomas Engert	7
(Chinese Taipei) Hsia Hui-kai	10
(United States) Mike Davis	3
(Philippines) Rodolfo Luat	10
(Vietnam) Lương Chí Dũng	1
(Vietnam) Thanh Nam Nguyen	10
(Netherlands) Niels Feijen	8
(Chinese Taipei) Chang Jung-lin	10
(Philippines) Francisco Bustamante	8
(Philippines) Warren Kiamco	10
(Australia) David Reljic	6
(United States) Rodney Morris	10
(Canada) Luc Salvas	2
(England) Raj Hundal	10
(Chinese Taipei) Yang Ching-shun	4
(Hungary) Vilmos Földes	10
(Malaysia) Ibrahim Bin Amir	2
(Philippines) Alex Pagulayan	10
(South Korea) Park Shin-young	5
(Netherlands) Nick van den Berg	10
(Malta) Tony Drago	5
(Chinese Taipei) Wang Hua-fong	10
(Philippines) Dennis Orcollo	5
(Sweden) Marcus Chamat	10
(United States) Johnny Archer	5
(Canada) Alain Martel	10
(United States) Earl Strickland	7
(Chinese Taipei) Wu Jia-qing	10
(Chinese Taipei) Ko Pin-yi	5
(Germany) Andreas Roschkowsky	10
(Indonesia) Adam Abdulrahim	2
(England) Kevin Uzzell	10
(Netherlands) Alex Lely	7
(Germany) Thorsten Hohmann	10
(Philippines) Ronato Alcano	7
(United States) Gabe Owen	10
(Germany) Oliver Ortmann	6
(United States) Jeremy Jones	10
(Japan) Satoshi Kawabata	8
(Philippines) Gandy Valle	10
(Vietnam) Do Hoang Quan	8
(Chinese Taipei) Chen Ying-chieh	10
(Chinese Taipei) Chang Pei-Wei	5
(Philippines) Marlon Manalo	10
(United States) Charlie Bryant	9
(Chinese Taipei) Huang Chien-che	10
(Russia) Konstantin Stepanov	5
(Japan) Kunihiko Takahashi	10
(United States) Danny Basavich	8
(Finland) Mika Immonen	10
(Croatia) Ivica Putnik	2
(United States) Corey Deuel	10
(Chinese Taipei) Lai Chia-hsiung	2
(Germany) Harald Stolka	10
(Chinese Taipei) Fu Che-wei	6

Round of 32 (Race to 9)
(Chinese Taipei) Kuo Po-cheng	10
(Chinese Taipei) Liu Chun-chiang	4
(Czech Republic) Roman Hybler	10
(Chinese Taipei) Chao Fong-Pang	8
(Chinese Taipei) Huang Kun-chang	10
(Chinese Taipei) Hsia Hui-kai	8
(Philippines) Rodolfo Luat	8
(Vietnam) Thanh Nam Nguyen	10
(Chinese Taipei) Chang Jung-lin	10
(Philippines) Warren Kiamco	4
(United States) Rodney Morris	10
(England) Raj Hundal	9
(Hungary) Vilmos Földes	10
(Philippines) Alex Pagulayan	8
(Netherlands) Nick van den Berg	10
(Chinese Taipei) Wang Hua-fong	6
(Sweden) Marcus Chamat	10
(Canada) Alain Martel	1
(Chinese Taipei) Wu Chia-ching	10
(Germany) Andreas Roschkowsky	6
(England) Kevin Uzzell	7
(Germany) Thorsten Hohmann	10
(United States) Gabe Owen	5
(United States) Jeremy Jones	10
(Philippines) Gandy Valle	9
(Chinese Taipei) Chen Ying-chieh	10
(Philippines) Marlon Manalo	10
(Chinese Taipei) Huang Chien-che	0
(Japan) Kunihiko Takahashi	8
(Finland) Mika Immonen	10
(United States) Corey Deuel	10
(Germany) Harald Stolka	9

Round of 16 (Race to 11)
(Chinese Taipei) Kuo Po-cheng	11
(Czech Republic) Roman Hybler	4
(Chinese Taipei) Huang Kun-chang	11
(Vietnam) Thanh Nam Nguyen	4
(Chinese Taipei) Chang Jung-lin	8
(United States) Rodney Morris	11
(Hungary) Vilmos Földes	10
(Netherlands) Nick van den Berg	11
(Sweden) Marcus Chamat	4
(Chinese Taipei) Wu Chia-ching	11
(Germany) Thorsten Hohmann	11
(United States) Jeremy Jones	7
(Chinese Taipei) Chen Ying-chieh	0
(Philippines) Marlon Manalo	11
(Finland) Mika Immonen	11
(United States) Corey Deuel	8

Quarter-Final (Race to 11)
(Chinese Taipei) Kuo Po-cheng	11
(Chinese Taipei) Huang Kun-chang	7
(United States) Rodney Morris	11
(Netherlands) Nick van den Berg	10
(Chinese Taipei) Wu Chia-ching	11
(Germany) Thorsten Hohmann	5
(Philippines) Marlon Manalo	11
(Finland) Mika Immonen	9

Semi-Final (Race to 11)
(Chinese Taipei) Kuo Po-cheng	11
(United States) Rodney Morris	7
(Chinese Taipei) Wu Chia-ching	11
(Philippines) Marlon Manalo	5

Finale (Race to 17)
(Chinese Taipei) Kuo Po-cheng	16
(Chinese Taipei) Wu Chia-ching	17

== See also ==
- List of sporting events in Taiwan
- List of WPA World Nine-ball champions
