= 1997 WPA World Pool Championship =

WPA World 9-ball Championship 1997
Tournament information
- Sport: 9-ball
- Location: Chicago, United States
- Dates: October 1, 1997–October 5, 1997
- Tournament format: Round robin / Single Elimination
- Host: WPA World Nine-ball Championship
- Participants: 64

Final positions
- Champion: (United States) Johnny Archer
- Runner-up: (Chinese Taipei) Lee Kun-Fang

The 1997 WPA World Nine-ball Championship was a professional pool championship that took place in 1997 in Chicago, United States. The event was won by Johnny Archer, who defeated Kun-Fang Lee in the final 9–3. Defending champion Ralf Souquet was defeated in the semifinals 9-8 by Lee.

== Tournament Summary ==
Johnny Archer would win his second world nine-ball championship, after previously winning the event in 1992.

== Knockout stages ==
The following is the results from the knockout stages. Players competing had progressed through the earlier knockout round. All matches were played as race to 13 racks.

1st Round
TPE Kun Fang-Lee	13
PHL Warren Kiamco	11
USA Roger Griffis	12
GER Andreas Vondenhoff	13
GER Oliver Ortmann	7
TPE Min Wai Chin	13
USA CJ Wiley	13
TPE Kim Won Suk	6
JPN Takeshi Okumura	13
GER Christian Reimering	7
ENG Steve Knight	9
JPN Kunihiko Takahashi	13
TPE Wei Chi Chen	13
CHN Min You Chow	5
USA Kim Davenport	10
GER Ralf Souquet	13
USA Johnny Archer	13
MEX Ernesto Dominguez	8
GER Bernd Jahnke	6
PHL Efren Reyes	13
FIN Mika Immonen	13
USA Danny DiLiberto	6
SWE Tom Storm	13
JPN Syuji Nagata	10
USA Reed Pierce	13
USA George Breedlove	12
PHL Francisco Bustamante	13
PHL Rodolfo Luat	11
USA Jimmy Wetch	13
USA Edgardo Ramirez	4
JPN Akikumo Toshikawa	10
TPE S Hu Chen	13

2nd Round
TPE Kun Fang-Lee	13
GER Andreas Vondenhoff	6
TPE Min Wai Chin	13
USA CJ Wiley	8
JPN Takeshi Okumura	11
JPN Kunihiko Takahashi	13
TPE Wei Chi Chen	9
GER Ralf Souquet	13
USA Johnny Archer	13
PHL Efren Reyes	4
FIN Mika Immonen	13
SWE Tom Storm	9
USA Reed Pierce	13
PHL Francisco Bustamante	12
USA Jimmy Wetch	13
TPE S Hu Chen	12

Quarterfinals
TPE Kun Fang-Lee	13
TPE Min Wai Chin	12
JPN Kunihiko Takahashi	12
GER Ralf Souquet	13
USA Johnny Archer	13
FIN Mika Immonen	8
USA Reed Pierce	13
USA Jimmy Wetch	12

Semifinals
TPE Kun Fang-Lee	9
GER Ralf Souquet	8
USA Johnny Archer	9
USA Reed Pierce	4

Finals
TPE Kun Fang-Lee	3
USA Johnny Archer	9
