= Jason Kane =

British pool player nicknamed "Tiger" (born 1970)

Jason Kane (born 16 November 1970 in London, England) is a British pool player nicknamed "Tiger" who has won a number of pool championships and who has a mark in the Guinness Book of World Records. He is best known for his speed pool but he has also won artistic pool tournaments during his career.

In 2006, he competed in the first International Speed Pool Tournament. In the semi-finals, he was defeated by fellow-British player Dave Pearson who later lost in the finals to Luc Salvas.

Has worked on commercials and television including the USA Network's show White Collar, he was one of the pool scene coordinators and stunt doubles on Season 3, Episode 15 "Stealing Home".

== Speed pool ==
BCA Nationals Speed Pool Champion 2008, 2007, 2005, 2004, 2003, 2000

APA Camel Speed Shot Champion 2002, 2001

3rd place, 2006 ESPN international speed pool challenge

3rd place, 2009 ESPN international speed pool challenge

2009 ACS Speed Pool Champion

== Artistic pool ==
BCA Nationals Artistic Pool Champion 2009, 2008, 2001, 1999, 1998

APA Nationals/Worlds Artistic Pool Champion 2019, 2018, 2014, 2011, 2010, 2009, 2008, 2007

VNEA (Valley National 8-Ball Association) Artistic Pool International Champion 2026, 2024, 2021, 2016, 2015, 1998

1999 VNEA Artistic Pool World Champion

ACS Nationals Artistic Pool Champion 2019, 2018, 2016, 2011
