= Speed pool =

Billiards game

Speed pool (also called speedball), is a pool game, in which a player pockets all the balls on the table as quickly as possible. It can be played competitively with the aid of a stopwatch.

== Rules ==
- The cue ball must not be in motion when shooting

- Object balls can still be in motion when shooting

- Ball and pocket must be called, (no fluking the balls in)
- Legal shots must be made – a 10-second penalty is incurred for each foul.

- A legal shot involves the cue ball contacting an object ball, and driving it to a cushion, or the cue ball hitting a cushion after contact, or pocketing an object ball

- Any ball may be pocketed, except that the 8 ball must be last.

== Tournaments ==
Because speed pool is a relatively recent development, there are few tournaments devoted to it, though it has attracted some professional competition. One notable event was the International Speed Pool Challenge which was broadcast on ESPN. The games played in this event included one based on straight pool as well as the more common version described above, which is derived from eight-ball. The object in each match was to play all games with a shorter total time than other players. Luc Salvas was the first to win this event, which had a US$50,000 winner-take-all purse that year.

== Notable professional players ==
- Dave Pearson ("the Ginger Wizard")
- Luc Salvas
- Jeanette Lee ("the Black Widow")
- Bobby McGrath ("the Kid")
