= Santos Sambajon =

Filipino professional pool player (born 1960)

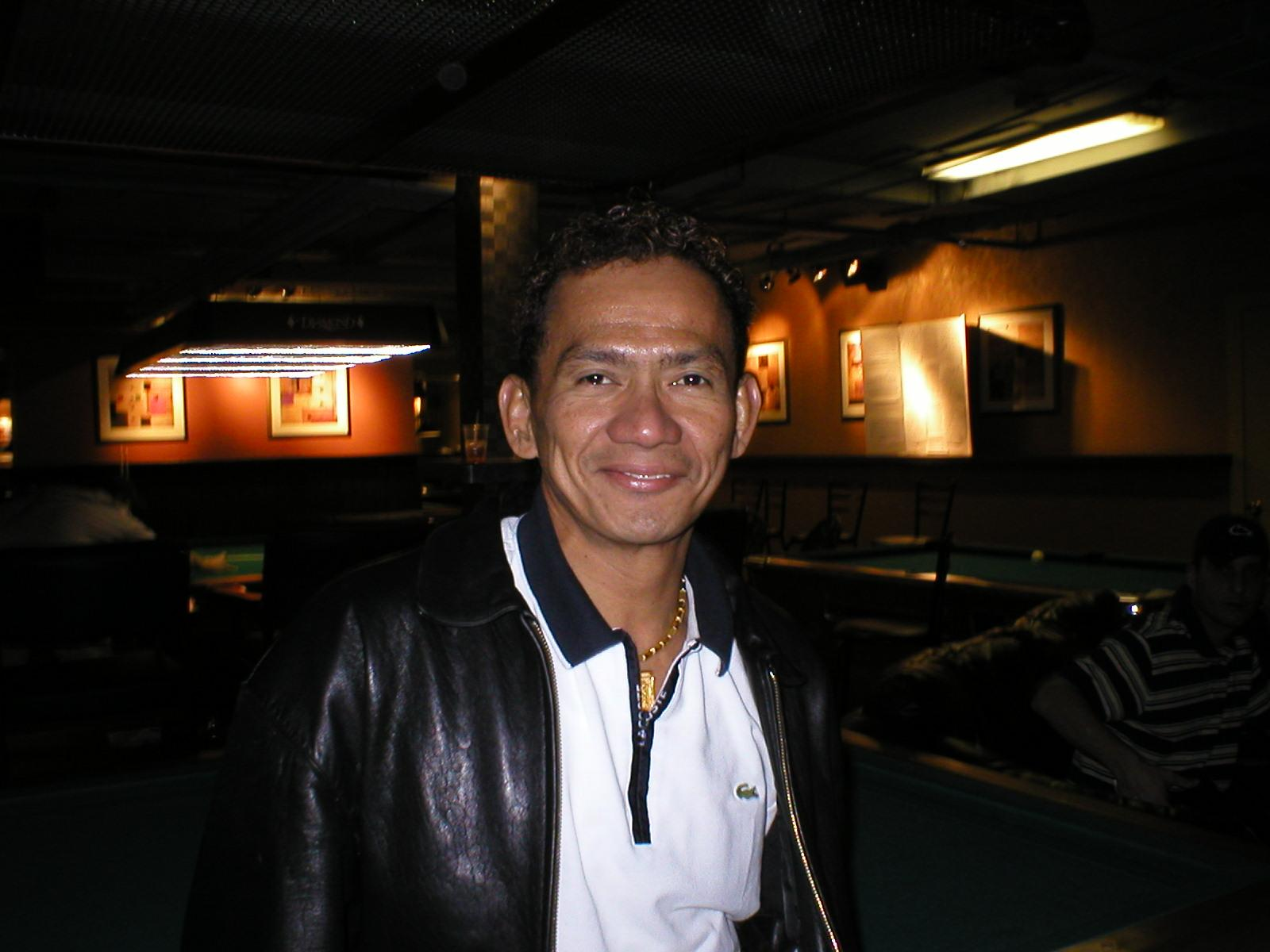
Santos Sambajon

Santos Sambajon (born September 10, 1960) is a Filipino professional pool player. His nicknames are "The Little Giant" and "The Saint." Originally from the Philippines, he now resides in the United States.

== Early life ==
Sambajon was born in Macalelon, Quezon on September 10, 1960. He started playing pool at age 7. He moved to Manila when he was 11.

== Professional career ==
In 1988, Sambajon won the Asian Open International Nine-ball Championship.

In 2004, Sambajon was first seen on television playing at the finals of the BCA Open Nine-ball Championship. While he did not win that event, Sambajon dominated the World Summit of Pool, a tournament featured on ESPN several months later, by defeating Mike Davis in the finals.

In 2005, he won the Skins Billiards Championship, another tournament televised on ESPN, by besting Danny Basavich in sudden death. This was Sambajon's greatest win, earning him $73,500, the most he has earned from a single event.

He nearly had the chance to compete in the WPA World Nine-ball Championship in 2004 but could not, due to passport problems. He made his debut at that tournament in 2006.

He served as Efren Reyes's corner man (players who reached the finals of an IPT event get to have someone who would instruct or give them advice during the match) at the final of the 2006 IPT World Open Eight-ball Championship.

== Titles ==
- 2007 Blaze Tour Stop
- 2007 Blaze 9-Ball Tour Stop
- 2005 Skins Billiards Championship
- 2005 Joss Northeast 9-Ball Tour
- 2004 World Summit of Pool
- 2004 Joss Northeast 9-Ball Tour
- 2004 Joss Northeast 9-Ball Tour
- 2004 Jay Swanson Memorial
- 2003 New England 9-Ball Championship
- 2003 Joss Northeast 9-Ball Tour
- 2003 Hard Times One Pocket Open
- 2003 Joss Northeast Tour
- 2002 Joss Northeast Tour
- 2000 Joss Northeast Tour
- 2000 California Billiard Club Open One Pocket
- 2000 Planet-Pool.com Tour
- 2000 Joss Northeast Tour

== Personal life ==
Sambajon has a wife named Annabel. The couple have 4 children whose names are Donna, Don, Dianne, and Donald.
