= 2006 Mosconi Cup =

- Dates: 7–10 December
- Venue: Rotterdam Cruise Terminal
- Location: Rotterdam, Netherlands
- Captains: Johan Ruijsink (EU); Johnny Archer (US)
- MVP: Corey Deuel (US)
- 12 – 12 United States retains the Mosconi Cup

The 2006 Mosconi Cup, the 13th edition of the annual nine-ball pool competition between teams representing Europe and the United States, took place 7–10 December 2006 at the Rotterdam Cruise Terminal in Rotterdam, Netherlands.

The event ended in a 12–12 draw, thus Team USA retained the Mosconi Cup as the prior year's winner. The possibility of ties was removed for the following year's event.

== Teams ==
Team USA
Name	State of birth	Notes
Earl Strickland	North Carolina
Rodney Morris	California
Corey Deuel	California	Most Valued Player
Mike Davis	North Carolina
John Schmidt	California
Johnny Archer	Georgia	Captain

Team Europe
Name	Nationality	Notes
Mika Immonen	Finland
Ralf Souquet	Germany
Imran Majid	United Kingdom
Thomas Engert	Germany
Nick van den Berg	Netherlands
David Alcaide	Spain
Johan Ruijsink	Netherlands	Non-playing captain

== Results ==
=== Thursday, 7 December ===
==== Session 1 ====
	Results
Teams; Team Europe	5–6	Teams; Team USA
Trebles; Mika Immonen; David Alcaide; Ralf Souquet	6–3	Trebles; Johnny Archer; John Schmidt; Mike Davis
Trebles; Imran Majid; Thomas Engert; Nick van den Berg	2–6	Trebles; Corey Deuel; Earl Strickland; Rodney Morris
1	Session	2
1	Overall	2

=== Friday, 8 December ===
==== Session 2 ====
	Results
Doubles; Mika Immonen; Ralf Souquet	6–2	Doubles; John Schmidt; Mike Davis
Doubles; David Alcaide; Thomas Engert	1–6	Doubles; Johnny Archer; Corey Deuel
Doubles; Nick van den Berg; Imran Majid	6–5	Doubles; Earl Strickland; Rodney Morris
2	Session	1
3	Overall	3

==== Session 3 ====
	Results
Singles; David Alcaide	7–5	Singles; John Schmidt
Singles; Imran Majid	7–2	Singles; Johnny Archer
Singles; Ralf Souquet	7–2	Singles; Corey Deuel
3	Session	0
6	Overall	3

=== Saturday, 9 December ===
==== Session 4 ====
	Results
Doubles; Nick van den Berg; Imran Majid	3–6	Doubles; Corey Deuel; Mike Davis
Doubles; Mika Immonen; David Alcaide	6–4	Doubles; Rodney Morris; Earl Strickland
Doubles; Ralf Souquet; Thomas Engert	6–1	Doubles; Johnny Archer; John Schmidt
2	Session	1
8	Overall	4

==== Session 5 ====
	Results
Singles; Mika Immonen	5–7	Singles; Rodney Morris
Singles; Thomas Engert	4–7	Singles; Earl Strickland
Singles; Nick van den Berg	7–4	Singles; Mike Davis
1	Session	2
9	Overall	6

=== Sunday, 10 December ===
==== Session 6 ====
	Results
Teams; Team Europe	3–6	Teams; Team USA
Triples; Imran Majid; Thomas Engert; Nick van den Berg	5–6	Triples; Corey Deuel; Earl Strickland; John Schmidt
Triples; Ralf Souquet; Mika Immonen; David Alcaide	1–6	Triples; Johnny Archer; Rodney Morris; Mike Davis
0	Session	3
9	Overall	9

==== Session 7 ====
	Results
Singles; Thomas Engert	5–1	Singles; John Schmidt
Singles; Imran Majid	2–5	Singles; Rodney Morris
Singles; Ralf Souquet	5–4	Singles; Johnny Archer
Singles; Nick van den Berg	5–4	Singles; Earl Strickland
Singles; Mika Immonen	4–5	Singles; Mike Davis
Singles; David Alcaide	2–5	Singles; Corey Deuel
3	Session	3
12	Overall	12
