= International Shuffleboard Association =

International Shuffleboard Association (ISA)
- Company type: 501(c)(3) non-profit organization
- Industry: Shuffleboard
- Founded: Saint Petersburg, Florida March 10, 1979
- Key people: President: Myrna Bilton
- Website: www.world-shuffleboard.org

The International Shuffleboard Association - ISA - was founded in Saint Petersburg, Florida in 1979. Shuffleboard is a competitive game played on marked floor courts. The ISA promotes Shuffleboard competition and travel worldwide. The 2009 Deck Shuffleboard championship in Zephyrhills, Florida at Betmar Shuffleboard Club featured 64 competitors.

== See also ==
- Billiard Congress of America
