= ACUI Collegiate Pocket Billiards National Championship =

The ACUI Collegiate Pocket Billiards National Championship, in recent years known more specifically as the ACUI Collegiate Nine-ball National Championship, was an amateur United States annual pool competition for university and college students, organized by the Association of College Unions International (ACUI). It was founded in 1937, and was one of ACUI's longest-running programs. In June 2020, the ACUI made the decision to discontinue their National Collegiate Pocket Billiards program.

== Format and other event details ==
The championship featured separate men's and women's divisions and champions since 1939. The event and its regional qualifying tournaments followed Billiard Congress of America (BCA) / World Pool-Billiard Association (WPA) world-standardized rules, and were double-elmiination in format. The championship was a BCA-sanctioned event, with champions listed as such in BCA's Billiards: The Official Rules and Records Book. BCA was involved in the events' promotion to varying degrees over the years, as was the Billiard Education Foundation (which operates the Junior National Nine-ball Championships, sometimes held jointly with the ACUI event since 2005). First- through fourth-place prizes were scholarship funds, ranging from US$1,000 down to $100 as of 2007.

The championships were usually held in May or June, with qualifying local tournaments held at individual educational institution campuses (or nearby facilities) during the fall and spring semesters. Regional, multi-state playoffs were held toward the end of the spring semester over a weekend, alongside other ACUI competitions, including table tennis, and College Bowl-style trivia.

== Name ==
The name of the ACUI championship changed over time, reflecting the particular pool discipline featured in the event. It was most recently known as the ACUI Collegiate Nine-ball National Championship (among various shorter formulations). Collectively, the events were known as the ACUI Collegiate Pocket Billiards National Championships (among shorter formulations). The event was sometimes referred to as international, owing to ACUI's name, but was a US national title.

== Champions and records ==
History of ACUI Billiards Champions since 1937:

=== Men's Champions ===
Year	Champion	Champion's School/University	Tournament Host
2019	Andreas Madsen	Lindenwood University	University of Illinois Urbana-Champaign
2018	Andreas Madsen	Lindenwood University	Purdue University
2017	Chris Reinhold	Lindenwood University	University of Michigan
2016	Sharik Sayed	Lindenwood University	Arizona State University
2015	Landon Shuffett	Lindenwood University	University of Akron
2014	Landon Shuffett	Lindenwood University	Virginia Polytechnic Institute and State University
2013	Raymond Linares	Miami Dade College–Kendall	Arizona State University
2012	Matt Shilinski	University of Maryland–College Park	Indiana University Bloomington
2011	Raymond Linares	Miami Dade College–Kendall	Virginia Polytechnic Institute and State University
2010	Raymond Linares	Miami Dade College–Kendall	University of Michigan
2009	Adam Maloney	Texas A&M University	Illinois State University
2008	Redante Rakin	California Polytechnic State University–San Luis Obispo	The University of Arizona
2007	Andy McKinn	California State University–Los Angeles	Minnesota State University, Mankato
2006	Lars Vardaman	Southern Illinois University–Edwardsville	The University of Arizona
2005	Lars Vardaman	Southern Illinois University–Edwardsville	University of Michigan
2004	Lars Vardaman	Southern Illinois University–Edwardsville	University of Colorado Boulder
2003	Adam Smith	Michigan State University	
2002	Jason Cruz	University of Puerto Rico	
2001	Jason Cruz	University of Puerto Rico	
2000	Ruben Silva Jr.	Pikes Peak Community College	
1999	Blucer Rajagukguk	Syracuse University	
1998	Christopher Biddle	University of Connecticut	
1997	Anthony Piazza	Colorado State University	
1996	Anthony Piazza	Colorado State University	
1995	Kevin Carlberg	Montana State University	
1994	Max Eberle	James Madison University	
1993	Max Eberle	James Madison University	
1992	David Uwate	University of Florida	
1991	Frank Alonso	University of Nebraska–Lincoln	
1990	Marc Oelslager	St. Cloud State University	
1989	Gary Asbell	Florida State University	
1988	Nick Kucharew	Mohawk College	
1987	Bill Beardsley	University of Michigan–Flint	
1986	Gary Asbell	Florida State University	
1985	No tournament held		
1984	Gary French	California State College–Stanislaus	
1983	Robert Madenjian	Kansas State University	
1982	Thomas Golly	Penn State University	
1981	No tournament held		
1980	Rob Hovick	University of Minnesota–Duluth	
1979	Peter Lhotka	University of North Dakota	
1978	Steve Cusick	University of Illinois–Urbana-Champaign	
1977	Jay Hungerford	Arizona State University	
1976	John Cianflone	Rutgers University	
1975	Bob Jewett	University of California–Berkeley	
1974	Dan Louie	Washington State University	
1973	Dan Louie	Washington State University	
1972	Andrew Tennent	University of Wisconsin	
1971	Keith Woestehoff	Ohio University	
1970	Nick Varner	Purdue University	
1969	Nick Varner	Purdue University	
1968	Marshall Boelter	University of Illinois–Chicago Circle	
1967	Richard Baumgarth	Purdue University	
1966	William Wells	Tulane University	
1965	William Wells	Tulane University	
1964	William Hendricks	Southern Illinois University	
1963	Larry Galloway	Indiana University	
1962	Robert Burke	University of Oregon	
1961	Jim Finucane	University of Notre Dame	
1960	Henry Parks	Indiana University	
1959	Donald Dull	State College of Washington	
1958	Lloyd Courter	State University of Iowa	
1957	Joseph Sapanaro	Suffolk University	
1956	Joseph Sapanaro	Suffolk University	
1955	Rodney Boyd	Ohio State University	
1954	John Beaudette	Michigan State College	
1953	John Beaudette	Michigan State College	
1952	Bill Simms	University of Georgia	
1951	Leroy Kinman	Eastern Kentucky State	
1950	Leroy Kinman	Eastern Kentucky State	
1949	Leroy Kinman	Eastern Kentucky State	
1948	Jack Brown	University of Utah	
1947	Leif Mabie	University of Florida	
1946	No tournament held		
1945	No tournament held		
1944	J. Zvanya	Indiana University	
1943	Leif Mabie	University of Florida	
1942	Leo Bonimi	Cornell University	
1941	Lloyd Green	University of Kansas	
1940	John O. Miller	University of Wisconsin	
1939	Peter Choulas	Colgate University	
1938	J. L. Geiger	University of Florida	
1937	John O. Miller	University of Wisconsin	

=== Women's Champions ===
Year	Champion	Champion's School/University	Tournament Host
2019	April Larson	Lindenwood University	University of Illinois Urbana-Champaign
2018	Taylor Hansen	Lindenwood University	Purdue University
2017	Briana Miller	Lindenwood University	University of Michigan
2016	Briana Miller	Lindenwood University	Arizona State University
2015	Briana Miller	Lindenwood University	University of Akron
2014	Briana Miller	Lindenwood University	Virginia Polytechnic Institute and State University
2013	Andrea Flores	Portland Community College	Arizona State University
2012	Michelle Yim	University of Houston	Indiana University Bloomington
2011	Delia Mocanu	Northeastern University	Virginia Polytechnic Institute and State University
2010	Lindsey Dorn	Purdue University	University of Michigan
2009	Shari Cui	University of Illinois–Chicago	Illinois State University
2008	Milica Kozomara	Northern Illinois University	The University of Arizona
2007	Eleanor Callado	San Francisco State University	Minnesota State University, Mankato
2006	Eleanor Callado	San Francisco State University	The University of Arizona
2005	Eleanor Callado	San Francisco State University	University of Michigan
2004	Maria Juana	University of Wisconsin–Madison	University of Colorado Boulder
2003	Eleanor Callado	San Francisco State University	
2002	Laura Lo	University of Colorado–Colorado Springs	
2001	Laura Lo	University of Colorado–Colorado Springs	
2000	Angela Mears	University of Michigan–Ann Arbor	
1999	Ellen Hale	Florida State University	
1998	Elania Wong	University of Illinois–Chicago	
1997	Heather Perrigoue	University of Wisconsin–Milwaukee	
1996	Erica Testa	University of New Hampshire	
1995	Heather Perrigoue	University of Wisconsin–Milwaukee	
1994	Rachel Ross	University of Washington	
1993	Carla Swails	College of Southern Idaho	
1992	Laura Bendikas	University of Illinois–Urbana-Champaign	
1991	Leanne Okada	University of California–Berkeley	
1990	Susan Tillotson	Florida State University	
1989	Cathy Petrowski	North Texas State University	
1988	Janet Dordell	Penn State University	
1987	Penny Beile	University of Kentucky	
1986	Kathy Trabue	Ohio State University	
1985	No tournamanet held		
1984	Shirley Weathers	Triton College	
1983	Helen Yamasaki	California State University–Los Angeles	
1982	Jane Bartram	University of Colorado	
1981	No tournamanet held		
1980	Shari Verrill	University of Wisconsin–Madison	
1979	Julie Bentz Fitzpatrick	University of Wisconsin–Madison	
1978	Mari Dana Heydon	Oregon State University	
1977	Julie Bentz	University of Wisconsin–Madison	
1976	Melissa Rice	University of Wisconsin–Milwaukee	
1975	Debra Weiner	Northern Illinois University	
1974	Janice Ogawa	Boise State University	
1973	Marcia Girolamo	State University of New York–Oswego	
1972	Krista Hartmann	Santa Fe Junior College (Gainesville, Fla.)	
1971	Marcia Girolamo	State University of New York–Oswego	
1970	Catherine Stephens	Western Washington State	
1969	Donna Ries	University of Missouri–Kansas City	
1968	Gail Allums	University of Iowa	
1967	Shirley Glicen	University of Miami	
1966	Linda Randolph	Iowa State University	
1965	Susan Sloan	University of Texas	
1964	Barbara Watkins	Bowling Green State University	
1963	Barbara Watkins	Bowling Green State University	
1962	San Merrick	Bowling Green State University	
1961	Ann Sidlauskas	Indiana University	
1960	Darlene McCabe	University of Oregon	
1959	Jan Deeter	Purdue University	
1958	Nancy Clark	University of Iowa	
1957	Judy Ferles	University of Arizona	
1956	Judy Ferles	University of Arizona	
1955	Lee McGary	University of Oregon	
1954	Joanne Skonning	Purdue University	
1953	Jackie Slusher	Oregon State College	
1952	Sondra Bilsky	Purdue University	
1951	Ramona Fielder	South Dakota State College	
1950	No tournament held		
1949	Cora Libbey	University of Wisconsin	
1948	Jeanne Lynch	Rhode Island State	
1947	No tournament held		
1946	No tournament held		
1945	No tournament held		
1944	Barbara Jackson	Colorado State College of Education	
1943	Mary Jean Noonan	South Dakota State College	
1942	Emily Ann Julian	South Dakota State College	
1941	No tournament held		
1940	No tournament held		
1939	Margaret Anderson	University of Illinois	

The 2015 winners and runners-up:

Women's division
First place: Briana Miller of Lindenwood University (defending 2014 division champion; 2010 Super Billiards Expo Nine-ball Champion (women's); former multi-year BEF Junior National Champion and 2010 WPA World Juniors runner-up; pro-am competitor in the WPBA since age 13)
Second place: Alex Bayless of Southern Illinois University–Edwardsville
Third place: Rachny Soun of James Madison University, Virginia

Men's division
First place: Landon Shuffett of Lindenwood University, Missouri (defending 2014 division champion; Kentucky State Men's Nine-ball Champion; and former multi-year BEF Junior National Champion)
Second place: Sharik Sayed of Lindenwood University
Third place: Touy Bouapha of Madison Area Technical College, Wisconsin

As of 2007, the player with the record number of first-place titles was Eleanor Callado, then of San Francisco State University, California, winning the women's division four times, in 2003 and 2005–2007 (taking second place in 2004).
