= WPA Asian Nine-ball Tour =

The WPA Asian Nine-ball Tour (also known as the Guinness Asian 9-Ball Tour or San Miguel Asian 9-Ball Tour for sponsorship reasons) was an annual series of nine-ball pool tournaments around East Asia and Southeast Asia. The tour began in 2003, and is sanctioned by the World Pool Billiard Association.

From 2003 to 2005, each leg had a field of 32 players and the total purse was US$50,000. In 2006, the number of players was reduced to 24 and total purse decreased to $40,000.

The winner in each leg of the tour receives a cash prize and points for the ranking for the yearly WPA World Nine-ball Championship.

San Miguel Beer and 188BET were the sponsor of the tournament prior to 2007, when this slot was taken over by Guinness.

== Format ==
In each leg, the 24 players are divided into 8 groups having 3 players each. The players in a particular group play in round-robin where the one who's on top moves into the quarter finals.

From the group stages to the quarter finals, the matchers are race to 9. The semis and final matches are race to 11. Also in the semi-finals and finals, a player must win by at least 2 racks. This means he can 11–9. If the other player manages to makes 10-10, the match goes into extra racks, one of them will have to make 12-10 or 13–11 to win. The maximum extension is up to 13, so it is also a win for a player to score 13–12.

A shot clock of 45 seconds is used with one extension for each player per rack. Failing to shoot within the clock will fine the player US$50.

The "alternating break" rule is enforced.

Starting in 2008, the final will be a race to 11 racks affair and the "at least 2 racks to win" rule has been scrapped.

== Tournament results ==
=== San Miguel era ===
Year	Location	Winner	Score	Runner-up
2003	Singapore	(Chinese Taipei) Yang Ching-shun	11-7	(Philippines) Warren Kiamco
2003	Philippines	(Philippines) Efren Reyes	11-2	(Philippines) Warren Kiamco
2004	Singapore	(Philippines) Efren Reyes (2)	11-4	(Philippines) Warren Kiamco
2004	Vietnam	(Philippines) Efren Reyes (3)	11-9	(Chinese Taipei) Chao Fong-pang
2004	Hong Kong	(Chinese Taipei) Yang Ching-shun (2)	11-9	(Chinese Taipei) Hsia Hui-kai
2004	Taiwan	(Philippines) Efren Reyes (4)	12-10	(South Korea) Jeong Young Hwa
2004	Philippines	(Philippines) Lee Vann Corteza	13-11	(Philippines) Francisco Bustamante
2005	Singapore	(Philippines) Gandy Valle	11-9	(Chinese Taipei) Wu Jia-qing
2005	Indonesia (Jakarta)	(Philippines) Efren Reyes (5)	11-6	(Chinese Taipei) Yang Ching-shun
2005	Taiwan (Kaohsiung)	(Chinese Taipei) Yang Ching-shun (3)	11-3	(Hong Kong) Au Chi-wai
2005	Philippines (Manila)	(Philippines) Ronato Alcano	11-6	(Chinese Taipei) Yang Ching-shun
2006	Vietnam (Ho Chi Minh City)	(Philippines) Efren Reyes (6)	11-6	(China) Li Hewen
2006	Thailand (Bangkok)	(Philippines) Ramil Gallego	11-8	(Hong Kong) Au Chi-wai
2006	Taiwan (Kaohsiung)	(Philippines) Rodolfo Luat	11-7	(Chinese Taipei) Hsia Hui-kai
2006	Indonesia (Jakarta)	(Philippines) Efren Reyes (7)	11-6	(Indonesia) Ricky Yang

=== Guinness era ===
Year	Location	Winner	Score	Runner-up
2007	Indonesia (Jakarta)	(Chinese Taipei) Chang Jung-lin	11-5	(Philippines) Lee Vann Corteza
2007	Taiwan (Kaohsiung)	(Chinese Taipei) Yang Ching-shun (4)	11-6	(Chinese Taipei) Chao Fong-pang
2007	Malaysia (Genting Highlands)	(Chinese Taipei) Chang Jung-lin (2)	11-8	(India) Dharminder Lilly
2007	Singapore	(Chinese Taipei) Yang Ching-shun (5)	11-8	(Malaysia) Ibrahim Bin Amir
2007	China (Shanghai)	(Chinese Taipei) Yang Ching-shun (6)	12-10	(Philippines) Ronato Alcano
2007	Indonesia (Bali)	(Chinese Taipei) Chang Jung-lin (3)	11-8	(Philippines) Lee Vann Corteza
2008	Taiwan (Taipei)	(Chinese Taipei) Chang Jung-lin (4)	11-5	(Philippines) Joven Bustamante
2008	Malaysia (Penang)	(Chinese Taipei) Chang Jung-lin (5)	11-7	(Chinese Taipei) Wang Hung-hsiang
2008	Malaysia (Genting Highlands)	(Chinese Taipei) Chang Jung-lin (6)	11-6	(Philippines) Antonio Gabica
2008	Singapore	(Philippines) Alex Pagulayan	11-6	(Philippines) Dennis Orcollo
2008	China (Guangzhou)	(Philippines) Dennis Orcollo	11-9	(Chinese Taipei) Wang Hung-hsiang
2008	Indonesia (Jakarta)	(Chinese Taipei) Yang Ching-shun (7)	11-9	(Chinese Taipei) Wu Jia-qing

== Trivia ==
- There were supposed to be 5 legs in 2003. But the other 3 were cancelled because of the SARS outbreak.
- All those who won a leg in the tour each won $10,000 for 1st place. However, Efren Reyes earned $20,000 for winning the Manila leg in 2003.
