= International Speed Pool Challenge =

American pool tournament, 2006–2010

The International Speed Pool Challenge is a pool (pocket billiards) tournament held in the United States from 2006 to 2010. It is the most notable speed pool event, as well as being the richest in prize money for that discipline. Luc Salvas won the 2010 championship, defeating Bobby McGrath in the finals.

Four players participate in the event, which is in single-elimination format. As of 2010, a winner-take-all prize of US$25,000 (previously $40,000) is offered. Each match consists of two sets of twelve racks (six for each player) where one of the contestants has to win them both (a short third extra set takes place if there's a split). A set is won should a player completes all his/her racks with a shorter total time (the sum for every single rack he/she plays) than the opponent. Players can pocket balls that are still in motion but as long as the cue ball is steady.

A penalty of 10 seconds is added to a player's total time in a particular set for every foul made. A bonus, by contrast, removes 10 seconds (see below).

Straight pool is the game played for the first set. It is also played for the third deciding set but only in two racks (one for each player). Here, players can strike and pocket any object ball on the table. However, the last one has to be "called" before being pocketed lest it would be a foul. A bonus is awarded to a player who pockets all balls without misses after the break.

Eight ball, which is a slightly more difficult game, is played in the second set. After the break, the player must choose which group of balls (1-7 or 9-15) he/she should pocket first and that the other group will be next. After both groups are pocketed, the eight ball is targeted which must also be "called." Pocketing the eight ball in the break is a bonus.

== Tournament champions ==
Year	Winner	Runner up	Location
2006	(Canada) Luc Salvas	(United Kingdom) Dave Pearson	Las Vegas, Nevada
2007	(United States) Bobby McGrath	(United Kingdom) Dave Pearson	Las Vegas, Nevada
2008	(United States) Bobby McGrath (2)	(United Kingdom) Dave Pearson	Las Vegas, Nevada
2009	(Canada) Luc Salvas (2)	(United Kingdom) Dave Pearson	Las Vegas, Nevada
2010	(Canada) Luc Salvas (3)	(United States) Bobby McGrath	Las Vegas, Nevada
