= Association of College Unions International =

Organization representing colleges in US

ACUI (Association of College Unions International) is one of the oldest associations in North American higher education, and dates to 1914. This association is the largest organization that represents student activity centers and student unions in the United States. As of 2016, the organization has 522 member institutions in ten countries.

== Reach ==
Although primarily a United States organization, with university and college campus organizations as members in all 50 US states, ACUI also has affiliated student unions in Australia, Bermuda, Canada, Guam, Ireland, Mexico, Puerto Rico, Qatar, and the United Kingdom.

== Educational programs ==
ACUI's educational programs including seminars, distance learning support, an annual conference, the Women's Leadership Institute, and the Institute for Leadership Education and Development (I-Lead).

== Intercollegiate competitions ==
ACUI is perhaps best known for organizing intercollegiate competitions in various non-contact sports and other activities, on a campus-team basis. These include nine-ball pool, table tennis, clay target shooting, air hockey, poetry slam, and formerly college bowl-style trivia competition.

=== Collegiate Pocket Billiards National Championship ===
Presently titled the ACUI Collegiate Nine-ball National Championship, the organization's pool tournament was inaugurated in 1937, has featured separate men's and women's divisions since 1939, and is supported by both the Billiard Congress of America (BCA) and the Billiards Education Foundation (BEF). The annual summer event's champions are listed in the BCA's Billiards: The Official Rules and Records Book.
