= Chris Reinhold =

American pool player (born 1997)

Personal information
- Born: 20 December 1997 (age 28) Ventura, California, United States

Pool career
- Country: United States
- Pool games: 9-Ball

Chris Reinhold (born 20 December 1997), formerly known as Chris Robinson, is an American professional pool player from Ventura, California. He competed on Team USA in the 2020 Mosconi Cup and the 2021 Mosconi Cup.

On Father's Day in 2021, he announced that he was adopting the last name of the stepfather who raised him, Jarod Reinhold.

== Titles ==
- 2021 Sidepocket Open 9-Ball Championship
- 2018 Annual Cole Dickson 9-Ball
- 2017 ACUI Collegiate National Championship
- 2025 Buffalo's Billiards Pro Classic Open 9 Ball
