= Jennifer Barretta =

American pool player (born 1968)

Personal information
- Nickname: 9mm
- Born: October 26, 1968 (age 57) Philadelphia, Pennsylvania, U.S.
- Website: Official website

Pool career
- Sport: Pool

Jennifer Barretta (born October 26, 1968), nicknamed "9mm," is an American pool player and television personality. In 2020, she achieved a ranking of No. 1 on the WPBA points list.

== Life and career ==
Barretta was born in Philadelphia, Pennsylvania. Before her pool career, she was an aspiring tennis player but found the sport too expensive when she moved to New York. After finding work as a fashion designer, she began playing pool in 1997 at the age of 29. She turned professional in 2003. By the start of 2005 she was 17 in the WPBA world rankings. In 2006, Barretta won the Empress Cup in Korea by defeating Ga Young Kim in the final. In 2011, she became the first woman to win an open event on the Predator Pro-Am Tour.

In 2020, Barretta reached the final of the WPBA Virtual 9‑Ball Ghost Challenge, finishing second to Kelly Fisher. In January 2020, she became number one on the WPBA points list after finishing runner-up to Fisher at the WPBA Ashton Twins Classic. As of 2025, Jennifer Barretta is listed among the Women's Professional Billiard Association's Elite Pros.

== Achievements ==
- 2011 - Wins Predator Pro-Am Tour event
- 2020 - Reached the No. 1 spot on the WPBA points list

== Media ==
Barretta appeared as an actress in the 2012 sports drama film 9-Ball as "Gail", which also featured Jeanette Lee. She appeared in the reality television series The Hustlers (2012–2013). She has been featured in magazines such as Maxim, Playboy, Sports Illustrated, FHM, ESPN, and Cigar Aficionado.
