= 2025 WPA World Nine-ball Championship =

Cue-sports championship tournament

Tournament information
- Sport: Nine-ball
- Location: Green Halls,Jeddah, Saudi Arabia
- Dates: July 21–26, 2025
- Host(s): WPA World Nine-ball Championship,Matchroom Pool
- Participants: 128

Final positions
- Champion: Carlo Biado (PHI)
- Runner-up: Fedor Gorst (USA)

The 2025 WPA World Nine-ball Championship was a nine-ball pool tournament contested between 21 and 26 July, 2025, at the Green Halls in Jeddah, Saudi Arabia.

The tournament had a prize pool of $1,000,000, with a $250,000 prize for the winner. The field consisted of 128 players with early rounds being played as a race-to-nine racks. Once the field was reduced to 64 players, matches were race-to-11. The final was a race-to-15. The defending champion was Fedor Gorst who won the 2024 edition of the event. The tournament was won by Carlo Biado of the Philippines, who defeated Gorst in the final 15-13.

== Prize money ==
The event saw a total prize pool of $1,000,000.

	Prize money
Winner	250.000 US$
Final	100.000 US$
Semi-final	50.000 US$
Quarter-final	15.000 US$
Last 16	15.000 US$
Last 32	7.000 US$
Last 64	3.500 US$
Last 96	2.500 US$
Last 128	1.500 US$
Total	1.000.000 US$
