= 1998 WPA World Nine-ball Championship =

WPA World 9-ball Championship 1998
Tournament information
- Sport: 9-ball
- Location: Taipei City, Taiwan
- Dates: November 11, 1998–November 15, 1998
- Tournament format: Round robin / Single Elimination
- Host: WPA World Nine-ball Championship
- Participants: 64

Final positions
- Champion: (Japan) Kunihiko Takahashi
- Runner-up: (United States) Johnny Archer

The 1998 WPA World Nine-ball Championship was a professional pool championship that took place in 1998 in Taipei City, Taiwan. The event was won by Kunihiko Takahashi who defeated defending champion Johnny Archer in the final.

== Knockout stages ==
The following is the results from the quarter-finals. Players competing had progressed through the earlier knockout round. Players in bold denote match winners. Matches were race-to-13.

Quarterfinals
**(United States) Jon Kucharo** | 13
(Philippines) Antonio Lining | 6
**(United States) Johnny Archer** | 13
(Denmark) Peter Nielsen | 8
(Chinese Taipei) Yang Ching-shun | 13
**(Japan) Akikumo Toshikawa** | 9
(Sweden) Niclas Bergendorff | 11
**(Japan) Kunihiko Takahashi** | 13

Semifinals
**(United States) Johnny Archer** | 13
(United States) Jon Kucharo | 3
**(Japan) Kunihiko Takahashi** | 13
(Japan) Akikumo Toshikawa | 2

Finals
(United States) Johnny Archer | 3
**(Japan) Kunihiko Takahashi** | 13

== See also ==
- List of sporting events in Taiwan
- List of WPA World Nine-ball champions
