= Danny Basavich =

American pool player

Daniel Basavich
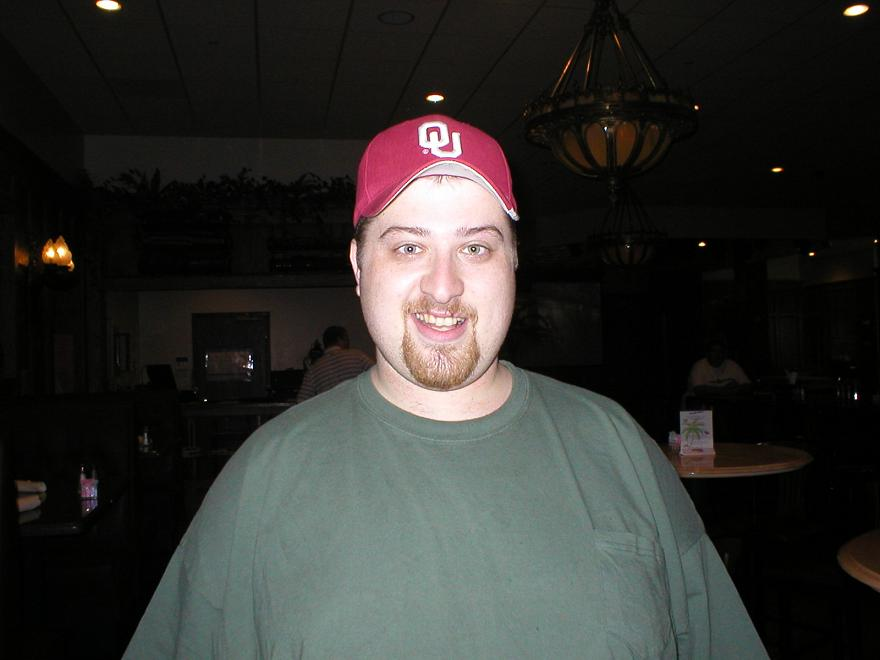
- Born: Daniel Basavich; September 25, 1978; Brooklyn, New York, U.S.
- Died: May 15, 2023 (aged 44); Manchester, New Jersey, U.S.
- Other name: Kid Delicious
- Occupation: Professional pool player
- Known for: Road hustling, professional pool tournaments
- Notable work: Running the Table (subject)
- Awards: United Pool Players Association Rookie of the Year (2004)

Daniel (Danny) Basavich (September 25, 1978 – May 2023) was an American professional pool player. Born in Brooklyn, New York, he spent much of his life in New Jersey. He acquired the nickname "Kid Delicious" after defeating a player monickered "Kid Vicious".

Basavich grew up in Manalapan Township, New Jersey. He died on either May 15 or 17, 2023, at his later home in Manchester, New Jersey.

== Professional career ==
Basavich was a notorious road player who hustled pool games across the country, but later decided to compete professionally in tournaments after becoming too well known to continue hustling.

In 2004, Basavich was named "Rookie of the Year" by the United Pool Players Association.

He made his first television appearance in the 2005 WPA World Nine-ball Championship, beating Hsia Hui-kai in the preliminary stages. He made another appearance at the 2005 Skins Billiards Championship. Basavich nearly won that tournament, but Santos Sambajon defeated him after winning the lag for last part of the sudden-death game and running out from the break.

In November 2004, Basavich defeated Corey Deuel as the Glass City Open in Toledo, Ohio, in a televised match where he broke and ran nine consecutive racks of nine-ball, resulting in a score of 10–2. He was defeated by Charlie Bryant in the finals.

L. Jon Wertheim wrote an article in Sports Illustrated about Basavich in its 2004 Super Bowl edition entitled "The Amazing Adventures of Kid Delicious and Bristol Bob". Wertheim subsequently wrote a book on Basavich's adventures entitled Running the Table: The Legend of Kid Delicious, the Last Great American Pool Hustler which was released in September 2007.

In 2005, Lions Gate entered into negotiations for a feature film to be loosely based on the life of Danny Basavich.

In 2006, Basavich released the first in his new line of billiards tutorials, The Kid Delicious Advanced Clock System and Banking Secrets produced by Pooljax productions.

== Filmography ==
- The Kid Delicious Advanced Clock System and Banking Secrets DVD (2006)
- Big Time Delicious Racking Secrets and Ultimate Pro Shotmaking DVD (2007)

== Titles ==
- 2005 Blaze 9-Ball Tour Championship
- 2005 Ocean State Championship
- 2004 Sands Regency 9-Ball Open
