= John Schmidt (pool player) =

American pool player (born 1973)

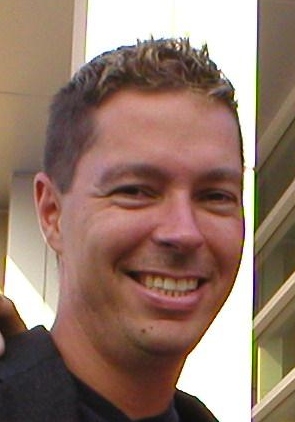
- Schmidt at the 2004 US Open 9-Ball Championship, Chesapeake Conference Center in Chesapeake, Virginia

Personal information
- Nickname: Mr. 600
- Born: April 12, 1973 (age 53) Keokuk, Iowa, US
- Spouse: Felicity Wimperis Schmidt (2017 March 27-present)

Pool career
- Country: United States
- Turned pro: 1999
- Pool games: Straight Pool, 9-ball

Tournament wins
- Major: US Open 9-Ball Championship (2006)

John Schmidt (born April 12, 1973) is an American pool player. Nicknamed "Mr. 600", specialising in straight pool, Schmidt held the record for the highest run made (626), until Jayson Shaw broke that record with a high run of 669 in January 2022. Schmidt won the U.S. Open 9-Ball Championships in 2006 defeating Rodolfo Luat in the final. He was also part of the American team at two Mosconi Cups in 2006 and 2014.

== Career ==
John Schmidt was born April 12, 1973, in Keokuk, Iowa. At a young age, he played as a golfer, winning tournaments at high school and college. He began playing pool at age 19, but didn't play his first professional tournament until he was aged 27 in 1999. Schmidt won the 2006 US Open 9-Ball Championship Championship, with a 11–6 victory in the final over Rodolfo Luat. Schmidt would later go on to win the Dragon 14.1 Tournament in 2012, winning 200–169 against Efren Reyes in the final.

On May 27, 2019, at Easy Street Billiards in Monterey, California, Schmidt defeated the longstanding 14.1 pool record run set by Willie Mosconi in 1954 of 526 with a video-recorded run of 626. Critics have argued that Mosconi's record was made in competition while Schmidt simply set up break shots for himself, and that his video was never released. Schmidt had made a personal best run of 403 balls in 2007, but in 2018, he began a concerted, dedicated effort to defeat Mosconi's record, shooting six to eight hours a day, filming the sessions for verification. Beginning May 8, 2019, the record was his fourth attempt.

Mike Panozzo, publisher of Billiards Digest, praised Schmidt's "focus and the perseverance to run 380, and then you miss and start over again." Mosconi's record 526 happened under circumstances somewhat different from those that Schmidt faced. Mosconi, then 40, was competing in an exhibition match with a man named Earl Bruney in Springfield, Ohio. Having defeated Bruney, he just kept shooting until he reached 526. Schmidt was purely going for the record, with no opponent, starting anew each time he fell short. In similar fashion as Schmidt, the record would be later broken in 2022 by Jayson Shaw of Scotland, who ran 669.

Filmed at the Derby City Classic, Schmidt ran 112 in straight pool on video by Accu-Stats, sharing many insights on the DVD version. Filmed at TAR Studio on July 13–15, 2012, Schmidt competed in an all-around challenge match against Corey Deuel in the disciplines of eight-ball, one-pocket, and ten-ball.

On March 10, 2026, John Schmidt recorded a personal high run of 820 consecutive balls in straight pool during a private session in Rock Springs, Wyoming.

== Titles and achievements ==
- 2003 Legends of Straight Pool Championship
- 2003 Emerald Coast 9 Ball Classic
- 2003 Sands Regency 9-Ball Open
- 2004 Seminole Florida Pro Tour
- 2006 U.S. Open 9-Ball Championship
- 2007 Viking Cues Southern Classic 10-Ball Open
- 2009 Derby City Classic One Pocket
- 2009 Super Billiards Expo Players Championship
- 2012 Maryland 14.1 Championship
- 2012 Dragon 14.1 Tournament
- 2019 14.1 Record High Run. 626 Consecutive Balls
