= Bobby McGrath =

American pool player

- Occupation: professional pool player

Bobby McGrath is an American professional pool player from Washington, Illinois, nicknamed "the Kid" for being one of the youngest professional pool players.

He won US$50,000 in the 2007 International Speed Pool Challenge, not only beating the UK's Dave Pearson (a long-time top ranking speed pool pro and holder of several world records), in the final, but also knocking out defending 2006 champion Luc Salvas of Canada, in the semi-finals. In 2008, McGrath met Pearson again at the finals of the International Speed Pool Challenge in Las Vegas, where he won it for the second time in a row.

He competed in 2007 in the amateur VNEA Speed Pool Championship, which he won.

== Wins ==
- 2007 - International Speed Pool Challenge
- 2008 - International Speed Pool Challenge
- 2016 - Quad City One Pocket Classic, 1st place
