= Max Eberle =

American professional pool player

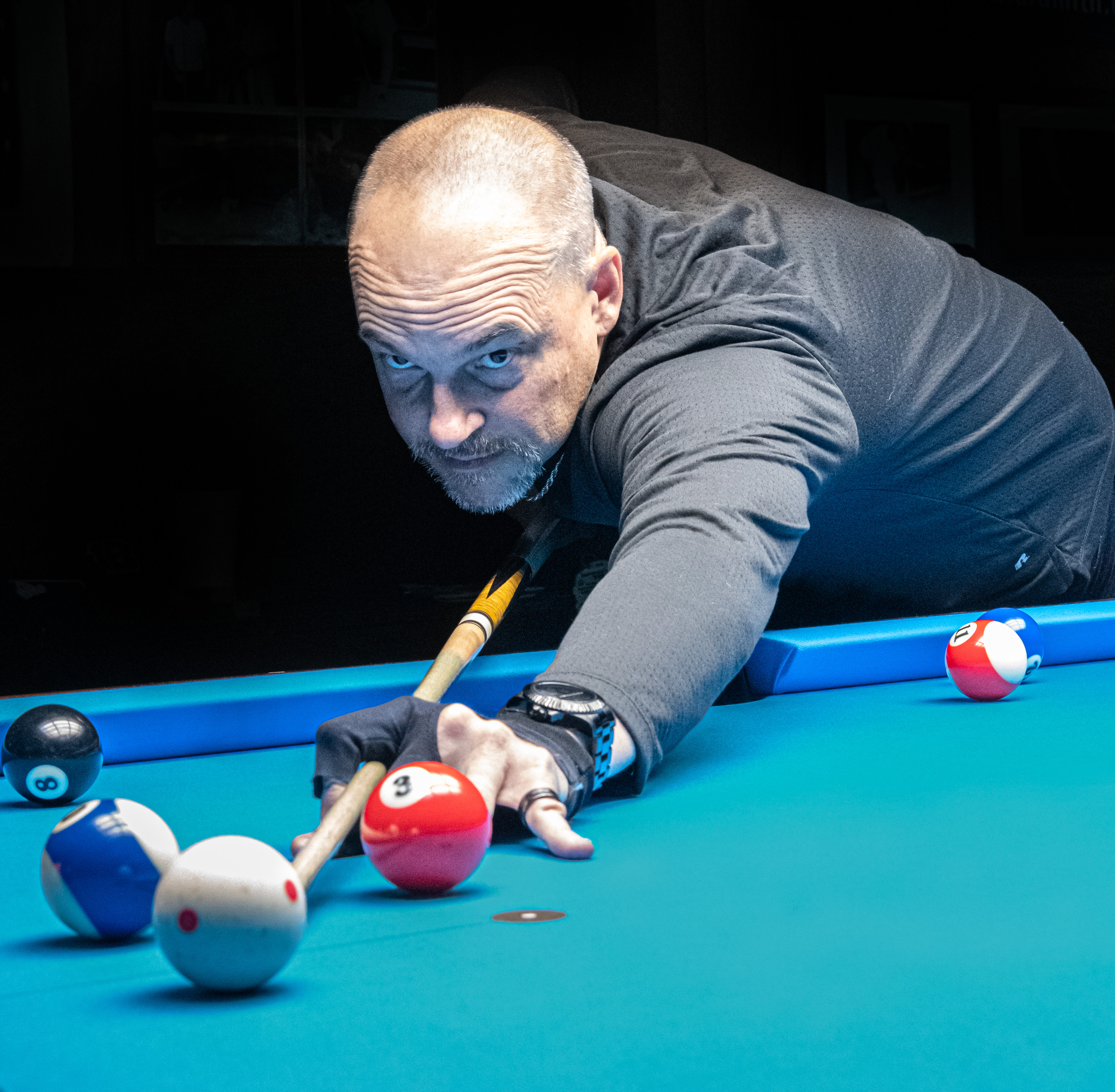

Personal information
- Born: 27 November 1972 (age 53) Las Vegas, Nevada, U.S.
- Website: https://maxeberle.com/

Pool career
- Country: United States
- Pool games: Nine-ball, Straight pool

Max Eberle (born November 27, 1972, in Las Vegas, Nevada) is an American professional pool player. Eberle reached the semi-finals of the Dragon 14.1 Tournament, in 2006. Eberle won the 2013 Derby City Classic 14.1 Challenge, He won the BCA National Junior Championship in 1991.

Eberle has written the book: Zen Pool: Awaken the Master Within in 2007.

== Titles & Achievements ==
- 2020 Jay Swanson Memorial 9-Ball
- 2019 ABN Dream Challenge Team USA vs. Russia
- 2013 Derby City Classic 14.1 Challenge
- 2008 Battle of Los Angeles
- 2005 Pechauer West Coast Tour
- 2004 Labor Day Tournament
- 2003 Total Offense Pool Event
- 1994 ACUI Collegiate National Championship
- 1993 ACUI Collegiate National Championship
- 1991 BCA National Junior Championship
