= Jimmy Wetch =

American professional pool player

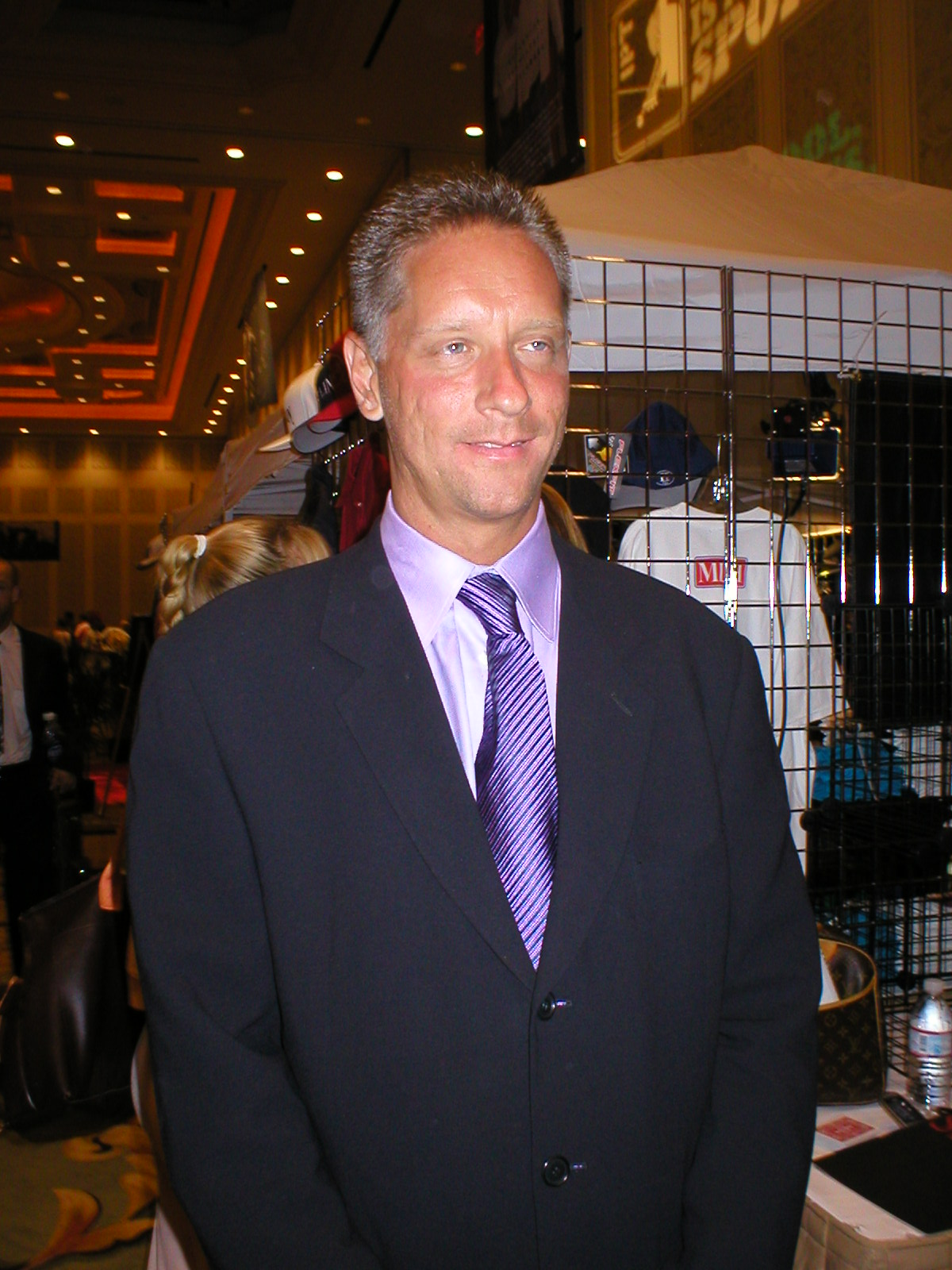
- Wetch at the IPT North American Eight-ball Championship

Personal information
- Nickname: "The Kid"
- Born: 23 April 1968 (age 58) St. Paul, Minnesota, U.S.

Pool career
- Country: United States
- Turned pro: 1986
- Pool games: nine-ball
- Best finish: Quarter finals 1997 WPA World Nine-ball Championship

Jimmy Wetch (born April 23, 1968, in St. Paul, Minnesota), also known by his nickname "the Kid", is an American professional pool player. He was at one time a feared road player, later becoming an accomplished tournament pro, having won numerous competitions. He was ranked fifth in the world by the Pro Billiards Tour (PBT) in 1996.

== Early years ==
The son of Jimmy Sr., the owner of a painting business, and Janice Wetch, a switchboard operator, he has one sibling, Sharon, who is four years his junior. His early life was characterized by instability. Wetch's parents divorced when he was nine, remarried when he was 17, and again divorced after a short time. Wetch would sometimes live with one parent, and sometimes with the other, or both when they were together, and each of his parents moved a number of times, though always in or around the Twin Cities area. Wetch never went to the same school for more than two years in a row. "It still probably affects me," said Wetch in a 1999 interview, "To this day I'm not very good at interacting with people."

At a young age, Wetch became fascinated with gambling, so much so that his mother threatened to enter him in Gamblers Anonymous. He pitched coins, played cards, bet on sports, and even on pinball. His other gambling pursuits tapered off when he discovered a pool table at 13 while playing cards in a friend's basement. Wetch was soon hooked, spending as much time as possible in a local pool room called the Rack & Cue, playing eight ball and nine ball for 20 cents a game or more. He earned free table time by recording high scores on the room's video games.

Wetch's talent was quickly evident: A month after taking up the sport he was already beating his father, who was a decent recreational player. Pool became his passion. He would practice his stroke at the kitchen table, attempting to keep his stroke perfectly level by passing it through a hollowed-out cube of pool chalk without touching the sides, and stain his father's towels wiping down the shaft of his cue stick. Every night after completing his homework, he would head to the pool room to practice. He was known there for pestering all the better players for tips to improve his game.

By 15 years of age, Wetch had run 50 balls at straight pool, calling each shot in advance, as is mandatory in the game. At 16, he posted a run of 131 balls, and at 17 he won the 1985 Minnesota State Championship. Wetch had theretofore been a decent student, but pool had become all he thought about. He soon dropped out of St. Paul's Humboldt High School, to take up the life of a road player. He set off with a family friend, one Joe Saad, who acted as his backer on the road. By that time, he had already earned the nickname, "the Kid", given to him by a manager of Minnesota Billiards, one of the pool rooms in which Wetch had cut his teeth.

== On the road ==
Wetch kept at the hustle for a number of years. Joe Saad would back him with thousands of dollars, sometimes accompanying him on his trips, and sometimes not. Wetch was soon playing matches for huge stakes; Up to $10,000 bet on a single session. In addition to Saad, Wetch was fostered by others such as veteran road player Jack Cooney, a hustler who often went under the assumed name George Carlson and was twenty years Wetch's senior. "He taught me how to survive out there, to be patient for decent games and to manage my money right."

However, Wetch's love for gambling and for pool did not translate into a love of the hustle. He did it because it was the only way he knew how to make money doing what he loved, but he never liked "the stalling, the moving, the mismatches, the phony names."

"I never felt good about the hustling. No matter how much money I made at it, I knew I didn't want to keep doing it. Frankly, when no one knows how you play, it's like putting a gun to someone's head. It wasn't a matter of whether you were going to win, but how much you were going to win, Early on, you make money everywhere you go. Then it all disappears."
– Wetch, in Billiards Digest (1999)

The event that finally took him off the road came in Houston in 1993. He had made a large score playing high-stakes pool one night. The following morning while attempting to leave his hotel room with his then-girlfriend, two men shoved the two back into the room and at gunpoint demanded the money he had won. Not satisfied with the amount of money Wetch handed over, they placed a bag over his head and beat him. Though he escaped the ordeal with only minor injuries, he promised himself he would only make one more road trip to gather a stake, and then he would quit. He made that final trip and used the money to open up a pool room with partner David Wagner, Jimmy's Pro Billiards in Columbia Heights, Minnesota. The following year, in 1994, he took the ultimate step for a road player, shucking aside his anonymity by going pro.

== Career ==
In the 1994 Super Billiards Expo Players Championship in Valley Forge, Pennsylvania, he finished third, knocked out by the ultimate winner, dominant pro Mike Sigel with a score of 9 to 8. Later that year he took first place at the McDermott Masters and was ranked sixteenth in the world by the PBT and named their rookie of the year. In 1995 he won the Huebler Cup and in 1996 a tour stop at Great Gorge, New Jersey, as well as three second-place finishes at tour events, including a tense 8–6 loss in the finals of the 1996 PBT Riviera Eight-ball Championship at the hand of the Magician, Efren Reyes. His PBT rank increased that year to fifth.

Despite his success on the pro tour, Wetch couldn't make enough money on tournament purses alone. He said in a 1999 interview: "Back in 1996, I thought this game was going somewhere. We were on TV, we were making pretty good money. I was proud to be a pool player back then ... [but now] I'm just going to put more effort and time into my room.... The bottom line is, you gotta make money to survive. I don't want to be another statistic." Today Wetch lives in Eagan, Minnesota, not far from his pool room at Jimmy's Pro Billiards.

Wetch remains an active player at professional pool events but has not broken into the top ten since his high finish in 1996. In 2006 he was selected as one of 150 players to compete on the International Pool Tour. He finished 77th in the rankings, earning a total of $15,000 in prize funds. Wetch is currently sponsored by Schön cues.

== Titles ==
- 1991 Midwest Open 9-Ball
- 1995 Huebler Cup Open 9-Ball
- 1994 McDermott Masters 9-Ball Championship
