= Jeanette Lee =

American pool player (born 1971)

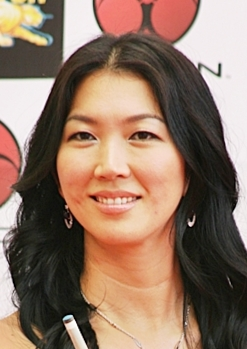

Personal information
- Nickname: Black Widow
- Born: July 9, 1971 (age 55) Brooklyn, New York, U.S.

Sport
- Country: United States
Medal record
Women's nine-ball
Representing United States
World Games
Gold medal – first place	2001 Akita	Individual

Jeanette Lee (born Lee Jin-Hee, Korean: 이진희, July 9, 1971) is an American professional pool player. She was nicknamed the Black Widow because, in spite of her sweet demeanor, she would "eat people alive" when she got to a pool table and always wear black when playing pool.

== Career ==
Lee was born to Korean-immigrant parents in Brooklyn in 1971. She attended the Bronx High School of Science before dropping out, finished 2 1/2 years of college, majoring in Early Childhood Development, before deciding to go full time after making a career in billiards, earning money as a teenager by nannying and waitressing to pay for her table time. Lee started playing pool in 1989, after watching pro George Makula at Chelsea Billiards in Manhattan. She began her career playing in the local and regional scenes of New York City, including the Howard Beach Billiard Club in Queens, owned by music producer Gabe Vigorito, who first compared her demeanor to a black widow spider and financed her early tournament expenses. She went on to rank as the No. 1 female pool player in the world during the 1990s, and received the Women's Professional Billiard Association (WPBA) Sportsperson of the Year Award in 1998. She was three times runner-up at the World Nine-ball Championships (women's), from 1993 to 1996. She is also a US Open 9-ball Champion, WPBA National Champion, McDermott 8-ball bar-table world champion, National 3-cushion Billiard Champion, and Trick Shot World Champion. In addition to many top finishes on the WPBA Tour, she won the gold medal for the United States at the 2001 World Games in Akita, Japan, and won the ladies' US$25,000 winner-take-all Tournament of Champions twice, in 1999 and 2003. Lee also co-wrote The Black Widow's Guide to Killer Pool.

In 2001, Lee challenged Efren Reyes to a race-to-13 exhibition match at nine-ball, in Manila, Philippines, but lost 4–13.

In 2013, Lee was inducted into the Billiard Congress of America Hall of Fame.

In 2015, was inducted into the Asian Hall of Fame based in Seattle, Washington.

In 2017, was inducted into the Women's Professional Billiards Association Hall of Fame.

In 2022, ESPN made a 30 for 30 documentary on Jeanette's story, called "Jeanette Lee Vs", sharing her beginnings, her journey with Stage 4 Ovarian Cancer, and how her experiences have built her into who she is today.

Lee voices a fictionalized version of herself in the 2025 Adult Swim original series Haha, You Clowns.

== Outside competition ==
As someone who has suffered from scoliosis, Lee is a strong supporter of those affected by the disease, and now serves as the national spokesperson for the Scoliosis Association. Lee appeared on Fox Sports Net's Sport Science, where she pocketed 12 balls in one trick shot, on March 30, 2008. Orange County Choppers built the Black Widow Bike in Lee's honor on the TV show American Chopper.

== Personal life ==
Lee lives in Tampa, Florida, with her three daughters and foster-son. Lee has three additional adult children, two of whom are her step-daughters from her marriage to George Breedlove, a professional pool player nicknamed "the Flamethrower". Lee and Breedlove married in 1996, but have since separated.

In February 2021, she announced that she had been diagnosed with stage IV ovarian cancer. In May 2022, it was reported that her chemotherapy treatments were "successful" A documentary about her life directed by Ursula Liang, Jeanette Lee Vs., premiered at the Doc NYC film festival on November 12, 2022. The film is part of the acclaimed ESPN series 30 for 30. The film had its television debut on December 13, 2022, on ESPN. The film was also shown at the 2024 Freep Film Festival as part of the Asian American Pacific Islander Film Series. Lee appeared as herself in the 2012 sports drama film 9-Ball, which focuses on professional nine-ball pool and features several real-life professional players, including Jennifer Barretta and Allison Fisher.

== Titles and achievements ==
- 2020 BCA President's Award
- 2015 Asian Hall of Fame
- 2013 Billiard Congress of America Hall of Fame
- 2013 WPBA Hall of Fame
- 2013 Four Bears Classic 8-Ball
- 2007 Billiards Digest Sports Most Powerful Person
- 2007 Skins Billiards Championship Scotch Doubles
- 2007 Empress Cup Championship
- 2005 Billiards Digest Sports Most Powerful Person
- 2005 China Invitational Championship
- 2004 Atlanta Women's Open
- 2004 ESPN Ultimate Challenge
- 2004 Mohegan Trick Shot Challenge
- 2004 WPBA Florida Classic Hard Rock Casino
- 2003 Billiards Digest Sports Most Powerful Person
- 2003 Tournament of Champions
- 2001 Billiards Digest Sports Most Powerful Person
- 2001 World Games Nine-ball Singles
- 2001 BCA Open Nine-ball Championship
- 1999 WPBA Southern California Classic
- 1999 WPBA Gentleman Jack Shootout
- 1999 ESPN Ultimate Champions Shootout
- 1999 Tournament of Champions
- 1998 WPBA Sportsperson of the Year
- 1998 Camel 9-Ball Shootout Scotch Doubles - with (Steve Mizerak)
- 1998 ESPN Ultimate 9-Ball Challenge
- 1998 ESPN Ultimate Champions Shootout
- 1998 WPBA Penn Ray Classic
- 1998 WPBA Cuetec Cues Hawaii Classic
- 1997 WPBA Huebler Classic
- 1997 WPBA Olhausen Classic
- 1996 WPBA Charlotte Classic
- 1995 WPBA Olhausen Classic
- 1995 WPBA Brunswick Classic
- 1995 McDermott 9-Ball Bar Table Championship
- 1994 Billiards Digest Player of the Year
- 1994 Mosconi Cup
- 1994 WPBA U.S. Open 9-Ball Championship
- 1994 WPBA Baltimore Billiards Classic
- 1994 WPBA Kasson Classic
- 1994 WPBA San Francisco Classic
- 1994 WPBA National Championship
- 1994 Connecticut State Championship
- 1993 North East Regional
- 1993 WPBA Connecticut Classic
