= Skins Billiards Championship =

Annual nine-ball tournament in the United States (2005–2007)

The Skins Billiards Championship was an annual nine-ball tournament held in the United States from 2005 through 2007. It was promoted by Allen Hopkins Productions and Billiards International, and was broadcast on ESPN. While most pool tournaments pit pairs of players against each other in matches, this event featured four players per side. While prize money in other events is fixed, such that players win money depending on where they finish in the tournament bracket, the prize money a player earned in the Skins Billiards Championship depended on the course of the game. This tournament got its name because its format is based on skins game, a variation of golf.

== Format ==
Two players play in each frame. When a player wins one, he/she stays to play the next. The defeated player is replaced by another who has the option to have the break shot or pass it.

| Rack | Monetary Value |
|---|---|
| 1 | $3,000 |
| 2 | $3,000 |
| 3 | $3,000 |
| 4 | $4,000 |
| 5 | $4,000 |
| 6 | $4,000 |
| 7 | $5,000 |
| 8 | $5,000 |
| 9 | $5,000 |
| 10 | $6,000 |
| 11 | $6,000 |
| 12 | $6,000 |

The table above shows an example of frames (racks) listed with each having a certain monetary value. To win prize money, a player must win three consecutive racks. The first three racks above are worth $3,000 each. Should a player win all three, he/she wins the total sum of them, $9,000.

If no player wins three racks in a row, the monetary value of the racks not won will be added to the next until one player successfully manages to win three in a row.

If a player wins the eleventh money rack without winning the previous one and goes on to win the twelfth, an extra rack is added to the match where he/she has to win to earn any money. And if a player wins the twelfth money rack without winning the previous one, he/she will have to win two extra racks to win any money.

When all the racks concluded and there's still money to be won, the four players draw spots to play in the sudden-death playoff. The first two players will face each other in one rack then so will the next two. The winner of the two brackets face each other in one last rack where the winner takes all the remaining money.

== Winners ==
| Year | Location | Winner | Tournament Earnings |
|---|---|---|---|
| 2004 | Atlantic City, New Jersey | Niels Feijen | $42,500 |
| 2005 | Atlantic City, New Jersey | Santos Sambajon | $73,500 |
| 2007 | Springfield, Massachusetts | George Breedlove/Jeanette Lee | $40,000 |

== 2007 event and prize money decline ==
After not being held since 2005, the Skins Billiards Championship once again held another edition in the beginning of 2007. Four players compete in the event like in previous years. However, two play as a team making a doubles match.

The 2007 event lowered its total prize money to $40,000 in 2007, a large drop compared to 2005 ($130,000). The number of players in contention decreased from 16 to 4. The reason for these declines were never explained.
