= Rotterdam Cruise Terminal =

Cruise ship terminal in Rotterdam

Coordinates: 51°54′21″N 4°29′12″E

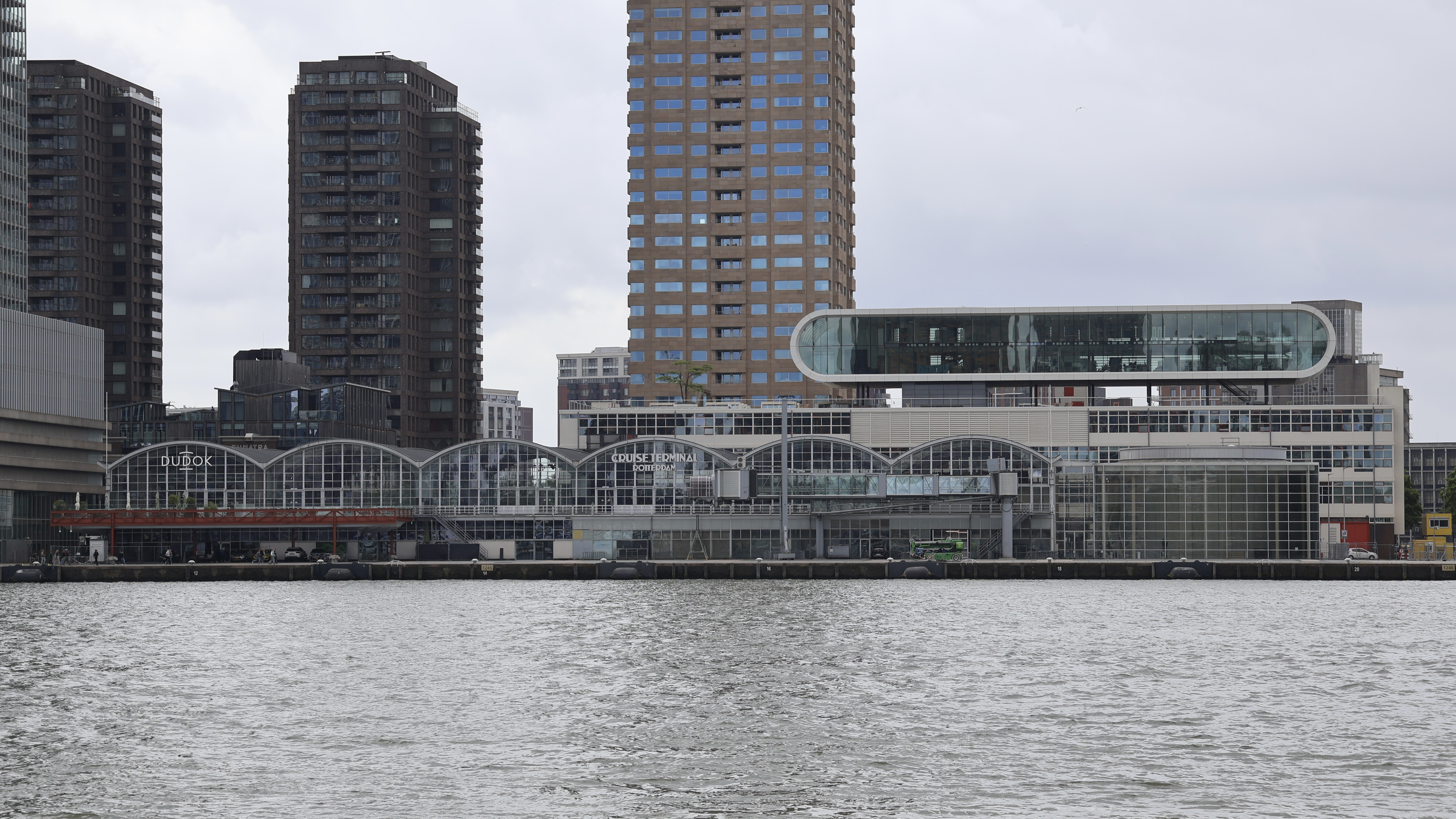
Cruise Terminal Rotterdam in 2025

The Rotterdam Cruise Terminal is a building on the Wilhelmina Pier, Rotterdam.

The Cruise Terminal served as the arrival and departure point of Holland America Line and is considered part of the city’s social and industrial heritage. The Cruise Terminal is still used by large passenger vessels that visit Rotterdam. The Terminal is now known for its cafe/restaurant located inside with a hall of 3,800 square metres (41,000 sq ft).

The "Turquoise Carpet" event for the Eurovision Song Contest 2021 took place at the Terminal on 16 May 2021. The Terminal was due to host the "Golden Carpet" and Opening Ceremony events for the Eurovision Song Contest 2020 before its cancellation.
