= Dave Pearson (pool player) =

British professional pool player

Dave Pearson is a British professional pool player.

Pearson was the runner-up in the International Speed Pool Challenge four years in a row, losing to Luc Salvas in the 2006 and 2009 finals, and to Bobby McGrath in the 2007-2008 finals.
