= Lee Kun-fang =

Taiwanese pool player

Lee Kun-fang (Chinese: 李昆芳) (born 1968) is a Taiwanese professional pool player. He came close to winning his first world title at the 1997 WPA World Nine-ball Championship, but the American Johnny Archer defeated him in the final match 9–3. In 1998, Lee won the International Challenge of Champions, defeating Takahashi Kunihiko, a former world champion from Japan. He finished runner-up at the 1997 Philippines Pool Championship.

== Titles ==
- 1998 International Challenge of Champions
