= Rodolfo Luat =

Filipino pool player (born 1957)

Personal information
- Nickname: "Boy Samson"
- Born: 8 December 1957 (age 68) Angeles, Pampanga, Philippines

Pool career
- Country: Philippines
- Turned pro: 1973
- Best finish: Quarter finals 2006 WPA World Nine-ball Championship
Medal record
Representing Philippines
Men's nine-ball
Southeast Asian Games
Gold medal – first place	1999 Bandar Seri Begawan	Team

Rodolfo Luat (born December 8, 1957) is a Filipino professional pool player from Angeles City. He holds many Asian titles and has won a few titles in U.S. Luat turned professional at age 16. He has titles in the Asian Championship and the Philippine Nine-ball Open in 1992. In 1996 Luat won the Camel Open 9-Ball Championship defeating Nick Varner in the finals.

"Boy Samson" is a moniker he has carried since the 1970s because of his powerful break. During the 2003 Asian Nine-ball Tour, Luat commented that he broke so hard one time that he made a crack on the cue ball.

== Career ==
In 1978, Luat represented Team Philippines in the Philippines-Japan Rotation Friendship Tournament, alongside Jose Parica, Efren Reyes, Jorge Dacer, and Manuel Flores.

He won the Taiwan leg of the 2006 WPA Asian Nine-ball Tour beating Hsia Hui-kai 11–7 in the finals. He participated in the 2006 International Pool Tour IPT North American Open Eight-ball Championship held at Las Vegas, Nevada.

Very skilled players in nine-ball have the tendency to sometimes pocket four or even five balls on the break. Luat, at the 2005 Japan Open 9-Ball held in Tokyo, sank six balls on the break,

Luat, 50, won the $15,000 top prize of the Bacolod leg, of the First Senate President Manny Villar Cup, on November 16, 2008. At the Garden Royal Function Hall of Goldenfields Commercial Complex, Luat defeated Ramil Gallego, 13–10.

== Titles and achievements ==
- 2008 Manny Villar Cup 9-ball Open
- 2006 San Miguel Asian 9-Ball Tour (Taiwan Leg)
- 2005 Hokuriku 9-Ball Open
- 2004 JPBA Senior Open
- 2000 Viking Nine-ball Tour Stop
- 1999 Southeast Asian Games Nine-ball Team
- 1999 Northwest 9-Ball Open
- 1996 Camel Open 9-Ball Championship
- 1993 PBT Riviera Team Championship
- 1992 Philippine 9-Ball Open
- 1991 Asian 9-Ball Championship
- 1991 Taipei Cup
- 1979 Philippines-Japan Team Rotation Competition
- 1978 Philippines-Japan Team Rotation Competition

== Personal life ==
Luat and his wife have two children, Geraldine Luat and Richard Bryan Luat.
