= Kevin Uzzell =

English pocket billiards player

Kevin Uzzell is an English pocket billiards player. During the 2006 Men's World 9-Ball Championship he survived the group stages and the round of 64, but was eliminated in the round of 32 by Pat Holtz.
