= Ramil Gallego =

Filipino professional pool player

Ramil "Bebeng" Gallego (Spanish pronunciation: [ɡaˈʎeɣo]; Hiligaynon pronunciation: [gaˈljɛgɔ]) (b. September 21, 1966 in Bacolod, Negros Occidental) is a Filipino professional pool player.

As veteran player, Gallego has been competing in tournaments outside the Philippines, mainly in Japan. The Philippine public started to know him very well when he competed in the Motolite International Tournament (won by Francisco Bustamante) and the Rising Stars Tournament (won by Edgar Acaba).

Among the Philippine players, Gallego is capable of speaking Japanese. Thus, he is occasionally being used as a translator when in Japan.

Ramil Gallego, 41, edged Francisco Bustamante, 10–9, in the semis, and defeated Carlo Biado, 11–7, in the finals to win on July 28, 2008, the first P 300,000 Manny Villar Cup Bulacan leg at the Event Center of SM City, Marilao.

Gallego has won a number of tournaments, mostly in Asia. His most notable one is when he won the Bangkok Leg of the 2006 WPA Asian Nine-ball Tour against Au Chi-wai of Hong Kong.

== Titles ==
- 2010 Kanto Open 10-Ball
- 2010 Okayama Open 9-Ball
- 2009 Japan Open 9-Ball
- 2009 Hokuriku Open 9-Ball
- 2008 All Japan 14.1 Championship
- 2008 Manny Villar Cup Tournament
- 2007 Okayama Open 9-Ball
- 2006 San Miguel Asian 9-Ball Tour (Thailand leg)
- 2006 Hokuriku Open 9-Ball
- 2005 Takai Open 9-Ball
- 2003 Tohoku Open 9-Ball
- 1998 JPBA 9-Ball Festival
- 1998 Takai Open 9-Ball
- 1997 Asian 9-Ball Championship
