= Billiard Congress of America =

Cue sports governing body

The Billiard Congress of America (BCA) is the governing body for cue sports in the United States, Canada (CBSA), Mexico (UMCB) and Puerto Rico, and the regional member organization of the World Pool-Billiard Association (WPA). It was established under this name in 1948 as a non-profit trade organization in order to promote the sport and organize its players via tournaments at various levels. The BCA is headquartered in Broomfield, Colorado. The voting members of the organization are mostly equipment manufacturers.

The BCA publishes an annual rule and record book that incorporates the WPA world standardized rules for games such as nine-ball, eight-ball, ten-ball and straight pool, as well as rules for other games that are not presently the subject of international competition, such as cowboy pool, rotation, American snooker, and Chicago among many others. The BCA holds an annual trade show, the International Billiards & Home Recreation Expo. Also annually, it inducts great players, and those who have made great contributions to the sport, into the BCA Hall of Fame.

== History ==
The origins of the BCA began with the National Billiard Association of America (NBAA), founded July 25, 1921. The organization rapidly became the de facto governing body of the sport in the United States, with 35,000 members by 1928, and was closely tied to the Brunswick-Balke-Collender company, a major equipment manufacturer. After a decline in influence in the late 1930s, in part owing to a dispute with world carom billiards champion Willie Hoppe, the NBAA reformed in 1941 as the Billiard Association of America (BAA). Headquartered in Chicago, Illinois, and calling itself "the Governing Body of Billiards", the BAA produced a concise, portable, inexpensive rulebook of carom and pool games that was to serve as the model for future BCA releases. The BAA in turn became the BCA in 1947. The BCA formed with, and for several years shared offices with, the promotional trade association National Billiard Council (NBC), now defunct. Early BCA rulebooks were essentially identical to the 1946 BAA edition, including the cover art and the absence of the increasingly popular game nine-ball from the ruleset. (Nine-ball did not appear until the 1967 edition.) The BCA rulebooks have remained in near-annual continuous publication to the present day.

In 2000, the BCA made the major move of adopting the World Pool-Billiard Association's standardized rules for eight-ball, nine-ball, and other games subject to international professional competition. The BCA had by this time become the national affiliate of the WPA. In the new edition of the rules, the organization expressed a commitment to seeing pool and carom billiards become Olympic sports (and in fact selected Colorado Springs for its new headquarters for proximity to the US Olympic Committee). The rules changes have not been without controversy, as some of them upset US player expectations; various leagues have ignored the new rules and continued with traditional US rules (e.g., in the game of eight-ball, legally pocketing the 8 ball on the break shot has commonly been treated as an instant win).

== BCA Hall of Fame ==
In 1966, the Billiard Congress of America created its hall of fame to honor people who have been known to enrich the sport, containing two categories — "The Greatest Player", a category including players who played either internationally or nationally for 20 years or more and have won at least one national or international championship, and "The Meritorious Service", a category for players that have made "lasting, memorable and important contributions" to billiards.

== International Billiard & Home Recreation Expo ==
The BCA's annual Expo is the largest mostly-cue-sports trade convention in the world, and despite its broad name is primarily focused on pool. It has been held in various locations, most frequently Las Vegas, Nevada, since its founding in 1984. The Expo is exclusively sponsored by the BCA (and its members), and is managed by William T. Glasgow, Inc. of Orland Park, Illinois. The expressed purpose of the event is to "provide industry manufacturers, distributors, retailers, dealers and poolroom operators an annual venue for new business opportunities, including education, new products and networking."

The vast majority of attendees are industry insiders, rather than players. In 2006, 94% were billiard retailers, 5% billiard hall operators, and 1% "other" (e.g. bowling and amusement center operators). In 2009, only 70% were retailers. In that year, 83% were from the United States and 7% from Canada, with the remaining 10% being from elsewhere around the world. While Las Vegas is the most frequent host city for the event, it has also been held in Charlotte, North Carolina, Houston, Texas, Baltimore, Maryland, New Orleans, Louisiana, Kansas City, Missouri, Orlando, Florida, Minneapolis, Minnesota, Nashville, Tennessee, Louisville, Kentucky, and Ft. Worth, Texas.

== Collegiate National Championship ==
The US Collegiate Pocket Billiards National Championship, organized by the Association of College Unions International (ACUI) since 1937, with separate men's and women's divisions since 1939, is recognized and supported by the BCA. The amateur tournament's annual champions are listed in the BCA's Billiards: The Official Rules and Records Book.

== United States Billiard Media Association ==
The United States Billiard Media Association (USBmA) was organized in January 2007 to elect "billiard media members to the Billiard Congress of America's Hall of Fame Board". This media-focused suborganization also lists other goals in its materials, including "elevating the visibility and status of billiards in the media at large" as well as various member-support functions. Membership is strictly limited to "professional print, radio, TV, public relations and Internet media persons who cover cue sports", as determined by the USBmA executive board. As of February 2010, the group listed 33 members, including most of the better-known names in US-based cue sports publishing. USBmA is nominally based in Chicago, Illinois, at the same address as Billiards Digest (Luby Publishing).

== See also ==
- List of professional sports leagues
- BCA Hall of Fame
