= Kuo Po-cheng =

Taiwanese pool player

Kuo Po-Cheng
Personal information
- Nickname: " The Little Monster"
- Born: 15 January 1978 (age 48) New Taipei

Pool career
- Country: Chinese Taipei
- Best finish: Runner-up 2010 WPA World Nine-ball Championship
Medal record
Representing Chinese Taipei
Men's Eight-ball
Asian Games
Gold medal – first place	2010 Guangzhou	Individual

Kuo Po-cheng (Chinese: 郭柏成; pinyin: Guō Bóchéng) (born January 15, 1978) is a Taiwanese professional pool player, nicknamed "the Little Monster". Kuo finished first runner-up to Wu Jia-qing in the 2005 World Nine-ball Championship held in Kaohsiung, Taiwan. He was also runner-up to Francisco Bustamante in the 2010 WPA World Nine-ball Championship held in Doha, Qatar.

== Titles ==
- 2010 Asian Games Eight-ball Singles
