= Mike Davis (pool player) =

American professional pool player

Personal information
- Nickname: "Iron Mike"
- Born: 13 January 1975 (age 51)

Pool career
- Country: United States
- Pool games: 9-Ball
- Current rank: 251

Mike Davis (born January 13, 1975) is an American professional pool player. Davis was a part of the 2006 Mosconi Cup team representing the USA. The event would finish as a draw, with Davis also contributing three wins and three losses.

At the 2011 Dragon 14.1 Tournament, Davis reached the final, however, he lost to Thorsten Hohmann. The final was tight with scores tied at 23-all, before Hohmann ran 102 balls, and eventually won 200–123. On route to the final, Davis defeated Shaun Wilkie 200–133, Earl Herring 200–79, Mike Sigel 200–79, and Charlie Williams 200–166.

== Titles & Achievements ==
- 2013 Ginky Memorial Open 9-Ball
- 2008 Seminole Florida Pro Tour
- 2008 Sands Regency 9-Ball Open
- 2007 Seminole Florida Pro Tour
- 2006 CSI US Bar Table 9-Ball Championship
- 2003 Sands Regency 9-Ball Open
