= Luc Salvas =

Canadian professional pool player (born 1962)

Personal information
- Nickname: Machine Gun
- Born: November 21, 1962 (age 63) Montreal, Quebec, Canada

Pool career
- Country: Canada

Luc Salvas (born November 21, 1962) is a Canadian professional pool player. His quick-paced speed pool play has earned him the nickname "Machine Gun".

Born in Yamaska, Quebec, in 1962, he won the first International Speed Pool Challenge and the US$50,000 winner-take-all purse by defeating Great Britain's Dave Pearson. He returned the next year to defend his title but was defeated in the semi-finals by Bobby McGrath of the United States, the eventual winner of the tournament. In 2009, Salvas returned to play in the same tournament and won it for the second time, defeating Pearson again in the finals. He successfully defended his title in 2010 by defeating McGrath.

Despite his fast performance, he has yet to dominate any of the major nine-ball or eight-ball tournaments.
