= Kunihiko Takahashi =

Japanese pool player

Personal information
- Nickname: "The Sniper"
- Born: 4 March 1969 (age 57) Nagasaki, Japan

Pool career
- Turned pro: 1996
- Pool games: 9-Ball

Tournament wins
- World Champion: 9-Ball (1998)
Medal record
Representing Japan
Men's Eight-Ball
1998 Asian Games
Silver medal – second place	1998 Bangkok	Individual

Kunihiko Takahashi (高橋 邦彦, Takahashi Kunihiko) (born March 4, 1969) is a Japanese professional pool player and a WPA World Nine-ball Champion. Nicknamed "the Sniper".

He began practicing pool at 17 and turned professional in 1996. In 1998, he won the WPA World Nine-ball Championship by defeating the reigning champion, Johnny Archer, in the final match. He became the second World Nine-ball Champion from Japan, after Takeshi Okumura, who won it in 1994. In 1999, Takahashi won the ESPN Ultimate Shootout, earning him US$40,000.

Four years later, Takahashi was three stages away from a second world title when he lost to Earl Strickland, who would later win the championship. Takahashi was critical of the Strickland's behavior during the match: "I lost up here. Strickland shows no sportsmanship. He played very well. But no sportsmanship." Strickland denied the allegation of unsportsmanlike conduct.

== Titles & Achievements ==
- 2013 All Japan 14.1 Championship
- 2011 All Japan 14.1 Championship
- 2009 Shikoku 9-Ball Open
- 2005 All Japan 14.1 Championship
- 2005 Hokuriku 9-Ball Open
- 2004 Hokuriku 9-Ball Open
- 2003 Hokuriku 9-Ball Open
- 2002 All Japan 14.1 Championship
- 2001 Tohoku 9-Ball Open
- 2000 Hokkaido 9-Ball Open
- 2000 Hokuriku 9-Ball Open
- 1999 Kansai 9-Ball Open
- 1999 ESPN Ultimate Champions Shootout
- 1999 Hokuriku 9-Ball Open
- 1998 WPA World Nine-ball Championship
- 1997 All Japan Championship 9-Ball
- 1996 Japan Open 9-Ball
