= WPA World Nine-ball Championship =

World Championship in pool, played in Nine-ball

- Current season, competition or edition: 2025 WPA World Nine-ball Championship
- Sport: Pool
- Founded: 1990
- Founder: World Pool Association
- Most recent champion: (Philippines) Carlo Biado (2025)
- Related competitions: Eight-ball, Ten-ball, Heyball
- Website: matchroompool.com

The WPA World Nine-ball Championship is an annual professional nine-ball pool tournament contested since 1990. The championship is sanctioned by the World Pool Association (WPA) and principally sponsored and organized by Matchroom Sport, who promote the event as the World Pool Championship. The championship has men's, women's, youth and wheelchair divisions.

== History ==
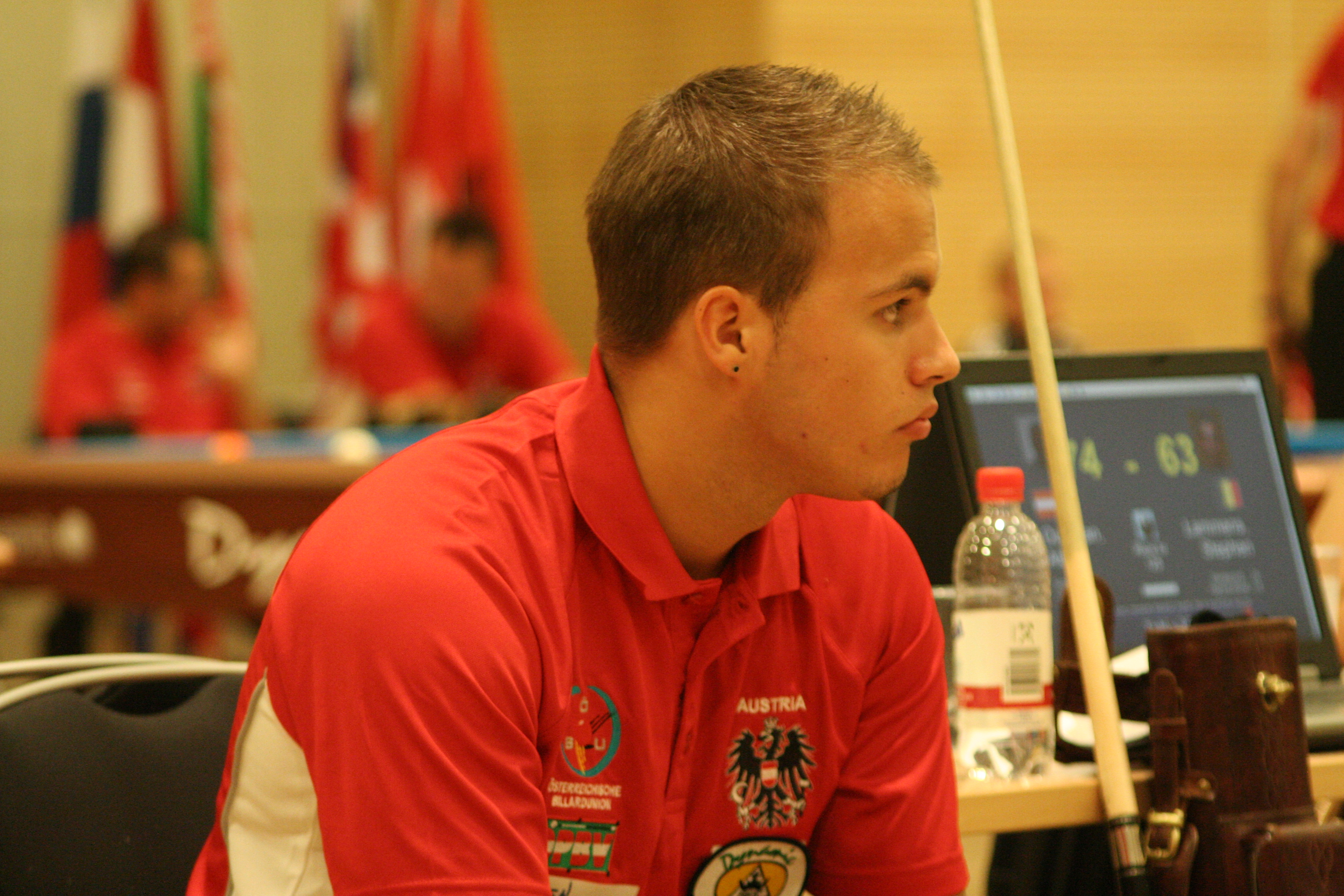
Two-time champion Albin Ouschan

In the summer of 1989, the World Pool-Billiard Association (now the World Pool Association or WPA) began plans for a world championship tournament. They created a provisional Board to oversee the creation of a tournament. The event was one of the first time the world's top nine-ball players met in a competition. The inaugural WPA World Nine-ball Championship was held in Bergheim, Germany. A men's event contested between 32 players was won by Earl Strickland and a 16-player women's event won by Robin Bell. A junior's event was first played in 1992, won by Hsia Hui-kai and a wheelchair event was created in 1999 first won by Bob Calderon. The event was organised solely by the WPA from this inauguration through 1999.

In July 1999, Matchroom Sport attempted to get involved with the organisation of the event, but their bid failed. The 1999 event was played in Alicante, Spain, and won by Nick Varner. Broadcast on ESPN, it was the first pro nine-ball championship to be televised. Matchroom Sport, meanwhile, instead organised a new tournament called the "World Professional Pool Championship", a competing event in Cardiff, Wales, which was won by Efren Reyes and broadcast on Sky Sports. With the World Professional Pool Championship being successful, the WPA and Matchroom agreed to merge their two tournaments, with both 1999 events being considered as official world championships. Matchroom continued to promote and organise the event until 2007 when it was not held after they were unable to fund it due to the 2008 financial crisis.

For the 2001 event, the number of competitors in the men's division was increased to 128 and a men's division first prize raised to $65,000 from $17,500. The event stayed in Wales until 2003. The prize money continued to increase. The 2004 and 2005 events were held in Taiwan, with a men's division first prize of $75,000. The pockets on the tables were narrowed, to make the game more difficult. The tournament moved to the Philippines in 2006 and 2007. the event ran from 3–11 November, and Daryl Peach of the England was the victor.

After a two-year hiatus, the tournament returned being organised by the WPA as the 2010 WPA World Nine-ball Championship in Doha, Qatar. The event was then held annually in Doha through 2019. Prize money had reduced, with the winner's prize being $36,000, only rising to $40,000 by 2018. After not being contested in 2020 due to the COVID-19 pandemic, the championship resumed in 2021 in Milton Keynes, England. The 2022 edition was 6–10 April in Milton Keynes.

== Winners ==
| Year | Dates | Location | Winner | Runner-up | Final score |
|---|---|---|---|---|---|
| 1990 | 3–7 March | Bergheim, West Germany | (United States) Earl Strickland | (United States) Jeff Carter | 3–1 (sets) |
| 1991 | 29 May – 5 June | Las Vegas, United States | (United States) Earl Strickland (2) | (United States) Nick Varner | 9–7 |
| 1992 | 1–5 April | Taipei, Taiwan | (United States) Johnny Archer | (United States) Bobby Hunter | 13–12 |
| 1993 | 7–12 December | Königswinter, Germany | (Chinese Taipei) Chao Fong-pang | (Germany) Thomas Hasch | 2–0 (sets) |
| 1994 | 2–6 November | Chicago, United States | (Japan) Takeshi Okumura | (Japan) Yasunari Itsuzaki | 9–6 |
| 1995 | 15–19 November | Taipei, Taiwan | (Germany) Oliver Ortmann | (United States) Dallas West | 11–9 |
| 1996 | 23–27 October | Borlänge, Sweden | (Germany) Ralf Souquet | (Sweden) Tom Storm | 11–1 |
| 1997 | 1–5 October | Chicago, United States | (United States) Johnny Archer (2) | (Chinese Taipei) Lee Kun-fang | 9–3 |
| 1998 | 11–15 November | Taipei, Taiwan | (Japan) Kunihiko Takahashi | (United States) Johnny Archer | 13–3 |
| 1999 | 18–26 July | Cardiff, Wales | (Philippines) Efren Reyes | (Chinese Taipei) Chang Hao-ping | 17–8 |
| 1999 | 5–12 December | Alicante, Spain | (United States) Nick Varner | (United States) Jeremy Jones | 13–8 |
| 2000 | 1–9 July | Cardiff, Wales | (Chinese Taipei) Chao Fong-pang (2) | (Mexico) Ismael Páez | 17–6 |
| 2001 | 14–22 July | Cardiff, Wales | (Finland) Mika Immonen | (Germany) Ralf Souquet | 17–10 |
| 2002 | 13–21 July | Cardiff, Wales | (United States) Earl Strickland (3) | (Philippines) Francisco Bustamante | 17–15 |
| 2003 | 12–20 July | Cardiff, Wales | (Germany) Thorsten Hohmann | (Canada) Alex Pagulayan | 17–10 |
| 2004 | 10–18 July | Taipei, Taiwan | (Canada) Alex Pagulayan | (Chinese Taipei) Chang Pei-wei | 17–13 |
| 2005 | 2–10 July | Kaohsiung, Taiwan | (Chinese Taipei) Wu Jia-qing | (Chinese Taipei) Kuo Po-cheng | 17–16 |
| 2006 | 4–12 November | Pasay, Philippines | (Philippines) Ronato Alcano | (Germany) Ralf Souquet | 17–11 |
| 2007 | 3–11 November | Quezon City, Philippines | (England) Daryl Peach | (Philippines) Roberto Gomez | 17–15 |
| 2008 | Not held due to the 2008 financial crisis | | | | |
| 2009 | Not held due to the 2008 financial crisis | | | | |
| 2010 | 29 June – 5 July | Doha, Qatar | (Philippines) Francisco Bustamante | (Chinese Taipei) Kuo Po-cheng | 13–7 |
| 2011 | 25 June – 1 July | Doha, Qatar | (Japan) Yukio Akakariyama | (Philippines) Ronato Alcano | 13–11 |
| 2012 | 22–29 June | Doha, Qatar | (England) Darren Appleton | (China) Li Hewen | 13–12 |
| 2013 | 2–13 September | Doha, Qatar | (Germany) Thorsten Hohmann (2) | (Philippines) Antonio Gabica | 13–7 |
| 2014 | 16–27 June | Doha, Qatar | (Netherlands) Niels Feijen | (Austria) Albin Ouschan | 13–10 |
| 2015 | 7–18 September | Doha, Qatar | (Chinese Taipei) Ko Pin-yi | (United States) Shane Van Boening | 13–11 |
| 2016 | 1–4 August | Doha, Qatar | (Austria) Albin Ouschan | (United States) Shane Van Boening | 13–6 |
| 2017 | 5–14 December | Doha, Qatar | (Philippines) Carlo Biado | (Philippines) Roland Garcia | 13–5 |
| 2018 | 10–20 December | Doha, Qatar | (Germany) Joshua Filler | (Philippines) Carlo Biado | 13–10 |
| 2019 | 13–17 December | Doha, Qatar | (Russia) Fedor Gorst | (Chinese Taipei) Chang Jung-lin | 13–11 |
| 2020 | Not held due to the COVID-19 pandemic | | | | |
| 2021 | 6–10 June | Milton Keynes, England | (Austria) Albin Ouschan (2) | (Kuwait) Omar Al-Shaheen | 13–9 |
| 2022 | 6–10 April | Milton Keynes, England | (United States) Shane Van Boening | (Austria) Albin Ouschan | 13–6 |
| 2023 | 1–5 February | Kielce, Poland | (Spain) Francisco Sánchez Ruiz | (Syria) Mohammad Soufi | 13–10 |
| 2024 | 3–8 June | Jeddah, Saudi Arabia | (United States) Fedor Gorst (2) | (Albania) Eklent Kaçi | 15–14 |
| 2025 | 21–26 July | Jeddah, Saudi Arabia | (Philippines) Carlo Biado (2) | (United States) Fedor Gorst | 15–13 |
| 2027 | 5–10 April | Bahrain | | | |

=== Records ===
- Earl Strickland holds the record for winning the WPA World Nine-ball Championship the most times with three. (1990, 1991, 2002). He also holds the record for the most consecutive wins with two. (1990, 1991).
- Albin Ouschan holds the record for the most final appearances with four. (2014, 2016, 2021, 2022).
- The oldest pool player to ever win the tournament to date is Nick Varner of the United States, at 51 years old at the time of his victory, The youngest is Wu Jia-qing of Chinese Taipei, aged 16 years old at the time of his victory.

== Top performers ==
| Name | Nationality | Winner | Runner-up | Finals | Semi-final or better | Final stage appearances |
|---|---|---|---|---|---|---|
| Earl Strickland | United States | 3 | 0 | 3 | 5 | 6 |
| **Albin Ouschan** | Austria | 2 | 2 | 4 | 4 | 8 |
| Johnny Archer | United States | 2 | 1 | 3 | 5 | 10 |
| **Carlo Biado** | Philippines | 2 | 1 | 3 | 4 | 7 |
| **Fedor Gorst** | United States | 2 | 1 | 2 | 3 | 3 |
| Chao Fong-pang | Chinese Taipei | 2 | 0 | 2 | 3 | 5 |
| **Thorsten Hohmann** | Germany | 2 | 0 | 2 | 2 | 6 |
| **Ralf Souquet** | Germany | 1 | 2 | 3 | 6 | 11 |
| **Shane Van Boening** | United States | 1 | 2 | 3 | 4 | 9 |
| Alex Pagulayan | Canada | 1 | 1 | 2 | 3 | 7 |
| Francisco Bustamante | Philippines | 1 | 1 | 2 | 3 | 7 |
| Nick Varner | United States | 1 | 1 | 2 | 3 | 3 |
| Ronato Alcano | Philippines | 1 | 1 | 2 | 2 | 3 |
| Efren Reyes | Philippines | 1 | 0 | 1 | 2 | 7 |
| Takeshi Okumura | Japan | 1 | 0 | 1 | 2 | 5 |
| Wu Jia-qing | China | 1 | 0 | 1 | 2 | 5 |
| **Francisco Sánchez Ruiz** | Spain | 1 | 0 | 1 | 2 | 4 |
| **Ko Pin-yi** | Chinese Taipei | 1 | 0 | 1 | 1 | 9 |
| **Mika Immonen** | Finland | 1 | 0 | 1 | 1 | 9 |
| Oliver Ortmann | Germany | 1 | 0 | 1 | 1 | 6 |
| Kunihiko Takahashi | Japan | 1 | 0 | 1 | 1 | 5 |
| Niels Feijen | Netherlands | 1 | 0 | 1 | 1 | 5 |
| Darren Appleton | England | 1 | 0 | 1 | 1 | 4 |
| **Joshua Filler** | Germany | 1 | 0 | 1 | 1 | 4 |
| Daryl Peach | England | 1 | 0 | 1 | 1 | 3 |
| Yukio Akakariyama | Japan | 1 | 0 | 1 | 1 | 1 |
| Kuo Po-cheng | Chinese Taipei | 0 | 2 | 2 | 3 | 5 |
| Lee Kun-fang | Chinese Taipei | 0 | 1 | 1 | 2 | 4 |
| **Eklent Kaçi** | Albania | 0 | 1 | 1 | 2 | 2 |
| Tom Storm | Sweden | 0 | 1 | 1 | 2 | 4 |
| Chang Jung-lin | Chinese Taipei | 0 | 1 | 1 | 1 | 4 |
| Dallas West | United States | 0 | 1 | 1 | 1 | 4 |
| Jeremy Jones | United States | 0 | 1 | 1 | 1 | 4 |
| Antonio Gabica | Philippines | 0 | 1 | 1 | 1 | 3 |
| Omar Al-Shaheen | Kuwait | 0 | 1 | 1 | 1 | 3 |
| Chang Hao-ping | Chinese Taipei | 0 | 1 | 1 | 1 | 2 |
| **Mohammad Soufi** | Syria | 0 | 1 | 1 | 1 | 2 |
| Li Hewen | China | 0 | 1 | 1 | 1 | 2 |
| Roberto Gomez | Philippines | 0 | 1 | 1 | 1 | 2 |
| Bobby Hunter | United States | 0 | 1 | 1 | 1 | 1 |
| Chang Pei-wei | Chinese Taipei | 0 | 1 | 1 | 1 | 1 |
| Ismael Páez | Mexico | 0 | 1 | 1 | 1 | 1 |
| Jeff Carter | United States | 0 | 1 | 1 | 1 | 1 |
| **Roland Garcia** | Philippines | 0 | 1 | 1 | 1 | 1 |
| Thomas Hasch | Germany | 0 | 1 | 1 | 1 | 1 |
| Yasunari Itsuzaki | Japan | 0 | 1 | 1 | 1 | 1 |

- Active participants are shown in **bold**.
- Only players who reached the final are included.
- Final stage appearances relates to players who reach the last 16 players of the event.
- In the event of identical records, players are sorted in alphabetical order by first name.
