= IEPF World Eightball Championship =

World pool championship, began 1993

The IEPF World Eightball Pool Championship is a pool world championship organised by the International Eightball Pool Federation (formerly called the World Eightball Pool Federation) for the British-originating version of eightball pool. The competition has taken place annually since 1993.

The most successful player in the men's singles is the English player Mick Hill, who won the World Champion title six times and has been runner-up twice. His compatriot Gareth Potts has been World Champion three times and runner-up once.

In the Ladies competition, Scotland's Sue Thompson is the most successful player with eleven titles. Linda Leadbitter from England amd Emma Cunningham from Northern Ireland have won 4 times whileAmy Beauchamp from England has won the event on three occasions.

== History ==
=== Men's ===
Year	Location	Winner	Score	Runner-up
1993	(England) Manchester	(England) Kevin Wright	8 : 4	(Wales) Nigel Davis
1994	(England) Manchester	(Wales) Rob McKenna (1)	9 : 3	(Republic of Ireland) Greg Farren
1995	(England) Chorley	(England) Daz Ward	11 : 8	(England) Jason Twist
1996	(England) Manchester	(Republic of Ireland) Greg Farren	11 : 10	(Republic of Ireland) Tony Holgate
1997	(England) Manchester	(Wales) Rob McKenna (2)	11 : 9	(England) Lee Kendall
1998	(England) Blackpool	(England) Carl Morris	11 : 5	(England) Keith Brewer
1999	(England) Blackpool	(Australia) Quinten Hann	11 : 4	(England) Terry Hunt
2000	(England) Blackpool	(England) Jason Twist (1)	11 : 10	(England) Carl Morris
2001	(England) Blackpool	(England) Chris Melling (1)	11 : 10	(Wales) Rob McKenna
2002	(England) Blackpool	(England) Jason Twist (2)	11 : 9	(France) Yannick Beaufils
2003	(England) Blackpool	(England) Chris Melling (2)	11 : 7	(England) Jason Twist
2004	(England) Blackpool	(England) Mick Hill (1)	11 : 9	(England) Darren Appleton
2005	(England) Blackpool	(England) Gareth Potts (1)	11 : 7	(England) Chris Melling
2006	(England) Blackpool	(England) Mark Selby	11 : 7	(England) Darren Appleton
2007	(England) Blackpool	(England) Gareth Potts (2)	11 : 5	(England) Mick Hill
2008	(England) Blackpool	(England) Gareth Potts (3)	11 : 4	(England) Jason Twist
2009	(England) Blackpool	(England) Phil Harrison	11 : 7	(England) Mick Hill
2010	(England) Blackpool	(England) Mick Hill (2)	11 : 8	(England) Gareth Potts
2011	(England) Blackpool	(England) Adam Davis	11 : 9	(England) Phil Harrison
2012	(England) Blackpool	(England) John Roe	11 : 7	(England) Lee Kendall
2013	(England) Blackpool	(Wales) Tom Cousins (1)	11 : 10	(England) Craig Waddingham
2014	(England) Blackpool	(Wales) Tom Cousins (2)	11 : 7	(England) Giuseppe d’Imperio
2015	(England) Blackpool	(England) Mick Hill (3)	11 : 5	(England) Nigel Clarke
2016	(England) Blackpool	(England) Shaun Chipperfield	11 : 4	(England) Karl Sutton
2017	(England) Blackpool	(England) Mick Hill (4)	11 : 6	(England) Phil Harrison
2018	(England) Blackpool	(England) Mick Hill (5)	11 : 8	(England) Phil Harrison
2019	(England) Blackpool	(England) Mick Hill (6)	11 : 6	(England) Dom Cooney
2022	(Ireland) Killarney	(Northern Ireland) Ronan McCarthy	11 : 6	(England) Chris Day
2023	(Morocco) Agadir	(Malta) Clayton Castaldi	11 : 9	(England) Josh Kane
2024	(England) Blackpool	(Northern Ireland) Ronan McCarthy	11 : 9	(England) Karl Sutton
2025	(Ireland) Ennis	(England) Giuseppe D'Imperio	11 : 8	(Northern Ireland) Declan Brennan
2026	(Morocco) Marrakesh			

==== Ranking ====
Rank	Winner	Titles	Runner-up
1	(England) Mick Hill	6	2
2	(England) Gareth Potts	3	1
3	(England) Jason Twist	2	3
4	(Wales) Rob McKenna	2	1
4	(England) Chris Melling	2	1
6	(Wales) Tom Cousins	2	0
6	(Northern Ireland) Ronan McCarthy	2	0
8	(England) Phil Harrison	1	3
9	(England) Carl Morris	1	1
10	(England) Shaun Chipperfield	1	0
10	(England) Adam Davis	1	0
10	(Republic of Ireland) Greg Farren	1	0
10	(Australia) Quinten Hann	1	0
10	(England) John Roe	1	0
10	(England) Mark Selby	1	0
10	(England) Daz Ward	1	0
10	(England) Kevin Wright	1	0
10	(Malta) Clayton Castaldi	1	0
10	(England) Giuseppe D'Imperio	1	0

=== Women's ===
Source WEPF Roll of Honour

Year	Location	Winner	Score	Runner-up
1993	(England) Manchester	(England) Linda Moffat (1)	6:1	(Australia) Natalie Froling
1994	(England) Manchester	(England) Linda Leadbitter (nee Moffat) (2)	6:3	(Scotland) Sue Thompson
1995	(England) Chorley	(England) Linda Leadbitter (3)	7:3	(Scotland) Sue Thompson
1996	(England) Manchester	(Scotland) Sue Thompson (1)	7:1	(France) Rosalia Diliberto
1997	(England) Manchester	(Scotland) Sue Thompson (2)	8:5	(England) Linda Leadbitter
1998	(England) Blackpool	(England) Linda Leadbitter (4)	8:6	(Scotland) Sue Thompson
1999	(England) Blackpool	(England) Lisa Quick (1)	8:3	(England) Linda Leadbitter
2000	(England) Blackpool	(Scotland) Sue Thompson (3)	8:5	(England) Linda Leadbitter
2001	(England) Blackpool	(England) Lisa Quick (2)	8:6	(England) Linda Leadbitter
2002	(England) Blackpool	(Scotland) Sue Thompson (4)	8:3	(England) Lisa Quick
2003	(England) Blackpool	(Scotland) Sue Thompson (5)	8:3	(England) Lisa Quick
2004	(England) Blackpool	(Scotland) Sue Thompson (6)	8:2	(Northern Ireland) Emma Cunningham
2005	(England) Blackpool	(Northern Ireland) Emma Cunningham (1)	8:5	(Scotland) Sue Thompson
2006	(England) Blackpool	(Scotland) Sue Thompson (7)	8:6	(Northern Ireland) Emma Cunningham
2007	(England) Blackpool	(Scotland) Sue Thompson (8)	8:3	(Northern Ireland) Emma Cunningham
2008	(England) Blackpool	(Scotland) Lynette Horsburgh	8:6	(England) Barbara Taylor
2009	(England) Blackpool	(Scotland) Sue Thompson (9)	8:6	(Northern Ireland) Emma Cunningham
2010	(England) Blackpool	(Scotland) Sue Thompson (10)	8:4	(Northern Ireland) Emma Cunningham
2011	(England) Blackpool	(Northern Ireland) Emma Cunningham (2)	8:2	(Australia) Renata Delahunty
2012	(England) Blackpool	(Scotland) Sue Thompson (11)	8:3	(England) Sharon Wright
2013	(England) Blackpool	(Northern Ireland) Emma Cunningham (3)	8:4	(England) Barbara Taylor
2014	(England) Blackpool	(Wales) Kirsty Davies	8:6	(England) Emma Wilkinson
2015	(England) Blackpool	(England) Amy Beauchamp (1)	8:4	(England) Emma Wilkinson
2016	(England) Blackpool	(France) Sabrilla Brunet	8:4	(England) Amy Beauchamp
2017	(England) Blackpool	(England) Amy Beauchamp (2)	8:1	(England) Kerry Griffiths
2018	(England) Blackpool	(England) Barbara Taylor	8:7	(England) Sharon James
2019	(England) Blackpool	(England) Amy Beauchamp (3)	8:5	(England) Sharon James
2022	(Ireland) Killarney	(England) Barbara Taylor (2)	8:5	(Wales) Sarah Coxon
2023	(Morocco) Agadir	(France) Marion Jude (1)	8:6	(England) Harriet Haynes
2024	(England) Blackpool	(South Africa) Tasneem Solomons (1)	8:7	(Wales) Kirsty-Lee Davies
2025	(Ireland) Ennis	(Northern Ireland) Emma Cunningham (4)	8:6	(France) Colette Henrikson
2026	(Morocco) Marrakesh			

==== Ranking ====
Rank	Winner	Titles	Runner-up
1	(Scotland) Sue Thompson	11	4
2	(Northern Ireland) Emma Cunningham	4	5
3	(England) Linda Leadbitter	4	4
4	(England) Amy Beauchamp	3	1
5	(England) Lisa Quick	2	2
5	(England) Barbara Taylor	2	2
7	(Wales) Kirsty Davies	1	1
8	(Scotland) Lynette Horsburgh	1	0
8	(France) Sabrilla Brunet	1	0
8	(France) Marion Jude	1	0
8	(South Africa) Tasneem Solomons	1	0

=== Junior ===
(U20 for 2022 due to COVID-19)

Year	Location	Winner	Score	Runner-up
1994	(England) Manchester	(Scotland) Derek Murphy		Unknown
1995	(England) Chorley	(Australia) Mathew Franceschini		Unknown
1996	(England) Manchester	(Australia) Ben Crawley		Unknown
1997	(England) Manchester	(England) Chris Melling		Unknown
1998	(England) Blackpool	(England) Kurt Morris		Unknown
1999	(England) Blackpool	(England) Tim Singh		Unknown
2000	(England) Blackpool	(England) Gareth Potts		Unknown
2001	(England) Blackpool	(Scotland) Darren Matthew	7:3	(Wales) Marcus Phillips
2002	(England) Blackpool	(Scotland) Darren Matthew	7:5	(Northern Ireland) Gary Clark
2003	(England) Blackpool	(Scotland) Darren Matthew	7:3	(Northern Ireland) Thomas Morrow
2004	(England) Blackpool	(England) Jordan Church	7:3	(England) Richard Twomey
2005	(England) Blackpool	(England) Jordan Church	7:4	(Republic of Ireland) Stephen Dempsey
2006	(England) Blackpool	(Scotland) Pat McCarron	8:4	(England) Sam Jeffrey
2007	(England) Blackpool	(Republic of Ireland) Sean Conway		Unknown
2008	(England) Blackpool	(England) Paul McGuire		Unknown
2009	(England) Blackpool	(England) Ben Clark		Unknown
2010	(England) Blackpool	(England) Frank Costello		Unknown
2011	(England) Blackpool	(England) Frank Costello	8:5	(England) Joe O’Connor
2012	(England) Blackpool	(England) Joe O’Connor	8:7	(England) Callum Singleton
2013	(England) Blackpool	(Northern Ireland) Carl Martin	8:7	(England) Joe O’Connor
2014	(England) Blackpool	(Northern Ireland) Carl Martin	8:5	(Republic of Ireland) Adam Maher
2015	(England) Blackpool	(England) Aaron Davies	8:4	(England) Nathan Ellis
2016	(England) Blackpool	(Australia) Matthew Curwood	8:6	(Malta) Scott Muscat
2017	(England) Blackpool	(Republic of Ireland) Cormac Kerr	8:6	(Republic of Ireland) Ben Doyle
2018	(England) Blackpool	(England) Luke Gilbert	8:4	(Northern Ireland) Karol Galka
2019	(England) Blackpool	(England) Danyal Hussain	8:4	(Northern Ireland) Lee McCutcheon
2022	(Ireland) Killarney	(England) Evan Plummer	8:2	(Northern Ireland) Piotr Samulewicz
2023	(Morocco) Agadir	(Australia) Toby Clack	8:5	(Australia) Joshua Hands
2024	(England) Blackpool	(England) Jaden Billingham	8:2	(Ireland) Cillian Smyth
2025	(Ireland) Ennis	(England) Jaden Billingham	8:4	(South Africa) Cassiem Abrahams
2026	(Morocco) Marrakesh			

==== Ranking ====
Rank	Winner	Titles
1	(Scotland) Darren Matthew	3
2	(England) Jordan Church	2
2	(England) Frank Costello	2
2	(Northern Ireland) Carl Martin	2
2	(England) Jaden Billingham	2

=== U-23 ===
(until 2014 U-21 ) (For 2022 U-25 due to COVID-19)

Year	Location	Winner	Score	Runner-up
2011	(England) Blackpool	(England) Ashley Radford	8:7	(Scotland) Ryan Fleming
2012	(England) Blackpool	(Scotland) Ryan Davie	8:6	(England) Glen Hannibal
2013	(England) Blackpool	(England) Michael Hope	8:2	(England) Giuseppe d’Imperio
2014	(England) Blackpool	(England) Giuseppe d’Imperio	8:7	(Morocco) Amine Amiri
2015	(England) Blackpool	(Wales) Ben Fortey	8:6	(England) Luke Bowry
2016	(England) Blackpool	(England) Giuseppe d’Imperio	8:4	(England) Aaron Davies
2017	(England) Blackpool	(England) Callum Singleton	8:7	(England) Craig Lauder
2018	(England) Blackpool	(Republic of Ireland) Cormac Kerr	8:4	(England) Jack Smithers
2019	(England) Blackpool	(England) Luke Gilbert	8:7	(Ireland) Jordan Synnott
2022	(Ireland) Killarney	(Malta) Scott Muscat	8:7	(England) Luke Gilbert
2023	(Morocco) Agadir	(England) Luke Gilbert	8:4	(England) Jack Schofield
2024	(England) Blackpool	(England) Joshua Traynor	8:4	(England) Luke Cronin
2025	(Ireland) Ennis	(Ireland) Sean Walsh	8:6	(Australia) Sean Dempsey
2026	(Morocco) Marrakesh			

==== Ranking ====
Rank	Winner	Titles	Runner-up
1	(England) Giuseppe d’Imperio	2	1
1	(England) Luke Gilbert	2	1
3	(Scotland) Ryan Davie	1	0
3	(Wales) Ben Fortey	1	0
3	(England) Michael Hope	1	0
3	(Republic of Ireland) Cormac Kerr	1	0
3	(England) Ashley Radford	1	0
3	(England) Callum Singleton	1	0
3	(Malta) Scott Muscat	1	0
3	(England) Joshua Traynor	1	0
3	(Ireland) Sean Walsh	1	0

=== Senior's ===
Year	Location	Winner	Score	Runner-up
2011	(England) Blackpool	(England) Tony Kay	8:6	(Australia) Terry Bond
2012	(England) Blackpool	(England) Keith Brewer	8:0	(England) Peter Golding
2013	(England) Blackpool	(Australia) Stacey Vine	8:2	(Australia) Don Colbert
2014	(England) Blackpool	(England) Keith Brewer	8:3	(Australia) Steven Gray
2015	(England) Blackpool	(Australia) Steven Gray	8:6	(England) Keith Brewer
2016	(England) Blackpool	(England) Keith Brewer	8:1	(Malta) Marcel Micallef
2017	(England) Blackpool	(England) Steve Chambers	8:6	(England) Shaun Eaton-Lees
2018	(England) Blackpool	(Malta) Christ Mills	8:5	(England) Pat Ward
2019	(England) Blackpool	(Scotland) James Pheely	8:3	(India) Videsh Sabharwal
2022	(Ireland) Killarney	(England) Keith Brewer	8:2	(England) Pat Ward
2023	(Morocco) Agadir	(Northern Ireland) Paddy Clarke	8:4	(India) Sanjay Patel
2024	(England) Blackpool	(Australia) Stacey Vine	8:5	(Ireland) Derek Smyth
2025	(Ireland) Ennis	(England) Eddie Barker	8:5	(Ireland) Lee Kendall
2026	(Morocco) Marrakesh			

==== Ranking ====
Rank	Winner	Titles	Runner-up
1	(England) Keith Brewer	4	1
2	(Australia) Stacey Vine	2	0
3	(Australia) Steven Gray	1	1
4	(England) Steve Chambers	1	0
4	(England) Tony Kay	1	0
4	(Malta) Christ Mills	1	0
4	(Scotland) James Pheely	1	0
4	(Northern Ireland) Paddy Clarke	1	0
4	(England) Eddie Barker	1	0

=== Wheelchair ===
Year	Location	Winner	Score	Runner-up
2008	(England) Blackpool	(England) Tony Southern	5:4	(England) Frankie Gillen
2009	(England) Blackpool	Unknown		Unknown
2010	(England) Blackpool	Unknown		Unknown
2011	(England) Blackpool	Unknown		Unknown
2012	(England) Blackpool	Unknown		Unknown
2013	(England) Blackpool	(India) Aslam Abubaker	5:1	(Australia) Stephen Pettinato
2014	(England) Blackpool	(England) Dave Beaumont	5:0	(England) Theresa Sheridan
2015	(England) Blackpool	(England) Dave Beaumont	5:4	(South Africa) Ryan Kisten
2016	(England) Blackpool	(India) Aslam Abubaker	5:2	(England) Dave Beaumont
2017	(England) Blackpool	(India) Aslam Abubaker	5:1	(England) Dave Beaumont
2018	(England) Blackpool	(England) Dave Beaumont	5:3	(India) Aslam Abubaker
2019	(England) Blackpool	(India) Aslam Abubaker	5:4	(England) Dave Beaumont
2022	(Ireland) Killarney	(England) Roy Kimberley	5:4	(England) Dave Beaumont
2025	(Ireland) Ennis	(Ireland) Eddie MaGowan	5:3	(England) Kevin Flynn
2026	(Morocco) Marrakesh			

==== Ranking ====
Rank	Winner	Titles
1	(India) Aslam Abubaker	4
1	(England) Dave Beaumont	4
2	(England) Tony Southern	1
2	(England) Roy Kimberley	1
2	(Ireland) Eddie MaGowan	1

=== Over 60's ===
Year	Location	Winner	Score	Runner-up
2022	(Ireland) Killarney	(England) Nick Burton	7:5	(Ireland) Michael Fortune
2023	(Morocco) Agadir	(England) Paul Waterfield	7:3	(England) Nick Burton
2024	(England) Blackpool	(England) Will Doidge	7:5	(England) Derek Tolliday
2025	(Ireland) Ennis	(Wales) Russell Burgess	7:5	(Ireland) Joe Connolly
2026	(Morocco) Marrakesh			

==== Ranking ====
Rank	Winner	Titles
1	(England) Nick Burton	1
1	(England) Paul Waterfield	1
1	(England) Will Doidge	1
1	(Wales) Russell Burgess	1
