= Mick Hill (pool player) =

English pool player

Personal information
- Nickname: The Machine
- Born: 7 April 1980 (age 46) Dudley, England, UK

Pool career
- Country: England
- Pool games: British-style eight-ball (B8B); Chinese eight-ball (C8B)

Tournament wins
- World Champion: 6-time WEPF World Eightball champion

Michael Hill, commonly known as Mick Hill, is an English pool player. He was WEPF men's world champion of British eight-ball pool in 2004, 2010, 2015, 2017, 2018, and 2019, the first person to win it six times. Frequently described as a genius by his peers, he is one of the most successful players of the sport in his generation and is regarded as one of the best players of all time.

== Career ==
Mick Hill started his pool life based in Dudley in the West Midlands. He was selected for the English Junior team for the European Championships (EPBF) held in Nurnberg, Germany, from 4 to 11 August 1996 along with Darren Heggie (Blackburn) and Chris Melling, with Bob Love (London) as their Manager from the English Pool Association. The England Junior team won a commendable Bronze Medal (Double Eliminator) losing to Germany 2–1 in the semi-final having defeated Switzerland 2–1, losing to Finland 3–0, defeating Denmark 3–0, Belgium 3-0 and Austria 2–1.

Mick Hill was playing County pool for West Midlands before embarking upon an England Men's career, qualifying through the England Team trials in March 1998 at Attleborough Pool & Snooker Club, Norfolk.

=== WEPF World Eightball Championship ===
In 2004, Mick won his first WEPF World Eightball Championship, beating Darren Appleton in the final.

In July 2010 Mick won his second title, beating the then World Number 1 Gareth Potts 11–8 in the final at the Imperial Hotel, Blackpool.

In July 2015 Mick played Nigel Clarke in the World Eightball Pool Finals. Mick won 11-5 winning his third title.

In 2017 Mick beat Tom Cousins, twice champion, in the semis. He then beat former champion Phil Harrison 11–6 in the final to be the first person to win the title four times.

In 2018, Mick beat Phil Harrison 11–8 in the final again to be the first person to win the title five times.

In 2019, Mick Hill won a sixth world title, beating Dominic Cooney in the final.

=== Other competitions ===
Hill won the Dumbuck Blackball Rules Vegas Challenge in 2014, held in Dumbarton, Scotland. He also played in the Dumbuck Blackball Rules Vegas Challenge at the end of 2015. Mick (the 2015 world rules champion) met Jack Whelan (the 2015 blackball world champion) in the final and won 23–20, for consecutive victories.

He delved into Chinese 8 Ball entering the 2016 WPA World Chinese Heyball Championship in Yushan County, China. Mick borrowed a cue and had one week of practice before reaching the final, only succumbing to China's Shi Hanqing by the odd frame of an epic battle.

He plays both the main disciplines of pool (Blackball and Eightball World Rules) competitively. The Supreme Pool series, notably the Strachan Cup, pitches the best players of both IPA Blackball and Eightball together in one series of tournaments. Mick reached the final in 2018 but has not won yet.

== Achievements ==
- 2004 WEPF World Eightball Championship
- 2010 WEPF World Eightball Championship
- 2014 Dumbuck Blackball Rules Vegas Challenge
- 2015 WEPF World Eightball Championship
- 2015 Dumbuck Blackball Rules Vegas Challenge
- 2017 WEPF World Eightball Championship
- 2018 WEPF World Eightball Championship
- 2019 WEPF World Eightball Championship
- 2022 Ultimate Pool Series Championship
