= List of world eight-ball champions =

Professional world champions in eight-ball pool and its variations include:

== American-style ==
This section lists world champions in the internationally standardized game ("American-style") of eight-ball, as played by professionals around the world. This is played on the 9-foot pool tables with colored, numbered balls.

=== WPA World Eight-ball Championship ===
The following is a list of WPA world eight-ball champions sanctioned by the World Pool Association (WPA).

Year	Location	Winner	Nationality	Runner-up	Nationality
2026	United States	Aloysius Yapp	Singapore	Francisco Sánchez Ruiz	Spain
2025	Bali	Albin Ouschan	Austria	Alexander Kazakis	Greece
2024	New Zealand	Joshua Filler	Germany	Hsu Jui-an	Chinese Taipei
2023	Austria	Shane Van Boening	United States	Sanjin Pehlivanović	Bosnia and Herzegovina
2022	Puerto Rico	Francisco Sánchez Ruiz	Spain	Wiktor Zielinski	Poland
2012	United Arab Emirates	Chang Jung-lin	Chinese Taipei	Fu Che-wei	Chinese Taipei
2011	United Arab Emirates	Dennis Orcollo	Philippines	Niels Feijen	Netherlands
2010	United Arab Emirates	Karl Boyes	England	Niels Feijen	Netherlands
2008	United Arab Emirates	Ralf Souquet	Germany	Ronato Alcano	Philippines
2007	United Arab Emirates	Ronato Alcano	Philippines	Dennis Orcollo	Philippines
2005	United Arab Emirates	Wu Jia-qing	Chinese Taipei	Nick van den Berg	Netherlands
2004	United Arab Emirates	Efren Reyes	Philippines	Marlon Manalo	Philippines

== Chinese-style ==
=== WPA World Heyball Championship ===
The following is a list of WPA World Heyball champions, a Chinese-originating variant of eight-ball pool, sanctioned by the World Pool Association (WPA).

Year	Location	Winner	Nationality	Runner-up	Nationality
2026	Pune	Gareth Potts	England	Jordan Shepherd	England
2026	Pune	Kelly Fisher	England	Waratthanun Sukritthanes	Thailand
2025	Brisbane	Gareth Potts	England	Sina Valizadeh	Iran
2025	Brisbane	Kelly Fisher	England	Shi Tianqi	China
2024	Yushan	Xui Lin	China	Jack Whelan	England
2024	Yushan	Waratthanun Sukritthanes	Thailand	Diana Khodjaeva	Belgium
2019	Yushan	Zheng Yubo (2)	China	Zhao Ruliang	China
2019	Yushan	Chen Siming (2)	China	Wang Ye	China
2018	Yushan	Zheng Yubo	China	Chris Melling	England
2018	Yushan	Han Yu	China	Liu Shasha	China
2017	Yushan	Fan Yang	China	Bing Jie Chu	China
2017	Yushan	Fu Xiaofang	China	Jin Peng Yu	China
2016	Yushan	Shi Hanqing	China	Mick Hill	England
2016	Yushan	Chen Siming	China	Kelly Fisher	England
2015	Yushan	Darren Appleton	England	Mark Selby	England
2015	Yushan	Bai Ge	China	Zhang Xiaotong	China

== British-style ==
This section lists world champions in British-style eight-ball, which is governed under two slightly different rule sets (usually referred to as blackball and eightball pool) with different governing bodies. This version is played at the amateur and semi-professional levels in Commonwealth countries and a few continental European nations. These tournaments are played on 7-foot pool tables with colored balls—typically red and yellow—instead of the solid and striped balls of American-style pool, though both game types feature a black 8 ball.

=== IEPF World Eightball Championship ===
The following is a list of world championships sanctioned by the International Eightball Pool Federation (formerly called the World Eightball Pool Federation). It was held for 22 consecutive years in Blackpool, England, then in 2022 for the first time was held in Killarney, Ireland. The WEPF rules were introduced in 1998 then modified for professional play in 2022.

In August 2024, the World Eightball Pool Federation (WEPF) officially rebranded as the International Eightball Pool Federation (IEPF) following its affiliation with the World Pool Association (WPA).

Date	Location	Winner	Nationality	Runner-up	Nationality
2026	Marrakesh, Morocco	Declan Brennan	Northern Ireland	Chorfy	Morocco
2026	Marrakesh, Morocco	Barbara Taylor (3)	England	Emma Cunningham	Northern Ireland
2025	Ennis, Ireland	Giuseppe D'Imperio	Northern Ireland	Declan Brennan	Northern Ireland
2025	Ennis, Ireland	Emma Cunningham (4)	Northern Ireland	Collette Henriksen	France
2024	Blackpool, England	Ronan McCarthy (2)	Northern Ireland	Karl Sutton	England
2024	Blackpool, England	Tasneem Solomons	South Africa	Kirsty-Lee Davies	Wales
2023	Agadir, Morocco	Clayton Castaldi	Malta	Josh Kane	England
2023	Agadir, Morocco	Marion Jude	France	Harriet Haynes	England
2022	Killarney, Ireland	Ronan McCarthy	Northern Ireland	Chris Day	England
2022	Killarney, Ireland	Barbara Taylor (2)	England	Sarah Coxon	Wales
2019	Blackpool, England	Mick Hill (6)	England	Dom Cooney	England
2019	Blackpool, England	Amy Beauchamp (3)	England	Sharon James	England
2018	Blackpool, England	Mick Hill (5)	England	Phil Harrison	England
2018	Blackpool, England	Barbara Taylor	England	Sharon James	England
2017	Blackpool, England	Mick Hill (4)	England	Phil Harrison	England
2017	Blackpool, England	Amy Beauchamp (2)	England	Kerry Griffiths	England
2016	Blackpool, England	Shaun Chipperfield	England	Karl Sutton	England
2016	Blackpool, England	Sabrilla Brunet	France	Amy Beauchamp	England
2015	Blackpool, England	Mick Hill (3)	England	Nigel Clarke	England
2015	Blackpool, England	Amy Beauchamp	England	Emma Wilkinson	England
2014	Blackpool, England	Tom Cousins (2)	Wales	Giuseppe d'Imperio	England
2014	Blackpool, England	Kirsty Lee Davis	Wales	Amy Beauchamp	England
2013	Blackpool, England	Tom Cousins	Wales	Craig Waddingham	England
2013	Blackpool, England	Emma Cunningham (3)	Northern Ireland	Barbara Taylor	England
2012	Blackpool, England	John Roe	England	Lee Kendall	England
2012	Blackpool, England	Sue Thompson (11)	Scotland	Sharon Wright	England
2011	Blackpool, England	Adam Davis	England	Phil Harrison	England
2011	Blackpool, England	Emma Cunningham (2)	Northern Ireland	Renata Delahunty	Australia
2010	Blackpool, England	Mick Hill (2)	England	Gareth Potts	England
2010	Blackpool, England	Sue Thompson (10)	Scotland	Emma Cunningham	Northern Ireland
2009	Blackpool, England	Phil Harrison	England	Mick Hill	England
2009	Blackpool, England	Sue Thompson (9)	Scotland	Emma Cunningham	Northern Ireland
2008	Blackpool, England	Gareth Potts (3)	England	Jason Twist	England
2008	Blackpool, England	Lynette Horsburgh	Scotland	Barbara Taylor	England
2007	Blackpool, England	Gareth Potts (2)	England	Mick Hill	England
2007	Blackpool, England	Sue Thompson (8)	Scotland	Emma Cunningham	Northern Ireland
2006	Blackpool, England	Mark Selby	England	Darren Appleton	England
2006	Blackpool, England	Sue Thompson (7)	Scotland	Emma Cunningham	Northern Ireland
2005	Blackpool, England	Gareth Potts	England	Chris Melling	England
2005	Blackpool, England	Emma Cunningham	Northern Ireland	Sue Thompson	Scotland
2004	Blackpool, England	Mick Hill	England	Darren Appleton	England
2004	Blackpool, England	Sue Thompson (6)	Scotland	Emma Cunningham	Northern Ireland
2003	Blackpool, England	Chris Melling (2)	England	Jason Twist	England
2003	Blackpool, England	Sue Thompson (5)	Scotland	Lisa Quick	England
2002	Blackpool, England	Jason Twist (2)	England	Yannick Beaufils	France
2002	Blackpool, England	Sue Thompson (4)	Scotland	Lisa Quick	England
2001	Blackpool, England	Chris Melling	England	Rob McKenna	Wales
2001	Blackpool, England	Lisa Quick (2)	England	Linda Leadbetter	England
2000	Blackpool, England	Jason Twist	England	Carl Morris	England
2000	Blackpool, England	Sue Thompson (3)	Scotland	Linda Leadbitter	England
1999	Blackpool, England	Quinten Hann	Australia	Terry Hunt	England
1999	Blackpool, England	Lisa Quick	England	Linda Leadbitter	England
1998	Blackpool, England	Carl Morris	England	Keith Brewer	England
1998	Blackpool, England	Linda Leadbitter (3)	England	Sue Thompson	Scotland
1997	Manchester, England	Rob McKenna (2)	Wales	Lee Kendall	England
1997	Manchester, England	Sue Thompson (2)	Scotland	Linda Leadbitter	England
1996	Manchester, England	Greg Farren	Ireland	Tony Holgate	Ireland
1996	Manchester, England	Sue Thompson	Scotland	Rosalia Diliberto	France
1995	Chorley, England	Daz Ward	England	Jason Twist	England
1995	Chorley, England	Linda Leadbitter (2)	England	Sue Thompson	Scotland
1994	Manchester, England	Rob McKenna	Wales	Greg Farren	Ireland
1994	Manchester, England	Linda Leadbitter	England	Sue Thompson	Scotland
1993	Manchester, England	Kevin Wright	England	Nigel Davis	Wales
1993	Manchester, England	Linda Moffat	England	Natalie Froling	Australia

=== WPA World Blackball Championship ===
The following is a list of WPA world blackball champions, sanctioned by the World Pool Association (WPA). The blackball rules variant was first discussed by the WPA in a unification meeting in 2004, with rules ratified in 2005 in anticipation of blackball's first world championship in 2006.

Date	Location	Winner	Nationality	Runner-up	Nationality
2026	London, England	Gareth Hibbott	England	Christophe Lambert	France
2026	London, England	Marion Jude	France	Sabrilla Brunet	France
2024	Bridlington, England	Gavin Robinson	England	Alexis Klinka	France
2024	Bridlington, England	Sabrilla Brunet (4)	France	Nicola Roussouw	South Africa
2022	Tangier, Morocco	Senzo Gumede	South Africa	Wade Morley	England
2022	Tangier, Morocco	Beatrice Monyake	South Africa	Yousra Baomar	Morocco
2018	Bridlington, England	Scott Gillespie	Scotland	Dean Shields	England
2018	Bridlington, England	Ashley Marie Bird	England	Emma Reeves	England
2016	Killarney, Ireland	Liam Dunster	Scotland	Jon McAllister	England
2016	Killarney, Ireland	Sabrilla Brunet (3)	France	Sandra Bryan	Ireland
2014	Perth, Scotland	Claudio Cassar	Malta	Paul Vincent Bennett	South Africa
2014	Perth, Scotland	Sabrilla Brunet (2)	France	Aspra Panchoo	South Africa
2012	Blackpool, England	Gavin Phillips	Scotland	Jimmy Carney	England
2012	Blackpool, England	Sabrilla Brunet	France	Claire Dempster	Scotland
2010	Limoges, France	Jayson Shaw	Scotland	Sébastien Ramier	France
2010	Limoges, France	Claire Dempster	Scotland	Emillie Gilberto	France
2008	Mbabane, Eswatini	Wetsi Morake	South Africa	Yulan Govender	South Africa
2008	Mbabane, Eswatini	Apsra Panchoo	South Africa	Amanda Watson	England
2006	Cork, Ireland	Andy Lucas	England	Simon Ward	Wales
2006	Cork, Ireland	Amanda Watson	England	Shona Lucas	Scotland

=== IPA World Blackball Championship ===
The following is a list of IPA world blackball champions, sanctioned by the International Professional Pool Association. The IPA events use the WPA blackball rules.

Date	Location	Winner	Nationality	Runner-up	Nationality
2026	Bradford, England	Cory Rees	Wales	Michael Rhodes	England
2026	Bradford, England	Amy Beum	England	Rebecca Kenna	England
2025	Bradford, England	Michael Rhodes	England	Ben Davies	Wales
2025	Bradford, England	Emma Cunningham (2)	Northern Ireland	Ashleigh O'Neill	Scotland
2024	Bradford, England	Gareth Hibbott (2)	England	Jake-Dylan Newlove	England
2024	Bradford, England	Keira Whitcombe	Wales	Rhiannon Graham	England
2023	Bradford, England	Clint I'Anson	England	Simon Ward	Wales
2023	Bradford, England	Amy Beauchamp (2)	England	Emma Reeves	England
2022	Bradford, England	Liam Dunster	Scotland	Gareth Hibbott	England
2022	Bradford, England	Harriet Haynes	England	Deb Burchell	England
2020	Bradford, England	Jon McAllister	England	Aaron Davies	England
2020	Bradford, England	Amy Beauchamp (1)	England	Emma Cunningham	Northern Ireland
2019	Bradford, England	Marc Farnsworth	England	Tom Cousins	Wales
2019	Bradford, England	Emma Cunningham (1)	Northern Ireland	Kerry Griffiths	England
2018	Bradford, England	Ben Davies	Wales	Simon Ward	Wales
2018	Bradford, England	Michelle Roonay	Northern Ireland	Collette Henriksen	Northern Ireland
2017	Bradford, England	Craig Marsh	Wales	Simon Fitzsimmons	England
2017	Bradford, England	Collette Henriksen	Northern Ireland	Leanne Evans	Wales
2016	Bradford, England	Gareth Hibbott (1)	England	Craig Marsh	Wales
2016	Bradford, England	Deb Burchell (2)	England	Shona Lucas	Scotland
2015	Bradford, England	Jack Whelan	England	Jason Twist	England
2015	Bradford, England	Deb Burchell	England	Shona Lucas	Scotland
2014	Bradford, England	Gareth Potts	England	Clint I'Anson	England

=== PPPO World Eightball Championship ===
The following is a list of PPPO world eightball champions, sanctioned by the Professional Pool Players Organisation. The final championship was held in 2005, and the PPPO eventually disbanded as pool players moved on to WPA (2006) and IPA blackball.

Historically, female players faced barriers to joining PPPO events. Most notably, 11-time world champion Sue Thompson fought a legal battle in the 1990s over the organization's initial refusal to grant women professional status.

Date	Location	Winner	Nationality	Runner-up	Nationality
2005	Bridlington, England	Ben Davies	Wales	Derek Murphy	Scotland
2004	Bridlington, England	Andy Lucas (2)	England	Rob Hill	England
2003	Bridlington, England	Rob Hill	England	Antz Morrison	Scotland
2002	Lerwick, Scotland	Steve Sanders	England	Andy Lucas	England
2001	Morecambe, England	Ross McInnes (4)	Scotland	Rob Chambers	England
2000	Bridlington, England	Ross McInnes (3)	Scotland	Steve Sanders	England
1999	Morecambe, England	Andy Lucas	Scotland	Ronan McCarthy	Northern Ireland
1998	Morecambe, England	Ross McInnes (2)	Scotland	Steve Sanders	England
1997	Morecambe, England	Kevin Treanor	Scotland	Ronan McCarthy	Northern Ireland
1996	Morecambe, England	Ross McInnes	Scotland	Mark White	England
