= Chinese Eight-ball World Championship =

Annual professional Chinese 8-ball tournament

The World Chinese Eight-ball Championship (now known as the WPA World Heyball Championship) is a pool tournament in the discipline of Chinese eight-ball. The event has been held annually since 2015, first taking place in Yushan, Jiangxi in China. The tournament is one of the highest-paid pool tournaments in the world.

== Results ==
Below is a list of results from the tournament starting from its inception in 2015.

=== Men ===
Year	Location	Final		
Year	Location	Winner	Score	Runner-up
2015	(China) Yushan	(England) Darren Appleton	21–19	(England) Mark Selby
2016	(China) Yushan	(China) Shi Hanqing	21–20	(England) Mick Hill
2017	(China) Yushan	(China) Yang Fan	21–19	(China) Chu Bingjie
2018	(China) Yushan	(China) Zheng Yubo	21–19	(England) Chris Melling
2019	(China) Yushan	(China) Zheng Yubo (2)	21–15	(China) Zhao Ruliang
2024	(Slovenia) Podčetrtek	(China) Xui Lin	7–3	(England) Jack Whelan
2025	(Australia) Brisbane	(England) Gareth Potts	7–4	(Iran) Sina Valizadeh
2026	(India) Pune	(England) Gareth Potts	7–4	(Wales) Jordan Shepherd

=== Women ===
Year	Location	Final		
Year	Location	Winner	Score	Runner-up
2015	(China) Yushan	(China) Bai Ge	17–13	(China) Zhang Xiaotong
2016	(China) Yushan	(China) Chen Siming	17–11	(England) Kelly Fisher
2017	(China) Yushan	(China) Fu Xiaofang	17–16	(China) Yu Jinpeng
2018	(China) Yushan	(China) Han Yu	17–14	(China) Liu Shasha
2019	(China) Yushan	(China) Chen Siming (2)	17–14	(China) Wang Ye
2024	(Slovenia) Podčetrtek	(Thailand) Waratthanun Sukritthanes	6–1	(Belgium) Diana Khodjaeva
2025	(Australia) Brisbane	(England) Kelly Fisher	6–5	(China) Shi Tianqi
2026	(India) Pune	(England) Kelly Fisher	5–5^{(5–3)}	(Thailand) Waratthanun Sukritthanes

== See also ==
- WPA World Eight-ball Championship
