= Michaela Tabb =

Scottish Snooker Referee

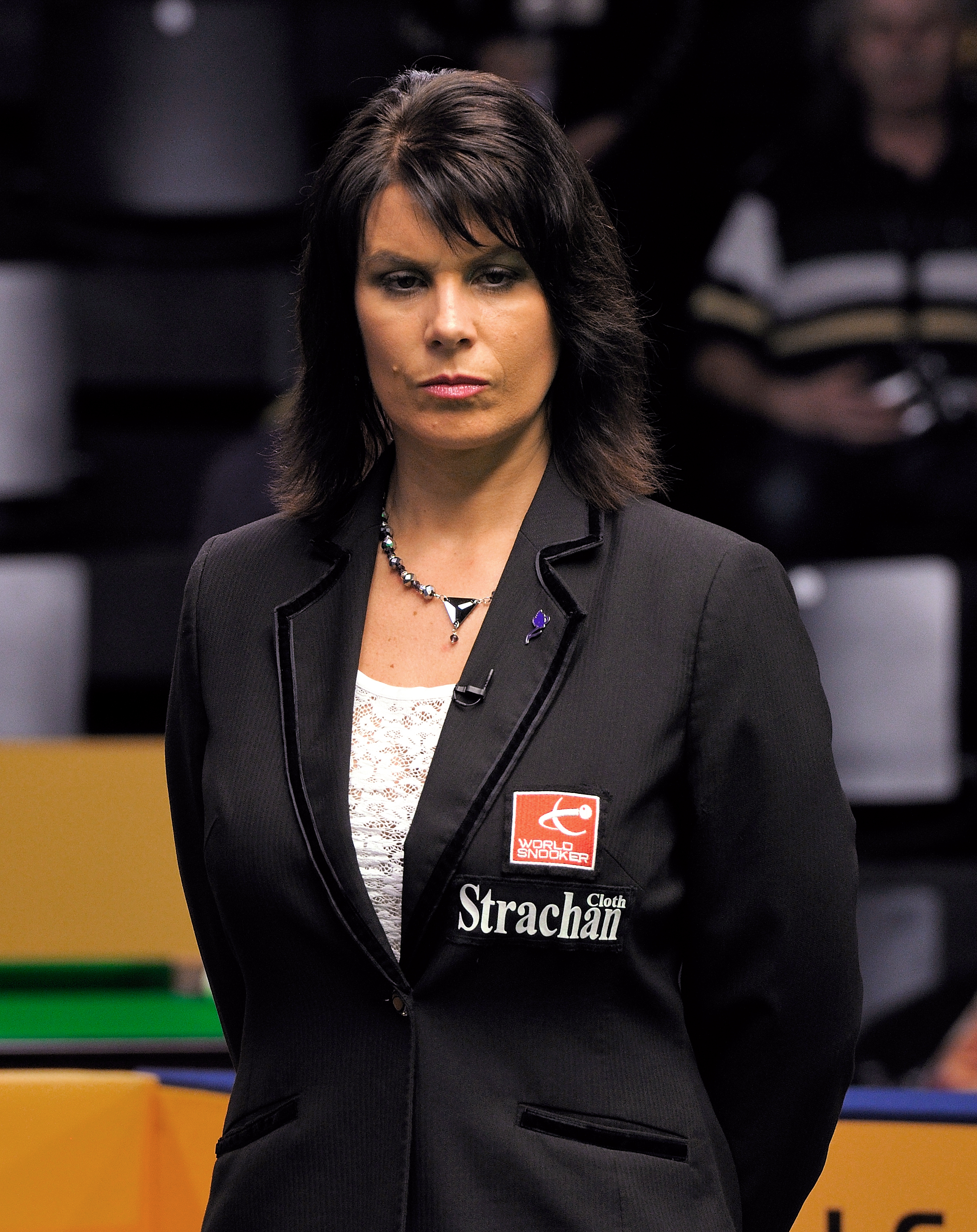
- Tabb refereeing in Berlin for the 2013 German Masters

Personal information
- Born: 11 December 1967 (age 58) Bath, Somerset, England

Sport
- Country: Scotland
- Sport: Snooker
- Professional: 2001–2015

Michaela Tabb (born 11 December 1967) is a Scottish snooker and pool referee. She established significant milestones for female officials in professional cue sports, beginning in pool, where she officiated at top tournaments such as the WPA World Nine-ball Championship and the Mosconi Cup. She qualified in 2001 to referee on the World Snooker Tour and was the sport's highest profile female referee for the next 14 years. She became the first woman to officiate at a professional ranking snooker tournament at the 2002 Welsh Open, and the first woman to referee a ranking tournament final at the 2007 Welsh Open. She was the first woman to referee the World Snooker Championship final, which she did twice, in 2009 and 2012. She remained the only woman to referee the World final until Desislava Bozhilova did so in the 2025 event.

Tabb left the professional snooker tour in March 2015 following a dispute with the sport's commercial arm, World Snooker Ltd, against which she brought a case alleging sex discrimination, unfair dismissal, and breach of contract. The parties reached an out-of-court settlement in September 2015, under which World Snooker Ltd paid Tabb an undisclosed financial sum. She continued to referee at pool events and on the World Seniors Tour. In May 2025, following the 2025 World Seniors Championship, she retired from refereeing standard snooker events.

Tabb is also a former pool player. In the 1990s and early 2000s, she competed on the women's eight-ball pool circuit, where she won a number of titles as a solo competitor and as a member, and later captain, of the Scottish Ladies' Pool Team.

== Personal life ==
Born on 11 December 1967, in Bath, England, Tabb moved to Scotland with her family when she was three years old. She studied chemistry, biology, and psychology at the University of Glasgow, dropping out before receiving a degree. Before becoming a full-time professional referee, she worked as a sales representative for a number of blue-chip companies. She was also a sales representative for the Ann Summers lingerie retailer. Tabb resides in Dunfermline, Scotland, with her husband, pool player Ross McInnes, whom she met while they were playing on the men's and women's Scottish pool teams. They have two sons, Morgan and Preston, both of whom play competitive pool; Morgan McInnes has played on Scotland's under-23 A team at the European Pool Championships. In July 2018, Tabb and her family established Blackball Tables, distributing pool tables and accessories. After running the business from their home for five years, they opened a store, On Cue World, in Rosyth in 2024.

== Playing career ==
Tabb started playing competitive blackball in 1991, at the age of 23. Selected the following year to play on the Scottish Ladies' Pool Team, she went on to captain the team to two consecutive Grand Slam titles in 1997 and 1998 by winning the Nations Cup, European Championships, and World Championships in the same season. She remained on the team until 2003. Her sister Juliette also played on the Scottish ladies' team. As an individual competitor, Tabb won the UK women's singles title in 1997. The following year, she won the European Pool Championships held in Gibraltar.

== Refereeing career ==
=== Pool ===
Tabb began refereeing in the mid-1990s when she and her husband, Ross McInnes, began running amateur eight-ball and nine-ball pool tournaments. McInnes subsequently encouraged her to pursue refereeing professionally. She made her professional refereeing debut at the St. Andrew's Cup nine-ball pool tournament in September 1997, while pregnant with her first son. She refereed on television for the first time the following year, when the 1998 St. Andrew's Cup, sponsored by Matchroom Sport, was broadcast on Sky Sports. She went on to become one of pool's top officials, refereeing at the WPA World Nine-ball Championship and the Mosconi Cup. In 2017 Tabb became the head referee on the World Pool Series.

=== Snooker ===
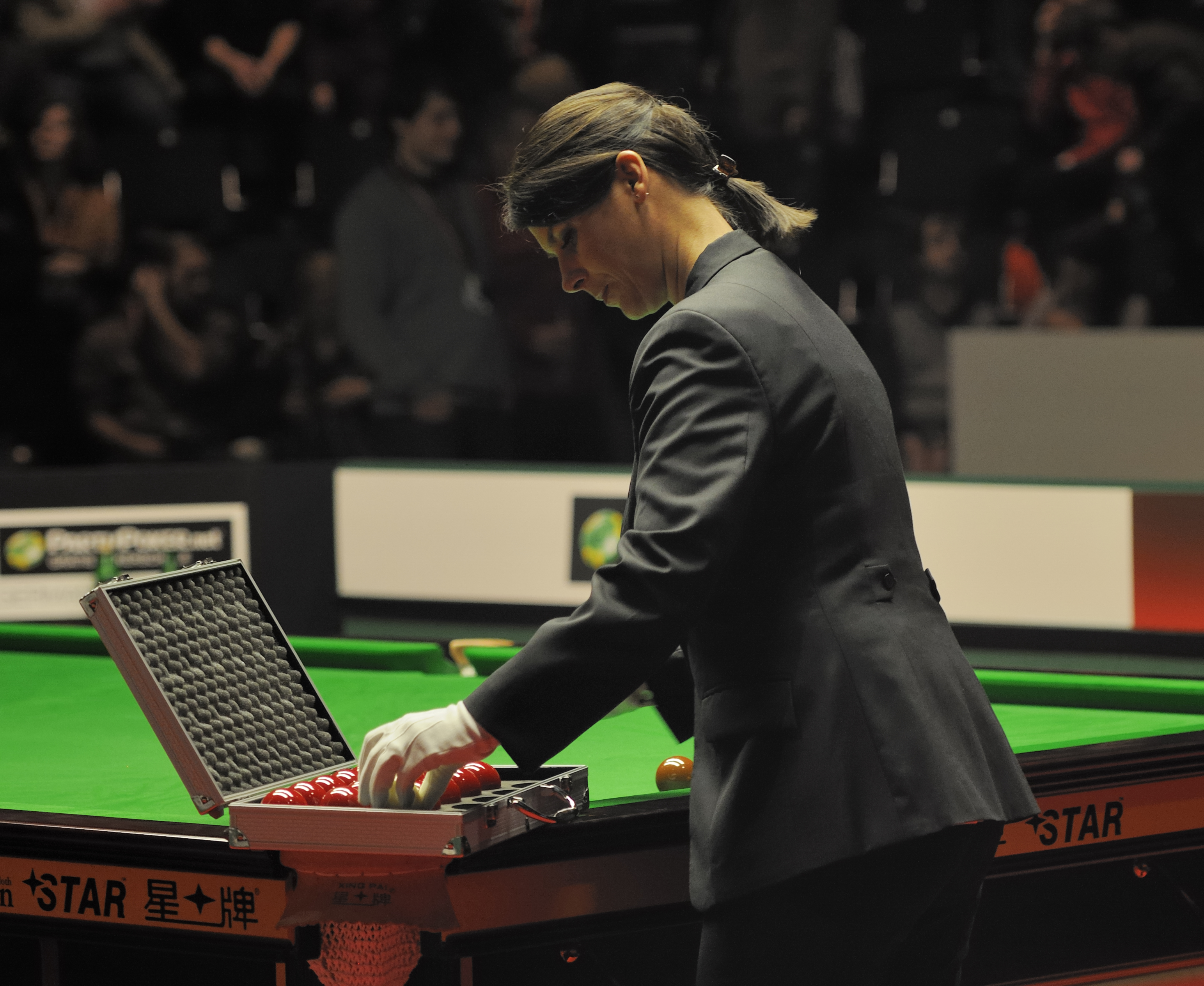
Tabb replacing the balls into their case during the 2012 German Masters final

Stating that he wanted to change the dowdy, all-male image of snooker referees, Jim McKenzie, then chief executive of the World Professional Billiards and Snooker Association, recruited Tabb to referee snooker events in 2001. Exempted from the customary five-year refereeing apprenticeship, she qualified as a Class 3 snooker referee in September 2001. She conceded that this fast-tracking generated resentment among her fellow officials and referees.

On 23 January 2002, Tabb became the first woman to referee at a professional ranking snooker tournament when she took charge of a first-round match between Ken Doherty and James Wattana at the 2002 Welsh Open in Newport. In 2003, she made her World Snooker Championship debut at the Crucible Theatre in Sheffield, refereeing a first-round match between Mark King and Drew Henry. In July 2003, dwindling sponsorship revenue forced the WPBSA to cut its tournament referees from ten to eight. Tabb's contract, along with that of Dutch referee Johan Oomen, was terminated on a last-in, first-out basis, threatening her future in the sport. However, the WPBSA soon reversed its decision to dismiss Tabb and she signed a new contract in September 2003, along with Oomen.

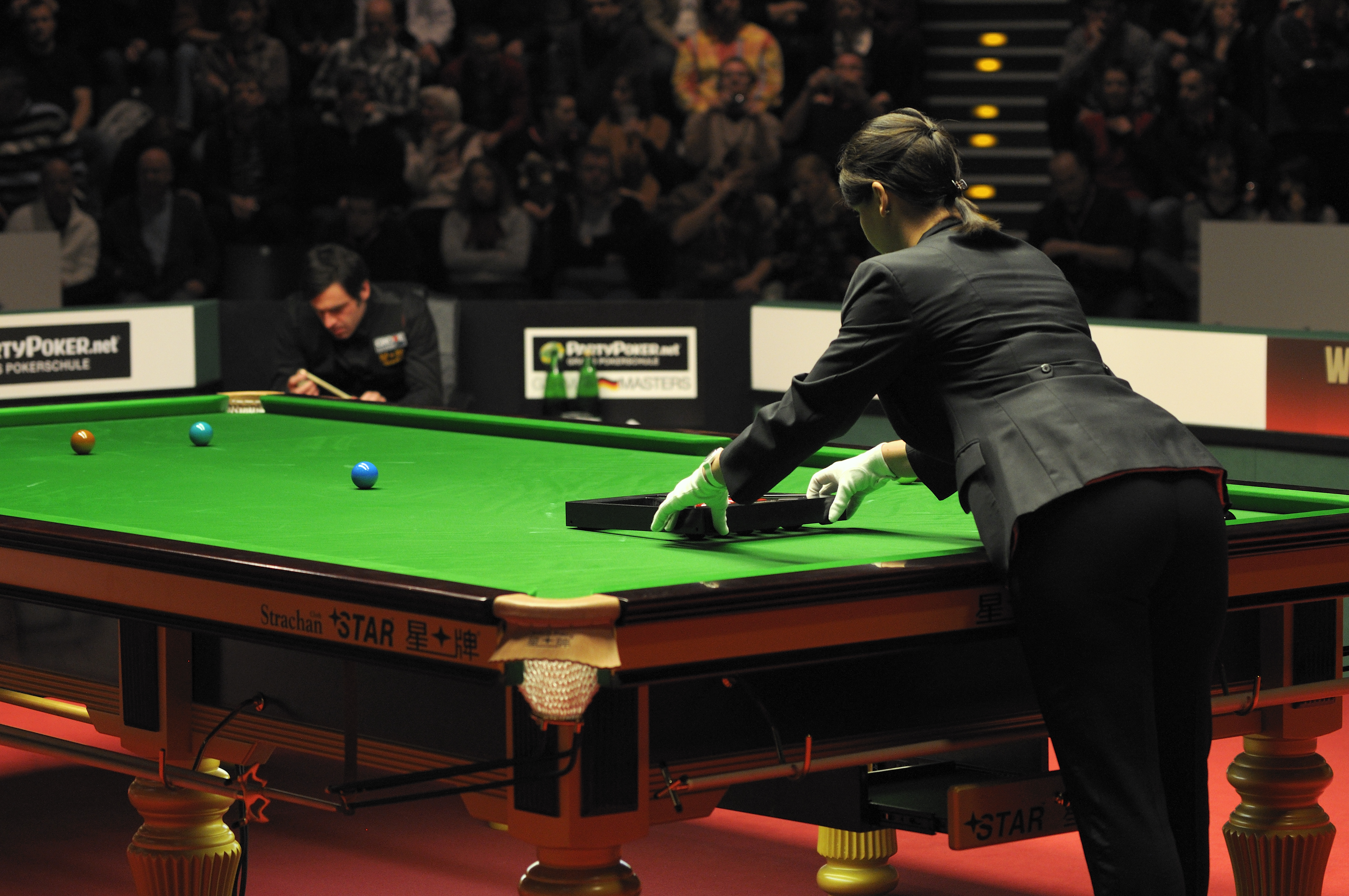
Tabb using a triangle to rack the red balls

On 18 February 2007, Tabb became the first woman to officiate at a ranking event final, taking charge as Neil Robertson defeated Andrew Higginson 9–8 to win the 2007 Welsh Open. On 20 January 2008, she refereed her first Triple Crown final at the 2008 Masters, which saw Mark Selby defeat Stephen Lee 10–3. On 5 April 2009, she took charge of the China Open final in Beijing, where Peter Ebdon beat John Higgins 10–8.

Tabb became the first woman to referee a World Snooker Championship final in 2009, officiating as John Higgins defeated Shaun Murphy 18–9 to capture his third world title. She also refereed the 2012 World Snooker Championship final, in which Ronnie O'Sullivan defeated Ali Carter 18–11 to win his fourth world title. She remained the only female referee to have officiated at a world championship final until Desislava Bozhilova did so at the 2025 World Snooker Championship final.

On 19 March 2015, World Snooker Ltd announced that Tabb had left the professional refereeing circuit. In September 2015, appearing under her married name of Michaela McInnes, Tabb brought an Employment Tribunal against World Snooker Ltd, claiming sexual discrimination, unfair dismissal and breach of contract. World Snooker Ltd made an undisclosed out-of-court financial settlement. After leaving the main professional circuit, Tabb continued to referee World Seniors Tour events, including the World Seniors Championship finals in 2019, 2020, 2022, 2023 and 2025. On 11 May 2025, after refereeing the first session of the 2025 World Seniors Championship final, Tabb retired from refereeing standard snooker events, bringing to an end a 24-year career.

The professional snooker tour now features a significant number of female referees, including Desislava Bozhilova, Maike Kesseler, and Tatiana Woollaston. Tabb has commented on her groundbreaking role in opening the sport up to female referees, saying: "I know that my legacy is that all these young ladies that I can see on the television are doing that job because I did it”.
