= 2015 Chinese Eight-ball World Championship =

Tournament information
- Dates: 24 January – 2 February 2015
- Venue: First High School Stadium, Yushan, Jiangxi, China

Final
- Champion: England Darren Appleton / China Bai Ge

The 2015 CBSA World Chinese Eight-ball Championship (also known as the 2015 Chinese Pool World Championship) was a professional pool tournament that took place from 24 January to 2 February 2015. The event was held in the First High School Stadium in Yushan, Jiangxi in China. This tournament was the inaugural CBSA World Chinese Eight-ball Championship event, played under the Chinese eight-ball rules.

Darren Appleton won the event, defeating Mark Selby in the final 21–19. Chinese players Liu Haitao and Chu Bingjie were third and fourth respectively. The women's competition was won by Bai Ge who defeated Zhang Xiaotong 17–13. Yu Han came in third place, with Allison Fisher in fourth place.

== Prize fund ==
Place	Men	Women
Winner	98.000 US-$	64.000 US-$
Runner-up	49.000 US-$	32.000 US-$
3rd place	24.500 US-$	16.000 US-$
Fourth place	12.740 US-$	8.000 US-$
Quarter-finalist	7.840 US-$	6.400 US-$
Last 16	3.920 US-$	2.400 US-$
Last 32	1.568 US-$	
total	298.000 US-$	186.000 US-$
total	484.000 US-$	

== Results ==
1st Round
1	Chu Bingjie	11
32	Jin Long	9
17	Liu Chao	3
16	Zheng Yubo	11
9	Chen Huqing	11
24	Cao Yupeng	10
25	Dai Yong	11
8	Joe Perry	10
5	Xin Shi	9
28	Darren Appleton	11
21	Ma Yang	5
12	Yu Haitao	11
13	Dang Jinhu	6
20	Yang Fan	11
29	Tom Ford	4
4	Neil Robertson	11
3	Chris Melling	11
30	Nikos Ekonomopoulos	6
19	Shi Hanqing	7
14	Mark Selby	11
11	Liu Chiang	11
22	Wang Peng	6
27	Wang Can	11
6	Thorsten Hohmann	5
7	Wu Zhenyu	11
26	Albin Ouschan	9
23	Graeme Dott	5
10	Daryl Peach	11
15	Liu Haitao	11
18	Zhang Kunpeng	5
31	Waleed Majid	11
2	Zheng Guanghao	10

2nd Round
Chu Bingjie	13
Zheng Yubo	7
Chen Huqing	13
Dai Yong	11
Darren Appleton	13
Yu Haitao	8
Yang Fan	12
Neil Robertson	13
Chris Melling	12
Mark Selby	13
Liu Chiang	13
Wang Can	9
Wu Zhenyu	13
Daryl Peach	7
Liu Haitao	13
Waleed Majid	12

Quarterfinals
Chu Bingjie	13
Chen Huqing	7
Darren Appleton	13
Neil Robertson	12
Mark Selby	13
Liu Chiang	10
Wu Zhenyu	7
Liu Haitao	13

Semifinals
Chu Bingjie	13
Darren Appleton	15
Mark Selby	15
Liu Haitao	13

Finals
Darren Appleton	21
Mark Selby	19

== Women ==
First round
1	Kamila Khodjaeva	6
16	Ye Yang	9
8	Mi Lim-yun	7
9	Allison Fisher	9
5	Wang Xiatong	2
12	Zhang Xiatong	9
4	Fu Xiaofang	9
13	Chen Siming	3
6	Qi Shitian	0
11	Yu Han	9
3	Yang Fan	9
14	Jin Pengyu	8
7	Bai Ge	9
10	Xue Chen	8
2	Liu Shasha	7
15	Kelly Fisher	9

Quarter-finals
Ye Yang	10
Allison Fisher	11
Zhang Xiaotong	11
Fu Xiaofang	10
Yu Han	11
Yang Fan	8
Bai Ge	11
Kelly Fisher	4

Semi-finals
Allison Fisher	11
Zhang Xiaotong	13
Yu Han	12
Bai Ge	13

Final
Zhang Xiaotong	13
Bai Ge	17
