= Jason Twist =

British pool player (1968–2023)

Personal information
- Born: 28 March 1968 Leicester, England
- Died: 2023

Pool career
- Pool games: Eight-ball

Jason "Tornado" Twist (28 March 1968 – 14 May 2023) was an English professional player of eight-ball pool and a four-time world champion.

Twist won the WEPF World Championship (world rules) twice, in 2000 and 2002. He also won the IPA World Professional Seniors Championship (blackball rules) twice, in 2015 and 2016.

He won three European titles and represented the England national pool team from 1989 to 2009, winning 12 world team titles, bringing his total to 16 world titles.

Twist also reached the world championship final on four further occasions—in 1995, 2003, 2008, and 2015—but lost to Daz Ward, Chris Melling, Gareth Potts, and Jack Whelan respectively.

Twist lived in the North Devon coastal town of Ilfracombe.

== Achievements ==
World titles

- 2000 – WEPF World Eightball Championship
- 2002 – WEPF World Eightball Championship
- 2015 – IPA World Professional Seniors Championship
- 2016 – IPA World Professional Seniors Championship

Team achievements

- Member of the England national pool team (1989–2009)
- Part of England teams that won 12 World Team Championships
