= Eightball pool =

Eightball pool can refer to two related but different games in the pool family of games:

- Eight-ball, the version originating in the United States, and globally standardized by the World Pool-Billiard Association; uses striped and solid-colored sets of numbered balls
- Blackball (pool), the version originating in the United Kingdom (where it is known as eightball pool), and internationally standardised across several Commonwealth and European countries; uses unnumbered balls (aside from the 8), usually in sets of red and yellow.
