= Gareth Hibbott =

English pool player

Personal information
- Nickname: The Godfather
- Born: 1975 (age 50–51) Southport, England, UK

Pool career
- Country: England
- Pool games: British-style eight-ball (B8B)

Tournament wins
- World Champion: 2-time IPA World Blackball champion and 1-time WPA World Blackball champion

Gareth Hibbott is an English professional pool player born in 1975. He was IPA men's world champion of blackball in 2016 and 2024, the only man to win it twice.

He was also WPA men's world champion of blackball in 2026, beating Christophe Lambert of France 6–1 in the final.

== See also ==
- Profile at Cuescore
