= Ross McInnes (pool player) =

Scottish pool player

Ross McInnes (born 1955) is a Scottish pool player. He was four times PPPO men's world champion of English 8-ball pool in 1996, 1998, 2000 and 2001. He won his first Scottish title in 1981 and by 2002 was nine times Scottish champion and had lifted more world and European titles than anyone else. He then went on to win multiple World Seniors and World Masters championships and retired from professional pool in 2018 as part of a winning Scottish Masters team.

Ross is an organiser of events and promoter of the game and sells blackball pool tables. He is married to Michaela Tabb.
