= Asian Players Tour Championship 2012/2013 – Event 2 =

Asian Players Tour Championship 2012/2013 Event 2

Tournament information
- Dates: 23–27 September 2012
- Venue: Yixing Sports Centre
- City: Yixing
- Country: China
- Organisation: World Snooker
- Format: Minor-ranking event
- Total prize fund: £50,000
- Winner's share: £10,000
- Highest break: Matthew Stevens (WAL) (137)

Final
- Champion: Stephen Lee (ENG)
- Runner-up: Ding Junhui (CHN)
- Score: 4–0

The Guotai Liquor Asian Players Tour Championship 2012/2013 – Event 2 was a professional minor-ranking snooker tournament that took place between 23 and 27 September 2012 at the Yixing Sports Centre in Yixing, China.

Stephen Lee won his ninth professional title by defeating Ding Junhui 4–0 in the final. This win also guaranteed Lee a place in this season's Players Tour Championship Grand Finals, but he couldn't participate due to his suspension from professional snooker.

== Prize fund and ranking points ==
The breakdown of prize money and ranking points of the event is shown below:

	Prize fund	Ranking points^{1}
Winner	£10,000	2,000
Runner-up	£5,000	1,600
Semi-finalist	£2,500	1,280
Quarter-finalist	£1,500	1,000
Last 16	£1,000	760
Last 32	£600	560
Last 64	£200	360
Total	£50,000	–

- ^{1} Only professional players can earn ranking points.

== Main draw ==
=== Top half ===
==== Section 1 ====
Last 128; Best of 7 frames
(Hong Kong) Chou Hon Man	2
(China) Wang Yuchen	4
(England) Mark King	0
(China) Niu Zhuang	4
(Hong Kong) Au Chi-wai	0
(China) Cui Ming	4
(China) Hu Hao	4
(Wales) Ryan Day	2
(England) Michael Holt	4
(China) A Bulajiang	0

Last 64; Best of 7 frames
(England) Stuart Bingham	4
(China) Wang Yuchen	0
(China) Niu Zhuang	4
(China) Cui Ming	1
(China) Li Yan	4
(China) Hu Hao	2
(England) Michael Holt	2
(China) Jin Long	4

Last 32; Best of 7 frames
(England) Stuart Bingham	3
(China) Niu Zhuang	4
(China) Li Yan	1
(China) Jin Long	4

Last 16; Best of 7 frames
(China) Niu Zhuang	2
(China) Jin Long	4

==== Section 2 ====
Last 128; Best of 7 frames
(China) Chen Bo	2
(Iran) Hossein Vafaei	4
(China) Cao Yupeng	4
(China) Jeya Selvan	0
(China) Xie Bin	1
(China) Guan Zhen	4
(China) Ju Reti	4
(China) Lin Shuai	2

Last 64; Best of 7 frames
(China) Li Yuan	4
(Iran) Hossein Vafaei	2
(China) Cao Yupeng	4
(China) Xu Xinjian	1
(China) Wang Linhan	4
(China) Guan Zhen	1
(China) Ju Reti	0
(Wales) Mark Williams	4

Last 32; Best of 7 frames
(China) Li Yuan	1
(China) Cao Yupeng	4
(China) Wang Linhan	2
(Wales) Mark Williams	4

Last 16; Best of 7 frames
(China) Cao Yupeng	4
(Wales) Mark Williams	3

==== Section 3 ====
Last 128; Best of 7 frames
(England) Oliver Brown	4
(China) Zhong Weihao	0
(China) Pa Ruke	4
(Hong Kong) Leong Man Hoi	2
(China) Huang Hooyong	0
(England) Ricky Walden	4
(India) Aditya Mehta	w/d
(Hong Kong) Andy Lee	w/o

Last 64; Best of 7 frames
(China) Ding Junhui	4
(England) Oliver Brown	3
(China) Pa Ruke	2
(China) Tang Jun	4
(China) Yu Delu	3
(England) Ricky Walden	4
(Hong Kong) Andy Lee	w/d
(England) Tom Ford	w/o

Last 32; Best of 7 frames
(China) Ding Junhui	4
(China) Tang Jun	1
(England) Ricky Walden	1
(England) Tom Ford	4

Last 16; Best of 7 frames
(China) Ding Junhui	4
(England) Tom Ford	1

==== Section 4 ====
Last 128; Best of 7 frames
(Hong Kong) Wan Nansen Sin Man	2
(China) Liang Wenbo	4
(Wales) Matthew Stevens	4
(China) Chen Feilong	1
(China) Zhao Xintong	4
(China) Zhang Dongtao	0
(China) Zhou Yuelong	4
(Hong Kong) Lin Tang Ho Alan	0

Last 64; Best of 7 frames
(China) Cai Jianzhong	0
(China) Liang Wenbo	4
(Wales) Matthew Stevens	4
(China) Lin Yongzhi	1
(Scotland) Marcus Campbell	4
(China) Zhao Xintong	1
(China) Zhou Yuelong	4
(China) Zhang Anda	1

Last 32; Best of 7 frames
(China) Liang Wenbo	2
(Wales) Matthew Stevens	4
(Scotland) Marcus Campbell	4
(China) Zhou Yuelong	2

Last 16; Best of 7 frames
(Wales) Matthew Stevens	3
(Scotland) Marcus Campbell	4

=== Bottom half ===
==== Section 5 ====
Last 128; Best of 7 frames
(China) Liu Fan	2
(China) Wang Heng	4
(China) Shi Hanqing	4
(China) Luo Guangsheng	1
(China) Li Yujin	4
(Australia) Ben Judge	2
(China) Yuan Sijun	0
(England) Barry Hawkins	4
(England) Rory McLeod	4
(China) Ma Tingpeng	2

Last 64; Best of 7 frames
(China) Chen Zhe	4
(China) Wang Heng	0
(China) Shi Hanqing	4
(China) Li Yujin	2
(China) Rouzi Maimaiti	2
(England) Barry Hawkins	4
(England) Rory McLeod	3
(China) Zhang Yang	4

Last 32; Best of 7 frames
(China) Chen Zhe	3
(China) Shi Hanqing	4
(England) Barry Hawkins	4
(China) Zhang Yang	0

Last 16; Best of 7 frames
(China) Shi Hanqing	2
(England) Barry Hawkins	4

==== Section 6 ====
Last 128; Best of 7 frames
(China) Zhang Yong	1
(England) Paul Davison	4
(China) Li Hang	4
(China) Sun Hongrui	2
(China) Zhang Zihao	1
(China) Lu Ning	4
(China) Xiao Guodong	4
(China) Wang Zepeng	0

Last 64; Best of 7 frames
(China) Mei Xiwen	4
(England) Paul Davison	1
(China) Li Hang	2
(Hong Kong) Marco Fu	4
(China) Cao Xinlong	4
(China) Lu Ning	2
(China) Xiao Guodong	4
(China) Tian Pengfei	3

Last 32; Best of 7 frames
(China) Mei Xiwen	1
(Hong Kong) Marco Fu	4
(China) Cao Xinlong	1
(China) Xiao Guodong	4

Last 16; Best of 7 frames
(Hong Kong) Marco Fu	1
(China) Xiao Guodong	4

==== Section 7 ====
Last 128; Best of 7 frames
(China) Liu Yiqi	2
(China) Lyu Haotian	4
(China) Ma Chunmao	w/d
(China) Wang Bo	w/o
(China) Lei Zhen	1
(China) Liu Chuang	4
(Wales) Daniel Wells	4
(China) Fang Xiongman	0

Last 64; Best of 7 frames
(England) Ben Woollaston	4
(China) Lyu Haotian	2
(China) Wang Bo	2
(China) Pan Weixing	4
(England) Mark Davis	4
(China) Liu Chuang	3
(Wales) Daniel Wells	0
(England) Robert Milkins	4

Last 32; Best of 7 frames
(England) Ben Woollaston	4
(China) Pan Weixing	3
(England) Mark Davis	3
(England) Robert Milkins	4

Last 16; Best of 7 frames
(England) Ben Woollaston	1
(England) Robert Milkins	4

==== Section 8 ====
Last 128; Best of 7 frames
(China) Pu Jingsong	2
(Wales) Jamie Jones	4
(England) Joe Perry	4
(China) Long Wang	0
(China) Chen Ruifu	4
(China) Long Yun	0
(China) Li Wei	4
(China) Da Hailin	2
(China) Zhou Jun	3
(China) Zhang Yi	4

Last 64; Best of 7 frames
(China) Zhu Yinghui	1
(Wales) Jamie Jones	4
(England) Joe Perry	4
(China) Lu Chenwei	1
(China) Chen Ruifu	4
(China) Li Wei	3
(China) Zhang Yi	1
(England) Stephen Lee	4

Last 32; Best of 7 frames
(Wales) Jamie Jones	2
(England) Joe Perry	4
(China) Chen Ruifu	1
(England) Stephen Lee	4

Last 16; Best of 7 frames
(England) Joe Perry	0
(England) Stephen Lee	4

=== Finals ===
Quarter-finals; Best of 7 frames		Semi-finals; Best of 7 frames		Final; Best of 7 frames
(China) Jin Long	2
(China) Cao Yupeng	4	(China) Cao Yupeng	2
(China) Ding Junhui	4	(China) Ding Junhui	4
(Scotland) Marcus Campbell	2			(China) Ding Junhui	0
(England) Barry Hawkins	3			(England) Stephen Lee	4
(China) Xiao Guodong	4	(China) Xiao Guodong	2
(England) Robert Milkins	1	(England) Stephen Lee	4
(England) Stephen Lee	4

== Century breaks ==
- 137 – Matthew Stevens
- 113 – Stephen Lee
- 111 – Ricky Walden
- 110, 102 – Xiao Guodong
- 107, 105, 102 – Ding Junhui
- 104 – Hossein Vafaei
