= EPBF =

EPBF may refer to:

- European Pocket Billiard Federation, the European governing body for pocket billiards.
- Electron-beam additive manufacturing, Electron-beam Powder Bed Fusion
