= Adam Davis (pool player) =

English pool player

Adam "Nuisance" Davis is an English pool player from Stoke. In 2009 he captured the EEPF European Eight-Ball Championship over Steve Petty. In 2011 he was WEPF men's world champion of English 8-ball pool.
