= Phil Harrison (pool player) =

English pool player

Pool career
- Country: England

Tournament wins
- Current rank: 2 (as of year-end, 2017)
- Highest rank: 1

Phil "The Farmer" Harrison is an English pool player from Cambridgeshire. In 2009 he was WEPF World Champion of English 8-ball pool, and finished as the runner-up in 2011, 2017 and 2018. Phil is currently sponsored by Criteria Cars, a family run car dealership in Ely.

== Career ==
=== Individual Events ===
In what he considers to be his biggest win outside of the World Championship won in 2009, Harrison won the inaugural China Classic event in 1999. Hosted in Beijing, and watched by 15 million viewers, this tournament introduced some of the finest cue-sports players in the world to a primarily Chinese audience. Harrison came through a tough semi-final against compatriot Chris Melling, before beating the #1 ranked Chinese player in the final.

When the opportunity presented itself in 2005, Harrison accepted an invitation for entry into the International Pool Tour, an event founded and administrated by American businessman Kevin Trudeau.

In another divergence away from his primary equipment, Harrison has twice reached the last 64 in the World 9-ball Championships, both times in Cardiff, Wales. He considers the American-style equipment difficult to adjust to, and has not sought to take on that discipline much since 2003, with the exception of some local events.

Harrison has been a long-standing member of UK-style 8-ball's elite, winning around 30 major events at the time of writing, including the WEPF World Championships and World Masters events, International Professional Pool Players Association (IPA) Tour events, IPA Professional Events, UK Tour Events, and other invitational tournaments.

Harrison has also performed well in the UK Tour's Premier League, winning the title on more than one occasion, and finishing runner-up in 2017.

Alongside the major event success he has enjoyed, Harrison has also won a large number of regional one-day and tour (pool series) events, including sustained success in the Herts Pool Tour, and numerous winner's cheques from tours located in (among others) the South-East, Northants, and Great Yarmouth.

Harrison is also the current national champion after winning the EPA men's national championship.

=== Team Events ===
Harrison played for England regularly in the 1990s until the middle of the next decade, winning numerous World and European Team Championships.

He has also been involved in successful National Championship winning teams in both Inter-County and Inter-League team formats, notably with Cambridgeshire in 1992 and the Mickey Flynns Inter-League team in 2016.

=== Playing Style ===
Phil is regarded by many as the best doubler in the game, and has very few weaknesses. He is tidy with the cue-ball, and looks to take out finishes with the cue-ball moving as little as possible. He is tactically astute, although he personally refers to this as the weakest part of his game. The most common attribute mentioned in relation to him is his consistency; he is remarkably resolute and very calm under pressure, and ruthless when given a chance, no matter if he's a few frames ahead or a few behind.

=== Trivia ===
A recent (November 2017) study of Herts Pool Tour results since 2012 have revealed the following statistics:

Deciding frames record overall: Played 26 - Won 16 (62%) - Lost 10

Deciding frames record since the start of 2016: Played 8 - Won 6 (75%) - Lost 2

Matches "won-to-nil" (whitewashes) since 2012: 18

Among these eighteen "wins to nil" were wins over previous Herts Tour event winners John Roe and Rich Wharton, along with former professionals Jimmy Croxton, Ian Hubbard and Steve Kane. Harrison also enjoys the distinction of having whitewashed Dave Rogers on two occasions during this period. This statistic also reveals that Harrison has won more whitewashes over this period than he has won deciders, a remarkable statistic in its own right.

== Personal life ==
Harrison is partially deaf, but much like American professional player Shane Van Boening, it doesn't hamper his game.

Among his main influences, Harrison counts six-time snooker World Champion Steve Davis as the biggest. He particularly admires Davis for his attitude, his consistency, and his quiet ruthlessness on the biggest of stages.

The nickname "The Farmer" originated in Harrison's youth; he both lived and worked on a family-run farm near Ely, Cambridgeshire, often arriving home after a long journey back from a pool event at the same time as his father was leaving for work.

Harrison takes a keen interest in fishing, and maintains his own fishing facility, named Mirror Lake, in Cambridgeshire. Phil's son George also features for Cambridgeshire's inter county team in the youth section and is one of their strongest players.
