= Craig Marsh =

Welsh pool player

Craig Marsh is a Welsh pool player who plays on the IPA tour.

Marsh was the IPA 2014 European Professional Champion.

== Titles ==
- 2025 Marine Globetrotters Sept Current In Off Champion
- 2017 IPA World Blackball Championship
- 2014 European Professional Championship
