= Desislava Bozhilova =

Bulgarian snooker referee

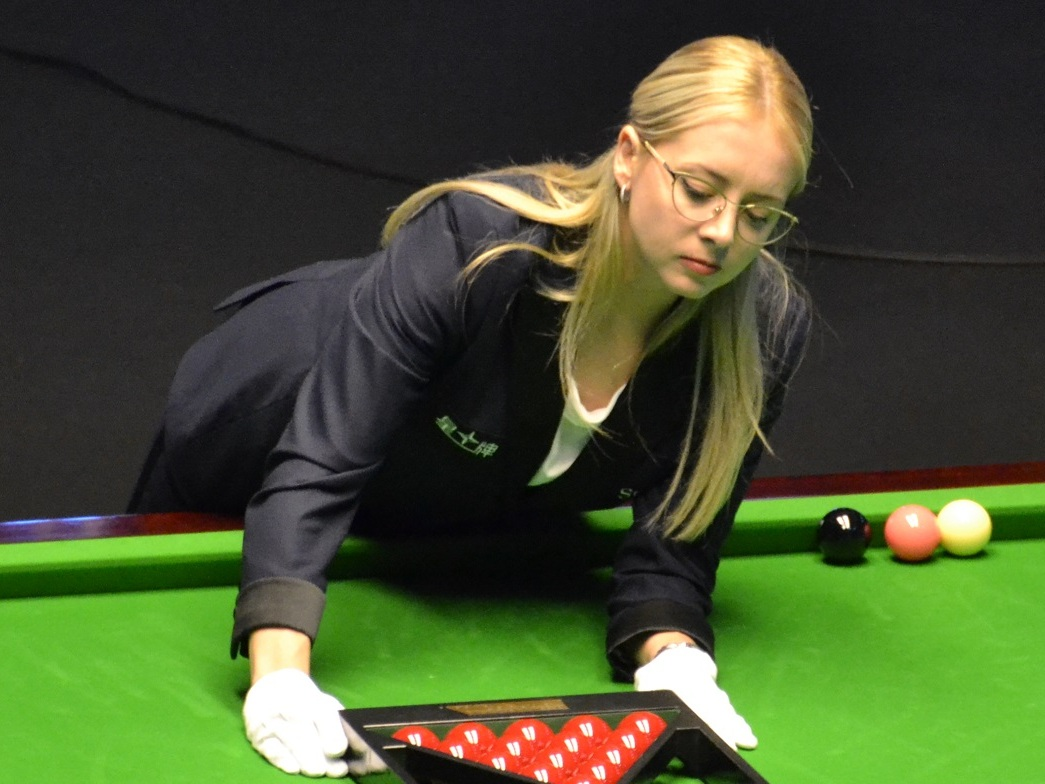
- At the 2023 European Masters, Germany

Personal information
- Born: 16 October 1992 (age 34) Sliven, Bulgaria

Sport
- Country: Bulgaria
- Sport: Snooker
- Professional: 2012–present

Desislava Vasileva Bozhilova (Bulgarian: Десислава Василева Божилова, born 16 October 1992) is a Bulgarian international snooker referee on the World Snooker Tour. Since passing the examination to become an international snooker referee, she has officiated ranking event finals as well as matches in the World Snooker Championship. She refereed her first Triple Crown final at the 2022 Masters, and the second at the 2022 UK Championship. She refereed the final of the 2025 World Snooker Championship, which made her the second woman, after Michaela Tabb, to referee a world final. She also became the first woman to referee the finals of all three Triple Crown events.

== Early life and education ==
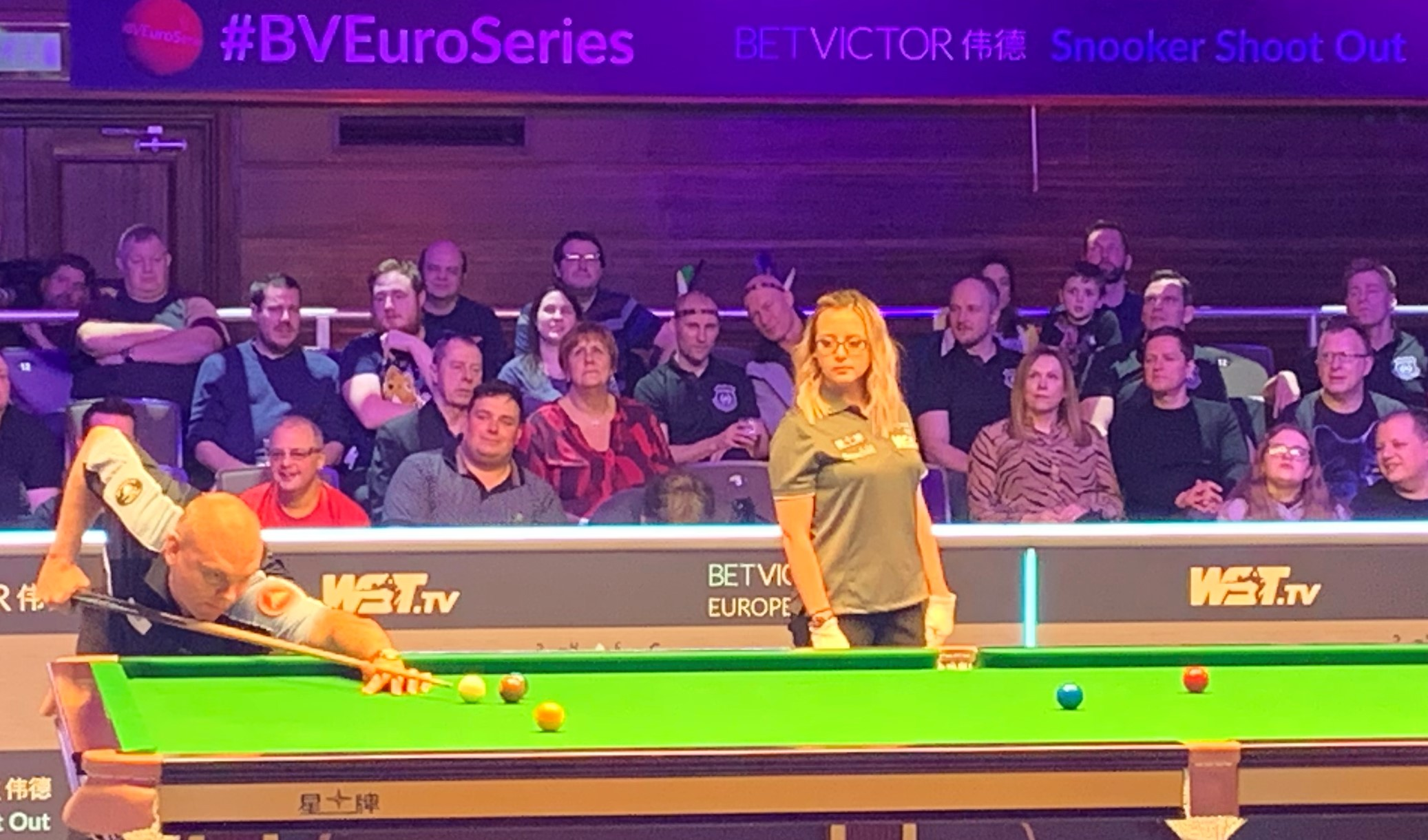
At the 2020 Snooker Shoot Out, England

Bozhilova was born and grew up in Sliven, Bulgaria, a city that does not have many people playing snooker. At the age of 13, Bozhilova began playing pool before becoming interested in snooker by watching it on television. She relocated to the Bulgarian capital of Sofia in 2012. Bozhilova holds a Master's degree in landscape architecture following her graduation from the University of Forestry, Sofia in 2016, and produces 3D visualisations of homes between snooker competitions.

== Career ==
Bozhilova learnt of the existence of the Bulgarian Snooker Referees Association in 2011, which helps people to become snooker referees, and she made the decision to get involved in it. She passed the examination to become an international snooker referee the following year, and refereed her first professional snooker tournament at the 2012 Bulgarian Open. She officiated her first ranking final at the 2016 Riga Masters, and has refereed other ranking finals such as in the English Open, German Masters, and the Players Championship.

Bozhilova officiated her first Triple Crown event match during the 2016 UK Championship, and made her debut at the main stages of the World Snooker Championship at the 2019 event. She was again selected to referee at the 2020 World Championship. She refereed her first Triple Crown final at the 2022 Masters, and her second at the 2022 UK Championship. She refereed the final of the 2025 World Snooker Championship, which made her the second woman, after Michaela Tabb, to referee a world final. She also became the first woman to referee the finals of all three Triple Crown events.

== See also ==
- List of snooker referees
