= Sabrilla Brunet =

French multiple time blackball pool champion, born 1982

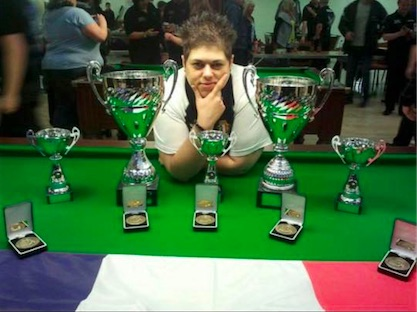

Personal information
- Born: 20 August 1982 (age 43) Lens, Pas-de-Calais

Pool career
- Country: France

Tournament wins
- World Champion: 2012, 2014, 2016, 2024

Sabrilla Brunet (born 20 August 1982 in Lens) is a French professional blackball player. She is a multiple time world and European blackball champion.

== Career ==
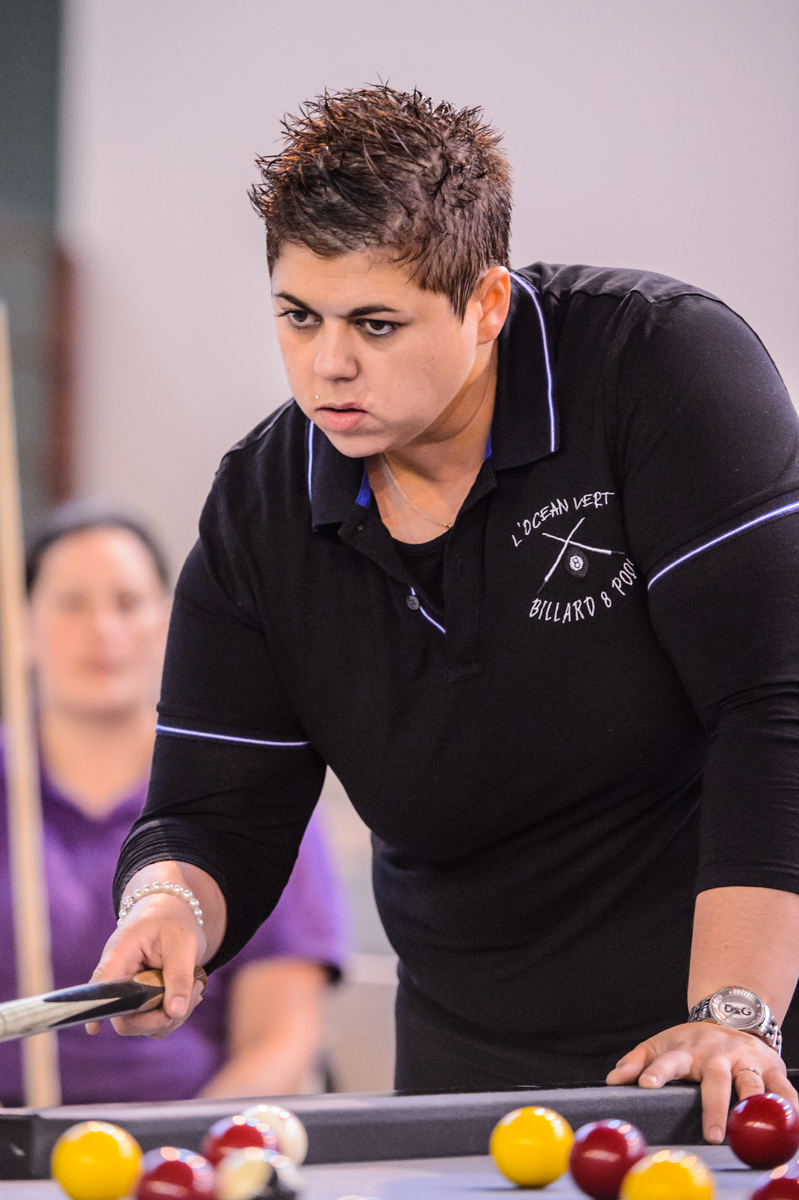

Brunet began playing billiards at the age of 15. Brunet won three consecutive world blackball championships in 2012, 2014 and 2016, then again in 2024. She was also a four time European blackball champion.

Nicknamed the gold star of billiards, she was also part of the women's French team champion of Europe and the World in 2013 and also the winning team in the European event in 2014.
