= European Pocket Billiard Federation =

European governing body for pocket billiards

- Abbreviation: EPBF
- Formation: November 1978
- Headquarters: Brunssum, Netherlands
- Region served: Europe
- Official language: English
- President: (Netherlands) Gre Leenders
- Affiliations: World Pool-Billiard Association
- Website: www.epbf.com

The European Pocket Billiard Federation (EPBF) is the European governing body for pocket billiards. EPBF is the European regional affiliate member of the World Pool-Billiard Association (WPA).

== Events ==
The federation holds the European Championships since 1980. and Euro Tour events since 1992.

1. Euro Tour
2. European Pool Championships

== Members ==
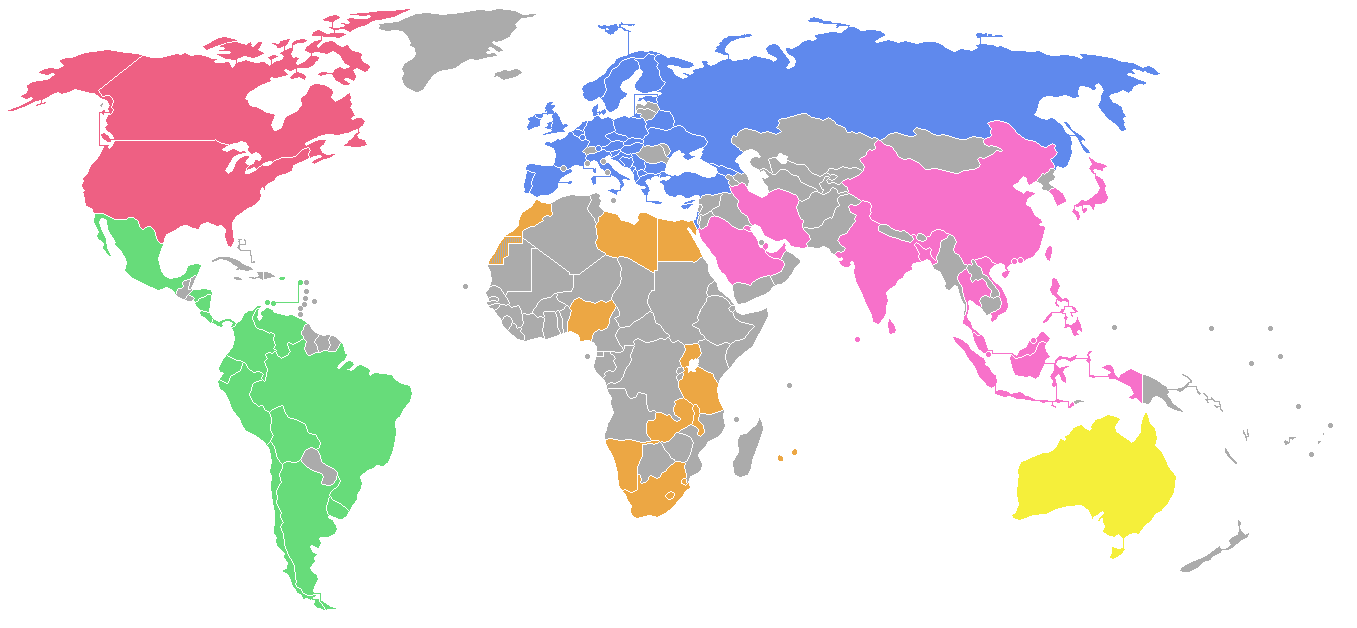
Map of WPA member countries (EPBF members in blue).

- ABSF – (Albania) Federata Shqiptare e Bilardos dhe Snookerit
- ÖEPBV – (Austria) Österreichischer Pool-Billard Verband
- ABF – (Azerbaijan) Azərbaycan Bilyard Federasiyası
- PBB – Pool-Billiard Belgium
- BABS – (Belarus) (suspended) Bielaruskaja Asacyjacyja Biĺjardnaha Sportu
- BSFBIH – (Bosnia and Herzegovina) Biljar & Snooker Federacija Bosne i Hercegovine
- NFB – (Bulgaria) Bŭlgarska Natsionalna Federatsiya po Bilyard
- HBS – (Croatia) Hrvatski Biljarski Savez
- KOBT – (Cyprus) Kypriakí Omospondía Biliárdou Tsépis
- CMBS – (Czech Republic) Ceskomoravsky Billiardovy Svaz
- DDBU – (Denmark) Den Danske Billard Union
- EPD – (Estonia) Eesti Piljardiliit
- NPAF – (Faroe Islands) Landspuljafelag Føroya
- SBL – (Finland) Suomen Biljardiliitto
- FFB – (France) Federacion Francaise de Billard
- SBEP – (Georgia (country)) Sakartvelos Biliardis Erovnuli Pederatsia
- DBU – (Germany) Deutsche Billard Union
- BPF – (United Kingdom) British Pool Federation
- MBS – (Hungary) Magyar Biliárd Szövetség
- BSI – (Iceland) Billiardsamband Islands
- ICF – (Republic of Ireland) (provisional) Irish Cuesport Federation
- FIBIS – (Italy) Federazione Italiana Sport Billiardo & Bowling
- BSK – (Kosovo) Bilijarski Savez Kosova
- LRBF – (Latvia) Latvijas Republikas Biljarda Federācija
- BVFL – Billardverband Fürstentum Liechtenstein
- LPF – (Lithuania) Lietuvos Pulo Federacija
- FLAB – (Luxembourg) Fed. Luxembourgeoise des Amateurs de Billard
- KNBB – (Netherlands) Koninklijke Nederlandse Biljart Bond
- BFNM – (North Macedonia) Bilijard Federacija na Severna Makedonija
- NBF – (Norway) Norges Biljardforbund
- PZB – (Poland) Polski Związek Bilardowy
- FPB – (Portugal) Federação Portuguesa de Bilhar
- ACDB – (Romania) (provisional) Asociatia Cluburilor De Billard
- FBSRF – (Russia) (suspended) Federatsiya Bil'yardnogo Sporta Rossiya
- SBA – (Serbia) Bilijarski Savez Srbije
- SBIZ – (Slovakia) Slovenská Biliardová Federácia
- ZZBSS – (Slovenia) Zveza za Žepni Biljard in Snooker Slovenije
- RFEB – (Spain) Real Federación Española de Billar
- SBF – (Sweden) Svenska Biljardförbundet
- SBV – (Switzerland) Schweizer Billardverbandes
- TBF – (Turkey) Türkiye Bilardo Federasyonu
- KKTBF – (Northern Cyprus) Kuzey Kıbrıs Türk Bilardo Federasyonu
- FSBU – (Ukraine) Federatsiya Sportyvnoho Bilʹyardu Ukrayiny
