= Gareth Potts =

English pool player

Personal information
- Nickname: The Golden Boy
- Born: 30 June 1983 (age 43) Stoke-on-Trent, England, UK
- Website: http://www.HomeLeisureDirect.com/gareth_potts/

Pool career
- Country: England
- Turned pro: 2000–present
- Pool games: British-style eight-ball (B8B); Chinese eight-ball (C8B)

Tournament wins
- Major: 3-time C8B masters champion
- Minor: 2-time B8B junior world champion
- World Champion: 4-time B8B world champion

Gareth David Potts (born 30 June 1983) is an English pool player, nicknamed "the Golden Boy". He is a two-time amateur and four-time professional world champion in British-style eightball/blackball, a co-champion in that discipline's pairs (doubles) event, and a three-time champion of the Chinese 8 Ball Masters.

== Career ==
Turning professional in 2000, he won the 2000 and 2001 Junior World Pool Championships.

He won the WEPF World Eightball Championship three times, in 2005, 2007 and 2008, and was IPA World Blackball Professional Champion in 2014.

Potts won the Chinese 8 Ball Masters in 2013, beating Chris Melling 17–9 in the best-of-33 final. He successfully defended the Chinese 8 Ball Masters in 2014 by beating Shi Hanqing 15–6 in a match lasting 2 hours and 10 minutes. As of 2015, Potts has concentrated his career on Chinese eight-ball pool.

In 2021, Potts joined the Ultimate Pool circuit, a professional tour in the UK, in which his first win was Pro Series 7 (3–4 December 2021). In that tournament, he defeated Rob Wharne 7–4, Karl Sutton 7–6, Greg Batten 7–4, Chris Melling 7–5, and Shaun Storry 9–4. In 2022, Potts and Mark Selby took the Ultimate Pool Pairs Cup Championship.

=== Sponsorships ===
Potts first signed a contract with Joy Billiard, to sponsor him in the Chinese 8 Ball Masters tournament. He is also sponsored by the Finnish chalk, glove, and tip company TAOM Billiards.

Since 2010, pool table retailer Home Leisure Direct has sponsored Potts; through them, he offers coaching services, as well as instructional videos.

== Achievements ==
- 2000 Junior World Pool Championships
- 2001 Junior World Pool Championships
- 2005 WEPF World Eightball Championship
- 2007 WEPF World Eightball Championship
- 2008 WEPF World Eightball Championship
- 2013 Chinese 8 Ball Masters
- 2014 Chinese 8 Ball Masters
- 2014 IPA World Blackball Professional Championship
- 2017 Chinese 8 Ball Masters
- 2022 Ultimate Pool Pairs Cup Championship (with Mark Selby)
- 2024 O’Min Cuelees Duya Legends Golden Nine Masters
