= Chris Melling (pool player) =

English pool and snooker player

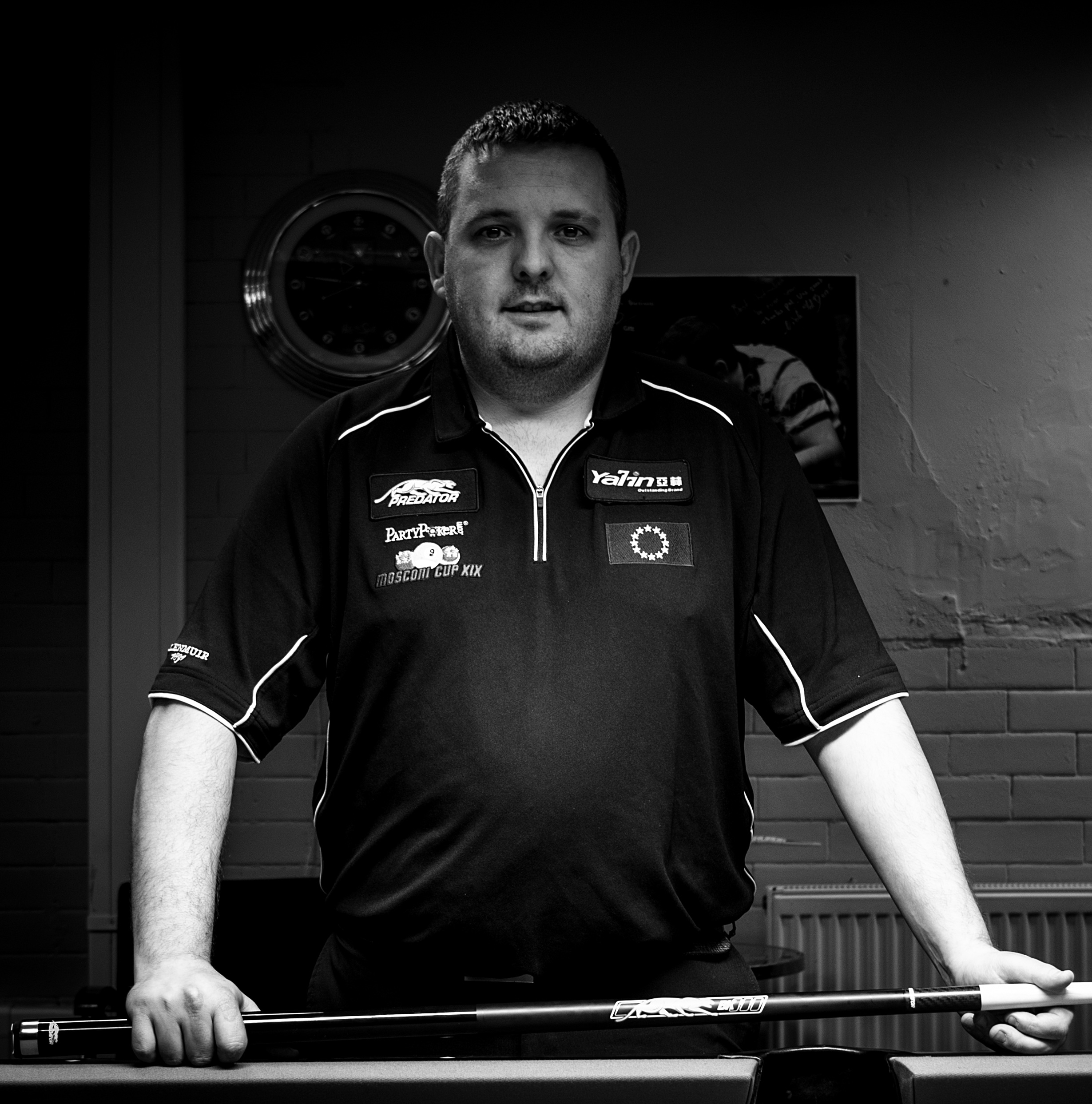
- Melling in 2012

Personal information
- Nickname: The Magician
- Born: 27 January 1979 (age 47) Keighley, Bradford, West Yorkshire

Sport
- Country: England
- Sport: Snooker
- Professional: 1998
- Best ranking finish: Quarter finals 2013 WPA World Nine-ball Championship

Tournament wins
- World Championship: English eight-ball (2001, 2003)

Christopher Melling (born 27 January 1979) is an English professional pool and snooker player from Keighley, Bradford, West Yorkshire. He is a former world number 1 at World Rules British Eight-Ball. He won the WEPF World Eightball Championship twice, in 2001 and 2003. He was ranked #1 in 2003 by the World Eightball Pool Federation. Melling has also twice won the International Pool Masters (2001 and 2002) and the European Professional title (2002). He was the first player to win two International Tour events back to back.

== Career ==
In 2001, Melling reached the last 16 of the 2001 WPA World Nine-ball Championship in Cardiff, defeating Steve Davis along the way.

In October 2010, Melling won his first European nine-ball event, the Portugal Open. On 12 June 2011, he was crowned China Open champion and received $40,000. This was his first major nine-ball tournament victory.

In December 2011, Melling participated in the 18th annual Mosconi Cup, winning four of his six matches. A year later he won the Most Valuable Player Award in the 2012 Mosconi Cup.

In January 2013, he reached the final of the Chinese 8-Ball Masters, losing to Gareth Potts. He also lost to Potts in the final of the 2005 World Rules 8-Ball Championship. Also in 2013, he reached the quarter-finals of the 2013 WPA World Nine-ball Championship, the World Masters, and the World Cup of Pool, and finished fifth in the US Open 9-Ball Championship.

In May 2014, Melling entered the snooker 2014 Q School in an attempt to regain his professional status and defeated the likes of former professionals Daniel Wells and Chen Zhe 4–3 and 4–1 respectively, before winning his quarter-final match against Duane Jones 4–3 to earn a two-year tour card for the 2014–15 and 2015–16 seasons.

In his first match as a professional, he defeated 2003 UK Championship winner Matthew Stevens 5–4 to qualify for the 2014 Wuxi Classic, but lost 5–1 to Zhao Xintong in the first round. Melling also played in the first round of the International Championship by defeating Luca Brecel 6–5 and was knocked out 6–1 by Zhou Yuelong. His first victory at the venue stage of a ranking event came at the Welsh Open after edging out Nigel Bond 4–3, before being whitewashed 4–0 by home favourite Michael White in the second round.

The 2015–16 season proved harder for Melling as he won only four matches during the season. He dropped off the tour at the end of the season and could not win enough matches at the 2016 Q School to regain his place.

In July 2024, Melling won the Ultimate Pool Masters.

== Snooker performance and rankings timeline ==
Tournament	2000/ 01	2001/ 02	2002/ 03	2003/ 04	2004/ 05	2006/ 07	2014/ 15	2015/ 16
Ranking (Note: From the 2010/2011 season it shows the ranking at the beginning of the season.)	(Note: He was an amateur.)	(Note: New players on the Main Tour do not have a ranking)						79
Ranking tournaments
Australian Goldfields Open	Tournament Not Held						LQ	A
Shanghai Masters	Tournament Not Held						LQ	LQ
International Championship	Tournament Not Held						1R	LQ
UK Championship	A	LQ	A	LQ	A	LQ	1R	1R
German Masters	Tournament Not Held						LQ	LQ
Welsh Open	A	LQ	A	LQ	A	LQ	2R	1R
World Grand Prix	Tournament Not Held						NR	DNQ
Players Tour Championship Finals	Tournament Not Held						DNQ	DNQ
China Open	A	LQ	Not Held		A	LQ	LQ	LQ
World Championship	LQ	LQ	LQ	LQ	LQ	LQ	LQ	LQ
Non-ranking tournaments
The Masters	A	A	A	LQ	A	A	A	A
Former ranking tournaments
Thailand Masters	A	LQ	NR	Not Held		NR	Not Held	
Scottish Open (Note: The event was called the Players Championship (2003/2004))	A	LQ	A	LQ	Tournament Not Held			
British Open	A	LQ	A	LQ	A	Not Held		
Irish Masters	NR		A	LQ	A	NR	Not Held	
Malta Cup (Note: The event was also called the European Open (2001/2002–2003/2004))	NR	LQ	A	LQ	A	LQ	Not Held	
Northern Ireland Trophy	Tournament Not Held					LQ	Not Held	
Grand Prix (Note: The event was also called the LG Cup (2001/2002–2003/2004))	A	LQ	A	LQ	A	LQ	Not Held	
Wuxi Classic (Note: The event was called the Jiangsu Classic (2008/2009–2009/2010))	Tournament Not Held						1R	NH
Indian Open	Tournament Not Held						LQ	NH

Performance table legend
LQ	lost in the qualifying draw	#R	lost in the early rounds of the tournament (WR = Wildcard round, RR = Round robin)	QF	lost in the quarter-finals
SF	lost in the semi-finals	F	lost in the final	W	won the tournament
DNQ	did not qualify for the tournament	A	did not participate in the tournament	WD	withdrew from the tournament

NH / Not Held	means an event was not held.
NR / Non-Ranking Event	means an event is/was no longer a ranking event.
R / Ranking Event	means an event is/was a ranking event.
MR / Minor-Ranking Event	means an event is/was a minor-ranking event.
PA / Pro-am Event	means an event is/was a pro-am event.

== Pool titles ==
- 2024 Ultimate Pool Kansas City Open 8-Ball
- 2024 Ultimate Pool Masters 8-Ball
- 2024 Ultimate Pool Louisiana Open 8-Ball
- 2021 Ultimate Pool Champion of Champions 8-Ball
- 2019 IPT Ultimate Pool Series Blackball
- 2018 Derby City Classic 9-Ball
- 2018 World Pool Series 8-Ball Classic
- 2017 Derby City Classic 14.1 Challenge
- 2012 Mosconi Cup (MVP)
- 2012 Mosconi Cup
- 2011 Mosconi Cup
- 2011 China Open 9-Ball Championship
- 2010 Euro Tour Portugal Open
- 2005 Snooker International Open Series
- 2003 WEPF World Eightball Championship
- 2002 Snooker Challenge Tour
- 2001 WEPF World Eightball Championship
