= Shi Hanqing =

Chinese pool and snooker player

Personal information
- Born: 19 August 1990 (age 36) Tianjin, China

Sport
- Country: China
- Sport: Snooker
- Professional: 2013/2014
- Highest ranking: 121 (September–December 2013)

Shi Hanqing (Chinese: 石汉青, born 19 August 1990) is a Chinese pool player and former professional snooker player.

== Snooker career ==
Shi first appeared at a ranking event at age of 19, playing Matthew Selt in the wildcard round of the 2009 Shanghai Masters in which he was whitewashed 0–5.

In the 2012–13 season he appeared in the three Asian events in that year's Players Tour Championship In APTC Event 1, he reached the last 64 where he was knocked out by Stephen Lee by a scoreline of 1–4, and reached the last 16 in events 2 and 3, being defeated by professionals Barry Hawkins and Ken Doherty to scorelines of 2-4 and 0-4 respectively.

He turned professional in time for the 2013–14 season by virtue of finishing 3rd in the APTC Order of Merit from the previous season. However, Shi did not enter any ranking tournaments other than the three Asian PTC events he entered the previous season; his best finishes were the last 64 in events 1 and 2 where he lost Liam Highfield and Jin Long; he also entered event 3 but withdrew from the event. He did not renew his WPBSA membership for the following season and dropped off the main tour.

== Pool career ==
Aside from snooker, Shi has had a successful pool career. In 2016, he was the winner of the WPA World Heyball Championship, defeating Mick Hill by a scoreline of 21–20.

== Performance and rankings timeline ==
Tournament	2009/ 10	2012/ 13	2013/ 14
Ranking (Note: It shows the ranking at the beginning of the season.)	(Note: He was an amateur.)		(Note: New players on the Main Tour don't have a ranking.)
Ranking tournaments
Wuxi Classic	NR	A	A
Australian Goldfields Open	NH	A	A
Shanghai Masters	WR	A	A
Indian Open	Not Held		A
International Championship	NH	A	A
UK Championship	A	A	A
German Masters	NH	A	A
Welsh Open	A	A	A
Players Tour Championship Finals	NH	DNQ	DNQ
World Open	A	A	A
China Open	A	A	A
World Championship	A	A	A

Performance Table Legend
LQ	lost in the qualifying draw	#R	lost in the early rounds of the tournament (WR = Wildcard round, RR = Round robin)	QF	lost in the quarter-finals
SF	lost in the semi-finals	F	lost in the final	W	won the tournament
DNQ	did not qualify for the tournament	A	did not participate in the tournament	WD	withdrew from the tournament

NH / Not Held	means an event was not held.
NR / Non-Ranking Event	means an event is/was no longer a ranking event.
R / Ranking Event	means an event is/was a ranking event.
MR / Minor-Ranking Event	means an event is/was a minor-ranking event.

== Pool titles ==
- 2016 WPA World Heyball Championship
