= International Eightball Pool Federation =

IEPF logo

The International Eightball Pool Federation (IEPF), formerly called the World Eightball Pool Federation (WEPF), is an international pool governing body overseeing international tournaments and rankings in the British-originating variant of eight-ball pool played with red and yellow unnumbered balls instead of the stripes and solids numbered balls. Since 2024, the IEPF has been an affiliate of the World Pool-Billiard Association (WPA), which oversees its own tournaments and slightly different rules under the name blackball. IEPF events are held principally in the United Kingdom and Commonwealth of Nations.

== Overview ==
The WEPF was established in 1992 by founding member countries Australia, England, and New Zealand. The group was separate from the WPA, and organised its own world championships and other tournaments initially held in the UK using a WEPF ruleset commonly known as "world rules".

In 2023, the then-WEPF adopted the "international rules" used by Ultimate Pool. Upon affiliating with the WPA in August 2024, the WEPF changed its name to the IEBF.

Each country under the IEPF has their own referee and umpire body, and each country has their own qualification structure in place for grading referees. For instance, South Africa has three basic certificates: League Referee, Provincial Referee and National Referee.

== Member countries ==
19 Member nations:

- Australia – Australian Eight Ball Federation
- Belgium
- China
- Cyprus
- England – English Pool Association
- France and Reunion Island
- Guernsey
- India
- Ireland
- Japan
- Malta
- Mauritius
- Morocco
- New Zealand – Clubs New Zealand 8Ball
- Northern Ireland
- Portugal
- Scotland
- South Africa – Pool South Africa
- Wales

== World Eightball Pool Championship ==
The WEPF World Eightball Pool Championship (sometimes branded the Foster's World Eightball Pool Championship for sponsorship purposes) is held annually, and features open, women's, and juniors' divisions. For many years the tournaments were held at the Imperial Hotel in Blackpool, England. The competition includes players from Europe and from further afield, including Australia and South Africa.

== See also ==
- List of world eight-ball champions
