= Eight-ball =

Pool game popular in much of the world

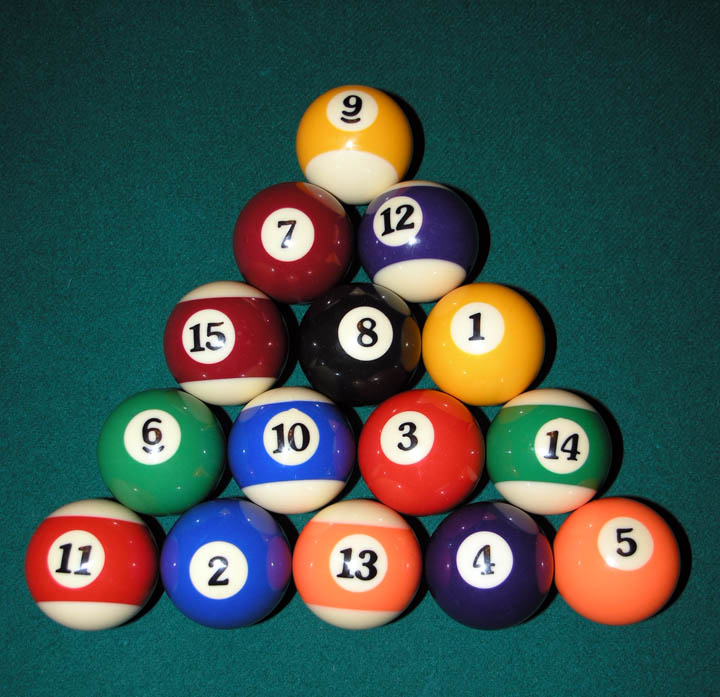
- One of numerous proper racks in standardized eight-ball: The two rear corner balls are of different suits, the 8 ball is in the center, and the apex ball is on the foot spot.
- Highest governing body: World Pool Association
- First played: 1900s

Characteristics
- Contact: No
- Team members: single competitors or doubles
- Mixed-sex: Yes
- Equipment: Cue sports equipment
- Glossary: glossary of cue sports terms

Presence
- Country or region: Worldwide

Eight-ball (also spelled 8-ball or eightball, and sometimes called solids and stripes, spots and stripes, bigs and smalls, big ones and little ones, or rarely highs and lows) is a discipline of pool played on a billiard table with six pockets, cue sticks, and sixteen billiard balls (a cue ball and fifteen object balls). The object balls include seven solid-colored balls numbered 1 through 7, seven striped balls numbered 9 through 15, and the black 8 ball. After the balls are scattered with a break shot, a player is assigned either the group of solid or striped balls once they have legally pocketed a ball from that group. The object of the game is to legally pocket the 8-ball in a "called" pocket, which can only be done after all of the balls from a player's assigned group have been cleared from the table.

The game is the most frequently played discipline of pool and is often thought of as synonymous with "pool". The game has numerous variations, mostly regional. It is the second most played professional pool game, after nine-ball, and for the last several decades ahead of straight pool.

== History ==
The game of eight-ball arose around 1900 in the United States as a development of pyramid pool, which allows any eight of the fifteen object balls to be pocketed to win. The game arose from two changes made, namely that the 8 ball must be pocketed last to win, and that each player may pocket only half of the other object balls. By 1925, the game was popular enough for the Brunswick-Balke-Collender Company to introduce purpose-made ball sets with seven red, seven yellow, one black ball, and the cue ball, which allowed spectators to more easily see which suit each ball belonged to. (Such colors became standard in the later British-originating variant.) The rules, as officially codified in the Billiard Congress of America's rule book, were periodically revised in the years following.

== Standardized rules of play ==
American-style eight-ball is played around the world by professionals and in many amateur leagues. Nevertheless, the rules for eight-ball may be the most inconsistent of any billiard game, as there are several competing sets of "official" rules.

The World Pool-Billiard Association (WPA), the governing body of pool which has continental and national affiliates around the world, promulgates standardized rules as Pool Billiards – The Rules of Play. These are used for amateur and professional play.

Meanwhile, many amateur leagues – such as the American Poolplayers Association (APA) and its affiliate the Canadian Poolplayers Association (CPA), the Valley National Eight-ball Association (VNEA) and the BCA Pool League (BCAPL) – use their own rulesets which have slight differences from WPA rules and from each other. Millions of individuals play casually, using informal "house rules" which vary not only from area to area but even from venue to venue.

=== Equipment ===
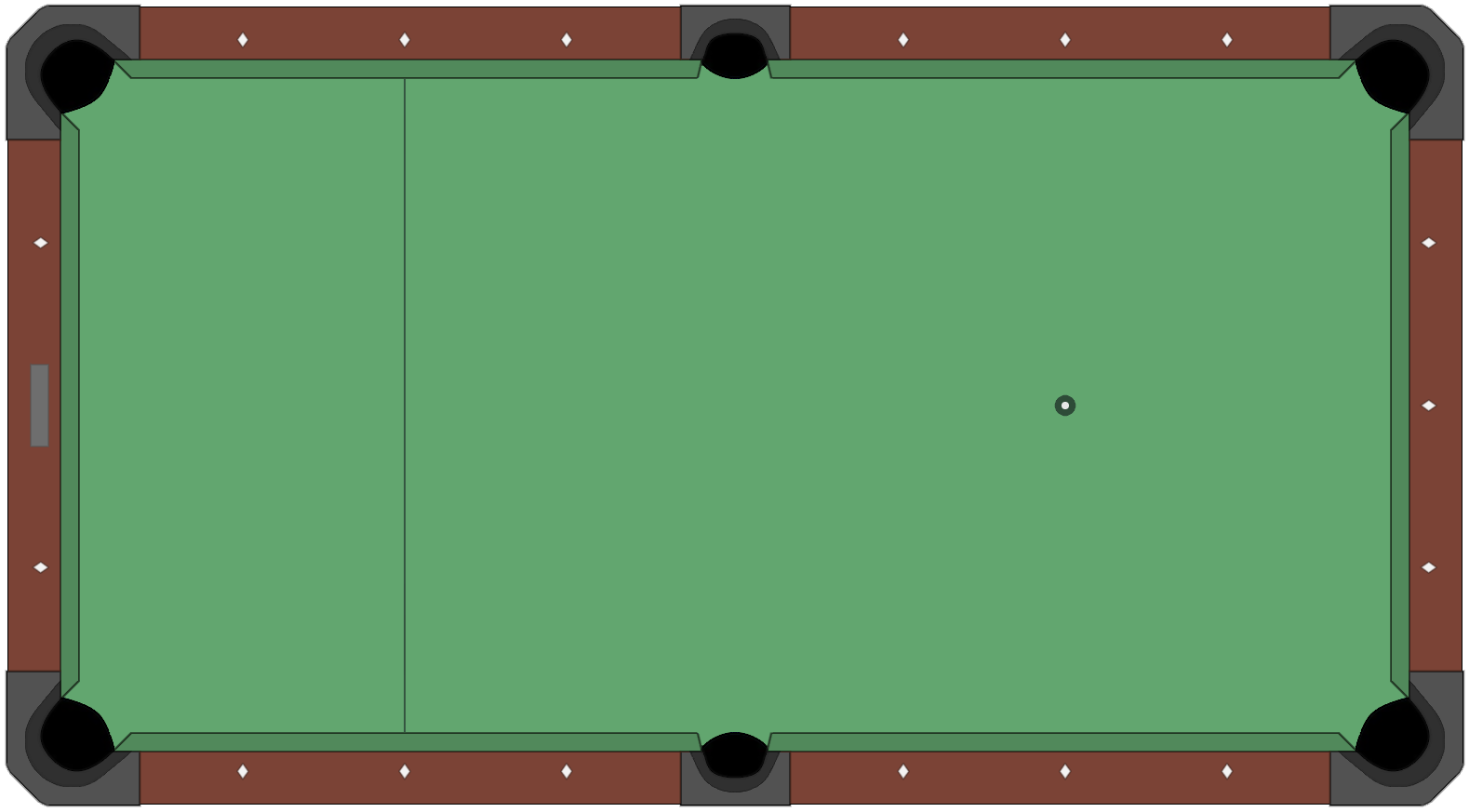
Plan view of an American style pool table

The regulation size of a table's playing surface is 9 by 4.5 ft (2.7 by 1.4 m), with the between-cushion area being 100 by 50 in (250 by 130 cm), though exact dimensions may vary slightly by manufacturer. Some leagues and tournaments using the World Standardized Rules may allow smaller sizes, down to 7 by 3.5 ft (2.1 by 1.1 m). Early 20th-century 10 by 5 ft (3.0 by 1.5 m) models are occasionally also still used. Professional competition generally employs regulation tables, while the amateur championships of various leagues, including BCAPL, VNEA, and APA, use the seven-foot tables to fit more of them into the hosting venue.

There are seven solid-colored balls numbered 1 through 7, seven striped balls numbered 9 through 15, an 8 ball, and a cue ball. The balls are usually colored as follows:

1	solid yellow	9	yellow stripe
2	solid blue	10	blue stripe
3	solid red	11	red stripe
4	solid purple	12	purple stripe
5	solid orange	13	orange stripe
6	solid green	14	green stripe
7	solid maroon	15	maroon stripe
8	solid black	•	cue ball, white

Special sets designed to be more easily discernible on television substitute pink for the dark purple of the 4 and 12 and light tan for the darker maroon of the 7 and 15 balls, and these alternative-color sets are now also available to consumers.

=== Setup ===
To start the game, the object balls are placed in a triangular rack. The base of the rack is parallel to the end rail (the short end of the pool table) and positioned so the apex ball of the rack is located on the foot spot. The balls in the rack are ideally placed so that they are all in contact with one another; this is accomplished by pressing the balls together toward the apex ball. The order of the balls should be random, with the exceptions of the 8-ball, which must be placed in the center of the rack (i.e., the middle of the third row), and the two back corner balls, one of which must be a stripe and the other a solid. The cue ball is placed anywhere the breaker desires behind the head string.

=== Break ===
One person is chosen by some predetermined method (e.g., coin toss, lag, or win or loss of previous game or match) to shoot first, using the cue ball to break the object-ball rack apart. In most leagues, it is the breaker's opponent who racks the balls, but in some, players break their own racks. If the breaker fails to make a successful break—usually defined as at least four balls hitting cushions (if four balls hit cushions then it is open table unless a foul occurs on a break as said above) or an object ball being pocketed—then the opponent can opt either to play from the current position or to call for a re-rack and either re-break or have the original breaker repeat the break.

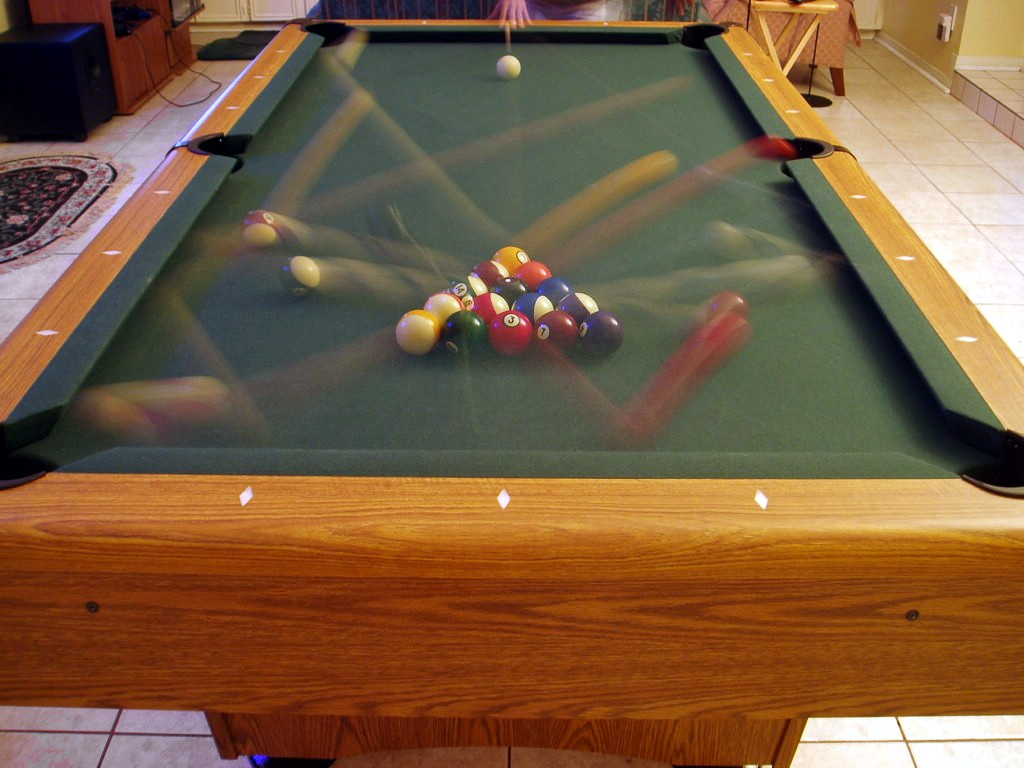
Long-exposure photograph of a break in eight-ball

If the 8 ball is pocketed on the break, then the breaker can choose either to re-spot the 8 ball and play from the current position or to re-rack and re-break; but if the cue ball is also pocketed on the break (colloquially referred to as a "scratch") then the opponent is the one who has the choice: either to re-spot the 8 ball and shoot with ball-in-hand behind the head string, accepting the current position, or to re-break or have the breaker re-break.

=== Turn-taking ===
A player (or team) continues to shoot until committing a foul or failing to legally pocket an object ball (whether intentionally or not); thereupon it is the turn of the opposing players. Play alternates in this manner for the remainder of the game. Following a foul, the incoming player has ball-in-hand anywhere on the table, unless the foul occurred on the break shot, as noted previously.

=== Selection of the target group ===
The table is "open" at the start of the game, meaning that either player may shoot at any ball. It remains open until one player legally pockets any called ball other than the 8 after the break. That player is assigned the group, or suit, of the pocketed ball – 1 to 7 (solids) or 9 to 15 (stripes) – and the other suit is assigned to the opponent. Balls pocketed on the break, or as the result of a foul while the table is still open, are not used to assign the suits. Once the suits are assigned, they remain fixed throughout the game. If any balls from a player's suit are on the table, the player must hit one of them first on every shot; otherwise a foul is called and the turn ends. After all balls from the suit have been pocketed, the player's target becomes the 8 for the remainder of the game.

=== Pocketing the 8 ball ===
Once all of a player's (or team's) group of object balls are pocketed, the player attempts to sink the 8 ball. To win the game, the player first designates which pocket the 8 ball will be pocketed into and then successfully pockets the 8 ball into that pocket. If the player knocks the 8 ball off the table, the player loses the game. If the player pockets the 8 ball and commits a foul or pockets it into another pocket than the one designated, the player loses the game. Otherwise (i.e., if the 8 ball is neither pocketed nor knocked off the table), the shooter's turn is simply over, even if a foul occurs. In short, a world-standardized rules game of eight-ball, like a game of nine-ball, is not over until the "money ball" is no longer on the table. The rule has been increasingly adopted by amateur leagues.

=== Winning ===
A player wins the game if that player legally pockets the 8 ball into a designated pocket after all of their object balls have been pocketed. Because of this, it is possible for a game to end with only one of the players having shot, which is known as "running the table" or a "denial"; conversely, it's also possible to win a game without taking a shot; such a scenario may occur if the opposing player illegally pockets the 8 ball on any shot other than the break (such as sinking the 8 ball in an uncalled pocket, knocking the 8 ball off the table, sinking the 8 ball when a player is not yet on the black ball, or sinking both the 8 ball and the cue ball off a single shot). The rules on what happens when the 8 ball is pocketed off the break vary by the rules in question.

=== Fouls ===
The general rules of pool apply to eight-ball, such as the requirements that the cue ball not be pocketed and that a cushion be hit by any of the balls after the cue ball has struck an object ball. Fouls specific to eight-ball are:

- The shooter fails to strike one of their own object balls (or the 8 ball when it is the legal ball) with the cue ball, before other balls are contacted by the cue ball. This excludes "split" shots, where the cue ball strikes one of the shooter's and one of the opponent's object balls simultaneously.
- If an attempt is made to pocket a ball, and the ball hits the pocket, bounces out and lands on the ground, the ball is placed in the pocket and the game continues.
- The shooter shoots the black 8 ball without designating the pocket to opposite team members or the match referee in advance.
- The shooter deliberately pockets the opponent's balls while shooting the 8 ball.
- On the break shot, no balls are pocketed and fewer than four balls reach the cushions, in which case the incoming player can demand a re-rack and take the break or force the original breaker to re-break, or may take ball-in-hand behind the head string and shoot the balls as they lie.

== Variants ==
=== British-style eightball ===
The British version of eight-ball, known internationally as either blackball or simply "eightball", has evolved into a separate game, retaining significant elements of earlier pub versions of the game, with additional influences from English billiards and snooker. It is popular in amateur and professional competition in the UK, Ireland, Australia, and some other countries.

The game uses unnumbered, solid-colored object balls, typically red and yellow, with one black 8 ball. They are usually 2 inches (51 mm) or 2 1/16 inches (52 mm) in diameter, the latter being the same size as the balls used in snooker and English billiards. Tables are usually 7-foot (2.1 m) long, and feature pockets with rounded cushion openings, like snooker tables. Smaller 6-foot (1.8 m) tables are sometimes used in places where a larger table would be too large.

The rules of British eightball differ from standard eight-ball in numerous ways, including the handling of fouls, which historically gives the opponent two shots in some rule sets, racking (the 8 ball, not the apex ball, goes on the spot), selection of which group of balls will be shot by which player, handling of frozen balls and snookers, and many other details.

Internationally, the World Pool-Billiard Association and the International Eightball Pool Federation both publish rules and promote events. The two rule sets differ in some details regarding the penalties for fouls.

=== Chinese eight-ball (Heyball) ===
This version of eight-ball originating in China uses rules that are essentially the same as standard WPA rules and the game is played with standard 2 1/4-inch (57 mm) solids-and-stripes balls. However, the tables are constructed similarly to 9-foot (2.7 m) snooker tables, with rounded pocket openings, napped cloth and flat-faced rail cushions. This results in some differences in gameplay approach. The variant arose in the mid-1980s and 1990s as eight-ball gained popularity in China, where snooker was the most popular cue sport at the time. With standard American-style pool tables rare, Chinese players made do with playing eight-ball on small snooker tables. It has since become the most popular cue sport in China, and the major tournaments have some of the largest prize money in pool.

=== Eight-ball rotation ===
The hybrid game eight-ball rotation is a combination of eight-ball and rotation, in which the players must pocket their balls (other than the 8, which remains last) in numerical order. Specifically, the solids player starts by pocketing the 1 ball and ascends to the 7 ball, and the stripes player starts by pocketing the 15 ball and descends to the 9 ball.

=== Backwards eight-ball ===
Backwards eight-ball, also called reverse eight-ball, is a variant in which, instead of shooting the cue ball at an object ball to force the object ball into a pocket, the player strikes the object ball with their cue so that it caroms off the cue ball and into a pocket, in a fashion similar to Russian pyramid.

== See also ==
- List of World Eight-ball Champions

== Note ==
- Dyer, R. A. (May 2005). Billiards, Revised and Updated: The Official Rules And Records Book. Billiard Congress of America / Rowman & Littlefield. ISBN 978-1-59228-744-4.
