= Eight-ball pool (British variation) =

Pool game

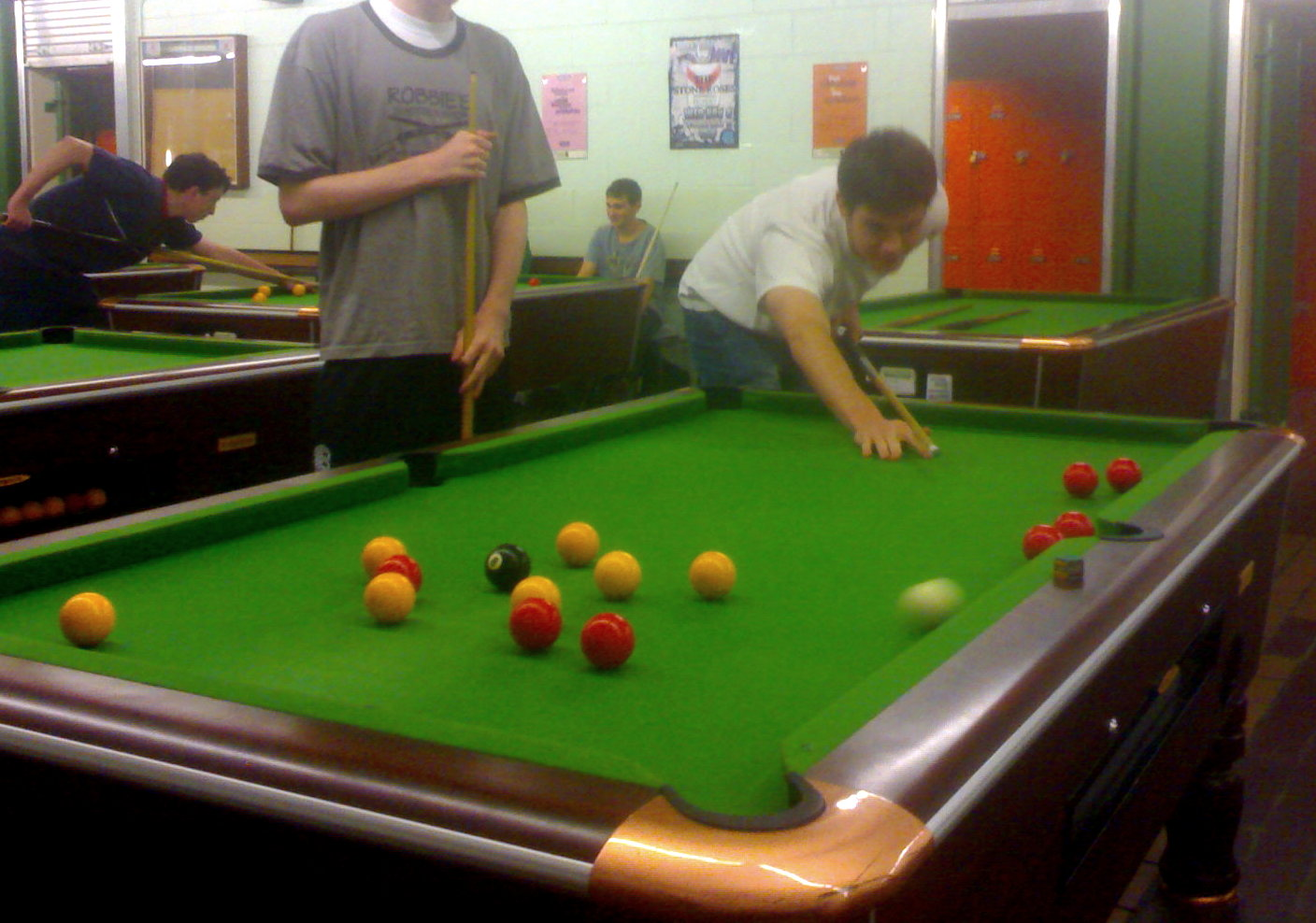
A player shooting a kick shot

The English-originating version of eight-ball pool, also known as English pool, English eight-ball, blackball, or simply reds and yellows, is a pool game played with sixteen balls (a cue ball and fifteen usually unnumbered object balls) on a small pool table with six pockets. It originated in the United Kingdom and is played in the Commonwealth countries such as Australia, Ireland, and South Africa. In the UK and Ireland it is usually called simply "pool", while the term "blackball" is common in other regions to distinguish it from the American-originated eight-ball.

The English version of eight-ball has two main sets of playing rules used in professional play; those of the World Pool-Billiard Association (WPA), known as "blackball rules", and the "International Rules" adopted by the International Eightball Pool Federation (IEPF, formerly known as the World Eightball Pool Federation (WEPF) prior to 2024).

== History ==
American-style eight-ball arose around 1900, derived from basic pyramid pool. In 1925, the Brunswick-Balke-Collender Company began offering ball sets specifically for the game using unnumbered yellow and red balls (in contrast to the numbered solids and stripes found in most pool ball sets), a black eight ball, and the white cue ball. These were introduced to make it easier for spectators to identify the two sets in early professional games held in casinos, and became known as "casino-style" sets. In the years following World War II, playing eight-ball on small coin-operated pool tables became a common pub game in American and Canadian bars, a pastime which spread to Britain by the early 1960s. In the years following, the British game diverged from the American in equipment (including the use of casino-style balls, which had died out in the US and Canada) and rules.

== Equipment ==
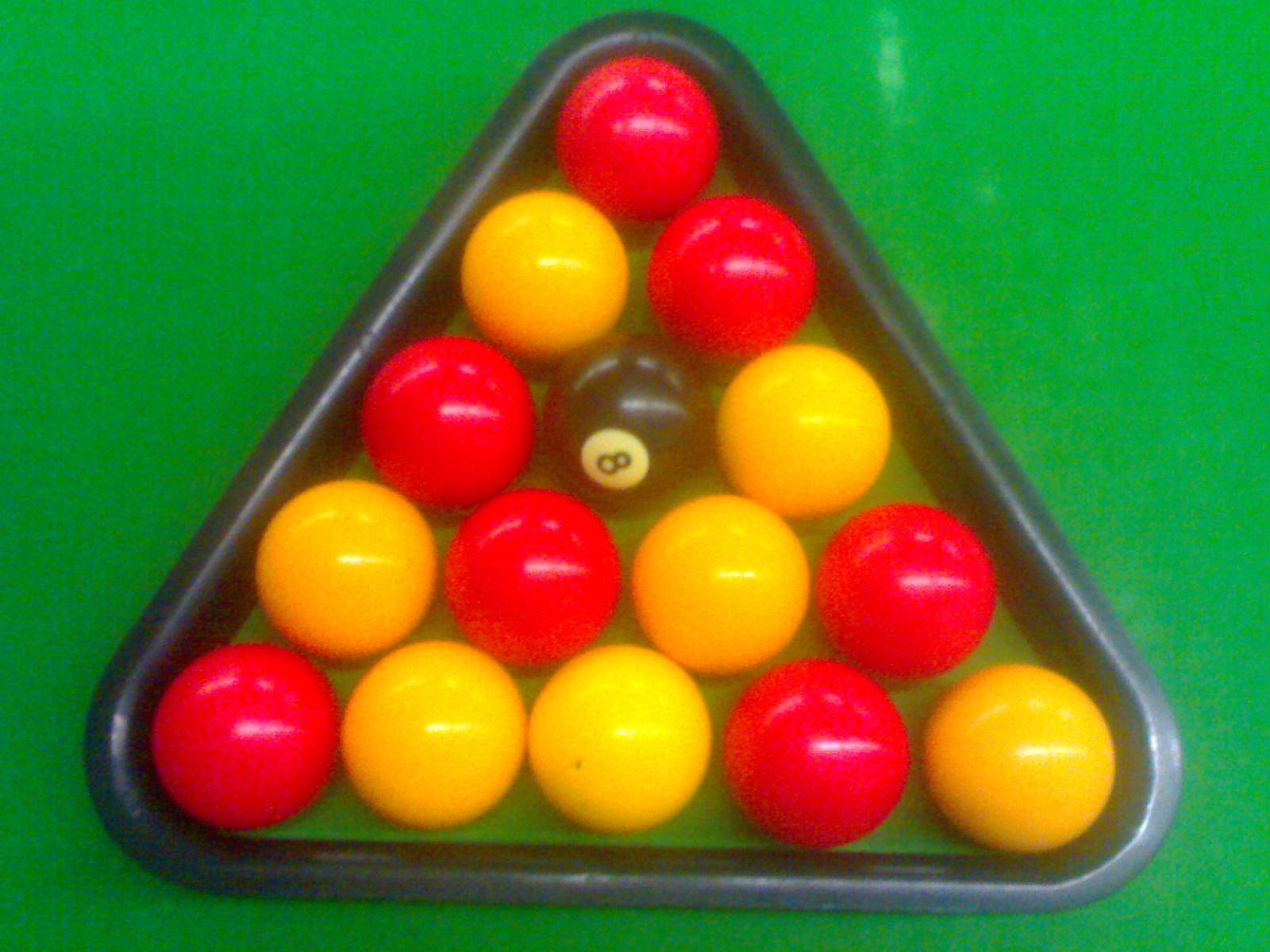
The rack set-up. Note the pattern of reds and yellows (colours can be reversed).

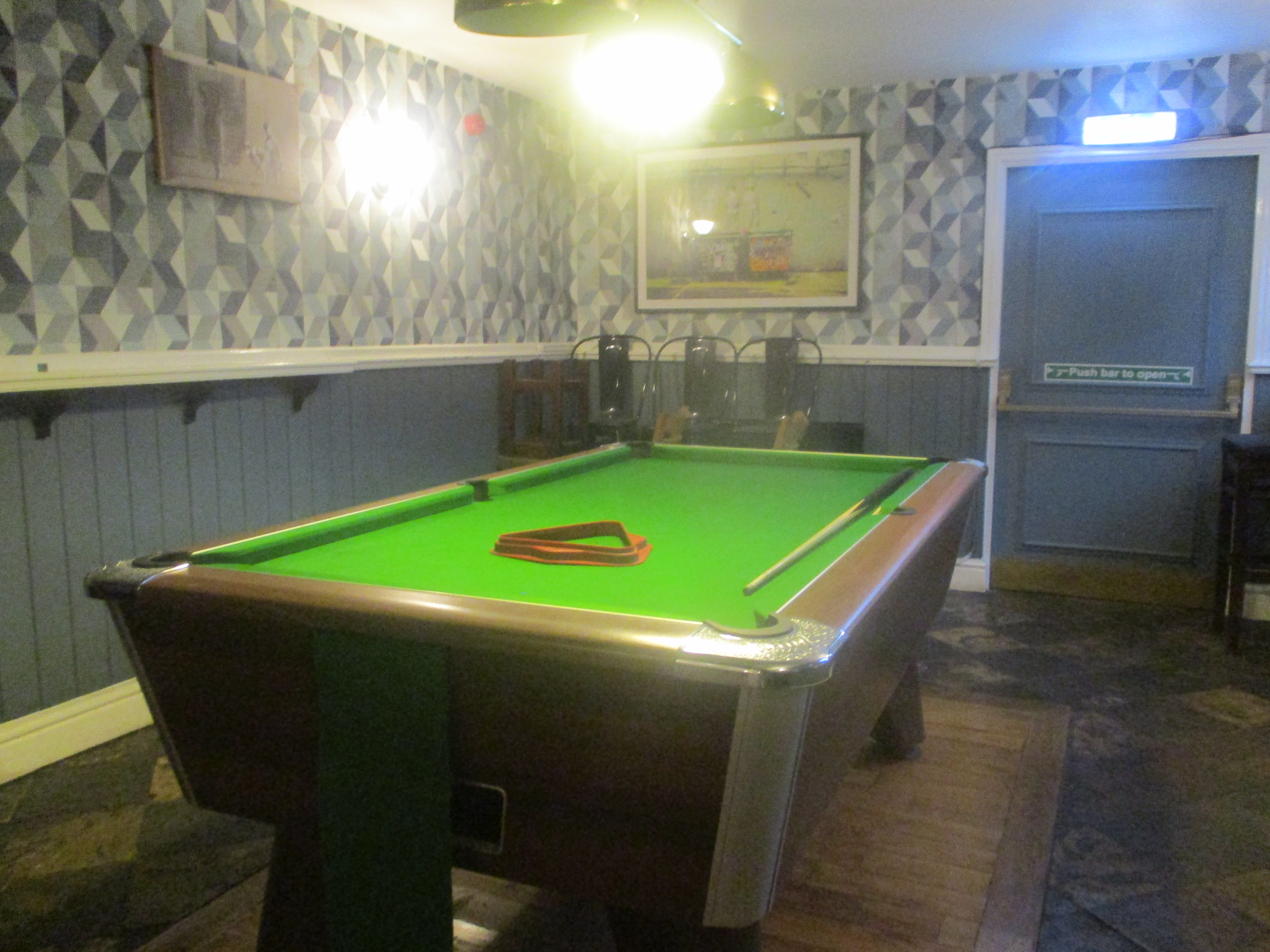
A pool table in a pub in Wetherby, West Yorkshire

The game uses unnumbered, solid-coloured object balls, typically red and yellow, with one black ball. The black ball typically bears a number "8", though numberless variants are not unknown. They are usually 2 inches (51 mm) or 2 1/16 inches (52 mm) in diameter – the latter being the same size as the balls used in snooker and English billiards – often with a slightly smaller cue ball, e.g. 1 7/8 inches (47.6 mm) for a 2-inch set, a convention originally created for the ball return mechanisms in coin-operated tables.

British pool tables come in 6 × 3 foot (1.8 × 0.9 m) or 7 × 3.5 ft (2.12 × 1.06 m) varieties, with 7 feet being the regulation size for league play. The table has pockets just larger than the balls and rounded, as in the game of snooker, whereas the international-style (or "American-style") table has pockets significantly wider, with pointed knuckles.

Tournament rules may require the presence of more than one type of rest (mechanical bridge), as in snooker.

== Rules ==
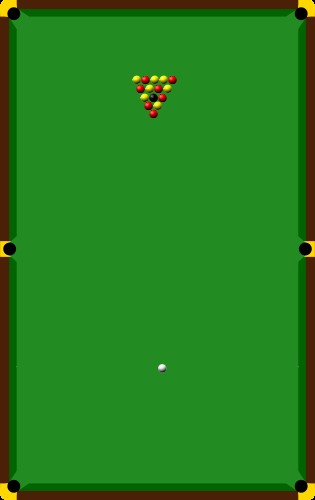
Pool table with balls placed in their starting positions

There are currently two distinct standardised rules used by governing bodies.

Since 2022, the International Eightball Pool Federation (IEPF), called the World Eightball Pool Federation (WEPF) prior to 2024, and its affiliates, including the English Pool Association (EPA), have adopted a ruleset known as "International Rules", which are also used in all events organised by the Ultimate Pool Group. Prior to 2022 these organisations used a different set of rules known as "World Rules".

The World Pool-Billiard Association (WPA) publishes their version of the rules under the name "blackball" to better distinguish it from the American-style game (for which the WPA also promulgates the world-standardised rules). Since 2013 these rules are used in all events organised by the International Professional Pool Association (IPA) and under the auspices of the English Blackball Pool Federation (EBPF).

=== Basic rules ===
Despite various differences between the competing rulesets, the basic objectives and rules of the game are mostly the same.

The balls are racked with the black (the 8 ball) on the foot spot (or "black spot"), in contrast with US-style eight-ball, nine-ball and most other pool games, in which the apex ball is placed on the foot spot.

One player begins the game with a "break shot", which involves shooting the cue ball from the baulk area towards the object balls and "splitting the pack".

The aim of the game is to pot all the balls of a certain colour (either reds or yellows), followed by the black eight-ball. The winner is usually the player who legally pots the black first, although it is possible to win the game by the opponent committing a sufficiently serious foul, such as potting the black eight-ball and the cue ball in the same shot.

A foul can be committed in numerous ways, such as potting the cue ball, potting the black eight-ball before the last colour in the set, hitting the wrong colour ball first or touching any ball with anything apart from the tip of the cue. After a foul, there is a penalty awarded to the other player. This penalty varies by ruleset, but could be winning the frame, gaining an extra shot or visit, being able to hit any ball on the table, or being able to move the cue ball to another location.

=== BAPTO/UKPF rules (1976–2004) ===
In 1976, the British Association of Pool Table Operators (BAPTO) published a standardised set of pool rules for use in their national events. With some minor changes, these rules were adopted by the newly formed UK Pool Federation (UKPF) in 1992 and known as "Federation rules". These rules were used until the UKPF adopted Blackball rules in 2004.

In these rules, for a fair break the player must pocket a ball or cause at least 2 balls to hit a cushion. Later versions of this rule were amended to state that at least 2 balls must pass the halfway line of the table if a ball is not potted. The breaker must nominate which colour they choose following the break shot. The standard penalty for a foul is 2 visits to the table for the incoming player, and a "free shot", whereby any ball can be played or potted on the first shot of the visit, with the exception of the black if it is not "on". The player awarded the penalty also has the option of moving the cue ball anywhere in the "D". Deliberate fouls result in loss of frame, and jump shots and push shots are illegal. There is no requirement to hit a cushion with each shot, meaning "rolling up" to a ball is a legal shot. Provided a player pots at least one of their own colours, it is legal to pot any number of their opponent's colour in the same shot.

=== EPA rules (1978–1998) ===
In 1978, the English Pool Association (EPA) published a standardised set of pool rules which they used in their county pool structure through the 1980s and 1990s. These rules were used until 1998, when the EPA adopted World rules in line with the WEPF.

In these rules, for a fair break the player must pocket a ball or cause at least 2 balls to hit a cushion. The first legally potted ball decides the colours. The standard penalty for a foul is 2 visits to the table for the incoming player, and a "free shot" on the first shot. The incoming player also has the option of moving the cue ball anywhere in the baulk area. Deliberate fouls result in loss of frame, and jump shots and push shots are illegal. There is no requirement to hit a cushion with each shot. Potting an opponent's ball is a foul except in the case of a "free shot".

Despite no longer being played at the professional level, these rules are still in use in some amateur leagues, and are referred to as "Old EPA rules" to distinguish them from later versions.

=== WEPF World Rules (1998–2022) ===
In 1998, the then-WEPF published a revised set of rules called "World Rules", which were also adopted by the EPA. These rules were used at all levels in EPA and WEPF tournaments until 2022, when both organisations adopted "International Rules".

In these rules, for a fair break the player must pocket a ball or cause at least 4 object balls to hit a cushion. If the breaker pots a ball on the break from one group, they must nominate a colour. If they nominate a colour which was potted on the break, then that group become theirs, while if the group chosen did not have any balls potted on the break, the table remains open until a ball is legally potted. The standard penalty for a foul is 2 visits to the table for the incoming player. There is no "free shot" rule. The cue ball cannot be moved, unless the incoming player has been left in a foul snooker, in which case they may nominate a free ball or move the cue ball to baulk. Unlike most other rulesets, deliberate fouls do not result in loss of frame, and are treated as a standard foul. Jump shots are illegal. Push shots are allowed provided no double contact or sustained push can be seen clearly by the referee. There is a requirement to either pot a ball or hit a cushion after first contact on each shot, meaning it is illegal to "roll up" to a ball. Potting an opponent's ball is a foul.

=== WPA blackball rules (2004–present) ===
In 2004, the World Pool-Billiard Association (WPA) sanctioned a variant of eight-ball pool called "blackball". The UKPF adopted these rules, and renamed themselves the European Blackball Association (EBA). These rules are now used at all levels in WPA tournaments and by the International Professional Pool Association (IPA).

In these rules, for a fair break the player must pocket a ball or cause at least 2 balls to cross the halfway point of the table. The first legally potted ball decides the colours. The standard penalty for a foul is 1 "free shot" for the incoming player, followed by one visit to the table. The incoming player also has the option of moving the cue ball anywhere in the baulk area following a foul. Deliberate fouls result in loss of frame, and jump shots and push shots are illegal. There is a requirement to either pot a ball or hit a cushion after first contact on each shot. Provided a player pots at least one of their own colours, it is legal to pot any number of their opponent's colour in the same shot.

=== International Rules (2022–present) ===
In 2022, the WEPF adopted "International Rules", originally called "Supreme Rules", which are now used at all levels in EPA and WEPF tournaments, and by the Ultimate Pool Group. In August 2024, the WEPF affiliated with the WPA, and rebranded as the International Eightball Pool Federation (IEPF).

In these rules, for a fair break the player must score 3 points, where a point is scored for each ball pocketed and for each ball which entirely passes the halfway point of the table. The first legally potted ball decides the colours. The standard penalty for a foul is 1 visit to the table for the incoming player. There is no "free shot" rule, but the cue ball can be moved anywhere on the table following a foul (ball-in-hand). Deliberate fouls result in loss of frame, and jump shots and push shots are illegal. There is a requirement to either pot a ball or hit a cushion after first contact on each shot. Provided a player makes first contact with one of their own colours, it is legal to pot any number of their opponent's colour in the same shot.

== World championships ==
World championships have been promoted by the various governing bodies over the years. The then-WEPF began sanctioning an annual world championship tournament in 1993. The Professional Pool Players Organisation began its own world championship in 1996, but it held its last edition in 2005 to make way for the WPA Blackball World Championships, which began in 2006 and are held biennially. The International Professional Pool Association has had held an annual world championship since 2014.
