= WPA Women's World Nine-ball Championship =

World pool championship, began 1990

The WPA Women's World Nine-ball Championship is an annual pool tournament in the discipline of nine-ball. The most successful player is Allison Fisher from England, who won the tournament in 1996, 1997, 1998 and 2001. The women's tournament usually takes place in a different place than the men's world championship.

== Results ==
Year	Location	Winner	Final score	Runner-up	Semifinalists
1990	(Germany) Bergheim	(United States) Robin Bell	3 : 0 (sets)	(United States) LoreeJon Ogonowski-Brown	(United States) Mary Kenniston
1990	(Germany) Bergheim	(United States) Robin Bell	3 : 0 (sets)	(United States) LoreeJon Ogonowski-Brown	(Sweden) Ewa Mataya
1991	(United States) Las Vegas	(United States) Robin Bell	9 : 5	(United States) JoAnn Mason	(United States) LoreeJon Ogonowski-Brown
1991	(United States) Las Vegas	(United States) Robin Bell	9 : 5	(United States) JoAnn Mason	(United States) Nikki Benish
1992	(Taiwan) Taipei	(Germany) Franziska Stark	11 : 10	(United States) Vivian Villarreal	(United States) Robin Bell
1992	(Taiwan) Taipei	(Germany) Franziska Stark	11 : 10	(United States) Vivian Villarreal	(United States) Peg Ledman
1993	(Germany) Königswinter	(United States) LoreeJon Ogonowski-Brown	2 : 1 (sets)	(United States) Jeanette Lee	(Sweden) Ewa Mataya
1993	(Germany) Königswinter	(United States) LoreeJon Ogonowski-Brown	2 : 1 (sets)	(United States) Jeanette Lee	(United States) Vivian Villarreal
1994	(United States) Chicago	(Sweden) Ewa Laurance	9 : 2	(United States) Jeanette Lee	(United States) LoreeJon Ogonowski-Brown
1994	(United States) Chicago	(Sweden) Ewa Laurance	9 : 2	(United States) Jeanette Lee	(United States) Vivian Villarreal
1995	(Taiwan) Taipei	(Austria) Gerda Hofstätter	9 : 8	(United States) Vivian Villarreal	(England) Allison Fisher
1995	(Taiwan) Taipei	(Austria) Gerda Hofstätter	9 : 8	(United States) Vivian Villarreal	(United States) Nikki Benish
1996	(Sweden) Borlänge	(England) Allison Fisher	13 : 4	(Sweden) Helena Thörnfeldt	(Chinese Taipei) Liu Shin-mei
1996	(Sweden) Borlänge	(England) Allison Fisher	13 : 4	(Sweden) Helena Thörnfeldt	(Germany) Ulrike Gerhald
1997	(United States) Chicago	(England) Allison Fisher	9 : 2	(Chinese Taipei) Chen Chun-chen	(Sweden) Helena Thörnfeldt
1997	(United States) Chicago	(England) Allison Fisher	9 : 2	(Chinese Taipei) Chen Chun-chen	(Japan) Akimi Kajitani
1998	(Taiwan) Taipei	(England) Allison Fisher	11 : 3	(Germany) Franziska Stark	(Sweden) Ewa Laurance
1998	(Taiwan) Taipei	(England) Allison Fisher	11 : 3	(Germany) Franziska Stark	(United States) Jeanette Lee
1999	(Spain) Alicante	(Chinese Taipei) Liu Shin-mei	11 : 10	(England) Allison Fisher	(Sweden) Ulrika Andersson
1999	(Spain) Alicante	(Chinese Taipei) Liu Shin-mei	11 : 10	(England) Allison Fisher	(Northern Ireland) Karen Corr
2000	(Canada) Quebec City	(Republic of Ireland) Julie Kelly	9 : 8	(Northern Ireland) Karen Corr	(Japan) Kyoko Sone
2000	(Canada) Quebec City	(Republic of Ireland) Julie Kelly	9 : 8	(Northern Ireland) Karen Corr	(England) Allison Fisher
2001	(Japan) Amagasaki	(England) Allison Fisher	11 : 8	(Northern Ireland) Karen Corr	(Chinese Taipei) Liu Shin-mei
2001	(Japan) Amagasaki	(England) Allison Fisher	11 : 8	(Northern Ireland) Karen Corr	(Japan) Akimi Kajitani
2002	(Taiwan) Kaohsiung	(Chinese Taipei) Liu Shin-mei	11 : 10	(Northern Ireland) Karen Corr	(Chinese Taipei) Kao Shi-Pin
2002	(Taiwan) Kaohsiung	(Chinese Taipei) Liu Shin-mei	11 : 10	(Northern Ireland) Karen Corr	(Austria) Gerda Hofstätter
2003	not held				
2004	(Austria) Rankweil	(South Korea) Kim Ga-young	11 : 9	(Chinese Taipei) Liu Shin-mei	(China) Pan Xiaoting
2004	(Austria) Rankweil	(South Korea) Kim Ga-young	11 : 9	(Chinese Taipei) Liu Shin-mei	(Northern Ireland) Karen Corr
2005	not held				
2006	(Taiwan) Taipei	(South Korea) Kim Ga-young	11 : 8	(Chinese Taipei) Liu Shin-mei	(Japan) Akimi Kajitani
2006	(Taiwan) Taipei	(South Korea) Kim Ga-young	11 : 8	(Chinese Taipei) Liu Shin-mei	(Austria) Jasmin Ouschan
2007	(Taiwan) Taoyuan	(China) Pan Xiaoting	11 : 5	(Philippines) Rubilen Amit	(Chinese Taipei) Tsai Pei-Chen
2007	(Taiwan) Taoyuan	(China) Pan Xiaoting	11 : 5	(Philippines) Rubilen Amit	(Japan) Yukiko Hamanishi
2008	(Taiwan) Taipei	(Chinese Taipei) Lin Yuan-chun	11 : 7	(South Korea) Kim Ga-young	(England) Allison Fisher
2008	(Taiwan) Taipei	(Chinese Taipei) Lin Yuan-chun	11 : 7	(South Korea) Kim Ga-young	(Austria) Jasmin Ouschan
2009	(China) Shenyang	(China) Liu Shasha	9 : 5	(Northern Ireland) Karen Corr	(China) Pan Xiaoting
2009	(China) Shenyang	(China) Liu Shasha	9 : 5	(Northern Ireland) Karen Corr	(China) Fu Xiaofang
2010	(China) Shenyang	(China) Fu Xiaofang	9 : 7	(England) Allison Fisher	(China) Liu Shasha
2010	(China) Shenyang	(China) Fu Xiaofang	9 : 7	(England) Allison Fisher	(Chinese Taipei) Shu-Han Chung
2011	(China) Shenyang	(China) Bi Zhuqing	9 : 7	(China) Chen Siming	(China) Fu Xiaofang
2011	(China) Shenyang	(China) Bi Zhuqing	9 : 7	(China) Chen Siming	(China) Yu Han
2012	(China) Shenyang	(England) Kelly Fisher	9 : 6	(China) Fu Xiaofang	(China) Liu Shasha
2012	(China) Shenyang	(England) Kelly Fisher	9 : 6	(China) Fu Xiaofang	(Chinese Taipei) Tsai Pei-chen
2013	(China) Shenyang	(China) Yu Han	9 : 1	(Chinese Taipei) Lin Yuan-chun	(China) Liu Shasha
2013	(China) Shenyang	(China) Yu Han	9 : 1	(Chinese Taipei) Lin Yuan-chun	(Chinese Taipei) Tan Ho-yun
2014	(China) Guilin	(China) Liu Shasha	9 : 8	(China) Chen Siming	(South Korea) Kim Ga-young
2014	(China) Guilin	(China) Liu Shasha	9 : 8	(China) Chen Siming	(Chinese Taipei) Tan Ho-yun
2015	(China) Guilin	(China) Liu Shasha	9 : 4	(Austria) Jasmin Ouschan	(Chinese Taipei) Chou Chieh-yu
2015	(China) Guilin	(China) Liu Shasha	9 : 4	(Austria) Jasmin Ouschan	(Japan) Chihiro Kawahara
2016	(China) Emeishan	(China) Yu Han	9 : 7	(Japan) Chihiro Kawahara	(China) Ge Bai
2016	(China) Emeishan	(China) Yu Han	9 : 7	(Japan) Chihiro Kawahara	(China) Gao Meng
2017	(China) Haikou	(China) Chen Siming	9 : 7	(China) Pan Xiaoting	(Chinese Taipei) Chou Chieh-yu
2017	(China) Haikou	(China) Chen Siming	9 : 7	(China) Pan Xiaoting	(China) Yu Han
2018	(China) Sanya	(China) Yu Han	9 : 6	(China) Wang Xiaotong	(Philippines) Rubilen Amit
2018	(China) Sanya	(China) Yu Han	9 : 6	(China) Wang Xiaotong	(China) Fu Xiaofang
2019	(China) Sanya	(England) Kelly Fisher	9 : 7	(Austria) Jasmin Ouschan	(China) Zhou Doudou
2019	(China) Sanya	(England) Kelly Fisher	9 : 7	(Austria) Jasmin Ouschan	(Philippines) Rubilen Amit
2020-22	not held				
2023	(United States) Atlantic City	(Chinese Taipei) Chou Chieh-yu	9 : 0	(England) Allison Fisher	(South Korea) Seo Seoa
2023	(United States) Atlantic City	(Chinese Taipei) Chou Chieh-yu	9 : 0	(England) Allison Fisher	(Russia) Kristina Tkach
2024	(New Zealand) Hamilton	(Philippines) Rubilen Amit	3 : 1 (sets)	(China) Chen Siming	(Japan) Kawahara Chihiro
2024	(New Zealand) Hamilton	(Philippines) Rubilen Amit	3 : 1 (sets)	(China) Chen Siming	(Russia) Kristina Tkach
2025	(United States) Jacksonville	(South Korea) Seo Seoa	3 : 2 (sets)	(Russia) Kristina Tkach	(United States) Allison Fisher
2025	(United States) Jacksonville	(South Korea) Seo Seoa	3 : 2 (sets)	(Russia) Kristina Tkach	(China) Fu Xiaofang
2026	(Indonesia) Nusa Dua	(Chinese Taipei) Chou Chieh-yu	3 : 1 (sets)	(South Korea) Seo Seoa	(Chinese Taipei) Wei Tzu-chien
2026	(Indonesia) Nusa Dua	(Chinese Taipei) Chou Chieh-yu	3 : 1 (sets)	(South Korea) Seo Seoa	(Japan) Chihiro Kawahara

== Winners ==
Place	Player	Championships	Runner-ups
1	(England) Allison Fisher	4	3
2	(China) Liu Shasha	3	0
2	(China) Han Yu	3	0
4	(Chinese Taipei) Liu Shin-mei	2	2
5	(South Korea) Kim Ga-young	2	1
6	(United States) Robin Dodson	2	0
6	(England) Kelly Fisher	2	0
6	(Chinese Taipei) Chou Chieh-yu	2	0
9	(China) Chen Siming	1	2
10	(Germany) Franziska Stark	1	1
10	(United States) LoreeJon Ogonowski-Brown	1	1
10	(China) Pan Xiaoting	1	1
10	(Chinese Taipei) Lin Yuan-chun	1	1
10	(China) Fu Xiaofang	1	1
10	(Philippines) Rubilen Amit	1	1
10	(South Korea) Seo Seoa	1	1
16	(Sweden) Ewa Laurance	1	0
16	(Austria) Gerda Hofstätter	1	0
16	(Republic of Ireland) Julie Kelly	1	0
16	(China) Bi Zhuqing	1	0
16	(South Korea) Seo Seoa	1	0
