= List of WPA World Nine-ball champions =

The World Nine-ball Championships are held annually, and are sanctioned by the World Pool-Billiard Association. Events have been held for boys and women, and for the main world championships since this time, with a girl's tournament being created in 2004. In 2013, the men's championship was changed from being inclusive for all (Note: Under 18s and Women were previously allowed to enter the competition) to a men's only event. From 2021, the main tournament became all inclusive once again, while the women's event was discontinued. In 1999, two men's tournaments were held, with one being run by the World Pool Association, held in Spain, and the other not recognised, held in Wales and known as the 1999 World Pool Championship. However, both events were later recognised as official world championships for the year of 1999.

== Men's champions ==
List of WPA World Nine-ball Men's Championship winners
| Year | Winner | Runner-up | Final score | Location |
|---|---|---|---|---|
| 1990 | Earl Strickland (USA) | Jeff Carter (USA) | 3–1 (Note: The title was decided over a series of sets rather than racks.) | Bergheim, Germany |
| 1991 | Earl Strickland (USA) | Nick Varner (USA) | 9–7 | Las Vegas, United States |
| 1992 | Johnny Archer (USA) | Bobby Hunter (USA) | 13–12 | Taipei, Taiwan |
| 1993 | Chao Fong-pang (TPE) | Thomas Hasch (GER) | 2–0 | Königswinter, Germany |
| 1994 | Takeshi Okumura (JPN) | Yasunari Itsuzaki (JPN) | 9–6 | Chicago, United States |
| 1995 | Oliver Ortmann (GER) | Dallas West (USA) | 11–9 | Taipei, Taiwan |
| 1996 | Ralf Souquet (GER) | Tom Storm (SWE) | 11–1 | Borlänge, Sweden |
| 1997 | Johnny Archer (USA) | Lee Kun-fang (TPE) | 9–3 | Chicago, United States |
| 1998 | Kunihiko Takahashi (JPN) | Johnny Archer (USA) | 13–3 | Taipei, Taiwan |
| 1999 | Efren Reyes (PHI) | Chang Hao-ping (TPE) | 17–8 | Cardiff, Wales |
| 1999 | Nick Varner (USA) | Jeremy Jones (USA) | 13–8 | Alicante, Spain |
| 2000 | Chao Fong-pang (TPE) | Ismael Páez (MEX) | 17–6 | Cardiff, Wales |
| 2001 | Mika Immonen (FIN) | Ralf Souquet (GER) | 17–10 | Cardiff, Wales |
| 2002 | Earl Strickland (USA) | Francisco Bustamante (PHI) | 17–15 | Cardiff, Wales |
| 2003 | Thorsten Hohmann (GER) | Alex Pagulayan (CAN) | 17–10 | Cardiff, Wales |
| 2004 | Alex Pagulayan (CAN) | Chang Pei-wei (TPE) | 17–13 | Taipei, Taiwan |
| 2005 | Wu Jia-qing (TPE) | Kuo Po-cheng (TPE) | 17–16 | Kaohsiung, Taiwan |
| 2006 | Ronato Alcano (PHI) | Ralf Souquet (GER) | 17–11 | Pasay, Philippines |
| 2007 | Daryl Peach (GBR) | Roberto Gomez (PHI) | 17–15 | Quezon City, Philippines |
2008–2009: No tournament (Note: Due to the 2008 financial crisis)
| 2010 | Francisco Bustamante (PHI) | Kuo Po-cheng (TPE) | 13–7 | Doha, Qatar |
| 2011 | Yukio Akakariyama (JPN) | Ronato Alcano (PHI) | 13–11 | Doha, Qatar |
| 2012 | Darren Appleton (GBR) | Li Hewen (CHN) | 13–12 | Doha, Qatar |
| 2013 | Thorsten Hohmann (GER) | Antonio Gabica (PHI) | 13–7 | Doha, Qatar |
| 2014 | Niels Feijen (NED) | Albin Ouschan (AUT) | 13–10 | Doha, Qatar |
| 2015 | Ko Pin-yi (TPE) | Shane Van Boening (USA) | 13–11 | Doha, Qatar |
| 2016 | Albin Ouschan (AUT) | Shane Van Boening (USA) | 13–6 | Doha, Qatar |
| 2017 | Carlo Biado (PHI) | Roland Garcia (PHI) | 13–5 | Doha, Qatar |
| 2018 | Joshua Filler (GER) | Carlo Biado (PHI) | 13–10 | Doha, Qatar |
| 2019 | Fedor Gorst (RUS) | Chang Jung-lin (TPE) | 13–11 | Doha, Qatar |
2020: No tournament (Note: Due to the COVID-19 pandemic)
| 2021 | Albin Ouschan (AUT) | Omar Al-Shaheen (KWT) | 13–9 | Milton Keynes, England |
| 2022 | Shane Van Boening (USA) | Albin Ouschan (AUT) | 13–6 | Milton Keynes, England |
| 2023 | Francisco Sánchez Ruiz (ESP) | Mohammad Soufi (SYR) | 13–10 | Kielce, Poland |
| 2024 | Fedor Gorst (USA) | Eklent Kaçi (ALB) | 15–14 | Jeddah, Saudi Arabia |
| 2025 | Carlo Biado (PHI) | Fedor Gorst (USA) | 15–13 | Jeddah, Saudi Arabia |

== Women's champions ==
| Year | Winner | Runner-up | Location |
|---|---|---|---|
| 1990 | (United States) Robin Bell | (United States) LoreeJon Ogonowski-Brown | Bergheim, Germany |
| 1991 | (United States) Robin Bell (2) | (United States) JoAnn Mason | Las Vegas, United States |
| 1992 | (Germany) Franziska Stark | (United States) Vivian Villarreal | Taipei, Taiwan |
| 1993 | (United States) LoreeJon Ogonowski-Brown | (United States) Jeanette Lee | Königswinter, Germany |
| 1994 | (Sweden) Ewa Laurance | (United States) Jeanette Lee | Chicago, United States |
| 1995 | (Austria) Gerda Hofstatter | (United States) Vivian Villarreal | Taipei, Taiwan |
| 1996 | (England) Allison Fisher | (United States) Jeanette Lee | Borlänge, Sweden |
| 1997 | (England) Allison Fisher (2) | (Chinese Taipei) Jennifer Chen | Chicago, United States |
| 1998 | (England) Allison Fisher (3) | (Germany) Franziska Stark | Taipei, Taiwan |
| 1999 | (Chinese Taipei) Liu Shin-mei | (England) Allison Fisher | Alicante, Spain |
| 2000 | (Republic of Ireland) Julie Kelly | (Northern Ireland) Karen Corr | Quebec City, Canada |
| 2001 | (England) Allison Fisher (4) | (Northern Ireland) Karen Corr | Amagasaki, Japan |
| 2002 | (Chinese Taipei) Liu Shin-mei (2) | (Northern Ireland) Karen Corr | Kaohsiung, Taiwan |
| 2004 | (South Korea) Kim Ga-young | (Chinese Taipei) Liu Shin-mei | Rankweil, Austria |
| 2006 | (South Korea) Kim Ga-young (2) | (Chinese Taipei) Liu Shin-mei | Taipei, Taiwan |
| 2007 | (China) Pan Xiaoting | (Philippines) Rubilen Amit | Taoyuan, Taiwan |
| 2008 | (Chinese Taipei) Lin Yuan-chun | (South Korea) Kim Ga-young | Taipei, Taiwan |
| 2009 | (China) Liu Shasha | (Northern Ireland) Karen Corr | Shenyang, China |
| 2010 | (China) Fu Xiaofang | (England) Allison Fisher | Shenyang, China |
| 2011 | (China) Bi Zhu Qing | (China) Chen Siming | Shenyang, China |
| 2012 | (England) Kelly Fisher | (China) Fu Xiaofang | Shenyang, China |
| 2013 | (China) Han Yu | (Chinese Taipei) Lin Yuan-chun | Shenyang, China |
| 2014 | (China) Liu Shasha (2) | (China) Chen Siming | Guilin, China |
| 2015 | (China) Liu Shasha (3) | (Austria) Jasmin Ouschan | Guilin, China |
| 2016 | (China) Han Yu (2) | (Japan) Chihiro Kawahara | Emeishan City, China |
| 2017 | (China) Chen Siming | (China) Pan Xiaoting | Chengmai County, China |
| 2018 | (China) Han Yu (3) | (China) Wang Xiaotong | Sanya, China |
| 2019 | (England) Kelly Fisher (2) | (Austria) Jasmin Ouschan | Sanya, China |
| 2023 | (Chinese Taipei) Chou Chieh-yu | (England) Allison Fisher | New Jersey, United States |
| 2024 | (Philippines) Rubilen Amit | (China) Chen Siming | Hamilton, New Zealand |
| 2025 | (South Korea) Seo Seoa | (Russia) Kristina Tkach | Jacksonville, United States |
| 2026 | (Chinese Taipei) Chou Chieh-yu (2) | (South Korea) Seo Seoa | Nusa Dua, Indonesia |

== Junior champions ==
The first Junior Championships played since 1992 for boys, and a girls' division played since 2004.

=== Under-19 ===
==== Boys ====
| Year | Dates | Location | Winner | Runner-up |
|---|---|---|---|---|
| 1992 | April 1–5 | Taipei, Taiwan | (Chinese Taipei) Hsia Hui-kai | (United States) Michael Coltrain |
| 1993 | December 7–12 | Königswinter, Germany | (Chinese Taipei) Hsia Hui-kai (2) | (Chinese Taipei) Hsieh-Chun wang |
| 1994 | November 2–6 | Chicago, United States | (Norway) Jørn Kjølaas | (Austria) Andreas Rindler |
| 1995 | November 15–19 | Taipei, Taiwan | (Chinese Taipei) Huang Kung-chang | (Germany) Alexander Dremsizis |
| 1996 | October 23–27 | Borlänge, Sweden | (Chinese Taipei) Huang Kung-chang (2) | (Austria) Andreas Rindler |
| 1997 | October 1–5 | Chicago, United States | (Germany) Christian Goteman | (Chinese Taipei) Chi Hsiang-chuang |
| 1998 | November 11–15 | Taipei, Taiwan | (Chinese Taipei) Lu Hui-chan | (Thailand) Atthasit Mahitthi |
| 1999 | December 5–12 | Alicante, Spain | (Chinese Taipei) Lu Hui-chan (2) | (Greece) John Vassalos |
| 2000 | November 14–19 | Quebec City, Canada | (Switzerland) Dimitri Jungo | (Germany) Brian Naithani |
| 2001 | November 17–19 | Amagasaki, Japan | (Germany) Brian Naithani | (Chinese Taipei) Chang Jung-lin |
| 2002 | July 3–7 | Kaohsiung, Taiwan | (Chinese Taipei) Chen Ying-chieh | (United States) Shane Hennen |
| 2003 | November 18–23 | Willingen, Germany | (Hungary) Vilmos Földes | (Chinese Taipei) Chang Jung-lin |
| 2004 | November 1–5 | Adelaide, Australia | (Chinese Taipei) Wu Yu-lun | (Chinese Taipei) Wu Jia-qing |
| 2005 | September 20–25 | Velden, Austria | (Chinese Taipei) Wu Yu-lun (2) | (Japan) Hayato Hijikata |
| 2006 | November 13–17 | Sydney, Australia | (Chinese Taipei) Wu Yu-lun (3) | (Chinese Taipei) Ko Pin-yi |
| 2007 | December 12–15 | Willingen, Germany | (Chinese Taipei) Ko Pin-yi | (Chinese Taipei) Wu Yu-lun |
| 2008 | December 1–3 | Reno, United States | (Chinese Taipei) Ko Pin-yi (2) | (Philippines) Jerico Banares |
| 2009 | November 16–22 | Shenyang, China | (Russia) Ruslan Chinakhov | (England) Phil Burford |
| 2010 | Nov. 29 – Dec 1 | Reno, United States | (Spain) Francisco Sánchez Ruiz | (United States) Jesse Engel |
| 2011 | September 1–3 | Kielce, Poland | (Poland) Marek Kudlik | (Poland) Konrad Piekarski |
| 2012 | December 5–7 | Willingen, Germany | (Chinese Taipei) Liu Cheng-chieh | (Germany) Tobias Bongers |
| 2013 | December 9–12 | Johannesburg, South Africa | (Chinese Taipei) Ko Ping-chung | (Poland) Sebastian Batkowski |
| 2014 | November 15–18 | Shanghai, China | (Singapore) Aloysius Yapp | (Chinese Taipei) Hsu Jui-an |
| 2015 | November 14–17 | Shanghai, China | (China) Long Zehuang | (Russia) Maksim Dudanets |
| 2016 | November 17–20 | Shanghai, China | (China) Kong Dejing | (Poland) Daniel Macioł |
| 2017 | Oct. 30 – Nov 2 | Moscow, Russia | (Russia) Fedor Gorst | (Mongolia) Enkhbold Temuujin |
| 2018 | Oct. 31 – Nov 3 | Moscow, Russia | (Hong Kong) Yip Kin-ling | (Hong Kong) Robbie Capito |
| 2019 | November 21–23 | Nicosia, Cyprus | (Spain) Jonás Souto | (Bosnia and Herzegovina) Sanjin Pehlivanovic |
| 2021 | October 4–10 | Klagenfurt, Austria | (Germany) Moritz Neuhausen | (Poland) Szymon Kural |
| 2022 | October 19–21 | San Juan, Puerto Rico | (Poland) Szymon Kural | (Germany) Yuma Dörner |
| 2023 | October 19–22 | Klagenfurt, Austria | (Netherlands) Yannick Pongers | (Netherlands) Mika van Berkel |
| 2024 | September 5–8 | Hamilton, New Zealand | (Netherlands) Mika van Berkel | (United States) Adrian Prasad |
| 2025 | July 21–26 | Jeddah, Saudi Arabia | (Indonesia) Albert Januarta | (Germany) Pius Baier |

==== Girls ====
| Year | Dates | Location | Winner | Runner-up |
|---|---|---|---|---|
| 2004 | November 1–5 | Adelaide, Australia | (China) Zhou Meng-meng | (Chinese Taipei) Wu Ching |
| 2005 | September 20–25 | Velden, Austria | (Austria) Jasmin Ouschan | (Greece) Helen Athanasiou |
| 2006 | November 13–17 | Sydney, Australia | (United States) Mary Rakin | (United States) Anna Kostanian |
| 2007 | December 3–7 | Willingen, Germany | (United States) Mary Rakin (2) | (Germany) Tina Bühnen |
| 2008 | December 1–3 | Reno, United States | (Canada) Brittany Bryant | (Japan) Konischi Samia |
| 2009 | November 4–7 | Managua, Nicaragua | (Chinese Taipei) Keng Chun-lin | (Germany) Anja Wagner |
| 2010 | Nov. 29 – Dec 1 | Reno, United States | (Canada) Brittany Bryant (2) | (United States) Briana Miller |
| 2011 | Aug. 31 – Sep 4 | Kielce, Poland | (Poland) Oliwia Zalewska | (Russia) Anastasia Nechaeva |
| 2012 | December 4–7 | Willingen, Germany | (Belgium) Kamila Khodjaeva | (Poland) Oliwia Zalewska |
| 2013 | December 9–12 | Johannesburg, South Africa | (Russia) Natasha Seroshtan | (Japan) Yuki Hiraguchi |
| 2014 | November 15–18 | Shanghai, China | (China) Liu Yu Chen | (Belgium) Kamila Khodjaeva |
| 2015 | November 14–17 | Shanghai, China | (Philippines) Chezka Centeno | (China) Xia Yu Ying |
| 2016 | November 17–20 | Shanghai, China | (Chinese Taipei) Chen Chia-hua | (Chinese Taipei) Tsai Pei-chun |
| 2017 | Oct. 30 – Nov 2 | Moscow, Russia | (Russia) Kristina Tkach | (South Korea) Lee Woo-jin |
| 2018 | Oct. 31 – Nov 3 | Moscow, Russia | (Chinese Taipei) Chen Chia-hua (2) | (South Korea) Seo Seoa |
| 2019 | November 21–23 | Nicosia, Cyprus | (Chinese Taipei) Lu Yi-hsuan | (Japan) Tamami Okuda |
| 2021 | October 4–10 | Klagenfurt, Austria | (Austria) Lena Primus | (South Korea) Kim Hye-rim |
| 2022 | October 19–21 | San Juan, Puerto Rico | (Chinese Taipei) Xin Yu-Hong | (South Korea) Kim Hye-rim |
| 2023 | October 19–22 | Klagenfurt, Austria | (Chinese Taipei) Xin Yu-Hong (2) | (United States) Sofia Mast |
| 2024 | September 5–8 | Hamilton, New Zealand | (United States) Sofia Mast | (United States) Savannah Easton |

=== Under-17 ===
==== Boys ====
| Year | Dates | Location | Winner | Runner-up |
|---|---|---|---|---|
| 2014 | November 15–18 | Shanghai, China | (China) De Jing Kong | (Philippines) Jeffrey Roda |
| 2015 | November 14–17 | Shanghai, China | (Poland) Daniel Macioł | (China) Zheng Xiaohuai |
| 2016 | November 17–20 | Shanghai, China | (China) Zheng Xiaohuai | (Mongolia) Temuujin Enkhbold |
| 2017 | Oct. 30 – Nov 2 | Moscow, Russia | (Bosnia and Herzegovina) Sanjin Pehlivanovic | (Hong Kong) Robbie Capito |
| 2018 | Oct. 31 – Nov 3 | Moscow, Russia | (United States) Mahkeal Parris | (Norway) Emil Andre Gangflot |
| 2019 | November 21–23 | Nicosia, Cyprus | (Germany) Moritz Neuhausen | (Hong Kong) Fu Huan |
| 2021 | October 4–10 | Klagenfurt, Austria | (Poland) Dominik Jastrząb | (Netherlands) Yannick Pongers |
| 2022 | October 19–21 | San Juan, Puerto Rico | (Estonia) Karl Gnadeberg | (Hong Kong) Lang Yi Li |
| 2023 | October 19–22 | Klagenfurt, Austria | (Indonesia) Derin Asaku Sitorus | (United States) Adrian Prasad |
| 2024 | September 5–8 | Hamilton, New Zealand | (Estonia) Revo Maimre | (Sweden) Walter Laikre |

== Wheelchair champions ==
| Year | Winner |
|---|---|
| 1999 | (United States) Bob Calderon |
| 2000 | (Republic of Ireland) Fred Dinsmore |
| 2002 | (Finland) Jouni Tähti |
| 2003 | (Sweden) Henrik Larsson |
| 2004 | (Chinese Taipei) Chu Shou-Wei |
| 2005 | (Germany) Emil Schranz |
| 2007 | (Sweden) Henrik Larsson (2) |
| 2008 | (United States) Aaron Aragon |
| 2009 | (Finland) Jouni Tähti (2) |
| 2010 | (Finland) Jouni Tähti (3) |
| 2011 | (Finland) Jouni Tähti (4) |
| 2012 | (Sweden) Henrik Larsson (3) |
| 2013 | (Finland) Jouni Tähti (5) |
| 2014 | (Sweden) Henrik Larsson (4) |
| 2016 | (Sweden) Henrik Larsson (5) |
| 2017 | (Republic of Ireland) Fred Dinsmore (2) |
