= 2017 WPA Women's World Nine-ball Championship =

2017 professional nine-ball pool tournament

Tournament information
- Dates: November 8–11 2017
- City: Chengmai
- Country: China
- Organisation: World Pool Association
- Format: Double elimination / Single elimination
- Discipline: Nine-ball
- Total prize fund: $175,000
- Winner's share: $43,000
- Participants: 64

Final
- Champion: Chen Siming (CHN)
- Runner-up: Pan Xiaoting (CHN)
- Score: 9–7

The 2017 Women's World Nine-ball Championship was a professional nine-ball pool tournament which was held in Hainan Chengmai (China) from 8 to 11 November 2017. The event was organized by the Guoao Group, which has hosted this event from 2013.

Overall 64 players from all around the world was divided into 8 groups of 8 players, where double elimination format was applied. In the group stage all matches were race to 7 with alternate break format. Overall 32 players proceeded to the main tournament - knockout stage. In the knockout stage all matches were played race to 9.

Chen Siming won the title with the 9–7 victory over Pan Xiaoting in the final. It was Chen's first Women's World Nine-ball title.

== Prize money ==
The prize money for the event is shown below.

Prize money
Position	Prize
First place (Champion)	$43,000
Second place (Runner-up)	$21,000
3rd - 4th	$11,000
5th - 8th	$6,000
9th - 16th	$3,000
17th - 32nd	$1,500
33rd - 48th	$800
Total	$175,000

== Preliminary round - Double elimination ==
In the group stage, the double elimination format was played with race to 7.

=== Group A ===
Main Round
(China) Chen Siming	7
(Germany) Veronika Ivanovskaia	4
(South Korea) Hye Ju Jin	7
(Poland) Katarzyna Weselowska	6
(Thailand) Adriana Villar	7
(China) Ruolin Chen	5
(Singapore) Shu Wah Hoe	7
(China) Zhou Doudou	2
1st playoff round
(Germany) Veronika Ivanovskaia	6
(Poland) Katarzyna Weselowska	7
(China) Ruolin Chen	2
(China) Zhou Doudou	7

Winner's Round
(China) Chen Siming	7
(South Korea) Hye Ju Jin	2
(Thailand) Adriana Villar	5
(Singapore) Shu Wah Hoe	7
2nd playoff round
(Poland) Katarzyna Weselowska	2
(Thailand) Adriana Villar	7
(China) Zhou Doudou	7
(South Korea) Hye Ju Jin	2

=== Group B ===
Main Round
(China) Han Yu	4
(South Korea) Yun Mi Lim	7
(Chinese Taipei) Szu-Ting Kuo	7
(Peru) Jackeline Perez	4
(Chinese Taipei) Yuan-Chun Lin	6
(Japan) Kyoko Sone	7
(Russia) Kristina Tkach	5
(Philippines) Rubilen Amit	7
1st playoff round
(South Korea) Yun Mi Lim	7
(Peru) Jackeline Perez	3
(Chinese Taipei) Yuan-Chun Lin	7
(Russia) Kristina Tkach	4

Winner's Round
(South Korea) Yun Mi Lim	1
(Chinese Taipei) Szu-Ting Kuo	7
(Japan) Kyoko Sone	2
(Philippines) Rubilen Amit	7
2nd playoff round
(China) Han Yu	7
(Japan) Kyoko Sone	5
(Chinese Taipei) Yuan-Chun Lin	4
(South Korea) Yun Mi Lim	7

=== Group C ===
Main Round
(China) Liu Shasha	7
(Turkey) Eylül Kibaroğlu	2
(Chinese Taipei) Zhi-Ting Wu	7
(Lebanon) Joel Tohme	1
(China) Xiaotong Wang	6
(South Korea) Eunji Park	7
(Poland) Oliwia Czuprynska	3
(China) Teng Jiang	7
1st playoff round
(Turkey) Eylül Kibaroğlu	7
(Lebanon) Joel Tohme	0
(China) Xiaotong Wang	7
(Poland) Oliwia Czuprynska	6

Winner's Round
(China) Liu Shasha	7
(Chinese Taipei) Zhi-Ting Wu	4
(South Korea) Eunji Park	7
(China) Teng Jiang	1
2nd playoff round
(Turkey) Eylül Kibaroğlu	5
(China) Teng Jiang	7
(China) Xiaotong Wang	7
(Chinese Taipei) Zhi-Ting Wu	5

=== Group D ===
Main Round
(South Korea) Kim Ga-young	2
(China) Xiaotong Zhang	7
(Singapore) Jessica Tan	5
(Australia) Hung Meng-hsia	7
(South Africa) Nicola Rossouw	2
(China) Han Fang	7
(Chinese Taipei) Ho-Yun Chen	7
(China) Meng Gao	5
1st playoff round
(South Korea) Kim Ga-young	7
(Singapore) Jessica Tan	6
(South Africa) Nicola Rossouw	1
(China) Meng Gao	7

Winner's Round
(China) Xiaotong Zhang	7
(Australia) Hung Meng-hsia	6
(China) Han Fang	4
(Chinese Taipei) Ho-Yun Chen	7
2nd playoff round
(South Korea) Kim Ga-young	7
(China) Hang Fan	4
(China) Meng Gao	7
(Australia) Hung Meng-hsia	3

=== Group E ===
Main Round
(Philippines) Chezka Centeno	7
(South Korea) Bo Geon Kim	4
(Netherlands) Tamara Peeters-Rademakers	2
(China) Tianqi Shi	7
(China) XiaZhi Liu	7
(Chinese Taipei) Liu Shin-mei	5
(China) Fan Yang	7
(China) Ge Bai	4
1st playoff round
(South Korea) Bo Geon Kim	7
(Netherlands) Tamara Peeters-Rademakers	5
(Chinese Taipei) Liu Shin-mei	6
(China) Ge Bai	7

Winner's Round
(Philippines) Chezka Centeno	7
(China) Tianqi Shi	3
(China) XiaZhi Liu	5
(China) Fan Yang	7
2nd playoff round
(South Korea) Bo Geon Kim	2
(China) XiaZhi Liu	7
(China) Ge Bai	7
(China) Tianqi Shi	5

=== Group F ===
Main Round
(Japan) Chihiro Kawahara	7
(Russia) Natalia Seroshtan	2
(China) Langtong Fan	5
(China) Danhong Sun	7
(Mongolia) Bayarsaikhan Narantuya	5
(Japan) Miyuki Kuribayashi	7
(Japan) Yuki Hiraguchi	7
(Chinese Taipei) Chen Chia-hua	6
1st playoff round
(Russia) Natalia Seroshtan	7
(China) Langtong Fan	5
(Mongolia) Bayarsaikhan Narantuya	2
(Chinese Taipei) Chen Chia-hua	7

Winner's Round
(Japan) Chihiro Kawahara	6
(China) Danhong Sun	7
(Japan) Miyuki Kuribayashi	7
(Japan) Yuki Hiraguchi	0
2nd playoff round
(Russia) Natalia Seroshtan	5
(Japan) Yuki Hiraguchi	7
(Chinese Taipei) Chen Chia-hua	7
(Japan) Chihiro Kawahara	4

=== Group G ===
Main Round
(United Kingdom) Kelly Fisher	7
(Mongolia) Dashdendev Otgontuya	0
(Mongolia) Battulga Uyanga	4
(Austria) Jasmin Ouschan	7
(China) MuYan Zhang	5
(China) Yuying Xia	7
(China) Xiaochun Zheng	3
(Chinese Taipei) Wei Tzu-chien	7
1st playoff round
(Mongolia) Dashdendev Otgontuya	3
(Mongolia) Batulga Uyanga	7
(China) MuYan Zhang	5
(China) Xiaochun Zheng	7

Winner's Round
(United Kingdom) Kelly Fisher	7
(Austria) Jasmin Ouschan	5
(China) Yuying Xia	7
(Chinese Taipei) Wei Tzu-chien	3
2nd playoff round
(Mongolia) Battulga Uyanga	0
(Chinese Taipei) Wei Tzu-chien	7
(China) Xiaochun Zheng	7
(Austria) Jasmin Ouschan	5

=== Group H ===
Main Round
(Chinese Taipei) Chieh-Yu Chou	6
(China) Xue Chen	7
(China) Fu Xiaofang	7
(Japan) Akimi Kajitani	5
(Argentina) Ayala Soledad	7
(United States) Shanelle Lorraine	4
(New Zealand) Molrudee Kasemchaiyanan	4
(China) Pan Xiaoting	7
1st playoff round
(Chinese Taipei) Chieh-Yu Chou	7
(Japan) Akimi Kajitani	6
(United States) Shanelle Lorraine	2
(New Zealand) Molrudee Kasemchaiyanan	7

Winner's Round
(China) Xue Chen	7
(China) Fu Xiaofang	4
(Argentina) Ayala Soledad	2
(China) Pan Xiaoting	7
2nd playoff round
(Chinese Taipei) Chieh-Yu Chou	7
(Argentina) Ayala Soledad	1
(New Zealand) Molrudee Kasemchaiyanan	6
(China) Fu Xiaofang	7

== Main tournament - Last 32 ==
Knockout stage consisted of last 32 players. Defending champion - Han Yu was defeated by Pan Xiaoting in semi-finals 5–9.

1st Round
(England) Kelly Fisher	9
(China) Xiaochun Zheng	8
(South Korea) Kim Ga-young	7
(China) Yuying Xia	9
(China) Xue Chen	3
(Chinese Taipei) Chou Chieh-yu	9
(China) Zhou Doudou	9
(Philippines) Rubilen Amit	7
(China) Liu Shasha	9
(Japan) Yuki Hiraguchi	2
(China) Teng Jiang	9
(South Korea) Eunji Park	6
(Singapore) Shu Wah Hoe	5
(Costa Rica) Adriana Villar	9
(China) Meng Gao	4
(China) Chen Siming	9
(Japan) Miyuki Kuribayashi	3
(South Korea) Yun mi Lim	9
(Chinese Taipei) Chen Chia-hua	9
(China) Danhong Sun	5
(China) Fan Yang	5
(China) Ge Bai	9
(China) Xiaotong Wang	5
(China) Pan Xiaoting	9
(Philippines) Chezka Centeno	9
(China) Xia-Zhi Liu	7
(China) Fu Xiaofang	8
(China) Xiaotong Zhang	9
(Chinese Taipei) Tan Ho-yun	6
(China) Han Yu	9
(Chinese Taipei) Wei Tzu-chien	4
(Chinese Taipei) Sze-Ting Kuo	9

2nd Round
(England) Kelly Fisher	9
(China) Yuying Xia	6
(Chinese Taipei) Chou Chieh-yu	9
(China) Zhou Doudou	8
(China) Liu Shasha	9
(China) Jiang Teng	7
(Costa Rica) Adriana Villar	1
(China) Chen Siming	9
(Singapore) Yun Mi Lim	5
(Chinese Taipei) Chen Chia-hua	9
(China) Ge Bai	3
(China) Pan Xiaoting	9
(Philippines) Chezka Centeno	8
(China) Xiaotong Zhang	9
(Chinese Taipei) Han Yu	9
(Chinese Taipei) Szu-Ting Kuo	7

Quarterfinals
(England) Kelly Fisher	4
(Chinese Taipei) Chou Chieh-yu	9
(China) Liu Shasha	1
(China) Chen Siming	9
(Chinese Taipei) Chen Chia-hua	8
(China) Pan Xiaoting	9
(China) Xiaotong Zhang	5
(China) Han Yu	9

Semifinals
(Chinese Taipei) Chen Chia-hua	8
(China) Chen Siming	9
(China) Pan Xiaoting	5
(China) Han Yu	9

Finals
(China) Chen Siming	9
(China) Pan Xiaoting	7

=== Final ===
The final was played between two Chinese players - Chen Siming and Pan Xiaoting. Alternate break format was played. Chen Siming had three break-and-run in racks: 8, 10 and 12. Pan Xiaoting had two break-and-run in racks 1 and 3.

Player	Lag																Score
Player	Lag	1	2	3	4	5	6	7	8	9	10	11	12	13	14	15	Score
(China) Chen Siming			1				1	1	1	1	1	1	1			1	9
(China) Pan Xiaoting	X	1		1	1	1								1	1		7
