= 2015 WPA Women's World Nine-ball Championship =

Tournament information
- Dates: 5–8 November 2015
- Venue: Guilin Stadium
- City: Guilin
- Country: China
- Organisation: World Pool-Billiard Association
- Format: Double elimination / single elimination
- Discipline: Nine-ball
- Total prize fund: $300,000
- Winner's share: $40,000

Final
- Champion: Liu Shasha (CHN)
- Runner-up: Jasmin Ouschan (AUT)
- Score: 9–4

The 2015 WPA Women's World Nine-ball Championship was a professional nine-ball pool championship that took place from 5 to 8 November 2015. It was the 24th edition of the WPA Women's World Nine-ball Championship and was held at the Guilin Stadium in Guilin, China. The tournament featured a field of 64 players, with a preliminary double-elimination stage followed by a single-elimination tournament bracket for the final 32 players. The event was sanctioned by the World Pool-Billiard Association (WPA). Liu Shasha won her third world title, defeating Jasmin Ouschan 9–4 in the final. Liu was the first Asian player to win three world titles.

== Prize money ==
The total prize fund for the event remained $300,000, with the winner receiving $40,000. A breakdown of the prize money is shown below:

Position	Prize money
Winner	$40,000
Runner-up	$20,000
Semi-finalist	$10,000
Quarter-finalist	$6,000
Last 16	$3,000
Last 32	$1,500
Last 64	$750
Total	$300,000

== Knockout stage ==
The following is the results from the knockout stage (Last 16 onwards). Players in bold denote match winners.

Round of 16
**Liu Shasha (CHN)**	**9**
Kim Ga-young (KOR)	2
**Gao Meng (CHN)**	**9**
Wang Xiaotong (CHN)	5
**Chihiro Kawahara (JPN)**	**9**
Allison Fisher (GBR)	4
**Chou Chieh-yu (TPE)**	**9**
Xue Chen (CHN)	5
**Jasmin Ouschan (AUT)**	**9**
Chen Siming (CHN)	2
**Rubilen Amit (PHI)**	**9**
Tan Ho-yun (TPE)	7
**Pan Xiaoting (CHN)**	**9**
Zhou Doudou (CHN)	3
**Lin Yuan-chun (TPE)**	**9**
Kelly Fisher (GBR)	6

Quarter-finals
**Liu Shasha (CHN)**	**9**
Gao Meng (CHN)	4
**Chihiro Kawahara (JPN)**	**9**
Chou Chieh-yu (TPE)	7
**Jasmin Ouschan (AUT)**	**9**
Rubilen Amit (PHI)	7
**Pan Xiaoting (CHN)**	**9**
Lin Yuan-chun (TPE)	3

Semi-finals
**Liu Shasha (CHN)**	**9**
Chihiro Kawahara (JPN)	8
**Jasmin Ouschan (AUT)**	**9**
Pan Xiaoting (CHN)	6

Final
**Liu Shasha (CHN)**	**9**
Jasmin Ouschan (AUT)	4
