= 2014 WPA Women's World Nine-ball Championship =

Tournament information
- Dates: 12–18 October 2014
- Venue: Guilin Stadium
- City: Guilin
- Country: China
- Organisation: World Pool-Billiard Association
- Format: Double elimination / single elimination
- Discipline: Nine-ball
- Total prize fund: $300,000
- Winner's share: $40,000
- Defending champion: Han Yu

Final
- Champion: Liu Shasha (CHN)
- Runner-up: Chen Siming (CHN)
- Score: 9–8

The 2014 WPA Women's World Nine-ball Championship was a professional nine-ball pool championship that took place from 12 to 18 October 2014. It was the 23rd edition of the WPA Women's World Nine-ball Championship and was held at the Guilin Stadium in Guilin, China. The tournament featured a field of 64 players, with a preliminary double-elimination stage followed by a single-elimination tournament bracket for the final 32 players. The event was sanctioned by the World Pool-Billiard Association (WPA). Liu Shasha won her second world title, defeating Chen Siming 9–8 in the final.

== Prize money ==
The total prize fund for the event was $300,000, with the winner receiving $40,000. A breakdown of the prize money is shown below:

Position	Prize money
Winner	$40,000
Runner-up	$20,000
Semi-finalist	$10,000
Quarter-finalist	$6,000
Last 16	$3,000
Last 32	$1,500
Last 64	$750
Total	$300,000

== Knockout stage ==
The following is the results from the knockout stage of the event. Players in bold denote match winners.

Round of 16
**Kim Ga-young (KOR)**	**9**
Akimi Kajitani (JPN)	5
**Han Yu (CHN)**	**9**
Fu Xiaofang (CHN)	3
**Liu Shasha (CHN)**	**9**
Jiang Teng (CHN)	5
**Angeline Ticoalu (INA)**	**9**
Kuo Szu-ting (TPE)	4
**Chen Siming (CHN)**	**9**
Chou Chieh-yu (TPE)	3
**Wei Tzu-chien (TPE)**	**9**
Pan Xiaoting (CHN)	8
**Tan Ho-yun (TPE)**	**9**
Allison Fisher (GBR)	5
**Zhou Doudou (CHN)**	**9**
Karen Corr (IRL)	8

Quarter-finals
**Kim Ga-young (KOR)**	**9**
Han Yu (CHN)	8
**Liu Shasha (CHN)**	**9**
Angeline Ticoalu (INA)	5
**Chen Siming (CHN)**	**9**
Wei Tzu-chien (TPE)	5
**Tan Ho-yun (TPE)**	**9**
Zhou Doudou (CHN)	5

Semi-finals
Kim Ga-young (KOR)	7
**Liu Shasha (CHN)**	**9**
**Chen Siming (CHN)**	**9**
Tan Ho-yun (TPE)	5

Final
**Liu Shasha (CHN)**	**9**
Chen Siming (CHN)	8
