= Amway Cup =

- Sport: Nine-ball
- Founded: 1998
- Founder: WPA, APBU
- Most recent champion: Chen Siming (CHN) (2018)

The Amway Cup (officially the Amway eSpring Women's World 9-Ball Open) was a professional nine-ball tournament held annually in Taipei, Taiwan. The tournament was founded in 1998 to promote women's cue sports in Asia. It was a major ranking event for the World Pool Association (WPA). Events were played with a group stage followed by a knockout round.

== Past Winners ==
Year	Champion	Runner-up	Score	Ref.
1998	Allison Fisher (GBR)	Jennifer Chen (TPE)	11–8	
1999	Allison Fisher (GBR)	Liu Shin-mei (TPE)	11–5	
2000	Jennifer Chen (TPE)	Allison Fisher (GBR)	11–6	
2001	Allison Fisher (GBR)	Liu Shin-mei (TPE)	11–9	
2002	Allison Fisher (GBR)	Liu Shin-mei (TPE)	11–8	
2003	Tournament not held			
2004	Kim Ga-young (KOR)	Jennifer Chen (TPE)	11–8	
2005	Tournament not held			
2006	Allison Fisher (GBR)	Kim Ga-young (KOR)	11–10	
2007	Pan Xiaoting (CHN)	Rubilen Amit (PHI)	11–5	
2008	Lin Yuan-chun (TPE)	Kim Ga-young (KOR)	11–7	
2009	Chou Chieh-yu (TPE)	Kim Ga-young (KOR)	11–10	
2010	Cha Yu-ram (KOR)	Kim Ga-young (KOR)	11–5	
2011	Kim Ga-young (KOR)	Chen Siming (CHN)	11–9	
2012	Chou Chieh-yu (TPE)	Jasmin Ouschan (AUT)	11–9	
2013	Kelly Fisher (GBR)	Chen Siming (CHN)	11–8	
2014	Chou Chieh-yu (TPE)	Kelly Fisher (GBR)	11–8	
2015	Lin Yuan-chun (TPE)	Rubilen Amit (PHI)	11–9	
2016	Jasmin Ouschan (AUT)	Rubilen Amit (PHI)	11–9	
2017	Chen Siming (CHN)	Pan Xiaoting (CHN)	11–8	
2018	Chen Siming (CHN)	Tan Ho-yun (TPE)	11–4	
