= 2012 WPA Women's World Nine-ball Championship =

Tournament information
- Dates: 18–21 June 2012
- Venue: Richgate Shopping Center
- City: Shenyang
- Country: China
- Organisation: World Pool-Billiard Association
- Format: Double elimination / single elimination
- Discipline: Nine-ball
- Total prize fund: $300,000
- Winner's share: $40,000
- Defending champion: Bi Zhu Qing

Final
- Champion: Kelly Fisher (GBR)
- Runner-up: Fu Xiaofang (CHN)
- Score: 9–6

The 2012 WPA Women's World Nine-ball Championship was a professional nine-ball pool championship that took place from 18 to 21 June 2012. It was the 21st edition of the WPA Women's World Nine-ball Championship and was held at the Richgate Shopping Center in Shenyang, China. The tournament featured a field of 64 players, competing in a double-elimination format for the preliminary stages, transitioning to a single-elimination tournament bracket for the final 32 players. The event was sanctioned by the World Pool-Billiard Association (WPA) and organized in conjunction with the Chinese Billiards and Snooker Association (CBSA). Kelly Fisher won the event, defeating Fu Xiaofang 9–6 in the final. Fisher won Billiards Digest Player of the Year awards following the event.

== Prize money ==
The total prize fund for the event was $160,000. A "most stylish award" of $20,000 was also offered. The winner of the event received $40,000. A breakdown of the prize money is shown below:

Position	Prize money
Winner	$40,000
Runner-up	$20,000
Semi-finalist	$10,000
Quarter-finalist	$6,000
Last 16	$3,000
Last 32	$1,500
Last 64	$750
Total	$160,000

== Knockout stage ==
The following is the results from the knockout stage of the event. Players in bold denote match winners.

Round of 16
**Kelly Fisher (GBR)**	**9**
Line Kjørsvik (NOR)	8
**Lin Yuan-chun (TPE)**	**9**
Wei Tzu-chien (TPE)	3
**Tsai Pei-chen (TPE)**	**9**
Park Eun-ji (KOR)	4
**Kim Ga-young (KOR)**	**9**
Han Yu (CHN)	7
**Fu Xiaofang (CHN)**	**9**
Brittany Bryant (CAN)	1
**Chou Chieh-yu (TPE)**	**9**
Bai Ge (CHN)	5
**Liu Shasha (CHN)**	**9**
Kharla La Rosa (VEN)	1
**Chen Siming (CHN)**	**9**
Pan Xiaoting (CHN)	7

Quarter-finals
**Kelly Fisher (GBR)**	**9**
Lin Yuan-chun (TPE)	5
**Tsai Pei-chen (TPE)**	**9**
Kim Ga-young (25x17px)	7
**Fu Xiaofang (CHN)**	**9**
Chou Chieh-yu (TPE)	6
**Liu Shasha (CHN)**	**9**
Chen Siming (CHN)	3

Semi-finals
**Kelly Fisher (GBR)**	**9**
Tsai Pei-chen (TPE)	4
**Fu Xiaofang (CHN)**	**9**
Liu Shasha (CHN)	8

Final
**Kelly Fisher (GBR)**	**9**
Fu Xiaofang (CHN)	6
