= 2011 WPA Women's World Nine-ball Championship =

Tournament information
- Dates: September 19–25, 2011
- Venue: Sunrise International Hotel
- City: Shenyang
- Country: China
- Organisation: World Pool-Billiard Association
- Format: Double elimination / single elimination
- Discipline: Nine-ball
- Total prize fund: $138,000

Final
- Champion: Bi Zhu Qing (CHN)
- Runner-up: Chen Siming (CHN)
- Score: 9–7

The 2011 WPA Women's World Nine-ball Championship was a professional nine-ball pool championship that took place from 19 to 25 September 2011. It was 20th edition of the WPA Women's World Nine-ball Championship and was held in Shenyang, China. The tournament featured a field of 64 players, competing in a double-elimination format for the preliminary stages, transitioning to a single-elimination tournament bracket for the final rounds when there was 32 players. The event was sanctioned by the World Pool-Billiard Association (WPA) and organized in conjunction with the Chinese Billiards and Snooker Association (CBSA). Bi Zhu Qing won the event defeating Chen Siming 9‍–‍7 in the final.

== Prize fund ==
The total prize fund for the 2011 event was $138,000. A breakdown of the prize money is as follows:

Placement	Prize Money (USD)	Total
Winner	$30,000	$30,000
Runner-up	$15,000	$15,000
Third place	$10,000	$10,000
Fourth place	$7,000	$7,000
Quarter-finalists (5th–8th)	$5,000	$20,000
Last 16 (9th–16th)	$3,000	$24,000
Last 32 (17th–32nd)	$2,000	$32,000
Total		$138,000

== Knockout bracket ==
The single-elimination bracket from the event, starting at the round of 16 is shown below:

Round of 16
(China) Fu Xiaofang	9
(China) Pan Xiaoting	8
(China) Bi Zhu Qing	9
(Japan) Chihiro Kawahara	6
(Chinese Taipei) Lin Yuan-chun	9
(China) Wu Jing	0
(South Korea) Kim Ga-young	8
(China) Han Yu	9
(China) Chen Siming	9
(China) Zhou Doudou	3
(China) Liu Shasha	9
(Chinese Taipei) Chou Chieh-yu	8
(United States) Monica Webb	8
(China) Han Fang	9
(China) Gao Meng	9
(Canada) Brittany Bryant	6

Quarter-finals
(China) Fu Xiaofang	8
(China) Bi Zhu Qing	9
(Chinese Taipei) Lin Yuan-chun	7
(China) Han Yu	9
(China) Chen Siming	9
(China) Liu Shasha	7
(China) Han Fang	9
(China) Gao Meng	4

Semi-finals
(China) Bi Zhu Qing	9
(China) Han Yu	7
(China) Chen Siming	9
(China) Han Fang	3

Final
(China) Bi Zhu Qing	9
(China) Chen Siming	7
