= 2009 WPA Women's World Nine-ball Championship =

Tournament information
- Dates: 19 November–22 November 2009
- Venue: Sunrise International Hotel
- City: Shenyang
- Country: China
- Organisation: World Pool-Billiard Association
- Format: Double elimination / single elimination
- Discipline: Nine-ball
- Total prize fund: $150,000
- Winner's share: $30,000
- Participants: 64

Final
- Champion: Liu Shasha (CHN)
- Runner-up: Karen Corr (IRE)
- Score: 9–5

The 2009 WPA Women's World Nine-ball Championship was a professional nine-ball pool championship that took place from 19 to 22 November 2009. It was 18th edition of the WPA World Nine-ball Championship and was held in Shenyang, China. It was the first time that the event was held in China.

The tournament featured a field of 64 players, competing in a double-elimination format for the preliminary stages, transitioning to a single-elimination tournament bracket for the final rounds when there was 32 players. The event was sanctioned by the World Pool-Billiard Association (WPA) and organized in conjunction with the Chinese Billiards and Snooker Association (CBSA). Liu Shasha defeated Karen Corr 9‍–‍5 in the final. Liu was only 16 years old, competing in one of her first international tournaments.

== Prize money ==
The total prize fund for the event was $150,000. The winner's share was $30,000. A breakdown of prize money is shown below:

Placement	Prize Money (USD)	Total
Winner	$30,000	$30,000
Runner-up	$15,000	$15,000
Third place	$10,000	$10,000
Fourth place	$7,000	$7,000
Quarter-finalists (5th–8th)	$5,000	$20,000
Last 16 (9th–16th)	$3,000	$24,000
Last 32 (17th–32nd)	$2,000	$32,000
Last 48 (33rd–48th)	$750	$12,000
Total		$150,000

== Knockout bracket ==
The single-elimination bracket from the event, starting at the round of 16 is shown below:

Round of 16
(Chinese Taipei) Chou Chieh-yu	4
(China) Zhou Doudou	9
(United Kingdom) Karen Corr	9
(Chinese Taipei) Tsai Pei-chen	3
(China) Han Fang	8
(China) Fu Xiaofang	9
(China) Chen Xue	9
(United Kingdom) Allison Fisher	8
(China) Pan Xiaoting	9
(China) Gao Meng	4
(South Korea) Cha Yu-ram	9
(Chinese Taipei) Gao Shu-pin	3
(China) Liu Shasha	9
(China) Chen Siming	7
(Chinese Taipei) Liu Shin-mei	9
(Austria) Gerda Hofstatter	5

Quarter-finals
(China) Zhou Doudou	3
(United Kingdom) Karen Corr	9
(China) Fu Xiaofang	9
(China) Chen Xue	2
(China) Pan Xiaoting	9
(South Korea) Cha Yu-ram	4
(China) Liu Shasha	9
(Chinese Taipei) Liu Shin-mei	1

Semi-finals
(United Kingdom) Karen Corr	9
(China) Fu Xiaofang	8
(China) Pan Xiaoting	8
(China) Liu Shasha	9

Final
(United Kingdom) Karen Corr	5
(China) Liu Shasha	9
