= 2010 WPA Women's World Nine-ball Championship =

Tournament information
- Dates: 23 August–30 August 2010
- Venue: Sunrise International Hotel
- City: Shenyang
- Country: China
- Organisation: World Pool-Billiard Association
- Format: Double elimination / single elimination
- Discipline: Nine-ball
- Total prize fund: $150,000

Final
- Champion: Fu Xiaofang (CHN)
- Runner-up: Allison Fisher (GBR)
- Score: 9–7

The 2010 WPA Women's World Nine-ball Championship was a professional nine-ball pool championship that took place from 23 to 30 August 2010. It was 19th edition of the WPA Women's World Nine-ball Championship and was held in Shenyang, China. The tournament featured a field of 64 players, competing in a double-elimination format for the preliminary stages, transitioning to a single-elimination tournament bracket for the final rounds when there was 32 players. The event was sanctioned by the World Pool-Billiard Association (WPA) and organized in conjunction with the Chinese Billiards and Snooker Association (CBSA). Fu Xiaofang won the championship, defeating Allison Fisher 9‍–‍7 in the final.

== Prize money ==
The total prize fund for the 2010 event was $150,000. A breakdown of the prize money is shown below:

Placement	Prize Money (USD)	Total
Winner	$30,000	$30,000
Runner-up	$15,000	$15,000
Semi-finalists (3rd–4th)	$9,000	$18,000
Quarter-finalists (5th–8th)	$5,000	$20,000
Last 16 (9th–16th)	$3,000	$24,000
Last 32 (17th–32nd)	$2,000	$32,000
Last 48 (33rd–48th)	$750	$12,000
Total		$150,000

== Knockout draw ==
Below is the championship draw from the last 16 onwards.

Round of 16
(China) Fu Xiaofang	9
(Chinese Taipei) Lin Yuan-chun	6
(China) Li Jia	7
(China) Liu Shasha	9
(South Korea) Cha Yu-ram	9
(China) Bi Zhuqing	4
(China) Chen Xue	4
(Chinese Taipei) Chou Chieh-yu	9
(Chinese Taipei) Chang Shu-han	9
(China) Han Yu	5
(South Korea) Kim Ga-young	7
(China) Ye Sisi	9
(United Kingdom) Allison Fisher	9
(Austria) Jasmin Ouschan	7
(China) Chen Siming	9
(Chinese Taipei) Liu Shin-mei	5

Quarter-finals
(China) Fu Xiaofang	9
(China) Liu Shasha	8
(South Korea) Cha Yu-ram	8
(Chinese Taipei) Chou Chieh-yu	9
(Chinese Taipei) Chang Shu-han	9
(China) Ye Sisi	2
(United Kingdom) Allison Fisher	9
(China) Chen Siming	6

Semi-finals
(China) Fu Xiaofang	9
(Chinese Taipei) Chou Chieh-yu	5
(Chinese Taipei) Chang Shu-han	5
(United Kingdom) Allison Fisher	9

Final
(China) Fu Xiaofang	9
(United Kingdom) Allison Fisher	7
