= 2016 WPA Women's World Nine-ball Championship =

The 2016 Women's World Nine-ball Championship was a professional nine-ball pool tournament which was held in Emeishan City/Sichuan from 10 to 16 November 2017. The event was organized by the Guoao Group, which has hosted this event from 2013.

Overall 64 players from all around the world was divided into 8 groups of 8 players, where double elimination format was applied. In the group stage all matches were race to 7 with alternate break format. Overall 32 players proceeded to the main tournament – knockout stage. In the knockout stage all matches were played race to 9.

== Prize fund ==
2016 WPA Women's World Nine-ball Championship
Tournament information
- Dates: December 10–16 2016
- City: Emeishan City
- Country: China
- Organisation: World Pool-Billiard Association, Guoao Group
- Format: Double elimination / single elimination
- Discipline: Nine-ball
- Total prize fund: $170,000
- Winner's share: $42,000
- Participants: 64

Final
- Champion: Han Yu (CHN)
- Runner-up: Chihiro Kawahara (JPN)
- Score: 9–7

The prize money for the event is shown below.

Prize money
Position	Prize
First place (champion)	$42,000
Second place (runner-up)	$20,000
3rd - 4th	$10,000
5th - 8th	$6,000
9th - 16th	$3,000
17th - 32nd	$1,500
33rd - 48th	$750
Total	$170,000

== Main tournament - last 32 ==
Knockout stage consisted of last 32 players. Defending champion Liu Shasha was defeated in last 16 by Gao Meng 7–9.

1st Round
(Chinese Taipei) Kuo Szu Ting	5
(Chinese Taipei) Liu Shin-Mei	9
(China) Jiang Teng	9
(South Korea) Choi Sollip	5
(Chinese Taipei) Lin Yuan-Chun	9
Sun Danhong	7
(South Korea) Park Eunji	7
(China) Bai Ge	9
(Chinese Taipei) Wei Tzu-chien	9
(Russia) Natalia Seroshtan	3
(China) Han Yu	9
(United Kingdom) Kelly Fisher	8
(Chinese Taipei) Chen Chia-Hua	8
(Singapore) Tan Hui Ming	9
(Chinese Taipei) Tan Ho-yun	7
(South Korea) Kim Ga-Young	9
(Philippines) Rubilen Amit	8
(Philippines) Chezka Centeno	9
(Japan) Keiko Yukawa	9
(China) Wang Xiaotong	7
(Japan) Yuki Hiraguchi	5
(China) Liu Shasha	9
(China) Xiaoting Pan	4
(China) Gao Meng	9
(China) Zhou DouDou	5
(Japan) Chihiro Kawahara	9
(Chinese Taipei) Chou Chieh-Yu	9
(Ukraine) Kateryna Polovinchuk	2
(China) Chen Siming	9
(South Korea) Hyun Ji-Won	2
(Republic of Ireland) Karen Corr	9
(United Kingdom) Allison Fisher	6

2nd Round
(Chinese Taipei) Liu Shin-Mei	5
(China) Jiang Ten	9
(Chinese Taipei) Lin Yuan-Chun	3
(China) Bai Ge	9
(Chinese Taipei) Wei Tzu-chien	0
(China) Han Yu	9
(Singapore) Tan Hui Ming	0
(South Korea) Ga Young Kim	9
(Philippines) Chezka Centeno	9
(Japan) Keiko Yukawa	5
(China) Liu Shasha	7
(China) Gao Meng	9
(Japan) Chihiro Kawahara	9
(Chinese Taipei) Chou Chieh-Yu	4
(China) Chen Siming	4
(Republic of Ireland) Karen Corr	9

Quarterfinals
(China) Jiang Teng	2
(China) Bai Ge	9
(China) Han Yu	9
(South Korea) Ga Young Kim	6
(Philippines) Chezka Centeno	8
(China) Gao Meng	9
(Japan) Chihiro Kawahara	9
(Republic of Ireland) Karen Corr	5

Semifinals
(China) Bai Ge	4
(China) Han Yu	9
(China) Gao Meng	8
(Japan) Chihiro Kawahara	9

Finals
(China) Han Yu	9
(Japan) Chihiro Kawahara	7
