= 2019 WPA Women's World Nine-ball Championship =

Tournament information
- Dates: December 16–19 2019
- City: Sanya
- Country: China
- Organisation: World Pool-Billiard Association
- Format: Double elimination / Single elimination
- Discipline: Nine-ball
- Total prize fund: $175,000
- Winner's share: $44,000

Final
- Champion: Kelly Fisher (ENG)
- Runner-up: Jasmin Ouschan (AUT)
- Score: 9–7

The 2019 WPA Women's World Nine-ball Championship was a professional nine-ball pool tournament that took place at Jinghai International Holiday Hotel & Resort in Sanya, China from 16 to 19 December 2019.

Kelly Fisher won the title with a 9–7 victory over Jasmin Ouschan in the final, remaining undefeated in seven matches during the tournament. It was Fisher's second Women's World Nine-ball Championship win, following her first in 2012.

== Format ==
The 64 players who had been qualified for the Women's World Nine-Ball Championship were divided in 8 groups (each group had 8 players). In the group stage, the double elimination was played and all matches were race to 7. From each group four players qualified for the final round (Last 32).

=== Prize fund ===
The prize money for the event is shown below.

Prize money
Position	Prize
First place (Champion)	$44,000
Second place (Runner-up)	$22,000
Third place (Semi-finalist)	$11,000
Fifth place (Quarter-finalist)	$6,000
Ninth place (loser in last 16)	$3,000
Seventeenth place (loser in last 32)	$1,500
Thirty third place (loser in last 64)	$800
Total	$175,000

== Knockout draw ==
The results for the knockout stage (Last 16) is shown below.

Last 16
(Philippines) Rubilen Amit	9
(Chinese Taipei) Wang Wan-Lin	8
(China) Bai Ge	9
(Belarus) Marharyta Fefilava	8
(Chinese Taipei) Wei Tsu-Chian	4
(China) Fu Xiaofang	9
(Austria) Jasmin Ouschan	9
(China) Zhang Muyan	7
(England) Kelly Fisher	9
(South Korea) Park Eun Ji	0
(China) Liu Shasha	9
(China) Huang Qingning	3
(Chinese Taipei) Tan Ho-yun	4
(China) Han Yu	9
(China) Zhou Doudou	9
(China) Chen Siming	8

Quarter-finals
(Philippines) Rubilen Amit	9
(China) Bai Ge	5
(China) Fu Xiaofang	7
(Austria) Jasmin Ouschan	9
(England) Kelly Fisher	9
(China) Liu Shasha	5
(China) Han Yu	5
(China) Zhou Doudou	9

Semi-finals
(Philippines) Rubilen Amit	2
(Austria) Jasmin Ouschan	9
(England) Kelly Fisher	9
(China) Zhou Doudou	5

Final
(Austria) Jasmin Ouschan	7
(England) Kelly Fisher	9

=== Final ===
The final was played between two European players - Kelly Fisher (England) and Jasmin Ouschan (Austria). Alternate break format was played. Both player have only two break-and-run, Kelly Fisher in the racks no. 6 and 10, Jasmin Ouschan in the racks no. 13 and 15.

Player	Lag	Rack No.																Score
Player	Lag	1	2	3	4	5	6	7	8	9	10	11	12	13	14	15	16	Score
(England) Kelly Fisher		1			1		1	1		1	1		1		1		1	9
(Austria) Jasmin Ouschan	X		1	1		1			1			1		1		1		7
