= Cue sports at the 2010 Asian Games – Women's eight-ball singles =

Women's eight-ball singles at the 2010 Asian Games
- Venue: Asian Games Town Gymnasium
- Dates: 14–18 November 2010
- Competitors: 26 from 13 nations

Medalists
gold medal	Liu Shasha	China
silver medal	Kim Ga-young	South Korea
bronze medal	Chang Shu-han	Chinese Taipei
bronze medal	Chou Chieh-yu	Chinese Taipei

The women's eight-ball singles tournament at the 2010 Asian Games in Guangzhou took place from 14 November to 18 November at Asian Games Town Gymnasium.

== Schedule ==
All times are China Standard Time (UTC+08:00)

Date	Time	Event
Sunday, 14 November 2010	16:30	Preliminary
Wednesday, 17 November 2010	10:00	Last 16
Wednesday, 17 November 2010	16:30	Quarterfinals
Thursday, 18 November 2010	10:00	Semifinals
Thursday, 18 November 2010	16:30	Final

== Results ==
Legend

- WO — Won by walkover

=== Final ===
Final
4	Liu Shasha (CHN)	5
2	Kim Ga-young (KOR)	4

=== Top half ===
Preliminary
Zorigtyn Zoljargal (MGL)	3
Iris Ranola (PHI)	5
Hend Al-Naser (IOC)	3
Indira Gowda (IND)	5
Junko Mitsuoka (JPN)	3
Dương Thúy Vi (VIE)	5
Suhana Dewi Sabtu (MAS)	3
Cha Yu-ram (KOR)	5
Nuzrath Najeeb (MDV)	0
Amy Hoe (SIN)	5

Last 16
1	Chang Shu-han (TPE)	5
Iris Ranola (PHI)	2
Indira Gowda (IND)	4
Dương Thúy Vi (VIE)	5
Chonticha Chitchomnart (THA)	1
Cha Yu-ram (KOR)	5
Amy Hoe (SIN)	0
4	Liu Shasha (CHN)	5

Quarterfinals
1	Chang Shu-han (TPE)	5
Dương Thúy Vi (VIE)	2
Cha Yu-ram (KOR)	4
4	Liu Shasha (CHN)	5

Semifinals
1	Chang Shu-han (TPE)	3
4	Liu Shasha (CHN)	5

=== Bottom half ===
Preliminary
Akimi Kajitani (JPN)	5
Neeta Sanghvi (IND)	3
Chou Chieh-yu (TPE)	5
Đoàn Thị Ngọc Lệ (VIE)	2
Esther Kwan (MAS)	WO
Nourah Al-Busaili (IOC)
Charlene Chai (SIN)	5
Nutcha Kongim (THA)	2
Battulgyn Uyanga (MGL)	0
Rubilen Amit (PHI)	5

Last 16
3	Fu Xiaofang (CHN)	3
Akimi Kajitani (JPN)	5
Chou Chieh-yu (TPE)	5
Neela Ahmed (MDV)	0
Esther Kwan (MAS)	2
Charlene Chai (SIN)	5
Rubilen Amit (PHI)	2
2	Kim Ga-young (KOR)	5

Quarterfinals
Akimi Kajitani (JPN)	4
Chou Chieh-yu (TPE)	5
Charlene Chai (SIN)	2
2	Kim Ga-young (KOR)	5

Semifinals
Chou Chieh-yu (TPE)	2
2	Kim Ga-young (KOR)	5
