= Liu Shasha =

Chinese pool player (born 1993)

Personal information
- Born: July 26, 1993 (age 33) Lankao County, Henan, China

Pool career
- Country: China
- Pool games: Nine-ball, ten-ball, Chinese eight-ball

Tournament wins
- World Champion: Nine-ball (2009, 2014, 2015); Team (2014)
- Current rank: 16
- Highest rank: 1

Liu Shasha
- Traditional Chinese: 劉莎莎
- Simplified Chinese: 刘莎莎
Transcriptions
Standard Mandarin
- Hanyu Pinyin: Liú Shāshā
- Bopomofo: ㄌㄧㄡˊ ㄕㄚ ㄕㄚ
- Tongyong Pinyin: Lióu Shasha

Sha Sha Liu (also known as Liu Shasha, born July 26, 1993) is a Chinese professional pool player. She is one of the most successful female nine-ball players of all time, having won the WPA Women's World Nine-ball Championship on three occasions, in 2009, 2014 and 2015. Aged 16 years old in 2009, she is the youngest world nine-ball champion ever, and won the event on her international debut. In addition to her three World nine-ball championships, she also reached the final of the WPA World Heyball Championship in 2018.

A former World Pool Association world number one, she is five time finalist of the China 9-Ball Open, she won the event in 2013. She won the eight-ball event at the 2010 Asian Games, and got a bronze medal in the ten-ball event at the 2025 World Games. Having grown up in the same small village as Fu Xiaofang, the two are known as "billiard sisters". The two both won the WPA Women's World Nine-ball Championship in back-to-back years in 2009 and 2010.

== Early life ==
Liu was born on July 26, 1993, in Lankao County, Henan Province, to mother Cao Yumei and father Liu Dongbo. She grew up in Bailou Village in Bailou Township, the same village as Fu Xiaofang, who was already a member of the national billiards team. The families of both lived next to each other, and after Liu dropped out of school aged 12, Fu suggested she learned how to play billiards. Her father took her to Jiamusi to learn with Fu in 2005. Poverty-stricken, she was left in Jiamusi for two years with 200 Chinese yuan, of which she would only spend 50. Initially, Liu worked in the pool hall and was only supposed to be a sparring partner for Fu. In 2007, Liu switched from billiards to play nine-ball under new coach Zhang Shuchun. The training regimen was strict, with Liu playing for 10 hours a day, not owning a mobile phone and one day off a month. Liu and Fu's upbringing from the same village and similar paths to professionals earned them a nickname of "billiard sisters".

== Career ==
=== First World championship (2009–2012) ===
Liu entered her first international tournament as she travelled to Hyōgo Prefecture, Japan to play in the 2009 All Japan Championship. She reached the semi-finals before losing 4‍–‍9 to Lim Yun-Mi. Just one week later, she travelled back to China, and as a wild card was entered into the 2009 WPA Women's World Nine-ball Championship, being held in China for the first time. In a field of 64 players, she made it to the single-elimination rounds before defeating Tamara Rademakers 9‍–‍4, Chen Siming 9‍–‍7 and Pan Xiaoting 9‍–‍8 to reach the final. Her opponent in the final, Karen Corr won five of the first six racks to lead 5‍–‍1. Liu completed six break and runs in the next eight racks to win the match and the tournament 9‍–‍5. Aged 16, she was the youngest winner of the event. Liu awarded the grand prize of the event – $30,000 – to her coach. She was both the youngest winner of the event and the first to win coming through qualification. Following the win, Liu won China Central Television's "Best Non-Olympic Athlete of the Year" award at their Sports Personality of the Year event.

Liu was awarded a place at the 2010 Amway Cup as reigning world champion. She progressed from her group, but finished in the round of 32. In defending her World nine-ball championship in 2010, Liu defeated Chen Siming to set-up a semi-final match against Fu. Liu was unable to win the match, as she lost to Fu 6‍–‍9, but did win the third place match against Shu-Han Chung. Fu, who had celebrated Liu's victory in 2009, won the event, with back-to-back World championships for the pair from the same village. She competed in the 2010 China 9-Ball Open, reaching the quarter-finals, where she played her opponent from the 2009 World final Karen Corr, losing 2‍–‍9. Competing at the 2010 Asian Games, Liu was playing her first international eight-ball tournament, she reached the final and played Kim Ga-young. With the match at hill-hill, Kim had a shot to win the match on the 8-ball, but missed, allowing Liu to win the match and tournament. This was the first Asian Games victory for a Chinese player in pool.

Liu reached the last-16 stage of the 2011 Amway Cup, but lost 6‍–‍7 to Jasmin Ouschan. She participated in a ten-ball event, the Philippines Open, where she lost in the semi-finals to Kelly Fisher. Liu, however, did defeat Alison Fisher at the Beijing Open last 16, before being defeated in the quarter-finals by Chou Chieh-Yu. At the 2011 WPA Women's World Nine-ball Championship, she reached the quarter-finals again, losing to Han Yu. She also took part in the WPA World Ten-ball Championship, she reached the quarter-finals again, losing 1‍–‍9 to Kim Ga-Young. She reached the semi-finals of the 2012 WPA Women's World Nine-ball Championship, despite going to hill-hill with Kelly Fisher, she lost 8‍–‍9. Competing again at the 2012 World ten-ball championship, she played Fu again, losing 6‍–‍8.

=== Back-to-back World Championships (2013–2015) ===
Liu won her first tournament since the 2010 Asian Games at the 2013 China Open. She defeated Chen Siming 9‍–‍8 in the final. She reached WPA world number two following the win. At the 2013 WPA Women's World Nine-ball Championship, she reached the semi-finals, before being defeated by Lin Yuan-Chun. Competing at the 2013 WPA World Ten-ball Championship, she lost 8‍–‍9 to Park Eunji in the last 16. In defence of her China Open title, she reached the semi-finals of the 2014 event, losing to eventual champion Han Yu 4‍–‍9. At the 2014 World Team Championship, she partnered Fu, Liu Haitao, Dang Jinhu and Wang Can. The team won their group and the knockout matches without losing a match and won the tournament with a 4‍–‍2 win in the final over the Philippines team.

Liu competed at the 2014 WPA Women's World Nine-ball Championship; completing victories over Gao Meng, Jiang Teng, Angeline Ticoalu and Kim Ga-Young to reach the final for the second time. She played Chen Simeng, with both players being 21 years old. In a race-to-9 match, Siming led 7‍–‍5 and 8‍–‍6, but Liu won the next three racks to win the match and championship. On winning her second world title, Liu commented that she had considered giving up pool having not had great form coming into the tournament, but family encouragement had prevented it. She said "last year I was under so much pressure that I thought about quitting pool and I didn't know if I could improve" and "Winning this year is a better feeling and it's more important than when I won in 2009".

Liu reached the final of the next tournament, the 2014 All Japan Championship, where she lost 3‍–‍9 to Wu Zhi-Ting. She competed at the 2015 China Open, reaching the last 16 where she lost 2‍–‍9 to Kelly Fisher. In defending her world nine-ball championship at the 2015 WPA Women's World Nine-ball Championship, she reached the final again, where she played Ouschan. Liu won five out of the first six racks and completed a 9‍–‍4 victory. This was her third world nine-ball title, the first Asian player to do so.

=== Two China Open finals (2016–2019) ===
At the 2016 China Open, Liu reached the final for the second time. She played Han Yu in the final. Despite leading 8‍–‍5, she lost the match 8‍–‍9. In defending her world nine-ball championship at the 2016 WPA Women's World Nine-ball Championship she was only able to reach the last 16 stage, being defeated 7‍–‍9 by Gao Meng. Liu had led 6‍–‍2, but was unable to win the match. She lost her place as world number one at the end of the tournament. Liu reached the semi-final of the 2017 Amway Cup, where she was beaten by Pan Xiaoting 6‍–‍9. She did defeat Pan in the quarter-finals and then Fu in the semi-finals of the 2017 China Open. She played Chen Siming in her third China Open final, losing 8‍–‍9. With the score being the reverse of the 2014 World nine-ball final, Chen said "this time, I've given you a taste of your own medicine." Competing at the 2017 WPA Women's World Nine-ball Championship, Liu reached the quarter-finals, but lost 1‍–‍9 to eventual winner Chen. She played in the ladies events of the 2017 WPA World Heyball Championship, losing in the quarter-finals.

In 2018, she reached the quarter-finals of the Amway Cup, losing 2‍–‍9 to Siming. She reached the semi-finals of the 2018 China Open, but lost a hill-hill game to Kelly Fisher. Liu played in the 2018 WPA Women's World Nine-ball Championship, but was defeated in the last 16 by Jiang Teng. Playing at the 2018 World Heyball championship, she reached the final, her fourth World championship final. She played Han in the final, trailing 5‍–‍13, fought back to 14‍–‍15 behind, but eventually lost 14‍–‍17. In September, Liu won the Chinese Billiards International Open, defeating Wang Ye 9‍–‍7. Liu reached her fourth straight China Open semi-final in 2019, this time losing 5‍–‍9 to Rubilen Amit. She then reached the quarter-finals of the 2019 WPA Women's World Nine-ball Championship, losing to Kelly Fisher 5‍–‍9.

=== Post-COVID-19 restrictions (2023–present) ===
Travel and international play for Chinese athletes was disrupted by the COVID-19 pandemic. Liu returned to play in August 2023 in a national team selection competition. She competed at the returning 2023 China Open, which had not been held since 2019. She defeated Fan Langtong, Bai Ge, and Pia Filler to reach the China Open final for the fourth time. She was defeated in the final by Han 7‍–‍9. Returning for the 2024 WPA Women's World Nine-ball Championship, she reached the quarter-finals, where she lost 2‍–‍3 in sets to Kristina Tkach. She played at the 2024 All Japan championship, reaching the semi-finals, where she lost to Wang Xiaotong.

Liu entered the 2024 Asian ten-ball championship where she reached the final, and defeated Rubilen Amit in the final 7‍–‍6. The win meant that Liu would play in the ten-ball event at the 2025 World Games. At the World Games, she reached the semi-finals, but lost to Chezka Centeno 4‍–‍7. Liu won the bronze medal, defeating Ina Kaplan 7‍–‍6. The same year, she reached her fifth China Open final, this time being defeated by Chihiro Kawahara 7‍–‍9. In December, she entered her first Euro Tour event, the 2025 Spanish Open. She defeated Ouschan 8‍–‍3 in the final to win the event.

== Personal life ==
Liu married on September 10 in Panjin, Liaoning Province, two days after the 2019 China Open. The ceremony was attended by Chinese national team players Han Yu, Fu Xiaofang and Chen Siming. As of 2026, she has two children.

== Titles ==
- China Open 9-ball Championship (2026)
- Euro Tour Spanish Open (2025)
- Asian Ten-ball Women's Championship (2024)
- Chinese Billiards International Open (2018)
- WPA Women's World Nine-ball Championship (2015)
- WPA Women's World Nine-ball Championship (2014)
- WPA World Team Championship (2014)
- China Open 9-ball Championship (2013)
- Asian Games (Eight-ball 2010)
- WPA Women's World Nine-ball Championship (2009)
