= Cue sports at the 2006 Asian Games – Women's eight-ball singles =

Women's eight-ball singles at the 2006 Asian Games
- Venue: Al-Sadd Multi-Purpose Hall
- Dates: 8–9 December 2006
- Competitors: 20 from 10 nations

Medalists
gold medal	Lin Yuan-chun	Chinese Taipei
silver medal	Kim Ga-young	South Korea
bronze medal	Pan Xiaoting	China

The women's eight-ball singles tournament at the 2006 Asian Games in Doha took place from 8 December to 9 December at Al-Sadd Multi-Purpose Hall.

== Schedule ==
All times are Arabia Standard Time (UTC+03:00)

Date	Time	Event
Friday, 8 December 2006	10:00	Round of 32
Friday, 8 December 2006	13:00	Round of 16
Friday, 8 December 2006	19:00	Quarterfinals
Saturday, 9 December 2006	10:00	Semifinals
Saturday, 9 December 2006	16:00	Finals

== Results ==
=== Finals ===
Gold medal match
Lin Yuan-chun (TPE)	7
Kim Ga-young (KOR)	6

Bronze medal match
Pan Xiaoting (CHN)	7
Zhou Mengmeng (CHN)	0

=== Top half ===
Round of 32
Rubilen Amit (PHI)	7
Chitra Magimairaj (IND)	2
Pan Xiaoting (CHN)	7
Charlene Chai (SIN)	0

Round of 16
Lin Yuan-chun (TPE)	7
Miyuki Fuke (JPN)	6
Suhana Dewi Sabtu (MAS)	5
Cha Yu-ram (KOR)	7
Rubilen Amit (PHI)	4
Santhinee Jaisuekul (THA)	7
Pan Xiaoting (CHN)	7
Nada Abdullah (SYR)	0

Quarterfinals
Lin Yuan-chun (TPE)	7
Cha Yu-ram (KOR)	6
Santhinee Jaisuekul (THA)	4
Pan Xiaoting (CHN)	7

Semifinals
Lin Yuan-chun (TPE)	7
Pan Xiaoting (CHN)	5

=== Bottom half ===
Round of 32
Zhou Mengmeng (CHN)	7
Anuja Thakur (IND)	3
Amy Hoe (SIN)	6
Mary Ann Basas (PHI)	7

Round of 16
Vana Degermanji (SYR)	0
Zhou Mengmeng (CHN)	7
Akio Otani (JPN)	2
Mary Ann Basas (PHI)	7
Vutthiphan Kongkaket (THA)	1
Kim Ga-young (KOR)	7
Esther Kwan (MAS)	2
Liu Shin-mei (TPE)	7

Quarterfinals
Zhou Mengmeng (CHN)	7
Mary Ann Basas (PHI)	6
Kim Ga-young (KOR)	7
Liu Shin-mei (TPE)	4

Semifinals
Zhou Mengmeng (CHN)	1
Kim Ga-young (KOR)	7
