= Cue sports at the 2010 Asian Games – Women's nine-ball singles =

Women's nine-ball singles at the 2010 Asian Games
- Venue: Asian Games Town Gymnasium
- Dates: 15–19 November 2010
- Competitors: 26 from 13 nations

Medalists
gold medal	Pan Xiaoting	China
silver medal	Chou Chieh-yu	Chinese Taipei
bronze medal	Lin Yuan-chun	Chinese Taipei
bronze medal	Fu Xiaofang	China

The women's nine-ball singles tournament at the 2010 Asian Games in Guangzhou took place from 15 November to 19 November at Asian Games Town Gymnasium.

== Schedule ==
All times are China Standard Time (UTC+08:00)

Date	Time	Event
Monday, 15 November 2010	16:30	Preliminary
Wednesday, 17 November 2010	19:30	Last 16
Thursday, 18 November 2010	13:00	Quarterfinals
Thursday, 18 November 2010	20:00	Semifinals
Friday, 19 November 2010	16:00	Final

== Results ==
=== Final ===
Final
Pan Xiaoting (CHN)	7
Chou Chieh-yu (TPE)	5

=== Top half ===
Preliminary
Dương Thúy Vi (VIE)	7
Nuzrath Najeeb (MDV)	1
Neena Praveen (IND)	3
Junko Mitsuoka (JPN)	7
Nicha Pathomekmongkhon (THA)	7
Zorigtyn Zoljargal (MGL)	5
Cha Yu-ram (KOR)	7
Suhana Dewi Sabtu (MAS)	3
Amy Hoe (SIN)	2
Pan Xiaoting (CHN)	7

Last 16
1	Lin Yuan-chun (TPE)	7
Dương Thúy Vi (VIE)	1
Junko Mitsuoka (JPN)	7
Nicha Pathomekmongkhon (THA)	4
Amenh Al-Msyleem (IOC)	2
Cha Yu-ram (KOR)	7
Pan Xiaoting (CHN)	7
4	Rubilen Amit (PHI)	6

Quarterfinals
1	Lin Yuan-chun (TPE)	7
Junko Mitsuoka (JPN)	5
Cha Yu-ram (KOR)	6
Pan Xiaoting (CHN)	7

Semifinals
1	Lin Yuan-chun (TPE)	3
Pan Xiaoting (CHN)	7

=== Bottom half ===
Preliminary
Charlene Chai (SIN)	4
Akimi Kajitani (JPN)	7
Haifa Al-Naser (IOC)	1
Iris Ranola (PHI)	7
Battulgyn Uyanga (MGL)	2
Đoàn Thị Ngọc Lệ (VIE)	7
Chou Chieh-yu (TPE)	7
Neela Ahmed (MDV)	0
Meenal Thakur (IND)	2
Kim Ga-young (KOR)	7

Last 16
3	Fu Xiaofang (CHN)	7
Akimi Kajitani (JPN)	3
Iris Ranola (PHI)	7
Chonticha Chitchomnart (THA)	2
Đoàn Thị Ngọc Lệ (VIE)	3
Chou Chieh-yu (TPE)	7
Kim Ga-young (KOR)	7
2	Esther Kwan (MAS)	3

Quarterfinals
3	Fu Xiaofang (CHN)	7
Iris Ranola (PHI)	0
Chou Chieh-yu (TPE)	7
Kim Ga-young (KOR)	4

Semifinals
3	Fu Xiaofang (CHN)	6
Chou Chieh-yu (TPE)	7
