= Nine-ball at the 2017 World Games – women's singles =

Nine-ball men's singles at the 2017 World Games
- Venue: Wroclaw Congress Center, Wrocław, Poland
- Dates: 26–29 July 2017
- Competitors: 16 from 13 nations

Medalists
gold medal	(China) Chen Siming
silver medal	(South Korea) Kim Ga-young
bronze medal	(China) Han Yu

The women's singles nine-ball competition at the 2017 World Games took place from 26 to 30 July 2017 at the Wroclaw Congress Center in Wrocław, Poland.

== Bracket ==
Round of 16
(China) Han Yu	9
(Nicaragua) Karen García	0
(Russia) Natalia Seroshtan	5
(Poland) Oliwia Zalewska	9
(Japan) Chihiro Kawahara	9
(South Africa) Nicola Rossouw	3
(United States) Monica Webb	2
(South Korea) Kim Ga-young	9
(Chinese Taipei) Chou Chieh-yu	9
(Germany) Ina Kaplan	1
(New Zealand) Molrudee Kasemchaiyanan	2
(Philippines) Chezka Centeno	9
(United Kingdom) Kelly Fisher	4
(Russia) Kristina Tkach	9
(United States) Jennifer Barretta	7
(China) Chen Siming	9

Quarter-finals
(China) Han Yu	9
(Poland) Oliwia Zalewska	4
(Japan) Chihiro Kawahara	7
(South Korea) Kim Ga-young	9
(Chinese Taipei) Chou Chieh-yu	8
(Philippines) Chezka Centeno	9
(Russia) Kristina Tkach	2
(China) Chen Siming	9

Semi-finals
(China) Han Yu	8
(South Korea) Kim Ga-young	9
(Philippines) Chezka Centeno	6
(China) Chen Siming	9

Final
(South Korea) Kim Ga-young	3
(China) Chen Siming	9
Third place
(China) Han Yu	9
(Philippines) Chezka Centeno	3
