= China 9-Ball Open =

Professional pool event, founded 2009

The China Open 9-Ball Championship is a professional nine-ball pool tournament held annually since 2009. The event is held in Shanghai, China.

== Format ==
Events in the China Open are played firstly in a double-elimination tournament, with a race to nine racks. As soon as only 32 players are left in the tournament the event transitions into a single-elimination tournament and race to 11 racks. In the women's events, the racks are shortened to races to seven and nine respectively.

=== Prize money ===
The winner of the men's tournament receives $40,000, with the total prize money distributed at the men's tournament was different for the individual tournaments. $134,000 was awarded in 2010, $195,200 in 2014. The winner of the women's tournament receives since 2011 $30,000 US dollars, previously it was initially $25,000, then $26,000. Overall, the women's 2014 prize money of $138,000 US dollars was distributed, in 2009, however, only $75,000.

== Results ==
=== Men ===
Year	Location	Winner	Score	Finalist	Semi-finalists
2009	(China) Shanghai	(Germany) Thorsten Hohmann	11–5	(Netherlands) Niels Feijen	(Japan) Yukio Akakariyama
2009	(China) Shanghai	(Germany) Thorsten Hohmann	11–5	(Netherlands) Niels Feijen	(Chinese Taipei) Lu Hui-chan
2010	(China) Shanghai	(Chinese Taipei) Chang Yu-lung	11–7	(Philippines) Antonio Lining	(Philippines) Lee Vann Corteza
2010	(China) Shanghai	(Chinese Taipei) Chang Yu-lung	11–7	(Philippines) Antonio Lining	(China) Liu Haitao
2011	(China) Shanghai	(United Kingdom) Chris Melling	11–3	(Chinese Taipei) Hsu Kai-lun	(Netherlands) Niels Feijen
2011	(China) Shanghai	(United Kingdom) Chris Melling	11–3	(Chinese Taipei) Hsu Kai-lun	(Philippines) Ronato Alcano
2012	(China) Shanghai	(Philippines) Dennis Orcollo	11–9	(Chinese Taipei) Lu Hui-chan	(Chinese Taipei) Chang Yu-lung
2012	(China) Shanghai	(Philippines) Dennis Orcollo	11–9	(Chinese Taipei) Lu Hui-chan	(Japan) Yukio Akakariyama
2013	(China) Shanghai	(Philippines) Lee Vann Corteza	11–6	(Chinese Taipei) Fu Che-wei	(Kuwait) Omar Al-Shaheen
2013	(China) Shanghai	(Philippines) Lee Vann Corteza	11–6	(Chinese Taipei) Fu Che-wei	(China) Wu Jia-qing
2014	(China) Shanghai	(Chinese Taipei) Chang Yu-lung (2)	11–5	(Philippines) Jeffrey Ignacio	(Chinese Taipei) Chang Jung-lin
2014	(China) Shanghai	(Chinese Taipei) Chang Yu-lung (2)	11–5	(Philippines) Jeffrey Ignacio	(Philippines) Carlo Biado
2015	(China) Shanghai	(Austria) Albin Ouschan	11–8	(Canada) John Morra	(China) Chu Bingjie
2015	(China) Shanghai	(Austria) Albin Ouschan	11–8	(Canada) John Morra	(Netherlands) Nick van den Berg
2016	(China) Shanghai	(China) Wu Jia-qing	11–4	(Chinese Taipei) Cheng Yu-hsuan	(Chinese Taipei) Ko Pin-yi
2016	(China) Shanghai	(China) Wu Jia-qing	11–4	(Chinese Taipei) Cheng Yu-hsuan	(Chinese Taipei) Wu Kun-lin
2017	(China) Shanghai	(Germany) Joshua Filler	11–6	(Chinese Taipei) Chang Jung-lin	(Germany) Thorsten Hohmann
2017	(China) Shanghai	(Germany) Joshua Filler	11–6	(Chinese Taipei) Chang Jung-lin	(Chinese Taipei) Cheng Yu-hsuan
2018	(China) Shanghai	(Chinese Taipei) Ko Pin-yi	11–9	(Scotland) Jayson Shaw	(China) Wu Jia-qing
2018	(China) Shanghai	(Chinese Taipei) Ko Pin-yi	11–9	(Scotland) Jayson Shaw	(China) Dang Jinhu
2019	(China) Shanghai	(China) Wu Jia-qing (2)	11–10	(Philippines) Anton Raga	(United States) Shane Van Boening
2019	(China) Shanghai	(China) Wu Jia-qing (2)	11–10	(Philippines) Anton Raga	(Albania) Eklent Kaçi
2023	(China) Shanghai	(Germany) Joshua Filler (2)	11 - 5	(Philippines) Anton Raga	(Chinese Taipei) Wu Kun Lin
2023	(China) Shanghai	(Germany) Joshua Filler (2)	11 - 5	(Philippines) Anton Raga	(Poland) Wojciech Szewczyk
2024	(China) Shanghai	(Germany) Joshua Filler (3)	11 - 6	(Japan) Hayato Hijikata	(Japan) Naoyoki Oi
2024	(China) Shanghai	(Germany) Joshua Filler (3)	11 - 6	(Japan) Hayato Hijikata	(Poland) Konrad Juszczyszyn
2025	(China) Shanghai	(Poland) Wojciech Szewczyk	11 - 5	(China) Dang Jinhu	(Poland) Daniel Macioł
2025	(China) Shanghai	(Poland) Wojciech Szewczyk	11 - 5	(China) Dang Jinhu	(United States) Fedor Gorst
2026	(China) Shanghai	(United States) Fedor Gorst	11 - 3	(Chinese Taipei) Wu Kun-lin	(Poland) Daniel Macioł
2026	(China) Shanghai	(United States) Fedor Gorst	11 - 3	(Chinese Taipei) Wu Kun-lin	(Greece) Alexander Kazakis

==== Top performers ====
Name	Nationality	Winner	Runner-up	Finals	Semi-final or better
**Joshua Filler**	Germany	3	0	3	3
Wu Jia-qing	China	2	0	2	4
Chang Yu-lung	Chinese Taipei	2	0	2	3
Ko Pin-yi	Chinese Taipei	1	0	1	2
**Fedor Gorst**	United States	1	0	1	2
Lee Vann Corteza	Philippines	1	0	1	2
Thorsten Hohmann	Germany	1	0	1	2
Albin Ouschan	Austria	1	0	1	1
Chris Melling	United Kingdom	1	0	1	1
Dennis Orcollo	Philippines	1	0	1	1
**Wojciech Szewczyk**	Poland	1	0	1	1

- Active participants are shown in **bold**.
- In the event of identical records, players are sorted in alphabetical order by first name.

=== Women ===
Year	Location	Winner	Score	Finalist	Semi-finalists
2009	(China) Shanghai	(Chinese Taipei) Tsai Pei-chun	9-5	(Republic of Ireland) Karen Corr	(United Kingdom) Kelly Fisher
2009	(China) Shanghai	(Chinese Taipei) Tsai Pei-chun	9-5	(Republic of Ireland) Karen Corr	(China) Fu Xiaofang
2010	(China) Shanghai	(China) Chen Siming	9-7	(United Kingdom) Allison Fisher	(Republic of Ireland) Karen Corr
2010	(China) Shanghai	(China) Chen Siming	9-7	(United Kingdom) Allison Fisher	(Chinese Taipei) Lin Yuan-chun
2011	(China) Shanghai	(China) Fu Xiaofang	9–3	(China) Chen Siming	(Chinese Taipei) Lim Yun-mi
2011	(China) Shanghai	(China) Fu Xiaofang	9–3	(China) Chen Siming	(Austria) Jasmin Ouschan
2012	(China) Shanghai	(United Kingdom) Kelly Fisher	9–2	(China) Zhou Doudou	(China) Fu Xiaofang
2012	(China) Shanghai	(United Kingdom) Kelly Fisher	9–2	(China) Zhou Doudou	(China) Chen Siming
2013	(China) Shanghai	(China) Liu Shasha	9–8	(China) Chen Siming	(United Kingdom) Allison Fisher
2013	(China) Shanghai	(China) Liu Shasha	9–8	(China) Chen Siming	(United Kingdom) Kelly Fisher
2014	(China) Shanghai	(China) Han Yu	9–5	(South Korea) Kim Ga-young	(China) Liu Shasha
2014	(China) Shanghai	(China) Han Yu	9–5	(South Korea) Kim Ga-young	(China) Chen Siming
2015	(China) Shanghai	(South Korea) Kim Ga-young	9–6	(China) Fu Xiaofang	(China) Han Yu
2015	(China) Shanghai	(South Korea) Kim Ga-young	9–6	(China) Fu Xiaofang	(China) Chen Siming
2016	(China) Shanghai	(China) Han Yu (2)	9–8	(China) Liu Shasha	(China) Wang Xiaotong
2016	(China) Shanghai	(China) Han Yu (2)	9–8	(China) Liu Shasha	(China) Xue Chen
2017	(China) Shanghai	(China) Chen Siming (2)	9–8	(China) Liu Shasha	(Philippines) Chezka Centeno
2017	(China) Shanghai	(China) Chen Siming (2)	9–8	(China) Liu Shasha	(China) Fu Xiaofang
2018	(China) Shanghai	(China) Fu Xiaofang (2)	9–1	(United Kingdom) Kelly Fisher	(South Korea) Kim Ga-young
2018	(China) Shanghai	(China) Fu Xiaofang (2)	9–1	(United Kingdom) Kelly Fisher	(China) Liu Shasha
2019	(China) Shanghai	(China) Chen Siming (3)	9–3	(Philippines) Rubilen Amit	(China) Liu Shasha
2019	(China) Shanghai	(China) Chen Siming (3)	9–3	(Philippines) Rubilen Amit	(China) Han Yu
2023	(China) Shanghai	(China) Han Yu (3)	9–7	(China) Liu Shasha	(Chinese Taipei) Chia Hua Chen
2023	(China) Shanghai	(China) Han Yu (3)	9–7	(China) Liu Shasha	(Germany) Pia Filler
2024	(China) Shanghai	(China) Han Yu (4)	9–8	(China) Wang Xiaotong	(Philippines) Rubilen Amit
2024	(China) Shanghai	(China) Han Yu (4)	9–8	(China) Wang Xiaotong	(Chinese Taipei) Chou Chieh-Yu
2025	(China) Shanghai	(Japan) Chihiro Kawahara	9–7	(China) Liu Shasha	(China) Fu Xiaofang
2025	(China) Shanghai	(Japan) Chihiro Kawahara	9–7	(China) Liu Shasha	(Austria) Jasmin Ouschan
2026	(China) Shanghai	(China) Liu Shasha	9–5	(China) Fu Xiaofang	(Philippines) Rubilen Amit
2026	(China) Shanghai	(China) Liu Shasha	9–5	(China) Fu Xiaofang	(China) Shi Tianqi (2)

==== Top performers ====
Name	Nationality	Winner	Runner-up	Finals	Semi-final or better
**Han Yu**	China	4	0	4	6
**Chen Siming**	China	3	2	5	8
**Liu Shasha**	China	2	4	6	9
**Fu Xiaofang**	China	2	1	3	7
Kelly Fisher	United Kingdom	1	1	2	4
Kim Ga-young	South Korea	1	1	2	3
Tsai Pei-chun	Chinese Taipei	1	0	1	1
Chihiro Kawahara	Japan	1	0	1	1

- Active participants are shown in **bold**.
- In the event of identical records, players are sorted in alphabetical order by first name.
