= Julie Kelly =

Irish pool and snooker player

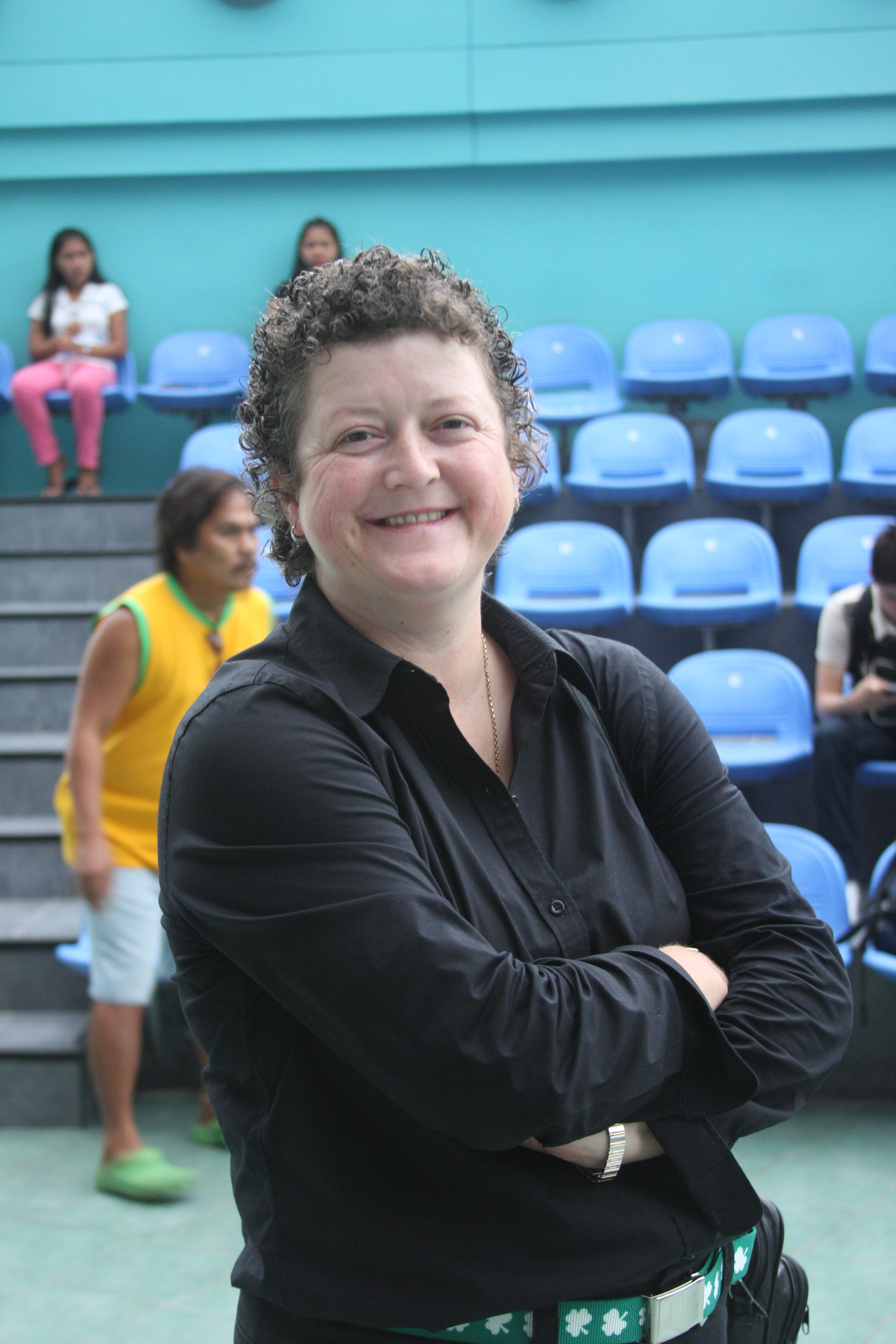

Personal information
- Nickname: Motor Molly
- Born: 28 January 1968 (age 58) Dublin, Ireland

Sport
- Country: Ireland
- Sport: Snooker

Tournament wins
- World Championship: Nine-ball (2000)

Julie Kelly (born 28 January 1968) is an Irish professional pool and former snooker player. She won the WPA nine-ball world championship in 2000.

== Biography ==
Kelly was a sheepherder in Ireland and won the Irish women's snooker championship a record seven times before travelling to the United States with her friend Karen Corr to take up pool. Kelly sold her sheep to help finance the move.

Kelly won the 2000 WPA Women's World Nine-ball Championship in Quebec City, Canada. She twice defeated defending champion Liu Shin-mei, by scores of 9–8 and 9–6, and beat Jeanette Lee 9–7 before defeating Karen Corr 9–8 in the final.

As of 2003, Kelly was living in northeastern Pennsylvania and training with former professional pool player Peter Fusco.

In October 2004, Kelly won her first WPBA title, at the Canadian Classic in Windsor, Ontario. After losing to Corr in the fourth round, she progressed through the losers' bracket and defeated Corr 7–4 in the semi-final. She then beat Allison Fisher 7–5 in the final.

== Titles and achievements ==
Snooker

- 1991, 1992, 1993, 1995, 1996, 1997, 1998 Republic of Ireland Ladies' Snooker Association Champion

Pool

- 2000 WPA Nine-ball World Championship
- 2000 New York State Championship
- 2000 PP Tour 2000 #12 Women's Division
- 2004 WPBA Canadian Classic
