= Cue sports at the 2010 Asian Games – Women's six-red snooker singles =

Women's six-red snooker singles at the 2010 Asian Games
- Venue: Asian Games Town Gymnasium
- Dates: 15–16 November 2010
- Competitors: 18 from 9 nations

Medalists
gold medal	Chen Siming	China
silver medal	Lai Hui-shan	Chinese Taipei
bronze medal	Ng On Yee	Hong Kong
bronze medal	Bi Zhuqing	China

The women's six-red snooker singles tournament at the 2010 Asian Games in Guangzhou took place from 15 November to 16 November at the Asian Games Town Gymnasium.

== Schedule ==
All times are China Standard Time (UTC+08:00)

Date	Time	Event
Monday, 15 November 2010	10:00	Preliminary
Monday, 15 November 2010	13:00	Last 16
Monday, 15 November 2010	20:00	Quarterfinals
Tuesday, 16 November 2010	10:00	Semifinals
Tuesday, 16 November 2010	16:00	Final

== Results ==
=== Final ===
Final
1	Chen Siming (CHN)	4
	Lai Hui-shan (TPE)	0

=== Top half ===
Preliminary
Vidya Pillai (IND)	4
Đoàn Thị Ngọc Lệ (VIE)	0

Last 16
1	Chen Siming (CHN)	4
Vidya Pillai (IND)	1
Chan Ya-ting (TPE)	4
Floriza Andal (PHI)	0
Charlene Chai (SIN)	3
Lim Yun-mi (KOR)	4
Maliwan Sangklar (THA)	0
4	Ng On Yee (HKG)	4

Quarterfinals
1	Chen Siming (CHN)	4
Chan Ya-ting (TPE)	1
Lim Yun-mi (KOR)	1
4	Ng On Yee (HKG)	4

Semifinals
1	Chen Siming (CHN)	4
4	Ng On Yee (HKG)	3

=== Bottom half ===
Preliminary
Amy Hoe (SIN)	4
Dương Thúy Vi (VIE)	2

Last 16
3	Nicha Pathomekmongkhon (THA)	1
So Man Yan (HKG)	4
Lai Hui-shan (TPE)	4
Chitra Magimairaj (IND)	1
Cha Bo-ram (KOR)	4
Mary Ann Basas (PHI)	3
Amy Hoe (SIN)	1
2	Bi Zhuqing (CHN)	4

Quarterfinals
So Man Yan (HKG)	2
Lai Hui-shan (TPE)	4
Cha Bo-ram (KOR)	1
2	Bi Zhuqing (CHN)	4

Semifinals
Lai Hui-shan (TPE)	4
2	Bi Zhuqing (CHN)	0
