= Ewa Laurance =

Swedish-American pool player

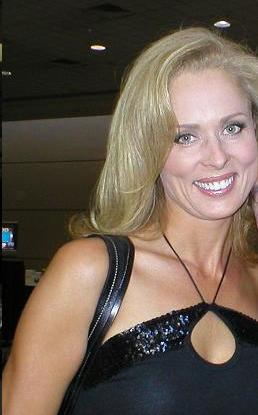
- Laurence in 2007

Personal information
- Born: 26 February 1964 (age 62) Gävle, Sweden
- Website: www.strikingviking.com

Pool career
- Country: Sweden
- Pool games: 9-Ball

Tournament wins
- World Champion: 9-Ball (1994)

Ewa Laurance (former surnames Svensson and Mataya Laurance, born February 26, 1964) is a Swedish professional pool player, most notably on the Women's Professional Billiard Association nine-ball tour, a sports writer, and more recently a sports commentator for ESPN. In 2004, she was inducted into the Billiard Congress of America's Hall of Fame. She has been nicknamed "the Leading Lady of Billiards" and "the Striking Viking".

== Playing career ==
Laurance has been playing pool since she was four years old. She moved to the United States in 1981 at 17 years old, after competing in the 1980 WPBA World Straight Pool Championship in New York City. In 1983, she became the first female European player to win a professional pool event in the United States, winning the Clyde Childress 9-Ball Open.

Laurance has won numerous major women's pool titles, including the WPA World Nine-ball Championship, WPBA U.S. Open 9-Ball Championship, WPBA National Championship, International Trick Shot Challenge and the European Pool Championship 14.1.

In 2005, Laurance bested three of her peers, WPBA Tour members Allison Fisher, Dawn Hopkins, and Gerda Hofstatter, at the Women's Trick Shot Challenge held at the New York Hotel Casino in Las Vegas, Nevada, pocketing US$25,000 as the grand prize. Animated and expressive, she played to the audience and the cameras, "a true showperson in her element and a wonderful example to all trick shot artists."

== Television ==
She was the co-host of the GSN original game show Ballbreakers. She has hosted the Ultimate Pool Party on ESPN. She has also been a model, appearing in TV commercials for No Nonsense brand pantyhose, and appeared on National Bingo Night on June 1, 2007. She frequently acts as a color commentator on ESPN telecasts of nine-ball tournaments, usually along with her husband Mitchell Laurance. She has recently been featured on commercials featuring Dick's Pawn Shop in Myrtle Beach, SC.

== Writing ==
She has authored three books: The Ewa Mataya Pool Guide (paperback, ISBN 9780380776450), The Complete Idiot's Guide to Pool & Billiards (paperback, ISBN 9781592572878), and Quick Start Guide to Pocket Billiards (paperback, ISBN 9780071415200). She has also written monthly columns for Pool & Billiard magazine.

== Personal life ==
In 1982, she married the professional pool player Jimmy Mataya, forming pool's first "power couple". They later divorced, with Ewa retaining the surname Mataya, as she was already professionally well known by this name. They have a daughter, Nikki, born in 1985.

In 1994, she married actor Mitch Laurance, later also pool commentator for ESPN and twin brother of actor Matthew Laurance.

== Titles and achievements ==
- 1981 European Pool Championship 14.1
- 1983 Clyde Childress 9-Ball Open
- 1984 Clyde Childress 9-Ball Open
- 1984 Midwest 9-Ball Open
- 1984 Milwaukee Doubles Cup
- 1985 Michigan 9-Ball Open
- 1985 Midwest 9-Ball Open
- 1987 Brunswick 9-Ball Team Challenge - with (Mike Sigel)
- 1988 WPBA U.S. Open 9-Ball Championship
- 1990 Cleveland Spring Open
- 1990 East Coast 9-Ball Classic
- 1990 Sands Regency 9-Ball Open
- 1990 Cleveland Fall Open
- 1990 Rocket City Invitational
- 1990 Billiards Digest Player of the Year
- 1991 WPBA U.S. Open 9-Ball Championship
- 1991 WPBA National Championship
- 1994 WPA World 9-Ball Championship
- 1995 WPBA Houston Classic
- 1998 WPBA Brunswick Boston Classic
- 2004 Billiard Congress of America Hall of Fame
- 2005 International Trick Shot Challenge
- 2007 World Cup of Trick Shots
- 2008 WPBA Hall of Fame
- 2012 WPBA Masters
