= Mitchell Laurance =

Actor, Broadcaster

- Born: March 2, 1950 (age 76); Queens, New York City, New York, US
- Notable work: Not Necessarily the News, Matlock, Dawson's Creek
- Spouse: Ewa Laurance

Comedy career
- Years active: 1980–present
- Medium: Actor, Sports Commentator, Podcast Host

Mitchell Laurance is an American film and television actor and sports broadcaster.

== Early life, family and education ==
Mitchell was born in Queens, New York City, New York and raised in Hewlett, New York. He has an identical twin brother, Matthew (born four minutes later), who is also a professional actor.

Both brothers are graduates of Tufts University.

== Career ==
Mitchell and his identical twin brother Matthew appear occasionally together, beginning when they were children in a margarine TV commercial which featured identical twins, and later in an episode of the TV series Cop Rock. Although Matthew was a performer on Saturday Night Live for its sixth season, Mitchell also appeared in uncredited roles on the show for a few seasons (1977–80) and was an associate director and producer for the show.

In 1989, Mitchell was in an AT&T commercial in which he played a man in a phone booth trying to dial Phoenix and was instead repeatedly getting Fiji. In the same year, Mitchell hosted a unsold pilot for a U.S. version of the long-running British game show Mastermind, announced by Charlie O'Donnell and was produced by A Mac III Production. The pilot was taped on August 19, 1989.

Mitchell appeared on Not Necessarily the News during the 1980s. Other recurring roles included the short-lived series Roxie (1987; most of the episodes were unaired), L.A. Law (1987−88), Reasonable Doubts (1992–93), Matlock (1988−95), and Dawson's Creek. Guest roles have ranged from Laverne & Shirley, CHiPs, The Outer Limits, One Tree Hill, Night Court, Prison Break, MacGyver, Beauty and the Beast, Midnight Caller, Empty Nest, and Jake and the Fatman. He was in the "Apollo One" episode of the mini-series From the Earth to the Moon (1998). In the early 1990s he performed the role of Ben Arnold on the soap opera Santa Barbara.

He also has acted in feature films such as Stepfather II, The Runestone, The Hand That Rocks the Cradle, and Urban Mythology, and TV movies (especially in the 1990s) including The Almost Perfect Bank Robbery; Perfect Crime; To Love, Honor and Deceive; Kiss and Tell; Deadly Pursuits; Inflammable; and Death in Small Doses .

Mitch has been a sports talk show host, at WFMZ, a sports radio station in Charlotte, North Carolina, and for 20 years was the lead Play-by-Play commentator for ESPN Billiards. He was the Play-by-Play Commentator for the Mid-Atlantic Golf Championship, and for 20 years hosted On The Green, the 24-hour TV channel of Myrtle Beach, SC golf. He has also hosted over 450 golf-related podcasts, from Hooked on Hickories to Golf Connections with Mitch Laurance and currently Talking GolfGetaways (200 episodes) on all podcast platforms.

== Personal life ==
Laurance is married to Ewa Laurance (née Svensson; formerly known as Ewa Mataya), a billiards world champion (a member of the Billiard Congress of America Hall of Fame) and model. They reside in Myrtle Beach, South Carolina

A golf enthusiast, he played in numerous celebrity and pro-am golf tournaments for more than 30 years.
