= Nine-ball at the 2013 World Games – women's singles =

Nine-ball women's singles at the 2013 World Games
- Venue: Unidad Deportiva Alberto Galindo, Cali, Colombia
- Dates: 26–30 July 2013
- Competitors: 16 from 15 nations

Medalists
gold medal	(Chinese Taipei) Chou Chieh-yu
silver medal	(South Korea) Kim Ga-young
bronze medal	(United Kingdom) Kelly Fisher

The women's singles nine-ball competition at the 2013 World Games took place from 26 to 30 July at the Unidad Deportiva Alberto Galindo in Cali, Colombia.

== Last 16 ==
Kelly Fisher (United Kingdom)	9–1	(Colombia) Andrea Lisette Cardona Anacona
Akimi Kajatani (Japan)	7–9	(Norway) Line Kjörsvik
Jasmin Ouschan (Austria)	9–1	(Germany) Jasmin Michel
Chou Chieh-yu (Chinese Taipei)	9–2	(Venezuela) Mirjana Grujicic
Kim Ga-young (South Korea)	9–3	(United States) Jeanette Lee
Caroline Roos (Sweden)	5–9	(Russia) Nataliya Seroshtan
Monica Webb (United States)	9–2	(South Africa) Nicola Rossouw
Siming Chen (China)	9–0	(Nicaragua) Karen Yamileth Garcia Gallegos

== Last 8 ==
Quarter-finals
(United Kingdom) Kelly Fisher	9
(Norway) Line Kjörsvik	1
(Austria) Jasmin Ouschan	6
(Chinese Taipei) Chou Chieh-yu	9
(South Korea) Kim Ga-young	9
(Russia) Nataliya Seroshtan	4
(United States) Monica Webb	4
(China) Siming Chen	9

Semi-finals
(United Kingdom) Kelly Fisher	4
(Chinese Taipei) Chou Chieh-yu	9
(South Korea) Kim Ga-young	9
(China) Siming Chen	8

Gold medal match
(Chinese Taipei) Chou Chieh-yu	9
(South Korea) Kim Ga-young	8
Bronze medal match
(United Kingdom) Kelly Fisher	9
(China) Siming Chen	6
