= Franziska Stark =

German pool player (born 1961)

Franziska Stark (born 4 July 1961) is a German pool player.

A winner of 24 Individual German Championships (7 in 8-Ball, 5 in 9-Ball and 12 in 14.1), she has also had considerable international success. Her career highlight so far has been winning the WPA 9-Ball Women's World Championship 1992 final against the American Vivian Villarreal. In 1998, she made it to the finals again, but was beaten by the Englishwoman Allison Fisher.

Franziska reached 23 European Championship finals between 1986 and 2000, winning 11 of them. She was a member of the losing Europe team at the first Mosconi Cup in 1994, when it was compulsory to have two women in each team.

== Titles ==
- 1986 European Pool Championship Straight Pool
- 1988 European Pool Championship 9-ball
- 1989 European Pool Championship 9-ball
- 1990 European Pool Championship 9-ball
- 1992 European Pool Championship 9-ball
- 1993 European Pool Championship Straight Pool
- 1994 European Pool Championship 9-ball
- 1996 European Pool Championship 8-ball
- 1999 European Pool Championship Straight Pool
- 1999 European Pool Championship 8-ball
- 2000 European Pool Championship 8-ball
