= 2018 WPA World Nine-ball Junior Championship =

World Junior pool championship, held October 2018

2017 WPA World Nine-ball Juniors Championship
Tournament information
- Dates: 31 October 2017–3 November 2017
- City: Moscow
- Country: Russia
- Organisation: WPA
- Format: double elimination, single elimination

Final
- Champion: Mahkeal Parris (U17); Yip Kin Ling (boys); Chen Chia-hua (girls)

The 2018 WPA World Junior Nine-ball Championships was the 27th hosting of the Junior World Championship in the pool discipline 9-Ball. The event ran from 31 October to 3 November 2018 Moscow, Russia.

Under 19 world champion was Yip Kin Ling from Hong Kong. In the final against his countryman Robbie Capito he won 11–10 against last year's finalist. In the Under 17 age group was won by Mahkeal Parris who won the final against the Norwegian Emil Andre Gangfløt 9–6. In the junior women, Chen Chia-hua won the event, winning 9–5 victory against the South Korean Seo Seoa in the final.

Defending champion were Sanjin Pehlivanović (U17), Fedor Gorst (U19) and Kristina Tkatsch (Junior). Gorst was the only champion to attempt to defend their title. While Pehlivanović now played in the Under 19 category, Tkatsch was due to age no longer eligible.

== Winners ==
Wettbewerb	Gold	Silber	Bronze
U17-Junioren	(United States) Mahkeal Parris	(Norway) Emil Andre Gangfløt	(Slovakia) Kristián Mrva
U17-Junioren	(United States) Mahkeal Parris	(Norway) Emil Andre Gangfløt	(Denmark) Christoffer Lentz
U19-Junioren	(Hong Kong) Yip Kin Ling	(Hong Kong) Robbie Capito	(Germany) Christian Fröhlich
U19-Junioren	(Hong Kong) Yip Kin Ling	(Hong Kong) Robbie Capito	(Poland) Wiktor Zieliński
U19-Juniorinnen	(Chinese Taipei) Chen Chia-hua	(South Korea) Seo Seoa	(United States) April Larson
U19-Juniorinnen	(Chinese Taipei) Chen Chia-hua	(South Korea) Seo Seoa	(Sweden) My Nguyen

== Tournament format ==
All three competitions were first held in the Double-elimination tournament with a Single-elimination tournament from the quarter-finals onwards. The events were all played as winner breaks.

== Under 17 Junior ==
Quarterfinals
1	(Denmark) Christoffer Lentz	9
8	(Germany) Dennis Laszkowski	8
4	(Norway) Emil Andre Gangfløt	9
5	(Russia) Artem Lukin	6
2	(Netherlands) Quinten Pongers	6
7	(Slovakia) Kristián Mrva	9
3	(United States) Austin Summers	7
6	(United States) Mahkeal Parris	9

Semifinals
(Denmark) Christoffer Lentz	7
(Norway) Emil Andre Gangfløt	9
(Slovakia) Kristián Mrva	7
(United States) Mahkeal Parris	9

Finals
(Norway) Emil Andre Gangfløt	6
(United States) Mahkeal Parris	9

== Under 19 Men's ==
Quarterfinals
1	(Poland) Wiktor Zieliński	11
8	(Costa Rica) Andrés Aguilar	3
4	(Hong Kong) Robbie Capito	11
5	(Chinese Taipei) Wu Shi-hao	4
2	(Hong Kong) Yip Kin Ling	11
7	(Russia) Wladimir Matwijenko	7
3	(Germany) Christian Fröhlich	11
6	(Russia) Fedor Gorst	10

Semifinals
(Poland) Wiktor Zieliński	10
(Hong Kong) Robbie Capito	11
(Hong Kong) Yip Kin Ling	11
(Germany) Christian Fröhlich	6

Finals
(Hong Kong) Robbie Capito	10
(Hong Kong) Yip Kin Ling	11

== Under 19 women's ==
Semifinals
1	(Sweden) My Nguyen	4
4	(South Korea) Seo Seoa	9
3	(Chinese Taipei) Chen Chia-hua	9
2	(United States) April Larson	4

Finals
(South Korea) Seo Seoa	5
(Chinese Taipei) Chen Chia-hua	9
