= Gerda Hofstätter =

Austrian pool player, former world champion, born 1979

Personal information
- Nickname: G-Force
- Born: 9 February 1971 (age 55) Friesach, Austria

Pool career
- Country: Austria

Tournament wins
- World Champion: Nine-ball (1995)

Gerda Hofstätter Gergerson (born 9 February 1971), nicknamed "G-Force", is an Austrian professional pool player. Hofstätter won the WPA World Nine-ball Championship in 1995. She is a winner at the European Pool Championship on nine occasions, and won the Austrian national Championship seventeen times. Hofstätter is a two-time Hall of Fame inductee being voted into both the Women's Professional Billiard Association and Billiard Congress of America Hall of Fames in the Greatest Players Category. Hofstätter was the Austrian Sportswoman of the Year for Carinthia in 1993. Hofstätter played on the WPBA Tour until her retirement, doing so from 1993 onward.

== Career ==
=== Early life ===
Hofstätter was born on 9 February 1971 in Friesach, Austria. Before pool, Hofstätter played several different sports, including tennis, skiing, and fencing. Before the age of 18, Hofstätter won the Austrian fencing championship, as well as an international fencing competition. Hofstätter decided to take up pool at 15, when she joined a team in Althofen. In 1987, she won her first Austrian national championship. In 1989, Hofstätter recorded Austria's first-ever win at the European Pool Championships, with victory in the 8-ball event. After winning the event, Hofstätter was given a "key to the city" of Althofen.

In 1990, Hofstätter moved to Sweden where she was the highest ranked player for two consecutive seasons, before moving to the United States in 1993 to compete in the Women's Pool Billiard Association (WPBA) Classic Tour. Hofstätter won the first WPBA event she competed in, the Creative Inventions San Francisco Classic. She would also win her second and third European championships in 1993 in the eight-ball and nine-ball events. She was also voted the Austrian player of the year for the state of Carinthia that year.

=== Professional career ===
She entered the Women's WPA World Nine-ball Championship in 1995, held in Taipei, Taiwan. She reached the final and defeated Vivian Villarreal to win her first world championship. She also won her fourth European championship, in the nine-ball event that year. A few years later, Hofstätter would reach the semi-final of the WPBA Hawaii Classic in 1998. The following year, Hofstätter finished third at the U.S. Open Nine-ball Championship. The 2000 season saw Hofstätter reach the knockout rounds again at the world Nine-ball championship, reaching the last 16, and seventh at the Women's event at the U.S. Open. Hofstätter would win her first tournament this season since her world championship win, where she won the BCA Open Nine-ball Championship. 2001 saw Hofstätter finish in the top five at two WPBA events, at the players championship, and Midwest championship.

In 2002, Hofstätter reached the semi-finals of the world Nine-ball championship again. She would also finish as runner-up at two tournaments, at the Amway World Open, and the Midwest Classic, losing to Allison Fisher in both finals. In 2003, her highest finish was seventh place, doing so in four events, including the U.S. Open. In 2004, Hofstätter participated on the new Japan Tour (known as JPNEW), where she would win event five. She would also reach the final of the national nine-ball championship, defeating Kelly Fisher, and Allison Fisher before losing the final to Karen Corr. Hofstätter would go on to reach the final at the WPBA West Coast Classic in 2005, losing to Kelly Fisher in the final.

Since 2006, she played almost exclusively on the WPBA Tour, as well as two International Pool Tour events in 2006. Hoffstatter won an event in 2010, at the WPBA San Diego Classic defeating Chang Shu-Han 7–3 in the final. In 2018, Hofstätter was inducted into both the Women's Professional Billiard Association and Billiard Congress of America Hall of Fames in the Greatest Players Category. As of 2019, she is now retired from playing. In total, she is a 9-time European champion, and 17-time Austrian national champion.

== Personal life ==
Hofstätter is married to Dan with two children Sophie and Madison. She has a Bachelor of Science in Business from New York University. She is also a qualified pilot. When playing, she was given the nickname of "g-force".

== Titles & achievements ==
- 2010 WPBA Tour San Diego Classic
- 2009 European Pool Championships Straight pool
- 2001 European Pool Championships Eight-ball
- 2000 WPBA Tour BCA Open Nine-ball Championship
- 1997 WPBA Tour Brunswick 9-Ball Championship
- 1997 European Pool Championships Eight-ball
- 1997 European Pool Championships Straight pool
- 1996 WPBA Tour Gordan's 9-Ball Championship
- 1996 WPBA Tour Seattle Classic
- 1996 WPBA Tour Austin Classic
- 1996 WPBA Tour Huebler Classic
- 1995 WPA Women's World Nine-ball Championship
- 1995 European Pool Championships Nine-ball
- 1995 European Pool Championships Straight pool
- 1994 WPBA Tour Orlando Classic
- 1993 European Pool Championships Eight-ball
- 1993 European Pool Championships Nine-ball
- 1993 WPBA Tour Atlanta Classic
- 1993 McDermott Nine-Ball Tour
- 1989 European Pool Championships Eight-ball
