= Vivian Villarreal =

American pool player, born January 1965

Personal information
- Nickname: The Texas Tornado
- Born: 30 January 1965 (age 61) San Antonio, Texas, U.S.

Pool career
- Country: United States
- Turned pro: 1987
- Pool games: 8-Ball, Nine-Ball, Ten-ball
- Highest rank: 1

Vivian Villarreal (born 30 January 1965) is an American former professional pool player. She was the World Pool-Billiard Association world number one women's player for five years, and has twice been runner up in the WPA World Nine-ball Championship.

== Career ==
Villarreal's grandmother, Amalia Huerta, was the owner of Mollie's Lounge, a restaurant and bar with a pool table, in San Antonio. Villarreal sometimes helped with cleaning and became interested in pool. She started to play at the age of 8, and by the time she was 11, had accumulated 161 trophies.

She gave up playing pool for about 10 years from the age of 14 to focus on her studies. Villarreal graduated from Lee High School, and went on to study computer science, book-keeping and accounting at San Antonio College.

Villarreal started playing again, and participated in the Women's Professional Billiard Association circuit in 1992, winning her first title at the Wahine Open in Hilo, Hawaii her first year. She won several more titles over the following years and in 1996 won the ESPN World Open 9-Ball Championship.

In 1992, she was runner-up in WPA World Nine-ball championship, losing to Franziska Stark, and in 1996 was beaten in the final of the competition by Gerda Hofstatter.

She is known as "The Texas Tornado" for her rapid and demonstrative style of play.

The Women's Professional Billiard Association inducted Villarreal to its Hall of Fame in 2015.

== Personal life and charitable work ==
She adopted a child in 1992, but the child was taken away by her biological mother in 1997 following a court-approved visitation. Villarreal spent some eight years searching for the child, who was finally discovered to be in Arkansas. Villarreal subsequently agreed that the child could choose where to stay, and the child continued to live with her biological mother whilst maintaining contact with Villarreal.

Villareal is the founder of The Tornado Foundation, which has a broad mission to help "any child, animal or victim in need of assistance" and organises a pool event called The Tornado Open to benefit the Foundation.

== Titles & Achievements ==
- 1988 McDermott 8-Ball Championship
- 1990 Summertime Classic 9-Ball
- 1991 Wahine Classic 9-Ball
- 1991 Alamo City 9-Ball Open
- 1992 International 9-Ball Classic
- 1992 McDermont 9-Ball Championship
- 1992 WPBA National Championship
- 1993 Kasson Chicago Classic
- 1992 Champs Billiards 9-Ball Open
- 1992 Rum Runner 9-Ball Open
- 1993 McDermott National 9-Ball Tour
- 1993 WPA World Tour Championship
- 1993 Bicycle Club 9-Ball Classic
- 1994 WPBA Baltimore Classic
- 1994 San Antonio Rose 9-Ball Open
- 1994 Huebler Cues Seattle Classic
- 1994 Cuetec Cues Charlotte Classic
- 1994 Viking Cues Milwaukee Classic
- 1994 McDermontt Heritage Classic
- 1994 Connelly Billiards Denver Classic
- 1994 Mosconi Cup
- 1995 Viking Cues Charlotte Classic
- 1996 ESPN Open 9-Ball Championship
- 1996 Connelly Players Classic 9-Ball
- 1996 WPBA Detroit Classic
- 1996 Gordon's Boston 9-Ball
- 1998 Brunswick Billiards New York Classic
- 2000 Texas 9-Ball Open
- 2001 Houston 9-ball Open
- 2002 Florida 9-Ball Open
- 2003 Texas Open 9-Ball Championship
- 2003 Fast Eddie's Tour
- 2005 Ladies Spirit Tour
- 2010 Fast Eddie's Tour
- 2011 CSI US Bar Table 8-Ball Championship
- 2011 CSI US Bar Table 9-Ball Championship
- 2011 CSI US Bar Table 10-Ball Championship
- 2011 CSI US Bar Table All-Around Title
- 2012 Texas Open 9-Ball Championship
- 2012 Space City 9-Ball Championship
- 2013 Texas Open 9-Ball Championship
- 2013 Big Tyme Classic 9-Ball
- 2013 CSI US Bar Table All-Around Title
- 2014 Texas Open 9-Ball Championship
- 2014 Big Tyme Classic 9-Ball
- 2014 Texas Tornado Championship
- 2014 Houston 9-Ball Open
- 2015 WPBA Hall of Fame
- 2015 Chinook Winds Open 8-Ball
- 2015 Texas Open 9-Ball Championship
- 2015 Big Tyme Classic 9-Ball
- 2017 Texas Open 9-Ball Championship
- 2018 WPBA Signature Tour Stop
- 2018 Ashton Twins Classic
- 2025 Texas Billiards Hall of Fame
