= Robin Bell Dodson =

Billiards player

Personal information
- Born: Robin Hansen; May 30, 1956 (age 69) Omaha, Nebraska, U.S.
- Occupation: Billiards player
- Years active: 1968–1998
- Spouse(s): Joe Bell (divorced) Roy Dodson (m. 1995)
- Children: 6, including Drake Bell
- Relative: Heath Bell (nephew)

Robin Bell Dodson (née Hansen; born May 30, 1956) is an American former professional billiards player.

== Early life and career ==
Dodson was born on May 30, 1956, in Omaha, Nebraska as Robin Hansen. Her father, Roderick Wayne Hansen, a commercial baker, played pool and gambled. When Dodson was three years old, her parents separated and her mother, Helen Hansen, settled in Westminster, California, alongside her two sisters. Her mother worked two factory jobs, only coming home to make dinner. The family lived in an orphanage. Dodson started playing pinball and learned to play billiards when she was 12. By the time she was 13, she would hitchhike to pool halls at night. Dodson dropped out of Westminster High School during her freshman year. She won the California Women's State Championship at the age of 16 and continued to win for the next two consecutive years. During this time, Dodson suffered from drug addiction, having smoked marijuana and taking various depressants, PCP, and LSD. She later moved into her older sister's residence, which she described as a "hardcore heroin environment". Dodson was arrested twice but never went to jail. In 1977, she and her firstborn son moved into the Harvest House, a Christian homeless shelter in Santa Ana, California. After a long break, she began to play again in 1984. Between 1984 and 1998, Dodson won various major tournaments, including the National Championships and the WPA World 9-Ball Championships. She was inducted into the BCA Hall of Fame in 2005.

== Personal life ==
Dodson is a born again Christian. She has struggled with drug addiction, including heroin. Dodson received her GED in 2001.

Dodson has six children, including actor and musician Drake Bell. She was married to Joe Bell, who worked as a swimming pool service technician whom she later divorced. Her second and current husband is Roy Dodson whom she married on July 30, 1995.

== Select titles & achievements ==
- 1973 Southern California State 9-Ball
- 1974 California State 14.1 Championship
- 1990 B.C. Open 9-Ball Pro-Am Doubles
- 1990 WPA World Nine-ball Championship
- 1991 WPA World Nine-ball Championship
- 1992 WPBA U.S. Open 9-Ball Championship
- 1994 Gordan's Hotshot Championship
- 1995 WPBA Gordans 9-Ball Championship
- 1995 WPBA Kasson Atlanta Classic
- 1998 BCA Twin Cities Classic
- 2005 Billiard Congress of America Hall of Fame
- 2009 WPBA Hall of Fame
