= Zhou Doudou =

Chinese pool player

Personal information
- Nationality: Chinese
- Born: 1992 (age 33–34) Zhengzhou, Henan, China

Pool career
- Turned pro: 2009–present
- Best finish: 3rd place: Nine-ball (2019)

Zhoi Doudou is a Chinese professional pool player from Zhengzhou. A finalist at the 2012 China 9-Ball Open, finishing runner-up to Kelly Fisher. She finished as runner-up at the 2017 9-Ball International Open, losing to Liu Shasha. She reached the quarter-finals of the WPA Women's World Nine-ball Championship on three occasions, in 2011, 2014 and reached the semi-final at the 2019 event.
