= Bi Zhu Qing =

Chinese pool player

Personal information
- Born: 6 September 1988 (age 37)

Pool career
- Country: China
- Pool games: Nine-Ball, Ten-ball

Tournament wins
- World Champion: Nine-Ball (2011)

Bi Zhu Qing (born 6 September 1988) is a professional pool and snooker player from China. She is best known as the winner of the WPA Women's World Nine-ball Championship in 2011.

== Biography ==
Bi started playing snooker in 2005, taking up pool three years later, and was a member of Chinese government supported training programmes designed to manufacture winners.

At her first world championship in 2010, Bi was ranked 81st in the world and had no notable pool tournament wins, so her victory, including a 9–7 defeat of Chen Siming in the final, was a surprising result.

== Tournament results ==
- 2011 WPA Women's World Nine-ball Championship
- 2007 IBSF World Under-21 Snooker Championship
- 2007 Asian Indoor Games – Women's Snooker Championship
