= Oliwia Zalewska =

Polish pool player (born 1995)

Personal information
- Born: 20 January 1995 (age 31)

Pool career
- Country: Poland
- Pool games: 9-Ball

Oliwia Zalewska née Czuprynska (born 20 January 1995) is a Polish professional pool player. Zalewska is a former WPA World Nine-ball junior champion, winning the ladies event in 2011. She also reached the final the following year, losing in the final to Diana Khodjaeva. She is also a three-time winner of Euro Tour events, winning the 2015 Treviso Open, 2019 Antalya Open and 2019 Klagenfurt Open. In addition, she has reached four finals, and won a total of seven medals at events on the tour.

== Titles & Achievements ==
- 2024 Polish Pool Championship 10-ball
- 2024 Polish Pool Championship 9-ball
- 2023 Euro Tour Estonian Open
- 2022 European Pool Championships 9-ball
- 2021 European Pool Championships 8-ball
- 2021 Euro Tour Antalya Open
- 2019 Euro Tour Klagenfurt Open
- 2019 Euro Tour Antalya Open
- 2015 Euro Tour Treviso Open
- 2013 European Pool Championship Straight Pool
- 2011 WPA World Nine-ball Junior Championship
