= WPBA Tour =

Professional women's pool tour

The Women's Professional Billiard Association Tour (known as the WPBA Tour) is a series of professional women's pool tournaments first held in 1992. Events on the tour are operated by the Women's Professional Billiard Association (WPBA). Events in the Tour feature the women's U.S. Open Nine-ball Championship, the WPBA Masters, and the WPBA Tour Championship. The series runs a world ranking format, based on the results of the prior six events.

The Tour followed the WPBA receding from the Professional Billiard Tour Association (PBTA) the year prior.
