= Tan Ho-yun =

Taiwanese pool player (born 1983)

Personal information
- Nationality: Taiwanese
- Born: 1983 (age 42–43)

Pool career
- Turned pro: 2007–present
- Best finish: Semi-finalist: WPA World Nine-ball Championship (2013, 2014)

Tan Ho-yun, born 19 February 1983 (also known as Chen Ho-yun) is a Taiwanese professional pool player. Tan is best known for her deep runs in world championship tournaments, including reaching the semi-finals of the WPA Women's World Nine-ball Championship in both the 2013 and 2014 events. Nicknamed the "Tornado Dragon", Tan won the 2023 Asian 9-ball Championship.

Chen won the Asian 9-Ball Championship in 2023. She defeated the reigning World Champion Chou Chieh-yu 7–6 in an all-Taiwanese final held in Taipei.
