= Lin Yuan-chun =

Pool player from Chinese Taipei

Personal information
- Nicknames: Woman Killer; Female Assassin
- Born: 5 October 1984 (age 41)

Pool career
- Country: Chinese Taipei
- Pool games: Eight-ball, Nine-Ball

Tournament wins
- World Champion: Nine-Ball (2008)

Lin Yuan-chun (born 5 October 1984) is a professional pool player from Chinese Taipei.

She started playing at the age of 17. At the 15th Asian Games in 2006, she won the 8 Ball Pool gold medal, narrowly winning 7–6 over Kim Ga-young.

Lin went on to win the WPA Women's World Nine-ball Championship in 2008, again by defeating Kim Ga-young in the final, and was runner-up to Han Yu in the final in 2013.

She has also won medals at the 2009 Asian Indoor Games, 2009 East Asian Games, 2009 World Games and 2010 Asian Games. She won the Amway World Open in 2008 and 2015.

== Titles ==
- 2006 Asian Games Eight-ball Singles
- 2006 All Japan Championship 9-Ball
- 2008 WPA Women's World Nine-ball Championship
- 2008 WPA Amway Cup 9-Ball World Open
