= Liu Shin-mei =

Pool player from Chinese Taipei

Personal information
- Nicknames: Billiards Queen; A-mei
- Born: 3 December 1969 (age 56)

Pool career
- Country: Chinese Taipei
- Pool games: Nine-Ball, 14.1 continuous

Tournament wins
- World Champion: Nine-Ball (1999, 2002)

Liu Shin-mei (柳信美) is a professional pool player from Chinese Taipei. She has won the WPA Women's World Nine-ball Championship twice, in 1999 and 2002.

== Biography ==
Both of Liu's parents were blind and worked as masseuses. As a young girl, Liu would bicycle to her parents' customers' houses. At 18, she started socialising at pool halls and took up playing pool. Later, she worked at a karaoke bar, during which she was regularly drinking and taking drugs, including amphetamines.

She studied at The Taipei Physical Education College. In 2001, she started studying sports management at Taipei Physical Education College, with the ambition of becoming a teacher.

She won the WPA Women's World Nine-ball Championship in 1999 and 2002, and was runner-up in 2004 and 2006. Shortly after winning the 2002 championship, she published an autobiographical book, Taiwan A-mei (台灣阿美).

== Tournament results ==
- 2004 WPA Amway Cup 9-Ball World Open
- 2003 All Japan Championship 9-Ball
- 2002 WPA Women's World Nine-ball Championship
- 2001 All Japan Championship 9-Ball
- 1999 WPA Women's World Nine-ball Championship
- 1998 All Japan Championship 9-Ball
- 1993 BCA U.S. Open Straight Pool Championship
