= Fu Xiaofang =

Chinese pool player (born 1986)

Personal information
- Born: 6 May 1986 (age 40)

Pool career
- Country: China
- Pool games: 8-Ball, 9-Ball

Tournament wins
- World Champion: Nine-Ball (2010); Heyball (2017)

Fu Xiaofang (born 6 May 1986) is a Chinese professional pool player. Fu is best known for winning the 2010 WPA World Nine-ball Championship.

== Biography ==
Fu was born into a peasant family in Bailou, in Lankao County, China. In 2002, aged 15, she travelled to her uncle's pool hall in Heilongjiang province to learn how to play pool. She moved to Beijing in 2004 to develop her game, and was coached by Zhang Shuchung. A year later, in 2005, she won her first national pool title.

Fu won bronze medals at the Asian Indoor Games in 2009 and at the Asian Games in 2010.

She won the 2010 WPA Women's World Nine-ball Championship with a 9–7 victory over Allison Fisher. Two years later, at the 2012 WPA Women's World Nine-ball Championship she was the runner-up, beaten in the final 6–9 by Kelly Fisher.

== Achievements ==
- 2010 WPA Women's World Nine-ball Championship
- 2011 China Open 9-Ball Championship
- 2014 WPA World Team Championship
- 2017 WPA WPA Heyball Championship
- 2018 China Open 9-Ball Championship
