= Chen Siming =

Chinese pool player (born 1993)

Personal information
- Born: 30 December 1993 (age 32)

Pool career
- Country: China
- Pool games: Eight-ball, nine-Ball, ten-ball

Tournament wins
- World Champion: Heyball (2016, 2019); Nine-ball (2017)
- Highest rank: 1

Chen Siming (born 30 December 1993) is a Chinese professional pool player. Chen is best known for winning the 2017 WPA World Nine-ball Championship.

== Career ==
Chen grew up in Heilongjiang Province, China, where her parents were owners of a pool hall, and she started playing snooker aged 8. Four years later, in 2006, she won both the 8-ball and 9-ball divisions of the Chinese National Youth Championships. By 2009 she was being coached by Wu Jia-qing (formerly known as Wu Chia-Ching), the double world champion. Within a year, she defeated Allison Fisher to win the 2010 China Open, her first major title.

In the 2010 Asian Games, Chen won the gold medal in the Six-red snooker event.

In 2011, she won her second senior title, the Philippine Open, defeating Kelly Fisher 9–3 in the final, and later won the All Japan Championship. Billiards Digest named Chen as 2011 player of the year after reaching the final of the 2011 WPA Women's World Nine-ball Championship.

Following further tournament successes, she won the 2017 WPA Women's World Nine-ball Championship, coming from 1–5 down against Pan Xiaoting to win 9–7.

== Titles & Achievements ==
- 2006 Chinese National Youth Championships Eight-ball
- 2006 Chinese National Youth Championships Nine-ball
- 2009 Asian Games Six-Red Snooker
- 2010 Asian Games Six-Red Snooker
- 2010 China Open 9-Ball Championship
- 2011 Philippine Open Ten-ball
- 2011 All Japan Championship Nine-ball
- 2011 Billiards Digest Player of the Year
- 2013 OB Cues Ladies Tour
- 2013 Maryland State Championship
- 2013 Queens Cup
- 2015 Queens Cup
- 2016 World Heyball Championship
- 2017 WPA Amway Cup 9-Ball Open
- 2017 China Open 9-Ball Championship
- 2017 All Japan Championship Nine-ball
- 2017 World Games Nine-ball Singles
- 2017 Asian Indoor and Martial Arts Games 10 Ball Singles
- 2017 WPA World Nine-ball Championship
- 2017 Dynamic Klagenfurt Open
- 2017 AZBilliards Player of the Year
- 2018 WPA Amway Cup 9-Ball Open
- 2019 WPBA Masters
- 2019 WPA World Heyball Championship
- 2019 AZBilliards Player of the Year
