= Kim Ga-young (pool player) =

South Korean female professional pool player (born 1983)

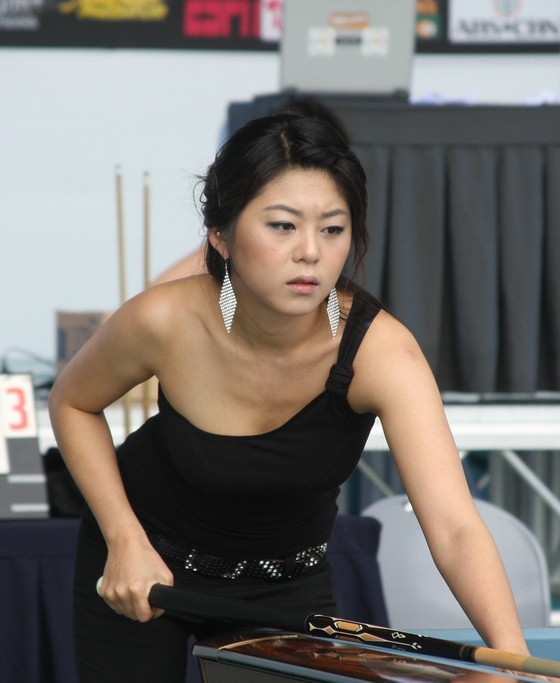

Personal information
- Nickname: Little Devil Girl
- Born: January 13, 1983 (age 43) Seoul, South Korea

Sport
- Country: South Korea
- Sport: Snooker
- Professional: 2003–present
Medal record
Representing South Korea
Women's eight-ball
Asian Games
Silver medal – second place	2006 Doha	Singles
Silver medal – second place	2010 Guangzhou	Singles
Women's nine-ball
World Games
Silver medal – second place	2013 Cali	Singles
Silver medal – second place	2017 Wrocław	Singles
Asian Indoor Games
Silver medal – second place	2007 Macau	Singles
Asian Indoor and Martial Arts Games
Bronze medal – third place	2013 Incheon	Singles
Bronze medal – third place	2017 Ashgabat	Singles
East Asian Games
Gold medal – first place	2009 Hong Kong	Singles

Kim Ga-young (Korean: 김가영) (born 13 January 1983 in Seoul; sometimes referred to in the Western media as Ga-young Kim and nicknamed "Little Devil Girl") is a South Korean female professional pool player who plays on the Women's Professional Billiard Association Tour. Her father began teaching her to play three-cushion billiards (a form of carom billiards) when she was about twelve years old. After playing three-cushion for about three years, she started playing nine-ball pool and turned pro at the 2003 BCA Open.

Kim practices about 30 hours a week and enjoys a friendly rivalry with fellow Asian WPBA player Pan Xiaoting of China. Kim and Pan met in the finals of the 2007 Carolina Women's Billiard Classic, with Kim prevailing 7–6 in the WPBA's first all-Asian championship match. Kim and Pan finished the 2007 WPBA season ranked 2nd and 3rd, respectively, behind perennially top-ranked Allison Fisher. Kim speaks Mandarin Chinese in addition to her native Korean language.

== Titles ==
- 2004 WPBA U.S. Open Nine-ball Championship
- 2004 WPA Women's World Nine-ball Championship
- 2005 Tournament of Champions
- 2006 Asian Ladies 9-Ball Billiards Tour
- 2006 WPA Women's World Nine-ball Championship
- 2007 WPBA Carolina Classic
- 2009 WPBA U.S. Open Nine-ball Championship
- 2009 WPBA Colorado Classic
- 2009 East Asian Games Nine-Ball Singles
- 2010 WPBA U.S. Open Nine-ball Championship
- 2010 Tournament of Champions
- 2010 Billiards Digest Player of the Year
- 2011 WPA Amway Cup 9-Ball Open
- 2011 WPBA Tour Championship
- 2011 Tournament of Champions
- 2012 WPA Women's World Ten-ball Championship
- 2012 Tournament of Champions
- 2013 Ultimate 10-Ball Championship
- 2013 WPBA Masters 9-Ball Championship
- 2013 Queens Cup
- 2014 WPBA Masters 9-Ball Championship
- 2014 Billiards Digest Player of the Year
- 2015 China Open 9-Ball Championship
- 2015 All Japan Championship Nine-ball
- 2015 Tournament of Champions
- 2015 Tornado Open 9-Ball
- 2015 Billiards Digest Player of the Year
- 2016 WPBA U.S. Open Nine-ball Championship
- 2018 WPBA Grand Slam Nine-ball
- 2019 World Team Trophy Women's 9-Ball
