= Pan Xiaoting =

Chinese pool player

Personal information
- Born: February 25, 1982 (age 44) Yanzhou District, Jining, Shandong

Pool career
- Country: China
- Turned pro: 2006

Pan Xiaoting
Medal record

Women's pool

Representing China

Asian Games
Gold medal – first place	2010 Guangzhou	9-ball individual
Bronze medal – third place	2006 Doha	9-ball individual
Bronze medal – third place	2006 Doha	8-ball individual

Pan Xiaoting (simplified Chinese: 潘晓婷; traditional Chinese: 潘曉婷; pinyin: Pān Xiǎotíng; born 25 February 1982) is a Chinese professional pool player.

== Professional biography ==
She is the first Chinese woman to play full-time on the WPBA Tour, and has been nicknamed the "Queen of Nine-Ball".

=== WPBA Rookie of the Year in 2006 ===
Pan was named WPBA Rookie of the Year in 2006 and finished the season ranked #13. Pan won her first WPBA tournament at the 2007 Great Lakes Classic. Later she won the 2007 WPA World Nine-ball Championship held in Taoyuan City, Taiwan. Pan is a friendly rival of fellow Asian WPBA player Kim Ga-young; the two met in the finals of the 2007 Carolina Women's Billiard Classic, with Kim prevailing 7 to 6 in the WPBA's first all-Asian championship match. Kim and Pan finished the 2007 WPBA season ranked #2 and #3, respectively, behind perennially top-ranked Allison Fisher. Pan is also a good friend of Chinese snooker player Ding Junhui. In 2008, Pan won the BCA GenerationPool.com title on the WPBA tour, and in 2010 added a WPBA major to her resume at the Tour Championships. She went undefeated in Niagara Falls that year defeating Kim Ga-young of South Korea in the semi-finals 7–6, and Karen Corr of Northern Ireland 7–4 in the final.

=== Matches against Ronnie O'Sullivan ===
In December 2013, Pan participated in an exhibition match (9-ball and snooker) against snooker ace Ronnie O'Sullivan in Yanzhou, which she won 7–6 in 9-ball and lost 2–1 in snooker 6-red.

In November 2018, a second exhibition match between Pan and O'Sullivan took place in China, as well. The professional 9-ball champion Pan won 7–6.

== Titles ==
- 2010 WPBA Tour Championship
- 2010 Asian Games Nine-ball Singles
- 2008 All Japan Championship Nine-ball
- 2008 WPBA BCA 9-Ball Championship
- 2007 WPA Women's World Nine-ball Championship
- 2007 WPBA Great Lakes Classic
- 2005 All Japan Championship Nine-ball
- 2002 All Japan Championship Nine-ball
