= WPA Women's World Ten-ball Championship =

Tournament information
- Established: 2009
- Organisation(s): World Pool Association
- Format: Double-elimination / Single-elimination
- Recent edition: 2026
- Current champion: Chezka Centeno (PHI)

The WPA Women's World Ten-ball Championship is a professional ten-ball pool tournament sanctioned by the World Pool Association (WPA). While the WPA World Ten-ball Championship was initially an open event, the women's specific championship has been held intermittently since 2009.

== History ==
The inaugural tournament was held in 2009 in Quezon City, Philippines. Rubilen Amit defeated Liu Shin-mei in the final. In 2010, Austrian Jasmin Ouschan won the event in a hill-hill final against Kim Ga-young. The following year, Kelly Fisher won her first world title by defeating Tsai Pei-chen 10‍–‍4. Kim, who had been runner-up in 2010 won the 2012 event, following a 10‍–‍5 win over Chen Siming. Amit became the first female player to win the title twice when she reclaimed it in 2013, defeating Fisher 10‍–‍7.

After a nine-year hiatus, the event was revived as part of the Pro Billiard Series. The event, moved to Klagenfurt, Austria. Chou Chieh-yu won the 2022 event, defeating Wei Tzu-chien 9‍–‍3. Chezka Centeno defeated Han Yu 9‍–‍5 in the 2023 final. Centeno went undefeated throughout the tournament, winning 71% of all the racks she played.

In 2024, the format shifted toward a "sets" system. This meant that matches were played as the best of five sets, each set a race to four racks rather than a single long race to a specific number of racks. The 2024 event was played in San Juan, Puerto Rico. Kristina Tkach and Seo Seoa's final in 2024 lasted over four and a half hours, went to a deciding set, with Tkach winning 3‍–‍2. The event moved again in 2025, this time to Bali, Indonesia, Centeno won the event for the second time after a 3–2 set victory over Amit.

== List of winners ==
Year	Location	Winner	Runner-up	Final score	Ref
2009	Manila, Philippines	(Philippines) Rubilen Amit	(Chinese Taipei) Liu Shin-mei	10–4	
2010	Manila, Philippines	(Austria) Jasmin Ouschan	(South Korea) Kim Ga-young	9–8	
2011	Manila, Philippines	(United Kingdom) Kelly Fisher	(Chinese Taipei) Tsai Pei-chen	10–8	
2012	Manila, Philippines	(South Korea) Kim Ga-young	(China) Chen Siming	10–5	
2013	Manila, Philippines	(Philippines) Rubilen Amit	(United Kingdom) Kelly Fisher	10–7	
2022	Klagenfurt, Austria	(Chinese Taipei) Chou Chieh-yu	(Chinese Taipei) Wei Tzu-chien	9–3	
2023	Klagenfurt, Austria	(Philippines) Chezka Centeno	(China) Han Yu	9–5	
2024	San Juan, Puerto Rico	(Russia) Kristina Tkach	(South Korea) Seo Seoa	3–2 (sets)	
2025	Bali, Indonesia	(Philippines) Chezka Centeno	(Philippines) Rubilen Amit	3–2 (sets)	
2026	Rome, Italy	(Belarus) Margarita Styler	(Philippines) Chezka Centeno	3–2 (sets)	

== See also ==
- WPA Women's World Nine-ball Championship
