= 2024 WPA Women's World Nine-ball Championship =

2024 Massé WPA Women's World Nine-ball Championship
Tournament information
- Dates: 3–8 September 2024
- Venue: Claudelands Events Centre
- City: Hamilton
- Country: New Zealand
- Organisation: World Pool-Billiard Association
- Format: Double elimination / single elimination
- Discipline: Nine-ball
- Total prize fund: $175,000
- Winner's share: $50,000

Final
- Champion: Rubilen Amit (PHI)
- Runner-up: Chen Siming (CHN)
- Score: 3–1 (sets)

The 2024 Massé WPA Women's World Nine-ball Championship was a professional nine-ball pool championship that took place from 3 to 8 September 2024. It was the 31st edition of the WPA Women's World Nine-ball Championship and was held at the Claudelands Events Centre in Hamilton, New Zealand. The event featured 48 players and was sanctioned by the World Pool-Billiard Association (WPA) as part of the Pro Billiard Series. Rubilen Amit won the event, defeating Chen Siming in the final by three sets to one.

This was Amit's third World Championship, having won the WPA Women's World Ten-ball Championship in 2009 and 2013.

== Prize money ==
The total prize fund for the event was $175,000, with the winner receiving $50,000. A breakdown can be seen below:

Position	Prize money
Winner	$50,000
Runner-up	$30,000
Semi-finalist	$15,000
5th–8th Place	$7,998
9th–16th Place	$4,125
Total	$175,000

== Knockout stage ==
The following is the results from the knockout stage of the event. Players in bold denote match winners. Matches in the single-elimination stage were played as the best of five sets, with each set being a race to 4 games.

Round of 16
Marharyta Fefilava (BLR)	1
**Kristina Tkach (RUS)**	**3**
Kristina Zlateva (BUL)	2
**Liu Shasha (CHN)**	**3**
Silviana Lu (INA)	1
**Wei Tzu-chien (TPE)**	**3**
Chezka Centeno (PHI)	1
**Rubilen Amit (PHI)**	**3**
Chen Chia-hua (TPE)	2
**Jasmin Ouschan (AUT)**	**3**
Wang Wan-ling (TPE)	1
**Chihiro Kawahara (JPN)**	**3**
**Chen Siming (CHN)**	**3**
Seo Seoa (KOR)	0
**Kelly Fisher (GBR)**	**3**
Sakura Muramatsu (JPN)	0

Quarter-finals
**Kristina Tkach (RUS)**	**3**
Liu Shasha (CHN)	2
Wei Tzu-chien (TPE)	2
**Rubilen Amit (PHI)**	**3**
Jasmin Ouschan (AUT)	2
**Chihiro Kawahara (JPN)**	**3**
**Chen Siming (CHN)**	**3**
Kelly Fisher (GBR)	2

Semi-finals
Kristina Tkach (RUS)	2
**Rubilen Amit (PHI)**	**3**
Chihiro Kawahara (JPN)	0
**Chen Siming (CHN)**	**3**

Final
**Rubilen Amit (PHI)**	**3**
Chen Siming (CHN)	1
