= WPA World Ten-ball Championship =

World Championship in pool, played in Ten-ball

- Current season, competition or edition: 2026 WPA World Ten-ball Championship
- Sport: Pool
- Founded: 2008
- Founder: World Pool-Billiard Association
- Most recent champions: Wojciech Szewczyk (2026) & Marharyta Fefilava (2026)
- Related competitions: Eight-ball, Nine-ball
- Website: wpapool.com

The WPA World Ten-ball Championship is a professional ten-ball pool tournament sanctioned by the World Pool-Billiard Association (WPA). The event was first held in 2008 in the Philippines, followed by playings there in 2009 and 2011. After not being contested for several years, it was resurrected in 2015 by boxer Manny Pacquiao, who successfully campaigned to the WPA for the championship to be moved from Metro Manila to General Santos. An event was announced in June 2018, but was postponed until relocating to the Las Vegas Valley in 2019.

== History ==
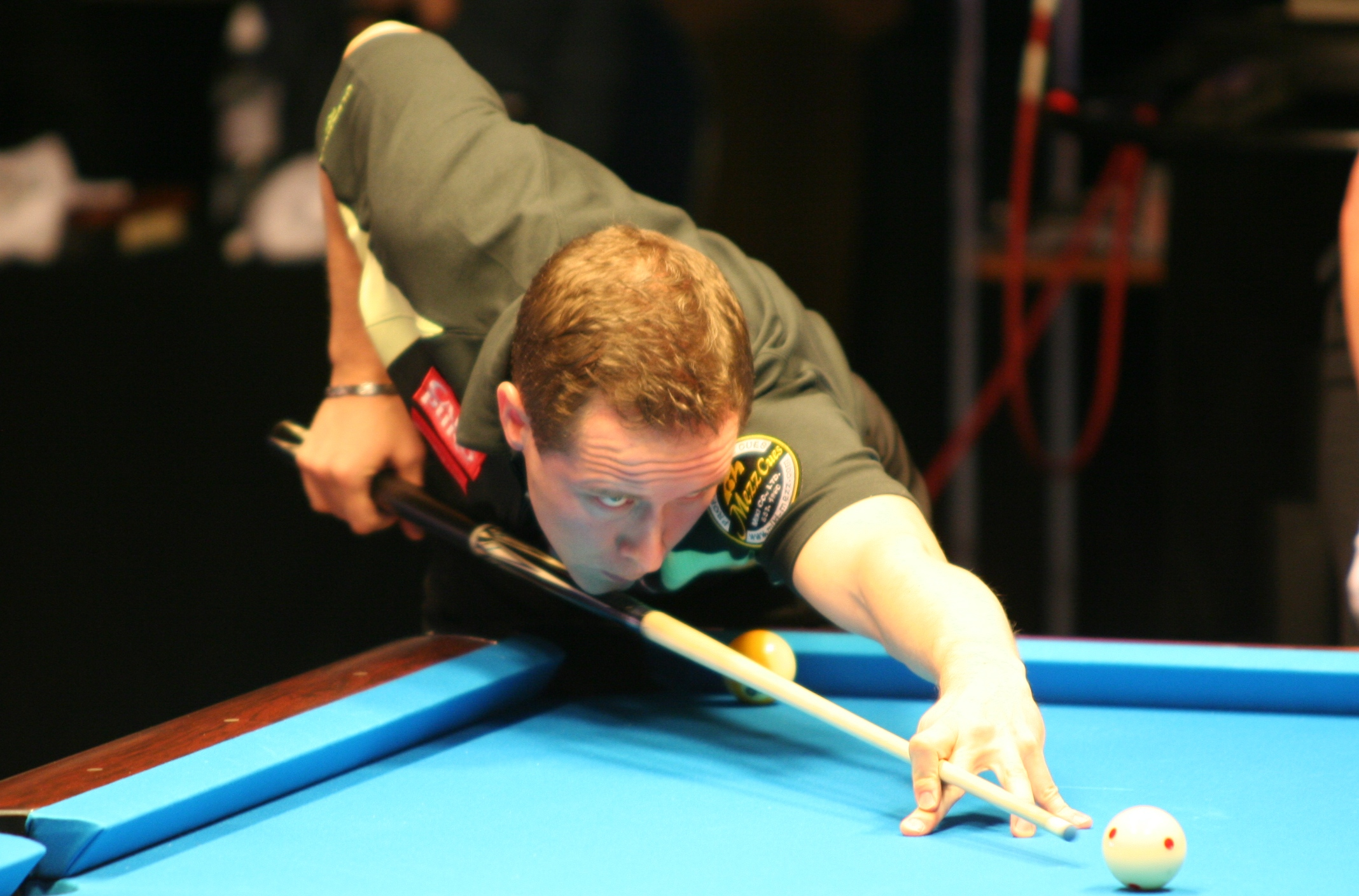
2009 champion Mika Immonen

In 2008 the World Ten-ball Championship was held, with prizes totaling US$400,000 (₱18,860,000), was held at the Philippine International Convention Center, Manila, 29 September through 5 October 2008. There were 128 players competing, representing 44 countries. Vice President of the Philippines Noli de Castro made the ceremonial opening break shot, witnessed by officials of the WPA, International Olympic Committee, Philippine Sports Commission, Philippine Olympic Committee, Billiards and Snooker Congress of the Philippines, and tournament organizer Raya Sports.

In the final, England's Darren Appleton defeated nineteen-year-old Wu Jia-qing, who was using a borrowed cue stick, winning $100,000. Appleton was also quoted as saying: "Pool is an easy choice for me as a sport as I have to choose among boxing, football and pool among others. But this victory is sweeter for me and I have to dedicate this to my parents, whose relationship is in the rocks. With the $100,000 grand prize, first, I have to give some to my parents, because we had a difficult way of living."

WPA president Ian Anderson would later announce: "This early, there's a strong clamor for the WTBC and it will definitely be back next year in Manila. It will be staged October of next year and there's also the Philippine Open to be held June 2009. I think Manila is the best place to go in hosting pool and it is living up to its billing as the pool Mecca in Asia." The event would later take place in 2009, being won by Finn Mika Immonen, and then again in 2011 by Dutchman Huidji See. A later event was reimagined by boxer Manny Pacquiao in 2015, with the event being won by Taipei's Ko Pin-yi.

On 30 July 2018, the WPA announced the return of the World Ten-ball Championship. The event was set to take place in the Philippines, but was later postponed. Taipei's Ko Ping-chung won the 2019 event, which took place in Las Vegas. The 2020 edition of the championship was postponed because of the COVID-19 pandemic. The 2021 edition was won by Albanian Eklent Kaçi, and the 2022 edition was won by Pole Wojciech Szewczyk.

== Winners ==
The following is a list of Men's WPA World Ten-Ball Champions.

Year	Host	Final			Semifinalists
Year	Host	Winner	Score	Runner-up	Semifinalists
2008	Philippines	(England); Darren Appleton	13–11	(Chinese Taipei); Wu Jia-qing	(Philippines); Demosthenes Pulpul	(Netherlands); Niels Feijen
2009	Philippines	(Finland); Mika Immonen	11–6	(Philippines); Lee Vann Corteza	(Philippines); Antonio Lining	(Spain); David Alcaide
2011	Philippines	(Netherlands); Huidji See	11–8	(China); Fu Jianbo	(Philippines); Carlo Biado	(Japan); Yukio Akakariyama
2015	Philippines	(Chinese Taipei); Ko Pin-yi	11–9	(Philippines); Carlo Biado	(Chinese Taipei); Ko Ping-chung	(Spain); David Alcaide
2019	United States	(Chinese Taipei); Ko Ping-chung	10–7	(Germany); Joshua Filler	(Chinese Taipei); Ko Pin-yi	(Japan); Masato Yoshioka
2021	United States	(Albania); Eklent Kaçi	10–6	(Japan); Naoyuki Ōi	(Philippines); Johann Chua	(Singapore); Aloysius Yapp
2022	United States	(Poland); Wojciech Szewczyk	10–8	(Peru); Christopher Tévez	(Albania); Eklent Kaçi	(Scotland); Jayson Shaw
2023	United States	(Albania); Eklent Kaçi	10–7	(Spain); Francisco Sánchez Ruiz	(Russia); Fedor Gorst	(Germany); Joshua Filler
2024	United States	(Philippines); Carlo Biado	3–1 (Note: Unlike in previous editions of the tournament, this score is based on sets, not racks. In this case, each set is played in race to four racks. Biado won 3 sets (4-1, 4-2, and 4-1) while Oi won 1 (4-3).)	(Japan); Naoyuki Ōi	(Estonia); Denis Grabe	(United States); Fedor Gorst
2025	Vietnam	(Chinese Taipei); Ko Ping-chung	3–1	(Greece); Alexander Kazakis	(United States); Shane Van Boening	(Philippines); Carlo Biado
2026	Vietnam	(Poland); Wojciech Szewczyk	3–1	(Albania); Eklent Kaçi	(Germany); Joshua Filler	(Bosnia and Herzegovina); Sanjin Pehlivanović

== Women ==
The following is a list of Women's WPA World Ten-Ball Champions.

Year	Host	Final		Semifinalists
Year	Host	Winner	Runner-up	Semifinalists
2009	Philippines	(Philippines); Rubilen Amit	(Chinese Taipei); Liu Shin-mei	(Japan); Akimi Kajitani	(Austria); Jasmin Ouschan
2010	Philippines	(Austria); Jasmin Ouschan	(South Korea); Kim Ga-young	(England); Kelly Fisher	(Philippines); Rubilen Amit
2011	Philippines	(England); Kelly Fisher	(Chinese Taipei); Tsai Pei-Chen	(South Korea); Kim Ga-young	(China); Han Yu
2012	Philippines	(South Korea); Kim Ga-young	(China); Chen Siming	(China); Fu Xiaofang	(South Korea); Cha Yu-ram
2013	Philippines	(Philippines); Rubilen Amit	(England); Kelly Fisher	(China); Han Yu	(Chinese Taipei); Tsai Pei-Chen
2022	Austria	(Chinese Taipei); Chou Chieh-yu	(Chinese Taipei); Wei Tzu-chien	(Austria); Jasmin Ouschan	(England); Kelly Fisher
2023	Austria	(Philippines); Chezka Centeno	(China); Han Yu	(England); Allison Fisher	(England); Kelly Fisher
2024	Puerto Rico	(Individual Neutral Athletes); Kristina Tkach	(South Korea); Seo Seoa	(Philippines); Chezka Centeno	(Austria); Jasmin Ouschan
2025	Indonesia	(Philippines); Chezka Centeno	(Philippines); Rubilen Amit	(Individual Neutral Athletes); Marharyta Fefilava	(China); Liu Shasha
2026	Italy	(Belarus); Margarita Styer	(Philippines); Chezka Centeno	(Chinese Taipei); Chou Chieh-yu	(South Korea); Seo Seoa

== Mixed teams ==
The following is a list of Men's & Women's WPA World Mixed Teams Ten-Ball Champions.

Year	Host	Final		Semifinalists
Year	Host	Winners	Runner-up	Semifinalists
2022	Austria	(Philippines); Rubilen Amit; Carlo Biado; Johann Chua	(United Kingdom); Kelly Fisher; Jayson Shaw; Darren Appleton	(Germany); Pia Filler; Joshua Filler; Thorsten Hohmann	(Chinese Taipei); Chou Chieh-yu; Wu Kun-lin; Chang Jung-lin
2023	(Puerto Rico) San Juan	(Germany); Pia Filler; Joshua Filler; Moritz Neuhausen	(Chinese Taipei); Chou Chieh-yu; Chang Jung-lin; Wu Kun-lin	(Austria); Jasmin Ouschan; Albin Ouschan; Mario He	(Portugal); Sara Rocha; João Grilo; Miguel Silva
2026	(United States) Las Vegas	(Philippines); Carlo Biado; Rubilen Amit; Chezka Centeno; Jefrey Roda	(Poland); Wojciech Szewczyk; Katarzyna Wesołowska; Daniel Macioł	(Austria); Albin Ouschan; Jasmin Ouschan; Mario He; Max Lechner	(United States); Shane Van Boening; Skyler Woodward; Savannah Easton

== Doubles ==
In 2025, the WPA organized a men's only 10-ball doubles championship that was held in Bali, labeled as the first World Championship in the modality of doubles 10-ball.

Year	Host	Final		Semifinalists
Year	Host	Winners	Runner-up	Semifinalists
2025	(Indonesia) Nusa Dua	(Chinese Taipei); Wu Kun-lin; Hsieh Chia-chen	(Canada); Alex Pagulayan; John Morra	(Poland); Wojciech Szewczyk; Konrad Juszczyszyn; Daniel Macioł	(Peru); Gerson Martínez; Christopher Tévez
2026	(Indonesia) Nusa Dua	(Spain); Francisco Sánchez Ruiz; David Alcaide; Jonás Souto	(Philippines); Carlo Biado; AJ Manas	(Poland); Wojciech Szewczyk; Daniel Macioł	(Indonesia); Irsal Nasution; Albert Januarta
