= 2010 WPA Women's World Ten-ball Championship =

Tournament information
- Dates: October 31–November 6, 2010
- Venue: SM Mall of Asia
- City: Manila, Philippines
- Organisation: World Pool-Billiard Association /Raya Sports
- Format: Double-elimination / single-elimination
- Discipline: Ten-ball
- Total prize fund: $75,000
- Winner's share: $20,000

Final
- Champion: Jasmin Ouschan (AUT)
- Runner-up: Kim Ga-young (KOR)
- Score: 9–8

The 2010 WPA Women's World Ten-ball Championship was a professional ten-ball pool tournament organised by the World Pool-Billiard Association (WPA) and Raya Sports. It was the second edition of the event and was held at the SM Mall of Asia in Manila, Philippines, from October 31 to November 6, 2010. Jasmin Ouschan won the event after a 9‍–‍8 victory in the final.

== Knockout draw ==
The following results show the single-elimination, which had 24 players. Players in bold represent match winners. The top eight seeds received a first-round bye into the Round of 16. Matches in the early knockout rounds were race-to-8 racks, the semi-finals were race-to-9, and the final was a race-to-10.

Round of 24
**Park Eun-ji (KOR)**	**8**
Zhu Shuming (CHN)	6
**Kim Ga-young (KOR)**	**8**
Hyun Ji-won (KOR)	4
**Line Kjørsvik (NOR)**	**8**
Marika Poikkijoki (FIN)	6
**Rubilen Amit (PHL)**	**8**
Janet Ashton (ENG)	2
**Ina Jentschura (GER)**	**8**
Zhou Doudou (CHN)	6
Brittany Bryant (CAN)	4
**Li Jia (CHN)**	**8**
**Karen Corr (IRL)**	**8**
Dara Ajut (INA)	2
**Miyuki Kuribayashi (JPN)**	**8**
Keiko Yukawa (JPN)	4

Round of 16
**Park Eun-ji (KOR)**	**8**
Tsai Pei-chen (TPE)	6
**Kim Ga-young (KOR)**	**8**
Cha Yu-ram (KOR)	3
**Line Kjørsvik (NOR)**	**8**
Tan Ho-yun (TPE)	7
**Rubilen Amit (PHL)**	**8**
Han Yu (CHN)	7
Ina Jentschura (GER)	3
**Kelly Fisher (ENG)**	**8**
**Li Jia (CHN)**	**8**
Wu Jing (CHN)	7
**Karen Corr (IRL)**	**8**
Akimi Kajitani (JPN)	5
Miyuki Kuribayashi (JPN)	5
**Jasmin Ouschan (AUT)**	**8**

Quarter-finals
Park Eun-ji (KOR)	1
**Kim Ga-young (KOR)**	**8**
Line Kjørsvik (NOR)	2
**Rubilen Amit (PHL)**	**8**
**Kelly Fisher (ENG)**	**8**
Li Jia (CHN)	3
Karen Corr (IRL)	2
**Jasmin Ouschan (AUT)**	**8**

Semi-finals
**Kim Ga-young (KOR)**	**9**
Rubilen Amit (PHL)	5
Kelly Fisher (ENG)	5
**Jasmin Ouschan (AUT)**	**9**

Final
Kim Ga-young (KOR)	6
**Jasmin Ouschan (AUT)**	**10**
