= 2022 WPA World Ten-ball Championship =

Cue sports tournament

2022 Predator World 10-Ball Championship
Tournament information
- Dates: 28 March–1 April
- Venue: Rio All-Suite Hotel & Casino
- City: Las Vegas, Nevada, United States
- Organisation(s): World Pool-Billiard Association; CueSports International
- Format: Double-elimination / single-elimination
- Discipline: Ten-ball
- Total prize fund: $226,000
- Winner's share: $60,000
- Defending champion: Eklent Kaçi (ALB)

Final
- Champion: Wojciech Szewczyk (POL)
- Runner-up: Christopher Tévez (PER)
- Score: 10–8

The 2022 WPA World Ten-ball Championship was a professional pool tournament for the discipline of ten-ball organised by the World Pool-Billiard Association (WPA) and CueSports International. It was the seventh WPA World Ten-ball Championship. Held in Las Vegas, the event started on March 28 with the championship match on April 1. The event featured a prize fund of $226,000.

The competition began with 128 participants, selected according to world and continental pool rankings as well as qualifying events. The tournament was played as a double-elimination bracket until 32 players remained, at which point it changed to a single-elimination format.

Defending champion Eklent Kaçi of Albania reached the semi-finals before being eliminated, as did Jayson Shaw of Scotland. In the championship match, Wojciech Szewczyk of Poland defeated Christopher Tévez of Peru, 10–8.

== Knockout draw ==
The following results only show the single-elimination stage comprising the final 32 players. All matches at this stage were played as race-to-ten racks. Players in bold represent match winners.

First round
**Naoyuki Ōi (JPN)**	10
Blaine Barcus (USA)	4
John Schmidt (USA)	6
**Chris Reinhold (USA)**	10
Konrad Juszczyszyn (POL)	7
**Lee Vann Corteza (PHI)**	10
Alex Pagulayan (CAN)	3
**Eklent Kaçi (ALB)**	10
Shane Van Boening (USA)	6
**Daniel Macioł (POL)**	10
**Edgie Geronimo (PHI)**	10
Marc Bijsterbosch (NED)	6
**Wojciech Szewczyk (POL)**	10
Oscar Dominguez (USA)	6
Eric Roberts (USA)	4
**Denis Grabe (EST)**	10
**Mieszko Fortuński (POL)**	10
Roberto Bartol (CRO)	9
Justin Martin (USA)	2
**Sanjin Pehlivanović (BIH)**	10
Jonás Souto (ESP)	3
**Jayson Shaw (SCO)**	10
Ralf Souquet (GER)	5
**Francisco Sánchez Ruiz (ESP)**	10
David Alcaide (ESP)	6
**Christopher Tévez (PER)**	10
Michael Schneider (SUI)	7
**Carlo Biado (PHI)**	10
Sharik Sayed (SGP)	7
**Robbie Capito (HKG)**	10
**Darren Appleton (ENG)**	10
Mika Immonen (FIN)	5

Second round
**(Japan) Naoyuki Ōi**	10
(United States) Chris Reinhold	5
(Philippines) Lee Vann Corteza	6
**(Albania) Eklent Kaçi**	10
(Poland) Daniel Macioł	8
**(Philippines) Edgie Geronimo**	10
**(Poland) Wojciech Szewczyk**	10
(Estonia) Denis Grabe	6
(Poland) Mieszko Fortuński	7
**(Bosnia and Herzegovina) Sanjin Pehlivanović**	10
**(Scotland) Jayson Shaw**	10
(Spain) Francisco Sánchez Ruiz	5
**(Peru) Christopher Tévez**	10
(Philippines) Carlo Biado	8
(Hong Kong) Robbie Capito	9
**(England) Darren Appleton**	10

Quarter-final
(Japan) Naoyuki Ōi	9
**(Albania) Eklent Kaçi**	10
(Philippines) Edgie Geronimo	9
**(Poland) Wojciech Szewczyk**	10
(Bosnia and Herzegovina) Sanjin Pehlivanović	4
**(Scotland) Jayson Shaw**	10
**(Peru) Christopher Tévez**	10
(England) Darren Appleton	3

Semi-final
(Albania) Eklent Kaçi	9
**(Poland) Wojciech Szewczyk**	10
(Scotland) Jayson Shaw	6
**(Peru) Christopher Tévez**	10

Final
**(Poland) Wojciech Szewczyk**	10
(Peru) Christopher Tévez	8
