= 2019 WPA World Ten-ball Championship =

World pool championship, held July 2019

2019 Predator World 10-Ball Championship
- The official artwork for the event

Tournament information
- Dates: July 22–26, 2019
- Venue: Rio All-Suite Hotel & Casino
- City: Las Vegas, Nevada, U.S.
- Organisation(s): World Pool-Billiard Association; CueSports International
- Format: Double-elimination / single-elimination
- Discipline: Ten-ball
- Total prize fund: $132,000
- Winner's share: $30,000

Final
- Champion: Ko Ping-chung (TPE)
- Runner-up: Joshua Filler (GER)
- Score: 10–7

The 2019 WPA World Ten-ball Championship was a professional pool tournament for the discipline of ten-ball organised by the World Pool-Billiard Association (WPA) and CueSports International. It was the fifth WPA World Ten-ball Championship; the previous championship was held in 2015. After plans for an event in both 2016 and 2018 to be held in Manila fell through, it was agreed to hold a 2019 event at the Rio All-Suite Hotel & Casino in Las Vegas as part of a three-year deal for the event to be played in the United States. The tournament ran concurrently with the Billiard Congress of America's National Ten-ball event from July 22 to 26. The event was sponsored by cue manufacturer Predator Group.

The competition featured 64 participants, selected according to world and continental pool rankings as well as qualifying events. The tournament was played as a double-elimination bracket until 16 players remained, at which point it changed to a single-elimination format. Ko Ping-chung, representing Chinese Taipei, won the event, defeating German player Joshua Filler 10–7 in the final. Ko's brother Ko Pin-yi, who was the defending champion, lost to Filler 10–8 in the semi-final. The event featured a prize fund of $132,000, the winner receiving $30,000.

== Format ==
The WPA World Ten-ball Championship is a professional ten-ball pool tournament first held in Pasay, Philippines in 2008. The 2019 event was the first official world ten-ball championship since the 2015 WPA World Ten-ball Championship in General Santos after plans for events in both 2016 and 2018 held in Manila fell through. In December 2018, event organiser CueSports International partnered with the World Pool-Billiard Association (WPA) to stage the event with sponsorship from cue manufacturers Predator Group. It was held at the Rio All-Suite Hotel & Casino in Las Vegas which had also hosted the 2019 WPA Players Championship earlier that year and had plans to host the ten-ball event for three years. The event was the first pool world championship held in the US since 1997, and the first ten-ball world championship held outside of the Philippines. The tournament was played alongside the Billiard Congress of America's National Ten-ball Championship. The event contributed points towards the WPA world rankings.

The event featured 64 players, entries being selected from ranking lists for players tours, such as the Euro Tour and the Asian Tour, and 16 qualifiers who had won events held in Las Vegas from June and July 2019. The tournament was played with a double-elimination knockout structure until 16 players remained, when it became a single-elimination format. Double-elimination matches were played as the first to eight racks, whilst the single-elimination matches were played as the first to ten racks. Matches were also played under the alternating break format, each player taking turns to break at the start of every rack. The event was broadcast worldwide on YouTube.

=== Participant summary ===
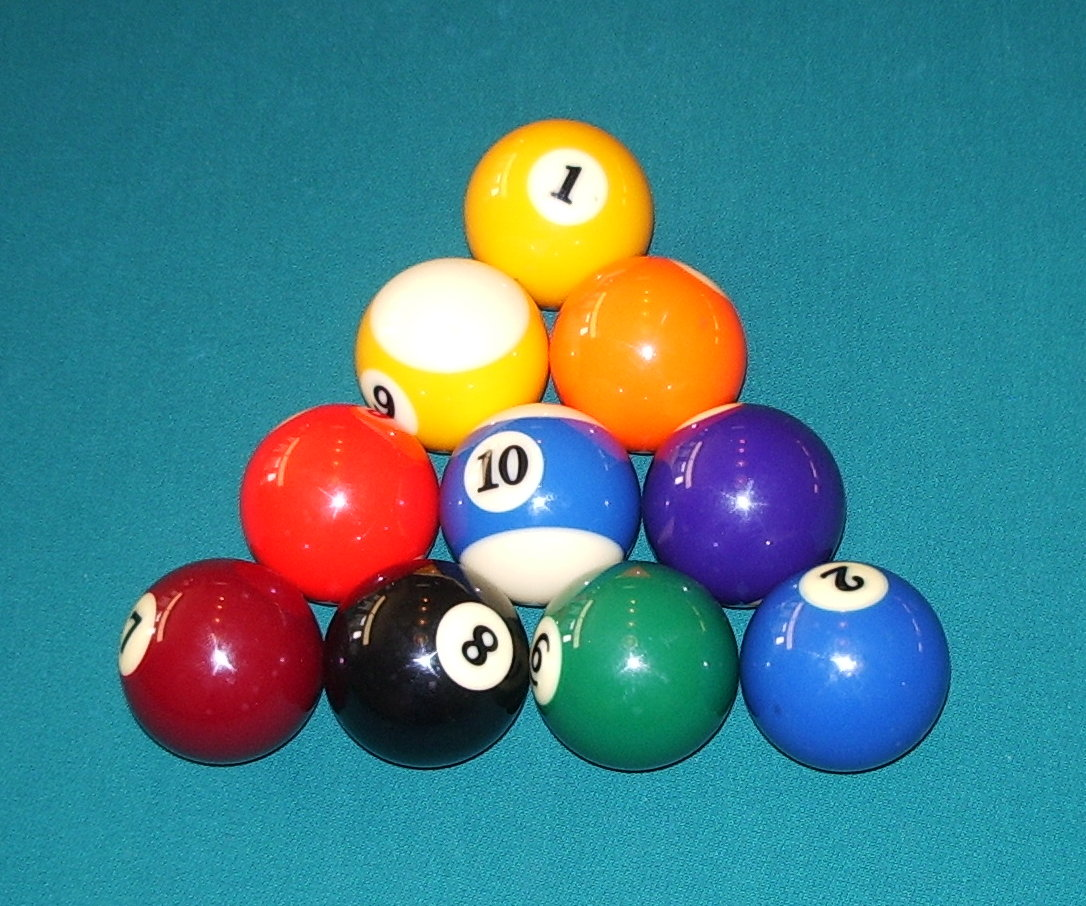
A standard ten-ball rack

The tournament featured 64 players, the allocation for participants being awarded to the highest ranked players according to several organisations:

- World Pool-Billiard Association (16)
- Asian Pocket Billiard Union (7)
- European Pocket Billiard Federation (7)
- Billiard Congress of America (6)
- Confederación Panamericana de Billar (3)
- All Africa Pool Association (2)
- Oceania Pocket Billiard Association (2)

Five other players were chosen as wildcard entries by the event organisers. After the 48 players were chosen, 16 places were awarded to players from local qualifying events held in the weeks leading up to the event.

=== Prize fund ===
The tournament's total prize fund was $132,000, $32,000 taken from players' entry fees and $100,000 added by the event organisers. Half of the 64 participants received prize money for their event placing.

Prize money awarded
Place	Prize money
Winner	$30,000
Finalist	$20,000
Semi-finalist	$10,000
Quarter-finalist	$5,000
Last 16	$2,500
17–24	$1,750
25–32	$1,000
Total	$132,000

== Tournament summary ==
=== Double elimination stage ===
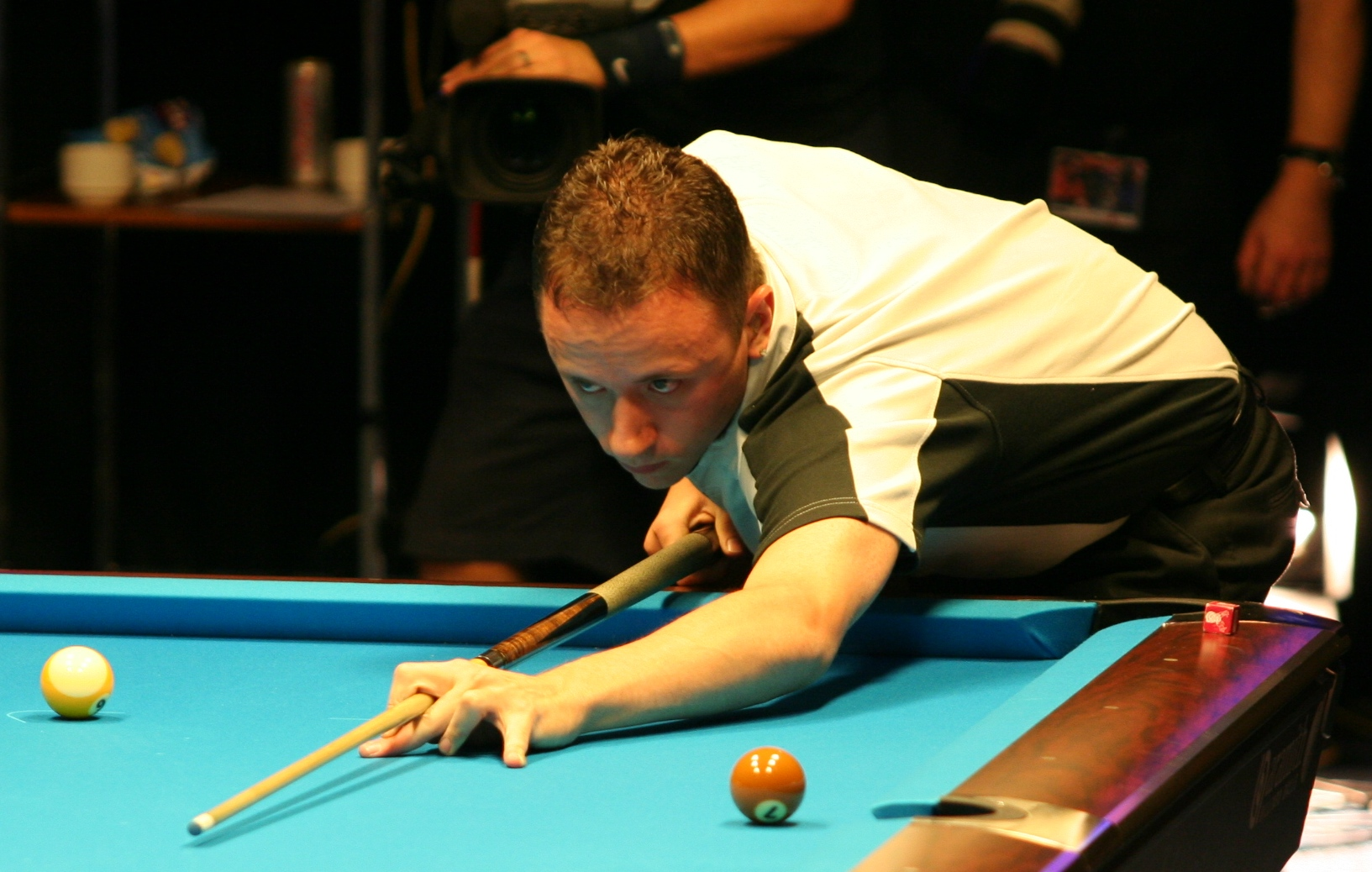
Shane Van Boening was defeated by his event roommate Billy Thorpe in the opening round of the tournament.

The event began on July 22, 2019, and double elimination rounds were played until July 24. The 2018 WPA World Nine-ball Championship winner Joshua Filler defeated Fan Yang 8–5. Filler lost his second match 1–8 to Johann Chua after losing the first seven racks. Filler reached the knockout (single elimination) round after defeating both Gerson Martinez Boza and Alexander Kazakis 8–2. Defending champion Ko Pin-yi won his opening round match against Ariel Casto, but lost to Alex Pagulayan 8–6 in the second round. He won the next three matches, defeating Duong Quoc Hoang, Danny Olson, and Chris Melling to reach the knockout rounds. His brother Ko Ping-chung won all three of his double-elimination matches to qualify, beating Tomasz Kapłan, Olsen and Pagulayan.

American Mosconi Cup partners Shane Van Boening and Billy Thorpe shared a hotel room for the event and were drawn to play each other in the opening round. In a match that had eight racks which were won without the opponent getting a shot (known as a "break and run"), Thorpe defeated Van Boening 8–5. In their second matches, Van Boening defeated Hunter Lombardo 8–1, and Thorpe defeated John Morra 8–5. Thorpe reached the knockout round of the event by defeating Marc Bijsterbosch, while Van Boening was eliminated by Martinez Boza. Japanese regional qualifier Masato Yoshioka won all three of his double-elimination matches with wins over Wu Kin-lin, Carlo Biado and Jeffrey Ignacio.

Niels Feijen defeated Vilmos Földes 8–7 on a deciding rack in the first round. In his second match, Feijen faced three-time world champion Earl Strickland; both players were Billiard Congress of America Hall of Fame inductees. Strickland took the lead at 2–0 before missing a table length nine-ball, allowing Strickland to win the third rack. Strickland later took a lead of 6–4 before Feijen took the next four racks to win 8–6. Feijen's final break pocketed four balls, leading Strickland to comment "wow". After the match, Feijen stated "He probably played a little better throughout the whole match. You just have to wait for a mistake." Feijen defeated Albin Ouschan to reach the knockout rounds, while Strickland lost 5–8 to Lo Li-wen and was eliminated.

=== Knockout rounds ===
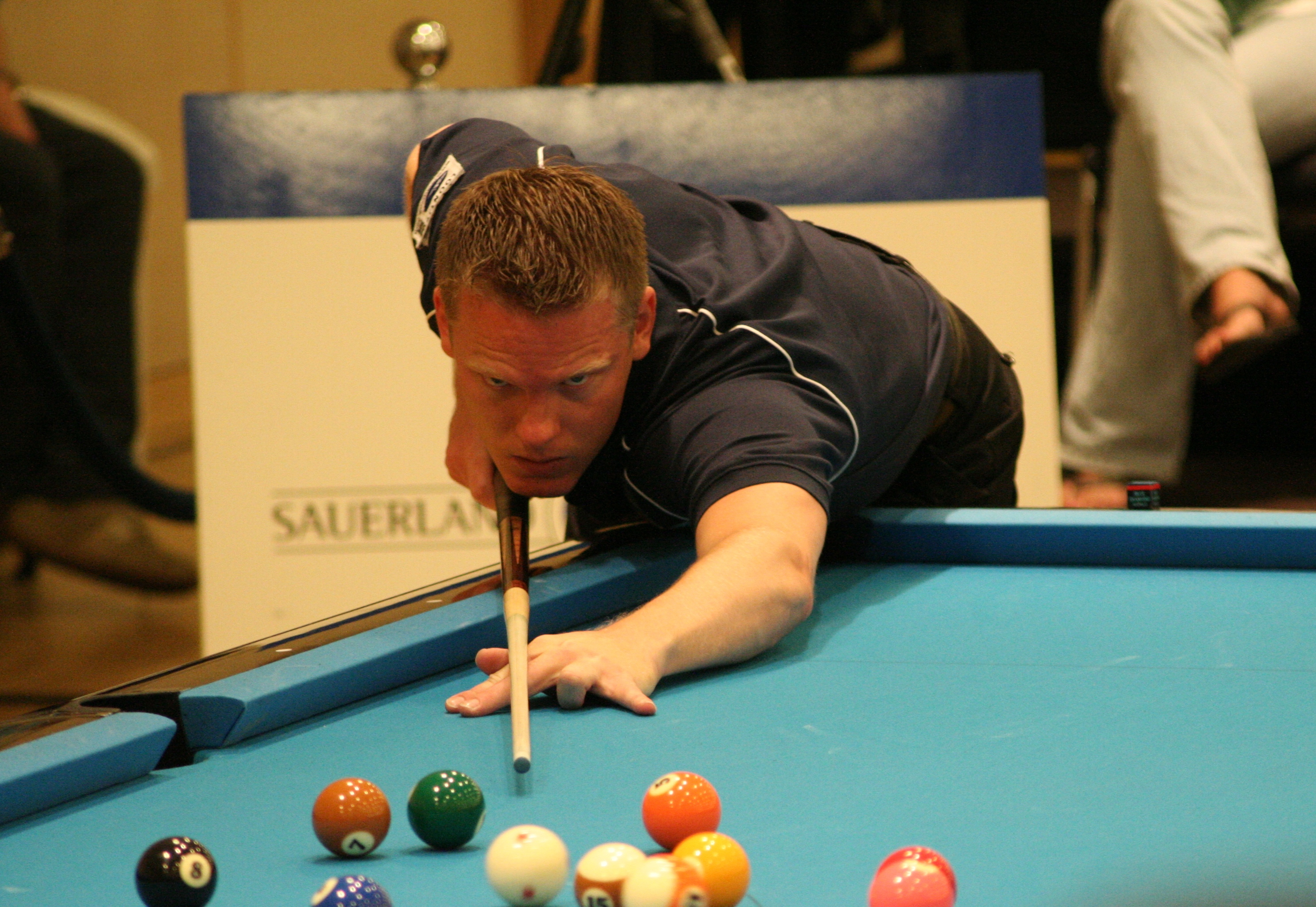
Niels Feijen reached the quarter-final of the event, losing to 2018 WPA World Nine-ball Championship winner Joshua Filler.

The round of 16 and quarter-finals were played on July 25. Ko Pin-yi defeated Johann Chua 10–2 in a one-sided match, then faced Chang Jung-Lin in the quarter-finals. Ko Pin-yi took an early lead of 4–1, which increased to 9–6 with errors from Chang. After Ko Pin-yi failed to pot the 8-ball, Chang cleared the table and break and ran the next rack to trail 8–9, before Ko Pin-yi won the next rack to win the match. Joshua Filler defeated Jayson Shaw and Niels Feijen, both of whom had been undefeated in the tournament to that point, to face Ko Pin-yi in the semi-final. Shaw took an early 4–2 lead in their round of 16 match, but Filler won 10–8. Feijen had previously defeated Wojciech Szewczyk 10–9, but Filler took an early lead at 5–2 in their quarter-final match, eventually winning 10–8.

Ko Ping-chung qualified for the semi-final after defeating Marc Bijsterbosch 10–7 and Alex Pagulayan 10–4. Pagulayan, who had defeated Ralf Souquet 10–9 despite trailing 3–7, struggled to compete against Ko's safety play. Ko Ping-chung trailed in the first match 3–2, before winning eight of the next nine racks to win. The match was temporarily halted after the venue's fire alarm sounded, but both players opted to play on; after the match, Pagulayan commented "We don't care about that. At home, we play with chickens running around", Ko adding the "same thing [happens] in China". Masato Yoshioka defeated both Denis Grabe and Tyler Styer to play Ko Ping-chung in the second semi-final. At the time, Styer was the only remaining American player in the event, having defeated compatriot Billy Thorpe 10–7 in the first round. Yoshioka fell behind early in his semi-final match, trailing 0–4 after two unforced errors. He took six of the next seven racks to lead 6–5. In rack 12 Styer left himself behind the 10-ball when trying to pocket the 8-ball. Styer also missed a jump shot in rack 14, Yoshioka winning the match 10–7.

The semi-finals and final were held on July 26. In the first semi-final, Joshua Filler defeated Ko Pin-yi 10–8. Filler took an early 3–0 lead, Ko Pin-yi being unable to pot a ball on the break (known as a "dry break") on two occasions. Ko fought back and won five of the next six racks to lead the match 5–4. After errors from both players, Filler led 9–6 after two more dry breaks from Ko. Ko won racks 16 and 17, before Filler took the match in rack 18. After the match, Ko commented "I was criticizing and questioning myself, and that's why I didn't do well on the breaks [...] I wasn't very lucky. Every time that Filler missed, I didn't have a good position to shoot." In the second semi-final, Ko Ping-chung reached the final with a 10–3 win over Masato Yoshioka. Yoshioka won the opening rack of the match, but after a series of errors, lost the next four racks to trail 4–1. He tried to recover, capitalising on Ko pocketing the cue ball to cut the deficit to 5–3, but Ko won the remaining five racks to win the match. As a relatively unknown player, Yoshioka commented "My main objective was to just get the experience internationally, but when I got to the semi-finals, I felt a lot of pressure. That's why I didn't play in a way that I want[ed] to play."

In the final Ko Ping-chung defeated Joshua Filler 10–7. Filler took an early 3–1 lead, at which point Ko took a comfort break. Ko later tied the match 5–5, and took the lead for the first time at 6–5. With Filler getting a dry break when trailing 8–7, Ko played the cue ball into the cushion to pot the 3-ball and cleared the table to win the rack and lead 9–7. Ko banked the 1-ball in rack 18 and potted the remaining balls to win the championship. Ko Ping-chung commented, "The last couple of years, Joshua has played really well and I just wanted to challenge him. I didn't know if I could beat him but I just wanted to try my best."

The win was the first major championship win of Ko Ping-chung's career, his best previous major results having been semi-finals. The event mirrored the 2015 WPA World Ten-ball Championship, which was won by Ko Pin-yi while Ko Ping-chung had lost in the semi-final. When asked about the 2015 outcome, Ko Ping-chung answered "I was happy for my brother, but I think if I would have been the winner that may have been better".

== Knockout draw ==
The following results only show the single-elimination stage comprising the final 16 players. All matches at this stage were played as race-to-ten racks and players in bold represent match winners.

First round
Johann Chua (PHL)	2
**Ko Pin-yi (TPE)**	10
**Chang Jung-lin (TPE)**	10
Cheng Yu-hsuan (TPE)	8
**Niels Feijen (NED)**	10
Wojciech Szewczyk (POL)	9
Jayson Shaw (SCO)	8
**Joshua Filler (GER)**	10
Ralf Souquet (GER)	9
**Alex Pagulayan (CAN)**	10
**Ko Ping-chung (TPE)**	10
Marc Bijsterbosch (NED)	7
**Masato Yoshioka (JPN)**	10
Denis Grabe (EST)	6
Billy Thorpe (USA)	7
**Tyler Styer (USA)**	10

Quarter-final
(Chinese Taipei) **Ko Pin-yi**	10
(Chinese Taipei) Chang Jung-lin	8
(Netherlands) Niels Feijen	8
(Germany) **Joshua Filler**	10
(Canada) Alex Pagulayan	4
(Chinese Taipei) **Ko Ping-chung**	10
(Japan) **Masato Yoshioka**	10
(United States) Tyler Styer	7

Semi-final
(Chinese Taipei) Ko Pin-yi	8
**(Germany) Joshua Filler**	10
**(Chinese Taipei) Ko Ping-chung**	10
(Japan) Masato Yoshioka	3

Final
(Germany) Joshua Filler	7
**(Chinese Taipei) Ko Ping-chung**	10
