= Chezka Centeno =

Filipino pool player

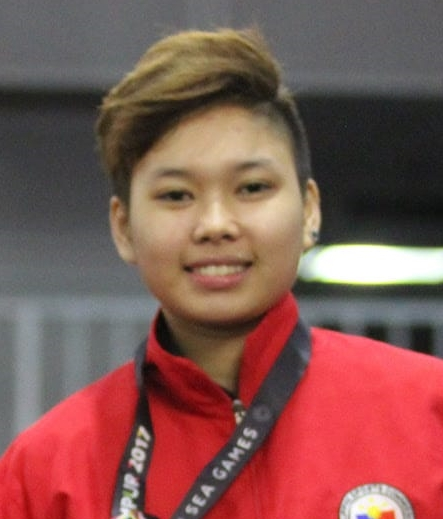
- Centeno in 2017

Personal information
- Born: Chezka Luy Centeno; June 30, 1999 (age 27) Zamboanga City, Philippines

Pool career
- Country: Philippines

Tournament wins
- World Champion: Ten-ball (2023, 2025), Eight-ball (2026)
- Current rank: 10
Medal record
Women's ten-ball
Representing Philippines
World Games
Silver medal – second place	2025 Chengdu	Singles
Women's nine-ball
Representing Philippines
Asian Indoor and Martial Arts Games
Silver medal – second place	2017 Ashgabat	Singles
Southeast Asian Games
Gold medal – first place	2017 Kuala Lumpur	Singles
Gold medal – first place	2015 Singapore	Singles
Gold medal – first place	2019 Philippines	Doubles
Silver medal – second place	2019 Philippines	Singles
Women's ten-ball
Southeast Asian Games
Gold medal – first place	2019 Philippines	Singles
Silver medal – second place	2021 Hanoi	Singles

Chezka Luy Centeno is a Filipina professional pool player from Zamboanga City. Nicknamed "The Flash", she is a three-time world champion, having won the World Ten-ball Championships in 2023 and 2025 and the World Eight-ball Championship in 2026.

== Early life ==
Chezka was born to Fausto Albert and Josephine Luy Centeno in 1999 and is the sixth of seven children. She started playing billiards at five years old and her potential was discovered at age eight when she played in local tournaments in the family's hometown.

== Career ==
At the age of 11, she entered the Philippine National Games and finished third. When she was 12, she was invited to the Kremlin Cup in Russia and finished in the top 32. After being recruited into the national team, Chezka participated at the 2014 Asian Junior Championship and won 1st place under the girls' single category.

She later won the nine-ball women's single at the 2015 Southeast Asian Games, facing fellow Filipina Rubilen Amit in the final.

In 2016, Centeno participated in the Chinese Eight-ball World Championship in China, together with Rubilen Amit and Iris Ranola. Centeno won the inaugural 2022 Asian Pool Federation Women's Nine-ball Championship after defeating Seo Seoa of South Korea in the final, 11–7, held at the Aspire Recreation Centre in Singapore.

In 2023, Centeno defeated three-time women's WPA Women's World Nine-ball Champion Han Yu of China for the WPA Women's World Ten-ball Championship title at the Sportpark Klagenfurt in Klagenfurt, Austria. Drawing a first-round bye, Centeno met former world champion Pan Xiaoting of China in her opening match and secured a 7–4 win. She then faced BCA Hall-of-Famer Allison Fisher in the winner's qualification round match-up and won with a score of 7–3. In the round of 16, she won with a 9–0 whitewash against Melanie Sussenguth of Germany. As the tournament progressed, she continued her strong performance with a 9–2 victory in the quarterfinals against defending world nine-ball and world ten-ball women's champion Chou Chieh-Yu of Chinese Taipei (Taiwan). In the semifinal rematch against Allison Fisher, Centeno fought her way back from being 8–4 down to achieve a 9–8 comeback win, setting up a final match against Yu, which she won convincingly 9–5.

Centeno is the second Filipina women's world champion in pool after Rubilen Amit who won the World Ten-ball Championship event in 2009 and 2013. Centeno won the 2023 top prize of $50,000 (2.8m PHP), the biggest price in women's pool at that time.

In 2024, Centeno won the Predator Pro Billiards Series Las Vegas Ten-ball Women's Open and earned $18,000(P1 million) after defeating Chen Siming of China in two sets (4–2 and 4–2) at the Rio All-Suites Hotel & Casino in the United States.

Centeno finished runner-up at the inaugural 2025 WPA Women's World Eight-ball Championship, narrowly losing to Jasmin Ouchan of Austria 8–7 which was held at the Oneida Casino and Hotel in Green Bay, Wisconsin.

At the 2025 World Games, Centeno won a silver medal in the women's ten-ball event losing to Han Yu in the final.

Also in 2025, Centeno defeated fellow Filipina player Rubilen Amit to win the WPA Women's World Ten-ball Championship. With the win, she joined Rubilen Amit as the second female player to win two World Ten-ball Championships titles.

In 2026, Centeno captured the WPA World Teams Championship alongside fellow Filipino cue artists Carlo Biado, Rubilen Amit and Jefrey Roda. They defeated Team Poland 3–2 in the final. Also in 2026, Centeno clinched his third world title at the Oneida WPA Women's World Eight-ball Championship defeating Kelly Fisher 9–6 in the final and taking home $30,000 top prize. In a social media post by Centeno, she paid tribute and dedicated the title to her late mother, “Ma, I did it! Para sa’yo ’to!” Centeno wrote in a post.

== Titles ==
- 2026 WPA Women's World Eight-ball Championship
- 2026 WPA World Mixed Teams Ten-ball Championship
- 2025 WPA Women's World Ten-ball Championship
- 2025 M Arena Ladies Ten-ball Open
- 2025 Indonesia International Mixed Doubles Ten-ball Open
- 2024 Predator Las Vegas Open
- 2023 WPA Women's World Ten-ball Championship
- 2022 APF Asian Women's Nine-ball Open
- 2019 Southeast Asian Games Ten-ball Singles
- 2019 Southeast Asian Games Nine-ball Doubles
- 2018 The Perfect Storm Open Women's Division
- 2017 Southeast Asian Games Nine-ball Singles
- 2016 Chinook Winds Open Ten-ball
- 2016 Amway Cup 9-Ball Open
- 2015 Southeast Asian Games Nine-ball Singles
- 2015 WPA World Nine-ball Junior championship
