= 2021 WPA World Ten-ball Championship =

Cue sports tournament

2021 Predator World 10-Ball Championship
Tournament information
- Dates: September 6–10, 2021
- Venue: Rio All-Suite Hotel & Casino
- City: Las Vegas, Nevada, United States
- Organisation(s): World Pool-Billiard Association; CueSports International
- Format: Double-elimination / single-elimination
- Discipline: Ten-ball
- Winner's share: $35,000
- Defending champion: Ko Ping-chung (Chinese Taipei)

Final
- Champion: Eklent Kaçi (ALB)
- Runner-up: Naoyuki Ōi (JPN)
- Score: 10–6

The 2021 WPA World Ten-ball Championship was a professional pool tournament for the discipline of ten-ball organised by the World Pool-Billiard Association (WPA) and CueSports International. It was the sixth WPA World Ten-ball Championship and the first since 2019, as the 2020 edition was canceled due to the COVID-19 pandemic.

The tournament began with 64 players in a double-elimination bracket (playing race-to-8 matches) until 16 players remained, at which point it changed to a single-elimination format (playing race-to-10 matches). Eklent Kaçi of Albania defeated Naoyuki Ōi of Japan in the championship match.
