= 2009 WPA Women's World Ten-ball Championship =

2009 Yalin WPA Women's World Ten-ball Championship
Tournament information
- Dates: 2–6 June 2009
- Venue: SM North Edsa
- City: Quezon City
- Country: Philippines
- Organisation: World Pool-Billiard Association
- Format: Double elimination / single elimination
- Discipline: Ten-ball
- Total prize fund: $75,000
- Winner's share: $20,000

Final
- Champion: Rubilen Amit (PHI)
- Runner-up: Liu Shin-mei (TPE)
- Score: 10–4

The 2009 Yalin WPA Women's World Ten-ball Championship was the inaugural professional world championship for women in the discipline of ten-ball pool. The event took place from 2 to 6 June 2009 at the SM North Edsa Mall in Quezon City, Philippines. Sponsored by Yalin Tables, it was the first time the WPA sanctioned a world-level ten-ball event specifically for women. Rubilen Amit won the event, defeating Liu Shin-mei 10–4 in the final.

== Prize fund ==
The total prize fund for the event was $75,000, with the winner receiving $20,000.

Position	Prize money
Winner	$20,000
Runner-up	$10,000
Semi-finalist	$5,000
Quarter-finalist	$3,000
9th–16th Place	$1,500
17th–24th Place	$1,000
Total	$75,000

== Knockout stage ==
The knockout round was played with 24 remaining players. Matches in the round of 24 and 16 were race to 8 racks, later rounds race to 9, while the final was a race to 10. Players in bold denote match winners.

Round of 24
**Cha Yu-ram (KOR)**	**8**
Gillian Go (TPE)	3
**Jasmin Ouschan (AUT)**	**8**
Angeline Ticoalu (IND)	3
**Charlene Chai (SGP)**	**8**
Kim Ga-young (KOR)	6
**Chou Chieh-yu (TPE)**	**8**
Apsra Punhoo	3
**Lim Yun-mi (KOR)**	**8**
Akio Otani (JAP)	5
**Lin Yuan-chun (TPE)**	**8**
Chihiro Kawahara (JAP)	4
**Tamara Rademakers (NED)**	**8**
Veronika Hubrtová (CZE)	5
**Tan Ho-yun (TPE)**	**8**
Julie Kelly (IRL)	3

Round of 16
Allison Fisher (GBR)	7
**Cha Yu-ram (KOR)**	**8**
**Jasmin Ouschan (AUT)**	**8**
Miyuki Kuribayashi (JPN)	5
**Liu Shin-mei (TPE)**	**8**
Charlene Chai (SGP)	1
**Kelly Fisher (GBR)**	**8**
Chou Chieh-yu (TPE)	2
**Karen Corr (IRL)**	**8**
Lim Yun-mi (KOR)	6
Lin Yuan-chun (TPE)	7
**Akimi Kajitani (JPN)**	**8**
**Jeanette Lee (USA)**	**8**
Tamara Rademakers (NED)	3
**Rubilen Amit (PHI)**	**8**
Tan Ho-yun (TPE)	3

Quarter-finals
Cha Yu-ram (KOR)	7
**Jasmin Ouschan (AUT)**	**9**
**Liu Shin-mei (TPE)**	**9**
Kelly Fisher (GBR)	8
Karen Corr (IRL)	7
**Akimi Kajitani (JPN)**	**9**
Jeanette Lee (USA)	8
**Rubilen Amit (PHI)**	**9**

Semi-finals
Jasmin Ouschan (AUT)	6
**Liu Shin-mei (TPE)**	**9**
Akimi Kajitani (JPN)	6
**Rubilen Amit (PHI)**	**9**

Final
Liu Shin-mei (TPE)	4
**Rubilen Amit (PHI)**	**10**
