= Ten-ball (disambiguation) =

Ten-ball (or ten-ball, 10 ball, 10-ball and other variant spellings) is a pool (pocket billiards) game, played with ten object balls, of which the 10 ball is the game-winning ball. It may also refer to:

- 10 ball, the pool (pocket billiards) ball numbered "10", and colored with a blue stripe
- 10-ball, a ten-dimensional n-ball in mathematics
