= Billiards and snooker at the 2019 SEA Games =

- Venue: Manila Hotel Tent
- Location: Manila
- Date: 3–10 December

The billiards and snooker competitions at the 2019 SEA Games in Philippines were held at the Manila Hotel Tent.

== Medal table ==
* Host nation (Philippines)

Rank	Nation	Gold	Silver	Bronze	Total
1	Philippines*	4	3	5	12
2	Myanmar	2	1	3	6
3	Vietnam	1	3	1	5
4	Singapore	1	1	6	8
5	Malaysia	1	1	0	2
6	Thailand	1	0	2	3
7	Indonesia	0	1	2	3
8	Laos	0	0	1	1
Totals (8 entries)		10	10	20	40

== Medalists ==
=== Carom ===
Event	Gold	Silver	Bronze
Men's 1-cushion carom	Ngô Đình Nại; Vietnam	Phạm Cảnh Phúc; Vietnam	Efren Reyes; Philippines
Men's 1-cushion carom	Ngô Đình Nại; Vietnam	Phạm Cảnh Phúc; Vietnam	Francisco Dela Cruz; Philippines

=== Pool ===
Event	Gold	Silver	Bronze
Men's 9-ball pool singles	Phone Myint Kyaw; Myanmar	Đỗ Thế Kiên; Vietnam	Aloysius Yapp; Singapore
Men's 9-ball pool singles	Phone Myint Kyaw; Myanmar	Đỗ Thế Kiên; Vietnam	Toh Lian Han; Singapore
Men's 9-ball pool doubles	Myanmar; Phone Myint Kyaw; Aung Moe Thu	Singapore; Toh Lian Han; Aloysius Yapp	Philippines; Jeffrey Ignacio; Warren Kiamco
Men's 9-ball pool doubles	Myanmar; Phone Myint Kyaw; Aung Moe Thu	Singapore; Toh Lian Han; Aloysius Yapp	Philippines; Carlo Biado; Johann Chua
Men's 10-ball pool singles	Dennis Orcollo; Philippines	Đỗ Thế Kiên; Vietnam	Ismail Kadir; Indonesia
Men's 10-ball pool singles	Dennis Orcollo; Philippines	Đỗ Thế Kiên; Vietnam	Aloysius Yapp; Singapore
Women's 9-ball pool singles	Rubilen Amit; Philippines	Chezka Centeno; Philippines	Jessica Tan; Singapore
Women's 9-ball pool singles	Rubilen Amit; Philippines	Chezka Centeno; Philippines	Vutthiphan Kongkaket; Thailand
Women's 9-ball pool doubles	Philippines; Chezka Centeno; Rubilen Amit	Indonesia; Fathrah Masum; Nony Krystianti Andilah	Singapore; Jessica Tan; Suvene Ng
Women's 9-ball pool doubles	Philippines; Chezka Centeno; Rubilen Amit	Indonesia; Fathrah Masum; Nony Krystianti Andilah	Indonesia; Angeline Magdalena Ticoalu; Silviana Lu
Women's 10-ball pool singles	Chezka Centeno; Philippines	Rubilen Amit; Philippines	A Mi Aung; Myanmar
Women's 10-ball pool singles	Chezka Centeno; Philippines	Rubilen Amit; Philippines	Thandar Maung; Myanmar

=== Snooker ===
Event	Gold	Silver	Bronze
Men's English billiard singles	Peter Gilchrist; Singapore	Nay Thway Oo; Myanmar	Yuttapop Pakpoj; Thailand
Men's English billiard singles	Peter Gilchrist; Singapore	Nay Thway Oo; Myanmar	Trần Lê Anh Tuấn; Vietnam
Men's snooker singles	Kritsanut Lertsattayathorn; Thailand	Moh Keen Hoo; Malaysia	Jefrey Roda; Philippines
Men's snooker singles	Kritsanut Lertsattayathorn; Thailand	Moh Keen Hoo; Malaysia	Siththideth Sakbieng; Laos
Men's snooker doubles	Malaysia; Moh Keen Hoo; Lim Kok Leong	Philippines; Alvin Barbero; Jefrey Roda	Singapore; Kingsley Ang; Marvin Lim
Men's snooker doubles	Malaysia; Moh Keen Hoo; Lim Kok Leong	Philippines; Alvin Barbero; Jefrey Roda	Myanmar; Ko Htet; Thet Min Lin

== Results ==
=== Men's 9-Ball Pool Singles ===
Last 18

Player	Score	Player
Phone Myint Kyaw (MYA)	9-4	Muhammad Azim Abu Bakar (BRU)
Aung Moe Thu (MYA)	6-9	Toh Lian Han (SGP)

Last 16
Hongsavady Vongxay (LAO)	8
Phone Myint Kyaw (MYA)	9
Duong Quoc Hoang (VIE)	9
Muhammad Almie Muhamad Yakup (MAS)	2
Tanut Makkamontree (THA)	4
Aloysius Yapp (SGP)	9
Dennis Orcollo (PHI)	9
Sahroni (INA)	0
Kok Jken Yung (MAS)	4
Do The Kien (VIE)	9
Ahmad Taufiq M Murni (BRU)	9
Obmalay Anongsak (LAO)	7
Warren Kiamco (PHI)	9
Amnuayporn Chotipong (THA)	7
Toh Lian Han (SGP)	9
Jefry Zen (INA)	5

Quarterfinals
Phone Myint Kyaw (MYA)	9
Duong Quoc Hoang (VIE)	7
Aloysius Yapp (SGP)	9
Dennis Orcollo (PHI)	4
Do The Kien (VIE)	9
Ahmad Taufiq M Murni (BRU)	7
Warren Kiamco (PHI)	4
Toh Lian Han (SGP)	9

Semifinals
Phone Myint Kyaw (MYA)	9
Aloysius Yapp (SGP)	6
Do The Kien (VIE)	9
Toh Lian Han (SGP)	3

Finals
Phone Myint Kyaw (MYA)	9
Do The Kien (VIE)	4

=== Men's 9-Ball Pool Doubles ===
Last 16
Ahmad Taufiq M Murni (BRU); Muhammad Azim Abu Bakar (BRU)	9
Sahroni (INA); Andri Andri (INA)	7
Jeffrey Ignacio (PHI); Warren Kiamco (PHI)	9
Darryl Chia (MAS); Ibrahim Amir (MAS)	3
Tanut Makkamontree (THA); Amnuayporn Chotipong (THA)	9
Goh Chin Teck (SGP); Sharik Aslam Sayed (SGP)	6
Kok Jken Yung (MAS); Muhammad Almie Muhamad Yakup (MAS)	2
Carlo Biado (PHI); Johann Chua (PHI)	9
Anongsak Obmalay (LAO); Hongsavady Vongxay (LAO)	6
Jefry Zen (INA); Irsal Afrinneza Nasution (INA)	9
Supat Wattanawonna (THA); Sompol Saetang (THA)	4
Do The Kien (VIE); Duong Quoc Hoang (VIE)	9

Quarterfinals
Ahmad Taufiq M Murni (BRU); Muhammad Azim Abu Bakar (BRU)	8
Jeffrey Ignacio (PHI); Warren Kiamco (PHI)	9
Tanut Makkamontree (THA); Amnuayporn Chotipong (THA)	7
Aung Moe Thu (MYA); Phone Myint Kyaw (MYA)	9
Carlo Biado (PHI); Johann Chua (PHI)	9
Jefry Zen (INA); Irsal Afrinneza Nasution (INA)	3
Toh Lian Han (SGP); Aloysius Yapp (SGP)	9
Do The Kien (VIE); Duong Quoc Hoang (VIE)	5

Semifinal
Jeffrey Ignacio (PHI); Warren Kiamco (PHI)	8
Aung Moe Thu (MYA); Phone Myint Kyaw (MYA)	9
Carlo Biado (PHI); Johann Chua (PHI)	3
Toh Lian Han (SGP); Aloysius Yapp (SGP)	9

Finals
Aung Moe Thu (MYA); Phone Myint Kyaw (MYA)	9
Toh Lian Han (SGP); Aloysius Yapp (SGP)	4

=== Men's 10-Ball Singles ===
Last 16
Aloysius Yapp (SGP)	9
Ibrahim Amir (MAS)	4
Thaw Zin Htet (MYA)	3
Amnuayporn Chotipong (THA)	9
Anongsak Obmalay (LAO)	2
Duong Quoc Hoang (VIE)	9
Dennis Orcollo (PHI)	9
Muhammad Azim Abu Bakar (BRU)	4
Carlo Biado (PHI)	9
Darryl Chia (MAS)	4
Ismail Kadir (INA)	9
Phone Myint Kyaw (MYA)	4
Tanut Makkamontree (THA)	3
Sharik Aslam Sayed (SGP)	9
Ahmad Taufiq M Murni (BRU)	2
Do The Kien (VIE)	9

Quarterfinals
Aloysius Yapp (SGP)	9
Amnuayporn Chotipong (THA)	6
Duong Quoc Hoang (VIE)	5
Dennis Orcollo (PHI)	9
Carlo Biado (PHI)	2
Ismail Kadir (INA)	9
Sharik Aslam Sayed (SGP)	5
Do The Kien (VIE)	9

Semifinals
Aloysius Yapp (SGP)	7
Dennis Orcollo (PHI)	9
Ismail Kadir (INA)	3
Do The Kien (VIE)	9

Finals
Dennis Orcollo (PHI)	9
Do The Kien (VIE)	8

=== Men's Snooker Singles ===
Last 16
Sakbieng Siththideth (LAO)	4
Alvin Barbero (PHI)	0
Kieu Thien Khoi (VIE)	3
Lim Chun Kiat (SGP)	4
Kritsanut Lertsattayathorn (THA)	4
Yoni Rachmanto (INA)	2
Lim Kok Leong (MAS)	4
Htet Ko (MYA)	1
Daophachan Phoutthabandit (LAO)	1
Gebby Putra (INA)	4
Win Ko Ko (MYA)	1
Moh Keen Hoo (MAS)	4
Mau Tram (VIE)	0
Kingsley Tian Yi Ang (SGP)	4
Jefrey Roda (PHI)	4
Kieu Thien Khoi (VIE)	3

Quarterfinals
Siththideth Sakbieng (LAO)	4
Lim Chun Kiat (SGP)	3
Kritsanut Lertsattayathorn (THA)	4
Lim Kok Leong (MAS)	2
Gebby Putra (INA)	3
Moh Keen Hoo (MAS)	4
Kingsley Tian Yi Ang (SGP)	1
Jefrey Roda (PHI)	4

Semifinals
Siththideth Sakbieng (LAO)	3
Kritsanut Lertsattayathorn (THA)	4
Moh Keen Hoo (MAS)	4
Jefrey Roda (PHI)	1

Finals
Kritsanut Lertsattayathorn (THA)	4
Moh Keen Hoo (MAS)	2

=== Men's Snooker Doubles ===
Last 16
Iputu Wirawan (INA); Dhendy Krhistanto (INA)	1
Basil Alshajjar (PHI); Michael Mengorio (PHI)	3
Minalavong Suriya (LAO); Sakbieng Siththideth (LAO)	3
Kritsanut Lertsattayathorn (THA); Poramin Danjirakul (THA)	0
Kieu Thien Khoi (VIE); Tram Mau (VIE)	0
Moh Keen Hoo (MAS); Lim Kok Leong (MAS)	3
Mohd Reza Hassan (MAS); Chung Leong Loh (MAS)	0
Gebby Putra (INA); Yoni Rachmanto (INA)	3
Anoulouth Khounpanya (LAO); Phoutthabandit Daophachan (LAO)	1
Alvin Barbero (PHI); Jefrey Roda (PHI)	3

Quarterfinals
Kingsley Tian Yi Ang (SGP); Lim Chun Kiat (SGP)	3
Basil Alshajjar (PHI); Michael Mengorio (PHI)	0
Minalavong Suriya (LAO); Sakbieng Siththideth (LAO)	2
Moh Keen Hoo (MAS); Lim Kok Leong (MAS)	3
Ko Htet (MYA); Thet Min Lin (MYA)	3
Gebby Putra (INA); Yoni Rachmanto (INA)	2
Alvin Barbero (PHI); Jefrey Roda (PHI)	3
Passakorn Suwannawat (THA); Thanawat Tirapongpaiboon (THA)	0

Semifinals
Kingsley Tian Yi Ang (SGP); Lim Chun Kiat (SGP)	1
Moh Keen Hoo (MAS); Lim Kok Leong (MAS)	3
Ko Htet (MYA); Thet Min Lin (MYA)	0
Alvin Barbero (PHI); Jefrey Roda (PHI)	3

Finals
Moh Keen Hoo (MAS); Lim Kok Leong (MAS)	3
Alvin Barbero (PHI); Jefrey Roda (PHI)	1

=== Men's English Billiards Singles ===
Last 16
Marlando Sihombing (INA)	3
Adwin Teh (MAS)	1
Luis Saberdo (PHI)	2
Nam Pham Hoai (VIE)	3
Yuttapop Pakpoj (THA)	3
Chit Ko Ko (MYA)	1
Benjamin Guevarra (PHI)	2
Tran Leanh Tuan (VIE)	3
Jaka Kurniawan (INA)	3
Roslan Yurnalis (MAS)	1

Quarterfinals
Peter Gilchrist (SGP)	3
Marlando Sihombing (INA)	1
Nam Pham Hoai (VIE)	2
Yuttapop Pakpoj (THA)	3
Praprut Chaithanasakun (THA)	2
Tran Leanh Tuan (VIE)	3
Jaka Kurniawan (INA)	0
Nay Thway Oo (MYA)	3

Semifinals
Peter Gilchrist (SGP)	3
Yuttapop Pakpoj (THA)	1
Tran Leanh Tuan (VIE)	0
Nay Thway Oo (MYA)	3

Finals
Peter Gilchrist (SGP)	3
Nay Thway Oo (MYA)	0

=== Men's 1-Carom Cushion ===
Quarterfinals		Semifinals		Finals
		Ngo Dinh Nai (VIE)	100
Thongchai Punyawee (THA)	37	Efren Reyes (PHI)	14
Efren Reyes (PHI)	100			Ngo Dinh Nai (VIE)	100
Tan Kiong An (INA)	31			Canh Phuc Pham (VIE)	92
Canh Phuc Pham (VIE)	100	Canh Phuc Pham (VIE)	100
Yuttapop Pakpoj (THA)	30	Francisco Dela Cruz (PHI)	55
Francisco Dela Cruz (PHI)	100

=== Women's 9-Ball Singles ===
Last 16
Thi Ngoc Le Doan (VIE)	0
Angeline Ticoalu (INA)	7
Aye Mi Aung (MYA)	2
Jessica Tan Hui Ming (SGP)	7
Sasiwimon Wannaprathip (THA)	7
Suhana Dewi Sabtu (MAS)	1
Klaudia Djajalie (MAS)	6
Bui Xuan Vang (VIE)	7
Thandar Maung (MYA)	4
Vutthiphan Kongkaket (THA)	7
Suvene Ng Yi Huai (SGP)	6
Fathrah Masum (INA)	7

Quarterfinals
Chezka Centeno (PHI)	7
Angeline Ticoalu (INA)	0
Jessica Tan Hui Ming (SGP)	7
Sasiwimon Wannaprathip (THA)	5
Bui Xuan Vang (VIE)	4
Vutthiphan Kongkaket (THA)	7
Fathrah Masum (INA)	3
Rubilen Amit (PHI)	7

Semifinals
Chezka Centeno (PHI)	7
Jessica Tan Hui Ming (SGP)	1
Vutthiphan Kongkake (THA)	2
Rubilen Amit (PHI)	7

Finals
Chezka Centeno (PHI)	3
Rubilen Amit (PHI)	7

=== Women's 9-Ball Doubles ===
Last 16
Lim Siew Boon (MAS); Wong Poi Sei (MAS)	7
Floriza Andal (PHI); Iris Rañola (PHI)	5
Aye Mi Aung (MYA); Thandar Maung (MYA)	3
Suhana Dewi Sabtu (MAS); Klaudia Djajalie (MAS)	7
Chezka Centeno (PHI); Rubilen Amit (PHI)	7
Bui Xuan Vang (VIE); Thi Ngoc Le Doan (VIE)	4

Quarterfinals
Angeline Ticoalu (INA); Silviana Lu (INA)	7
Lim Siew Boon (MAS); Wong Poi Sei (MAS)	5
Jessica Tan Hui Ming (SGP); Suvene Ng Yi Huai (SGP)	7
Waratthanun Sukritthanes (THA); Siripaporn Nuanthakhamjan (THA)	6
Fathrah Masum (INA); Nony Andilah (INA)	7
Suhana Dewi Sabtu (MAS); Klaudia Djajalie (MAS)	1
Chezka Centeno (PHI); Rubilen Amit (PHI)	7
Vutthiphan Kongkaket (THA); Sasiwimon Wannaprathip (THA)	6

Semifinals
Angeline Ticoalu (INA); Silviana Lu (INA)	7
Jessica Tan Hui Ming (SGP); Suvene Ng Yi Huai (SGP)	3
Fathrah Masum (INA); Nony Andilah (INA)	3
Chezka Centeno (PHI); Rubilen Amit (PHI)	7

Finals
Angeline Ticoalu (INA); Silviana Lu (INA)	0
Chezka Centeno (PHI); Rubilen Amit (PHI)	7

=== Women's 10-Ball Singles ===
Last 16
Waratthanun Sukritthanes (THA)	7
Lim Siew Boon (MAS)	6
Thi Ngoc Le Doan (VIE)	6
Jessica Tan Hui Ming (SGP)	7
Silviana Lu (INA)	6
Aye Mi Aung (MYA)	7
Rubilen Amit (PHI)	7
Siripaporn Nuanthakhamjan (THA)	5
Bui Xuan Vang (VIE)	7
Wong Poi Sei (MAS)	0
Suvene Ng Yi Huai (SGP)	3
Nony Andilah (INA)	7

Quarterfinals
Chezka Centeno (PHI)	7
Waratthanun Sukritthanes (THA)	3
Jessica Tan Hui Ming (SGP)	1
Aye Mi Aung (MYA)	7
Rubilen Amit (PHI)	7
Bui Xuan Vang (VIE)	1
Nony Andilah (INA)	6
Thandar Maung (MYA)	7

Semifinals
Chezka Centeno (PHI)	7
Aye Mi Aung (MYA)	4
Rubilen Amit (PHI)	7
Thandar Maung (MYA)	2

Finals
Chezka Centeno (PHI)	7
Rubilen Amit (PHI)	3
