= Savannah Easton =

American pool player (born 2010)

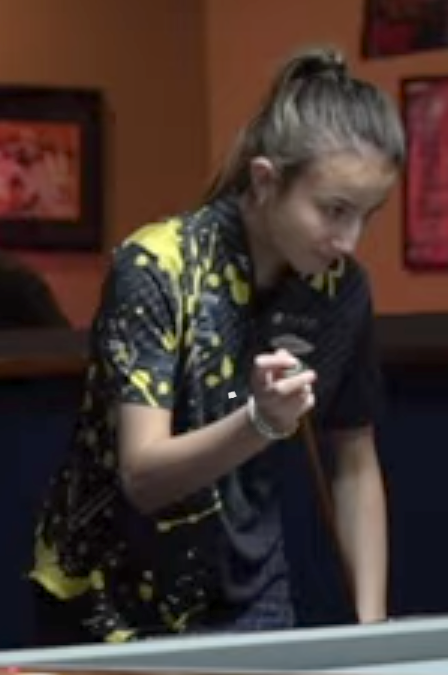
- In a match in 2024

Personal information
- Nickname: The Roadrunner
- Born: February 8, 2010 (age 16) Las Vegas, Nevada, U.S.
- Website: https://www.roadrunnerindustries.com/

Pool career
Medal record
Women's cue sports
Representing United States

Savannah Easton (born February 8, 2010) is an American professional billiards player who since January 2024 (Note: In January 2024 she was 13 and turned 14 the next month, February 2024.) has been ranked the 10th best female billiards player in the world by the Women's Professional Billiard Association (WPBA), including youths and adults. She acquired the billiards nickname of "The Roadrunner" as early as age 13. She was so small at the time that the letters "R O A D R U N N E R" could not all be seen on the back of her billiards jersey. She is recognized as a WPBA Elite Pro.

== Early life ==
Easton was born in Las Vegas, Nevada to Larry and Tiffany Easton and still lives there. She has an older brother named Cameron. She began playing professionally in 2022. Her first competitive event was the 2021 Billiard Education Foundation (BEF) Nationals in Las Vegas in which she went two and out. She told her mother that she would win that event the following year, 2022, and she did so. She enjoys other sports such as soccer, flag football, baseball, ice hockey, and volleyball; performing well in all of them. Sofia Mast, two years older than Easton and from Florida, has played Easton about 50 times in the last four years and a rivalry has developed between them, with the matches always being close.

In billiards, she plays eight-ball, nine-ball, ten-ball, and straight pool. She is a seven-time junior national champion in those events and is a national Master's champion in eight-ball.

== Titles and achievements ==
- 7x Billiard Education Foundation (BEF) Jr Nationals Champion
- 2022 WPBA Sledgehammer Open- 5th place
- 2024 WPA World Junior Silver Medalist
- 2024 WPBA Borderline Brunswick Invitational - 4th place
- 2024 WPBA Capital City Invitational- 5th place
- Ultimate Pool Arizona Open Women's & Juniors Champion
- 2025 UPUSA Arizona Junior Open, 1st place
- 2025 Saigon Women's Nine-ball Open, 9th place
- 2025 USA National Pool Women's Ten-ball Championship, 3rd place
- 2025 UPUSA Arizona Women's Open, 1st place
- 2025 UPUSA Iowa Open Jr Div., 1st place
- 2025 UPUSA Iowa Open Mixed Pairs Div., 1st place
- 2025 Master's USA National Pool Women's Eight-ball Championship, 1st place
