= Nine-ball at the 2009 World Games – women's singles =

Nine-ball women's singles at the 2009 World Games
- Venue: Chung Cheng Martial Arts Stadium, Kaohsiung, Taiwan
- Dates: 22–26 July 2009
- Competitors: 16 from 11 nations

Medalists
| gold medal | (United Kingdom) Allison Fisher |
| silver medal | (Austria) Jasmin Ouschan |
| bronze medal | (Chinese Taipei) Lin Yuan-chun |

The women's singles nine-ball competition at the 2009 World Games took place from 22 to 26 July 2009 at the Chung Cheng Martial Arts Stadium in Kaohsiung, Taiwan.

== Last 16 ==
| Jasmin Ouschan (Austria) | 9–4 | (Spain) Amalia Matas |
| Carlynn Andrea Sanchez Torrealba (Venezuela) | 4–9 | (United States) Jeanette Lee |
| Ga-young Kim (South Korea) | 6–9 | (Norway) Line Kjorsvik |
| Yukiko Oi (Japan) | 5–9 | (Chinese Taipei) Shu Han Chang |
| Allison Fisher (United Kingdom) | 9–3 | (South Africa) Aspra Indurjeeth Panchoo |
| Akio Otani (Japan) | 4–9 | (Chinese Taipei) Liu Shin-Mei |
| Vivian Villareal (United States) | 9–5 | (Netherlands) Estelle Bijnen |
| Pei Chen Tsai (Chinese Taipei) | 2–9 | (Chinese Taipei) Lin Yuan-chun |

== Last 8 ==
Quarter-finals
(Austria) Jasmin Ouschan | 9
(United States) Jeanette Lee | 5
(Norway) Line Kjorsvik | 8
(Chinese Taipei) Shu Han Chang | 9
(United Kingdom) Allison Fisher | 9
(Chinese Taipei) Liu Shin-Mei | 5
(United States) Vivian Villareal | 1
(Chinese Taipei) Lin Yuan-chun | 9

Semi-finals
(Austria) Jasmin Ouschan | 9
(Chinese Taipei) Shu Han Chang | 2
(United Kingdom) Allison Fisher | 9
(Chinese Taipei) Lin Yuan-chun | 5

Gold medal match
(Austria) Jasmin Ouschan | 8
(United Kingdom) Allison Fisher | 9
Bronze medal match
(Chinese Taipei) Shu Han Chang | 5
(Chinese Taipei) Lin Yuan-chun | 9
