= Rubilen Amit =

Filipino pool player (born 1981)

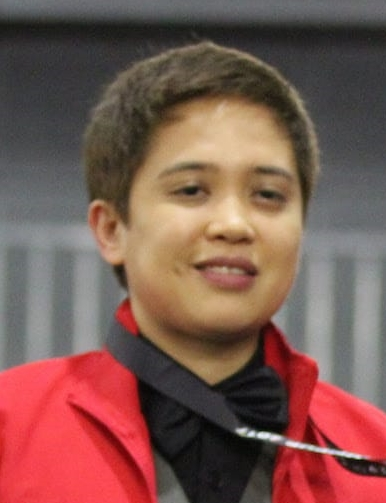
- Amit in 2017

Personal information
- Born: October 3, 1981 (age 45) Mandaue, Cebu, Philippines

Sport
- Country: Philippines
- Sport: Snooker
Medal record
Representing Philippines
Women's Eight-ball
Event	1st	2nd	3rd
Asian Indoor Games	-	1	1
Southeast Asian Games	10	5	1
Total	10	6	2
WPA Women's World Ten-ball Championship
Winner	2013	Champion
Winner	2009	Champion
Bronze medal – third place	2010	3rd
WPA Women's World Nine-ball Championship
Winner	2024	Champion
Silver medal – second place	2007	Runner-Up
Bronze medal – third place	2018	3rd
Bronze medal – third place	2019	3rd
Southeast Asian Games
Gold medal – first place	2005 Manila	Singles
Gold medal – first place	2009 Vientiane	Singles
Bronze medal – third place	2007 Nakhon Ratchasima	Singles
Women's Nine-ball
Southeast Asian Games
Gold medal – first place	2005 Manila	Singles
Gold medal – first place	2007 Nakhon Ratchasima	Singles
Gold medal – first place	2009 Vientiane	Singles
Gold medal – first place	2019 Philippines	Singles
Gold medal – first place	2019 Philippines	Doubles
Gold medal – first place	2021 Hanoi	Singles
Silver medal – second place	2011 Palembang	Singles
Silver medal – second place	2013 Naypyidaw	Singles
Silver medal – second place	2015 Singapore	Singles
Silver medal – second place	2017 Kuala Lumpur	Singles
Women's Ten-ball
Asian Indoor-Martial Arts Games
Silver medal – second place	2017 Ashgabat	Singles
Bronze medal – third place	2013 Incheon	Singles
Southeast Asian Games
Gold medal – first place	2013 Naypyidaw	Singles
Gold medal – first place	2021 Hanoi	Singles
Silver medal – second place	2019 Philippines	Singles

Rubilen "Bingkay" Amit (born October 3, 1981) is a Filipino female professional pool player from Mandaue, Cebu. Amit is a three-time world champion. She won the WPA Women's World Ten-ball Championship in 2009 and 2013 and WPA Women's World Nine-ball Championship in 2024. She is also the second Filipino player behind Carlo Biado to win both ten-ball and nine-ball championships.

== Biography ==
Rubilen Amit was born in Mandaue, Cebu. Amit began playing during her teens, often tagging along with her father Bobby at the Super Bowl in Makati. In college, she studied accountancy at the University of Santo Tomas. She participated in and won the 2000 and 2001 College of Commerce and Business Administration's billiards tournaments. After graduating in 2004, Amit worked as a call center agent for a year. In 2005, she was accepted to the Philippine Pool National Team. However, in early 2013, Amit, along with other top Filipino pool players, was removed from the national team due to a controversial reorganization of the national team by the Billiards and Snooker Congress of the Philippines.

== Career ==
In 2009, Amit became the first Filipina to become a world pool champion after claiming her first WPA Women's World Ten-ball Championship title, outclassing two-time Women's World Nine-ball champion Liu Shin-mei of Taiwan, 10–4 at the SM North in Quezon City, Manila Philippines. Also in 2009, Amit partnered Efren "Bata" Reyes to win the inauragral World Mixed Doubles Classic defeating Korean team of Charlie Williams and Eun Ji Park with a 9–7 score held at the Nuvo City Lifestyle Center in Libis, Quezon City. She also won the 2011 event once again partnering Reyes. The pair beat the American pair of Johnny Archer and Jeannette Lee 10–6 in the final at Shopping Center in Hangzhou, China.

In 2013, Amit won her second WPA Women's World Ten-ball Championship, defeating Kelly Fisher of Great Britain 10–7 in the final at Newport Mall in Pasay City, Philippines. She became the first female pool player to win two ten-ball championships after her victory in 2009.

In 2022, the trio of Amit, Carlo Biado and Johann Chua emerged triumphant in the 2022 WPA World Teams Championship after sweeping Great Britain, 3–0, in the final in Klagenfurt, Austria. Great Britain was composed of Kelly Fisher, Jayson Shaw, and Darren Appleton. With the win, they gave the Philippines its first World Team Ten-ball title after runner-up finishes in 2010 and 2014.

Amit won the 2024 WPA Women's World Nine-ball Championship in Hamilton, New Zealand, defeating Chen Siming of China 3 sets to 1 (1–4), (4–2), (4–2) and (4–3). She took home the top prize of $50,000 (2.9m PHP).

Amit's victory made her the first Filipina pool player to win the women's world nine-ball title and the second Filipino pool player, after Carlo Biado, to win both the ten-ball and nine-ball world championships.

Amit is a multiple-time SEA Games gold medalists, winning 10 golds, 5 silvers and 1 bronze. She also won 1 silver and 1 bronze at Asian Indoor Games.

== Recognition ==
In 2019, Amit was recognized as one of the Top 100 Cebuano personalities by The Freeman, Cebu's longest-running newspaper. She was recognized alongside Tomas Osmeña, Resil Mojares, and Max Surban as part of the centennial anniversary of the local newspaper.

== Titles & Achievements ==
- 2026 WPA World Mixed Teams Ten-ball Championship
- 2025 Predator Las Vegas Open Ten-ball
- 2025 Predator Women's Challenge of Champions
- 2024 WPA Women's World Nine-ball Championship
- 2022 WPA World Mixed Teams Ten-ball Championship
- 2021 Southeast Asian Games Nine-ball Singles
- 2021 Southeast Asian Games Ten-ball Singles
- 2019 Southeast Asian Games Nine-ball Doubles
- 2019 Southeast Asian Games Nine-ball Singles
- 2015 Queens Cup
- 2013 Southeast Asian Games Ten-ball Singles
- 2013 WPA Women's World Ten-ball Championship
- 2013 Queens Cup
- 2011 World Mixed Doubles Classic (with Efren Reyes)
- 2009 Philippine Sportsman of the Year
- 2009 WPA Women's World Ten-ball Championship
- 2009 Southeast Asian Games Eight-ball Singles
- 2009 Southeast Asian Games Nine-ball Singles
- 2009 World Mixed Doubles Classic (with Efren Reyes)
- 2007 Southeast Asian Games Nine-ball Singles
- 2005 Southeast Asian Games Eight-ball Singles
- 2005 Southeast Asian Games Nine-ball Singles
