= Chou Chieh-yu =

Taiwanese pool player

Chou Chieh-yu is a Taiwanese professional pool player. She is a three-time world champion, having won the WPA Women's World Nine-ball Championship twice in 2023 and 2026 and the 2022 WPA World Ten-ball Championship.

Chou is one of the most successful players in the history of the Amway Cup, winning the title three times, in 2009, 2012, and 2014. She also secured a gold medal at the 2013 World Games. In 2023, she became only the third woman, after Kelly Fisher and Ga-young Kim, to hold both the 9-ball and 10-ball world titles simultaneously.

== Titles & Achievements ==
- 2026 World Nine-ball Championship
- 2026 WPBA U.S. Open 9-Ball Championship
- 2026 WPBA Classic Billiards Players Championship
- 2025 WPBA Olhausen Raxx Mezz Invitational
- 2024 WPBA Soaring Eagle Masters
- 2024 ACBS Asian Nine-ball Championship
- 2024 Predator Women's Showdown
- 2024 Apex Mixed Doubles Invitational - with (Chang Jung-lin)
- 2023 Women's Wisconsin Open 2023
- 2023 World Nine-ball Championship
- 2022 World Ten-ball Championship
- 2014 Amway Cup
- 2013 World Games Nine-ball Singles
- 2012 Amway Cup
- 2012 All Japan Championship
- 2010 Japan Open 9-Ball
- 2009 Amway Cup
