= Women's Professional Billiard Association =

Women's pool tour in the United States

- Abbreviation: WPBA
- Formation: 1976
- Type: Professional sports organization
- Headquarters: United States
- Region served: Worldwide (primarily United States)
- Website: https://wpba.com

The Women's Professional Billiard Association (WPBA) is a professional women's pool tour and sports organization based in the United States. It was founded in 1976 as the Women's Professional Billiard Alliance by players Madelyn Whitlow and Palmer Byrd, and by Larry Miller (editor of the National Billiard News) to provide a structured competitive circuit for female billiards players and has since become one of the leading tour organizations in women's professional pool. The WPBA organizes ranked tour events, maintains player standings, and promotes women's participation in cue sports.

== History ==
The WPBA began in 1976 as the Women's Professional Billiard Alliance, formed by female players including Madelyn Whitlow and Palmer Byrd along with Larry Miller, editor of the National Billiard News. This group sought to create a professional tour and greater recognition for women in the sport.

In its early years, the WPBA helped formalize competitive opportunities for women players and established a tour that drew talent from across the United States and internationally. The organization later expanded its activities to include major championship events such as the U.S. Open Nine‑Ball Championship and the WPBA Masters.

== Tour and Events ==
The WPBA organizes an annual tour season featuring ranked events. Player performances are tracked in year‑end rankings such as the “Top 32 Players” list, which highlights leading competitors based on their results throughout the season.

In recent years, the WPBA has introduced events like the SemiPro series to provide competitive opportunities for emerging players and bridge the gap between regional competition and the main professional tour.

== Impact and Legacy ==
The WPBA has played a central role in the development of professional women's cue sports in the U.S. and internationally by organizing competitive tours, showcasing top female talent, and promoting the sport through events, rankings, and media coverage.

== COVID-19 ==
Like in many sports organizations, COVID-19 caused a significant decline and restructuring in the WPBA.

== Top 32 Players (2026) ==
January 1, 2026 Rankings:

1. (Russia) Kristina Tkach
2. (Germany) Pia Filler
3. (Belarus) Margarita Fefilova
4. (Bulgaria) Kristina Zlateva
5. (England) Kelly Fisher
6. (Taiwan) Wei Tzu-chien
7. (United States) Kaylee McIntosh
8. (United States) Sofia Mast
9. (United States) Savannah Easton
10. (England) Allison Fisher
11. (United States) Monica Webb
12. (Taiwan) (Australia) Hung Meng-hsia
13. (United States) April Larson
14. (Canada) Brittany Bryant
15. (Canada) Véronique Ménard
16. (United States) Kennedy Meyman
17. (United States) Janet Atwell
18. (United States) Caroline Pao
19. (United States) Ashley Rice
20. (Turkey) Eylül Kibaroğlu
21. (United States) Briana Miller
22. (United States) Ashley Benoit
23. (United States) Tina Larsen
24. (United States) LoreeJon Brown
25. (United States) Susan Williams
26. (United States) Olivia Cheng
27. (United States) Teruko Macklin
28. (Spain) Mayte Ropero
29. (United States) Lonnie Fox‑Raymond
30. (United States) Emily Duddy
31. (United States) Stephanie Mitchell
32. (United States) Angela Janic

== Top 32 Players (2019) ==
2019 End of Year Rankings:

1. (England) Allison Fisher
2. (Canada) Brittany Bryant
3. (United States) Jennifer Barretta
4. (Taiwan) Wei Tzu-chien
5. (England) Kelly Fisher
6. (Norway) Line Kjørsvik
7. (China) Siming Chen
8. (United States) Monica Webb
9. (China) Jia Li
10. (United States) Melissa Little
11. (United States) Janet Atwell
12. (United States) Caroline Pao
13. (Austria) Gerda Gregerson
14. (United States) Loree Jon Hasson
15. (United States) Emily Duddy
16. (United States) Teruko Cucculelli
17. (United States) Gail Eaton
18. (United States) Sara Miller
19. (Austria) Jasmin Ouschan
20. (United States) Jenna Bishoff
21. (South Korea) Kim Ga-Young
22. (Russia) Kristina Tkach
23. (United States) April Larson
24. (United States) Kim Newsome
25. (United States) Bonnie Arnold
26. (United States) Jessica Barnes
27. (Canada) Maureen Seto
28. (Canada) Cathy Metzinger
29. (United States) Dawn Hopkins
30. (United States) Ashley Burrows
31. (United States) Eugenia Gyftopoulos
32. (United States) Beth Fondell
