= Kim Ga-young =

Kim Ga-young may refer to:

- Kim Ga-young (pool player)
- Kim Ga-young (actress)
