= Mixed doubles =

Physical sport where both sexes are included

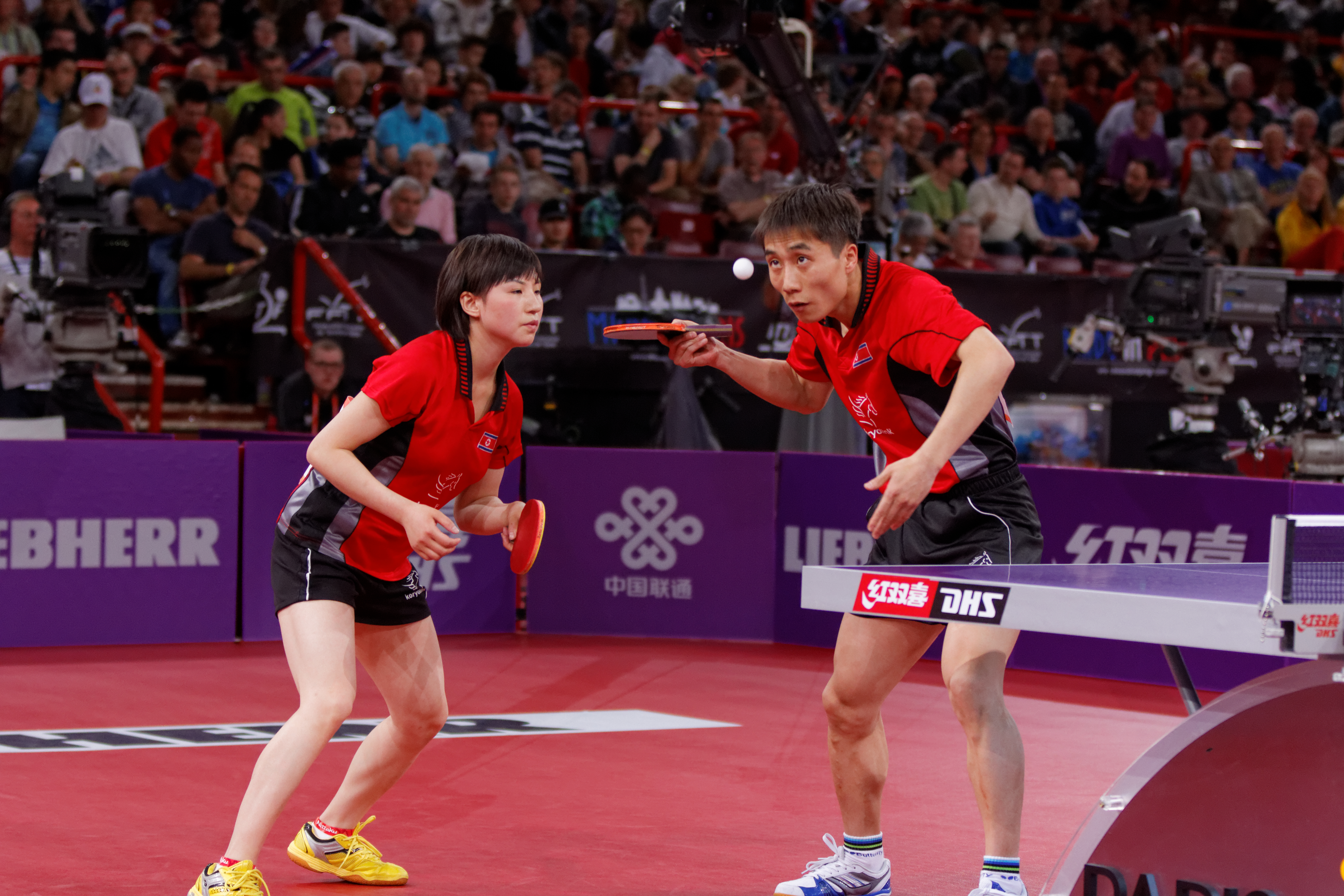
A mixed doubles team competing at the World Table Tennis Championships

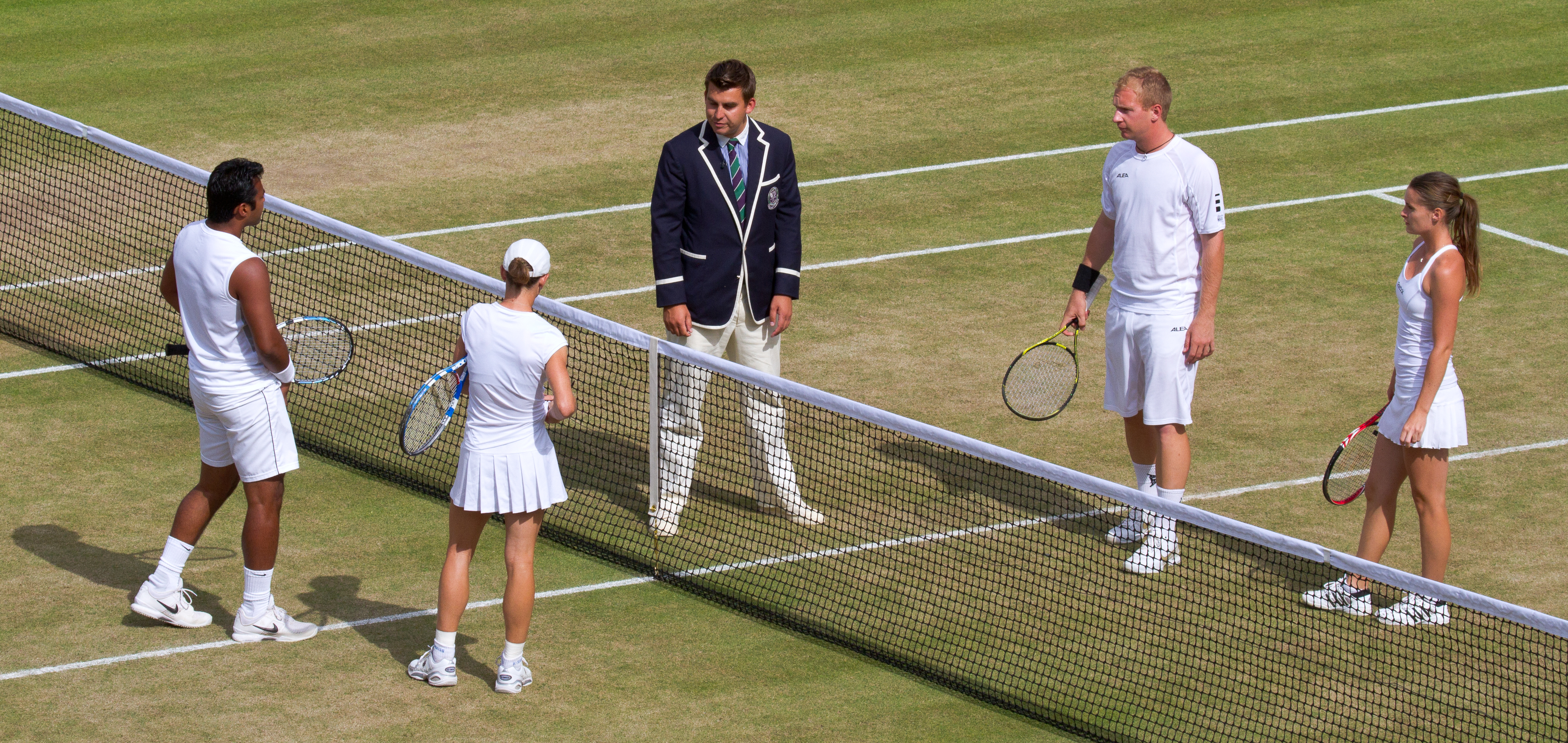
Mixed doubles tennis players at Wimbledon

Mixed doubles or mixed pairs is a form of mixed-sex sports that consists of teams of one man and one woman. This variation of competition is prominent in curling and racket sports, such as tennis, table tennis, and badminton (where it is known as doubles), as well as gymnastics, figure skating, and card games such as contract bridge (where it is known as pairs).

== Mixed doubles ==
=== Tennis ===
Mixed doubles has a long history in tennis. The social benefits of mixed tennis were recognised in England in the late 19th century, with it serving as a social outing for married couples and a way for single men and women to build a relationship. This variant appeared at the United States National Championships in 1892, followed by the French Championships in 1902, Wimbledon in 1913, and the Australian Open in 1922. It made an early appearance at the second Summer Olympics in 1900 though it was dropped from the programme in the 1920s and did not reappear until the 2012 London Olympics.

The Hopman Cup, held from 1989 to 2019, featured a mixed doubles match as the third rubber of each tie. The United Cup, founded in 2022, became the first mixed-gender team event to offer both ATP and WTA rankings points to its players, with a maximum 500 points for the winners.

=== Table tennis ===
Mixed doubles has featured at the World Table Tennis Championships since its first edition in 1926, although this did not gain Olympic status until 2020.

=== Badminton ===
The 1899 All England Open Badminton Championships saw the first major mixed doubles badminton event. A mixed doubles tournament was included at the Commonwealth Games since the sport was introduced in 1966. The European Mixed Team Badminton Championships, first held in 1972, includes mixed doubles matches. The World Badminton Championships has a mixed doubles tournament since its inception in 1977. The Sudirman Cup, held since 1989, is a team tournament that features men's, women's and mixed doubles matches in every tie. Badminton at the Summer Olympics features a mixed doubles badminton event since 1996.

=== Curling ===
The concept was a late addition to the sport of curling, with the World Mixed Doubles Curling Championship being first held in 2008 and the 2018 Winter Olympics being the first time it was given Olympic status.

=== Gaelic handball ===
Although Gaelic handball is usually played as single-sex (singles or doubles), mixed doubles competitions take place at juvenile and schools level.

== Mixed pairs ==
Pair figure skating shares a history with paired dancing. The form of skating made its debut at both the Winter Olympics and World Figure Skating Championships in 1908. The World Bridge Championships debuted a mixed pairs competition at its second edition in 1966. Pair Go is played by two pairs, with each team consisting of a male and a female. It was popularized by the Japan Pair Go Association as a means of increasing female participation in the game.
