= Jasmin Ouschan =

Austrian pool player

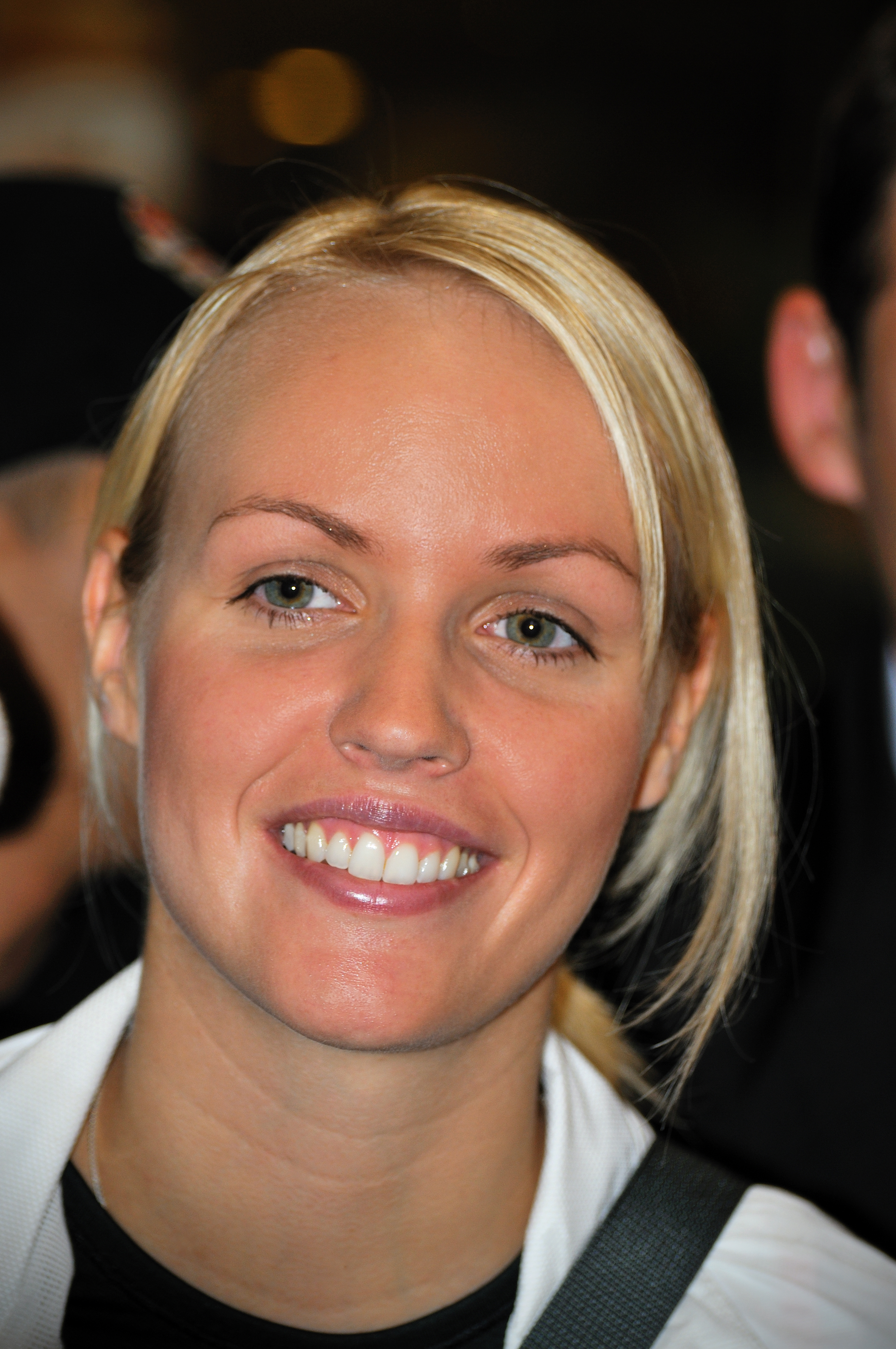

Personal information
- Born: 10 January 1986 (age 40) Klagenfurt am Wörthersee

Pool career
- Country: Austria
- Turned pro: 2002
Medal record
Representing Austria Women's Ten-ball WPA World Ten-ball Championship
Representing Austria Women's Eight-ball WPA World Eight-ball Championship
Representing Austria
Women's nine-ball
World Games
Gold medal – first place	2005 Duisburg	Individual
Silver medal – second place	2009 Kaohsiung	Individual

Jasmin Ouschan (German pronunciation: [ˈjasmɪn ˈɔʊʃan]; born 10 January 1986) is an Austrian professional pool player from Klagenfurt, Carinthia. Her first professional competition occurred in 2002, but she did not officially become a professional member of the Women's Professional Billiards Association (WPBA) until 2007. She is currently one of the top-ranked women in the world according to the 2010 prize money list and by the WPBA rankings. At times, she has been ranked as the number one female player in the world. Since 2006, she has been listed among the top-ten women in the annual prize money rankings. Ouschan competes regularly with men on the Euro Tour and in 2008 became the first woman to earn a medal in an open world pool championship. She is recognized as a WPBA Elite Pro.

In international competition she has earned the World Games 2005 gold medal and World Games 2009 silver medal in nine-ball. As of 2013, she has earned a total of twenty-nine individual European Pool Championships gold medals (ten in eight-ball, ten in nine-ball, six in straight pool and three in ten-ball) since 1999, including eighteen (four in eight-ball, five in nine-ball, six in straight pool and three in ten-ball) since joining the open Women's division in 2005. She was the Youth European Champion in eight-ball six consecutive years from 1999–2004.

In the 2010 Pool & Billiard European Championship, held in Zagreb, Croatia, she became the first woman to sweep gold medals in all four disciplines contested (eight-ball, nine-ball, ten-ball and straight pool). In 2010, she also won the Women's WPA World Ten-ball Championship.

== Background ==
Born and raised in Klagenfurt, Ouschan began playing pool at a very early age because her parents owned a pool hall. Although she had a miniature table of her own, she aspired to play on the regulation size table and started playing by standing on a box. She has trained with Michael Neumann since the age of six and continues to train with him to this day. She is the older sister of Albin Ouschan. She graduated from high school in 2004 and has since taken coursework to become an accredited pool trainer in Europe.

== Career ==
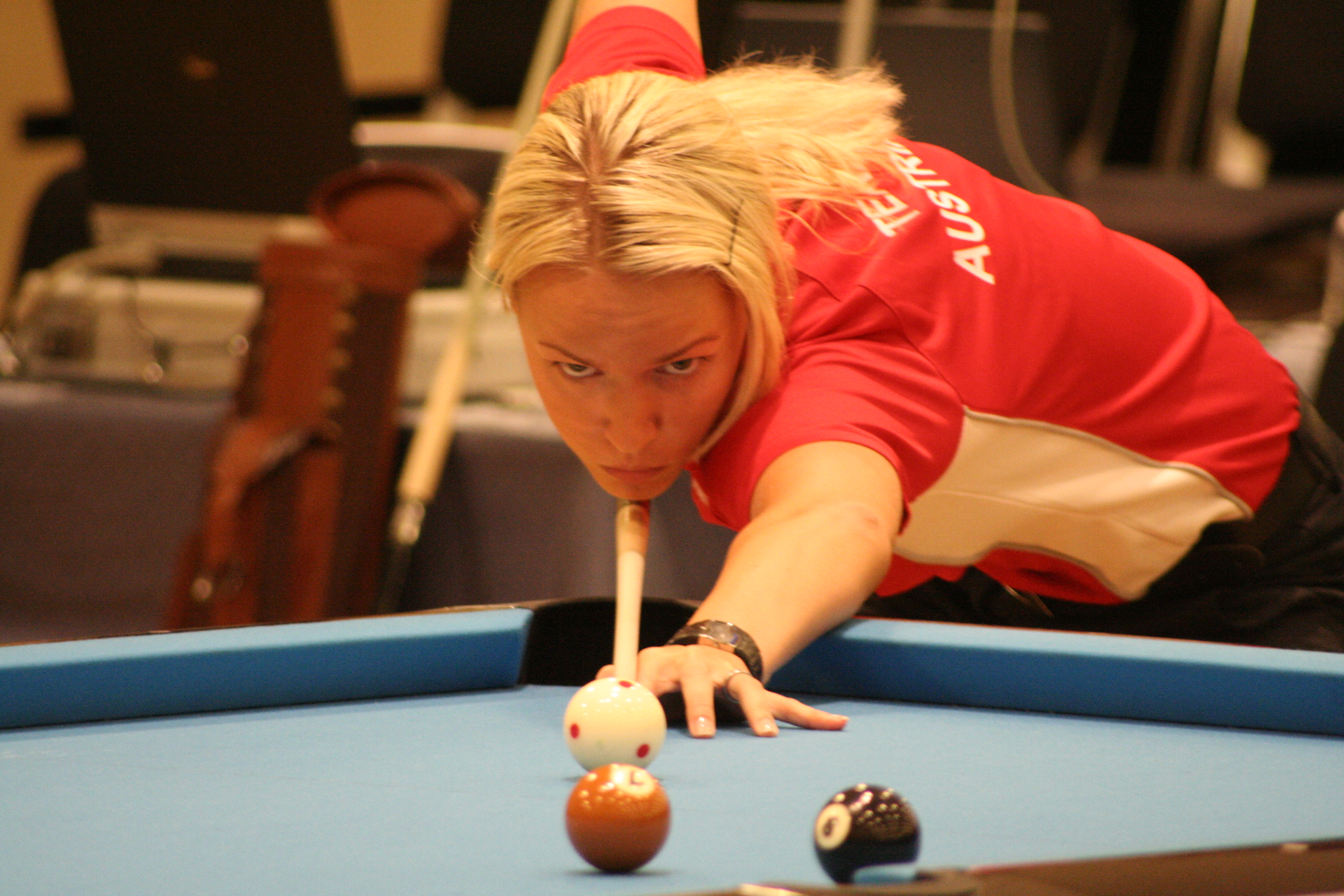
Ouschan at the European Championship 2008

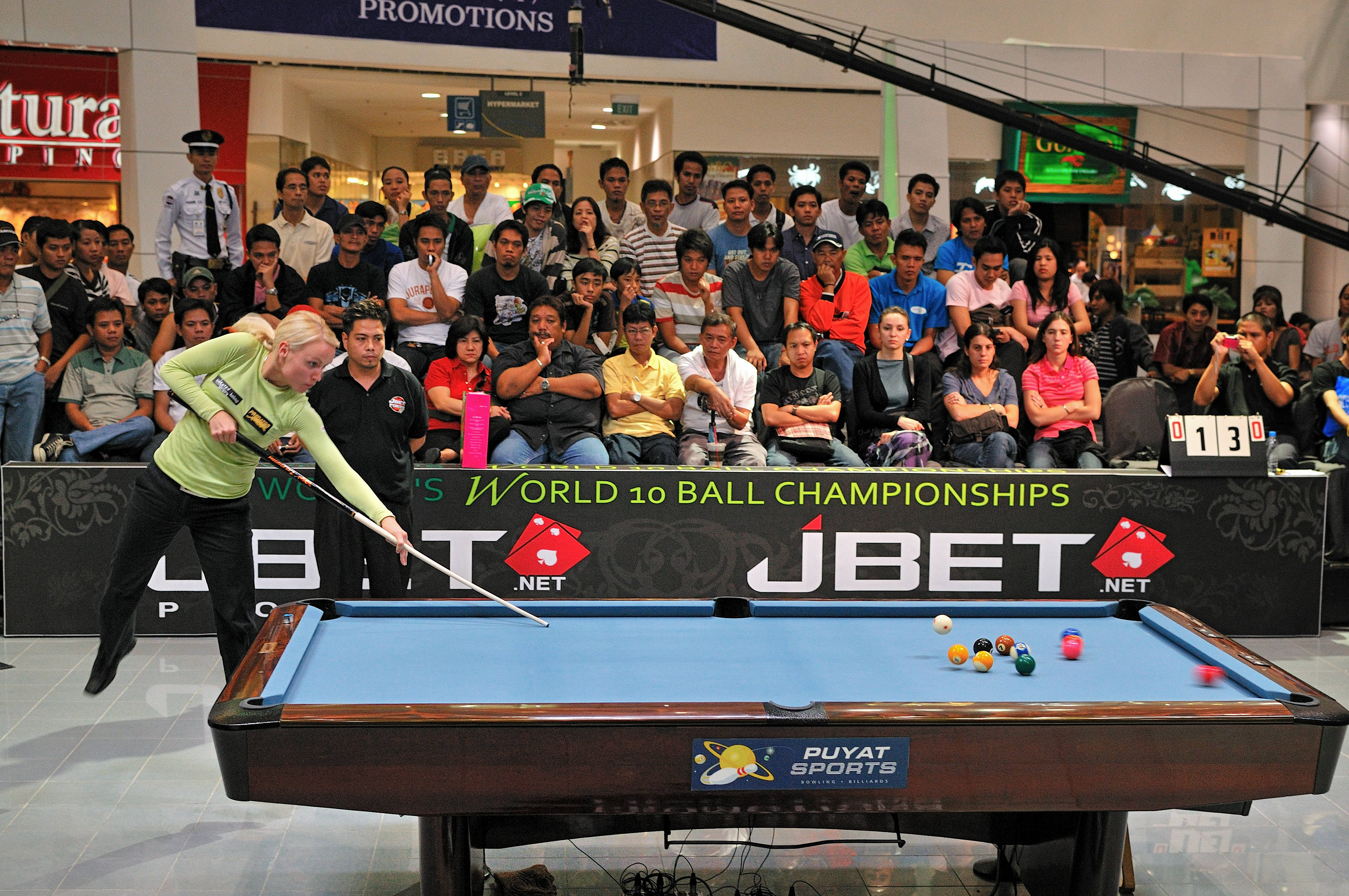
Ouschan airborne during a hard break at the 2009 Women's World 10 Ball Championship

She has earned eight open European Championship titles in eight-ball (2006, 2008, 2009), nine-ball (2005, 2009), and straight pool (2005–2007) in the women's division. She also won eleven Youth European Championship titles in eight-ball (1999–2004) and nine-ball (1999–2001, 2003, 2004).

=== Pre-professional ===
In 1996, she entered at a tournament in Austria in which players like Allison Fisher, Gerda Hofstaetter and Franziska Stark participated and placed 4th place behind these three well established players. In 1998, she earned a silver medal in eight-ball and a bronze medal in nine-ball at the Youth European Championship. Starting in 1999, she won gold medals in both events every year as a Youth until 2004 except in 2002 when she earned a silver in nine-ball.

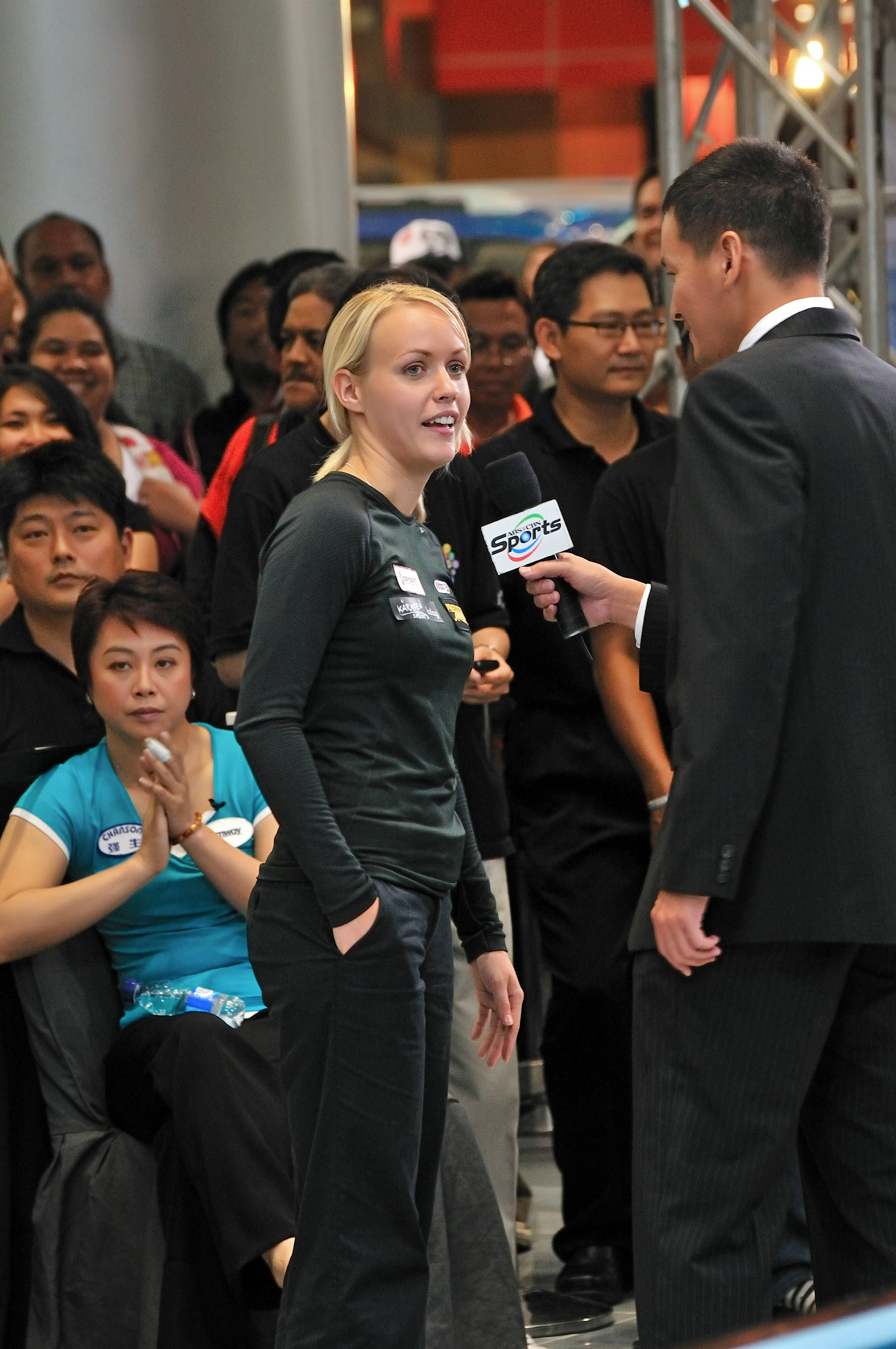
Ouschan during a post-match speech

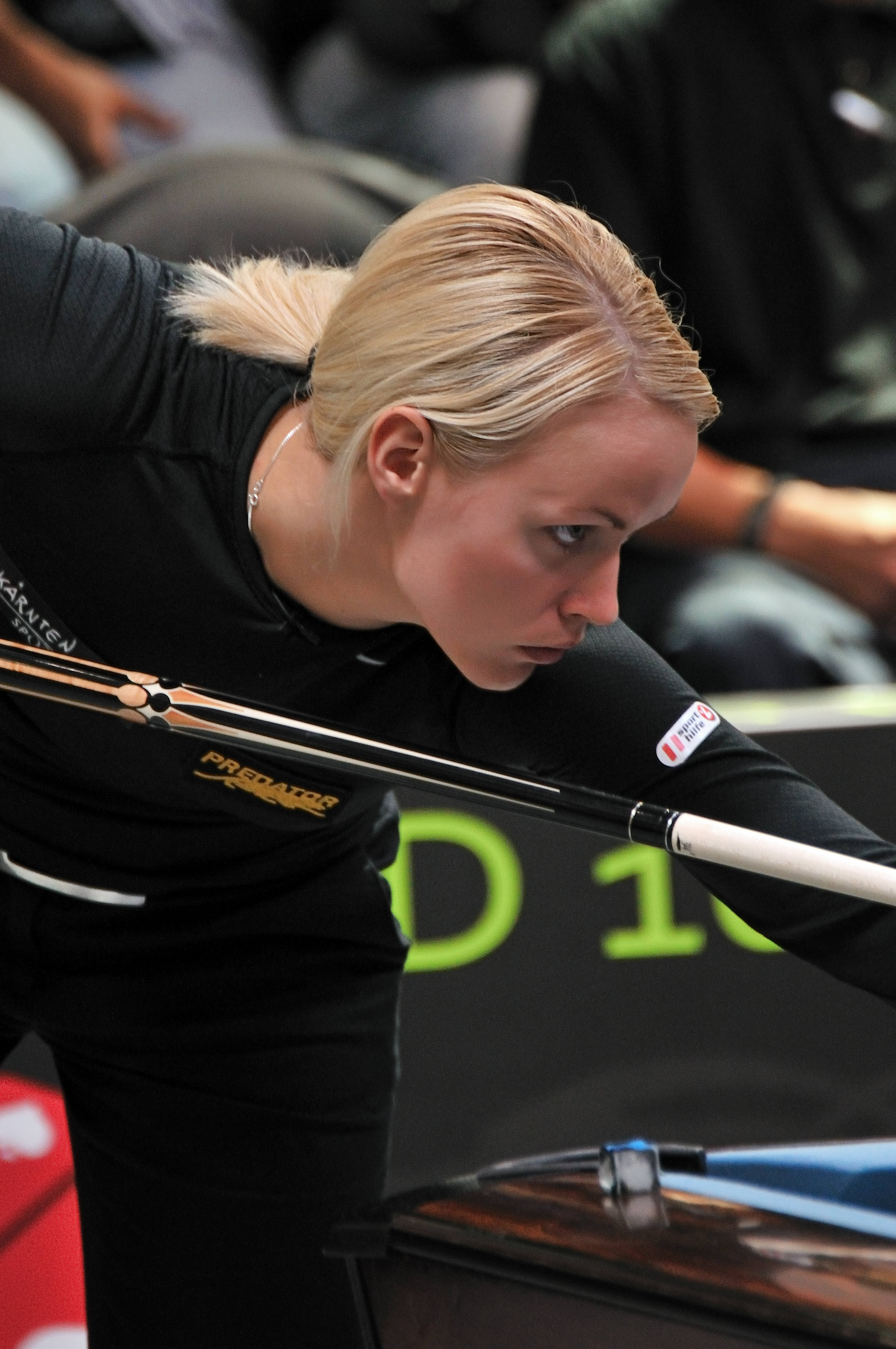
Ouschan lines up a shot

Her first professional competition was the Florida Classic 2002. In 2002, she had professional earnings of US$1,750 in prize money for taking first place in the 2002 WPBA Amateur Nationals. In 2005, she had earnings of $1,700. That year she became the World Games women's nine-ball champion. She also moved up to the Women's division in the annual European Championships in 2005 and has earned at least one gold medal each year since.

In 2006, she was ranked sixth among women in the prize money year-end rankings with a total of $36,251 in earnings. That year, she won the May 14—20, 2006 BCA Open Nine-ball Championship women's division, defeating the UK's Allison Fisher and earning $20,000. She has competed in what have traditionally been regarded as men's tournaments, especially while participating in the EuroTour. She placed 5th in the men's World Straight Pool Championship in 2006, which was won by Thorsten Hohmann. She also finished 3rd in the women's World Pool 10-ball Championship in Manila, Philippines.

=== Professional ===
In 2007, she joined the WPBA. That year, she was ranked ninth among women in the prize money year-end rankings with a total of $23,000 in earnings. Her best payday for the year was a second-place finish at the WPBA San Diego Classic for which she earned $8,300. She competed again at the Men's World Straight Pool Championship in 2007 but lost to Warren Kiamco in the last 16 to finish in 9th place.

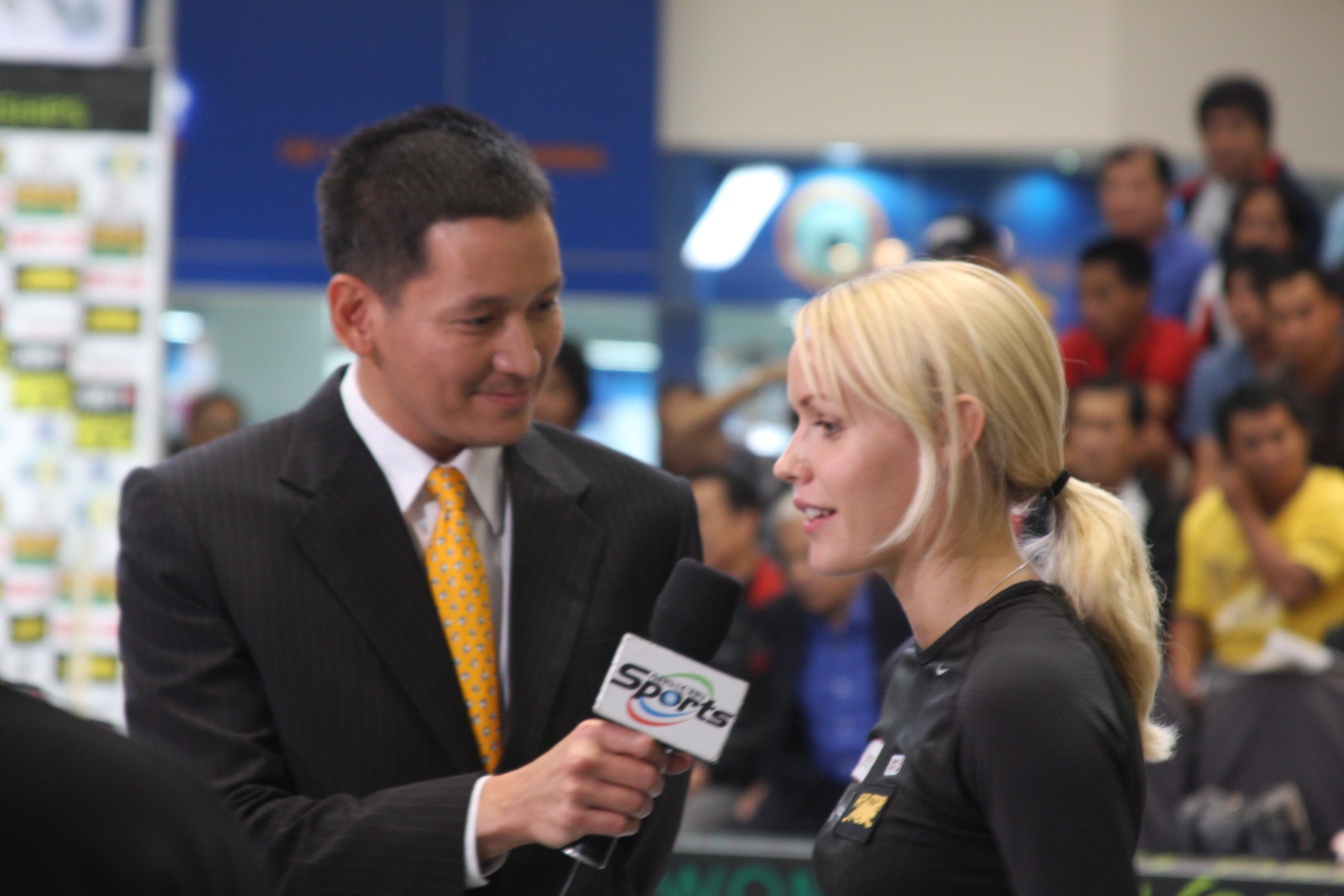
Ouschan interviewed by a reporter

In 2008, she was ranked fourth among women in the prize money year-end rankings with a total of $44,059 in earnings. During the season, she reached the top of the world rankings. Her largest victory that year was the September 14 WPBA Carolina Classic 7–1 win over Jeanette Lee, which earned her $13,500. In 2008, she reached the Men's World Straight Pool Championship semifinal by beating Mika Immonen and defending champion Oliver Ortmann, but then lost against Francisco Bustamante. However, her third-place finish resulted in the first medal won by any woman in an open world pool championship.

In April 2009, she won the European Championship eight-ball competition. She was also the world's top-ranked woman in early 2009. On June 21, 2009, she earned $12,700 for winning the WPBA Great Lakes Classic. On July 25, she earned a silver medal after losing to Allison Fisher at the 2009 World Games. Ouschan also won the October 14–18, 2009 WPBA Pacific Coast Classic and the November 11–15, 2009 WPBA Nationals. She finished third among women in 2009 with earnings of $58,578.

In the March 2010, European Pool Championships she swept all four disciplines, including the newly contested ten-ball. First in straight pool she defeated fellow Austrian Gerda Hofstätter. Then in ten-ball, she defeated German Ina Jentschura. Next, she defeated Norwegian Line Kjorsvik in eight-ball. Finally, she defeated Hofstatter again in the nine-ball championship. She became the first woman to win more than two gold medals in a single competition. In October in Manila, Philippines, she won the Yalin Women's World 10-ball championship. During the year, she also won the WPBA September 23–26, 2010 Atlanta Classic held in Atlanta, Georgia. Her 2010 total of $41,391 ranked second among women.

In January 2011, she won the WPBA Masters by defeating Karen Corr at Mount Pleasant, Michigan for a prize of $7,500.00. At the 2011 European Pool Championships, she won gold medals in straight pool, ten-ball and nine-ball, but did not medal in eight-ball. On March 26, she defeated Kjorsvik for the straight pool title 75–31. Then, on April 1, she defeated Hofstatter, 7–2 in nine-ball. On April 2, she defeated Nataliya Seroshtan 6–1 in ten-ball. Her 2011 total of $31,300 ranked eighth among women.

Her 2012 total of $30,470 ranked fifth among women. At the European Championships, she won gold at the 10-ball competition, and she placed in bronze in the other three individual events as well as the team competition.

Her 2013 total of $26,048 ranked eighth among women. At the European Championships, she won gold at both the straight pool and the 9-ball competitions, and she placed in bronze in the other two individual events as well as the team competition.

In 2021, she was ranked the 17th best woman billiard player in the world by the Women's Professional Billiard Association.

=== Other activities ===
In 2021, Jasmin placed second on Dancing Stars, the Austrian version of Dancing with the Stars. Her professional partner was Florian Gschaider.

== Equipment and sponsors ==
She shoots with Predator/MEZZ (regular with 314 shaft) and Predator BK2 (Break) cue sticks. She is sponsored by Kärnten Sport (Kaernten Sport) Kelag, Sportsunion, Predator, and Justis Cue Cases. Her home club is the PBC Eintracht Klagenfurt.

== Career titles and achievements ==
- 2026 Predator EuroTour Turkish Open
- 2026 European Pool Championship 8-ball
- 2025 WPA Women's World Eight-ball Championship
- 2025 Euro Tour Estonian Open
- 2025 European Pool Championship 8-ball
- 2025 Euro Tour Italian Open
- 2025 WPBA Iron City Invitational V
- 2024 WPBA Biker Week Showdown
- 2023 WPBA Aramith / Dr Pool Classic
- 2023 WPBA Masters
- 2022 WPBA Masters
- 2020 Euro Tour Treviso Open
- 2019 Euro Tour Austria Open
- 2019 Euro Tour Veldhoven Open
- 2019 European Pool Championship 9-ball
- 2018 Euro Tour Austria Open
- 2018 Euro Tour Veldhoven Open
- 2018 Euro Tour Klagenfurt Open
- 2018 European Pool Championship 14.1
- 2017 Euro Tour Portugal Open
- 2017 Euro Tour Austria Open
- 2017 European Pool Championship 8-ball
- 2016 European Pool Championship 10-ball
- 2016 European Pool Championship 14.1
- 2015 WPBA Masters
- 2015 Euro Tour Portugal Open
- 2015 Euro Tour German Open
- 2015 European Pool Championship 9-ball
- 2015 European Pool Championship 14.1
- 2014 Euro Tour North Cyprus Open
- 2014 European Pool Championship 9-ball
- 2014 European Pool Championship 14.1
- 2013 Women Swedish 10-Ball Open
- 2013 Women 8-Ball Open
- 2013 European Pool Championship 9-ball
- 2013 European Pool Championship 10-ball
- 2012 WPBA Tour Championship
- 2012 European Pool Championship 10-ball
- 2011 WPBA Masters
- 2011 European Pool Championship 9-ball
- 2011 European Pool Championship 10-ball
- 2011 European Pool Championship 14.1
- 2010 EPBF Player of the Year
- 2010 WPA Women's World Ten-ball Championship
- 2010 WPBA Atlanta Classic
- 2010 European Pool Championship 10-ball
- 2010 European Pool Championship 9-ball
- 2010 European Pool Championship 8-ball
- 2010 European Pool Championship 14.1
- 2009 WPBA National 9-Ball Championship
- 2009 WPBA Pacific Coast Classic
- 2009 WPBA Great Lakes Classic
- 2009 European Pool Championship 9-ball
- 2009 European Pool Championship 8-ball
- 2008 WPBA Carolina Classic
- 2008 European Pool Championship 8-ball
- 2007 ESPN Women's World Pool Cup
- 2007 European Pool Championship 14.1
- 2006 WPBA BCA 9-Ball Championship
- 2006 European Pool Championship 8-ball
- 2006 European Pool Championship 14.1
- 2005 European Pool Championship 9-ball
- 2005 European Pool Championship 14.1
- 2005 World Games Nine-ball Singles
- 2002 WPBA Amateur National 9-Ball Championship
