= World Pool Association =

World governing body for pool billiards

- Sport: Pool
- Category: Cue sports
- Jurisdiction: Worldwide
- Abbreviation: WPA
- Founded: 1987
- Affiliation: World Confederation of Billiards Sports
- Headquarters: Gauteng, South Africa
- President: Ishaun Singh

Official website
- wpapool.com

The World Pool Association (WPA) is the international governing body for pool (pocket billiards). It was formed in 1987, and was initially headed by a provisional board of directors consisting of representatives from Australia, the Americas, Africa, and Europe. As of 2023, the WPA president is Ishaun Singh of South Africa. It is an associate of the World Confederation of Billiards Sports (WCBS), the international umbrella organization that encompasses the major cue sports. WPA is headquartered in Gauteng, South Africa.

== History ==
In the late 1970s, Kazuo Fujima of Japan invited various European players to compete in the All Japan Championship. This led to cooperation with Europe, being the first time contacts between Europe and Asian associations had been made. However, most of the efforts were initiated by individuals, and progressed slowly. By the mid-80s, many European players, who had the European Pool Championship as their highest level of competition, have been aware of pool events in the United States and were dissatisfied with the development of the sport in the continent, and wanted to compete at a higher level.

In November 1987, at a European Pocket Billiard Federation (EPBF) board meeting in Germany, the idea of a worldwide competition resurfaced. The EPBF board members used their own money to fund a group to create a logo, letterheads and communications with various pool organizations. Kazuo Fujima of Japan replied that Asia was interested in participating.

In May 1988, the group's general assembly was held in conjunction alongside the European Pool Championship in Stockholm, Sweden. The group formed a provisional board that consisted of Kazuo Fujima (Japan), Paul Gerni (USA), Jorgen Sandman (Sweden), and Horst Vondenhoff (Germany).

In March 1990, the inaugural WPA World Nine-ball Championship was held in Bergheim, Germany. The playing field included 32 men and 16 women in separate divisions, and has since become an annual event.

On March 3, 1990, the World Pool-Billiard Association was sanctioned by the general assembly as the international governing body for pool. The acronym WPA was selected so it would not conflict with the existing Women's Professional Billiard Association (WPBA).

Membership in the WPA has grown since its inception. In 1991, Australia and New Zealand, under the umbrella of the Australasian Pool Association, became members. In 1999, the organizations associated with Latin America and the Caribbean became members, and in 2000, a substantial portion of the organizations from Africa joined.

== Currently sanctioned tournaments ==
- WPA World Nine-ball Championship
- WPA World Ten-ball Championship
- WPA World Eight-ball Championship
- WPA World Blackball Championship
- WPA World Artistic Pool Championship
- WPA World Pyramid Championship
- WPA World Heyball Championship

== Partnerships ==
- International Heyball Pool Association (IHPA) - (Since 2023)
- International Pyramid Confederation (IPC) - (Since 1998)

== Member confederations and countries ==
The WPA members are grouped by six continental/regional confederations, who in turn, consist of members from a country's national federation. The chart and table shows the WPA's members as of September 2022:

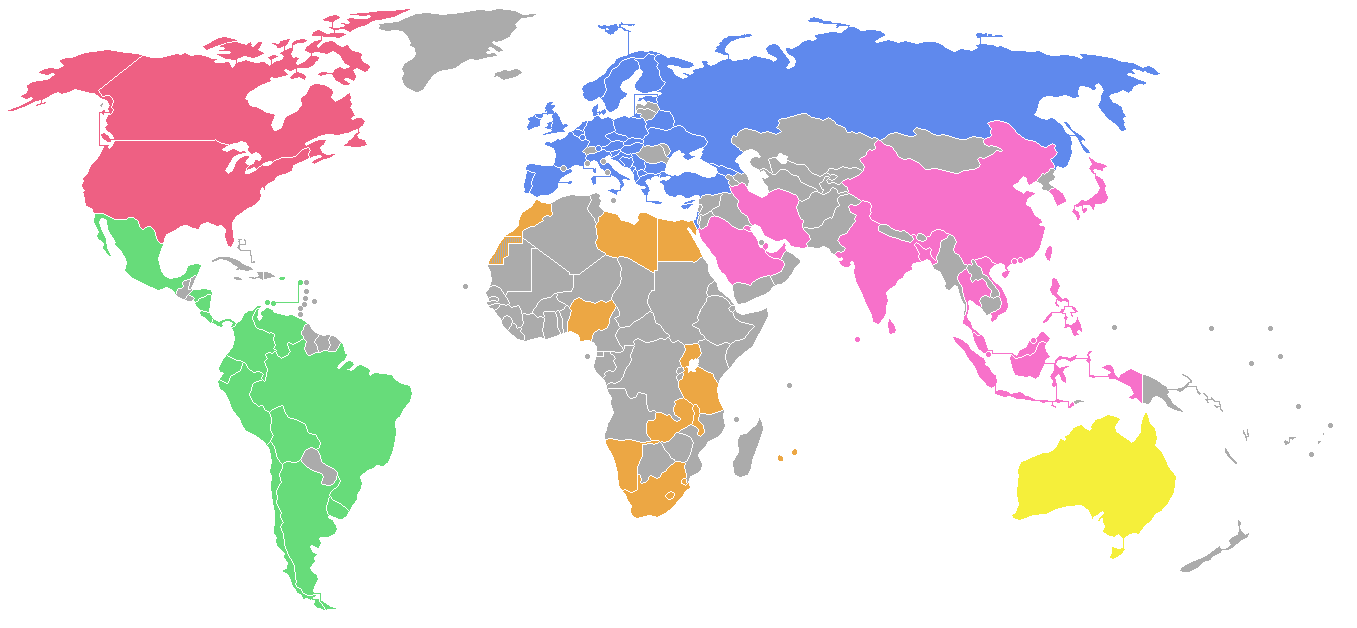
Map of member countries as of November 2011 (July 2008 data also available)

In 2022 the Asian Confederation of Billiard Sports (ACBS) replaced the Asian Pocket Billiard Union (APBU) as the WPA continental affiliate for Asia.

Organization (and map key color)	Member Countries		
All Africa Pool Association (AAPA)	Algeria; Cameroon; DR Congo; Egypt; Eritrea; Eswatini; Ethiopia; Ghana	Kenya; Lesotho; Libya; Malawi; Mauritius; Morocco; Nigeria; Zambia	South Africa; Tanzania; Tunisia; Uganda
Asian Confederation of Billiard Sports (ACBS)	Bangladesh; Brunei; China; Chinese Taipei Doha-Qatar; Hong Kong; India; Pakistan	Indonesia Iran Japan; Kuwait; Lebanon; Macau; Malaysia; Maldives	Philippines Saudi Arabia Singapore South Korea; Sri Lanka; United Arab Emirates; Vietnam
Billiard Congress of America (BCA) (Note: The BCA is a single organization, without separate national US and Canadian federations. It pre-dates, and was a founding member of, the WPA.)	Canada	United States	
Pan-American Billiard Confederation (CPB)	Argentina; Aruba Bolivia; Bonaire; Brazil; Chile	Colombia; Costa Rica; Curaçao; Ecuador; Guatemala Honduras	Mexico Nicaragua; Panama; Peru; Uruguay; Venezuela
European Pocket Billiard Federation (EPBF)	Albania; Austria; Belarus; Belgium; Bosnia and Herzegovina; Croatia; Cyprus; Czech Republic Denmark; Estonia; Finland; France; Georgia	Germany; Great Britain; Greece; Hungary; Italy; Latvia; Liechtenstein; Lithuania; Luxembourg; Netherlands; North Cyprus; Norway; Ukraine	Poland Portugal; Romania; Russia; Serbia; Slovakia; Slovenia; Spain; Sweden; Switzerland; Turkey
Oceania Pocket Billiard Association (OPBA)	Australia	New Zealand	Tahiti

== See also ==
- List of professional sports leagues
- List of world eight-ball champions
- List of WPA World Nine-ball champions
