= Ten-ball =

Modern pool game

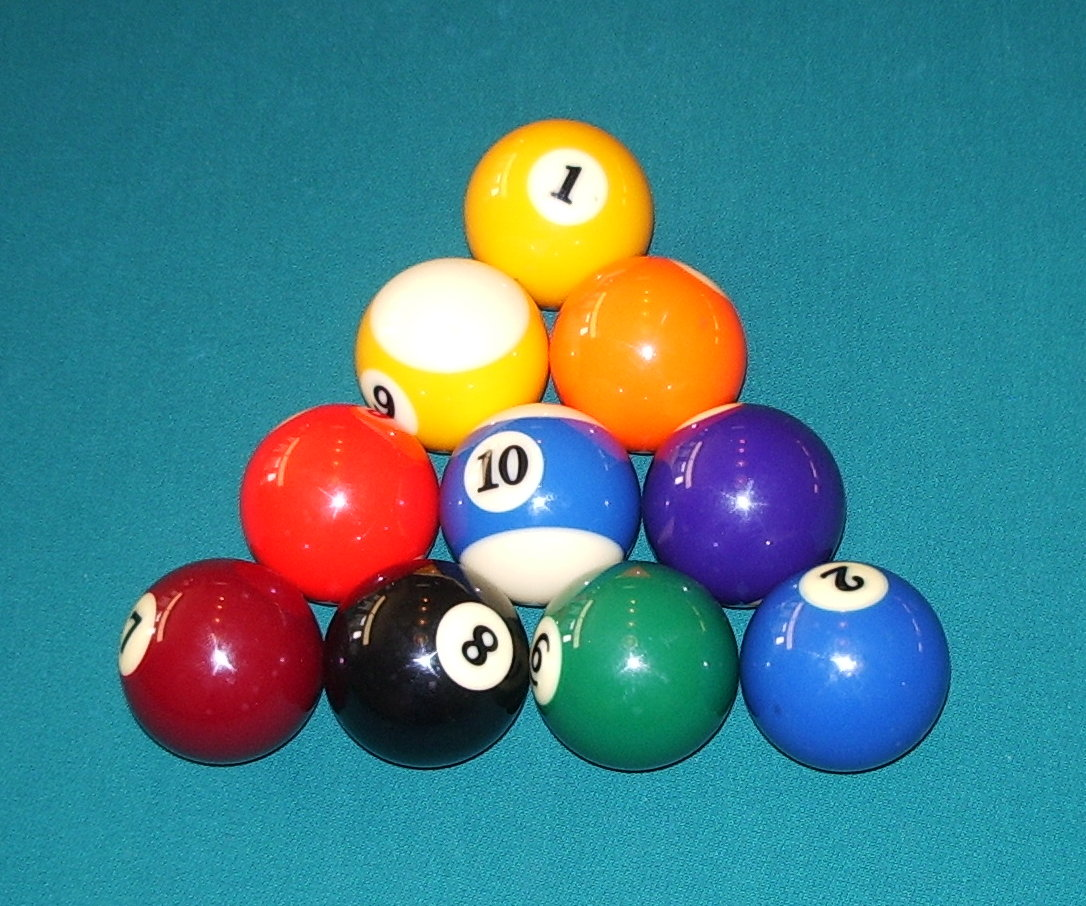
- A valid ten-ball rack; the 1 is at the apex on the foot spot, and the 10 (the money ball) is in the center. The remaining balls can be in any position.
- Highest governing body: World Pool-Billiard Association
- First played: 1960s

Characteristics
- Contact: No
- Team members: single competitors or doubles
- Mixed-sex: Yes
- Equipment: Cue sports equipment
- Glossary: glossary of cue sports terms

Presence
- Country or region: Worldwide

Ten-ball is a rotation pool game similar to nine-ball, but using ten balls instead of nine, and with the 10 ball instead of the 9 as the "money ball".

Although the game has existed since the early 1960s, its popularity has risen since the early 2000s as a result of concerns that nine-ball has suffered as a result of flaws in its fundamental structure, particularly the ease with which players can often make balls from the break. The World Pool-Billiard Association (WPA) standardized rules for ten-ball are very similar to those for nine-ball, but with key changes to increase the difficulty of the game. In contrast to nine-ball, it is slightly harder to pocket any balls on the break shot with the more crowded rack, the initial shooter cannot instantly win the game by pocketing the 10 on the break, all shots must be called, and performing a string of break-and-runs on successive racks is statistically more difficult to achieve.

== Racking ==
The 10 balls are racked in a triangle, with the 1 ball positioned at the apex of the rack, the 10 ball positioned in the middle of the rack, and the other balls placed randomly throughout, with the apex ball on the foot spot. Some leagues and tournaments (such as the US Open 10 Ball) may stipulate that the 2 and 3 balls are to be at the back corners of the triangle.

== Play ==
As a rotation game, to make a legal hit in ten-ball, the cue ball must contact the lowest numbered ball first, and subsequently at least one ball must hit any rail or be pocketed, without the cue ball being pocketed. If no ball hits a rail and no ball is pocketed, a foul is declared, and the shooter's turn is over.

Under WPA standardized rules, ten-ball is a call-shot game; that is, the shooter must state which ball they intend to pocket and into which pocket. The pocketed ball does not have to be the lowest-numbered ball on the table—combination and carom shots are legal, as long as the shooter pockets the nominated ball in the nominated pocket without committing any foul. Flukes—shots that go in an unintended pocket (usually by random chance)—do not count; if a player pockets only balls other than the nominated ball, or pockets the nominated ball in the wrong pocket, the pocketed balls stay down, but the shooter's turn is over, as though they missed the shot completely. Only if the cue ball first makes contact with the lowest-numbered ball on the table, the nominated ball goes into the nominated pocket, and no other foul is committed, does the shooter's turn continue.

The only exception to the call-shot rule is on the break, for which there is no call. If the 10 ball is pocketed on the break, it is placed back on the foot spot and the shooter's turn continues. Any other balls that are pocketed on the break stay down, with the shooter continuing their turn, unless a foul was committed. If no ball is pocketed on the break, the shooter's turn is over.

The use of called shots is considered controversial among some of the game's elite, as many professional players are experts at playing multi-way shots where they may be attempting to pocket more than one ball on a given shot. Nonetheless, the rule has been adopted for professional competitions.
