= Index of Windows games (V) =

This is an index of Microsoft Windows games.

This list has been split into multiple pages. Please use the Table of Contents to browse it.

Title	Released	Developer	Publisher
V Rising	2024	Stunlock Studios	Level Infinite
V-Rally	1997	Eden Studios	Infogrames
V-Rally 2	1999	Eden Studios	Infogrames Europe
V-Rally 3	2002	Eden Studios	Atari
Valkyria Chronicles 4	2018	Sega	Sega
Valley	2016	Blue Isle Studios	Blue Isle Studios
Valorant	2020	Riot Games	Riot Games
Vampire: The Masquerade – Bloodlines	2004	Troika Games	Activision
Vampire: The Masquerade – Redemption	2000	Nihilistic Software	Activision
Vampire: The Masquerade – Swansong	2022	Big Bad Wolf	Nacon
Vampyr	2018	Dontnod Entertainment	Focus Home Interactive
A Vampyre Story	2008	Autumn Moon Entertainment	Crimson Cow
Vangers	1998	K-D Lab	Buka Entertainment, Interactive Magic
Vanguard: Saga of Heroes	2007	Sony Online Entertainment	Sony Online Entertainment
The Vanishing of Ethan Carter	2014	The Astronauts	The Astronauts
Vanquish	2017	PlatinumGames	Sega
Vantage Master	1997	Nihon Falcom	Nihon Falcom
VDrift	2005	Joe Venzon, Chris Guirl, Dick Maurer, Matthew Nicholson	
Vega Strike	2008	The Vega Strike Team	
Vegas Games 2000	1998	New World Computing	The 3DO Company
Vegas Tycoon	2003	Deep Red Games	Global Star Software
Venetica	2009	Deck13 Interactive	DTP Entertainment
Venice	2007	Retro64, PopCap Games	PopCap Games
Venture Arctic	2007	Pocketwatch Games	Pocketwatch Games, Brighter Minds Media
Versailles 1685	1997	Cryo Interactive	Cryo Interactive
Versailles II: Testament of the King	2001	Cryo Interactive Entertainment	Reunion des Musees Nationaux
Victor Vran	2015	Haemimont Games	EuroVideo Medien
Victoria: An Empire Under the Sun	2003	Paradox Interactive	Paradox Interactive
Victoria II	2010	Paradox Interactive	Paradox Interactive
Victoria 3	2022	Paradox Development Studio	Paradox Interactive
Vietcong	2003	Pterodon	Gathering of Developers
Vietcong 2	2005	Pterodon, Illusion Softworks	2K Games
Viewfinder	2023	Sad Owl Studios	Thunderful Publishing
Vigil: Blood Bitterness	2006	Freegamer	Microapplication
Vigilance	1998	Tsunami	SegaSoft
Viking: Battle for Asgard	2012	Creative Assembly	Sega
Vikings: Wolves of Midgard	2017	Games Farm	Kalypso Media
Viper Racing	1998	Monster Games	Sierra Entertainment
Virtua Chess	1995	Titus France SA	Titus France SA
Virtua Squad	1996	Sega-AM2	Sega
Virtua Cop 2	1997	Sega-AM2	Sega
Virtua Fighter	1996	Sega-AM2, Sega-AM1	Sega
Virtua Fighter 2	1997	Sega-AM2	Sega
Virtua Tennis	1999	Sega-AM3	Sega
Virtua Tennis 3	2006	Sumo Digital	SEGA
Virtua Tennis 2009	2009	Sumo Digital	Sega
Virtual Chess 2	1997	Titus France SA	Titus France SA
Virtual Deep Sea Fishing	1998	Taff System	Taff System
Virtual On: Cyber Troopers	1997	Sega-AM3	Sega
Virtual Pool	1995	Celeris	Interplay Entertainment
Virtual Pool 2	1997	Celeris	VR Sports
Virtual Pool 3	2001	Celeris, Digital Mayhem	Interplay Entertainment
Virtual Pool Hall	2000	Celeris	Interplay Entertainment
Virtual Safari	1996	Anglia Multimedia	Fujitsu Interactive
Virtual Villagers	2006	Last Day of Work	Last Day of Work
Visage	2020	SadSquare Studio	SadSquare Studio
Viscera Cleanup Detail	2015	RuneStorm	RuneStorm
Visions of Mana	2024	Ouka Studios	Square Enix
Vivisector: Beast Within	2005	Action Forms	1C Company
Vocabulon	1998	Megableu, Index+	Megableu, Index+
The Void	2008	Ice-Pick Lodge	ND Games
Voyage: Inspired by Jules Verne	2005	Kheops Studio	The Adventure Company
Voyage Century Online	2006	Snail Games	IGG Inc.
