= Virtual Pool 64 =

1998 video game

- North American Nintendo 64 cover art
- Developer: Celeris
- Publisher: Crave Entertainment
- Platform: Nintendo 64
- Release: NA: December 17, 1998; EU: February 26, 1999
- Genre: Sports (pool)
- Modes: Single-player, multiplayer

Virtual Pool 64 is a 3D first-person sports simulation video game that was developed by American studio Celeris and released for the Nintendo 64 by Crave Entertainment on December 17, 1998, in North America, and in Europe on February 26, 1999. The game features simulations of 11 forms of pool (pocket billiards). It is part of the "Virtual Pool" game franchise, which also includes the PC games Virtual Pool, Virtual Pool 2, Virtual Pool Hall and Virtual Pool 3. The game has been simultaneously lauded as "a top-notch simulation" and criticized as dull, lacking both player incentive and engaging characters.

== Gameplay ==
Virtual Pool 64 as the follow-up to the main series title Virtual Pool 2 retains the same different pool games, and adds new games, such as Rotation pool. The game features 11 different pool games: Eight-ball including American "bar pool" rules, British rules and APA league rules) Nine-ball including variations such as Three-ball, Six-ball and Ten-ball, as well as Straight, One-pocket, Bank and Rotation pool.

The game follows on from Virtual Pool 2, including additions such as a tournament mode, allowing the player to play through up-to a 32-man tournament with AI players, a trick shot mode, and three difficulty levels, amateur, professional and championship. The different levels of gameplay not only change the skill level of the opponent (who range from "pushover" to "vicious"), it will also change the size of the table and pockets for the table. It can also be played in "free play" mode, with no rules, or "shark-skins" mode requires you to clear a table of three, six, and nine balls in the fewest strokes possible.

== Reception ==
Reception

Aggregate score
Aggregator	Score
GameRankings	65%

Review scores
Publication	Score
Consoles +	87%
Electronic Gaming Monthly	6.625/10
Game Informer	7.75/10
GameFan	83%
GamePro	2/5
GameSpot	5.8/10
Hyper	80%
IGN	8/10
N64 Magazine	77%
Nintendo Power	7.4/10

Virtual Pool 64 received mixed reviews according to the review aggregation website GameRankings. Nintendo Power said the game's graphics had "ultra realism", but also said the number of controls were confusing. Jack Curtis of N64 Gamer said, "Celeris have created a very commendable pool game that remains true to its real-life counterpart", but that the game may have "limited lastability."

Robin Alway of Arcade Magazine said that "the only faults are those you'd associate with any 3D game." Peer Schneider of IGN was "impressed" by the games physics engine, and called the visuals "exceptionally sharp." However, he was not so impressed with the presentation, stating that VP64 "comes short in the presentation department. No characters, no sense of atmosphere"; and also critical of the game's soundtrack, with "extremely dated midi music."

Nelson Taruc of GameSpot said that the gameplay engine is "as close to the real thing as you'll find anywhere." Taruc also called the game's presentation as "excellent", when discussing the pool table and balls. However, he named games Pool Hustler and Backstreet Billiards as having more of an in-game incentive to play more, as the game does not have a clear career mode. Taruc even called the game "bland" and "boring", saying "it's the video game equivalent of a college textbook: great to learn from but not really exciting to read."
