= Virtual Pool: Tournament Edition =

2005 video game

- Developer: Celeris
- Publisher: Global Star Software
- Platform: Xbox
- Release: WW: May 11, 2005
- Genres: Sports simulation – snooker & pool
- Modes: Single-player, offline multiplayer

Virtual Pool: Tournament Edition is a sports simulation video game developed by Celeris and published by Global Star Software as an entry in the Virtual Pool franchise, a spin-off sequel to Virtual Pool 3. The game was initially released on Xbox with a planned PlayStation 2 version which was later cancelled.

== Gameplay ==
Virtual Pool: Tournament Edition features many of the same gameplay modes that were in the release of Virtual Pool 3, including 18 game modes. These modes include Snooker, 8-ball and 9-ball pool; but range to games like Honolulu and Bowliards.

The career game mode is the same one that would appear in Virtual Pool 4 as the "hustle career" mode, and also in Virtual Pool Mobile. This features a series of bar rooms where the player plays against the AI for money. Winning against each of the bosses in turn wins opens up the next room, where the player can eventually challenge "Curly", the game's end boss. Curly is introduced in game with a series of videos taunting the player between rooms.

== Reception ==
Reception

Aggregate scores
Aggregator	Score
GameRankings	61%
Metacritic	62%

Review score
Publication	Score
GameSpot	6.4/10

Virtual Pool: Tournament Edition received mixed review from critics. Metacritic and GameRankings scored the game at 62% and 61% respectively. with the biggest complaint of the game being its cost in comparison to the amount of in-game variety. Despite the variety of 18 game modes, some were not implemented to full potential.

Alex Navarro of GameSpot reviewed the game, stating that the Trick Shot mode, whilst fun, left them with "no explanation of how you're supposed to pull them off". The review also suggested the game was in need of a dedicated multiplayer mode. They ended by stating that "Virtual Pool is still a tough game to recommend."
