= Virtual Pool =

Series of video games developed by Celeris

- Virtual Pool 4 cover art
- Developer: Celeris
- Publishers: Interplay Productions; Crave Entertainment; Global Star Software; Celeris
- Platforms: Windows, MS-DOS Mac, PlayStation, Nintendo 64, Xbox, iOS, Android

Virtual Pool is a series of first-person cue sports video games developed by Celeris. The games in the series simulate pool, snooker and carom billiards with a focus on accuracy and improving the player's ability to play the sport in real life. Virtual Pool releases are sold with a money back guarantee to improve a player's external game.

== Overview ==
The main selling point of the Virtual Pool-series games is that they were designed and tested by programmers, physicists and professional players. According to the game box, its simulation was "guaranteed to improve your actual pool play or your money back". The series was endorsed by professional players Mike Sigel and Jeanette Lee and equipment manufacturers Viking Cues, Imperial International, Schön Custom Cues, Creative Innovations and Joss Cues.

The games' graphics capabilities vary by platform to platform, but their environmental realism (such as a pool hall) is on par with the graphics in other contemporary rendered games (like first-person shooters). The games' use of first-person perspective, rather than using an overhead view, contributed to the series' success.

The complexity of the games increased over time, from Virtual Pool's four game types to Virtual Pool 4's 18 pool games on championship and bar tables, snooker, English billiards, four carom games and four pub pool eight-ball games. Other improvements included more venues and computerized opponents, equipment-upgrade purchases, customizable tables, video tutorials, two career-play modes and a trick-shot library. Online capability includes pool rooms with multiple players and spectators, tournaments, ladders, a social network with player profiles, friends, statistics and shot uploads.

== Series ==
Release timeline
1995	Virtual Pool
1996	Virtual Snooker
1997	Virtual Pool 2
1998	Virtual Pool 64
1999	Virtual Pool Hall
2000	Virtual Pool 3
2001
2002
2003
2004
2005	Virtual Pool: Tournament Edition
2006
2007
2008
2009
2010	Virtual Pool Online HD
2011
2012	Virtual Pool Mobile
2012	Virtual Pool 4
2013
2014	Virtual Pool 4: Multiplayer

Celeris published their first 3D game, Virtual Pool, in 1995. The game has four modes: straight pool, eight-ball, nine-ball and rotation pool. With pool world champion Lou Butera, it guaranteed to improve the player's pool game (a guarantee which continued through the main-series Virtual Pool titles).

The game was successful, and Virtual Pool 2 (with a wider range of pool games, including three-ball and bank pool) was produced in 1997. Virtual Pool 2, with improved graphics, was released exclusively for PC. Over 120 AI opponents and online multiplayer capability were introduced, with Mike Sigil joining Butera for this game.

The following year's Virtual Pool Hall for Windows contained graphics and game modes similar to Virtual Pool 2 and features which would be retained in Virtual Pool 3, including a snooker mode (adapted from Virtual Snooker) and the series' first carom billiards mode. The game contained instructional videos similar to VP2's, performed by world champion Mike Sigel.

Virtual Pool 3 was released in 2000 for Windows, but was later ported to the PlayStation and PlayStation Network. VP3 includes snooker, carom, and billiards games in addition to pool. The game, endorsed by women's world champion Jeanette Lee, was released and distributed by Interplay Entertainment and Global Star Software. It received the highest Metacritic score of any main-series title.

More than eleven years after VP3, Virtual Pool 4 was released; in the interim, many patches were released for VP3. Virtual Pool 4 had two releases: a single-player and offline multiplayer version in 2012 and an online multiplayer variant, Virtual Pool 4 Multiplayer, in 2015. Virtual Pool 4 (in both versions) was later released on Steam after a period on Steam Greenlight. An iPad version was released in December 2015.

Virtual Pool 4 has mode and graphical upgrades from its previous incarnation (including snooker, billiards and pool modes) and the ability to change table size and handicaps for certain players. The game also has a trick shot mode, with standard trick shots and the ability to set up new ones.

=== Spin-off and ported games ===
Although it is primarily a game for IBM PC compatibles, console versions have been released. Celeris released Virtual Snooker, a snooker game with the same engine as Virtual Pool, in 1996. It contained only snooker games (no pool).

Screenshot of straight pool from the handheld Virtual Pool Mobile

After the release of Virtual Pool 2, Celeris worked with VR Sports to produce a game for the Nintendo 64. The game was released in 1998 as Virtual Pool 64, using the same naming convention as Super Mario 64, and Goldeneye 64. With gameplay and modes similar to Virtual Pool 2, it was condensed to fit on a cartridge.

The series' first Xbox console version, Virtual Pool: Tournament Edition (ported by Ingram Entertainment), was released in 2006. It contained a career mode which would later develop into the hustle-tour mode in Virtual Pool 4, the iPad and iPhone game Virtual Pool Online HD (ported by Fried Green Apps in 2010) andVirtual Pool Mobile, an Android 2.2+ version released in 2012 by Celeris.

=== Releases ===
Games by year, publisher, and platform
Title	Year	Publisher	Platform(s)		
Title	Year	Publisher	Console	Computer	Mobile
Virtual Pool	1995	Interplay Productions	PlayStation	MS-DOS, Windows, Mac	
Virtual Snooker	1996	Interplay Productions		MS-DOS, Windows	
Virtual Pool 2	1997	VR Sports		Windows	
Virtual Pool 64	1998	Crave Entertainment	Nintendo 64		
Virtual Pool Hall	1999	Interplay Software		Windows	
Virtual Pool 3	2000	Interplay Entertainment; Global Star Software	PlayStation, PlayStation 3 (Note: The game was released originally for PlayStation in 2003, but was later released on PSN in 2010 for PlayStation 3)	Windows	
Virtual Pool: Tournament Edition	2005	Global Star Software	Xbox		
Virtual Pool Mobile	2012	Interplay Entertainment			iPhone, (Note: Known as Virtual Pool Online, or Virtual Pool HD.) iPad & Android
Virtual Pool 4	2012	Celeris		Windows	iPad

== Reception ==
Aggregate review scores
Game	Year	GameRankings	Metacritic
Virtual Pool	1995	75%	
Virtual Snooker	1996	67%	
Virtual Pool 2	1997	73%	
Virtual Pool 64	1998	65%	
Virtual Pool Hall	1999	78%	
Virtual Pool 3	2000	85%	82%
Virtual Pool: Tournament Edition	2006	61%	62%

The Virtual Pool series has received a moderate-to-good reception from critics, with Virtual Pool 3 the highest-rated game. A GameSpot review of Virtual Pool Hall praised its game mechanics, particularly the ball-collision physics. Virtual Pool 2 received a perfect score (100) from the German PC Player magazine. However, some reviews of the series called the games "boring" due to the nature of pool simulation.

=== Awards ===
Virtual Pool was voted the Best Sports Game of 1995 by PC Gamer US and the 1995 Game of the Year by Games magazine. Virtual Pool 2 was a finalist for the Academy of Interactive Arts & Sciences' 1997 Personal Computer Sports Game of the Year award, which was won by FIFA: Road to World Cup 98.
