= 1994 Mosconi Cup =

Nine-ball pool competition

- Dates: 15–18 December
- Venue: Roller Bowl
- Location: Romford, London, England
- 12 – 16 United States wins the Mosconi Cup

The 1994 Miller Pilsner Mosconi Cup, the inaugural edition of the annual nine-ball pool competition between teams representing Europe and the United States, took place 15–18 December 1994 at the Roller Bowl in Romford, London, England.

Team USA won the Mosconi Cup by defeating Team Europe 16–12.

== Teams ==
Team USA
Name	Nationality of birth	Notes
Lou Butera	United States
Paul Gerni	United States
Bobby Hunter	United States
Dallas West	United States
Mark Wilson	United States
Mike Gulyassy	United States
Jeanette Lee	United States
Vivian Villarreal	United States

Team Europe
Name	Nationality	Notes
Ralf Souquet	Germany
Steve Davis	United Kingdom
Lee Tucker	United Kingdom
Oliver Ortmann	Germany
Tom Storm	Sweden
Jimmy White	United Kingdom
Franziska Stark	Germany
Allison Fisher	United Kingdom

== Results ==
=== Thursday, 15 December ===
==== Session 1 ====
	Results
Singles; Tom Storm	2–0 (3–1, 3–0)	Singles; Bobby Hunter
Singles; Oliver Ortmann	2–0 (3–1, 3–1)	Singles; Mark Wilson
Singles; Lee Tucker	1–2 (1–3, 3–0, 4–5)	Singles; Lou Butera
Singles; Allison Fisher	0–2 (1–3, 0–3)	Singles; Vivian Villarreal
2	Session	2
2	Overall	2

==== Session 2 ====
	Results
Singles; Steve Davis	2–1 (0–3, 4–2, 4–2)	Singles; Mike Gulyassy
Singles; Tom Storm	2–0 (5–4, 4–2)	Singles; Lou Butera
Doubles; Ralf Souquet; Franziska Stark	0–2 (3–5, 1–3)	Doubles; Dallas West; Vivian Villarreal
2	Session	1
4	Overall	3

=== Friday, 16 December ===
==== Session 3 ====
	Results
Singles; Lee Tucker	2–0 (3–0, 4–2)	Singles; Mark Wilson
Singles; Franziska Stark	1–2 (3–1, 1–3, 1–3)	Singles; Vivian Villarreal
Singles; Ralf Souquet	2–0 (3–1, 4–2)	Singles; Dallas West
Doubles; Oliver Ortmann; Allison Fisher	0–2 (3–5, 1–3)	Doubles; Bobby Hunter; Jeanette Lee
2	Session	2
6	Overall	5

==== Session 4 ====
	Results
Singles; Tom Storm	2–1 (0–3, 3–1, 3–0)	Singles; Dallas West
Singles; Jimmy White	2–0 (3–0, 3–0)	Singles; Paul Gerni
Doubles; Franziska Stark; Allison Fisher	0–2 (0–3, 3–5)	Doubles; Jeanette Lee; Vivian Villarreal
Singles; Ralf Souquet	2–0 (3–0, 3–1)	Singles; Bobby Hunter
3	Session	1
9	Overall	6

=== Saturday, 17 December ===
==== Session 5 ====
	Results
Singles; Steve Davis	1–2 (4–2, 4–5, 1–3)	Singles; Lou Butera
Singles; Franziska Stark	0–2 (0–3, 1–3)	Singles; Jeanette Lee
0	Session	2
9	Overall	8

==== Session 6 ====
	Results
Singles; Jimmy White	0–2 (3–5, 0–3)	Singles; Lou Butera
Singles; Steve Davis	1–2 (3–5, 3–1, 0–3)	Singles; Jeanette Lee
Singles; Lee Tucker	0–2 (1–3, 4–5)	Singles; Vivian Villarreal
0	Session	3
9	Overall	11

=== Sunday, 18 December ===
==== Session 7 ====
	Results
Singles; Steve Davis	2–1 (5–4, 2–4, 3–0)	Singles; Paul Gerni
Singles; Oliver Ortmann	1–2 (1–3, 3–1, 0–3)	Singles; Dallas West
Singles; Tom Storm	0–2 (1–3, 0–3)	Singles; Mark Wilson
1	Session	2
10	Overall	13

==== Session 8 ====
	Results
Singles; Oliver Ortmann	2–0 (5–3, 3–1)	Singles; Bobby Hunter
Singles; Jimmy White	1–2 (0–3, 5–4, 0–3)	Singles; Mike Gulyassy
Doubles; Ralf Souquet; Franziska Stark	1–2 (2–4, 5–4, 0–3)	Doubles; Bobby Hunter; Jeanette Lee
Singles; Lee Tucker	2–0 (3–0, 3–1)	Singles; Paul Gerni
Doubles; Jimmy White; Steve Davis	0–2 (0–3, 1–3)	Doubles; Mark Wilson; Lou Butera
2	Session	3
12	Overall	16
