= 1995 Mosconi Cup =

Nine-ball pool competition

- Dates: 7–10 December
- Venue: Festival Hall
- Location: Basildon, England
- 16 – 15 Europe wins the Mosconi Cup

The 1995 Interplay Mosconi Cup, the second edition of the annual nine-ball pool competition between teams representing Europe and the United States, took place 7–10 December 1995 at the Festival Hall in Basildon, England.

Team Europe won the Mosconi Cup by defeating Team USA 16–15.

== Teams ==
Team USA
Name	Nationality	Notes
Lou Butera	United States
Mike Massey	United States
Bobby Hunter	United States
Dallas West	United States
Mark Wilson	United States
Mike Gulyassy	United States
John DiToro	United States

Team Europe
Name	Nationality	Notes
Daryl Peach	England
Steve Davis	England
Alex Higgins	Northern Ireland
Lee Kendall	England
Oliver Ortmann	Germany
Tom Storm	Sweden
Jimmy White	England

== Results ==
=== Thursday, 7 December ===
==== Session 1 ====
	Results
Singles; Steve Davis	2–0 (3–1, 5–4)	Singles; Mike Massey
Singles; Daryl Peach	1–2 (5–4, 2–4, 4–5)	Singles; Bobby Hunter
Singles; Oliver Ortmann	0–2 (2–4, 0–3)	Singles; Mike Gulyassy
1	Session	2
1	Overall	2

==== Session 2 ====
	Results
Singles; Jimmy White	0–2 (2–4, 1–3)	Singles; John DiToro
Singles; Oliver Ortmann	2–0 (3–0, 3–0)	Singles; Lou Butera
Singles; Tom Storm	2–1 (5–4, 2–4, 5–4)	Singles; Mark Wilson
Singles; Lee Kendall	0–2 (2–4, 3–5)	Singles; Bobby Hunter
2	Session	2
3	Overall	4

=== Friday, 8 December ===
==== Session 3 ====
	Results
Singles; Tom Storm	2–1 (2–4, 4–2, 5–4)	Singles; Lou Butera
Doubles; Daryl Peach; Alex Higgins	0–2 (0–3, 1–3)	Doubles; Dallas West; Mike Massey
Singles; Lee Kendall	1–2 (3–1,1–3,1–3)	Singles; Mark Wilson
1	Session	2
4	Overall	6

==== Session 4 ====
	Results
Doubles; Oliver Ortmann; Tom Storm	2–0 (5–3, 3–0)	Doubles; Mike Gulyassy; John DiToro
Singles; Alex Higgins	0–2 (1–3, 0–3)	Singles; Bobby Hunter
Singles; Daryl Peach	2–0 (3–1, 3–0)	Singles; Mark Wilson
Singles; Lee Kendall	2–1 (1–3, 4–2, 5–3)	Singles; Dallas West
3	Session	1
7	Overall	7

=== Saturday, 9 December ===
==== Session 5 ====
	Results
Singles; Steve Davis	2–1 (3–0, 2–4, 4–2)	Singles; Lou Butera
Singles; Daryl Peach	1–2 (3–1, 2–4, 0–3)	Singles; John DiToro
Singles; Tom Storm	0–2 (0–3, 1–3)	Singles; Mike Massey
1	Session	2
8	Overall	9

==== Session 6 ====
	Results
Singles; Steve Davis	1–2 (4–5, 5–3, 2–4)	Singles; Mike Gulyassy
Doubles; Jimmy White; Alex Higgins	2–1 (3–1, 2–4, 3–0)	Doubles; Bobby Hunter; Mike Massey
Singles; Oliver Ortmann	2–0 (3–0, 3–0)	Singles; Dallas West
2	Session	1
10	Overall	10

=== Sunday, 10 December ===
==== Session 7 ====
	Results
Singles; Daryl Peach	2–0 (3–0, 3–0)	Singles; Mike Massey
Singles; Steve Davis	2–1 (4–2, 3–5, 3–0)	Singles; John DiToro
Singles; Oliver Ortmann	2–0 (3–0, 3–1)	Singles; Mark Wilson
Doubles; Lee Kendall; Tom Storm	2–1 (1–3, 5–4, 4–2)	Doubles; Mike Massey; Mike Gulyassy
4	Session	0
14	Overall	10

==== Session 8 ====
	Results
Singles; Oliver Ortmann	2–0 (5–3, 3–1)	Singles; Bobby Hunter
Doubles; Jimmy White; Alex Higgins	0–2 (2–4, 1–3)	Doubles; Lou Butera; John DiToro
Singles; Tom Storm	0–2 (1–3, 0–3)	Singles; Dallas West
Singles; Daryl Peach	1–2 (5–3, 4–5, 1–3)	Singles; Lou Butera
Doubles; Tom Storm; Oliver Ortmann	1–2 (0–3, 3–0, 4–5)	Doubles; Bobby Hunter; Mark Wilson
Doubles; Lee Kendall; Steve Davis	0–2 (0–3, 2–4)	Doubles; Dallas West; Mike Gulyassy
Singles; Jimmy White	1–0 (4–2)	Singles; Lou Butera
2	Session	5
16	Overall	15
