= World Team Championship =

World Team Championship may refer to:

- World Team Championship (pool) (2010–2014), the world team pool championship for Eight-ball, Nine-ball and Ten-ball
- World Team Cup in tennis
- Chess Olympiad
- World Team Chess Championship
- Bermuda Bowl of contract bridge for the Open series in the World Bridge Team Championships
- Venice Cup of contract bridge for the Women's series in the World Bridge Team Championships
