= 1996 Mosconi Cup =

Nine-ball pool competition

- Dates: 19–22 December
- Venue: Goresbrook Leisure Centre
- Location: Dagenham, London, England
- 13 – 15 United States wins the Mosconi Cup

The 1996 Dr Martens Mosconi Cup, the third edition of the annual nine-ball pool competition between teams representing Europe and the United States, took place 19–22 December 1996 at the Goresbrook Leisure Centre in Dagenham, London, England.

Team USA won the Mosconi Cup by defeating Team Europe 15–13.

== Teams ==
Team USA
Name	State of birth	Notes
Earl Strickland	North Carolina
Mike Massey	Tennessee
C.J. Wiley	Texas
Roger Griffis	Texas
Shannon Daulton	Kentucky
Allen Hopkins	New Jersey
Danny Harriman	Maryland

Team Europe
Name	Nationality	Notes
Steve Davis	United Kingdom
Vincent Facquet	France
Ralf Souquet	Germany
Oliver Ortmann	Germany
Mika Immonen	Finland
Ronnie O'Sullivan	United Kingdom
Andy Richardson	United Kingdom

== Results ==
=== Thursday, 19 December ===
==== Session 1 ====
	Results
Singles; Steve Davis	0–2 (0–3, 4–5)	Singles; Shannon Daulton
Singles; Andy Richardson	1–2 (2–4, 3–0, 1–3)	Singles; Allen Hopkins
Singles; Mika Immonen	2–0 (4–2, 5–3)	Singles; Roger Griffis
1	Session	2
1	Overall	2

==== Session 2 ====
	Results
Singles; Vincent Facquet	0–2 (0–3, 1–3)	Singles; Danny Harriman
Singles; Ralf Souquet	2–0 (3–0, 3–0)	Singles; C.J. Wiley
Singles; Oliver Ortmann	2–1 (3–0, 2–4, 4–2)	Singles; Earl Strickland
Singles; Steve Davis	2–1 (1–3, 5–3, 3–1)	Singles; Mike Massey
3	Session	1
4	Overall	3

=== Friday, 20 December ===
==== Session 3 ====
	Results
Singles; Oliver Ortmann	0–2 (0–3, 1–3)	Singles; Roger Griffis
Doubles; Mika Immonen; Vincent Facquet	2–0 (4–2, 5–3)	Doubles; Allen Hopkins; Mike Massey
Singles; Steve Davis	2–1 (0–3, 4–2, 3–1)	Singles; Danny Harriman
2	Session	1
6	Overall	4

==== Session 4 ====
	Results
Singles; Andy Richardson	0–2 (0–3, 0–3)	Singles; C.J. Wiley
Doubles; Ralf Souquet; Oliver Ortmann	2–0 (3–0, 3–1)	Doubles; Danny Harriman; Shannon Daulton
Singles; Mika Immonen	0–2 (2–4, 0–3)	Singles; Earl Strickland
Singles; Ronnie O'Sullivan	2–1 (2–4, 3–1, 3–0)	Singles; Allen Hopkins
2	Session	2
8	Overall	6

=== Saturday, 21 December ===
==== Session 5 ====
	Results
Singles; Andy Richardson	2–1 (1–3, 3–0, 3–1)	Singles; Danny Harriman
Singles; Ralf Souquet	2–0 (4–2, 3–0)	Singles; Roger Griffis
Singles; Steve Davis	0–2 (2–4, 2–4)	Singles; C.J. Wiley
2	Session	1
10	Overall	7

==== Session 6 ====
	Results
Singles; Mika Immonen	2–1 (1–3, 3–0, 3–1)	Singles; Mike Massey
Singles; Vincent Facquet	0–2 (0–3, 0–3)	Singles; Shannon Daulton
Singles; Oliver Ortmann	1–2 (3–0, 0–3, 1–3)	Singles; Allen Hopkins
Singles; Ronnie O'Sullivan	2–1 (1–3, 4–2, 3–1)	Singles; Earl Strickland
2	Session	2
12	Overall	9

=== Sunday, 22 December ===
==== Session 7 ====
	Results
Singles; Ralf Souquet	0–2 (1–3, 3–5)	Singles; C.J. Wiley
Singles; Andy Richardson	0–2 (1–3, 2–4)	Singles; Roger Griffis
Singles; Ronnie O'Sullivan	1–2 (3–1, 1–3, 2–4)	Singles; Mike Massey
Singles; Mika Immonen	0–1 (4–5)	Singles; Shannon Daulton
0	Session	4
12	Overall	13

==== Session 8 ====
	Results
Singles; Ralf Souquet	1–0 (3–1)	Singles; Earl Strickland
Singles; Oliver Ortmann	0–1 (1–3)	Singles; Shannon Daulton
Doubles; Steve Davis; Ronnie O'Sullivan	0–1 (4–5)	Doubles; Earl Strickland; C.J. Wiley
1	Session	2
13	Overall	15
