= Oliver Ortmann =

German pool player (born 1967)

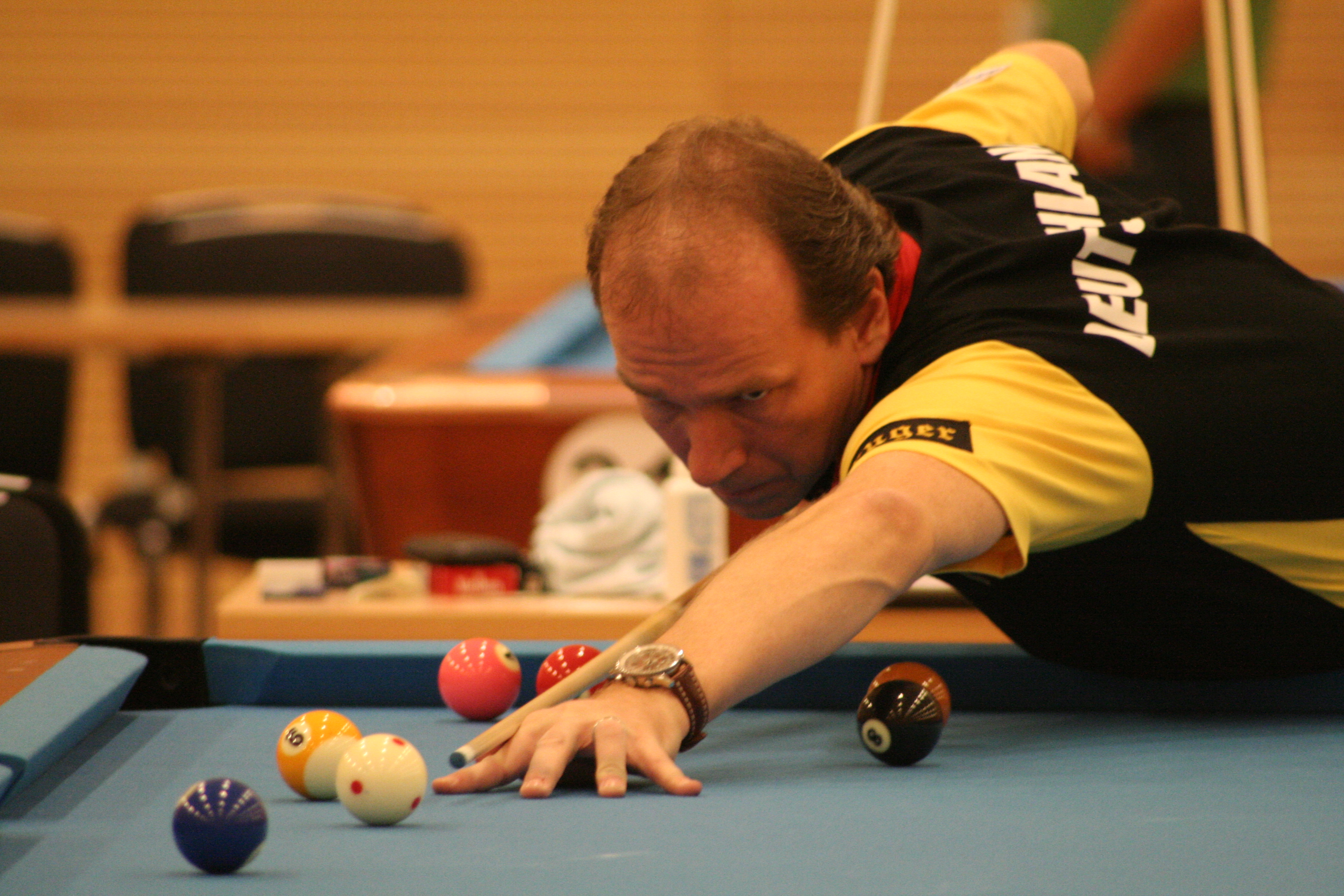
- Ortmann at the European Pool Championship 2008 in Willingen

Personal information
- Nickname: "The Machine"
- Born: 11 June 1967 (age 59) Gelsenkirchen

Pool career
- Country: Germany
- Pool games: Nine-ball, Straight pool

Tournament wins
- World Champion: Nine-ball (1995), Straight pool (2007, 2010)
- Highest rank: 1

Oliver Ortmann (born 11 June 1967) is a German professional pool player from Gelsenkirchen. Ortmann is a three-time world champion, winning the 1995 WPA World Nine-ball Championship and the 2007 and 2010 World Straight Pool Championship. Ortmann became the second player (after Earl Strickland) to win three WPA world championships. With fourteen wins, he the second most successful player (after Ralf Souquet) at the European Pool Championships. Ortmann is also the second most successful player (after Ralf Souquet) on the Euro Tour, winning fourteen events. Ortmann was the first non-American player to win the BCA U.S. Open Straight Pool Championship, in 1989.

He has represented Europe eight times in the annual Mosconi Cup competition between 1994 and 2004, and was on the winning side in 1995 and 2002. With 44 German national medals and 16 German Pool Championships, Ortmann is one of the most successful German pool players of all time. In 1996, he was the first cue sports player to receive the Silbernes Lorbeerblatt, the highest sporting award given in Germany. In 2014, Ortmann was inducted into the Billiard Congress of America Hall of Fame.

== Career ==
=== Early career ===
Ortmann was born and raised in Gelsenkirchen, Germany. At age six he began playing on a pool table in the basement of his parents' restaurant. Ortmann won his first championship in 1985 at age 17 (the 8-Ball Junior European championships), defeating Sweden's Per Anda in the final. The following year he won his first German national championship (the straight pool championship), after meeting Thomas Engert in the final. Ortmann did vocational education as power plant electronics engineer in Munich to become an electronics technician, and at age 20 he became the manager of a billiard centre with 80 pool and billiard tables.

He was the first player from Europe to win the BCA U.S. Open Straight Pool Championship in 1989. He won the event despite it being his first trip outside of Europe. As a relative unknown, Ortmann defeated Steve Mizerak in the final. Ortmann also won his first of numerous European Pool Championship events that year, beating Waldemar Markert in the straight-pool final.

=== Professional career (1993–2010) ===
He entered his first Euro Tour event in 1993, finishing second at that year's German Open and winning the following events in Austria and Hungary. Ortmann won his second BCA U.S. Open Straight Pool Championship later that year. He won five Euro Tour events the following year (four in a row), and finished second twice. During the nine-event season, Ortmann reached the finals seven times. He won his first world championship (the 1995 WPA World Nine-ball Championship), playing the American Dallas West in the final.

In 1996, Ortmann was the first cue-sports player to receive the Silbernes Lorbeerblatt; fellow pool player Ralf Souquet won the award the following year. Ortmann won the winner-take-all International Challenge of Champions event in 1997. He was runner-up two years later, losing the final to Francisco Bustamante. In 2000, however, Ortmann defeated Bustamante in the final for his second championship.

Ortmann formed Ortmann Billiards, a pool-product manufacturer and retailer, in 2004. Although the company specializes in cue sports such as pool, snooker and carrom, it also supports air hockey, darts and poker. Ortmann reached the final of the 2004 World Pool Masters, but was defeated 6–8 by Thomas Engert. Two years later, he joined the International Pool Tour and continued competing in events sanctioned by other organizations. Ortmann won the 2007 WPA World Straight Pool Championship, defeating Danny Barouty 200–56, Dennis Orcollo 200–7, and Danny Harriman 200–123 to reach the final. There, he defeated Huidji See 200–171 for his second world championship. Ortmann made the tournament's third-highest run, a 131. He also played in the 2007 World Pool Masters, defeating Naoyuki Ōi 8–3 in the first round before losing 3–8 in the quarter-finals to David Alcaide.

Ortmann reached the quarter-finals of the 2008 world straight pool championship (which he won the previous year) before losing to Jasmin Ouschan 133–200. He progressed to the semifinals the following year, defeating Earl Herring and Jonni Fulcher before losing to Mika Immonen. Ortmann won his third world championship in 2010, defeating Immonen in the straight-pool final. Since the straight-pool tournament (also known as the World Tournament) is no longer sanctioned by the WPA, Ortmann remains the last official world straight-pool champion. He is the second player to win three world championships, after Earl Strickland (who won the nine-ball championship in 1990, 1991 and 2002).

=== Later career (2010–present) ===
Ortmann reached the semifinals of the 2010 World Pool Masters in May of that year, defeating Darren Appleton, Thorsten Hohmann and Thomas Engert before losing 3–8 to Toru Kuribayashi. He entered the 2011 WPA World Eight-ball Championship and defeated Mika Immonen 7–2 in the double-elimination round before losing in the round of 32 to Ronato Alcano. Ortmann defeated Lo Li-wen in the first knockout round, followed by Nick van den Berg and Li Hewen, before losing to eventual champion Chang Jung-Lin the following year.

His Euro Tour wins include the 2009 Netherlands Open. This victory, Ortmann's 14th on the tour, placed him second on the all-time list of winners behind Ralf Souquet (23). He has reached the semifinals of a tour event 35 times, with eight second-place finishes. In 2014, Ortmann was inducted into the Billiard Congress of America Hall of Fame with promoter and historian Charles Ursitti. He is a three-time European player of the year, receiving the award in 1990, 1993, and 1996.

=== Team events ===
Ortmann first represented Europe at the Mosconi Cup in the first competition in 1994 with the United States winning 16–12. The following year, Ortmann competed in the Continent's first win, and Ortmann was also on the winning side in 2002. The 2002 victory with Ortmann was described by six-time snooker world champion Steve Davis as "one of the best moments of my career". Ortmann competed in the team on eight occasions (1994, 1995, 1996, 1997, 1998, 1999, 2002, 2004), and was the non-playing captain in 2003. Ortmann's eight appearances is the fifth most of any European player.

At the World Cup of Pool, Ortmann has represented Germany three times. He and Thomas Engert reached the 2006 semifinals, losing to eventual winners Efren Reyes and Francisco Bustamante of the Philippines. In 2007, Ortmann and Christian Reimering lost in the first round to Singapore's Chan Keng Kwang and Toh Lian Han. He and Ralf Souquet reached the 2010 semifinals, where they were defeated by eventual winners Li Hewen and Fu Jianbo of China. Ortmann appeared at the World Team Championship in 2010 and 2012, reaching the quarter-finals in 2010.

== Career titles ==
- 2014 Billiard Congress of America Hall of Fame
- 2011 German Pool Championship 14.1
- 2011 German Pool Championship 9-Ball
- 2010 WPA World Straight Pool Championship
- 2009 Euro Tour Netherlands Open
- 2007 European Pool Championship 8-Ball
- 2007 Open Weert 9-Ball Scotch Doubles
- 2007 WPA World Straight Pool Championship
- 2006 German Pool Championship 9-Ball
- 2006 European Pool Championship 8-Ball
- 2006 German Pool Championship 14.1
- 2006 European Pool Championship 14.1
- 2005 German Pool Championship 14.1
- 2004 Euro Tour German Open
- 2003 Rockport WPB Continental Team Cup
- 2003 European Pool Championship 9-Ball
- 2003 German Pool Championship 9-Ball
- 2002 Mosconi Cup
- 2002 European Pool Championship 9-Ball
- 2001 German Pool Championship 14.1
- 2000 International Challenge of Champions
- 2000 European Pool Championship 14.1
- 2000 Euro Tour Finland Open
- 1999 European Pool Championship 9-Ball
- 1999 German Pool Championship 14.1
- 1998 Euro Tour Netherlands Open
- 1998 German Pool Championship 9-Ball
- 1998 ESPN Ultimate 9-Ball Challenge
- 1997 International Challenge of Champions
- 1997 German Pool Championship 9-Ball
- 1996 Silbernes Lorbeerblatt Sports Award
- 1996 European Player of the Year
- 1996 Euro Tour Sweden Open
- 1996 European Pool Championship 9-Ball
- 1996 Euro Tour Czechia Open
- 1996 European Pool Championship 8-Ball
- 1995 Mosconi Cup
- 1995 Euro Tour Czechia Open
- 1995 WPA World Nine-ball Championship
- 1995 German Pool Championship 14.1
- 1994 European Pool Championships 9-Ball
- 1994 Euro Tour Swiss Open
- 1994 Euro Tour Netherlands Open
- 1994 Euro Tour Swedish Open
- 1994 Euro Tour Greece Open
- 1994 Euro Tour French Open
- 1993 European Player of the Year
- 1993 BCA U.S. Open Straight Pool Championship
- 1993 Euro Tour Hungarian Open
- 1993 European Pool Championship 9-Ball
- 1993 German Pool Championship 14.1
- 1993 Euro Tour Austrian Open
- 1992 German Pool Championship 14.1
- 1991 German Pool Championship 14.1
- 1990 European Player of the Year
- 1990 European Pool Championship 14.1
- 1989 German Pool Championship 14.1
- 1989 European Pool Championship 14.1
- 1989 BCA U.S. Open Straight Pool Championship
- 1987 European Pool Championship 14.1
- 1986 German Pool Championship 14.1
