= Three-ball (disambiguation) =

Three-ball, threeball, 3 ball, or 3-ball may refer to:

== Billiards ==
- Three-ball, a pool (pocket billiards) game played with three object balls
- 3 ball, the pool (pocket billiards) ball numbered "3" and colored red
- 3 ball, the green snooker ball, worth 3 points, normally referred to as "the green"
- Three-cushion billiards, a pocketless, carom billiards game, sometimes incorrectly referred to as three-ball

== Other uses ==
- 3-ball, a three-dimensional n-ball in mathematics
- Slang term for three-point field goal, a basketball shot that is worth three points
- The traditional three-ball symbol for a pawnbroker
