= 1996 WPA World Nine-ball Championship =

WPA World 9-ball Championship 1996
Tournament information
- Sport: 9-ball
- Location: Borlänge, Sweden
- Dates: October 23, 1996–October 27, 1996
- Tournament format: Round robin / Single Elimination
- Host: WPA World Nine-ball Championship
- Participants: 64

Final positions
- Champion: (Germany) Ralf Souquet
- Runner-up: (Sweden) Tom Storm

The 1996 WPA World Nine-ball Championship was a professional pool championship that took place in 1996 in Borlänge, Sweden. The event was won by Germany's Ralf Souquet, who defeated Sweden's Tom Storm in the final 11–1. Defending champion Oliver Ortmann was defeated in the semi-finals 13-8 by Storm.

== Knockout stages ==
The following is the results from the quarter-finals. Players competing had progressed through the earlier knockout round. Players in bold denote match winners. Matches were race-to-13-racks until the final match was race-to-11-racks due to televising purposes.

Quarterfinals
(Germany) Oliver Ortmann	8
**(Sweden) Tom Storm**	13
(Germany) Thomas Engert	3
**(Germany) Rolf Alex**	13
(Canada) Paul Potier	3
**(Germany) Ralf Souquet**	13
**(Australia) Craig Duffy**	13
(Japan) Takeshi Okumura	11

Semifinals
**(Sweden) Tom Storm**	13
(Germany) Rolf Alex	10
**(Germany) Ralf Souquet**	13
(Australia) Craig Duffy	10

Finals
(Sweden) Tom Storm	1
**(Germany) Ralf Souquet**	11
