= 2002 Mosconi Cup =

European vs USA pool event, December 2002

- Dates: 19–22 December
- Venue: York Hall
- Location: Bethnal Green, London, England
- 12 – 9 Europe wins the Mosconi Cup

The 2002 Ladbrokes.com Mosconi Cup, the ninth edition of the annual nine-ball pool competition between teams representing Europe and the United States, took place 19–22 December 2002 at the York Hall in Bethnal Green, London, England.

Team Europe won the Mosconi Cup for the first time since 1995 by defeating Team USA 12–9.

== Teams ==
Team USA
Name	State of birth	Notes
Johnny Archer	Georgia
Nick Varner	Kentucky
Jeremy Jones	Texas
Corey Deuel	California
Earl Strickland	North Carolina
Charlie Williams	South Korea^{1}

Team Europe
Name	Nationality	Notes
Oliver Ortmann	Germany
Mika Immonen	Finland
Ralf Souquet	Germany
Nick van den Berg	Netherlands
Marcus Chamat	Sweden
Steve Davis	United Kingdom

- ^{1} Born outside the United States.

== Results ==
=== Thursday, 19 December ===
==== Session 1 ====
	Results
Doubles; Oliver Ortmann; Ralf Souquet	5–2	Doubles; Johnny Archer; Nick Varner
Doubles; Mika Immonen; Marcus Chamat	5–1	Doubles; Corey Deuel; Charlie Williams
Doubles; Steve Davis; Nick van den Berg	5–4	Doubles; Earl Strickland; Jeremy Jones
3	Session	0
3	Overall	0

=== Friday, 20 December ===
==== Session 2 ====
	Results
Doubles; Oliver Ortmann; Ralf Souquet	1–5	Doubles; Corey Deuel; Charlie Williams
Doubles; Mika Immonen; Marcus Chamat	5–2	Doubles; Johnny Archer; Nick Varner
Doubles; Steve Davis; Nick van den Berg	5–0	Doubles; Earl Strickland; Jeremy Jones
2	Session	1
5	Overall	1

==== Session 3 ====
	Results
Singles; Marcus Chamat	2–5	Singles; Earl Strickland
Singles; Nick van den Berg	1–5	Singles; Corey Deuel
Singles; Mika Immonen	2–5	Singles; Charlie Williams
0	Session	3
5	Overall	4

=== Saturday, 21 December ===
==== Session 4 ====
	Results
Doubles; Marcus Chamat; Mika Immonen	5–0	Doubles; Corey Deuel; Charlie Williams
Doubles; Oliver Ortmann; Ralf Souquet	1–5	Doubles; Earl Strickland; Jeremy Jones
Doubles; Steve Davis; Nick van den Berg	4–5	Doubles; Johnny Archer; Nick Varner
1	Session	2
6	Overall	6

==== Session 5 ====
	Results
Singles; Ralf Souquet	5–4	Singles; Jeremy Jones
Singles; Oliver Ortmann	0–5	Singles; Johnny Archer
Singles; Steve Davis	5–3	Singles; Nick Varner
2	Session	1
8	Overall	7

=== Sunday, 22 December ===
==== Session 6 ====
	Results
Singles; Oliver Ortmann	5–2	Singles; Johnny Archer
Singles; Mika Immonen	4–5	Singles; Jeremy Jones
Singles; Nick van den Berg	5–3	Singles; Corey Deuel
2	Session	1
10	Overall	8

==== Session 7 ====
	Results
Singles; Marcus Chamat	5–2	Singles; Nick Varner
Singles; Ralf Souquet	3–5	Singles; Charlie Williams
Singles; Steve Davis	5–4	Singles; Earl Strickland
2	Session	1
12	Overall	9
