= Virtual Pool 3 =

2000 video game

- Windows box art
- Developer: Celeris
- Publishers: Digital Mayhem (PC); XS Games (PS)
- Series: Virtual Pool
- Platforms: Windows; PlayStation
- Release: Windows: NA: November 7, 2000; UK: December 1, 2000; PlayStation: NA: August 11, 2003; PlayStation Network: NA: November 2, 2010
- Genre: Sports (cue sports)
- Modes: Single-player, multiplayer

Virtual Pool 3 is a 3D, first-person sports video game that simulates various cue sports, developed and released for Windows and PlayStation by Celeris. The game features 15 pool disciplines, snooker, and two varieties of carom billiards.

== Overview ==
The Virtual Pool series made its debut in 1995 with the release by Interplay of Virtual Pool. Interplay went on to produce Virtual Pool 2 in November 1997, adding improvements including enhanced physics modeling and a handful of new game types. Virtual Pool Hall followed in December 1999, introducing snooker to the series. Virtual Pool Hall suffered from poor opponent AI and a lack of a pool hall atmosphere.

Initially, Virtual Pool 3 was released as a retail boxed version endorsed by champion pool player Jeanette Lee. The latest version is available on the Celeris site as a download and is supported via downloadable update patches.

A Dreamcast version was referenced in the official Sega press kit for E3 2000 but did not materialise.

== Gameplay ==
Nine-ball in Virtual Pool 3 single-player mode

The game can be played in single-player mode against the computer (Career Mode, Tournament or Quick Play), or against other human opponents on the Internet or locally through a LAN.

The game features eight billiard venues the player can choose from, which include six pool tables, a snooker table, and a carom table for cushion caroms or three-cushion billiards. There are three preset table configurations available for all games (championship, professional, and amateur), but any table can be customized for roll speed and pocket dimensions.

Twenty-one variations are featured in the game, and most options simulate popular games including nine-ball, eight-ball, and straight pool, as well as snooker, and three-cushion, the inclusion of uncommon variations such as cowboy pool, Honolulu, and bowliards allows players to try out game for which finding real-life opponents might be difficult.

The disciplines featured in Virtual Pool 3 are as it follows:

- Snooker
- Nine-ball
- Straight pool
- Eight-ball – league
- Eight-ball – midwest
- Eight-ball – bar
- Eight-ball – pub
- Ten-ball
- Six-Ball
- Three-ball
- One-pocket
- Rotation
- Bank pool
- Honolulu
- Cowboy pool
- Bowliards
- Cribbage pool
- Fifteen-ball
- Basic pocket billiards
- Cushion caroms (one-cushion carom billiards)
- Three-cushion billiards

== Online play ==
Beginning a frame of snooker online

Players use the GameSpy Arcade client to access the game's main lobby and then create or join virtual rooms where they can participate in online play.

- Challenge Mode creates a winner-stays-on style of play where the creator of the room selects the game and table.
- Normal Mode allows the player to create a room where he, or the previous match winner can set the game type, table and players who play.

The Virtual International Players Ladder (VIPLadder) is a perpetual league for players of games in the Virtual Pool franchise. Players compete in matches to earn points from other VIP Ladder players. As players earn points, they move up the ladder.

Besides other normal leagues ending with playoffs (like the Eight-ball Pub League), there are several regular weekly online tournaments that every player can attend. Each tournament usually takes a few hours, but some more prestigious events such as the Virtual 9 Ball World Championships and the Virtual Snooker World Championships can take several days or weeks to complete.

== Reception ==
Reception

Aggregate scores
Aggregator	Score
GameRankings	85%
Metacritic	82%

Review scores
Publication	Score
GameSpot	8.7/10
IGN	8.5/10
PC Zone UK	8.5/10
PC Gamer	8.5/10

Virtual Pool 3 was mostly very well received by critics, with an average score of 85% at GameRankings, which makes it the highest rated billiards game on Windows, as of 2007. industry standard video game aggregator website Metacritic also scored the game well, at another franchise high rating of 82 out of 100.

GameSpot rated the game highly, with an 8.7 out of 10 rating, particularly citing the "gorgeous" visuals as well as the "better ball physics and better online support" than the previous titles in the series. However, GameSpot did find that it was "disappointing" that the players were (as with all Virtual Pool games) invisible instead of fully rendered. GameSpot's review concluded that "you can't find a pool sim that looks and plays as much like the real thing as Virtual Pool 3 does."

IGN were also positive about the game; scoring it an 8.5 out of 10, calling Virtual Pool 3 "really a great game", and saying the "great gameplay that will keep you entertained for a long time since", and "it's a whole lot of fun". However, IGN also said that Virtual Pool 3 "won't replace the real thing".

== Sequel ==
Virtual Pool 4, the sequel to the game announced on July 6, 2012, and was released on 15 August 2012 worldwide for Windows. The game features many graphical and feature updates from Virtual Pool 3. An online-only version of the game was released in 2015 that features online tournaments and rankings, similar to Virtual Pool 3.
