= 2014 World Team Championship =

The 2014 World Team Championship (short: WTC 2014) was a professional team pool tournament that took place from 27 July to 2 August 2014. The event was held in Beijing, China. It was the third edition of the World Team Championship which was sanctioned by the World Pool-Billiard Association.

The defending champion was the Chinese Taipei team who won the 2012 World Team Championship, but they lost in the quarter-finals to the Filipino team. China defeated the Philippines in the final 4–2.

== Teams ==
Below is the list of participating teams, along with the four to six team members.

Group	Nation	Player 1	Player 2	Player 3	Player 4	(Player 5)	(Player 6)
A	Philippines	Dennis Orcollo	Lee Van Corteza	Carlo Biado	Rubilien Amit		
A	Poland	Karol Skowerski	Tomasz Kapłan	Mateusz Śniegocki	Katazyna Weslowska		
A	United States	Oscar Dominguez	Hunter Lombardo	Corey Deuel	Jennifer Barretta		
A	Bulgaria	Stanimir Dimitrov	Radostin Dimov	Lyudmil Georgiev	Kristina Zlateva		
B	China 1	Li Hewen	Wu Jiaqing	Chu Bign Chia	Han Yu	Chen Siming	
B	Sweden	Andreas Gerwen	Marcus Chamat	Tomas Larsson	Caroline Roos		
B	Hong Kong	Kwok Chi Ho	Eric Lee	Lo Ho Sum	Robbie James Capito	Lee Tricia Gar Yun	
B	Croatia	Josip Šušnjara	Ivica Putnik	Marko Lišnić	Zrinka Antonijević		
B	Mongolia	L. Delgerdalai	D. Damdinijamts	A. Yeruult	A. Delgerkhuu	Z. Zoljargal	
C	United Kingdom	Daryl Peach	Karl Boyes	Chris Melling	Allison Fisher		
C	Germany	Thorsten Hohmann	Ralf Souquet	Sebastian Staab	Ina Kaplan		
C	Austria	Albin Ouschan	Tong He Yi	Jürgen Jenisy	Thomas Knittel	Jasmin Ouschan	Sandra Baumgartner
C	South Africa	Rajandran Nair	Charles Kuppusamy	Kumersen Reddy	Thilomi Govender		
D	China 2	Liu Haitao	Dang Jinhu	Wang Can	Fu Xiaofang	Liu Shasha	
D	Australia	Robby Foldvari	David Rothall	Michael Cassiola	Lyndall Hulley		
D	Vietnam	Trung Le Quang	Tuan Nguyen Anh	Quan Do Hoang	Le Doan Thi Ngoc		
D	Singapore	Chan Keng Kwang	Aloysius Yapp	Koh Seng Ann Aaron	Charlene Chai Zeet Huey	Toh Lian Han	Hoe Shu Wah
E	Chinese Taipei	Chang Jung-lin	Ko Pin-yi	Hsu Kai-lun	Fu Che-Wei	Chou Cheih Yu	
E	South Korea	Ryu Seung-woo	Jeong Young-hwa	Ha Min Ug	Kim Ga Young		
E	Russia	Konstantin Stepanov	Ruslan Chinakhov	Andrey Seroshtan	Ann Mazhirina		
E	New Zealand	Matthew Edwards	Philip Nickpera	Jonathan Pakieto	Molradee Yanan		
F	Japan	Naoyuki Ōi	Masaaki Tanaka	Hayato Hijikata	Chichiro Kawahara		
F	Indonesia	Bewi Simanjuntak Bewi	Rudy Susanto	Muhammad Fadly	Silvana		
F	India	Sumit Talwar	Sundeep Gulati	Lalrina Tenthlei	Suniti Damani		
F	Malaysia	Ibrahim Bin Amir	Tan Kah Thiam	Jason Ng Keat Siang	Suhana Dewi Sabtu	Klaudia Djahalie	

== Results ==
=== Group stage ===
==== Group A ====
Philippines	Bulgaria	5:1
Poland	USA	4:2
Philippines	USA	4:2
Bulgaria	Poland	0:6
USA	Bulgaria	5:1
Philippines	Poland	6:0

Table

Place	Team	Points	Playoff
1	Philippines	9	:
2	Poland	6	:
3	United States	3	:
4	Bulgaria	0	:

==== Group B ====
China 1	Mongolia	6:0
Sweden	Hong Kong	4:2
Sweden	Mongolia	5:1
Hong Kong	Croatia	2:4
China 1	Croatia	5:1
Mongolia	Hong Kong	2:4
China 1	Hong Kong	6:0
Croatia	Sweden	4:2
China 1	Sweden	5:1
Croatia	Mongolia	3:3

Table

Place	Team	Points	Playoff
1	China	12	:
2	Croatia	7	:
3	Sweden	6	:
4	Hong Kong	3	:
5	Mongolia	1	:

==== Group C ====
Great Britain	South Africa	6:0
Germany	Austria	4:2
Great Britain	Austria	3:3
South Africa	Germany	0:6
Austria	South Africa	6:0
Great Britain	Germany	4:2

Table

Place	Team	Points	Playoff
1	United Kingdom	7	:
2	Germany	6	:
3	Austria	4	:
4	South Africa	0	:

==== Group D ====
China 2	Singapur	5:1
Australia	Vietnam	2:4
China 2	Vietnam	5:1
Singapore	Australia	6:0
Vietnam	Singapore	4:2
China 2	Australia	6:0

Table

Place	Team	Points	Playoff
1	China 2	9	:
2	Vietnam	6	:
3	Singapore	3	:
4	Australia	0	:

==== Group E ====
Chinese Taipei	New Zealand	6:0
South Korea	Russia	1:5
Chinese Taipei	Russland	5:1
New Zealand	South Korea	2:4
Russia	New Zealand	5:1
Chinese Taipei	South Korea	5:1

Table

Place	Team	Points	Playoff
1	Chinese Taipei	9	:
2	Russia	6	:
3	South Korea	3	:
4	New Zealand	0	:

==== Group F ====
Japan	Malaysia	5:1
Indonesia	India	3:3
Japan	India	5:1
Malaysia	Indonesia	1:5
India	Malaysia	2:4
Japan	Indonesia	6:0

Table

Place	Team	Points	Playoff
1	Japan	9	:
2	Indonesia	4	:
3	Malaysia	3	:
4	India	1	:

=== Knockout round ===
First round
1	China 1	4
16	Singapore	1
8	Poland	4
9	Croatia	1
5	Philippines	4
12	Indonesia	0
4	Chinese Taipei	4
13	Austria	2
6	China 2	4
11	Sweden	0
3	United Kingdom	4
14	Vietnam	1
7	Germany	4
10	Russia	2
2	Japan	4
15	United States USA	1

Quarter-finals
China	4
Poland	1
Philippines	4
Chinese Taipei	2
China 2	4
United Kingdom	0
Germany	3 (5)
Japan	3 (7) (Note: Japan won the shootout 7-5.)

Semi-finals
China 1	0
Philippines	4
China 2	4
Japan	2

Final
Philippines	2
China 2	4
