= Tom Storm =

Swedish pool player (born 1965)

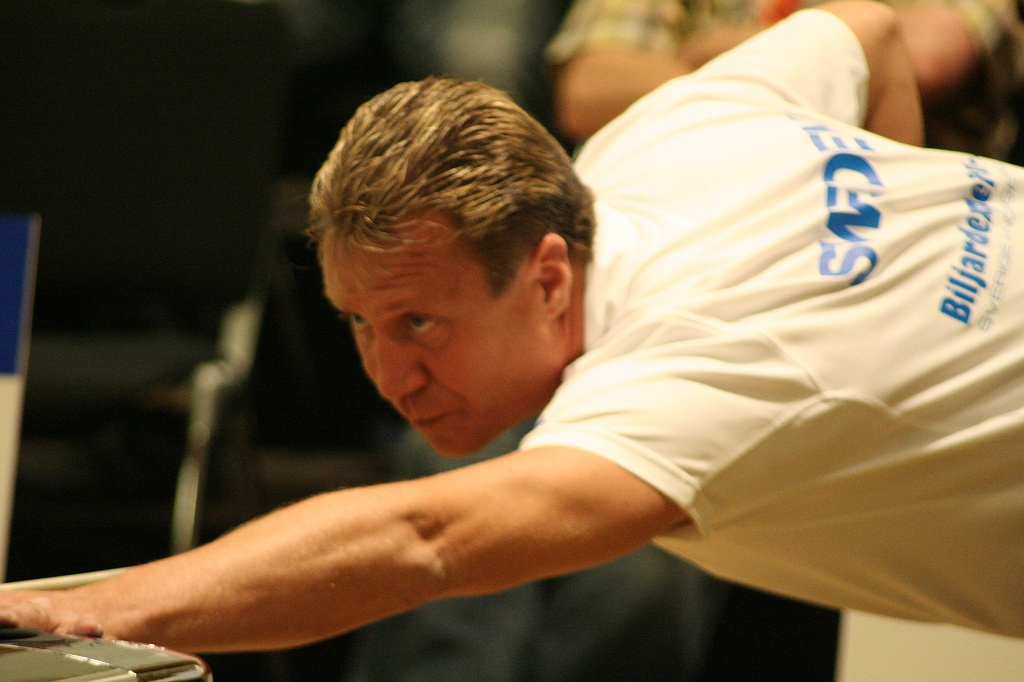

Personal information
- Nickname: "The Hurricane"
- Born: 16 March 1965 (age 61) Borlänge, Sweden

Pool career
- Country: Sweden
- Pool games: 9-ball, Straight pool
- Best finish: Runner-up 1996 WPA World Nine-ball Championship

Tom Storm (born 16 March 1965 in Borlänge, Sweden) is a former Swedish professional pool player. Storm was the runner-up at the 1996 WPA World Nine-ball Championship. Storm represented Europe at the Mosconi Cup twice, in 1994 and 1995.

Storm has won a total of 5 Euro Tour events, placing him 7th in the highest winners on tour. He won his first Euro Tour event in 1994, at the Danish Open.

== Titles ==
- 1987 European Pool Championship 9-Ball
- 1988 European Pool Championship 9-Ball
- 1990 European Pool Championship 8-Ball
- 1994 Euro Tour Danish Open
- 1995 Euro Tour French Open
- 1995 Mosconi Cup
- 1996 Euro Tour German Open
- 1999 European Pool Championship 14.1
- 2003 Euro Tour Belgian Open
- 2003 Euro Tour German Open
