= Virtual Pool 2 =

1997 video game

- Original PC release box art
- Developer: Celeris
- Publisher: VR Sports
- Platform: Windows
- Release: NA: November 20, 1997; EU: 1997
- Genre: Sports simulation – pool
- Modes: Single-player, multiplayer

Virtual Pool 2 (acronymed to VP2) is a 3D, first-person sports simulation video game developed by Celeris and released by VR Sports on behalf of Interplay Productions in 1997. It is the third release of the Virtual Pool franchise of computer simulations of pool games developed by Celeris. VP2 is the second main series title in the Virtual Pool series, and would later be released alongside Virtual Pool 1.

== Gameplay ==
Player attempts to pot the "3" Ball in the corner pocket, using left hand english and follow

Virtual Pool 2 is a simulation of several different modes of pool. Like its predecessor, Virtual Pool, the game is viewed in first-person 3D perspective, in contrast to most earlier pool games, which featured a fixed overhead view. As with all Virtual Pool games, Interplay offered a full refund for buyers of the game who did not see an improvement in their pool abilities within 45 days of purchase and returned the CD-ROM to the company.

In addition to the three pool game modes offered in Virtual Pool (nine ball, straight pool and eight ball), Virtual Pool 2 includes different modes of eight-ball pool (APA rules, English pub or American bar variations), as well as other variants, such as three-ball, 10-ball, one-pocket and bank pool. The game uses a higher frame rate and resolution of 16-bit graphics over the original. The game was released for Microsoft Windows 95, but was later patched to work on Windows 98.

Following on from Virtual Pool, Virtual Pool 2 expands the amount of AI opponents to over 100. Whilst also expanding the number of game modes on offer, the game also includes the ability to play, and create tournaments, all for online, single player, or multiplayer use.

Ronnie O'Sullivan and Steve Davis return from Virtual Snooker on the box art. Lou Butera makes a return in game to teach the player trick shots, whilst Mike Sigel is seen in game, showing off pool shots via in-game cutscenes.

== Development ==
The game was produced by Celeris, a former developer of surveillance and tracking software for the military.

== Reception ==
Reception

Aggregate score
Aggregator	Score
GameRankings	73%

Review scores
Publication	Score
CNET Gamecenter	8/10
Computer Games Strategy Plus	3.5/5
Computer Gaming World	4.5/5
GameSpot	7.8/10
GameStar	78%
Hyper	84%
Next Generation	5/5
PC Gamer (US)	90%

Virtual Pool 2 received generally similar reviews to that of Virtual Pool, but generally more positive than that of Virtual Snooker. GameSpot said that the game had "taken many strides in improving upon its earlier Virtual Pool", and that VR Sports had "worked magic". However, they also stated that Virtual Pool 2 "requires some getting used to." GamePro said, "With a great soundtrack, dazzling visuals, and intuitive control, no self-respecting shark should be without Virtual Pool 2." (Note: GamePro gave the game a perfect 5/5 for graphics, sound, control, and fun factor.) Next Generation called it "a simulation of rare quality [that] deserves all the success it can get."

Virtual Pool 2 was a finalist for the Academy of Interactive Arts & Sciences' inaugural "PC Sports Game of the Year" award, and was also nominated for the "Best Sports Game" award at the CNET Gamecenter Awards for 1997; both awards were ultimately given to FIFA: Road to World Cup 98.
