= 1998 Mosconi Cup =

- Dates: 17–20 December
- Venue: York Hall
- Location: Bethnal Green, London, England
- 9 – 13 United States wins the Mosconi Cup

The 1998 Acclaim Mosconi Cup, the fifth edition of the annual nine-ball pool competition between teams representing Europe and the United States, took place 17–20 December 1998 at the York Hall in Bethnal Green, London, England.

Team USA won the Mosconi Cup by defeating Team Europe 13–9.

== Teams ==
Team USA
Name	State of birth	Notes
Kim Davenport	Oklahoma
Johnny Archer	Georgia
Earl Strickland	North Carolina
Reed Pierce	Mississippi
Nick Varner	Kentucky
Jim Rempe	Pennsylvania

Team Europe
Name	Nationality	Notes
Ralf Souquet	Germany
Steve Knight	United Kingdom
Mika Immonen	Finland
Oliver Ortmann	Germany
Steve Davis	United Kingdom
Fabio Petroni	Italy

== Results ==
=== Thursday, 17 December ===
==== Session 1 ====
	Results
Doubles; Mika Immonen; Ralf Souquet	7–5	Doubles; Johnny Archer; Nick Varner
Doubles; Oliver Ortmann; Steve Knight	7–6	Doubles; Jim Rempe; Earl Strickland
Doubles; Fabio Petroni; Steve Davis	5–7	Doubles; Kim Davenport; Reed Pierce
2	Session	1
2	Overall	1

=== Friday, 18 December ===
==== Session 2 ====
	Results
Doubles; Mika Immonen; Ralf Souquet	7–3	Doubles; Jim Rempe; Earl Strickland
Doubles; Steve Davis; Fabio Petroni	3–7	Doubles; Nick Varner; Johnny Archer
Doubles; Oliver Ortmann; Steve Knight	7–5	Doubles; Kim Davenport; Reed Pierce
2	Session	1
4	Overall	2

==== Session 3 ====
	Results
Singles; Oliver Ortmann	3–7	Singles; Johnny Archer
Singles; Steve Knight	3–7	Singles; Earl Strickland
Singles; Mika Immonen	4–7	Singles; Reed Pierce
Singles; Ralf Souquet	7–1	Singles; Nick Varner
1	Session	3
5	Overall	5

=== Saturday, 19 December ===
==== Session 4 ====
	Results
Doubles; Steve Knight; Oliver Ortmann	6–7	Doubles; Earl Strickland; Kim Davenport
Doubles; Ralf Souquet; Mika Immonen	5–7	Doubles; Johnny Archer; Nick Varner
Doubles; Steve Davis; Fabio Petroni	7–2	Doubles; Reed Pierce; Jim Rempe
1	Session	2
6	Overall	7

==== Session 5 ====
	Results
Singles; Steve Davis	2–7	Singles; Kim Davenport
Singles; Fabio Petroni	5–7	Singles; Jim Rempe
Singles; Mika Immonen	4–7	Singles; Earl Strickland
0	Session	3
6	Overall	10

=== Sunday, 20 December ===
==== Session 6 ====
	Results
Singles; Ralf Souquet	7–5	Singles; Johnny Archer
Singles; Oliver Ortmann	4–7	Singles; Reed Pierce
1	Session	1
7	Overall	11

==== Session 7 ====
	Results
Singles; Steve Knight	7–6	Singles; Nick Varner
Singles; Steve Davis	7–6	Singles; Jim Rempe
Singles; Fabio Petroni	5–7	Singles; Kim Davenport
Singles; Ralf Souquet	4–7	Singles; Johnny Archer
2	Session	2
9	Overall	13
