= Virtual Pool Hall =

1999 video game

- Developer: Celeris
- Publisher: Interplay Entertainment
- Platform: Microsoft Windows
- Release: NA: December 29, 1999
- Genres: Sports simulation – snooker & pool
- Modes: Single-player, multiplayer

Virtual Pool Hall is a sports simulation video game developed Celeris and published by Interplay Entertainment as an entry in the Virtual Pool franchise, an improvement and sequel to Virtual Pool 2 and PC sequel to Virtual Pool 64. The game was initially released on PC in December 1999. Pool Hall is the first game in the Virtual Pool series to have playable Snooker in addition to the regular pool gamemodes.

== Gameplay ==
Virtual Pool Hall boasts 128 computer AI opponents to play against, with various different game modes. 8-ball and 9-ball pool returns, as well as the choice of 4 different tables to play on. The game also features new gameplay modes, including other table based games, such as billiards, and snooker, as well as other mini-games, such as golf, Honalulu and bowliards; which are all games based on billiards.

The game also offers instructional videos with professional player Mike Sigel, with the option to pause the video to play the shot being attempted by the professional.

== Reception ==
Reception

Aggregate score
| Aggregator | Score |
|---|---|
| GameRankings | 77.50% |

Review scores
| Publication | Score |
|---|---|
| GameSpot | 8.2/10 |
| IGN | 8.2/10 |

Critical Reception for Virtual Pool Hall was generally high, with review aggregator website Game Rankings scoring the game 77.50%. GameSpot scored the game at 8.2/10 saying that the graphical quality was very good, saying "the balls and table look top-notch", and the gameplay was "as fast and enjoyable as ever". However, the review also suggested that the multiplayer support was poor, as the game had no built in multiplayer mode, but simply 3rd party support for multiplayer.

IGN also gave the game an 8.2 out of 10, stating that the game has "startling precision" when it came to realism of the physics. They also cited the "impressive visuals" on display, and finished off saying "basically, Virtual Pool Hall has everything you've been looking for in a PC billiards simulation."
