= Valley (video game) =

2016 video game

- Developer: Blue Isle Studios
- Publisher: Blue Isle Studios
- Writer: Garett Marks
- Composers: Aakaash Rao; Selcuk Bor
- Engine: Unity
- Platforms: Microsoft Windows; OS X; Linux; PlayStation 4; Xbox One; Nintendo Switch
- Release: Microsoft Windows, OS X, Linux, PlayStation 4, Xbox One; August 24, 2016; Nintendo Switch; March 7, 2019
- Genre: Action-adventure
- Mode: Single-player

Valley is an action-adventure game developed and published by Blue Isle Studios. It was released on Microsoft Windows, PlayStation 4, and Xbox One on August 24, 2016. OS X and Linux were added with patch 1.02 on October 3, 2016. It was released on Nintendo Switch on March 7, 2019.

== Gameplay ==
Valley is a first person action-adventure single-player video game. The player explores a WWII-era, abandoned military base in a secluded valley nestled deep in the Rocky Mountains. Early on, the player discovers the L.E.A.F (Leap Effortlessly through Air Functionality) suit, a remnant of some experiments conducted during World War II. The suit gives superhuman abilities that must be used to explore the vast valley with forests, ruins and magical creatures. The player character is somehow linked to the valley, having the ability to take and give life, but not without consequence.

== Reception ==
Valley received "mixed or average" reviews, according to review aggregator Metacritic, calculating an average score of 72 out of 100 based on 15 reviews for the PlayStation 4 version, 68 out of 100 based on 11 reviews for the Xbox One version, and 63 out of 100 based on 3 reviews for the PC version. The game was criticized for technical issues, length, and pacing, but heavily praised for its exhilarating gameplay and interesting world. User reviews on Steam are "Very Positive", on Metacritic they vary between each platform (all of the user review averages are in the range between 7 and 8).

James Stephanie Sterling, reviewing the PS4 release, heavily praised Valley, saying that, "Despite a few missteps, Valley is an overall rush of an experience." and that "It boasts an amazing soundtrack, splendid backdrops, and inspiringly propulsive interactions, all of which convince me Valley deserves to be counted as a true sleeper hit of the year", giving it an 8.5/10. Gaming Age, also reviewing it on PlayStation 4, gave it a 10/10 saying that it will "stick with you for a long time".

Mat Paget of GameSpot gave the game a 7/10, saying that while "Valley feels like a good first act. Despite obstacles that tend to abruptly kill your momentum, running and bounding through wilderness remained exciting. The world's history is so intriguing that I left wanting to know more." he felt that he "didn't want the adventure to end, and like a jogger who's forced to slow down in the middle of a run, I was frustrated that Valley had to end so soon after it began." Alanah Pearce of IGN gave it a 5/10, saying that "Valley very rarely presents the challenge or consequence it really needs to be addictive."
