= 2012 World Team Championship =

World Pool Team Championship, held July 2012

The World Team Championship 2012 (WTC 2012) was played from 1 to 4 July 2012 in Beijing, China. It was the second edition of the World Team Championship which was sanctioned by the World Pool-Billiard Association, for pool teams.

The event was won the Chinese Taipei team by a 4–0 victory in the final against Japan. The defending champion Great Britain was eliminated in the semi-finals against the eventual champion.

== Format ==
Each participating team consisted of four to five players, including at least one female player. The games consisted of two sets in the disciplines eight-ball, nine-ball and ten-ball with the two 8-ball matches were played in men's singles. The woman played a 9-ball and a 10-ball match. The two 10-ball matches were played as a double, whilst 9-ball was played in singles.

=== Prize money ===
A total of $300,000 in prize money was distributed, the winning team received $80,000. Below are the prize money per team indicated.

Position	Amount
Winner	80.000 US-$
Finalist	40.000 US-$
Semi-finalists	20.000 US-$
Quarter-finalists	12.000 US-$
Last 16	7.500 US-$
Double elimination	4.000 US-$

== Participating teams ==
Teams were split into six groups of four, with the top two from each group progressing. Teams were made up of either four or five players. Teams representing each nation are shown below:

Group	Nation	Player 1	Player 2	Player 3	Player 4	(Player 5)
A	Estonia	Erki Erm	Joonas Saska	Mark Magi	Anna Grintosuk	
A	Indonesia	Ricky Yang	Irsal Nasution	Muhammad Zulfikiri	Amand Rahayu	
A	Croatia	Ivica Putnik	Božo Primić	Karlo Dalmatin	Zrinka Antonijević	
A	Philippines	Efren Reyes	Francisco Bustamante	Dennis Orcollo	Rubilen Amit	
B	China 1	Li Hewen	Fu Jianbo	Liu Haitao	Fu Xiaofang	Pan Xiao Ting
B	Finland	Petri Makkonen	Aki Heiskanen	Abbas al-Marayati	Marika Pokkijoki	
B	Canada	Jason Klatt	John Morra	Erik Hjorleifson	Brittany Bryant	
B	Malaysia	Ibrahim Bin Amir	Patrick Ooi	Moh Keen Hoo	Klaudia Djajalie	
C	Australia	David Rothall	Louis Condo	Robby Foldvari	Lyndall Hulley	
C	China 2	Dang Jinhu	Dai Yong	Han Haoxiang	Liu Shasha	Chen Siming
C	Hong Kong	Kenny Kwok	Lee Chenman	Andrew Kong	Ellen Cheung	Ruby Cheung
C	Singapore	Sharik Aslam Sayed	Toh Lian Han	Aloysius Yapp	Lum Wai Keong	Ann Koh Seng
D	Japan	Yukio Akakariyama	Tōru Kuribayashi	Naoyuki Ōi	Chihiro Kawahara	
D	Poland	Mateusz Śniegocki	Radosław Babica	Tomasz Kapłan	Oliwia Zalewska	
D	Sweden	Marcus Chamat	Tomas Larsson	Andreas Gerwen	Carline Roos	
D	Vietnam	Do The Kien	Nguyen Anh Tuan	Nguyen Manh Tung	Doan Thi Ngoc Le	
E	United Kingdom	Darren Appleton	Daryl Peach	Chris Melling	Mark Gray	Kelly Fisher
E	India	Alok Kumar	Sundeep Gulati	Sayed Habib	Neena Praveen	
E	South Africa	Dave van den Berg	Dino Nair	Nickie Erasmus	Nicola Rossouw	
E	South Korea	Lee Wansu	Ryu Seung-woo	Hwang Young	Kim Ga-young	
F	Chinese Taipei	Chang Jung-lin	Fu Che-wei	Ko Pin-yi	Chuo Chieh-yu	
F	Germany	Oliver Ortmann	Thorsten Hohmann	Ralf Souquet	Jasmin Michel	
F	Mongolia	L. Munkbold	L. Delgerdalai	T. Amarjargal	B. Uyanga	A. Batkhuu
F	Norway	Roger Rasmussen	Mats Schjetne	Matey Ullah	Ine Helvik	

== Tournament bracket ==
The results below are from the knockout stages onwards.

Last 16
Chinese Taipei	4
India	1
Sweden	9
Indonesia	7
United Kingdom	4
Australia	1
Poland	1
China	4
Philippines	4
Norway	0
Germany	2
Japan	4
South Korea	11
Canada	13
China	4
Finland	0

Quarter-final
Chinese Taipei	4
Sweden	0
United Kingdom	9
China	7
Philippines	8
Japan	10
Canada	2
China	4

Semi-final
Chinese Taipei	4
United Kingdom	0
Japan	9
China	7

Final
Chinese Taipei	4
Japan	0
