= Virtual Snooker =

1996 video game

- Developer: Celeris
- Publishers: Interplay Productions; Softkey (Windows)
- Platforms: MS-DOS, Windows
- Release: NA: July 17, 1996
- Genre: Sports
- Modes: Single-player, multiplayer

Virtual Snooker is a sports video game developed by Celeris and published by Interplay Productions as an entry in the Virtual Pool franchise, the second in the series. The game was released for MS-DOS in July 1996, the year after the original Virtual Pool. Both use the same game engine and many of the same digital assets. Whilst Virtual Pool has four types of pool to play, Virtual Snooker only simulates traditional snooker. It was later ported to Windows 95 and Windows 98 and distributed by SoftKey.

== Gameplay ==
Taking the break in a frame of Virtual Snooker

Similar to other releases in the Virtual Pool series, the game is controlled by keyboard and mouse, with shots being made by mouse movement. The game features first-person 3D graphics and allows the player to stand up away from the line of the shot, and move around the table to see different angles. The game boasts a higher frame rate than that of the original Virtual Pool. In each release of the game, there is the ability to play locally networked multiplayer games on an Ethernet LAN, and to do basic online multiplayer between two remote computers via analog modems.

The game features LAN capabilities, and the ability to connect two computers via modem for basic online multiplayer. As with other games in the series, Virtual Snooker was marketed with a guarantee that the simulator would improve the player's non-simulated game at a real table. The game's box indicates six-time World Snooker Champion Steve Davis in a starring role. The game offers 52 minutes of instructional videos with Davis, and the option to pause the video and attempt the shot being demonstrated by the game. This live-action material also includes the world's first televised maximum break in history, completed by Davis.

Ronnie O'Sullivan, another top-level professional player, acts as presenter in the game (both he and Davis feature in the cover art, superimposed on snooker balls). O'Sullivan would later work on World Snooker Championship 2007 and his own game, Ronnie O'Sullivan's Snooker.

== Reception ==
Reception

Aggregate score
Aggregator	Score
GameRankings	67%

Review scores
Publication	Score
GameSpot	7.2/10
Virtual Playground	90%
World Village (Gamer's Zone)	80%
PC Joker (German)	80%

Critical reception for Virtual Pool Hall was moderate, with review aggregator website Game Rankings scoring the game 67%. Stephen Pool of GameSpot scored the game at 7.2/10 saying "how much you enjoy Virtual Snooker depends mainly on how much interest you have in real snooker.". GameSpot cited the game for following on from Virtual Pool, and "you can expect the same excellence" in terms of gameplay. They also stated that the inclusion of Steve Davis in game was an "excellent job", that "show(ed) you the ideal way to play the game."

GameSpot were less impressed with the lack of depth in gameplay modes; "where Virtual Snooker disappoints is in its lack of variety." Where Virtual Pool had other types of Pool to play, Virtual Snooker only had Snooker. Other paper reviews, such as Germany's PC Joker, cited the game for its playability, as well as its looks, but also found the game did not have much replayability.
