= Virtual Pool (video game) =

1995 video game

- Developer: Celeris
- Publisher: Interplay Productions
- Platforms: MS-DOS, Mac, PlayStation, Windows
- Release: MS-DOS, Windows; 1995; Mac: NA: March 1997; PlayStation: EU: May 1997; NA: November 17, 1997
- Genre: Sports
- Modes: Single-player, multiplayer

Virtual Pool (retroactively called Virtual Pool 1 after the release of sequels) is a 3D, first-person sports simulation video game released by Interplay Productions in 1995. It is the first of the Virtual Pool franchise of computer simulations of pool games developed by Celeris.

== Overview ==
Virtual Pool is an accurate simulation of straight pool, eight-ball, nine-ball, and rotation pool. The game is viewed in first-person 3D perspective, in contrast to most earlier pool games which featured a fixed overhead view. The game's publishers, Interplay, offered a full refund for buyers of the game who did not see an improvement in their pool abilities within 45 days of purchase and returned the CD-ROM to the company.

Virtual Pool has revolutionary features that allow players to actually 'walk' around the table to check out their next shot, take a closer look, back away, look left or right and then line-up the shot like they would in a real game with a real table. This title also allows players to take an overhead view from above, something unavailable in a real pool game. Taking game tips from World Champion pool player "Machine Gun" Lou Butera is guaranteed to improve the player's game. Butera will teach players over 30 famous trick shots the player can practice on their computer screen and then implement on a real table.

== Gameplay ==
A game of 9-ball pool from Virtual Pool

As with later games in the Virtual Pool series, the game is played with keyboard, and mouse, with shots being played by moving the mouse forwards, to simulate moving the cue. The control scheme devised for the game would be the same one that would be continued through the Virtual Pool series.

The game features four different pool modes, with eight-ball, 9-ball, rotation and straight pool. There are also a choice of 9 different AI opponents to face off against, as well as local competitive multiplayer, or online via a modem. The player has the ability to alter the amount of pace, side and angle of playing shots, as well as accurately mimic the effect of raising the butt of the cue to play a swerve shot.

Also featured is an original soundtrack, music ranging from rock to country, with regular sounds effects for striking the balls, and hitting rails.

== Release ==
Pre-release versions of the 1995 PC version of Virtual Pool were leaked. The authorized production version of the game a different code named than that of the leaked copies. According to IPC the stolen version was "being offered for sale at some swap meets, computer fairs and small retail shops" and "contain a defective software program which will not operate properly."

The game was released for MS-DOS and Windows in 1995, with plans to port the game to the Saturn, PlayStation, and Mac. The game was successfully released worldwide for PlayStation and Mac in 1997, after the release of Virtual Snooker. However, the planned Saturn release was eventually cancelled, for unknown reasons. Before cancellation, the release was scheduled for May 1997, around the time of release of the PlayStation release in Europe. Some time after the release of the sequel Virtual Pool 2, both games were re-packaged as a two-in-one CD-ROM jewel case edition (i.e., a bargain bin version without a box), called the "Virtual Pool 1 / Virtual Pool 2 Bundle" Before the release of Virtual Pool 2, the game sold over 2 million copies.

== Reception ==
=== PC version ===
Reception

Aggregate score
Aggregator	Score	
Aggregator	PC	PS
GameRankings	75%	74%

Review scores
Publication	Score	
Publication	PC	PS
Electronic Gaming Monthly	N/A	7.25/10
GameSpot	7.5/10	7.4/10
IGN	N/A	7/10
Next Generation	5/5	3/5
Entertainment Weekly	100%	N/A
MacUser	4.5/5	N/A

PC Gamer US named Virtual Pool the "Best Sports Game" of 1995. The editors wrote, "For weeks after its release, the sounds of pool balls clacking together and dropping into the pockets was about all we heard in the PC Gamer office, and Virtual Pool is still a big hit around here." Entertainment Weekly gave the game a perfect score, stating "with its first-person perspective and true-to-life physics, Virtual Pool is one of the rare simulations that may actually improve your real game." GameSpot said the interface was "elegant and responsive", and that the player can "almost feel the contact with the ball."

Next Generation reviewed the PC version of the game, and stated that "Interplay has dressed Virtual Pool up with some multimedia chrome - videos on the history and theory of the game - but it could just as easily have left it out The core of Virtual Pool, the game itself, is as close to perfect as a PC game can get."

Virtual Pool was named the 57th best computer game ever by PC Gamer UK in 1997. Virtual Pool was also voted the Game of the year by Games magazine in 1995. The game was also awarded best simulation of 1995 from the Academy of Interactive Arts & Sciences, best Sports Game of 1995 from PC Gamer magazine and Best VR Game of 1995 from Computer Player magazine.

=== PlayStation version ===
The PlayStation version was not as enthusiastically received. Most critics found that the graphics, being largely identical to those of the PC version, were outdated by the time the game was released on PlayStation. The heavy slowdown was also criticized, and some critics recommended players buy the PlayStation Mouse for the game, saying that the control is unacceptably imprecise with the standard gamepad. However, critics still applauded the game's accurate physics and found the instructional videos still helpful in improving one's skills. Josh Smith of GameSpot concluded that these elements, and the wide range of possible viewpoints, are enough to make the game enjoyable. GamePro's review also found the game solid overall, and appealing to players of all skill levels. A reviewer for Next Generation described it as "slow and ugly", and recommended only due to the lack of better competition. The two sports reviewers of Electronic Gaming Monthly made similar remarks, with Kraig Kujawa summarizing, "Virtual Pool delivers, but it could be better." IGN liked the gameplay, and concluded that "Aside from the bland, flat shaded graphics, Virtual Pool is an awesome pool sim."

=== Sales ===
According to Interplay, global sales of Virtual Pool surpassed 250,000 copies by June 1998.
