= Vincent Facquet =

French professional pool and trickshot player

Personal information
- Born: 20 December 1968 (age 57)

Pool career
- Country: France

Vincent Facquet (born December 20, 1968) is a professional pool and trickshot player from France. Facquet represented France alongside Stephan Cohen at the World Cup of Pool, twice reaching the second round. He won the last edition of the World Snooker Trickshot Championship in 2006. He won the 2005 World Trickshot Masters Championship, a trickshot competition held during the World Pool Masters. He was runner up at the 1996 World Pool Masters, losing in the final to Ralf Souquet.
