= Vocabulon =

1998 video game

- Developers: Megableu, Index+
- Platforms: Windows, Mac
- Release: 1998
- Genre: Educational

Vocabulon is a French language educational video game, produced by Megableu and Index+ in 1998. It was released for both Microsoft Windows based PCs and Apple Macintosh computers.

The aim of the game is to save the world of words (Vocabulon) from the diabolical professor Charabia, who has built a machine which devours letters. The player has to bring a bomb into his den, where the player finds each letter, which composes the code, on islands of Vocabulon.
