= Vigil: Blood Bitterness =

2006 video game

Victi: Blood Bitterness
- Developer: Freegamer
- Publisher: Freegamer
- Platform: Windows
- Release: 2006

Victi: Blood Bitterness (or Vigil: Blood Bitterness) is a point-and-click adventure video game developed by French studio Freegamer and published by Microapplication. It was released in 2006 on Windows.

== Development and release ==
Originally conceived as the first entry in the French episodic adventure game series L'Aventure Originale, Vigil: Blood Bitterness was created with the Torque Game Engine. Its art style was inspired by Frank Miller and Philippe Druillet. The game features a guttural soundtrack and a constructed language with English and Latin elements.

Vigil: Blood Bitterness was initially released in February 2006. Microapplication began sales of physical copies in June. In June 2007 Steam released the game for online distribution, under the title Vigil - Episode 1: Blood Bitterness. On June 1, GarageGames announced sales on their site.

== Reception ==
Vigil: Blood Bitterness received mixed to negative reviews.

The most positive reviews praised its graphics and visuals. GamesRadar liked the "gorgeous" visuals and backgrounds. Just Adventure praised its atmospheric elements. 4 Players deemed it "unusual". Gry Online thought the graphics were surreal and economical. PC World noted the "interesting" art style while Meristration noted its comic book aesthetics. Destructoid compared the art to Sin City. Multiplayer felt the developers were courageous and original. Jeuzactu appreciated the game's low price.

Adventure Gamers felt the game would inspire feelings of hopelessness and frustration, while Jeuxvideo wrote that the game plays like a demo. Gamekult felt the game left a lot to be desired. Onet criticised the game's difficulty, deeming it near impossible to complete without the aid of a walkthrough. While originally thinking the project was promising, upon release Factor News wrote that the game failed on all levels.
