= Virtual Safari =

1997 video game

- Developer(s): Anglia Multimedia
- Publisher(s): Fujitsu Interactive
- Platform(s): Windows 95
- Release: March 31, 1997
- Genre(s): Edutainment
- Mode(s): Single-player

Virtual Safari is a 1997 video game developed by Anglia Multimedia and published by Fujitsu Interactive. The game is set in a first-person 3D environment around Africa on a Safari trip to take photographs of animals. The photographs could be submitted to Anglia Multimedia and the best ones would be displayed on their website.

== Gameplay ==
The player navigates around Three Trees Lodge, acquiring items and solving puzzles. Much of the information required comes from the Colonel. Before the player can pick up items, the rucksack must be obtained. The player's main objective is to get the camera equipment out of the front room chest and take photographs of animals in the wild. Travelling from the lodge to other areas requires the use of the Colonel's car. The player has access to six books with facts about animals and a minigame.

== Development ==
Anglia Multimedia made use of Superscape technology to get the virtual reality effect. The game also compatible with Stereo Glasses and other VR utilities.

== Reception ==
=== Critical reception ===
Reception

Award
Publication	Award
Parents' Choice	Silver Honor

=== Promotion ===
Anglia Multimedia showcased the game to the London Zoo.
