= World Team Championship (pool) =

Cue sports national teams tournament

WPA World Team Championship
- Sport: Pool
- Founded: 2010
- Founder: World Pool-Billiard Association
- Most recent champion: Philippines (2026)
- Related competitions: World Cup of Pool
- Website: wpapool.com

The WPA World Team Championship is a pool tournament for national teams sanctioned by the World Pool Association (WPA). The event was first held biannually from 2010 to 2014, and again from 2022 to 2026.

== History ==
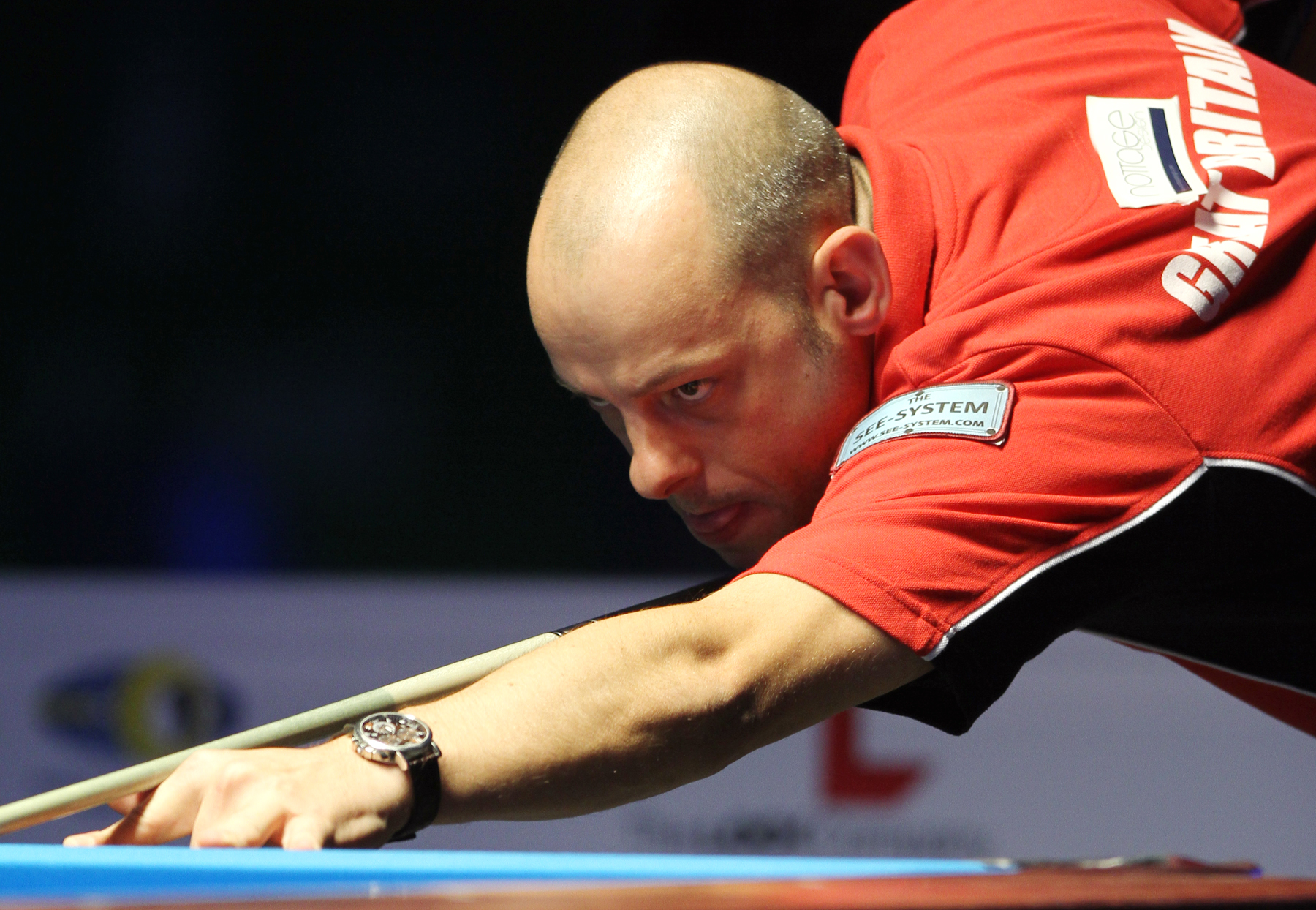
Darren Appleton of the 2010 championship team

The first edition of the World Team Championship was contested in 2010 in Hanover. The British team of Darren Appleton, Daryl Peach, Imran Majid, Karl Boyes and Mark Gray won the tournament in the final against the Philippines.

The next two editions of the championship were contested in Beijing. The second edition in 2012 was won by the Chinese Taipei team of Chang Jung-lin, Fu Che-wei, Ko Pin-yi and Chou Chieh-yu defeating Japan in the final.

The third event in 2014 was won by the Chinese team of Liu Haitao, Wang Can, Fu Xiaofang, Liu Shasha and Dang Jinhu defeating the Philippines in the final.

The Philippines’ Rubilen Amit, Carlo Biado and Johann Chua defeated the British team of Kelly Fisher, Jayson Shaw and Darren Appleton 3-0 to win the 2022 event. The Filipino trio emerged victorious, eight years after finishing as runners-up to China in 2014.

== Format ==
In 2010, 42 teams participated in the championship, competing first in a double-elimination tournament until 16 teams were left in the tournament where they played a single-elimination tournament. Starting in 2012, 24 teams took part each year. Teams were divided into groups of four in a round robin, with the winners and runners-up of each group (as well as best placed third placed teams) progressing in the final group of 16, which then played in single-elimination format.

Teams consist of four to six players, including at least one woman. A match consists of two games each in the disciplines of eight-ball, nine-ball and ten-ball. The games of eight-ball and nine-ball are played singly, while the ten-ball games are played as Scotch-doubles. One nine-ball and ten-ball game must be played by a woman. For each game won, the corresponding team gets one point. In the group stage, a team receives three points for a win and one point for a draw. When there is a tie in the knockout round, the winner is determined by a shootout.

== Results ==
Year	Location	Winner	Score	Runner-up	Semi-finalists	
2010	(Germany) Hannover	United Kingdom 1	4:1	Philippines	Greece	Russia
2012	(China) Beijing	Chinese Taipei	4:0	Japan	United Kingdom	China
2014	(China) Beijing	China 2	4:2	Philippines	Japan	China
2022	(Austria) Klagenfurt	Philippines	3:0	Great Britain	Germany	Chinese Taipei
2023	(Puerto Rico) San Juan	Germany	3:2	Chinese Taipei	Austria	Portugal
2026	(United States) Las Vegas	Philippines	3:2	Poland	United States	Austria
