= Honolulu (pool) =

Pocket billiards game

Honolulu, also known as banks, kisses, and combinations or indirect, is a pocket billiards game. Players must pocket all shots in an indirect fashion to reach a set number of points. The game shares some similarities with other cue sports, played on tables and with balls used for pool, but differs with foul points being awarded for regular direct shots.

== Rules ==
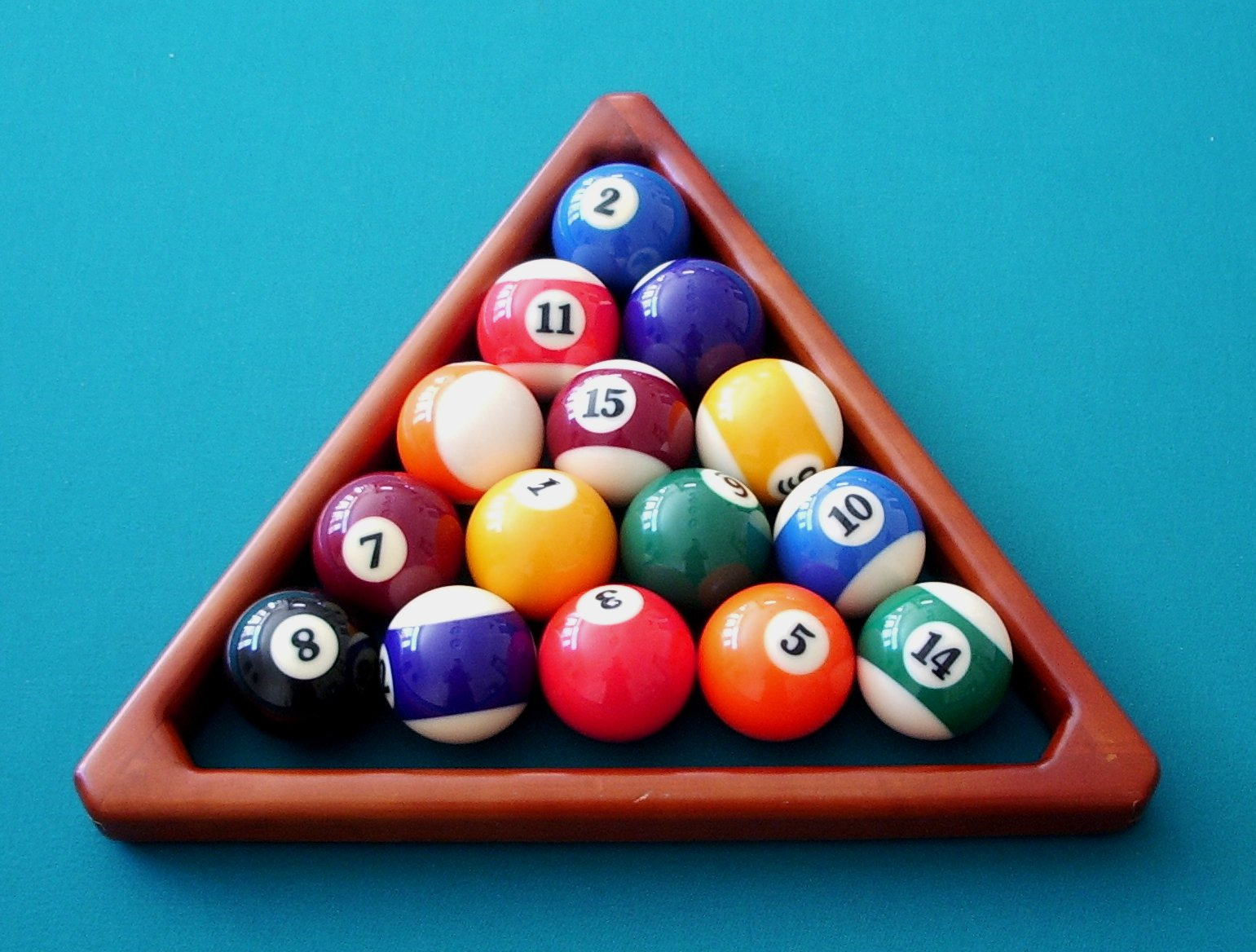
The game is played with fifteen pool balls

Honolulu is generally played between two competitors or teams. The game is played on a traditional pool table, with fifteen pool balls. The object of the game is to score eight points by pocketing balls in a legitimate manner. What is and what is not considered legitimate is where the game diverges from more common pool game objectives. In Honolulu, pocketing a ball directly is a foul shot. Points can, however, be scored by completing banks, combinations, caroms or kick shots. In addition, players may not play short-rail kicks, or kick from cushions into adjacent pockets.

Every shot must be called. Before a shot, players have to designate both the ball and target pocket. Players may elect to call more than one ball on a single shot, but all balls called must be correctly potted, or there is no score. At the start of a game, the balls are racked on a pool table's foot spot, with a set of fifteen balls, placed in random order, and a cue ball. On the opening break shot, the player must either call a ball out of the rack and an intended pocket, or cause two object balls and the cue ball to strike a rail. The failure to do so is a foul. Unlike other games of pool, there is no concession of a game after conceding three successive fouls.

As in the similar game of one-pocket, the penalty for all fouls in Honolulu is the loss of a point, meaning one previously pocketed ball must be returned to the table's surface. Such spotted balls are placed on the table as close as possible to the foot spot, and as close as possible to any balls already occupying that space in the direction of the foot rail. If a player has no balls to spot, the penalty is owed, and at the end of the player's next scoring inning, the requisite number of balls owed are replaced.

According to the Billiard Congress of America, the governing body for billiards in the United States, Honolulu presents players with "an unending kaleidoscope of strategic and shot-making challenges."
