= Bowlliards =

Pool game

Bowlliards or bowliards is a pool game often used as a training drill. The game borrows aspects of ten-pin bowling, hence the name. The game is divided into ten frames where a player gets a maximum of two innings to pocket ten balls.

== Gameplay ==
At the start of each "frame" (round of play, in bowling terms), ten object balls are racked in a triangle with the front ball placed at the foot spot. The cue ball is placed behind the head string and the first player breaks. After the break the player gets ball in hand and tries to pocket as many balls as possible until missing. This is considered the first inning of the frame. If there are still balls left on the table after the first inning, the player gets a second inning to attempt to finish clearing the table. Clearing all the balls on the first inning is called a strike, clearing any remaining balls on the second inning is called a spare. For details on scoring see the scoring section for ten-pin bowling.
