= Dallas West =

American pool player

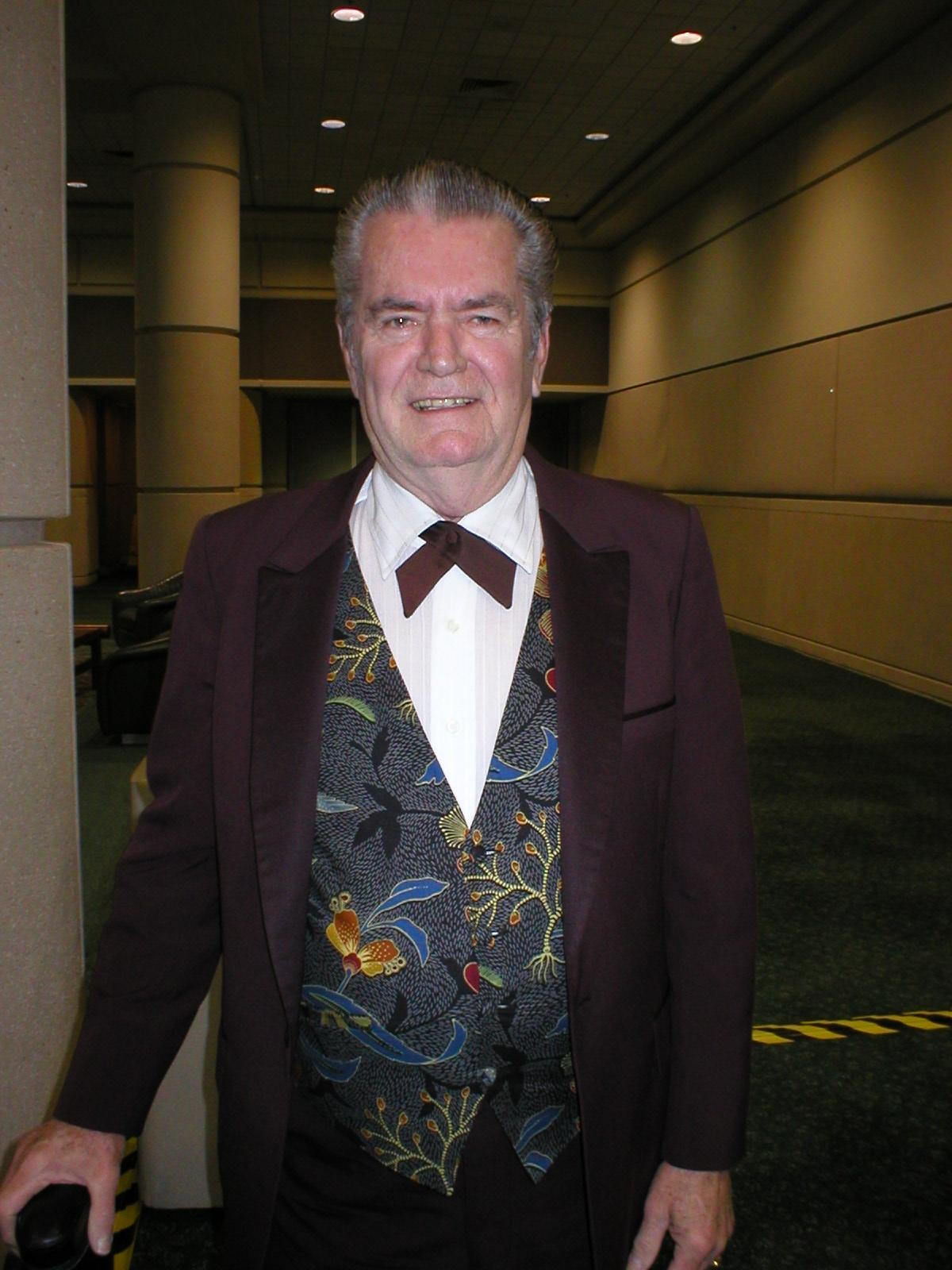
- West at the 2005 IPT King of the Hill Shootout

Personal information
- Born: 1941 (age 84–85) Rockford, Illinois, U.S.

Pool career
- Country: United States
- Best finish: Runner-up 1995 WPA World Nine-ball Championship

Dallas West (born 1941, Rockford, Illinois) is an American pool player and was inducted into the Billiard Congress of America Hall of Fame in 1996.

West is known for having a strong competitive spirit and is respected by his peers as being a gentleman player. He has the distinction of being the only player to compete in every one of the BCA U.S. Open Straight Pool Championship up until 2000.

In May 1997, Dallas West made a ball on the break without scratching on each of his 11 breaks en route to an 11–1 victory over John Duclos.

At age 13, he had run 97 balls at straight pool. West was the US Open straight pool champion in 1975 and 1983.

In December 2005, Dallas West competed in the International Pool Tour's King of the Hill Shootout, a 42-player invitational round-robin eight-ball tournament, in Orlando, Florida. Each one of the 14 BCA Hall of Famers who attended were paid $30,000, win or lose, to compete in this event as a tribute to their accomplishments in pocket billiards.

== Professional career ==
- 1968 Midwest Open 14.1 Championship
- 1968 Motor City Pocket Straight Pool Classic
- 1971 Midwest Open 14.1 Championship
- 1972 Milwaukee 14.1 Championship
- 1973 Illinois 3-Cushion Tournament
- 1973 Midwest Open 14.1 Championship
- 1974 Cue-Nique 9-Ball Open
- 1975 BCA U.S. Open Straight Pool Championship
- 1978 Virginia Beach 14.1 Tournament
- 1978 A.B.A 3-Cushion Tournament
- 1979 Gentleman Jim's 9-Ball Tournament
- 1979 Joe Farhat's 9-Ball Open
- 1981 Wisconsin 9-Ball Open
- 1983 BCA U.S. Open Straight Pool Championship
- 1984 Lite Beer Series of Tavern Pool Pro 9-Ball
- 1984 Chicago 9-Ball Open
- 1994 Mosconi Cup
- 1996 Billiard Congress of America Hall of Fame
