= Three-ball =

Folk game of pool

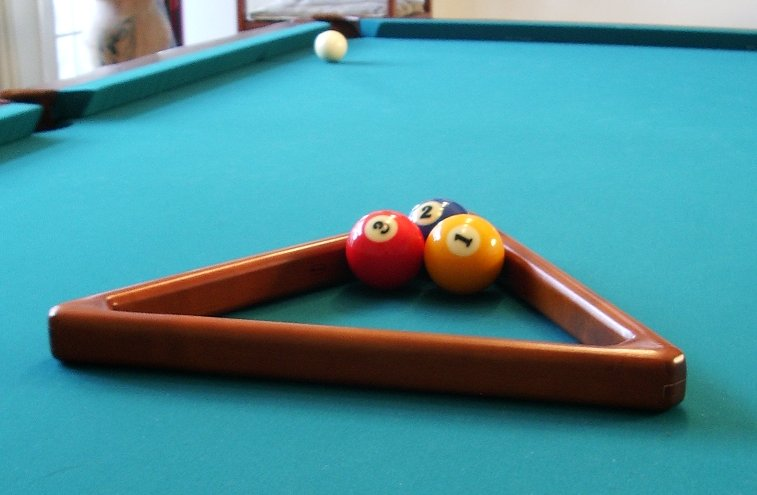
Racking a game of three-ball with the standard fifteen-ball triangle rack.

Three-ball (or "3-ball", colloquially) is a folk game of pool played with any three standard pool object balls and cue ball. The game is frequently gambled upon. The goal is to pocket (pot) the three object balls in as few shots as possible. The game involves a somewhat more significant amount of luck than either nine-ball or eight-ball, because of the disproportionate value of pocketing balls on the break shot and increased difficulty of doing so.

== Play ==
There are no widespread official or standardized rules for three-ball, though local tournaments promulgate rulesets that have some sway over area player populations even outside the context of the tournaments. Below are listed the most common, widely accepted rules.

The game is played on any pool table. A single round usually consists of three or five games per player, with each player's individual game scores added to calculate their final score for the round, and a match may consist of several multi-game rounds, back-to-back or spread out over a period of time. In a gambling context, three-ball is typically played in multiple games (each played out until someone wins the betting pool, then after new antes are placed, play begins again), sometimes for many hours, with players able to enter and leave as suits their finances and risk-aversion.

=== Object ===
The object of the game is to sink all of the object balls in as few strokes as possible, with points being added to the player's score for each stroke and for specific fouls. Unlike in eight-ball and nine-ball which are alternating turn-based games, the player at turn remains at turn until all object balls are pocketed, or the player concedes or reaches the maximum point limit (see below). All strokes count as one point each, whether they pocketed no balls, one ball, or more than one ball. Fouls incur additional penalty points (see below).

There is a predetermined cut-off score of a certain number of points, after which the player must turn the table over to the next player (or conclude the game/round if the player was the last in the lineup).

=== Winning ===
Once a player's inning is over, the next player starts over with a fresh rack. After all players have finished, the player with the lowest score is declared to be the winner. In a tournament context, the winner of the event may be the player with the lowest total score over many rounds of play (strict scoring), or the highest number of won rounds (loose scoring). In case of a tie, a playoff round is played between the tied players (and repeated if another tie results).

=== One Tie, All Tie Format ===
This format is a popular version of Three Ball when gambling. In this format, an ante amount per player is established for the game, with each game consisting of only one round. At the end of the first round, if there is a tie for the lowest score between two or more players, ALL the players advance to a tie-breaking round. Hence, the term "ONE TIE, ALL TIE". All players then put an additional ante into the pot with each successive tie-breaking round. This format is a great way to keep all players, including those players of lesser skill, engaged with every shot. This format also leads to large pots, that grow progressively every time a new tie-breaking round begins.

=== The rack ===
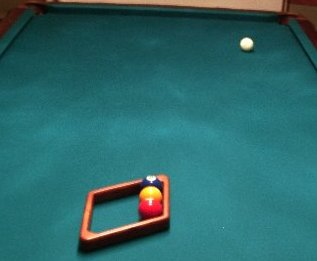
A three-ball straight rack, using the side of the nine-ball diamond rack to align the balls with the head and foot spots.

Three object balls (conventionally the 1, 2 and 3 balls) are racked either in a triangle with the apex ball on the foot spot, or in a straight line, again with the lead ball on the foot spot, and the other balls behind it, lined up toward the center of the foot rail. No particular arrangement is necessary, as there is no specific order in which the balls must be pocketed, nor do any of them have specific point values. As in other games, the player at turn may demand a re-rack if not satisfied with the correct formation or position of the racked balls. Racking may be done with a standard wooden or plastic rack, or (in informal play) by hand.

=== The break ===
The players' turn order is decided at random at the beginning of the game or match, as in other several-player pool games. The cue ball is placed anywhere behind the head string ("in the kitchen") and a hard break is typically performed. The break is the first stroke of a player's game, and thus counts toward their score. Any balls pocketed on the break are considered to be legally pocketed and the player now only has to sink the remaining balls.

=== Fouls ===
Fouls consist of pocketing the cue ball or knocking the cue ball off the table (a scratch); a double hit on the cue ball with the cue stick; push shots; and moving a ball with a hand, the butt of the cue, or other illegal motion. Every foul of any kind costs the player an additional one-point penalty. A shot in which the player pocketed one or more object balls but also fouled still incurs a penalty.

Shots after a scratch must be taken from on or behind the head string and must go forward across/from the head string rather than be taken ball-in-hand anywhere on the table.

Object balls knocked off the table are spotted on the foot spot, and do not count as fouls.

Kisses, caroms, kicks, banks, combinations and non-scoop-under jump shots are legal. The game is not typically played with called shots.

=== Teams ===
The game can be played as a team game in two ways. First, players can be divided into even teams, with each player on each team shooting a full game per round, and the scores within each team being combined to yield the final score. Secondly, the game can be played in scotch doubles format, with players alternating shots, and each team only playing a single game per round, as if there were only two players.

== History ==
The modern game of three-ball appears to have originated from an earlier game of the same name, played as a rotation game with the 1 through 3 balls, and the same rules as nine-ball, but with the 3 taking the place of the 9. Its evolution over the last few decades can be traced back to 1984, in the Chicago suburbs, where J. C. Lee came up with three-ball as a quick and fun way to practice pool. He soon realized that several players, with varied billiard skill, could be involved in one turn-based game. The "one tie, all tie" rule, with re-ante betting rounds became an instant catalyst for the popularity of the game.

== As practice for other games ==
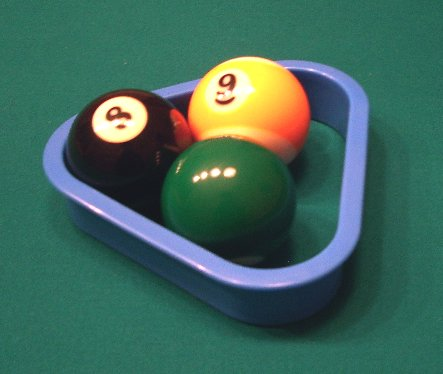
Using the 8, 9 and 6 balls for practice, in a special three-ball rack. (Side view.)

Some players use repetitive playing of solo three-ball as a form of practice. This form of practice is often used as a drill to hone position play with the final balls of a rack in eight-ball and nine-ball. An eight-ball practice variant is to use two solids or two stripes and the 8 ball, and shoot the 8 ball last, while practice for nine-ball will often use the 7, 8, and 9 balls shot in order.
