= Lou Butera =

American pool player (1937–2015)

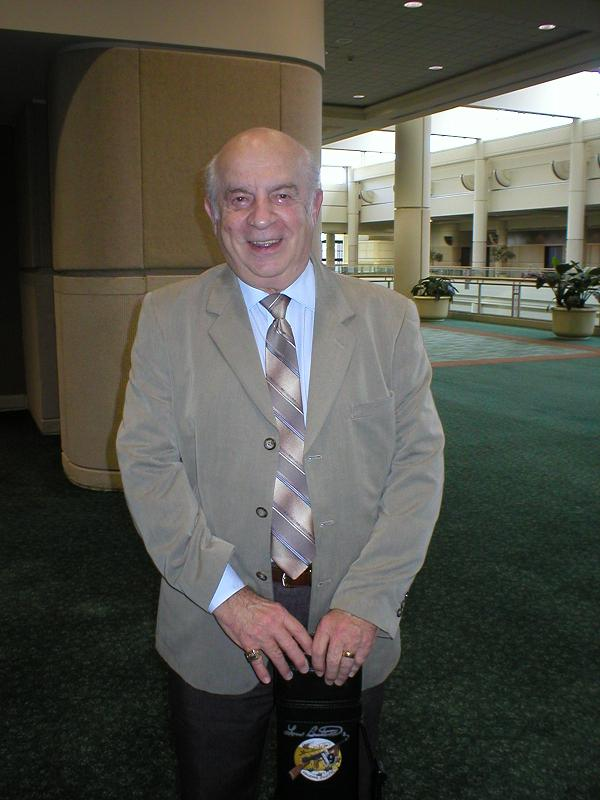
- Butera in 2005

Personal information
- Nickname: "Machine Gun Lou"
- Born: 15 May 1937 Pittston, Pennsylvania, U.S.
- Died: 25 June 2015 (aged 78) Los Angeles

Pool career
- Country: United States

Tournament wins
- World Champion: Straight Pool (1973)

Lou Butera (May 15, 1937 – June 25, 2015) was an American professional pool player (then retired and operated a pool hall) and an inductee into the Billiard Congress of America's Hall of Fame in 1986.

His nickname, "Machine Gun Lou", derives from his stunning the crowd and fellow competitors by running 150-and-out in straight pool in under 25 minutes against his opponents.

He gained exposure to the masses in 1981 and 1982 when he appeared in network trick shot competitions on CBS and ABC.

== Early life ==
When Lou was seven years old, his mother died. His father, who owned a billiard room, had Lou come directly to the business after school each day. Lou would do his homework then play pool until he and his father went home. His early idol was Irving Crane, a pool player from Binghamton, NY.

== Career ==
Lou earned his famous nickname, from setting the world record for fastest run out, in an exhibition against Luther Lassiter he ran 150 balls in straight pool in just 19 minutes. Throughout his career, Butera won many tournaments. He was runner-up to Irving Crane in the 1972 World Championship in Los Angeles. In 1973, he won his first World Championship. He also won the Pennsylvania State Championship.

In 1974, Butera won the All Japan Championship title, and also triumphed over Richie Florence to win the Bud Lundahl's Midwest Open, a straight pool tournament he won by a score of 150–68 in the title match. In 1991, Butera served as coach of the World Billiard Federation World Team, whose members included Nick Varner, Mike Sigel and Ray Martin. In a profile that appeared in the May/June, 1995 issue of Snap Magazine, he was referred to as "...the man who may be the fastest pool player the game has ever known."

Lou Butera was one of the 43 invited pool players who competed in the International Pool Tour's King of the Hill Shootout in Orlando, Florida, December 2005. Digitized videos of Butera demonstrating trick shots were included with the PC pool simulator Virtual Pool.

== Death ==
He died from Parkinson's disease on June 26, 2015.

== Filmography ==
As an accomplished pool player, Butera has produced various instructional videos for students of pool about the fundamentals of the game.

Lou Butera appeared in several films as an actor and technical advisor. He had a cameo appearance, as himself, in the pool hustling comedy film The Baltimore Bullet and as a pool player in Police Academy 6: City Under Siege. Butera had a cameo appearance as pool player in, and was the pool technical advisor for, the 1984 film Racing with the Moon, starring Sean Penn.

He was also featured on the 1995 Virtual Pool CD Rom video game. In 1986 he was inducted into the Billiard Congress of America Hall of Fame.

== Movies ==
Year	Title	Role
1980	The Baltimore Bullet	Technical Adviser
1984	Racing with the Moon	A Pool Player
1989	Police Academy 6: City Under Siege	A Pool Player

== Titles ==
- 1964 Pennsylvania Straight Pool Tournament
- 1965 Pennsylvania Straight Pool Tournament
- 1966 Pennsylvania Straight Pool Tournament
- 1967 Midwest Open Straight Pool Tournament
- 1969 Street City Open Straight Pool Tournament
- 1969 Pittsburgh Straight Pool Tournament
- 1972 California Straight Pool Tournament
- 1973 BCA World Straight Pool Championship
- 1974 U.S. Classic 14.1 Championship
- 1974 All Japan Championship 9-Ball
- 1975 Midwest Open 14.1 Championship
- 1986 Billiard Congress of America Hall of Fame
- 1994 Mosconi Cup
