= Rotation (pool) =

Type of cue sport

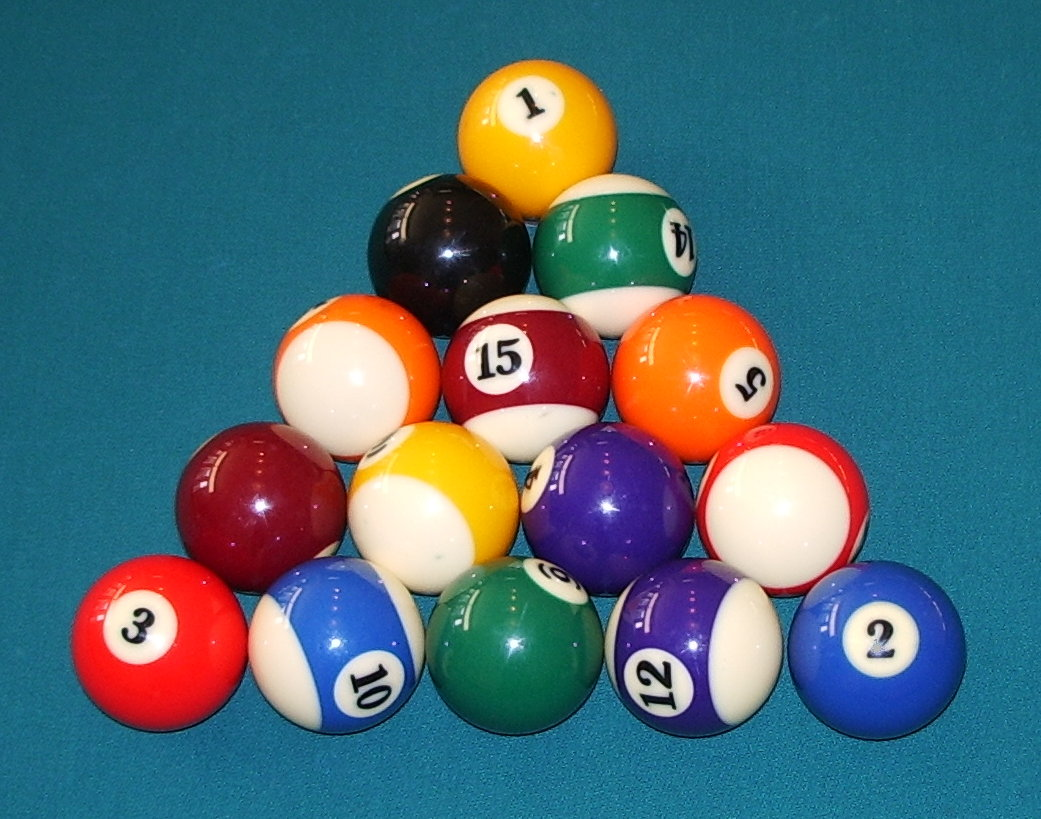
The appropriate rack for rotation from the racker's point of view; the 1 ball is at the apex of the rack and is on the foot spot, the 2 is in the corner to the racker's right, the 3 ball is in the left corner, and the 15 is in the center, with all other balls placed randomly, and all balls touching.

Rotation, sometimes called rotation pool, 15-ball rotation, or 61, is a pool game, played with a pocketed billiards table, cue ball, and triangular rack of fifteen billiard balls, in which the lowest-numbered object ball on the table must be always struck by the cue ball first, to attempt to pocket numbered balls for their nominal point values. That is, the 3-ball is worth three (3) points, the 8-ball is worth eight (8) points, etc. As the total points possible is 1 + 2 + 3 … + 14 + 15 = 120, a simple majority of 61 points wins the frame.

Some spectator attractions of rotation include performing unconventional or difficult shots to reach the correct ball, and quite often making risky attempts to score a higher number of points. This can be achieved by performing advanced shots such as combination shots, bank shots, and swerves. These in addition to the fortitude to mentally, with knowledge, act out each planned play; complex problem solving displayed when physically performing each cue ball play are the players' main attractions.

== Rules ==
=== Object ===
The object of the game is to acquire the most points, by pocketing higher-scoring balls than the opponent(s). A frame (individual game) is won when a player or team reaches a number of points (usually 61) that makes it impossible for the opponent(s) to win. A match may consist of multiple frames (e.g. a race to 10), or in multiple rounds of multiple frames (e.g. three rounds of best 2-out-of-three), as in other types of pool.

=== Scoring ===
Points are scored by pocketing the object balls on the table; the number of points awarded is equal to the number printed on the ball pocketed. For example, pocketing the 4 ball scores the player 4 points. In a two-player (or two-team) game, the frame is over when a player or team has at least 61 points, one more than half the number of available points. Games tied at 60 points can occur, in which case the player who last legally pocketed a ball is credited with a bonus point and declared the winner. More than two players or teams can play, with the winning score being whichever number will mathematically eliminate other players from outscoring the leader.

=== Set up ===
At the start of each frame, the balls are racked in a triangle as in eight-ball and other games using fifteen object balls, but in particular with the 1 ball at the front (apex) of the rack, on the foot spot, the 2 ball on the right rear corner (from the vantage of the racker) and the 3 ball at the left rear corner (as in kelly pool), and the 15 ball (the one with the highest value) in the center; all other balls are placed randomly, and every ball must be touching. In informal British play, it is common to push the rack forward further so that the 15 ball, still in the center of the rack, is resting on the foot spot. (See illustration at top of article.)

=== Game play ===
The primary rule of the game is that the lowest numbered object ball on the table at any time is the "ball-on" and must be struck first (including on the break shot – a side break is a foul), regardless of the player's intentions of which ball to actually pocket. Players may use the lowest numbered ball to pocket other (e.g. higher value) balls. Consequently, this not being a call-shot game, points are also counted if a ball is unintentionally, but legally pocketed (a "fluke" or "slop shot"). A player's turn at the table continues until a shot fails to legally pocket a ball, a foul is committed, or the frame concludes. Illegally pocketed balls are spotted.

=== Safeties ===
Safety play is rather strictly limited in rotation. If a player legally pockets a ball, that player must shoot again. Unlike in many games, there is no provision for a called, intentional safety play that pockets a ball. Safeties that consist of simply using the cue ball to drive the ball-on to the closest cushion, without contacting another object ball in the course of the shot, are limited to only two such shots per player per frame. Other safeties are unlimited, provided that the lowest numbered ball is struck first and either at least two object balls move in the course of the shot, or the ball-on is driven to a cushion that is not the closest to it.

=== Fouls ===
If a foul is committed (other than a foul break or cue ball foul, as detailed below), the incoming player may either take the next shot or require the opponent to do so, with all balls as they lie in either case. If the exiting opponent's foul was scratching the cue ball into a pocket or off the table, the incoming player's shot is necessarily ball-in-hand, and must be taken from behind the head string (in baulk), though the incoming player may optionally require the fouling opponent to shoot again instead, with ball-in-hand behind the head string. Shots taken from behind the head string must cause the cue ball to cross it. However, if the ball-on is behind the head string, the player with ball in hand (including a fouling player who has been forced to take the shot by the opponent) may optionally have that ball spotted on the foot spot before shooting. There is no point penalty for fouls. Three consecutive fouls (i.e. on three consecutive turns at the table) by the same player is a loss of frame.

Fouls include:

- Failure to hit the lowest-numbered object ball first (or at all)
- Failure to make an open break on the break shot (incoming player may either accept the object balls as they lie and take cue ball in-hand behind the head string and shoot from there, or demand a re-rack and shoot a new break shot)
- Scratching the cue ball into a pocket or off the table (incoming player has ball-in-hand behind the head string, but may force the fouling opponent to shoot)
- Failure to either legally pocket an object ball, or drive any ball to a cushion
- Knocking an object ball off the table (it is spotted, but balls legally pocketed on the shot are not)
- A third or subsequent one ball safety to the closest cushion (see above)

=== Team play ===
Two-player doubles (or larger) teams compete by alternating teams and alternating players within each team. For example, if teams consist of players 1 and 2 versus players 3 and 4, and player 1 breaks, turns alternate in the pattern 1 (breaking), 3, 2, 4, 1, 3, 2, 4, etc. I.e., the ending of a player's turn at the table finishes that team's turn. As in individual competition, a player's turn at the table does not end until a foul is committed or the player fails to legally pocket an object ball (or the frame ends).

Three consecutive fouls by a team player disqualifies that player for the remainder of the frame (i.e., if player 3 were disqualified in the above example, then subsequent play order would be 4, 1, 2, 4, 1, 2, etc.) Balls that were legally pocketed by the disqualified player are not spotted.

Informally, team play can also be conducted in scotch doubles format. However, the disqualification rule does not apply, and three consecutive fouls by the team are a loss of frame (otherwise, the team with the hypothetically disqualified player would have an advantage, in not having to coordinate between two players).

== Variations ==
=== Short Rack Rotation ===
Simple rotation is the most basic rotation game, being directly derived from basic pyramid pool. The object of simple rotation is to pocket the most balls while still shooting at them in order. Simple rotation being a shorter version of 15 ball rotation. Short rotation games such as 6,7,9 and 10 ball; these games are meant to be run out without missing. Advanced short rack rotation games usually consist of one inning. The player's inning starts with a break shot and continues until the lowest numeric ball was not played into a pocket.

=== Nine-ball ===
The major competitive game nine-ball and its variants (six-ball, seven-ball, and ten-ball) are rotation games, but with a smaller set of balls and without the point-based scoring. In these games, only the namesake number of balls are used. The lowest numbered ball must be contacted with the cue-ball prior to contacting any other ball on the table. Once all the object balls have been played into a pocket, another game may start. Other times victory can happen when the player pockets the highest numbered ball in the rack, as in 9 ball rotation. Even if it is pocketed before all other balls and when the winner pockets no other balls, but the highest numbered ball.

=== Strict Rotation ===
In strict rotation, the balls must be pocketed sequentially, and not necessarily the first object ball contacted on the table. In 15 ball rotation, if the lowest ball on the table is struck, but a higher ball ends up being pocketed then that higher ball must be spotted back on the table after the shot; this is not a foul, but merely ends the shooter's turn as if it were a miss. If the lowest-numbered ball is hit first and is pocketed, but another ball also is pocketed, that other ball is spotted immediately, and the shooter's turn continues.

=== American Rotation ===
Invented by Joe Tucker to address some of the flaws inherent in traditional rotation games, American Rotation aims to appeal to a wider variety of players, including those of varying skill levels. Instead of playing to a set number of racks, a match is played to a set number of points, usually 100, over multiple racks. Balls 1-10 are each worth one point, and balls 11-15 are worth two points, amounting to a total of twenty points per rack.

Unique to American Rotation, aside from the opening break, every break shot gives the breaking player the cue ball in hand after the break, irrespective of whether or not a ball is made on the break. Tucker implemented this rule to eliminate the luck of pocketing a ball on the break. Additionally, to even out the match by preventing one player from continually breaking and running rack after rack, Tucker implemented a rule that the breaks alternate between racks, irrespective of which player pocketed the last ball.

== In the Philippines ==
In the Philippines, rotation pool is popular, especially among advanced players, but eight-ball, nine-ball and, increasingly, ten-ball, are widely played.
