= 1993 Women's World Snooker Championship =

Trusthouse Forte Women's World Snooker Championship
Tournament information
- Venue: Imperial Hotel
- City: Blackpool
- Country: United Kingdom
- Format: Single elimination
- Total prize fund: £40,000
- Winner's share: £10,000
- Highest break: 81 (Allison Fisher)

Final
- Champion: (England) Allison Fisher
- Runner-up: (England) Stacey Hillyard
- Score: 9–3

The 1993 Women's World Snooker Championship was a women's snooker tournament played in the United Kingdom in 1993. Defending champion Allison Fisher beat Stacey Hillyard 9–3 in the final to win the title.

== Tournament summary ==
The competition was promoted by Barry Hearn's Matchroom organisation and sponsored by Trusthouse Forte, with a total prize fund of £40,000. Fisher was the defending champion, having won the 1991 Women's World Snooker Championship, as the Women's World Championship was not held in 1992.

The Qualifying stages were held in Surrey and the final stages at the Imperial Hotel, Blackpool. There was television coverage of the event some days after the final, on Eurosport and London Weekend Television, the latter starting at 3:30 am.

The winner, Allison Fisher received £10,000 in prize money, and Stacey Hillyard received £5,000 as runner-up. The losing semi-finalists received £2,500 each, and the losing quarter-finalists £1,250 each. Fisher compiled the highest break of the tournament, an 81 in her semi-final against Ann-Marie Farren.

== Main draw ==
Source: Snooker Scene

Last 32; Best-of-7 frames
(England) Allison Fisher	4
(England) H. Audus	0
(England) L. Gordon	4
(England) K. Miners	2
(Wales) Sharon Dickson	4
(England) C. Jolly	1
(Scotland) Lynette Horsburgh	4
(England) T. Warren	0
(England) Ann-Marie Farren	4
(Republic of Ireland) J. Kelly	3
(England) Lisa Quick	4
(Scotland) V. Dalgleish	1
(England) Kelly Fisher	4
(England) Caroline Walch	3
(England) Tessa Davidson	4
(England) Sue Thompson	1
(Northern Ireland) Karen Corr	4
(England) J. Dowen	1
(England) June Banks	0
(Republic of Ireland) J. McGregor	4
(England) Sarah Smith	4
(England) H. Tredinnick	0
(England) Kim Shaw	4
(Republic of Ireland) C. Gallagher	1
(England) Mandy Fisher	4
(Canada) Maureen Seto	0
(England) Georgina Aplin	4
(England) N. Binden	1
(England) J. Gillespie	4
(England) D. Reynolds	1
(Belgium) Cathy Dehaene	0
(England) Stacey Hillyard	4

Last 16; Best-of-9 frames
(England) Allison Fisher	5
(England) L. Gordon	0
(Wales) Sharon Dickson	5
(Scotland) Lynette Horsburgh	2
(England) Ann-Marie Farren	5
(England) Lisa Quick	3
(England) Kelly Fisher	1
(England) Tessa Davidson	5
(Northern Ireland) Karen Corr	5
(Republic of Ireland) J. McGregor	1
(Northern Ireland) Sarah Smith	5
(England) Kim Shaw	0
(England) Mandy Fisher	3
(England) Georgina Aplin	5
(England) J. Gillespie	1
(England) Stacey Hillyard	5

Quarter-finals; Best-of-11 frames
(England) Allison Fisher	6
(Wales) Sharon Dickson	1
(England) Ann-Marie Farren	6
(England) Tessa Davidson	4
(Northern Ireland) Karen Corr	6
(England) Sarah Smith	2
(England) Georgina Aplin	0
(England) Stacey Hillyard	6

Semi-finals; Best-of-13 frames
(England) Allison Fisher	7
(England) Ann-Marie Farren	3
(Northern Ireland) Karen Corr	2
(England) Stacey Hillyard	7

Final; Best-of-17 frames
(England) Allison Fisher	9
(England) Stacey Hillyard	3
