= 1988 Women's World Snooker Championship =

Women's snooker event, held October 1988

Tournament information
- Dates: October 1988
- Venue: Pontins
- City: Brixham
- Country: England
- Organisation: World Ladies Billiards and Snooker Association
- Format: Single elimination
- Total prize fund: £10,000

Final
- Champion: Allison Fisher (ENG)
- Runner-up: Ann-Marie Farren (ENG)
- Score: 6–1

The 1988 Women's World Snooker Championship was a women's snooker tournament that took place in October 1988. It was the 1988 edition of the World Women's Snooker Championship, first held in 1976. Holiday Club Pontins provided prize money totalling £10,000 and the event was held at their resort in Brixham.

The tournament was won by Allison Fisher, who lost only one frame during the event and defeated Ann-Marie Farren 6–1 in the final. This was Fisher's third world snooker title, and she would go on to win a total of seven championships before focusing her efforts on pool in the United States from 1995.

== Main draw ==
Last 16; Best of 7 frames
Ann-Marie Farren (ENG)	4
Tessa Davidson (ENG)	3
Karen Corr (NIR)	4
Margaret O'Driscoll (IRL)	3
Lisa Gordon (ENG)	4
Jean Bedford (ENG)	0
Mandy Fisher (ENG)	4
Michelle Brown (ENG)	0
Stacey Hillyard (ENG)	4
Allyson Ratcliffe (ENG)	1
Lynette Horsburgh (SCO)	4
Kim Shaw (ENG)	3
Caroline Walch (ENG)	1
Lisbeth Jones (DEN)	4
Allison Fisher (ENG)	4
Roberta Abbott (ENG)	0

Quarter-finals; Best of 7 frames
Ann-Marie Farren (ENG)	4
Karen Corr (NIR)	0
Lisa Gordon (ENG)	2
Mandy Fisher (ENG)	4
Stacey Hillyard (ENG)	4
Lynette Horsburgh (SCO)	3
Lisbeth Jones (DEN)	0
Allison Fisher (ENG)	4

Semi-finals; Best of 9 frames
Ann-Marie Farren (ENG)	5
Mandy Fisher (ENG)	4
Stacey Hillyard (ENG)	0
Allison Fisher (ENG)	5

Final; Best of 11 frames
Ann-Marie Farren (ENG)	1
Allison Fisher (ENG)	6
