= 1990 Women's World Snooker Championship =

Trusthouse Forte Women's World Snooker Championship
Tournament information
- Venue: Waldorf Hotel
- City: London
- Country: England
- Total prize fund: £30,000
- Winner's share: £10,000
- Highest break: (England) Allison Fisher (97)

Final
- Champion: (Northern Ireland) Karen Corr
- Runner-up: (England) Stacey Hillyard
- Score: 7–4

The 1990 Women's World Snooker Championship was a women's snooker tournament. Sixty-six players entered the event, with the matches leading up to the semi-final being played at the Matchroom Club in Romford, England from 25 October and 4 November. The semi-finals and final were played at the Waldorf Hotel in London from 9–11 November, and received nine hours of television coverage on the European satellite channel Screensport. The competition was promoted by Barry Hearn's Matchroom organisation and sponsored by Trusthouse Forte and had a total prize fund of £30,000. Karen Corr, who had her 21st birthday on the day of her semi-final match, won in the final 7–4 against Stacey Hillyard. Following this tournament, losing finalist Hillyard replaced Allison Fisher as the top-ranked women's snooker player.

== Main draw ==
Last 16; Best of 9 frames
(England) Allison Fisher	5
(Canada) Maryann McConnell	0
(England) Kim Shaw	5
(Scotland) Lynette Horsburgh	3
(England) Georgina Aplin	5
(England) Lisa Gordon	2
(Northern Ireland) Karen Corr	5
(England) Maria Tart	2
(Wales) Sharon Dick	5
(England) Ann-Marie Farren	4
(Republic of Ireland) Margaret O'Driscoll	5
(England) Mandy Fisher	4
(England) Tessa Davidson	5
(England) Caroline Walch	2
(England) Stacey Hillyard	5
(England) June Banks	0

Quarter-finals; Best of 9 frames
(England) Allison Fisher	5
(England) Kim Shaw	1
(England) Georgina Aplin	2
(Northern Ireland) Karen Corr	5
(Wales) Sharon Dick	5
(Republic of Ireland) Margaret O'Driscoll	0
(England) Tessa Davidson	2
(England) Stacey Hillyard	5

Semi-finals; Best of 9 frames
10 November 1990
(England) Allison Fisher	2
(Northern Ireland) Karen Corr	5
10 November 1990
(Wales) Sharon Dick	4
(England) Stacey Hillyard	5

Final; Best of 13 frames
11 November 1990
(Northern Ireland) Karen Corr	7
(England) Stacey Hillyard	4
