= 1991 World Masters =

1991 Snooker tournament in Birmingham, England

World Masters
Tournament information
- Venue: National Exhibition Centre
- Location: Birmingham
- Country: England
- Established: 1991
- Organisation(s): Matchroom Sport
- Format: Non-Ranking event
- Final year: 1991

The World Masters, known for sponsorship reasons as the Mita/Sky World Masters, was a snooker tournament held between 13 and 26 January 1991. Conceived by promoter Barry Hearn, the tournament had a similar format to the Grand Slam events in tennis, with men's singles, men's doubles, women's singles, women's doubles, mixed doubles and a junior competition. As in tennis, players had to win a match by two clear frames. If a match was tied going into a final frame, an additional two frames would be played. If the players were still level, there would be a tie break deciding frame with just one red and all the colours.

There was controversy when Alex Higgins was invited to participate, despite being banned from snooker for the whole of the 1990/1991 season for punching an official at the 1990 World Championship, as the World Masters was not a WPBSA-run event. A number of players, among them reigning world champion Stephen Hendry, were unhappy with Higgins' inclusion and threatened to boycott the event if he appeared in it. Higgins voluntarily withdrew, and Hendry took his place in the tournament.

Staged at the National Exhibition Centre in Birmingham, it carried a record amount of prize money of £1,000,000; the winner of the men's singles won £200,000, more than the world champion would receive that year. During the tournament James Wattana made the ninth official maximum break against Paul Dawkins. However, the break was not filmed due to it being on one of the outside tables. Meanwhile, a 13-year-old Quinten Hann became the youngest player to make a televised century break. The tournament was subsequently unable to find sponsorship, and was not staged again.

The tournament was televised by the original incarnation of Eurosport. Coverage was presented by Dickie Davies, who had presented snooker on ITV until 1989. Matthew Lorenzo was the 'roving reporter'. The commentary team was Peter Brackley, Mike Watterson, Jim Wych, Paul Wade, Willie Jameson and Phil Yates. Alternative commentary was available in other languages across continental Europe, including from long-time commentator Rolf Kalb in Germany.

== Winners ==
Event	Winner(s)	Runner(s)-up	Final score
Men's Singles	(England) Jimmy White	(Malta) Tony Drago	10–6
Women's Singles	(Northern Ireland) Karen Corr	(England) Stacey Hillyard	6–2
Men's Doubles	(England) Mike Hallett (Scotland) Stephen Hendry	(Canada) Brady Gollan (Canada) Jim Wych	8–5
Women's Doubles	(England) Allison Fisher (England) Stacey Hillyard	(Northern Ireland) Karen Corr (England) Ann-Marie Farren	5–2
Mixed Doubles	(England) Steve Davis (England) Allison Fisher	(England) Jimmy White (England) Caroline Walch	6–3
Juniors (under-16s)	(Scotland) John Higgins	(Wales) Mark Williams	6–1

== Main draw (men's singles) ==
Last 64; Best of 11 had to win by two frames, 13th frame was sudden death
(Scotland) Stephen Hendry	6
(Thailand) Udon Khaimuk	0
(Thailand) James Wattana	6
(Netherlands) Rene Dikstra	0
(England) Joe Johnson	6
(Isle of Man) Mike Colquitt	4
(Canada) Alain Robidoux	6
(Northern Ireland) Kieran McAlinden	2
(South Africa) Peter Francisco	6
(England) David Taylor	4
(England) Nigel Bond	6
(England) Steve James	4
(Wales) Tony Chappel	6
(Canada) Bob Chaperon	2
(Northern Ireland) Jason Prince	6
(England) Dean Reynolds	2
(England) Jonathan Birch	6
(Brunei) Sim Siak Chong	0
(Republic of Ireland) Ken Doherty	6
(Wales) Doug Mountjoy	1
(England) Stefan Mazrocis	6
(England) Dave Harold	3
(England) Steve Longworth	6
(United States) Jim Rempe	0
(England) Neal Foulds	6
(Italy) Claudio Ravagnani	0
(Canada) Brady Gollan	6
(Wales) Steve Newbury	4
(England) Jimmy White	6
(England) Mark Johnston-Allen	3
(England) Danny Fowler	6
(Canada) Kirk Stevens	4
(England) Steve Davis	6
(England) Les Dodd	3
(Scotland) Euan Henderson	6
(Northern Ireland) Joe Swail	3
(Wales) Paul Davies	6
(Canada) Cliff Thorburn	2
(England) Tony Meo	6
(Egypt) Mohammed el Kamah	0
(Wales) Darren Morgan	6
(Republic of Ireland) Eugene Hughes	4
(Northern Ireland) Dennis Taylor	6
(England) Dave Finbow	3
(South Africa) Silvino Francisco	6
(Republic of Ireland) Stephen O'Connor	2
(England) Mike Hallett	6
(Finland) Jyri Virtanen	1
(England) Nick Dyson	7
(New Zealand) Warren King	5
(Wales) Terry Griffiths	6
(England) Jason Whittaker	2
(England) Willie Thorne	7
(Wales) Mark Bennett	6
(Wales) Wayne Jones	6
(Malta) Paul Mifsud	2
(Germany) Mike Henson	7
(India) BVS Murthy	6
(England) Gary Wilkinson	6
(Scotland) Alan McManus	2
(Malta) Tony Drago	6
(England) Tony Jones	3
(England) John Parrott	6
(Cyprus) George Loizides	0

Last 32; Best of 11 had to win by two frames, 13th frame was sudden death
(Scotland) Stephen Hendry	4
(Thailand) James Wattana	6
(England) Joe Johnson	7
(Canada) Alain Robidoux	5
(South Africa) Peter Francisco	6
(England) Nigel Bond	3
(Wales) Tony Chappel	6
(Northern Ireland) Jason Prince	3
(England) Jonathan Birch	7
(Republic of Ireland) Ken Doherty	5
(England) Stefan Mazrocis	2
(England) Steve Longworth	6
(England) Neal Foulds	4
(Canada) Brady Gollan	6
(England) Jimmy White	6
(England) Danny Fowler	2
(England) Steve Davis	6
(Scotland) Euan Henderson	3
(Wales) Paul Davies	2
(England) Tony Meo	6
(Wales) Darren Morgan	6
(Northern Ireland) Dennis Taylor	4
(South Africa) Silvino Francisco	2
(England) Mike Hallett	6
(England) Nick Dyson	3
(Wales) Terry Griffiths	6
(England) Willie Thorne	6
(Wales) Wayne Jones	3
(Germany) Mike Henson	3
(England) Gary Wilkinson	6
(Malta) Tony Drago	6
(England) John Parrott	2

Last 16; Best of 13 had to win by two frames, 15th frame was sudden death
(Thailand) James Wattana	7
(England) Joe Johnson	4
(South Africa) Peter Francisco	7
(Wales) Tony Chappel	4
(England) Jonathan Birch	4
(England) Steve Longworth	7
(Canada) Brady Gollan	0
(England) Jimmy White	7
(England) Steve Davis	7
(England) Tony Meo	5
(Wales) Darren Morgan	8
(England) Mike Hallett	7
(Wales) Terry Griffiths	8
(England) Willie Thorne	7
(England) Gary Wilkinson	5
(Malta) Tony Drago	7

Quarter-finals; Best of 15 had to win by two frames, 17th frame was sudden death
(Thailand) James Wattana	8
(South Africa) Peter Francisco	2
(England) Steve Longworth	6
(England) Jimmy White	8
(England) Steve Davis	5
(Wales) Darren Morgan	8
(Wales) Terry Griffiths	8
(Malta) Tony Drago	9

Semi-finals; Best of 17 had to win by two frames, 19th frame was sudden death
(Thailand) James Wattana	8
(England) Jimmy White	10
(Wales) Darren Morgan	7
(Malta) Tony Drago	9

Final; Best of 19 frames
(England) Jimmy White	10
(Malta) Tony Drago	6

== Main draw (women's singles) ==
Sources: Rothmans Snooker Yearbook 1991–92, Snooker Scene

First Round
(England) Stacey Hillyard	3
(Canada) Sheri Richardson	0
(England) June Banks	4
(Australia) Fran Lovis	2
(England) Kim Shaw	4
(Germany) Renate Newesil	0
(Scotland) Lynette Horsburgh	4
(Canada) Natalie Stelmach	3
(England) Caroline Walch	4
(Scotland) Elaine Roehr	2
(England) Georgina Aplin	3
(United States) Bonnie Hoffman	0
(England) Maria Tart	3
(New Zealand) Lorraine Field	0
(England) Allison Fisher	3
(Finland) Sanna Walle	0
(England) Ann-Marie Farren	3
(Republic of Ireland) Julie Kelly	0
(England) Lisa Gordon	4
(England) Lisa Quick	2
(England) Mandy Fisher	w.o.
(France) Valerie Hess	scr.
(Wales) Sharon Dick	3
(Canada) Maryann McConnell	0
(Republic of Ireland) Margaret Campion	3
(Belgium) Christine Leclercq	0
(England) Tessa Davidson	3
(Luxembourg) Sue Mikkewsen	0
(England) Sarah Smith	3
(Belgium) Anja Vandenbussche	0
(Northern Ireland) Karen Corr	3
(England) Debbie Reynolds	0

Second Round
(England) Stacey Hillyard	3
(England) June Banks	0
(England) Kim Shaw	0
(Scotland) Lynette Horsburgh	3
(England) Caroline Walch	0
(England) Georgina Aplin	3
(England) Maria Tart	1
(England) Allison Fisher	3
(England) Ann-Marie Farren	3
(England) Lisa Gordon	0
(England) Mandy Fisher	2
(Wales) Sharon Dick	4
(Republic of Ireland) Margaret Campion	1
(England) Tessa Davidson	3
(England) Sarah Smith	0
(Northern Ireland) Karen Corr	3

Quarter-finals
(England) Stacey Hillyard	5
(Scotland) Lynette Horsburgh	4
(England) Georgina Aplin	1
(England) Allison Fisher	4
(England) Ann-Marie Farren	4
(Wales) Sharon Dick	0
(England) Tessa Davidson	2
(Northern Ireland) Karen Corr	4

Semi-finals
(England) Stacey Hillyard	5
(England) Allison Fisher	2
(England) Ann-Marie Farren	3
(Northern Ireland) Karen Corr	5

Final
(England) Stacey Hillyard	2
(Northern Ireland) Karen Corr	6

=== Prize Money (Women's Singles) ===
Prize money was awarded as follows:

- Winner (Karen Corr) £15,000
- Runner-up (Stacey Hillyard) £5,000
- Losing semi-finalists £3,000
- Losing quarter-finalists £1,500
- Second round losers £1,000
- First round losers £500
- Highest break (Ann-Marie Farren, 62) £2,000
