= 1989 Women's World Snooker Championship =

Women's snooker event, held October 1989

Tournament information
- Dates: 14–21 October 1989
- Venue: Pontins
- City: Brixham
- Country: England
- Organisation: World Ladies Billiards and Snooker Association
- Format: Single elimination
- Winner's share: £3,500

Final
- Champion: Allison Fisher (ENG)
- Runner-up: Ann-Marie Farren (ENG)
- Score: 6–5

The 1989 Women's World Snooker Championship was a women's snooker tournament that took place from 14 to 21 October 1989. It was the 1989 edition of the World Women's Snooker Championship, first held in 1976. The event was held at the Pontins resort in Brixham.

The tournament was won by defending champion Allison Fisher, who defeated Ann-Marie Farren 6–5 in the final and received £3,500 prize money. This was Fisher's fourth world snooker title in five years, and she would go on to win a total of seven championships before focusing her efforts on pool in the United States from 1995.

== Main draw ==
Last 16; Best of 7 frames
Allison Fisher (ENG)	4
Sarah Smith (ENG)	1
Tessa Davidson (ENG)	4
Kim Shaw (ENG)	2
Karen Corr (NIR)	4
Angela Jones (ENG)	2
Mandy Fisher (ENG)	4
Diane Dales (AUS)	3
Ann-Marie Farren (ENG)	4
Lisa Gordon (ENG)	0
Georgina Aplin (ENG)	4
Margaret Simmons (ENG)	3
Lynette Horsburgh (SCO)	4
Caroline Walch (ENG)	3
Stacey Hillyard (ENG)	4
Margaret O'Driscoll (IRL)	0

Quarter-finals; Best of 7 frames
Allison Fisher (ENG)	4
Tessa Davidson (ENG)	0
Karen Corr (NIR)	4
Mandy Fisher (ENG)	1
Ann-Marie Farren (ENG)	4
Georgina Aplin (ENG)
Lynette Horsburgh (SCO)	2
Stacey Hillyard (ENG)	4

Semi-finals; Best of 9 frames
Allison Fisher (ENG)	5
Karen Corr (NIR)	0
Ann-Marie Farren (ENG)	5
Stacey Hillyard (ENG)	3

Final; Best of 11 frames
Allison Fisher (ENG)	6
Ann-Marie Farren (ENG)	5
