= 1986 Women's World Championship (snooker) =

Women's snooker event, held October 1986

Tournament information
- Dates: 9–12 October 1986
- Venue: Breaks
- City: Solihull
- Country: England
- Organisation: World Ladies Billiards and Snooker Association
- Format: Single elimination
- Highest break: Allison Fisher (84)

Final
- Champion: Allison Fisher (ENG)
- Runner-up: Sue LeMaich (CAN)
- Score: 5–0

The 1986 Women's World Championship was a women's snooker tournament organised by the World Ladies Billiards and Snooker Association and held in Solihull from 9 to 12 October 1986. The event is recognised as the 1986 edition of the World Women's Snooker Championship first held in 1976. Allison Fisher defeated Sue LeMaich 5–0 in the final to win the title.

Defending champion Allison Fisher, who had not lost a match to another woman player for two years, reached the semi-final without losing a frame. The only frame she lost during the tournament was in her 4–1 defeat of Angela Jones in the semi-final. Fisher retained her title with a 5–0 whitewash of Sue LeMaich in the final. Fisher's break of 84 against Lynette Horsburgh in the last 16 round was a new championship record and remained the highest of that year's competition.

== Main Draw ==
Fourth round Best of 5 frames
(England) Allison Fisher | 3
(Scotland) Lynette Horsburgh | 0
(England) Georgina Aplin | 3
(England) Caroline Walch | 1
(England) Mandy Fisher | 3
(Wales) S. Newbury | 0
(England) Angela Jones | 3
(Australia) S. Martin | 0
(England) Stacey Hillyard | 3
(England) J. Dowen | 1
(Canada) Sue LeMaich | 3
(England) A. Davies | 1
(England) Kim Shaw | 3
(England) S. Sinanan | 1
(England) Maria Tart | 3
(Wales) H. Isitt | 0

Quarter-finals; Best of 7 frames
(England) Allison Fisher | 4
(England) Georgina Aplin | 0
(England) Mandy Fisher | 2
(England) Angela Jones | 4
(England) Stacey Hillyard | 3
(Canada) Sue LeMaich | 4
(England) Kim Shaw | 4
(England) Maria Tart | 0

Semi-finals; Best of 7 frames
(England) Allison Fisher | 4
(England) Angela Jones | 1
(Canada) Sue LeMaich | 4
(England) Kim Shaw | 3

Final; Best of 9 frames
(England) Allison Fisher | 5
(Canada) Sue LeMaich | 0
