= 1991 Women's World Snooker Championship =

Trusthouse Forte Women's World Snooker Championship
Tournament information
- Dates: 6-10 November 1991 (Quarter-Finals onwards)
- Venue: Hyde Park Hotel (and other venues for qualifying)
- City: London (and other locations for qualifying)
- Country: United Kingdom
- Format: Single elimination
- Total prize fund: £40,000
- Winner's share: £12,000
- Highest break: 103 Allison Fisher

Final
- Champion: (England) Allison Fisher
- Runner-up: (Northern Ireland) Karen Corr
- Score: 8–2

The 1991 Women's World Snooker Championship was a women's snooker tournament played at various venues in the United Kingdom in 1991. Allison Fisher beat Karen Corr 8–2 in the final to win the title, and made a championship record break of 103 in the qualifying rounds.

== Tournament summary ==
The event attracted seventy-one players, from nine countries. There were eight regional qualifying events, with the winner of each event progressing to the quarter-finals of the tournament. The competition was promoted by Barry Hearn's Matchroom organisation and sponsored by Trusthouse Forte with total prize fund of £40,000. The winner, Allison Fisher received £12,000 as the champion, and Karen Corr received £6,000 as runner-up. The losing semi-finalists received £3,000 each, and the losing quarter-finalists £1,250 each. All of the matches were played in venues managed by the tournament's sponsor, Trusthouse Forte.

Fisher made a break of 103 in her match against Fran Hoad, the first century break in the history of the women's world snooker championship.

The quarter-finals onwards were played at the Hyde Park Hotel in London, and received television coverage on the European satellite channel Screensport.

Mandy Fisher gave birth to a son 96 hours before her quarter-final match with Allison Fisher, and was breastfeeding him ten minutes before the match started. Mandy Fisher scored only 48 points whilst losing the match 0–5.

Corr won the first frame of her semi-final against Tessa Davidson with a fluked pot of the black ball. She then won the second on a re-spotted black, and later the fourth frame with a fluked blue ball on her way to a 5–0 win. In the other semi-final, Fisher beat Stacey Hillyard 5–2 in a match where both players made numerous errors.

The final was played on 10 November 1991, which was Corr's 22nd birthday. In the first fame, Corr made a break of 82 which earned her a prize of £400 for the highest break in the televised stages of the tournament. Fisher then took the second frame, before Corr won the third to lead 2–1. Fisher then won the last seven frames in dominant style to win 8–2, finishing the match with a break of 44. As champion, Fisher received an invitation to compete in the 1992 Matchroom League, which, like the women's world championship had been, was sponsored by Trusthouse Forte and promoted by Barry Hearn.

== Qualifying ==
No matches before the semi-finals of any of the qualifying events are shown.

Event 1: Duke's Head, King's Lynn

Semi-finals; Best-of-7 frames
(Northern Ireland) Karen Corr	4
(England) Isabelle Phelps	0
(England) Sarah Smith	4
(England) Lisa Quick	2

Final; Best-of-7 frames
(Northern Ireland) Karen Corr	4
(England) Sarah Smith	1

Event 2: Forte Crest, Swansea
(Only the result of the final is available in the source used)

Final; Best-of-7 frames
(England) Georgina Aplin	4
(England) Margaret Campion	3

Event 3: Roebuck Hotel, Buckhurst Hill

Semi-finals; Best-of-7 frames
(England) Mandy Fisher	4
(Canada) Sheri Richardson	0
(Wales) Sharon Dickson	4
(England) Dawn Wells	0

Final; Best-of-7 frames
(England) Mandy Fisher	4
(Wales) Sharon Dickson	2

Event 4: Forte Crest, Portsmouth

Semi-finals; Best-of-7 frames
(England) June Banks	4
(Canada) Grace Nakamura	2
(England) Stacey Hillyard	4
(England) Helen Tredinnick	0

Final; Best-of-7 frames
(England) June Banks	1
(England) Stacey Hillyard	4

Event 5: Forte Post House, Glasgow

Semi-finals; Best-of-7 frames
(Scotland) Lynette Horsburgh	4
(Isle of Man) Jane Moss	0
(England) Kim Shaw	4
(Republic of Ireland) Jan McGregor	1

Final; Best-of-7 frames
(Scotland) Lynette Horsburgh	1
(England) Kim Shaw	4

Event 6: Randolph Hotel, Oxford

Semi-finals; Best-of-7 frames
(England) Tessa Davidson	4
(England) Michelle Brown	1
(Scotland) Julie Gillespie	4
(England) Caroline Walch	1

Final; Best-of-7 frames
(England) Tessa Davidson	4
(Scotland) Julie Gillespie	0

Event 7: Forte Crest, Nottingham

Semi-finals; Best-of-7 frames
(Scotland) Sue Thompson	4
(England) Maria Tart	3
(England) Ann-Marie Farren	4
(Canada) Maureen Seto	1

Final; Best-of-7 frames
(England) Sue Thompson	2
(England) Ann-Marie Farren	4

Event 8: Burford Bridge Hotel, Dorking

Semi-finals; Best-of-7 frames
(England) Allison Fisher	4
(England) Jenny Poulter	1
(Australia) Fran Hoad	4
(England) Lisa Gordon	2

Final; Best-of-7 frames
(England) Allison Fisher	4
(Australia) Fran Hoad	0

== Main draw ==
Source: Snooker Scene, December 1991

Quarter-finals; Best-of-9 frames
(Northern Ireland) Karen Corr	5
(England) Kim Shaw	0
(England) Ann-Marie Farren	3
(England) Tessa Davidson	5
(England) Stacey Hillyard	5
(England) Georgina Aplin	0
(England) Mandy Fisher	0
(England) Allison Fisher	5

Semi-finals; Best-of-9 frames
(Northern Ireland) Karen Corr	5
(England) Tessa Davidson	0
(England) Stacey Hillyard	2
(England) Allison Fisher	5

Final; Best-of-15 frames
(Northern Ireland) Karen Corr	2
(England) Allison Fisher	8

== Final ==
Final: Best-of-15 frames. Hyde Park Hotel, London; 10 November 1991
Allison Fisher (England)			8–2			Karen Corr (Northern Ireland)				
Frame	1	2	3	4	5	6	7	8	9	10
Allison Fisher; 30+ Breaks	7 -	64 -	33 -	64 (51)	75 -	80 (57)	66 -	77 -	73 (51)	72 (44)
Karen Corr; 30+ Breaks	82 (82)	1 -	56 -	57 (43)	44 (31)	21 -	56 (34)	5 -	8 -	39 -
Frames won (Fisher first)	0–1	1–1	1–2	2–2	3–2	4–2	5–2	6–2	7–2	8–2
57			Highest break			82				
3			50+ breaks			1				
1			30+ breaks			3				
Allison Fisher wins the 1991 Women's World Snooker Championship
