= Big Break =

British television game show (1991–2002)

- Genre: Sports game show
- Created by: Roger Medcalf; Mike Kemp; Terry Mardell
- Directed by: Nick Hurran (Series 1–2); Charles Garland (Series 3–5); Babara Jones (Series 6); Phil Chilvers (Series 7); Richard Valentine (Series 7–8); Duncan Cooper (Series 9); Sue McMahon (Series 10)
- Presented by: Jim Davidson; Paddy McGuinness
- Starring: John Virgo; Stephen Hendry
- Announcer: Colin Ward Lewis; Zora Suleman; Charles Nove
- Theme music composer: "The Snooker Song" by Captain Sensible
- Composer: Mike Batt
- Country of origin: United Kingdom
- Original language: English
- No. of series: 10
- No. of episodes: 216 (inc. 17 specials)

Production
- Producers: John Burrowes (Series 1–7 & Stars of the Future Series 1–2); Geoff Miles (Series 8 & 10); David G. Taylor (Series 9 & Stars of the Future Series 3)
- Production locations: BBC Elstree Centre (Series 1–4); BBC Television Centre (Series 5–10)
- Running time: 30 minutes
- Production companies: BBC (1991–2002); Naked West and Vibrant Television (2026–)

Original release
- Network: BBC1
- Release: 30 April 1991 – 9 October 2002
- Network: BBC Two
- Release: 2026 – present

Related
- Full Swing

Big Break is a British game show that aired on BBC1 from 30 April 1991 to 9 October 2002, and again from 2026, this time on BBC Two. It was originally hosted by Jim Davidson with John Virgo as referee, being revived with Paddy McGuinness as the new host, and Stephen Hendry as the new referee. The programme focuses on teams consisting of a contestant and a professional snooker player competing in rounds that involve snooker, with the best team eventually seeing its player seeking to win prizes for their contestant.

== History ==
The idea of a snooker-related television game show was first thought of by Roger Medcalf in 1987 who then collaborated with Mike Kemp. Kemp and Medcalf both produced a written format in 1987 where it was called The Big Break and it went through a number of versions, Kemp then proposed to Medcalf that they should try to get Terry Mardell interested, Mardell was an expert in relation to quiz shows, which was also during that year Mardell devised a successful bingo-related quiz show called Bob's Full House. Mardell agreed to meet Kemp and Medcalf in his office to discuss the snooker-related game that the two men came up with and showed Mardell their written format for the show, Mardell's immediate response was that it was far too complicated, would take far too long and would cost far too much, but he was willing to help them in a further meeting that would take place in his flat where the three men would further discuss and contribute various suggestions to the idea. That meeting produced a further version of the format and afterwards Kemp was left to retype the format where it was called "the June format". It was first practised at King's Cross Snooker Club where a week later, the three men met again to work out how the game could be improved with a view to a presentation to the BBC. They attended the presentation as well as Jim Moir and Kevin Bishop from the BBC where they were sufficiently interested to agree to have rehearsals at the BBC's Acton Studios in October.

On 12 May 2026, it was announced that the series would be revived as a daytime game show on BBC Two, with Paddy McGuinness and former Snooker player Stephen Hendry as presenters. The revival will be produced by Fremantle UK division Naked West under a co-production agreement with Vibrant Television, while Fremantle and All3Media International would share distribution rights.

== Format ==
In each episode of the game show, three contestants are each paired up with a professional snooker player when a yellow ball, a blue ball or a red ball are drawn – while the contestant tackles questions given by the host, the player handles the snooker-based challenges in each round. Although a game show, Davidson and Virgo (McGuinness and Hendry in the revival run) usually interject comedy into each episode, including a brief stand-up routine at the beginning of an episode before the introduction of the contestants and players. Although the first two rounds have their own rules, the last two stick to traditional regulation snooker rules regarding potting balls – colours being potted only after a red is potted – although with six red balls used in these rounds except the first round (Red Hot) which has ten red balls. The snooker table on this game show has one colour on each pocket (Corner Pockets: Brown, Blue, Pink and Black, Central Side Pockets: Yellow and Green).

The programme features four rounds:

- Red Hot – Each contestant is given three questions, in which their answer denotes the amount of time their snooker player has to pot as many of the ten red balls on the snooker table as they possibly can. The player is allowed to break before time begins, meaning that any red balls that are potted in this period counts towards their final score. In early series, players were given 10 seconds, with each correct answer a contestant gave adding an additional 10 seconds. By later series, the format was changed, with the player having 40 seconds, minus five seconds to any incorrect answers the contestant gave. The team with the lowest score are eliminated at the end of the round.
- Virgo's Trick Shot/Hendry's Trick Shot – A mini-game styled round, in which the contestant eliminated in the first round (Red Hot) is given the opportunity to win a consolation prize. Virgo (Hendry in the revival run) demonstrates a type of trick shot, which the contestant must recreate themselves, in order to win the prize.
- Pocket Money – Each contestant's player tackles a traditional game of snooker (although there are only six red balls on the table), along standard rules of potting, getting as many balls as they can within 90 seconds. Each ball on the table is denoted with both a cash amount – based on their regulation point in Snooker (i.e. Reds being one point are thus earn £10 when potted) – and a category of questions that Davidson (McGuinness in the revival run) can asks the contestants. If the player pots a ball in the same coloured pocket, the cash amount earned is doubled (i.e. potting Brown in its own colour pocket doubles the amount from £40 to £80, Blue from £50 to £100, Pink from £60 to £120 and Black from £70 to £140). If the player hits a ball but fails to pot it, they must stop and wait until their contestant answers a question correctly, based on the ball's connected subject, in order to resume (i.e. Red questions are based on Pot Luck meaning General Knowledge, Yellow based on the Past meaning Historic events, Green based on Music including Instruments, Composers, Artists, Albums and even TV Sports Themes, Brown based on Places meaning Geography including Venues and Landmarks, Blue based on People including with famous Pet Animals, Pink based on Sports including ranking and non-ranking tourneys, Olympic and Commonwealth games and even TV Sports Themes and Black based on Screens meaning TV programmes, Films, Channels and even TV Sports Themes), with the timer not stopped during this period. A coin toss decides which team begins first, with the team with the lowest score being eliminated at the end of the round.
- Make or Break – The final contestant is given 90 seconds to answer five questions correctly, after the player breaks the six reds on the table. Once all questions are answered, the timer is paused, with each correct answer allowing the player to remove one red ball from the table, leaving a minimum of one red left. Once their choices are made, if possible, the player begins potting balls in the remainder of the 90 seconds. Each coloured ball, when potted in order, offers the contestant a prize, with the grand prize won when the black is finally potted. However, the player must pot all the reds, before they can begin with the next colour in the sequence. If the black isn't potted, the contestant leaves with the money earned in Pocket Money, plus the red prize, and the highest coloured prize achieved when the time ran out.

== Snooker-player partners ==
=== Series 1 (1991) ===
- Show 1 (30 April 1991) – Stephen Hendry, Mike Hallett, Joe Johnson
- Show 2 (7 May 1991) – Stacey Hillyard, Willie Thorne, Dennis Taylor
- Show 3 (14 May 1991) – Ray Reardon, Alex Higgins, John Campbell
- Show 4 (21 May 1991) – Tony Knowles, Tony Meo, John Spencer
- Show 5 (28 May 1991) – Allison Fisher, James Wattana, Silvino Francisco
- Show 6 (4 June 1991) – Cliff Thorburn, Steve James, Neal Foulds
- Show 7 (11 June 1991) – Alex Higgins, Ray Reardon, John Campbell
- Show 8 (18 June 1991) – Stephen Hendry, Mike Hallett, Joe Johnson
- Show 9 (25 June 1991) – Dennis Taylor, Tony Drago, Ray Reardon
- Show 10 (2 July 1991) – Allison Fisher, Silvino Francisco, James Wattana
- Show 11 (9 July 1991) – Cliff Thorburn, Steve James, Neal Foulds
- Show 12 (16 July 1991) – Ray Reardon, Tony Drago, Dennis Taylor

=== Series 2 (1992) ===
- Show 1 (11 January 1992) – Jimmy White, Warren King, Cliff Thorburn
- Show 2 (18 January 1992) – Dennis Taylor, Tony Drago, Mike Hallett
- Show 3 (25 January 1992) – Neal Foulds, Tony Knowles, David Taylor
- Show 4 (1 February 1992) – Joe Johnson, Ray Reardon, Terry Griffiths
- Show 5 (8 February 1992) – Allison Fisher, Willie Thorne, Steve James
- Show 6 (15 February 1992) – Dean Reynolds, Dene O'Kane, Gary Wilkinson
- Show 7 (22 February 1992) – Tony Knowles, John Spencer, Tony Meo
- Show 8 (29 February 1992) – Cliff Thorburn, Warren King, Jimmy White
- Show 9 (7 March 1992) – Dennis Taylor, Willie Thorne, Stacey Hillyard
- Show 10 (14 March 1992) – Tony Knowles, Neal Foulds, David Taylor
- Show 11 (21 March 1992) – Mike Hallett, Tony Drago, Dennis Taylor
- Show 12 (28 March 1992) – Terry Griffiths, Ray Reardon, Joe Johnson
- Show 13 (4 April 1992) – Allison Fisher, Steve James, Willie Thorne

=== Series 3 (1992) ===
- Show 1 (12 September 1992) – Stephen Hendry, Peter Ebdon, Darren Morgan
- Show 2 (19 September 1992) – Cliff Thorburn, Ken Doherty, Terry Griffiths
- Show 3 (26 September 1992) – Tony Knowles, Stacey Hillyard, Ronnie O'Sullivan
- Show 4 (3 October 1992) – Ray Reardon, Dene O'Kane, Mike Hallett
- Show 5 (10 October 1992) – Paul Davies, Alan McManus, Steve James
- Show 6 (17 October 1992) – Allison Fisher, Willie Thorne, Dennis Taylor
- Show 7 (24 October 1992) – Karen Corr, Mark Johnston-Allen, Gary Wilkinson
- Show 8 (31 October 1992) – Tony Knowles, Stacey Hillyard, Ronnie O'Sullivan
- Show 9 (7 November 1992) – David Taylor, Joe Swail, Nigel Bond
- Show 10 (14 November 1992) – Alan McManus, Paul Davies, Steve James
- Show 11 (21 November 1992) – Dene O'Kane, Ray Reardon, Mike Hallett
- Show 12 (28 November 1992) – Karen Corr, Mark Johnston-Allen, Gary Wilkinson
- Show 13 (5 December 1992) – Stephen Hendry, Peter Ebdon, Darren Morgan
- Show 14 (12 December 1992) – David Taylor, Nigel Bond, Joe Swail
- Show 15 (19 December 1992) – Terry Griffiths, Ken Doherty, Cliff Thorburn

=== Series 4 (1993–94) ===
- Show 1 (4 September 1993) – Dennis Taylor, Tony Drago, Martin Clark
- Show 2 (11 September 1993) – Terry Griffiths, Ken Doherty, Peter Ebdon
- Show 3 (18 September 1993) – Mike Hallett, David Taylor, Ronnie O'Sullivan
- Show 4 (25 September 1993) – Gary Wilkinson, Nigel Bond, Tony Drago
- Show 5 (2 October 1993) – Stephen Hendry, Steve Davis, Alain Robidoux
- Show 6 (9 October 1993) – Steve Lemmens, Alan McManus, Peter Ebdon
- Show 7 (23 October 1993) – Ray Reardon, Joe Swail, Tony Knowles
- Show 8 (30 October 1993) – Dennis Taylor, Paul Davies, David Roe
- Show 9 (6 November 1993) – Jimmy White, Stacey Hillyard, Darren Morgan
- Show 10 (13 November 1993) – Allison Fisher, Willie Thorne, Steve James
- Show 11 (20 November 1993) – Terry Griffiths, David Roe, Mark Johnston-Allen
- Show 12 (27 November 1993) – Ray Reardon, Ronnie O'Sullivan, Troy Shaw
- Show 13 (4 December 1993) – Jimmy White, Dene O'Kane, Gary Wilkinson
- Show 14 (11 December 1993) – Allison Fisher, Willie Thorne, Peter Ebdon
- Show 15 (18 December 1993) – Cliff Wilson, Darren Morgan, Paul Davies
- Show 16 (1 January 1994) – Steve Davis, Peter Ebdon, Terry Griffiths
- Show 17 (8 January 1994) – John Parrott, Oliver King, David Roe
- Show 18 (22 January 1994) – Jimmy White, Tony Meo, Tony Drago
- Show 19 (29 January 1994) – Lynette Horsburgh, Allison Fisher, Karen Corr
- Show 20 (5 February 1994) – Ken Doherty, Tony Knowles, Mike Hallett
- Show 21 (12 February 1994) – Ray Reardon, Rex Williams, Ray Edmonds
- Show 22 (19 February 1994) – Steve Davis, Dene O'Kane, Steve James
- Show 23 (26 February 1994) – Mike Hallett, Silvino Francisco, Joe Swail
- Show 24 (5 March 1994) – Jimmy White, Jonathan Birch, Neil Mosley
- Show 25 (12 March 1994) – John Parrott, Ken Doherty, Steve Lemmens
- Show 26 (19 March 1994) – Joe Johnson, Paul Davies, David Taylor
- Show 27 (26 March 1994) – Ronnie O'Sullivan, Alan McManus, Joe Swail

=== Series 5 (1994–95) ===
- Show 1 (9 September 1994) – Steve Davis, Steve James, Mark King
- Show 2 (16 September 1994) – Peter Ebdon, Ken Doherty, Les Dodd
- Show 3 (23 September 1994) – Willie Thorne, David Roe, Troy Shaw
- Show 4 (30 September 1994) – Stephen Hendry, Terry Griffiths, Paul Davies
- Show 5 (7 October 1994) – Dennis Taylor, Ronnie O'Sullivan, Allison Fisher
- Show 6 (14 October 1994) – Ken Doherty, Darren Morgan, Oliver King
- Show 7 (21 October 1994) – Karen Corr, Stacey Hillyard, Lynette Horsburgh
- Show 8 (28 October 1994) – Tony Knowles, Neal Foulds, Fergal O'Brien
- Show 9 (7 January 1995) – Willie Thorne, Surinder Gill, Paul Davies
- Show 10 (14 January 1995) – Stephen Hendry, John Parrott, Andy Hicks
- Show 11 (21 January 1995) – Peter Ebdon, Nigel Bond, Mike Hallett
- Show 12 (28 January 1995) – Darren Morgan, Mark Davis, Neal Foulds
- Show 13 (4 February 1995) – Allison Fisher, Martin Clark, Joe Swail
- Show 14 (11 February 1995) – Dennis Taylor, John Higgins, David Roe
- Show 15 (18 February 1995) – Jimmy White, Ray Reardon, Mark King
- Show 16 (25 February 1995) – Willie Thorne, Gary Wilkinson, Billy Snaddon
- Show 17 (4 March 1995) – John Parrott, Steve Davis, Hitesh Lakhani
- Show 18 (11 March 1995) – Ken Doherty, Joe Swail, Paul Davies
- Show 19 (18 March 1995) – Allison Fisher, Alan McManus, Mark Davis
- Show 20 (25 March 1995) – Dennis Taylor, Tony Drago, David Roe
- Show 21 (1 April 1995) – Ronnie O'Sullivan, Ray Reardon, Jason Ferguson
- Show 22 (8 April 1995) – Peter Ebdon, Ken Doherty, Gerard Greene
- Show 23 (15 April 1995) – Willie Thorne, Joe Swail, Oliver King
- Show 24 (22 April 1995) – Jimmy White, Tony Drago, Les Dodd
- Show 25 (29 April 1995) – Dennis Taylor, Terry Griffiths, Joe Johnson
- Show 26 (6 May 1995) – Alan McManus, Peter Ebdon, Neal Foulds
- Show 27 (20 May 1995) – Steve Davis, John Parrott, John Higgins

=== Series 6 (1995–96) ===
- Show 1 (2 September 1995) – Ken Doherty, Mike Hallett, Darren Morgan
- Show 2 (9 September 1995) – Jimmy White, David Roe, Tony Meo
- Show 3 (16 September 1995) – John Parrott, Peter Ebdon, Paul Davies
- Show 4 (23 September 1995) – Stephen Hendry, Jimmy Chambers, Mark Johnston-Allen
- Show 5 (30 September 1995) – Willie Thorne, Terry Griffiths, Gerard Greene
- Show 6 (7 October 1995) – Nigel Bond, Tony Knowles, Mark King
- Show 7 (14 October 1995) – Steve Davis, Ronnie O'Sullivan, Mark Davis
- Show 8 (2 March 1996) – Jimmy White, Paul Davies, Dean Reynolds
- Show 9 (9 March 1996) – Allison Fisher, Karen Corr, Lynette Horsburgh
- Show 10 (16 March 1996) – Mike Hallett, Gary Wilkinson, Stephen O'Connor
- Show 11 (23 March 1996) – Dieter Jones, John Parrott, Stephen Murphy
- Show 12 (30 March 1996) – Willie Thorne, Joe Johnson, Mark Davis
- Show 13 (6 April 1996) – Ronnie O'Sullivan, Billy Snaddon, Tony Knowles
- Show 14 (13 April 1996) – Steve Davis, Lee Richardson, Mark Johnston-Allen
- Show 15 (20 April 1996) – Stephen Hendry, Peter Ebdon, Oliver King
- Show 16 (27 April 1996) – John Parrott, Gary Wilkinson, Drew Henry
- Show 17 (4 May 1996) – Tony Knowles, Mark Williams, Neal Foulds
- Show 18 (10 May 1996) – Dennis Taylor, David Roe, Jason Ferguson
- Show 19 (17 May 1996) – Stephen Hendry, Mario Geudens, Terry Griffiths
- Show 20 (24 May 1996) – Joe Swail, Dave Harold, Joe Johnson
- Show 21 (31 May 1996) – Ray Edmonds, David Taylor, Ray Reardon
- Show 22 (14 June 1996) – Jimmy White, Chris Small, Nigel Bond
- Show 23 (21 June 1996) – Dennis Taylor, Andy Hicks, Jimmy Michie
- Show 24 (28 June 1996) – Steve Davis, Neal Foulds, Les Dodd
- Show 25 (5 July 1996) – Willie Thorne, Martin Clark, Ronnie O'Sullivan
- Show 26 (12 July 1996) – Allison Fisher, John Higgins, Ken Doherty
- Show 27 (19 July 1996) – Dennis Taylor, Joe Swail, Anthony Hamilton

=== Series 7 (1996–97) ===
- Show 1 (3 January 1997) – John Parrott, Paul Davies, Mark Bennett
- Show 2 (10 January 1997) – Peter Ebdon, Gary Wilkinson, Mark King
- Show 3 (17 January 1997) – Ray Reardon, Jason Ferguson, Mick Price
- Show 4 (24 January 1997) – Willie Thorne, Andy Hicks, Les Dodd
- Show 5 (31 January 1997) – Dennis Taylor, Mark Davis, John Virgo, Billy Snaddon
- Show 6 (7 February 1997) – Ronnie O'Sullivan, Paul Davies, Darren Morgan
- Show 7 (14 February 1997) – Jimmy White, Gary Wilkinson, Rod Lawler
- Show 8 (21 February 1997) – Stephen Hendry, Mark Davis, Mark Williams
- Show 9 (28 February 1997) – Terry Griffiths, Shokat Ali, Lee Richardson
- Show 10 (7 March 1997) – Alex Higgins, Joe Swail, Stephen Murphy
- Show 11 (21 March 1997) – Tony Knowles, John Parrott, David Taylor
- Show 12 (28 March 1997) – Paul Hunter, Paul Davies, Peter Ebdon
- Show 13 (4 April 1997) – Steve Davis, David Roe, Alain Robidoux
- Show 14 (11 April 1997) – Stephen Hendry, Mark Johnston-Allen, Gerard Greene
- Show 15 (18 April 1997) – Jimmy White, Matthew Stevens, Darren Morgan
- Show 16 (9 June 1997) – Alex Higgins, Ray Reardon, David Roe
- Show 17 (16 June 1997) – Rex Williams, John Spencer, Graham Miles
- Show 18 (23 June 1997) – Dennis Taylor, Dave Harold, Oliver King
- Show 19 (7 July 1997) – Steve Davis, Martin Clark, Mark Davis
- Show 20 (14 July 1997) – Peter Ebdon, Joe Johnson, Ken Doherty
- Show 21 (9 January 1998) – Jimmy White, Andy Hicks, Nigel Bond
- Show 22 (16 January 1998) – Willie Thorne, Lee Richardson, David Roe
- Show 23 (23 January 1998) – Dennis Taylor, Neal Foulds, Gerard Greene
- Show 24 (30 January 1998) – Dieter Jones, Craig MacGillivray, Steve Davis
- Show 25 (6 February 1998) – John Parrott, Ken Doherty, Joe Johnson
- Show 26 (13 February 1998) – Mike Hallet, Nick Pearce, Terry Griffiths
- Show 27 (20 February 1998) – Tony Knowles, Alain Robidoux, David Taylor
- Show 28 (27 February 1998) – Stephen Hendry, Neal Foulds, Anthony Davies

=== Series 8 (1997) ===
- Show 1 (6 March 1998) – Ken Doherty, Joe Swail, Oliver King
- Show 2 (4 April 1998) – Peter Ebdon, Darren Morgan, Dennis Taylor
- Show 3 (11 April 1998) – Tony Drago, Stephen Murphy, Willie Thorne
- Show 4 (18 April 1998) – Nigel Bond, Andy Hicks, John Higgins
- Show 5 (25 April 1998) – David Taylor, Ray Reardon, Rex Williams
- Show 6 (2 May 1998) – Mark Davis, John Higgins, Gary Wilkinson
- Show 7 (16 May 1998) – John Parrott, Darren Morgan, Lee Walker
- Show 8 (23 May 1998) – Tony Drago, John Higgins, Mark King
- Show 9 (6 June 1998) – Steve Davis, Neal Foulds, Paul Hunter
- Show 10 (13 June 1998) – John Parrott, Martin Clark, Lee Richardson
- Show 11 (18 July 1998) – Tony Drago, Ray Reardon, Dennis Taylor
- Show 12 (13 February 1999) – Ken Doherty, Nick Pearce, David Roe
- Show 13 (20 February 1999) – Jonathan Birch, Mike Hallett, Jimmy Michie
- Show 14 (27 February 1999) – Andy Hicks, Dennis Taylor, Willie Thorne
- Show 15 (13 March 1999) – Tony Chappel, John Parrott, Matthew Stevens
- Show 16 (20 March 1999) – Steve Davis, David Roe, Jamie Woodman
- Show 17 (27 March 1999) – Joe Johnson, Dene O'Kane, Lee Richardson
- Show 18 (10 April 1999) – Mark Davis, Tony Knowles, Jimmy White
- Show 19 (17 April 1999) – Peter Ebdon, Stephen Hendry, Mark King
- Show 20 (24 April 1999) – Mark Davis, Jason Ferguson, Ronnie O'Sullivan
- Show 21 (1 May 1999) – Nigel Bond, Stephen Hendry, Terry Murphy
- Show 22 (15 May 1999) – Peter Ebdon, Gary Wilkinson, Jimmy White
- Show 23 (22 May 1999) – Paul Davies, Gerard Greene, Stephen Hendry
- Show 24 (12 June 1999) – Terry Griffiths, Ronnie O'Sullivan, Jimmy White
- Show 25 (26 June 1999) – Gerard Greene, Terry Griffiths, Mark Williams
- Show 26 (4 December 1999) – Joe Johnson, Mark Williams, Jimmy White

=== Series 9 (1998) ===
- Show 1 (18 December 1999) – Joe Johnson, Peter Ebdon, John Parrott
- Show 2 (5 January 2000) – John Higgins, David Roe, Joe Swail
- Show 3 (12 January 2000) – Lee Richardson, Mark King, John Parrott
- Show 4 (14 January 2000) – Joe Johnson, Paul Davies, Dennis Taylor
- Show 5 (19 January 2000) – David Taylor, Rex Williams, Ray Reardon
- Show 6 (26 January 2000) – Oliver King, Peter Ebdon, Steve James
- Show 7 (2 February 2000) – Quinten Hann, Brian Morgan, John Higgins
- Show 8 (9 February 2000) – Darren Morgan, Andy Hicks, Lee Richardson
- Show 9 (16 February 2000) – Steve Davis, Paul Hunter, David Roe
- Show 10 (23 February 2000) – Ken Doherty, Mark Davis, Nigel Bond
- Show 11 (15 March 2000) – John Higgins, Tony Drago, Graeme Dott
- Show 12 (20 March 2000) – Steve Davis, Matthew Stevens, Dean Reynolds
- Show 13 (24 March 2000) – Paul Wykes, Ray Reardon, Dennis Taylor
- Show 14 (27 March 2000) – Darren Morgan, Willie Thorne, Anthony Davies
- Show 15 (29 March 2000) – Peter Ebdon, Tony Drago, Alfie Burden
- Show 16 (30 March 2000) – Gerard Greene, Willie Thorne, Andy Hicks
- Show 17 (31 March 2000) – Jimmy White, Mark Davis, Matthew Stevens
- Show 18 (27 May 2000) – Ken Doherty, Terry Griffiths, Gerard Greene
- Show 19 (3 June 2000) – Dominic Dale, Tony Drago, Joe Swail
- Show 20 (10 June 2000) – Gary Wilkinson, Anthony Hamilton, John Parrott
- Show 21 (22 July 2000) – Ken Doherty, Bradley Jones, Gerard Greene
- Show 22 (28 April 2001) – Steve Davis, Dave Harold, Craig MacGillivray
- Show 23 (5 May 2001) – Peter Ebdon, Mark King, Karen Corr
- Show 24 (12 May 2001) – Ken Doherty, Neal Foulds, Terry Griffiths
- Show 25 (19 May 2001) – Dennis Taylor, Paul Hunter, Martin Clark

=== Series 10 (2001) ===
- Show 1 (16 June 2001) – Ken Doherty, Stephen Hendry, Ronnie O'Sullivan
- Show 2 (23 June 2001) – Tony Drago, David Roe, Joe Johnson
- Show 3 (30 June 2001) – Steve Davis, David Gray, Joe Perry
- Show 4 (14 July 2001) – Dave Harold, Mark King, John Parrott
- Show 5 (21 July 2001) – Ken Doherty, Fergal O'Brien, Jimmy White
- Show 6 (28 July 2001) – Nigel Bond, Peter Ebdon, Darren Morgan
- Show 7 (11 August 2001) – Tony Drago, David Roe, Joe Johnson
- Show 8 (18 August 2001) – Anthony Hamilton, Matthew Stevens, Willie Thorne
- Show 9 (22 June 2002) – Ryan Day, Ronnie O'Sullivan, Ray Reardon
- Show 10 (29 June 2002) – Kelly Fisher, Paul Hunter, Steve Davis
- Show 11 (6 July 2002) – Bradley Jones, Shaun Murphy, John Parrott
- Show 12 (13 July 2002) – Paul Hunter, Stephen Lee, Jimmy Michie
- Show 13 (20 July 2002) – Stephen Hendry, Ray Reardon, Jimmy White
- Show 14 (10 August 2002) – Michael Judge, Tony Knowles, Willie Thorne
- Show 15 (2 October 2002) – Dominic Dale, Stephen Lee, Lee Richardson
- Show 16 (9 October 2002) – Peter Ebdon, Matthew Stevens, Ali Carter

== Transmissions ==
=== Regular ===
==== Original ====
Series	Start date	End date	Episodes
1	30 April 1991	16 July 1991	12
2	11 January 1992	4 April 1992	13
3	12 September 1992	19 December 1992	15
4	4 September 1993	26 March 1994	27
5	9 September 1994	20 May 1995	27
6	2 September 1995	19 July 1996	27
7	3 January 1997	27 February 1998	28
8	6 March 1998	4 December 1999	26
9	18 December 1999	19 May 2001	25
10	16 June 2001	9 October 2002	16

==== Revival ====
Series	Start date	End date	Episodes
1	TBD	TBD	20

=== Stars of the Future ===
Series	Start date	End date	Episodes
1	27 May 1995	17 June 1995	6
1	11 May 1996	15 July 1996	6
2	23 July 1997	3 September 1997	6
3	3 July 1999	11 December 1999	6

=== Christmas Specials ===
Date	Guests	Snooker Players
24 December 1991	Linda Lusardi, Jean Alexander, Charlie Drake	Stephen Hendry, Steve Davis, Jimmy White
26 December 1992	Ruth Madoc, Patrick Moore, Anthea Turner	Dennis Taylor, Allison Fisher, Willie Thorne
27 December 1993	Bernie Clifton, Vicki Michelle, Tessa Sanderson	Steve Davis, Stephen Hendry, Dennis Taylor
27 December 1994	Zoe Ball, Marti Caine, Craig Charles	John Parrott, Terry Griffiths, Steve Davis
28 December 1995	Wendy Richard, Frank Carson, Diane-Louise Jordan	Ray Reardon, Jimmy White, Peter Ebdon
27 December 1996	Patsy Palmer, Bella Emberg, Floella Benjamin	Steve Davis, John Parrott, Dennis Taylor
26 December 1997	Melanie Stace, Darren Day, June Brown	Peter Ebdon, Ronnie O'Sullivan, Ken Doherty
28 December 1998	Isla Fisher, Little and Large, Barbara Windsor	Jimmy White, John Higgins, John Parrott

=== Trick Shot Specials ===
Date
22 August 1995
29 August 1995
19 October 1995
3 August 1996
29 August 1996
27 June 1997
4 July 1997
23 December 1999
3 January 2000
