= 1985 Women's World Snooker Championship =

Women's snooker event, held October 1985

Tournament information
- Dates: October 1985
- Venue: Breaks Snooker Club
- City: Solihull
- Country: England
- Organisation: World Ladies Billiards and Snooker
- Format: Single elimination
- Total prize fund: £4,000
- Winner's share: £1,250
- Highest break: Allison Fisher (ENG), 54

Final
- Champion: Allison Fisher (ENG)
- Runner-up: Stacey Hillyard (ENG)
- Score: 5–1

The 1985 Women's World Snooker Championship was a women's snooker tournament that took place in October 1985 at Breaks Snooker Club, Solihull. It was the 1985 edition of the World Women's Snooker Championship, first held in 1976. The tournament attracted 78 entrants, although Rhonda Jackson of Canada was the only participant from outside Britain.

The tournament was won by Allison Fisher, who lost only one frame during the event and defeated Stacey Hillyard 5–1 in the final. Fisher led 4–0 in the final, then Hillyard won the next frame. Fisher took the sixth frame to seal her victory. This was Fisher's first world snooker title, at the age of 17, and she would go on to win a total of seven championships before focusing her efforts on pool in the United States from 1995.

The tournament had a total prize fund of £4,000 with contributions from sponsors First Leisure and from Mitchells & Butlers. Fisher received £1,250 for her win. She took a further £100 for the highest break and £50 for the highest clearance of the event, both for her 54 break against Julie Dowen in the quarter-finals. Hillyard was awarded £600 as runner up, losing semi-finalists got £300 each, and losing-quarter-finalists received £150 each.

Many of the seeded players lost in the early rounds. Fourteen-year-old Ann-Marie Farren, participating in a tournament for the second time, eliminated fourth seed Maria Tart. Sixteenth seed Lynette Horsburgh was defeated 2–3 in the first round by Karen Leech.

== Main draw ==
The results of from the last-16 round onwards are shown below.

Last 16
Stacey Hillyard (ENG)	3
Karen Leach (ENG)	1
Kim Shaw (ENG)	3
Lisa Thomas (ENG)	0
Caroline Walch (ENG)	3
Lin Frost (ENG)	0
Ann-Marie Farren (ENG)	3
Teresa Gardiner (ENG)	0
Alyson Ratcliffe (ENG)	3
Rhonda Jackman (CAN)	2
Julie Dowen (ENG)	3
Serena Sinanan (ENG)	0
Karen Corr (IRE)	3
Hilary Isitt (WAL)	1
Allison Fisher (ENG)	3
Liz Jones (ENG)	0

Quarter-finals
Stacey Hillyard (ENG)	4
Kim Shaw (ENG)	2
Caroline Walch (ENG)	4
Ann-Marie Farren (ENG)	0
Alyson Ratcliffe (ENG)	1
Julie Dowen (ENG)	4
Karen Corr (IRE)	0
Allison Fisher (ENG)	4

Semi-finals
Stacey Hillyard (ENG)	4
Caroline Walch (ENG)	2
Julie Dowen (ENG)	0
Allison Fisher (ENG)	4

Final
Stacey Hillyard (ENG)	1
Allison Fisher (ENG)	5
