= Georgina Aplin =

English snooker player

Sport
- Country: England
- Sport: Snooker
- Professional: 1991–92

Georgina Aplin is an English former professional snooker player.

== Career ==
When the World Professional Billiards and Snooker Association (WPBSA) opened membership to anyone over the age of 16 who paid the relevant fee, in 1990, Aplin was one of six women to join, along with Allison Fisher, Ann-Marie Farren, Stacey Hillyard, Karen Corr, and Maureen McCarthy, whilst 443 men joined at the same time. Aplin played only one match as a professional, losing 3–5 to Amrik Cheema in the first qualifying round of the 1992 Strachan Open.

Aplin began playing snooker aged 8 on a small table at home. She practised on a full-sized table from the age of 14, and started playing competitively soon afterwards. She reached several women's snooker finals, including the first event of the 1984 Women's Grand Prix, where she lost 1–6 to Sue Foster. Her first tournament win was at the LHC Snooker Association championship in 1987, where she defeated Hillyard 3–0 in the final. She also won the 1987 Carlsberg North Western Championship with a 3–0 defeat of Ann-Marie Farren in the final. Aplin was a losing quarter-finalist in the World Women's Snooker Championship in 1986, 1987, 1989, 1990, 1991 and 1993.

== Career highlights ==
Outcome	No.	Year	Championship	Opponent in the final	Score	Ref.
Final	1	1984	Women's Grand Prix (Round One)	Sue Foster	1–6	
Final	2	1984	147 ProAm Classic	Allison Fisher	1–4	
Winner	1	1987	LHC Snooker Association Championship	Stacey Hillyard	3–0	
Winner	2	1987	Carlsberg North Western Championship	Ann-Marie Farren	3–0	
Final	3	1989	Southern Championship	Stacey Hillyard	2–3	
Final	4	1989	British Open	Allison Fisher	1–3	
Final	5	1990	Pontin's Ladies Spring Bowl	Stacey Hillyard	0–3	
Final	6	1990	British Open	Karen Corr	0–3	
