= Maryann McConnell =

Canadian snooker and pool player

Personal information
- Born: c. 1950 Canada

Sport
- Country: Canada
- Sport: Snooker
- Highest ranking: 2 (Women's snooker)

Maryann McConnell (born c. 1950) is a Canadian snooker and pool player who has won national championships in snooker, eight-ball and nine-ball. She was runner-up to Mandy Fisher in the 1984 Women's Grand Prix series, recognized by World Women's Snooker as that year's professional world championship, and achieved a highest world ranking of second in women's snooker.

McConnell owned Alberni Valley Billiards in Port Alberni, British Columbia, with her late husband Robin Woodward, and coached and mentored junior players there. She returned to the World Women's Snooker circuit after a 28-year absence at the 2023 US Open, reaching the quarter-finals. At the 2024 edition, she won the Challenge Cup and was runner-up in the seniors competition.

== Biography ==
Maryann McConnell was born c. 1950. She lived in Saskatoon as a young child, where her grandfather had a full-sized snooker table in his basement. She began playing regularly at the age of 24 while studying at the University of Guelph, where she studied fine art. In a 2024 interview, she recalled that she had been in the student union building when she heard the noise of the balls from the snooker tables there; "And I opened the door to the games room, and I basically started to vibrate. I just looked at it and said, 'I'm doing that.' I just was so turned on." The university games-room manager, a retired snooker referee from England, organized a league and taught her the game. She reflected that the element of safety shots in his games against her helped her develop her own safety play before she entered competitions. She met professional player Cliff Thorburn through a exhibition appearances he made at the university. In 1978, Thorburn encouraged her to enter a women's snooker tournament through which she could qualify for the Canadian championship. She later travelled to a pool hall in nearby Kitchener to practise, sometimes playing for eight hours a day.

=== Early playing career ===
In November 1978, McConnell won the Toronto women's snooker championship at Rocky's Billiards in Scarborough, defeating Rhonda Jackman 3–1 in the final. Her victory qualified her to represent the Toronto district at the Canadian championships in Ottawa the following February.

McConnell reached the quarter-finals of the women's world championship in 1980, defeating Sian Newbury 3–2 before losing 1–3 to the eventual champion Lesley McIlrath. At the 1981 Canadian Women's Open Championship, she defeated Kathy Saylors 3–1 and Sue LeMaich 3–0 before losing 4–1 to Natalie Stelmach in the final. At the time, she had no sponsorship and worked part-time as a waitress to finance her playing. In March 1981 she did not expect to attend that year's world championship because of financial constraints. However, she competed in May and lost 3–0 to Vera Selby in the quarter-finals.

McConnell was runner-up in the Canadian women's snooker championship in 1979 and 1981. The World Women's Snooker Championship was not held in 1982; McConnell reached the quarter-finals again in 1983. In 1983, she won the Canadian women's title, and, on the World Ladies' Billiards and Snooker Association circuit, was runner-up to Stacey Hillyard at the 1983 Walton Ladies Open.

In 1984, she was runner-up in the final standings for the 1984 Women's Grand Prix series, which is now regarded as an edition of the World Women's Snooker Championship. There were five tournaments in the series, and McConnell reached two finals, losing both of them to Mandy Fisher. In the final standings, Fisher was top with 64 points, ahead of McConnell on 44 and then LeMaich on 41. Reporting on the announcement of the tournament, the snooker journalist and historian Clive Everton described it as "by far the costliest and most ambitious venture the women's game has seen."

During the early 1980s, McConnell spent three and a half years in Saudi Arabia. While living there, McConnell resided in Khamis Mushait, where her husband Jack Wills worked for the Saudia airline. She had a snooker table shipped to the country and assembled it herself. Her husband's role for the airline enabled her to travel cheaply to tournament locations. In 1985, McConnell and Wills moved to Parry Sound, Ontario, where they spent two years building a boat. They then spent a year sailing through the Great Lakes to Nova Scotia. After three years away from cue sports, she resumed playing in Halifax in 1989. Ian Morrison, editor of The Hamlyn Encyclopedia of Snooker (1987) likened her playing style to that of Thorburn, as a "grinder".

=== After her break from competition ===
McConnell entered the world championship in 1989 and 1990; she reached the last-32 in 1989 and the last=16 the following year. In 1991, she took part in the 1991 World Masters, losing in her first matches in both the women's singles, and the women's doubles (with J. Page). In the mixed doubles she partnered Alain Robidoux to wins over Neal Foulds and J. Page, and over seeded Terry Griffiths and Fisher, before losing to James Wattana and S. Smith.

She won the Canadian Women's Open Snooker Championship again in 1992, when she was living on Cortes Island and practicing in an unheated barn. She beat Sherri Richardson 4–2 in the semi-final, and Rhonda Jackman in the final to win the Canadian Women's Championship, retaining the title that she had won at the previous staging in 1983. In an interview that year, she said that she had struggled with the prospect of winning at another player's expense and had adopted an approach that concentrated on the table rather than her opponent; she was being coached by Tony LeMay. She reached the last-32 at the world championships in 1994 and 1995. She won another snooker title in 1997. She also won the Canadian women's nine-ball pool championship that year, after two years of practicing the game.

She finished fourth in snooker at the 2003 Canadian championships. In September, she won a West Coast Women's Billiard Tour nine-ball event at Alberni Valley Billiards, defeating Regene Springett in the final. She finished seventh in nine-ball at that year's Canadian championships. In 2004, she was runner-up in both the snooker and nine-ball events at the Canadian championships.

In February 2013, McConnell won her seventh British Columbia women's eight-ball championship in Penticton. She also won the Scotch doubles title and was part of the winning women's eight-ball team. At the 2013 Canadian pool championships in Toronto, she won the women's eight-ball event, finished second in nine-ball, third in Scotch doubles eight-ball, and was a winner in the women's team events in eight-ball and nine-ball.

McConnell returned to World Women's Snooker competition, after a 28-year absence from the circuit, at the 2023 US Open in Seattle. In the group stage, she defeated both Kaarin Lysen and Diana Schuler 3–0 but lost to Rebecca Kenna by the same margin. She qualified for the quarter finals and was beaten 0–3 by Jamie Hunter. She reached the last-32 of the 2024 British Women's Open, where Emma Parker defeated her 3–1. McConnell did not progress from her qualifying group at the 2024 US Women's Snooker Open, but she was runner-up to Tessa Davidson in the seniors competition at the event, and won the Challenge Cup, beating Kaarin Lysen 2–1.

In July 2025, McConnell won a Northwest Women's Pool Association ten-ball tournament in Boise, Idaho, going undefeated and beating Melyssa Chasteen 9–4 in the final. She finished second in the Association's 2025 season standings and received its Player of the Year award, which recognizes sportsmanship, commitment to the game and mentoring.

McConnell and her late husband Robin Woodward owned Alberni Valley Billiards in Port Alberni. In 2010, McConnell estimated that she had coached or mentored about 100 high-school-aged players during the twelve years that she and Woodward had owned the club. As of 2005, she was secretary of the Canadian Billiards and Snooker Association. Woodward died in 2013. McConnell achieved a highest world ranking of second in women's snooker.

== Titles and achievements ==
Notes. Dashes are where information is not available. For Canadian Cue Sport (CCS) events, letters in parentheses identify the playing division: A is Advanced, B is Open, and C is Standard.

=== Snooker ===
Snooker titles and runner-up finishes
Outcome	No.	Year	Tournament	Opponent	Score	Ref.
Winner	1.	1978	Toronto women's championship	Rhonda Jackman	3–1	
Runner-up	1.	1979	Canadian women's championship	—	—	
Runner-up	2.	1981	Canadian women's championship	Natalie Stelmach	1–4	
Winner	2.	1983	Canadian women's championship	—	—	
Runner-up	3.	1983	Walton Ladies Open	Stacey Hillyard	0–3	
Runner-up	4.	1984	Women's Grand Prix (second leg, Armley Sports & Leisure Centre)	Mandy Fisher	2–7	
Runner-up	5.	1984	Women's Grand Prix (fifth leg, Strathallan Hotel, Birmingham)	Mandy Fisher	6–7	
Runner-up	6.	1984	Women's Grand Prix (professional world championship)	Mandy Fisher (series winner)	Series standings	
Winner	3.	1992	Canadian women's championship	Rhonda Jackman	—	
Winner	4.	1997	Canadian women's championship	Lynne Martin	—	
Runner-up	7.	1998	Canadian women's championship	Maureen Seto	—	
Runner-up	8.	1999	Canadian women's championship	Maureen Seto	1–4	
Runner-up	9.	2000	Canadian women's championship	Anita Kuczma	—	
Runner-up	10.	2001	Canadian women's championship	Anita Kuczma	—	
Runner-up	11.	2002	Canadian women's championship	Anita Kuczma	—	
Runner-up	12.	2004	Canadian women's championship	Anita Kuczma	—	
Runner-up	13.	2005	Canadian women's championship	Anita McMahon	—	
Winner	5.	2024	US Women's Snooker Open (Challenge Cup)	Kaarin Lysen	2–1	
Runner-up	14.	2024	US Women's Snooker Open (seniors)	Tessa Davidson	0–2	

=== Nine-ball ===
Nine-ball titles and runner-up finishes
Outcome	No.	Year	Tournament	Opponent	Ref.
Winner	1.	1997	Canadian women's championship	—	
Winner	2.	2003	West Coast Women's Billiard Tour (Port Alberni)	Regene Springett	
Runner-up	1.	2004	Canadian women's championship	—	
Runner-up	2.	2010	CCS Canadian women's championship	Naomi Williams	
Winner	3.	2011	CCS Canadian women's championship	Denise Belanger	
Runner-up	3.	2013	CCS Canadian women's championship	Kayla Jones	
Winner	4.	2016	CCS Canadian women's championship	Suzanne Peters	
Winner	5.	2023	CCS Canadian women's championship	Kathleen Zaguirre	

=== Eight-ball ===
Eight-ball titles and runner-up finishes
Outcome	No.	Year	Tournament	Opponent	Ref.
Winner	1.	2004	BCA national championship (women's senior singles)	Barbara Hamilton	
Winner	2.	2006	CCS British Columbia women's championship (A)	Candis Penalung	
Runner-up	1.	2006	CCS Western Canadian women's championship (A)	Andrea Wilson	
Winner	3.	2007	CCS British Columbia women's championship (A)	Andrea Wilson	
Runner-up	2.	2007	CCS Western Canadian women's championship (A)	Andrea Wilson	
Winner	4.	2008	CCS British Columbia women's championship (A)	Andrea Wilson	
Winner	5.	2009	CCS Western Canadian women's championship (A)	Andrea Wilson	
Winner	6.	2010	CCS Canadian women's championship (A)	Denise Belanger	
Winner	7.	2010	CCS British Columbia women's championship (A/B)	Andrea Wilson	
Winner	8.	2011	CCS British Columbia women's championship (A)	Mary Rayner	
Winner	9.	2011	CCS Western Canadian women's championship (A)	Mary Rayner	
Winner	10.	2012	CCS British Columbia women's championship (A)	Mary Rayner	
Winner	11.	2013	CCS Canadian women's championship (A)	Kayla Jones	
Winner	12.	2013	CCS British Columbia women's championship (A)	Jessica Wade	
Winner	13.	2013	CCS Western Canadian women's championship (A)	Andrea Wilson	
Runner-up	3.	2016	CCS Canadian women's championship (A)	Andrea Wilson	
Runner-up	4.	2016	CCS British Columbia women's championship (A)	Kathie MacDonald	
Runner-up	5.	2016	CCS Western Canadian women's championship (A)	Toni Sakamoto	
Winner	14.	2017	CCS British Columbia women's championship (A)	Jessica Wade	
Winner	15.	2017	CCS Western Canadian women's championship (A)	Ninon Smith	
Winner	16.	2018	CCS British Columbia women's championship (A)	Jenny Lucas	
Winner	17.	2020	CCS British Columbia women's championship (A)	Regene Lane	
Winner	18.	2023	CCS British Columbia women's championship (A)	Yvette Gallant	
Runner-up	6.	2026	CCS British Columbia women's championship (A/B)	Barb Francis	

=== Scotch doubles ===
Scotch doubles titles and runner-up finishes
Outcome	No.	Year	Tournament	Partner	Opponents	Ref.
Runner-up	1.	2012	CCS Canadian championship (A)	Wayne Dwyer	Jim Nolander and Denise Belanger	
Runner-up	2.	2015	CCS Canadian championship (A)	Wayne Dwyer	Bob Leonard and Yvette Gallant	
Winner	1.	2016	CCS Canadian championship (A)	Wayne Dwyer	Ted Harms and Yvette Gallant	

=== Ten-ball ===
Ten-ball titles
Outcome	No.	Year	Tournament	Opponent	Ref.
Winner	1.	2025	Northwest Women's Pool Association (Boise)	Melyssa Chasteen	
