= 1984 Women's Grand Prix (snooker) =

Women's snooker series, held 1984

Tournament information
- Dates: 13 February – 2 June 1984
- Country: England
- Organisation: World Ladies Billiards and Snooker Association / Ladies Snooker International
- Total prize fund: £60,000
- Winner's share: £14,000

Final
- Champion: Mandy Fisher (ENG)

The 1984 Women's Grand Prix was a women's snooker competition that took place in five venues from 13 February to 2 June 1984, organised by the World Ladies Billiards and Snooker Association and Ladies Snooker International, and sponsored by National Express. The format was for sixteen players to take part in a knockout tournament at each of the venues. The first of the stages, at Abertillery, was televised by HTV. The results from all five events were compiled to produce an overall winner. For each knockout event, the winning player was awarded 15 points, the runner-up 12 points, third placed 10 points, fourth: 8 points, fifth: 6 points, sixth: 5 points, seventh: 2 points and eighth: 1 point. Mandy Fisher, who won two of the events and was runner-up in two others, was the overall champion, and received £5,000 in addition to her prize money from each event. She also compiled a new highest break by a woman in competition, compiling a 62 in her match against Grace Nakamura at Basingstoke. The later events attracted only small audiences, and the competition was not repeated.

The event is regarded as an edition of the World Women's Snooker Championship.

== Prize money ==
- Overall winner "snowball" prize: £5,000

For each event:

- Winner: £2,500
- Runner-up: £1,500
- Semi-finals: £750
- Quarter-finals: £500
- First round: £250
- Highest break: £500

== Finals ==
The winning players are shown in bold.

| Player | Score | Player |
|---|---|---|
Abertillery Sports Centre, 13–18 February 1984
| **Sue Foster (ENG)** | **6**–1 | Georgina Aplin (ENG) |
In Leeds, 9–12 March 1984
| **Mandy Fisher (ENG)** | **7**–2 | Maryann McConnell (CAN) |
Beechdown Squash and Badminton Centre, Basingstoke, 9–14 April 1984
| **Sue LeMaich (CAN)** | **7**–5 | Mandy Fisher (ENG) |
Werrington Sports Centre, Peterborough
| **Sue LeMaich (CAN)** | **7**–5 | Mandy Fisher (ENG) |
Strathallan Hotel, Birmingham, 28 May-2 June 1984
| **Mandy Fisher (ENG)** | **7**–6 | Maryann McConnell (CAN) |
