= Sue LeMaich =

Canadian snooker player)

Personal information
- Born: Canada

Sport
- Country: Canada
- Sport: Snooker

Sue LeMaich is a Canadian snooker player. She was runner-up in the 1986 World Women's Snooker Championship.

== Biography ==
In both 1980 and 1981, LeMaich was beaten by Lesley McIlrath at the last 16 stage of the World Women's Snooker Championship. At the 1983 Championship, she beat L. Coleman 3–1, Jennifer Poulter 4–0, and Allison Fisher 5–1 in the knockout stages, before losing 5–6 to Maureen Baynton in the semi-final. Baynton had led 3-0 before LeMaitch levelled at 3-3. Baynton took the next frame, then LeMaitch won the two after that to lead 5–4. Baynton then won the concluding two frames, to win the match.

She was third in the 1984 National Express Grand Prix ladies snooker series. LeMaich won two of the five tournaments, those held in Basingstoke and Peterborough, beating eventual series winner Mandy Fisher in both finals. In the 1986 World Ladies Snooker Championship, LeMaich beat Agnes Davies 3–1 in the last 16, then Stacey Hillyard 4–3 in the quarter-final, and Kim Shaw 4–3 in the semi-final. In the final, she lost 0–5 to defending champion Allison Fisher.

LeMaich won a number of Canadian snooker titles, and also sometimes played in Nine-ball pool tournaments sometimes, before a back problem forced her to retire at the age of 31, in about 1988.

As of 1999, she was credited with being the woman player with the most century breaks, 12, with a top break of 128.

== Titles and achievements ==
Snooker

- 1986 Professional World Women's Snooker Championship runner-up.
- 1984 National Express Ladies Grand Prix – third place
