= Kelly Fisher =

English snooker and pool player

Kelly Fisher MBE
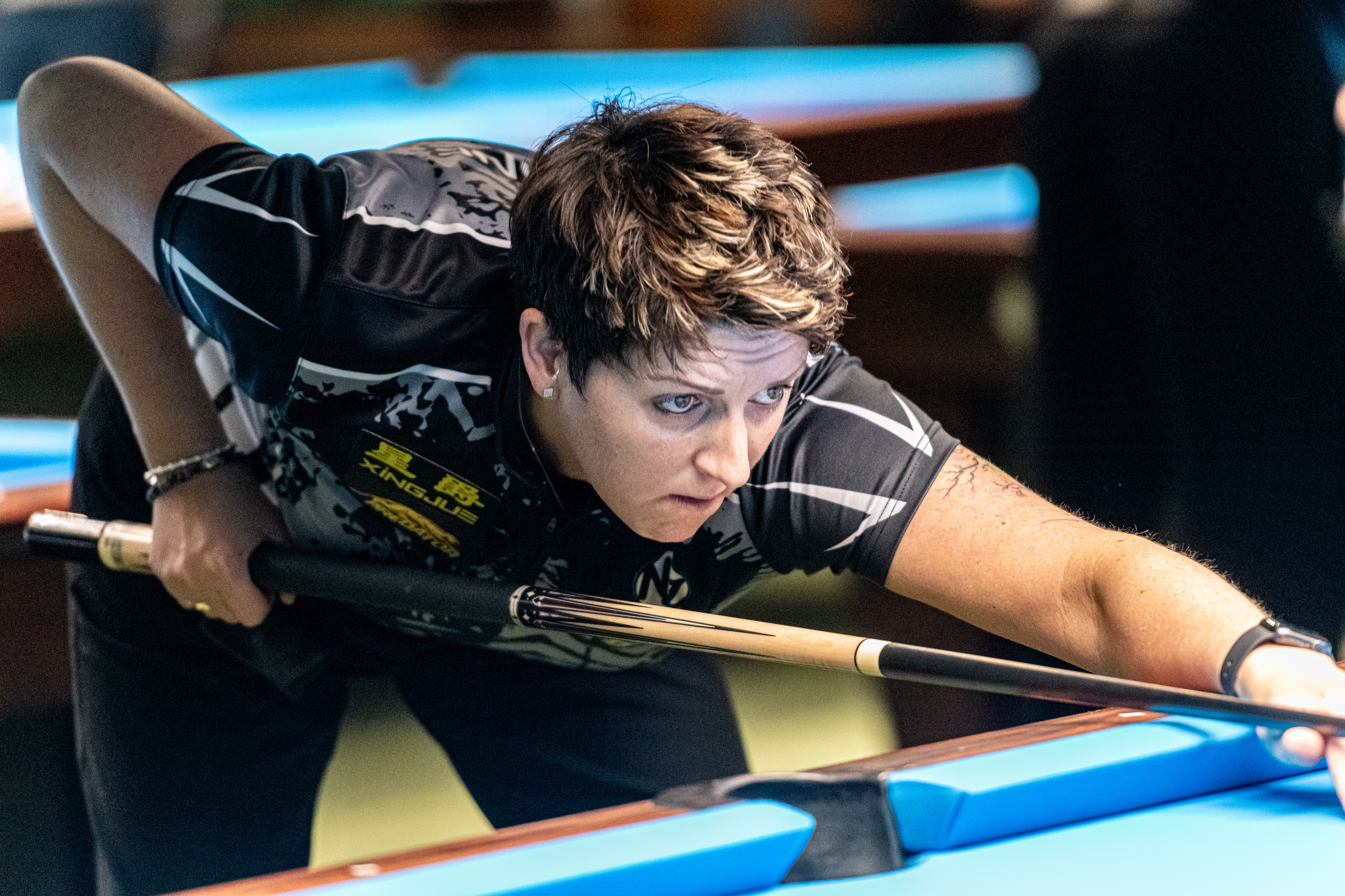

Personal information
- Nickname: KwikFire
- Born: 25 August 1978 (age 48) South Elmsall, England

Sport
- Country: England
- Sport: Snooker
- Professional: 2005

Tournament wins
- World Championship: Snooker: 1998; 1999; 2000; 2002; 2003; Billiards: 2001; 2003; Ten-ball: 2011; Nine-ball: 2012; 2019

Medal record

Women's nine-ball

Representing Great Britain

World Games
Gold medal – first place	2022 Birmingham	Singles
Bronze medal – third place	2013 Cali	Singles

Kelly Teresa Fisher (born 25 August 1978) is an English professional snooker, pool and billiards player. She has won world championships in all three disciplines.

== Career ==
Fisher grew up in South Elmsall, near Pontefract, West Yorkshire. She learned to play pool in her parents' pub and took up snooker when she was 13. By the age of 21, she had been ranked No. 1 for two consecutive seasons.

Fisher won three successive Ladies World Snooker Championship between 1998 and 2000, and won the title again in 2002 and 2003.

In 2001, she won four successive tournaments in the ladies' divisions – the British Open, Belgian Open, LG Cup titles and the UK Championship, and extended her winning streak to ten successive tournaments when she won the LG Cup in October 2002.

In all, she won 45 ranking titles between 1991 and 2003. From 2001 to 2003 she won fifteen consecutive tournaments in a 69-match winning streak. Her break of 125 at the 2003 World Women's Snooker Championship was a record at the event until surpassed in 2023. She was the first woman to make a century break in the qualifying stages of the World Snooker Championship, a 106 against Ryan Day in 2002.

In 2003 Fisher won the first IBSF World Ladies' Championship.

When the sport's governing body withdrew its support for the women's game in 2003, abandoning all major women tournaments, Fisher saw her choices as getting a full-time job or switching to nine-ball pool. She chose to switch to pool and moved to the United States to play on the Women's Professional Billiard Association (WPBA Tour), joining Allison Fisher and Karen Corr.

After being in the top 10 women players for two years, and winning the San Diego Classic for three years running (2005–2007), Fisher achieved the No. 1 ranking in world women's pool in August 2008, winning the US Open Championship. Since then, she has gone on to win the women's divisions in the 2009 International Tournament of Champions and U.S. Open 9-Ball Championship; the 2011 World Ten-ball Championship; 2012 WPA Women's World Nine-ball Championship (and WPA Player of the Year), among other titles.

As of 2024, Fisher trained the Hong Kong National Team.

Fisher was appointed Member of the Order of the British Empire (MBE) in the 2024 New Year Honours for services to sport.

== Tournament wins ==
All are first-place wins, in women's divisions, unless otherwise noted.

=== Snooker ===
Outcome	No.	Year	Championship	Opponent	Score	Ref.
Winner	1	1993	WLBSA Connie Gough Memorial	Tessa Davidson	3–1	
Winner	2	1994	WLBSA Connie Gough Memorial	Karen Corr	4–2	
Winner	3	1994	WLBSA James Brooks Classic	Tessa Davidson	3–2	
Winner	4	1995	WLBSA Academy Fork Lift	Karen Corr	4–0	
Winner	5	1995	WLBSA Halsteads Ladies Classic	Karen Corr	3–0	
Winner	6	1995	WLBSA M-Tech Ladies Classic	June Banks	4–0	
Winner	7	1996	WLBSA Bailey Homes	June Banks	4–2	
Winner	8	1996	WLBSA Ladies Regal Scottish	Lynette Horsburgh	4–1	
Winner	9	1996	WLBSA Ladies Regal Welsh	Ann-Marie Farren	4–1	
Winner	10	1996	WLBSA Applecentre Classic			
Winner	11	1996	EBSA European Snooker Championship	Karen Corr	6–3	
Winner	12	1997	WLBSA James Brooks Classic	Karen Corr	3–1	
Winner	13	1997	WLBSA Applecentre Classic	Lisa Quick	4–2	
Winner	14	1997	EBSA European Snooker Championship	Kim Shaw	5–3	
Runner-up	15	1997	Women's World Snooker Championship	Karen Corr	3–6	
Winner	16	1998	WLBSA Ladies Regal Scottish	Tessa Davidson	4–3	
Winner	17	1998	WLBSA Grand Prix (Ladies)	Lisa Quick	4–0	
Runner-up	18	1998	EBSA European Snooker Championship	Karen Corr	2–5	
Winner	19	1998	Women's World Snooker Championship	Karen Corr	5–0	
Winner	20	1999	WLBSA Ladies Regal Scottish	Julie Gillespie	4–0	
Winner	21	1999	WLBSA Connie Gough Memorial	Tessa Davidson	3–1	
Winner	22	1999	WLBSA Ladies British Open	June Banks	4–2	
Winner	23	1999	WLBSA Ladies UK Championship	Emma Bonney	4–0	
Winner	24	1999	WLBSA National Championship	Julie Gillespie	4–1	
Winner	25	1999	EBSA European Snooker Championship	Wendy Jans	5–2	
Winner	26	1999	Women's World Snooker Championship	Karen Corr	4–2	
Winner	27	2000	WLBSA Ladies UK Championship	Katie Henrick	4–0	
Winner	28	2000	WLBSA Ladies British Open	June Banks	3–0	
Winner	29	2000	WLBSA Connie Gough National	Kim Shaw	4–1	
Winner	30	2000	WLBSA Consultex Belgium Open	Lynette Horsburgh	4–0	
Winner	31	2000	WLBSA Ladies Regal Masters	Lynette Horsburgh	4–0	
Winner	32	2000	EBSA European Snooker Championship	Wendy Jans	5–0	
Winner	33	2000	Women's World Snooker Championship	Lisa Ingall	4–1	
Winner	34	2001	WLBSA Ladies British Open	Maria Catalano	4–0	
Winner	35	2001	WLBSA Ladies UK Championship	Lynette Horsburgh	4–1	
Winner	36	2001	WLBSA Connie Gough National	Lynette Horsburgh	4–1	
Winner	37	2001	WLBSA European Ranking Event	Lynette Horsburgh	4–0	
Winner	38	2001	WLBSA LG Cup (Ladies)	Lisa Quick	4–1	
Winner	39	2001	EBSA European Snooker Championship	Wendy Jans	5–3	
Winner	40	2002	WLBSA Ladies Regal Scottish	Lynette Horsburgh	4–2	
Winner	41	2002	WLBSA Ladies Regal Welsh	Wendy Jans	4–0	
Winner	42	2002	WLBSA Ladies British Open	Sharon Dickson	4–3	
Winner	43	2002	WLBSA Ladies UK Championship	Wendy Jans	4–1	
Winner	44	2002	WLBSA Connie Gough National	June Banks	4–2	
Winner	45	2002	WLBSA European Ranking Event	Lynette Horsburgh	4–2	
Winner	46	2002	WLBSA LG Cup (Ladies)	Lynette Horsburgh	4–2	
Winner	47	2002	WLBSA Scottish Ladies Championship	Sharon Dickson	4–3	
Winner	48	2002	EBSA European Snooker Championship	Wendy Jans	5–0	
Winner	49	2002	Women's World Snooker Championship	Lisa Quick	4–1	
Winner	50	2003	WLBSA Ladies Regal Welsh	Lynette Horsburgh	4–1	
Winner	51	2003	WLBSA Connie Gough National	Emma Bonney	4–0	
Winner	52	2003	EBSA European Snooker Championship	Wendy Jans	5–4	
Winner	53	2003	IBSF World Snooker Championship	Wendy Jans	5–2	
Winner	54	2003	Women's World Snooker Championship	Lisa Quick	4–1	
Winner	55	2012	WLBSA China Billiard & Snooker Association Championship			

- Home Internationals (with team England) 2002 and 2003

=== English billiards ===
Outcome	No.	Year	Championship	Opponent	Score	Ref.
Runner-up	1	1999	World Ladies Billiards Championship	Karen Corr	276–354	
Winner	2	2001	World Ladies Billiards Championship	Emma Bonney	290–219	
Runner-up	3	2002	World Ladies Billiards Championship	Emma Bonney	196–227	
Winner	4	2003	World Ladies Billiards Championship	Emma Bonney	299–155	

=== Pool ===
Year	Tournament	Ref
2004	US Amateur National Championship	
2005	WPBA West Coast Classic	
2005	WPBA San Diego Classic	
2005	WPBA Pacific Coast Classic	
2006	WPBA San Diego Classic	
2006	WPBA Pacific Coast Classic	
2007	WPBA San Diego Classic	
2007	WPBA Pacific Coast Classic	
2008	WPBA Pacific Coast Classic	
2008	WPBA Midwest Classic	
2008	WPBA U.S. Open 9-Ball Championship	
2009	Tournament of Champions	
2009	WPBA Pacific Coast Classic	
2010	Super Billiards Expo Players Championship	
2011	WPA Women's World Ten-ball Championship	
2012	WPA Women's World Nine-ball Championship	
2012	China Open 9-Ball Championship	
2013	Tournament of Champions	
2013	WPA Amway Cup 9-Ball Open	
2014	Tournament of Champions	
2016	Tornado Open Women's Open	
2017	European Pool Championship 9-Ball	
2017	CBSA International Open	
2018	European Pool Championship 9-Ball	
2018	Asian Culture Day Women's 10-Ball	
2019	WPBA Aramith / Dr Pool Classic	
2019	WPA Women's World Nine-ball Championship	
2021	Women's Poison VG 9-Ball Championship	
2021	WPBA Sondheim Kiwanis Invitational	
2021	Predator Austria Open 10-Ball	
2021	American Straight Pool Championship	
2022	WPBA Northern Lights Classic	
2022	WPBA Ashton Twins Classic	
2022	WPBA Predator Event	
2022	Super Billiards Expo Players Championship	
2022	Predator Germany Open 10-Ball	
2022	World Games Nine-ball Singles	
2022	Predator Michigan Open 10-Ball	
2022	WPBA Sledgehammer Open	
2023	WPBA Fairfield Invitational	
2023	WPBA Iron City Invitational	
2023	Predator Michigan Open 10-Ball	
2023	WPBA Iron City Invitational	
2023	Predator Puerto Rico Open 10-Ball	
2024	The Americas Heyball Championship	
2024	Borderline Brunswick Invitational	
2024	Predator Las Vegas Open Mixed Doubles - with (Alexander Kazakis)	

- Billiards Digest Player of the Year 2008, 2012, 2013
- Billiards Digest Player of the Decade 2010–2020
- AZBilliards Player of the Year 2019, 2021, 2022, 2023
- 2021 Billiard Congress of America Hall of Fame
- 2022 Member of the Order of the British Empire (MBE)
