= Tessa Davidson =

English snooker player

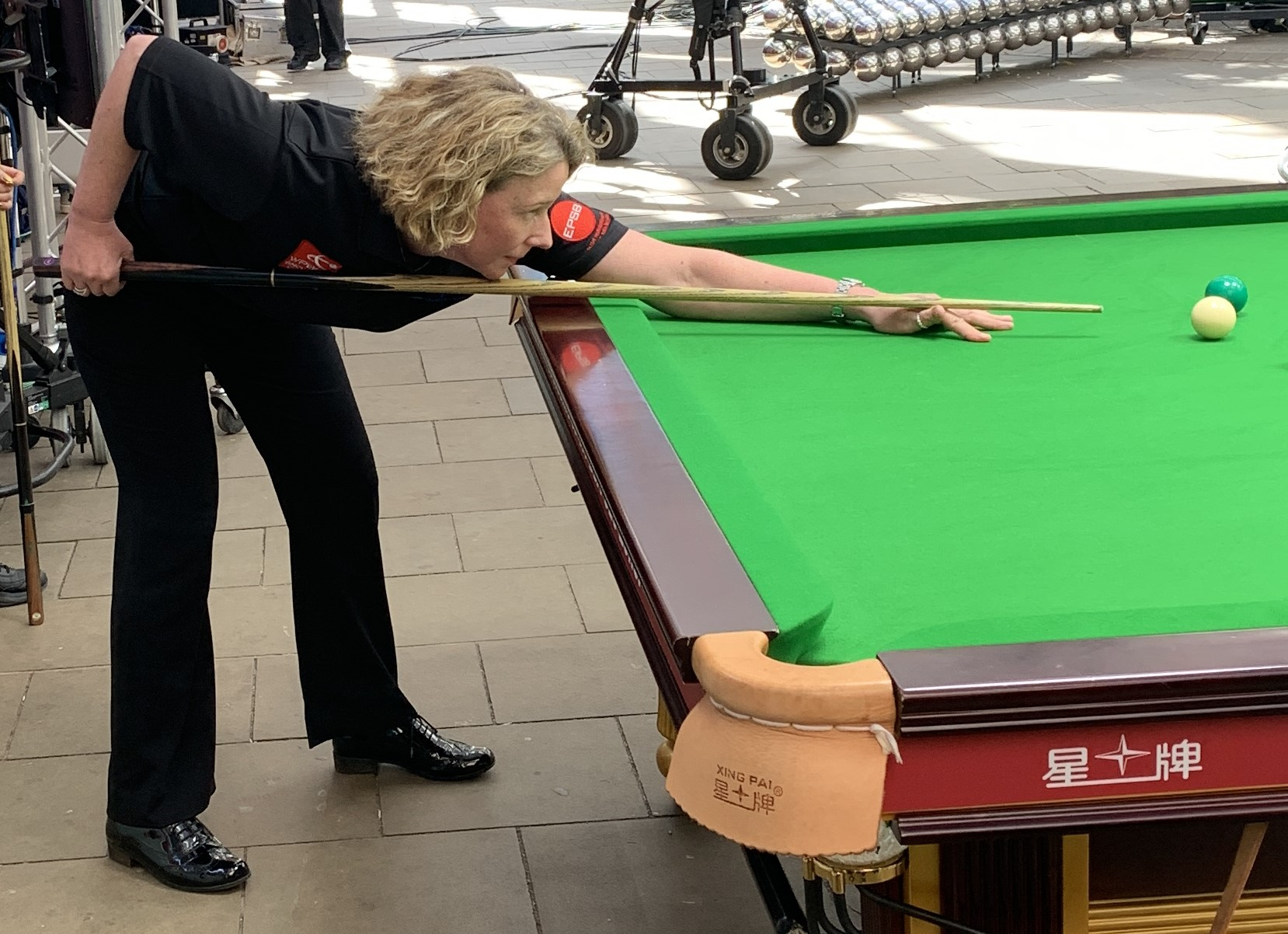

Personal information
- Born: 22 April 1969 (age 57)

Sport
- Country: England
- Sport: Snooker
- Professional: 1992–93 season
- Highest ranking: World Women's Snooker: 4

Tessa Davidson (born 22 April 1969) is an English snooker player from Banbury, Oxfordshire. She competed on the women's tour from 1988 to 1995 and again from 1998 to 1999, during which time she won three UK Women's Championships (1989, 1992 and 1998) and achieved a highest ranking of fourth in the women's world rankings. She competed on the main professional tour during the 1992–93 snooker season.

After 1999, Davidson took a 23-year hiatus from competitive snooker to raise her two children. She returned to the sport in 2022, competing on the women's tour and the women's seniors tour. Since her return, she has won a number of women's seniors titles, including the World Women's Seniors Championship in 2022, 2024, and 2025. As of April 2025, she was ranked ninth in the women's world rankings, as well as first in the women's seniors rankings.

== Biography ==
Born on 22 April 1969, Tessa Davidson is from Banbury, Oxfordshire. Her father was a snooker coach and taught Davidson and her sister the game when they were aged about 13. In the late 1980s, he managed a snooker club in London and his daughters would stay with him and play there.

She started competing on the women's snooker circuit in 1988. She gained her first points on the women's world ranking list in April that year after defeating Mandy Fisher. In 1989, she won the UK Women's Championship with a 4–1 victory against Stacey Hillyard in the final. Snooker Scene magazine described her as a "surprise winner", and in the Benson and Hedges Snooker Year, Gaye Jones called the result the "undoubted sensation" of the women's snooker season. Davidson had defeated 1987 world champion Ann-Marie Farren both in the round-robin and quarter-final stages, and her break of 84, made during her 4–1 defeat of Kim Shaw in the semi-finals, was the highest of the tournament. After winning the women's UK Championship, she decided to focus on snooker and played full-time for most of her 20s. Her next significant success was winning the 1990 Western Ladies Championship, when she overcame reigning world champion Karen Corr 3–2 in the semi-finals and world number one Hillyard 3–0 in the final. In 1991, she won the Pontins Ladies' Bowl.

Davidson faced Corr in the semi-finals of the 1991 Women's World Snooker Championship, where she was whitewashed 0–5; Corr won the first frame with a fluked pot on the black ball, the second frame on a re-spotted black, and the fourth with a fluked blue ball. Later in 1991, Davidson made a break of 135 at the British Women's Open, then the highest achieved on the women's tour.

She joined the World Professional Billiards and Snooker Association (WPBSA) in 1992 when membership was opened up to anyone who paid the relevant fee, and she competed on the professional circuit for the 1992–93 season. She won her first professional match 5–1 against Russ Schister in the qualifying competition for the 1992 UK Championship, but a 5–4 defeat of Gary Skipworth in the 1993 British Open qualifying was her only other win as a professional. She resigned her WPBSA membership at the end of the season, one of 76 players to leave the professional tour around that time. On the women's circuit, she won the 1992 UK Women's Championship on the last pink ball of the deciding frame against Hillyard.

After an absence from competitive snooker from 1995 to 1998, the unseeded Davidson defeated world number five Lisa Quick and reigning world champion Corr on her way to the final of the 1998 Connie Gough Memorial tournament, where she defeated second-ranked Kelly Fisher 3–1. She also reached the final of the 1998 Regal Welsh Open. She went on to win the 1998 UK Women's Championship, prevailing 4–1 in the final against Kelly Fisher despite losing the first frame. In the semi-finals, Davidson won her match when Corr went in-off the final black in the deciding frame. At this time, outside snooker, Davidson was operating a mobile fish and chip shop with her husband. She was runner-up in three tournaments in 1999, including the British Women's Open, which she lost to Lynette Horsburgh on the final blue ball of the deciding frame.

After taking a 23-year break from competitive snooker to raise her children, Davidson returned to the tournament circuit during the 2021–22 snooker season and became a successful competitor on the women's seniors tour (for players over 40). Since then, her tournament wins have included the 2022 UK Women's Seniors Championship, the Eden Women's Seniors Masters in 2022 and 2023, the Belgian Women's Seniors Open in 2023 and 2024, and the World Women's Seniors Championship in 2022, 2024, and 2025. She won the 2022 title after losing only one frame in four matches, and the 2024 championship after losing only one frame in three matches.

She competed in the 2024 World Seniors Championship at the Crucible Theatre, becoming the second woman, after Maria Catalano in 2022, to take part in the main event of the World Seniors Championship. Her opponent, Igor Figueiredo, won the opening frame, but Davidson took the second, becoming the first woman to win a frame at that stage of the tournament. Figueiredo secured a 3‍–‍1 victory and went on to win the tournament. Davidson won four of the eight events in the 2023/24 Winchester Women's Open Series. In the Grand Final for the top eight players in the series, she defeated 2022 women's world champion Mink Nutcharut 3–0 during the group stage. She faced Mink again in the final. After Mink had levelled at 1–1, Davidson took the next two frames to secure the title.

In 2022, she was awarded a coaching scholarship by the WPBSA. In 2023, she was working as a self-employed gardener and coaching at Fast Eddie's Pool and Snooker Hall. The Banbury Guardian named her as their Sports Personality of the Year for 2023. Her highest ranking on the women's circuit was fourth place which she held at the end of the 1992–93 and 1993–94 seasons. Although she has not reached the final of the World Women's Snooker Championship, she was a semi-finalist in 1991, when she was eliminated 0–5 by Corr, and in 1994 when she lost 3–6 to Allison Fisher. She gained the top place in the women's seniors rankings after the Winchester Women's Open in 2022. As of April 2025, she was ranked ninth in the women's world rankings, as well as first in the women's seniors rankings. She won the seniors event at the 2025 UK Women's Snooker Championship; it meant that of the 12 events that contributed to the seniors rankings, she had won all 11 that she had entered.

== Titles and achievements ==
Women's snooker finals contested by Tessa Davidson
Outcome	No.	Year	Championship	Opponent in the final	Score	Ref.
Winner	1	1989	UK Women's Championship	Stacey Hillyard (ENG)	4–1	
Runner-up	1	1989	Pontins Ladies' Bowl	Ann-Marie Farren (ENG)	0–3	
Runner-up	2	1989	Northern Ladies' Championship	Allison Fisher (ENG)	0–4	
Winner	2	1990	Western Ladies' Championship	Stacey Hillyard (ENG)	3–0	
Winner	3	1991	Pontins Ladies' Bowl	Ann-Marie Farren (ENG)	4–2	
Winner	4	1992	UK Women's Championship	Stacey Hillyard (ENG)	4–3	
Runner-up	3	1993	Saffron Classic	Karen Corr (NIR)	0–3	
Runner-up	4	1993	UK Women's Championship	Stacey Hillyard (ENG)	3–4	
Runner-up	5	1993	Connie Gough Memorial	Kelly Fisher (ENG)	1–3	
Runner-up	6	1994	James Brooke Classic	Kelly Fisher (ENG)	2–3	
Runner-up	7	1998	Regal Welsh Open	Karen Corr (NIR)	0–4	
Winner	5	1998	Connie Gough Memorial	Kelly Fisher (ENG)	3–1	
Runner-up	8	1998	Ladies Regal Scottish Masters	Kelly Fisher (ENG)	3–4	
Winner	6	1998	UK Women's Championship	Kelly Fisher (ENG)	4–1	
Runner-up	9	1999	Regal Welsh Open	Lisa Quick (ENG)	1–4	
Runner-up	10	1999	Connie Gough Memorial	Kelly Fisher (ENG)	1–3	
Runner-up	11	1999	British Women's Open	Lynette Horsburgh (SCO)	3–4	
Winner	7	2022	British Women's Open (Seniors)	Izabela Łącka (POL)	2–0	
Winner	8	2022	World Women's Seniors Championship	Ewelina Pislewska (POL)	3–0	
Winner	9	2022	Winchester Women's Open (Seniors)	Mary Talbot (ENG)	2–0	
Winner	10	2022	UK Women's Snooker Championship (Seniors)	Sarah Dunn (ENG)	2–0	
Runner-up	12	2022	Scottish Women's Open (Seniors)	Diana Schuler (GER)	1–2	
Winner	11	2022	Eden Women's Masters (Seniors)	Mary Talbot (ENG)	2–1	
Winner	12	2023	Belgian Women's Open (Seniors)	Mary Talbot (ENG)	2–0	
Runner-up	13	2023	British Women's Open (Seniors)	Mary Talbot (ENG)	1–2	
Runner-up	14	2023	2023/24 Winchester Women's Open Series – Event Two	Mink Nutcharut (THA)	2–3	
Runner-up	15	2023	UK Women's Snooker Championship (Seniors)	Mary Talbot (ENG)	0–2	
Runner-up	16	2023	2023/24 Winchester Women's Open Series – Event Three	Emma Parker (ENG)	2–3	
Winner	13	2023	2023/24 Winchester Women's Open Series – Event Four	Sarah Dunn (ENG)	3–1	
Winner	14	2023	Eden Women's Masters (Seniors)	Sarah Dunn (ENG)	2–0	
Winner	15	2023	2023/24 Winchester Women's Open Series – Event Five	Daisy May Oliver (ENG)	2–1	
Winner	16	2024	2023/24 Winchester Women's Open Series – Event Six	Emma Parker (ENG)	2–1	
Winner	17	2024	Belgian Women's Open (Seniors)	Mary Talbot (ENG)	3–0	
Winner	18	2024	2023/24 Winchester Women's Open Series – Event Seven	Jasmin Bolsover (ENG)	2–1	
Winner	19	2024	World Women's Snooker Championship (Seniors)	Han Fang (CHN)	3–1	
Winner	20	2024	2023/24 Winchester Women's Open Series – Grand Finals	Mink Nutcharut (THA)	3–1	
Runner-up	17	2024	English Women's Snooker Championship	Rebecca Kenna (ENG)	2–3	
Winner	21	2024	British Women's Open (Seniors)	Sarah Dunn (ENG)	2–0	
Winner	22	2024	US Women's Snooker Open (Seniors)	Maryann McConnell (CAN)	2–0	
Winner	23	2024	UK Women's Snooker Championship (Seniors)	Sarah Dunn (ENG)	2–0	
Winner	24	2025	British Women's Open (Seniors)	Deborah Fladgate (SCO)	2–0	
Winner	25	2025	UK Women's Snooker Championship (Seniors)	Charlene Chai (SIN)	2–0	

Team events
Outcome	No.	Year	Championship	Team/partner	Opponent in the final	Score	Ref.
Winner	1	1992	Home International Series	(England) Kim Shaw	Round-robin (Note: The tournament was played as a round-robin against teams from Northern Ireland, Scotland, Wales, Republic of Ireland and Isle of Man.)		
Winner	2	2024	EBSA Women's Team	(England) Rebecca Kenna	(Portugal) Vania Franco (Portugal) Sarah Rocha	3–2	
