= Caroline Walch =

English snooker player

Personal information
- Born: 17 June 1961 (age 65)

Sport
- Country: England
- Sport: Snooker

- Best ranking finish: World Women's Billiards Championship runner-up (2000)

Caroline Walch (born 17 June 1961) is an English snooker player. She has won titles on the World Ladies Billiards and Snooker circuit and was runner-up in the 2000 World Women's Billiards Championship.

== Career ==
Walch began her sporting career in 1983. In 1985, she won the Pontins (Brean Sands) Ladies tournament, was the losing finalist in the UK championship, and a semi-finalist in the world championship. She reached the world championship semi-finals again the following year.

At the 1991 Home Internationals tournament, Walch and Kim Shaw, representing England, won the women's competition. Walch won all her matches, and England finished top of the table ahead of Scotland on frame difference. The other teams participating were Northern Ireland, the Republic of Ireland, Wales and the Isle of Man.

Walch, paired with Jimmy White, reached the 1991 World Masters Mixed Doubles final, but they lost 3–6 to Steve Davis and Allison Fisher.

In 2000, Walch was runner-up in the World Women's Billiards Championship, losing the final 50–218 to Emma Bonney.

== Career highlights ==
Snooker

Outcome	No.	Year	Championship	Opponent	Score	Ref.
Semi-finalist	1	1984	Women's World Snooker Championship	Natalie Stelmach	0-4	
Runner-up	2	1985	Pontins Ladies' Bowl Champion			
Winner	3	1985	Brean Sands Ladies' Tournament			
Semi-finalist	4	1985	Women's World Snooker Championship	Stacey Hillyard	2-4	
Runner-up	5	1985	Tuborg Ladies UK Championship			
Runner-up	6	1986	Pontins Ladies' Bowl Champion			
Runner-up	7	1987	Pontins Ladies' Bowl Champion	Stacey Hillyard	1–3	
Runner-up	8	1987	East Anglian Ladies Championship			

Billiards

Outcome	No.	Year	Championship	Opponent	Score	Ref.
Runner-up	1	2000	World Women’s Billiards Championship	Emma Bonney	50–218	
