= Allison Fisher =

English snooker and pool player

Allison Fisher MBE
Personal information
- Nickname: The Duchess of Doom
- Born: 24 February 1968 (age 58) Cheshunt, England

Sport
- Country: United States
- Sport: Snooker
- Professional: 1985–1995 (snooker) 1995–present (pool)

Tournament wins
- World Championship: Snooker: 1985; 1986; 1988; 1989; 1991; 1993; 1994; Nine-ball: 1996; 1997; 1998; 2001
Medal record
Women's Nine-ball
Representing Great Britain then United States since January 2024
World Games
Gold medal – first place	2009 Kaohsiung	Individual

Allison Fisher (born 24 February 1968) is an English former professional snooker and pool player. She is widely regarded as the greatest female pool player of all time and one of the greatest female snooker players.

== Biography ==
Fisher was born on 24 February 1968 in Cheshunt and grew up in Tonbridge, Kent and lived later in Peacehaven, East Sussex. She started playing pool when she was 7. She won her first world title at the age of 17. To date, she has won over 80 national titles and 11 world titles in total. Throughout the 1980s, she made various attempts to qualify for the main Men's snooker tour, which contained around 128 players at the time, but these attempts were unsuccessful. However, by 1991, the tour had changed considerably meaning all players had to do to become a 'professional' on the main tour was pay an entry fee. This meant over 500 players played in qualifying rounds for the ranking tournaments. Fisher reached round 4 of the qualifying rounds of the 1994 World Championship where she was beaten by Roger Garrett 10–4. She was unable to progress into the higher reaches of the ranking lists and by 1997 she lost her professional status. Feeling that she did not receive the same respect as the male players, she moved to the United States to play on the WPBA Tour. On 18 March 2009, she endorsed the Delta-13 billiard rack and has her own signature series.

Fisher did not take long to make her mark in the world of pool, winning only the second tournament that she played in. She has an unequalled record, winning over 60 WPBA titles as of 2024, which includes 4 world 9-Ball championships. Since her move, she has also been the highest-earning player on a number of occasions, which takes into account male and female players. Matchroom sports invited her to play in the Matchroom snooker league, and she was also invited to play in the Mosconi Cup 1994, when Europe lost 16:12 against Team USA.

She was the top-ranked player on the Women's Professional Billiards Association (WPBA) circuit from September 1996 to June 2001, and again each year from 2002 to 2007.

In 2009, Fisher was inducted into the Billiard Congress of America Hall of Fame.

Fisher was nicknamed "the Duchess of Doom". In the 2005 season, Fisher was the highest earner, winning £111,000.

In 2007, she was declared the female Player of the Year by all three of the major pool publications, Billiards Digest, Pool & Billiard Magazine, and InsidePOOL Magazine (in each case with Shane Van Boening as her male co-recipient of the honor), and also ranked #1 in the P&B "Fans' Top 20 Favorite Players" poll for that year. She has been the BD female Player of the Year for 11 of the 12 years spanning 1996–2007, including 6 in a row, 2002–2007.

Fisher appeared as herself in the 2012 sports drama film 9-Ball, which focuses on professional nine-ball pool and features several real-life professional players, including Jennifer Barretta and Jeanette Lee. Fisher was appointed Member of the Order of the British Empire (MBE) in the 2022 New Year Honours for services to sport.

=== Citizenship and representation ===
Fisher began her playing career representing the United Kingdom. In 1995 she moved to the United States to pursue a professional career on the Women's Professional Billiard Association (WPBA) Tour. Fisher later acquired U.S. citizenship and has represented the United States in international pool competitions. Allison Fisher's change of sporting country representation from the United Kingdom to the United States was formally approved shortly before the Iron City Billiards Invitational III, which she won, (January 11–14, 2024 in Birmingham, Alabama), marking her first official tournament competing under the U.S. designation after the approval of her request to the WPA and the BCA.

=== Retirement ===
On 2 October 2026, it was reported on Sky Sports News that Allison Fisher was retiring from all cue sports owing to a recent Parkinsons disease diagnosis.

== Titles and achievements ==
=== Snooker ===
Outcome	No.	Year	Championship	Opponent	Score	Ref.
Winner	1	1985	Women's World Snooker Championship	Stacey Hillyard	5–1	
Winner	2	1986	Women's World Snooker Championship	Sue LeMaich	5–0	
Winner	3	1988	Women's World Snooker Championship	Ann-Marie Farren	6–1	
Winner	4	1989	Women's World Snooker Championship	Ann-Marie Farren	6–5	
Winner	5	1991	World Masters Women's Doubles with Stacey Hillyard	Karen Corr / Ann-Marie Farren	5–2	
Winner	6	1991	World Masters Mixed Doubles with Steve Davis	Jimmy White / Caroline Walch	6–3	
Winner	7	1991	World Mixed Doubles Championship with Steve Davis	Stephen Hendry / Stacey Hillyard	5–4	
Winner	8	1991	Haverhill Classic	Kelly Fisher	3–0	
Winner	9	1991	Women's World Snooker Championship	Karen Corr	8–2	
Winner	10	1993	Women's World Snooker Championship	Stacey Hillyard	9–3	
Winner	11	1994	Women's World Snooker Championship	Stacey Hillyard	9–3	
Winner	12	1994	Haverhill Classic	Kelly Fisher	3–0	
Winner	13	1994	Regal Masters	Kelly Fisher	4–0	
Winner	14	1994	Llanelli Classic	Stacey Hillyard	4–2	
Winner	15	1994	New Berkshire Classic	Kim Shaw	3–0	
Winner	16	1995	Bailey Homes Ladies Classic	Karen Corr	4–1	
Winner	17	1995	Regal Welsh	Kim Shaw	4–1	
Winner	18	1995	UK Ladies Championship	Karen Corr	4–1	

=== Pool ===
Year	Tournament
1995	WPBA National Championship
1995	WPBA Orlando Classic
1996	WPA World 9-Ball Championship
1996	WPBA Honolulu Classic
1996	WPBA Los Angeles Classic
1996	WPBA Nashville Classic
1996	McDermott Eastern States 9-Ball
1996	WPBA National Championship
1996	WPBA New York Classic
1996	WPBA Orlando Classic
1996	All Japan Championship
1997	ESPN Ultimate 9-Ball Challenge
1997	WPA World 9-Ball Championship
1997	WPBA Detroit Classic
1997	WPBA Los Angeles Classic
1997	WPBA New York Classic
1997	Super Billiards Expo Players Championship
1997	WPBA Phoenix Classic
1997	WPBA Twin Cities Classic
1998	WPBA Olhausen Classic
1998	Tournament of Champions
1998	WPA World 9-Ball Championship
1998	WPBA Bay Area Classic
1998	WPBA Dallas Classic
1998	WPBA Detroit Classic
1998	WPBA National Championship
1998	Super Billiards Expo Players Championship
1998	WPBA San Diego Classic
1998	WPBA Twin Cities Classic
1998	European Pool Championship 9-Ball
1998	European Pool Championship 14.1
1999	ESPN Ultimate 9-Ball Challenge
1999	ESPN Ultimate Champions Shootout
1999	WPBA Arizona Classic
1999	WPBA Detroit Classic
1999	BCA Open 9-Ball Championship
1999	WPBA National Championship
1999	Super Billiards Expo Players Championship
1999	WPBA U.S. Open 9-Ball Championship
2000	Viking Cue 9-Ball Tour
2000	Long Fong Cup
2000	Tournament of Champions
2000	UCC Tokyo Pro 9-Ball Tournament
2000	WPBA California Classic
2000	WPBA National Championship
2000	WPBA Villa Park 9-Ball Challenge
2000	WPBA Virtual Pool 9-Ball Challenge
2000	BCA U.S. Open Straight Pool Championship
2001	Amway Cup
2001	Tournament of Champions
2001	WPA World 9-Ball Championship
2002	Amway Cup
2002	Tournament of Champions
2002	WPBA Midwest Classic
2002	WPBA Fall Classic
2002	WPBA Players Championship
2003	WPBA Delta Classic
2003	WPBA Midwest Classic
2003	WPBA National 9-Ball Championship
2003	WPBA San Diego Classic
2004	WPBA Delta Classic
2004	WPBA Midwest Classic
2004	WPBA San Diego Classic
2004	Tournament of Champions
2005	Amway Cup
2005	WPBA BCA 9-Ball Championship
2005	WPBA Carolina Classic
2005	WPBA Great Lakes Classic
2005	WPBA Midwest Classic
2005	WPBA U.S. Open 9-Ball Championship
2006	WPBA National Championship
2005	WPBA U.S. Open 9-Ball Championship
2006	WPBA Great Lakes Classic
2007	WPBA U.S. Open 9-Ball Championship
2007	WPBA National Championship
2007	Florida Classic
2008	WPBA San Diego Classic
2008	WPBA Great Lakes Classic
2009	Super Billiards Expo Players Championship
2009	World Games Nine-ball Singles
2011	WPBA U.S. Open 9-Ball Championship
2011	Ultimate 10-Ball Championship
2011	Haining Cup 9-Ball
2012	WPBA U.S. Open 9-Ball Championship
2013	Super Billiards Expo Players Championship
2016	WPBA Masters 9-Ball Championship
2016	Tournament of Champions
2018	WPBA Ho-Chunk Classic
2018	Kantuo Open 10-Ball Championship
2018	NAPT Summer 10-Ball Classic
2020	WPBA Ashton Twins Classic
2021	Texas Open 9-Ball Championship
2021	Diamond Open Scotch Doubles Invitational
2021	Diamond Open 9-Ball
2024	WPBA Iron City Invitational
2024	WPBA Palmetto Billiards Invitational
2025	Jacksonville Mixed Doubles Open

- A record 60+ WPBA titles
- Billiards Digest Player of the Year 1996–2000, 2002-2007
- Billiards Digest Player of the Decade 1990–1999, 2000–2010
- 1999 Billiards Digest 9th Greatest Living Player of the Century
- 2007 Pool & Billiard Magazine Fans #1 Favorite Player
- 2009 Billiard Congress of America Hall of Fame
- 2016 WPBA Hall of Fame
- 2022 World Snooker Tour Hall of Fame
- 2022 Member of the Order of the British Empire (MBE).
- 2026 North Carolina Order of the Long Leaf Pine Award
- 2026 Best in Billiards- Best Female Player Award
