= Ann-Marie Farren =

English snooker player, born 1971

Personal information
- Born: 29 August 1971 (age 55) England

Sport
- Country: England
- Sport: Snooker
- Professional: 1991–1995 (WPBSA)
- Highest ranking: 344 (WPBSA)

Tournament wins
- World Championship: 1987

Ann-Marie Farren (born 29 August 1971) is an English former snooker player. She won the World Ladies Snooker Championship in 1987, at the age of 16, and was runner-up in 1988 and 1989.

== Biography ==
Farren started playing aged seven, on a 4 ft by 2 ft snooker table that her father Hugh bought her. She left Chilwell Comprehensive School with one O-level, having prioritized snooker above her studies, and went into snooker as a career. She prepared for the 1987 world championship by practicing on a £4,000 table her father installed for her in a specially built room in the garden.

56 players participated in the 1987 tournament. Farren progressed through to the final, where she played Stacey Hillyard. Farren achieved a 5–1 victory to take the prize of £3,500 and the trophy, plus a double magnum of champagne that she was not old enough to drink, being only 16 years and 48 days old at the time. She was the second-youngest champion, the youngest being her beaten opponent Hillyard, who had won at the age of 15 in 1984.

Farren was runner-up in the world championship in 1988 and 1989, losing both times to Allison Fisher, who was regarded as the dominant player of the era.

When the World Professional Billiards and Snooker Association opened membership for events to anyone over the age of 16 in 1990, Farren was one of six women to join, along with Allison Fisher, Stacey Hillyard, Georgina Aplin, Karen Corr, and Maureen McCarthy, whilst 443 men joined at the same time.

Farren once modelled waistcoats alongside 1985 World champion Dennis Taylor on The Clothes Show. She started a media studies course at Newark and Sherwood College in 1994, with ambitions to become a journalist, and later joined the UK civil service.

== Titles and achievements ==
Outcome	No.	Year	Championship	Opponent	Score	Ref.
Winner	1	1987	British Open	Lynette Horsburgh	3–0	
Winner	2	1987	Women's World Snooker Championship	Stacey Hillyard	5–1	
Runner-up	1	1988	Women's World Snooker Championship	Allison Fisher	1–6	
Winner	3	1988	Hellerman Deutsch Classic	Allison Fisher	3–2	
Runner-up	2	1989	Women's World Snooker Championship	Allison Fisher	5–6	
Runner-up	3	1991	Pontins Ladies' Bowl	Tessa Davidson	2–4	
Runner-up	4	1992	Regal Masters	Karen Corr	3–4	
Runner-up	5	1993	Regal Masters	Stacey Hillyard	3–4	
Winner	4	1994	Pontins British Open	Kim Shaw	4–3	
Runner-up	6	1995	Pontins British Open	Karen Corr	1–4	
Runner-up	7	1996	Regal Welsh	Karen Corr	1–4	
