= Karen Corr =

Northern Irish professional pool and snooker player

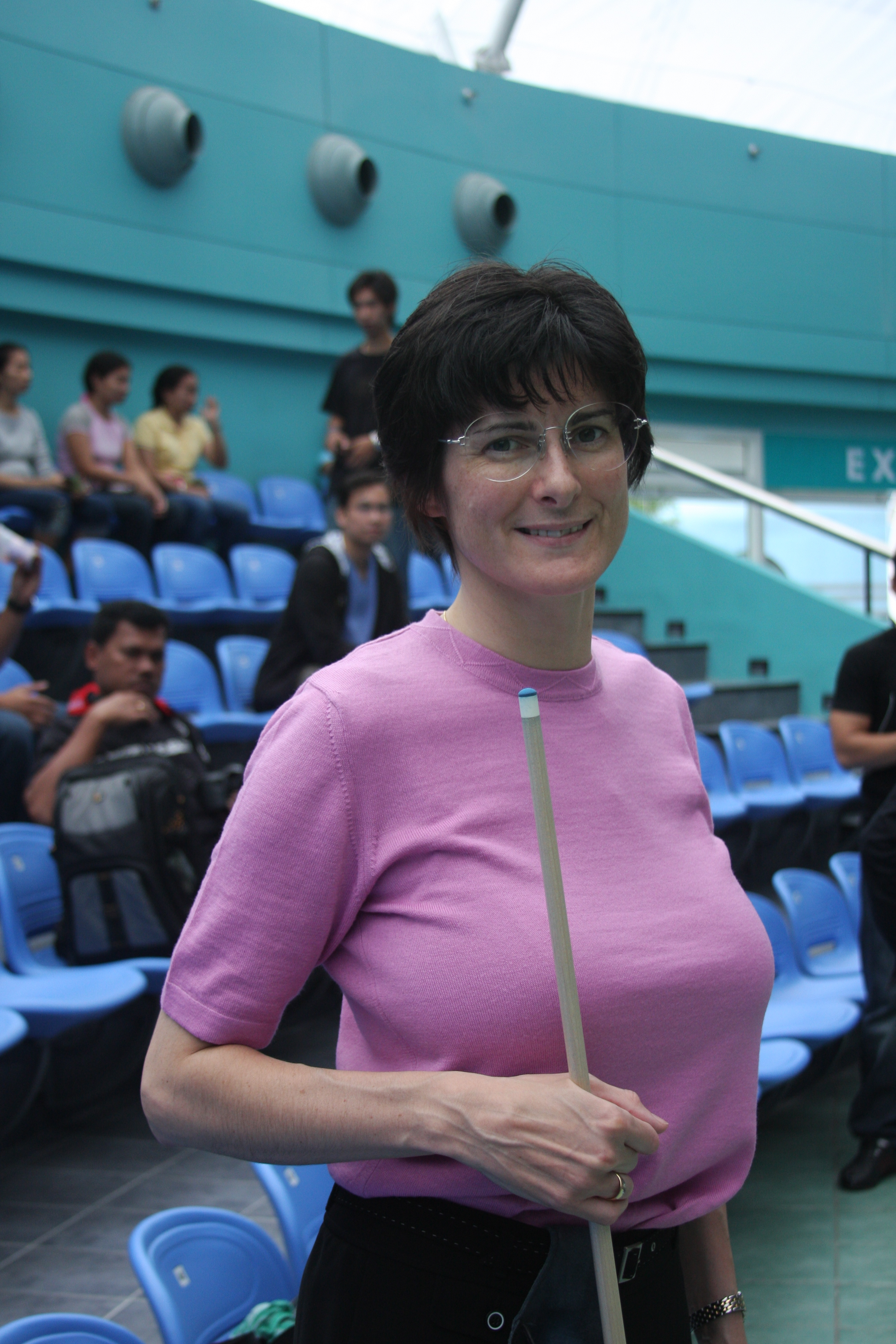
- Karen Corr (2009)

Personal information
- Nickname: The Irish Invader
- Born: 10 November 1969 (age 56) Ballymoney, Northern Ireland

Sport
- Country: Northern Ireland
- Sport: Snooker
- Professional: 1990

Tournament wins
- World Championship: Snooker: 1990; 1995; 1997; English Billiards: 1998; 1999
Medal record
Women's Nine-ball
Representing Great Britain
World Games
Silver medal – second place	2001 Akita	Individual

Karen Corr (born 10 November 1969) is a Northern Irish professional pool and former snooker and English billiards player. She began entering women's snooker tournaments at age 15 and went on to win the World Women's Snooker Championship three times and the World Women's Billiards Championship twice. In 1998, she moved to the United States to play pool professionally. She has won numerous tournaments and has been ranked number one on the WPBA Tour. She was inducted into the BCA Hall of Fame in 2012.

== Early life ==
Corr was born on 10 November 1969 in Ballymoney, Northern Ireland and spent her early childhood near Maghera. When she was 8 years old, her family moved to England. She loved watching snooker matches on television and joined a snooker club at the age of 14 with her father and her brother. Her friends in Bourne saw that she had exceptional snooker skills and encouraged her to play in tournaments.

== Snooker and pool career ==
At the age of 15, she entered her first tournament in Leicester. She continued to play in tournaments and rapidly became a top player on the women's tour. On the day after her 21st birthday, Corr won her first Women's World Snooker Championship. She would go on to repeat that feat in 1995 and 1997. She also won the World Women's Billiards Championship in 1998 and 1999.

A recession in the mid-1990s and increased restrictions on tobacco sponsorship caused prize funds to rapidly decrease for snooker events outside the World Championship. This forced Corr to look elsewhere for profitable tournament play. Fellow snooker player Julie Kelly told her about the WPBA Tour in America. Corr moved to the U.S. in 1998 to see how well she could play pool. After winning ten consecutive qualifying events, she was able to compete in the professional WPBA events.

By the end of 1998, Corr was ranked #24. At the end of 1999, she was ranked # 4. By the end of 2000, she was ranked 2nd in the world.

Corr won her first WPBA Classic Tour title, "The 2000 Cuetec Cues Players Championship" in Valley Forge, Pennsylvania. She completed that year with two more Classic tour titles. She also won the "All Japan Championship" held in Osaka, Japan. She placed second in the "WPA Women's World Championship" and in the "UCC World Ladies Championship" held in Tokyo, Japan.

In 2001, she became the first person to win every WPBA Classic tour event in the same season since they began. She won the silver medal at the World Games and placed 2nd at the World Championships. Before 2001 ended, Corr found herself at the top, the No. 1 ranked player in the World and remained there for 2 years.

Since then, she has been a leading player in women's pool. The crowning achievement of her career came on 26 October 2012, when Corr was formally inducted into the Greatest Player wing of the BCA Hall of Fame. Her Hall of Fame induction announcement stated "her quick rise to the top and her consistent dominance on American soil has earned her the only spot in this year's BCA Hall of Fame class."

She has been runner-up at the World 9-ball Championship four times.

== Titles and achievements ==
=== Snooker ===
Outcome	No.	Year	Championship	Opponent	Score	Ref.
Winner	1	1990	Women's World Snooker Championship	Stacey Hillyard	7–4	
Runner-up	2	1991	Women's World Snooker Championship	Allison Fisher	2–8	
Winner	3	1994	WLBSA Halstead Ladies Classic	Allison Fisher	3–2	
Winner	4	1994	WLBSA Pontins Spring Bowl	Lisa Quick	4–1	
Winner	5	1995	Women's World Snooker Championship	Kim Shaw	6–3	
Winner	6	1995	WLBSA Pontins British Ladies	Ann-Marie Farren	4–1	
Winner	7	1995	WLBSA West Norwood Open	Kelly Fisher	3–1	
Winner	8	1996	WLBSA Academy Fork Lift	Kelly Fisher	4–2	
Winner	9	1996	WLBSA Connie Gough Memorial	Kim Shaw	3–2	
Winner	10	1996	WLBSA James Brooks Classic	Kelly Fisher	3–0	
Winner	11	1997	Women's World Snooker Championship	Kelly Fisher	6–3	
Winner	12	1997	WLBSA Barratts Club National	Kelly Fisher	3–2	
Winner	13	1997	WLBSA Ladies National	Kelly Fisher	4–2	
Winner	14	1997	WLBSA UK Championship	Lynette Horsburgh	4–3	
Winner	15	1997	WLBSA Pontins UK Championship			
Winner	16	1997	WLBSA Scottish Masters	Kelly Fisher	4–2	
Runner-up	17	1998	Women's World Snooker Championship	Kelly Fisher	0–5	
Runner-up	18	1999	Women's World Snooker Championship	Kelly Fisher	2–4	

=== English billiards ===
Outcome	No.	Year	Championship	Opponent	Score	Ref.
Winner	1	1998	World Ladies Billiards Championship	Emma Bonney	403–219	
Winner	2	1999	World Ladies Billiards Championship	Kelly Fisher	354–276	

=== Pool ===
Year	Tournament	Venue
1999	New York State 9-Ball Championship	Binghamton, NY
2000	All Japan Championship 9-Ball	Osaka, JAP
2000	Super Billiards Expo Players Championship	Valley Forge, PA
2000	Northeast 9-Ball Tour	Portland, ME
2000	WPBA Baltimore Classic	Baltimore, MD
2000	WPBA Affinix Software Los Angeles Open	Los Angeles, CA
2001	Super Billiards Expo Players Championship	Valley Forge, PA
2001	WPBA Spring Classic	Alpine, CA
2001	WPBA Charlotte Classic	Charlotte, NC
2001	WPBA Fall Classic	Albuquerque, NM
2001	WPBA Midwest Classic	Villa Park, IL
2001	WPBA National Championship	Lincoln City, OR
2002	WPBA Spring Classic	Alpine, CA
2002	BCA Open 9-Ball Championship	Las Vegas, NV
2002	WPBA National Championship	Miami, FL
2003	Super Billiards Expo Players Championship	Valley Forge, PA
2003	BCA Open 9-Ball Championship	Las Vegas, NV
2003	WPBA U.S. Open 9-Ball Championship	Albuquerque, NM
2003	WPBA Canadian Open	Windsor, Ontario
2004	BCA Open 9-Ball Championship	Las Vegas, NV
2004	WPBA National Championship	Lincoln City, OR
2005	WPBA Southeast Classic	Hollywood, FL
2006	Tournament of Champions	Uncasville, CT
2006	WPBA Carolina Classic	Rocky Mount, NC
2006	WPBA Florida Classic	Hollywood, FL
2006	WPBA Midwest Classic	Peoria, IL
2007	Tournament of Champions	Uncasville, CT
2007	WPBA Midwest Classic	Norman, OK
2007	BCA Open 9-Ball Championship	Las Vegas, NV
2008	Tournament of Champions	Uncasville, CT
2014	Super Billiards Expo Players Championship	Edison, NJ
2016	Super Billiards Expo Players Championship	Oaks, PA
2016	NAPT Inaugural 10-Ball Invitational	Herndon, Va
2017	WPBA U.S. Open 9-Ball Championship	Pittsburgh, PA
2017	NAPT Summer 10-Ball Classic	Grayslake, IL
2017	NAPT Freedom Classic	Dickson City, Pa
2017	Desert Shootout	Las Vegas, Ne
2018	Super Billiards Expo Players Championship	Oaks, PA
2018	Coupe du Quebec Pro Event	Quebec, CAN
2019	Coupe du Quebec Pro Event	Quebec, CAN

- 2001 Billiards Digest Player of the Year
- 2012 Billiard Congress of America Hall of Fame
