= Stacey Hillyard =

English snooker player

Personal information
- Born: 5 September 1969 (age 57) England

Sport
- Country: England
- Sport: Snooker
- Professional: 1991–1995
- Highest ranking: 1 (Women's); 276 (WPBSA)

Stacey Hillyard (born 5 September 1969) is an English former professional snooker player, who won the 1984 amateur World Women's Snooker Championship at the age of 15, making her the youngest winner of the tournament. She reached the final of the competition on five further occasions.

== Biography ==
Stacey Hillyard started playing snooker on a full size table at the YMCA club in Winton, aged 12. She played her first competitive women's snooker event in 1982, and lost on the final black ball to the reigning world champion Sue Foster. The next year, she reached the last-16 round of the Pontins Women's Open, by defeating world number five Mandy Fisher, who had reached the 1981 world final.

Hillyard won the 1984 Amateur World Women's Snooker Championship aged 15 and while still a student at Highcliffe Comprehensive School, defeating Canadian player Natalie Stelmach 4–1 in the final. Although Hillyard reached the final five more times, she did not win the event again. Three of the finals were lost to Allison Fisher, the dominant player of the era.

In 1985 in Bournemouth, Hillyard, still 15, became the first woman to compile a century break (114) in a competitive snooker match. It was the first ever century by any player in the league, and stood as the highest break in the league until 1995.

When the World Professional Billiards and Snooker Association (WPBSA) opened membership for events to anyone over the age of 16 in 1990, Hillyard was one of six women to join, along with Allison Fisher, Ann-Marie Farren, Georgina Aplin, Karen Corr, and Maureen McCarthy, whilst 443 men joined at the same time. At the 1991 Dubai Classic, Hillyard started in the second qualifying round, and defeated Dermot McGlinchey, Paul Hefford, Chris Carpenter, to progress to the 5th round, in which she lost 1–5 to Alex Higgins. Her last year on the WPBSA circuit was the 1994–95 snooker season, concluding with a 0–5 loss to Andrew Duff in the first qualifying round for the 1995 British Open.

On 23 February 1992, Hillyard recorded a new highest break in competitive women's snooker, making 137 during the General Portfolio Women's Classic held in Aylesbury.

Hillyard stopped playing competitive snooker by the mid-1990s and worked for Marks and Spencer, and later as a police officer. She qualified as a chartered accountant in 2003 and, as of 2025, she advises clients on compliance with tax regulations.

== Career finals ==
Legend
World Championship (1–5)
Other (3–7)

| Outcome | No. | Year | Championship | Opponent in the final | Score | Ref. |
|---|---|---|---|---|---|---|
| Winner | | 1983 | 1983 Walton Ladies Open | Maryann McConnell (ENG) | 3–0 | |
| Winner | | 1984 | World Women's World Snooker Championship (Amateur) | Natalie Stelmach (CAN) | 4–1 | |
| Runner-up | | 1985 | World Women's World Snooker Championship | Allison Fisher (ENG) | 1–5 | |
| Runner-up | | 1987 | World Women's World Snooker Championship | Ann-Marie Farren (ENG) | 1–5 | |
| Runner-up | | 1990 | World Women's World Snooker Championship | Karen Corr (NIR) | 4–7 | |
| Winner | | 1991 | Romford Classic | Allison Fisher (ENG) | 3–2 | |
| Runner-up | | 1991 | World Masters (Women's singles) | Karen Corr (NIR) | 2–6 | |
| Runner-up | | 1992 | Harlekin European Masters | Allison Fisher (ENG) | 5–6 | |
| Runner-up | | 1992 | Edwardian Classic | Allison Fisher (ENG) | 0–3 | |
| Runner-up | | 1992 | Saffron Classic | Allison Fisher (ENG) | 0–3 | |
| Runner-up | | 1993 | New Berkshire Classic | Allison Fisher (ENG) | 1–3 | |
| Winner | | 1993 | Pontins UK Championship | Tessa Davidson (ENG) | 4–3 | |
| Runner-up | | 1993 | World Women's World Snooker Championship | Allison Fisher (ENG) | 3–9 | |
| Winner | | 1993 | Regal Masters | Ann-Marie Farren (ENG) | 4–3 | |
| Runner-up | | 1994 | Pontins UK Championship | Karen Corr (NIR) | 3–4 | |
| Runner-up | | 1994 | World Women's World Snooker Championship | Allison Fisher (ENG) | 3–7 | |
| Runner-up | | 1994 | Llanelli Classic | Allison Fisher (ENG) | 2–4 | |

Doubles and team events

- 1991 World Masters Women's Doubles – winner (with Allison Fisher)
- 1991 World Mixed Doubles Final – Runner-up (with Stephen Hendry) – lost 4–5 to Allison Fisher and Steve Davis.
