= Lynette Horsburgh =

Scottish-English pool, snooker, and English billiards player

Personal information
- Born: 1974 (age 51–52)

Sport
- Country: Scotland
- Sport: Snooker
- Highest ranking: 1

Tournament wins
- World Championship: 2008 Women's WEPF World Eightball Pool Champion

Lynette Horsburgh (/ˈhɔːrzbʌrə/ HORZ-burr-ə; born 1974) is a Scottish-English semi-professional, world champion pool and national champion snooker player, as well as an international-class player of English billiards. In sport, she represents Scotland. Outside sport, she is a professional Web content producer and journalist at BBC News Online.

== Career ==
Horsburgh began playing snooker at age 8 on a home table, wearing roller skates to reach the table, playing in earnest since 11, and competing in weekend tournaments as a teenager. She says that playing at the Commonwealth Sporting Club in Blackpool in 1983 with her hero, world champion Steve Davis, is what inspired her. She lamented the snooker hall's demolition in 2009 (though it had been converted into a bowling alley in 1989) and the role the venue played for her in a sport dominated by men:

I was heartbroken when it closed. It was my idea of heaven. ... If it wasn't for the Commonwealth I probably would never have taken the game up because most local venues at the time didn't allow ladies to play on the tables.

=== Early years ===
Despite the loss of her preferred venue and the snooker celebrity crowd – an ideal training pool – that it had attracted during its dozen years, Horsburgh, at age 17, reached the quarterfinal in the 1991 World Masters, losing 4–5 to Stacey Hillyard of England, after beating Kim Shaw of England in the last 16, and Natalie Stelmach of Canada in the last 32.

=== 2001–2004 ===
Horsburgh made it to the final round of the 2001 Women's World Snooker Championship, losing 2–4 to Lisa Quick of England. Horsburgh rose to the no. 1 ranking in the 2003/2004 season on the WLBSA Ladies' World Snooker Tour. She fought to the semifinals of the 2003 WLBSA Ladies' World Snooker Championship, and the final match of the LG Cup, losing only to Kelly Fisher, who was on an unprecedented 48-match winning streak across 10 tournaments. Horsburgh lost 3–4, despite having early leads of 1–0 and 2–1.

Horsburgh began transitioning into pool in 2003 and made it her primary cue sports focus by March 2004. She was the runner-up in the EPA 2004 Ladies' International Pool Tour Event 2 early in the year, and relegated her snooker play to amateur leagues one night per week, rarely practising except before a tournament.

Nevertheless, at age 30, she won the Ladies' United Kingdom Snooker Championship in November 2004, taking the final in a close 4-frames-to-3 competition against England's Reanne Evans – a full-time player also competing in the open/men's circuit (and later a record-setting ten-time world champion, 2005–2014). Horsburgh had the highest break (consecutive run) of the event, of 82 points during her 4–1 semifinal victory against June Banks. She also scored breaks of 41 and 57 in her 4–1 quarterfinal win over Michelle Sherwin (Ireland national champion), and a break of 52 in the final (Evans managed a 68, but did not win the deciding frame). The UK victory ranked Horsburgh at no. 2 (after Kelly Fisher) in the WLBSA 2004/2005 season. Horsburgh said that she hadn't expected to win this and two national pool titles – WEPF Ladies' National Champion and English Pool Association (EPA) Champion of Champions – back-to-back over a few weeks, feeling her age and media career were disadvantages: "most of the top girls are full-time players and I am getting on a bit, while they seem to be getting younger." She did not compete in the November 2004 WLBSA Ladies' World Snooker Championship or the European Championship earlier that year due to non-sport work commitments.

=== 2005– ===
In 2005, Horsburgh won the WEPF Women's European Championship in eightball pool, in which she was ranked the women's no. 1 that year, and was also a member of the victorious European Team B (Scotland) in the World Ladies' Team Championship in the same discipline. She competed again in the WLBSA Ladies' World Snooker Championship, reaching the finals for a second time, losing to Reanne Evans, despite having bested her for the world title in 2004. Horsburgh was also the runner up in a third discipline – English billiards – defeated 136–243 by three-time Indian national champion Anuja Thakur. She also competed in the 2006 Ladies' World Championship in the singles and (with Natalie Madden) doubles divisions.

Horsburgh became, at age 34, the World Eightball Pool Federation (WEPF) 2008 Women's World Champion. in the discipline of eightball pool (also known as blackball, and not to be confused with eight-ball). She beat Barbara Taylor (then-current World Cup Champion and later captain of the England Ladies' team) in the televised final, 8–6, after initially trailing 0–2; both were first-time finalists. Horsburgh bested the defending and eight-time World Champion Sue Thompson (a fellow Anglo-Scot) in the semifinal. Women Sport Report quoted Thompson as saying: "[Horsburgh] was awesome. If I had to lose my title to anyone, it would be to Lynette." Ranked no. 3 at the time in women's eightball pool, Horsburgh won the event in her home town of Blackpool, Lancashire, making it a triple win for locals with a year, as Blackpool natives Paul McGuire and Daryl Peach respectively won the WEPF Juniors' World Championship (at the same event) and the WPA World Nine-ball Championship (in the Philippines, previous November).

She next won the EPA 2009 Ladies' International Pool Tour opening event in March, again defeating fellow Sue Thompson (7–5), after narrowly besting another former world champion, Emma Cunningham, 6–5. Horsburgh also entered some open events (i.e., competing against male as well as female pros), such as the 2009 Ireland's Invitation 8Ball Pool Pro-Am Classic, where she reached the last 32.

=== Additional player background ===
She represents Scotland as an international player, both in pool and snooker, and has competed in the Scottish Pool Association (SPA), the national World Pool-Billiard Association (WPA) blackball pool league, as well as WEPF eightball pool and snooker. By 2012, she was focusing on nine-ball, and competing – including against men in open divisions – as far away as the United States for tournaments, and across the UK as one of only three women in the GB Nine-ball Tour, the discipline's professional league in the UK. As of 2015, she had remained active in competitive snooker, too, in the form of pro-am tournaments in ten-red snooker, a fast-paced version of the game. Horsburgh has appeared on BBC One's snooker game show Big Break three times.

Horsburgh has a recorded high snooker break of 135, only 12 short of a maximum break. She has trained with snooker coaches Sedge McClelland and Stephen Rowlings in snooker, and with eightball-pool world champion Mick Hill as well as Pete Mercer. Like many players, she has various nicknames; hers include "the Ice Maiden" for her cool demeanor, as well as "Spinny", "Spinderella", and "Wee One" for her short stature of only 5 foot (1.5 m) even. This is unusual in the sport, in which reach is an advantage and lack of it requires development of skill with the rest (mechanical bridge stick). Horsburgh says she plays in high stiletto heels to compensate, though it causes foot discomfort. She shoots with the same custom-shortened Joe Davis 146 cue stick she has used since her days at the Commonwealth Sporting Club, and favoured three Blackpool snooker halls during their heyday: Potters, Great Harwood, and Rileys. Aside from Steve Davis, she cites Ronnie O'Sullivan as a favourite player. As of 2007, she was sponsored by ProMasters. In 2008, she began working as a personal pool and snooker coach, and an exhibition player (with Karl Boyes, Mick Hill, and Ian McCulloch).

== Personal life ==
Lynette Anne Horsburgh was born in Blackpool on 8 February 1974 to Scottish parents James ("Ossie") and Anne (née Regan) Horsburgh, and works in nearby Blackburn. Her family ties to Scotland have led her to consistently choose to represent Scotland in sport. Outside of sport, she works as a Web content developer and journalist for BBC News Online, and got her start in media as a cue sports reporter for the Blackpool Gazette, and Pot Black Magazine. She completed a degree in law and accountancy at the University of Central Lancashire in 1997. Horsburgh's partner Karl Boyes, is also world champion – winner of the 2008 WPA World Cup of Pool (one of the top professional male events in nine-ball) and the 2010 WPA World Eight-ball Championship; he is co-owner of Blackpool's remaining pool and snooker club, Qs Cue Sports Lounge.

== Titles ==
Snooker

Outcome	No.	Year	Championship	Opponent	Score	Ref.
Winner	1	1999	Ladies' Grand Prix			
Winner	2	1999	British Open Ladies' Championship			
Winner	3	2000	Regal Welsh Open Championship, Ladies' division			
Winner	4	2004	WLBSA Ladies' UK Championship			

Pool

Outcome	No.	Year	Championship	Opponent	Score	Ref.
Winner	1	2004	SPA Ladies' Singles Championship			
Winner	2	2004	WEPF Ladies' UK National Championship			
Runner-up	3	2004	EPA Ladies' Champion of Champions			
Winner	5	2005	WEPF World Team Champions, Scottish Ladies Team B captain			
Runner-up	6	2005	WEPF Women's European Championship			
Winner	7	2008	WEPF World Eightball Championship, Women's	Barbara Taylor	8-6	

English billiards

Outcome	No.	Year	Championship	Opponent	Score	Ref.
Runner-up	1	2005	World Women's Billiards Championship	Anuja Thakur	136–243	
