= Kim Shaw (snooker player) =

English snooker and pool player

Personal information
- Nickname: The Cooler
- Born: 9 July 1969 (age 57) England

Sport
- Country: England
- Sport: Snooker

Kim Shaw is an English snooker and pool player. She was runner-up in the 1995 World Women's Snooker Championship, and was the first player to compile a century break in a World Ladies Billiards and Snooker Association tournament.

== Biography ==
Shaw started playing snooker in 1984, at a snooker club in High Wycombe. In the late 1980s, Shaw combined her playing career with working at Rileys Snooker Club, on the Oxford Road, Reading, Berkshire She reached the semi-finals of the World Women's Snooker Championship in 1986, losing 3–4 to Sue LeMaich. Shaw reached the quarterfinals of the world championship in both 1991 and 1994, before her best showing, in the 1995 tournament, which was held in India.

Her 1995 world championship run saw her defeat Maryann McConnell, Lynette Horsburgh and Tessa Davidson on her way to the semi-final, where she beat Allison Fisher, who had won the championship on each of the last three occasions that it had been run, by 5 frames to 3. In the final, Shaw lost the first three frames to Karen Corr and end up losing 6–3. This proved to be her only world snooker championship final, although she did reach the semi-finals in both 1998 and 1999.

In the 1997 EBSA European Snooker Championship, Shaw was runner up, losing 3–5 to Kelly Fisher. She won the 2000 Grand Prix tournament, which included victories over reigning world champion Kelly Fisher 3–2 in the quarter-final, and Emma Bonney 4–1 in the final. At this time, her main source of income was working as a courier for DHL.

Shaw was runner up in the 2000 Connie Gough Memorial, to losing 1–4 to Kelly Fisher. More recently, Shaw has played pool competitively, winning a number of tournaments. She once appeared on the television programme Surprise Surprise, playing against Tony Meo.

== Titles and achievements ==
Snooker

- 1988 Billy Boy Foods Snooker Classic
- 1995 Regal Masters champion.
- 1997 EBSA European Snooker Championship runner-up
- 2000 Connie Gough Memorial – runner-up

Pool Main source: azbilliards.com (See External links below)

- 2001 WPBA Amateur National Champion
- 2001 LBAF Tour #6 Champion
- 2001 AWBT #5 Champion
- 2001 Pennsylvania State Ladies Nine-ball Championship runner-up
- 2002 JPNEWT #2 Champion
- 2002 JPNEWT 2002 #1 Champion
- 2002 JPNEW New Jersey Eight-ball Championship runner-up
- 2003 Women N.C. Nine-ball Championship Runner-up
- 2003 JPNEW NY Nine-ball Championship Runner-up
- 2003 Women Virginia State Championship Runner-up
- 2004 JPNEW Tour 2004 #1 Champion
- 2004 C.A.T. 2004 Stop 2 Runner-up
- 2005 Ladies Florida State Champion
- 2006 WPBA US Open Runner-up
- 2006 Ladies Spirit Tour #2 Runner-up
- 2009 MAL Tour Stop 2 Champion
- 2009 CAL Pechauer Tour #3 Champion
- 2009 Kwikfire Tour #2 Runner-up
- 2009 Kwikfire Tour #3 Runner-up
