= Mandy Fisher =

English snooker and billiards player (born 1962)

Personal information
- Born: April 1962 (age 64) England

Sport
- Country: England
- Sport: Snooker
- Best ranking finish: 1984 Women's Grand Prix (snooker)

Mandy Fisher (born in April 1962) is an English former professional snooker player and a World Women's Snooker Championship winner in 1984. (Note: The event was known as the World Professional Championship at the time.) Fisher founded the World Ladies Billiards and Snooker Association (now known as World Women's Snooker) in 1981 and currently serves as the president.

== Career ==
Fisher started playing snooker at the age of 16. She founded the World Ladies Billiards and Snooker Association (WLBSA) in 1981 and in addition to playing, led the administrative side of the sport in the 1980s and 1990s.

She was the losing finalist at the 1981 World Women's Snooker Championship. In 1983 she became the first woman to reach the last 128 of the English Amateur Championship. In 1984, she defeated Canadian Maryann McConnell 4–2 to win the first professional women's title. In 1984, the National Express sponsored a five-month, five-tournament grand prix circuit, with a £60,000 prize fund, and which was broadcast on regional television channels. Sixteen of the top-ranked women turned professional and competed in the series. Fisher eventually won, and her winnings of £14,000 in the season took her to twelfth place – just behind three-time men's world champion John Spencer – in the professional snooker money-winners' list for the year.

In the 1980s Fisher featured regularly on the snooker exhibition circuit, competing with players such as Steve Davis, Jimmy White and Alex Higgins.

Fisher played while heavily pregnant in the early 1990s, with a midwife on standby, and later lamented that this was deemed more newsworthy than women players demonstrating their skill. Barry Hearn, later the World Snooker chairman, forced Fisher to wear maternity clothing to mark this in front of media at London's Hyde Park.

In 2011, Fisher stepped down from the World Ladies Billiards and Snooker Association but took office again in 2013.

== Personal life ==
Fisher is also a podiatry professional, working in Wisbech, Cambridgeshire.

== Career highlights ==
Outcome	No.	Year	Championship	Opponent	Score	Ref.
Winner	1	1980	Pontins Women's Champion	Sian Newbury	3–2	
Runner-up	2	1981	Women's World Open	Vera Selby	0–3	
Winner	3	1984	National Express Grand Prix	round-robin		
