= Spring Vale, Isle of Wight =

Village on the Isle of Wight, England

Coordinates: 50.7244°N 1.1239°W

Spring Vale
- Hamlet
- Houses in the hamlet from Springvale Beach

- Location within the Isle of Wight
- OS grid reference: SZ6193492012
- Civil parish: Nettlestone and Seaview
- Unitary authority: Isle of Wight
- Ceremonial county: Isle of Wight
- Region: South East
- Country: England
- Sovereign state: United Kingdom
- Post town: SEAVIEW
- Postcode district: PO34
- Police: Hampshire and Isle of Wight
- Fire: Hampshire and Isle of Wight
- Ambulance: Isle of Wight

Spring Vale (also spelled Springvale) is a coastal hamlet in the civil parish of Nettlestone and Seaview, on the north coast of the Isle of Wight, England, near the Puckpool area of Ryde and 2 miles (3.2 km) east from the main area of Ryde. It is the location of Springvale Beach, stretching from Puckpool to Seaview.

Spring Vale hosts a pub and café and behind it is the Alan Hersey Nature Reserve, forming part of the Ryde Sands and Wootton Creek SSSI.

== Name ==
The name means 'the spring in a valley', referring to the valley in the Alan Hersey Nature Reserve. Woodlands Vale, a country house south of the village, near Pondwell, have a similar origin: the wooded valley.

== History ==
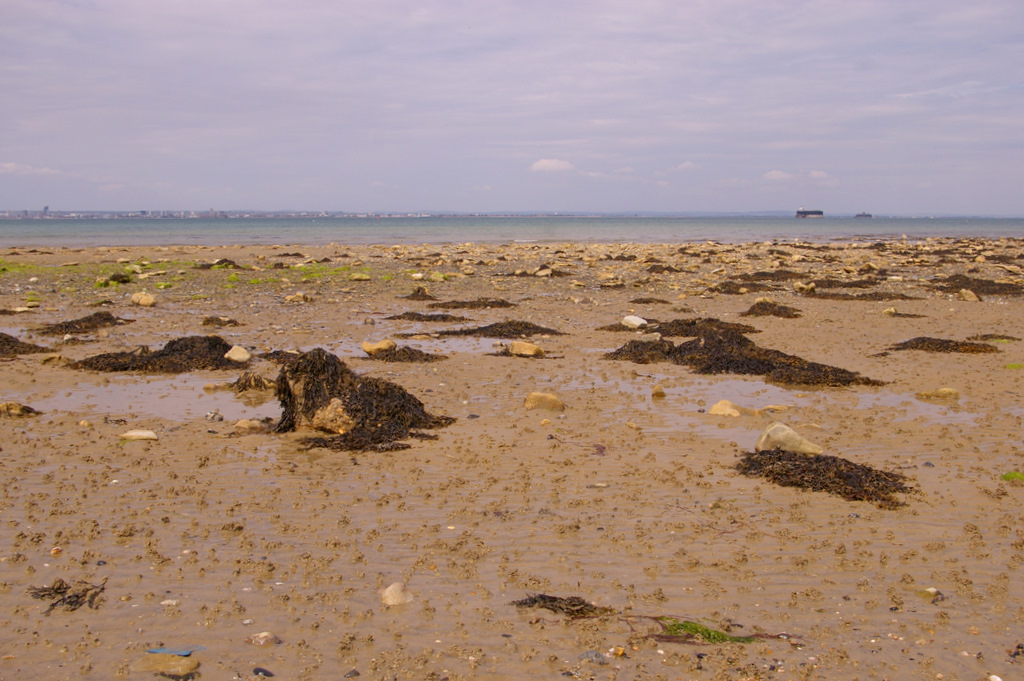
Springvale Beach

Roman coin hoards have been discovered and recorded on the beaches in Spring Vale. There may have been an emporium there, with a small hoard of 2nd century sesterii and dupondii being discovered.

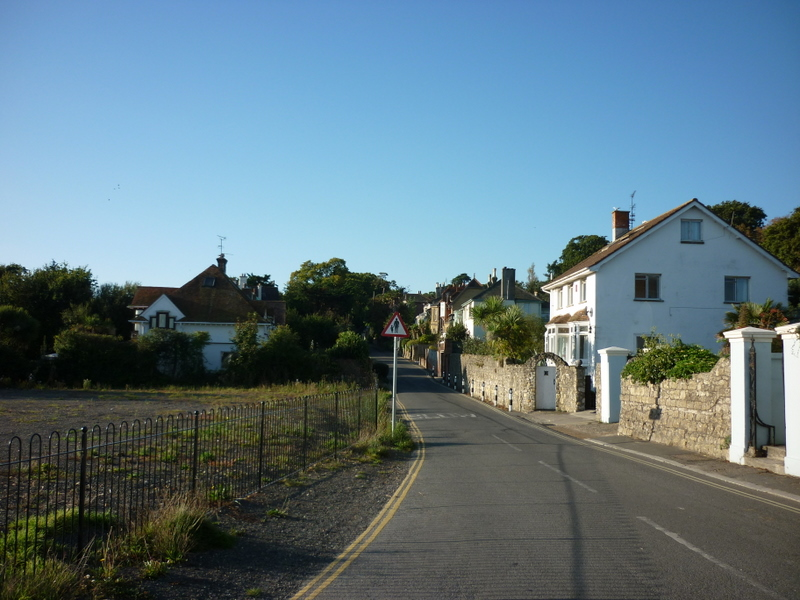
Oakhill Road, Spring Vale

The village was formerly in the vast medieval parish of Newchurch.

On 9 August 1940, a bomb was discovered near Woodlands Vale Cottage in Spring Vale, with people being evacuated later that day.

A Saxon v-shaped fishing weir was discovered on the beach during the July of 2008.

== Alan Hersey Nature Reserve ==
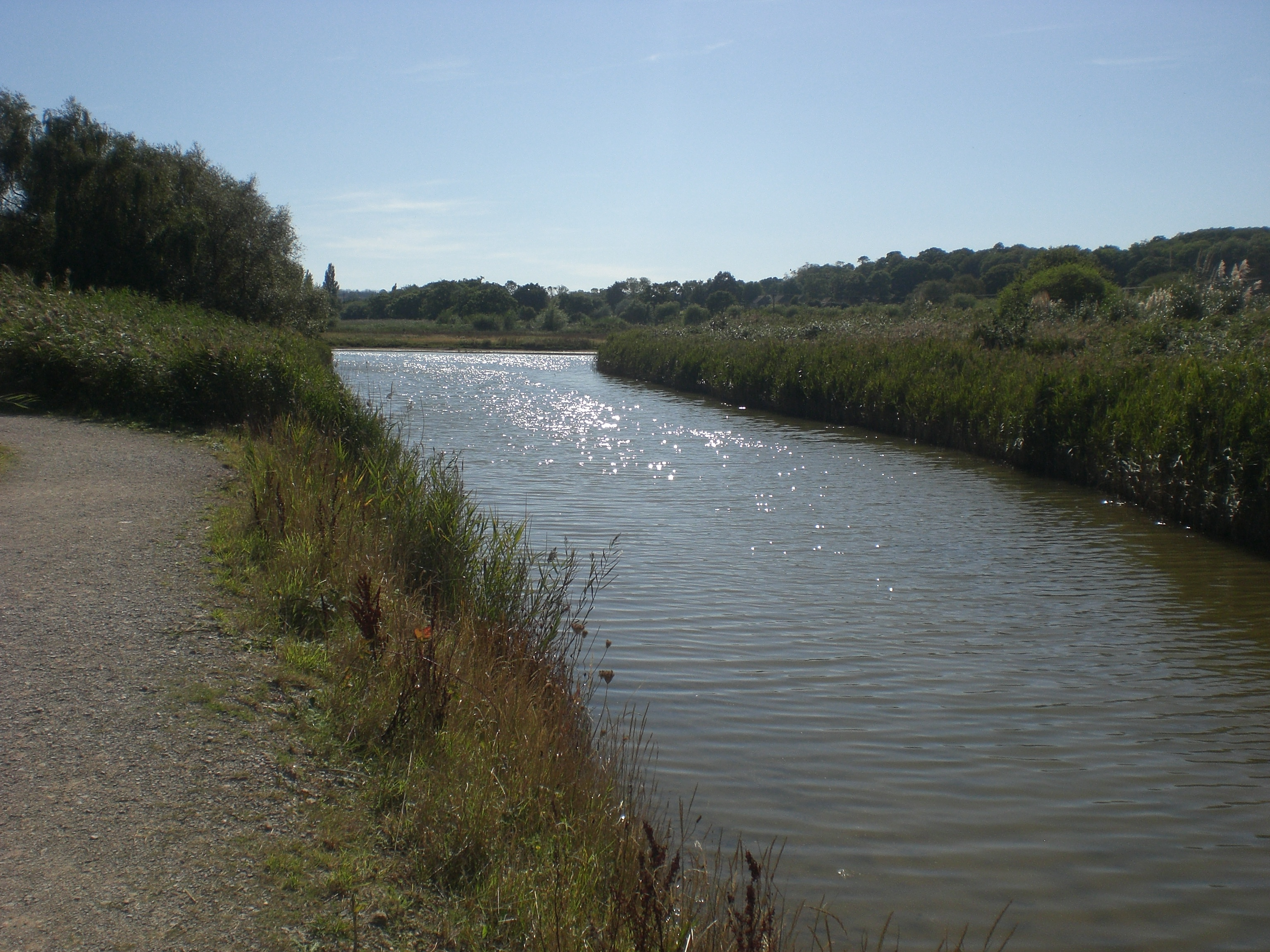
A body of water at the nature reserve

The Alan Hersey Nature Reserve is located to the south and the south east of the village, reaching to Seaview. The site is situated on a flood plain in a valley, with a lagoon, lakes and reedbeds.

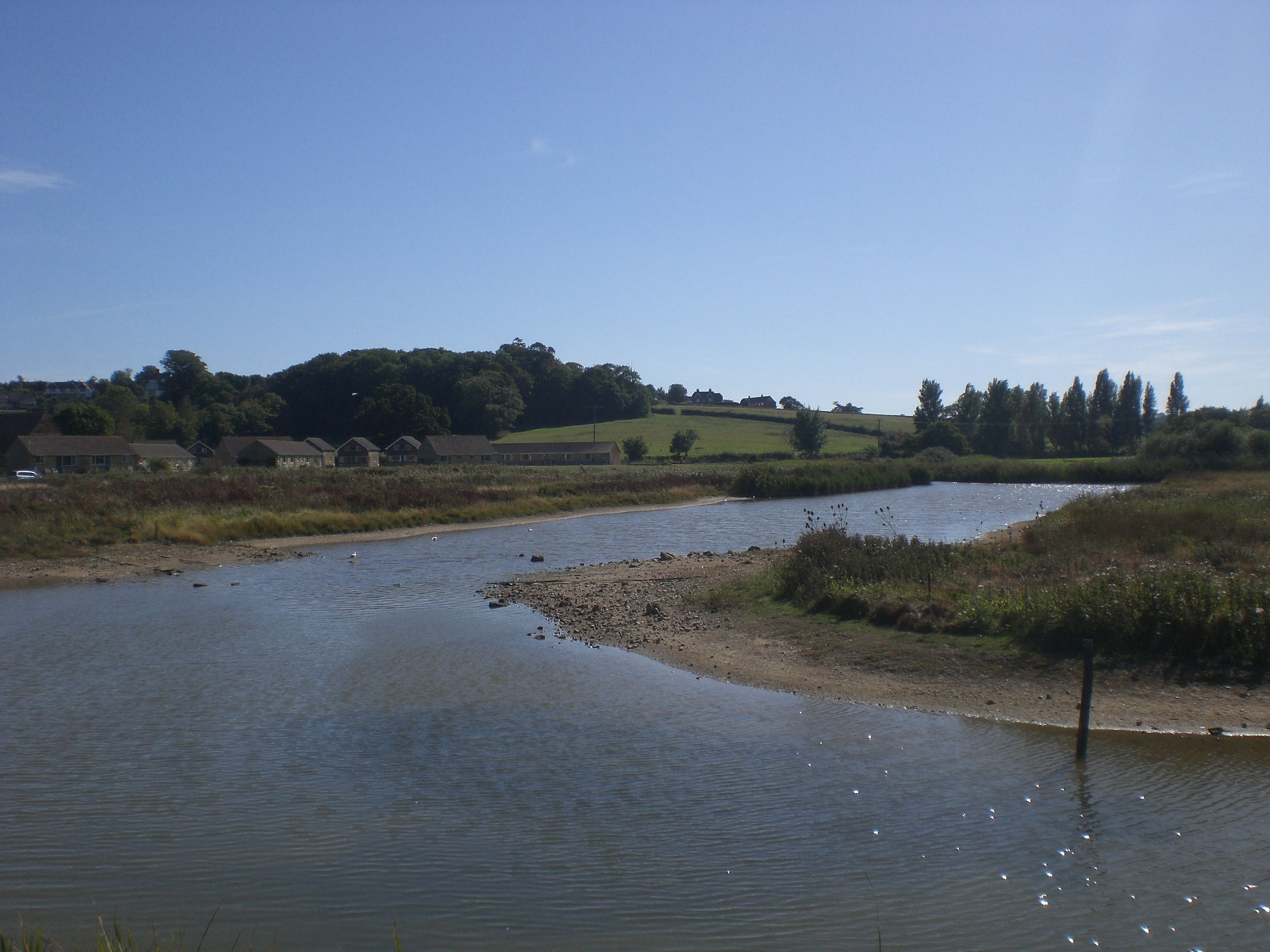
Main stream at the nature reserve

It was named after Alan Hersey, a councillor who was interested in Seaview and the surrounding areas.

It used to be an estuary, during the time of Bembridge Isle (Binbridge Isle).
