= Hersey =

Hersey may refer to:

== Places ==
=== United States ===
- Hersey, Maine, a town
- Hersey, Michigan, a village
- Hersey, Wisconsin, an unincorporated community
- Hersey Township (disambiguation)
- Hersey (MBTA station), below-grade commuter rail station in Needham, Massachusetts
- John Hersey High School, in Illinois

=== United Kingdom ===
- Alan Hersey Nature Reserve, on the Isle of Wight
- a possible Old Norse name for the Isle of Arran

== Other uses ==
- Hersey (name)
- USS General M. L. Hersey (AP-148), transport ship for the U.S. Navy in World War II

== See also ==
- Heresy
- Hershey (disambiguation)
