= Pondwell =

Place on the Isle of Wight, UK

Coordinates: 50°43′05″N 1°07′46″W

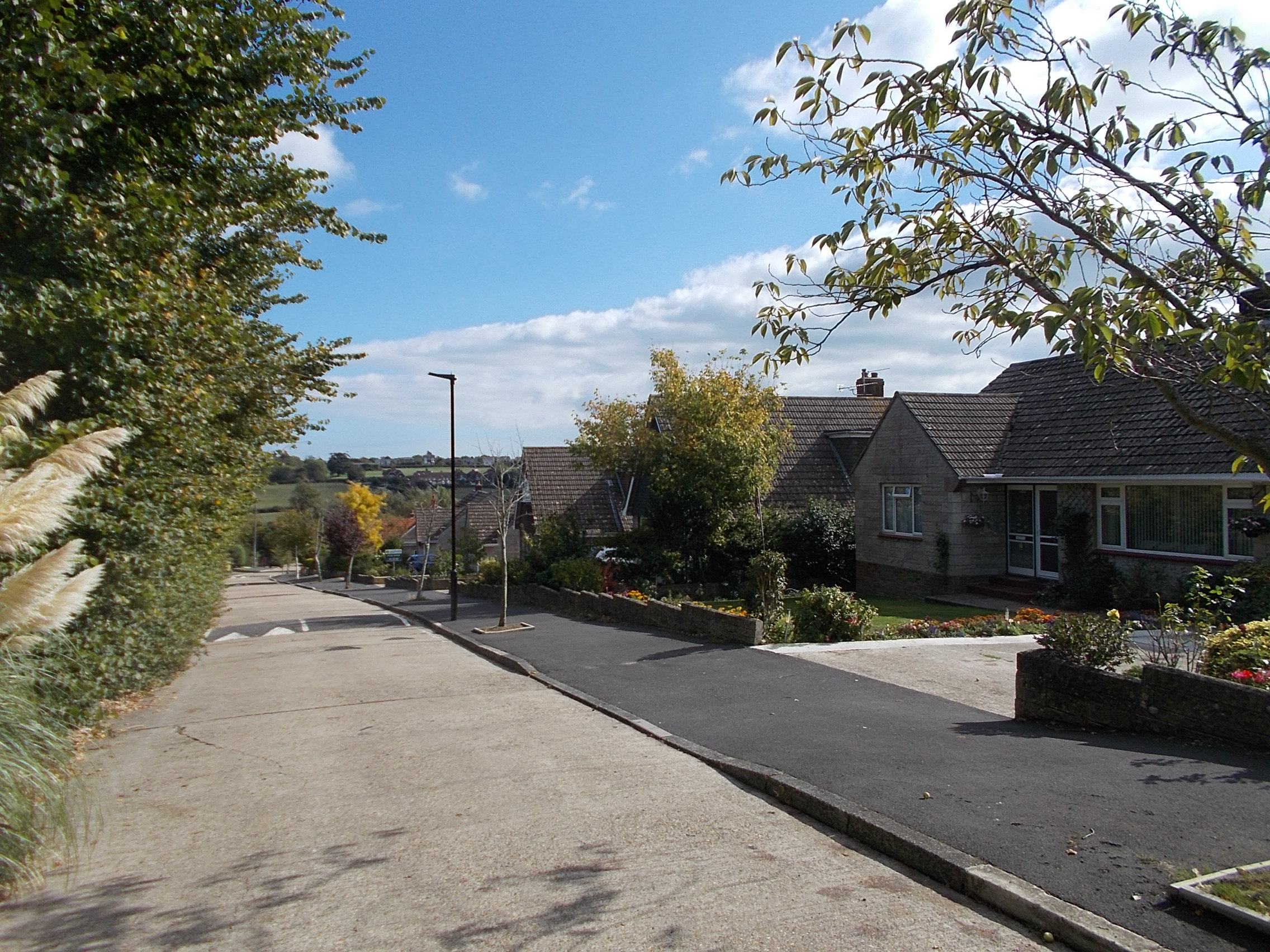
Gregory Avenue, Pondwell

Pondwell is an area between Nettlestone and Ryde on the Isle of Wight, off the southern coast of England. According to the Post Office the population for the area at the 2011 Census was included in the civil parish of Nettlestone and Seaview.

The houses are arranged to the south east of a crossroads known as Bullen Cross, which features a vintage electricity junction box from a 19th-century local power generating company. Known as a "supply pillar" it features a once-plentiful "batwing" lantern manufactured by Electric Street Lighting Apparatus (ESLA) of Canterbury.

Pondwell is also the site of Seaview Wildlife Encounter – formerly Flamingo Park – a small zoo and waterfowl park. The beach at the bottom of the Salterns was formerly a thriving harbour for timber export; at that time the low-lying land at the foot of Pondwell Hill formed a tidal inlet of the sea known as Barnsley Creek.

The Isle of Wight Distillery, makers of Mermaid Gin, has had its headquarters in Pondwell.

== Name ==
The name is from Middle English ponde 'a pond, a pool'.

1663: Nettlestone Ponds

1799: Pownells Farm

1840: Pondwell's House and Ground

1862: Pondwell House
