= Puckpool =

Coastal village on the Isle of Wight

Coordinates: 50.726°N 1.135°W

- Village
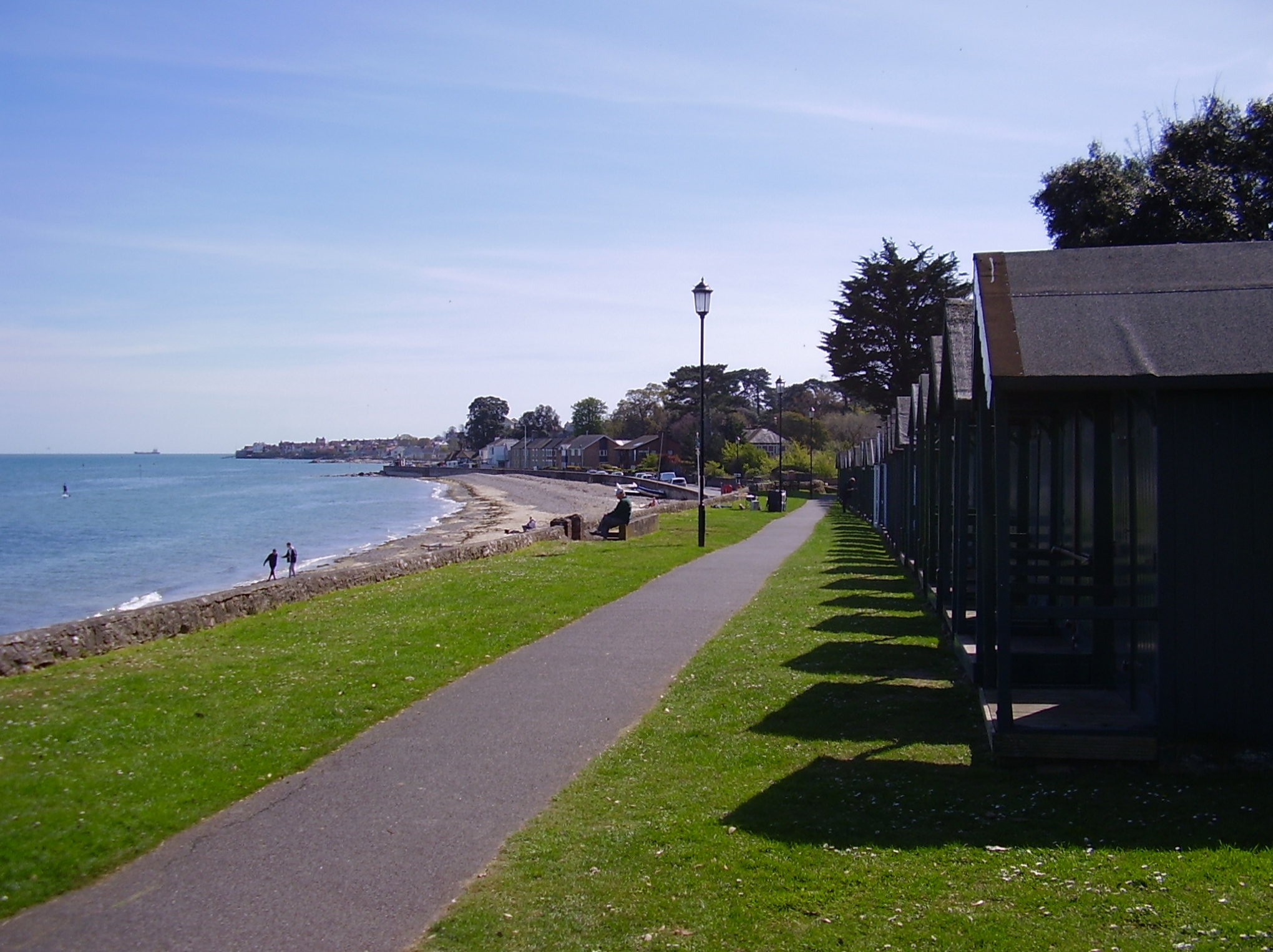
- Beach huts at Puckpool, looking towards Spring Vale and Seaview

- Location within the Isle of Wight
- OS grid reference: SZ6093691814
- Civil parish: Ryde; Nettlestone and Seaview
- Unitary authority: Isle of Wight
- Ceremonial county: Isle of Wight
- Region: South East
- Country: England
- Sovereign state: United Kingdom
- Post town: RYDE
- Postcode district: PO
- Police: Hampshire and Isle of Wight
- Fire: Hampshire and Isle of Wight
- Ambulance: Isle of Wight

Puckpool is a small coastal settlement on the outskirts of Ryde on the Isle of Wight. The area is best known for Puckpool Park, a park with an 18-hole putting green, 12 hole mini golf and two tennis courts. Puckpool Battery is located within the boundaries of the park; this is an old Palmerston Fort built in 1865.

== Name ==
Its name probably means 'the pool belonging to a man called Cuca', from Old English Cuca (personal name) and pōl. The change from Cuckpool to Puckpool has only happened within the last few centuries, as it may have been associated with puck, a modern form of Old English pūca, meaning 'a goblin'.

1086 (Domesday Book): Chochepon

1255: Cukepole

1287-1290: Cokepole

1316: Cokepoule

1769: Puck Pool

1826: Puckpool or Popful (Point)

The Domesday Book spelling is of Norman origin.

== Overview ==
Puckpool Point features a natural sheltered bay offering a large expanse of sand and a gently sloping beach which becomes very popular with tourists and local residents during the summer season. A wide pedestrian and cycle promenade leading to Puckpool Point lines the entire bay. Until December 2009 Southern Vectis operated standard bus service 16 which served the area between Ryde and Bembridge via Seaview and St Helens. However, no route currently serves the park and the arrangements for summer 2010 are not known. The Ryde Road Train is also operated during the summer, designed to transport tourists from Ryde to the beach and park at Puckpool.
