= Flamingo Park =

Flamingo Park may refer to:

- Flamingo Park, former name of Seaview Wildlife Encounter in South East England
- Flamingo Park Historic Residential District in West Palm Beach, Florida
- Flamingo Field in Miami Beach, Florida
- Flamengo Park in Rio de Janeiro, Brazil
