= Seagrove Bay =

Bay on the Isle of Wight, England

Coordinates: 50°43′N 1°06′W

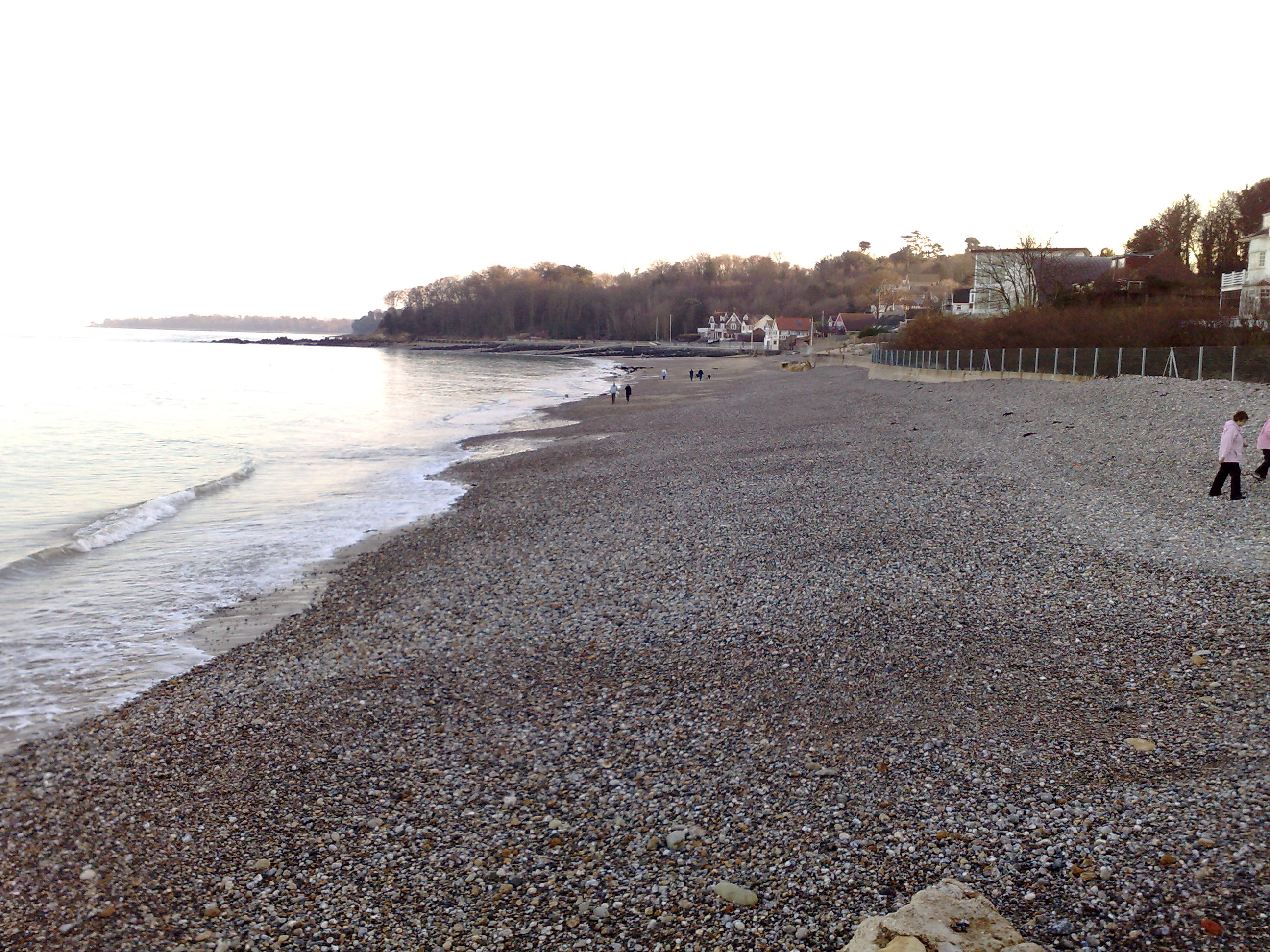
- The pebble beach at Seagrove Bay

- Location within the Isle of Wight
- Civil parish: Nettlestone and Seaview
- Ceremonial county: Isle of Wight
- Region: South East
- Country: England
- Sovereign state: United Kingdom
- UK Parliament: Isle of Wight East

Seagrove Bay is a bay on the northeast coast of the Isle of Wight, England. It lies to the east of the village of Seaview facing towards Selsey Bill with a 2/3 mile (1.1 km) shoreline stretching from Nettlestone Point in the north to Horestone Point in the south. The bay has both the Seaside Award Flag and the Water Quality Award.

Roughly at the centre is a public slipway, to the north of the slipway is a straight pebble beach and there are many shallow private mooring buoys out in the bay. At the southernmost end of the bay is a wooden walkway which gives access from the end of the seawall to Horestone Point and Priory Bay beyond even during the high tide. The bay previously had public toilets which were demolished in 2015 - with a new block set to be built. Though as of 2018 the construction is stalled due to a land-dispute and portaloos had to be installed at the beach for tourists.

The bay is used in the title of the life peer Lord Oakeshott as Baron Oakeshott of Seagrove Bay, of Seagrove in the county of Isle of Wight.

== Geography ==
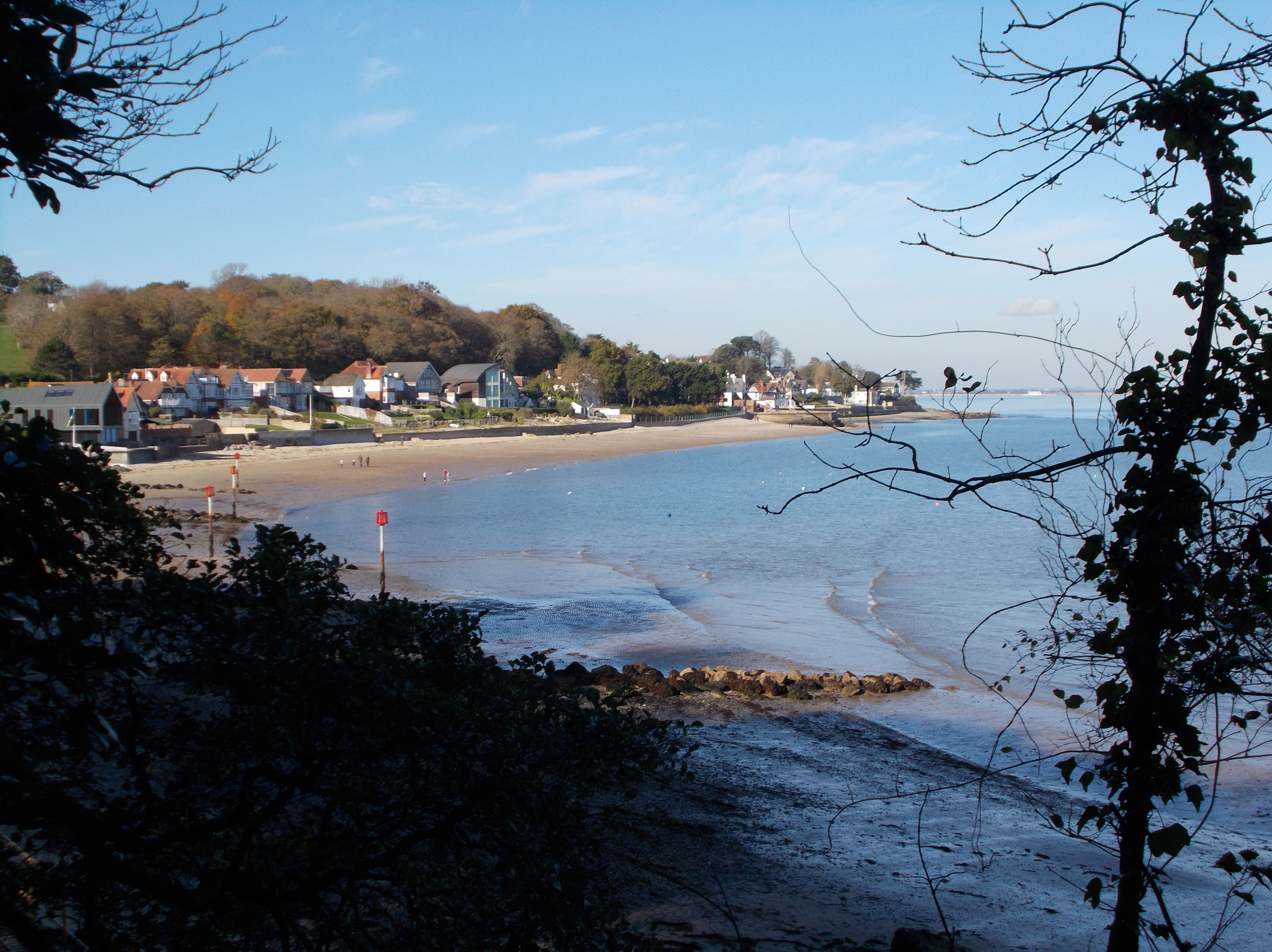
Seagrove Bay from Horestone Point

The bay was created between two rocky limestone headlands by the coastal erosion of a soft clay stata due to this weak geology the bay used to be prone to landslips. The sea bottom is sandy and gently shallowing.

=== Coastal management ===
To the south of the slipway is a curved concrete seawall protecting the shoreline, properties and boathouses. In addition, there are four 100 ft groynes made of rock piles running out perpendicularly from the seawall into the bay. Each one has a post with a red can marking its seaward end. The beach between the groynes is predominantly sand but is completely covered at high water.

After a number of landslips around the isle in the early 2000s slope reactivation measures were used to support to the shoreline and also due to coastal winds the sandy beach had depleted. Beach levels fell around a metre (3 ft) in the decade prior to 2007, this affected the seawall by exposing the foundations so work to correct this was undertaken.
