= Hersey (name) =

Hersey is both a surname and a given name. Notable people with the name include:

== Surname ==
- David Hersey (born 1939), American lighting designer
- Derek Hersey (1956–1993), British rock climber
- Ira G. Hersey (1858–1943), politician from the U.S. state of Maine
- John Hersey (1914–1993), American writer
- Kathleen Hersey (born 1990), American swimmer
- Mark L. Hersey (1863–1934), United States Army officer
- Mayo D. Hersey (1886–1978), American engineer
- Samuel F. Hersey (1812–1875), politician from the U.S. state of Maine
- Thayer David, born David Thayer Hersey (1927–1978), American actor

== Middle name ==
- William Hersey Hopkins (1841–1919), American academic and college administrator

== Given name ==
- Hersey Hawkins (born 1966), former American professional basketball player
- Hersey Hope, Marchioness of Linlithgow (1867–1937), British aristocrat
- Hersey Kyota (born 1953), Palau politician

== See also ==
- Hersey (disambiguation)
- Hersey & Son, Silversmiths
