= 1987 Women's World Championship (snooker) =

Tournament information
- City: Puckpool
- Country: United Kingdom
- Organisation: World Ladies Billiards and Snooker Association
- Format: Knockout
- Total prize fund: £10,000
- Winner's share: £3,500

Final
- Champion: (England) Ann-Marie Farren
- Runner-up: (England) Stacey Hillyard
- Score: 5–1

The 1987 Women's World Championship was a snooker tournament that took place in Puckpool on the Isle of Wight. It was the 1987 edition of the World Women's Snooker Championship, which had been first held in 1976.

Ann-Marie Farren won the tournament, beating Stacey Hillyard 5–1 in the final. Aged 16 years and 47 days, Farren remains the youngest female world snooker champion.

== Tournament summary ==
The event was sponsored by Warner who provided a total prize fund of £10,000. The event was held at Warner's Puckpool holiday camp.

Allison Fisher was the defending champion and a strong favourite to regain the title, having not lost a competitive women's snooker match since the semi-final of the 1984 World Championship against Stacey Hillyard. Hillyard had gone on to win the 1984 title, and was seeded fourth for 1987. Hillyard was to beat Fisher in the semi-final again, recovering from 1–3 down to win 4–3 in a four-hour match. In the other semi-final, second seed Ann-Marie Farren whitewashed Mandy Fisher 4–0.

In the final, Farren took a 3–0 lead before Hillyard won a frame. Farren then took the next two frames to complete a 5–1 victory and claim the winner's prize of £3,500, and the trophy, plus a double magnum of champagne that she was not old enough to drink, being only 16 years and 48 days old at the time.

== Knockout ==
Players listed in bold indicate match winner. Seedings, where known, are bracketed after the players name.

Last 16; Best of 5 frames
(England) **Allison Fisher** (1)	**3**
(England) Lisa Gordon	0
(England) Maria Tart	0
(England) **Karen Leech**	**3**
(England) Georgina Aplin	**3**
(England) Julie Dowen	0
(England) **Stacey Hillyard** (4)	**3**
(England) Jayne Heyhurst	1
(England) **Mandy Fisher**	**3**
(England) Rebecca Clements	1
(England) **June Banks**	**3**
(Republic of Ireland) Margaret O'Driscoll	2
(Scotland) Lynette Horsburgh	1
(England) **Angela Jones**	**3**
(England) **Ann-Marie Farren** (2)	**3**
(Wales) Agnes Davies	1

Quarter-finals; Best of 7 frames
(England) **Allison Fisher** (1)	**4**
(England) Karen Leech	0
(England) Georgina Aplin	1
(England) **Stacey Hillyard** (4)	**4**
(England) **Mandy Fisher**	**4**
(England) June Banks	1
(England) Angela Jones	1
(England) **Ann-Marie Farren** (2)	**4**

Semi-finals; Best of 7 frames
(England) Allison Fisher (1)	3
(England) **Stacey Hillyard** (4)	**4**
(England) Mandy Fisher	0
(England) **Ann-Marie Farren** (2)	**4**

Final; Best of 9 frames
(England) Stacey Hillyard (4)	**1**
(England) **Ann-Marie Farren** (2)	**5**

== Final ==
Final: Best-of-9 frames Puckpool
Ann-Marie Farren (England)	5–1			Stacey Hillyard (England)		
Frame	1	2	3	4	5	6
Ann-Marie Farren	49	77	49	9	56	62
Stacey Hillyard	37	37	25	70	30	6
Frames won (Farren first)	1–0	2–0	3–0	3–1	4–1	5–1
Ann-Marie Farren wins the 1987 Women's World Championship
