= Puckpool Battery =

- Puckpool Point, Isle of Wight, England
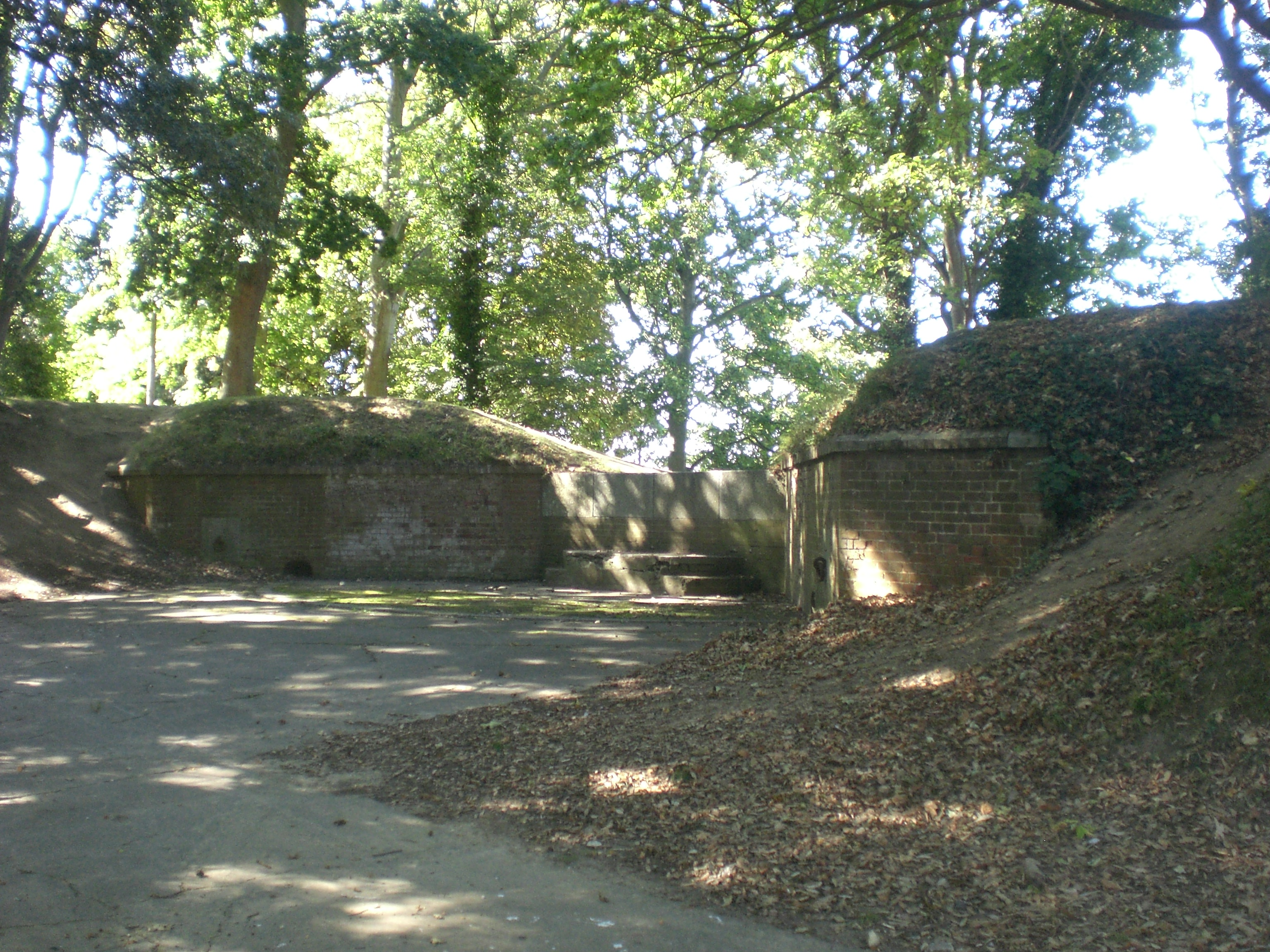
- Gun position for 11-inch Rifled Muzzle Loading (RML) gun

Site information
- Owner: Local authority
- Open to the public: Yes
- Condition: Mostly complete

Location
- Coordinates: 50°43′39″N 1°07′46″W

Site history
- Built: 1863-March 1865
- In use: Sold 1928
- Materials: Earth; Concrete

Puckpool Battery (map reference SZ615923) is a battery located at Puckpool Point, close to the town of Ryde on the Isle of Wight. It is one of the many Palmerston Forts built on the island to protect it in response to a perceived French invasion. Construction of the battery began in 1863 and was completed by March 1865.

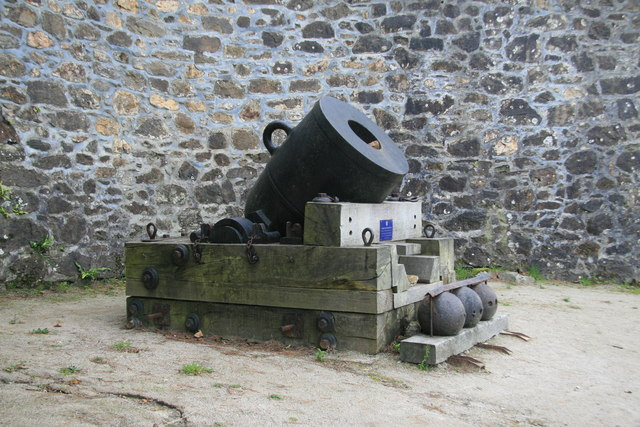
13-inch mortar of the type that formed the original armament

During construction of the battery it was decided that it would be armed entirely with 50 of the heaviest mortars – at that time the 13-inch smooth bore mortar. This would enable the battery to provide large amounts of high angle plunging fire into the Solent, targeted at the vulnerable unarmoured decks of warships.

In 1873, four gun positions were constructed at the sea face of the battery for four 11-inch Rifled Muzzle Loading (RML) guns. By 1886, these four guns and 30 mortars provided the entire armament of the battery. The following year all of the mortars were removed as they were obsolete by that time.

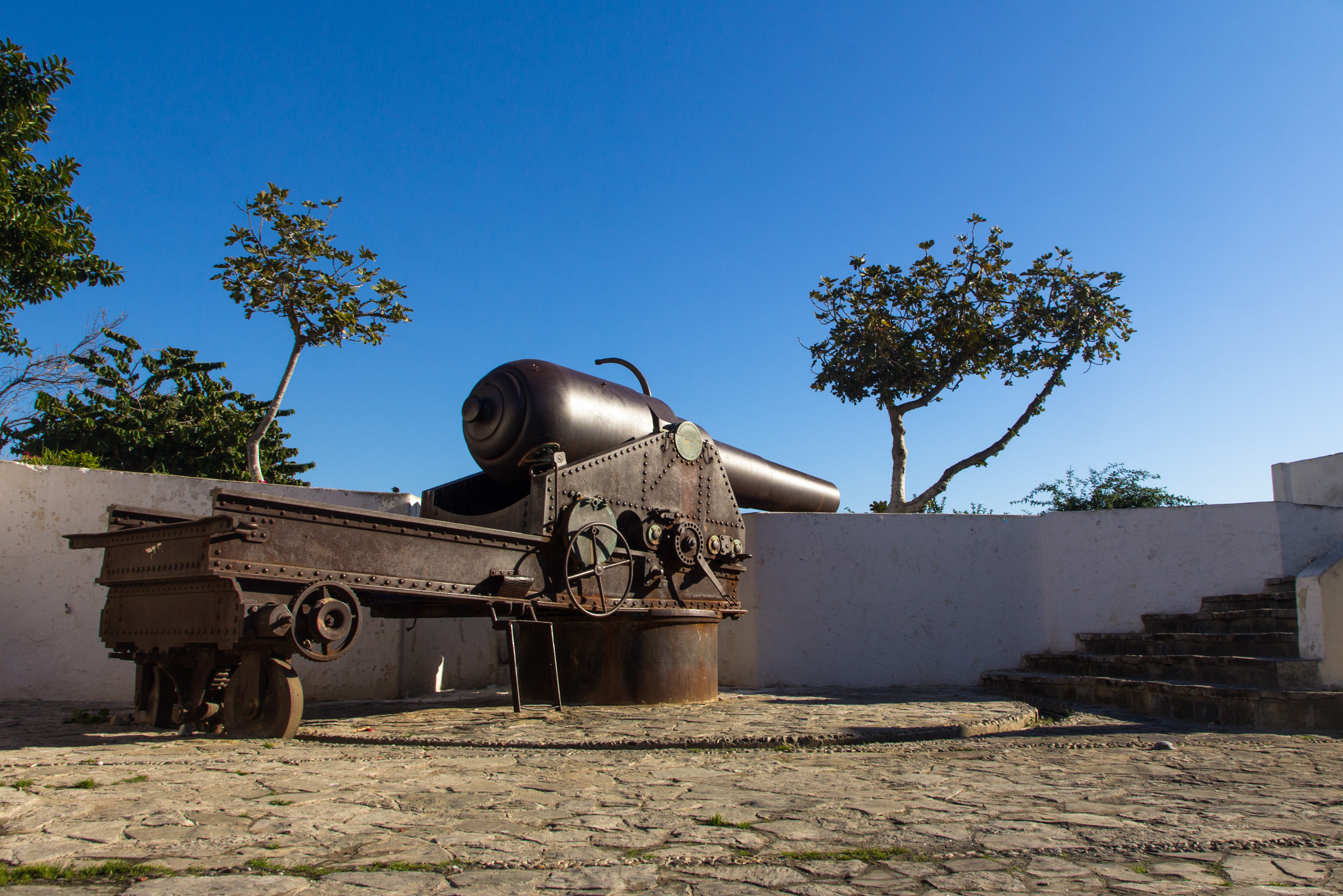
A coastal RML 10.4-inch gun of the same type in Tangier

In 1888, a proposal for two 10.4-inch 28-ton RML guns on an Armstrong protected barbette was put forward, and these had been fitted by 1892. They were the only guns of this type to be fitted in Great Britain. In 1901, the armament of the battery was modernised with positions for two 9.2-inch Breech Loading (BL) guns and two 6-inch Breech Loading (BL) guns.

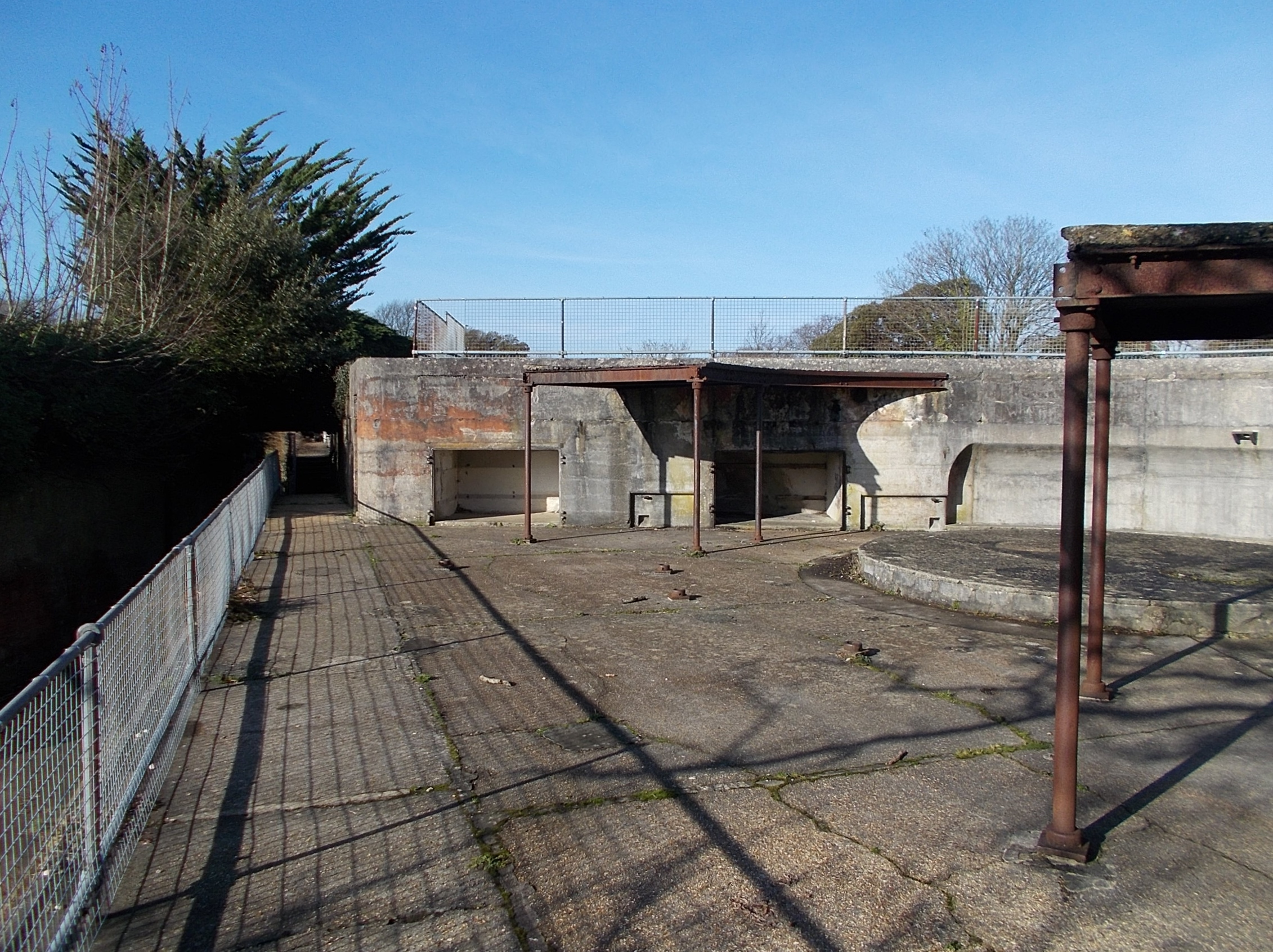
Gun emplacement for 9.2-inch Breech Loading (BL) gun

The battery was disarmed in 1927 and sold to the local district council the following year. It was brought back into use during the Second World War as HMS Medina to train men of the Fleet Air Arm.

It has been used as a public recreational space since that time and has since been designated a Scheduled Ancient Monument. The gun positions are openly accessible and a number of original buildings survive. These include the guard room, barrack block and magazines.

== Publications ==
- Hogg, Ian V (1974). Coast Defences of England and Wales 1856-1956. David & Charles. ISBN 0-7153 6353-0.
- Moore, David, 2010. The East Wight Defences, Solent Papers Number 10, David Moore, Gosport. ISBN 0954845331
