= Priory Woods =

Geological site

Coordinates: 50.70618°N 1.10210°W

- Site of Special Scientific Interest
- Location of Priory Woods.
- Area of search: Isle of Wight
- Grid reference: SZ635900
- Interest: Geological
- Area: 2.94 ha (7.3 acres)
- Notification date: 1998
- Location map: Natural England

Priory Woods (grid reference SZ635900) is a 2.94 hectare geological Site of Special Scientific Interest near the large village of Bembridge, Isle of Wight, notified in 1998. It is a National Trust property and is served by a public footpath. Concealed within it is "The Priory Oyster" - an oyster bar attached to the Priory Bay Hotel and open only in the height of summer. It has significant recent archaeology with the remains of a sea wall and rusted iron railings. Acheulean hand axes have been found in strata dated from c.400,000 years ago, which would indicate their users were early Neanderthals or late Homo heidelbergensis. The woods overlook Priory Bay and its private beach.
