= South Parade Pier =

Pier in Portsmouth, England

Coordinates: 50°46.698′N 1°04.566′W

- South Parade Pier in October 2026
- Type: Pleasure
- Carries: Pedestrians
- Location: Portsmouth

Characteristics
- Total length: 600 feet (180 m)

History
- Opening date: 26 July 1879; 147 years ago

South Parade Pier is a pier in Portsmouth, England. It is one of two piers in the city, the other being Clarence Pier. The pier once had a long hall down its centre which housed a seating area and a small restaurant. The outside of the hall is a promenade which runs the length of the pier. Once fallen into disrepair, as of 2017, the pier has been developed into an amusement arcade and food outlet.

The South Parade Pier, in Southsea, part of the English city of Portsmouth, is a pleasure pier offering typical seaside attractions including souvenir shops, ice creams, indoor amusements and a small children's funfair. It also contains a fishing deck and two function rooms which are often used for live music.

== History ==
=== Early history ===
The history of the pier has been eventful; like many UK piers. It was authorised by the Southsea South Parade Pier Order 1878, and construction started in 1878 and was officially opened on 26 July 1879.

South Parade Pier was primarily built for a Victorian-era Isle of Wight ferry service, the pier was located only 500 metres (0.3 miles) from the Southsea Railway terminus station in Granada Road, Southsea.

The pier's pavilion was destroyed by fire on 19 July 1904. The pier was then sold to Portsmouth Corporation for £10,782, with the transfer authorised by the Portsmouth Corporation (South Parade Pier) Order 1907. The pier officially reopened 12 August 1908. In 1914 in an attempt to improve the financial prospects of Seaview Chain Pier the Seaview steam packet company was formed and began running a service between Seaview Chain Pier and South Parade Pier. The service came a halt in September 1914 and was formally prevented from further running by the Admiralty in 1915.

=== Mid 20th century ===
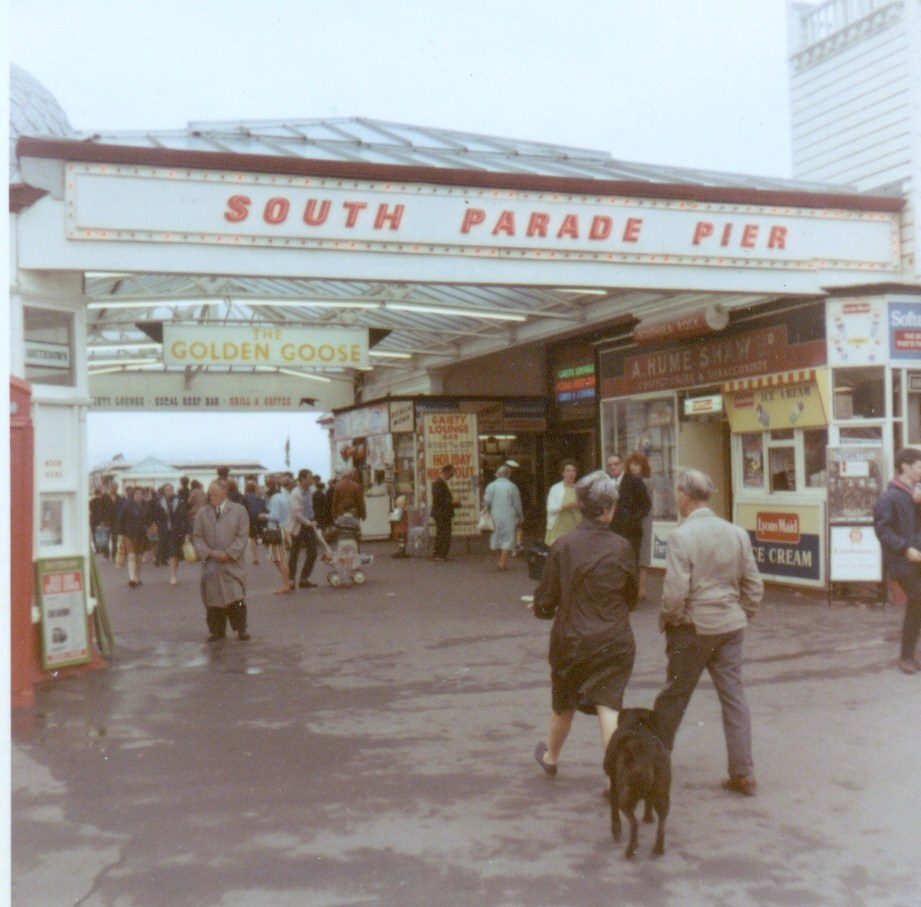
South Parade Pier in 1967

It was partly dismantled during the Second World War in an attempt to hinder any invasion.

On June 11, 1974, during shooting of the film Tommy, the pier caught fire. Around 400 visitors plus film extras had to run for safety, with some jumping into the sea to escape the flames. The film crew were situated in a dance hall in the middle of the pier when drummer Joe Nicholls, who had to abandon his drum kit, noticed black polythene coating over the windows. The majority of people on the pier at the time were extras for the film, while Nicholls noted that the evacuation was relatively ordinary, with only a small scramble towards the end. Around half the seaward end of the pier was destroyed, including the loss of the ballroom and a children's playground. One theory for the cause was due to arc lights overheating, while other sources noted that smoke canisters were used and plastic sheeting caught fire, with the flames, which could be seen from around 10 miles (16 km) away, quickly engulfing the wooden ballroom structure.

In the 1980s the pier's Gaiety and Albert ballrooms were used several times a week for discos organised by Portsmouth Polytechnic students. The pier appeared in an episode of Mr. Bean entitled Mind the Baby, Mr. Bean.

=== 21st century ===
The Pier was sold to three businessmen in 2010, who pledged to restore it to its former glory. The iconic pier is now owned by Frederick Nash, director of Hampshire property firm Matchams South Coast, and partners Tony Marshall, a London lawyer, and Cambridgeshire stud farm proprietor David Moore.

Location filming took place at South Parade Pier during October 2024 for the film adaptation of Project Hail Mary, which was released in March 2026.

== Refurbishment and reopening ==
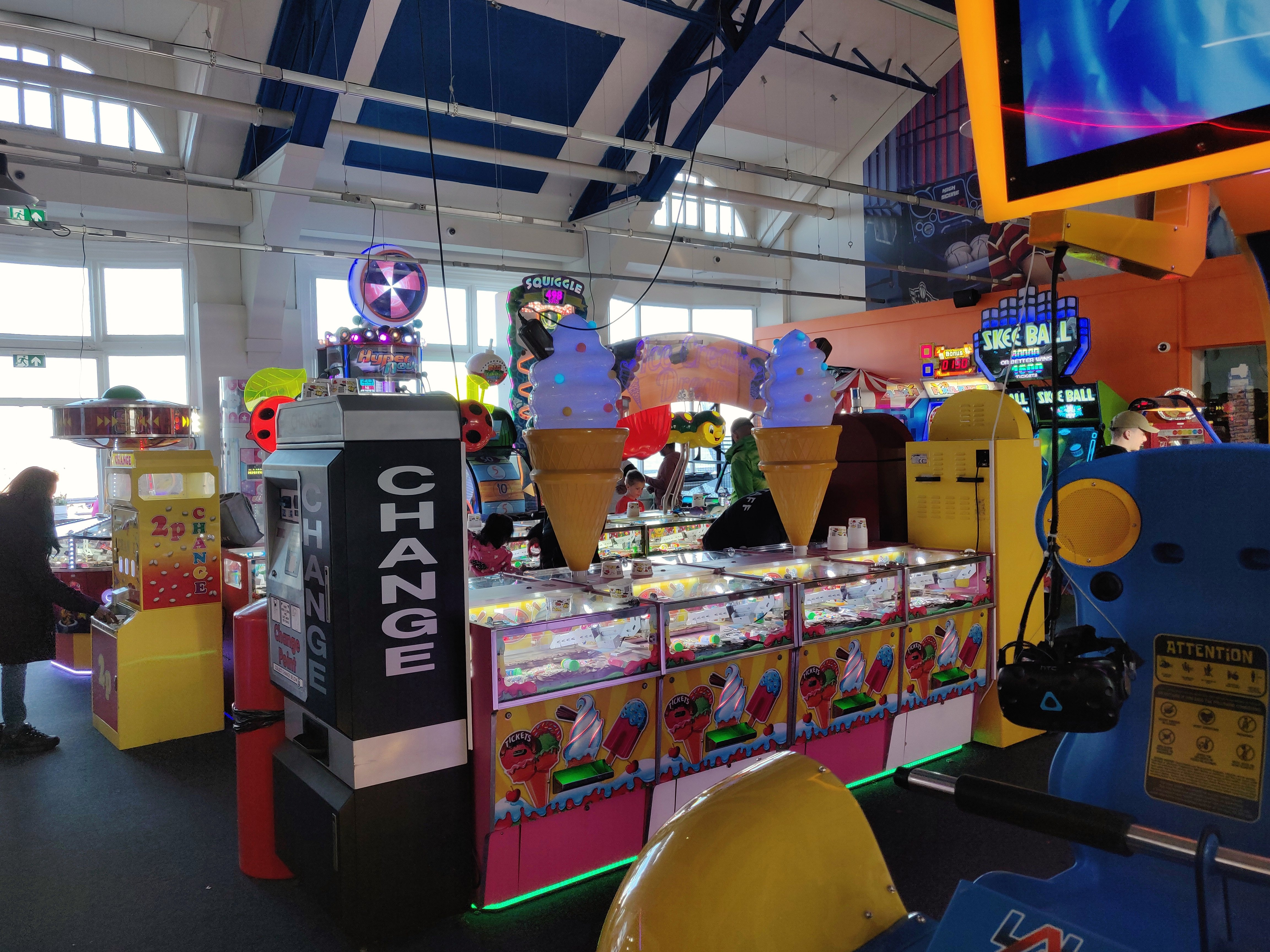
Amusements at the pier

The deck was closed to the general public due to health and safety concerns in April 2012. Limited access was granted to people fishing, but access was withdrawn for all other potential users. At the beginning of November the pier was completely closed and fenced off by Portsmouth City Council as it was a danger to the public. A couple of days later the council reopened the front of the pier, which included part of the arcade and other bits which are on land.

In December 2012, an attempt to sell the pier at auction failed. Parts of the boat deck at the end of South Parade Pier broke off and washed up on Southsea beach after being battered by bad weather on the night of 5 February 2014. Shops that face the South Parade reopened in April 2015. The pier was purchased by South Parade Pier Limited in 2014, who in June 2015 submitted plans to the council to bring the pier back into use as a music venue and as a mooring for boats. By this time, 95% of the structural repair work had been completed, to shortly be followed by building refurbishment.

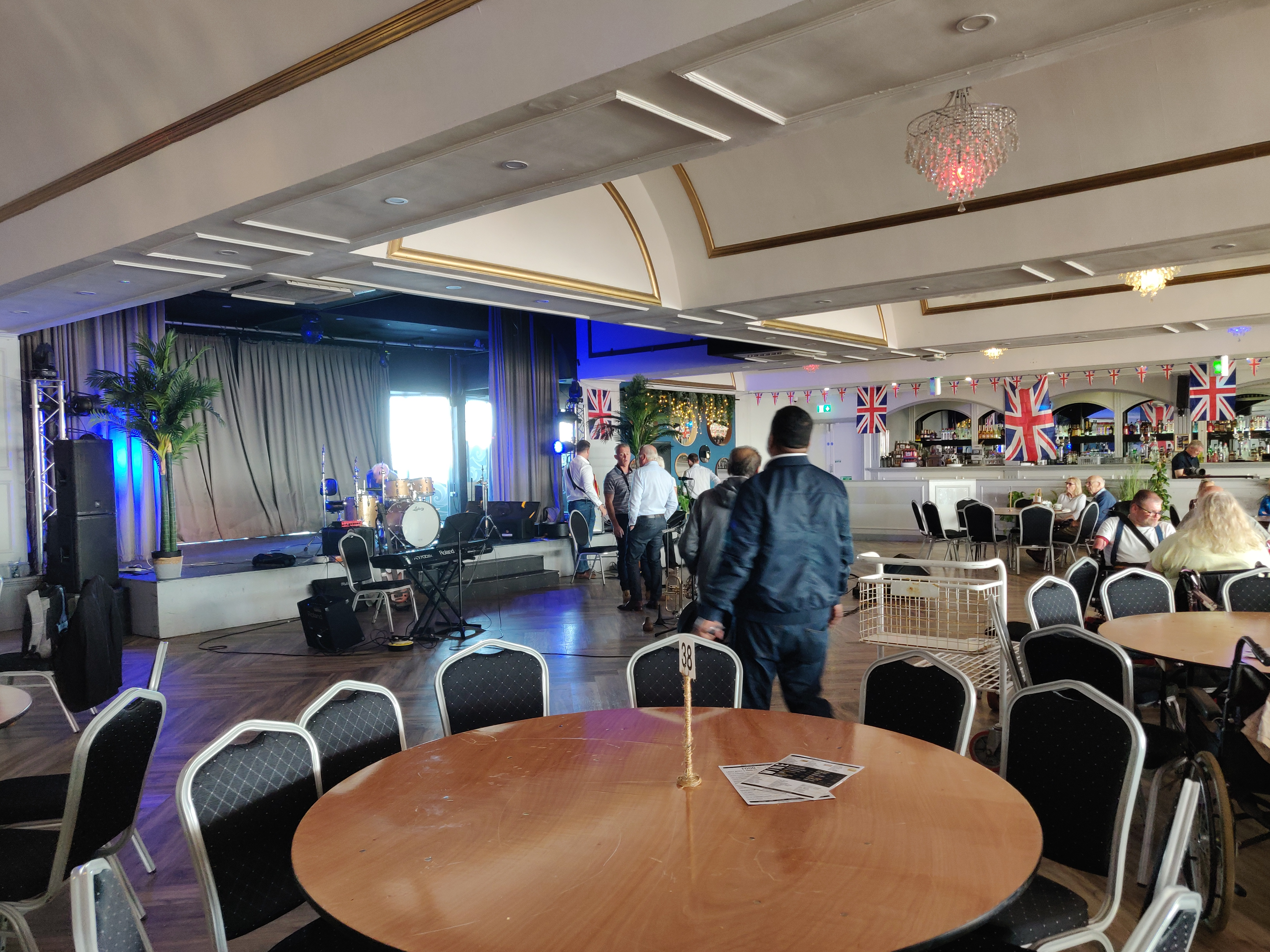
Gaiety Bar

The Pier was finally repaired and reopened on 14 April 2017 with a refurbished amusement arcade and a cafe. Deep Blue Restaurants opened in the Summer in the former Albert Tavern building. The pier is now run by the South Parade trust which aims to acquire and improve, sustain and develop the property and business of South Parade Pier.

In July 2019, a Funfair named "Kidz Island" was opened on the pier. In November 2019, it was confirmed that Richard Cadell had signed a deal to keep the Funfair on the Pier under a 15-year licence. The final restoration works completed in November 2019 with the opening of a £200,000 rebuilt boat deck, the former being removed in 2014 due to storms.

== Kidz Island attractions ==
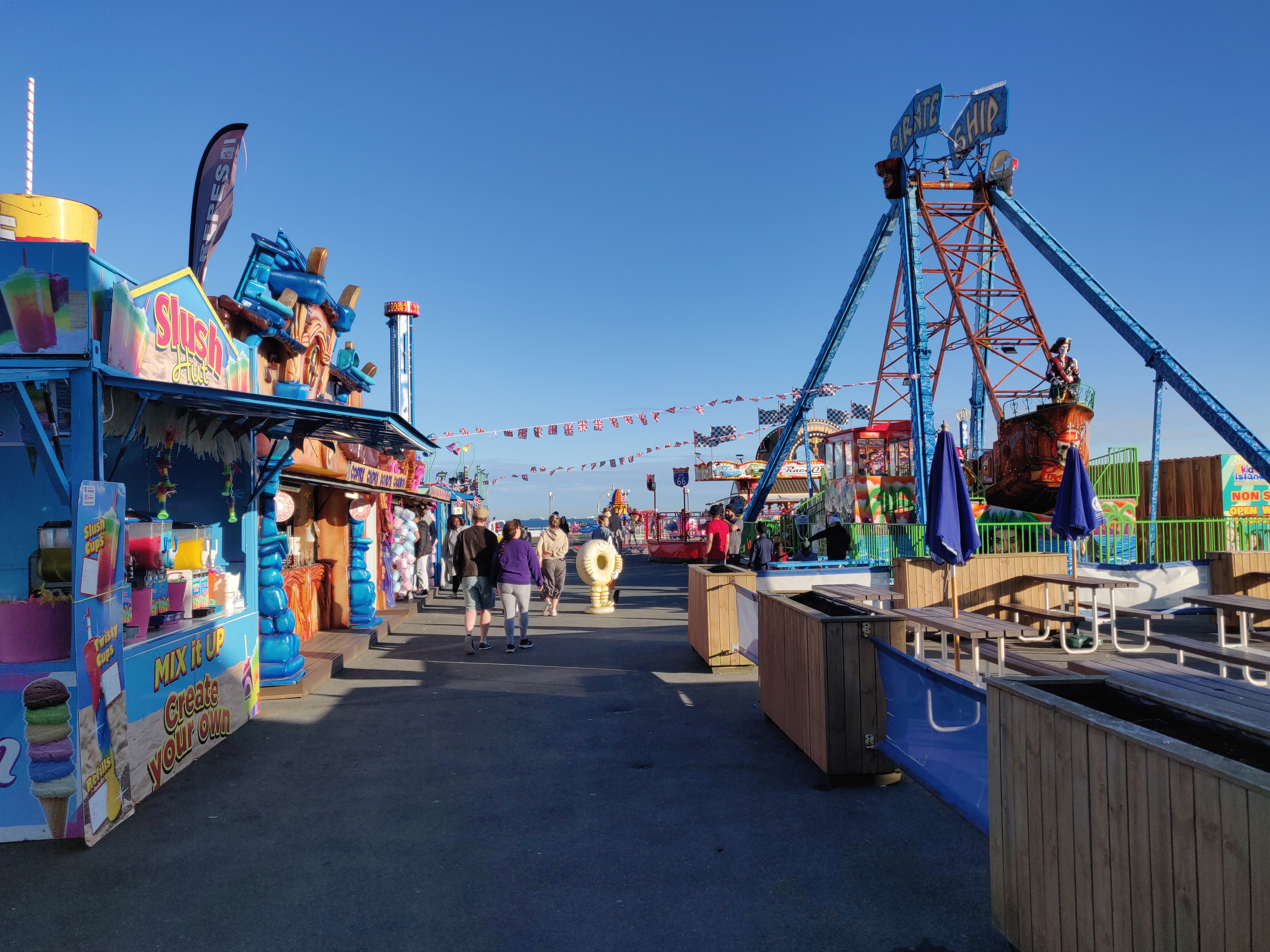
Kids Island fairground

=== Current ===
Name	Opened	Manufacturer	Description
Bumper Carz	2021		Land-based Bumper Boats. Did not appear for the 2024 season, but returned in 2025.
Drop 'n' Twist	2021	SBF Visa Group	A mini drop-tower ride.
Happy Caterpillar	2020	Güven Lunapark	A Wacky Worm Roller Coaster.
Helicopters	2020	PM Rides	A Disney-themed Helicopter ride.
Heroes	2024	Rides & Fun	Miami ride,
Miami Surf	2021	Danum UK	A mini miami ride.
Pirate	2020	Güven Lunapark	A Pirate Ship.
Quadbikes	2019		Mini Quad Bikes.

=== Former ===
Name	Opened	Removed	Description
100 Smiles an Hour	2019	2020	A Kiddie Chair O' Planes Ride.
Carousel	2019	2020	A traditional Carousel.
Dodgems	2019	2019	A traditional Bumper Car ride. It was lent to the Pier by an independent operator for the 2019 season.
Giant Helter-Skelter	2019	2019	A traditional Helter-Skelter built by Supercar. It was lent to the Pier by an Independent operator for the 2019 season.
Happy Catapiller	2019	2019	A Wacky Worm Roller Coaster built by Pinfari. This was relocated from the nearby Clarence Pier and was lent to South Parade Pier for the 2019 Season.
Mini Jets	2019	2023	A Mini Jet Ride with themed cars.
Race-O-Rama	2022	2024	A Cars themed convoy ride.
Wacky Races	2019	2024	A small convoy car ride.

Awards and achievements
Preceded by Hastings Pier	National Piers Society; Pier of the Year; 2018	Succeeded by Worthing Pier
