= Corder House and Sydenham House =

Buildings in Sunderland, England

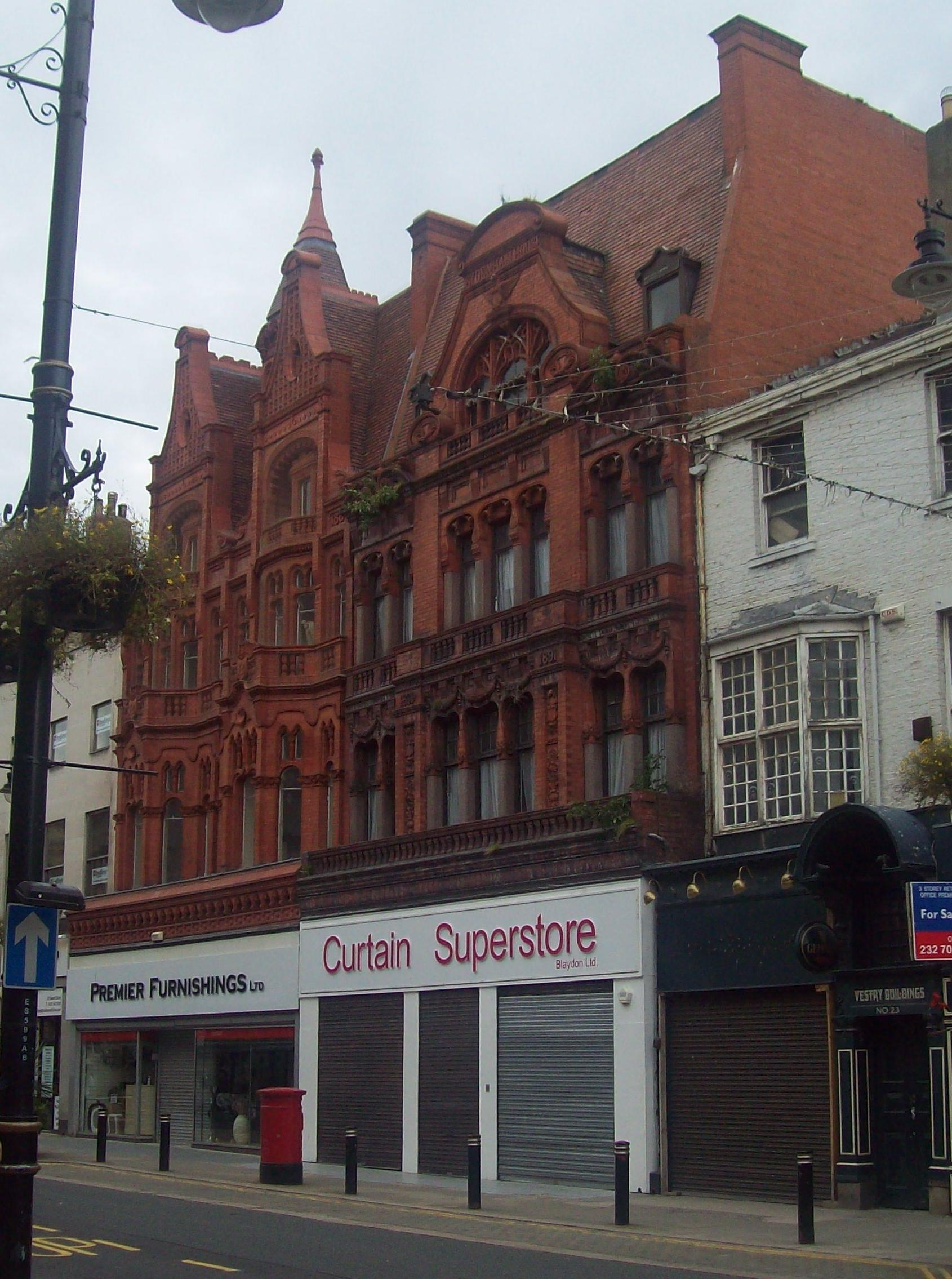
- Corder House (left) and Sydenham House (right)

- Location within Tyne and Wear

General information
- Architectural style: Neo-Moorish
- Location: 21 and 22 Fawcett Street, Sunderland, United Kingdom
- Coordinates: 54.906286°N 1.381487°W
- Construction started: 1889
- Completed: 1891

Technical details
- Floor count: 4 (each)

Design and construction
- Architect: Frank Caws

Corder House and Sydenham House are two, adjacent, Grade II listed buildings on Fawcett Street, in Sunderland, Tyne and Wear, England. Designed by Frank Caws in the Neo-Moorish style, they were constructed in brick from 1889–1891 by David and John Rankin with terracotta features by J. C. Edwards of Ruabon.

== Corder House ==
Corder House was constructed for a local drapery company, Corder's, owned by Alexander Corder. It is four storeys high, including the attic. The building has a ground floor panelled fascia and a cusped arcaded frieze with roll-moulded coping. The projecting canted bays on the arcaded first floor are flanked by narrow lights with Gothic capitals to the pilasters and the elaborate heads over the central lights of the canted bays; all are with paired, mullioned cusped overlights and a dripstring. The second-floor central balustraded balcony has panels with Gothic letters; the curvilinear windows with paired arcaded top lights have shallow canted centres under the balustraded attic balconies. The elliptical-headed cusped attic arches to the recessed windows are flanked by scrolls and pilasters which rise to high shaped gables with terracotta patterns, central oval lights, and raised segmental pediments. The dates 1856 and 1889 are in the outer panels at the eaves level. The steeply pitched roof has a central lantern with Gothic lights and a high, conical roof.

== Sydenham House ==
Sydenham House is four storeys high, including the attic. It has a moulded ground floor fascia and frieze below a full-width balcony with a stone balustrade. The first floor windows, tripartite in the centre and paired in the outer bays, have upper glazing bars in curvilinear heads below the swags and the second floor balcony which projects in the centre over panelled pilasters defining the first floor central bay. The square-headed second floor lights have raised arches with pendants, the central bay is defined by plain pilasters with scrolled pediment heads under a panelled band and outer scrolled pediments. The central attic gable has a raised segmental pediment over an eclectic tracery of a wide arched light containing smaller cusped lights. Its steeply pitched roof has an end chimney.

== See also ==
- Elephant Tea Rooms

== Sources ==
- "Sunderland City Council: Listed buildings register - Description". Archived from the original on 17 October 2013.
- "A walk through the Central Sunderland Conservation Area (Sunniside)". Archived from the original on 21 August 2014.
- "Sunderland" (PDF). Archived from the original (PDF) on 22 May 2011.
