= Frank Caws =

English architect

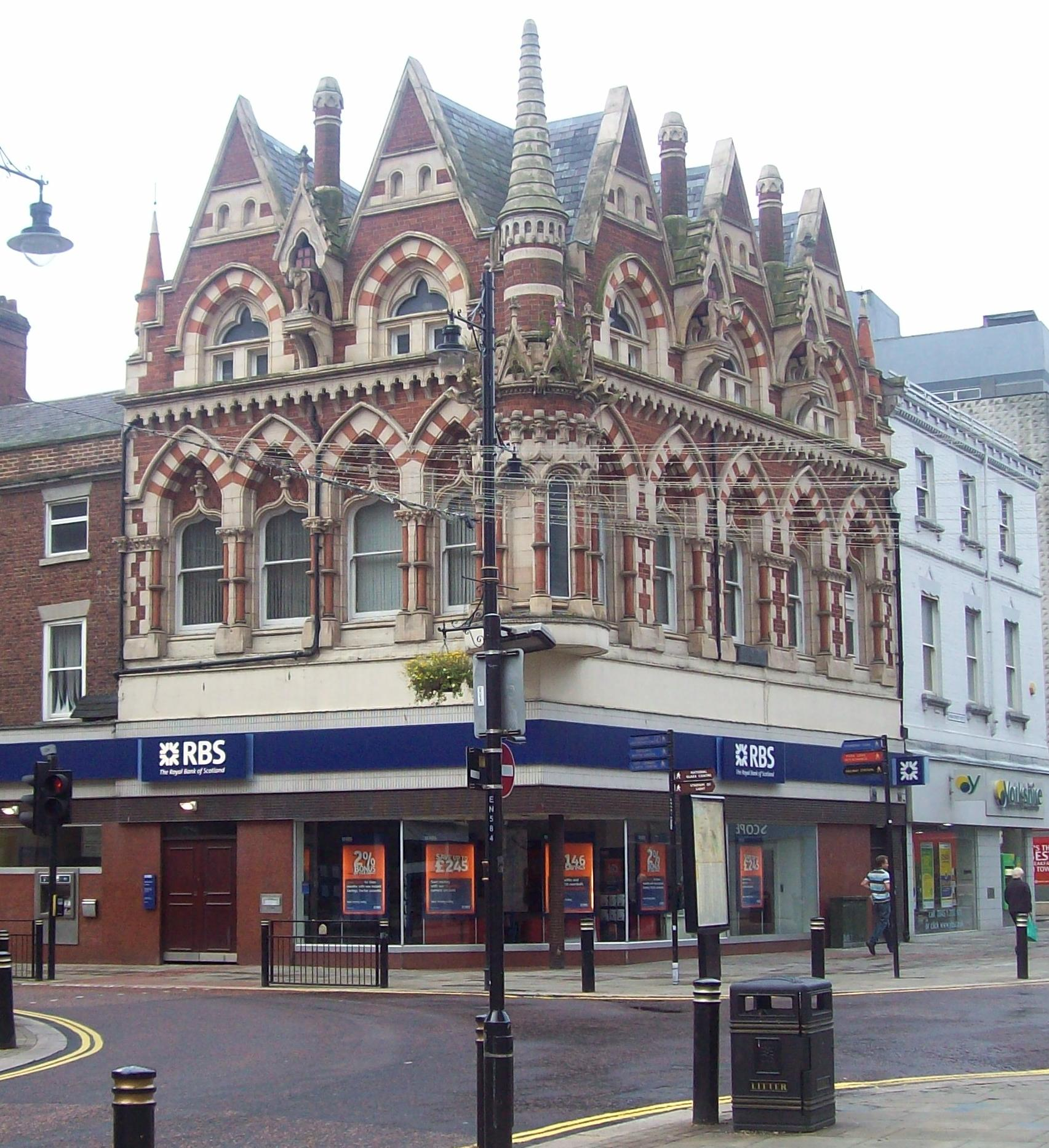
The Elephant Tea Rooms, Sunderland, one of Caws' grandest designs.

Francis Edward Caws (21 August 1846 – 8 April 1905) was an English architect.

Caws was born in Seaview, Isle of Wight. He was the son of Silas Harvey Caws and his wife, Emma Matilda (née Cave).

Caws married Catherine Francis Riddett of Ryde at St Helens Church Isle of Wight on 4 February 1868.

== His architectural activities ==
Caws was articled to Thomas Hellyer of Ryde Isle of Wight (1860–1864), following which he worked at South Kensington Museum, and returned to Thomas Hellyer as assistant 1864. He was assistant to John Ross of Darlington with North Eastern Railway Co., George Bidlake of Wolverhampton and senior assistant to Joseph Potts of Sunderland in 1867. Caws commenced independent practice in Sunderland 1870. Caws was elected Fellow of RIBA 5 June 1893.

His buildings in Sunderland include the Elephant Tea Rooms, Corder House, Sydenham House and the terraced Holmlands Park in Ashbrooke.

In 1874, a competition was held for Sunderland Town Hall on a site in Mowbray Park. The design the committee most liked was by Caws, but it was disqualified for exceeding the stated cost. The new design competition for a town hall on Fawcett Street took place. This competition was judged by Alfred Waterhouse and won by the little known architect Brightwen Binyon, who had worked in Waterhouse’s office. The competition were dogged by accusations of corruption, but the building was built.

Caws' other constructions include Seaview Pier, and New Dukes House, near Hexham.

== Other activities ==
As well as his architectural activities in Sunderland, Caws was also involved with social improvement in the area. In 1871 he was involved with establishing the YMCA in Sunderland and was their first honorary secretary until 1875. In 1887 Caws was awarded the contract for a new Sunderland YMCA building (which has long since vanished).

One story about Caws states that on a cold evening in the winter of 1901, he found a 9-year-old, barefoot and ragged match seller sheltering on the stairs of his office and decided to do something about it. Caws solicited support from his professional friends in Sunderland and the Waifs Rescue Agency & Street Vendor’s Club was formed as a charity with premises in Lambton Street. The doors were opened 2 January 1902 and Caws held the position of honorary secretary until his death in 1905. The Waifs Rescue Agency & Street Vendor’s Club was later renamed the Lambton Street Youth Centre and continues into the 21st century, claiming to be "one of the oldest youth centres in Europe".

== Death ==
Caws died the evening of 8 April 1905, aged 58, at his home in Sunderland following a trip to London during which he caught a chill and developed pneumonia. He is buried in Bishopwearmouth Cemetery.

== After death ==
After Caws' death, his name lived on in the title of the partnership Messrs Frank Caws, Steel and Caws of Sunderland, one partner being Caws' son, Francis Douglas Caws (1884 to 1951), the other partner being William Steele (born 1874). Their work included St Luke's Parish Hall, Wallsend built in 1909, and the Swan Hunter Memorial Hall, Wigham, opened in 1925 in memory of the men of Swan Hunter and Wigham Richardson Ltd. who died in the 1914–1918 war.
