= Seaview Chain Pier =

Pier near Ryde, Isle of Wight, England

Coordinates: 50.7177°N 1.1061°W

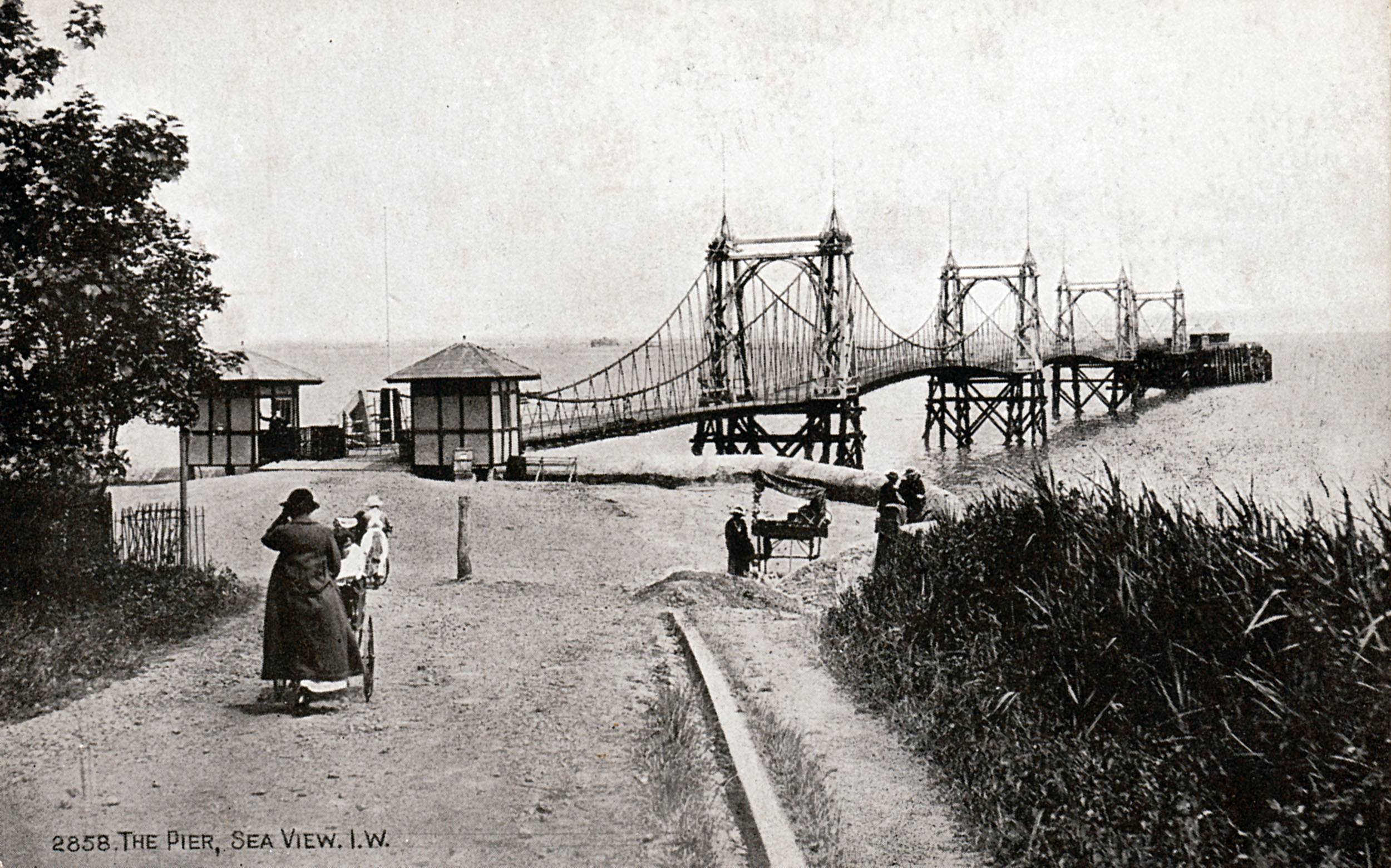
Seaview Chain Pier

Seaview Chain Pier was built in 1881 at Seaview, near Ryde on the Isle of Wight. The pier was designed by Frank Caws. Construction was from September 1879. The pier was opened in 1881 with finishing work completed in 1882. It was 1,000 foot (300 m) long and had a width of 15 foot (4.6 m). In 1889 the pier was extended to a length of 1,050 foot (320 m) as the result of work to better the landing stage. Traffic was disappointing and in 1901 the pier head was extended at a cost of £505 and amusements were added. Nevertheless 1900 was the last year in which the pier company managed to pay a dividend. In an attempt to improve matters the Seaview steam packet company was formed and began running a service between Seaview Chain Pier and South Parade Pier.

The pier was closed from 1915 during World War I, and in World War II it was commandeered by the Royal Navy. It was listed in 1948 but storms damaged it and it was demolished in 1952. It was one of only three chain piers in the British Isles.
