= Priory Bay =

Bay on the Isle of Wight, England

Coordinates: 50°42′33″N 1°06′04″W

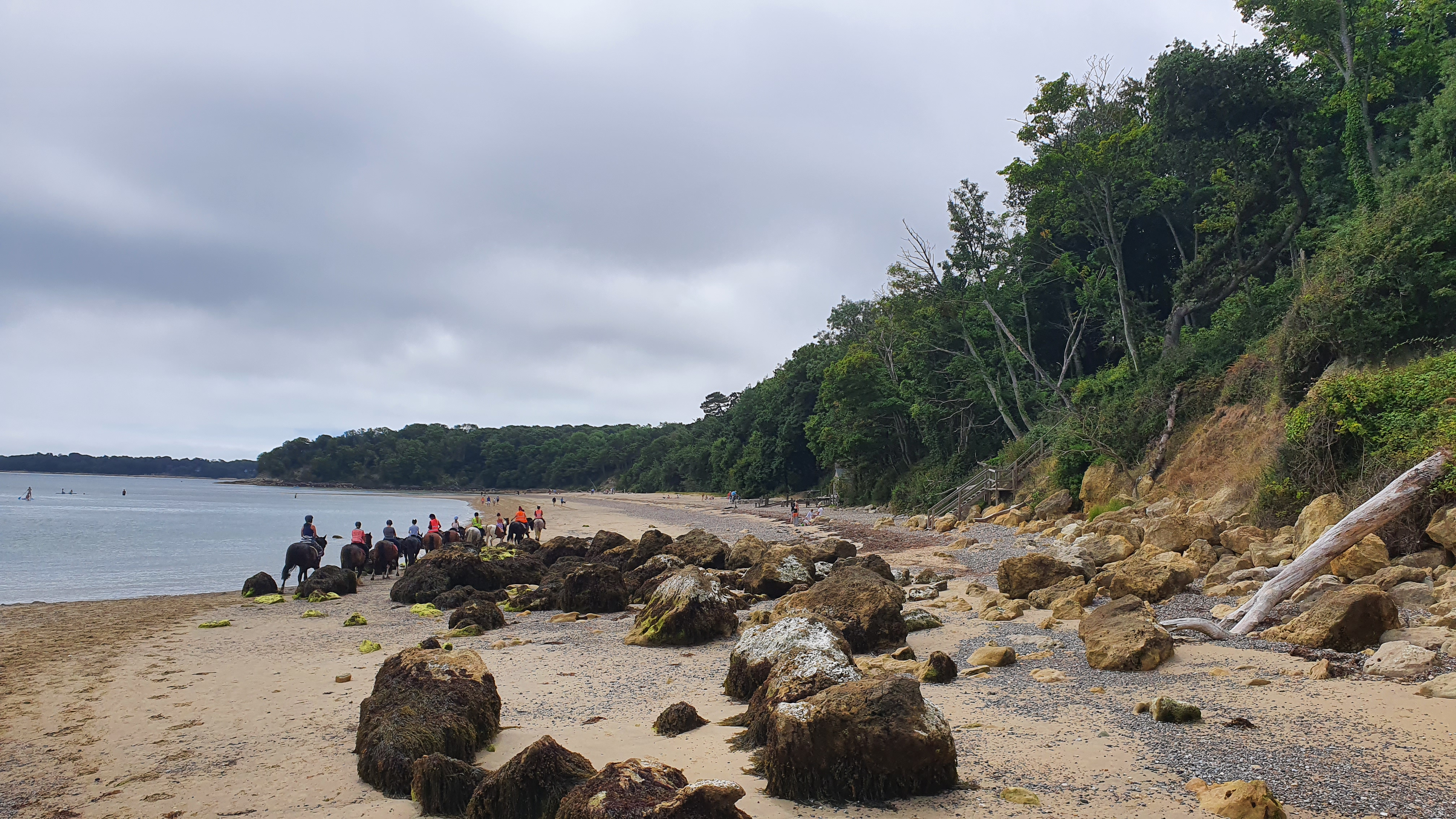
- Priory Bay looking south

- Location within the Isle of Wight
- Civil parish: St Helens
- Ceremonial county: Isle of Wight
- Region: South East
- Country: England
- Sovereign state: United Kingdom
- UK Parliament: Isle of Wight East

Priory Bay is a small privately owned bay on the northeast coast of the Isle of Wight, England. It lies 3/4 mile (1.2 km) to the east of Nettlestone village and another 3/4 mile along the coast from Seaview. It stretches from Horestone Point in the north to Nodes Point in the south, the bay is surrounded by woodland known as Priory Woods owned by the National Trust. The bay faces east towards Selsey Bill and has a 950-yard (870 m) shoreline and can be accessed by walking round Horestone Point from Seagrove Bay.

== Geography ==
The northern part of the bay has a straight coastline that makes a 700-yard (640 m) beach that is sandy with some pebbles. At the southern end the bay curves round to the east. Here the coast is rocky with evidence of walls and buttresses that were built to protect the coastline. These have largely been breached and lie scattered along the shore. The cliffs around the bay rise to around 130 feet (40 m) but are under 'active erosion' from the sea, particularly affecting the southern part of the bay.

The seabed is predominantly sandy and the shallow bay shelves gradually to the shore, a shallow sandbank called Gull Bank exists just offshore which keeps a long thin pool of water next to the beach at low tide.

== History ==
Palaeolithic tools, from the early Stone Age, have been discovered in the gravels on the beach of the bay, these tools have been washed down off the cliffs. Several hundred of these flint implements have been found on the bay since they were first discovered in 1886.

The bay takes its name from a small priory located nearby thought to be connected to monks from St Helens Old Church.

To the south of the bay is the Nodes Point Battery, which was used from the around the start of the 20th Century till 1956.
