= Alan Hersey Nature Reserve =

Nature reserve on the Isle of Wight

Coordinates: 50.718542°N 1.120048°W

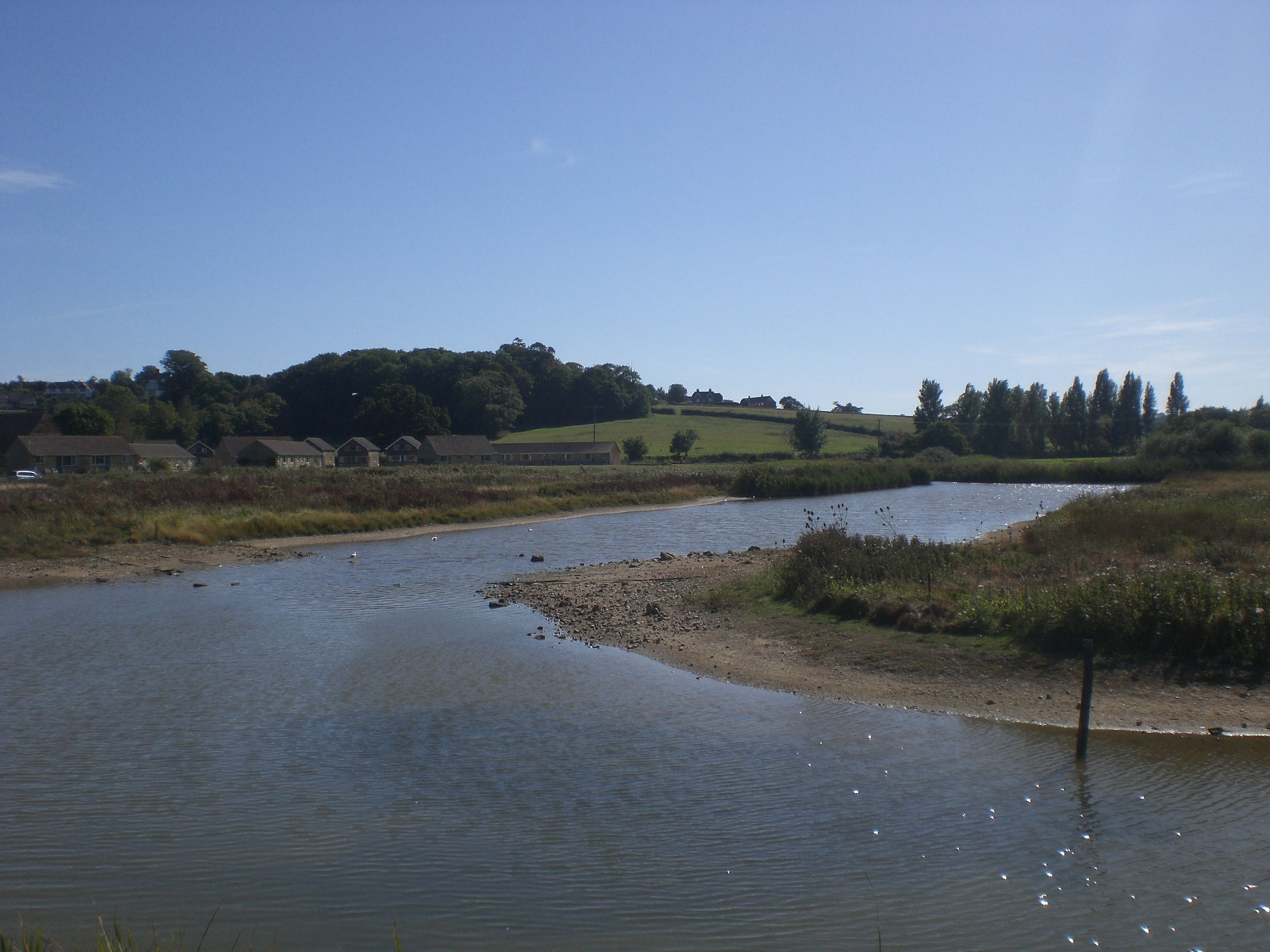
The central area of the nature reserve.

The Alan Hersey Nature Reserve is a nature reserve located on the north east coast of the Isle of Wight between Springvale and Seaview. On a flood plain, fluvial water runs down the valley into the reserve and a culvert passes under the old toll road and down the beach, through which salt water also enters the reserve on the rising tide. Water can only drain into the sea at low tide and as a result, a brackish lake has formed inland along with marshland and reedbeds. No dogs are allowed.

The Isle of Wight Council acquired 20 acres (81,000 m^{2}) and manage the site on a 50-year lease along with Natural England, the Environment Agency and local residents. Part of the site is developed for public access, there is a hide for bird watching and the reserve is noted both for its wading birds and wildfowl.

The reserve is named after Alan Hersey, a former parish, borough and county councillor who had a great interest in the history and environment of Seaview. The site is a Ramsar site and forms part of the Ryde Sands and Wootton Creek SSSI.
