= Seaview Wildlife Encounter =

Coordinates: 50°43′14″N 1°07′24″W

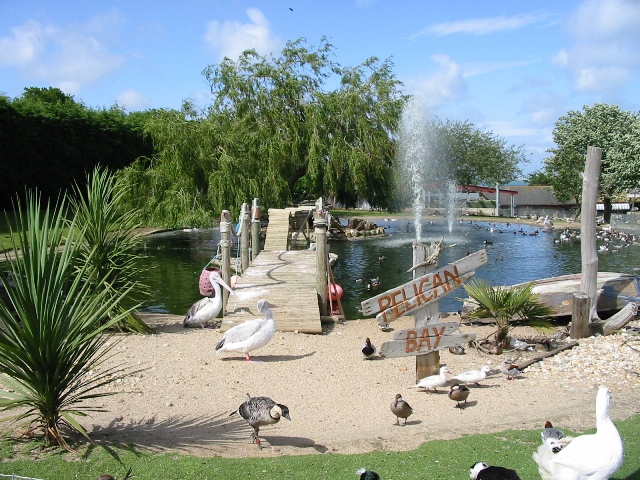
- Waterfowl gardens at Seaview Wildlife Encounter.
- Interactive map of Seaview Wildlife Encounter
- Date opened: 1971
- Date closed: November 2015
- Location: Seaview, Isle of Wight

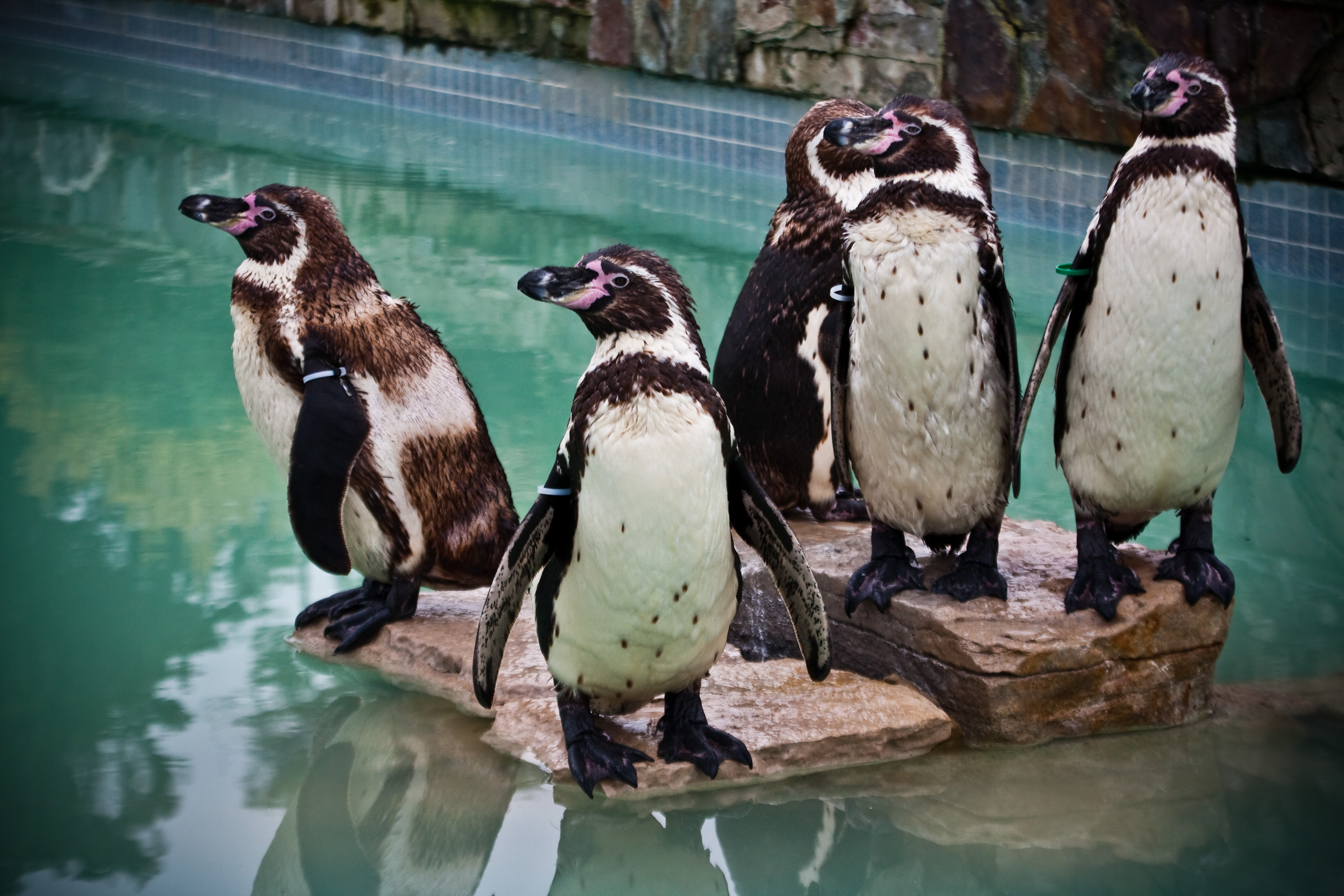
Humboldt Penguins (Spheniscus humboldti).

Seaview Wildlife Encounter, (formerly Flamingo Park), was a wildlife park featuring non-native species of birds and mammals. It opened in 1971 and closed in November 2015. The visitor attraction was located in the town of Seaview, on the northeast coast of the Isle of Wight. The Isle of Wight is a small British island 3 to 5 mi (5 to 8 km) off the coast of South East England.

== Features ==
Animals at the reserve included meerkats, wallabies, flamingos, pelicans, ducks, swans, alpacas, otters, penguins, and parakeets.

Visitors could feed the ducks and stroke the wallabies.

The site also included a gift shop and cafeteria.
