= Nettlestone =

Village on the Isle of Wight, England

Coordinates: 50.71139°N 1.11723°W

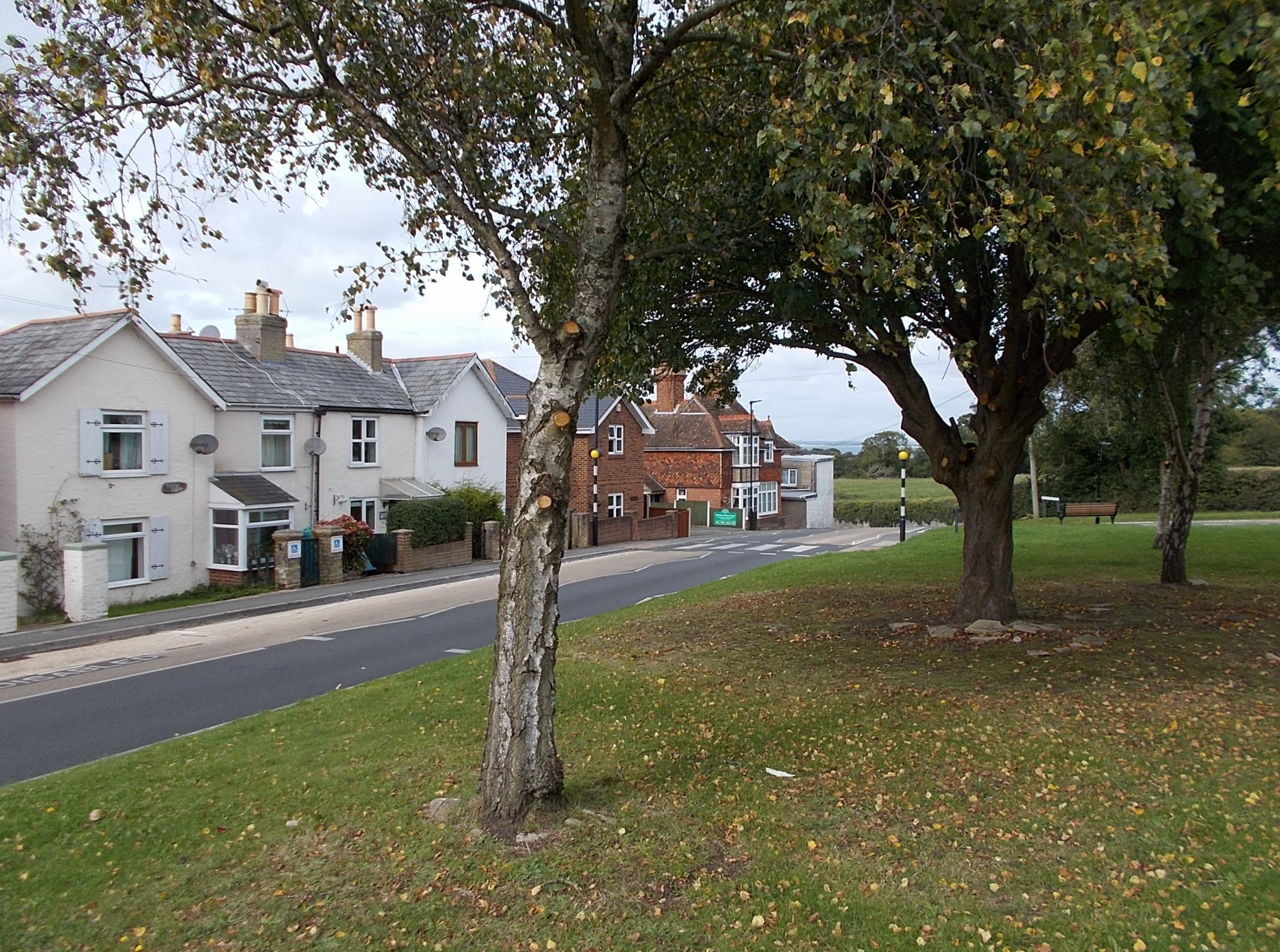

- Location within the Isle of Wight
- OS grid reference: SZ624905
- Civil parish: Nettlestone and Seaview
- Unitary authority: Isle of Wight
- Ceremonial county: Isle of Wight
- Region: South East
- Country: England
- Sovereign state: United Kingdom
- Police: Hampshire and Isle of Wight
- Fire: Hampshire and Isle of Wight
- Ambulance: Isle of Wight

Nettlestone is a village on the Isle of Wight, England, about 4 miles (6 km) south east from Ryde. It is recorded in the Domesday Book of 1086 as having been in existence in 1066. Together with Seaview, it forms the civil parish of Nettlestone and Seaview.

== Name ==
The name means 'the farmstead in or near the nut-tree pasture or wood', from Old English hnutu, lǣs or lēah (genitive case lēas) and tūn. By the 14th century, the first part of the name had evolved into nettle.

1086 (Domesday Book): Hoteleston(e), Hotelstone

1248: Nutelastone

1267: Nottlestone

1269: Notelestone

1352: Netleston

18th,19th and 20th centuries: Nettleston, Nettlestone Green

== History ==
In the Domesday Book, Nettlestone was recorded as Hoteleston and Hotelston(e), considered to be Nettlestone Farm and the village of Nettlestone, both held by King William.

Most houses in Nettlestone were built for workers and farmers.

The Priory Bay Hotel between Nettlestone & St Helens is said to be haunted by the ghost of a young lady who died there at the age of 14.

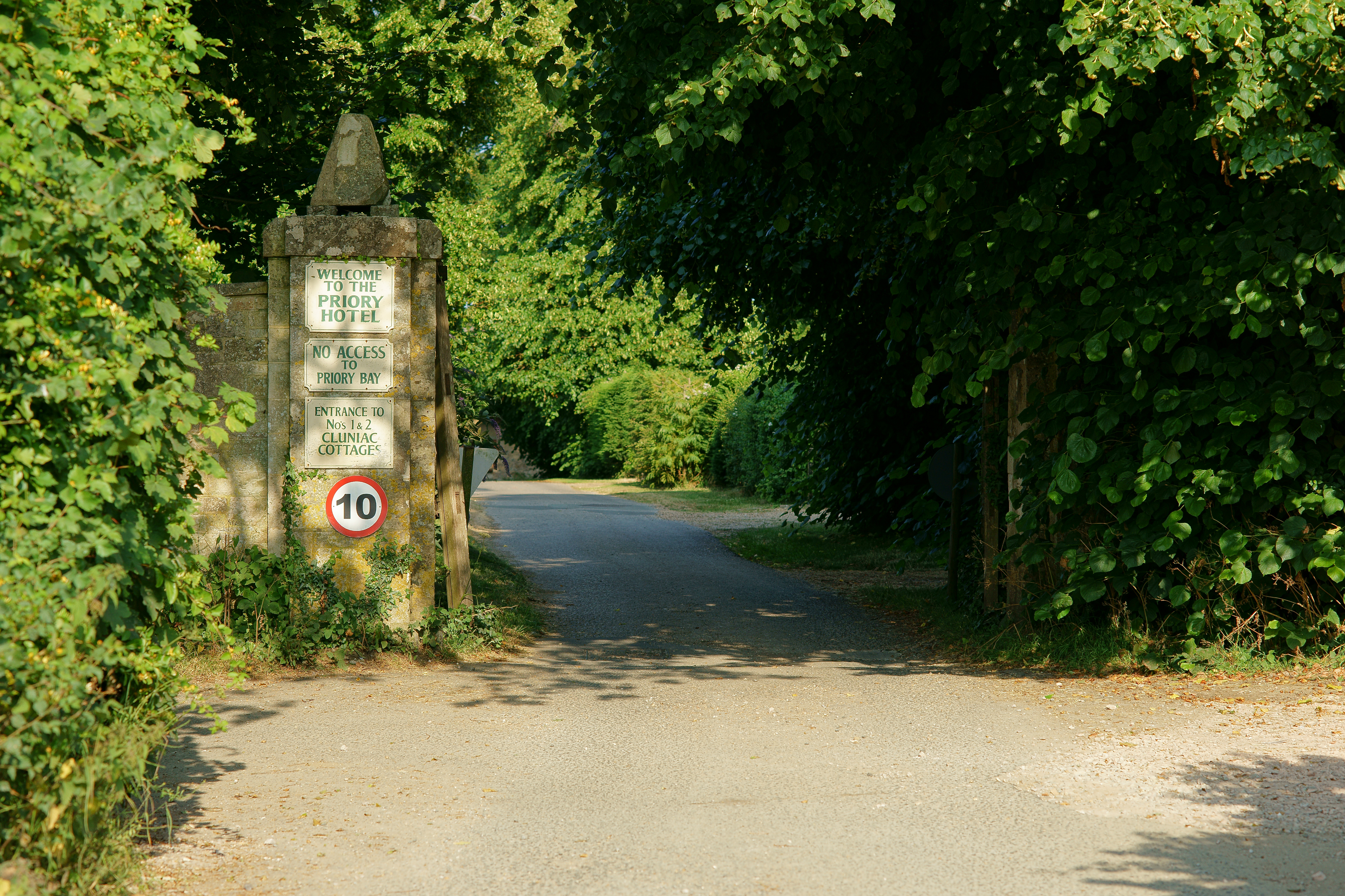
Entrance to the Priory Hotel

The local school is Nettlestone Primary which has taught local children since 1905. It moved to its current location in January 1906.

The village is home to the Bucks School Camp Association on Eddington Road.

Virginia Bottomley was elevated to the peerage as Baroness Bottomley of Nettlestone when she retired from the House of Commons in 2005.

=== World War II ===
There were 3.7 inch gun batteries at Nettlestone during World War II, under the 57th Heavy AA Regiment's 213th Battery, including the one at Whippingham, until June 1943. Afterwards, they were both under the 35th AA Brigade.

On 23 August 1940, 5 bombs were dropped by a German raider trying to escape 2 Spitfires on West Priory Cottages in Nettlestone, killing 2 people.

On 11 April 1941, Good Friday, 4 HE bombs fell between Nettlestone and St Helens.

On 29 April 1941, cottages in the village were evacuated when a fire broke out in a bedroom.

During March 1943, a combination of incendiary, high-explosive and phosphorus bombs were dropped on Nettlestone and Seaview.

On 15 August 1943, 3 Messerschmitts flying at around 7 miles (11 km) high were shot down, being watched by thousands of residents. Whether or not they were shot down from Nettlestone or Whippingham is unknown.

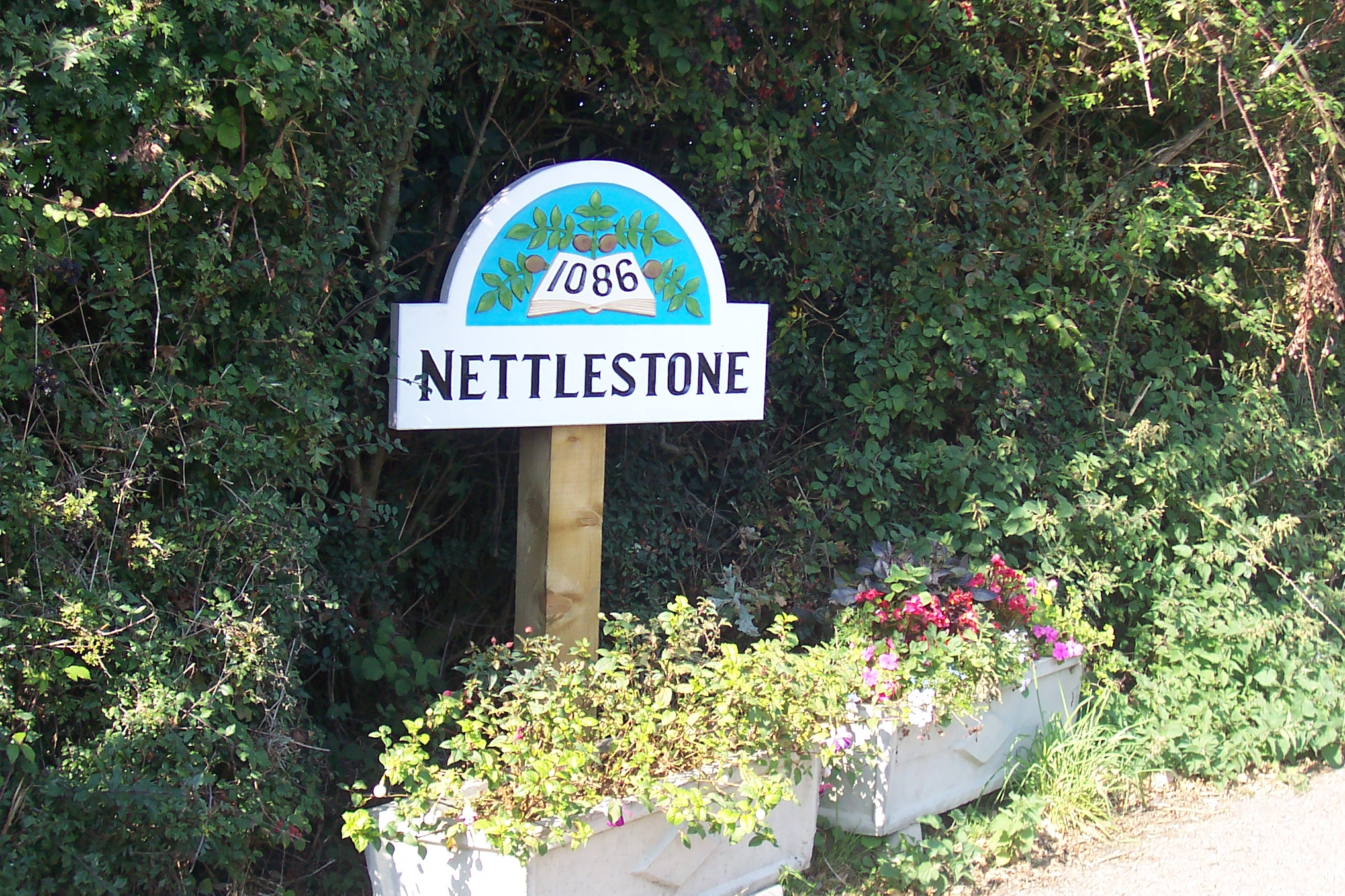
Sign seen on entering Nettlestone

== Transport ==
Public transport is provided by Southern Vectis bus route 8, which operates between Ryde and Newport via Seaview, Bembridge and Sandown including intermediate villages, once an hour from Ryde bus station.
