= Hersey & Son =

British jewellery company

Coordinates: 51.42904°N 0.33784°W

- Company type: Ltd
- Industry: Luxury goods
- Founded: Walton-on-Thames
- Headquarters: Hersham
- Website: www.hersey.co.uk

Hersey & Son is a company founded in Clerkenwell, England. The company is a noted firm of Silversmiths with a history dating back to 1955 when Michael Hersey started his apprenticeship and to 1971 when he and David Mills founded the firm.

== History ==
=== Mills & Hersey ===
Michael Hersey began an apprenticeship in 1954 aged 15 as a silver spinner at William Comyns & Sons Limited, in Soho, London. He later joined C.J. Vander Limited, which at the time was England's most preeminent Silversmith firm. Buying himself a spinning lathe, he later set up as a Silversmith under his own name, working from his garage at his home in New Malden, Surrey. As the business expanded, he moved the business to new workshop in Clerkenwell Green, London, home to many small silversmiths' workshops. In 1971 he joined with David Mills and opened a workshop in Clerkenwell. They supplied the retail jewellery trade with spun sterling silver items such as candlesticks, napkin rings and wine coasters. Continuing expansion of the business lead to their move in 1974 from Clerkenwell to Church Street, Twickenham, Middlesex and their first combined manufacturing premises and retail shop.

=== M C Hersey & Son ===
Michael's son Stewart joined the firm in 1981 after training as a silversmith at the Sir John Cass College, London Guildhall University and as an apprentice under Grant Macdonald. In 1983 David Mills left the company and in 1985 the firm changed its name to M C Hersey & Son and in 1987 the business moved once again to larger premises in Teddington, Middlesex. In 2016 Stewart became a Freeman of the Worshipful Company of Goldsmiths.

== Hersey today ==
Hersey's heritage includes the design and manufacture of Armada Dishes, often used as prizes in sporting events or to mark long-service or retirement from a company. In 2011 they were commissioned by the organisers of the Tranatlantic Race to provide trophies in three different sizes to be given for the winning and second and third placed yachts in each class. These were presented by the Princess Royal to the winning owners. In 2010 they made a unique Armada Dish for the Joint Assay Offices Committee for presentation to Richard Vanderpump its retiring chairman. As well as the usual leopard's head hallmark for London, it also bore the anchor hallmark for Birmingham, the Yorkshire rose for Sheffield and the castle for Scotland.

As the business has always been based in London, all the silver items they have produced have been assayed at the Assay Office in London, part of the Goldsmiths' Company. Between 1971 and 1983 their sponsor's mark, used in the hallmarking to indicate them as the manufacturer, was M&H and between 1983 and 2007 M over CH in a trefoil. Since 2007 their hallmark has been SH in a chamfered square.

In 2007 the company launched its web site to enable trade customers to place orders more easily. As jewellery shops closed down and the traditional Department Stores who had historically been large customers of the business moved into new product areas, personal shoppers began to use the web site to find silver gifts that were increasingly difficult to find in the High Street. Internet sales are now an important part of the business, directly through their own web site and through third parties such as NotOnTheHighStreet.

The company is a member of the National Association Of Jewellers.
