= Hersey Township =

Hersey Township may refer to the following places in the United States:

- Hersey Township, Michigan
- Hersey Township, Nobles County, Minnesota
