= Nettlestone and Seaview =

- Civil parish
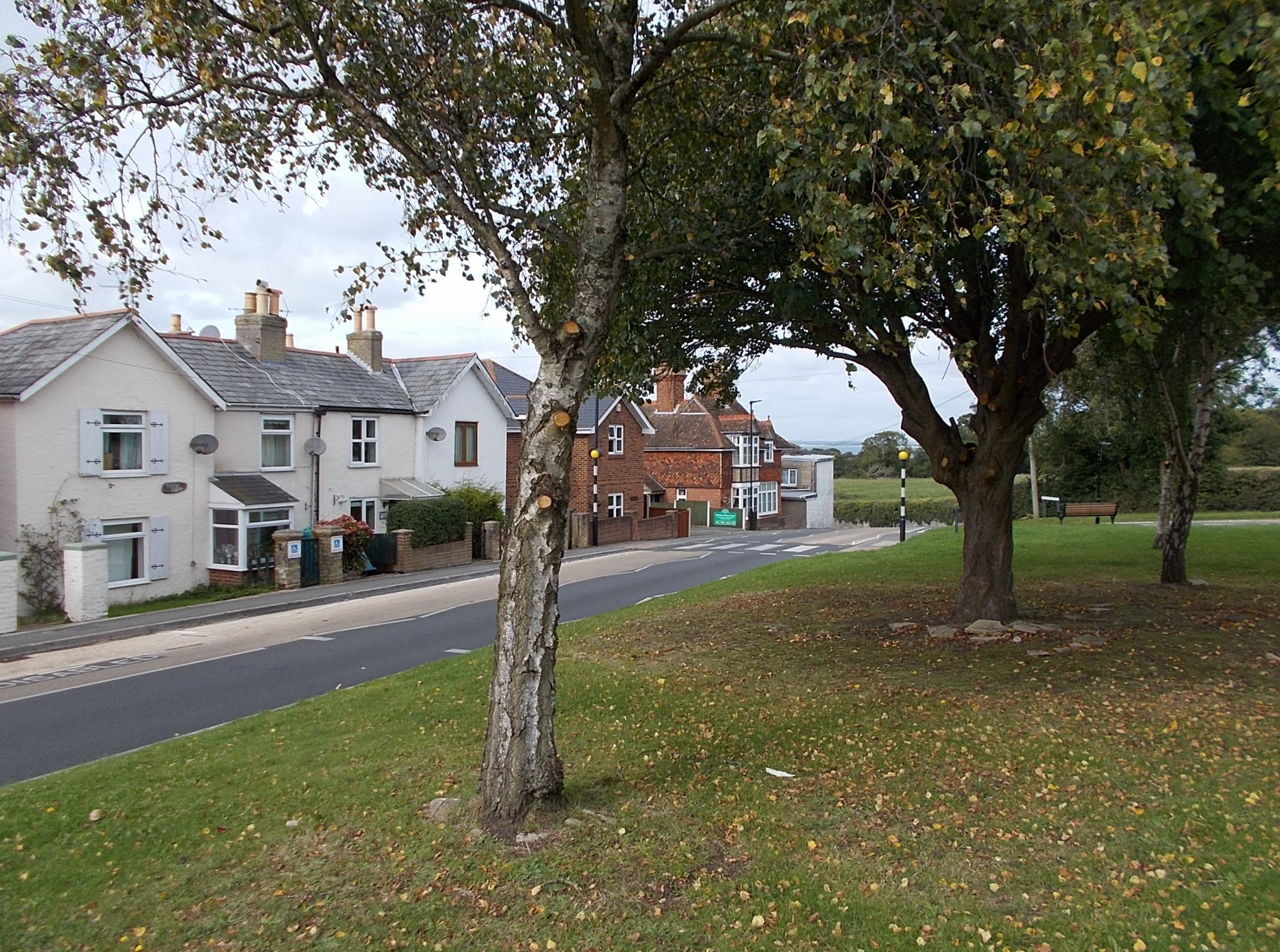
- Nettlestone
- Interactive map of Nettlestone and Seaview
- Coordinates: 50°42′55″N 1°06′49″W
- Country: England
- Primary council: Isle of Wight
- Status: Parish
- Main settlements: Nettlestone and Seaview

Area
  - Total: 5.3988 km^{2} (2.0845 sq mi)

Population
  - Total: 2,549
  - Density: 472.1/km^{2} (1,223/sq mi)

Nettlestone and Seaview is a civil parish and electoral ward on the Isle of Wight. It contains the villages of Nettlestone and Seaview.

Public Transport is provided by Southern Vectis bus route 8, which operates between Ryde, and Newport via Bembridge and Sandown.

== History ==
The parish was formed from the unparished area of Ryde on 1 April 1989 as "Seaview", the parish was then renamed to "Nettlestone and Seaview" on 15 May 1989.

== Freedom of the Parish ==
The following people and military units have received the Freedom of the Parish of Nettlestone and Seaview.

=== Individuals ===
- Roy Hayward: 14 November 2022.
