= Seaview, Isle of Wight =

Village on the Isle of Wight, England

Coordinates: 50°43′12″N 1°06′53″W

Seaview
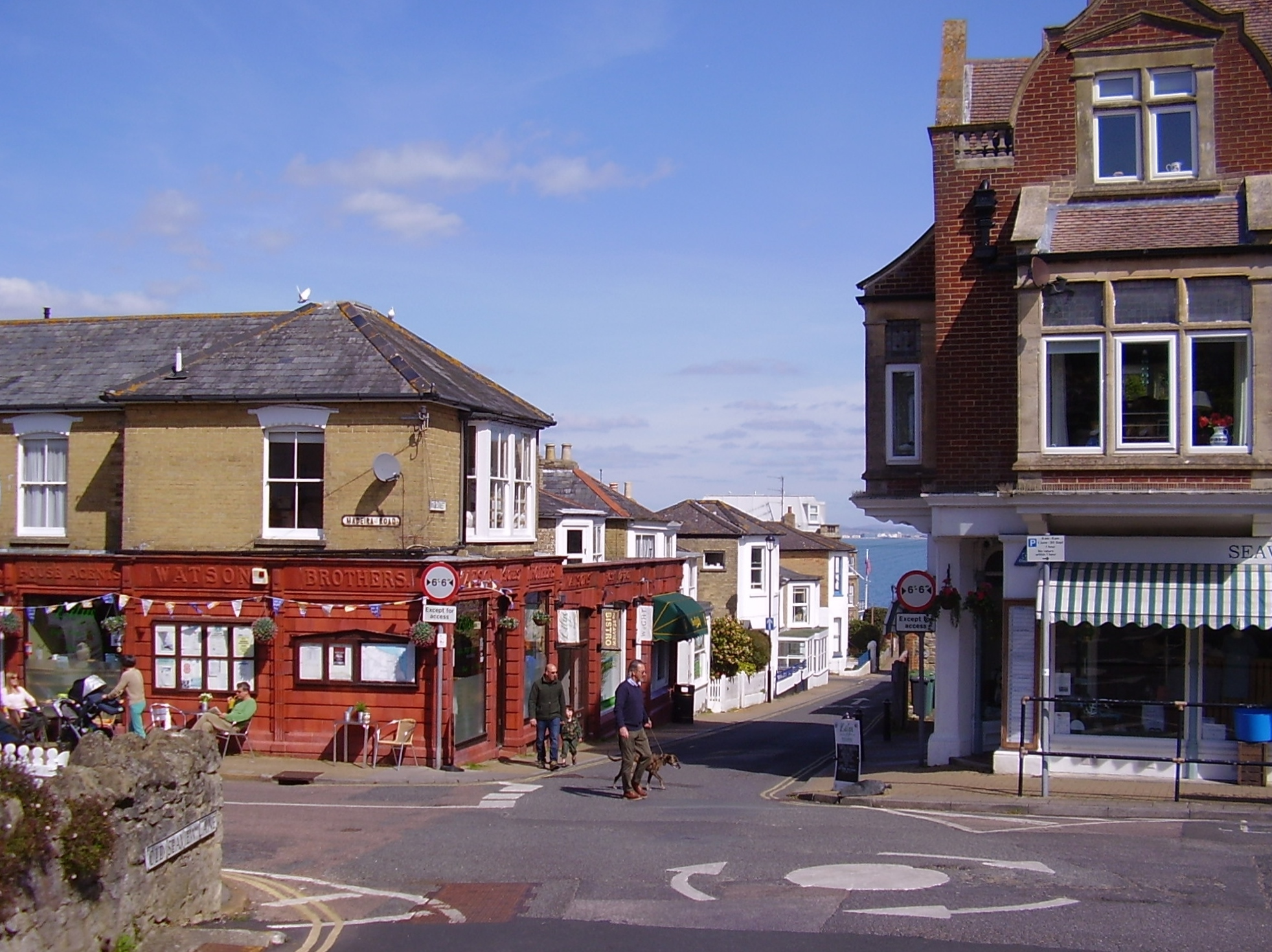
- Village centre, Seaview

- Location within the Isle of Wight
- OS grid reference: SZ625915
- Civil parish: Nettlestone and Seaview
- Unitary authority: Isle of Wight
- Ceremonial county: Isle of Wight
- Region: South East
- Country: England
- Sovereign state: United Kingdom
- Post town: SEAVIEW
- Postcode district: PO34
- Dialling code: 01983
- Police: Hampshire and Isle of Wight
- Fire: Hampshire and Isle of Wight
- Ambulance: Isle of Wight
- UK Parliament: Isle of Wight East

Seaview is a small Edwardian resort located on the north-eastern corner of the Isle of Wight, overlooking the Solent. The village is popular with tourists and is 2 1/3 miles (3.8 km) from the town of Ryde, where most tourists reach the island by ferry or hovercraft. Together with Nettlestone, it forms a civil parish of Nettlestone and Seaview.

== The village ==
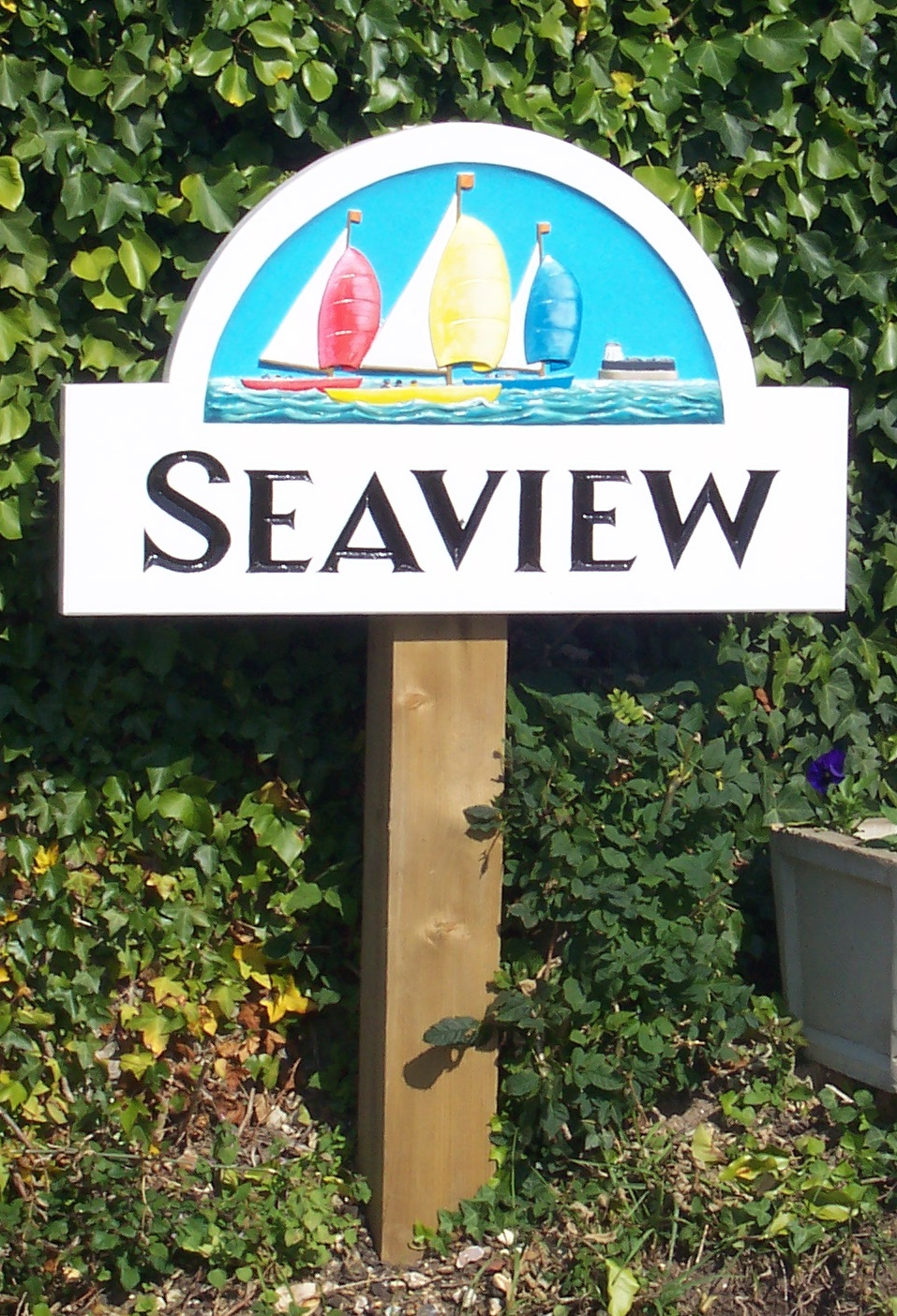
Sign one sees on entering Seaview

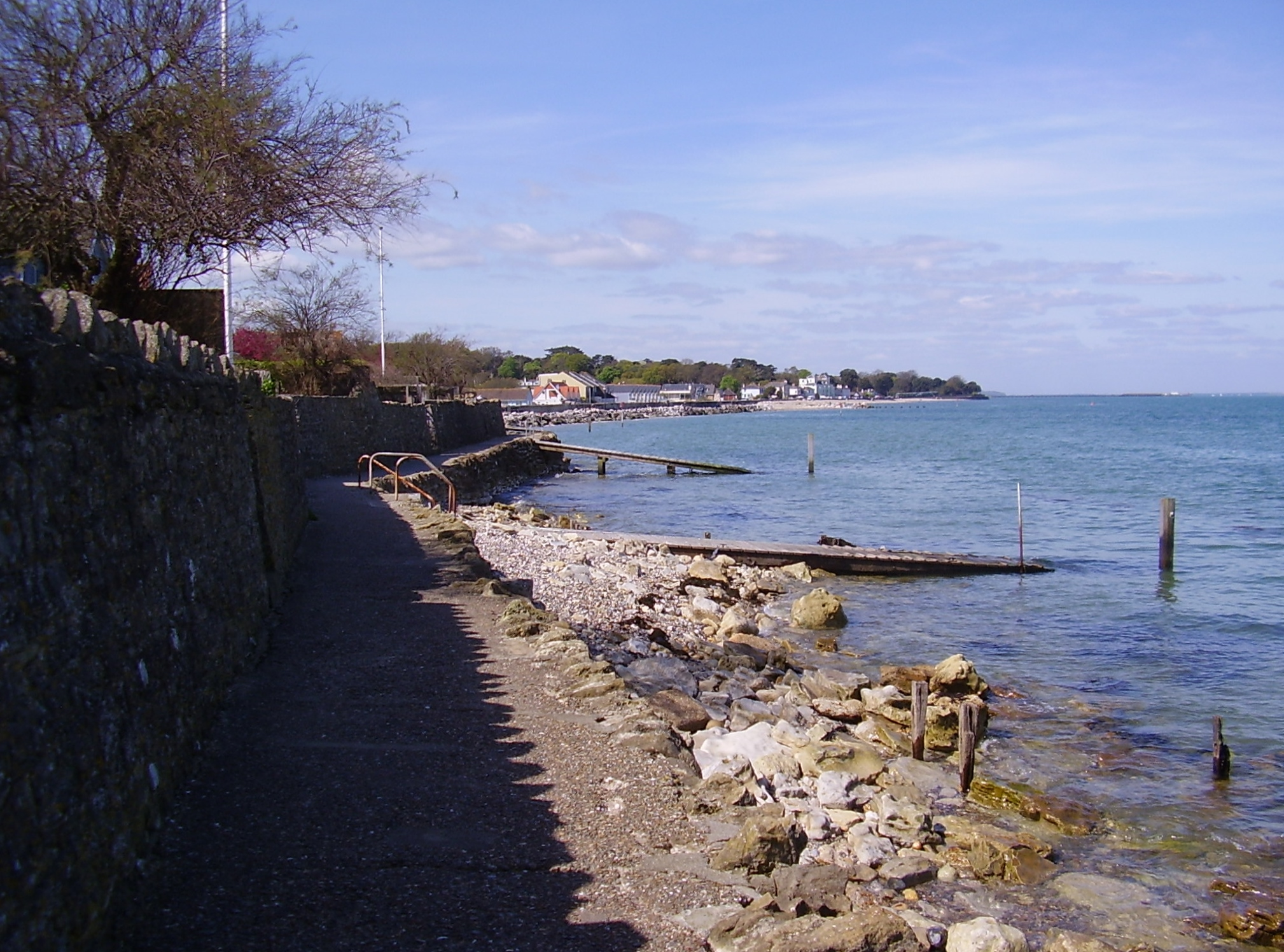
The seafront at Seaview, looking towards Ryde, with Ryde Pier visible in the far distance

The High Street is perpendicular to the shore. On the seafront lies the Old Fort pub, popular with both residents and summer visitors. The Salterns Cottages used to house salt pan workers. One street is named Rope Walk because long sections of rope for rigging ships were laid out there.

Priory Bay is approximately a ten-minute walk to the south of the village. This stretch of beach can only be reached at low tide. It is filled with white sand and offers excellent swimming conditions. In addition, Seagrove Bay, between the village and Priory Bay, is quite popular. Some of the largest houses in the area are along Pier Road and Bluett Avenue, and this is partly responsible for the nickname "millionaires avenues". Further large period houses, now largely divided into flats, can be found in Ryde Road.

In 1870, Augustus Gough-Calthorpe, 6th Baron Calthorpe, had a French Renaissance style house, Woodlands Vale, built by Samuel Sanders Teulon. The nearby Calthorpe Road is named after the family.

Seaview has many holiday homes including some with sea views. This leads to a seasonal variation in the activity in the village – with many second-home owners visiting only in the summer months or holiday periods. There are two hotels, the Seaview Hotel and the Northbank Hotel. There is a pub, cafés, shops, a post office and an art gallery.

No Man's Land Fort, formerly part of the coast defences and now a luxury residence, is visible in the Solent one mile from Seaview.

Public transport is available on Southern Vectis bus route 8, which operates between Ryde, Bembridge, Sandown and Newport.

St. Peter's Church the village's Church of England church built in 1859.

== Boating ==
The village is home to the Sea View Yacht Club, founded in 1893. In summer, the village hosts the Seaview Regatta, during which locals and tourists can take part in many traditional activities, such as the greasy pole where people line up and see how far they can slide along a pole covered in grease. Once they have slipped off, they drop into the sea below. There is also a diving competition and a firework display concludes the event each year.

== Seaview Pier ==
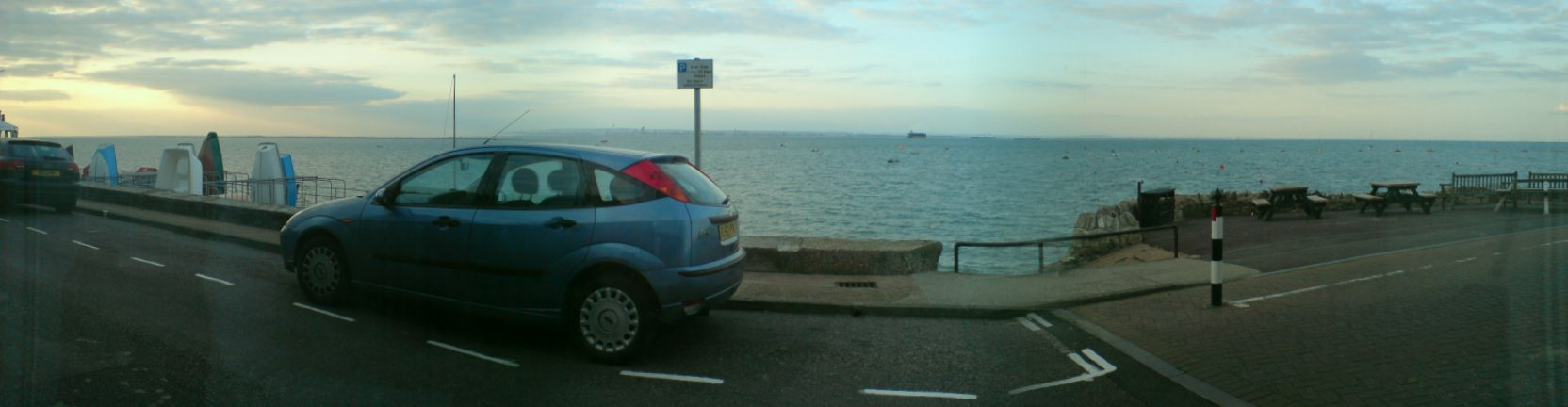
Panorama of the Solent as seen from Seaview

In 1877 the Seaview Pier Company was formed to build Seaview a promenading pier, and approval for a 350-yard-long pier was given by Parliament in 1878. The suspension pier was designed by Frank Caws, a Seaview-born engineer/architect then working in Sunderland. The pier was finished in 1881 and was 1000 foot-long and 15 feet wide; in 1889 it was extended another 50 feet. There were four towers from which the pier deck was suspended with chains.

In its heyday, the pier received passenger ferries from Portsmouth and other south-coast towns. At the entrance to the pier was the Pier Hotel, demolished in 1973.

The Pier was still in use after World War II and in August 1948 became the first pier 'listed' under the Town and Country Planning Act. However, it was severely damaged in a storm in late December 1951 (only leaving around 100 ft of promenade intact), and was demolished in 1952.
