= List of Sites of Special Scientific Interest on the Isle of Wight =

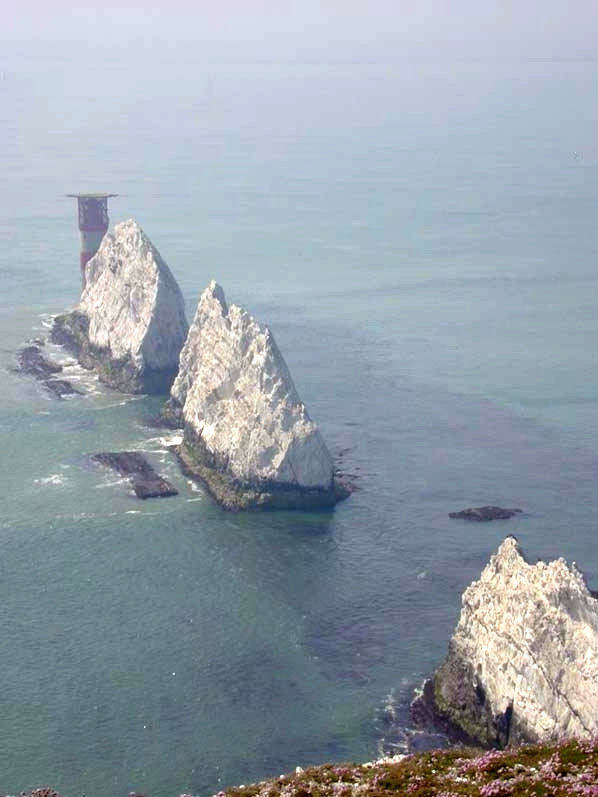
The Needles, part of Headon Warren And West High Down SSSI

This is a list of the Sites of Special Scientific Interest (SSSIs) on the Isle of Wight, England. The Isle of Wight is an island and county three miles off the south coast of England in the English Channel. Its geology is complex, with a chalk downland ridge running east to west through its centre and important fossil beds from the Lower Cretaceous to the Lower Tertiary around the coast. This geology gives rise to many distinct habitats, with strong maritime influences, including chalk grassland, neutral meadows, and broad-leaved woodland. The Isle of Wight has a population of 140,000, making it one of the country's smaller counties in terms of population.

In England, the body responsible for designating SSSIs is Natural England, which chooses a site because of its fauna, flora, geological or physiographical features. Natural England took over the role of designating and managing SSSIs from English Nature in October 2006, when it was formed from the amalgamation of English Nature, parts of the Countryside Agency, and the Rural Development Service. As of 2008, there are 41 sites designated in this Area of Search; of these, 26 have been designated for their biological interest, 4 for their geological interest, and 11 for both.

The data in the table is taken from citation sheets for each SSSI, available at their website.

== Sites ==
Site name	Reason for designation		Area^{[A]}		Grid reference^{[B]}	Year in which notified	Map^{[C]}
Site name	Biological interest	Geological interest	Hectares	Acres	Grid reference^{[B]}	Year in which notified	Map^{[C]}
Alverstone Marshes	✓		83.8	207.0	SZ572859	1951	Map
America Wood	✓		21.4	52.9	SZ567820	1986	Map
Arreton Down ^{[D]}	✓		29.8	73.6	SZ540872	1979	Map
Bembridge Down	✓	✓	56.3	139.0	SZ628856	1951	Map
Bembridge School And Cliffs		✓	12.6	31.1	ST647869	1999	Map
Bonchurch Landslips	✓	✓	28.2	69.7	SZ582785	1977	Map
Bouldnor And Hamstead Cliffs	✓	✓	95.7	236.4	SZ390910	1951	Map
Brading Marshes to St. Helen's Ledges	✓	✓	488.5	1,207.0	SZ635883	1951^{[E]}	Map
Briddlesford Copses	✓		167.2	413.2	SZ549904	2003	Map
Calbourne Down	✓		15.4	38.1	SZ429858	1989	Map
Colwell Bay		✓	13.6	34.2	SZ323873	1959	Map
Compton Chine to Steephill Cove	✓	✓	629.2	1,554.8	SZ489763	2003	Map
Compton Down	✓	✓	196.3	484.9	SZ365856	1951	Map
Cranmore	✓		12.4	30.7	SZ393901	2002	Map
Cridmore Bog	✓		14.4	35.6	SZ495815	1985	Map
Eaglehead and Bloodstone Copses	✓		10.3	25.5	SZ584877	1987	Map
Freshwater Marshes	✓		23.3	57.6	SZ344866	1951	Map
Garston's Down	✓		20.3	50.2	SZ475855	1971	Map
Greatwood And Cliff Copses	✓		16.3	40.3	SZ5680 – SZ5780	1986	Map
Headon Warren And West High Down	✓	✓	276.3	682.6	SZ316852	1951	Map
King's Quay Shore	✓	✓	97.2	240.1	SZ536935	1951	Map
Lacey's Farm Quarry		✓	0.1	0.3	SZ323862	1993	Map
Lake Allotments	✓		0.2	0.5	SZ586838	1988	Map
Locks Farm Meadow	✓		2.3	5.7	SZ449908	1988	Map
Medina Estuary	✓		100.5	248.3	SZ508924	1977	Map
Mottistone Down	✓		31.4	77.6	SZ414846	1971	Map
Newtown Harbour^{[F]}	✓		619.3	1,530.3	SZ425915	1951	Map
Northpark Copse	✓		9.9	24.5	SZ435885	1986	Map
Parkhurst Forest	✓		183.5	453.3	SZ473915	1986	Map
Priory Woods		✓	2.9	7.3	SZ635900	1998	Map
Prospect Quarry	✓	✓	4.3	10.6	SZ385866	1971	Map
Rew Down	✓		23.5	58.1	SZ550775	1977	Map
Rowridge Valley	✓		39.8	98.3	SZ454864	1951	Map
Ryde Sands and Wootton Creek	✓		424.4	1,048.7	SZ548920 – SZ634908	1993	Map
Shide Quarry	✓		4.8	11.8	SZ506881	1971	Map
St Lawrence Bank	✓		0.5	1.2	SZ536768	1998	Map
The Wilderness	✓		12.6	31.1	SZ505824	1951	Map
Thorness Bay^{[G]}	✓	✓	86.2	213.0	SZ455935	1966	Map
Ventnor Downs	✓		162.6	401.8	SZ575786	1951	Map
Whitecliff Bay And Bembridge Ledges	✓	✓	131.6	325.2	SZ657872	1955	Map
Yar Estuary	✓		132.4	327.2	SZ353886	1977	Map

== Notes ==
^{A} Data rounded to one decimal place.
^{B} Grid reference is based on the British national grid reference system, also known as OSGB36, and is the system used by the Ordnance Survey.
^{C} Link to maps using the Nature on the Map service provided by English Nature.
^{D} Arreton Down was originally notified as a geological SSSI, but was then renotified in 1987 for its biological interest only.
^{E} This site includes three former SSSIs known as St Helen’s Duver, Brading Marshes and St. Helen’s Ledges. They were notified in 1951, 1971 and 1977 respectively.
^{F} This also includes the former SSSI, Hart’s Farm Meadows which was designated in 1986.
^{G} This site was formerly known as Gurnard Ledge to Saltmead Ledge SSSI and was extended in 1987.
