= List of United Kingdom locations: Cre-Croc =

The United Kingdom

This is part of the list of United Kingdom locations: a gazetteer of place names in the United Kingdom showing each place's locality and geographical coordinates.

== Cr (continued) ==
=== Cre ===
Location	Locality	Coordinates (links to map & photo sources)	OS grid reference
Creacombe	Devon	50.95°N 03.69°W	SS8119
Creagan	Argyll and Bute	56.54°N 05.30°W	NM9744
Creagastrom	Western Isles	57.41°N 07.24°W	NF8548
Creag Ghoraidh	Western Isles	57.40°N 07.34°W	NF7948
Creag na Cuinneige	Perth and Kinross	56.75°N 03.58°W	NO0364
Creamore Bank	Shropshire	52.86°N 02.72°W	SJ5130
Crean	Cornwall	50.05°N 05.64°W	SW3924
Creaton	Northamptonshire	52.33°N 00.97°W	SP7071
Creca	Dumfries and Galloway	55.01°N 03.22°W	NY2270
Credenhill	Herefordshire	52.08°N 02.80°W	SO4543
Crediton	Devon	50.78°N 03.66°W	SS8300
Creebridge	Dumfries and Galloway	54.95°N 04.48°W	NX4165
Creech	Dorset	50.64°N 02.12°W	SY9183
Creech Bottom	Dorset	50.65°N 02.11°W	SY9284
Creech Heathfield	Somerset	51.02°N 03.04°W	ST2726
Creech St Michael	Somerset	51.01°N 03.04°W	ST2725
Creed	Cornwall	50.28°N 04.90°W	SW9347
Creadyknowe	Shetland Islands	60.36°N 01.00°W	HU5565
Creegbrawse	Cornwall	50.24°N 05.17°W	SW7443
Creekmoor	Poole	50.73°N 02.00°W	SZ0093
Creekmouth	Barking and Dagenham	51.50°N 00.08°E	TQ4581
Creeksea	Essex	51.62°N 00.78°E	TQ9396
Creeting Bottoms	Suffolk	52.17°N 01.08°E	TM1157
Creeting St Mary	Suffolk	52.16°N 01.05°E	TM0956
Creeton	Lincolnshire	52.75°N 00.50°W	TF0119
Creetown	Dumfries and Galloway	54.89°N 04.38°W	NX4758
Creggans	Argyll and Bute	56.17°N 05.09°W	NN0802
Cregneash	Isle of Man	54.06°N 04.78°W	SC1867
Cregrina	Powys	52.15°N 03.28°W	SO1252
Creich	Argyll and Bute	56.33°N 06.35°W	NM3124
Creigau	Monmouthshire	51.68°N 02.75°W	ST4899
Creighton	Staffordshire	52.92°N 01.88°W	SK0836
Creigiau	Cardiff	51.52°N 03.32°W	ST0881
Creinch	West Dunbartonshire	56.06°N 04.57°W	NS396886
Crelly	Cornwall	50.14°N 05.26°W	SW6732
Cremyll	Cornwall	50.35°N 04.18°W	SX4553
Crendell	Dorset	50.91°N 01.88°W	SU0813
Crepkill	Highland	57.44°N 06.30°W	NG4248
Creslow	Buckinghamshire	51.88°N 00.82°W	SP8121
Cressage	Shropshire	52.63°N 02.60°W	SJ5904
Cressbrook	Derbyshire	53.25°N 01.74°W	SK1773
Cresselly	Pembrokeshire	51.71°N 04.81°W	SN0606
Cressex	Buckinghamshire	51.61°N 00.78°W	SU8491
Cress Green	Gloucestershire	51.73°N 02.32°W	SO7804
Cressing	Essex	51.85°N 00.58°E	TL7820
Cresswell	Northumberland	55.23°N 01.54°W	NZ2993
Cresswell	Staffordshire	52.94°N 02.04°W	SJ9739
Creswell	Derbyshire	53.26°N 01.22°W	SK5274
Creswell (village)	Staffordshire	52.82°N 02.16°W	SJ8925
Creswell (suburb of Stafford)	Staffordshire	52.82°N 02.14°W	SJ9025
Creswell Green	Staffordshire	52.68°N 01.89°W	SK0710
Cretingham	Suffolk	52.19°N 01.24°E	TM2260
Crewe	Cheshire	53.09°N 02.44°W	SJ7055
Crewe-by-Farndon	Cheshire	53.07°N 02.86°W	SJ4253
Crewgarth	Cumbria	54.69°N 02.62°W	NY6034
Crewgreen	Powys	52.72°N 03.00°W	SJ3215
Crewkerne	Somerset	50.87°N 02.79°W	ST4409
Crews Hill	Enfield	51.67°N 00.10°W	TQ3199
Crew's Hole	City of Bristol	51.45°N 02.54°W	ST6273
Crewton	City of Derby	52.89°N 01.45°W	SK3733

=== Cri ===
Location	Locality	Coordinates (links to map & photo sources)	OS grid reference
Crianlarich	Stirling	56.39°N 04.62°W	NN3825
Cribbs Causeway	South Gloucestershire	51.51°N 02.62°W	ST5780
Cribden Side	Lancashire	53.71°N 02.31°W	SD7924
Cribyn	Ceredigion	52.13°N 04.16°W	SN5251
Criccieth	Gwynedd	52.91°N 04.23°W	SH5038
Crich	Derbyshire	53.08°N 01.47°W	SK3554
Crich Carr	Derbyshire	53.08°N 01.50°W	SK3354
Crichton	Midlothian	55.84°N 02.99°W	NT3862
Crick	Northamptonshire	52.34°N 01.14°W	SP5872
Crick	Monmouthshire	51.60°N 02.75°W	ST4890
Crickadarn	Powys	52.06°N 03.34°W	SO0842
Cricket Hill	Hampshire	51.33°N 00.82°W	SU8260
Cricket Malherbie	Somerset	50.89°N 02.91°W	ST3611
Cricket St Thomas	Somerset	50.86°N 02.89°W	ST3708
Crickham	Somerset	51.23°N 02.81°W	ST4349
Crickheath	Shropshire	52.79°N 03.05°W	SJ2922
Crickheath Wharf	Shropshire	52.80°N 03.05°W	SJ2923
Crickhowell	Powys	51.85°N 03.14°W	SO2118
Cricklade	Wiltshire	51.63°N 01.87°W	SU0993
Cricklewood	Brent	51.55°N 00.22°W	TQ2385
Crickmery	Shropshire	52.85°N 02.49°W	SJ6729
Crick's Green	Herefordshire	52.15°N 02.54°W	SO6351
Criddlestyle	Hampshire	50.92°N 01.78°W	SU1514
Cridling Stubbs	North Yorkshire	53.68°N 01.21°W	SE5221
Cridmore	Isle of Wight	50.63°N 01.30°W	SZ4982
Criech / Creich	Fife	56.37°N 03.10°W	NO3221
Crieff	Perth and Kinross	56.36°N 03.84°W	NN8621
Criftins	Shropshire	52.91°N 02.95°W	SJ3636
Criggan	Cornwall	50.40°N 04.80°W	SX0160
Criggion	Powys	52.72°N 03.05°W	SJ2915
Crigglestone	Wakefield	53.63°N 01.53°W	SE3115
Crimchard	Somerset	50.87°N 02.98°W	ST3109
Crimdon Park	Durham	54.72°N 01.25°W	NZ4837
Crimond	Aberdeenshire	57.59°N 01.91°W	NK0556
Crimonmogate	Aberdeenshire	57.61°N 01.93°W	NK0458
Crimp	Cornwall	50.90°N 04.49°W	SS2515
Crimplesham	Norfolk	52.60°N 00.42°E	TF6403
Crimscote	Warwickshire	52.12°N 01.66°W	SP2347
Crinan	Argyll and Bute	56.08°N 05.57°W	NR7894
Crinan Ferry	Argyll and Bute	56.07°N 05.55°W	NR7993
Crindau	City of Newport	51.59°N 02.99°W	ST3189
Crindledyke	North Lanarkshire	55.78°N 03.86°W	NS8356
Cringleford	Norfolk	52.59°N 01.23°E	TG1905
Cringles	Bradford	53.92°N 01.94°W	SE0448
Cringletie	Scottish Borders	55.68°N 03.22°W	NT2344
Crinow	Pembrokeshire	51.79°N 04.72°W	SN1214
Cripple Corner	Essex	51.97°N 00.69°E	TL8534
Cripplesease	Cornwall	50.17°N 05.50°W	SW5036
Cripplestyle	Dorset	50.90°N 01.87°W	SU0912
Cripp's Corner	East Sussex	50.96°N 00.51°E	TQ7721
Crist	Derbyshire	53.32°N 01.97°W	SK0281
Critchell's Green	Hampshire	51.03°N 01.58°W	SU2926
Critchill	Somerset	51.22°N 02.34°W	ST7647
Critchmere	Surrey	51.08°N 00.74°W	SU8833
Crit Hall	Kent	51.06°N 00.53°E	TQ7833
Crizeley	Herefordshire	51.98°N 02.81°W	SO4432

=== Cro ===
==== Croa-Croc ====
Location	Locality	Coordinates (links to map & photo sources)	OS grid reference
Croanford	Cornwall	50.50°N 04.77°W	SX0371
Croasdale	Cumbria	54.54°N 03.40°W	NY0917
Crockenhill	Kent	51.38°N 00.15°E	TQ5067
Crocker End	Oxfordshire	51.56°N 00.99°W	SU7086
Crockerhill	Hampshire	50.87°N 01.19°W	SU5709
Crockerhill	West Sussex	50.85°N 00.69°W	SU9207
Crockernwell	Devon	50.71°N 03.77°W	SX7592
Crockers	Devon	51.12°N 04.07°W	SS5538
Crocker's Ash	Herefordshire	51.84°N 02.68°W	SO5316
Crockerton	Wiltshire	51.17°N 02.20°W	ST8642
Crockerton Green	Wiltshire	51.17°N 02.20°W	ST8642
Crocketford or Ninemile Bar	Dumfries and Galloway	55.02°N 03.83°W	NX8372
Crockey Hill	York	53.90°N 01.05°W	SE6246
Crockham Heath	Berkshire	51.37°N 01.38°W	SU4364
Crockham Hill	Kent	51.23°N 00.06°E	TQ4450
Crockhurst Street	Kent	51.17°N 00.31°E	TQ6244
Crockleford Heath	Essex	51.89°N 00.96°E	TM0426
Crockleford Hill	Essex	51.89°N 00.94°E	TM0326
Crock Street	Somerset	50.91°N 02.96°W	ST3213
