= Smallbrook Manor =

Manor house in Isle of Wight, United Kingdom

Smallbrook Manor is a manor house on the Isle of Wight, lying at the north-eastern boundary of Newchurch parish. It doubtless took its name from the stream that here forms the boundary of the parish. It is of ancient origin, as in 1280 William de Smallbrook (Smalebrook) granted land to his son Hugh. It was held at the end of the 14th century by the Wyvill family, and remained in their possession until 1491–2, when Stephen Wyvill, the last of the family, sold it to Henry Howles. Smallbrook passed in the Howles family until the reign of Elizabeth, when it was divided between co-heirs and sold to Sir William Oglander. In the court held at Ashey Manor, 1 November 1624, Sir John Oglander was returned as a freeholder and free suitor of the manor for his farm called 'Smallbroke.' The estate has since descended with Nunwell and as of 1912 was held by Mr J. H. Oglander, who had the Court Rolls in his possession.
