= Scotlesford Manor =

Scotlesford Manor (also Scaldeford, 11th century; Scottesford, 13th century; Scotteford, 14th and 15th centuries) was a manor house in the parish of Brading on the Isle of Wight.

== History ==
The manor can only be identified now with the Scotchells Brook, which rises by Apse and flows into the Eastern Yar just to the east of Alverstone, and two fields called Scottescombe on the west side of Batts Copse to the west of Shanklin Manor. The holding has evidently been absorbed into the surrounding manors. Originally it was held as an alod of the Confessor by two thegns, Savord and Osgot. At the time of Domesday Savord's portion was held by the king; Osgot's by William and Gozelin, sons of Azor. By the 13th century it had become attached to the manor of Wolverton in Bembridge, with which it was held by Robert de Glamorgan. It seems to have passed with it until 1431, but by the 16th century had ceased to exist as an independent holding.
