= Whiteley Bank =

Coordinates: 50°37′59″N 1°13′15″W

Whiteley Bank: Whitely Bank
- Hamlet
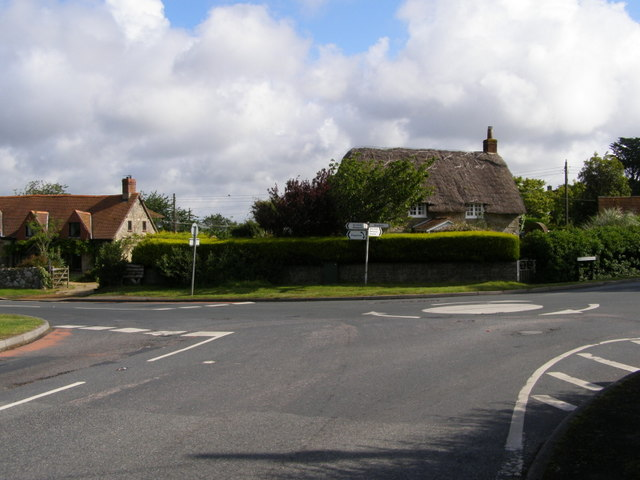
- The crossroads at Whiteley Bank

- Location within the Isle of Wight
- OS grid reference: SZ5512881570
- Civil parish: Newchurch; Godshill; Wroxall
- Unitary authority: Isle of Wight
- Ceremonial county: Isle of Wight
- Region: South East
- Country: England
- Sovereign state: United Kingdom
- Police: Hampshire and Isle of Wight
- Fire: Hampshire and Isle of Wight
- Ambulance: Isle of Wight

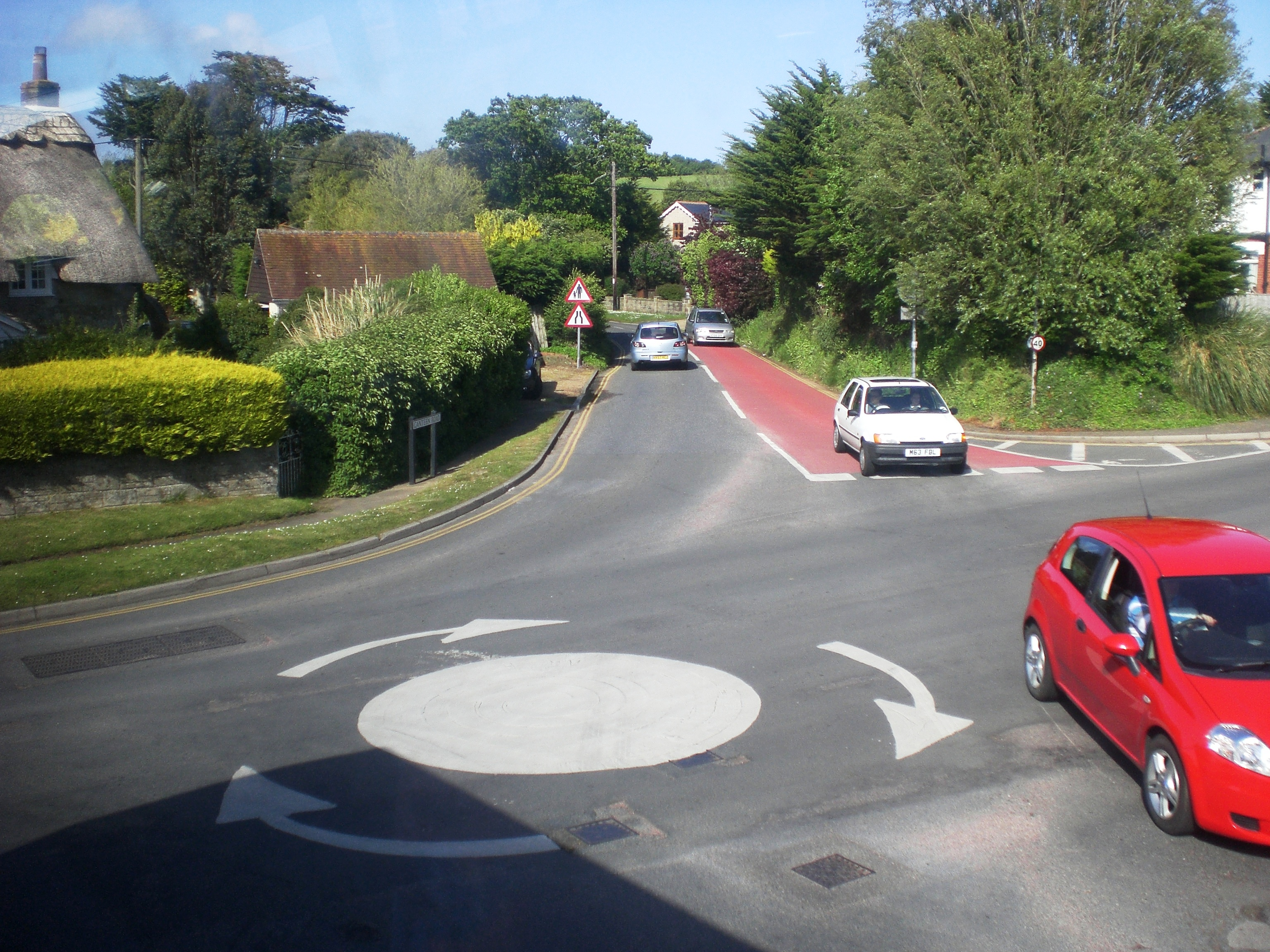
The Whiteley Bank crossroads.

Whiteley Bank, also spelled "Whitely Bank", is a small village or hamlet in the civil parish of Newchurch, on the Isle of Wight, England. It is located two miles west of Shanklin and five and a half miles (8.9 km) south-east of Newport. It is mainly known by the crossroads, now styled as a mini-roundabout, between the A3020, B3327 and Canteen Road to Apse Heath.

== Name ==
The name means 'the bank at the white clearing or pasture', from Old English hwīt and lēah with Middle English banke.

1759: Whiteley Bank

1769: Whetely Bank

Canteen Road, a road going north of the crossroads, was named from the canteen of a German foreign legion who camped at Princelett Farm, Princelett. A story claims the legion was aggressive and the locals lived in fear of them.

== Nature ==
Whiteley Bank is the home of the Isle of Wight Donkey Sanctuary. The Donkey Sanctuary was established in 1987 to provide a safe home for donkeys in distress. It currently houses about 200 animals. It was originally in Newport but had to be moved to Whiteley Bank to accommodate more animals. America Wood is a SSSI located between Whiteley Bank and Shanklin.

It was also home to the infamous "One Acre Festival", which saw crowds of no less than 30 people in an acre field, appreciating the islands local bands.

On 4 February 2026, a man climbed a tree to escape an "angry cow" in Whiteley Bank. Fire crews were called.

== Transport ==
It is served by Southern Vectis buses on routes 2 and 3. There used to be a public telephone. Whiteley Bank House is a nursing home in Whiteley Bank.
