= Langbridge Manor =

Manor house in Isle of Wight, United Kingdom

Langbridge Manor (also Longebrugge and Langebrigge) is a manor house on the Isle of Wight, situated within the Newchurch parish. It was historically linked with Ashey Manor.

== History ==
It was held of the manor of Ashey, and presumably took its name from an early bridge over the Yar on the site of the present one. It was probably granted to the abbey of Wherwell with Ashey, and the manor and church of Langbridge, with an annual pension of half a mark payable to the parish church of Newchurch, was confirmed to the Abbess of Wherwell in 1228 by Pope Gregory. It followed the descent of Ashey, and at a court of that manor held by Thomas Cotele in 1624 Thomas Lovinge is returned as holding Langbridge. As of 1912 it was the property of Mr. Edward Carter, who purchased it in 1906.
