= Ryde Manor =

Manor house in Isle of Wight, United Kingdom

Ryde Manor (also La Rye, le Rythe, Ride) is a manor house in Ryde on the Isle of Wight, situated within the Newchurch parish. It was historically linked with Ashey Manor.

== History ==
Ryde was parcel of Ashey Manor, and seems to have formed the portion of John the youngest son of Giles Worsley. Ryde Manor was awarded to Sir Robert Worsley in 1563, and in 1565 he sold to Anthony Dillington an estate which at the time of the death of Anthony's son Sir Robert Dillington in 1604 is called 'the manors of Ashley and Ryde.' Sir Robert was succeeded by his nephew Robert, and with the Dillington family the manor remained till Sir John Dillington in 1705 sold it to Henry Player of Alverstoke. The Player family seem to have held courts unchallenged by the Edgcumbes. Considerable friction arose between the Bettesworths and the Players as to shore rights, which in 1811 were adjudged to belong to Mrs. Bettesworth. By the middle of the century the Players, who seem from the first to have attempted encroachments on the manorial rights of Ashey, had acquired that manor, which since 1588 had always been called in Court Rolls the manor of Ashey and Ryde. Thus the ancient manor was again united under one owner. The lord of the manor of Ashey and Ryde, William Player Brigstocke, lived at Ryde House as of 1912.
