= Bigbury Manor =

- Former names: Bikeberye
- Alternative names: Bydeborough

General information
- Type: Manor house
- Location: Isle of Wight, United Kingdom

Bigbury Manor (also Bikeberye, Bydeborough, or Bidborowe) is a small manor house on the Isle of Wight within the Newchurch parish. It is a small holding to the north of Apse Heath, was confirmed to Quarr Abbey by Isabel de Fortibus, and remained in the possession of the abbey until the Dissolution of the monasteries, when it passed to the Crown. It was granted in 1610 to Lionel Cranfield (who surrendered it the following year). In 1631, Basil Nicoll and others obtained a grant of the messuage or grange of Bidborowe.
