= Cridmore =

Hamlet on Isle of Wight, England

Coordinates: 50.638°N 1.296°W

- Hamlet
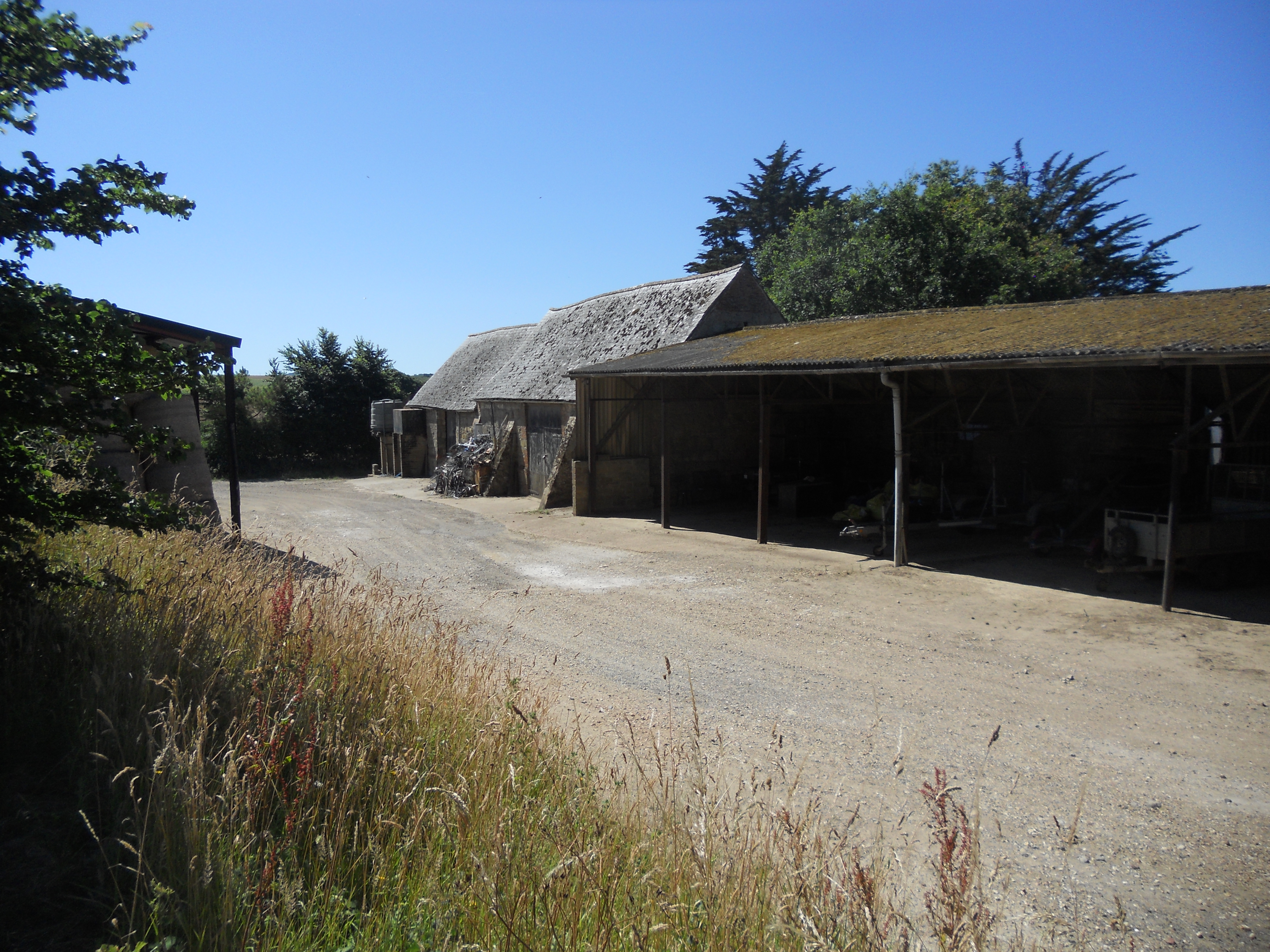
- Cridmore Farm

- Location within the Isle of Wight
- Civil parish: Chillerton and Gatcombe
- Unitary authority: Isle of Wight
- Ceremonial county: Isle of Wight
- Region: South East
- Country: England
- Sovereign state: United Kingdom
- Post town: NEWPORT
- Postcode district: PO30
- Police: Hampshire and Isle of Wight
- Fire: Hampshire and Isle of Wight
- Ambulance: Isle of Wight
- UK Parliament: Isle of Wight West

Cridmore is a hamlet on the Isle of Wight, in the civil parish of Chillerton and Gatcombe and the ward of Central Rural, about 5.5 miles (8.9 km) south of Newport. It is the location of the Cridmore Bog, a Site of Special Scientific Interest (SSSI) in unfavourable condition, notified in 1985. The neighbouring hamlet is Roslin.

== Name ==
Its name means 'the marshy ground overgrown by weeds or other vegetation', from Old English crȳde and mōr, referring to the Cridmore Bog.

~1286: Cruddemore

1299: Crudmore

1305: Crodemor

1337: Crudemore

1708: Cridmore

18th and 19th centuries: Cridmore

== History ==
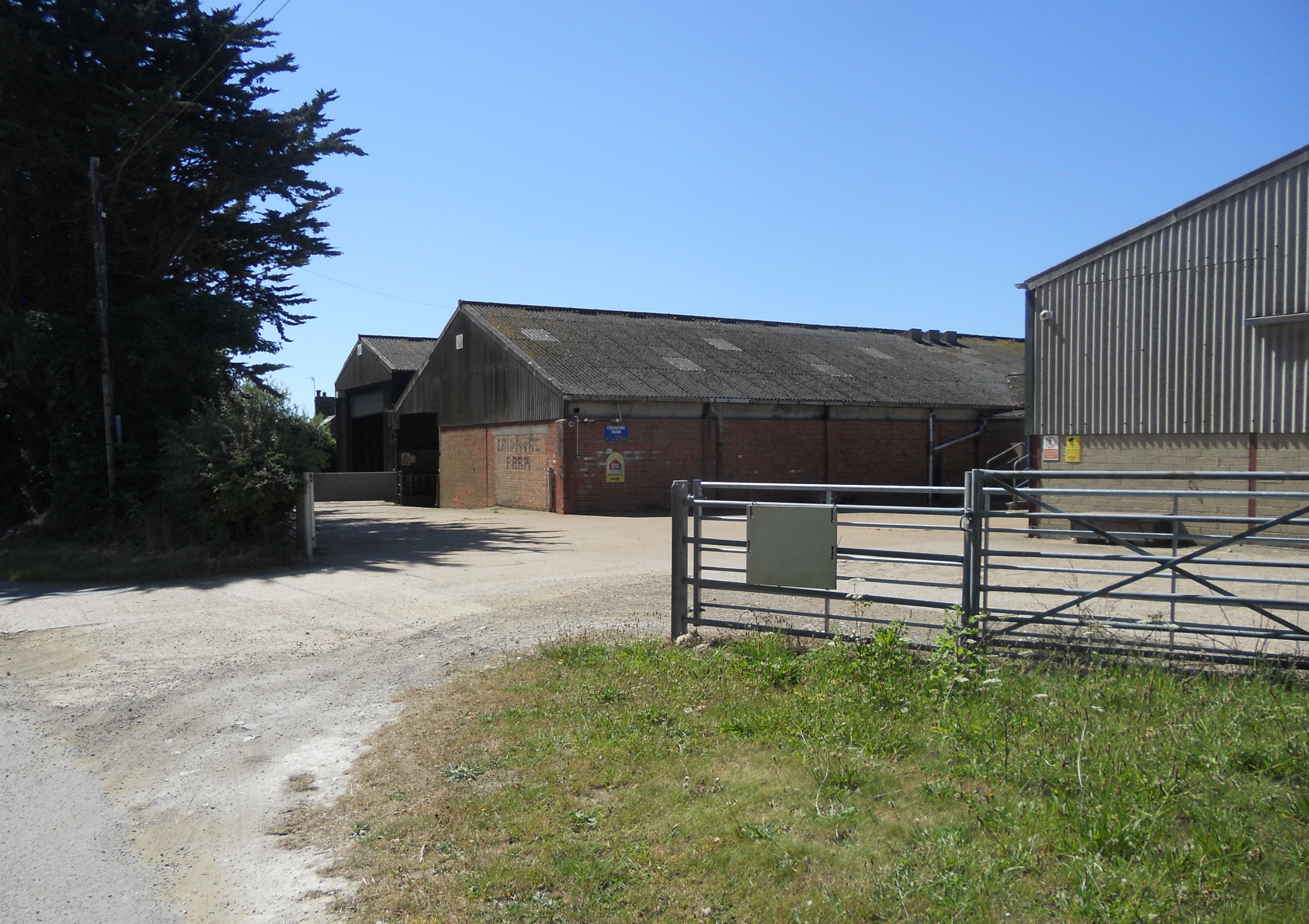
The entrance to Cridmore Farm

On 10 August 1940, four bombs went off in a neigbouring SSSI, The Wilderness, damaging windows at Cridmore Farm.

=== Cridmore Farm ===
The farm is owned by the Clarke family, now in their 4th generation of farming. They have a beef herd of ~50 cows who graze on the marshlands during summer and calve during spring. It has ~1,000 acres (400 ha) of land for combinable crops, such as wheat, oilseed rape, beans and oats.

==== Building refurbishments and improvements ====
In 1962, the farm buildings were improved, for example an upgrade to the dairy using bricks from the brickworks at Rookley. The Barn Store, built in 1983, expanded in 1990 and originally used for housing cattle has been refurbished into a storage facility, managed by Nick and Lizzie Ward.

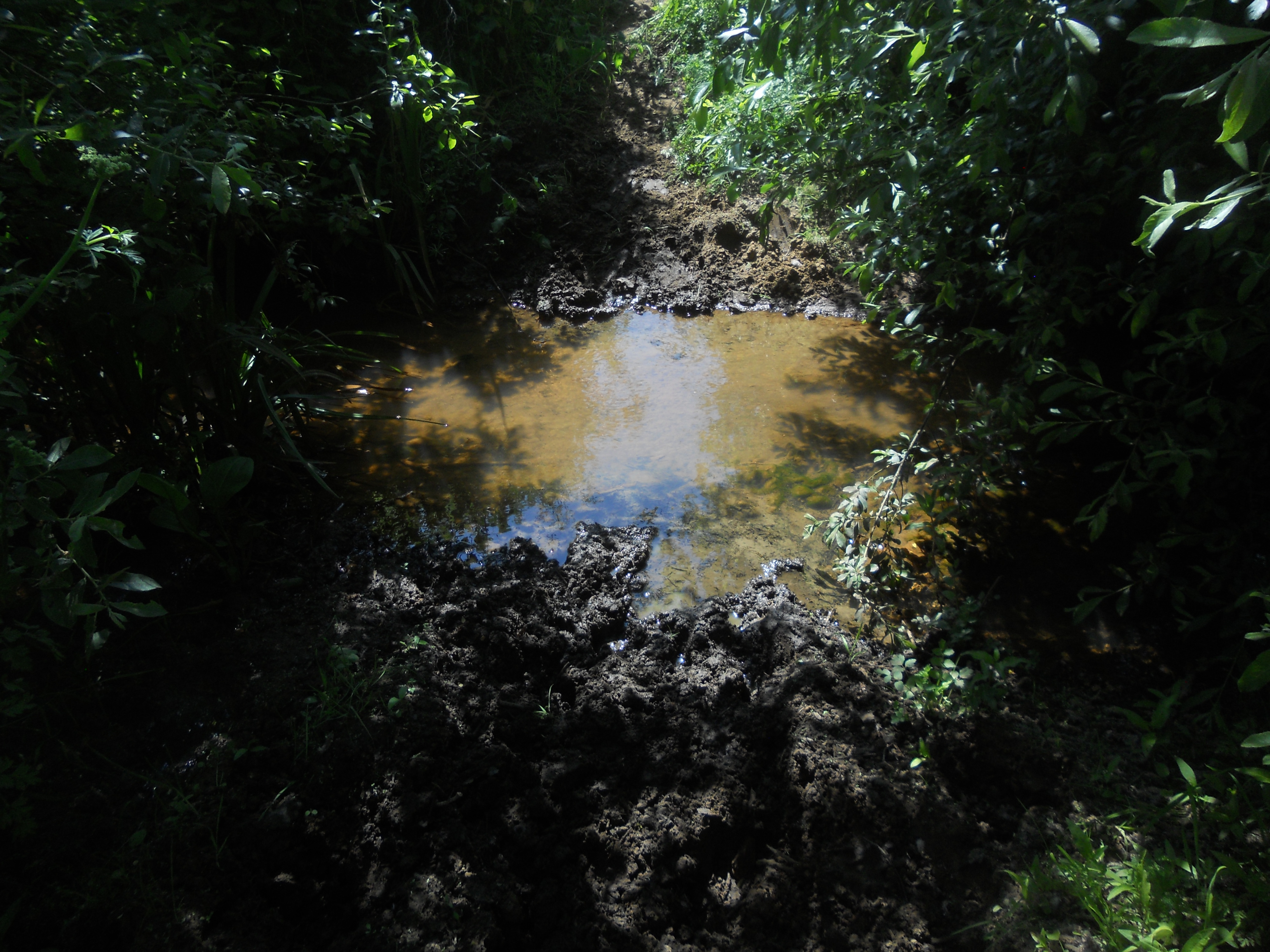
The River Medina at the Cridmore Bog

== Cridmore Bog ==
The Cridmore Bog is an SSSI notified in 1985 situated in a flat valley bottom with deep acid peat and marshy grassland, which the River Medina flows through. It makes up one of the largest wet acid peatland habitats on the Isle of Wight, with plant species uncommon in other parts of the Island. It is able to support plants like Blue Cornflowers (Centuarea cyanus) and Yellow Corn Marigolds (Glebionis segetum) It is in unfavourable condition, along with two other sites: Alverstone Marshes and Thorness Bay. Cows graze on the site during summer.
