= Lower Croan =

Coordinates: 50.510°N 4.790°W

Lower Croan: Cornish: Crowyn goles
- Location within Cornwall
- OS grid reference: SX023715
- Civil parish: Egloshayle
- Unitary authority: Cornwall
- Ceremonial county: Cornwall
- Region: South West
- Country: England
- Sovereign state: United Kingdom

Lower Croan (Cornish: Crowyn goles, meaning lower little hut) is a farmstead in Cornwall, England, UK. It is in the parish of Egloshayle and Croan house (a quarter of a mile) and Croanford (half a mile) are to the east. Croan House is a manor house of two storeys and seven bays which was built in the 1690s for a prosperous attorney.
