= Alverstone Mead =

Nature reserve on the Isle of Wight, England

Coordinates: 50°39′56″N 1°10′54″W

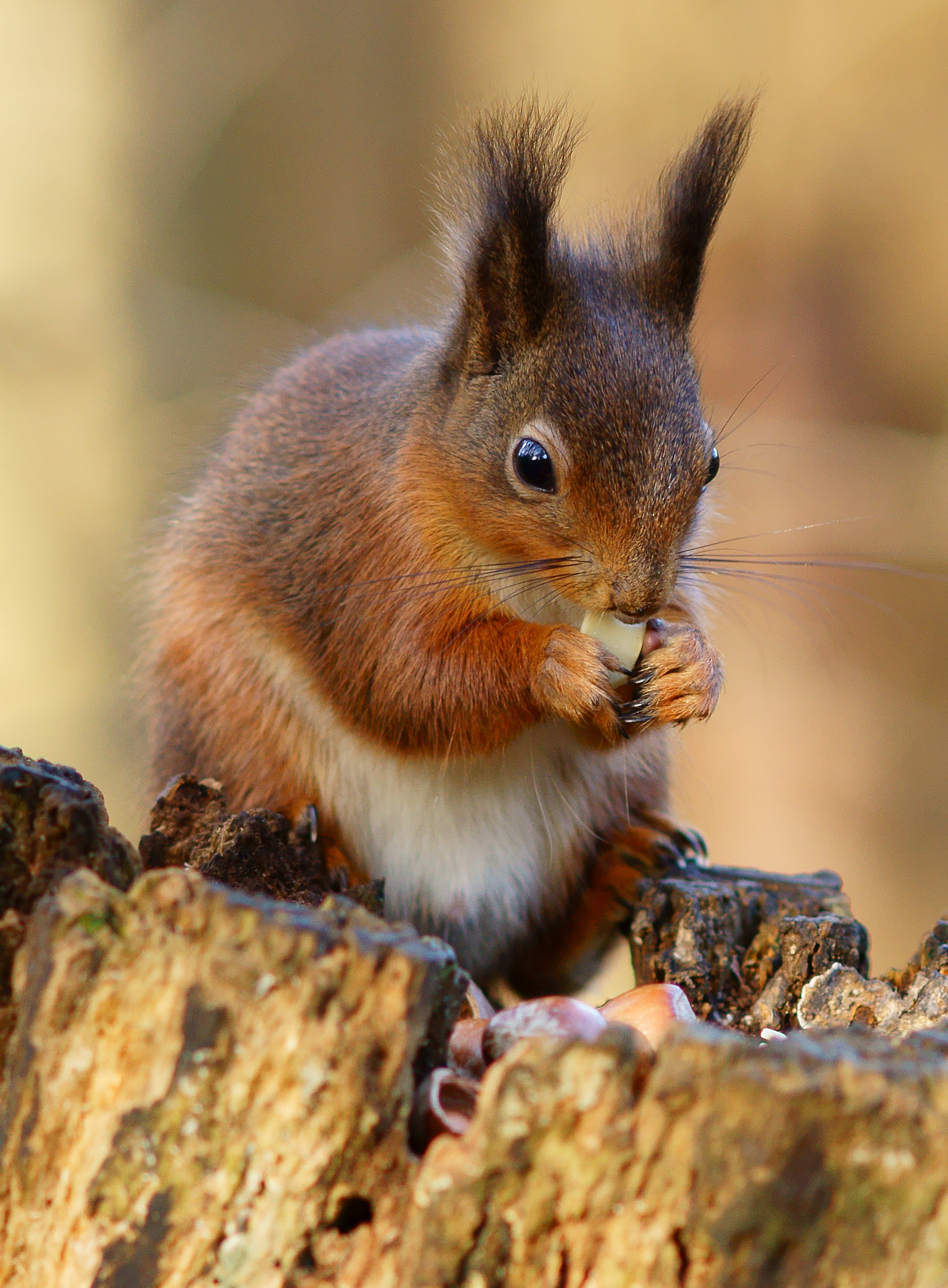
A Red squirrel (S. vulgaris) in the woodland at Alverstone Mead

Alverstone Mead Local Nature Reserve is a lowland freshwater wetland nature reserve close to Sandown, Isle of Wight. it is a part of the Alverstone Marshes Site of Special Scientific Interest.

The site is on the floodplain of the Eastern Yar, and is a popular spot for birdwatchers. The old trackbed of the Newport-Sandown railway runs through it, and is now a cycleway. In addition, the station house of Alverstone railway station, now a private residence, is still intact, and sits adjacent to Alverstone Mead.

It is owned by the Isle of Wight Council and leased to the Wight Nature Fund.
