= Alverstone Garden Village =

Housing estate on the Isle of Wight, England

Coordinates: 50°39′56″N 1°11′23″W

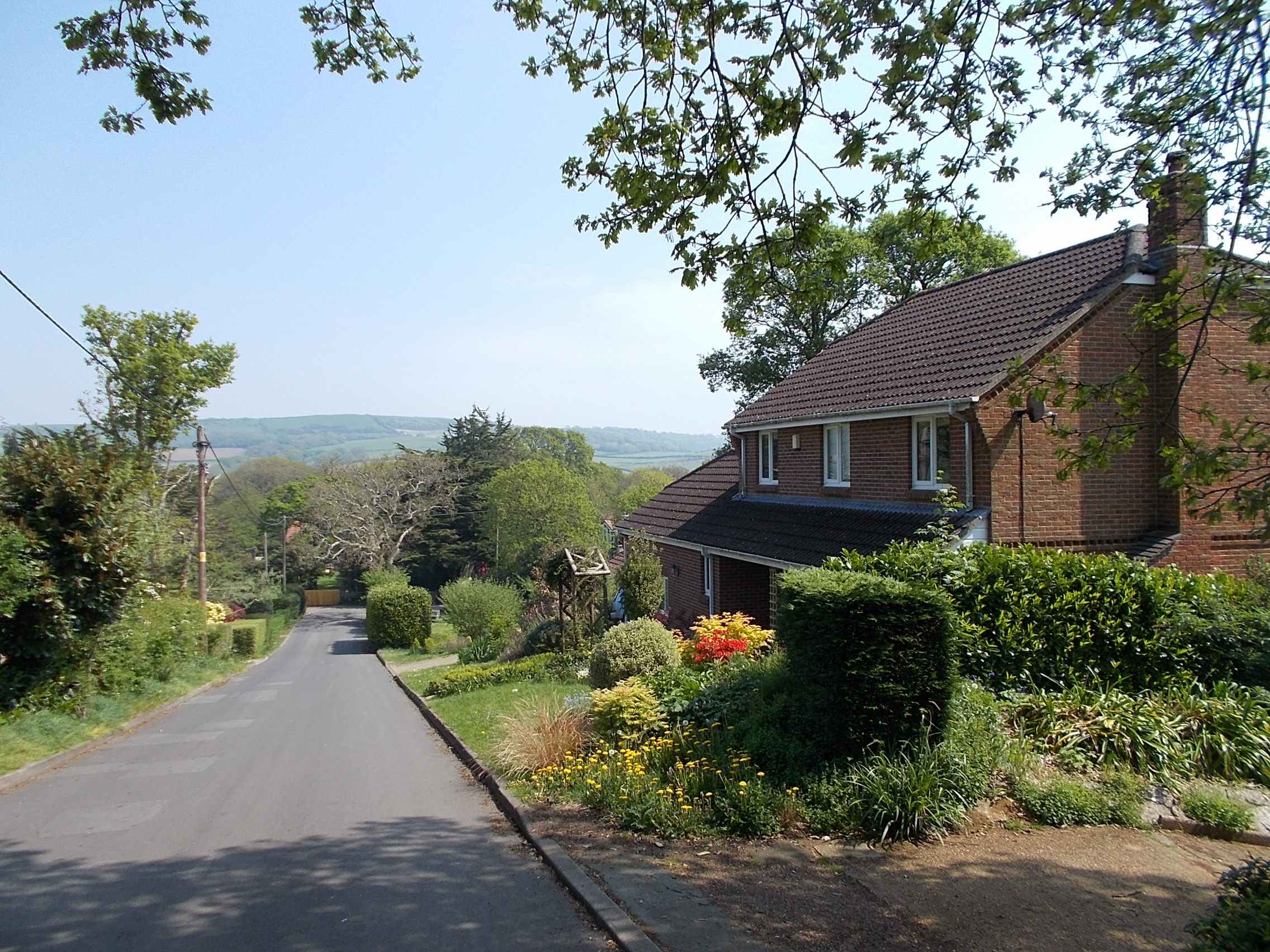
Alverstone Garden Village

Alverstone Garden Village is a housing estate built between the 1930s and the 1970s; entirely contained within Youngwoods Copse, and thus almost invisible from the older hamlet of Alverstone. At the 2011 Census the Post Office indicated that the population was included in the civil parish of Newchurch, Isle of Wight.

Transport is provided by Wightbus route 23, which runs through the estate on its way between Newport and Shanklin.
