= Kern Manor =

Manor house in Brading, Isle of Wight, England

Kern Manor (also Lacherne, 11th century; Kurne, 13th century) was a manor house in the parish of Brading on the Isle of Wight.

== History ==
Kern was held before the Conquest by Earl Harold, and in 1086 by the king. It seems afterwards to have passed to the Aula family, and part was given by Roger de Aula to the Knights Templars. His gift was confirmed by Ralph Mackerell and apparently augmented by Robert Russell. The Templars' holding was attached to the preceptory of South Baddesley, and on its suppression in 1558 Kern was granted to Winchester College. Another holding at Kern belonged at the end of the 13th century to the chaplains of Barton Oratory, and passed with their other estates in 1439 to Winchester College, who as of 1912 were owners of the whole manor. The house, a simple structure of the 16th–17th century, lies under the down, just to the north of Alverstone, and is now divided up into two cottages.
