= Branston Manor =

Listed building on the Isle of Wight

- Former names: Brandestone
- Alternative names: Brondeston

General information
- Type: Manor house
- Location: Newchurch, Unite

Branston Manor (also Brandestone, Brondeston) is a manor house on the Isle of Wight, situated within the Newchurch parish.

== History ==
The manor was held at the time of the Domesday Book in 1086 by William son of Azor, and may have passed to the de Aula family, as it was held at the end of the 13th century under William Russell of Yaverland by the lord of Whitefield for knight service. In 1346 John atte Hale held this estate in Branston. He was still in possession in 1384–5, when the reversion after his death was granted by Richard Couper, one of the heirs of John Wyvill, to Annora widow of John. In 1428 the estate was divided between Henry Howles and Richard Russell. Some land at Branston was glebe of the church of Newchurch, and was claimed in 1414 by John Clerk. Branston was later divided among various owners.
