= Mersley =

British Village

Coordinates: 50°40′45″N 1°12′56″W

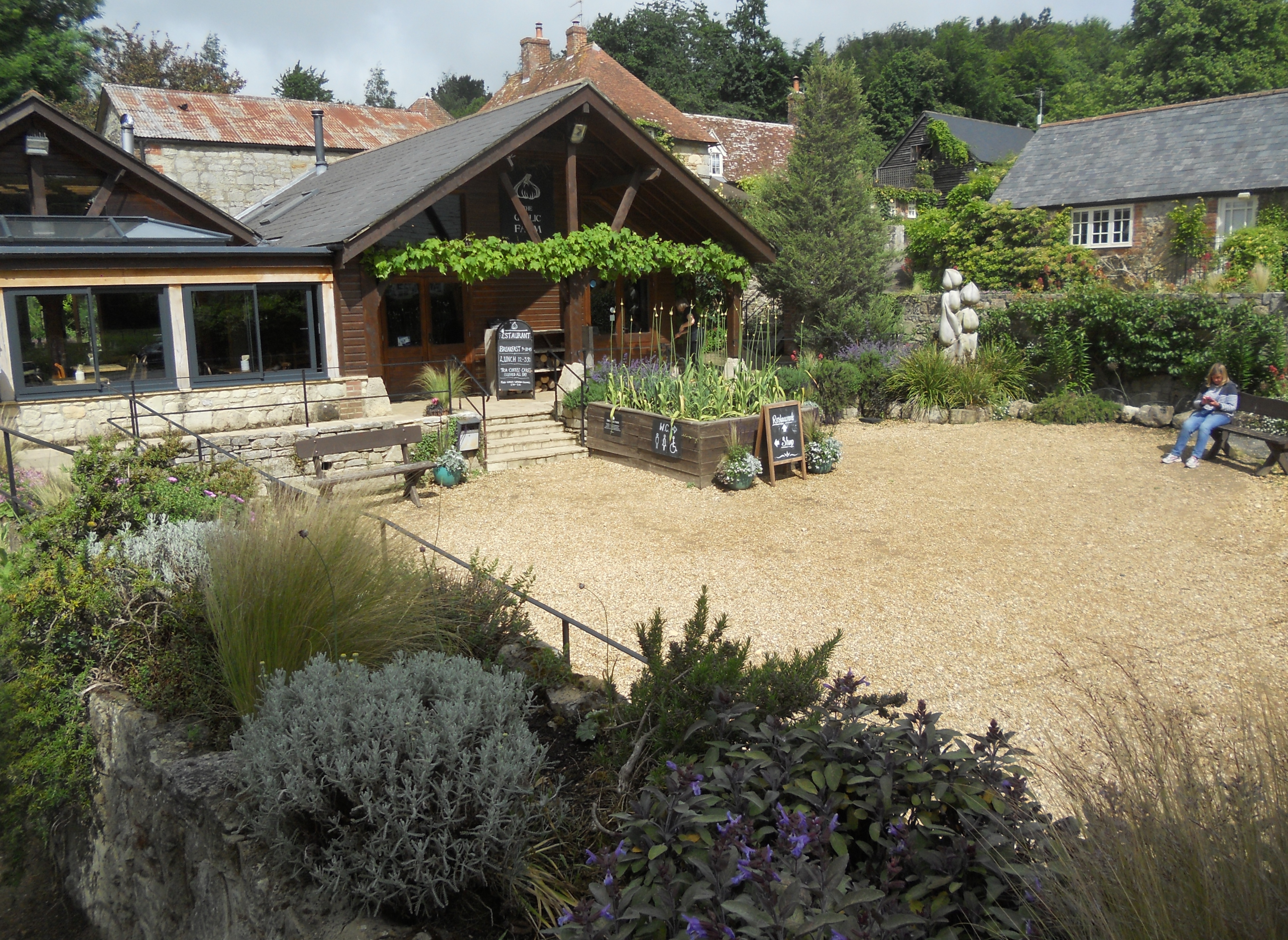
Mersley Garlic Farm

Mersley is a farming hamlet on the Isle of Wight. Mersley is in Newchurch Parish, and is adjacent to the village of Newchurch itself. Mersley is home to a large garlic farm which is part of the Isle of Wight Garlic Festival in nearby Newchurch, held annually since 1983 and now drawing 25,000 visitors a year. This garlic farm has also been investigated for inappropriate pesticide use in the past.

Potter Molly Attrill worked out of a converted barn in Mersley from 1982 to 2014.

== Name ==
The name means 'the woodland clearing or meadow belonging to a man or family called Madoc(k)', from originally Welsh Madoc(k) and Old English lēah. Mersley Down has the same origin, named after Mersley.

~1250: Maddokesley

~1270: Madekeslie

16th century: Markesley

1769: Messly, Messly Down

== Archaeological Interest ==
Mersley is the subject of archaeological interest because of findings of Roman pottery in the area. Earthenware and crockery were discovered at the Garlic Farm in the 1970s and 80s. Ridges on nearby Mersley Down might be terraces, suggesting the previous presence of a Roman vineyard. There is evidence of a possible earthwork enclosure on a farm in Mersley.

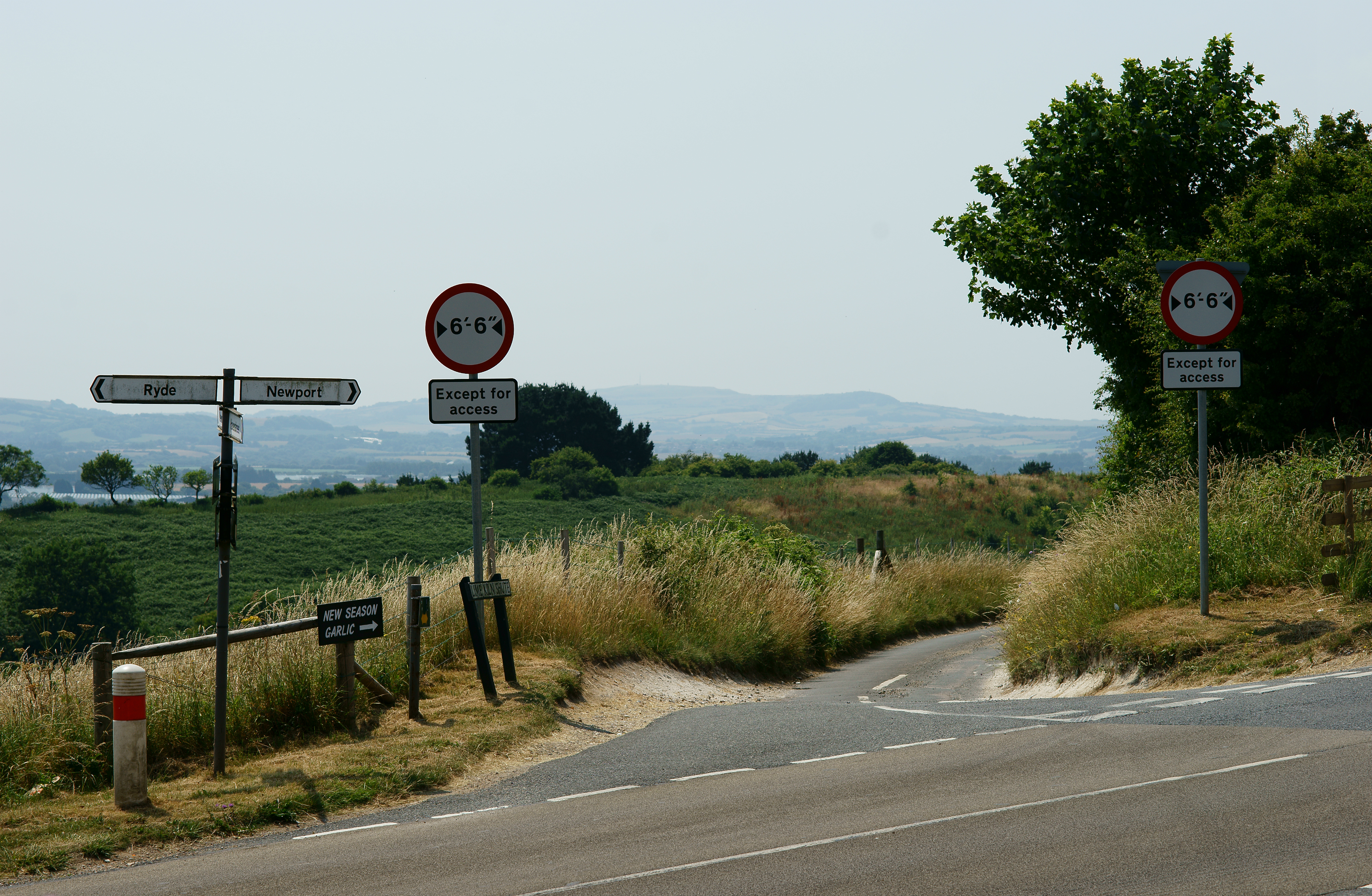
On Mersley Down

There is a chalk pit on Mersley Down.
