= Brading Marshes to St. Helen's Ledges SSSI =

Protected area on the Isle of Wight, England

Coordinates: 50.689°N 1.110°W

Brading Marshes to St. Helen's Ledges
- Site of Special Scientific Interest
- Location of Brading Marshes to St. Helen's Ledges.
- Area of search: Isle of Wight
- Grid reference: SZ635883
- Interest: Biological and Geological
- Area: 488.5 ha (1,207 acres)
- Notification date: 1951
- Location map: Natural England

Brading Marshes to St. Helen's Ledges is a 488.5-hectare (1,207-acre) Site of special scientific interest which stretches from Brading along the Yar valley between Bembridge and St Helens, Isle of Wight through to the sea at Priory Bay on the north east coast of the Isle of Wight. It encompasses the Brading Marshes RSPB reserve, Bembridge harbour and the inter tidal sand, mud flats and rocky ledges exposed off the coast at low water, including the land around St Helens Fort which is not attached to the mainland. It is the second largest SSSI on the Isle of Wight. The site was notified in 1951 for both its biological and geological features.
