= Alverstone railway station =

Disused railway station in Isle of Wight, England

Coordinates: 50°40′1.46″N 1°10′57.88″W

Alverstone
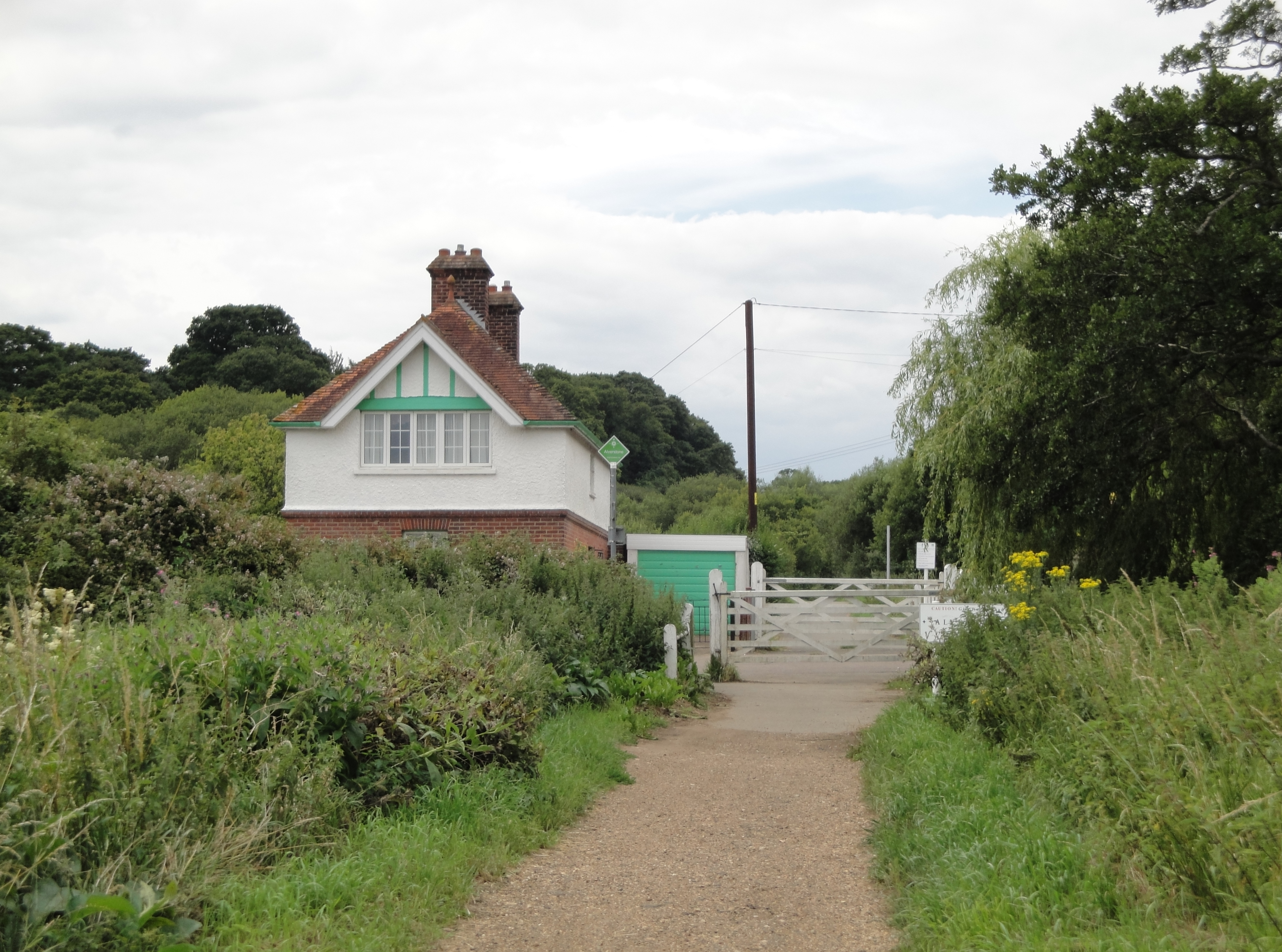
- The old station building, now converted into private residence.

General information
- Location: Alverstone, Isle of Wight; England
- Grid reference: SZ577856
- Platforms: 1

Other information
- Status: Disused

History
- Pre-grouping: Isle of Wight (Newport Junction) Railway (1868-inc;1875–1887); Isle of Wight Central Railway (1887 to 1923)
- Post-grouping: Southern Railway (1923 to 1948); Southern Region of British Railways (1948 to 1956)

Key dates
- 1 February 1875: Opened
- 6 February 1956: Closed
Location

Alverstone railway station was an intermediate station situated on the edge of Alverstone village on the Isle of Wight, off the south coast of England.

== History ==
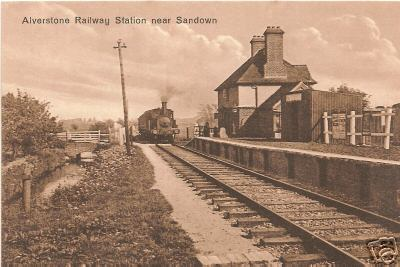
The station in the early 1900s

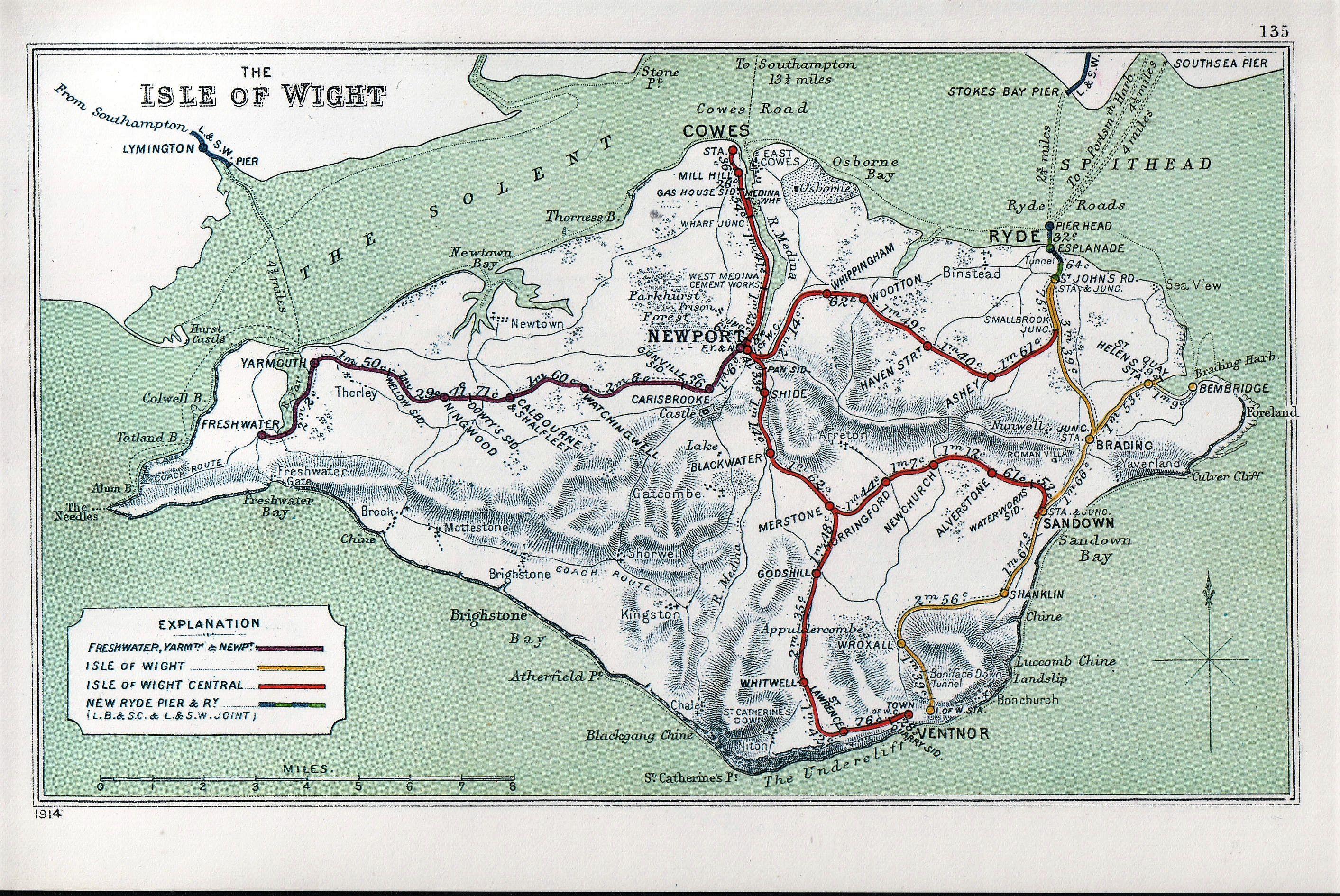
A 1914 Railway Clearing House map of lines around The Isle of Wight.

Served by the line from Newport to Sandown, the station was incorporated by the Isle of Wight (Newport Junction) Railway in 1868 opened in 1875. Absorbed by the Isle of Wight Central Railway, it became part of the Southern Railway during the Grouping of 1923. Passing on to the Southern Region of British Railways on nationalisation in 1948, it was then closed 81 years after opening by the British Transport Commission.

During a Second World War blackout a train ran through Alverstone and a railwayman had to escort the passengers back to there from Newchurch.

== The site today ==
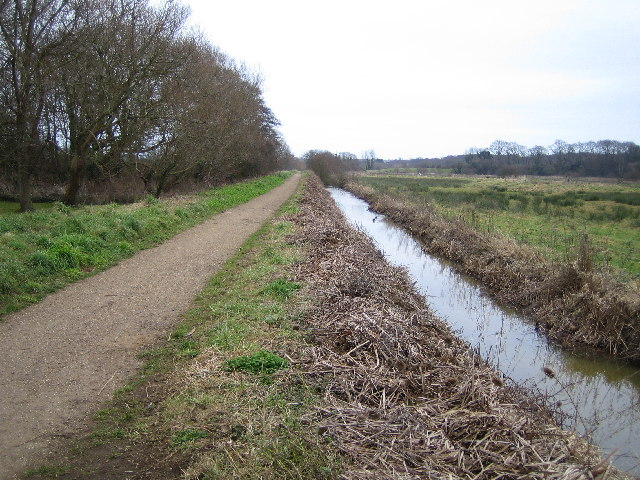
The track bed near Alverstone Station, which is now a cycle path.

The station house is now a private residence. It is a prominent landmark on the walking route and cycle path that runs through Borthwood Copse and into Alverstone Mead.

Preceding station	Disused railways	Following station
Sandown	British Railways-Southern Region; Isle of Wight Central Railway; Sandown to Newport line	Newchurch

== See also ==
- List of closed railway stations in Britain
