= All Saints' Church, Newchurch =

Church on the Isle of Wight, England

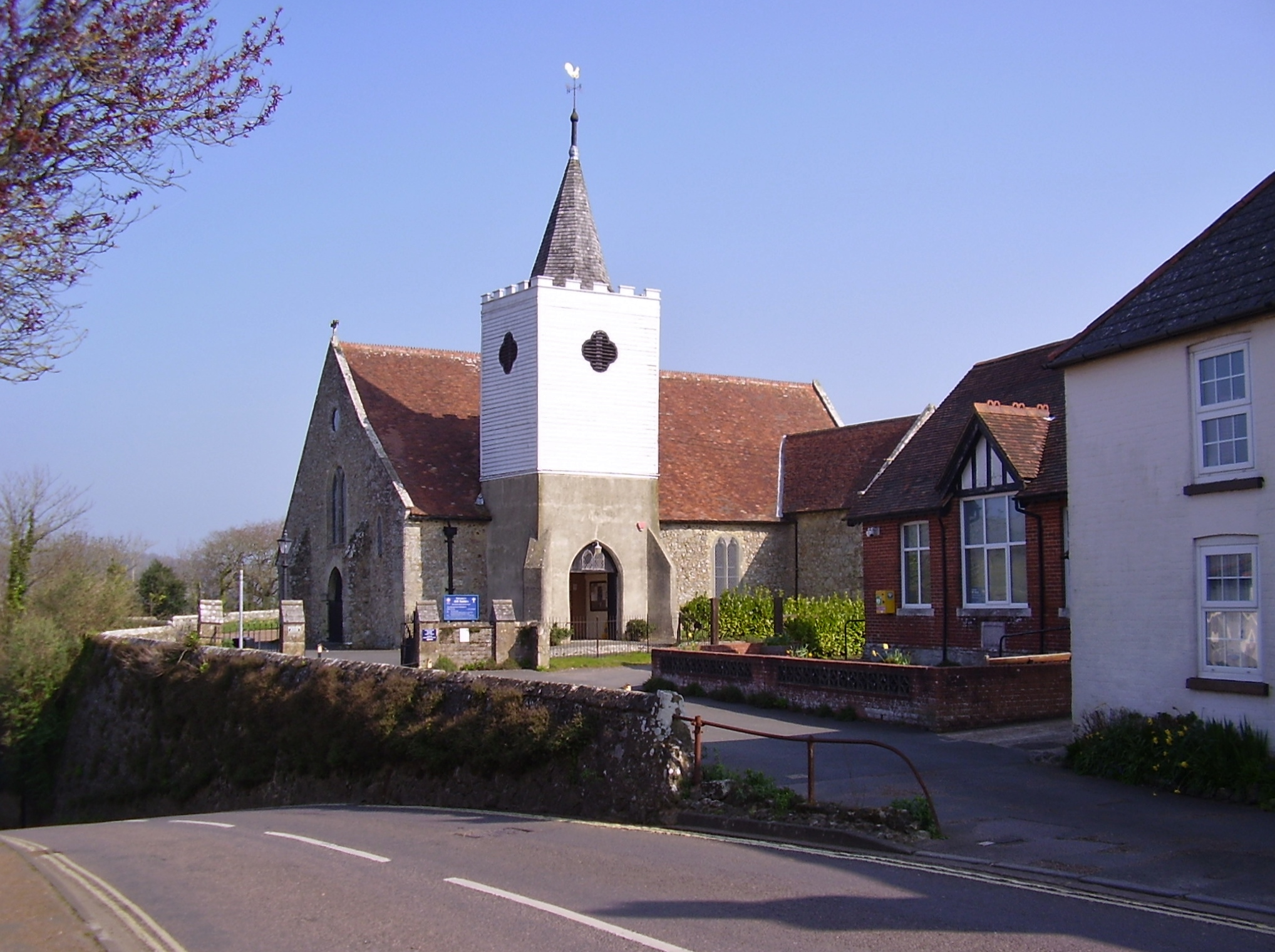

- Location within Isle of Wight
- 50°40′00″N 01°12′22″W
- Denomination: Church of England
- Churchmanship: Broad Church

History
- Dedication: All Saints

Administration
- Province: Canterbury
- Diocese: Portsmouth
- Parish: Newchurch, Isle of Wight

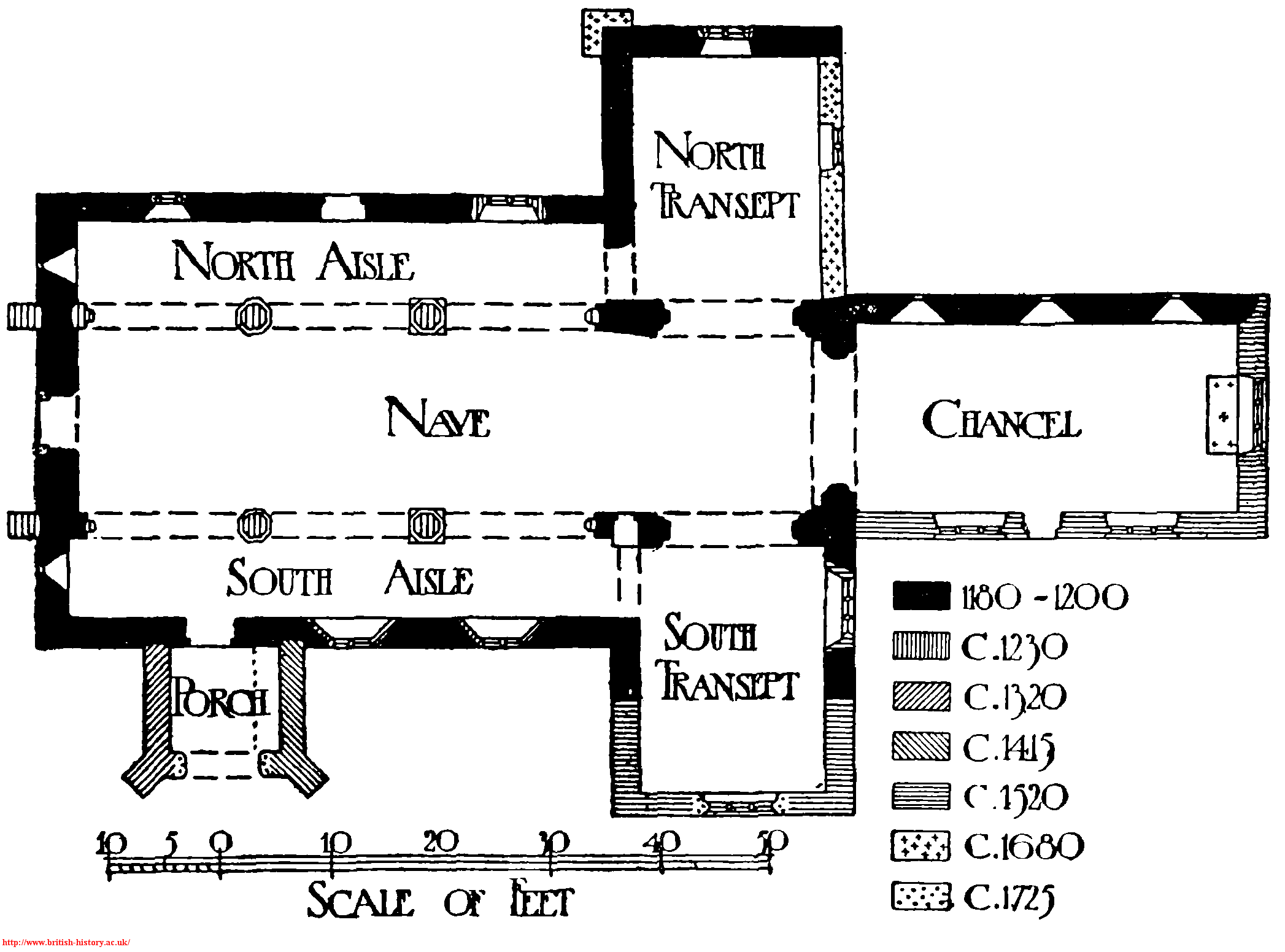
Lay out Plan of the All Saints' Church

All Saints' Church, Newchurch is a parish church in the Church of England located in Newchurch, Isle of Wight, England. The church is medieval dating from the 13th century. In 1883, restoration of the church was carried out by A.R. Barker, at the instigation of the vicar Rev. Alfred Dicker.

The simple layout of the church consists of a nave, a chancel, northern and southern aisles, and a tower. It was built on the site of an older structure which was donated by William FitzOsbern to the Lyre Abbey. Subsequently, the church came under the control of the Beaulieu Abbey. When this religious authority was dissolved, the control of the church was entrusted by Henry VIII to the Bishop of Bristol (now Gloucester and Bristol).

The church was one of the seven parishes on the Island when it was built, but now is part of several others. The unique white timber clad tower contains a small peal of six bells with a tenor weighing just 7 cwt or 350 kg.

== Geography ==
All Saints' Church is located at the north end of the village of Newchurch. On the west side of the church, the road has a steep descent which gives the impression that the church is on a bluff. The geographic setting has been described by Venables, a poet as: "To the north the gazes embraces the whole of the vale of Newchurch with the undulating ridge of the chalks down beyond, ending towards the valley of the Medina in the abrupt Slope of the St.George’s Down. The white cliffs of Culver…"

== History ==
All Saints' Church is an ancient cruciform structure. Although it was one of the six churches given by William FitzOsbern to an Lyra Abbey in Normandy, Henry VIII was later to give it to the See of Bristol. Living quarters are in a vicarage which included 3 acres of glebe.

== Architecture ==
=== Exterior ===
The church of All Saints' is a 13th-century cruciform structure with a south porch. The exterior features a red-tiled roof, walls of rough sandstone, a weatherboarded tower, a south porch, and a short spire. The nave's roof and the exterior of the north aisle appear barn-like.

=== Interior ===
The earliest building must have been of the 12th century, as there is evidence of 13th-century additions. The transept piers do not bond into the east wall of the nave, which, with its 4 feet (1.2 m) thick wall, probably formed part of the original church. The eastern arches of the aisles spring from plain-splayed imposts, and the starting pier of the south aisle does not bond into the west wall.

The 13th-century builders practically remodelled the whole structure, leaving it much as it is today – a nave of three bays, a fourth being formed by the transept arches, north and south aisles, a long chancel, north and south transepts and a south porch supporting a wooden tower containing six bells. The massive piers at the entrance to the transepts suggest a central tower. Both transepts are singularly deep and must have been original features, though the south one has been lengthened 10 feet (3.0 m), probably in the 16th century when the east window was inserted. The aisles must have been undertaken later in the century, as they are not in alignment with the transept piers. They both end in pointed arches, that to the north being splayed inwards for some ritual purpose, while the south one was rebuilt when the way to the rood-loft was cut through in the 15th century. The south wall of the nave is lighted by 14th-century windows with cusped heads, and has been raised to admit of their insertion. The north wall is pierced by two windows and a door of the 13th century, the westernmost window having been converted into a single round-headed light in the 17th century.

The entrance to the rood-loft still remains, with its steps on the aisle side. It has a semicircular head, from which springs the cross arch of the aisle with its two rings of voussoirs.

In the south wall is a priest's door. For some structural reason, its east and south walls were rebuilt in the 16th century, and it is probable that at this time, the south transept was lengthened 10 feet (3.0 m) and the porch widened eastward to form the sub-structure of a wooden tower containing the three bells mentioned in the inventory of 1553. The west wall of the nave appears to be all of one date – c.1200 – and is pierced with three original windows, a small narrow lancet in each aisle, a circular window with simple cusped filling in the centre of the gable. The crown of the west entrance has been lowered to admit the insertion of a large 'churchwarden' window, and the external jambs have been replaced with plain cut stone.

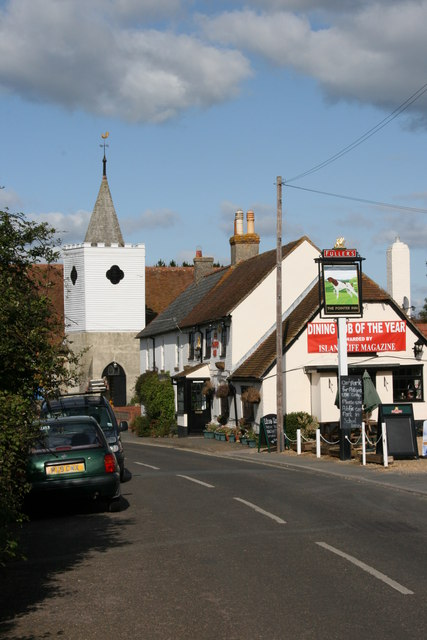

It is probable that the Dillingtons were responsible for the churchwarden creations in the north transept, and the west wall, and the final remodelling of the tower. There are two small chapels succeeding the two transepts. Over the gable of the south transeptal chapel, a "singular SAINTS or SANCTE BELL turret" has been erected (the bell was first struck when the image of the Saint was deified). In the porch, there are inscriptions in Latin on two tablets that record the generous contribution made by Richard Gard to establishing a grammar school which was founded by Richard Andrews, in 1595.

The oak pulpit with its quaint sounding-board and canopy, as also the carved 'Pelican' lectern said to have been brought from Frome, belong to the Dillington period. There are memorials (eight inscriptions) in the north transept to the Dillington family, 1674 to 1749, wall tablets to Lieutenant General Maurice Bockland (Member of Parliament from Yarmouth; d. 1765), W. Bowles (d. 1748), an author, and William Thatcher, 1776. Over the south door is a panel with the royal arms of William III, dated 1700.

Chancel

The chancel, unusually long for its width, is lighted on the north by the three blunt lancets already referred to, on the east and south by three-light 16th-century windows. The original north wall of the chancel still remains with its blunt-lancet, ungrooved window openings. Over the chancel arch is a wide splayed lancet window or opening of early 13th-century detail. The transept and chancel arches are very massive in appearance, with pointed heads and triple-splayed orders springing from slightly curved abaci, forming a continuous moulding round the piers. This responds in clumsy square bases the whole thickness of the wall, as if intended for a stop to some feature since removed. A chancel roof space is of unknown purpose.

Vaults

In the 17th and 18th centuries, a certain amount of renovation was done by the Dillingtons, then owners of Knighton Gorges Manor. Both transepts appealed to them as excellent places for family vaults, so in 1688, Sir Robert Dillington (ca. 1664–1689) obtained a faculty to build a vault in the north transept. In 1725, the south transept received their attention as a further burial place for the family, the Dillington baronetcy having become extinct four years earlier.

== Fittings ==
There are six bells, four of which were founded in 1810 by Thomas Mears of London; the other two are inscribed 'ANNO 5189 [1589]. ANTHONY BOND MADE ME 1626.' The ancient communion pieces consist of a chalice 8 inches (200 mm) high and 3.5 inches (89 mm) in diameter, with the date 1620 pricked on the cover. The alms-dish is inscribed 'The gift of Mrs. Dillington to the Parish of Newchurch anno 1737.' There is also a Sheffield plate flagon, probably given at the same time, inscribed 'DEO ET ALTARI SACRUM.' A register has records of many events since 1582, and which includes information of a Chichester earthquake that occurred on 30 November 1811 at 3.20 am, which was felt in Portsmouth at Rydes and in many other parts of the Isle of Wight.

The church has a pipe organ by Bevington dating from 1857. A specification of the organ can be found on the National Pipe Organ Register.
