= Cridmore Bog =

Coordinates: 50.631°N 1.296°W

- Site of Special Scientific Interest
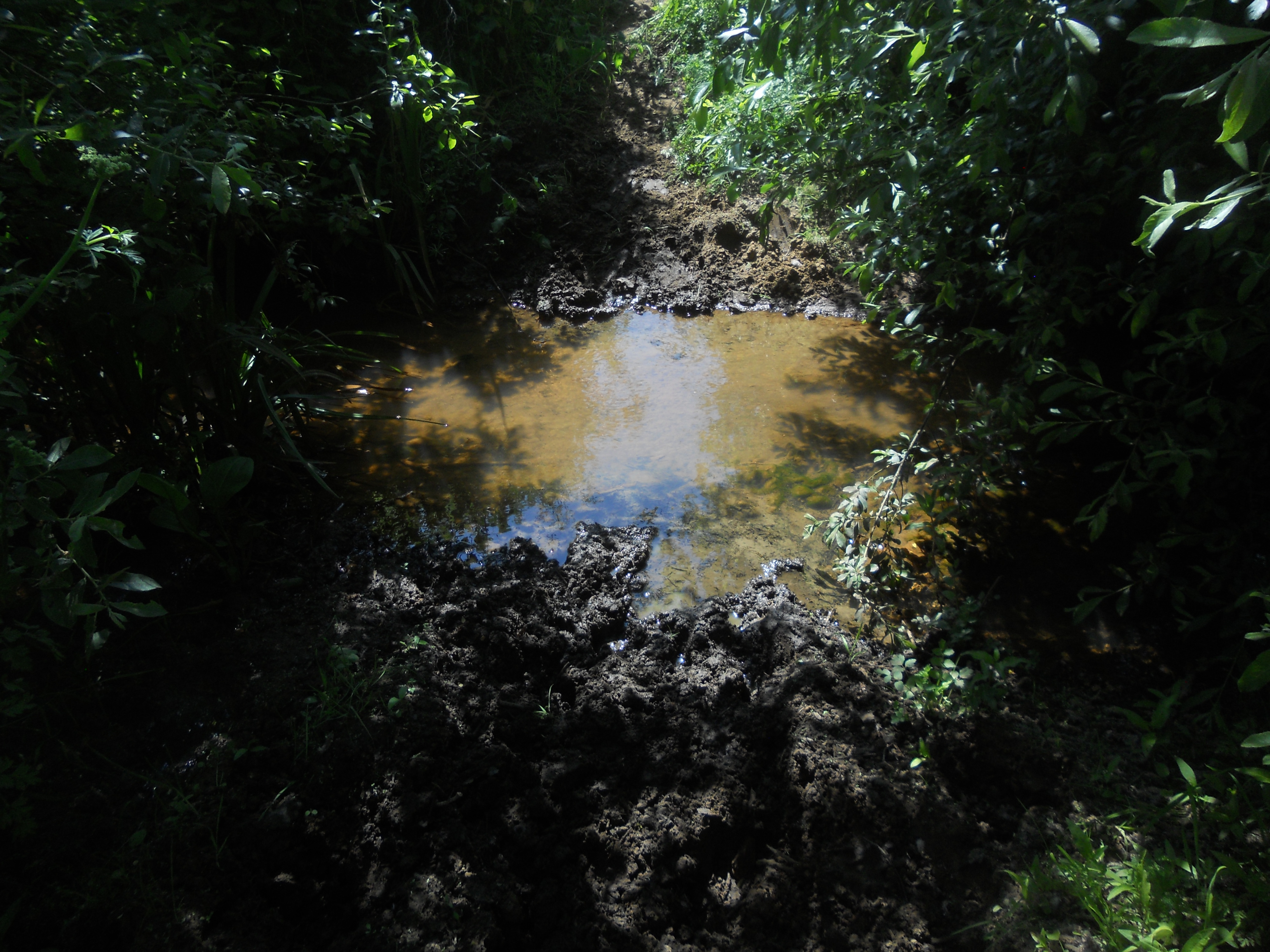
- The River Medina in the SSSI
- Location of Cridmore Bog.
- Area of search: Isle of Wight
- Grid reference: SZ495815
- Interest: Biological
- Area: 14.4 ha (36 acres)
- Notification date: 1985
- Location map: Natural England

Cridmore Bog is a 14.4-hectare (36-acre) Site of Special Scientific Interest which is west of Godshill, near the hamlet of Cridmore, which it is named after. The site was notified in 1985 for its biological features. It is adjacent to "The Wilderness", another SSSI in this area of the Isle of Wight.
