= Northpark Copse =

9.9 hectare site of special scientific interest

Coordinates: 50.689°N 1.377°W

- Site of Special Scientific Interest
- Location of Northpark Copse.
- Area of search: Isle of Wight
- Grid reference: SZ435885
- Interest: Biological
- Area: 9.9 ha (24 acres)
- Notification date: 1986
- Location map: Natural England

Northpark Copse is a 9.9-hectare (24-acre) Site of special scientific interest which is east of Shalfleet. The site was notified in 1986 for its biological features.
