= Lacey's Farm Quarry =

Geological site on the Isle of Wight, England

Coordinates: 50.67457°N 1.54425°W

- Site of Special Scientific Interest
- Location of Lacey's Farm Quarry.
- Area of search: Isle of Wight
- Grid reference: SZ323862
- Interest: geological
- Area: 0.13 ha (0.32 acres)
- Notification date: 1993
- Location map: Natural England

Lacey's Farm Quarry (grid reference SZ323862) is a 1,300 square metre geological Site of Special Scientific Interest near the large village of Freshwater, Isle of Wight, notified in 1993.

== Sources ==
- English Nature citation sheet for the site (accessed 16 July 2006)
