= Prospect Quarry =

Coordinates: 50.67808°N 1.45689°W

- Site of Special Scientific Interest
- Location of Prospect Quarry.
- Area of search: Isle of Wight
- Grid reference: SZ385866
- Interest: Biological and Geological
- Area: 4.3 ha (11 acres)
- Notification date: 1971
- Location map: Natural England

Prospect Quarry is a 4.3-hectare (11-acre) Site of special scientific interest which is located north-west of the village of Shalcombe located close to the south-west coast of the Isle of Wight. The site was notified in 1971 for both its biological and geological features.
