= Crean, Cornwall =

Hamlet in Cornwall, England

Coordinates: 50.059°N 5.654°W

Crean is a hamlet in west Cornwall, England, United Kingdom. It is situated three miles (5 km) east of Land's End.
