= Ryde Sands and Wootton Creek SSSI =

Protected area on the Isle of Wight, England

Coordinates: 50.730°N 1.188°W

Ryde Sands and Wootton Creek
- Site of Special Scientific Interest
- Location of Ryde Sands and Wootton Creek.
- Area of search: Isle of Wight
- Grid reference: SZ548920-SZ634908
- Interest: Biological
- Area: 424.4 ha (1,049 acres)
- Notification date: 1993
- Location map: Natural England

Ryde Sands and Wootton Creek is a 424.2-hectare (1,048-acre) Site of special scientific interest which stretches along the north-east coast of the Isle of Wight, from Wootton Bridge past Ryde and Seaview to Seagrove Bay. The majority of the area consists of intertidal sand and mud flats exposed at low water, a large proportion of this being Ryde Sands. Also within the site is Wootton Creek itself and the Alan Hersey Nature Reserve at Seaview Duver. The site was notified in 1993 for its biological features.
