= Rowridge Valley =

Coordinates: 50.6762°N 1.3593°W

- Site of Special Scientific Interest
- Location of Rowridge Valley.
- Area of search: Isle of Wight
- Grid reference: SZ454864
- Interest: Biological
- Area: 39.8 ha (98 acres)
- Notification date: 1987
- Location map: Natural England

Rowridge Valley is a 39.8-hectare (98-acre) Site of Special Scientific Interest (SSSI) that is 2 km (1.2 mi) east of the village of Calbourne and just east of the Rowridge Transmitter mast in the Isle of Wight. The site was notified in 1987 under the Wildlife and Countryside Act 1981 for its biological features. The site is an example of semi-natural woodland on chalk soil and is of special botanical importance as the only site in Britain where the wood calamint (Calamintha sylvatica) is to be found.

== Ecology ==
Rowridge Valley provides the best example on the Isle of Wight of an ancient, semi-natural woodland on a chalk substrate. The site comprises a dry valley with woodland on both flanks and some areas of chalk grassland, bracken and scrub. The woodland canopy is formed by scattered large trees, ash, pedunculate oak, and silver birch. The understorey, which has been coppiced in the past, consists of hazel, field maple and hawthorn, with wayfaring tree and elder near the woodland edge. The ground cover is typical of ancient woodland and includes wild garlic, dog's mercury and bluebell, with yellow archangel and moschatel in places. A more unusual plant is toothwort, which grows parasitically on the roots of old hazel trees. On the upper part of the east slope is an area of flinty gravel; here there is no wild garlic, but a profusion of bluebells and red campion, and a patch of bracken.

There are several areas of chalk grassland on the site. These are grazed by rabbits and have a number of chalkland plants including rock rose, wild strawberry, wild marjoram, cowslip, and burnet rose. In one area, dense hazel scrub seems to be invading the grassland. The Duke of Burgundy fritillary occurs on the grassland, in one of only three locations on the Isle of Wight where it occurs, and the green hairstreak and brown argus butterflies also occur here.
