= Locks Farm Meadow =

Coordinates: 50.71510°N 1.36539°W

- Site of Special Scientific Interest
- Location of Locks Farm Meadow.
- Area of search: Isle of Wight
- Grid reference: SZ449908
- Interest: Biological
- Area: 2.3 ha (5.7 acres)
- Notification date: 1988
- Location map: Natural England

Locks Farm Meadow is a 2.3-hectare (5.7-acre) Site of special scientific interest which just east of Porchfield, Isle of Wight. The site was notified in 1988 for its biological features.
