= Bembridge School And Cliffs SSSI =

Protected area on the Isle of Wight, England

Coordinates: 50.674°N 1.091°W

Bembridge School And Cliffs
- Site of Special Scientific Interest
- Location of Bembridge School And Cliffs.
- Area of search: Isle of Wight
- Grid reference: ST647869
- Interest: Geological
- Area: 12.58 ha (31.1 acres)
- Notification date: 1999
- Location map: Natural England

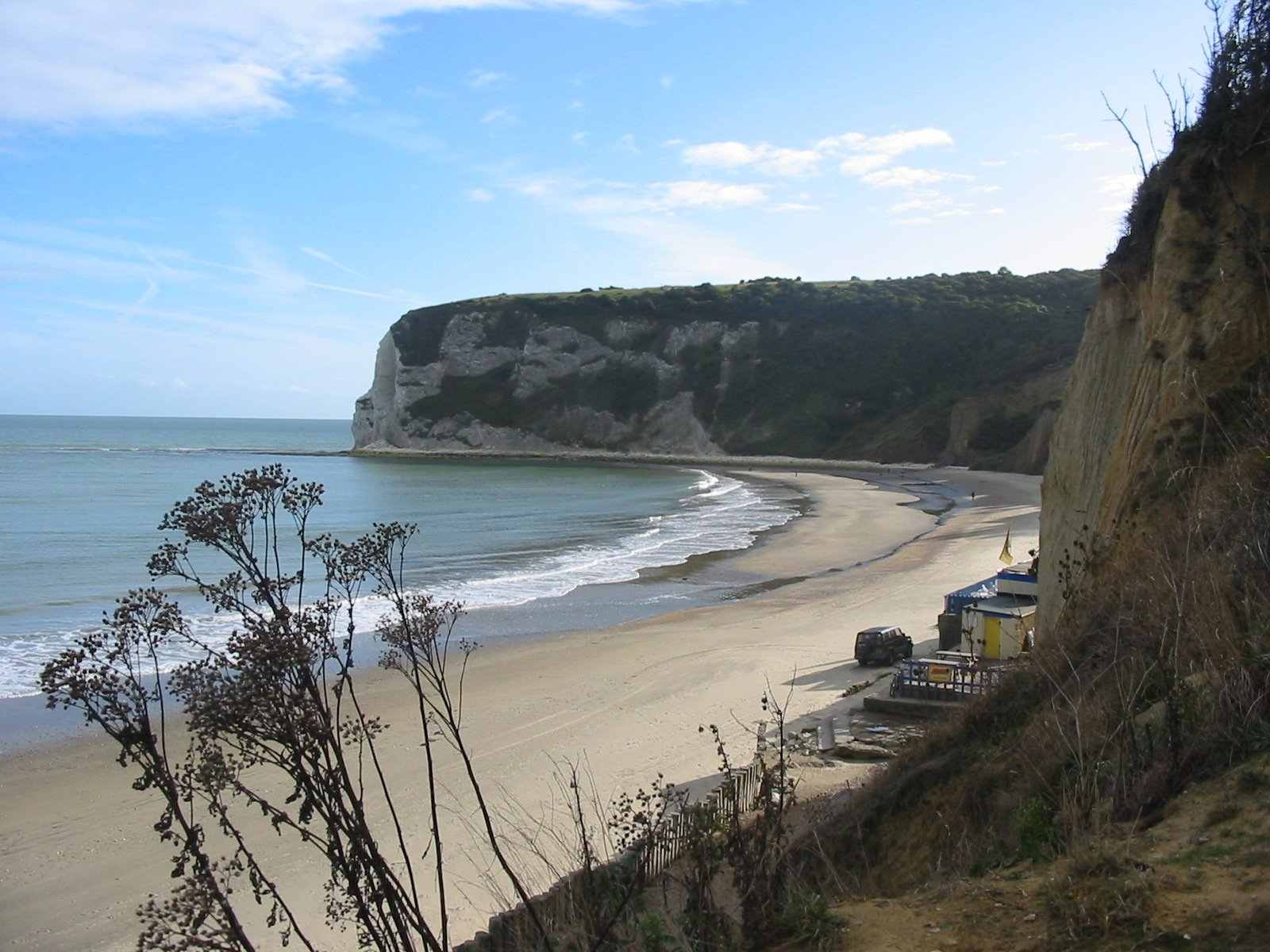

Bembridge School And Cliffs SSSI (grid reference ST647869) is a 12.58 hectare geological Site of Special Scientific Interest near Bembridge on the Isle of Wight, notified in 1999.

It is listed in the Geological Conservation Review. This site consists of the coastral strip in the northern part of Whitecliff Bay. Steyne Wood Clays containing fossils from the Quaternary period are found at the site.
