= Alverstone =

Village on the Isle of Wight, England

Coordinates: 50.66667°N 1.183333°W

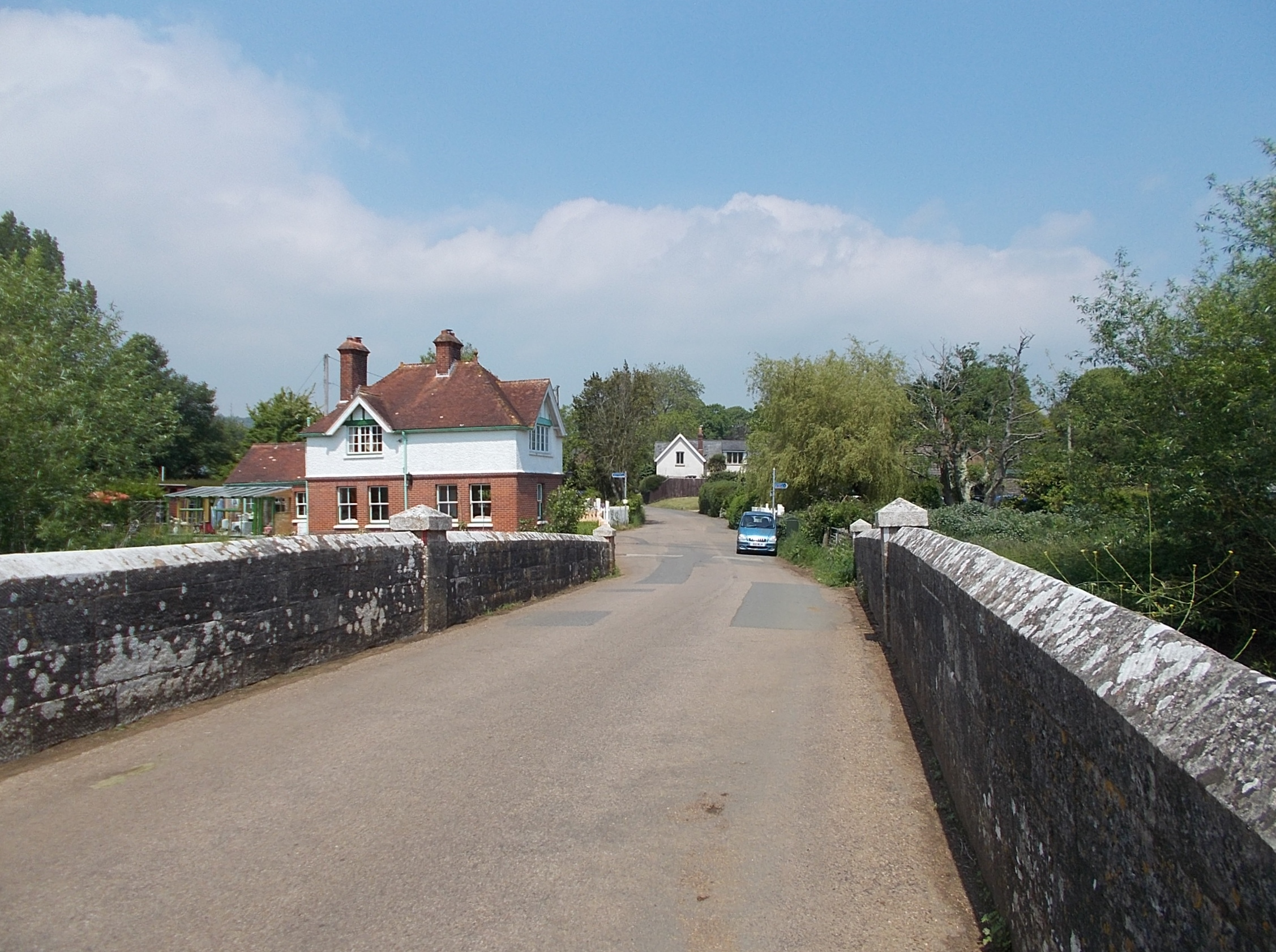
- The former Alverstone railway station, now a private residence, and the bridge crossing the Eastern Yar

- Location within the Isle of Wight
- OS grid reference: SZ577856
- Unitary authority: Isle of Wight
- Ceremonial county: Isle of Wight
- Region: South East
- Country: England
- Sovereign state: United Kingdom
- Post town: SANDOWN
- Postcode district: PO36
- Dialling code: 01983
- Police: Hampshire and Isle of Wight
- Fire: Hampshire and Isle of Wight
- Ambulance: Isle of Wight
- UK Parliament: Isle of Wight East

Alverstone is a village 2 miles from the east coast of the Isle of Wight, near Sandown. Up until 1960, boating took place on the river and tea-gardens were very popular with local people, who came by train on excursions.

== History ==
There is evidence from an archaeological dig in Alverstone of a Roman military presence in the area.

Kern Farm is the oldest farm in Alverstone, said to have a secret underground path, situated to the north of the village in the small hamlet of Kern. It was at one point a Mill held in 1086 by William I and previously by King Harold at the time of the Norman Invasion. Alverstone Farm, situated to the east of the village, consists of a manor mentioned in the Domesday Book and other sandstone buildings of interest.

When Richard Webster became Chief Justice of England in 1900, he chose the title Lord Alverstone because it was the title he was permitted to choose which was "closest" to Sandown, one of his favourite locales. Alverstone Manor is located here.

Prince Albert was instrumental in creating a 'model' brickworks in Alverstone in the middle of the 19th century (but that is a different 'Alverstone', east of Whippingham, on the southern edge of QV's Osborne Estate).

The Village Hall was built by Lord Alverstone in 1879 to serve as the village school. It remained as a school until 1921 when it briefly served as a church.

The Newport Junction Railway opened a station at Alverstone on 1 February 1875, and the station first appeared in a public schedule in June 1876. The journey to Sandown took 3 minutes and the journey to Newport took 20 minutes. Alverstone railway station finally closed 6 February 1956. The original wooden station was replaced with one built with earth and clinkers, with wood siding.

There are many wetlands around Alverstone. Nature lovers enjoy visiting the Alverstone Marshes.

The Alverstone Mead is a 55-acre (220,000 m^{2}) woodland and nature reserve about 1-mile (1.6 km) from Sandown. Alverstone Mead is southeast of Alverstone, and south of the cycleway between Sandown and Newport. It was farmed as water meadows until 1993. Since then the lease has been held by the Wight Nature Council and it has served as a nature reserve with some ancient woodland. It was once part of the Lower Borthwood Farm.

Transport is provided by Wightbus route 23, running between Newport and Shanklin.

The bridge over the Eastern Yar marks the boundary between the civil parishes of Newchurch and Brading.

Christopher Rhodes, an actor, baronet and World War II veteran was from Alverstone.

== Name ==
The name means 'the farmstead or estate belonging to a man called Ælfrēd', from Old English Ælfrēd (personal name) and tūn.

1086: Alvrestone

1289: Alvredeston

1336: Alverdeston

1346: Alfredeston

1535: Alverston
