= Greatwood And Cliff Copses SSSI =

16.3 hectares wooded areas

Coordinates: 50.613°N 1.198°W

Greatwood And Cliff Copses
- Site of Special Scientific Interest
- Location of Greatwood And Cliff Copses.
- Area of search: Isle of Wight
- Grid reference: SZ5680 - SZ5780
- Interest: Biological
- Area: 16.3 ha (40 acres)
- Notification date: 1986
- Location map: Natural England

Greatwood And Cliff Copses are two wooded areas totalling 16.3 hectares which are a Site of special scientific interest to the southwest of Shanklin. The site was notified in 1986 for its biological features.
