= Ashey Manor =

- Former names: Aschesaye
- Alternative names: Aissheseye

General information
- Type: Manor house
- Location: Ashey, United Kingdom
- Construction started: 1228

Ashey Manor (also Aissheseye, Aschesaye, Asshaye) is a manor house in Ashey on the Isle of Wight, situated within the Newchurch parish. It was historically linked with Ryde Manor.

== History ==
It was granted to the abbey of Wherwell near Andover before 1228, and in 1291 was of the considerable annual value of £41 6s. 2d. It certainly extended to the seashore, and the passage from Ryde to Portsmouth was one of its sources of income. Ashey remained with Wherwell until the Dissolution. It was leased by the last abbess, Morphita Kingsmill, to Giles Worsley and Elizabeth his wife 4 December 1538. After the Dissolution Giles Worsley continued as tenant and collector of dues till the grant of the manor to him by the Crown in 1544. He died in 1558, leaving a son James, who died intestate soon after his father, when the estates were claimed by Sir Robert Worsley of Worsley, Lancs., as cousin and heir-at-law to Giles. This claim was contested by Richard Worsley, half-brother of James, in the Court of Wards and Liveries in 1563, when it was awarded that Sir Robert was to take a third, afterwards known as the manor of Ryde, while Richard was to have the part which had been bequeathed by Giles to his widow Margaret, comprising the site of the manor. Richard Worsley died at Ashey 31 August 1599, when the manor came to his son Bowyer, afterwards knighted by James I. According to his contemporary, Sir John Oglander, Sir Bowyer Worsley was a reckless, improvident man. His son John having predeceased him, he sold Ashey in 1624 to Thomas Cotele. The manor then followed the same descent as Niton (q.v.) until 1789, when George Lord Mount Edgcumbe sold it to Mr. Joseph Bettesworth. He devised it in 1805 to his wife, with remainder to his younger daughter Augusta wife of Alexander Shearer, whose son Bettesworth P. Shearer conveyed it to George Player of Gosport. Player's daughter Elizabeth Lydia married Captain Thomas Robert Brigstocke, R.N., whose grandson William Player Brigstocke owned it as of 1912.
