= Princelett =

Hamlet on the Isle of Wight

Coordinates: 50°38′34″N 1°12′36″W

- Hamlet
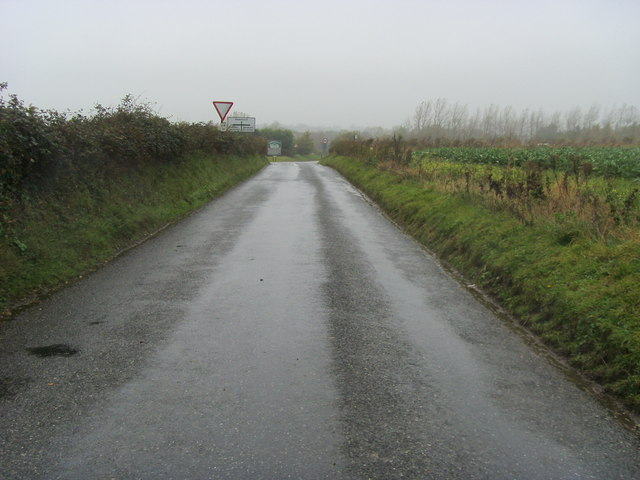
- Princelett Shute

- Location within the Isle of Wight
- OS grid reference: SZ5599782931
- Civil parish: Newchurch
- Unitary authority: Isle of Wight
- Ceremonial county: Isle of Wight
- Region: South East
- Country: England
- Sovereign state: United Kingdom
- Post town: SANDOWN
- Police: Hampshire and Isle of Wight
- Fire: Hampshire and Isle of Wight
- Ambulance: Isle of Wight

Princelett, sometimes spelled "Princelet", is a hamlet on the Isle of Wight. Princelett is in Newchurch civil parish. Until the mid 20th Century it was known chiefly for its milk distribution business known as Princelett Dairy.

== Name ==
The name means 'the spring belonging to a man called Prim', from Old English Prim (personal name) and flōde.

1271: Prunesloude (probably an error of Primesfloude)

1305: Premsfloude

1316: Prymesfloude

1428: Prynslode

1769: Princelet
