= America Wood =

Protected area on the Isle of Wight, England

Coordinates: 50.63495°N 1.19961°W

- Site of Special Scientific Interest
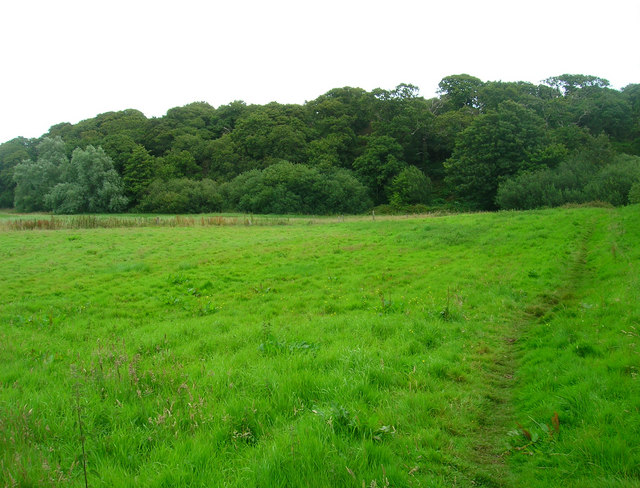
- Location of America Wood.
- Area of search: Isle of Wight
- Grid reference: SZ567820
- Interest: Biological
- Area: 21.4 ha (53 acres)
- Notification date: 1986
- Location map: Natural England

America Wood (grid reference SZ567820) is a 21.4 hectare biological Site of Special Scientific Interest on the Isle of Wight, notified in 1986. Legend has it that the name derives from the use of oak trees grown here to build ships utilised in the American War of Independence. However, the name Americas Wood appears on Andrews Map of the Island in 1769, six years before the outbreak of the War of Independence.

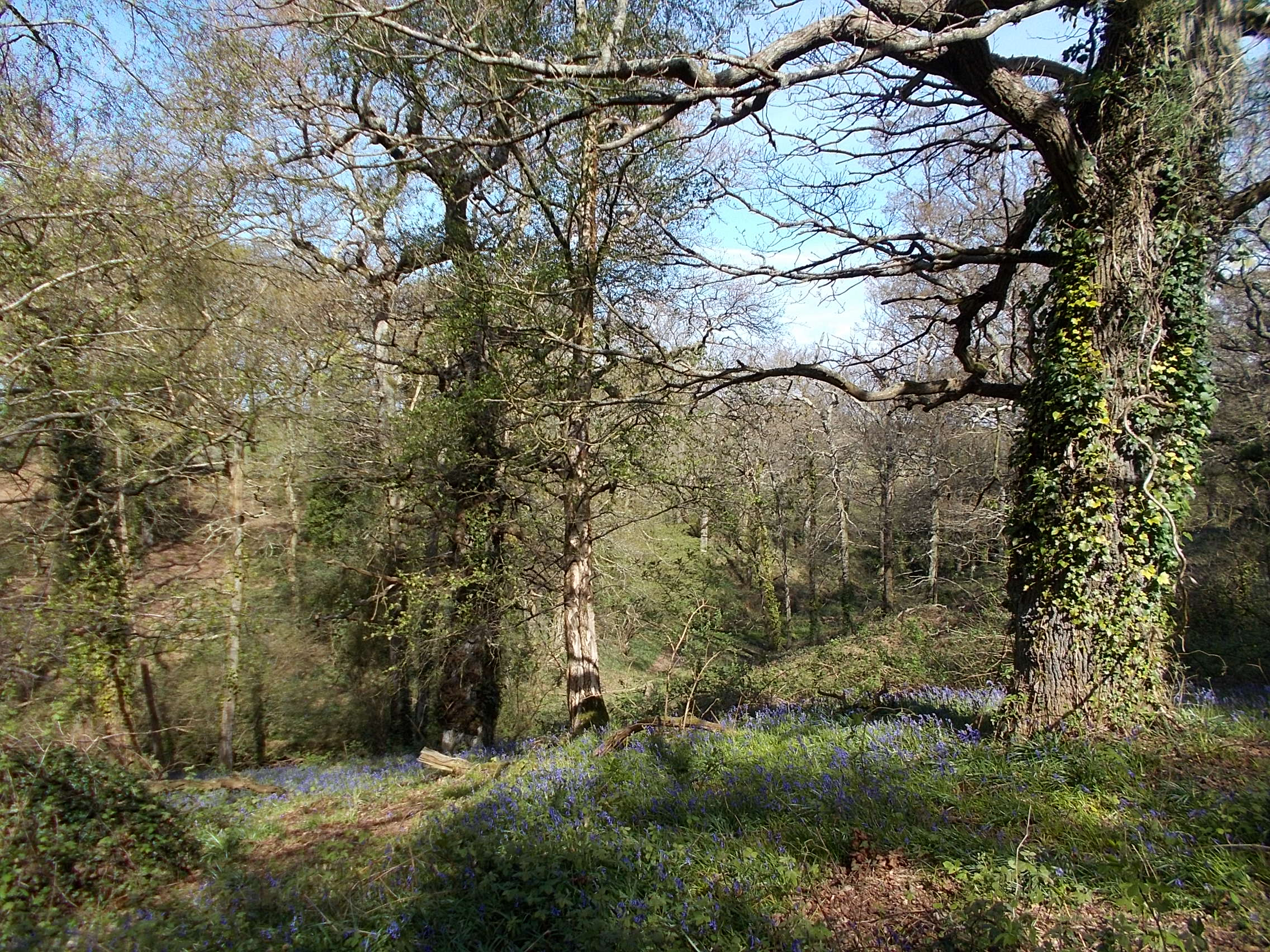
The wood in early spring
