= Croanford =

Hamlet in Cornwall, England

Coordinates: 50.509°N 4.776°W

Croanford: Cornish: Res Krowyn
- Location within Cornwall
- OS grid reference: SX033714
- Civil parish: Egloshayle
- Unitary authority: Cornwall
- Ceremonial county: Cornwall
- Region: South West
- Country: England
- Sovereign state: United Kingdom
- Post town: Wadebridge
- Postcode district: PL27
- Police: Devon and Cornwall
- Fire: Cornwall
- Ambulance: South Western

Croanford (Cornish: Res Krowyn, meaning ford of a little hut) is a hamlet in Cornwall, England. It is in the parish of Egloshayle.
