= Eastern Yar =

River on the Isle of Wight, England

Coordinates: 50°41′32″N 1°06′39″W

Eastern Yar River Yar
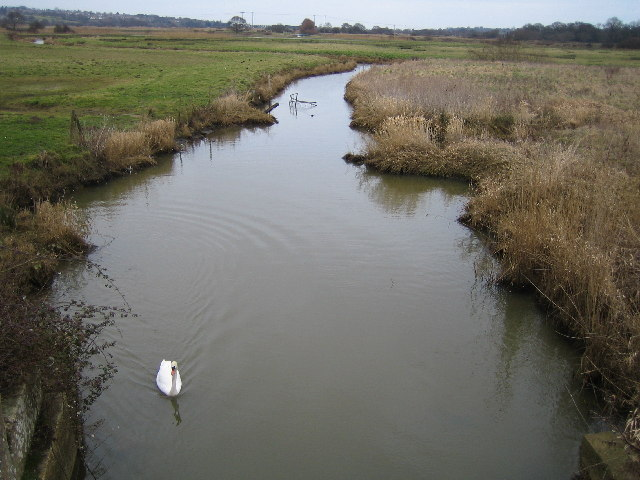
- The Eastern Yar at Brading marshes

Location
- Country: England
- Region: Southeast England
- County: Isle of Wight

Physical characteristics
- Source
  - location: Niton, Isle of Wight
- Mouth: The Solent
  - location: Bembridge Harbour, Isle of Wight
- Length: 20 km (12 mi)

Basin features
- Tributaries
  - left: Scotchells Brook, Wroxall Stream

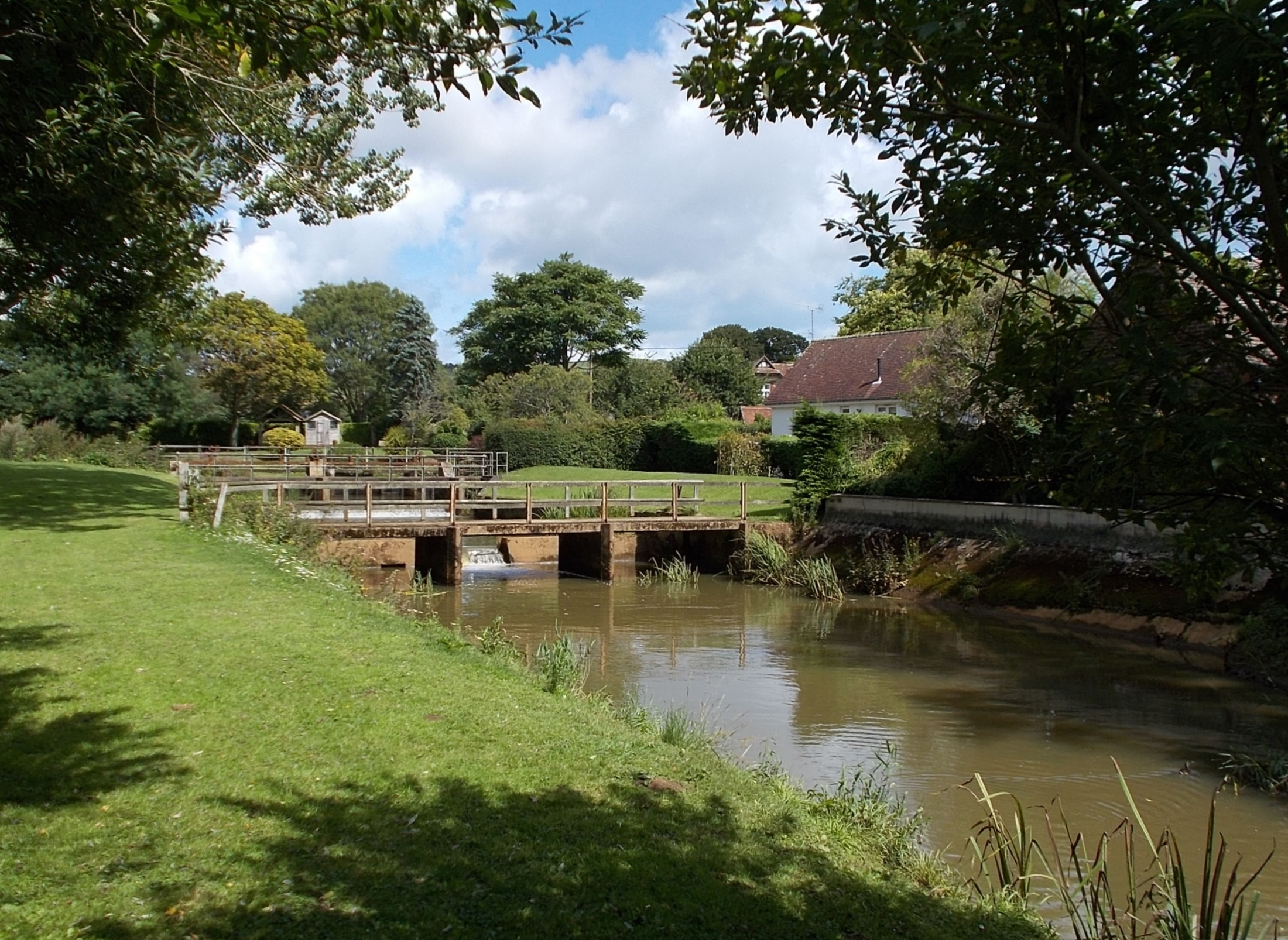
River Yar at Alverstone

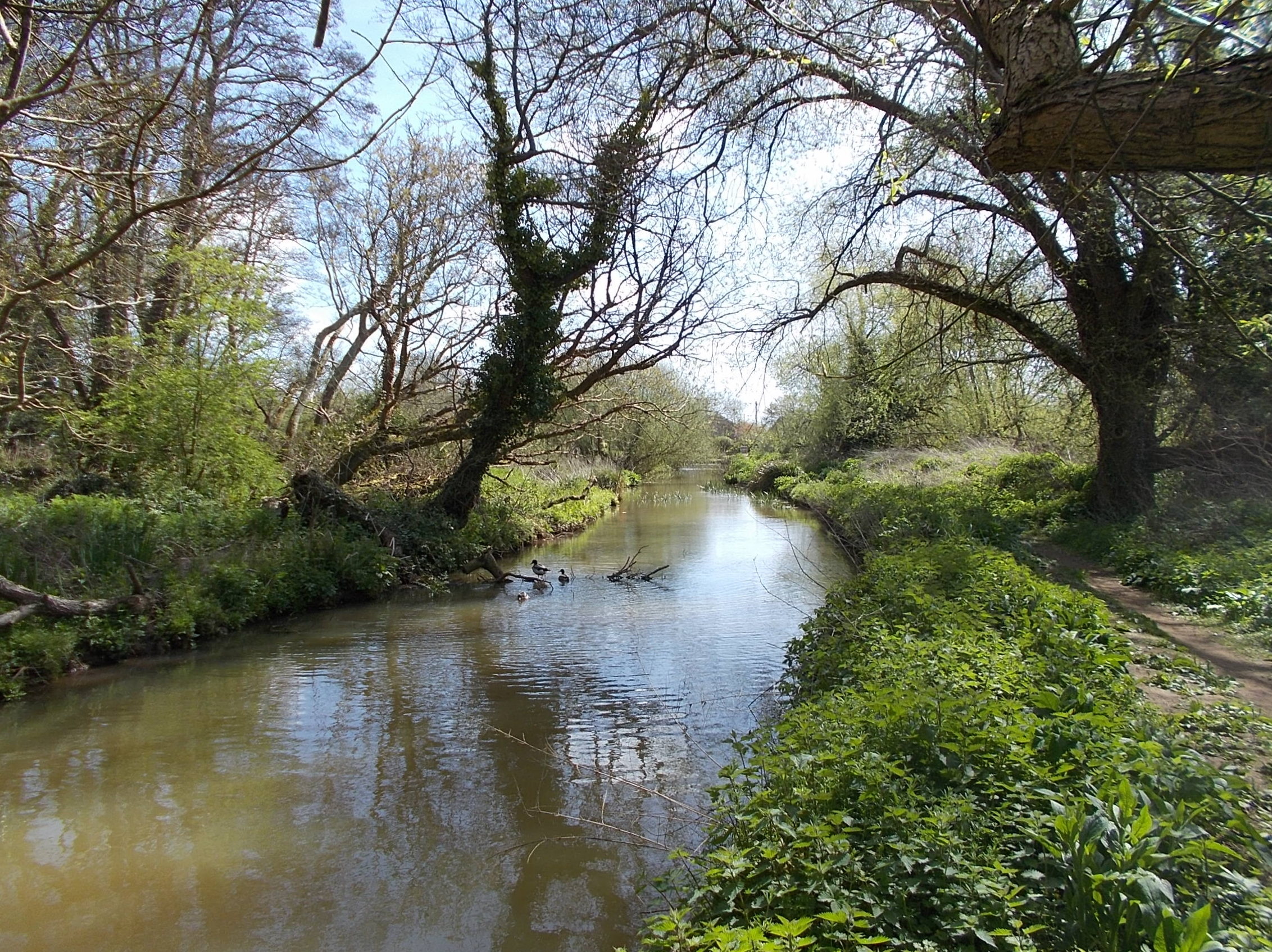
Riverside scene in early spring, near Alverstone

The River Yar on the Isle of Wight, England, rises in a chalk coomb in St. Catherine's Down near Niton, close to the southern tip of the island. It flows across the Lower Cretaceous rocks of the eastern side of the island, through the gap in the central Upper Cretaceous chalk ridge of the Island at Yarbridge, then across the now drained Brading Haven to Bembridge Harbour in the northeast. It is the longest river on the Isle of Wight.

For most of its course, the river passes through rural areas. At Alverstone, a small weir uses water from the river to power a water mill.

The Yar is one of two rivers on the Isle of Wight with the same name. It is referred to as the Eastern Yar if it is necessary to distinguish between them with the other river being known as the Western Yar.

== Name ==
The name may come from the "lost name" Yarneford, meaning 'the ford of the eagles', from Old English earn and ford. It could also mean 'the gravelly or muddy ford'. The ford was probably near the mouth of the river, near St Helens. The name is a back-formation.
