= The Wilderness SSSI, Isle of Wight =

Site of Special Scientific Interest in the Isle of Wight, England

Coordinates: 50.6465°N 1.2734°W

The Wilderness
- Site of Special Scientific Interest
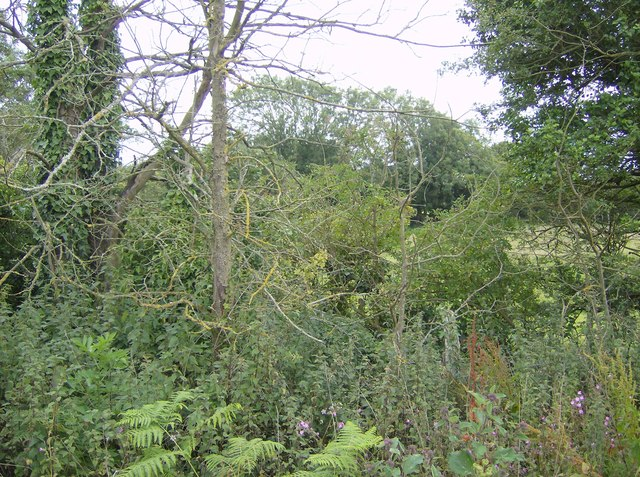
- Location of The Wilderness.
- Area of search: Isle of Wight
- Grid reference: SZ505824
- Interest: Biological
- Area: 12.6 ha (31 acres)
- Notification date: 1951
- Location map: Natural England

The Wilderness is a Site of Special Scientific Interest which is located on the Isle of Wight, England. It is close to the village of Rookley in the valley of the River Medina. The Wilderness is an area of wet woodland over a quite deep peat soil with adjacent areas of unimproved acid grassland and wet grassland. The SSSI covers an area of 12.59 hectares (31.1 acres), the boundaries being reset in 1984 to exclude an area of grassland which had been artificially improved.

== Habitat ==
Wilderness woodlands are not ancient woods and appear to have resulted from colonisation of trees on former grazing land and some parts of the site were open until relatively recently. The dominant species in the woodland are common oak (Quercus robur and sallow (Salix cinerea), with a few silver birch (Betula pendula) and common alder (Alnus glutinosa) making up the balance. The shrub layer is dominated by brambles (Rubus fruticosus) and there are two areas of bog myrtle (Myrica gale), numbering 20 bushes altogether and making up what may be the largest population of this species left on the Isle of Wight. The ground vegetation has areas where the dominant plant is the tussock sedge (Carex paniculata) and some of these exceed 1.5 metres (4.9 ft) in height while the wettest parts of the wood retain relicts of the flora of the original open bog such as Sphagnum auriculatum. The grassland adjacent to the wood is home to a variety of species typical of wet, acidic grassland, species and their habitat which are uncommon on the Isle of Wight. The most diverse area of the Wilderness SSSI is where water flushes out of the soil and the sward is dominated by sedges and rushes among which are cottongrass (Eriophorum angustifolium) and other wetland grasses and herbs. In summary, the Wilderness is an unusual site where oak and alder woodland has grown in peaty soils, where the herb layer is dominated by large clumps of tussock sedge.
