= Alverstone Marshes =

Wetland on the Isle of Wight, England

Coordinates: 50.66997°N 1.19194°W

- Site of Special Scientific Interest
- Location of Alverstone Marshes.
- Area of search: Isle of Wight
- Grid reference: SZ572859
- Interest: Biological
- Area: 83.8 hectare
- Notification date: 1951
- Location map: Natural England

Alverstone Marshes (grid reference SZ572859) is an 83.8 hectare biological Site of Special Scientific Interest on the Isle of Wight, notified in 1951.

The Alverstone Marshes are the site of a wetland restoration project by the Royal Society for the Protection of Birds. It is also noted for water voles.

== Sources ==
- English Nature citation sheet for the site (accessed 5 August 2006)
