= Newchurch, Isle of Wight =

Coordinates: 50.66454°N 1.20834°W

Newchurch
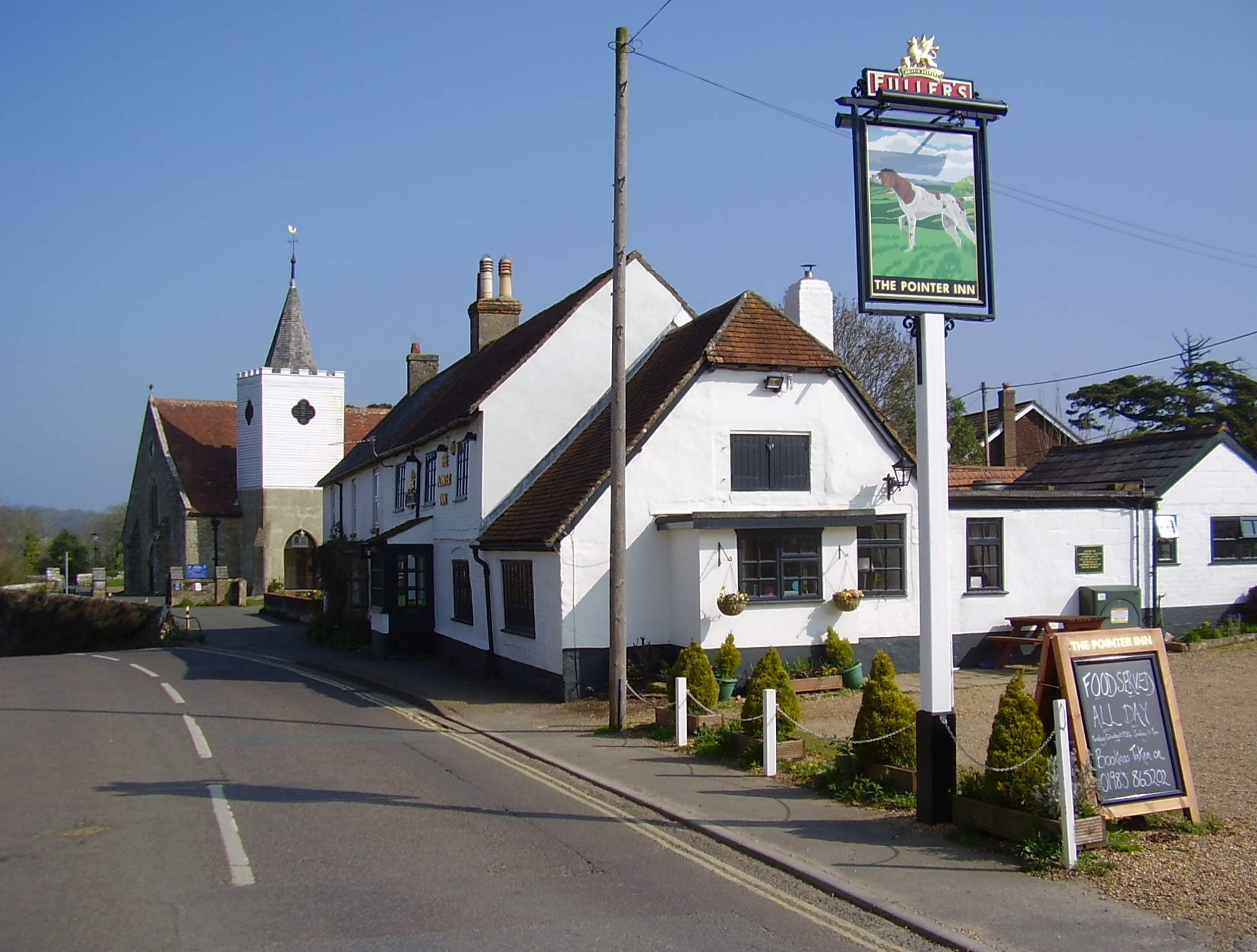
- Newchurch All Saints' Church & Pointer Inn

- Location within the Isle of Wight
- Area: 16.0233 km^{2} (6.1866 sq mi)
- OS grid reference: SZ560852
- Civil parish: Newchurch
- Unitary authority: Isle of Wight
- Ceremonial county: Isle of Wight
- Region: South East
- Country: England
- Sovereign state: United Kingdom
- Post town: SANDOWN
- Postcode district: PO36
- Dialling code: 01983
- Police: Hampshire and Isle of Wight
- Fire: Hampshire and Isle of Wight
- Ambulance: Isle of Wight
- UK Parliament: Isle of Wight East

Newchurch is a village and civil parish on the Isle of Wight. It is located between Sandown and Newport in the southeast of the island.

== History ==
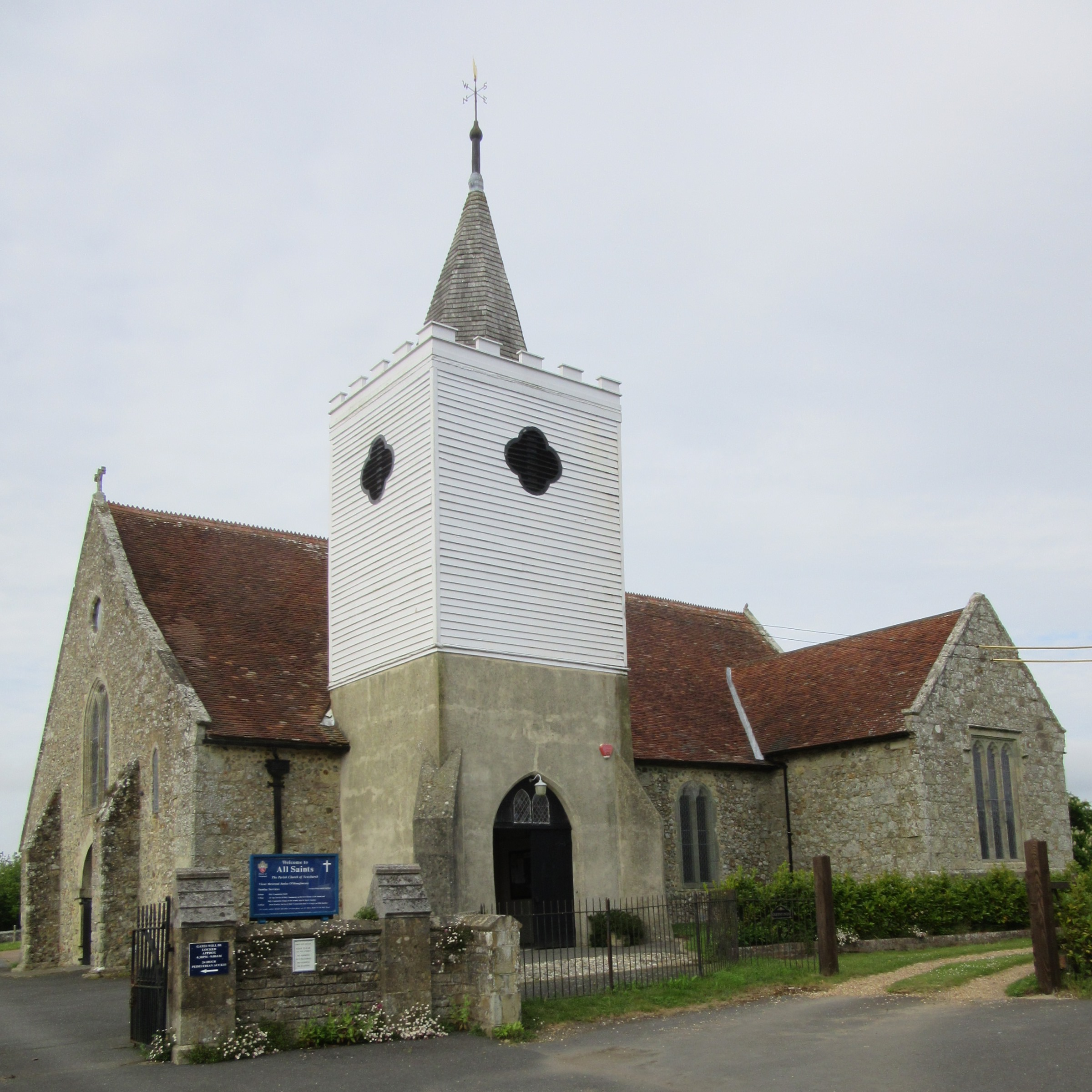
All Saints Church exterior view

Anthony Dillington, owner of the Knighton Gorges Manor in Newchurch wrote to his son Robert in 1574 that, "This is the very Garden of England, and we be privileged to work in it as Husbandmen......."

Newchurch obtained its name from All Saints' Church, built in 1087 by the Norman monks of Lyra. The Newchurch Parish for many centuries stretched from the north to south coasts of the Island; by the early Nineteenth Century the growing resort towns of Ventnor and Ryde were included within its boundaries. The parish was administered by the Church Parish Vestry until 1894 when civil matters were passed to the newly formed Parish Council which now forms the second tier of Local Government under the Isle of Wight Council. In 1982 Alverstone was included in the civil parish.

The present day parish includes Newchurch Village, Apse Heath, Winford, Whiteley Bank, Alverstone, Alverstone Garden Village, Queen's Bower, Princelett and Mersley.

== Transport ==
Public transport is provided by Southern Vectis bus route 22, operating between Newchurch and Shanklin. Wightbus used to operate bus route 23 between Newport and Shanklin but this was discontinued when Wightbus ceased operations. The Sustrans route 23 cycle route also runs through the village at the bottom of the Shute, allowing easy access to Cowes, Newport and Sandown. Between 1875 and 1956 Newchurch had the advantage of a railway station.

== Amenities ==
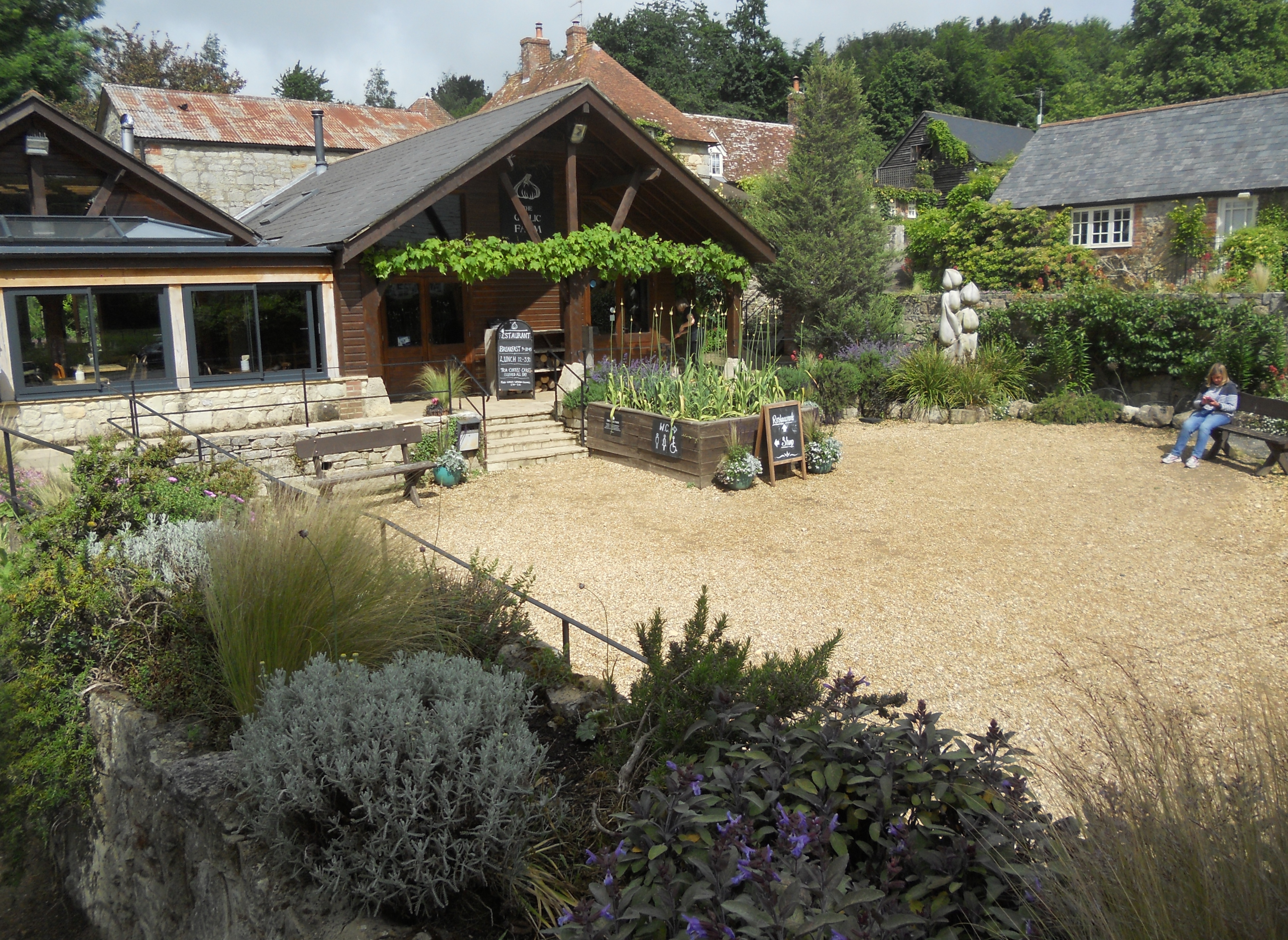
Restaurant entrance, Garlic Farm, Newchurch

There is a pub called "The Pointer Inn" and a post office.

The Garlic Farm is a garlic farm visitor attraction with farm shop and restaurant.

== Twin town ==
- Villainville, Normandy, France

== See also ==
- All Saints' Church, Newchurch
