= 1995 Women's World Championship (snooker) =

Women's snooker event, held 1995

Tournament information
- Dates: 7–10 September 1995
- Venue: Siri Fort Sports Complex
- City: New Delhi
- Country: India
- Organisation: World Ladies Billiards and Snooker Association
- Format: Single elimination
- Winner's share: £5,000
- Highest break: Karen Corr (NIR) (108)

Final
- Champion: Karen Corr (NIR)
- Runner-up: Kim Shaw (ENG)
- Score: 6–3

The 1995 Women's World Championship was a women's snooker tournament organised by the World Ladies Billiards and Snooker Association. The quarter-finals onwards were held in New Delhi from 7 to 10 September 1995. The event is recognised as the 1995 edition of the World Women's Snooker Championship first held in 1976. Karen Corr defeated Kim Shaw 6–3 in the final to win the title. The event was promoted by Barry Hearn's Matchroom company.

== Qualifying ==
The preliminary round and the four main rounds of qualifying took place at Raunds Cue Sports Club. Seven of the top eight seeds qualified for the quarter-finals, the only exception being Sarah Smith, who was beaten by June Banks. Defending champion Allison Fisher won her two qualifying matches without losing a frame. The highest break of the qualifying rounds was 86 by Lisa Quick.

== Final stages ==
The matches from the quarter-finals onwards were due to be played in India in June 1995, but were delayed. The original sponsors were gin producers Highball, but the Indian government imposed a ban on events sponsored by alcohol companies. The rescheduled event planned July was also postponed. The event was then planned to take place from 7 to 10 September with sponsorship from Woodall shoes.

The quarter-finals onwards were played at the Siri Fort Sports Complex, New Delhi. Kim Shaw beat Allison Fisher 5–3 in their semi-final, having led 3–0 before Fisher took the next to make it 3–2. Corr beat Kelly Fisher 5–2 in the other semi-final. In the final, Corr built a 3–0 lead, but Shaw won three of the next four to leave Corr only one frame ahead at 4–3. Corr then took the next two to claim victory at 6–3. As winner, Corr received a motorcycle from event sponsors Honda in addition to £5,000. She also took the highest break prize of £300 for her 108 against Banks. Shaw earned £2,000 as runner-up. It was Corr's second world title, after her first in 1990.

== Prize Fund ==
- Winner: £5,000
- Runner-up £2,000
- Semi-final: £1,000
- Quarter-final: £500
- Last 16: £100
- Last 32: £75
- Last 48: £50
- Last 64: £25
- Highest break: £300

== Main Draw ==
Fourth round Best of 9 frames
(England) Allison Fisher	5
(England) Georgina Aplin	0
(England) Mandy Fisher	0
(England) Lisa Quick	5
(England) Tessa Davidson	5
(England) Caroline Walch	0
(Scotland) Lynette Horsburgh	4
(England) Kim Shaw	5
(England) Kelly Fisher	5
(England) Teresa Carlisle	0
(England) Emma Bonney	0
(England) Ann-Marie Farren	5
(England) Sarah Smith	2
(England) June Banks	5
(Northern Ireland) Karen Corr	5
(Wales) Sharon Dickson	0

Quarter-finals; Best of 7 frames
(England) Allison Fisher	4
(England) Lisa Quick	1
(England) Tessa Davidson	2
(England) Kim Shaw	4
(England) Kelly Fisher	4
(England) Ann-Marie Farren	2
(England) June Banks	0
(Northern Ireland) Karen Corr	4

Semi-finals; Best of 9 frames
(England) Allison Fisher	3
(England) Kim Shaw	5
(England) Kelly Fisher	2
(Northern Ireland) Karen Corr	5

Final; Best of 11 frames
(England) Kim Shaw	3
(Northern Ireland) Karen Corr	6

== Final ==
Final: Best-of-11 frames. 10 September 1995 (India) New Delhi.
Kim Shaw (England)			3–6		Karen Corr (Northern Ireland)				
Frame	1	2	3	4	5	6	7	8	9
Kim Shaw; 40+ Breaks	7 -	50 -	10 -	69 -	70; 65	8 -	79; 47	20 -	42 -
Karen Corr; 40+ Breaks	98; 76	60; 48	73; 43	62 -	2 -	51 -	0 -	73 -	63 -
Frames won (Shaw first)	0–1	0–2	0–3	1–3	2–3	2–4	3–4	3–5	3–6
65			Highest break		74				
2			40+ breaks		3				
Karen Corr wins the 1995 Women's World Championship

== Early rounds ==
=== Preliminary round ===
(England) Lisa Ingall 4–2 Hilary Isitt (Wales)

=== Rounds 1 to 3 ===
First Round; Best of 7 frames
(England) Michelle Winn	1
(England) Lisa Ingall	4
(England) Natalie Chatfield	4
(Isle of Man) Yvonne Lally	0
(England) Tracey Warren	4
(England) Jan Hughes	0
(Canada) Anita Morra	4
(Belgium) Miranda Wauters	0
(Belgium) Valerie van Bellingham	4
(England) Martina Lumsden	2
(England) Marianne Lazarides	4
(England) Debra Bentley	3
(England) Lisa Gordon	4
(Republic of Ireland) Ann McMahon	3
(Canada) Maryann McConnell	4
(England) Jean Bedford	0
(England) Jan Pomphrey	4
(England) Nicola Barker	3
(England) Rachel Ozier	4
(England) Lyn Cast	0
(Belgium) Lilliane van Riel	4
(England) Maureen Twomey	2
(England) Sue Parrish	4
(England) Dawn Wells	2
(Wales) Janie Watkins	w.o.
(Republic of Ireland) Laura Ronan
(England) Christine Sharpe	4
(England) Debbie Singleton	3
(Republic of Ireland) Margaret Campion	4
(Belgium) Carina Andries	0
(Norway) Anita Rizzuti	4
(Republic of Ireland) Margaret Browne	0

Second Round; Best of 7 frames
(England) Mary Hawkes	1
(England) Lisa Ingall	4
(England) Maria Tart	4
(England) Natalie Chatfield	0
(England) Laura Stoddard	4
(England) Tracy Warren	3
(England) Helen Lazell	4
(Canada) Anita Morra	0
(England) Gaye Jones	1
(Belgium) Valerie van Bellingham	4
(Scotland) Julie Gillespie	4
(England) Marianne Lazarides	1
(England) Jenny Poulter	4
(England) Lisa Gordon	3
(England) Beverley Hipwell	1
(Canada) Maryann McConnell	4
(England) Sue Selby	2
(England) Jan Pomphrey	4
(England) Teresa Carlisle	4
(England) Rachel Ozier	1
(England) Emma Bonney	4
(Belgium) Lilliane van Riel	2
(England) Michelle Brown	4
(England) Sue Parrish	2
(Isle of Man) Jane Holland	4
(Wales) Janie Watkins	0
(England) Julie Billings	4
(England) Christine Sharpe	0
(England) C. Jolly	1
(Republic of Ireland) Margaret Campion	4
(England) Mary Talbot	3
(Norway) Anita Rizzuti	4

Third Round; Best of 7 frames
(England) Allison Fisher	4
(England) Lisa Ingall	0
(England) Georgina Aplin	4
(England) Maria Tart	3
(England) Mandy Fisher	4
(England) Laura Stoddard	2
(England) Lisa Quick	4
(England) Helen Lazell	0
(England) Tessa Davidson	4
(Belgium) Valerie van Bellingham	0
(England) Caroline Walch	4
(Scotland) Julie Gillespie	0
(Scotland) Lynette Horsburgh	4
(England) Jenny Poulter	0
(England) Kim Shaw	4
(Canada) Maryann McConnell	1
(England) Kelly Fisher	4
(England) Jan Pomphrey	0
(Republic of Ireland) Julie Kelly	1
(England) Teresa Carlisle	4
(England) Helen Audus	1
(England) Emma Bonney	4
(England) Ann-Marie Farren	4
(England) Michelle Browne	3
(England) Sarah Smith	4
(Isle of Man) Jane Holland	0
(England) June Banks	4
(England) Julie Billings	0
(Wales) Sharon Dickson	4
(Republic of Ireland) Margaret Campion	0
(Northern Ireland) Karen Corr	4
(Norway) Anita Rizzuti	1
