= 1994 Women's World Snooker Championship =

Women's World Snooker Championship
Tournament information
- Dates: May 1994
- Venue: Meridien Hotel (final stages)
- City: New Delhi (final stages)
- Country: India
- Organisation: World Ladies Billiards and Snooker Association
- Format: Single elimination
- Winner's share: £7,500
- Highest break: 108 (Stacey Hillyard)

Final
- Champion: (England) Allison Fisher
- Runner-up: (England) Stacey Hillyard
- Score: 7–3

The 1994 Women's World Snooker Championship was a women's snooker tournament played in the United Kingdom and India in 1994 and was that year's edition of the Women's World Snooker Championship first held in 1976. The early rounds were played at the Cue Sports Snooker Club in Raunds, Northamptonshire and the quarter-finals onwards were played at the Meridien Hotel, New Delhi. Defending champion Allison Fisher beat Stacey Hillyard 7–3 in the final to take the title, her seventh and last Women's World Snooker Championship win.

== Tournament summary ==
=== Early rounds ===
The initial rounds of the tournament, up to the fourth round (last 16) were held at the Cue Sports Snooker Club in Raunds, Northamptonshire. Of the top eight seeds, Allison Fisher, Karen Corr, Stacey Hillyard, Tessa Davidson and Kim Shaw qualified for the quarter-finals, whilst Ann-Marie Farren, Mandy Fisher and Lynette Horsburgh failed to get through. In the last 16 round, Farren was beaten 2–4 by Kelly Fisher after leading 2–0, Mandy Fisher lost 1–4 to Sarah Smith, and Horsburgh was defeated 1–4 by Sharon Dickson. Hillyard compiled the highest break of the competition, 108, in her third-round match against Gaye Jones. Defending champion Allison Fisher won 4–0 against both Valerie Dalgliesh and Julie Gillespie.

=== Quarter-finals ===
From the quarter-finals onwards, matches were held at the Meridien Hotel, New Delhi, the first time that the championship was held outside of the United Kingdom. The quarter-finals onwards were televised by Indian national television, and on Sky in the United Kingdom.

For the third match in succession in the tournament, Allison Fisher achieved a whitewash of her opponent, beating Sarah Smith 5–0 whilst making four breaks over 30 to lead 4–0 and then compiling a century in the final frame. Hillyard also had a 5–0 win, making four breaks over 30 in defeating Shaw. Davidson was 1–3 down to Kelly Fisher but then leveled at 3–3 and went ahead at 4–3. After Fisher won the eighth frame, Davidson took the decider with the aid of a 44 break. Corr was 1–3 down to Dickson before winning four frames in a row to win 5–3.

=== Semi-finals ===
Allison Fisher took a 3–1 lead against Davidson, then lost two of the next three to make it 4–3. Although Fisher won the next two frames and the match, she described it as "one of the toughest matches I've ever been involved in." Hillyard reached her sixth world championship final with a 6–3 win over Corr.

=== Final ===
In the first session, Fisher won the opening frame, but was then 2–1 and 3–2 behind. She drew level at 3–3 with a break of 102 in the sixth frame.

In the second session, Fisher won all four frames, including the tenth on a re-spotted black to gain her seventh world snooker title in nine years. and the last time that she won the championship. The match featured breaks over 30 in nine of the ten frames was seen as closer than the result suggested It was the seventh and last time that Fisher won the title.

=== Prize money ===
Source: Snooker Scene Winner (Allison Fisher): £7,500 Runner-up (Stacey Hillyard): £2,500 Losing semi-finalists: £1,000 Losing quarter-finalists: £500 Fourth round losers: £250 Third round losers: £100 Second Round losers: £75 First Round losers: £50 Highest Break (Stacey Hillyard, 108): £400

== Main draw ==
Source: Snooker Scene

Premliminary round Best-of-7 frames
(Scotland) Valerie Dalgliesh	4
(England) Michelle Brown	2
(Belgium) Valerie Van Bellinghen	w.o.
(England) Julie Noon
(Republic of Ireland) Margaret Browne	4
(England) Beverley Hipwell	3
(England) Dawn Wells	4
(Republic of Ireland) Laura Ronan	0
(England) Pam Beevers	4
(Belgium) Cinde De Wulf	3
(England) Nichola Barker	4
(England) Christine Sharpe	2
(England) Tracey Warren	4
(England) Marianne Lazarides	3
(Canada) Anita Kuczma	4
(England) Natalie Chatfield	1
(Isle of Man) Jane Moss	4
(Republic of Ireland) Annette McFaul	0
(England) Martina Lumsden	4
(England) Victoria Carter	0
(Belgium) Christine Leclercq	4
(England) Sue Selby	1
(England) Susan Parrish	4
(England) Jena Bedford	1
(England) Mary Winn	4
(England) Michelle Winn	2
(England) Mary Talbot	4
(England) Debbie Singleton	2
(England) Sarah Ellerby	4
(Norway) Anita Rizzuti	2
(England) Helen Lazell	4
(Republic of Ireland) Greta Brown	1

First round Best-of-7 frames
(Scotland) Valerie Dalgliesh	4
(Belgium) Valerie Van Bellinghen	0
(Republic of Ireland) Margaret Browne	1
(England) Dawn Wells	4
(England) Pam Beevers	4
(England) Nicola Barker	2
(England) Tracey Warren	0
(Canada) Anita Kuczma	4
(Isle of Man) Jane Moss	4
(England) Martina Lumsden	2
(Belgium) Christine Leclercq	4
(England) Susan Parrish	2
(England) Mary Winn	2
(England) Mary Talbot	4
(England) Sarah Ellerby	3
(England) Helen Lazell	4
(England) Louise King	4
(England) Lyn Cast	3
(Republic of Ireland) Anne McMahon	4
(Belgium) Miranda Wauters	?
(England) Nicola Golley	4
(England) Claire Heseldine	0
(Belgium) Liliane Van Riel	4
(England) Doreen Buckton	0
(Belgium) Martin Vanderaenden	4
(England) Sheila Pook	1
(Republic of Ireland) Paula Darby	w.o.
(Netherlands) Saskia Smits
(England) Laura Stoddard	4
(England) Maureen Twomey	1
(England) Julie Billings	4
(England) Rachel Ozier	3

Second round Best-of-7 frames
(England) Mary Hawkes	0
(Scotland) Valerie Dalgliesh	4
(Australia) Kathy Parashis	4
(England) Dawn Wells	0
(England) Carla Jolly	4
(England) Pam Beevers	1
(England) Teresa Carlisle	3
(Canada) Anita Kuczma	4
(Republic of Ireland) Julie Kelly	4
(Isle of Man) Jane Moss	1
(England) Jenny Poulter	4
(Belgium) Christine Leclercq	2
(England) Maria Tart	4
(England) Mary Talbot	0
(England) Kirsten Miners	4
(England) Helen Lazell	1
(England) Gaye Jones	4
(England) Louise King	3
(England) Helen Audus	4
(Republic of Ireland) Ann McMahon	1
(England) Lisa Gordon	4
(England) Nicola Golley	3
(Republic of Ireland) Margaret Campion	4
(Belgium) Liliane Van Riel	1
(England) Emma Bonney	4
(Belgium) Martin Vanderaenden	2
(Canada) Maureen Seto	4
(Republic of Ireland) Paula Darby	2
(Canada) Maryann McConnell	4
(England) Laura Stoddard	3
(England) Jane O'Neill	1
(England) Julie Billings	4

Third round Best-of-7 frames
(England) Allison Fisher	4
(Scotland) Valerie Dalgliesh	0
(Scotland) Julie Gillespie	4
(Australia) Kathy Parashis	0
(England) Sarah Smith	4
(England) Carla Jolly	2
(England) Mandy Fisher	4
(Canada) Anita Kuczma	2
(England) Ann-Marie Farren	4
(Republic of Ireland) Julie Kelly	1
(England) Kelly Fisher	4
(England) Jenny Poulter	0
(England) Caroline Walch	4
(England) Maria Tart	0
(England) Tessa Davidson	4
(England) Kirsten Miners	1
(England) Stacey Hillyard	4
(England) Gaye Jones	0
(England) Georgina Aplin	3
(England) Helen Audus	4
(England) Lisa Quick	3
(England) Lisa Gordon	4
(England) Kim Shaw	4
(Republic of Ireland) Margaret Campion	2
(Scotland) Lynette Horsburgh	4
(England) Emma Bonney	2
(Wales) Sharon Dickson	4
(Canada) Maureen Seto	1
(England) June Banks	4
(Canada) Maryann McConnell	2
(Northern Ireland) Karen Corr	4
(England) Julie Billings	0

Fourth round Best-of-7 frames
(England) Allison Fisher	4
(Scotland) Julie Gillespie	0
(England) Sarah Smith	4
(England) Mandy Fisher	1
(England) Ann-Marie Farren	2
(England) Kelly Fisher	4
(England) Caroline Walch	2
(England) Tessa Davidson	4
(England) Stacey Hillyard	4
(England) Helen Audus	1
(England) Lisa Gordon	2
(England) Kim Shaw	4
(Scotland) Lynette Horsburgh	1
(Wales) Sharon Dickson	4
(England) June Banks	1
(Northern Ireland) Karen Corr	4

Quarter-finals; Best-of-9 frames
(England) Allison Fisher	5
(England) Sarah Smith	0
(England) Kelly Fisher	4
(England) Tessa Davidson	5
(England) Stacey Hillyard	5
(England) Kim Shaw	0
(Wales) Sharon Dickson	3
(Northern Ireland) Karen Corr	5

Semi-finals; Best-of-11 frames
(England) Allison Fisher	6
(England) Tessa Davidson	3
(England) Stacey Hillyard	6
(Northern Ireland) Karen Corr	3

Final; Best-of-13 frames
(England) Allison Fisher	7
(England) Stacey Hillyard	3

=== Final ===
Source: Snooker Scene

Final: Best-of-13 frames Meridien Hotel, New Delhi
Allison Fisher (England)			7–3			Stacey Hillyard (England)				
Frame	1	2	3	4	5	6	7	8	9	10
Allison Fisher; 30+ Breaks	70; 45	42; 42	35 -	75; 40	49 -	107; 102	68 -	63; 30, 33	78; 60	77; 44
Stacey Hillyard; 30+ Breaks	36 -	80; 60	73; 67	30 -	60 -	2 -	39; 34	52; 40	38 -	70; 44
Frames won (Fisher first)	1–0	1–1	1–2	2–2	2–3	3–3	4–3	5–3	6–3	7–3
102			Highest break			67				
1			Century breaks			0				
1			50+ breaks			2				
6			30+ breaks			3				
Allison Fisher wins the 1994 Women's World Snooker Championship
