= 1997 Women's World Snooker Championship =

Amateur snooker championship, held 1996 and 1997

Women's World Snooker Championship
Tournament information
- Venue: Raunds Cue Sports Club and Terry Griffiths Matchroom
- City: Northamptonshire and Llanelli
- Country: United Kingdom
- Organisation: World Ladies Billiards and Snooker Association
- Format: Single elimination
- Highest break: 87 (Karen Corr)

Final
- Champion: Karen Corr
- Runner-up: Kelly Fisher
- Score: 6–3

The 1997 World Women's Snooker Championship was a women's snooker tournament held in 1997.

== Tournament summary ==
The tournament started as the 1996 World Championship, but due to delays in the scheduling of the later rounds, it became the 1997 Championship. It was promoted by Barry Hearn who had been promoting the Women's world championship since 1990. The defending champion was Karen Corr. There were 52 players who entered the tournament. Allison Fisher who had won the title seven times, most recently in 1994, did not enter as she has moved to the United States where she had embarked on a successful pool career. 1984 amateur champion and five-times runner-up Stacey Hillyard had retired from competition and so was another non-participant. The original schedule was for the quarter-finals onwards to be held in India, as they had been in 1994 and 1995, from 16 to 19 September 1996, but eventually the final rounds took place in Llanelli, with the semi-finals and final not happening until well into 1997.

This was the last women's world snooker championship to be held before the World Ladies Billiards and Snooker Association amalgamated with the WPBSA later in 1997.

=== Rounds 1 to 4 ===
The tournament started as the 1996 World Championship. The first four rounds took place at Raunds Cue Sports Club, Northamptonshire, to decide the eight players that would go on to contest the quarter-finals onwards, which were expected to be played in Bombay in mid-September 1996. Defending champion Karen Corr won her first match without losing a frame but won only on the final black in the deciding frame of her match against Lynette Horsburgh. Second seed Kelly Fisher and 1995 runner-up Kim Shaw both won both of their matches 4–0. Mary Talbot, ranked 26th, was a surprising quarter-finalist, beating 7th seed Sarah Smith and 12th ranked player Helen Audus. The highest break in the main qualifying was a 77 by Ann-Marie Farren. A plate competition was held for players who did not qualify to the quarter-finals and was won by Horsburgh, who made a break of 100 in the first round of the plate competition.

=== Quarter-finals ===
Following postponements of the final stages and a lack of response from promoter Barry Hearn's partner in India, it was decided to hold the quarter-finals at the Terry Griffiths Matchroom, Llanelli, and they took place in November 1996. Corr whitewashed 1984 professional champion Mandy Fisher 4–0. Banks saw off 1987 champion Farren 4–2, and Lisa Quick beat Shaw 4–1. Fisher's match with Talbot was delayed due to Talbot's illness, with Fisher winning 4–1. Meanwhile, Hearn requested the termination of his contract with the WLBSA to promote the event in future.

=== Semi-finals and Final ===
The semi-finals and final were eventually scheduled to be held in Llanelli in mid-1997, following a continued lack of communication from Hearn's partner in India. Corr made the highest break of the competition, 87, and three other breaks over 30 in overcoming Banks 5–0. Quick won the first frame against Fisher, but no more, losing 1–5. The final between Corr and Fisher was closely contested until 3–3 but then Corr won three frames in a row to take her third world title. The tournament finished some eleven months after the start of the qualifying matches, and was the end of promoter Hearn's relationship with women's snooker that stretched back to 1990.

This was the last world championship to be held before the amalgamation of the World Ladies Billiards and Snooker Association with the WPBSA a few months later. The intention was that major finals for women should be played at the same venues as the men's events, for example the women's world championship final being held at the Crucible Theatre during the World Snooker Championship.

== Results ==
Source: Snooker Scene

=== First round ===
At Raunds Cue Sports Club. Matches were best-of-7 frames.

	Score	
(Scotland) Lynette Horsburgh	4–2	Zena Latcham (England)
(Australia) Kathy Parashis	4–1	Valerie Finnie (Scotland)
(England) Clare Rodgers	4–0	Vicki Revell (England)
(England) Natalie Chatfield	4–0	Jane O'Neill (England)

=== Second round to Final ===
Second round Best-of-7 frames Raunds Cue Sports Club
(England) Maureen Twomey	4
(England) Mary Hawkes	2
(England) Beverley Hipwell	0
(Scotland) Lynette Horsburgh	4
(England) Sue Parrish	4
(England) Lisa Ingall	2
(England) Jan Hughes	4
(England) Marianne Lazarides	1
(England) Sherron Audus	4
(Republic of Ireland) Greta Browne	3
(England) Dawn Wells	4
(Scotland) Jackie Stewart	0
(Belgium) Valerie Van Bellinghen	0
(Australia) Kathy Parashis	4
(Finland) Riitta Koskinen	4
(England) Tracey Warren	3
(Scotland) Julie Gillespie	4
(England) Louise Leskevicius	0
(England) Katie Henrick	0
(England) Clare Rodgers	4
(England) Martina Lumsden	4
(England) Doreen Buckton	0
(England) Gaye Jones	4
(Finland) Tuija Tiihonen	0
(England) Mary Talbot	4
(England) Nicola Barker	0
(England) Rachel Ozier	w.o.
(Canada) Anita Morra	scr.
(England) Liz Jones	3
(England) Natalie Chatfield	4
(England) Lisa Gordon	4
(England) Sue Selby	1

Third round Best-of-7 frames Raunds Cue Sports Club
(Northern Ireland) Karen Corr	4
(England) Maureen Twomey	0
(England) Emma Bonney	1
(Scotland) Lynette Horsburgh	4
(England) Caroline Walch	3
(England) Sue Parrish	4
(England) Mandy Fisher	4
(England) Jan Hughes	1
(England) June Banks	4
(England) Sherron Audus	1
(England) Julie Billings	1
(England) Dawn Wells	4
(Scotland) Michelle Brown	0
(Australia) Kathy Parashis	4
(England) Ann-Marie Farren	4
(Finland) Riitta Koskinen	0
(England) Kim Shaw	4
(Scotland) Julie Gillespie	0
(England) Jenny Poulter	4
(England) Clare Rodgers	0
(Republic of Ireland) Julie Kelly	4
(England) Martina Lumsden	1
(England) Lisa Quick	4
(England) Gaye Jones	1
(England) Sarah Smith	3
(England) Mary Talbot	4
(England) Helen Audus	4
(England) Rachel Ozier	0
(England) Laura Stoddard	4
(England) Natalie Chatfield	1
(England) Kelly Fisher	4
(England) Lisa Gordon	0

Fourth round Best-of-7 frames Raunds Cue Sports Club
(Northern Ireland) Karen Corr	4
(Scotland) Lynette Horsburgh	3
(England) Sue Parrish	2
(England) Mandy Fisher	4
(England) June Banks	4
(England) Dawn Wells	0
(Australia) Kathy Parashis	0
(England) Ann-Marie Farren	4
(England) Kim Shaw	4
(England) Jenny Poulter	0
(Republic of Ireland) Julie Kelly	1
(England) Lisa Quick	4
(England) Mary Talbot	4
(England) Helen Audus	1
(England) Laura Stoddard	0
(England) Kelly Fisher	4

Quarter-finals; Best-of-7 frames Terry Griffiths Matchroom
(Northern Ireland) Karen Corr	4
(England) Mandy Fisher	0
(England) June Banks	4
(England) Ann-Marie Farren	2
(England) Kim Shaw	1
(England) Lisa Quick	4
(England) Mary Talbot	1
(England) Kelly Fisher	4

Semi-finals; Best-of-9 frames Terry Griffiths Matchroom
(Northern Ireland) Karen Corr	5
(England) June Banks	0
(England) Kelly Fisher	5
(England) Lisa Quick	1

Final; Best-of-11 frames Terry Griffiths Matchroom
(Northern Ireland) Karen Corr	6
(England) Kelly Fisher	3

=== Final ===
Final: Best-of-11 frames Terry Griffiths Matchroom, Llanelli
Karen Corr (Northern Ireland)		6–3			Kelly Fisher (England)				
Frame	1	2	3	4	5	6	7	8	9
Karen Corr; 30+ Breaks	41 -	74 -	63 -	27 -	67 -	41 -	88 -	47 -	105 (33,58)
Kelly Fisher; 30+ Breaks	53 -	32 -	49 (32)	71 (31)	43 -	58 -	52 -	25 -	3 -
Frames won (Corr first)	0–1	1–1	2–1	2–2	3–2	3–3	4–3	5–3	6–3
58		Highest break			32				
1		50+ breaks							
1		30+ breaks			2				
Karen Corr wins the 1997 World Women's Snooker Championship
