= 2000 World Women's Snooker Championship =

Women's snooker event

Tournament information
- Dates: 17-23 April 2000
- Venue: Crucible Theatre (for the semi-finals and final)
- City: Sheffield
- Country: England
- Organisation: World Ladies Billiards and Snooker Association
- Format: Single elimination

Final
- Champion: Kelly Fisher (ENG)
- Runner-up: Lisa Ingall (ENG)
- Score: 4–1

The 2000 Women's World Snooker Championship was a women's snooker tournament. It was the 2000 edition of the World Women's Snooker Championship, first held in 1976.

The tournament was won by Kelly Fisher, who retained the title by defeating Lisa Ingall 4–1 in the final. This was the third year in succession that Fisher won the title. The rounds before the semi-final were played at the Radion Executive Club, Sheffield, and the semi-finals and final were played at the Crucible Theatre.

== Main Draw ==
Best of 7 frames

Last 32
(England) Kelly Fisher	4
(Belgium) Wendy Jans	0
(England) Juliette Lushey	4
(France) Sandrine Vlamynck	1
(England) Helen Audus	4
(England) Lorraine Field	2
(England) Caroline Walch	4
(France) Angelique Vialard	1
(England) June Banks	4
(England) Maria Tart	0
(England) Mandy Fisher	4
(Belgium) Candide Binon	1
(England) Maria Catalano	4
(England) Christine Sharpe	0
(England) Kim Shaw	4
(Scotland) Julie Gillespie	2
(England) Lisa Quick	4
(Belgium) Caty Dehaene	0
(England) Michelle Brown	4
(England) Nicola Barker	0
(England) Katie Henrick	2
(England) Mary Talbot	4
(England) Lisa Ingall	4
(Belgium) Eva Palmius	0
(England) Emma Bonney	1
(Australia) Kathy Parashis	4
(England) Jenny Poulter	0
(Wales) Sharon Dickson	4
(England) Sarah Clarke	4
(Australia) Samantha Ridley	2
(Scotland) Lynette Horsburgh	4
(England) Martina Lumsden	0

Last 16
(England) Kelly Fisher	4
(England) Juliette Lushey	2
(England) Helen Audus	4
(England) Caroline Walch	3
(England) June Banks	4
(England) Mandy Fisher	2
(England) Maria Catalano	1
(England) Kim Shaw	4
(England) Lisa Quick	4
(England) Michelle Brown	1
(England) Mary Talbot	1
(England) Lisa Ingall	4
(Australia) Kathy Parashis	0
(Wales) Sharon Dickson	4
(England) Sarah Clarke	1
(Scotland) Lynette Horsburgh	4

Quarter-finals
(England) Kelly Fisher	4
(England) Helen Audus	0
(England) June Banks	1
(England) Kim Shaw	4
(England) Lisa Quick	2
(England) Lisa Ingall	4
(Wales) Sharon Dickson	4
(Scotland) Lynette Horsburgh	3

Semi-finals
(England) Kelly Fisher	4
(England) Kim Shaw	1
(England) Lisa Ingall	4
(Wales) Sharon Dickson	2

Final
(England) Kelly Fisher	4
(England) Lisa Ingall	1
