= Ellerby =

Ellerby may refer to:

== Places ==
- Ellerby, East Riding of Yorkshire
- Ellerby, North Yorkshire
- New Ellerby, East Riding of Yorkshire

== People ==
The surname of Ellerby is dervied from Ellerby in Swine (East Riding of Yorkshire) or Ellerby in Lythe (North Yorkshire). Variant surnames include Ellerbee.

- Keaton Ellerby (born 1988), Canadian ice hockey player
- Martin Ellerby (born 1957), English composer
- Sarah Ellerby (born 1975), English pool player
- Thomas Ellerby (1797–1861), English portrait artist
- Jessica Ellerby (born 1986), English actress, filmmaker, and yoga studio owner
