= 2001 Women's World Snooker Championship =

Women's snooker event, held April 2014

Tournament information
- Dates: April 2001
- Venue: Crucible Theatre
- City: Sheffield
- Country: England
- Organisation: World Ladies Billiards and Snooker
- Format: Single elimination
- Total prize fund: £5,000
- Winner's share: £2,500
- Highest break: 119 ( Kelly Fisher (ENG)

Final
- Champion: Lisa Quick (ENG)
- Runner-up: Lynette Horsburgh (SCO)
- Score: 4–2

The 2001 Women's World Snooker Championship was a women's snooker tournament that took place in April 2001, with early rounds held at Jester's Snooker Club in Swindon, and the semi-finals and final played at the Crucible Theatre in Sheffield, England. The event was the 2001 edition of the World Women's Snooker Championship, first held in 1976. It was won by England's Lisa Quick, who defeated Scot Lynette Horsburgh 4–2 in the final. The defending champion and top-ranked women's player Kelly Fisher lost 3–4 to Sharon Dickson in the last 16. Fisher, who had won the world championship in each of the three preceding years, made the only century break of the competition, a 119 in her match against Nicola Barker.

Quick, ranked fifth, had previously won only one ranking tournament, the 1999 Regal Welsh, and it was the first time that Horsburgh, ranked second, had reached the world championship final in 16 attempts. It was level at 1–1 after the first two frames. Quick won the third frame on the black ball to lead 2–1, and then took the next frame by fluking the black. Horsburgh won the fifth frame to trail by one frame at 2–3, before Quick won the match by winning the next frame on the pink.

Quick had won the women's 1999 WEPF World Eightball Championship in blackball and with this victory became the first person in either the women's or the men's game to win world titles in both pool and snooker. She went on to win the WEPF World eightball again in June 2001, to become the first person to hold pool and snooker world titles concurrently. The competition was sponsored by cigarette company Embassy and attracted entrants from fourteen countries including Australia, Belgium, Brazil, England, France, India, Ireland, Japan, Scotland, Singapore, and Wales. The winner of the event won a prize of £5,000.

== Prize fund ==
Below is the prize money awarded at the event.

- Winner: £5,000
- Runner-up: £2,500
- Losing semi-finalists: £1,100
- Losing quarter-finalists: £600
- Last 16 losers: £200
- Last 32 losers: £100
- Highest break: £270

== Main draw ==
Last 32; Best of 7 frames
(England) Kelly Fisher	4
(England) Nicola Barker	0
(Wales) Sharon Dickson	4
(Republic of Ireland) M. O'Driscoll	3
(England) Helen Audus	4
(England) Mary Talbot	2
(England) Maria Catalano	4
(Singapore) V. Majmudar	1
(England) Lisa Quick	4
(England) Sarah Clarke	1
(England) Maria Tart	0
(England) Juliette Lushey	4
(Belgium) Wendy Jans	4
(England) Mandy Fisher	0
(England) Lisa Ingall	4
(Australia) Kathy Parashis	0
(England) June Banks	4
(Belgium) Isabelle Jonckheere	1
(Scotland) Julie Gillespie	4
(Belgium) Candide Binon	1
(England) Jenny Poulter	4
(India) Pooja Galundia	1
(England) Caroline Walch	4
(Belgium) Valerie Van Bellinghen	3
(England) Emma Bonney	4
(Australia) Samantha Ridley	0
(England) Katie Henrick	4
(England) K. Burt	0
(England) Christine Sharpe	4
(England) Michelle Brown	3
(France) Angelique Vialard	0
(Scotland) Lynette Horsburgh	4

Last 16; Best of 7 frames
(England) Kelly Fisher	3
(Wales) Sharon Dickson	4
(England) Helen Audus	3
(England) Maria Catalano	4
(England) Lisa Quick	4
(England) Juliette Lushey	0
(Belgium) Wendy Jans	1
(England) Lisa Ingall	4
(England) June Banks	4
(Scotland) Julie Gillespie	1
(England) Jenny Poulter	1
(England) Caroline Walch	4
(England) Emma Bonney	4
(England) Katie Henrick	3
(England) Christine Sharpe	0
(Scotland) Lynette Horsburgh	4

Quarter-finals; Best of 7 frames
(Wales) Sharon Dickson	4
(England) Maria Catalano	2
(England) Lisa Quick	4
(England) Lisa Ingall	3
(England) June Banks	4
(England) Caroline Walch	1
(England) Emma Bonney	2
(Scotland) Lynette Horsburgh	4

Semi-finals; Best of 7 frames
(Wales) Sharon Dickson	1
(England) Lisa Quick	4
(England) June Banks	1
(Scotland) Lynette Horsburgh	4

Final; Best of 7 frames
(England) Lisa Quick	4
(Scotland) Lynette Horsburgh	2
