= 1999 World Women's Snooker Championship =

Women's snooker event

Tournament information
- Dates: April 1999
- Venue: Crucible Theatre (for the semi-finals and final)
- City: Sheffield
- Country: England
- Organisation: World Ladies Billiards and Snooker Association
- Format: Single elimination

Final
- Champion: Kelly Fisher (ENG)
- Runner-up: Karen Corr (NIR)
- Score: 4–2

The 1999 Women's World Snooker Championship was a women's snooker tournament. It was the 1999 edition of the World Women's Snooker Championship, first held in 1976.

The tournament was won by Kelly Fisher, who retained the title by defeating Karen Corr 4–2 in the final. The rounds before the semi-final were played at the Radion Executive Club, Sheffield, and the semi-finals and final were played at the Crucible Theatre.

== Main Draw ==
Last 16; Best of 7 frames
Kelly Fisher (ENG)	4
Karin Brooks (SCO)	0
J. Lushey (ENG)	4
Jenny Poulter (ENG)	3
Kim Shaw (ENG)	4
Angelique Vialard (FRA)	0
Lynette Horsburgh (SCO)	4
Tessa Davidson (ENG)	3
Lisa Quick (ENG)	4
Julie Kelly (IRE)	3
June Banks (ENG)	4
Maria Catalano (ENG)	1
Lisa Ingall (ENG)	4
Emma Bonney (ENG)	3
Karen Corr (NIR)	4
S. Clark (ENG)	0

Quarter-finals; Best of 7 frames
Kelly Fisher (ENG)	4
J. Lushey (ENG)	0
Kim Shaw (ENG)	4
Lynette Horsburgh (SCO)	0
Lisa Quick (ENG)	4
June Banks (ENG)	2
Lisa Ingall (ENG)	0
Karen Corr (NIR)	4

Semi-finals; Best of 7 frames
Kelly Fisher (ENG)	4
Kim Shaw (ENG)	3
Lisa Quick (ENG)	2
Karen Corr (NIR)	4

Final; Best of 7 frames
Kelly Fisher (ENG)	4
Karen Corr (NIR)	2
