= 1998 Women's World Championship (snooker) =

Women's snooker event, held June 1998

Tournament information
- Dates: 1998
- Venue: Crucible Theatre
- City: Sheffield
- Country: England
- Organisation: World Ladies Billiards and Snooker Association
- Format: Single elimination
- Winner's share: £5,000
- Highest break: Kim Shaw (95)

Final
- Champion: Kelly Fisher (ENG)
- Runner-up: Karen Corr (NIR)
- Score: 5–0

The 1998 Women's World Championship was a women's snooker tournament organised by the World Ladies Billiards and Snooker Association. The event is recognised as the 1998 edition of the World Women's Snooker Championship first held in 1976. Kelly Fisher defeated Karen Corr 5–0 in the final to win the title.

The rounds leading up to the final were played at Radion Plaza, Sheffield, with the final played at the Crucible Theatre on a Sunday morning during the 1998 World Snooker Championship. Eight qualifying groups produced sixteen qualifiers who each faced one of the top sixteen seeds in the last 32 round. Defending champion Corr had won nine of the preceding events on the women's snooker circuit and had not lost to Fisher for 14 months before this tournament. However, Fisher took the title by whitewashing Corr in a rematch of the previous year's final. The highest break of the competition was 95, compiled by Kim Shaw in the last 32 round.

== Prize Fund ==
- Winner: £5,000
- Runner-up £2,500
- Semi-final: £1,000
- Quarter-final: £500
- Last 16: £175

== Main Draw ==
Last 16; Best of 7 frames
(Northern Ireland) Karen Corr	4
(England) Sheron Audus	0
(England) Tessa Davidson	4
(Scotland) Lynette Horsburgh	3
(England) Lisa Quick	4
(England) Lisa Ingall	2
(England) Caroline Walch	4
(England) June Banks	1
(England) Kim Shaw	4
(England) Helen Audus	1
(England) Mandy Fisher	4
(England) Emma Bonney	3
(England) Ann-Marie Farren	4
(England) Sarah Clarke	0
(England) Kelly Fisher	4
(England) Michelle Brown	0

Quarter-finals; Best of 7 frames
(Northern Ireland) Karen Corr	4
(England) Tessa Davidson	0
(England) Lisa Quick	4
(England) Caroline Walch	1
(England) Kim Shaw	4
(England) Mandy Fisher	2
(England) Ann-Marie Farren	2
(England) Kelly Fisher	4

Semi-finals; Best of 7 frames
(Northern Ireland) Karen Corr	4
(England) Lisa Quick	2
(England) Kim Shaw	3
(England) Kelly Fisher	4

Final; Best of 9 frames
(Northern Ireland) Karen Corr	0
(England) Kelly Fisher	5
