= Laura Hardy =

Laura Hardy may refer to:

- Laura Hardy (novelist), pseudonym of the British romantic novelist Sheila Holland (1937–2000)
- Laura Hardy (The Hardy Boys), a character in the Hardy Boys series
