= Ellerbee =

Ellerbee is a surname that is a variant of Ellerby.

Notable people and fictional characters with this surname include:

- Bobby Ellerbee, voice actor
- Derrell Ellerbee, character in Roman J. Israel, Esq.
- Emmanuel Ellerbee (born 1996), American footballer
- Garner Ellerbee, character in Baywatch
- Linda Ellerbee (born 1944), American journalist

== See also ==
- Ellerby (disambiguation)
