= Sue Thompson (pool player) =

Scottish pool player

Personal information
- Born: 10 October 1969 (age 56) Liverpool, England

Pool career
- Country: Scotland
- Turned pro: 1992–2012
- Pool games: 8-Ball

Tournament wins
- World Champion: WEPF world eightball champion 1996, 1997, 2000, 2002, 2003, 2004, 2006, 2007, 2009, 2010, 2012
- Highest rank: 1

Susan Thompson (born 10 October 1969), usually known professionally as Sue Thompson, is a Scottish former professional pool player. She won the WEPF World Eightball Championship eleven times.

== Career ==
Thompson started playing pool, aged 14, when a friend invited her into a pub for a game. The next year, Thompson had her own pool table and played for around twelve hours a day until the age of 19, winning the British Ladies Pool championship three times in four attempts.

She became a professional player in 1992, after winning a five-year battle against the Professional Pool Players Organisation's refusal to grant her professional status. An industrial tribunal in Leeds found that she had been the victim of sex discrimination, and gave the Professional Pool Players Organisation three months to admit her as a professional.

Thompson won the 1993 European Eight-ball championship on her 24th birthday, retaining her title from the previous year.

She reached the final of the WEPF World Eightball Championship in both 1994 and 1995, losing both times to Linda Leadbitter.

Thompson won her first world title with a 7–1 win over Rosalia Diliberto in the 1996 final. She gained her second the next year, with an 8–5 victory over Leadbitter in the final. 1998 saw Leadbitter win 8–6 over Thompson. They faced each other again in the final for the fifth time in 2000, with Thompson winning the match 8–5.

Thompson won again in 2002 and 2003, both being 8–3 wins over Lisa Quick, and with tournament wins in 2004, 2006, 2007, 2009, 2010 and 2012, won eleven world titles in all. WEPF Ladies World Masters Champion 2006, 2008, 2012 and runner-up in 2007.

At the 2012 WEPF World Eightball Championship, Thompson won 16 frames and lost only two whilst winning the title. She then announced her retirement from competitive play, aged 42, due to suffering from arthritis. She continued to play exhibition matches to raise funds for Macmillan Cancer Support. She achieved the world record for clearing all 15 balls, with a time of 37.7 seconds.

== Achievements ==
- WEPF World eightball champion 1996, 1997, 2000, 2002, 2003, 2004, 2006, 2007, 2009, 2010, 2012
- WEPF World Eightball Championship runner-up 1994, 1995, 1998, 2005
- WEPF Ladies World Masters champion 2006, 2008, 2012
- WEPF Ladies World Masters runner-up 2007
