= 2009 IBSF World Snooker Championship – Women's =

IBSF World Snooker Championship
Tournament information
- Dates: 15–24 November 2009
- Venue: Hyderabad International Convention Center Hall
- City: Hyderabad
- Country: India
- Organisation: International Billiards and Snooker Federation (IBSF)
- Format: Qualifying groups round-robin, followed by knockout.
- Highest break: Ng On-yee, 77

Final
- Champion: Ng On-yee
- Runner-up: Kathy Parashis
- Score: 5–2

The 2009 IBSF World Snooker Championship for women took place from 15 to 25 November 2009 at the Hyderabad International Convention Center Hall, Hyderabad. Ng On-yee won the tournament by defeating Kathy Parashis 5–2 in the final.

== Summary ==
The tournament was organised by the International Billiards and Snooker Federation. Defending champion Reanne Evans did not participate as she could not raise the funds to travel from England to India for the event. Participants were divided between four round-robin groups (three of six players each, and one with five players), with the top four from each group qualifying for the knockout stage. Vidya Pillai and Ramona Belmont both won all of their five group matches, and Yu Ching Ching won all four of hers. Ng and Parashis were both fourth-placed in their respective groups, and both recovered from 2–3 behind to defeat opponents in the semi-finals. Ng won the first frame of the final, but missed the final black ball in the second frame, which Parashis then potted to level the match. Ng took the next four frames, to secure the title. She made the highest break of the match, 36, in the last frame. When the score was 3–1, the organisers decided to conduct drug tests, which delayed the match for about 30 minutes. According to the report on Cue Sports India, Ng, who became the youngest International Billiards and Snooker Federation women's snooker champion, demonstrated "exceptional potting along with copy book safety"

Some players experienced stomach upsets. During the group stage, Santhinee Jaisuekul was taken to hospital after her match against Jaique Ip, and Nahla Sunni did not appear for her match against Chitra Magimairaj. There were only four breaks of over 50 points, Ng scored the highest break of the tournament, 77, and also recorded a 57. Bi Zhu Qing had breaks of 65 and 52. She won the third place play-off 3–2 against Ramona Belmont.

== Knockout Rounds ==
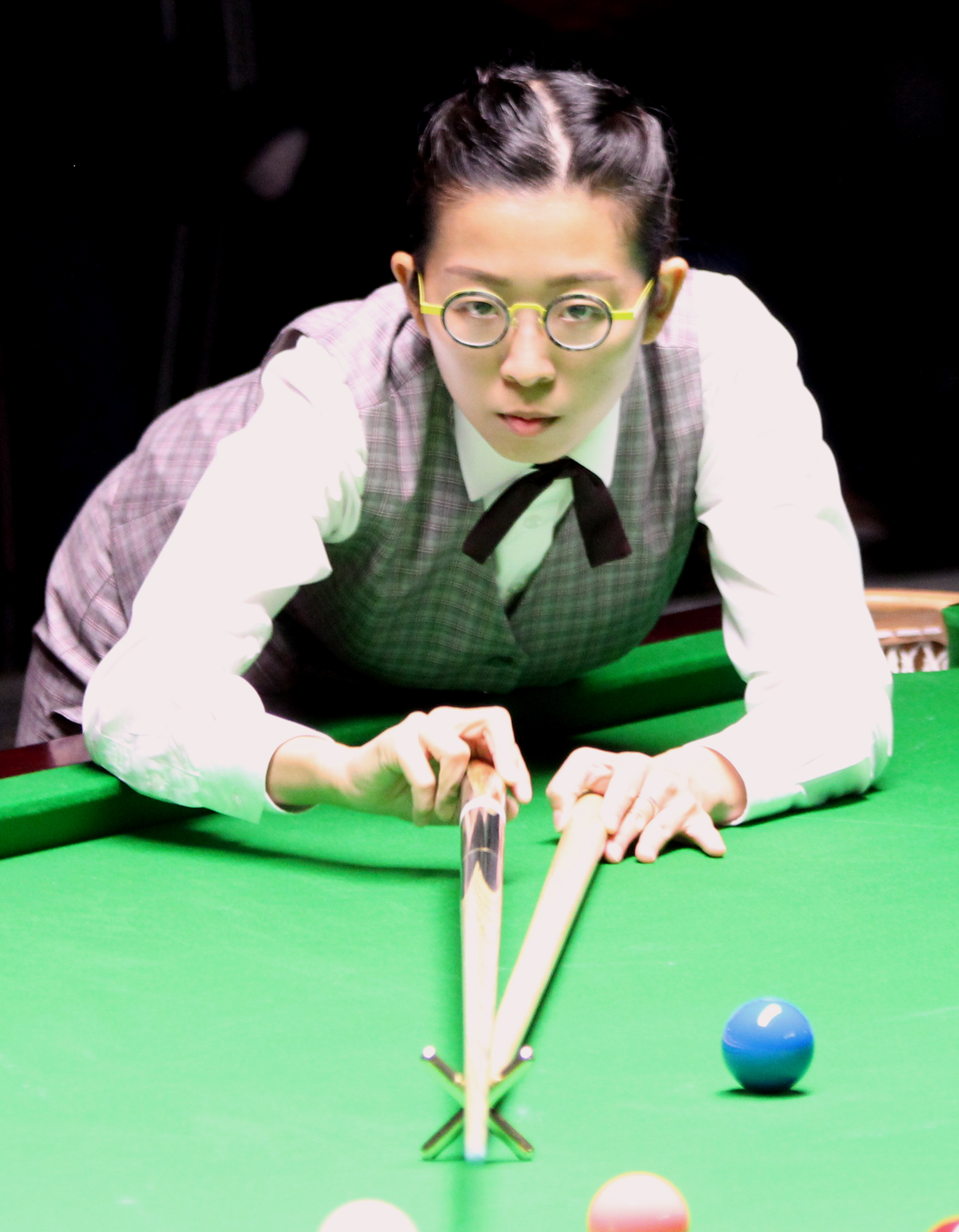
Ng On-yee (pictured in 2017) defeated Kathy Parashis in the final.

Results for the knockout stage are shown below.

Last 16
Vidya Pillai (IND)	3
Kathy Parashis (AUS)	4
Meenal Thakur (IND)	4
Anuja Chandra (IND)	3
Neena Praveen (IND)	1
Bi Zhu Qing (CHN)	4
Kathy Howden (AUS)	0
Jaique Ip (HKG)	4
Ramona Belmont (NZL)	4
Margaret Gorski (AUS)	1
Chitra Magimairaj (IND)	4
Nicha Pathom (THA)	2
Santhinee Jaisuekal (THA)	0
So Man Yan (HKG)	4
Ng On-yee (HKG)	4
Yu Ching Ching (HKG)	2

Quarter-finals
Kathy Parashis (AUS)	4
Meenal Thakur (IND)	2
Bi Zhu Qing (CHN)	4
Jaique Ip (HKG)	2
Ramona Belmont (NZL)	4
Chitra Magimairaj (IND)	1
So Man Yan (HKG)	1
Ng On-yee (HKG)	4

Semi-finals
Kathy Parashis (AUS)	4
Bi Zhu Qing (CHN)	3
Ramona Belmont (NZL)	3
Ng On-yee (HKG)	4

Final
Kathy Parashis (AUS)	1
Ng On-yee (HKG)	5
Third place
Bi Zhu Qing (CHN)	3
Ramona Belmont (NZL)	2
