= George Balmer =

English painter

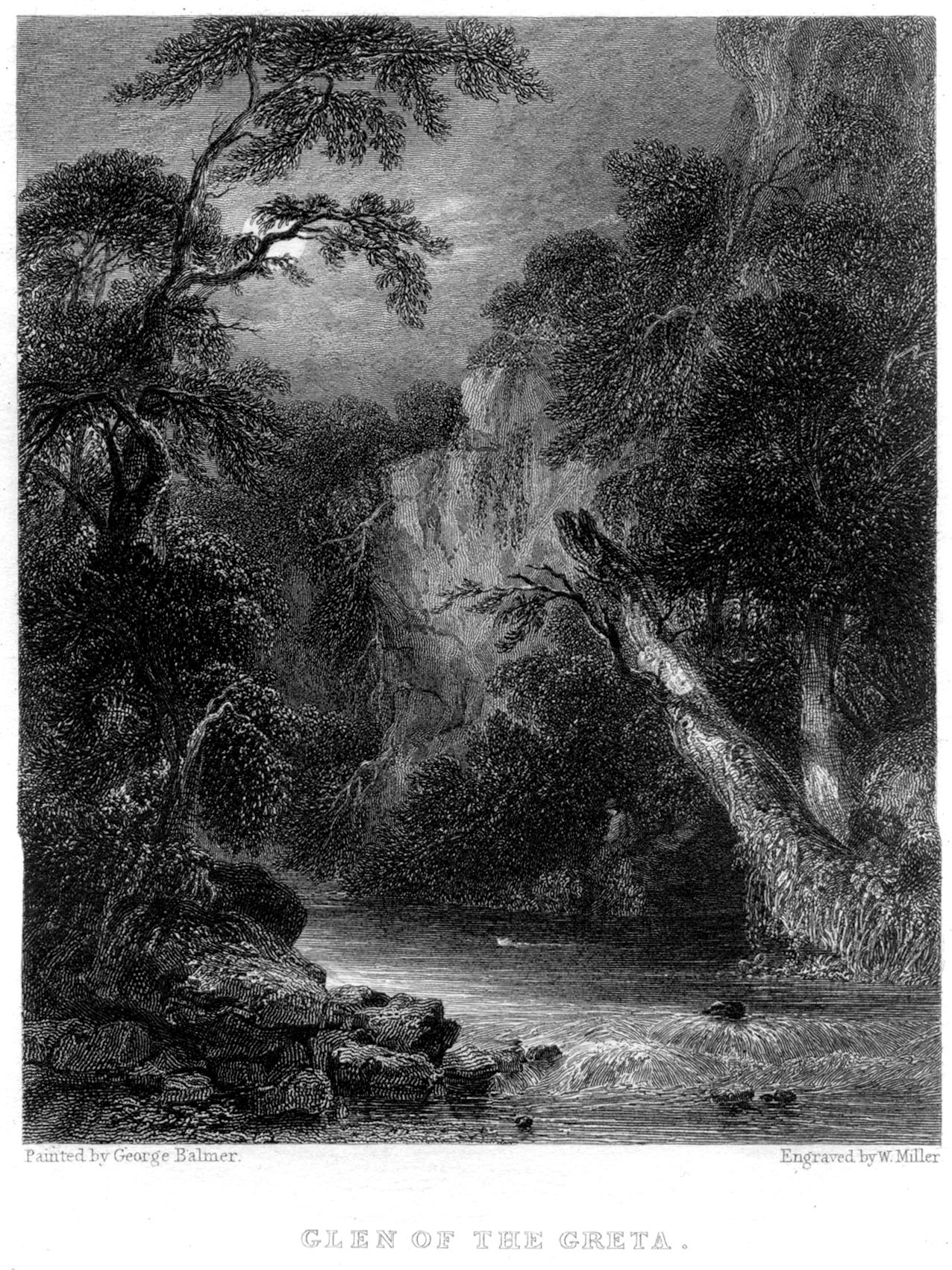
Glen of the Greta (engraving by William Miller after George Balmer, 1834)

George Balmer (c. 1806 – 10 April 1846) was an English landscape and marine painter and illustrator.

== Life and work ==
Balmer was born in North Shields, Northumberland, the son of a house painter. He initially followed his father's trade, but eventually took up art, coming under the influence of the work of John Wilson Ewbank (c.1779-1847). His earliest works were exhibited in Newcastle and attracted attention; he followed up this initial success with a large picture called A View of the Port of Tyne. In 1831 he exhibited some watercolours, again in Newcastle, of which one, The Juicy Tree Bit, was thought the best in the rooms. In collaboration with John Wilson Carmichael he painted The Heroic Exploit of Admiral Collingwood at Trafalgar.

In 1832 or 1833 he made a tour of the continent, travelling by way of Holland to the Rhine and Switzerland, and returning by way of Paris where he stayed for several months, copying from the works of the masters in The Louvre. Returning to England, he settled in London, exhibiting pictures of the Rhine, coast scenes, and moonlight views – a large View of Bingen and one of Haarlem Mere, being amongst the best.

In 1836, in the employ of William Finden, Balmer began a publication called The Ports and Harbours of England. Although he produced many drawings for the book, it was never realised to the full extent that he had originally envisaged. He retired from London in 1842, and gave up painting. He died near Ravensworth, in Durham on 10 April 1846.
