= Sarah Holland =

British writer, actress and singer (born 1961)

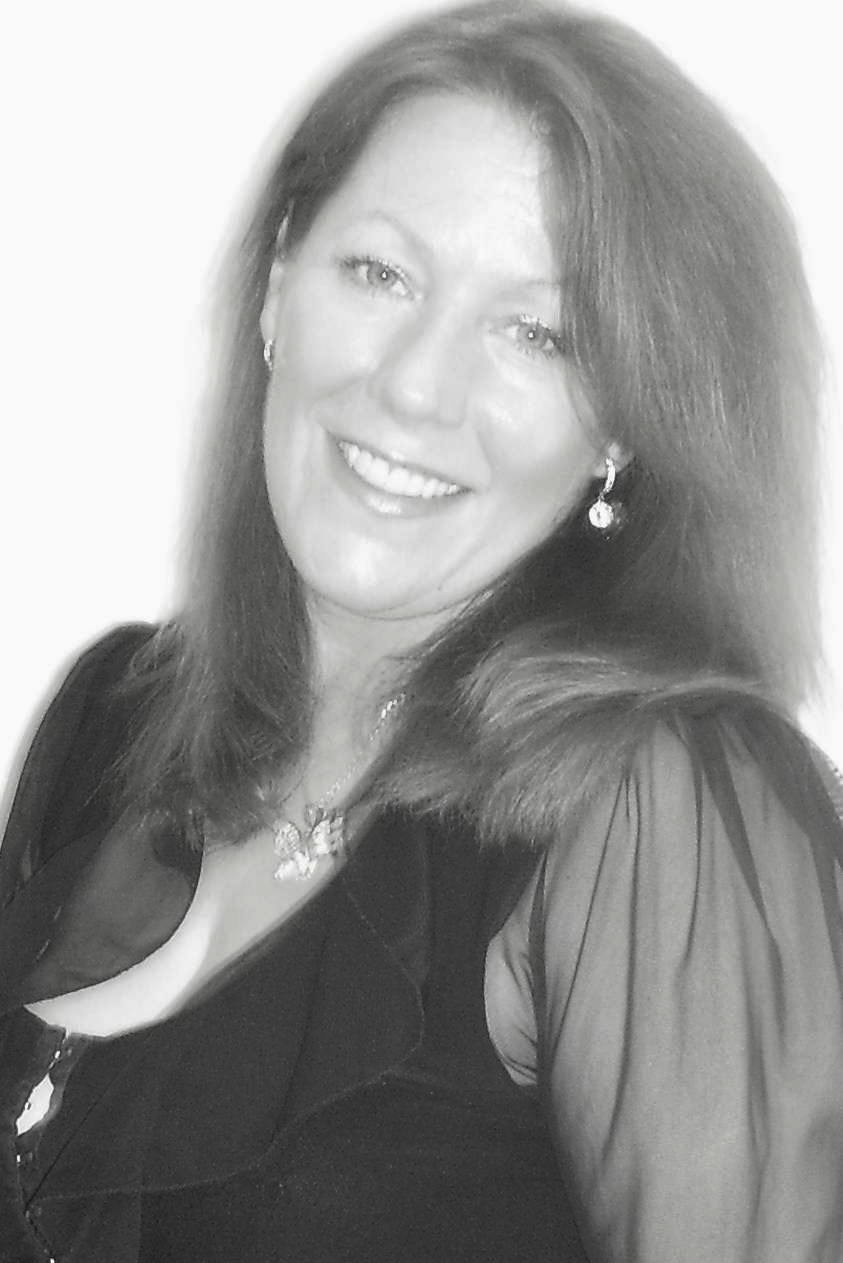
- Born: November 1961 (age 64); Folkestone, Kent, England
- Occupations: Writer; actress; singer
- Relatives: Sheila Holland (mother), Richard Holland (father); Jane Holland (sister)
- Writing career
- Pen name: Abby Rhode
- Period: 1982–present

Sarah Holland (born November 1961) is a British writer, actress and singer best known for her 22 romantic novels for Harlequin. She has also written for television, newspapers and the screen as well as appearing in films; most notably the Texan movie Artois the Goat (2009) and a supporting role with Jack Palance in Treasure Island (1999). Holland wrote her first book, Too Hot To Handle at 18, and became one of the youngest romantic novelists in history when it was published in 1982.

== Biography ==
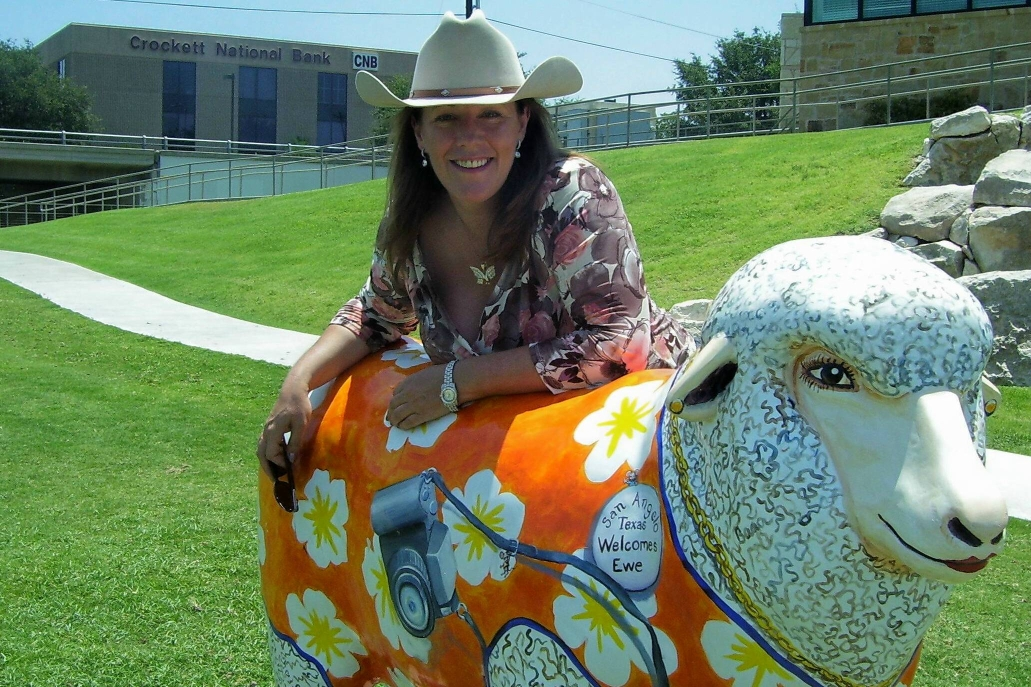
Holland in San Angelo, Texas, with a sheep

Holland was born in November 1961 at Folkestone, Kent, England. The daughter of Sheila Coates Holland (novelist Charlotte Lamb) and journalist Richard Holland, she has four siblings, including poet and novelist Jane Holland.

Holland suffered epilepsy in her teens and had to leave Wanstead High School, London with a handful of O levels at sixteen. Subsequently, educated at home by her parents, she moved to the Isle of Man with them in 1978 and, in 1980, began training to write at her mother's side.

Holland lives in Scotland and works in Edinburgh.

== Writing career ==
Because of the speed of her writing and the success of her books, Holland was nicknamed Mouton Cadet, a wordplay on Lamb's Daughter, by publishing brothers Alan Boon and John Boon, who then ran Mills & Boon. This industry nickname was later reported in the non-fiction book The Merchants of Venus: Inside Harlequin and the Empire of Romance by Paul Grescoe (1998). Holland was living in San Angelo, Texas in April 2008 when the FLDS Mormon-splinter sect case shot to international prominence and, as a contributing journalist, wrote about it for the San Angelo Standard-Times sparking a news debate as well as giving interviews to Texan news agencies including San Angelo Live. In late 2008, Holland moved to London, England, where she worked as publication director for EMP Media's national celebrity magazine empire At Home Magazine for three years. In June 2011, she was appointed editor-in-chief of Victory House Publishing's La Creme Magazine.

== Acting career ==
At 20, Holland enrolled at the London East 15 Acting School and embarked on an acting career which has included film, television and theatre. She performed Shakespeare for BBC 2's Bard on the Box series (1994) and won the supporting actress role opposite Hollywood superstar Jack Palance in Treasure Island directed by Peter Rowe; also starring Patrick Bergin and Kevin Zegers. Her Equity registered stage name is Abigail Rhode (Abby Rhode). She has appeared in a number of films through the Isle of Man Film Commission. In 2008, Holland played French author Eva Verrane in the award-winning film Artois The Goat, which she also narrated; it was directed by Cliff and Kyle Bogart and shot in Austin, Texas for the 2009 Sundance Film Festival with the world premiere at the SXSW Film Festival 2009 at Austin, Texas. Artois the Goat gained a string of nominations and awards at international film festivals in 2009–10. Holland appeared as Audrey in the Summer 2013 production of Shakespeare's As You Like It in Hampstead, London and is appearing in the autumn 2013 season of Chekhov plays including The Bear, The Proposal and The Cherry Orchard. Sarah has also written theatre reviews, most recently for the opening week of Stephen Ward the Musical, music by Andrew Lloyd Webber, lyrics by Don Black and Christopher Hampton.

== Works ==
=== Single novels ===
- Too Hot To Handle (1982)
- Tomorrow Began Yesterday (1982)
- The Devil's Mistress (1982)
- Deadly Angel (1982)
- Fever Pitch (1983)
- Bluebeard's Bride (1985)
- Outcast Lovers (1985)
- The Heat Is On (1988)
- Adult Love (1990)
- Desert Destiny (1991)
- Forbidden Passion (1991)
- Last of the Great French Lovers (1992)
- Ruthless Lover (1992)
- Confrontation (1992)
- Extreme Provocation (1993)
- Ungoverned Passion (1993)
- Dangerous Desire (1994
- Blue Fire (1994)
- Master of Seduction (1995)
- An Obsessive Love (1995)
- The Dominant Male (1996)
- Red Hot Lover (1998)
