= John Wilson Carmichael =

English painter (1799–1868)

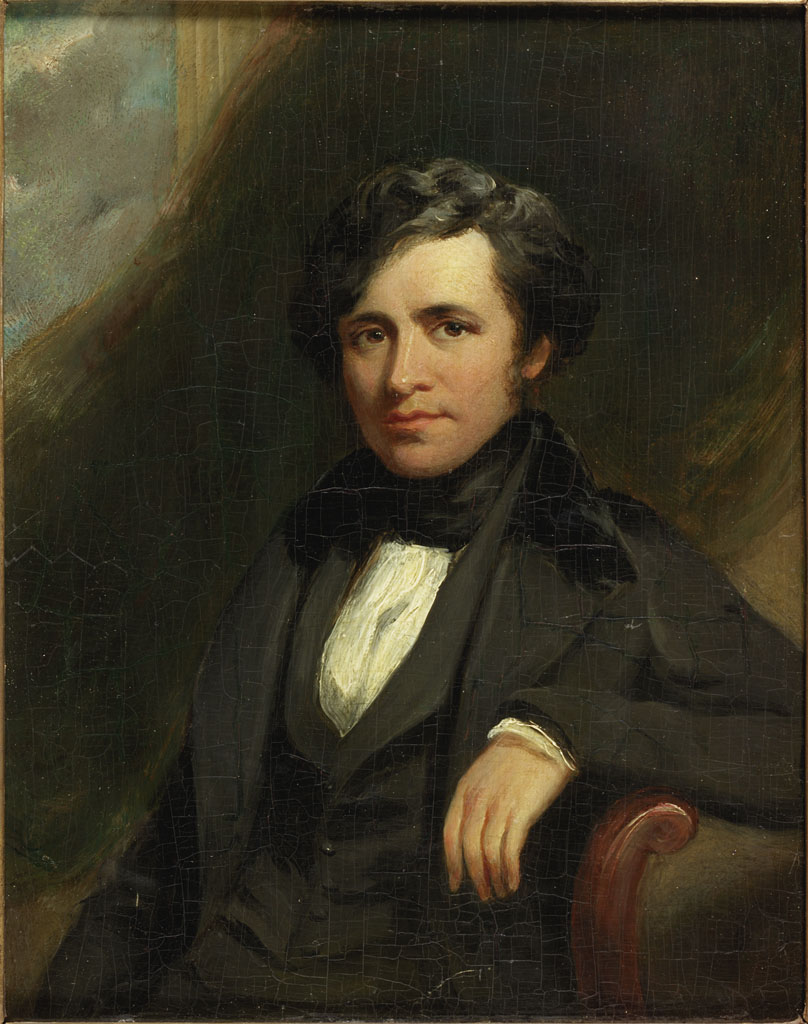
- 1839 portrait of Carmichael by Thomas Ellerby
- Born: 9 June 1799; Newcastle upon Tyne
- Died: 2 May 1868 (aged 68); Scarborough
- Known for: Maritime art; Landscape painting
- Spouse: Mary Sweet
- Family: Herbert Gustave Schmalz (grandson); Henry Seton Merriman (grandson)

John Wilson Carmichael (9 June 1799 – 2 May 1868) was an English painter who specialised in marine art and landscape painting. Based in Newcastle upon Tyne and later in London, he was a household name in his lifetime, and his work remains some of the most desirable in the marine art market. He was described by art historian Jeremy Maas as "a sea painter of great, though sometimes uneven, natural talent".

== Life ==
Carmichael was born in the Ouseburn area of Newcastle upon Tyne, Northumberland, on 9 June 1799, the first son of Mary (née Johnson) and William Carmichael, a shipwright. Only vague details of his early life are known, but according to Mackenzie's History of Newcastle (1827), he went to sea at a young age, and spent three years on a transport sailing between ports in Spain and Portugal. After returning home, he was apprenticed in his father's trade to a local shipbuilding firm. Upon completion of his apprenticeship, he devoted all his spare time to art, and eventually gave up the carpentry business, setting himself up as a drawing-master and miniature painter. His first historical painting to attract public notice was the Fight Between the Shannon and Chesapeake, which sold for 13 guineas (£13.65). He then painted The Bombardment of Algiers for Trinity House, Newcastle, for which he received 40 guineas; it is still at Trinity House, along with The Heroic Exploits of Admiral Lord Collingwood in HMS "Excellent" at the Battle of Cape St. Vincent, painted in collaboration with George Balmer. Another important early commission was for a View of Newcastle for which the city corporation paid him 100 guineas. By 1831, when Carmichael was living in Blackett Street, Newcastle, he had 18 works included in the annual exhibition of the Northern Academy of Arts, 14 of which were landscapes. During the redevelopment of the centre of Newcastle, Carmichael worked with the architect John Dobson to produce some joint works, including paintings with designs for the Central station and Grainger Market. He also collaborated with John Blackmore to produce the illustrated book: Views on the Newcastle and Carlisle Railway (1836).

When he moved to London in 1846, he had already established a reputation as a skilled maritime artist. In 1855, during the Crimean War he was sent to the Baltic (Note: The diary Carmichael kept during this trip was acquired by the National Museum of the Royal Navy, Portsmouth in 2008.) to make drawings for the Illustrated London News. His painting of the bombardment of Sveaborg, which he witnessed during this assignment, was exhibited at the Royal Academy and is now in the collection of the National Maritime Museum. Between 1835 and 1862, he had a total of 21 paintings shown at the Royal Academy, and the same number at the British Institution, whilst 6 were exhibited by the Society of British Artists, and 8 elsewhere in London. The Times reported that two of Carmichael's works, Captain Cook (Note: See James Cook.) in the Tropical Regions and Captain Parry (Note: See William Edward Parry.) in the Polar Regions, (Note: In a notice published in the Observer, these were described as "good geographical pictures".) attratcted the attention of Queen Victoria when she visited an exhibition in Westminster Hall on 25 June 1847. William Bell Scott, who knew the artist well, noted that he earned "a good deal of money" from the sale of smaller paintings, which were in high demand.

In 1863, Carmichael and his wife moved to Scarborough, where he continued to paint into the last year of his life despite not being in good health. He died on 2 May 1868, probably of a stroke. In an obituary published in the Art Journal, he was described as "[g]ifted with an eye of rare accuracy and a hand ready in the delineation of form".

During the second half of the nineteenth century a number of manuals on marine painting were published, including two which Winsor & Newton commissioned from Carmichael: The Art of Marine Painting in Water-Colours (1859) and The Art of Marine Painting in Oil-Colours (1864). He taught Canadian marine artist John O'Brien, who spent nine months in London after arriving in 1857.

Carmichael married Mary Sweet on 20 March 1826. His eldest son, John William, died in 1862 at the age of 32. His eldest daughter Margaret was the mother of artist Herbert Gustave Schmalz, who adopted his grandfather's surname in 1918. His daughter Mary Sweet was the mother of novelist Henry Seton Merriman. His daughter Annie married William Luson Thomas son of a shipbroker and a successful artist who, exasperated by the treatment of artists by the Illustrated London News, founded in 1869 The Graphic newspaper which had immense influence within the art world.

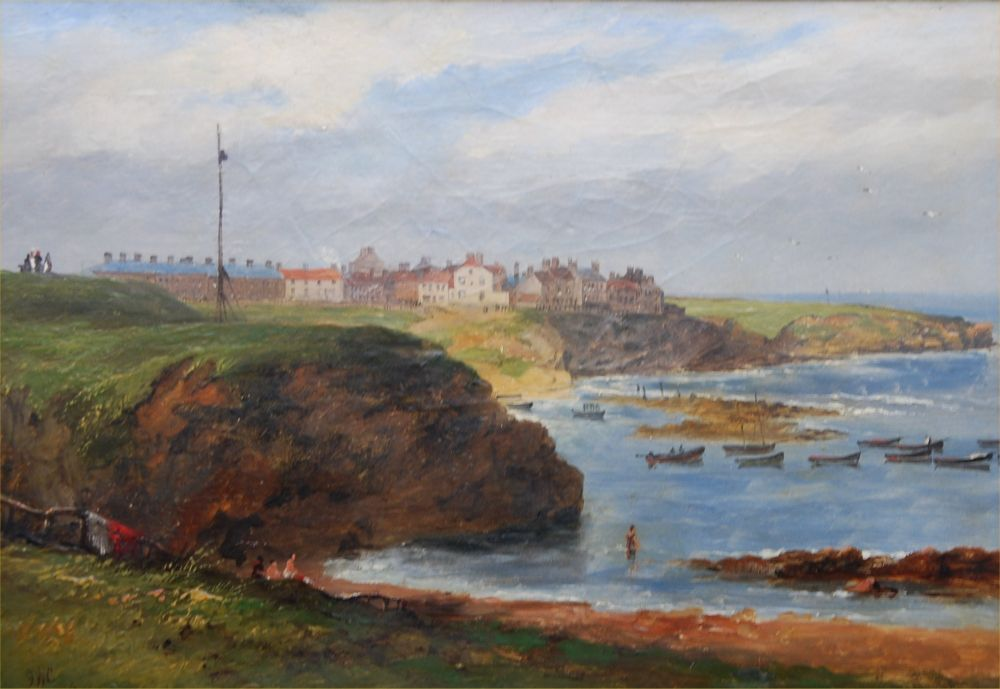
Cullercoats from the South, 1845, private collection

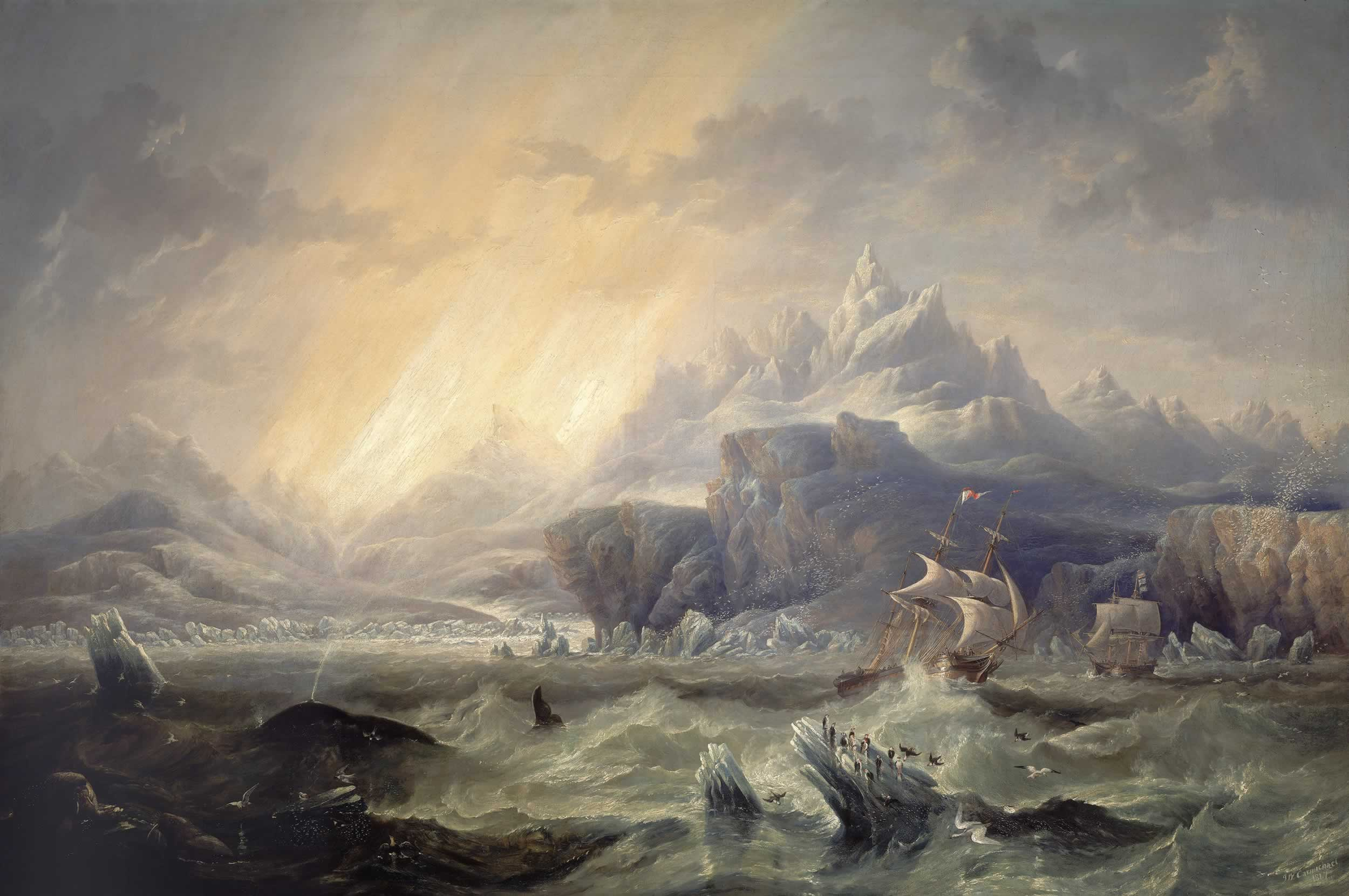
HMS Erebus and Terror in the Antarctic, 1847, now at the National Maritime Museum

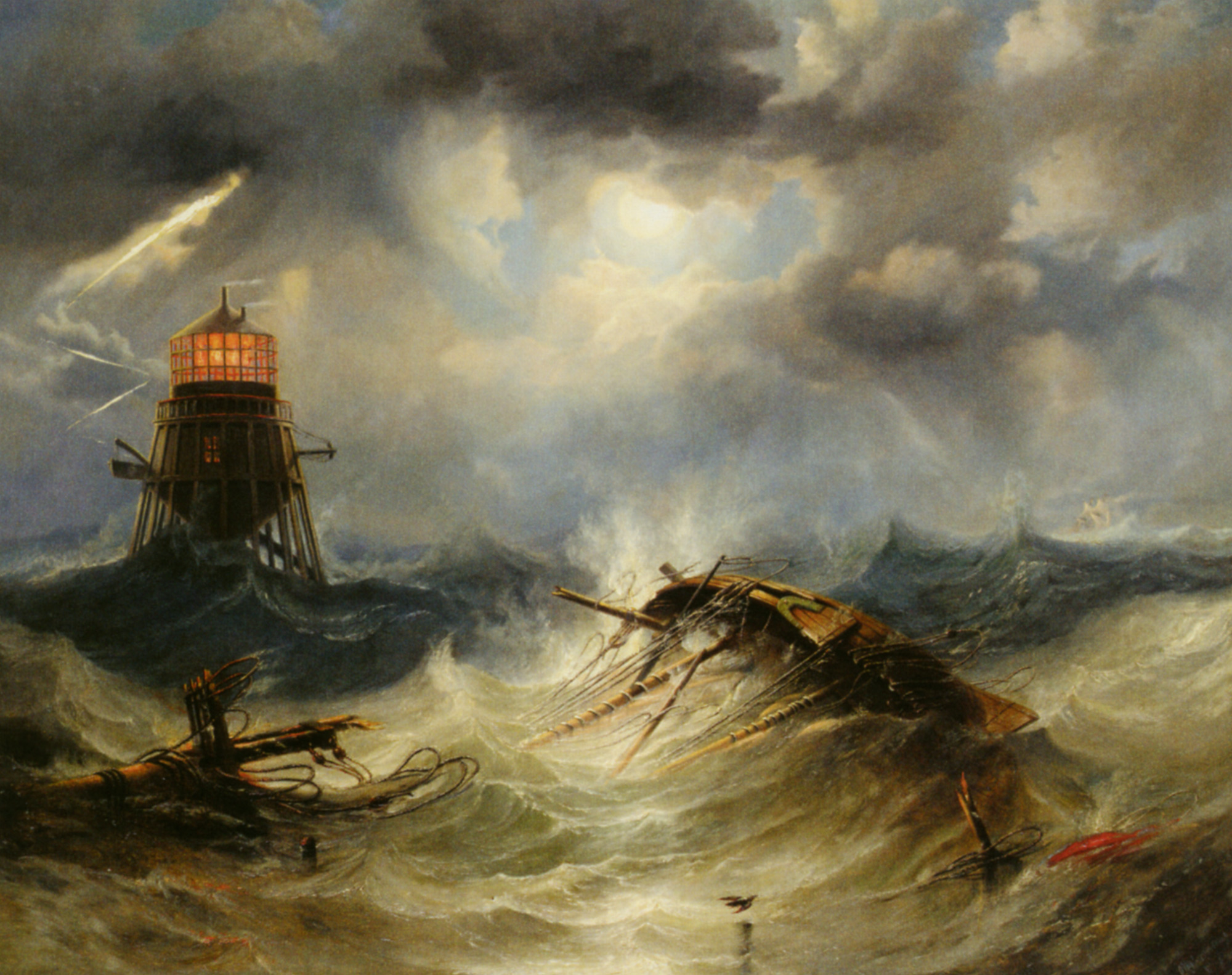
The Irwin Lighthouse, Storm Raging, 1851, private collection

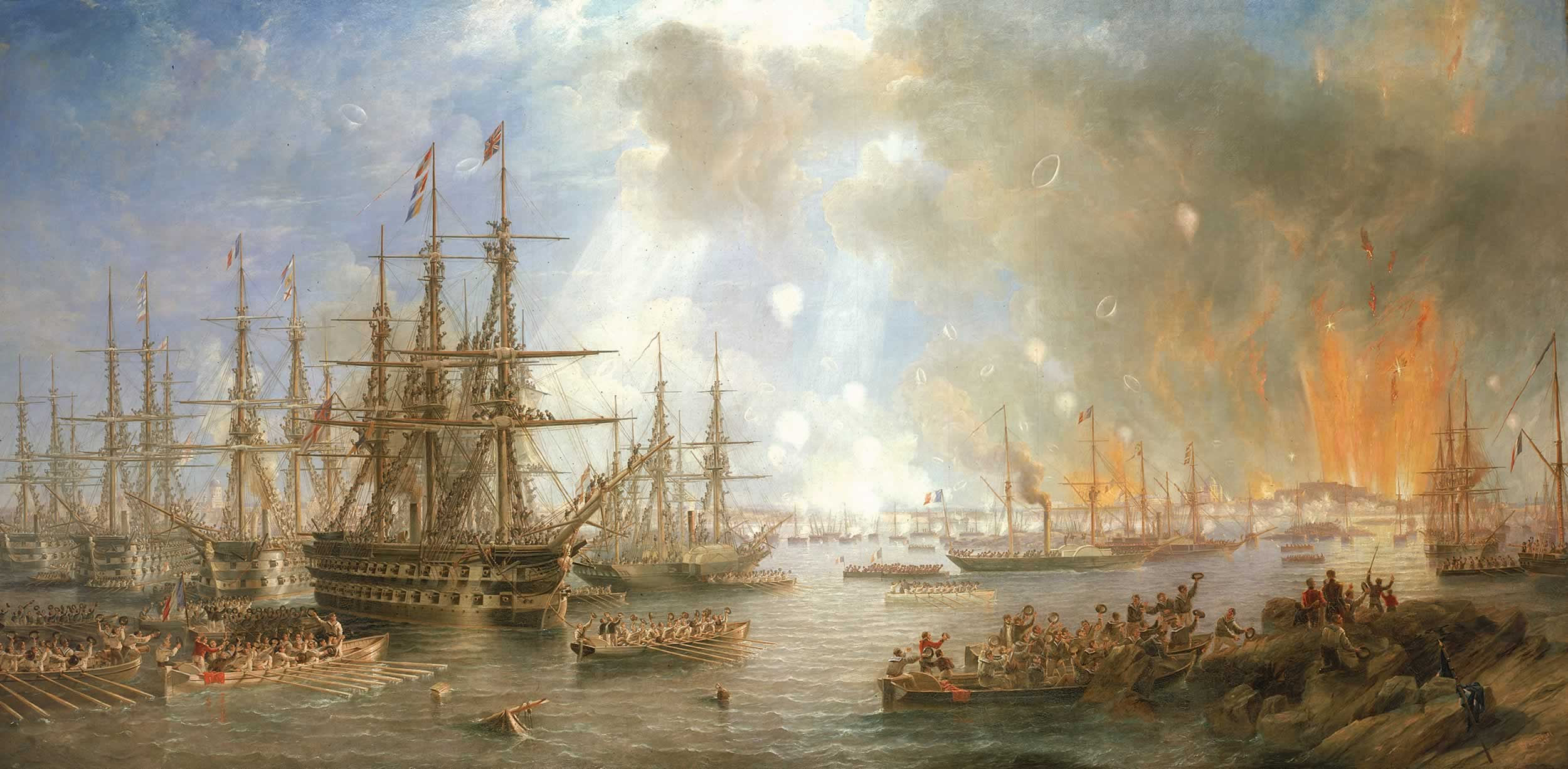
The Bombardment of Sveaborg, 9 August 1855, 1855, now at the National Maritime Museum

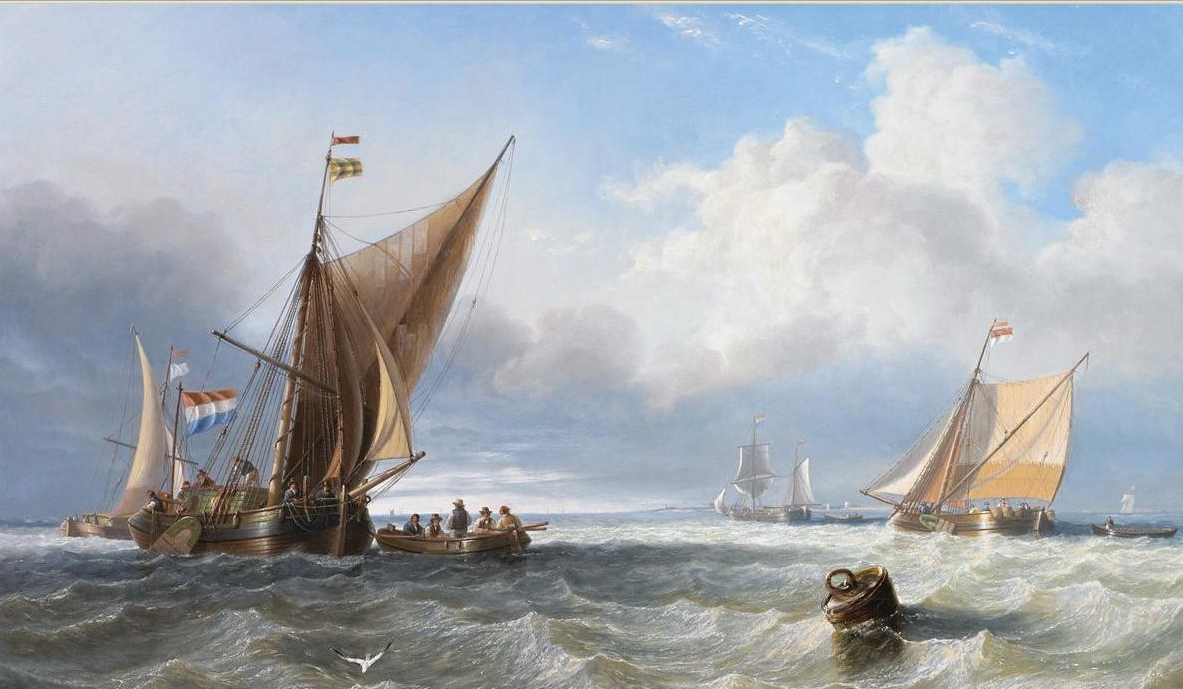
Off the Dutch Coast, 1858, now at the Willow Gallery, London

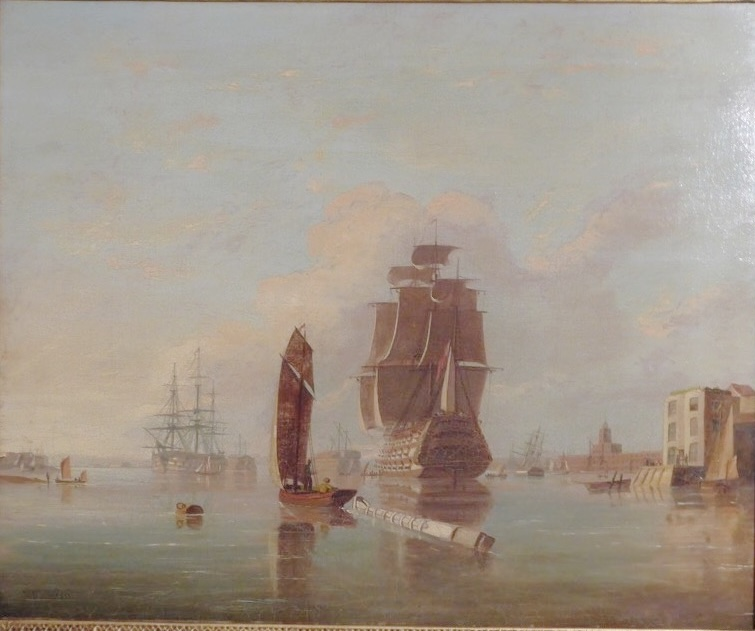
Portsmouth Harbour, c1835, private collection
