= Jane Holland =

English poet, novelist and astrologer

- Born: 17 November 1966 (age 60); Ilford, London, England
- Occupation: Novelist
- Relatives: Sheila Holland (mother), Richard Holland (father), Sarah Holland (sister)
- Writing career
- Pen name: Jane Holland, Victoria Lamb, Elizabeth Moss, Beth Good, Hannah Coates, Betty Walker
- Period: 1989–present

Jane Holland (born 17 November 1966) is an English poet and novelist. She won an Eric Gregory Award from the Society of Authors for her poetry in 1996 and her young adult novel Witchstruck, written as Victoria Lamb, won the Romantic Novelists' Association's Young Adult Romantic Novel of the Year Award for 2013. Her sister is the novelist and actress Sarah Holland. She also writes commercial fiction under various pseudonyms, including Betty Walker, JJ Holland, Victoria Lamb, Elizabeth Moss, Beth Good and Hannah Coates.

== Biography ==
Holland was born on 17 November 1966 in Ilford, London, England, the daughter of the romantic novelist Sheila Ann Mary Coates Holland (Charlotte Lamb) and classical biographer and former Times journalist Richard Holland. She moved with her parents to the Isle of Man in 1977, where she lived for 23 years. She has four siblings: the novelist, actress and singer Sarah Holland, Charlotte, Michael and David. She was a snooker player on the WLBSA Women's World Snooker circuit for six years from 1989 to 1995, under her married name Jane Moss and later Jane Holland, and was seeded 24 in the 1994 Women's World Snooker Championship.

After leaving snooker, Holland edited the small poetry magazine Blade from 1995 to 1999, and published her first full-length collection of poetry in 1997, The Brief History of a Disreputable Woman, with Bloodaxe Books, followed in 1999 by a first novel, Kissing the Pink, with Sceptre, both these works being inspired by the fall-out following her departure from snooker. She was also one of five young Bloodaxe poets who performed on the New Blood UK Tour of 1997, the others being Roddy Lumsden, Julia Copus, Tracey Herd and Eleanor Brown.

Holland was the Warwick Poet Laureate for 2008. She founded the Poets On Fire website and forum, and was a prominent member of the Birmingham-based performance poetry and spoken-word group New October Poets in 2006, when she was named one of the top poetry performers in the West Midlands under the "Six of the Best" scheme. She edited the online arts magazine Horizon Review (Salt Publishing) from 2008 to 2010 and was a commissioning editor at Embrace Books from 2010 to 2011.

Holland's first collection was in a mainstream British tradition, generally as a "nature" poet rather than an urban stylist, citing Ted Hughes as a major early influence. Recent work includes a long narrative poem sequence written in the voice of Boudicca and a translation of the Anglo-Saxon poem, "The Wanderer".

Boudicca & Co. was published by Salt Publishing in 2006. Camper Van Blues was published by Salt in 2008. Two poetry pamphlets were also published in 2008: The Lament of the Wanderer [Heaventree Press], a new translation of the eponymous Anglo-Saxon poem, and On Warwick (Nine Arches Press), a collection of poems written during her year as Warwick Poet Laureate, including the long experimental poem On Warwick Castle.

Now a full-time fiction writer, she has written numerous bestselling thrillers as Jane Holland, including her most popular novel to date, Girl Number One [Thomas & Mercer], which was a UK Kindle #1 Bestseller in December 2015, as well as a string of romances, historicals and contemporary novels variously under the pseudonyms Betty Walker, JJ Holland, Beth Good, Victoria Lamb, Elizabeth Moss, and others.

== Works ==
=== Poetry ===
As Jane Holland
- The Brief History of a Disreputable Woman (1997)
- Boudicca & Co. (2006)
- Camper Van Blues (2008)
- The Lament of the Wanderer (2008)
- On Warwick (2008)
- Flash Bang: New & Selected Poems (2014)

=== Fiction ===
As Jane Holland
- Kissing the Pink (1999; Revised Digital Edition 2016)
- Girl Number One (2015)
- Last Bird Singing (2015)
- Miranda (2015)
- Lock The Door (2017)
- All Your Secrets (2017)
- Forget Her Name (2018)
- Dead Sis (2019)
- The Hive (2019)
- Under An Evil Star (2020)
- The Tenth House Murders (2020)
- The Part of Death (2020)
- Keep Me Close (2021)
- The Manor House (2022)
- The Silver Ring (2023)
- The Court of the Labyrinth (2023)
- The Carer (2024)
- Murder By Mercury (2025)
- The Spiritualist's Daughter (2025)
- In High Places (2025 Revised Edition)
- Secrets of Sycamore Hall (2026)

As Victoria Lamb

- The Queen's Secret (2012)
- Witchstruck (2012)
- His Dark Lady (2013)
- Witchfall (2013)
- Her Last Assassin (2014)
- Silk For Susannah (2014)
- Witchrise (2014)
- The Spellworker (2020)
- The Sea Rider (2021)

As Elizabeth Moss

- The Earl and His Tiger (2011)
- The Uncatchable Miss Faversham (2011)
- A Most Dangerous Lady (2011)
- A Most Dangerous Lord (2012)
- Wolf Bride (2013)
- Rebel Bride (2014)
- Rose Bride (2014)
- Regency House (2014)
- Don't Hurt Me (2015)
- Lavinia In Love (2015)
- The Earl's Secret Passion (2017)

As Beth Good

- The Oddest Little Chocolate Shop (2014)
- The Oddest Little Christmas Shop (2014)
- The Oddest Little Beach Shop (2015)
- The Oddest Little Christmas Cake Shop (2015)
- The Oddest Little Romance Shop (2015)
- The Oddest Little Book Shop (2016)
- The Colouring Book Club (2016)
- The Oddest Little Gingerbread Shop (2016)
- The Oddest Little Cornish Tea Shop (2017)
- The Oddest Little Mistletoe Shop (2017)
- Winter Without You (2018)
- All Summer With You (2019)
- A Very Cornish Christmas (2020)
- The Oddest Little Cornish Christmas Shop (2022)
- The Oddest Little Flower Shop (2023)
- Purely Yours (2024)
- The Paris Trip (2024)
- The Oddest Little Cornish Christmas Tree Shop (2024)

As Hannah Coates

- Bertie's Gift (2016)

As JJ Holland

- In High Places (2019)

As Betty Walker

- Wartime With The Cornish Girls (2021)
- Christmas With The Cornish Girls (2021)
- Courage For The Cornish Girls (2022)
- A Mother's Hope For The Cornish Girls (2023)
- A Wedding For The Cornish Girls (2023)
- Victory For The Cornish Girls (2024)
- A New Hope For The Cornish Girls (2024)
- Brighter Days For The Cornish Girls (2025)
- The Cornish Girls Before The Storm (2026)

As Pippa Summers/Beth Good

- Summer at Wishing Well Cottage (2018)
- Sunshine at Wishing Well Cottage (2018)
- Red Roses at Wishing Well Cottage (2019)
- Butterflies at Wishing Well Cottage (2019)
- Christmas at Wishing Well Cottage (2019)
- Sunrise at Wishing Well Cottage (2020)
- Tinsel & Starlight at Wishing Well Cottage (2020)
