= Charlotte Lamb =

British novelist (1937–2000)

- Born: Sheila Ann Mary Coates; 22 December 1937; Dagenham, Essex, England
- Died: 8 October 2000 (aged 62); Isle of Man
- Occupation: Novelist
- Spouse: Richard Holland (m. 1959)
- Children: 5, including Sarah and Jane
- Writing career
- Pen name: Sheila Holland; Sheila Coates; Sheila Lancaster; Victoria Woolf; Laura Hardy
- Period: 1972–2000
- Genres: Romance, historical, romantic thriller
- Website: www.charlottelamb.blogspot.com

Sheila Ann Mary Coates Holland (née Coates; 22 December 1937 – 8 October 2000), best known by her pen name Charlotte Lamb, was a British novelist. She signed her novels with her married and maiden names (Sheila Holland, Sheila Coates) and under the pen names Sheila Lancaster, Victoria Woolf and Laura Hardy. She was the mother of writers Sarah Holland and Jane Holland.

== Biography ==
=== Personal life ===
She was born Sheila Ann Mary Coates on 22 December 1937, at Dagenham, Essex, England. As a child, she was moved from relative to relative to escape the bombings of World War II. She attended the Ursuline Academy Ilford, then the Ilford Ursuline High School for Girls in Ilford, Essex.

She worked as a typist-secretary at the Bank of England in London, from 1954 to 1956, and then as a junior researcher for the BBC at Broadcasting House from the 1956 to 1958.

In 1959, she married Richard Holland, then a Fleet Street journalist, later a sub-editor of The Times and a classical biographer. They had five children, including a set of twins: Michael Holland, Sarah Holland, Jane Holland, Charlotte Holland and David Holland. Her husband prompted her to begin writing in the early 1970s.

She died suddenly on 8 October 2000 in her baronial-style home 'Crogga' on the Isle of Man. She had been living on the island since 1977 with her husband and four of her five children.

=== Writing career ===
She began her writing career as her married name Sheila Holland and as her maiden name Sheila Coates. In 1973 she signed Follow a Stranger as her most famous pseudonym: Charlotte Lamb, but later she used several other pseudonyms, among them Sheila Lancaster, Victoria Woolf and Laura Hardy.

Her first historical and romantic novels were published by Robert Hale and serialised in Woman's Weekly Digest. By the late 1970s, she was an established and successful author, publishing as many as twelve novels a year with Mills and Boon. That annual number rose over the next few years; by the late 1990s, she had published over 160 novels, most of them romances, others historical novels and romantic thrillers, achieving over 200 million sales worldwide. During the course of her career, she wrote for a variety of different international publishers including: Penguin, Collins, Fontana, Hodder & Stoughton, Hodder Headline and Simon & Schuster.

Her last novel, a romantic thriller published posthumously with Hodder & Stoughton, was entitled The Angel of Death.

== Bibliography ==
=== As Sheila Holland ===
- Prisoner of the Heart (1972)
- Love in a Mist (1972)
- Lantern in the Night (1973)
- Falcon on the Hill (1974)
- Growing Season (1975)
- Shadows at Dawn (1975)
- Caring Kind (1976)
- Gold of Apollo (1976)
- Devil and Miss Hay (1977)
- Eleanor of Aquitaine (1978)
- Love's Bright Flame (1978)
- Maiden Castle (1978)
- Dancing Hill (1978)
- Folly by Candlelight (1978)
- The Masque (1979)
- Secrets to Keep (1980)
- Burning Memories (1981)
- Playing With Fire (1981)
- The Notorious Gentleman (1980)
- Miss Charlotte's Fancy (1980)
- Dream Master (1982)
- Tears and Red Roses (1982)
- Dark Fantasy (1982)
- Secrets (1983)
- Men Are Dangerous (1984)
- Secrets (1984)
- A Woman of Iron (1985)

=== As Sheila Coates ===
- A Crown Usurped (1972)
- Queen's Letter (1973)
- Flight of the Swan (1973)
- Bells of the City (1975)

=== As Charlotte Lamb ===
==== Single novels ====
- Follow a Stranger (1973)
- Carnival Coast (1973)
- A Family Affair (1974)
- Sweet Sanctuary (1976)
- Star-crossed (1976)
- Festival Summer (1977)
- Florentine Spring (1977)
- Heron Quest (1977)
- Kingfisher Morning (1977)
- Hawk in a Blue Sky (1977)
- Cruel Flame (1978)
- Desert Barbarian (1978)
- Devil's Arms (1978)
- Master of Comus (1978)
- Call Back Yesterday (1978)
- Beware of the Stranger (1978)
- Disturbing Stranger (1978)
- Autumn Conquest (1978)
- The Long Surrender (1978)
- Duel of Desire (1978)
- Pagan Encounter (1978)
- Dark Master (1979)
- Fever (1979)
- Forbidden Fire (1979)
- Sensation (1979)
- Twist of Fate (1979)
- Silken Trap (1979)
- Temptation (1979)
- Dark Dominion (1979)
- Love is a Frenzy (1979)
- Frustration (1979)
- Compulsion (1980)
- Frozen Fire (1980)
- Man's World (1980)
- Night Music (1980)
- Obsession (1980)
- Savage Surrender (1980)
- Storm Centre (1980)
- Crescendo (1980)
- Stranger in the Night (1980)
- Seduction (1980)
- Abduction (1981)
- Dangerous (1981)
- Desire (1981)
- Girl from Nowhere (1981)
- Heartbreaker (1981)
- Illusion (1981)
- Retribution (1981)
- Wild Affair (1982)
- Midnight Lover (1982)
- Darkness of the Heart (1983)
- The Sex War (1983)
- Betrayal (1983)
- A Violation (1983)
- Haunted (1983)
- Infatuation (1984)
- Naked Flame (1984)
- Scandalous (1984)
- For Adults Only (1984)
- Love Games (1985)
- Man Hunt (1985)
- Who's Been Sleeping in My Bed? (1985)
- Sleeping Desire (1985)
- Bride Said No (1985)
- Explosive Meeting (1985)
- Heat of the Night (1986)
- Love in the Dark (1986)
- Circle of Fate (1987)
- Whirlwind (1987)
- Hide and Seek (1987)
- Kiss of Fire (1987)
- Echo of Passion (1987)
- Out of Control (1987)
- No More Lonely Nights (1988)
- You Can Love a Stranger (1988)
- Desperation (1988)
- Seductive Stranger (1989)
- Runaway Wife (1989)
- Rites of Possession (1990)
- Dark Pursuit (1990)
- Spellbinding (1990)
- Dark Music (1990)
- The Threat of Love (1990)
- Heart on Fire (1991)
- Shotgun Wedding (1991)
- Sleeping Partners (1991)
- Forbidden Fruit (1991)
- Dreaming (1993)
- Fire in the Blood (1993)
- Falling in Love (1993)
- Wounds of Passion (1993)
- Guilty Love (1994)
- Body and Soul (1994)
- Vampire Lover (1994)
- Dying for You (1994)
- In the Still of the Night (1995)
- Walking in Darkness (1996)
- Lovestruck (1997)
- The Marriage War (1997)
- Deep and Silent Waters (1998)
- The Yuletide Child (1998)
- Treasons of the Heart (1999)
- Hot Surrender (1999)
- The Seduction Business (1999)
- Dormant: Shadow of Angels (2000)
- Angel of Death (2000)
- The Boss's Virgin (2001)

==== Enemies & Lovers series ====
1. Possession (1979)
2. A Secret Intimacy (1983)

==== Barbary Wharf series ====
1. Besieged (1992)
2. Battle for Possession (1992)
3. Too Close for Comfort (1992)
4. Playing Hard to Get (1992)
5. A Sweet Addiction (1992)
6. Surrender (1992)

==== Sins series ====
1. Secret Obsession (1995)
2. Deadly Rivals (1995)
3. Haunted Dreams (1995)
4. Wild Hunger (1995)
5. Dark Fever (1995)
6. Angry Desire (1995)
7. Hot Blood (1996)

==== Pages & Privileges series (multi-author) ====
- Dark Fate (1994)

==== Man Talk series (multi-author) ====
- An Excellent Wife? (1998)

==== Collections ====
- Duet: Spellbinding / Dark Music (1993)
- Best of Charlotte Lamb: Call Back Yesterday / Autumn Conquest (1984)
- Best of Charlotte Lamb: Devil's Arms / Love is a Frenzy (1984)
- Best of Charlotte Lamb: Compulsion / Seduction (1985)
- The Charlotte Lamb Collection: Love in the Dark / Circle of Fate (1991)
- Charlotte Lamb a Collection-Sept 93: Sex War / Desperation / Out of Control (1993)
- Charlotte Lamb: a Collection (1995)
- Duet: Call Back Yesterday / Circle of Fate (2003)
- Duet: Wild Affair / Scandalous (2004)
- Duet: Stranger in the Night / Runaway Wife (2005)

==== Omnibus in collaboration ====
- Dolphin Bay by Gloria Bevan / Festival Summer by Charlotte Lamb / Safari South by Kay Thorpe (1981)
- Romance Treasury: Web of Silver by Elizabeth Hunter / The voice in the Thunder by Charlotte Lamb / Carnival Coast by Lucy Gillen (1982)
- Romance Treasury: This Wish I Have by Amanda Doyle / Sister to Meryl by Nerina Hilliard / Desert Barbarian by Charlotte Lamb (1986)
- Nine Months: Forbidden Fruit / Simply Irresistible (1996) (Charlotte Lamb with Miranda Lee)
- Snowbound (1997) (Shotgun Wedding by Charlotte Lamb / Murder by the Book by Margaret St. George / On a Wing and a Prayer by Jackie Weger
- Captive Hearts (1998) (with Lynne Graham with Charlotte Lamb and Robyn Donald)
- Boardroom to Bedroom (2001) (with Emma Darcy and Catherine George)
- Bewitched by the Boss (2006) (Charlotte Lamb with Alison Fraser and Leigh Michaels)

==== Graphic novels ====
- Idol Dreams (2006) art by Yoko Hanabusa, the original story A Wild Affair
- Heart on Fire (2007) art by Yohna

=== As Sheila Lancaster ===
==== Single novels ====
- Dark Sweet Wanton (1979)
- The Tilthammer (1980)
- Mistress of Fortune (1982)

=== As Victoria Woolf ===
==== Single novels ====
- Sweet Compulsion (1979)

==== Omnibus in collaboration ====
- Romance Treasury: Heart of the Scorpion by Janice Gray / The Winds of Heaven by Margaret Way / Sweet Compulsion by Victoria Woolf (1987)

=== As Laura Hardy ===
(same titles as Sheila Holland)

==== Single novels ====
- Burning Memories (1981)
- Playing With Fire (1981)
- Dream Master (1982)
- Tears and Red Roses (1982)
- Dark Fantasy (1983)
- MenAre Dangerous (1984)
