= Thomas Ellerby =

English portrait artist

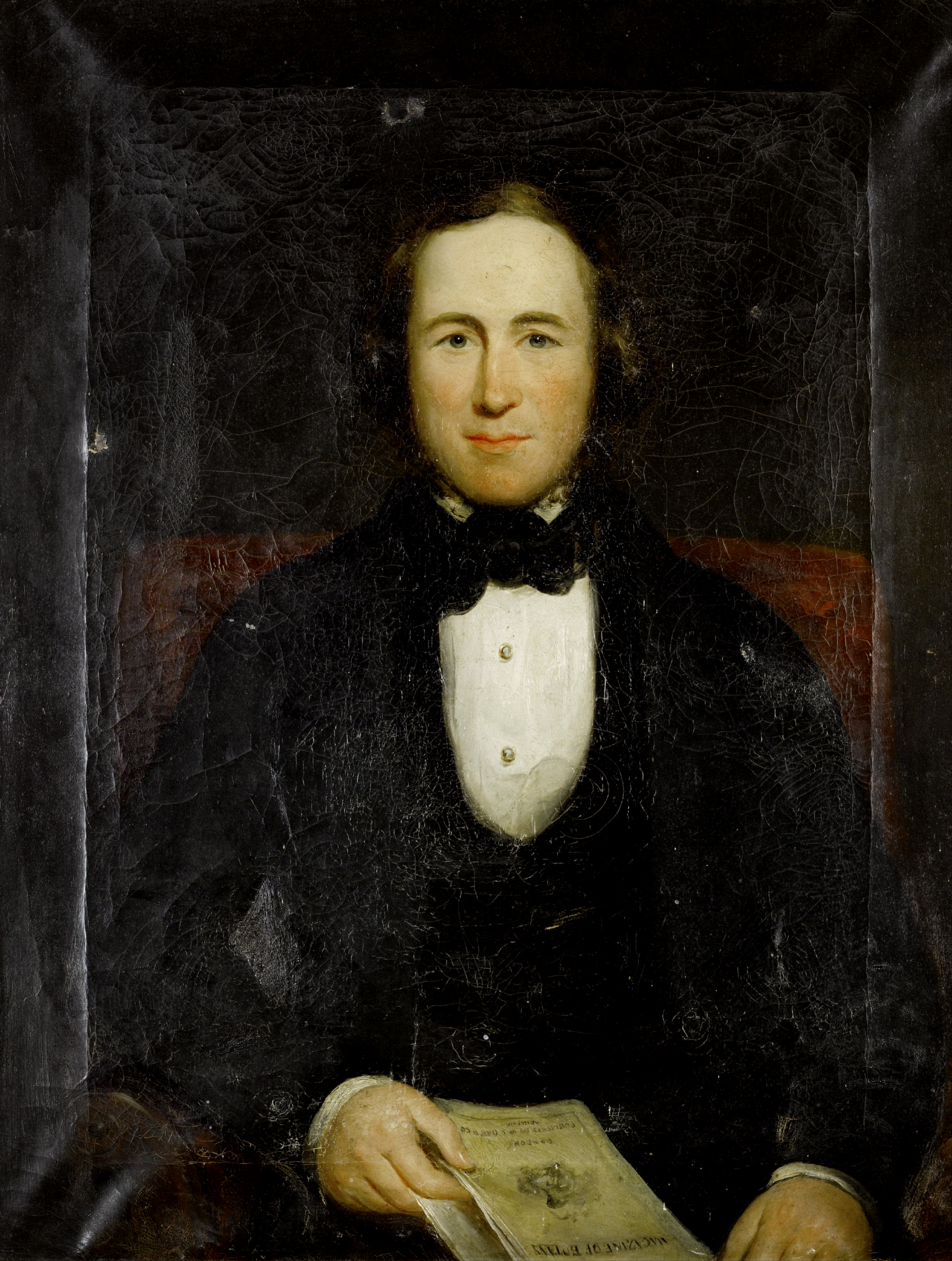
- 1843 Portrait of Joseph Paxton, attributed to Thomas Ellerby.
- Born: January 10, 1797; Low Pasture Farm, Welburn, Kirkbymoorside, England
- Died: April 4, 1861; Retford, Nottinghamshire, England
- Resting place: Unmarked grave, Retford Cemetery, Nottinghamshire
- Education: Royal Academy of Arts
- Known for: Portrait painting
- Style: Portraiture, genre painting
- Spouse(s): Harriet Clarkson (d. 1831); Emily Waring Jenkyns (d. 1848)
- Children: 6
- Parents: Ralph Ellerby (father); Ann Kay (mother)

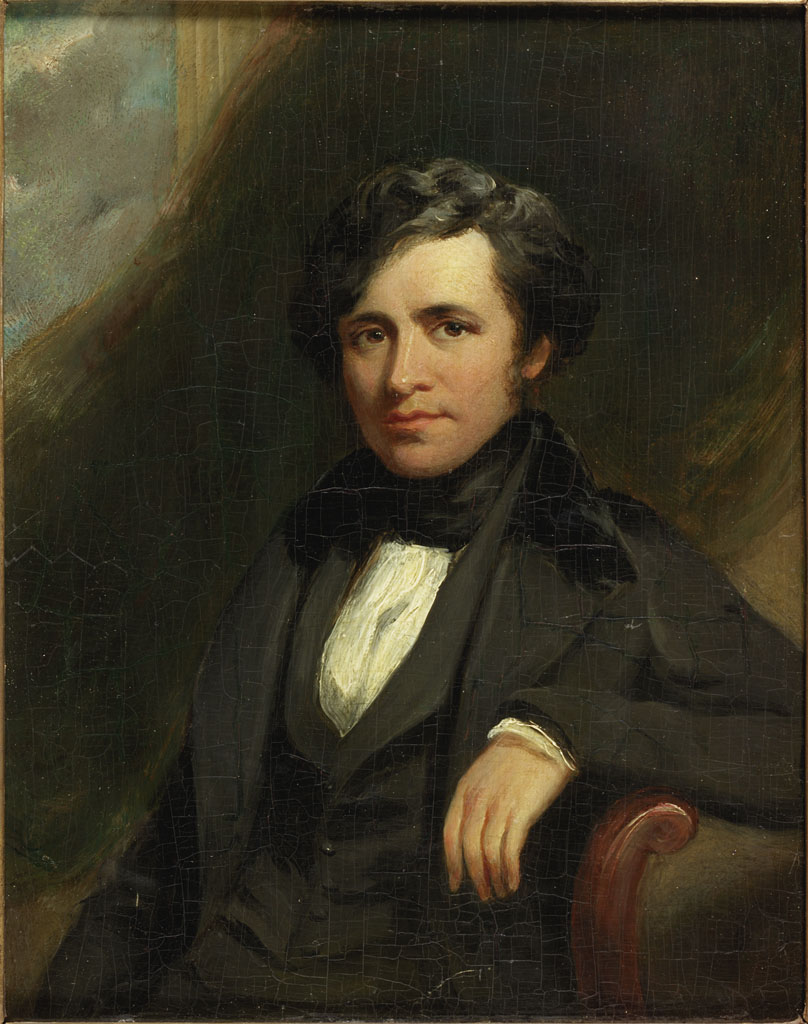
Portrait of John Wilson Carmichael by Thomas Ellerby, 1839.

Thomas Ellerby (10 January 1797 – 4 April 1861) was an English portrait artist whose work included 72 paintings chosen for hanging at The Royal Academy of Arts exhibitions from 1821 until 1857. He remained active as a painter until the end of his life.

== Early life and career ==
Ellerby was born at Low Pasture Farm, Welburn, Kirkbymoorside.

By the age of 24, Ellerby had made his way to London to an address in Hatton Gardens and had his first painting accepted by the R.A. In 1824, a second exhibit at the academy’s exhibition confirmed he had moved to live at 7 Newman Street and had begun a relationship with the North Yorkshire born John Jackson R.A. who would become his mentor and life long friend. The same year, Ellerby began to exhibit at the Royal Academy.

In March, 1825, Ellerby was enrolled at the Royal Academy as a student alongside others who were considerably younger. No records exist to indicate how long he remained a student of the School of Painting.

By 1835 Ellerby had travelled to Italy to continue his studies of the masters of classical painting and on his return he included genre paintings alongside portraits. Sometime during the 1840s his work earned him the acknowledgement that he was becoming the “painter of the Peak”, (the Peak District of Derbyshire), when he painted the Sixth Duke of Devonshire of Chatsworth.

From 1837 until 1840 Ellerby lived, worked and exhibited in the North of England basing himself in Newcastle. Upon his return to London he set up his home in Victoria Grove, Kensington and established his professional address at 34, Gerrard Street, Bloomsbury.

Proposed for admission as an Academician on at least two occasions but without achieving such an acknowledgement by the Royal Academy, Ellerby remained in demand as a portrait artist until he died.

A portrait of James Wilson Carmichael by Ellerby, painted in 1839 is in the South Shields Museum & Art Gallery and a portrait of Joseph Paxton sold at Bonhams in 2011 for £7,200.

== Collections ==
Ellerby's work is included in the collection of the National Portrait Gallery, London, the Laing Art Gallery, the Ferens Art Gallery, the Bradford Museums and Galleries, the York Art Gallery, and the Royal Academy of Arts.

== Personal life ==
Ellerby was the second of three sons from the first marriage of his father, Ralph, a farmer and tanner, who had married Ann, the daughter of the antiquarian rector, William Kay of All Saints', Nunnington, North Yorkshire. Following his Ralph's second marriage to Hannah Blenkhorn in 1802, two step sisters were born.

In his own life, Ellerby was also married twice. His first wife Harriet Clarkson died in 1831 five years after their marriage, following a carriage accident. His second marriage in 1835 was to the daughter of a London stockbroker, Edward Jenkyns. This marriage to Emily Waring Jenkyns, who was sixteen years his junior, having given birth to 3 sons and 3 daughters, ended with her death in 1848 from a heart related condition.

In April 1861, whilst visiting Retford in Nottinghamshire, Ellerby died from bronchitis and severe burns. He was interred four days later in an unmarked grave in the town's cemetery.
