= Sarah Ellerby =

English pool player

Personal information
- Nicknames: Velvet; Ice Maiden
- Born: 24 February 1975 (age 51)

Pool career
- Country: England
- Turned pro: 2000–2008
- Pool games: Eight-ball, Nine-ball

Sarah Ellerby (born 24 February 1975) is an English former professional pool player. She began playing in England, before moving to the United States to play in World Pool-Billiard Association events. In total, Ellerby has won over 100 championships, including the 1997 European Eight-ball Championship. She retired in 2008 whilst ranked number one in the world in eight-ball.

== Career ==
Ellerby was born on 24 February 1975. She started playing cue sports at the age of 12. She was an England international player from 1992 to 1999.

Ellerby played in the United States, and obtained an extraordinary ability visa to relocate there to play. Her flight was diverted to Newfoundland due to the September 11 attacks, and then her plane returned to England. She played eight-ball for most of her career in England but switched to nine-ball in America. Her nickname as a player in the United Kingdom was Velvet, and she changed this to Ice Maiden after she moved. Ellerby was named the 2002 rookie of the year, and in 2003 was ranked 13th.

She retired from competitive play in 2008, when ranked fifth at nine-ball and first at eight-ball, having lost her appetite for the game when her management consultancy became successful, and her mother was diagnosed with breast cancer for the second time.

== Tournament wins ==
Ellerby won over 100 titles. They include the following:

- 1997 European Championship
- 1st Ladies Billiard Association of Florida Tour 2001 #1
- 1st Ladies Billiard Association of Florida Tour 2001 #4
- 1st North East Women's Tour 2001 Event 1
- Ladies Spirit Tour 2002 #2
- Ladies Spirit Tour 2002 #1
- Ladies Spirit Tour 2003 #1
- Ladies Spirit Tour 2003 #7
