= Lisa Ingall =

English snooker player (born 1980)

Personal information
- Born: 29 September 1980 (age 46) England

Sport
- Country: England
- Sport: Snooker
- Highest ranking: 2

Lisa Ingall (born September 29, 1980) is an English snooker player. She was runner-up in the 2000 World Women's Snooker Championship.

== Biography ==
Ingall started playing snooker at the age of 12, and by the age of 16 was practicing four hours a day after school, and for sixteen hours at weekends. She had experienced bullying at school, and transferred to Bromfords Secondary School in Wickford, where she did not have any problems with being bullied. In 1995 and 1996 she played on the girls' snooker circuit, winning four of the seven events and coming second in the other three, to leave her as the top ranked girl player. At the age of 16, and with the endorsement of her parents, she decided to become a professional snooker player, and did not take her GCSEs. She was named as the World Ladies Billiards and Snooker Association Young Junior Player of the year in 1996.

In 2000, Ingall reached the semi-final of the UK Women's championship, losing 0–4 to Kelly Fisher A few months later, she reached her first ranking final, winning past Eva Palmius 4–0, Mary Talbot 4–1, Lisa Quick 4–2, and Sharon Dickson 4–2, to meet Kelly Fisher in the final of the World Ladies Snooker Championship. Ingall won the second frame to level at 1–1 before Fisher won the last three frames to take the match 4–1. Ingall received £2,500 as runner up.

In 2002, Ingall and Kelly Fisher, representing England, won the Home International Series, with 6–0 wins over Northern Ireland, Guernsey, Wales and Scotland 6–0 and a 5–1 win over the Republic of Ireland. They also won the International Challenge, beating both Poland and France 6–0 in qualifying and Wales 4–1 in the final.

== Titles and achievements ==
Outcome	No.	Year	Championship	Opponent	Score	Ref.
Runner-up	1	1994	Halstead Classic (Under-21)	Mary Talbot	w/o	
Runner-up	2	1994	Connie Gough Memorial (Under-21)	Mary Talbot	0–2	
Winner	3	1995	West Norwood Open (Under-21)	Claire Proctor	2–1	
Winner	4	1996	Academy Fork Lift Classic (Under-21)	Katie Henrick	2–0	
Winner	5	1996	Bailey Homes Ladies Classic (Under-21)	Katie Henrick	2–0	
Semi-finalist	6	2000	UK Championship	Kelly Fisher	2–4	
Runner-up	7	2000	Women's World Snooker Championship	Kelly Fisher	1–4	

- 2002 Home International Series – champion, with Kelly Fisher
- 2002 International Challenge – champion, with Kelly Fisher
