= Kathy Parashis =

Australian snooker player (born 1960)

Personal information
- Born: Australia

Sport
- Country: Australia
- Sport: Snooker

Kathy Parashis is an Australian snooker player. The winner of ten women's Australian Open titles, she also reached the quarter finals at the 2006 IBSF World Championships in Amman, Jordan, where she was eliminated by Anuja Thakur 4–1. She was runner-up at the 2009 IBSF Women's Championship.
