= Lisa Quick =

English snooker player

Personal information
- Born: 31 May 1975 (age 51) England

Sport
- Country: England
- Sport: Snooker

Tournament wins
- World Championship: 2001

Lisa Quick (born 31 May 1975) is an English snooker and pool player. She won the World Women's Snooker Championship in 2001, and was runner-up to Kelly Fisher in 2002 and 2003. She also won the WEPF World Eightball Championship in 1999 and 2001.

== Biography ==
Quick began playing cue sports at the age of 13. Having won the world pool championship in 1999 and then the snooker title in 2001, she became first person in either the women's or the men's game to win both titles.

Following her World Snooker Championship victory, Quick told the BBC that she had to return to her job as shop assistant at a newsagent in Weston-Super-Mare the following morning, adding "but don't worry, I will be celebrating my win in style if I can get a day off later in the week."

Quick was named World Snooker's Woman Player of the Year in 2001.

== Titles and achievements ==
Snooker

| Outcome | No. | Year | Championship | Opponent | Score | Ref. |
|---|---|---|---|---|---|---|
| Runner-up | 1 | 1994 | Pontins Ladies' Bowl champion | Karen Corr | 1–4 | |
| Runner-up | 2 | 1997 | Applecentre Classics | Kelly Fisher | 2–4 | |
| Runner-up | 3 | 1998 | Grand Prix | Kelly Fisher | 0–4 | |
| Winner | 4 | 1999 | Regal Welsh Open | Tessa Davidson | 4–1 | |
| Winner | 5 | 2001 | CCI Women's Invitation Snooker Tournament | Kelly Fisher | 5–2 | |
| Runner-up | 6 | 2001 | LG Cup | Kelly Fisher | 1–4 | |
| Winner | 7 | 2001 | Regal Welsh Open | Lynette Horsburgh | 4–0 | |
| Winner | 8 | 2001 | Women's World Snooker Championship | Lynette Horsburgh | 4–2 | |
| Runner-up | 9 | 2002 | Women's World Snooker Championship | Kelly Fisher | 1–4 | |
| Runner-up | 10 | 2003 | Women's World Snooker Championship | Kelly Fisher | 1–4 | |

Pool

| Outcome | No. | Year | Championship | Opponent | Score | Ref. |
|---|---|---|---|---|---|---|
| Winner | 1 | 1999 | WEPF World Eightball Championship | Linda Leadbitter | 8-3 | |
| Winner | 2 | 2001 | WEPF World Eightball Championship | Linda Leadbitter | 8-6 | |
| Runner-up | 3 | 2002 | WEPF World Eightball Championship | Sue Thompson | 3-8 | |
| Runner-up | 4 | 2003 | WEPF World Eightball Championship | Sue Thompson | 3-8 | |
