= Anna Lynch (billiards player) =

Snooker and billiards player

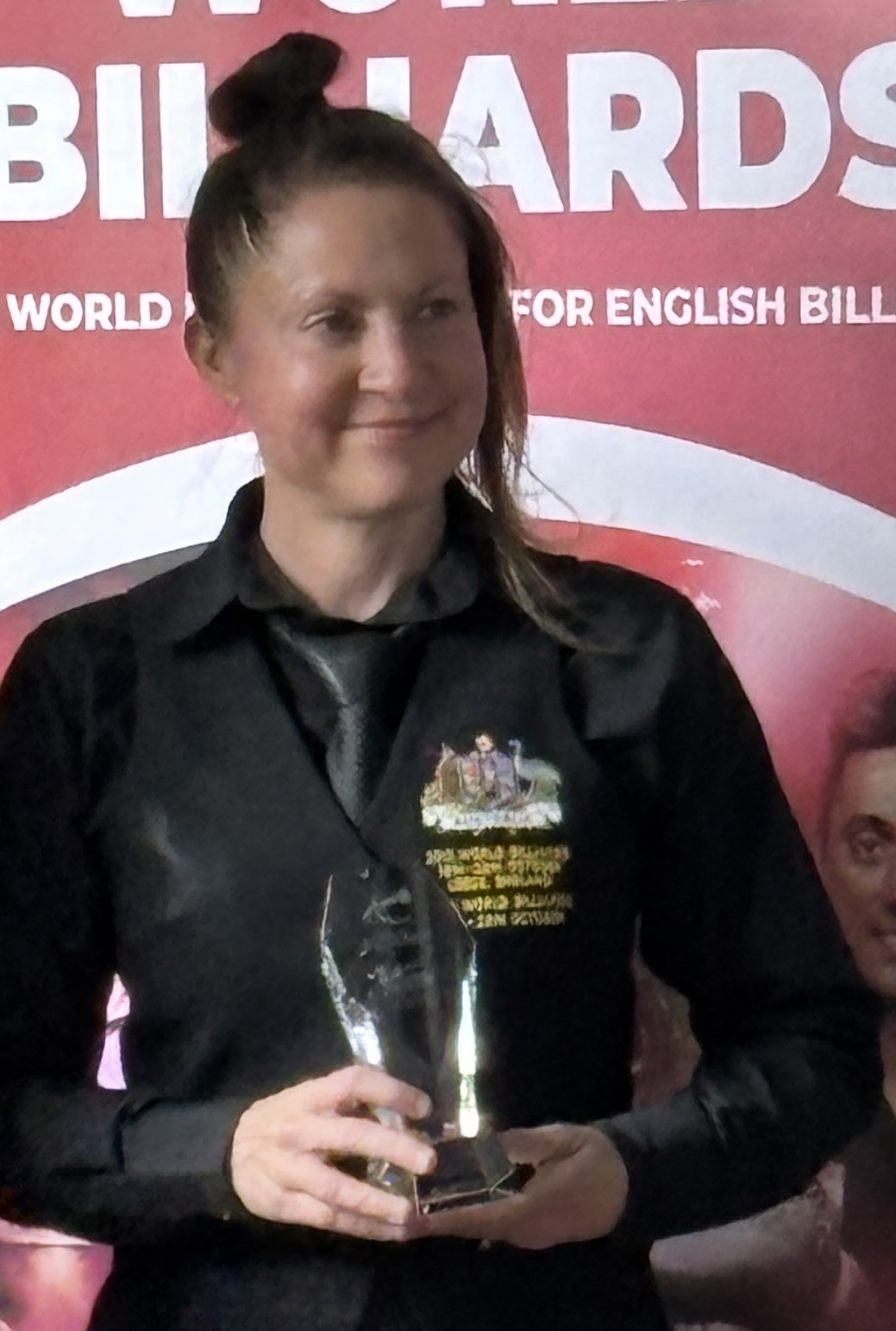
- Born: c. 1976
- Sport country: Australia
- World Women's Billiards Champion: 2019

Anna Lynch (born c. 1976) is an Australian player of English billiards and snooker. She won the 2019 World Women's Billiards Championship with a 244–204 defeat of Judy Dangerfield, becoming the first Australian woman to win a world billiards title, and was runner-up to Shruthi L in 2025. Lynch is also a professional jazz pianist and music teacher.

She began competing in snooker tournaments in 2001 and won sixteen Victorian women's billiards titles between 2003 and 2019. In 2015, she reached the final of the Oceania Women's Six-red snooker Championship and the semi-finals of the International Billiards and Snooker Federation World Women's Billiards Championship. She won the Australian National Women's Billiards Championship in 2019 and three consecutive Women's Billiards Tour events in 2021: the Irish Open, English Open and Irish Masters.

== Career ==
=== Background and early career ===
Anna Lynch was born c. 1976 and is a professional jazz pianist and music teacher. She has also worked as a concert pianist. She played eight-ball pool at venues where she performed as a teenager and in her twenties. In a 2019 interview, she contrasted these casual games with her subsequent approach to playing on a full-sized table, which she said required more attention to ball position. Lynch has said that the discipline and solitary practice involved in playing piano helped her approach to billiards. In a 2022 interview, she described piano as her principal activity and billiards as a hobby that had taken up an increasing part of her life.

She entered her first snooker tournament in 2001, about seven months after taking up the game, after the owner of a pool hall suggested that she contact the Victorian Billiards and Snooker Association. She was runner-up in the Victorian Women's Billiards Championship in 2002 and won the tournament sixteen times between 2003 and 2019, taking the title every year except 2014. She was runner-up to Kathy Howden in the Victorian Women's Snooker Championship in both 2015 and 2016.

In March 2015, she was runner-up in the Oceania Women's Six-red snooker Championship in Auckland, losing the final 3–4 to Suzy Bussanich, after beating Howden 4–2 in the semi-finals. In September that year, she was a semi-finalist at the International Billiards and Snooker Federation (IBSF) World Women's Billiards Championship in Adelaide, where she lost 274–382 to Revanna Umadevi.

=== 2019 to present: national and world titles ===
In August 2019, Lynch won the Australian National Women's Billiards Championship. She won all three one-hour matches in her qualifying group, with an average points difference of 116. In the ninety-minute semi-final, she beat Lyndal Ellement 270–195, and in the ninety-minute final, won 255–222 against Caroline Ruscitti. Lynch made the two highest breaks of the tournament, 54 and 34.

Lynch entered the 2019 World Billiards Championship, and was the only woman to compete. She had one win, 232–213 against New Zealand's Zac Guja, during which she made a break of 57. She did not progress from her qualifying group.

At the 2019 World Women's Billiards Championship held at Melbourne's Royal Automobile Club of Victoria in October 2019, Lynch won all four of the matches in her qualifying group, aggregating a total of 883 points to 279 for her opponents, for an average difference of 151. In the semi-final, Lynch beat Jennifer Budd 287–155. She recorded a 244–204 victory over Judy Dangerfield to win the title. The victory made her the first Australian woman to become a world billiards champion and the sixth Australian player to win a world billiards title. She made the four highest breaks of the tournament: 42, 39, 37 and 36.

During Victoria's COVID-19 lockdown, Lynch stayed with her family in Warrnambool and taught music lessons over Zoom. After looking for full-sized billiards tables in the area, she began practising at the Warrnambool Senior Citizens Club in the Archie Graham Centre. In April 2021, she was training there while seeking a travel exemption to join her partner in the United Kingdom.

In September 2021, Lynch reached the knockout stage of the English Open billiards tournament after winning two group matches, before losing to Mark Hirst. She won the inaugural ranking event on the World Billiards Women's Tour, the 2021 Women's Irish Open, defeating Annette Newman in the final. Victory at the Women's English Open followed, with her beating Lauren McNamee in the semi-final and Rochy Woods in the final. Her victory over Newman in the Women's Irish Masters final later that year was her third consecutive title on the women's tour.

She reached the last 16 of the 2022 World Women's Snooker (WWS) British Open; as of October 2025 that is her best finish in a main WWS tournament. Lynch married fellow billiards player Rob Hall at Copenhagen City Hall in April 2022. She won another Australian women's billiards championship that year. At the inaugural Women's European Open in Leeds in 2022, Lynch defeated Woods 188–116 in the semi-final before losing 143–189 to Jamie Hunter in the final. In August, she remained in Warrnambool while awaiting a visa to return to the United Kingdom and was unable to attend some overseas tournaments. She partnered with Lilly Meldrum in the Australian team for the 2023 Women's Snooker World Cup in Bangkok; they lost all three of their qualifying group matches by 1–4 margins.

There was no World Women's Billiards Championship held in 2020, 2021 or 2023, and she did not participate in 2022. She was the top seed for the 2024 edition at the Landywood Snooker Club in England, but failed to progress from the group stage, defeating Michelle Cohen but losing to both eventual finalists Shruthi L and Keerath Bhandaal. At the 2025 World Women's Billiards Championship, she won all three of her group matches and then defeated Eva Palmius in the semi-finals. The final between Lynch and Shruthi L was closely contested for the first hour, before Shruthi pulled away in the closing half-hour to secure the title. Following the championship, World Billiards ranked Lynch second behind Shruthi on its 2025–26 women's world ranking list.

== Titles and achievements ==
=== Snooker ===
Selected snooker finals
Outcome	Year	Tournament	Opponent	Score	Ref.
Runner-up	2015	Oceania Women's Six-red Snooker Championship	Suzy Bussanich	3–4	

=== Billiards ===
Selected billiards finals
Outcome	Year	Tournament	Opponent	Score	Ref.
Winner	2019	Australian National Women's Billiards Championship	Caroline Ruscitti	255–222	
Winner	2019	World Women's Billiards Championship	Judy Dangerfield	244–204	
Winner	2021	Women's Irish Open	Annette Newman	178–87	
Winner	2021	Women's English Open	Rochy Woods	215–164	
Winner	2021	Women's Irish Masters	Annette Newman	166–114	
Runner-up	2022	Women's European Open	Jamie Hunter	143–189	
Runner-up	2025	World Women's Billiards Championship	Shruthi L	222–347	
