= Shruthi L =

Indian player of English billiards

- Shruthi with championship trophies in 2025
- Born: 2007 (age 18–19); Chennai, Tamil Nadu, India
- Sport country: India
- World Women's Billiards Champion: 2024, 2025, 2026

Shruthi Lakshminarayanan (born 2007) is an Indian player of English billiards, snooker and pool. She won the World Women's Billiards Championship in 2024 and retained the title in 2025, and was subsequently ranked world number one on the World Billiards women's ranking list. She won the title again in 2026, defeating Eva Palmius in the final.

Based in Chennai, Tamil Nadu, Shruthi took up cue sports in 2021 and has since won national junior titles in billiards, snooker and nine-ball pool, as well as the 2025 English Open Challenge Cup. She has also competed at senior level in Heyball, reaching the semi-finals of the 2026 Indian National Championship.

== Early life ==
Shruthi Lakshminarayanan was born in 2007 in Chennai, Tamil Nadu, India. She began playing cue sports in January 2021 after playing on a pool table while visiting her uncle in Bengaluru. She joined Buddys Chennai Billiards Academy in March 2021 and began training under coach Abinav Krishna. By 2023, she was training at the academy four days a week as well as practising at home.

She won the Indian girls' Sub-junior National Billiards Championship in 2022, defeating Saanvi Shah 112–106 in a one-hour match. Shruthi took the lead, but fell behind before securing victory in the final minute of the contest.

The following year, she won the Indian Junior Girls' National Billiards Championship, defeating Aanya Patel with a score of 179–93 in the final. Shruthi commented afterwards, "It feels special to win at home. I’m grateful for all the support from my parents, coach and the Tamil Nadu billiards and snooker community." In an interview that month, she said, "If you look at billiards as a game, it's very creative. There are three modes of scoring. And there isn't any particular pattern as to how you have to play; you can be as creative as you want. I like that a lot." Shruthi received a High Cash Incentive Award from the Sports Development Authority of Tamil Nadu (SDAT) in 2023. She later credited this with motivating her as well as financially allowing her to play overseas.

== World Women's Billiards Champion and recent career ==
In 2024, Shruthi won the World Women's Billiards Championship, which was held at the Landywood Snooker Club, Walsall, England. Starting as the lowest-ranked player in the competition, she won all three of her matches in the group stage, defeating 2019 champion Anna Lynch 256–203, Keerath Bhandaal 201–173, and Michelle Cohen 311–142. In her semi-final match, she eliminated three-time finalist Eva Palmius 276–148. In the final, she faced Bhandaal again, and won 215–202 to take the title. After the match, she posted "Thanks to my coach Abinav of #Buddys for making this happen."

In November 2024, she competed in the World Junior Heyball Championship. After defeating Cedar Gauthier 6–0 in the group stage, she lost 3–6 to Natasha Chetan in the quarter-finals.

She won the 2025 English Open Challenge Cup, defeating Adam Clarke by a single point in the final after having eliminated world number 11 Terry Azor in the first round. At the 2025 World Billiards Championship she qualified for the knockout stages after three wins in four matches in her qualifying group including a 298–282 win against world number 12 Chris Mitchell.

She retained the Women's World Championship in 2025. She won all three of her matches in her qualifying group, against Eva Palmius, Michelle Cohen and Annette Newman, and made four half-century break including a 56, which was the highest of the competition. After defeating Bhandaal 308–176 in the semi-finals, Shruthi beat Lynch 347–222 in the final. The final was closely contested for the first hour, before Shruthi pulled away in the closing half-hour to secure the win. Following the championship, World Billiards ranked Shruthi first on its 2025–26 women's world ranking list with 3,750 ranking points, ahead of Lynch and Bhandaal.

In January 2026, she finished third at the Indian National Billiards Championship, losing 146–160 to Amee Kamani but then defeating R. Umadevi 152–140 in the bronze medal playoff. She won her first Indian junior girls' national snooker title, defeating Aanya Patel 3–0 in the final. Two months later, she won the Indian Junior Girls' Nine-ball Championship on her debut in the event. She defeated defending champion Natasha Chethan 6–4 in the final.

At the Indian Heyball National Championships in July 2026, Shruthi finished third in the women's event. She defeated Neena Praveen 6–4 in the quarter-final, lost 5–2 to eventual champion Natasha Chethan in the semi-final and defeated Vidya Pillai 5–0 in the third-place playoff. She was a semi-finalist in six-red snooker at the 2026 Commonwealth Cue Sports Championships, beating Jessica Woods and Simone Lloyd before losing 2–3 to Keerthana Pandian.

She secured the World Women's Billiards Championship for a third consecutive year in 2026. She won all four of her matches in the qualifying round-robin, and made a break of 89 against Palmius. She faced Palmius again in the final, and made breaks of 82, 57 and 105 on her way to a 414-153 victory.

== Achievements ==
=== English Billiards ===
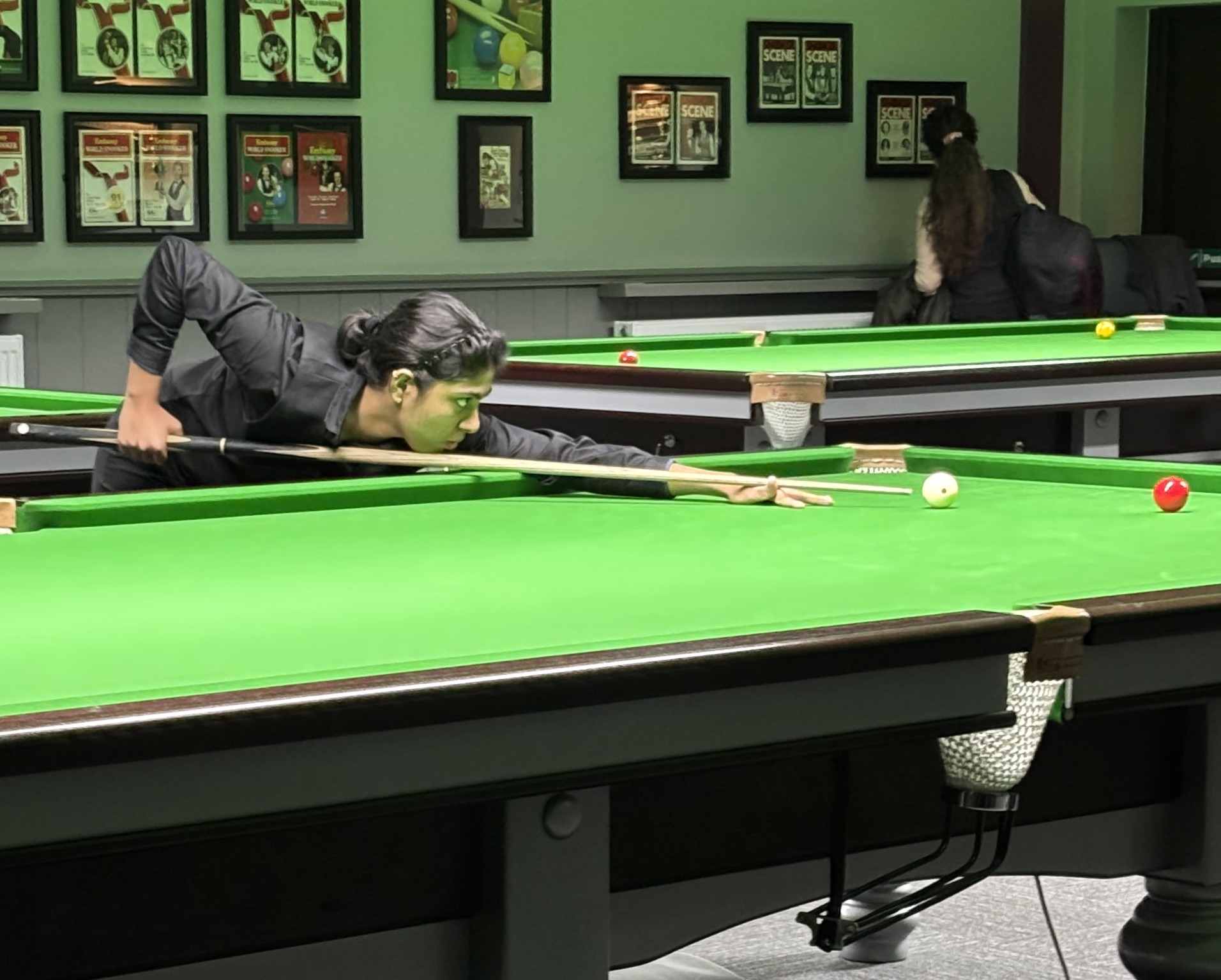
Shruthi L at the 2025 World Women's Billiards Championship

World Billiards finals contested by Shruthi L
| Outcome | Year | Championship | Opponent in the final | Score | Ref. |
|---|---|---|---|---|---|
| Winner | 2024 | World Women's Billiards Championship | Keerath Bhandaal (IND) | 215–202 | |
| Winner | 2025 | English Open – Challenge Cup (Note: For players who did not reach the knockout stage of the English Open) | Adam Clarke (ENG) | 179–178 | |
| Winner | 2025 | World Women's Billiards Championship | Anna Lynch (AUS) | 347–222 | |
| Winner | 2026 | World Women's Billiards Championship | Eva Palmius (SWE) | 414–153 | |

Indian national finals contested by Shruthi L
| Outcome | Year | Championship | Opponent in the final | Score | Ref. |
|---|---|---|---|---|---|
| Winner | 2022 | Sub-junior Billiards Championship | Saanvi Shah (IND) | 112–106 | |
| Winner | 2023 | Junior Billiards Championship | Aanya Patel (IND) | 179–93 | |
| Winner | 2024 (Note: Actually played in January 2025) | Sub-junior Billiards Championship | Natasha Chetan (IND) | unknown | |

State finals contested by Shruthi L
| Outcome | Year | Championship | Opponent in the final | Score | Ref. |
|---|---|---|---|---|---|
| Winner | 2023 | Tamil Nadu Sub-junior Billiards Championship | Abel Maria Benny (IND) | 251–34 | |
| Winner | 2023 | Tamil Nadu Junior Billiards Championship | Snethra Babu (IND) | 118–18 | |
| Winner | 2023 | Tamil Nadu Billiards Championship | Snethra Babu (IND) | 3–0 (sets) | |
| Runner-up | 2024 | Tamil Nadu Billiards Championship | Anupama Ramachandran (IND) | 1–3 (sets of 75-up) | |

=== Snooker ===
Indian national finals contested by Shruthi L
| Outcome | Year | Championship | Opponent in the final | Score | Ref. |
|---|---|---|---|---|---|
| Runner-up | 2024–25 | Sub-junior Snooker Championship | Natasha Chetan (IND) | unknown | |
| Runner-up | 2024–25 | Junior Snooker Championship | Aanya Patel (IND) | unknown | |
| Winner | 2026 | Junior Snooker Championship | Aanya Patel (IND) | 3–0 | |

State finals contested by Shruthi L
| Outcome | Year | Championship | Opponent in the final | Score | Ref. |
|---|---|---|---|---|---|
| Runner-up | 2023 | Tamil Nadu Sub-junior Snooker Championship | Afeefa Thabassam (IND) | 0–2 | |
| Winner | 2023 | Tamil Nadu Junior Snooker Championship | R.T. Mohitha (IND) | 2–0 | |
| Runner-up | 2024 | Tamil Nadu Snooker Championship | Anupama Ramachandran (IND) | 1–3 | |

=== Pool ===
Indian national finals contested by Shruthi L
| Outcome | Year | Championship | Opponent in the final | Score | Ref. |
|---|---|---|---|---|---|
| Winner | 2026 | Indian Junior Girls' Nine-ball Championship | Natasha Chethan (IND) | 6–4 | |
