= World Women's Billiards Championship =

English billiards world championship

Tournament information
- Established: 1931
- Organisation(s): World Billiards
- Recent edition: 2026
- Current champion: Shruthi L (IND)

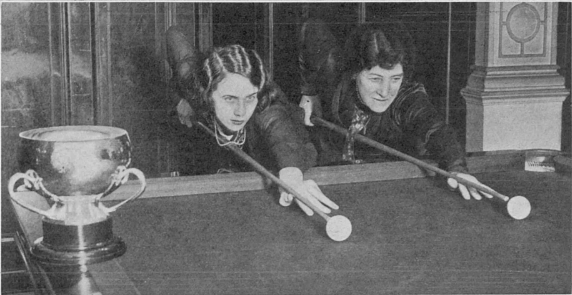
Ruth Harrison (left) and Ellen Eddowes, finalists in the 1931 Championship

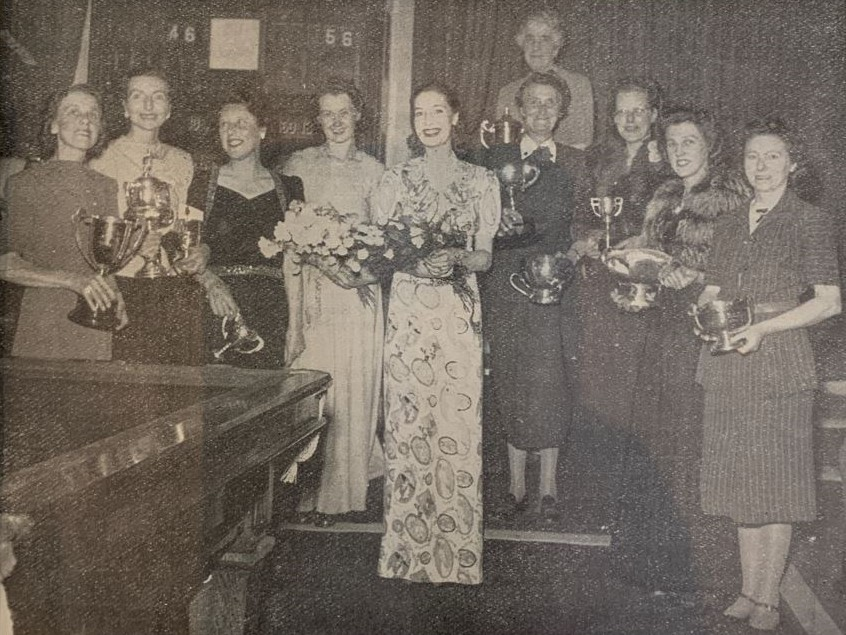
The 1948 Women's Billiards Association awards ceremony. Pictured (left to right) are Ruth Harrison (inaugural champion), Thelma Carpenter (three-time champion), Joyce Gardner, Agnes Morris, Valerie Hobson, Evelyn Morland-Smith (four-time champion), Beryl Stamper, Joan Adcock, E. Peters. Back row: Gladys Burton (twice runner-up)

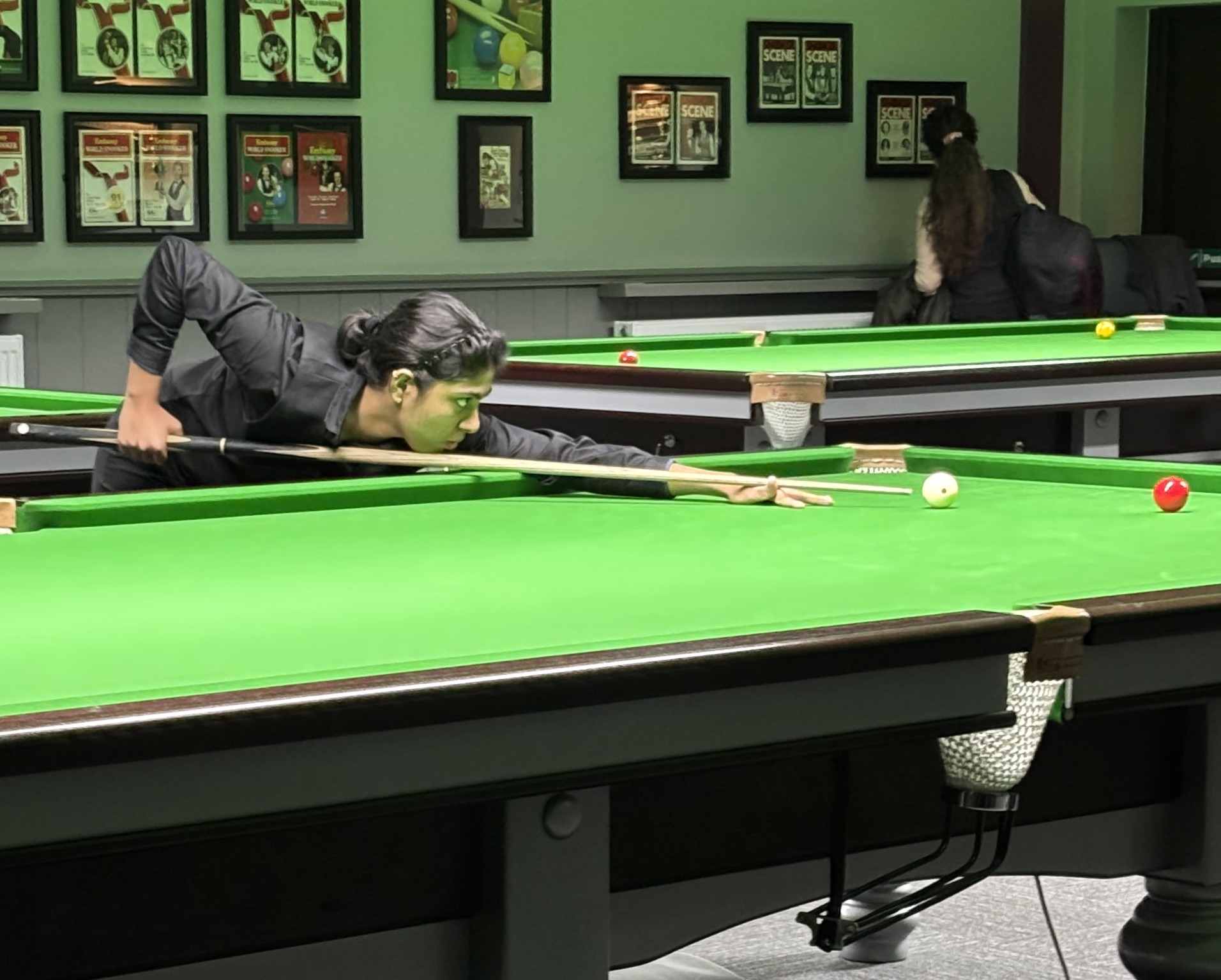
Shruthi L at the 2025 championship

English billiards, known in Britain as just billiards, was developed by around 1800 as a combination of earlier cue sports. Matches are played either across specified time periods, or to a specified number of points. As of 1930, many billiard halls in the UK did not admit women. That year, the British cue sports company Burroughes and Watts organised the first edition of what would become the Women's Professional Billiards Championship and then announced a Women's Amateur Billiards Championship, later recognised as the World Women's Billiards Championship. The first rounds of the amateur tournament would be played at regional venues, with the regional winners qualifying for the semi-finals and final at Burroughes Hall in London. Ruth Harrison was the champion from 23 participants, and the highest break made was 28.

The Women's Billiards Association took over responsibility for the amateur tournament from the 1932 edition, which had 41 entries. Thelma Carpenter made the highest break, 45, on her way to winning the title. Carpenter won in 1933 and 1934 to complete a hat-trick of victories, before turning professional. Vera Seals, a receptionist from Chesterfield who had learnt the game from male world professional billiards champion Joe Davis, took the 1935 amateur title, and set a new highest break record of 62. The tournament was held regularly until 1940, but then put on hold until after World War II. From 1947 to 1980 the tournament was held most years, with Vera Selby winning eight titles, and Maureen Baynton (née Barrett) winning six. Evelyn Morland-Smith was another player to win multiple titles; her last was in 1959 when she was 75.

After a period of dormancy from 1980, the tournament was revived by the World Ladies' Billiards and Snooker Association (WLBSA) in 1998, and Karen Corr won the first of two titles. The WLBSA became a subsidiary organisation of the World Professional Billiards and Snooker Association in 2015, and was renamed World Women's Snooker in 2019. As of 2024, World Billiards, another subsidiary company of the World Professional Billiards and Snooker Association, runs the competition. Emma Bonney has won the title a record 13 times, between 2000 and 2018. The 2026 champion was Shruthi L who defeated Eva Palmius 414–153.

== Finals ==
World Women's Billiards Championship finals
Year	Organiser	Winner	Runner-up	Final score	Venue	Ref.
1931	Burroughes and Watts	Ruth Harrison (ENG)	Ellen Eddowes (ENG)	1,000-581	Burroughes Hall, London	
1932	WBA	Thelma Carpenter (ENG)	Ethel Brown (ENG)	1,000-730	Burroughes Hall, London	
1933	WBA	Thelma Carpenter (ENG)	Vera Seals (ENG)	1,000-552	Burroughes Hall, London	
1934	WBA	Thelma Carpenter (ENG)	Vera Seals (ENG)	1,200–915	Burroughes Hall, London	
1935	WBA	Vera Seals (ENG)	Evelyn Morland-Smith (ENG)	1,000-499	Burroughes Hall, London	
1936	WBA	Vera Seals (ENG)	Ella Morris (ENG)	1,000-528	Burroughes Hall, London	
1937	WBA	Grace Phillips (ENG)	Vera Seals (ENG)	1,000-968	Burroughes Hall, London	
1938 (Note: Held in November 1937)	WBA	Victoria McDougall (ENG)	Evelyn Morland-Smith (ENG)	1,000-991	Burroughes Hall, London	
1939	WBA	Victoria McDougall (ENG)	G M Saunders (ENG)	674–563	Burroughes Hall, London	
1940–46	Not held					
1947	WBA	Sadie Isaacs (ENG)	Doris Keene (ENG)	373–335	Empire Club, Shaftesbury Avenue, London	
1948	WBA	Evelyn Morland-Smith (ENG)	Gladys Burton (ENG)	537–399	Thurston's Hall, London	
1949	WBA	Marie Keeton (ENG)	Gladys Burton (ENG)	455–398	Burroughes Hall, London	
1950	WBA	Helen Futo (ENG)	Sadie Isaacs (ENG)	420–359	Burroughes Hall, London	
1951	Not held					
1952 (Note: Held in October 1951)	WBA	Evelyn Morland-Smith (ENG)	Helen Futo (ENG)	431–408	Burroughes Hall, London	
1953	WBA	Evelyn Morland-Smith (ENG)	Helen Futo (ENG)	411–388	Burroughes Hall, London	
1954	WBA	Helen Futo (ENG)	Maureen Barrett (ENG)	448–430	Burroughes Hall, London	
1955	WBA	Maureen Barrett (ENG)	Evelyn Morland-Smith (ENG)	451–401	Burroughes Hall, London	
1956 (Note: Held in October 1955)	WBA	Maureen Barrett (ENG)	unknown	unknown	Burroughes Hall, London	
1957	WBA	Maureen Barrett (ENG)	Evelyn Morland-Smith (ENG)	553–334	Burroughes Hall, London	
1958	Not held					
1959	WBA	Evelyn Morland-Smith (ENG)	Ray Craven (ENG) (Note: The spelling Rae is also found in some sources for this player, e.g. The Liverpool Daily Post and The Birmingham Post in 1964,)	330–328	Burroughes Hall, London	
1960	WBA	Muriel Hazeldene (ENG) (Note: The spellings Hazeldine, e.g. in the Birmingham Evening Mail in 1960, and Hezeldene, e.g., in the Birmingham Evening Mail in 1975 are also found in some sources for this player.)	Ray Craven (ENG)	339–324	Burroughes Hall, London	
1961	WBA	Maureen Barrett (ENG)	Thea Hindmarch (ENG)	542–506	Burroughes Hall, London	
1962	WBA	Thea Hindmarch (ENG)	Ray Craven (ENG)	438–385	Burroughes Hall, London	
1963	WBA	Sadie Isaacs (ENG)	Ray Craven (ENG)	485–315	Burroughes Hall, London	
1964	WBA	Maureen Baynton (née Barrett) (ENG)	Ray Craven (ENG)	649–336	Burroughes Hall, London	
1965	WBA	Vera Youle (ENG)	Ray Craven (ENG)	393–386	Burroughes Hall, London	
1966	WBA	Maureen Baynton (née Barrett) (ENG)	Vera Youle (ENG)	514–319	Burroughes Hall, London	
1967	WBA	Thea Hindmarch (ENG)	Sally Bartley (ENG)	416–319	Burroughes Hall, London	
1968	WBA	Maureen Baynton (née Barrett) (ENG)	Ray Craven (ENG)	434–265	Billiards and Snooker Centre, Great Windmill Street, London	
1969	WBA	Thea Hindmarch (ENG)	Vera Selby (ENG)	452–409	Billiards and Snooker Centre, Great Windmill Street, London	
1970	WBA	Vera Selby (ENG)	unknown	unknown	unknown	
1971	WBA	Vera Selby (ENG)	Ray Craven (ENG)	506–304	Billiards and Snooker Centre, Great Windmill Street, London	
1972	WBA	Vera Selby (ENG)	Ray Craven (ENG)	736–354	London	
1973	WBA	Vera Selby (ENG)	Ray Craven (ENG)	w.o.	n/a	
1974	WBA	Vera Selby (ENG)	Thea Hindmarch (ENG)	unknown	Windmill Billiards Club, London	
1975	Not held					
1976	WBA	Vera Selby (ENG)	Ray Craven (ENG)	407–157	unknown	
1977	WBA	Vera Selby (ENG)	unknown	unknown	unknown	
1978	WBA	Vera Selby (ENG)	Maureen Baynton (née Barrett) (ENG)	366–319	Fishers, Acton, London	
1979	WBA	Maureen Baynton (née Barrett) (ENG)	Vera Selby (ENG)	unknown (Note: Snooker Scene has 697–683 but Newcastle Evening Chronicle has 500–486)	British Rail Staff Association, Gateshead	
1980–97	Not held					
1998	WLBSA	Karen Corr (NIR)	Emma Bonney (ENG)	403–219	Radion Executive Club, Sheffield	
1999	WLBSA	Karen Corr (NIR)	Kelly Fisher (ENG)	354–276	Radion Executive Club, Sheffield	
2000	WLBSA	Emma Bonney (ENG)	Caroline Walch (ENG)	218–50	Radion Executive Club, Sheffield	
2001	WLBSA	Kelly Fisher (ENG)	Emma Bonney (ENG)	290–219	Jesters Snooker Hall, Swindon	
2002	WLBSA	Emma Bonney (ENG)	Kelly Fisher (ENG)	227–196	Jesters Snooker Hall, Swindon	
2003	WLBSA	Kelly Fisher (ENG)	Emma Bonney (ENG)	299–155	Jesters Snooker Hall, Swindon	
2004	Not held					
2005	WLBSA	Anuja Thakur (IND)	Lynette Horsburgh (SCO)	243–136	Cambridge Snooker Centre	
2006	WLBSA	Chitra Magimairaj (IND)	Emma Bonney (ENG)	193–164	Cambridge Snooker Centre	
2007	WLBSA	Chitra Magimairaj (IND)	Emma Bonney (ENG)	187–148	Cambridge Snooker Centre	
2008	WLBSA	Emma Bonney (ENG)	Eva Palmius (SWE)	216–119	Cambridge Snooker Centre	
2009	WLBSA	Emma Bonney (ENG)	Chitra Magimairaj (IND)	272–118	Cambridge Snooker Centre	
2010	WLBSA	Emma Bonney (ENG)	Chitra Magimairaj (IND)	269–220	Stadium Snooker Club, Birmingham	
2011	WLBSA	Emma Bonney (ENG)	Tina Owen-Sevilton (ENG)	202–181	Pot Black Sports Bar, Bury St Edmunds	
2012	WLBSA	Revanna Umadevi (IND)	Emma Bonney (ENG)	201–143	Cambridge Snooker Centre	
2013	WLBSA	Emma Bonney (ENG)	Eva Palmius (SWE)	329–207	Cambridge Snooker Centre	
2014 (April)	WLBSA	Emma Bonney (ENG)	Revanna Umadevi (IND)	226–209	Northern Snooker Centre, Leeds	
2014 (October)	WLBSA, World Billiards	Emma Bonney (ENG)	Revanna Umadevi (IND)	237–191	Northern Snooker Centre, Leeds	
2015	WLBSA, World Billiards	Emma Bonney (ENG)	Rochy Woods (ENG)	334–119	Northern Snooker Centre, Leeds	
2016	WLBSA, World Billiards	Emma Bonney (ENG)	Revanna Umadevi (IND)	239–169	Northern Snooker Centre, Leeds	
2017	World Billiards	Emma Bonney (ENG)	Eva Palmius (SWE)	295–185	Northern Snooker Centre, Leeds	
2018	World Billiards	Emma Bonney (ENG)	Rebecca Kenna (ENG)	329–209	Northern Snooker Centre, Leeds	
2019	World Billiards	Anna Lynch (AUS)	Judy Dangerfield (AUS)	244–204	Royal Automobile Club of Victoria, Melbourne	
2020–21	Not held					
2022	World Billiards	Jamie Hunter (ENG)	Snenthra Babu (IND)	304–148	Sharkx Academy, Newbridge	
2023	Not held					
2024	World Billiards	Shruthi L (IND)	Keerath Bhandaal (IND)	215–202	Landywood Snooker Club, Great Wyrley	
2025	World Billiards	Shruthi L (IND)	Anna Lynch (AUS)	347–222	Landywood Snooker Club, Great Wyrley	
2026	World Billiards	Shruthi L (IND)	Eva Palmius (SWE)	414–153	Landywood Snooker Club, Great Wyrley	

== Wins by player ==
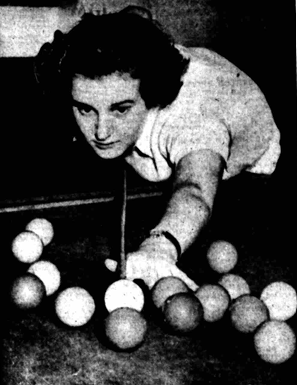
Maureen Baynton (pictured in 1953) won eight titles between 1955 and 1979.

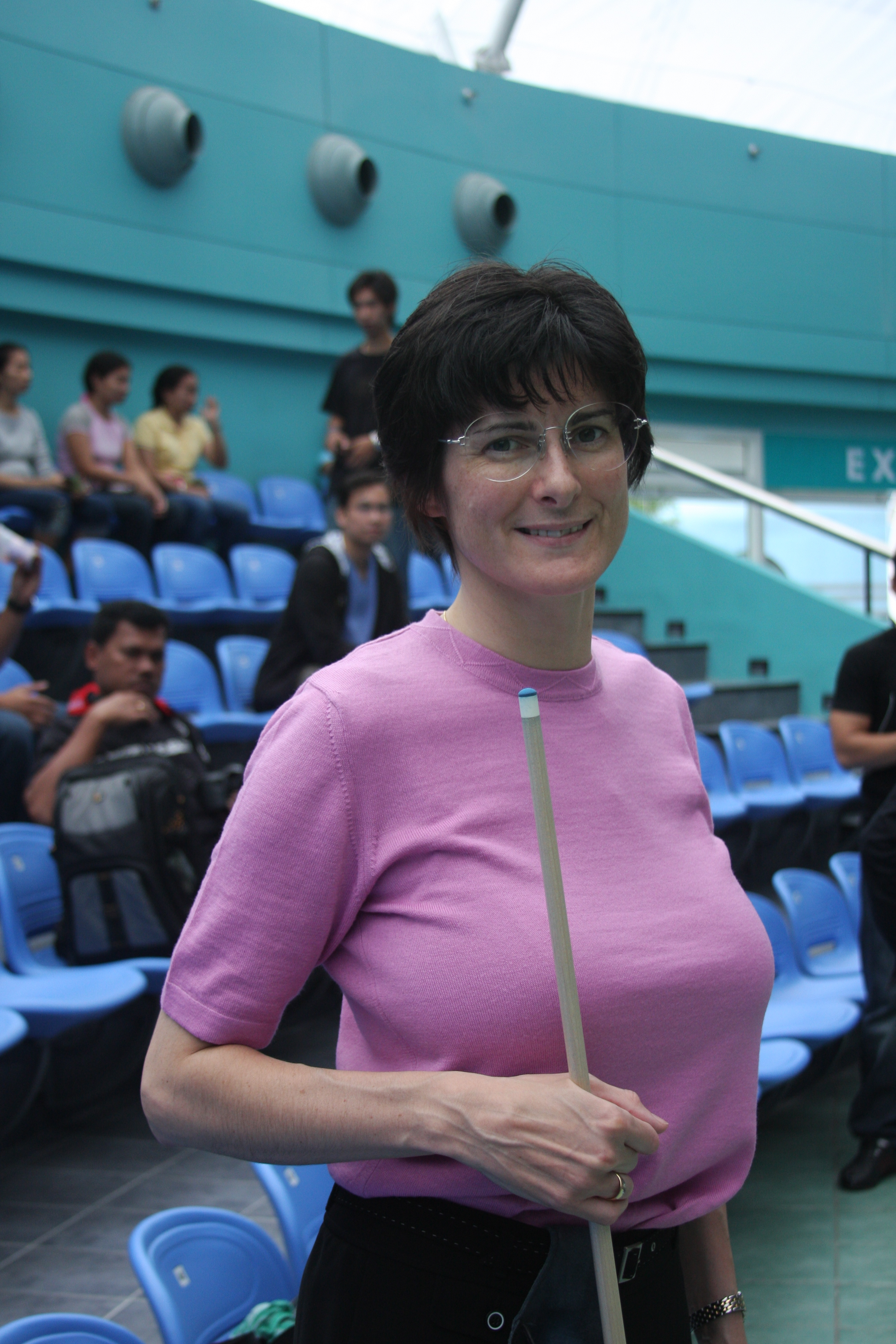
Karen Corr (pictured in 2009) won the title when the championship was revived in 1998 and retained the title in 1999.

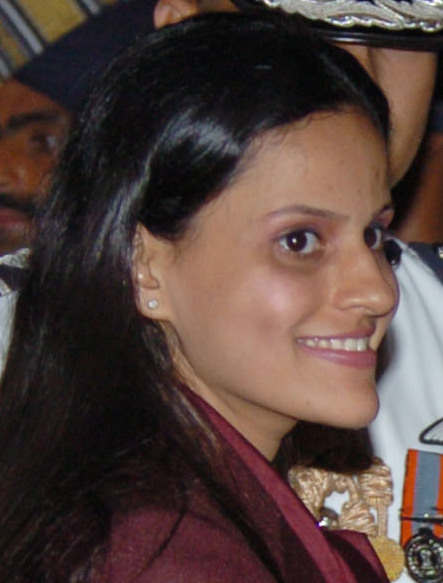
In 2005, Anuja Thakur (pictured) from India became the first non-British woman to win the tournament.

Finalists in the World Women's Billiards Championship
Name	Country	Wins	Runners-up
Emma Bonney	England	13	6
Vera Selby	England	8	2
Maureen Baynton (née Barrett)	England	8	2
Evelyn Morland-Smith	England	4	4
Thelma Carpenter	England	3	0
Thea Hindmarch	England	3	2
Shruthi L	India	3	0
Victoria McDougall	England	2	0
Kelly Fisher	England	2	2
Sadie Isaacs	England	2	1
Chitra Magimairaj	India	2	2
Vera Seals	England	2	3
Helen Futo	England	2	2
Karen Corr	Northern Ireland	2	0
Anuja Thakur	India	1	0
Marie Keeton	England	1	0
Muriel Hazeldene^{1}	England	1	0
Ruth Harrison	England	1	0
Vera Youle	England	1	1
Revanna Umadevi	India	1	3
Anna Lynch	Australia	1	1
Grace Phillips	England	1	0
Jamie Hunter	England	1	0
Ray Craven	England	0	11
Eva Palmius	Sweden	0	4
Gladys Burton	England	0	2
Ellen Eddowes	England	0	1
Ethel Brown	England	0	1
G M Saunders	England	0	1
Doris Keene	England	0	1
Sally Bartley	England	0	1
Ella Morris	England	0	1
Lynette Horsburgh	Scotland	0	1
Snethra Babu	India	0	1
Rochy Woods	England	0	1
Tina Owen-Sevilton	England	0	1
Caroline Walch	England	0	1
Rebecca Kenna	England	0	1
Judy Dangerfield	Australia	0	1
Keerath Bhandaal	India	0	1
unknown	–	0	3

== IBSF Championship ==
In 2015, the International Billiards and Snooker Federation held its own version of a World Women's Billiards Championship. Arantxa Sanchis defeated Revanna Umadevi to take the title.

IBSF World Women's Billiards Championship final
Year	Organiser	Winner	Runner-up	Final score	Venue	Ref.
2015	IBSF	Arantxa Sanchis (IND)	Revanna Umadevi (IND)	414–255	Oceania Snooker Academy, Adelaide	

== See also ==
- Women's Amateur Snooker Championship
