= British Junior English Billiards Championship =

Billiards competition for players under age 19

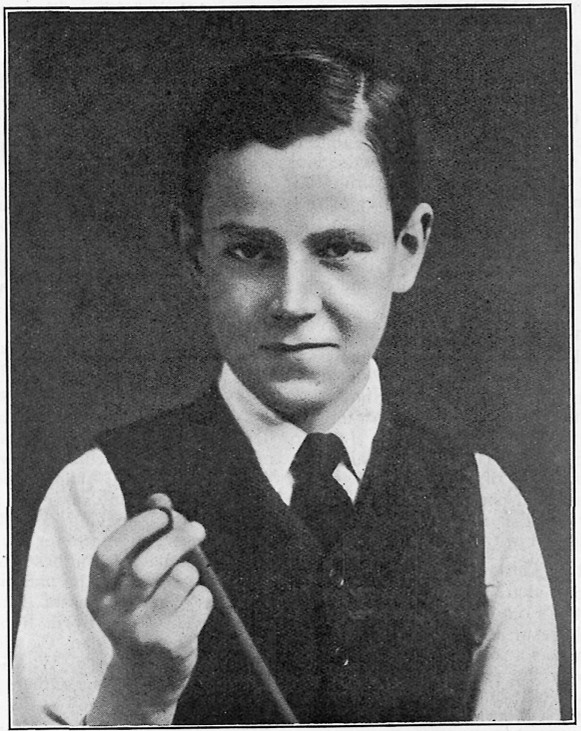
Walter Donaldson won the inaugural championship

The British Junior English Billiards championship is an English billiards competition for players in the UK. There are three divisions, the "Girls" Championship for all female players under 19 years, the "Boys" championship for players under 16, and the "Junior" championship for players under the age of 19. The under-16 competition was organised by the Billiards Association and Control Council from 1922.

There were previous championships for young players. A 1905 article in the Darlington-based newspaper The North Star said that "boy billiard matches appear to be good drawing concerns now" and noted that there was an upcoming round-robin tournament at Burroughes and Watts, London. Tom Newman recalled in a 1938 interview in The Billiard Player, that he won a Boys Championship in 1909 at the age of 15 at Burroughes and Watts.

Rex Williams, Mark Wildman, Mike Russell, Peter Gilchrist, David Causier, and Chris Shutt all won Junior titles before going to win the World Billiards Championship. World Snooker Championship winners to have recorded wins in the Junior Billiards event are Walter Donaldson, Dennis Taylor and Steve Davis. Fred Davis, champion in 1928, went on to win world professional titles in both billiards and snooker.

In 2022, William Thomson of Southampton, Hampshire (9 years old) became the youngest-ever winner of the Under-16 event. In 2026, William Thomson clinched the English Under 16's title to make it five consecutive titles with it being a record since these championships began in 1922

Robin Wilson (Middlesbrough) holds the record for the most wins in the Championship, with 2 wins in the Boys and 5 in the Junior.

The highest Championship breaks recorded in each event are, Hannah Jones (Derby), 43 in the 2011 Girls, Donald Cruikshank (South Shields), 130 in the 1936 Boys and Glen Cromack (Middlesbrough), 150 in the 1989 Junior.

== Under-16 Champions ==
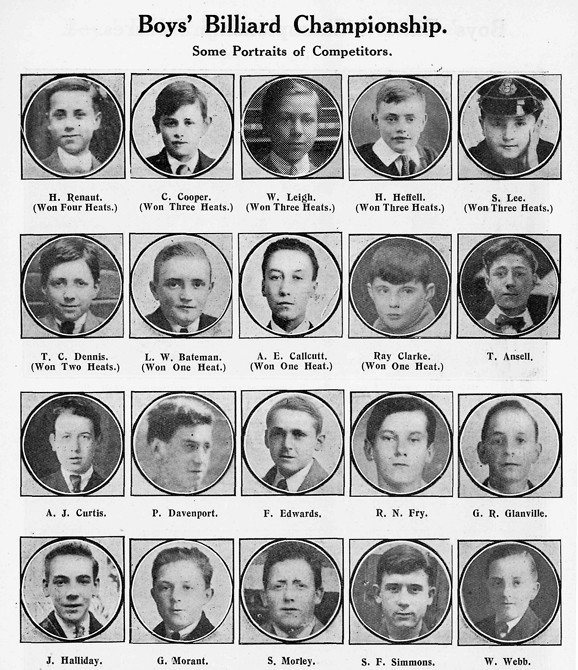
Some of the entrants to the 1922 Boys' Championship, including future champions Willie Leigh (1923, middle of the top row) and Sydney Lee (1925, right of the top row)

Under-16 finals
Year	Winner	Final score	Runner-up	Venue	Ref.
1922 Jun	Walter Donaldson	1000-686	H Renaut		
1923 Apr	Willie Leigh	600–482	Frank Edwards		
1924 Apr	Laurie Steeples	750–330	George Cooper		
1925 Apr	Sydney Lee	750-575	George Cooper	Burroughes Hall, London	
1925 Dec	Reggie Gartland	750–698	Sydney Lee	London	
1926 Dec	Reggie Gartland	750–282	Robert Bennett		
1928 Apr	Robert Bennett	750–559	Jack Forrester		
1928 Dec	Fred Davis	750–529	Harold Bennett		
1929 Dec	Harold Bennett	750–452	W H Dennis		
1931 Jan	Charles Desbottles	750–623	Terence Steeples	Burroughes Hall, London	
1931 Dec	Dennis Hawkes	750–298	Willie Swinhoe	Burroughes Hall, London	
1932 Dec	Jack Wright	750–596	G. Jenkins	Burroughes Hall, London	
1933 Dec	Willie Swinhoe	750–739	Donald Cruikshank		
1934 May	Ronald Ballard	300–239	G Sparks		
1934 Dec	Donald Cruikshank	750–568	Ronald Ballard		
1935 Dec	Donald Cruikshank	750–618	Harry Stokes		
1936	Donald Cruikshank	750–647	Harry Stokes		
1937	Douglas Curson	750–485	Willie Milburn		
1938	No Contest				
1939	Richie Smith	400–307	Alan Walker		
1940	Barrie Smith (Note: Later known as John Barrie)	400–307	Walter Cox		
1941–1946	No Contest				
1947 Dec	Rex Williams	400–349	Jack Carney		
1948 Dec	Rex Williams	400–280	Michael Leydon		
1949 Dec	Marcus Owen	400–152	Michael Leydon		
1950 Dec	Emlyn Parry	400–383	Marcus Owen		
1951 Dec	Markham Wildman	400–355	John Burgess	London	
1953 Jan	Clive Everton	400–197	Jack Lambert		
1954 Jan	Henry Burns	400–300	David Deakes		
1955 Jan	David Deakes	400–331	G Waite		
1955 Dec	Colin Dean	400–360	Alan Gadsden		
1958 Jan	Patrick Morgan	400–260	David Bend		
1959	No Contest				
1960 Jan	Tony Matthews	400–160	R. Tumman		
1960 Dec	Bernard Whitehead	400–205	Keith Richardson		
1961–1967	No Contest				
1968	Christopher Williamson	299–238	David Ross		
1969	Peter Bardsley	398–386	Christopher Boden		
1970	Willie Thorne	310–263	Peter Bardsley		
1971	Peter Bardsley	378–300	Brian Fairall		
1972	Peter Bardsley	365–260	Dennis Rothwell		
1973	Trevor Wells	577–316	Dennis Rothwell		
1974	Peter Allen	340–177	Clint Houlihan		
1975	Steve McNamara	369–306	John Barnes		
1976	David Bonney	291–192	Keith Martin		
1977	David Bonney	263–156	Ged Calvey		
1978	Kevin Walsh	234–142	Danny Adds		
1979	Tony Pyle	200–147	Kevin Walsh		
1980	Kevin Walsh	197–165	Paul Jones		
1981	David Presgrave	197–170	Ian Marks		
1982	Stephen Naisby	307–164	Robert Williamson		
1983	Peter Gilchrist	230–175	Simon Snee		
1984	Chris Rowntree	286–257	Jon Birch		
1985	Mike Russell	464–111	N. Prior		
1986	Lee Connor	290-208	Paul Roulston		
1987	Rod Lawler	342-190	Paul Boden		
1988	Sacha Journett	221–220	Daniel Bewick		
1989	Lee Cuthbert	319–235	David Causier		
1990	Lee Lagan	310-152	D. Lewis		
1991	Michael Westthorp	364-185	Peter Sheehan		
1992	No Contest				
1993	Chris Shutt	501–128	Phil Johnson		
1994	Alan Scott	279–211	Previn Shukle		
1995	Chris Brunskill	274–155	Robin Wilson		
1996	Dean Bavister	213–152	Robin Wilson		
1997	Robin Wilson	313–235	Martin Shutt		
1998	Matthew Sutton	319–196	Robin Wilson		
1999	Robin Wilson	450–175	Allan Taylor		
2000	Peter Gamblin	254–164	Billy Bousfield		
2001	Peter Gamblin	300–163	Danny Beagrie		
2002	Michael Donnelly	406–226	Daniel Dobbs		
2003	Jamie Edwards	253–181	Callum Robinson		
2004	Dominic Mulhall	289–199	Ross McDonald		
2005	Darren Cook	315–277	Ricky Easter		
2006	Darren Cook	435–325	James Halpin		
2007	James Halpin	351–331	Ryan Clark		
2008	Ryan Clark	690–224	Michael Williams		
2009	Aaron Hatton	313–226	Ben Wanley		
2010	Johnathon Snee	261-107	Ryan Jackson	Newark Cue Club	
2011	Luke Christian	226-141	Adam Stewart	Newark Cue Club	
2012	Sam Betts	200–181	Adam Stewart		
2013	James Eyre	196-151	Jack Easter		
2014	Jack Easter	183-136	Callum Lawlor		
2015	Reggie Edwards	232- 97	Jack Easter		
2016	Nathan Boughen	130–88	Merlin Knight		
2017	Finley Brown	162–107	Callum Wilson-West		
2018	Callum Wilson-West	177-141	Finley Brown	Maltings Q Club, King's Lynn	
2019	Finley Brown	247–107	William Chambers	Maltings Q Club, King's Lynn	
2020	No Contest				
2021	Harry Grimmett	208–156	Danny Overson	Maltings Q Club, King's Lynn	
2022	William Thomson	200–174	Danny Overson	Maltings Q Club, King's Lynn	
2023	William Thomson	279–113	Charlie Sutton	Maltings Q Club, King's Lynn	
2024	William Thomson	191-127	William Chambers		
2025	William Thomson	262-235	Asten Sahota	Maltings Q Club, King's Lynn	

== Under-19 Champions ==
Under-19 finals
Year	Winner	Final score	Runner-up	Venue	Ref.
1949	George Toner	500–298	Ron Gross		
1950	Rex Williams	747–322	Jack Carney		
1951	Rex Williams	751–270	Jack Carney		
1952	John Sinclair	442–363	Brian Simpson		
1953	Mark Wildman	529–520	Emlyn Parry		
1954	Mark Wildman	582–497	Donald Scott		
1955	Donald Scott	538–360	Clive Everton		
1956	Clive Everton	429–277	Granville Hampson		
1957	Colin Myers	381–306	Colin Dean		
1958	Christopher Marks	414–351	Colin Dean		
1959	Paddy Morgan	446–321	Peter Shelley		
1960	David Bend	468–408	Colin Davies		
1961	Paddy Morgan	538–357	Tony Matthews		
1962	Tony Matthews	485–395	Dennis Rhodes		
1963	Tony Matthews	572–323	Michael McCann		
1964–67	No Contest				
1968	Dennis Taylor	684–536	Dave Burgess		
1969	Dave Burgess	501–436	John Terry		
1970	John Terry	606–287	William Blake		
1971	Willie Thorne	728–321	Russell Toombes		
1972	Willie Thorne	497–240	Clive Palmer		
1973	Willie Thorne	598–566	Peter Edworthy		
1974	Trevor Wells	414–285	Denis Rothwell		
1975	Eugene Hughes	440–325	Ian Williamson		
1976	Steve Davis	435–259	Ian Williamson		
1977	Ian Williamson	289–133	John Barnes		
1978	Ian Williamson	328–105	John Barnes		
1979	Mick Garvey	237–192	Paul McGowan		
1980	Geoff Charville	216–187	Martin Goodwill		
1981	Shaun Hawkins	264–166	Mark Heller		
1982	Robert Marshall	296–239	Kevin Walsh		
1983	Stephen Naisby	328–228	Stephen Walker		
1984	Stephen Naisby	308–181	Simon Snee		
1985	Stephen Naisby	306–181	Peter Gilchrist		
1986	Mike Russell	428-279	Dave Finbow		
1987	Mike Russell	395-166	Peter Gilchrist		
1988	Mike Stocks	218–203	Nick Hayward		
1989	Glen Cromack	304–202	Michael Leach		
1990	Mike Dunn	363-131	Shaun Golightly		
1991	David Causier	320-285	Lee Lagan		
1993	Michael Westthorpe	417–276	Peter Sheehan		
1994	Lee Lagan	317–225	Michael Westthorpe		
1995	Chris Shutt	417–188	Chris Brunskill		
1996	Chris Shutt	503–208	Chris Brunskill		
1997	Robin Wilson	359–244	Matt Willard		
1998	Robin Wilson	343–223	Matthew Sutton		
1999	Matthew Sutton	293–129	Jimmy Chambers		
2000	Robin Wilson	399–188	Martin Shutt		
2001	Robin Wilson	354–193	Jimmy Chambers		
2002	Robin Wilson	456–158	Peter Gamblin		
2003	Dominic Mulhall	270–210	Jamie Edwards		
2004	Billy Bousfield	399–220	Michael Donnelly		
2005	Dominic Mulhall	353–320	Jamie Edwards		
2006	Dominic Mulhall	666–281	Darren Cook		
2007	Dominic Mulhall	588–361	Steven Kerr		
2008	Ryan Clark	503–264	Bruce Welham		
2009	Darren Cook	464–323	Johnathon Buglass		
2010	Aaron Hatton	230-182	Finley Lang		
2011	Aaron Hatton	211-204	Jonathan Snee		
2012	Aaron Hatton	261–158	Jonathan Snee		
2013	George Pragnall	386-221	Sam Betts		
2014	Mathew Lyon	276-131	Ryan Jackson		
2015	Mathew Lyon	313-163	Jack Easter		
2016	Jack Easter	238–120	Nathan Boughen		
2017	Harry Cobbold	167–110	Nathan Boughen		
2018	Nathan Boughen	150-139	Harley Dyson	Maltings Q Club, King's Lynn	
2019	Nathan Boughen	205-158	Harley Dyson		
2020	No Contest				
2021	Finley Brown	230-165	Alec Chalmers	Maltings Q Club, King's Lynn	
2022	Harry Grimmett	242-123	Matthew Boughen	Maltings Q Club, King's Lynn	
2023	Ethan Llewellyn	193-183	Riley Ellis		
2024	William Chambers	157-138	Casey Turner		
2025	William Chambers	254-173	Casey Turner	Maltings Q Club, King's Lynn	

== Girls ==
The Girls' championship was first held in 1933. The age limit was 16 for the 1933 event, but was raised to 18 the following year. The competition was revived in 1950 after a break of more than ten years, this time with an age limit of 17.

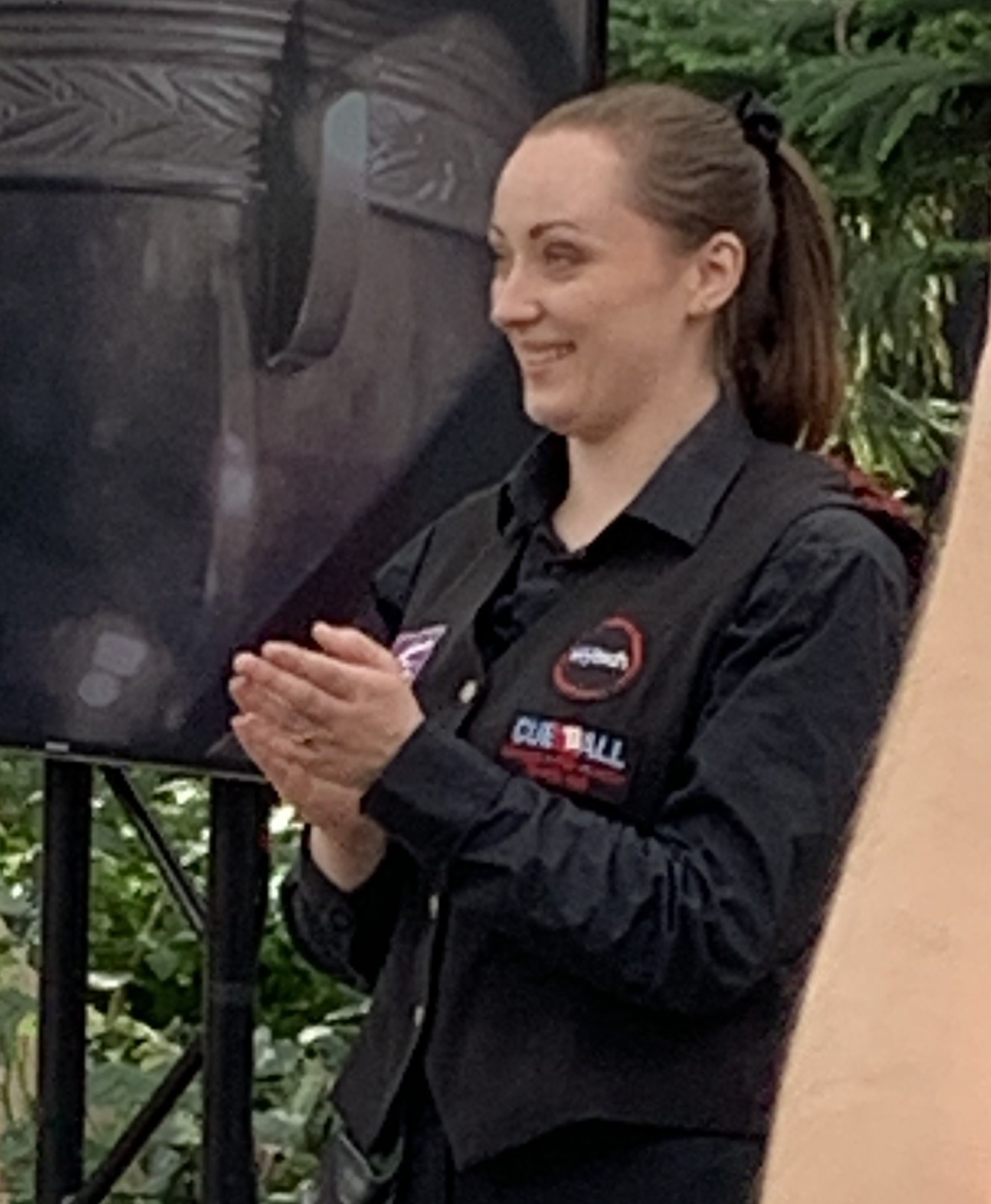
Hannah Jones (pictured in 2024) won the title four times.

Girls' finals
Year	Winner	Final score	Runner-up	Venue	Ref.
1933	Helen McDougall	200-182	Nancy Fenn		
1934	Helen McDougall	200-195	Jessie Banks		
1935	Jessie Banks	200-196	Helen McDougall		
1951	Maureen Barrett	195-83	Clare Hackett		
1952	Maureen Barrett	uncontested			
1953	Maureen Barrett	uncontested			
2009	Danielle Maud	bt	Bethanie Duke		
2010	Hannah Jones	191-114	Rochy Woods		
2011	Hannah Jones	235-112	Jazmin Cainey		
2012	Hannah Jones	bt	Josie Wright		
2013	Hannah Jones	bt	Rochy Woods		
2014	Rochy Woods	bt	Josie Wright		
2015	Rochy Woods	173-30	Hannah Greeno		
2016	Rochy Woods	175–56	Hannah Greeno		
2017	Rochy Woods	152–48	Brittany Chambers		
2018	Hannah Greeno	109-104	Brittany Chambers	Maltings Q Club, King's Lynn	
2019	Hannah Greeno	83-74	Lexie Greeno	Maltings Q Club, King's Lynn	
2021	Lexie Greeno	77-34	Bella Hemsley	Maltings Q Club, King's Lynn	
2022	Bella Stowell	67-33	Ruby Jeffries	Maltings Q Club, King's Lynn	
2023	Lexie Greeno	92-29	Bridie Callaby		
2024	Bridie Callaby	uncontested			
