= Anuja Chandra-Thakur =

Indian snooker player (born 1983)

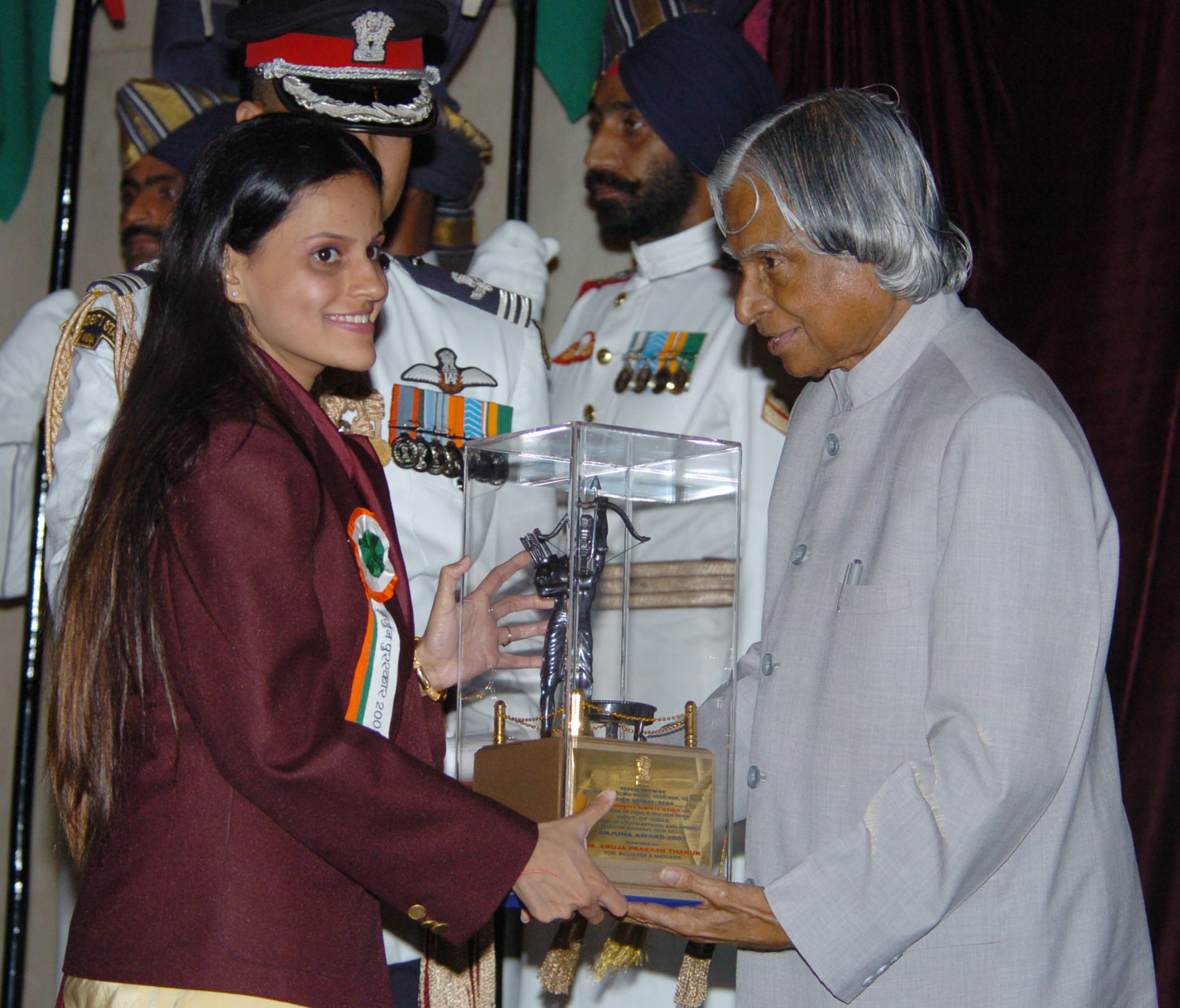
- Thakur (left) receiving the Arjuna Award in 2005

Personal information
- Born: 1983 (age 42–43) India

Sport
- Country: India
- Sport: Snooker

- World Women's Billiards Champion: 2005

Anuja Chandra-Thakur (born 1983) is an Indian amateur player of snooker and English billiards.

She won the WLBSA Ladies World Billiards Championship title in April 2005, in a 243–136 victory over Lynette Horsburgh of Scotland, and reached the semi-final at the 2006 IBSF World Snooker Championship in Amman, Jordan, where she was eliminated by Jaique Ip 4–2.

== Biography ==
Thakur is a native of Mumbai, Maharashtra. She has won several state and national championships in both snooker and billiards. Her sister, Meenal Thakur, is also a player in both disciplines. Anuja is married to Manan Chandra, another Indian amateur billiards player.

== Titles and achievements ==
Snooker

Outcome	No.	Year	Championship	Opponent	Score	Ref.
Semi-finalist	1	2006	IBSF World Snooker Championship	Jaique Ip	4–2	

English billiards

Outcome	No.	Year	Championship	Opponent	Score	Ref.
Winner	1	2005	World Ladies Billiards Championship	Lynette Horsburgh	243–136	
