= Anupama Ramachandran =

Indian snooker player (born 2002)

Personal information
- Born: 19 May 2002 (age 24)

Sport
- Country: India
- Sport: Snooker
- Highest ranking: World Women's Snooker: 6

Anupama Ramachandran (born 19 May 2002) is an Indian snooker and English billiards player. She won the women's International Billiards and Snooker Federation World Snooker Championship in 2025 with a 3–2 victory against Ng On-yee, becoming the first Indian woman to win the championship. She retained the title in 2026, with a 3-1 defeat of So Man Yan. Her other international titles include the 2023 Women's Snooker World Cup, won with Amee Kamani, the 2023 World Women's Under-21 Snooker Championship and the 2024 Asian Women's Snooker championship.

Anupama won the Girls' World Open Under-16 Snooker Championship in 2017 and was runner-up at the women's IBSF World Under-21 Snooker Championship in 2022 and 2023. On the World Women's Snooker (WWS) tour, she reached her first ranking final at the US Women's Open in 2024 and attained a career-high ranking of sixth in March 2025. She has also won Indian national titles in snooker and English billiards. Based in Chennai, she has competed while also undertaking postgraduate study.

== Early life and education ==
Anupama Ramachandran was born on 19 May 2002 and is from Chennai, Tamil Nadu. She attended Vidya Mandir Senior Secondary School and was introduced to cue sports at a summer coaching camp at the Mylapore Club. After finishing runner-up in a state under-18 snooker event in 2015, she began taking the sport more seriously. Her family installed a snooker table at home in 2016, enabling her to practise outside the club. Her father left his real-estate business to support her sporting career.

She studied for a Master of Commerce at M.O.P. Vaishnav College for Women. Her school and college accommodated her tournament commitments alongside her studies. By November 2025, she was pursuing a second postgraduate degree, in public policy, at the same college.

== Career ==
=== 2015–2022: Early career ===
Anupama competed in state and national events before making her IBSF debut in Belgium in 2016, where she reached the quarter-finals of the under-18 competition. In October 2017, she won the inaugural girls' World Open Under-16 Snooker Championship in Saint Petersburg, defeating Keerthana Pandian 3–1 in the final. From 2016 to 2017, she won multiple Tamil Nadu state titles in snooker and billiards across the under-18, under-21 and senior women's categories, and the 2017 National Girls Under-18 Snooker Championship.

In December 2021, Anupama finished runner-up to Kamani at the senior Indian Snooker Championship, losing the final 1–3. She reached the women's IBSF World Under-21 final in Bucharest in August 2022, where she lost 1–4 to Panchaya Channoi.

=== 2023–2024: International titles and WWS tour ===
Anupama made her WWS tour debut at the 2023 Women's Snooker World Cup in Bangkok. Representing India A alongside Kamani, she won the team title with a 4–3 victory over England A's Reanne Evans and Rebecca Kenna in the final. The Indian pair had also defeated Thailand C and Thailand A in deciding frames during the knockout stages. She later said that the experience encouraged her to compete regularly in WWS ranking events.

At the 2023 World Women's Snooker Championship, Anupama reached the last 16 of the main event. She also won the accompanying World Women's Under-21 Championship, beating two-time defending champion Ploychompoo Laokiatphong 3–2 in the final after trailing 1–2. In July, she finished runner-up at the separate IBSF World Under-21 Championship in Riyadh, losing 2–3 to Pandian.

In November 2023, Anupama reached the final of the IBSF women's Six-red snooker World Championship in Doha, where Vidya Pillai defeated her 4–1. Anupama was a flag bearer for the Tamil Nadu team at the opening ceremony of the 2023 National Games in Goa.

Ahead of the December 2023 Indian national championships in Chennai, she said that she would compete only in the senior categories. At the championships, she lost both snooker finals to Kamani, including a 1–4 defeat in the 15-red event. She then won her first senior national title in English billiards, recovering from two games down to beat Kamani 3–2 in the final.

Anupama won the Asian women's Snooker Championship in Riyadh in July 2024. She defeated Pandian 3–0 in the semi-finals and Channoi 3–1 in the final. The following month, she reached her first WWS ranking final at the US Women's Open in Seattle. She beat defending champion Mink Nutcharut in the quarter-finals and Kenna in the semi-finals before losing 0–4 to Ng On-yee. In September, she was runner-up at the inaugural Mongolia World Cup of Women's Snooker, losing 0–3 to Ng.

=== 2025–present: World champion ===
Anupama won the women's snooker title at the 2024–25 Indian National Championships, beating Kamani in the final. She reached a career-high WWS ranking of sixth in March 2025.

She reached the quarter-finals of the WWS World Championship in both 2024 and 2025. In September 2025, she was runner-up to Pandian at the Indian Six-red Snooker Championship in Dehradun, losing the final 3–4.

In November 2025, Anupama won the women's IBSF World Snooker Championship in Doha, becoming the first Indian woman to win the title. She defeated Keerthana Pandian 3–1 in the semi-finals before beating Ng On-yee 3–2 in the final. Ng took the first frame in the final, and after Anupama had levelled the match, moved into the lead again by winning frame three 71–10. A break of 29 by Anupama contributed to her winning the fourth frame to force a decider. In the deciding frame, Anupama was leading 61–42 but after her attempt at a safety shot on the final green ball, Ng cleared the colours from green to pink to leave her a single point behind at 60–61. Ng missed an attempt to pot the final black; Anupama then, taking a little longer on her shot than she normally does, potted the black to secure victory.

At the Indian national championships in January 2026, Anupama lost the women's snooker final 1–3 to Kamani. The following day, she defeated Kamani 197–112 in the women's billiards final.

At The Hindu World of Women Awards 2026, she received the Excellence in Sports Award. In September 2026, she reached the semi-finals of the UK Women's Snooker Championship, recovering from 0–2 down to beat Channoi in the quarter-finals before losing to Bai Yulu, the eventual champion. She reached the final of the billiards event at the 2026 Commonwealth Cue Sports Championships, beating Chimba Chimfwembe and Mhairi Roberta Mackay, to face Revanna Umadevi and won the final 213–159.

At the 2026 women's IBSF World Snooker Championship, she defeated Pandian in the quarter-finals and Tessa Davidson in the semi-finals. In the final against So Man Yan, Anupama lost the first frame but then won the next three to retain the title.

== Training and playing approach ==
Anupama's early coach was N. Suryanarayanan. She began working with former Indian player S. A. Saleem in 2018. During the COVID-19 pandemic, she practised at home while Saleem coached her through video calls. Having initially trained at the Mylapore Club, she later moved to the Madras Cricket Club. In 2023, she began training abroad with Nigel Bond. In preparation for the 2026 Commonwealth English Billiards Championship, she was being coached by Yasin Merchant, particularly about her cueing technique and timing.

In 2018, Anupama practised for about three hours daily, with the table at home allowing her to avoid travelling to a club. In preparation for the 2023 World Championships, she practised at home and at the Tamil Nadu Billiards and Snooker Association. She said that frequent tournament play, including the National Games, had helped her preparation.

In a 2024 WWS interview, Anupama described concentrating on each shot in turn as a strength of her game, and named Mark Selby and Judd Trump as her favourite players. After her 2025 world title, she credited earlier Indian women players as an inspiration and described snooker as requiring both patience and aggression. In 2026, she said that billiards required different skills and a different approach from snooker. Similarly, having played in heyball competitions for around 18 months, she felt that her experience of snooker helped with potting, but the tactics and thought process were distinct.

Speaking to Madras Musings in 2026, she linked increasing participation by girls to the Tamil Nadu government's recognition of cue sports. She also highlighted the opportunities sporting achievements could provide for college admissions, scholarships and government employment. In another interview that year, she advocated more league competitions to raise awareness of snooker and billiards.

Anupama is listed among the athletes supported under the Tamil Nadu government's Mission International Medals Scheme. Her career-high break of 119 was a record for an Indian woman as at March 2026.

== Career finals ==
=== Snooker ===
World Women's Snooker ranking events

WWS ranking finals
Outcome	Year	Championship	Opponent in the final	Score	Ref.
Runner-up	2024	US Women's Snooker Open	Ng On-yee	0–4	

Other international events

Other international individual finals
Outcome	Year	Championship	Opponent in the final	Score	Ref.
Winner	2017	Girls' World Open Under-16 Championship (IBSF)	Keerthana Pandian	3–1	
Runner-up	2022	Women's IBSF World Under-21 Snooker Championship	Panchaya Channoi	1–4	
Winner	2023	World Women's Under-21 Championship (WWS)	Ploychompoo Laokiatphong	3–2	
Runner-up	2023	Women's IBSF World Under-21 Championship	Keerthana Pandian	2–3	
Runner-up	2023	IBSF women's Six-red World Championship	Vidya Pillai	1–4	
Winner	2024	Asian Women's Championship	Panchaya Channoi	3–1	
Runner-up	2024	Mongolia World Cup of Women's Snooker (individual)	Ng On-yee	0–3	
Winner	2025	Women's IBSF World Snooker Championship	Ng On-yee	3–2	
Winner	2026	Women's IBSF World Snooker Championship	So Man Yan	3–1	

Indian national championships

Indian national snooker finals
Outcome	Year	Championship	Opponent in the final	Score	Ref.
Runner-up	2021	Indian Women's Snooker Championship	Amee Kamani	1–3	
Runner-up	2023	Indian Women's Snooker Championship	Amee Kamani	1–4	
Runner-up	2025	Indian women's Six-red Snooker Championship	Keerthana Pandian	3–4	
Winner	2025	Indian women's Snooker Championship	Amee Kamani	unknown	
Runner-up	2026	Indian Women's Snooker Championship	Amee Kamani	1–3	

Team finals
Outcome	Year	Championship	Team and partner	Opponents in the final	Score	Ref.
Winner	2023	Women's Snooker World Cup (WWS)	India A (with Amee Kamani)	England A (Reanne Evans and Rebecca Kenna)	4–3	

=== English billiards ===
Selected Indian national billiards finals
Outcome	Year	Championship	Opponent in the final	Score	Ref.
Winner	2023	Indian Women's Billiards Championship	Amee Kamani	3–2 (100-up games)	
Winner	2026	Indian Women's Billiards Championship	Amee Kamani	197–112 (points)	

International billiards finals
Outcome	Year	Championship	Opponent in the final	Score	Ref.
Winner	2026	Commonwealth English Billiards Championship	Revanna Umadevi	213–159 (points)	

=== State titles and junior national titles ===
Results of finals:

- 2017 National Girls U18 Snooker Championship – Winner
- 2017 National Girls U18 Billiards Championship – runner-up
- 2017 Tamil Nadu State Women Billiards Championship – Winner
- 2017 Tamil Nadu State Women Snooker Championship – Winner
- 2017 Tamil Nadu State Girls U21 Billiards Championship – Winner
- 2017 Tamil Nadu State Girls U21 Snooker Championship – Winner
- 2017 Tamil Nadu State Girls U18 Billiards Championship – Winner
- 2017 Tamil Nadu State Girls U18 Snooker Championship – Winner
- 2016 Tamil Nadu State Girls U21 Billiards Championship – Winner
- 2016 Tamil Nadu State Girls U21 Snooker Championship – Winner
- 2016 Tamil Nadu State Girls U18 Billiards Championship – Winner
- 2016 Tamil Nadu State Girls U18 Snooker Championship – Winner
- 2015 Tamil Nadu State Girls U18 Snooker Championship – runner-up
