= Rochelle Woods (billiards player) =

Player of English Billiards from England

- Born: 1999 (age 26–27)
- Sport country: England
- Nickname: Rochy Woods
- Best ranking finish: Runner up 2015 World Women's Billiards Championship

Rochelle Woods (born 1999), also known as Rochy Woods, is an English player of English billiards. She was runner-up in the 2015 World Women's Billiards Championship.

== Early life ==
Woods took her GCSEs at Litcham School before going to study for a BTEC award in sports coaching. She has a twin sister, Tiffany, and prefers to be known as Rochy rather than Rochelle.

Woods started playing billiards at the age of 10, having been introduced to the sport by her coach Phillip Welham at a taster day. She entered the English Under 16 Billiards Championship in 2013 and lost to the eventual champion James Eyre by 10 points.

== Career ==
In 2010, Woods entered the English Girls Billiards Championship for the first time at 11 years old, and lost in the final to Hannah Jones of Derby. Jones also defeated Woods in the final in 2013. Woods won her first National Girls Championship defeating Josie Wright (Thetford) 115–98 in the 2014 final.

In 2015, Woods beat Hannah Greeno (Narborough) to win the English Girls' Billiards event, and later in the year qualified from the round-robin stage for the final of the World Women's Billiards Championship, held at the Northern Snooker Centre, Leeds. Emma Bonney won the title for the tenth time, defeating Woods 334–119 in the final at the Northern Snooker Centre, Leeds

Woods won the 2016 English Girls' Billiards title by beating Greeno in the final again. She was also a semi-finalist in the National Junior (under 19s) championship, but lost 108–113 to Nathan Boughren. At the 2016 World Women's Billiards Championship, Woods lost all four of her matches, to Bonney, Revanna Umadevi, Gaye Jones and Eva Palmius.

The following year, aged 18 in 2017, Woods gained her fourth national title after defeating Brittany Chambers 152–48 in the final, and was also a semi-finalist in the National Junior (under 19s) Billiards championship again, but lost. At the 2017 Women's World Championship, she failed to qualify despite recording a 178–166 win over eventual champion Emma Bonney.

In March 2020, Woods won the first ever Norfolk Women's Billiards Championship, defeating Jazmin Cainey (Narborough) in the final and the Norfolk Women's Snooker Championship, defeating Emma Powers-Richardson (Norwich) in the final. In October, Woods won the Eastern Counties Women's Billiards Championship defeating Cambridgeshire's Brittany Chambers and was runner-up in the Eastern Counties Women's Snooker Championship, losing to Lauren Macnamee (Ipswich).

Woods was believed to be the youngest ever qualified WPBSA World snooker coach when she qualified in 2015 at the age of 16. In 2017, she established her own Junior Coaching Academy based at the Maltings Q Club, King's Lynn. Since then, she has coached over 50 players at the Junior Academy in both English Billiards and Snooker.

Woods was also made lead coach for the Narbeck Boys Billiards League in 2020. She also works with the Norfolk Billiards and Snooker Association helping to introduce their Development structure to West Norfolk.

== Notable achievements ==
Outcome	No.	Year	Championship	Opponent	Score	Ref.
Runner-up	1	2015	World Ladies Billiards Championship	Emma Bonney	119–334	
Winner	2	2015	English Girls' Billiards Champion	Hannah Greeno	173-30	
Winner	3	2016	English Girls' Billiards Champion	Hannah Greeno	175-56	
Winner	4	2017	English Girls' Billiards Champion	Brittany Chambers	152-48	
