= IBSF =

IBSF may refer to:

- International Billiards and Snooker Federation
- International Bobsleigh and Skeleton Federation
