= Rebecca Kenna =

English Snooker and billiards player

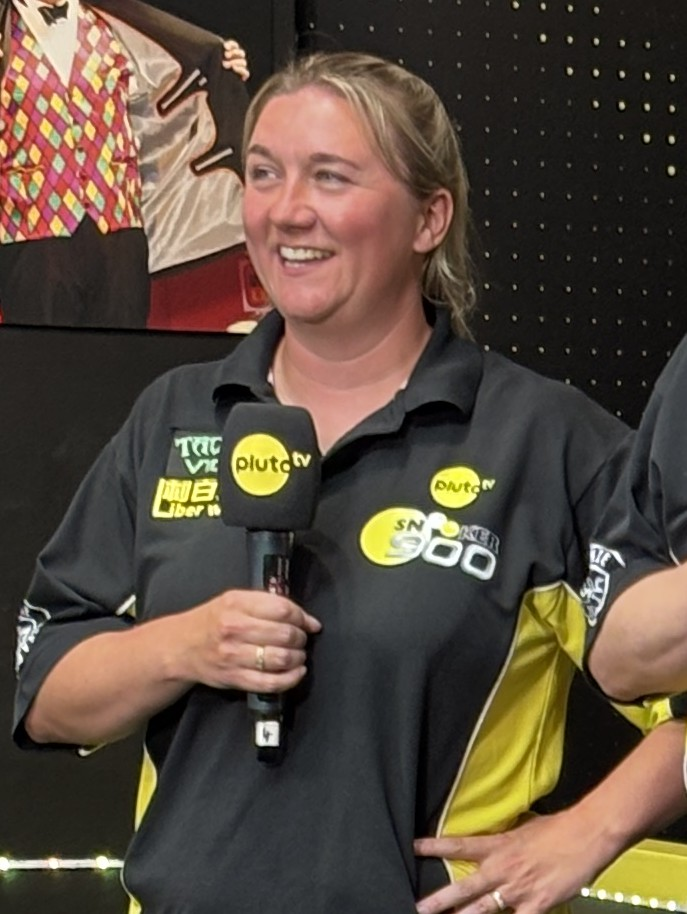
- Kenna in 2026

Personal information
- Born: 11 January 1989 (age 37)

Sport
- Country: England
- Sport: Snooker
- Professional: 2022–2024
- Highest ranking: World Women's Snooker: 3

Rebecca Kenna (née Granger; born 11 January 1989) is an English former professional snooker player from Keighley. She defeated Anna Prysazhnuka 4–1 in the final to win the 2024 Women's EBSA European Snooker Championship. She was runner-up in the 2018 World Ladies Billiards Championship. Kenna earned a tour card for the professional World Snooker Tour from 2022 to 2024.

== Biography ==
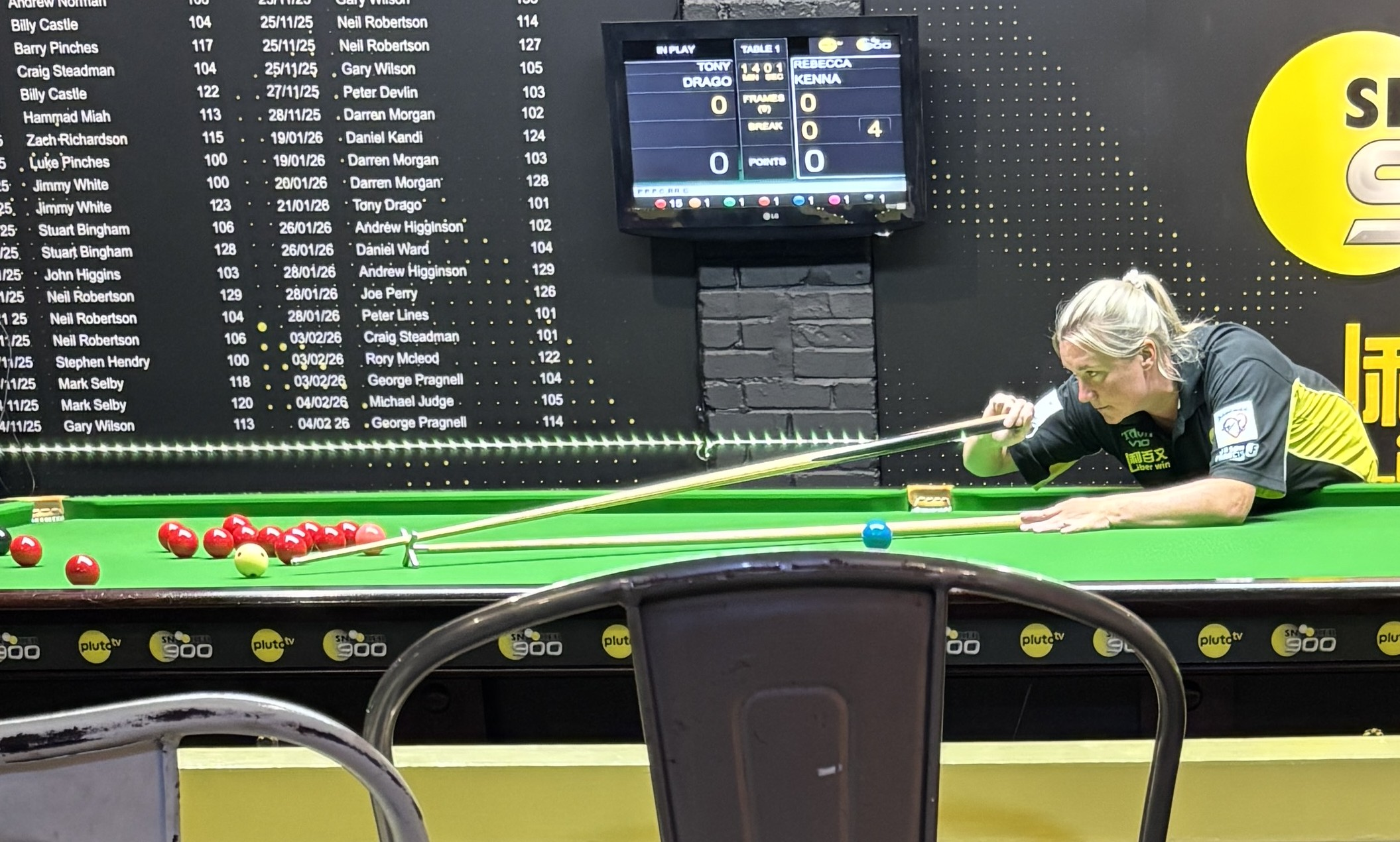
Kenna playing at a Snooker 900 tournament in 2026

Kenna started playing on the women's snooker circuit in 2016, and reached the semi-finals of the world championship at her first attempt. She ended her first full season ranked sixth, having reached the semi-finals of the world championship again, and recorded a victory over multiple world championship title holder Reanne Evans in the course of reaching the final of the 2017 Connie Gough Trophy.

In 2018, at her first billiards tournament, she reached the final of the World Women's Billiards Championship, losing 209–329 to Emma Bonney. This was Bonney's sixth consecutive world championship win, and her thirteenth overall.

Kenna was one of four players selected to take part in the Women's Tour Championship 2019, to be held at the Crucible Theatre in August 2019, the first women's matches to take place at the iconic snooker venue for 16 years.

She is co-owner of Cue Sports Yorkshire, which sells cues and accessories. She also works as a snooker coach, holding a Level 2 certificate in snooker coaching.

From the start of the 2022/23 snooker season, Kenna earnt a place on the professional snooker tour for two years, after finishing fourth in the women's rankings.

At the 2024 Women's EBSA European Snooker Championship, Kenna eliminated Ewelina Piślewska, Wendy Jans, and Diana Stateczny to reach the final, where she achieved a 4–1 victory against reigning champion Anna Prysazhnuka to take the title. Partnering Tessa Davidson, she also won the European Women's Team title.

In 2025 she lost the individual EBSA title to Prysazhnuka, who defeated her 4-3 in the final.

== Personal life ==
Kenna was born Rebecca Granger. She is married to Ashley Kenna, who co-owns Cue Sports Yorkshire with her. She also works as a snooker coach, holding a Level 2 certificate in snooker coaching.

== Performance and rankings timeline ==
=== World Snooker Tour ===
Tournament	2020/ 21	2021/ 22	2022/ 23	2023/ 24
Ranking (Note: It shows the ranking at the beginning of the season.)	(Note: She was an amateur)		(Note: New players on the Main Tour don't have a ranking)	98
Ranking tournaments
Championship League	A	A	A	RR
European Masters	A	A	LQ	LQ
British Open	NH	A	LQ	LQ
English Open	A	A	LQ	LQ
Wuhan Open	Not Held			LQ
Northern Ireland Open	A	A	LQ	LQ
International Championship	Not Held			LQ
UK Championship	A	A	LQ	LQ
Shoot Out	1R	1R	1R	1R
Scottish Open	A	A	LQ	LQ
World Grand Prix	DNQ	DNQ	DNQ	DNQ
German Masters	A	A	LQ	LQ
Welsh Open	A	A	LQ	LQ
Players Championship	DNQ	DNQ	DNQ	DNQ
World Open	Not Held			LQ
Tour Championship	DNQ	DNQ	DNQ	DNQ
World Championship	LQ	LQ	LQ	LQ
Former ranking tournaments
WST Classic	Not Held		1R	NH
Former non-ranking tournaments
Six-red World Championship	Not Held		LQ	NH

Performance Table Legend
LQ	lost in the qualifying draw	#R	lost in the early rounds of the tournament (WR = Wildcard round, RR = Round robin)	QF	lost in the quarter-finals
SF	lost in the semi-finals	F	lost in the final	W	won the tournament
DNQ	did not qualify for the tournament	A	did not participate in the tournament	WD	withdrew from the tournament

NH / Not Held	means an event was not held.
NR / Non-Ranking Event	means an event is/was no longer a ranking event.
R / Ranking Event	means an event is/was a ranking event.
MR / Minor-Ranking Event	means an event is/was a minor-ranking event.

=== World Women's Snooker ===
Tournament	2015/ 16	2016/ 17	2017/ 18	2018/ 19	2019/ 20	2021/ 22	2022/ 23	2023/ 24	2024/ 25
Current tournaments
UK Championship	A	QF	QF	F	QF	F	SF	QF	SF
US Open	Tournament Not Held						F	SF	SF
Australian Open	Not Held			A	A	NH	A	A	A
Scottish Open	Tournament Not Held						SF	Not Held	
Masters	A	1R	SF	F	1R	SF	SF	SF	QF
WSF Women's Championship	Not Held								SF
Belgian Open	Not Held			QF	QF	NH	SF	QF	QF
Asia-Pacific Championship	Tournament Not Held						A	NH	
World Championship	SF	SF	SF	QF	NH	SF	QF	2R	
British Open	A	NH	SF	Not Held		SF	SF	SF	
Former tournaments
Eden Classic	QF	Tournament Not Held							
Connie Gough Trophy	A	F	Tournament Not Held						
Paul Hunter Classic	NH	RR	SF	Tournament Not Held					
European Masters	Not Held			SF	Not Held				
10-Red World Championship	Not Held		QF	QF	QF	Not Held			
6-Red World Championship	Not Held		SF	2R	SF	Not Held			
Tour Championship	Tournament Not Held				SF	Not Held			
Winchester Open	Tournament Not Held					QF	NH		

Performance Table Legend
LQ	lost in the qualifying draw	#R	lost in the early rounds of the tournament (WR = Wildcard round, RR = Round robin)	QF	lost in the quarter-finals
SF	lost in the semi-finals	F	lost in the final	W	won the tournament
DNQ	did not qualify for the tournament	A	did not participate in the tournament	WD	withdrew from the tournament

NH / Not Held	means an event was not held.
NR / Non-Ranking Event	means an event is/was no longer a ranking event.
R / Ranking Event	means an event is/was a ranking event.
MR / Minor-Ranking Event	means an event is/was a minor-ranking event.

== Career finals ==
=== Women's snooker finals ===
Outcome	No.	Year	Championship	Opponent in the final	Score	Ref.
Runner-up	1	2017	Connie Gough Trophy	Maria Catalano (ENG)	2–4	
Runner-up	2	2018	LITEtask UK Women's Championship	Ng On-yee (HKG)	1–4	
Runner-up	3	2018	Eden Women's Masters	Reanne Evans (ENG)	0–4	
Winner	1	2018	Yorkshire Ladies Snooker Championship	Shannon Metcalf (ENG)	2–0	
Winner	2	2019	Hong Kong Women’s Masters	Bai Yulu (CHN)	4–1	
Winner	3	2019	Yorkshire Ladies Snooker Championship	Shannon Metcalf (ENG)	3–0	
Runner-up	4	2020	EPSB English Women's Snooker Championship	Emma Parker (ENG)	0–2	
Winner	4	2022	EPSB English Women's Snooker Championship	Jamie Hunter (ENG)	4–3	
Runner-up	5	2022	US Women's Open	Jamie Hunter (ENG)	1–4	
Winner	5	2024	EPSB English Women's Snooker Championship	Tessa Davidson (ENG)	3–2	
Winner	6	2024	2024/2025 English Women's Tour Event 1	Ellise Scott (ENG)	2–0	
Winner	7	2024	EBSA European Snooker Championship	Anna Prysazhnuka (LAT)	4–1	
Winner	8	2025	EPSB English Women's Snooker Championship	Ellise Scott (ENG)	3–0	
Winner	9	2025	Commonwealth Women's Snooker Championship	Chau Audrey (SIN)	2–0	
Runner-up	6	2025	EBSA European Snooker Championship	Anna Prysazhnuka (LAT)	3–4	

=== Team snooker finals ===
Outcome	No.	Year	Championship	Team/partner	Opponent in the final	Score	Ref.
Runner-up	1	2017	WWS World Mixed Doubles Championship	(England) Dylan Mitchell	(England) Sanderson Lam (Hong Kong) Katrina Wan	1–3	
Runner-up	2	2022	World Mixed Doubles	(England) Mark Selby	(Australia) Neil Robertson (Thailand) Nutcharut Wongharuthai	2–4	
Runner-up	3	2023	WWS Snooker World Cup	(England) Reanne Evans	(India) Amee Kamani (India) Anupama Ramachandran	3–4	
Runner-up	4	2024	World Mixed Doubles (2)	(England) Mark Selby	(Belgium) Luca Brecel (England) Reanne Evans	2–4	
Winner	1	2024	EBSA Women's Team	(England) Tessa Davidson	(Portugal) Vania Franco (Portugal) Sarah Rocha	3–2	
Winner	2	2025	EBSA Women's Team	(England) Ellise Scott	(France) Deu Va (France) Rachell Enfroy	3–2	

=== Billiards finals: 1 ===
Outcome	No.	Year	Championship	Opponent in the final	Score	Ref.
Runner-up	1	2018	World Ladies Billiards Championship	(England) Emma Bonney	209–329	
