= 2022 World Women's Snooker Championship =

Women's snooker championship, held February 2022

Tournament information
- Dates: 11–14 February 2022
- Venue: Ding Junhui Snooker Academy
- City: Sheffield
- Country: England
- Organisation: World Women's Snooker
- Format: Round Robin for qualifying groups, Single elimination
- Total prize fund: £17,200
- Winner's share: £6,000
- Highest break: Ng On Yee (HKG) (97)

Final
- Champion: Nutcharut Wongharuthai (THA)
- Runner-up: Wendy Jans (BEL)
- Score: 6–5

The 2022 World Women's Snooker Championship was a women's snooker tournament that took place at the Ding Junhui Snooker Academy in Sheffield, England from 11 to 14 February 2022. It was the first staging of the World Women's Snooker Championship since 2019, following an 18-month suspension of the World Women's Snooker Tour between March 2020 and August 2021, due to the COVID-19 pandemic. In addition to receiving the newly renamed Mandy Fisher Trophy, the winner of the tournament earned a place on the professional World Snooker Tour from the start of the 2022–23 snooker season.

Reanne Evans was the defending champion, having defeated Nutcharut Wongharuthai 6–3 in the 2019 final to win her 12th women's world title. However, Evans lost 1–4 to Wendy Jans in the quarter-finals, the first time in her career that she had not reached the semi-finals of the tournament. Three-time champion Ng On-yee came from 0–3 behind in her quarter-final against Wongharuthai to force a deciding frame, but Wongharuthai won the match 4–3 on the final black. The quarter-final losses by Evans and Ng meant that no former champion reached the semi-finals.

Wongharuthai won the tournament, defeating Wendy Jans 6–5 in the final. She became the first Thai player to win the women's world title, the 13th different winner of the tournament since its inception in 1976, the first new champion since 2015, and the only player besides Evans or Ng to win the title in 19 years. She gained a two-year professional tour card, allowing her to join the World Snooker Tour from the beginning of the following season. Upon her return to Thailand, she was granted an audience with the country's prime minister Prayut Chan o-cha, and its Minister for Tourism and Sports Pipat Ratchakitprakarn.

== Prize fund ==
The breakdown of prize money for the event is shown below:

- Winner: £6,000
- Runner-up: £2,500
- Semi-final: £1,250
- Quarter-final: £600
- Last 16: £300
- Preliminary Round : £150
- Highest break: £200
- Total: £17,200

== Final summary ==
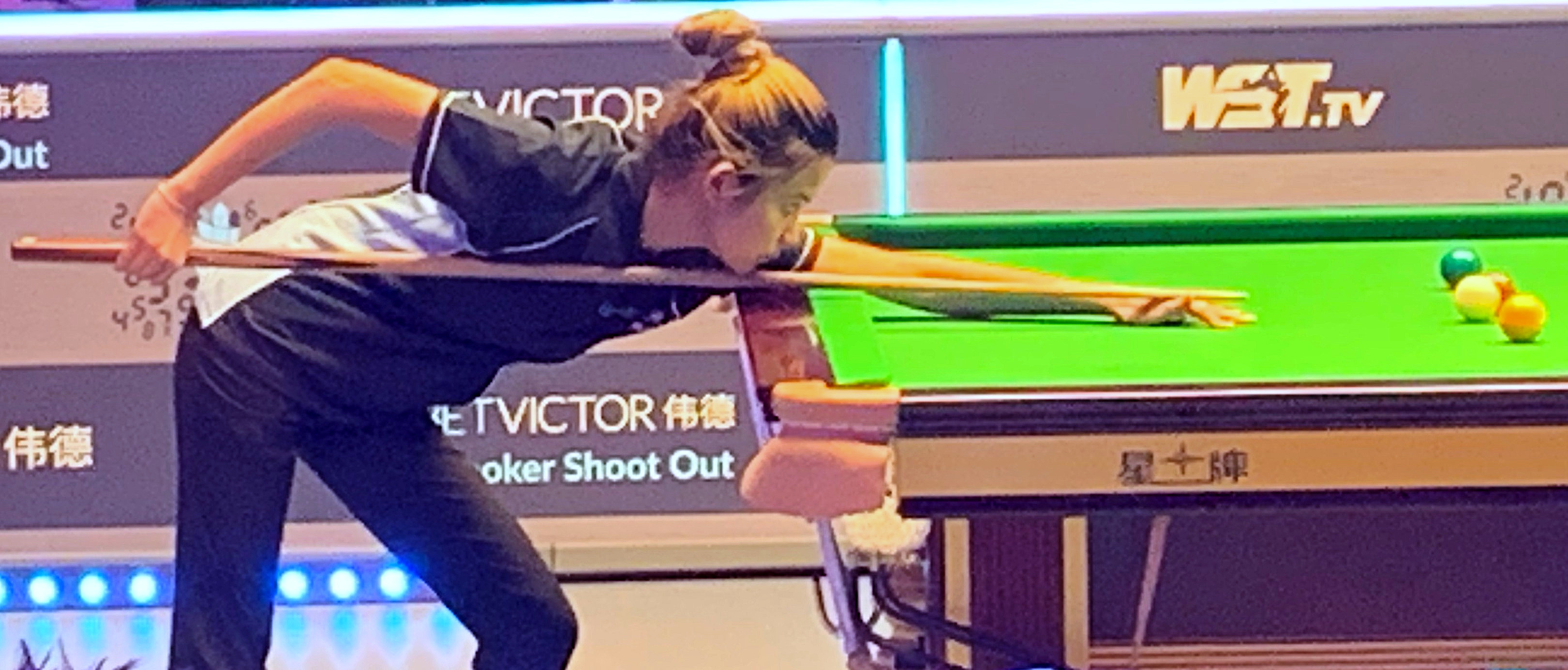
Nutcharut Wongharuthai won her first women's world title

The final, contested as the best of 11 frames between Thai player Nutcharut Wongharuthai and Belgian player Wendy Jans, lasted five hours and 40 minutes. Although Wongharuthai took an initial 2–1 lead, Jans then won four of the next five frames to lead 5–3, also contributing the final's highest break of 84 in the fourth frame. Wongharuthai later stated: "When I was 5–3 behind I thought that I had lost, and I really just started to play for fun because I was too tense. Luckily, it worked." Wongharuthai won the next two frames to level the scores at 5–5. Requiring a snooker in the decider with only the colours remaining, Jans potted the yellow and green before obtaining four foul points when Wongharuthai failed to escape from a snooker on the brown. Jans then potted the brown, blue, and pink, but missed a long black into the yellow pocket, leaving it over the middle. Wongharuthai potted the black to clinch the title.

== Results ==
=== Main draw ===
Round 1 Best of 7 frames
(Japan) **Miina Tani**	**4**
(England) Jan Hughes (23)	0
(Wales) **Laura Evans (7)**	**4**
(India) Pooja Galundia	2
(Russia) Mariia Shevchenko	2
(Belgium) **Anja Vandenbussche**	**4**
(England) **Jamie Hunter (22)**	**4**
(England) Harriet Haynes (19)	0
(England) Stephanie Daughtery (9)	3
(England) **Tessa Davidson**	**4**
(England) **Emma Parker (6)**	**4**
(England) Jasmine Bolsover	1
(England) Lesley Roberts	0
(Thailand) **Nutcharut Wongharuthai (3)**	**4**
(England) Zoe Killington (17)	0
(England) **Mary Talbot-Deegan (24)**	**4**

Round 2 Best of 7 frames
(England) **Reanne Evans (1)**	**4**
(Japan) Miina Tani	0
(Wales) Laura Evans (7)	1
(Belgium) **Wendy Jans (12)**	**4**
(Thailand) Ploychompoo Laokiatphong (10)	3
(Belgium) **Anja Vandenbussche**	**4**
(England) **Jamie Hunter (22)**	**4**
(England) Suzie Terry (8)	1
(England) **Rebecca Kenna (4)**	**4**
(England) Tessa Davidson	3
(England) **Emma Parker (6)**	**4**
(Poland) Dalia Alska	0
(England) Maria Catalano (5)	2
(Thailand) **Nutcharut Wongharuthai (3)**	**4**
(England) Mary Talbot-Deegan (24)	2
(Hong Kong) **Ng On Yee (2)**	**4**

Quarter-finals; Best of 7 frames
(England) Reanne Evans (1)	1
(Belgium) **Wendy Jans (12)**	**4**
(Belgium) Anja Vandenbussche	0
(England) **Jamie Hunter (22)**	**4**
(England) **Rebecca Kenna (4)**	**4**
(England) Emma Parker (6)	2
(Thailand) **Nutcharut Wongharuthai (3)**	**4**
(Hong Kong) Ng On Yee (2)	3

Semi-finals; Best of 9 frames
(Belgium) **Wendy Jans (12)**	**5**
(England) Jamie Hunter (22)	2
(England) Rebecca Kenna (4)	1
(Thailand) **Nutcharut Wongharuthai (3)**	**5**

Final; Best of 11 frames
(Belgium) Wendy Jans (12)	5
(Thailand) **Nutcharut Wongharuthai (3)**	**6**

Players listed in bold indicate match winners.

=== Final ===
Final: Best of 11 frames. Referee: Mark Beale; Ding Junhui Snooker Academy, Sheffield, England. 14 February 2022
Wendy Jans (12) (Belgium)			5–**6**			**Nutcharut Wongharuthai** (3) (Thailand)					
Frame	1	2	3	4	5	6	7	8	9	10	11
Wendy Jans; 30+ Breaks	40 -	**72** (31)	46 -	**84** (84)	**69** -	**71** -	39 -	**74** (30, 39)	18 –	13 -	53 -
Nutcharut Wongharuthai; 30+ Breaks	**51** -	38 -	**60** -	4 -	44 -	32 -	**67** -	15 -	**69** -	**81** (32)	**65** (30)
Frames won (Jans first)	0–1	1–1	1–2	2–2	3–2	4–2	4–3	5–3	5–4	5–5	5–6
84			Highest break			32					
1			50+ breaks			0					
3			30+ breaks			2					
**Nutcharut Wongharuthai wins the 2022 World Women's Snooker Championship**

Source: WPBSA Tournament Manager.
