= International Billiards and Snooker Federation =

Amateur gouvernant body for snooker and English billiards

- Sport: Snooker and English billiards (amateur)
- Jurisdiction: International
- Abbreviation: IBSF
- Founded: 1971
- Headquarters: Doha, Qatar
- President: Mubarak Al-Khayarin (Qatar)

Official website
- www.ibsf.info

The International Billiards & Snooker Federation (IBSF) is an organisation that governs non-professional snooker and English billiards around the world. As of January 2020, the organisation is headquartered in Doha, Qatar.

== History ==
The World Billiards and Snooker Council (WB&SC) was established in 1971, following a meeting of a number of national associations at a hotel in Malta during the World Amateur Billiards Championship. The associations were dissatisfied that the Billiards and Snooker Control Council was controlling both the UK and international games. Player and journalist Clive Everton served as the first secretary, and his office served as the first office of the WB&SC. In 1973, the WB&SC renamed itself as the International Billiards and Snooker Federation (IBSF) and began to control non-professional billiards and snooker championships.

== Aims and structure ==
The aims and objectives of the IBSF are to "co-ordinate, promote and develop the sports of billiards and snooker on a non-professional level" and to manage the competitions.

By the end of 1984, the IBSF had thirty countries as members. As of January 2020, the IBSF has seventy-three affiliated countries categorised into one of the five Olympic regions: Africa, Americas, Asia, Europe and Oceania. The IBSF board of directors has four executive officers (president, vice-president, secretary, and treasurer) plus two representatives from each Olympic region. The executive officers are responsible for the day-to-day running of the Federation and are answerable to IBSF members at the annual general meeting, which is normally held during the period of the IBSF World Snooker Championships.

== Events ==
1. IBSF World Snooker Championship (15-Red) (IBSF World 15-Red Snooker Championships) (Men - Women) Since 1963 M / 2003 W
2. IBSF World 6-Red snooker Championships (Men - Women) Since 2013 M & W
3. IBSF World 6-Red Cup (Men - Women) Since 2020 W / 2021 M
4. IBSF World Team Snooker Championship (Men - Women) Since 2013
5. IBSF World Under-21 Snooker Championship (Men - Women) Since 1987 M / 2015 W
6. IBSF World Under-18 Snooker Championship (Men - Women) Since 2015 M & W
7. World Open Under-16 Snooker Championships (Men - Women) Since 2017 M & W
8. IBSF World Masters Snooker Championships (Seniors Men) Since 2004
9. IBSF World Masters Team Snooker Championships (Seniors Men) Since 2013 (+2006)
10. IBSF World Para Snooker Championships Men Since
11. IBSF World Billiards Championship (Long-Up - 150-Up - Timed - Points) (Men - Women) Since 1926 M / 2015 W

== Regions ==
49 Nations:

1. Africa: 3 Nations
2. Asia (Asian Confederation of Billiard Sports): 21 Nations
3. Europe (European Billiards and Snooker Association): 21 Nations
4. Oceania: 2 Nations
5. Americas (Pan America Billiards & Snooker Association): 2 Nations

In 2020 Asia Pacific Snooker & Billiards Federation (APBSF) was established in Australia with 6 nations.

== Relationships to other organisations ==
The IBSF—alongside the World Professional Billiards and Snooker Association (WPBSA)—was one of the two snooker-focused organisational members of the World Confederation of Billiards Sports (WCBS). The WCBS is an organisation that promotes cue sports in the form of carom, pool and snooker; one of its aims is to gain the acceptance of cue sports disciplines into the Olympic Games.

The WPBSA terminated its relationship with the IBSF on 31 July 2017, over conflicts involving the two organisations' relative leadership positions within WCBS, making allegations of IBSF misconduct. As a result of the split, the WPBSA has revoked the Professional Main Tour cards that were once afforded to the IBSF World Men's and World Under-21 Champions. On 5 October 2017, WPBSA announced the formation of the World Snooker Federation (WSF), with stated goals similar to those of WCBS but with a focus on amateur and professional snooker, and an invitation for regional and national amateur snooker federations to join WSF.

As the IBSF and WPBSA were unable to come to a formal agreement, as required by the WCBS, both had their WCBS membership terminated in December 2018. In March 2019, the IBSF was reinstated to the WCBS to represent snooker.

== See also ==
=== Organ ===
- World Professional Billiards and Snooker Association
- World Snooker Federation
- World Women's Snooker
- World Billiards
- World Confederation of Billiards Sports
- World Pool-Billiard Association
- Union Mondiale de Billard
- Billiards World Cup Association
- International Carrom Federation
- Women's Billiards Association

=== Events ===
- WSF Championship
- List of snooker tournaments
- World Snooker Tour
- World Snooker Championship
- World Women's Snooker Championship (1976-Ongoing)
- Women's Professional Snooker Championship (1934–1950)
- World Seniors Championship
- World Seniors Tour
- World Billiards Championship (English billiards)
- World Women's Billiards Championship (1931-Ongoing)
- Women's Professional Billiards Championship (1930–1950)
- Six-red World Championship

=== Types ===
- Cue sports
- Snooker
- Six-red snooker
- Billiards
- Pocket billiards
- Three-cushion billiards
- Carom billiards
- Russian pyramid
- Carrom
