= Jamie Hunter (snooker player) =

English snooker and billiards player

Personal information
- Born: c. 1996 (age 29–30) Whiston Hospital

Sport
- Country: England
- Sport: Snooker
- Highest ranking: World Women's Snooker: 5 (October 2022)
- Best ranking finish: October 2022

Jamie Hunter is an English snooker player. She started playing on the World Women's Snooker tour in 2021 and has won two ranking tournaments, the 2022 US Women's Open and the 2022 Australian Women's Open.

== Career ==
At the 2021 EBSA European Snooker Championship, Hunter won all three of her group stage matches, then defeated Caty Dehaene, Stephanie Daughtery and Anastasia Nechaeva to reach the final, where she faced 12-time champion Wendy Jans. Jans took a 3–0 lead in the best-of-seven frames final, and won 4–1. In the women's team event, Hunter and Mary Talbot-Deegan won the title by defeating Rebecca Kenna and Emma Parker 3–2 in the final.

Hunter claimed the 2022 World Women's Billiards Championship title with a 304–148 victory against Snenthra Babu.

Hunter won her first women's ranking tournament in snooker at the 2022 US Women's Open. Having qualified for the quarter-finals by winning all three of her group matches, she eliminated Frances Tso 3–0 and then Talbot-Deegan 4–1. Hunter became the first transgender woman to win a ranking tournament by defeating Kenna 4–1 in the final.

She also took the following ranking tournament, the 2022 Australian Women's Open, with a 4–3 win against Jessica Woods in the final.

== Personal life ==
Hunter started playing snooker after she sustained a serious ankle injury that prevented her from continuing to play football. She works in IT for a local council.

Hunter, who publicly transitioned in 2019, has been criticised for participating in women's snooker events. Former UK Champion Maria Catalano has objected to Hunter's inclusion in women's tournaments and has called for transgender players to be banned from the women's tour, claiming that "if this is allowed and becomes more common, there is no future for women’s snooker." Hunter has denied that she enjoys an advantage in women's snooker and stated: "We just want to exist, whether it's sport or not."

== Performance timeline ==
World Women's Snooker

Tournament	2021/ 22	2022/ 23
Current tournaments
UK Championship	1R	SF
US Open	NH	W
Australian Open	NH	W
Scottish Open	NH	QF
Masters	QF	2R
Belgian Open	NH	QF
Asia-Pacific Open	NH	A
World Championship	SF	2R
British Open	QF	
Former tournaments
Winchester Open	QF	NH

Performance Table Legend
LQ	lost in the qualifying draw	#R	lost in the early rounds of the tournament (WR = Wildcard round, RR = Round robin)	QF	lost in the quarter-finals
SF	lost in the semi-finals	F	lost in the final	W	won the tournament
DNQ	did not qualify for the tournament	A	did not participate in the tournament	WD	withdrew from the tournament

NH / Not Held	means an event was not held.
NR / Non-Ranking Event	means an event is/was no longer a ranking event.
R / Ranking Event	means an event is/was a ranking event.
MR / Minor-Ranking Event	means an event is/was a minor-ranking event.
PA / Pro-am Event	means an event is/was a pro-am event.
