= World Professional Billiards and Snooker Association =

Sports governing body

- Sport: Snooker (professional) and English billiards
- Jurisdiction: International
- Abbreviation: WPBSA
- Founded: 1968; 58 years ago
- Headquarters: Bristol, England, UK
- Chairman: Jason Ferguson
- Replaced: Professional Billiard Players Association (PBPA)
- (founded): 1946; 80 years ago

Official website
- www.wpbsa.com

The World Professional Billiards and Snooker Association (WPBSA) is the governing body of professional snooker and English billiards. It is headquartered in Bristol, England. Founded as the Professional Billiard Players Association (PBPA) in 1946, with Joe Davis as chairman, it was revived in 1968 after some years of inactivity and renamed the World Professional Billiards and Snooker Association in 1970. Its current chairman is Jason Ferguson.

The WPBSA devises and publishes the official rules of the two sports. It promotes their global development at the grassroots, amateur, and professional levels; enforces conduct regulations and disciplines players who breach them; and works to combat corruption, such as by investigating betting irregularities. Additionally, it is involved in the coaching, development and training of referees. It also supports World Women's Snooker, World Disability Billiards and Snooker, and English billiards through World Billiards.

The WPBSA owns a 26 per cent share of World Snooker Ltd, which organises the professional World Snooker Tour, and runs its own second-tier tournament Q Tour.

== Overview ==
According to its financial statements for the year ending 30 June 2019, the principal activities of the WPBSA are "the governance of professional snooker and billiards through the regulation and application of the rules of the association, the development of snooker and billiards as a sport and the sanctioning of the Professional Snooker Tour". The governing body for the non-professional aspect of snooker and billiards is the International Billiards and Snooker Federation (IBSF).

The WPBSA has a number of associated organisations, including World Snooker, World Billiards, World Women's Snooker and World Disability Billiards and Snooker.

- World Snooker Tour is responsible for running and administrating snooker's ranking and non-ranking professional circuit. These include the World Open, UK Championship, Welsh Open, China Open and the World Snooker Championship. It also holds the commercial rights for the professional game. Barry Hearn's Matchroom Sport owns 51 per cent of World Snooker, whilst the WPBSA owns 26 per cent. In January 2020, World Snooker was rebranded as World Snooker Tour.
- World Billiards supervises the English billiards ranking tournaments and ranking list. It was established as a limited company in 2011, with all shares owned by the WPBSA.
- World Women's Snooker (WWS) had changed its name from World Ladies Billiards and Snooker and Association (WLBSA) to World Ladies Billiards and Snooker when it became a subsidiary company of the WPBSA in December 2015. It moved to becoming World Women's Snooker in 2018. WWS supervises the Women's ranking tournaments and ranking list.
- World Disability Billiards and Snooker (WDBS) is a subsidiary company of the WPBSA set up in 2015 with a remit to create opportunities for people with disabilities play cue sports.

In November 2020, the members of the WBPSA voted to separate the responsibilities of the Association between two entities: "WPBSA Governance and Development", and a new "WPBSA Players" organisation. WPBSA Governance and Development will be responsible for disciplinary matters, monitoring betting, and drug testing. WPBSA Players will be responsible for support and representation of players.

Jason Ferguson became the WPBSA chairman in 2010, having previously held the role from 2001 to 2003. Rex Williams was chairman for 13 years until 1987, when he was replaced by John Virgo. Previous presidents include Jeffrey Archer, who served from 1997 to 1999.

== History ==
A Professional Billiard Players Association (PBPA) was formed on 26 July 1946, with Joe Davis as chairman. The professional game was in decline in the 1950s and 1960s and the PBPA was also dormant until being restarted in April 1968 with eight professional members. Mike Green was designated as the Secretary. Membership of the Association was by application, with playing achievements and disciplinary records the main factors taken into account. This means of becoming professional was later replaced by a series of "pro ticket" events. Prior to the formation of the WPBSA, the world governing body of both snooker and English billiards was the Billiards Association and Control Council (BACC or BA&CC), later known as the Billiards and Snooker Control Council.

The BACC announced in August 1968 that the world professional snooker championship would be run on a knockout basis, rather than the challenge system that had been in place from 1964, and in September 1969 that "The BA & CC and Professional Billiard Players Association have reached agreement regarding procedure for turning professional and other events governed by the BA & CC."

The PBPA disaffiliated from the BA&CC from 1 October 1970, and was renamed the WPBSA on 12 December 1970, soon taking control of the running of the professional game.

The WPBSA was reorganised as a limited company on 13 January 1982, with the intention that it would negotiate contracts with television companies and sponsors, something that had previously been in the control of promoters like Mike Watterson, as well as organising the tournaments. In 1985, Green retired as Secretary and was succeeded by Martin Blake, at which point the Association moved its headquarters from Birmingham to Bristol.

It was reported during the 1987 World Snooker Championship that WPBSA chairman Williams was taking beta blockers. These were banned under International Olympic Committee rules, but not prohibited in snooker. Colin Moynihan, a British MP, called for Williams to resign and any players using beta blockers to withdraw from competing.

In 2001, in a legal case brought by Stephen Hendry, Mark Williams and their management company, the WPBSA was found to have taken advantage of its dominant position in the snooker market by forcing its members to seek permission to play in tournaments, which could allow the WPBSA to prevent rival organisations from competing with it. Former WPBSA chairman Geoff Foulds lost a libel case that he had brought against The Daily Mirror when it accused him of submitting falsified expense claims to the WPBSA.

When World Snooker scheduled the 2008 Bahrain Championship on dates which clashed with Premier League Snooker matches scheduled five months earlier with World Snooker approval, this caused four leading players (including Higgins) to miss the Bahrain event and consequently lose ranking points—Higgins called the clash "laughable". Premier League organiser Barry Hearn commented that "I am very disappointed and I can't understand why World Snooker hasn't discussed dates with us", while Higgins and his manager Pat Mooney threatened legal action over the ranking points situation. Supported by a number of senior players, Hearn became the chairman of the WPBSA in December 2009, with Mooney also joining him on the board.

The body received criticism in the late 2000s. John Higgins had been particularly vocal in his opinion that World Snooker had not done enough to promote the game in new territories, particularly in Eastern Europe. The rival World Series of Snooker was launched by a consortium including Higgins in 2008.

In 2008, the Association's benevolent fund was investigated for accounting irregularities and the apparent involvement in the decision-making process of WPBSA officials. The decision to decline an application for a grant from Chris Small, a former player who retired due to Ankylosing spondylitis, was also criticised by several of the game's leading figures.

=== Promotional activities ===
A subsidiary promotions company, WPBSA Promotions Ltd, was founded in 1983. World Snooker has been successful in promoting the sport in China, a major growth area for the sport, and in other territories including Germany.

The World Snooker Federation logo

The 2008 Bahrain Championship was the first ranking tournament to be staged in the Middle East, which cost the organisation around £500,000 in prize money and organisational costs. One session at the event did not attract any audience, and the largest attendance for any of the sessions was 150. In 2019, World Snooker announced that there would be a ranking event in Saudi Arabia in 2020, the first in a ten-year series. Amnesty International criticised the announcement due to concerns about human rights in the country.

The WPBSA supports coaching in cue sports through an accredited programme, and in 2013 initiated the "Cue Zone into Schools" programme, which took scaled-down tables into schools and was intended to interest school children in taking up the game. In 2019, the WPBSA announced the creation of an all-party parliamentary group for snooker, chaired by Conor Burns, a Member of Parliament (MP).

In 2015, the Association submitted an unsuccessful bid for snooker to be played at the 2020 Summer Olympics in Tokyo. Another bid has been put forward for Paris 2024 through a branch of the association formed in 2017, the World Snooker Federation.
