= World Billiards =

World Billiards Ltd
- Sport: English billiards
- Category: Sport governing body
- Jurisdiction: International
- Abbreviation: WBL
- Founded: 2011
- Affiliation: WPBSA
- President: Roxton Chapman
- Board members: Paul Lloyd (Chairman), Darren Clark, Chris Coumbe, Paul Collier, Aonghus McAnally

Official website
- www.world-billiards.com

World Billiards (Limited) was founded in November 2011 as a subsidiary of the World Professional Billiards & Snooker Association (WPBSA). It includes former members of EBOS (English-Billiards Open Series) and WPBSA, and is the governing body for English billiards.

As of 2012, the distinction between professional and amateur players was removed and the WPBSA World Professional Billiards Championship became simply the World Billiards Championship. Tournaments are now held in modern short multiple game format, long single game format and the more traditional timed format.

== Promotional activities ==
Since 2012 World Billiards has organised the World Billiards Championship (English billiards) plus up to 20 other world ranking tournaments per year. Apart from the World Championship, other major ranking tournaments include the American Cup in Canada, the European Open, the Pacific International in Australia and the Asian Grand Prix in Singapore.

=== World Billiards Championships ===
Date	Format	Winner	Score	Runner-up	Score
2012	Short	(India) Rupesh Shah	6	(Australia) Matthew Bolton	2
2012	Timed	(India) Pankaj Advani	1,895	(England) Mike Russell	1,216
2013	Short	(England) David Causier	6	(India) Alok Kumar	1
2013	Long	(Singapore) Peter Gilchrist	1,500	(England) David Causier	1,085
2014	Short	(India) Pankaj Advani	6	(Singapore) Peter Gilchrist	2
2014	Timed	(India) Pankaj Advani	1,928	(England) Robert Hall	893
2015	Short	(England) David Causier	6	(England) Robert Hall	1
2015	Long	(England) David Causier	1,500	(Singapore) Peter Gilchrist	1,277
2016	Short	(England) David Causier	8	(India) Dhruv Sitwala	6
2016	Timed	(England) Mike Russell	2,224	(England) David Causier	1115
2017	Short	(England) David Causier	8	(England) Sourav Kothari	4
2017	Long	(England) David Causier	1,500	(Singapore) Peter Gilchrist	779
2018	Timed	(India) Sourav Kothari	1,134	(Singapore) Peter Gilchrist	944
2019	Timed	(Singapore) Peter Gilchrist	1,307	(India) Sourav Kothari	967
2020		Not played
2021		Not played
2022	Timed	(England) David Causier	1,776	(Singapore) Peter Gilchrist	1,092
2023	Timed	(Singapore) Peter Gilchrist	1,824	(England) David Causier	783
2024	Timed	(England) David Causier	2,088	(England) Rob Hall	1,109
2025	Timed	(England) David Causier	2,948	(India) Dhruv Sitwala	677

== See also ==
- English billiards
- World Billiards Championship (English billiards)
- World Professional Billiards & Snooker Association
