= R Umadevi Nagaraj =

Indian English billiards and snooker player

Revanna Umadevi Nagaraj
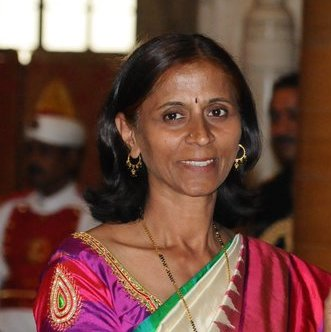
- Revanna Umadevi in 2018
- Born: 11 February 1965 (age 61); India
- Sport country: India
- World Women's Billiards Champion: 2012

Revanna Umadevi Nagaraj (born 11 February 1965), is an Indian professional player of English billiards and snooker. She is a World Women's Billiard champion (2012) and a six-time Indian national Billiards champion. She had defeated Eva Palmius during the London 2012 Championship to become the World Champion.

== Life ==
Umadevi was born in 1965. It was in the midst of her life, when Umadevi realised her potential in Billiards. While working as a typist in Bangalore, she used to go to the Karnataka Government Secretariat Club to play table tennis. One day, while waiting for a long time for her turn for table tennis, she decided to move on to the Billiards table next to the table tennis room and gradually started loving the game. She was mentored by prominent billiards players and coaches such as Shri. Arvind Savur, S. Jairaj, and M. G Jayaram. In 2012, Umadevi won the title of World Billiards Champion as well as the 8 Ball Pool National Champion.

== Awards ==
She was awarded Eklavaya Award in 2009 for her contribution to Billiards by the Government of Karnataka. She became the World Billiards Champion and 8 Ball Pool National Champion in 2012. She received Nari Shakti Puraskar from the President of India Ram Nath Kovind among the list of 30 great women achievers of 2017 in India.

== Titles and achievements ==
Outcome	No.	Year	Championship	Opponent	Score	Ref.
Winner	1	2012	World Women's Billiards Championship	Emma Bonney	201–143	
