= English billiards =

Cue sport combining the disciplines of carom and pocket billiards

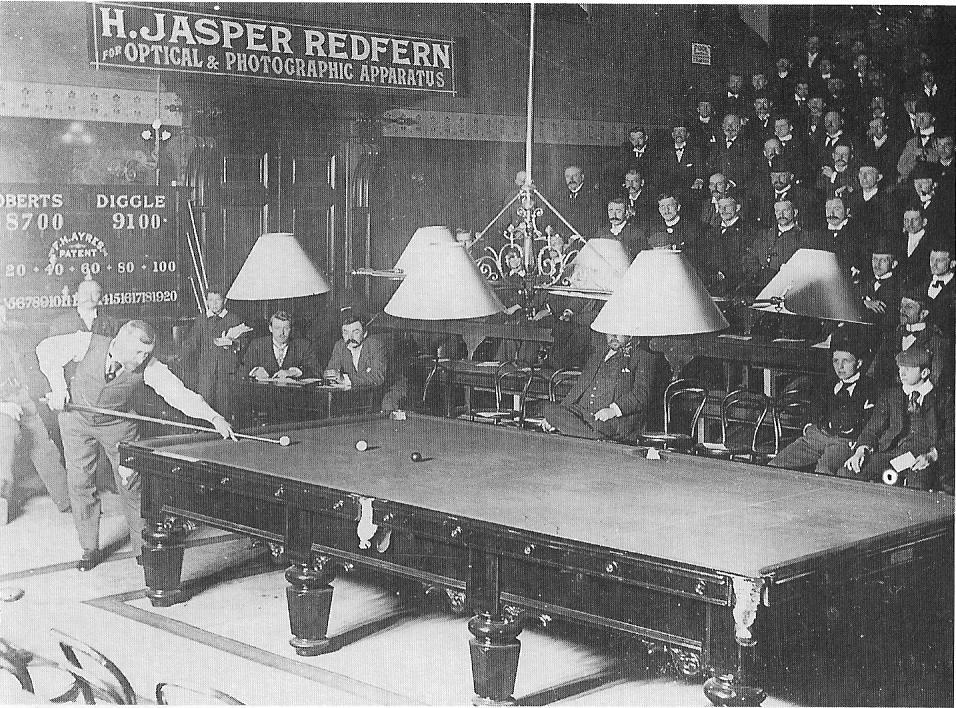
A late nineteenth-century match between John Roberts, Jr and Edward Diggle

English billiards, called simply billiards in the UK and in many former British colonies, is a cue sport that combines the aspects of carom billiards and pool. Two cue balls (one white and one yellow) and a red object ball are used: sometimes the balls are marked with dots. Each player or team uses a different cue ball. It is played on a billiards table with the same dimensions as one used for snooker and points are scored for cannons and pocketing the balls.

== History ==
A game of English billiards, London, 1944

English billiards originated in England, and was originally called the winning and losing carambole game, folding in the names of three predecessor games, the winning game, the losing game, and an early form of carom billiards that combined to form it.

The winning game was played with two white balls, and was a 12-point contest. To start, the player who could strike a ball at one end of the table and get the ball to come to rest nearest the opposite cushion without lying against it earned the right to shoot for points first. This is the origin of the modern custom of "stringing" (or "lagging").

A player who pocketed the opponent's ball scored two points, as is still the case in modern billiards. A player missing the opponent's ball, considered a foul, added one point to the opponent's total; the shooter conceded two points if their own ball went into a pocket after striking the opponent's ball; and the player conceded three points if the cue ball was pocketed without even hitting the opponent's ball. These rules continued to exist in English billiards until 1983, when a standard of two points for all fouls was introduced.

By contrast, in the losing game a player could only score two points by pocketing the cue ball through a carom off the opponent's ball. "Winning hazard" and "losing hazard" are terms still mentioned in the official rules for these two fundamental shot types, although "pot" and "in-off" have become the usual terms for them in British English.

The final element was the cannon (or carom) shot, which came from carom billiards, a game popular in various countries of western Continental Europe, especially France, and in many parts of Asia and South America. In the 1700s, the carom game added a red object ball to the two white cue balls, and dispensed with the pockets. This ball was adopted into the English game, which retained the pockets, and the goal was to cannon off both the red and the opponent's ball on a single shot, earning 2 points. This influence on the English game appears to have come about through the popularity of French tables in English coffee houses; London alone had over two thousand such establishments in the early 18th century. One period advertisement read: "A very good French Billiard Table, little the worse for wearing, full size, with all the materials fit for French or English play".

The three ancestral games had their British heyday in the 1770s, but had combined into English billiards, with a 16-point score total, by approximately 1800. The skill required in playing these games helped retire the billiard mace in favour of the cue stick.

Notably, there are a number of pocket billiard games directly descended from English billiards, including bull dog, scratch pool, thirty-one pool, and thirty-eight (the latter of which influenced cowboy pool). English Billiards was virtually unknown in the United States until 1913, when Melbourn Inman visited the US and played the game against Willie Hoppe. By 1915 the game had become rather popular, prompting American billiard hall proprietors of the period to increase the number of English-style tables in their establishments. It also became favoured in British colonies; the game's longest-running champion was an Australian, Walter Lindrum, who held the World Professional Billiards Championship from 1933 until his retirement in 1950. The game remains popular in the UK, although it has been eclipsed by snooker.

=== As a sport ===
The first governing body of the game, the Billiards Association, was formed in the UK in 1885, a period that saw a number of sporting bodies founded across the British sporting world. By the mid-20th century, the principal sanctioning body was the Billiards Association and Control Council (later the Billiards and Snooker Control Council), formed in 1919 by an amalgamation of the Billiards Association and the Billiards Control Club (founded in 1908).

In the 19th century and up through the mid-1950s, a common way for championship titles to change hands was by a challenge match. A challenge was issued to a championship title holder accompanied by stake money held by a third party. Up until the first organised professional tournament in 1870, all English billiards champions were decided by challenge.

The first champion was Jonathan Kentfield, who held the title from 1820 to 1849, losing it to John Roberts Sr. after Kentfield refused his challenge. Roberts's 21-year reign lasted until he lost to William Cook in 1870. That year was also the first in which an English billiards challenge match was held in the United States.

From 1870 to 1983 the champions were: William Cook, (1870, 1871–74); John Roberts Jr., (1870, 1871, 1875–77, 1885); Joseph Bennett, (1870, 1880–81); Charles Dawson, (1899–1900, 1901, 1903); H. W. Stevenson, (1901, 1909–11); Melbourne Inman, (1908–09, 1912–19); Willie Smith, (1920, 1923); Tom Newman, (1921–22, 1924–27); Joe Davis, (1928–32); Walter Lindrum, (1933–50); Clark McConachy, (1951–68); Rex Williams, (1968–76, 1982–83); and Fred Davis, (1980).

A "Women's Billiard Association" was formed in Britain in 1931. One of the founders was Teresa Billington-Greig who had been a leading suffragette and was then married to a billiard ball manufacturer.

Over the course of the 20th century, English billiards was largely superseded as the favoured cue sport in the United Kingdom by snooker and the rise of English-style eight-ball pool. The game does retain some popularity amongst snooker players, who can use the same equipment for both games and play the game to practise ball control.

== Rules ==
=== Balls and table ===
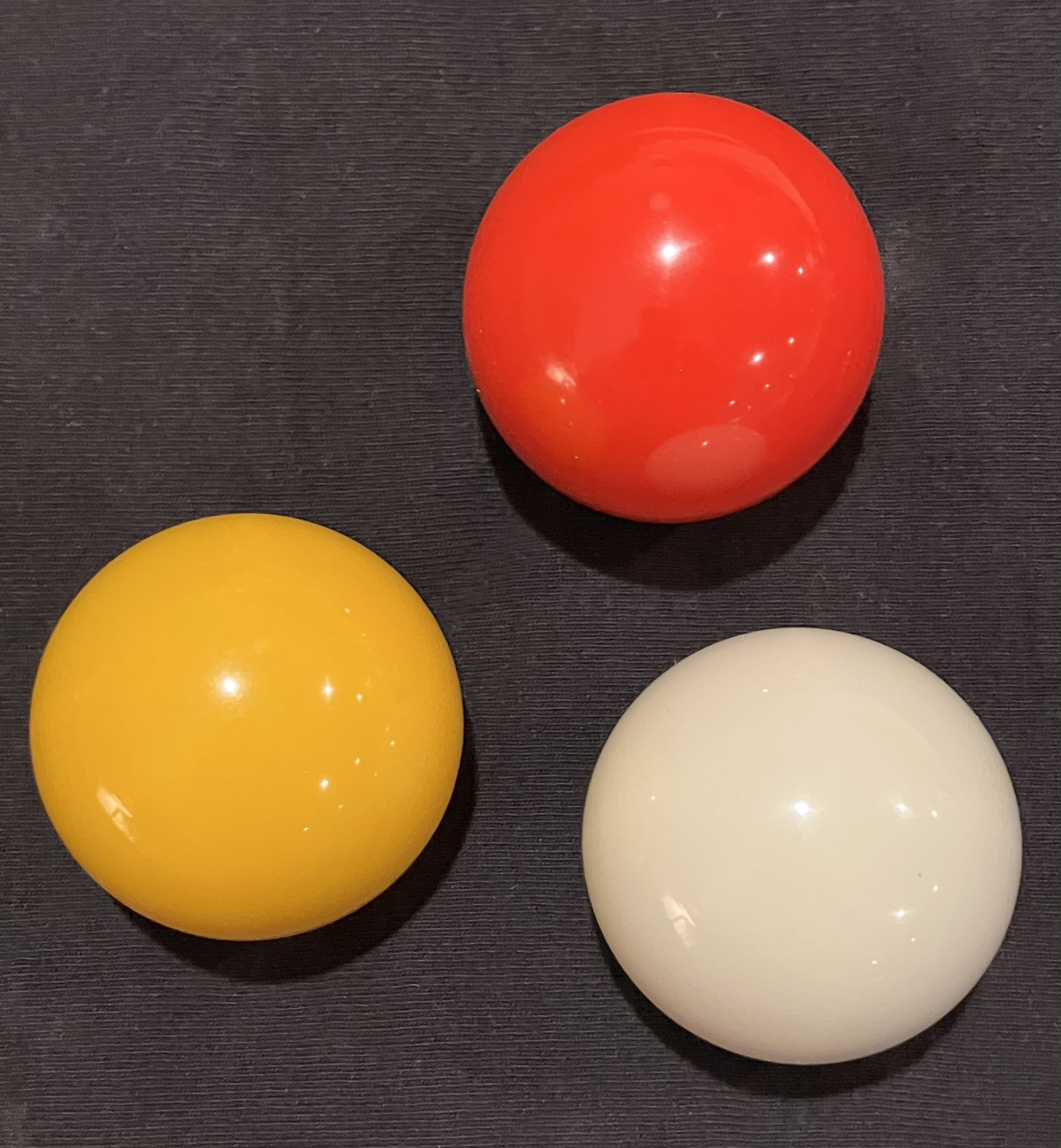
The game is played with 3 snooker balls coloured white, yellow and red, similarly to the colours of carom balls.

There are three balls. They are the same size as snooker balls (52.5 mm or 2 1/16 in with a tolerance of 0.05 mm) and they must weigh the same to a tolerance of 0.5 g within a set.

The balls are designated as:

- White – the cue ball for player 1, and an object ball for player 2
- Yellow – the cue ball for player 2, and an object ball for player 1 (historically a white ball with spots was used)
- Red – an object ball for both players

The billiard table used has the same dimensions as in snooker, and in many venues, both games are played on the same equipment. The playing area of a standard tournament table measures 11 feet 8 inches by 5 ft 10 in (3.556 m by 1.778 m) with a tolerance of 1/2 inch (1.26 cm) in both directions, though smaller ones, down to half size, are often found in snooker halls, pubs and home billiard rooms.

=== Beginning the game ===
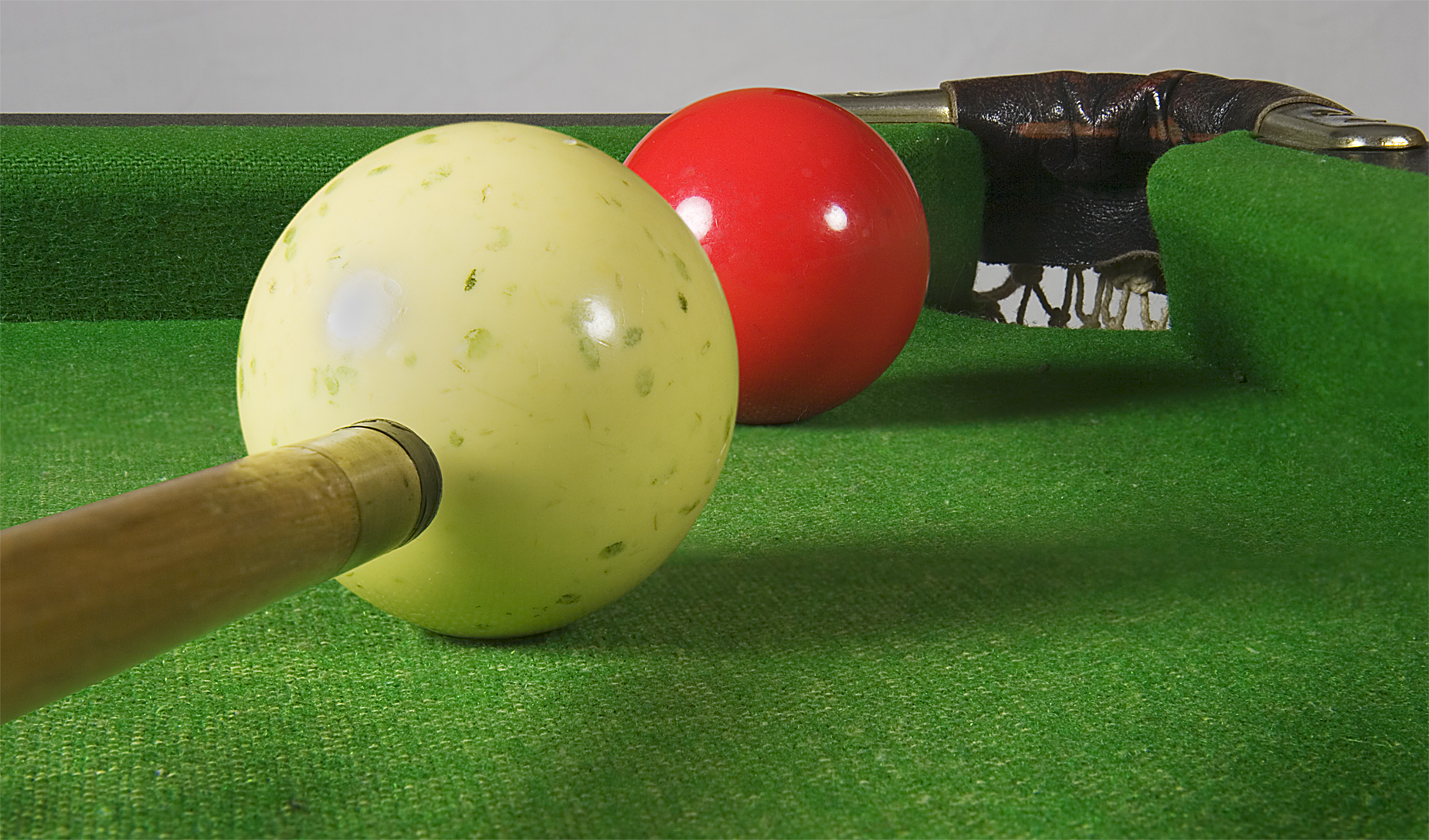
A game in progress, red ball about to be potted.

To see who will be the starting player, players perform a lag, where both simultaneously hit a cue ball up the table, bouncing it off the top cushion so that it returns to baulk (the first quarter-length of the table). The player who gets their ball closer to the baulk cushion can now choose which cue ball they want to use during the game and to break or let the opponent break.

The red ball is placed on the spot at the top of the table (same as the black spot in snooker), and the first player begins by playing in-hand from the "D" behind the baulk line. The other cue ball remains off the table until the opponent's first turn, when they play in hand from the "D".

=== Scoring ===
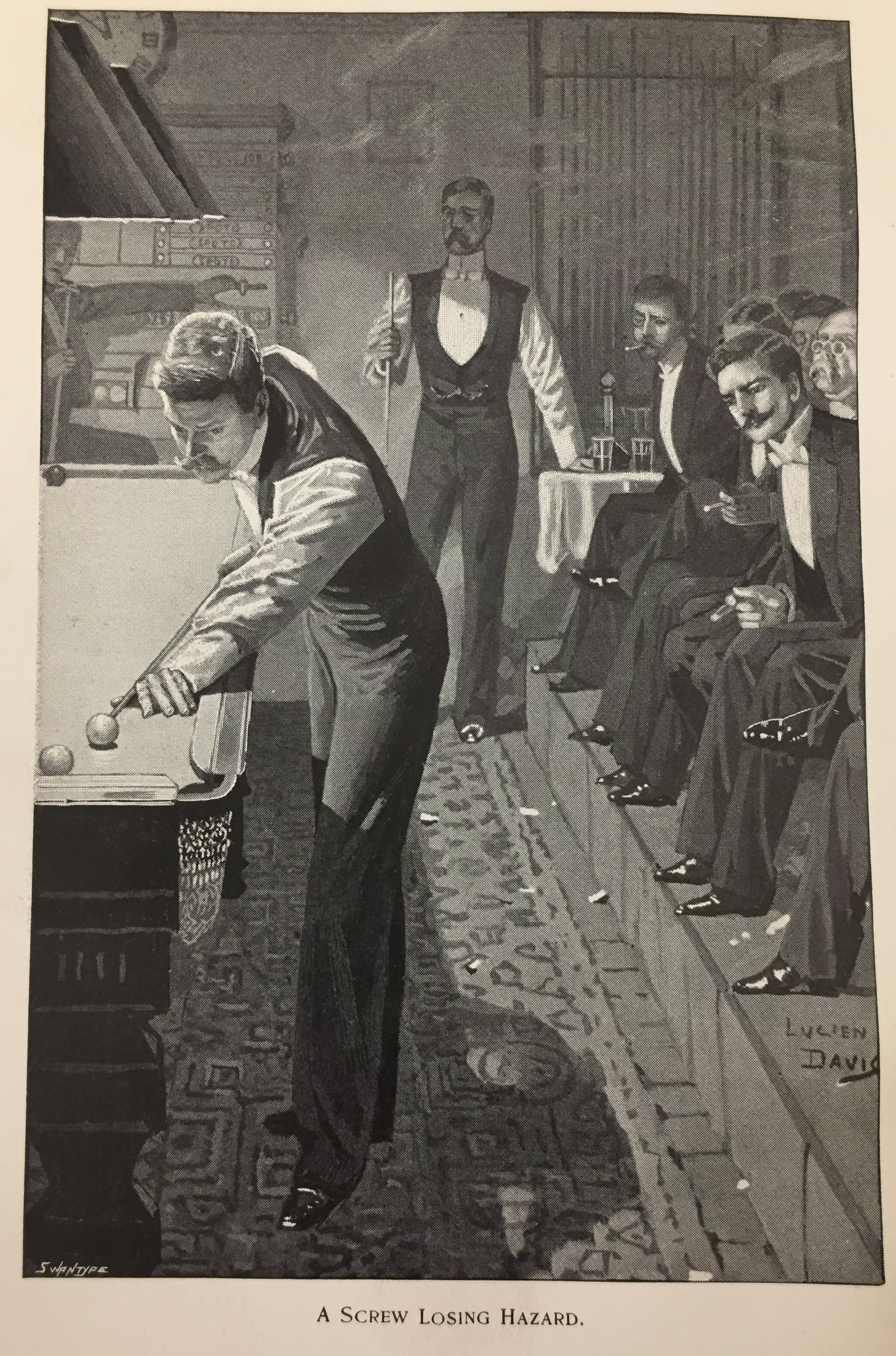
Playing for a losing hazard

Points are awarded as follows:

- Cannon – striking the cue ball so that it hits, in any order, the other cue ball and the red ball on the same shot: 2 points.
- Winning hazard (or potting, in snooker terms) – striking another ball with one's cue ball so that the red enters a pocket: 3 points; or striking another ball with one's cue ball so that the other cue ball enters a pocket: 2 points.
- Losing hazard (in-off in snooker terms) – striking one's cue ball so that it hits another ball and then enters a pocket: 3 points if the red ball was hit first; 2 points if the other cue ball was hit first; 2 points if the red and the other cue ball are hit simultaneously.

Combinations of the above may all be scored on the same shot. The most that can be scored in a single shot is therefore 10 – the red and the other cue ball are both potted via a cannon (the red must be struck first), and the cue ball is also potted, making a losing hazard off the red.

The winner is determined by a player reaching a fixed number of points set at the start of the game, or by which player is leading at the end of a timed game.

=== Other rules ===
If the red is potted it is respotted on the spot at the top of the table (the black spot). After the red has been potted twice off the spot in a row (i.e. without a cannon or losing hazard), it is respotted on the middle spot. If the middle spot is occupied, it goes on the pyramid spot (the pink spot in snooker). If both the middle and pyramid spots are occupied, it goes back on the spot. When potted from the middle or pyramid spot, it returns to the spot at the top of the table.

After a losing hazard, play continues in-hand from the "D". When playing from in-hand, a striker must touch a ball or cushion out of baulk before striking a ball in baulk.

If playing in-hand and all balls on the table are in baulk, and contact is not made with any ball, this is a miss, but not a foul because all balls are in baulk, and a cushion was required to make the shot; 2 points are awarded to the opponent, who must play from where the balls have come to rest.

If an opponent's cue ball is potted, it remains off the table until it is that opponent's turn to play, when it is returned to that player, who may play it in-hand from the "D". There is one exception to this rule: If the striker has made 15 consecutive hazards, the non-striker's ball must be spotted before the next shot, in the Middle of the Baulk-line or, if that spot is occupied, on the right-hand corner of the "D", as viewed from baulk. It becomes a "line ball" and may not be played directly from baulk. This is because if it were not spotted, there would be no legal play possible.

If the cue ball is touching an object ball, then the balls must be respotted: red on its spot and opponent's ball in the centre spot, with the striker to play from in-hand.

Matches held under professional regulations include a rule forcing the player to execute a shot in a way to have their cue ball cross the baulk line, heading towards the baulk cushion, once between 80 and 99 points in every 100 in a running break.

=== Fouls ===
If a foul occurs, two points are awarded to the opposing player who has the choice of playing from where the balls lie or they can be respotted.

There are a few different ways a foul can occur, by:

- Playing/Striking the opponent's cue ball or Red object ball
- Making any ball jump off the table
- Failing to make contact between one's cue ball and at least one object ball (unless double baulked)
- A double-hit or push shot
- Jumping one's cue ball over an object ball
- Playing a 16th consecutive hazard or 76th consecutive cannon
- When in-hand, not hitting an object ball or cushion out of baulk before hitting a ball in baulk.

== See also ==
- English Amateur Billiards Championship
- International Billiards and Snooker Federation
  - IBSF World Billiards Championship
- World Professional Billiards and Snooker Association
