= Cue sports in India =

- Governing body: Billiards and Snooker Federation of India
- First played: December 1881

Cue sports have a long history in India. The game of snooker originated among British Army officers stationed in India in the latter half of the 19th century.

Billiard champions like Wilson Jones, Michael Ferreira, and Geet Sethi have come out of India. Pankaj Advani is another successful Indian player. Training camps for identifying talent and providing them regional and state sponsorship have been organised by the Billiards and Snooker Federation in various parts of the country.

== History ==
The origin of snooker dates back to the latter half of the 19th century. In the 1870s, billiards was a popular activity amongst British Army officers stationed in India and several variations of the game were devised during this time. One such variation originated at the officers' mess of the 11th Devonshire Regiment in 1875, which combined the rules of two pocket billiards games, pyramid and black pool. The former was played with fifteen red balls positioned in a triangle, while the latter involved the potting of designated coloured balls. The game developed its own identity in 1884 when its first set of rules was finalised by Sir Neville Chamberlain, an English officer who helped develop and popularise the game at Stone House in Ooty on a table built by Burroughes & Watts that was brought over by boat. The word "snooker" was a slang term for first-year cadets and inexperienced military personnel, but Chamberlain would often use it to describe the inept performance of one of his fellow officers at the table. The name instantly stuck with the players.

The earliest contemporary reference to cue sports in India appears in a letter written by Captain Sheldrick from Calcutta on 2 February 1886. The letter gives a detailed account of a game called "Snookers". The letter also contains references to the game being played among members of the British Indian Army in 1884. British officer Ian Hamilton, who was stationed in Ooty from 1882 to 1884, wrote a letter in 1938 in which he noted, "I have never doubted that my old friend Sir Neville Chamberlain invented the game of Snooker. I was in at Ootacamund in 1882-84 and there still must be some crowd left who can testify to the belief their current that Snooker owed its birth to Neville Chamberlain fertile brain. Could the game have existed in Ooty even before Chamberlain arrival just waiting for him to discover it and give it a new name. This is a certainly a possibility." The Billiards and Snooker Federation of India (BFSI) states that Ooty is "the most credible birthplace for the game of Snooker", however, the federation rejects the theory that the game was already established in Ooty. The BSFI also states that, based on available evidence, the first snooker game in India occurred at Ooty "almost precisely" in December 1881.

== Total medals won by Indian's in Cue Sports in Major tournaments ==
Competition	Gold	Silver	Bronze	Total
World Snooker Championship	4	3	19	26
Asian Games	5	4	6	15
Total	9	7	25	41

- updated till 2023

== Performance by Players in Billiards Tournaments ==
Tournament	Name	Winner	Runner-up
World Billiards Championship	Pankaj Advani	17	3
World Billiards Championship	Geet Sethi	3	4
World Billiards Championship	Michael Ferreira	3	2
World Billiards Championship	Chitra Magimairaj	2	2
World Billiards Championship	Wilson Jones	2	1
World Billiards Championship	Rupesh Shah	2	0
World Billiards Championship	Ashok Shandilya	1	4
World Billiards Championship	R Umadevi Nagaraj	1	3
World Billiards Championship	Manoj Kothari	1	0
World Billiards Championship	Anuja Thakur	1	0
World Billiards Championship	Sourav Kothari	0	4
World Billiards Championship	Devendra Joshi	0	2
World Billiards Championship	Alok Kumar	0	1
World Billiards Championship	Bhaskar Balachandra	0	1
World Billiards Championship	Dhruv Sitwala	0	1
World Billiards Championship	Satish Mohan	0	1
World Billiards Championship	Snenthra Babu	0	1
World Billiards Championship	Subhash Agarwal	0	1
WPBSA World Championships	Geet Sethi	5	2
WPBSA World Championships	Pankaj Advani	1	0
WPBSA World Championships	Devendra Joshi	0	1
WPBSA World Championships	Dhruv Sitwala	0	1
WBL World Championships	Sourav Kothari	1	2
WBL World Championships	Dhruv Sitwala	0	1

- updated till 2023

== Performance by Players in Snooker Tournaments ==
Tournament	Name	Winner	Runner-up
World Snooker Championship	Pankaj Advani	3	1
World Snooker Championship	Omprakesh Agrawal	1	0
World Snooker Championship	Amee Kamani	0	1
World Snooker Championship	Vidya Pillai	0	1

- updated till 2023

=== List of National Sports award recipients in Billiards & Snooker, showing the year, award, and gender ===
Year	Recipient	Award	Gender
1992–1993	Geet Sethi	Rajiv Gandhi Khel Ratna	Male
2005	Pankaj Advani	Rajiv Gandhi Khel Ratna	Male
1962	Wilson Jones	Arjuna Award	Male
1970	Michael Ferreira	Arjuna Award	Male
1972	Satish Kumar Mohan	Arjuna Award	Male
1973	Shyam Shroff	Arjuna Award	Male
1978–1979	Arvind Savur	Arjuna Award	Male
1983	Subhash Agarwal	Arjuna Award	Male
1984	Omprakesh Agrawal	Arjuna Award	Male
1985	Geet Sethi	Arjuna Award	Male
1989	Yasin Merchant	Arjuna Award	Male
1997	Ashok Harishankar Shandilya	Arjuna Award	Male
2001	Devender Sreekant Joshi	Arjuna Award	Male
2002	Alok Kumar	Arjuna Award	Male
2003	Pankaj Advani	Arjuna Award	Male
2005	Anuja Thakur	Arjuna Award	Female
2012	Aditya Mehta	Arjuna Award	Male
2013	Rupesh Shah	Arjuna Award	Male
2016	Sourav Kothari	Arjuna Award	Male
2005	Manoj Kumar Kothari	Dhyan Chand Award	Male
1996	Wilson Jones	Dronacharya Award	Male
2001	Michael Ferreira	Dronacharya Award	Male
2004	Arvind Savur	Dronacharya Award	Male
2010	Subhash Agarwal	Dronacharya Award	Male
