= 2009 World Professional Billiards Championship =

The 2009 World Professional Billiards Championship, the top international professional competition in English billiards, was held between 2 and 6 September 2009 at the Northern Snooker Centre in Leeds, England. The 17 players were divided into three groups of four, and one group of five, with the top two in each group advancing into the knock-out round.

Pankaj Advani won his first World Professional Billiards Championship title after beating defending champion Mike Russell in the final 2030–1253.

== Group round ==
=== Group A ===
Player	Score	Player	Score
(Qatar) Mike Russell	945	(India) Rupesh Shah	215
(India) Devendra Joshi	615	(England) Ian Williamson	237
(Qatar) Mike Russell	889	(England) Ian Williamson	269
(India) Devendra Joshi	309	(India) Rupesh Shah	485
(England) Ian Williamson	249	(India) Rupesh Shah	480
(Qatar) Mike Russell	703	(India) Devendra Joshi	439

Rank	Player	P	W	L	F	A
1	(Qatar) Mike Russell	3	3	0	2537	919
2	(India) Rupesh Shah	3	2	1	1176	1503
3	(India) Devendra Joshi	3	1	2	1363	1425
4	(England) Ian Williamson	3	0	3	1176	1503

=== Group B ===
Player	Score	Player	Score
(India) Sourav Kothari	333	(India) B. Bhaskar	779
(England) Gary Rogers	171	(England) Martin Goodwill	654
(India) Sourav Kothari	394	(England) Martin Goodwill	413
(India) B. Bhaskar	529	(England) Gary Rogers	295
(England) Martin Goodwill	567	(India) B. Bhaskar	400
(India) Sourav Kothari	730	(England) Gary Rogers	317

Rank	Player	P	W	L	F	A
1	(England) Martin Goodwill	3	3	0	1634	965
2	(India) B. Bhaskar	3	2	1	1708	1195
3	(India) Sourav Kothari	3	1	2	1457	1509
4	(England) Gary Rogers	3	0	3	783	1913

=== Group C ===
Player	Score	Player	Score
(Singapore) Peter Gilchrist	927	(England) Bernard French	240
(England) Mark Hirst	513	(England) Bernard French	314
(Singapore) Peter Gilchrist	789	(England) Mark Hirst	471
(England) David Causier	982	(England) Bernard French	299
(England) David Causier	862	(England) Mark Hirst	332
(England) David Causier	982	(Singapore) Peter Gilchrist	467

Rank	Player	P	W	L	F	A
1	(England) David Causier	3	3	0	2826	1098
2	(Singapore) Peter Gilchrist	3	2	1	2183	1693
3	(England) Mark Hirst	3	1	2	1316	1965
4	(England) Bernard French	3	0	3	853	2422

=== Group D ===
Player	Score	Player	Score
(India) Geet Sethi	383	(India) Dhruv Sitwala	629
(India) Pankaj Advani	787	(England) Robert Hall	394
(India) Dhruv Sitwala	957	(Austria) Michael Kreuziger	154
(India) Geet Sethi	1329	(England) Robert Hall	206
(India) Pankaj Advani	1169	(Austria) Michael Kreuziger	159
(India) Dhruv Sitwala	1010	(England) Robert Hall	228
(India) Geet Sethi	1247	(Austria) Michael Kreuziger	185
(India) Pankaj Advani	495	(India) Dhruv Sitwala	731
(Austria) Michael Kreuziger	222	(England) Robert Hall	690
(India) Geet Sethi	482	(India) Pankaj Advani	818

Rank	Player	P	W	L	F	A
1	(India) Dhruv Sitwala	4	4	0	3327	1260
2	(India) Pankaj Advani	4	3	1	3269	1766
3	(India) Geet Sethi	4	2	2	3441	1838
4	(England) Robert Hall	4	1	3	1518	3348
5	(Austria) Michael Kreuziger	4	0	4	720	4063

== Knock-out round ==
Quarterfinals; 2½ hours		Semifinals; 4 hours		Final; 5 hours
(Qatar) Mike Russell	1271
(India) B. Bhaskar	419	(Qatar) Mike Russell	1366
(India) Rupesh Shah	545	(India) Rupesh Shah	880
(England) Martin Goodwill	394			(Qatar) Mike Russell	1253
(England) David Causier	782			(India) Pankaj Advani	2030
(India) Pankaj Advani	896	(India) Pankaj Advani	1037
(Singapore) Peter Gilchrist	399	(India) Dhruv Sitwala	972
(India) Dhruv Sitwala	872
