= 2011 World Billiards Championship =

The 2011 World Billiards Championship, the top international competition in English billiards, was held between 24 and 31 October 2011 at the Northern Snooker Centre in Leeds, England. The 34 players were divided six groups of four and two of five in first group stage, with the top two in each group advancing into the second group stage. The 16 players in the second group stage were divided into four groups of 4, with the top 2 reaching the knock-out round.

Mike Russell won his 11th World Billiards Championship title after beating David Causier 1500–558 in the final.

== Prize fund ==
- Winner: £6,000
- Runner-up: £2,750
- Semi-final: £1,500
- Quarter-final: £750
- Third in second group stage: £450
- Fourth in second group stage: £300
- Highest break: £250
- Total: £18,000

== First group stage ==
In the group stages all matches were up to 500 points.

=== Group A ===
Player	Score	Player	Score
(England) Mike Russell	500	(England) Bem French	133
(England) Phil Mumford	500	(England) John Hartley	366
(England) Bem French	398	(England) John Hartley	500
(England) Mike Russell	500	(England) Phil Mumford	485
(England) Phil Mumford	500	(England) Bem French	69
(England) Mike Russell	500	(England) John Hartley	88

Rank	Player	P	W	L	F	A
1	(England) Mike Russell	3	3	0	1500	706
2	(England) Phil Mumford	3	2	1	1485	935
3	(England) John Hartley	3	1	2	954	1398
4	(England) Bem French	3	0	3	600	1500

=== Group B ===
Player	Score	Player	Score
(India) Sourav Kothari	271	(Australia) Matthew Bolton	500
(England) Nalin Patel	500	(England) Robert Marshall	447
(Australia) Matthew Bolton	500	(England) Robert Marshall	249
(India) Sourav Kothari	500	(England) Nalin Patel	329
(England) Nalin Patel	151	(Australia) Matthew Bolton	500
(India) Sourav Kothari	500	(England) Robert Marshall	235

Rank	Player	P	W	L	F	A
1	(Australia) Matthew Bolton	3	3	0	1500	671
2	(India) Sourav Kothari	3	2	1	1271	1064
3	(England) Nalin Patel	3	1	2	980	1447
4	(England) Robert Marshall	3	0	3	931	1500

=== Group C ===
Player	Score	Player	Score
(India) Pankaj Advani	500	(England) Chris Taylor	63
(England) Matthew Sutton	500	(England) Jamie Barker	146
(India) Pankaj Advani	500	(England) Jamie Barker	172
(England) Chris Taylor	500	(Scotland) Calum Hossack	274
(India) Pankaj Advani	500	(Scotland) Calum Hossack	71
(England) Matthew Sutton	500	(England) Chris Taylor	372
(England) Jamie Barker	500	(Scotland) Calum Hossack	392
(India) Pankaj Advani	500	(England) Matthew Sutton	222
(England) Chris Taylor	500	(England) Jamie Barker	336
(England) Matthew Sutton	500	(Scotland) Calum Hossack	134

Rank	Player	P	W	L	F	A
1	(India) Pankaj Advani	4	4	0	2000	528
2	(England) Matthew Sutton	4	3	1	1722	1152
3	(England) Chris Taylor	4	2	2	1435	1610
4	(England) Jamie Barker	4	1	3	1154	1892
5	(Scotland) Calum Hossack	4	0	4	871	2000

=== Group D ===
Player	Score	Player	Score
(India) Balchandra Bhaskar	500	(India) Ashok Shandilya	0
(India) Geet Sethi	500	(Jersey) Guy Heys	106
(India) Geet Sethi	500	(India) Ashok Shandilya	0
(India) Balchandra Bhaskar	500	(Jersey) Guy Heys	115
(Jersey) Guy Heys	500	(India) Ashok Shandilya	0
(India) Geet Sethi	500	(India) Balchandra Bhaskar	172

Rank	Player	P	W	L	F	A
1	(India) Geet Sethi	3	3	0	1500	278
2	(India) Balchandra Bhaskar	3	2	1	1172	615
3	(Jersey) Guy Heys	3	1	2	721	1000
4	(India) Ashok Shandilya	3	0	3	0	1500

=== Group E ===
Player	Score	Player	Score
(England) David Causier	500	(India) Alok Kumar	266
(England) John Murphy	500	(England) Glen Blythman	100
(India) Alok Kumar	500	(England) Glen Blythman	149
(England) David Causier	500	(England) John Murphy	196
(England) John Murphy	241	(India) Alok Kumar	500
(England) David Causier	500	(England) Glen Blythman	0

Rank	Player	P	W	L	F	A
1	(England) David Causier	3	3	0	1500	462
2	(India) Alok Kumar	3	2	1	1266	890
3	(England) John Murphy	3	1	2	937	1100
4	(England) Glen Blythman	3	0	3	249	1500

=== Group F ===
Player	Score	Player	Score
(India) Rupesh Shah	500	(Australia) Neil Bolton	148
(India) Sushrut Pandia	418	(England) Gary Norman	500
(Australia) Neil Bolton	500	(England) Gary Norman	431
(India) Rupesh Shah	500	(India) Sushrut Pandia	45
(India) Sushrut Pandia	202	(Australia) Neil Bolton	500
(India) Rupesh Shah	500	(England) Gary Norman	181

Rank	Player	P	W	L	F	A
1	(India) Rupesh Shah	3	3	0	1500	374
2	(Australia) Neil Bolton	3	2	1	1148	1133
3	(England) Gary Norman	3	1	2	1112	1418
4	(India) Sushrut Pandia	3	0	3	665	1500

=== Group G ===
Player	Score	Player	Score
(Singapore) Peter Gilchrist	500	(England) Mark Hirst	106
(England) Rob Hall	500	(India) Manish Jain	491
(Singapore) Peter Gilchrist	500	(India) Manish Jain	132
(England) Mark Hirst	500	(England) Jason Devaney	241
(England) Rob Hall	500	(England) Mark Hirst	444
(Singapore) Peter Gilchrist	500	(England) Jason Devaney	79
(India) Manish Jain	500	(England) Jason Devaney	219
(Singapore) Peter Gilchrist	500	(England) Rob Hall	279
(England) Rob Hall	500	(England) Jason Devaney	151
(England) Mark Hirst	187	(India) Manish Jain	500

Rank	Player	P	W	L	F	A
1	(Singapore) Peter Gilchrist	4	4	0	2000	596
2	(England) Rob Hall	4	3	1	1779	1586
3	(India) Manish Jain	4	2	2	1623	1406
4	(England) Mark Hirst	4	1	3	1237	1741
5	(England) Jason Devaney	4	0	4	690	2000

=== Group H ===
Player	Score	Player	Score
(England) Brian Watson	147	(England) Billy Bousfield	500
(India) Dhruv Sitwala	462	(India) Devendra Joshi	500
(India) Dhruv Sitwala	500	(England) Billy Bousfield	426
(England) Brian Watson	104	(India) Devendra Joshi	500
(India) Devendra Joshi	500	(England) Billy Bousfield	182
(India) Dhruv Sitwala	500	(England) Brian Watson	160

Rank	Player	P	W	L	F	A
1	(India) Devendra Joshi	3	3	0	1500	748
2	(India) Dhruv Sitwala	3	2	1	1462	1086
3	(England) Billy Bousfield	3	1	2	1108	1147
4	(England) Brian Watson	3	0	3	411	1500

== Second group stage ==
In the group stages all matches were up to 750 points.

=== Group A ===
Player	Score	Player	Score
(India) Devendra Joshi	671	(England) Matthew Sutton	750
(India) Geet Sethi	750	(Australia) Neil Bolton	120
(India) Devendra Joshi	750	(Australia) Neil Bolton	159
(India) Geet Sethi	611	(England) Matthew Sutton	750
(England) Matthew Sutton	750	(Australia) Neil Bolton	319
(India) Geet Sethi	220	(India) Devendra Joshi	750

Rank	Player	P	W	L	F	A
1	(England) Matthew Sutton	3	3	0	2250	1601
2	(India) Devendra Joshi	3	2	1	2171	1129
3	(India) Geet Sethi	3	1	2	1581	1620
4	(Australia) Neil Bolton	3	0	3	598	2250

=== Group B ===
Player	Score	Player	Score
(England) Mike Russell	750	(England) Rob Hall	49
(India) Rupesh Shah	750	(India) Sourav Kothari	683
(England) Mike Russell	750	(India) Sourav Kothari	593
(India) Rupesh Shah	750	(England) Rob Hall	470
(England) Rob Hall	259	(India) Sourav Kothari	750
(India) Rupesh Shah	232	(England) Mike Russell	750

Rank	Player	P	W	L	F	A
1	(England) Mike Russell	3	3	0	2250	874
2	(India) Rupesh Shah	3	2	1	1732	1903
3	(India) Sourav Kothari	3	1	2	2026	1759
4	(England) Rob Hall	3	0	3	778	2250

=== Group C ===
Player	Score	Player	Score
(Australia) Matthew Bolton	750	(India) Balchandra Bhaskar	258
(India) Pankaj Advani	750	(India) Alok Kumar	416
(Australia) Matthew Bolton	750	(India) Alok Kumar	415
(India) Pankaj Advani	750	(India) Balchandra Bhaskar	463
(India) Balchandra Bhaskar	356	(India) Alok Kumar	750
(India) Pankaj Advani	750	(Australia) Matthew Bolton	154

Rank	Player	P	W	L	F	A
1	(India) Pankaj Advani	3	3	0	2250	1033
2	(Australia) Matthew Bolton	3	2	1	1654	1423
3	(India) Alok Kumar	3	1	2	1581	1856
4	(India) Balchandra Bhaskar	3	0	3	1077	2250

=== Group D ===
Player	Score	Player	Score
(England) David Causier	750	(England) Phil Mumford	268
(Singapore) Peter Gilchrist	750	(India) Dhruv Sitwala	220
(England) David Causier	750	(India) Dhruv Sitwala	453
(Singapore) Peter Gilchrist	419	(England) Phil Mumford	750
(England) Phil Mumford	312	(India) Dhruv Sitwala	750
(Singapore) Peter Gilchrist	750	(England) David Causier	490

Rank	Player	P	W	L	F	A
1	(England) David Causier	3	2	1	1990	1471
2	(Singapore) Peter Gilchrist	3	2	1	1919	1460
3	(India) Dhruv Sitwala	3	1	2	1423	1812
4	(England) Phil Mumford	3	1	2	1330	1812

== Knock-out stage ==
Quarter-finals; First to 1000 points
(India) Pankaj Advani	1000
(India) Devendra Joshi	721
(England) Mike Russell	1000
(Singapore) Peter Gilchrist	698
(England) David Causier	1000
(India) Rupesh Shah	455
(England) Matthew Sutton	482
(Australia) Matthew Bolton	1000

Semi-finals; First to 1250 points
(India) Pankaj Advani	1012
(England) Mike Russell	1250
(England) David Causier	1250
(Australia) Matthew Bolton	232

Final; First to 1500 points
(England) Mike Russell	1500
(England) David Causier	558
