= 2008 World Professional Billiards Championship =

The 2008 World Professional Billiards Championship, the top international professional competition in English billiards, was held between 23 and 27 July 2008 at the Northern Snooker Centre in Leeds, England. The 16 players were divided into four groups of four, with the top two in each group advancing into the knock-out round.

Mike Russell won his ninth World Professional Billiards Championship title after beating Geet Sethi 1821–1342 in the final.

== Group round ==
=== Group A ===
Player	Score	Player	Score
(England) Mike Russell	1,068	(Austria) Michael Kreuziger	147
(India) Devendra Joshi	720	(England) Gary Rogers	253
(England) Mike Russell	980	(England) Gary Rogers	207
(India) Devendra Joshi	809	(Austria) Michael Kreuziger	241
(England) Gary Rogers	301	(Austria) Michael Kreuziger	370
(England) Mike Russell	741	(India) Devendra Joshi	501

Rank	Player	P	W	L	F	A
1	(England) Mike Russell	3	3	0	2,789	885
2	(India) Devendra Joshi	3	2	1	2,030	1,235
3	(Austria) Michael Kreuziger	3	1	2	788	2,178
4	(England) Gary Rogers	3	0	3	761	2,070

=== Group B ===
Player	Score	Player	Score
(England) David Causier	918	(India) Sourav Kothari	308
(India) Dhruv Sitwala	378	(India) Sourav Kothari	561
(England) David Causier	858	(India) Dhruv Sitwala	533
(England) Paul Bennett	483	(India) Dhruv Sitwala	534
(England) Paul Bennett	488	(India) Sourav Kothari	541
(England) David Causier	706	(England) Paul Bennett	583

Rank	Player	P	W	L	F	A
1	(England) David Causier	3	3	0	2,482	1,418
2	(India) Saurav Kothari	3	2	1	1,404	1,784
3	(India) Dhruv Sitwala	3	1	2	1,445	1,902
4	(England) Paul Bennett	3	0	3	1,554	1,781

=== Group C ===
Player	Score	Player	Score
(India) Geet Sethi	671	(India) Rupesh Shah	459
(Singapore) Peter Gilchrist	945	(India) Alok Kumar	447
(India) Geet Sethi	887	(India) Alok Kumar	506
(Singapore) Peter Gilchrist	615	(India) Rupesh Shah	433
(India) Alok Kumar	533	(India) Rupesh Shah	744
(India) Geet Sethi	628	(Singapore) Peter Gilchrist	749

Rank	Player	P	W	L	F	A
1	(Singapore) Peter Gilchrist	3	3	0	2,309	1,508
2	(India) Geet Sethi	3	2	1	2,186	1,714
3	(India) Rupesh Shah	3	1	2	1,636	1,819
4	(India) Alok Kumar	3	0	3	1,486	2,576

=== Group D ===
Player	Score	Player	Score
(India) Pankaj Advani	742	(England) Ian Williamson	308
(England) Ian Williamson	607	(England) Mark Hirst	154
(India) Pankaj Advani	806	(England) Mark Hirst	472
(England) Chris Shutt	833	(England) Mark Hirst	392
(England) Chris Shutt	976	(England) Ian Williamson	405
(England) Chris Shutt	731	(India) Pankaj Advani	750

Rank	Player	P	W	L	F	A
1	(India) Pankaj Advani	3	3	0	2,258	1,511
2	(England) Chris Shutt	3	2	1	2,540	1,547
3	(England) Ian Williamson	3	1	2	1,320	1,872
4	(England) Mark Hirst	3	0	3	1,018	2,246

== Knock-out round ==
Quarterfinals; 2½ hours		Semifinals; 4 hours		Final; 5 hours
(England) Mike Russell	838
(India) Saurav Kothari	526	(England) Mike Russell	1,788
(England) David Causier	1,547	(England) David Causier	1,149
(India) Devendra Joshi	358			(England) Mike Russell	1,821
(Singapore) Peter Gilchrist	647			(India) Geet Sethi	1,342
(England) Chris Shutt	965	(England) Chris Shutt	1,293
(India) Pankaj Advani	713	(India) Geet Sethi	1,426
(India) Geet Sethi	960
