= ACBS English Billiards Asian Championships =

The ACBS English Billiards Asian Championships is an English Billiards tournament first held in 1986, and then from 2002. The event is hosted by the Asian Confederation of Billiards Sports (ACBS).

== Tournaments ==
Year	Location	Winner	Score	Runner-up
1986	Unknown	Geet Sethi	Unknown	
1987–2001: Not held
2002	Bangalore	Ashok Shandilya	5:4	Pankaj Advani
2003	Rangun	Devendra Joshi	unknown	Kyaw Oo
2004	Not held			
2005	Pune	Pankaj Advani	5:0	Praprut Chaithanasakun
2006	Teheran	Aung San Oo	5:0	Devendra Joshi
2007	Doha	Peter Gilchrist	5:2	Thawat Sujaritthurakarn
2008	Rangun	Pankaj Advani	5:4	Rupesh Shah
2009	Pune	Pankaj Advani	5:3	Peter Gilchrist
2010	Indore	Pankaj Advani	6:5	Peter Gilchrist
2011	Insel Kisch	Alok Kumar	6:0	Praprut Chaithanasakun
2012	Panaji	Pankaj Advani	6:3	Thailand Thawat Sujaritthurakarn
2013	Indore	Rupesh Shah	6:4	Alok Kumar
2014	Chandigarh	Sourav Kothari	6:3	Alok Kumar
2015	Peking	Dhruv Sitwala	6:3	Pankaj Advani
2016	Colombo	Dhruv Sitwala	6:2	Bhaskar Balachandra
2017	Chandigarh	Pankaj Advani	6:3	Sourav Kothari
2018	Rangun	Pankaj Advani	6:1	Bhaskar Balachandra
2019	Chandigarh	Nay Thway Oo	6:2	Praprut Chaithanasakun
2020	Not held (COVID-19-Pandemie)			
