= 2018 in cue sports =

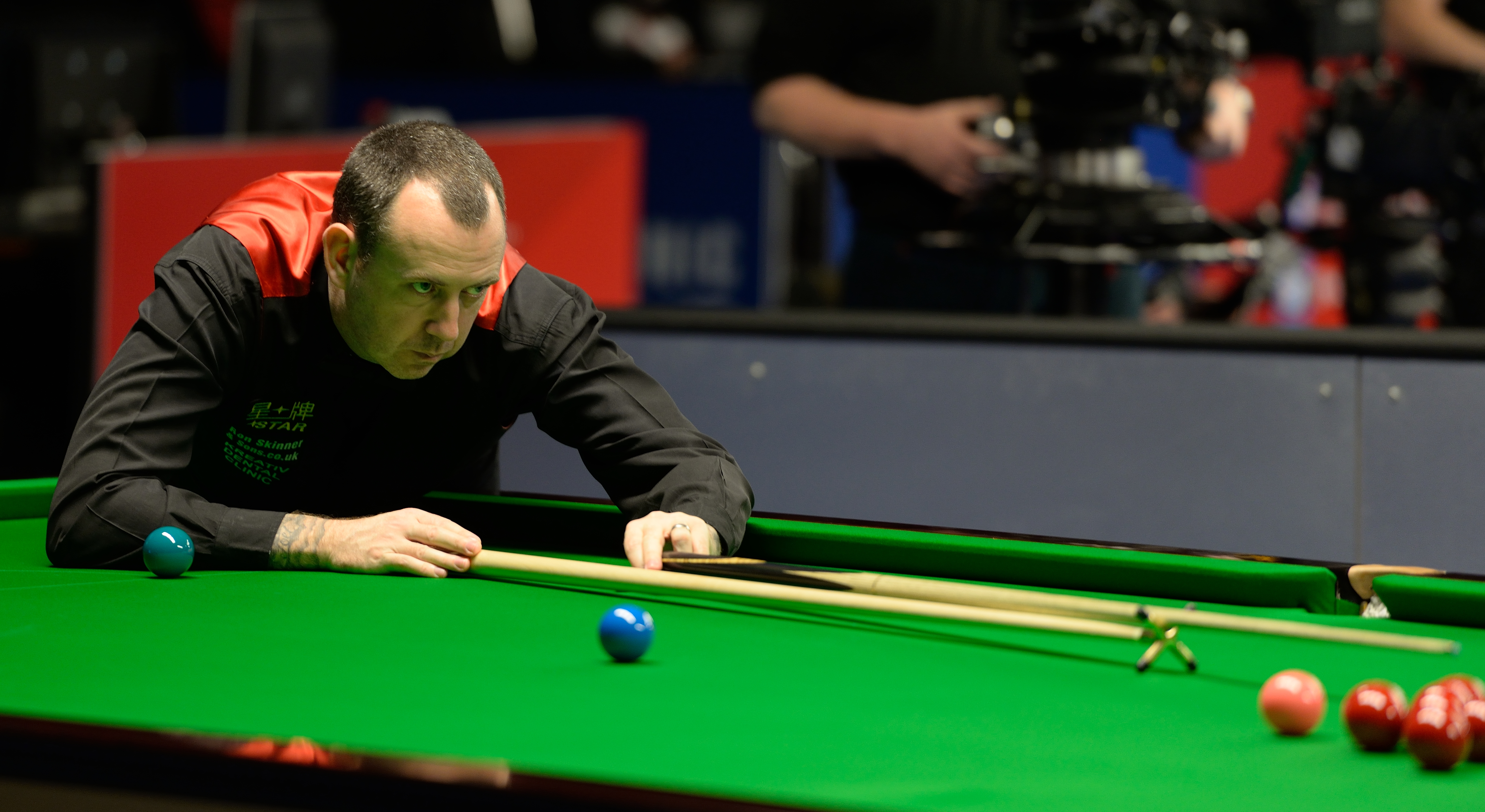
Mark Williams won his third World Snooker Championship in 2018.

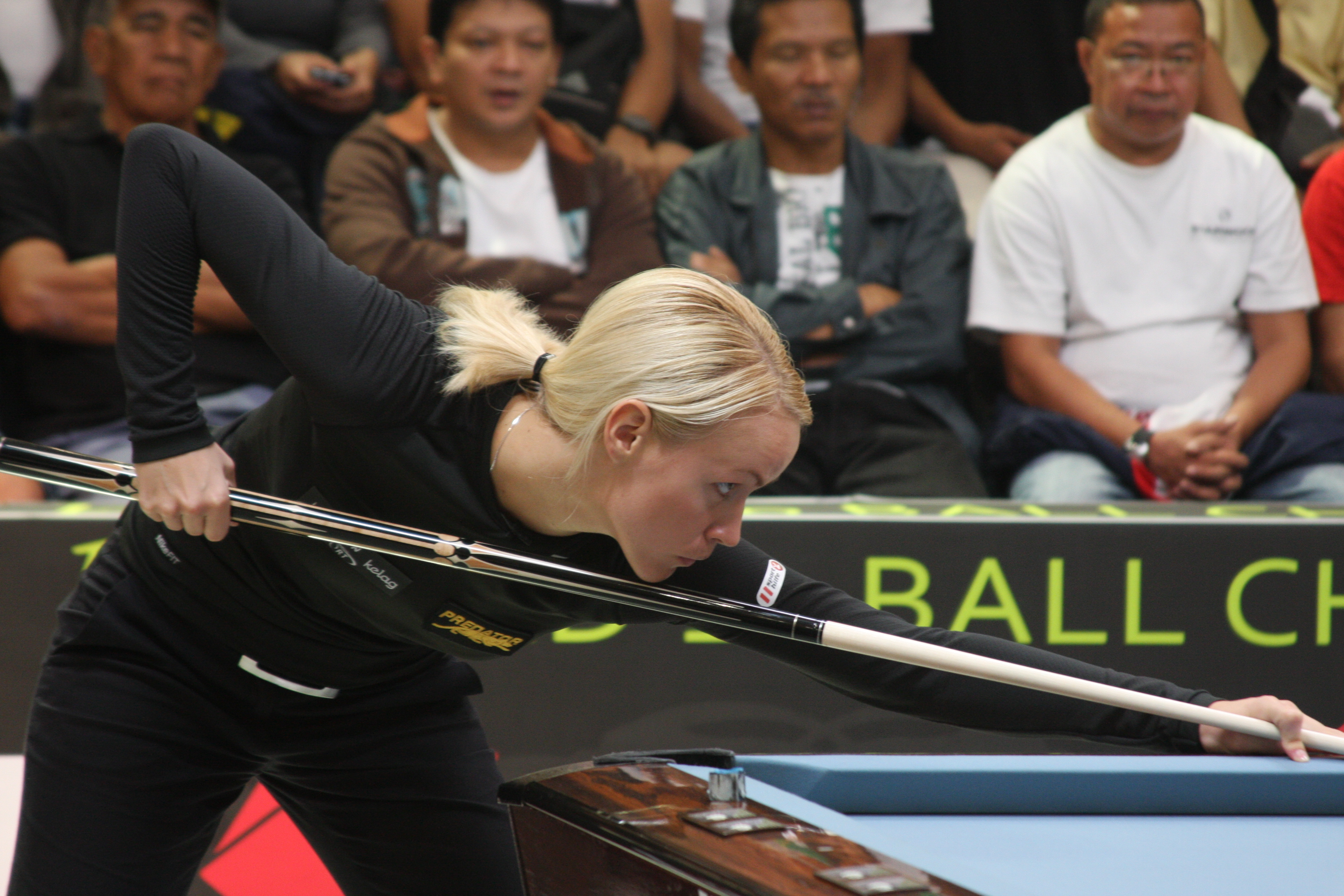
Jasmin Ouschan won three Euro Tour events in 2018.

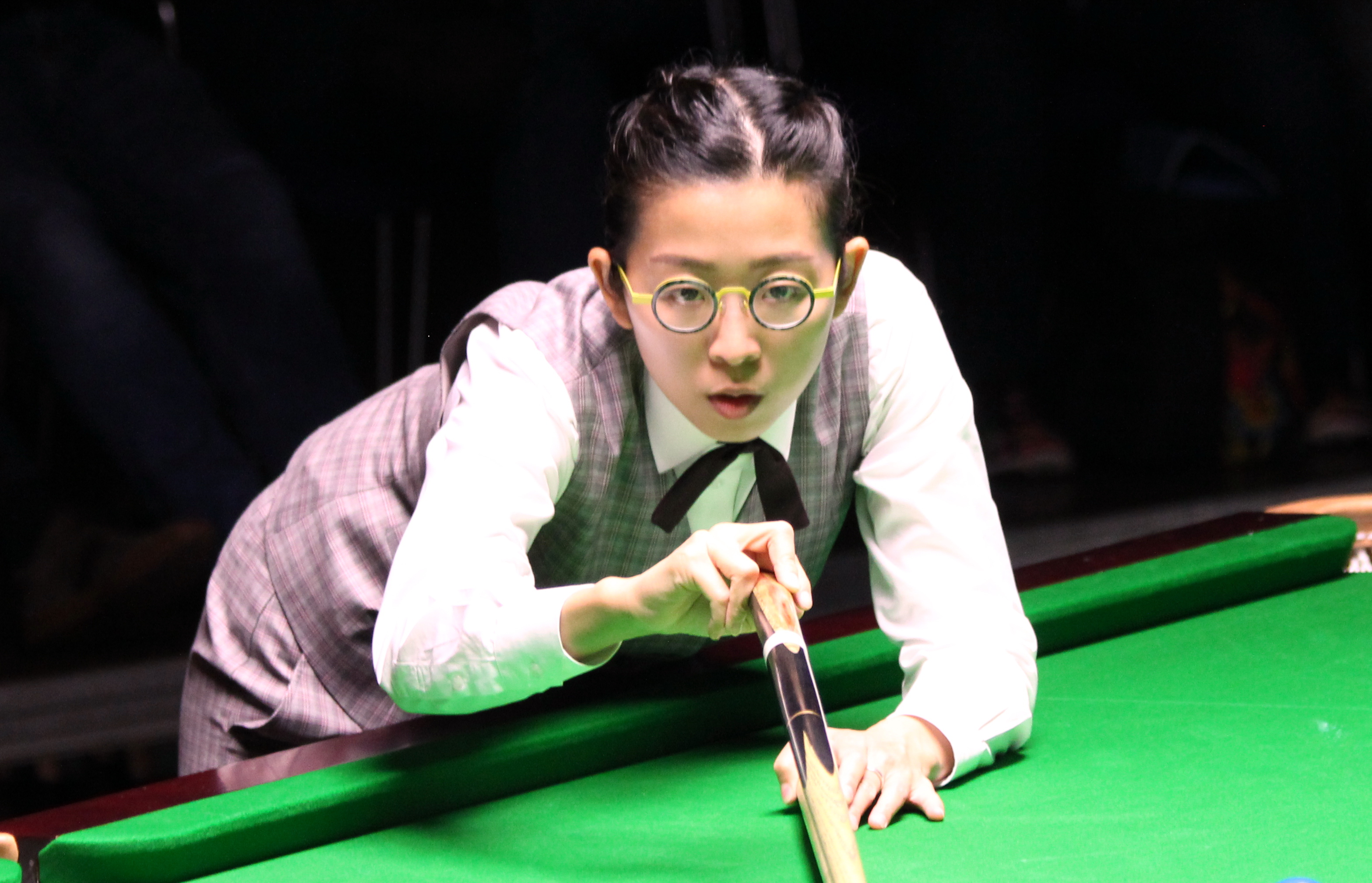
Ng On-yee won the 2018 World Women's Snooker Championship.

In 2018, championships were held across three continents to determine the best players in major cue sports, including snooker, pool, and English billiards. While these are mostly single player sports, some matches and tournaments are held as either doubles or as team events. The snooker season runs between May and April; the pool and billiards seasons run through the calendar year.

Four men's adult world championships were held in 2018, Mark Williams won the World Snooker Championship, Joshua Filler holding the WPA World Nine-ball Championship, Sourav Kothari the World Billiards Championship, and Dick Jaspers winning the UMB World Three-cushion Championship. Three women's world championships were also held, with Han Yu winning the WPA Women's World Nine-ball Championship, the World Billiards Championship being won by Emma Bonney and Ng On-yee winning the World Women's Snooker Championship.

The snooker Triple Crown featured Ronnie O'Sullivan winning the UK Championship, while the Masters was won by Mark Allen. In pool, the Mosconi Cup was won by the US team, with Skyler Woodward as the most valuable player. Peter Gilchrist won seven events in billiards, while Reanne Evans won six women's snooker events. The events below are professional and pro-am cue sports tournaments from the year of 2018, as well as select amateur snooker events used for qualification to the World Snooker Tour.

== Pool ==
The cue sport pool encapsulates several disciplines, such as straight pool, eight-ball, and nine-ball. Joshua Filler won the WPA World Nine-ball Championship, while the World Cup of Pool was won by China. In events where there was more than one competition, (m) refers to men, (f) to female, (s) to seniors and (u21) refers to under-21 competitions.

Pool Competitions
Date(s)	Tournament	Location	Result	Refs.
March 2–4	World Pool Masters	Gibraltar	Niels Feijen defeated Shane Van Boening, 8–4	
May 15–20	World Cup of Pool	China (Shanghai)	China A defeated Austria, 10–3	
July 19–31	European Pool Championships	Netherlands (Veldhoven)	Germany won 24 medals, ahead of Poland with 12	
September 11–15	Kremlin World Cup	Russia (Moscow)	Niels Feijen defeated Alexander Kazakis 8–7	
December 3–7	Mosconi Cup	England (London)	Team USA defeated Team Europe 11–9	
December 7–10	WPA Women's World Nine-ball Championship	Qatar (Doha)	Han Yu defeated Wang Xiaotong 5–0	
December 14–20	WPA World Nine-ball Championship	Qatar (Doha)	Joshua Filler defeated Carlo Biado 13–10	

=== Euro Tour ===
The Euro Tour is a professional nine-ball series run across Europe by the European Pocket Billiard Federation. The season featured seven events, with six tournaments for each gender.

Euro Tour pool competitions
Date(s)	Tournament	Location	Result	Refs.
March 1–4	Dynamic Billiard Treviso Open	Italy (Treviso)	Eklent Kaçi defeated Albin Ouschan 9–5 (m); Kristina Tkach defeated Marharyta Fefilava 7–0 (f)	
April 12–15	Sankt Johann im Pongau Open	Austria (St Johann im Pongau)	Alexander Kazakis defeated Denis Grabe 9–5 (m); Jasmin Ouschan defeated Marharyta Fefilava 7–2 (f)	
August 2–4	Veldhoven Open	Netherlands (Veldhoven)	Mario He defeated Eklent Kaçi 9–8 (m); Jasmin Ouschan defeated Oliwia Czuprynska 7–3 (f)	
September 20–23	Leende Open	Netherlands (Leende)	Shane Van Boening defeated Eklent Kaçi, 9–8	
September 22–22	Portugal Open	Portugal (Braga)	Kristina Tkach defeated Marharyta Fefilava 7–0	
October 11–14	Klagenfurt Open	Austria (Klagenfurt)	Mark Gray defeated Mario He, 9–8 (m); Jasmin Ouschan defeated Ana Gradišnik 7–4 (f)	
November 15–18	Treviso Open	Italy (Treviso)	Fedor Gorst defeated Mateusz Śniegocki, 9–7 (m); Kristina Tkach defeated Oliwia Czuprynska (f)	

== English billiards ==
The English billiards season ran from August to July. Sourav Kothari and Emma Bonney won the World Billiards Championships for each gender.

Billiards competitions
Date(s)	Tournament	Location	Result	Refs.
May 21–24	European Open	Ireland (Carlow)	Peter Gilchrist defeated David Causier 1083–911	
June 2–6	Asian Grand Prix	Singapore	Peter Gilchrist defeated Robert Hall 6–4	
June 12–15	ABSC Pacific International	Australia (Melbourne)	Robert Hall defeated Matthew Bolton 6–4	
October 22–26	World Billiards Championship	England (Leeds)	Sourav Kothari defeated Peter Gilchrist, 1134–944 (m); Emma Bonney defeated Rebecca Kenna 329–209 (f)	
November 12–18	IBSF World Billiards Championship (150-Up)	Myanmar (Yangon)	Pankaj Advani defeated Nay Thway Oo 6–2	
November 12–18	IBSF World Billiards Championship (Long-Up)	Myanmar (Yangon)	Pankaj Advani defeated Bhaskar Balachandra 1500–299	

=== World Billiards Open ===
World Billiards Open
Date(s)	Tournament	Location	Result	Refs.
January 27–28	Scottish Open	Scotland (Kirkcaldy)	Peter Gilchrist defeated Robert Marshall 521–265	
February 10–11	South Australian Open	Australia (Adelaide)	Peter Gilchrist defeated Steve Mifsud 1179–410	
March 30 – April 2	UK Open	England (Leeds)	Peter Gilchrist defeated Robert Hall 796–667	
April 6–8	Sydney Open	Australia (Sydney)	Peter Gilchrist defeated Michael Pearson 987–345	
April 28–29	English Open	England (Cambridge)	Robert Hall defeated Peter Gilchrist 614–378	
May 19–20	Irish Open	Ireland (Carlow)	Peter Gilchrist defeated David Causier 811–375	
August 18–19	NSC Open	England (Leeds)	David Causier defeated Robert Hall 749–198	

== Carom billiards ==
Three-cushion billiards competitions overseen by the Union Mondal de Billiard (UMB)

Union Mondiale de Billard competitions
Date(s)	Tournament	Location	Result	Refs.
February 22–25	World Three-cushion Teams Championship	Germany (Viersen)	Choi Sung-won & Kang Dong-koong defeated Arnim Kahofer & Andreas Efler 40–23	
September 18–20	World Three-cushion Women's Championship	Turkey (İzmir)	Therese Klompenhouwer defeated Orie Hida 30–24	
September 21–23	World Three-cushion Juniors Championship	Turkey (İzmir)	Cho Myung-woo defeated Jang Dae-hyun 35–18	
October 2–6	World Three-cushion Championship	Egypt (Cairo)	Dick Jaspers defeated Jérémy Bury with the best General average	
November 23–25	Lausanne Billiard Masters	Switzerland (Lausanne)	Eddy Merckx defeated Murat Naci Çoklu 40–33	

=== Three-Cushion World Cup ===
The Three-Cushion World Cup is an annual three-cushion series of tournaments hosted by the UMB. Seven events were held, with the overall winner being Frédéric Caudron.

Three-cushion World Cup events
Date(s)	Tournament	Location	Result	Refs.
April 23–29	Event one	Turkey (Antalya)	Winner: Frédéric Caudron, 2nd place: Murat Naci Çoklu, 3rd place: Cho Jae-ho & Dani Sánchez	
May 21–27	Event two	Viet Nam (Ho Chi Minh City)	Winner: Quyet Chien Tran, 2nd place: Dinh Nai Ngo, 3rd place: Nguyen Quoc Nguyen & Frédéric Caudron	
June 11–17	Event three	Belgium (Blankenberge)	Winner: Dick Jaspers, 2nd place: Semih Saygıner, 3rd place: Nikos Polychronopoulos & Eddy Merckx	
July 2–9	Event four	Portugal (Porto)	Winner: Frédéric Caudron, 2nd place: Tayfun Taşdemir, 3rd place: Choi Sung-won & Heo Jung-han	
October 22–28	Event five	France (La Baule)	Winner: Martin Horn, 2nd place: Cho Jae-ho, 3rd place: Frédéric Caudron & Semih Saygıner	
November 12–18	Event six	South Korea (Seoul)	Winner: Eddy Merckx, 2nd place: Filippos Kasidokostas, 3rd place: Dick Jaspers & Kim Bong-Chul	
December 2–8	Event seven	Egypt (Hurghada)	Winner: Dick Jaspers, 2nd place: Frédéric Caudron, 3rd place: Kim Haeng-jik & Semih Saygıner	

== Snooker ==
The World Snooker Tour season begins in July and ends in May. Mark Williams won his third World Snooker Championship by defeating John Higgins 18–16 in the final. Ng On-yee also won her third Women's World Snooker Championship with a 5–0 win over Maria Catalano in the final.

=== World ranking ===
World ranking snooker events
Date(s)	Tournament	Location	Result	Refs.
January 31 – February 4	German Masters	Germany (Berlin)	Mark Williams defeated Graeme Dott 9–1	
February 8–11	Snooker Shoot Out	England (Watford)	Michael Georgiou defeated Graeme Dott 67–56	
February 19–25	World Grand Prix	England (Preston)	Ronnie O'Sullivan defeated Ding Junhui 10–3	
February 26 – March 4	Welsh Open	Wales (Cardiff)	John Higgins defeated Barry Hawkins 9–7	
March 7–11	Gibraltar Open	Gibraltar	Ryan Day defeated Cao Yupeng 4–0	
March 19–25	Players Championship	Wales (Llandudno)	Ronnie O'Sullivan defeated Shaun Murphy 10–4	
April 2–8	China Open	China (Beijing)	Mark Selby defeated Barry Hawkins 11–3	
April 21 – May 7	World Snooker Championship	England (Sheffield)	Mark Williams defeated John Higgins 18–16	
July 27–29	Riga Masters	Latvia (Riga)	Neil Robertson defeated Jack Lisowski 5–2	
August 6–12	World Open	China (Yushan)	Mark Williams defeated David Gilbert 10–9	
August 22–26	Paul Hunter Classic	Germany (Fürth)	Kyren Wilson defeated Peter Ebdon 4–2	
September 24–30	China Championship	China (Guangzhou)	Mark Selby defeated John Higgins 10–9	
October 1–7	European Masters	Belgium (Lommel)	Jimmy Robertson defeated Joe Perry, 9–6	
October 15–21	English Open	England (Barnsley)	Stuart Bingham defeated Mark Davis 9–7	
October 28 – November 4	International Championship	China (Daqing)	Mark Allen defeated Neil Robertson 10–5	
November 12–18	Northern Ireland Open	Northern Ireland (Belfast)	Judd Trump defeated Ronnie O'Sullivan 9–8	
November 27 – December 9	UK Championship	England (York)	Ronnie O'Sullivan defeated Mark Allen 10–6	
December 10–16	Scottish Open	Scotland (Glasgow)	Mark Allen defeated Shaun Murphy 9–7	

=== Non-ranking ===
Non-ranking snooker competitions
Date(s)	Tournament	Location	Result	Refs.
January 14–21	Masters	England (London)	Mark Allen defeated Kyren Wilson 10–7	
March 14–18	Romanian Masters	Romania (Bucharest)	Ryan Day defeated Stuart Bingham 6–5	
January 22 – March 29	Championship League	England (Coventry)	John Higgins defeated Zhou Yuelong 3–2	
May 10–13	Vienna Snooker Open	Italy (Vienna)	Michael Georgiou defeated Ross Muir 5–4	
July 12–15	Golden Q Cup	Romania (Baia Mare)	Luca Brecel defeated Michael Georgiou 5–1	
July 28–31	Pink Ribbon	England (Gloucester)	Andrew Norman defeated Harvey Chandler 4–2	
July 31 – August 4	Haining Open	China (Haining)	Mark Selby defeats Li Hang 5–4	
September 10–16	Shanghai Masters	China (Shanghai)	Ronnie O'Sullivan defeated Barry Hawkins 11–9	
November 5–11	Champion of Champions	England (Coventry)	Ronnie O'Sullivan defeated Kyren Wilson 10–9	

=== Challenge Tour ===
The Challenge Tour is a secondary non-professional snooker tour with events for invited players. Eight tournaments were played from the ten events in the 2018–19 season in 2018.

Challenge Tour snooker events
Date(s)	Tournament	Location	Result	Refs.
June 3	Challenge Tour 1	England (Burton)	Brandon Sargeant defeated Luke Simmonds 3–1	
July 11	Challenge Tour 2	England (Preston)	David Grace defeated Mitchell Mann 3–0	
July 28	Challenge Tour 3	Latvia (Riga)	Barry Pinches defeated Jackson Page 3–2	
August 28	Challenge Tour 4	Germany (Fürth)	Mitchell Mann defeated Dylan Emery 3–0	
September 19	Challenge Tour 5	England (Derby)	David Lilley defeated Brandon Sargeant 3–1	
October 5	Challenge Tour 6	Belgium (Lommel)	David Grace defeated Ben Hancorn 3–0	
October 14	Challenge Tour 7	England (Preston)	Joel Walker defeated Jenson Kendrick 3–0	
November 25	Challenge Tour 8	Hungary (Budapest)	Simon Bedford defeated David Lilley 3–1	

=== World Seniors Tour ===
The World Seniors Tour is an amateur series open to players aged 40 and over. There were four events in the 2018 World Seniors Tour. The World Seniors Championship was won by Aaron Canavan.

Competitions on the World Snooker Tour
Date(s)	Tournament	Location	Result	Refs.
January 6–7	Seniors Irish Masters	Ireland (Kildare)	Steve Davis defeated Jonathan Bagley 4–0	
March 21–24	World Seniors Championship	England (Scunthorpe)	Aaron Canavan defeated Patrick Wallace 4–3	
April 12	Seniors Masters	England (Sheffield)	Cliff Thorburn defeated Jonathan Bagley 2–1	
October 24–25	UK Seniors Championship	England (Hull)	Ken Doherty defeated Igor Figueiredo 4–1	

=== Women's snooker ===
Women's snooker competitions
Date(s)	Tournament	Location	Result	Refs.
February 17–18	British Open	England (Stourbridge)	Reanne Evans defeated Nutcharut Wongharuthai 4–0	
March 14–17	World Women's Snooker Championship	Malta (St. Paul's Bay)	Ng On Yee defeated Maria Catalano 5–0	
April 13–16	World Women's Under-21 Championship	England (Leeds)	Nutcharut Wongharuthai defeated Emma Parker 3–0	
April 13–16	World Women's Seniors Championship	England (Leeds)	Jenny Poulter defeated Jackie Ellis 3–0	
April 13–16	World Women's 10-Red Championship	England (Leeds)	Reanne Evans defeated Ng On Yee 4–1	
April 13–16	World Women's 6-Red Championship	England (Leeds)	Reanne Evans defeated Ng On Yee 4–3	
April 13–16	World Women's Pairs Championship	England (Leeds)	Reanne Evans & Maria Catalano defeated Laura Evans & Suzie Opacic 3–0	
September 15–16	UK Women's Championship	England (Leeds)	Ng On-yee defeated Rebecca Kenna 4–1	
October 5–7	European Women's Masters	Belgium (Neerpelt)	Reanne Evans defeated Nutcharut Wongharuthai 4–1	
October 25–28	Australian Women's Open	Australia (Sydney)	Ng On-yee defeated Katrina Wan 4–2	
November 24–25	Eden Women's Masters	England (Gloucester)	Reanne Evans defeated Rebecca Kenna 4–0	
December 13–16	IBSF World Team Championship	Egypt (Marsa Alam)	Waratthanun Sukritthanes and Siripaporn Nuanthakhamjan defeated Amee Kamani and Vidya Pillai 4–2	

=== Amateur snooker championships ===
Amateur snooker competitions
Date(s)	Tournament	Location	Result	Refs.
February 2–16	European Under-18 Championships	Bulgaria (Sofia)	Jackson Page defeated Florian Nüßle 5–3	
February 2–16	European Under-21 Championships	Bulgaria (Sofia)	Simon Lichtenberg defeated Tyler Rees 6–3	
February 2–16	European Men's Championships	Bulgaria (Sofia)	Harvey Chandler defeated Jordan Brown 7–2	
February 27 – March 2	World Snooker Team Cup	Qatar (Doha)	Pankaj Advani & Manan Chandra defeated Muhammad Asif & Babar Masih 3–2	
March 7–17	Oceania Billiards & Snooker Championships	Australia (Mount Pritchard)	Adrian Ridley defeated Dennis Paul 6–4 (m); Mario Hidred defeated Adam Lilley 6–5 (u21); Carly Tait defeated Megan Fullerton 4–2 (f)	
March 14–24	WSF Championship	Malta (St. Paul's Bay)	Igor Figueiredo defeated Darren Morgan 5–3 (s); Luo Honghao defeated Adam Stefanów 6–0 (m)	
March 18–24	ACBS Asian Snooker Championship	Myanmar (Yangon)	Aung Phyo defeated Haris Tahir 6–4 (u21)	
March 18–24	ACBS Asian Snooker Championship	Myanmar (Yangon)	Amee Kamani defeated Siripaporn Nuanthakhamjan 3–0 (f)	
May 4–12	ABSF African Snooker Championships	Egypt (Cairo)	Mohamed Ibrahim defeated Mostafa Dorgham 6–1	
May 6–12	ACBS Asian Snooker Championship	Iran (Tabriz)	Amir Sarkhosh defeated Ali Ghareghouzlo 6–1	
July 2–10	IBSF World Under-21 Snooker Championship	China (Jinan)	Wu Yize defeated Pongsakorn Chongjairak 6–4 (m); Nutcharut Wongharuthai defeated Bai Yulu 4–2 (f)	
July 2–10	IBSF World Under-18 Championship	China (Jinan)	He Guoqiang defeated Lei Peifan 5–4	
November 19–27	IBSF World Men's Championship	Myanmar (Yangon)	Chang Bingyu defeated He Guoqiang 8–3 (m)	
November 19–27	IBSF World Women's Championship	Myanmar (Yangon)	Waratthanun Sukritthanes defeated Wendy Jans 5–2	
November 19–27	IBSF World Seniors Championship	Myanmar (Yangon)	Darren Morgan defeated Saleh Mohammed 6–0 (s)	
