= 2019 in cue sports =

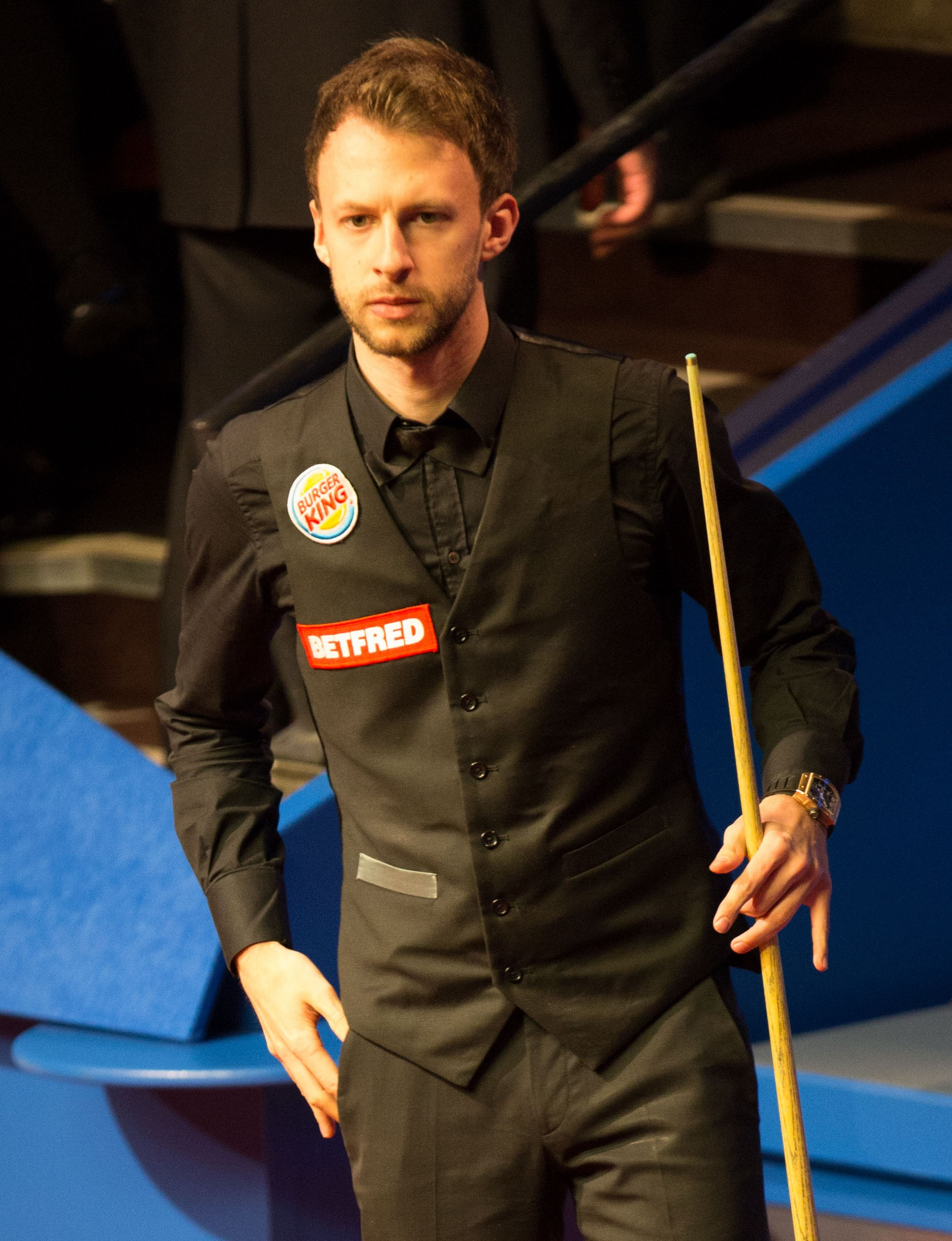
Judd Trump (pictured in 2015) won the 2019 World Snooker Championship defeating John Higgins 18–9

The year of 2019 included professional tournaments surrounding table-top cue sports. These events include snooker, pool disciplines and billiards. Whilst these are traditionally singles sports, some matches and tournaments are held as doubles, or team events. The snooker season runs between May and April, whilst the pool and billiards seasons run in the calendar year.

Four men's adult world championships were held in 2019, with Judd Trump winning the World Snooker Championship, Ko Ping-chung winning the WPA World Ten-ball Championship, nine-ball by Fedor Gorst and the World Billiards Championship by Peter Gilchrist respectively. Women's world championships featured a World Snooker Championship won by Reanne Evans and the World Billiards Championship won by Anna Lynch. The events in this list are professional, pro–am, or notable amateur cue sports tournaments from the year of 2019.

== Pool ==
The cue sport pool encapsulates several disciplines, such as straight pool and nine-ball. Ko Ping-chung won the WPA World Ten-ball Championship, whilst the World Cup of Pool was won by Austria. In events where there was more than one competition, (m) refers to men, (f) to women, and (w) to a wheelchair competition.

Date(s)	Tournament	Location	Result	Refs.
19–22 January	World Pool Series (Grand Final)	USA (Astoria)	Joshua Filler defeated Ralf Souquet, 17–11	
11–12 March	World Team Trophy	France (Roissy)	Winners: Europe (Frédéric Caudron, Joshua Filler, Kyren Wilson) (m); Asia (Sruong Pheavy, Kim Ga-young, Amee Kamani) (f)	
29–31 March	World Pool Masters	Gibraltar	David Alcaide defeated Alexander Kazakis, 9–8	
16–19 April	WPA Players Championship	USA (Las Vegas)	Cheng Yu-hsuan defeated Carlo Biado 12–11	
27 April–7 May	European Pool Championship	Italy (Treviso)	Straight pool – Karol Skowerski (m) / Kristina Tkach (w); Eight-ball – Eklent Kaçi (m) / Kristina Tkach (f) / Jouni Tähti (w); Nine-ball – Fedor Gorst (m) / Jasmin Ouschan (f) / Jouni Tähti (w); Ten-ball – Mieszko Fortuński (m) / Christine Feldmann (f) / Henrik Larsson (w); Team event – Spain (m) / Portugal (f)	
25–30 June	World Cup of Pool	England (Leicester)	Austria defeated Philippines 11–3	
22–26 July	WPA World Ten-ball Championship	USA (Las Vegas)	Ko Ping-chung defeated Joshua Filler 10–7	
17–21 September	Kremlin World Cup	Russia (Moscow)	Tyler Styler defeated David Alcaide 8–7	
25–28 November	Mosconi Cup	USA (Las Vegas)	Team USA defeated Team Europe 11–8	
3–12 December	WPA World Nine-ball Championship	Qatar (Doha)	Fedor Gorst defeated Chang Jung-lin 13–11	

=== Euro Tour ===
The Euro Tour is a professional nine-ball series run across Europe by the European Pocket Billiard Federation. The season featured six events, with five women's tournaments.

Date(s)	Tournament	Location	Result	Refs.
7–10 February	Leende Open	Netherlands (Leende)	Joshua Filler defeated Ruslan Chinakhov, 9–7	
9–11 May	Treviso Open	Italy (Treviso)	Konrad Juszczyszyn defeated Ivar Saris 9–6 (m); Kristina Tkach defeated Marharyta Fjafilawa 7–1 (f)	
13–16 June	Sankt Johann Im Pongau Open	Austria (St Johann im Pongau)	Eklent Kaçi defeated Joshua Filler 9–6 (m); Jasmin Ouschan defeated Marharyta Fjafilawa 7–1 (f)	
1–4 August	Veldhoven Open	Netherlands (Veldhoven)	Mario He defeated Denis Grabe 9–2 (m); Jasmin Ouschan defeated Melanie Suessenguth 7–4 (f)	
10–13 October	Klagenfurt Open	Austria (Klagenfurt)	Alexander Kazakis defeated Marc Bijsterbosch 9–8 (m); Oliwia Czuprynska defeated Marharyta Fjafilawa 7–5 (f)	
7–10 November	Antalya Open	Turkey (Antalya)	Denis Grabe defeated Eklent Kaçi 9–2 (m); Oliwia Zalewska defeated Tina Vogelmann 7–6 (f)	

=== Women's pool ===
Date(s)	Tournament	Location	Result	Refs.
24–28 June	WEPF World Eightball Championship	UK (Blackpool)	Amy Beauchamp defeated Sharon James 8–5	
15–19 December	WPA Women's World Nine-ball Championship	China (Sanya)	Kelly Fisher defeated Jasmin Ouschan	

=== Southeast Asian Games ===
Date(s)	Tournament	Location	Result	Refs.
3–10 December	Nine-ball singles	Philippines (Manila)	Phone Myint Kyaw defeated Đỗ Thế Kiên 9–4 (m); Rubilen Amit defeated Chezka Centeno 7–3 (f)	
3–10 December	Nine-ball doubles	Philippines (Manila)	Phone Myint Kyaw and Aung Moe Thu defeated Toh Lian Han and Aloysius Yapp 9–4 (m); Rubilen Amit and Chezka Centeno defeated Fathrah Masum and Nony Andilah 7–0 (f)	
3–10 December	Ten-ball singles	Philippines (Manila)	Dennis Orcollo defeated Đỗ Thế Kiên 9–8 (m); Chezka Centeno defeated Rubilen Amit 7–3 (f)	

== English billiards ==
The 2018–2019 English billiards season started at the end of August 2018. David Causier won the World Matchplay Championship, defeating Peter Gilchrist in the final 8–7. The 2019–2020 season started in September 2019, with Peter Gilchrist and Anna Lynch winning the World Billiards Championship titles in October 2019.

Date(s)	Tournament	Location	Result	Refs.
22–26 April	World Matchplay Billiards Championship	England (Leeds)	David Causier defeated Peter Gilchrist, 8–7	
20–22 May	European Open	Ireland (Carlow)	David Causier defeated Martin Goodwill, 1217–606.	
27–31 May	Pan-Am Cup	Canada (Winnipeg)	Peter Gilchrist defeated Dhruv Sitwala, 1500–507	
11–14 June	Pacific International	Australia (Melbourne)	Peter Gilchrist defeated Sourav Kothari, 1500–706	
18 July	Hi-End Open Billiards	Thailand (Bangkok)	Peter Gilchrist defeated Matthew Bolton, 1148–436	
8–12 Oct 2019	World Billiards Championship	England (Leeds)	Peter Gilchrist defeated Sourav Kothari, 1307–967 (m); Anna Lynch defeated Judy Dangerfield, 244–204 (f)	

=== Southeast Asian Games ===
Date(s)	Tournament	Location	Result	Refs.
3–10 December	English billiards	Philippines (Manila)	Peter Gilchrist defeated Nay Thway Oo 3–0	
3–10 December	One-Cushion	Philippines (Manila)	Ngô Đình Nại defeated Phạm Cảnh Phúc 100–92	

== Snooker ==
The World Snooker season begins in July, and ends in May. Judd Trump won his first World Snooker Championship, defeating four-time champion John Higgins in the final. Reanne Evans won the women's world championship, defeating Nutcharut Wongharuthai in the final 6–3.

=== World ranking events ===
Date(s)	Tournament	Location	Result	Refs.
30 January – 3 February	German Masters	Germany (Berlin)	Kyren Wilson defeated David Gilbert, 9–7	
4–10 February	World Grand Prix	England (Cheltenham)	Judd Trump defeated Ali Carter, 10–6.	
11–17 February	Welsh Open	Wales (Cardiff)	Neil Robertson defeated Stuart Bingham, 9–7	
21–24 February	Snooker Shoot Out	England (Watford)	Thepchaiya Un-Nooh defeated Michael Holt, 1–0	
27 February – 3 March	Indian Open	India (Kochi)	Matthew Selt defeated Lyu Haotian, 5–3	
6–10 March	Players Championship	England (Preston)	Ronnie O'Sullivan defeated Neil Robertson, 10–4	
15–17 March	Gibraltar Open	Gibraltar	Stuart Bingham defeated Ryan Day, 4–1	
19–24 March	Tour Championship	Wales (Llandudno)	Ronnie O'Sullivan defeated Neil Robertson, 13–11	
1–7 April	China Open	China (Beijing)	Neil Robertson defeated Jack Lisowski, 11–4	
20 April – 6 May	World Snooker Championship	England (Sheffield)	Judd Trump defeated John Higgins, 18–9	
26–28 July	Riga Masters	Latvia (Riga)	Yan Bingtao defeated Mark Joyce, 5–2	
4–11 August	International Championship	China (Daqing)	Judd Trump defeated Shaun Murphy, 10–3	
23–29 September	China Championship	China (Guangzhou)	Shaun Murphy defeated Mark Williams, 10–9	
14–20 October	English Open	England (Crawley)	Mark Selby defeated David Gilbert, 9–1	
28 October – 3 November	World Open	China (Yushan)	Judd Trump defeated Thepchaiya Un-Nooh, 10–5	
11–17 November	Northern Ireland Open	Northern Ireland (Belfast)	Judd Trump defeated Ronnie O'Sullivan, 9–7	
26 November – 8 December	UK Championship	England (York)	Ding Junhui defeated Stephen Maguire, 10–6	
9–15 December	Scottish Open	Scotland (Glasgow)	Mark Selby defeated Jack Lisowski, 9–6	

==== Challenge Tour ====
The Challenge Tour was a secondary non-professional snooker tour with events for invited players.

Date(s)	Tournament	Location	Result	Refs.
26–27 January	Challenge Tour 9	England (Sheffield)	Adam Duffy defeated Matthew Glasby, 3–1	
6–7 March	Challenge Tour 10	England (Gloucester)	George Pragnall defeated Callum Lloyd, 3–2	
31 August – 1 September	Challenge Tour 1	Germany (Nuremberg)	Cheung Ka Wai defeated Oliver Brown, 3–1	
21–22 September	Challenge Tour 2	Belgium (Bruges)	Ashley Hugill defeated Aaron Hill, 3–1	
5–6 October	Challenge Tour 3	England (Leeds)	Andrew Pagett defeated Robbie McGuigan, 3–0	
19–20 October	Challenge Tour 4	Belgium (Bruges)	Ashley Hugill defeated Aaron Hill, 3–1	

==== Non-ranking events ====
Date(s)	Tournament	Location	Result	Refs.
13–20 January	The Masters	England (London)	Judd Trump defeated Ronnie O'Sullivan, 10–4	
1 January – 14 March	Championship League	England (Coventry and Barnsley)	Martin Gould defeated Jack Lisowski, 3–1	
24–25 August	Paul Hunter Classic	Germany (Fürth)	Barry Hawkins defeated Kyren Wilson, 4–3	
9–15 September	Shanghai Masters	China (Shanghai)	Ronnie O'Sullivan defeated Shaun Murphy, 11–9	
22–26 October	Haining Open	China (Haining)	Thepchaiya Un-Nooh defeated Li Hang, 5–3	
4–10 November	Champion of Champions	England (Coventry)	Neil Robertson defeated Judd Trump, 10–9	

===== Pro–am events =====
Two events in 2019 were denoted as pro–am, with the events open to specific professional and local amateur players.

Date(s)	Tournament	Location	Result	Refs.
9–13 May	Vienna Snooker Open	Austria (Vienna)	Mark Joyce defeated Mark King, 5–4	
20–23 July	Pink Ribbon	England (Gloucester)	Stuart Bingham defeated Mark Allen, 4–3	

==== Team event ====
Date(s)	Tournament	Location	Result	Refs.
24–30 June	World Cup	China (Wuxi)	Scotland defeated China, 4–0	

==== Variant events ====
Date(s)	Tournament	Location	Result	Refs.
2–7 September	Six-red World Championship	Thailand (Bangkok)	Stephen Maguire defeated John Higgins, 8–6	

=== World Seniors Tour ===
The World Seniors Tour is an amateur series open to players aged 40 and over. There were four events in the 2019 World Seniors Tour.

Date(s)	Tournament	Location	Result	Refs.
4–6 January	Seniors Irish Masters	Ireland (Kill)	Jimmy White defeated Rodney Goggins, 4–1	
3 March	Seniors 6-Red World Championship	Northern Ireland (Belfast)	Jimmy White defeated Aaron Canavan, 4–2	
11 April	Seniors Masters	England (Sheffield)	Joe Johnson defeated Barry Pinches, 2–1	
24-25 October	UK Seniors Championship	England (Hull)	Michael Judge defeated Jimmy White, 4–2	

=== Women's snooker ===
Date(s)	Tournament	Location	Result	Refs.
1–3 February	Belgian Women's Open	Belgium (Bruges)	Reanne Evans defeated Ng On-yee, 4–1	
12–15 April	Festival of Women's Snooker	England (Leeds)	World Six-red Championship: Reanne Evans defeated Nutcharut Wongharuthai, 4–1; World Ten-red Championship: Reanne Evans defeated Ng On-yee, 4–3; World Under-21 Championship: Ploychompoo Laokiatphong defeated Nutcharut Wongharuthai, 3–1; World Seniors Championship: Jenny Poulter defeated Jan Hughes, 2–0	
20–23 June	World Women's Snooker Championship	Thailand (Bangkok)	Reanne Evans defeated Nutcharut Wongharuthai, 6–3	
17 August	Women's Tour Championship	England (Sheffield)	Reanne Evans defeated Ng On-yee, 1–0	
15–17 September	UK Women's Championship	England (Leeds)	Reanne Evans defeated Maria Catalano, 4–2	
15–21 September	IBSF Six-red Championship	Myanmar (Mandalay)	Nutcharut Wongharuthai defeated Amee Kamani, 4–2	
17–20 October	Australian Women's Snooker Open	Australia (Sydney)	Nutcharut Wongharuthai defeated Ng On-yee, 4–2	
29 October – 9 November	IBSF World Snooker Championship	Turkey (Antalya)	Ng On-yee defeated Nutcharut Wongharuthai, 5–2	
23–24 November	Eden Women's Masters	England (Gloucester)	Reanne Evans defeated Ng On-yee, 4–2	

=== Amateur snooker championships ===
Date(s)	Tournament	Location	Result	Refs.
6–15 January	Qatar Six-red World Cup	Qatar (Doha)	Amir Sarkhosh defeated Thanawat Thirapongpaiboon, 7–6	
16–19 January	Nordic Snooker Championship	Sweden (Stockholm)	Daniel Kandi defeated Patrik Tiihonen, 5–4	
30 January – 3 February	Pan American Snooker Championship	USA (Houston)	Igor Figueiredo defeated Renat Denkha, 6–1	
17 February – 2 March	EBSA European Individual Snooker Championships	Israel (Eilat)	U18: Aaron Hill defeated Dylan Emery, 4–3. U21: Jackson Page defeated Ross Bulman, 5–1. Senior: Kacper Filipiak defeated David Lilley, 5–4	
14–17 March	Oceania Snooker Championship	Australia (Mount Pritchard)	Steve Mifsud defeated Kurt Dunham, 6–4	
29 May – 9 June	European Snooker Championships	Serbia (Belgrade)	Open: Kristján Helgason defeated Francisco Sánchez Ruiz, 4–1. Ladies: Diana Stateczny defeated Anastasia Nechaeva, 4–2; 6red: Alex Callaewert defeated Paweł Rogoza, 5–4; Masters: Darren Morgan defeated Alan Trigg, 4–2; Team: Wales 1 defeated England 1, 4–2.	
17–21 June	Asian Snooker Championship	India (Bengaluru)	Pankaj Advani defeated Thanawat Tirapongpaiboon, 6–3	
20–24 August	2019 African Games	Morocco (Casablanca)	Men: Amine Amiri defeated Abdulraham Haridi, 4–3. Ladies: Yousra Matine defeated Ganton Askiri; Mixed Doubles: Yassine Bellamine and Hakima Kissai defeated Amine Amiri and Yousra Matine	
29 October – 9 November	IBSF World Snooker Championship	Turkey (Antalya)	Muhammad Asif defeated Jefrey Roda, 8–5	
3–10 December	Southeast Asian Games singles	Philippines (Manila)	Kritsanut Lertsattayathorn defeated Moh Keen Hoo 4–2	
3–10 December	Southeast Asian Games doubles	Philippines (Manila)	Moh Keen Hoo and Kok Leong Lim defeated Alvin Barbero and Jefrey Roda 3–1	
