= List of UK Open Billiards Championship winners =

UK Open Billiards Championship
Tournament information
- Established: 1934
- Organisation(s): World Billiards
- Recent edition: 2026
- Current champion: David Causier (ENG)

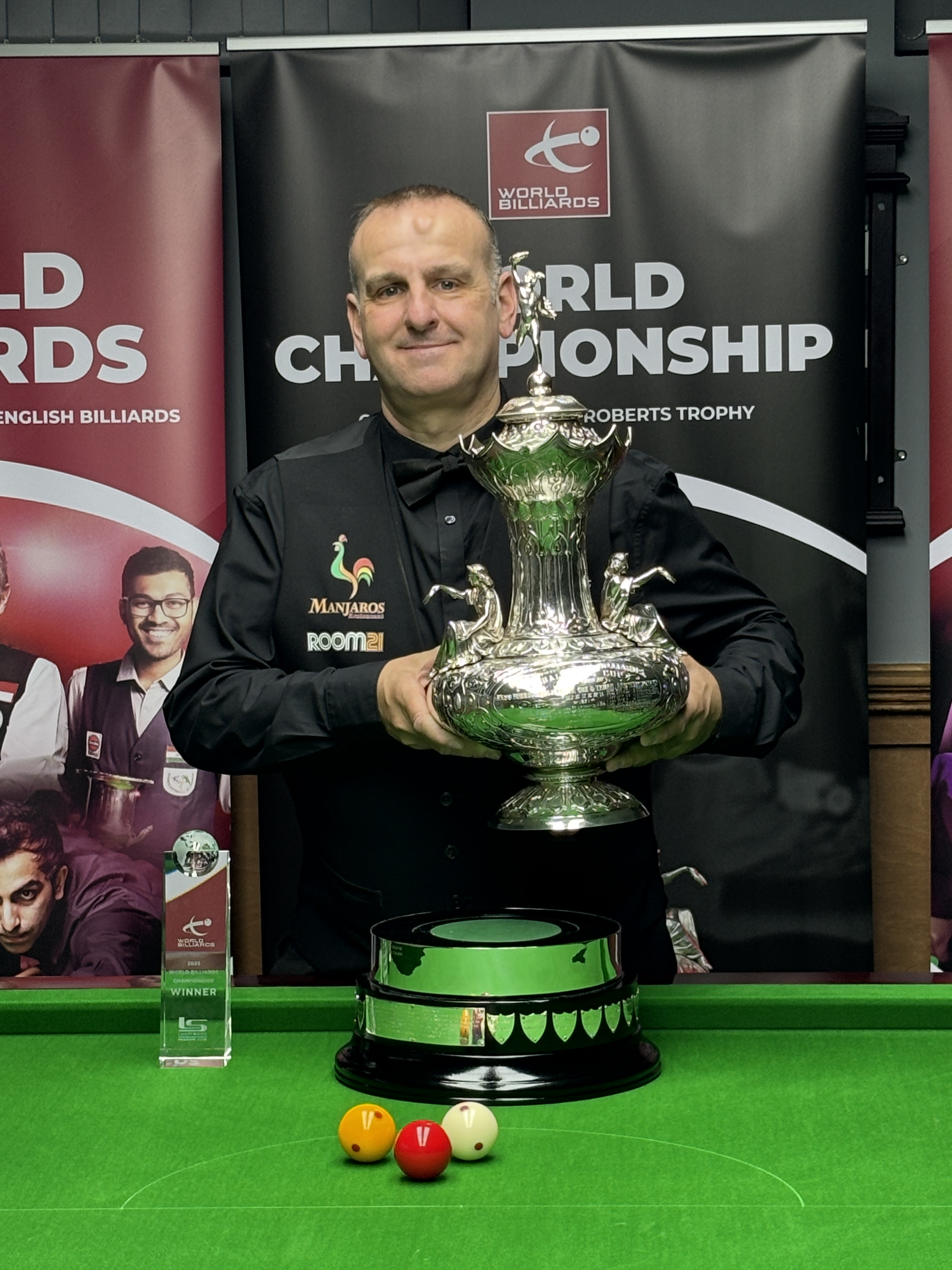
David Causier (pictured with the trophy for the world championship of English billiards), has won the UK title five times, including in 2025 and 2026

The UK Open Billiards Championship, formerly known as the United Kingdom Professional English Billiards Championship, is an English billiards tournament, first contested in 1934. Joe Davis won the inaugural UK Professional English Billiards Championship title with a 18,745–18,309 defeat of Tom Newman. The tournament was originally organised by the Billiards Association and Control Council (BA&CC). After a dispute over a world championship challenge match, the Professional Billiard Players Association (PBPA) — which had been re-established in 1968 by reigning world billiards champion Rex Williams and seven other players – disaffiliated from the BA&CC. The PBPA changed its name to the World Professional Billiards and Snooker Association (WPBSA) in 1970, and declared itself the governing body for the professional games of snooker and English billiards.

After 1934, the UK Championship was the premier event of the billiards season in the UK, in the absence of any contests for the world championships. Walter Lindrum had won the World Professional Championship in 1933, and insisted that the competition should be held in Australia for his defence. Lindrum retained the world championship in 1934, and it was not contested again until 1952. The Championship was staged three more times before being in abeyance from 1952 to 1978. After a further hiatus from 2002, World Billiards, a WPBSA-affiliated organisation, reinstituted the tournament as an open event in 2015. From 1987, it has sometimes been played as a "short format" event, for example in January 1988 the matches before the final were the best-of-seven games of 150-up (i.e. the first player to reach 150 points won the game), and the final was the best-of-thirteen games of 150-up.

The competition was cancelled in 2020 due to the COVID-19 pandemic, and, as of April 2023, had not been held since. The tournament has been staged 36 times and produced 17 different champions. Mike Russell has won the title a record eight times, one more than Joe Davis's total. Causier has taken four titles, and the only other players to have won the tournament more than once are two-time champions Williams, Robby Foldvari, and Roxton Chapman.

== Finals ==
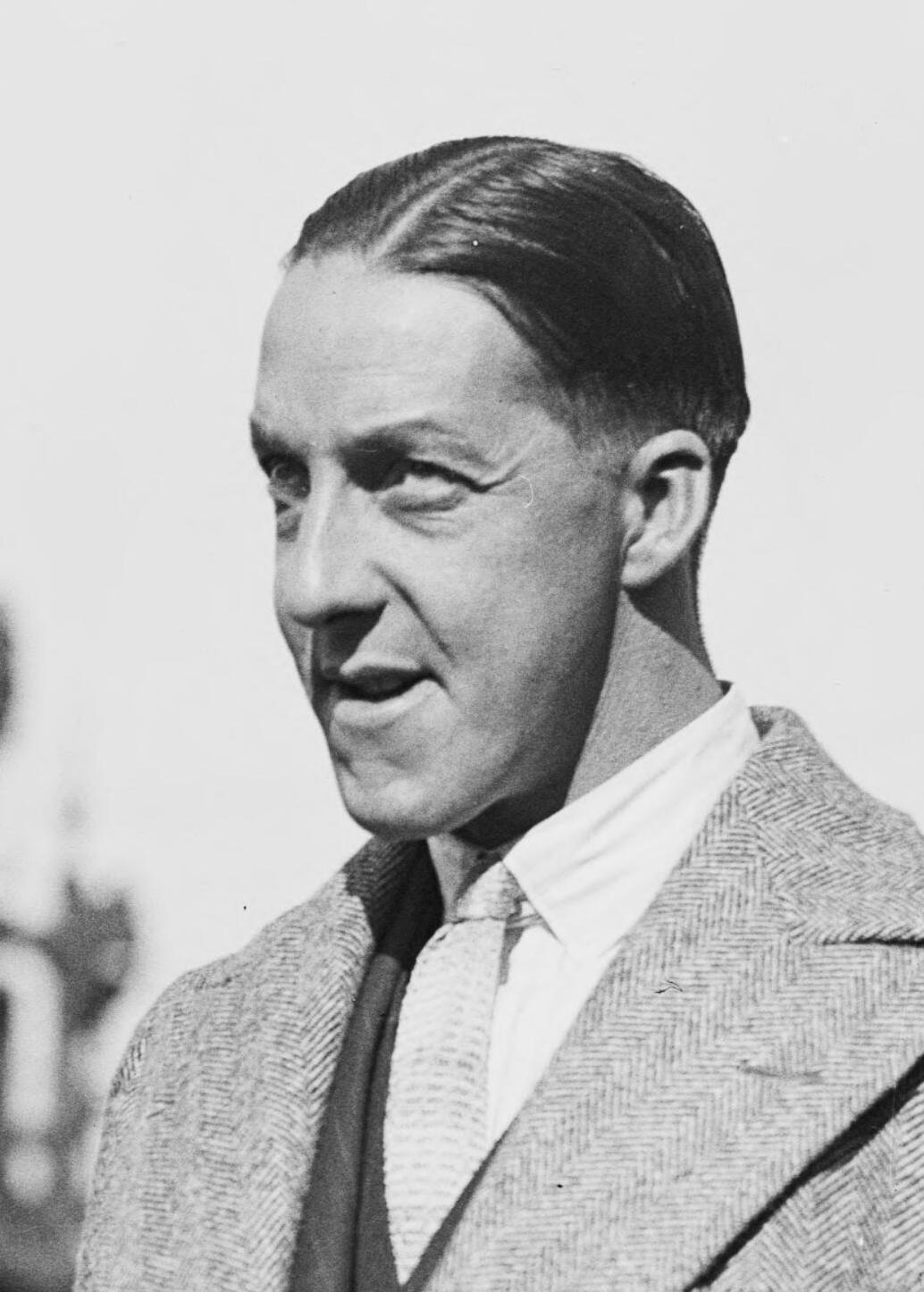
Tom Newman (pictured in 1930) was runner-up to Joe Davis each year from 1934 to 1939.

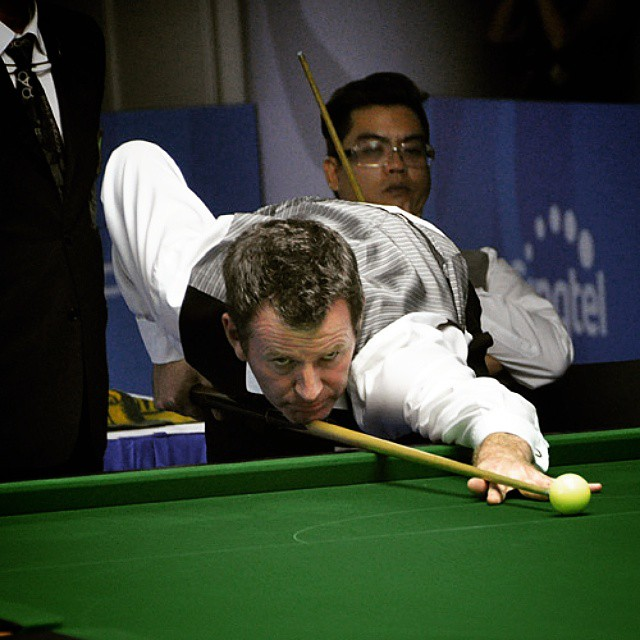
Peter Gilchrist (pictured in 2015) won the title in 2018, having previously finished as runner-up on three occasions.

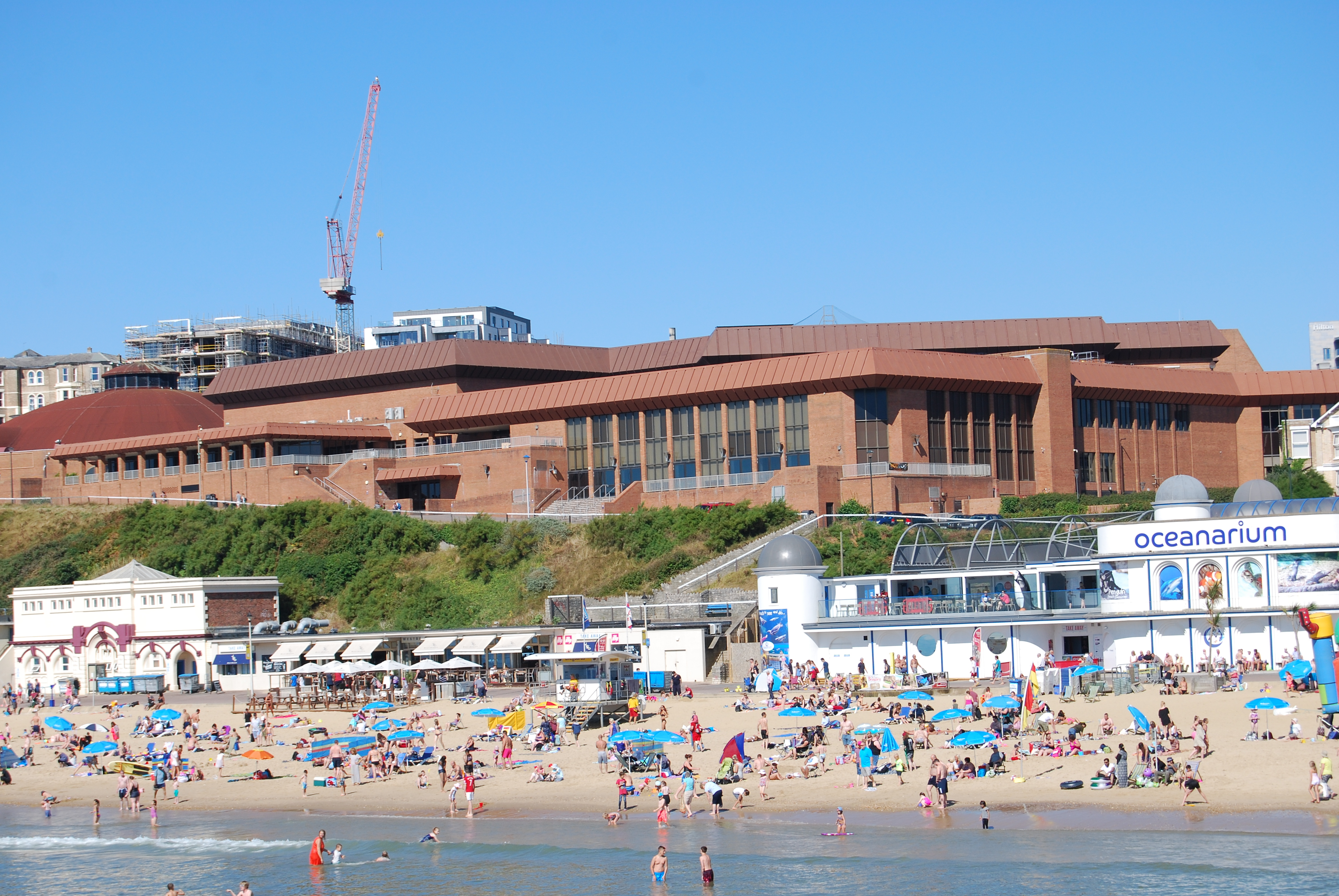
In the hope of attracting television coverage, the 2000 final was held as a short-format contest at the Bournemouth International Centre during the 2000 UK Snooker Championship which was being televised from the venue. Billiards and snooker historian Clive Everton mocked this ambition, noting that there were only 15 spectators at the billiards, and imagined a television announcer introducing "a game none of you understand, played by two people you've never heard of".

List of UK Professional/Open Billiards Championship finals
Year	Champion	Runner-up	Score in the final	Venue	Ref.
1934	Joe Davis (ENG)	Tom Newman (ENG)	18,745–18,309	Thurston's Hall, London	
1935	Joe Davis (ENG)	Tom Newman (ENG)	21,733–19,910	Thurston's Hall, London	
1936	Joe Davis (ENG)	Tom Newman (ENG)	21,710–19,791	Thurston's Hall, London	
1937	Joe Davis (ENG)	Tom Newman (ENG)	22,601–18,321	Thurston's Hall, London	
1938	Joe Davis (ENG)	Tom Newman (ENG)	20,933–19,542	Thurston's Hall, London	
1939	Joe Davis (ENG)	Tom Newman (ENG)	21,601–18,383	Thurston's Hall, London	
1940–1945	Not held				
1946	Joe Davis (ENG)	John Barrie (ENG)	walkover		
1947	Not held				
1948	Sidney Smith (ENG)	John Barrie (ENG)	7,002–6,428	Leicester Square Hall, London	
1949	Not held				
1950	John Barrie (ENG)	Kingsley Kennerley (ENG)	9,046–5,069	Burroughes Hall, London	
1951	Fred Davis (ENG)	Kingsley Kennerley (ENG)	8,120–6,011	Leicester Square Hall, London	
1952–1978	Not held				
1979	Rex Williams (ENG)	John Barrie (ENG)	2,952–2,116	Northern Snooker Centre, Leeds	
1980	Jack Karnehm (ENG)	Rex Williams (ENG)	2,518–2,423	Northern Snooker Centre, Leeds	
1981	Rex Williams (ENG)	Jack Karnehm (ENG)	1,592–1,112	Winter Gardens, Margate	
1982	Not held				
1983	Mark Wildman (ENG)	Fred Davis (ENG)	1,500–1,032	Victoria Snooker Centre, Southend	
1984–1986	Not held				
1987	Norman Dagley (ENG)	Ray Edmonds (ENG)	3–1 (Note: Each game was won by the first player to reach 400 points)	Romiley Forum, Stockport	
January 1988	Ian Williamson (ENG)	Robby Foldvari (AUS)	7–3 (Note: Each game was won by the first player to reach 150 points)	Marton Hotel and Country Club, Middlesbrough	
November 1988	Mike Russell (ENG)	Bob Close (ENG)	7–0	Marton Hotel and Country Club, Middlesbrough	
1990	Mike Russell (ENG)	John Murphy (ENG)	1,478–1,058	Marton Hotel and Country Club, Middlesbrough	
1991	Mike Russell (ENG)	Geet Sethi (IND)	1,794–1,538	Radion Plaza, Sheffield	
1992	Robby Foldvari (AUS)	Subhash Agarwal (IND)	4–1	Royal Hampshire Snooker Lodge, Aldershot	
1993	Robby Foldvari (AUS)	Geet Sethi (IND)	4–0	Radion Plaza, Sheffield	
1994	Mike Russell (ENG)	Peter Gilchrist (ENG)	1,073-332	Plymouth Pavilions	
1995	Subhash Agarwal (IND)	Peter Gilchrist (ENG)	1,240–1,114	Bellingham Hotel, Wigan	
1996	Mike Russell (ENG)	David Causier (ENG)	1,690–1,277	Bellingham Hotel, Wigan	
March 1997	Mike Russell (ENG)	Sonic Multani (IND)	2,476–580	Norwich Sports Village	
November 1997	Geet Sethi (IND)	Roxton Chapman (ENG)	698–293	Preston Guild Hall	
1998	Mike Russell (ENG)	Geet Sethi (IND)	2,204–807	Hospitality Inn, Harrogate	
1999	Roxton Chapman (ENG)	David Causier (ENG)	1,382–1,293	Spa Hotel, Harrogate	
2000	David Causier (ENG)	Robby Foldvari (AUS)	5–1 (Note: Each game was won by the first player to reach 50 points)	Bournemouth International Centre	
2001	David Causier (ENG)	Peter Gilchrist (ENG)	5–4 (Note: Each game was won by the first player to reach 100 points)	Barbican Centre, York	
2002–2014	Not held				
2015	Roxton Chapman (ENG)	David Causier (ENG)	409–351	Northern Snooker Centre, Leeds	
2016	Robert Hall (ENG)	Roxton Chapman (ENG)	913-427	Northern Snooker Centre, Leeds	
2017	Mike Russell (ENG)	David Causier (ENG)	946-915	Northern Snooker Centre, Leeds	
2018	Peter Gilchrist (ENG)	Robert Hall (ENG)	796–667	Northern Snooker Centre, Leeds	
2019	David Causier (ENG)	Mark Hirst (ENG)	632–315	Northern Snooker Centre, Leeds	
2025	David Causier (ENG)	Peter Gilchrist (SIN)	875–388	Landywood Snooker Club, Walsall	
2026	David Causier (ENG)	Christian Kirk (NIR)	1,094–223	Landywood Snooker Club, Walsall	

== Multiple champions ==
Multiple time UK Professional/Open Billiards Championship winners
Player	Total	Years
Mike Russell (ENG)	8	1988 (Nov), 1990, 1991, 1994, 1996, 1997 (Mar), 1998, 2017
Joe Davis (ENG)	7	1934, 1935, 1936, 1937, 1936, 1939, 1946
David Causier (ENG)	5	2000, 2001, 2019, 2025, 2026
Rex Williams (ENG)	2	1979, 1981
Robby Foldvari (AUS)	2	1992, 1993
Roxton Chapman (ENG)	2	1999, 2015
