= World Billiards Championship =

World Billiards Championship may refer to:

- UMB World Three-cushion Championship, a professional tournament in the carom billiards discipline of three-cushion billiards
- World Billiards Championship (English billiards), a professional tournament in the game of English billiards
- IBSF World Billiards Championship, an amateur tournament in English billiards
