= Rupesh Shah =

Indian world champion billiards player

- Born: 5 August 1973 (age 53); Ahmedabad, India
- Sport country: India
- World Billiards Champion: 2012

Rupesh Shah (born 5 August 1973) is an Indian player of English billiards. He was world professional champion (short format) in 2012.

== Biography ==
Shah was born on 5 August 1973 in Ahmedabad, India.

He was introduced to English billiards by his brother, whereafter he won a club level tournament aged 17. In 1993, he qualified as a representative of Gujarat at the Indian national billiards championship, and won both the junior and senior billiards tournaments at the age of 19. The following year, he won the national titles at both billiards and snooker. He won a bronze medal at the 2006 Asian Games as part of the India men's snooker team.

At the 2007 IBSF World Billiards Championship, Shah won through a tough quarter-final against Paprut Chaithanasakul and a semi-final against Kyaw Oo to reach the final. Shah took a 4–1 lead against Ashok Shandilya, but saw his lead reduced to one game, at 5–4, before winning the last game to take the match 6–4. At the 2008 IBSF championship, Shah failed to retain the title, losing 3–5 to Pankaj Advani in the semi-final.

Having turned professional, Shah entered the 2008 World Professional Billiards Championship, but failed to progress from his qualifying group. He lost at the semi-final stage the 2009 World Professional Billiards Championship (long format), having led Mike Russell by 198 before losing by 486.

Russell beat Shah again at the 2010 World Professional Billiards Championship, 995–496 in the quarter-finals, with Russell making a break of 589. At the 2011 World Billiards Championship, Shah was again a losing quarter-finalist, this time 455–1,000 to David Causier.

In the 2012 World Professional Billiards Championship (150-up), Shah recorded wins over Mike Russell, 4–2 in the last 16, and Peter Gilchrist, 5–2 in the semi-final, and beat Matthew Bolton 6–2 in the final to win the title. The following year, he lost in the quarter-finals, 3–4 to Robert Hall.

He was part of the winning team at the first World Billiards Team Championship in 2014. At the World Championship (100 up) in 2016, he was a losing semi-finalist. and at the 2017 World Championships for both short format and long format.

== Career highlights ==
- 2007 IBSF World Billiards Champion
- 2012 World Billiards Champion
