= Neville Chamberlain (police officer) =

British army officer and head of the Irish police force (1856–1944)

Colonel Sir Neville Chamberlain KCB KCVO KStJ KPM
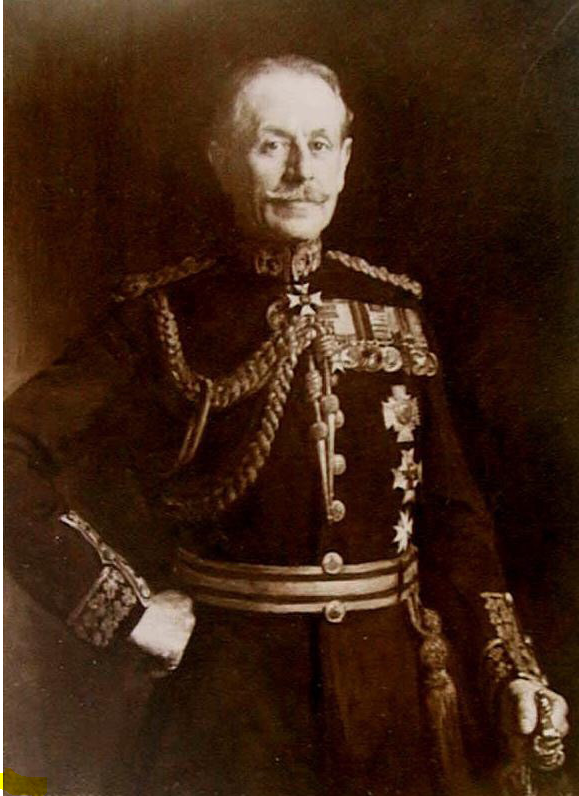
- Born: 13 January 1856; Slough, England
- Died: 28 May 1944 (aged 88); Ascot, England
- Spouse: Mary Henrietta Hay (m. 1886; died 1936)
- Military career
- Allegiance: United Kingdom
- Branch: Indian Army
- Service years: 1873–1901
- Rank: Colonel
- Conflicts: Second Anglo-Afghan War
- Awards: Knight Commander of the Order of the Bath; Knight Commander of the Royal Victorian Order
- Other work: Inspector-General, Royal Irish Constabulary

Sir Neville Francis Fitzgerald Chamberlain KCB KCVO KStJ KPM (13 January 1856 – 28 May 1944) was an officer in the British Indian Army. He was later Inspector-General of the Royal Irish Constabulary, and resigned in the aftermath of the 1916 Easter Rising in Ireland. He is credited with having invented the game of snooker while serving in Jubbulpore (Jabalpur), India, in 1875.

== Early life ==
Chamberlain was born into a military family, in Slough, Berkshire, as the son of Charles Francis Falcon Chamberlain and his wife Marianne Ormsby Drury. He was also the nephew of Neville Bowles Chamberlain. He was educated at Brentwood School, and the Royal Military College, Sandhurst.

== Military career ==
Chamberlain was commissioned a sub-lieutenant in the 11th Foot on 9 August 1873, and promoted to lieutenant in August 1874. In 1878, during the Second Anglo-Afghan War, he joined the staff of Field Marshal Sir Frederick Roberts, Commander-in-Chief of the British Army in Afghanistan. Chamberlain was wounded slightly at the Battle of Kandahar. He served with Roberts at Ootacamund between 1881 and 1885. He was promoted to captain on 9 August 1885, to brevet major on 7 November 1885, and to brevet lieutenant-colonel on 1 July 1887.

In 1890 he became Military Secretary to the Kashmir government. He was promoted to brevet colonel on 6 January 1894. He was promoted to colonel on 6 February 1899, when he was appointed Colonel on the Staff in Delhi.

Following the outbreak of the Second Boer War, Lord Roberts had been appointed Commander-in-Chief of the British forces in South Africa. Chamberlain rejoined Lord Roberts in South Africa in December 1899, as "First Aide-de-Camp and Private Secretary", and was highly commended by Roberts in despatches from the war in 1900.

== Royal Irish Constabulary ==
Chamberlain was made a Companion of the Order of the Bath in 1900. In the same year he was appointed Inspector-General of the Royal Irish Constabulary (RIC), the armed police force for the whole of Ireland except Dublin. The force was under the direct control of the British Administration in Ireland, based in Dublin Castle. It was responsible for intelligence gathering as well as maintaining order, and was seen as the "eyes and ears" of the government. He formally resigned from the British Army on 1 November 1901.

He was appointed Knight Commander of the Order of the Bath (KCB) in August 1903, Knight Commander of the Royal Victorian Order (KCVO) in 1911 and Knight of Grace in the Venerable Order of Saint John in April 1914, and was awarded the King's Police Medal in the 1915 New Year Honours. Chamberlain's years in the RIC coincided with the rise of a number of political, cultural and sporting organisations with the common aim of separating Ireland from the UK, which were often referred to as Sinn Féin, culminating in the formation of the Irish Volunteers in 1913.

In reports to the Chief Secretary for Ireland, Augustine Birrell, and the Under-Secretary, Sir Matthew Nathan, Chamberlain warned that the Volunteers were preparing to stage an insurrection and proclaim Irish independence. However, in April 1916, when Nathan showed him a letter from the army commander in the south of Ireland telling of an expected landing of arms on the south-west coast and a rising planned for Easter, they were both "doubtful whether there was any foundation for the rumour". The Easter Rising began on Easter Monday, 24 April 1916, and lasted for six days, ending only when much of Sackville Street had been destroyed by artillery fire. Although the Royal Commission on the 1916 Rebellion (the Hardinge commission) cleared the RIC of any blame for the Rising, Chamberlain was eventually forced to resign following continued criticism of the force's intelligence handling.

== Later life ==
After his retirement, Chamberlain lived in Ascot, Berkshire, England. On 19 March 1938, he had a letter published in The Field in which he claimed to have invented the game of snooker at the officers' mess of the 11th Devonshire Regiment in Jubbulpore (Jabalpur), India in 1875. His claim was supported by the author Compton Mackenzie in a letter to The Billiard Player in 1939, and has been accepted by present-day governing bodies, such as the International Billiards and Snooker Federation.

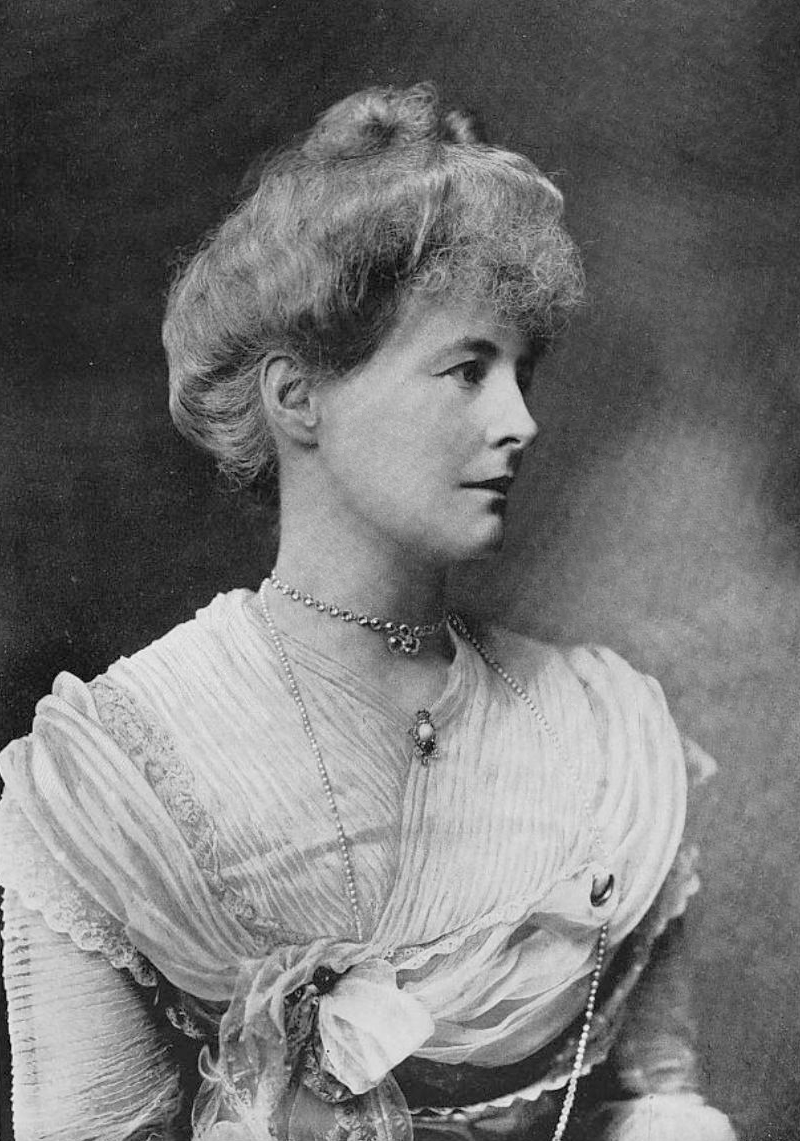
Mary Henrietta Hay in 1902

The Oxford Dictionary of National Biography describes the circumstances in which the new game came about:

While serving at Jubbulpore in 1875 Chamberlain developed a new variation of black pool by introducing coloured balls into the game. It was dubbed snooker—a derogatory nickname given to first-year cadets studying at the Royal Military Academy at Woolwich that Chamberlain had heard about from a young Royal Artillery subaltern visiting the mess. Chamberlain later retorted to a fellow player who had failed to pot a coloured ball: "Why, you're a regular snooker". While explaining the term to his fellow officers Chamberlain, to mollify the officer concerned, remarked that they were all "snookers at the game" and the name snooker or snooker's pool immediately stuck.

Chamberlain married Mary Henrietta Hay (1866–1936) in 1886. Their daughter, Nora (1887–1956), married Clive Wigram, 1st Baron Wigram. Chamberlain died from myocarditis at his home in Ascot, Berkshire on 28 May 1944, aged 88.
