= IBSF World Billiards Championship =

Amateur world championship in English billiards

The IBSF World Billiards Championship (previously known as the World Amateur Billiards Championship) is the premier, international, non-professional tournament for the game of English billiards. Dating to some form to 1951, the event has been sanctioned by the International Billiards and Snooker Federation since 1973.

== History ==
Prior to 1951, when the first "world amateur" championship was held under the auspices of the Billiards Association and Control Council (based in London), this event was called the [British] Empire Billiards Championship.

In 1971, after many years' discussion, the World Billiards & Snooker Council was formed, changing its name in 1973 to the International Billiards & Snooker Federation. The name change came about because of the disquiet of many overseas national associations that the same body should oversee both the English domestic game and the game at international level. Consequently, the IBSF took control of the organisation of the non-professional championships of both snooker and billiards. The first winner from outside the British Commonwealth did not occur until 1999.

From 2012 to 2015, the IBSF World Billiards Championship was merged with the World Professional Billiards Championship. Under the name World Billiards Championship, tournaments were held in both points and timed format.

== Champions ==
Finals are listed below.

=== Men ===
#	Year	Venue	Winner	Runner-up	Score
Billiards Association and Control Council
1	1926	London	(England) Joe Earlam	(Australia) George Shailer	Round Robin
2	1927	London	(South Africa) Allan Prior	(Wales) Horace Coles	Round Robin
3	1929	Johannesburg	(Australia) Les Hayes	(South Africa) Allan Prior	Round Robin
4	1931	Sydney	(England) Laurie Steeples	(England) Sydney Lee	Round Robin
5	1933	London	(England) Sydney Lee	(Wales) Tom Jones	Round Robin
6	1935	London	(Wales) Horace Coles	(Scotland) J McGhie	Round Robin
7	1936	Johannesburg	(Australia) Bob Marshall	(South Africa) Allan Prior	Round Robin
8	1938	Melbourne	(Australia) Bob Marshall	(England) Kingsley Kennerley	Round Robin
Billiards and Snooker Control Council
9	1951	London	(Australia) Bob Marshall	(England) Frank Edwards	Round Robin
10	1952	Calcutta	(England) Leslie Driffield	(Australia) Bob Marshall	Round Robin
11	1954	Sydney	(Australia) Tom Cleary	(Australia) Bob Marshall	Round Robin
12	1958	Calcutta	(India) Wilson Jones	(England) Leslie Driffield	Round Robin
13	1960	Edinburgh	(England) Herbert Beetham	(Australia) Jim Long	Round Robin
14	1962	Perth	(Australia) Bob Marshall	(India) Wilson Jones	3623–2891
15	1964	Pukekohe	(India) Wilson Jones	(England) Jack Karnehm	Round Robin
16	1967	Colombo	(England) Leslie Driffield	(Sri Lanka) Muhammad Lafir	Round Robin
17	1969	London	(England) Jack Karnehm	(India) Michael Ferreira	Round Robin
18	1971	Malta	(England) Norman Dagley	(South Africa) Mannie Francisco	Round Robin
International Billiards and Snooker Federation (IBSF)
19	1973	Bombay	(Sri Lanka) Muhammad Lafir	(India) Satish Mohan	Round Robin
20	1975	Auckland	(England) Norman Dagley	(India) Michael Ferreira	3385–2268
21	1977	Melbourne	(India) Michael Ferreira	(England) Bob Close	2683–2564
22	1979	Sri Lanka	(Malta) Paul Mifsud	(England) Norman Dagley	2943–2152
23	1981	Delhi	(India) Michael Ferreira	(England) Norman Dagley	2725–2631
24	1983	Malta	(India) Michael Ferreira	(India) Subhash Agarwal	3933–2744
25	1985	Dublin	(India) Geet Sethi	(Australia) Bob Marshall	3809–2453
26	1987	Belfast	(India) Geet Sethi	(Malta) Joe Grech	4846–3256
27	1990	Bangalore	(India) Manoj Kothari	(India) Ashok Shandilya	2890–2422
28	1997	Malta	(Malta) Joe Grech	(India) Ashok Shandilya	2895–2836
29	1998	Australia	(Australia) Robby Foldvari	(Thailand) Praput Chaithanasakun	1869–1439
30	1999	Ireland	(Thailand) Praput Chaithanasakun	(England) Paul Bennett	3201–1657
31	2000	England	(England) Chris Shutt	(England) Roxton Chapman	11–9 (50up)
32	2001	New Zealand	(India) Geet Sethi	(India) Ashok Shandilya	3484–1289
Both formats (timed and points)
33	2002	Australia (timed)	(England) Mike Russell	(India) Geet Sethi	2438–1499
33	2002	Australia (points)	(India) Ashok Shandilya	(Thailand) Praput Chaithanasakun	11–9 (50up)
34	2003	India	(England) Lee Lagan	(India) Geet Sethi	6–5 (150up)
35	2005	Malta (timed)	(India) Pankaj Advani	(India) Geet Sethi	2242–1717
35	2005	Malta (points)	(India) Pankaj Advani	(India) Devendra Joshi	6–2 (150up)
36	2007	Singapore (timed)	(India) Pankaj Advani	(India) Dhruv Sitwala	1946–1488
36	2007	Singapore (points)	(India) Rupesh Shah	(India) Ashok Shandilya	6–4 (150up)
37	2008	Bangalore (timed)	(India) Pankaj Advani	(India) Devendra Joshi	2368–2020
37	2008	Bangalore (points)	(India) Pankaj Advani	(India) Geet Sethi	6–1 (150up)
38	2010	Maharashtra (timed)	(England) Mike Russell	(Singapore) Peter Gilchrist	4120–784
38	2010	Maharashtra (points)	(England) Mike Russell	(India) Pankaj Advani	6–0 (150up)
39	2011	Carlow (timed)	(England) Mike Russell	(Australia) Matthew Bolton	3001–519
39	2011	Carlow (points)	(England) Mike Russell	(India) Pankaj Advani	6–3 (150up)
2012–2015 with World Professional Billiards and Snooker Association (WPBSA)
40	2012	England (timed)	(India) Pankaj Advani	(England) Mike Russell	1895–1216
40	2012	England (points)	(India) Rupesh Shah	(Australia) Matthew Bolton	6–2
41	2013	England (Long-Up)	(Singapore) Peter Gilchrist	(England) David Causier	1500–1085
41	2013	England (150-Up)	(England) David Causier	(India) Alok Kumar	6–1
42	2014	England (timed)	(India) Pankaj Advani	(England) Rob Hall	1928–893
42	2014	England (150-up)	(India) Pankaj Advani	(Singapore) Peter Gilchrist	6–2
43	2015	Adelaide (timed)	(India) Pankaj Advani	(Singapore) Peter Gilchrist	2408–1240
43	2015	Adelaide (150-Up)	(Singapore) Peter Gilchrist	(India) Pankaj Advani	6–4
World Billiards Championships
44	2016	India (150-Up)	(India) Pankaj Advani	(Singapore) Peter Gilchrist	6–3
44	2016	India (Long-Up)	(Singapore) Peter Gilchrist	(India) Sourav Kothari	1500–617
45	2017	Doha (150-Up)	(India) Pankaj Advani	(England) Mike Russell	6–2
45	2017	Doha (Long-Up)	(England) Mike Russell	(England) Robert Hall	1500–1284
46	2018	Yangon (150-Up)	(India) Pankaj Advani	(Myanmar) Nay Thway Oo	6–2
46	2018	Yangon (Long-Up)	(India) Pankaj Advani	(India) Bhaskar Balachandra	1500–299
47	2019	Mandalay (150-Up)	(India) Pankaj Advani	(Myanmar) Nay Thway Oo	6–2
47	2019	Mandalay (Long-Up)	(Singapore) Peter Gilchrist	(Thailand) Praprut Chaithanasakun	1000–732
48	2022	Kuala Lumpur (150-Up)	(India) Pankaj Advani	(India) Sourav Kothari	4–0
49	2023	Doha (150-Up)	(India) Pankaj Advani	(India) Sourav Kothari	5–0
49	2023	Doha (Long-Up)	(India) Pankaj Advani	(India) Sourav Kothari	1000–416
50	2025	Carlow (timed)	(India) Sourav Kothari	(India) Pankaj Advani	725–480
51	2026	Carlow (timed)	(India) Sourav Kothari	(India) Pankaj Advani	1133–477

=== Women ===
1. 2015 Australia:

Arantxa Sanchis India - Revanna Umadevi India 414-255

In 2015, the International Billiards and Snooker Federation held its own version of a World Women's Billiards Championship. Arantxa Sanchis defeated Revanna Umadevi to take the title.

IBSF World Women's Billiards Championship final
Year	Organiser	Winner	Runner-up	Final score	Venue	Ref.
2015	IBSF	Arantxa Sanchis (IND)	Revanna Umadevi (IND)	414–255	Oceania Snooker Academy, Adelaide	

=== Juniors Men ===
1. 2015 Australia:

S. Shrikrishna India - Ishpreet Chadha India 731-525

=== Juniors Women ===
Not held.

== Summary ==
=== Men ===
Country	Titles
India	27
England	18
Australia	7
Singapore	4
Malta	2
South Africa	1
Sri Lanka	1
Thailand	1
Wales	1

=== Women ===
Country	Titles
India	1

== See also ==
- World Billiards Championship (English billiards)
- World Women's Billiards Championship
- Women's Professional Billiards Championship
