= Dhruv Sitwala =

Indian player of English billiards

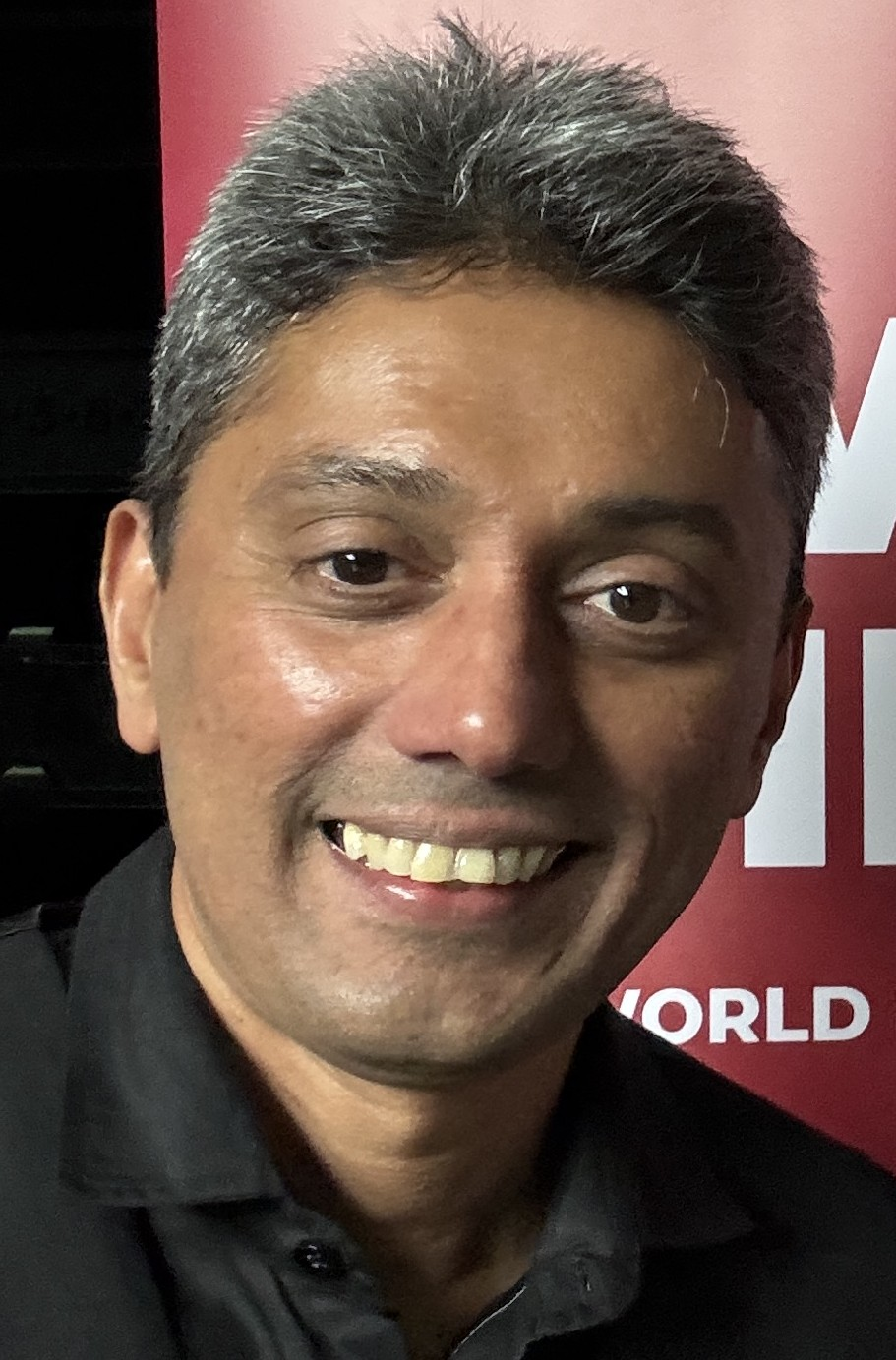
- Born: 15 October 1972 (age 53)
- Sport country: India
- Highest break: 654

Dhruv Sitwala (born 15 October 1972) is an Indian player of English billiards. He has reached four world finals, and twice been Asian Billiards champion.

In 2007, Sitwala reached the final of the timed version of the IBSF World Billiards Championship, losing 1488–1946 to Pankaj Advani.

In the semi-final of the 2010 World Professional Billiards Championship, Sitwala won by a single point, 980-979 against Geet Sethi. Mike Russell won his 10th World Professional Billiards Championship title after beating Sitwala 1738–1204 in the final. Sitwala was also the losing finalist in the 2016 short format World Billiards Championship, losing 6–8 to David Causier in the final.

In 2016, Sitwala won 6–2 against Bhaskar Balachandra in the final to successfully defend the Asian Billiards Championship title that he had won the previous year.

At the 2019 Pan-Am Cup in Winnipeg, Peter Gilchrist beat Sitwala 1500-507 in the final.

Sitwala's highest break break in competition is 654.

== Career highlights ==
- 2007 IBSF World Billiards Championship runner-up
- 2010 World Billiards Championship runner-up
- 2015 Asian Billiards Champion
- 2016 Asian Billiards Champion
- 2016 World Billiards Championship runner-up
- 2019 Pan-Am Cup runner-up
- 2025 World Billiards Championship runner-up
