= Geet Sethi =

Indian billiards player

- Sethi in 2026

Personal information
- Born: 17 April 1961 (age 65) Delhi, India

Sport
- Country: India
- Sport: Snooker
Medal record
Men's English billiards
Representing India
Asian Games
Gold medal – first place	1998 Bangkok	Teams
Silver medal – second place	1998 Bangkok	Singles
Silver medal – second place	2002 Busan	Teams
Bronze medal – third place	2002 Busan	Singles
Bronze medal – third place	2006 Doha	Teams

- World Billiards Champion: 5
- IBSF World Billiards Champion: 3

Geet Siriram Sethi (born 17 April 1961) of India is a professional player of English billiards who dominated the sport throughout much of the 1990s. He is also a notable amateur (ex-pro) snooker player. He is a five-time winner of the professional-level and a three-time winner of the amateur world championships, and holder of two world records, in English billiards. Along with Prakash Padukone, Sethi has co-founded Olympic Gold Quest, a foundation for the promotion of sports in India.

== Career ==
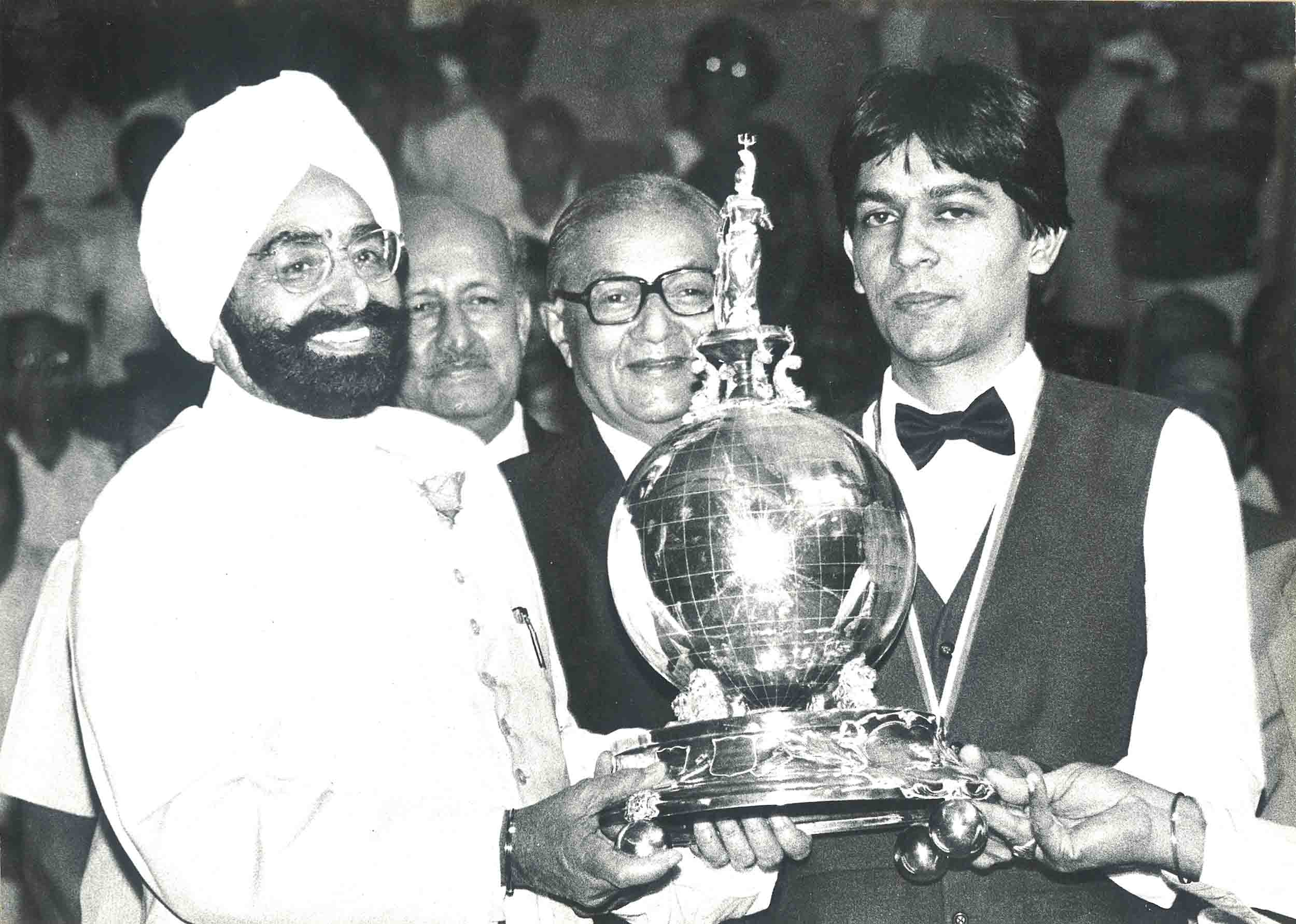
President Giani Zail Singh presenting World Billiards Championship Cup to Geet Sethi at Taj Palace Hotel

Born in Delhi and grew up in Ahmedabad, Sethi won his first major English billiards event in 1982, the Indian National Billiards Championship (an international event despite its name), defeating Michael Ferreira, and went on to win the NBC again four years in a row, 1985–1988, and made a comeback in both 1997 and 1998 to reclaim the title.

He rose to international prominence by winning the IBSF World Amateur Billiards Championships in 1985, versus Bob Marshall in an eight-hour-long final round. In 1987, he again won the IBSF event, as well as the ACBS Asian Billiards Championship. He won another World Amateur Billiards title 2001, despite having previously played as a pro by that date.

Sethi also took the Indian National Snooker Championships four times back to back, in the same 1985–1988 span as his national English billiards streak. In the 1989 event, held at Guntur, Andhra Pradesh, though he did not take the title, he did achieve the world's first amateur maximum break of 147 in official competition. He has never placed in the top snooker world rankings, however. Sethi is the only person in the history of cue-sports to have scored a maximum (147) in competitive snooker and a 1000+ break in competitive billiards.

In the 1992 World Professional Billiards Championship, Sethi constructed a world-record English billiards break of 1276 in 80 minutes under the three-pot rule, also the highest break in five decades, and won first place. He went on to win the title again in 1993, 1995, 1998, and 2006.

In the 2006 event, in Prestatyn, Wales, he defeated David Causier in the quarter final, and defending World Pro Champion Chris Shutt in the semi-final. He won the title round 2073–1057 (average per inning 34.3 vs. 17.0) in a timed five-hour final against Lee Lagan (who had previously beaten him 6 frames to 5 at the untimed 2003 IBSF Amateur World Championship). After running two centuries in the first hour, Sethi led by 150, increased this to 427 with two more centuries by the end of the first of the two sessions, and followed it up with a double century of 238 points; meanwhile Langan only managed two centuries in the first session and one in the second.. When the match time ran out, Sethi had just reached a double century again, at 206, and had been poised to continue the break.

He has been described as an "arch-rival" of Mike Russell of England, also an eight-time English billiards World Champion, and each of them had defeated the other for the title, with Russell victorious in 1996, and Sethi the winner in 1998, as of their next encounter at the 2007 event. They both scored two triple centuries apiece in the semi-finals, but Russell knocked Sethi out of the running, 1835–1231 (65.5 vs. 45.6 average); Russell eventually won the title, for his ninth World crown.

Sethi won gold and silver medals in doubles and singles English billiards respectively at the 13th Asian Games (1998, Bangkok, Thailand). He also won silver and bronze medals in doubles and singles English billiards respectively at the 14th Asian Games (2002, Busan, South Korea). At the 15th Asian Games (2006, Doha, Qatar), he took bronze medal in English billiards (men's doubles with Ashok Harishankar Shandilya).

He has announced plans to compete in the Olympic Games for India when cue sports are finally admitted as Olympic sports (long in-progress between the World Confederation of Billiard Sports and the International Olympic Committee).

Sethi's professional management agent, TNQ Sponsorship, commented that he "has been focussing^{[sic]} on the sport with renewed enthusiasm" and "seems to be peaking at the right time".

== World Professional Billiards Championship results ==
- 1992: Won (beat Mike Russell, 2529–718)
- 1993: Won (beat Mike Russell, 2139–1140)
- 1994: Semi-finalist (lost to Peter Gilchrist, 916–1312)
- 1995: Won (beat Devendra Joshi, 1661–931)
- 1996: Runner-up (lost to Mike Russell, 1848–2534)
- 1997: Event was not held
- 1998: Won (beat Mike Russell, 1400–1015)
- 1999:
- 2000: Event was not held
- 2001: Quarter-finalist
- 2002: Semi-finalist (lost to Peter Gilchrist, 851–1767)
- 2003: Lost in the group stage
- 2004: Quarter-finalist (lost to David Causier, 722–971)
- 2006: Won (beat England's Lee Lagan, 2073–1057)
- 2007: Semi-finalist (lost to Mike Russell, 1231–1835)
- 2008: Runner-up (lost to Mike Russell, 1342–1821)

== Titles ==
- World Professional Billiards Champion: 1992, 1993, 1995, 1998, 2006
- World Amateur Billiards Champion: 1985, 1987, 2001
- Gold Medalist, 13th Asian Games, Bangkok 1998
- Asian Billiards Champion: 1987
- National Billiards Champion: 1982, 1985, 1986, 1987, 1988, 1997, 1998
- National Snooker Champion: 1985, 1986, 1987 and 1988

== Awards and recognition ==
A major sporting hero in India, he is a recipient of India's highest sporting award, the Major Dhyan Chand Khel Ratna for 1992–1993; both the Padma Shri and the Arjuna Award in 1986; and the K.K. Birla Award, 1993.

== Personal life ==
Sethi lives in Ahmedabad, with his wife Kiran Bir Sethi and their two children, Raag, and Jazz. In addition to billiards competitions, Sethi runs a private travel agency in Ahmedabad and Mumbai called Raag Travels. Sethi has an MBA from the B.K. School of Business Management, Gujarat University and is an alumnus of St. Xavier's High School and St. Xavier's College in Ahmedabad.

In 2005 he authored an autobiographical motivational book called Success vs Joy.

== Current ventures ==
Currently he is promoting a venture called Olympic Gold Quest, committed to supporting Indian sportspersons with Olympic medal-winning potential.
