= David Causier =

English world champion billiards player

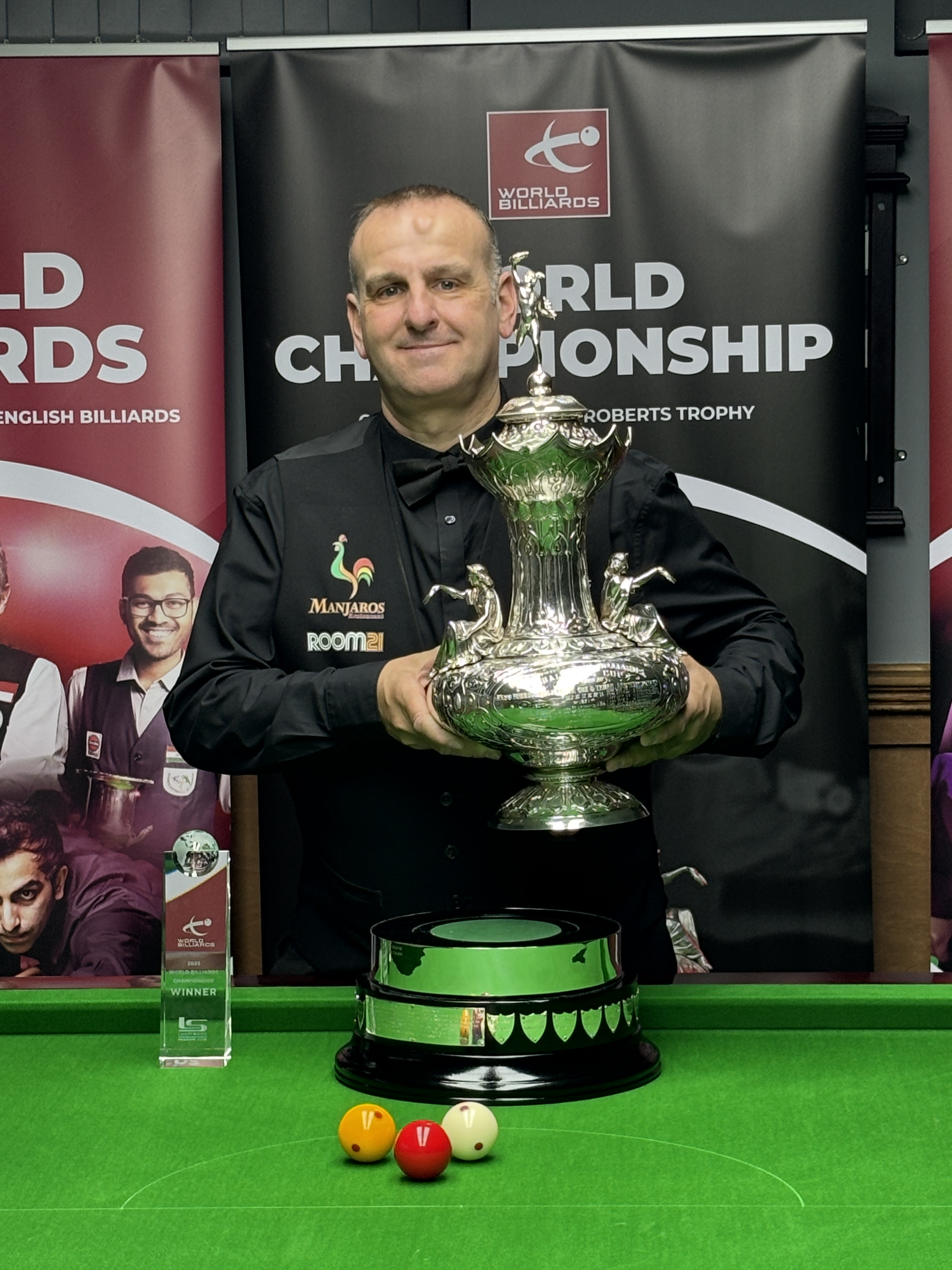
- Causier in 2025
- Born: Middlesbrough
- Sport country: England
- Highest ranking: 1
- World Billiards Champion: 2013, 2015, 2016, 2017 (Short); 2015, 2017, 2022, 2024, 2025 (Long)

David Causier is an English world champion player of English billiards.

== Biography ==
Causier won the English Amateur Billiards title in 1992, 1993, and 1995; and the UK Championship in 2000 and 2001 (following which no UK championship was held from 2002 to 2014).

In 2012, the IBSF World Billiards Championship was merged with the former professional championship under the name World Billiards Championship, and tournaments were held in both points and timed format. Causier won the 2013 150-up ("short format") title, and was runner-up in the timed ("long") format. He went on to win the 2015, 2016, 2017 short titles and the long format titles in 2015 and 2017.

Causier won four trophies in the 2018/19 season, despite not playing in all of the circuit's events, including winning the UK Open and the World Matchplay title.

His job was managing The Normanby pub in Middlesbrough from about 2011 to 2018, and he only played billiards part-time.

== World Championship Finals record ==
Date	Format	Winner	Score	Runner-up
2013	Short	(England) David Causier	6-1	(India) Alok Kumar
2013	Long	(Singapore) Peter Gilchrist	1,500-1,085	(England) David Causier
2015	Short	(England) David Causier	6-1	(England) Robert Hall
2015	Long	(England) David Causier	1,500-1,277	(Singapore) Peter Gilchrist
2016	Short	(England) David Causier	8-6	(India) Dhruv Sitwala
2016	Timed	(England) Mike Russell	2,224-1,115	(England) David Causier
2017	Short	(England) David Causier	8-4	(India) Sourav Kothari
2017	Long	(England) David Causier	1,500-779	(Singapore) Peter Gilchrist
2022	Long	(England) David Causier	1776-1092	(Singapore) Peter Gilchrist
2024	Long	(England) David Causier	2088-1109	(England) Robert Hall
2025	Long	(England) David Causier	2,948–677	(India) Dhruv Sitwala

== Other career titles ==
- English Amateur Billiards Champion 1992, 1993, 1995
- 2000 UK Champion
- 2001 UK Champion
- 2019 Irish Billiards Open Champion
- 2019 European Billiards Open Champion
- 2019 UK Champion
