= Sourav Kothari =

Indian world champion billiards player

- Born: 16 November 1984 (age 41); Kolkata, India
- Sport country: India
- World Billiards Champion: 2018 WBL; 2025 IBSF

Sourav Kothari (born 16 November 1984) is an Indian player of English billiards. He was world champion in 2018.

== Biography ==
Kothari was born in Kolkota on 16 November 1984.

He won the ONGC 13th Asian Billiards Championship 2014,beating Alok Kumar in the final, and a gold medal at the 2017 Asian Indoor Games.

He was a runner-up to David Causier at the 2017 World Billiards Championship, losing 4–8 in the short format (150-up) final.

Kothari won the World Billiards Championship in 2018 with a 1,134–944 victory over Peter Gilchrist. In the semi-final, Kothari had been more than 500 points behind Causier, before coming back to win.

In 2019 Kothari again reached the world championship final, finishing runner-up by 1,307–967 to Gilchrist. Kothari also won the 2019 Reventon Masters against Johl Younger (6-5) and Reventon Classic against Tyson Crinis (5-1), two tournaments of the Reventon Triple Crown series.

He defeated Pankaj Advani 725-480 in the final of the 2025 IBSF World Billiards Championship.

== Career highlights ==
- 2017 WBLWorld Billiards Championship Runner-up (150-up)
- 2018 WBL World Billiards Champion
- 2019 WBL World Billiards Championship Runner-up
- 2025 IBSF World Billiards Championship Champion
- 2026 IBSF World Billiards Championship Champion
