= Mike Russell (billiards player) =

British billiards player

Russsell in 2026

Mike Russell (born c. 1969) is an English player of English billiards. He is twelve-time WPBSA World Champion and has six IBSF World Billiards Championship titles.

In 1989, aged 20, he became the youngest ever World Billiards Champion.

He has been described as an "archrival" of India's prodigy, Geet Sethi, an eight-time World Champion, and each of them had defeated the other for the title, with Russell victorious in 1996, and Sethi the winner in 1998, as of their next encounter at the 2007 event. Both scored two triple centuries apiece, but Russell knocked Sethi out in the semi-finals, 1835–1231, (65.5 vs. 45.6 average). Russell went on to win the title for the ninth time and a £6,000 prize, solidly beating Chris Shutt, 2166–1710 (52.8 vs. 42.8 avg.), with four double and four triple centuries to Shutt's four and none, respectively.

At the IBSF World Billiards Championships 2010, Russell not only claimed the 150up- and time-format title, recorded a break of 1137 points in the time-format final. Even though the amateur rules applied in this tournament do not include the "Baulk line rule" used in professional events, he is only the fourth player ever to score a break of over 1000 in an official match under modern rules.
