= Peter Gilchrist (billiards player) =

Singaporean billiards player

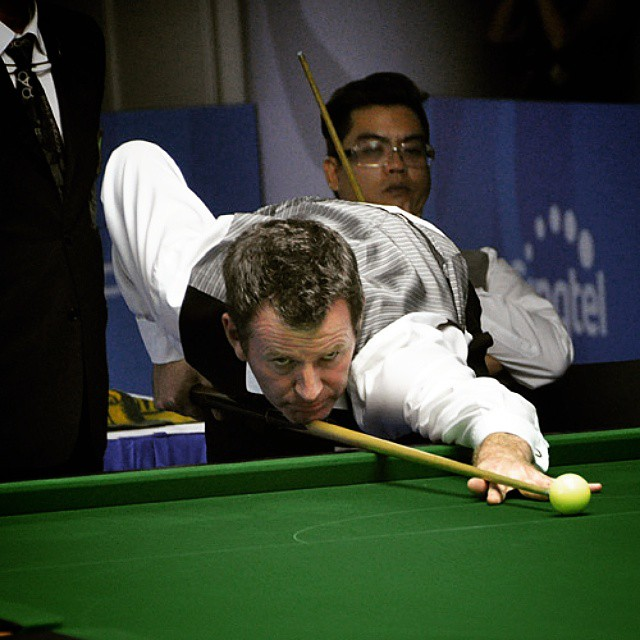
- Gilchrist at the 2015 SEA Games

Personal information
- Born: 1968 (age 57–58) Middlesbrough, England

Sport
- Country: Singapore
- Sport: Snooker
Medal record
Men's English billiards
Representing Singapore
SEA Games
Gold medal – first place	2009 Laos	Singles
Gold medal – first place	2011 Indonesia	Singles
Gold medal – first place	2013 Myanmar	Singles
Gold medal – first place	2015 Singapore	Singles
Gold medal – first place	2015 Singapore	Singles
Gold medal – first place	2017 Kuala Lumpur	Singles
Gold medal – first place	2019 Philippines	Singles
Gold medal – first place	2021 Hanoi	Doubles
Gold medal – first place	2025 Thailand	Singles
Silver medal – second place	2021 Hanoi	Singles
Silver medal – second place	2023 Phnom Penh	Singles
Silver medal – second place	2015 Singapore	Doubles
Bronze medal – third place	2009 Laos	Doubles
Bronze medal – third place	2011 Indonesia	Doubles
Bronze medal – third place	2013 Myanmar	Doubles
Bronze medal – third place	2017 Kuala Lumpur	Doubles
Asian Games
Bronze medal – third place	2006 Doha	Singles
Bronze medal – third place	2010 Guangzhou	Singles
Asian Indoor Games
Silver medal – second place	2009 Vietnam	Singles
Bronze medal – third place	2007 Macau	Singles
Bronze medal – third place	2013 Incheon	Singles

Peter Edward Gilchrist (born 1968) is a Singaporean billiards player. He won the World Billiards Championship (English billiards) in 1994, 2001, 2013 (long format), 2019 and 2023.

== Career ==
=== Early years ===
Gilchrist played in Teesside Boys Billiards League as a youth. he was the English Amateur Champion in 1988.

Gilchrist won the World Billiards Championship (English billiards) in 1994, 2001, 2013 (long format) 2019, and 2023. He also won the International Billiards and Snooker Federation World Championship in 2015 (short format), 2016 and 2019 (long up).

=== Regional successes ===
In 2003, Gilchrist emigrated to Singapore to become the national billiards and snooker coach. Gilchrist began representing Singapore at the 2009 SEA Games, where he won Gold for English Billiards Singles, and Bronze for the doubles.

Gilchrist set the world record for highest break in billiards (1346) under modern rules, at the New Zealand Open Billiards Championships. On 14 February 2014, he scored his second 1000 break, at the World Billiards Irish Open. Gilchrist is the only player of the modern era who scored more than one 1000 points in tournament break.

Gilchrist won the 2019 Pacific International Billiards Championship, beating Sourav Kothari 1500–706 in the final. Gilchrist is a two-time recipient of the Singapore Sports Awards' Sportsman of the Year title (2014 and 2020).

In 2022, during the 2021 SEA Games, Gilchrist won the silver medal after losing 3–1 to Myanmar's Pauk Sa, ending a streak of six gold medals since the 2009 SEA Games in the English billiards men's singles event. He regained his title from Sa at the 2025 SEA Games.

== Personal life ==
Gilchrist became a Singaporean citizen in 2006. He renounced his British citizenship at the same time as Singapore does not permit multiple citizenships under Singaporean nationality law.

== See also ==
- List of Singapore world champions in sports
