= List of snooker players =

This is a list of notable amateur and professional snooker players, past and present.

== A ==
- Hugh Abernethy (SCO)
- Khaled Belaid Abumdas (LBY)
- Pankaj Advani (IND)
- Subhash Agarwal (IND)
- Khurram Hussain Agha (PAK)
- Omprakesh Agrawal (IND)
- Farakh Ajaib (PAK)
- Sunny Akani (THA)
- Hamza Akbar (PAK)
- Joven Alba (PHL)
- Shokat Ali (PAK)
- Ahmed Aly Elsayed (USA)
- Gareth Allen (WAL)
- Mark Allen (NIR)
- Amine Amiri (MAR)
- Ian Anderson (AUS)
- Roy Andrewartha (WAL)
- Muhammad Asif (PAK)
- John Astley (ENG)
- Justin Astley (ENG)
- Au Chi-wai (HKG)
- Mina Awad (EGY) (Note: Current tour player Mina Awad does not yet have an article, but has been added to the WST players' list.)

== B ==
- Bai Langning (CHN) (Note: Bai Langning was banned until 6 August 2025.)
- Bai Yulu (CHN)
- Sam Baird (ENG)
- Roger Bales (ENG)
- June Banks (ENG)
- Mateusz Baranowski (POL)
- John Barrie (ENG)
- Maureen Baynton (ENG)
- John Bear (CAN)
- Simon Bedford (ENG)
- Bernard Bennett (ENG)
- Mark Bennett (WAL)
- Connor Benzey (ENG)
- Bi Zhu Qing (CHN)
- Stuart Bingham (ENG)
- Jonathan Birch (ENG)
- Ian Black (SCO)
- Iulian Boiko (UKR)
- Josh Boileau (IRL)
- Antony Bolsover (ENG)
- Matthew Bolton (AUS)
- Nigel Bond (ENG)
- Emma Bonney (ENG)
- Alex Borg (MLT)
- Mark Boyle (SCO)
- Luca Brecel (BEL)
- Karl Broughton (ENG)
- Albert Brown (ENG)
- Alec Brown (ENG)
- Jordan Brown (NIR)
- Oliver Brown (ENG)
- Wayne Brown (ENG)
- Paddy Browne (IRL)
- Shawn Budd (AUS)
- Alfie Burden (ENG)
- Jamie Burnett (SCO)
- Ian Burns (ENG)
- Karl Burrows (ENG)
- Craig Butler (ENG)

== C ==
- James Cahill (ENG)
- Vinnie Calabrese (AUS)
- Duncan Campbell (SCO)
- John Campbell (AUS)
- Marcus Campbell (SCO)
- Steve Campbell (ENG)
- Aaron Canavan (JEY)
- Tammy Cantoni (AUS)
- Cao Xinlong (CHN)
- Cao Yupeng (CHN)
- Thelma Carpenter (ENG)
- Tom Carpenter (ENG)
- Stuart Carrington (ENG)
- Ali Carter (ENG)
- Ashley Carty (ENG)
- Billy Castle (ENG)
- Maria Catalano (ENG)
- Paul Cavney (ENG)
- Ishpreet Singh Chadha (IND)
- Franky Chan (HKG)
- Chan Wai Ki (HKG)
- Harvey Chandler (ENG)
- Manan Chandra (IND)
- Anuja Chandra-Thakur (IND)
- Chang Bingyu (CHN) (Note: Chang Bingyu was banned until 7 December 2024.)
- Panchaya Channoi (THA)
- Bob Chaperon (CAN)
- Tony Chappel (WAL)
- Eddie Charlton (AUS)
- Chen Feilong (CHN)
- Chen Zhe (CHN)
- Chen Zifan (CHN) (Note: Chen Zifan is banned until 20 December 2027 (in 1 year, 28 days).)
- George Chenier (CAN)
- Cheung Ka Wai (HKG)
- Martin Clark (ENG)
- Rhys Clark (SCO)
- Ryan Clark (ENG)
- Jamie Clarke (WAL)
- Eva Collins (ENG)
- Wayne Cooper (ENG)
- Albert Cope (ENG)
- Jamie Cope (ENG)
- Gareth Coppack (WAL)
- Karen Corr (NIR)
- Matthew Couch (ENG)
- Sam Craigie (ENG)
- Stephen Craigie (ENG)
- Graham Cripsey (ENG)
- Leone Crowley (IRL)
- Jeff Cundy (ENG)
- Jamie Curtis-Barrett (ENG)

== D ==
- Dominic Dale (WAL)
- Brijesh Damani (IND)
- Mike Darrington (ENG)
- Agnes Davies (WAL)
- Alex Davies (ENG)
- Anthony Davies (WAL)
- Liam Davies (WAL)
- Paul Davies (WAL)
- Fred Davis (ENG)
- Joe Davis (ENG)
- Mark Davis (ENG)
- Steve Davis (ENG)
- Paul Davison (ENG)
- Ryan Day (WAL)
- Joe Delaney (IRL)
- Patrick Delsemme (BEL)
- Deng Haohui (CHN)
- Tom Dennis (ENG)
- Corey Deuel (USA)
- Peter Devlin (ENG)
- Ding Junhui (CHN)
- Les Dodd (ENG)
- Ken Doherty (IRL)
- Scott Donaldson (SCO)
- Walter Donaldson (SCO)
- Jim Donnelly (SCO)
- Mostafa Dorgham (EGY)
- Graeme Dott (SCO) (Note: Graeme Dott was suspended on 9 April 2025, and his WPBSA membership was revoked on 24 August 2026.)
- Tony Drago (MLT)
- Adam Duffy (ENG)
- Steve Duggan (ENG)
- Kurt Dunham (AUS)
- Mike Dunn (ENG)
- Spencer Dunn (ENG)
- John Dunning (ENG)
- Nick Dyson (ENG)

== E ==
- Peter Ebdon (ENG)
- Ray Edmonds (ENG)
- Patrick Einsle (GER)
- Mahmoud El Hareedy (EGY)
- Basem Eltahhan (EGY)
- Dylan Emery (WAL)
- Laura Evans (WAL)
- Reanne Evans (ENG)
- Clive Everton (ENG)

== F ==
- Patsy Fagan (IRL)
- Fan Zhengyi (CHN)
- Fang Xiongman (CHN)
- Ann-Marie Farren (ENG)
- Jason Ferguson (ENG)
- Leo Fernandez (IRL)
- Igor Figueiredo (BRA)
- Kacper Filipiak (POL)
- David Finbow (ENG)
- Allison Fisher (ENG)
- Kelly Fisher (ENG)
- Mandy Fisher (ENG)
- Mick Fisher (ENG)
- Jack Fitzmaurice (ENG)
- Robby Foldvari (AUS)
- Tom Ford (ENG)
- Sue Foster (ENG)
- Geoff Foulds (ENG)
- Neal Foulds (ENG)
- Danny Fowler (ENG)
- Manuel Francisco (RSA)
- Peter Francisco (RSA)
- Silvino Francisco (RSA)
- Sidney Fry (ENG)
- Marco Fu (HKG)
- Fung Kwok Wai (HKG)

== G ==
- Gao Yang (CHN)
- Roger Garrett (ENG)
- Marcel Gauvreau (CAN)
- Michael Georgiou (CYP)
- Mario Geudens (BEL)
- Dave Gilbert (ENG)
- David Gilbert (ENG)
- Nigel Gilbert (ENG)
- Peter Gilchrist (SGP)
- Colm Gilcreest (IRL)
- John Giles (ENG)
- Surinder Gill (ENG)
- Ian Glover (ENG)
- Rodney Goggins (IRL)
- Brady Gollan (CAN)
- Gong Chenzhi (CHN)
- Martin Gould (ENG)
- David Grace (ENG)
- Robbie Grace (RSA)
- Liam Graham (SCO)
- David Gray (ENG)
- Mark Gray (ENG)
- David Greaves (ENG)
- Joe Grech (MLT)
- Gerard Greene (NIR)
- Terry Griffiths (WAL)
- Adrian Gunnell (ENG)
- Guo Hua (CHN)
- Kreishh Gurbaxani (IND)

== H ==
- Mike Hallett (ENG)
- Steven Hallworth (ENG)
- Anthony Hamilton (ENG)
- Ben Hancorn (ENG)
- Bjorn Haneveer (BEL)
- Quinten Hann (AUS)
- John Hargreaves (ENG)
- Dave Harold (ENG)
- Bob Harris (ENG)
- Vic Harris (ENG)
- Ruth Harrison (ENG)
- Barry Hawkins (ENG)
- Muriel Hazeldene (ENG)
- He Guoqiang (CHN)
- Louis Heathcote (ENG)
- Kristján Helgason (ISL)
- Euan Henderson (SCO)
- Stephen Hendry (SCO)
- Katie Henrick (ENG)
- Drew Henry (SCO)
- Andy Hicks (ENG)
- Alex Higgins (NIR)
- John Higgins (SCO)
- Andrew Higginson (ENG)
- Liam Highfield (ENG)
- Aaron Hill (IRL)
- Darryl Hill (IOM)
- Stacey Hillyard (ENG)
- Kishan Hirani (WAL)
- Chandra Hirjee (IND)
- David Hogan (IRL)
- Rita Holmes (ENG)
- Herbert Holt (ENG)
- Michael Holt (ENG)
- Graham Horne (SCO)
- Lynette Horsburgh (SCO)
- Pat Houlihan (ENG)
- Huang Jiahao (CHN)
- Declan Hughes (NIR)
- Eugene Hughes (IRL)
- Ashley Hugill (ENG)
- Robin Hull (FIN)
- Paul Hunter (ENG)
- Mehmet Husnu (CYP)

== I ==
- Mohamed Ibrahim (EGY)
- Lisa Ingall (ENG)
- Melbourne Inman (ENG)
- Jaique Ip (HKG)
- Asjad Iqbal (PAK)

== J ==
- Himanshu Jain (IND)
- Steve James (ENG)
- Wendy Jans (BEL)
- Rafał Jewtuch (POL)
- Jiang Jun (CHN)
- Jin Long (CHN)
- Shailesh Jogia (ENG)
- Kuldesh Johal (ENG)
- David John (WAL)
- Dilwyn John (WAL)
- Joe Johnson (ENG)
- Mark Johnston-Allen (ENG)
- Bradley Jones (ENG)
- Duane Jones (WAL)
- Hannah Jones (WAL)
- Jak Jones (WAL)
- Jamie Jones (WAL)
- Tony Jones (ENG)
- Wayne Jones (WAL)
- Frank Jonik (CAN)
- Mark Joyce (ENG)
- Ju Reti (CHN)
- Ben Judge (AUS)
- Michael Judge (IRL)

== K ==
- Issara Kachaiwong (THA)
- Amee Kamani (IND)
- Daniel Kandi (DNK)
- Jack Karnehm (ENG)
- Anton Kazakov (UKR)
- Boonyarit Keattikun (THA)
- Julie Kelly (IRL)
- Jenson Kendrick (ENG)
- Rebecca Kenna (ENG)
- Kingsley Kennerley (ENG)
- Christopher Keogan (ENG)
- Mohamed Khairy (EGY)
- Mark King (ENG) (Note: Mark King was suspended on 18 March 2023, and is banned until 17 March 2028 (in 1 year, 116 days).)
- Warren King (AUS)
- Lukas Kleckers (GER)
- Tony Knowles (ENG)
- Antoni Kowalski (POL)

== L ==
- Sanderson Lam (ENG)
- Lan Yuhao (CHN)
- John Lardner (SCO)
- Michael Larkov (UKR)
- Rod Lawler (ENG)
- Fred Lawrence (ENG)
- James Leadbetter (ENG)
- Julien Leclercq (BEL)
- Andy Lee (HKG)
- Stephen Lee (ENG) (Note: Stephen Lee was banned until 12 October 2024.)
- Sydney Lee (ENG)
- Lei Peifan (CHN)
- Sue LeMaich (CAN)
- Steve Lemmens (BEL)
- Margaret Lennan (SCO)
- Kritsanut Lertsattayathorn (THA)
- Michael Leslie (SCO)
- Li Hang (CHN) (Note: Li Hang was given a lifetime ban on 6 June 2023.)
- Li Yan (CHN)
- Li Yuan (CHN)
- Liang Wenbo (CHN) (Note: Liang Wenbo was given a lifetime ban on 6 June 2023.)
- Simon Lichtenberg (GER)
- David Lilley (ENG)
- Lim Kok Leong (MAS)
- Horace Lindrum (AUS)
- Oliver Lines (ENG)
- Peter Lines (ENG)
- Jack Lisowski (ENG)
- Liu Chuang (CHN)
- Liu Hongyu (CHN)
- Liu Song (CHN)
- Liu Wenwei (CHN) (Note: Liu Wenwei was suspended on 22 November 2026.)
- Liu Yang (CHN) (Note: Current tour player Liu Yang does not yet have an article, but has been added to the WST players' list.)
- Long Zehuang (CHN)
- Steve Longworth (ENG)
- Lu Ning (CHN) (Note: Lu Ning is banned until 6 April 2028 (in 1 year, 136 days).)
- Lü Chenwei (CHN)
- Luo Honghao (CHN)
- Luo Zetao (CHN)
- Jonas Luz (BRA)
- Lyu Haotian (CHN)

== M ==
- Ma Hailong (CHN)
- Craig MacGillivray (SCO)
- Scott MacKenzie (SCO)
- Murdo MacLeod (SCO)
- Sean Maddocks (ENG)
- Kurt Maflin (NOR)
- Chitra Magimairaj (IND)
- Stephen Maguire (SCO)
- Atthasit Mahitthi (THA)
- Rouzi Maimaiti (CHN)
- Marlon Manalo (PHL)
- Alec Mann (ENG)
- Mitchell Mann (ENG)
- Stuart Mann (ENG)
- Perrie Mans (RSA)
- Bob Marshall (AUS)
- Robert Marshall (ENG)
- Dave Martin (ENG)
- Youssra Matine (MAR)
- Anna Mazhirina (RUS)
- Stefan Mazrocis (NED)
- James McBain (SCO)
- Chris McBreen (NZL)
- Clark McConachy (NZL)
- Maryann McConnell (CAN)
- Ian McCulloch (ENG)
- Anthony McGill (SCO)
- Robbie McGuigan (NIR)
- Lesley McIlrath (AUS)
- Jack McLaughlin (NIR)
- David McLellan (SCO)
- Rory McLeod (JAM)
- Alan McManus (SCO)
- Paul McPhillips (SCO)
- Jim Meadowcroft (ENG)
- Paul Medati (ENG)
- Aditya Mehta (IND)
- Mei Xiwen (CHN)
- Babken Melkonyan (ARM)
- Chris Melling (ENG)
- Shaun Mellish (ENG)
- Dean Mellway (CAN)
- Tony Meo (ENG)
- Yasin Merchant (IND)
- Hanna Mergies (POL)
- Ben Mertens (BEL)
- Hammad Miah (ENG)
- Jimmy Michie (ENG)
- Paul Mifsud (MLT)
- Steve Mifsud (AUS)
- Graham Miles (ENG)
- Robert Milkins (ENG)
- Steve Mizerak (USA)
- Moh Keen Hoo (MAS)
- Saleh Mohammad (AFG)
- Stan Moody (ENG)
- Brian Morgan (ENG)
- Darren Morgan (WAL)
- Paddy Morgan (AUS)
- Mario Morra (CAN)
- David Morris (IRL)
- Doug Mountjoy (WAL)
- Ross Muir (SCO)
- Vincent Muldoon (IRL)
- Lasse Münstermann (GER)
- Shaun Murphy (ENG)
- Stephen Murphy (IRL)
- Terry Murphy (NIR)
- Tommy Murphy (NIR)

== N ==
- Chatchapong Nasa (THA)
- Sahil Nayyar (CAN)
- Anastasia Nechaeva (RUS)
- Steve Newbury (WAL)
- Stanley Newman (ENG)
- Tom Newman (ENG)
- Ng On-yee (HKG)
- Niu Zhuang (CHN)
- Chris Norbury (ENG)
- Andrew Norman (ENG)
- Paul Norris (ENG)
- Florian Nüßle (AUT)
- Mink Nutcharut (THA)

== O ==
- Joe O'Boye (IRL)
- Fergal O'Brien (IRL)
- Joe O'Connor (ENG)
- Martin O'Donnell (ENG)
- Brendan O'Donoghue (IRL)
- Dene O'Kane (NZL)
- Phil O'Kane (ENG)
- Bill Oliver (ENG)
- Jamie O'Neill (ENG)
- Ronnie O'Sullivan (ENG)
- Sean O'Sullivan (ENG)
- Gary Owen (AUS)
- Marcus Owen (WAL)
- Ken Owers (ENG)

== P ==
- Jackson Page (WAL)
- Lee Page (ENG)
- Andrew Pagett (WAL)
- Alex Pagulayan (CAN)
- Munraj Pal (ENG)
- Pang Junxu (CHN)
- Pang Weiguo (CHN)
- Kathy Parashis (AUS)
- Emma Parker (ENG)
- Maurice Parkin (ENG)
- John Parrott (ENG)
- Riley Parsons (ENG)
- Fraser Patrick (SCO)
- Karl Payne (ENG)
- Nick Pearce (ENG)
- Peng Yisong (CHN)
- Joe Perry (ENG)
- Andres Petrov (EST)
- Stuart Pettman (ENG)
- Manasawin Phetmalaikul (THA)
- Phaitoon Phonbun (THA)
- Tai Pichit (THA)
- Vidya Pillai (IND)
- Barry Pinches (ENG)
- Haydon Pinhey (ENG)
- Gary Ponting (ENG)
- Dechawat Poomjaeng (THA)
- Kwan Poomjang (THA)
- Ashot Potikyan (RUS)
- Ian Preece (WAL)
- Steve Prest (ENG)
- Mick Price (ENG)
- Jason Prince (NIR)
- Kelsall Prince (ENG)
- Liam Pullen (ENG)
- John Pulman (ENG)

== Q ==
- Lisa Quick (ENG)
- Fergal Quinn (NIR)
- Michael Quinn (AUS)

== R ==
- Jackie Rea (NIR)
- John Rea (SCO)
- John Read (ENG)
- Ray Reardon (WAL)
- Stuart Reardon (ENG)
- Tyler Rees (WAL)
- Bulcsú Révész (HUN)
- Dean Reynolds (ENG)
- Cliff Rickard (AUS)
- Anita Rizzuti (NOR)
- Lewis Roberts (ENG)
- Jimmy Robertson (ENG)
- Neil Robertson (AUS)
- Alain Robidoux (CAN)
- David Roe (ENG)
- Adrian Rosa (ENG)
- Colin Roscoe (WAL)
- Stephen Rowlings (ENG)

== S ==
- Noppon Saengkham (THA)
- Supoj Saenla (THA)
- Ahmed Saif (QAT)
- Brian Salmon (ENG)
- Arantxa Sanchis (IND)
- Noppadol Sangnil (THA)
- Itaro Santos (BRA)
- Brandon Sargeant (ENG)
- Amir Sarkhosh (IRN)
- Chris Scanlon (ENG)
- Diana Schuler (GER)
- George Scott (ENG)
- Mark Selby (ENG)
- Vera Selby (ENG)
- Matthew Selt (ENG)
- Geet Sethi (IND)
- Eden Sharav (ISR)
- Kim Shaw (ENG)
- Troy Shaw (ENG)
- Dessie Sheehan (IRL)
- Mohammed Shehab (UAE)
- Michael Shelton (ENG)
- Shi Chunxia (CHN)
- Shi Hanqing (CHN)
- Yana Shut (BLR)
- Si Jiahui (CHN)
- Sakchai Sim Ngam (THA)
- Luke Simmonds (ENG)
- Warren Simpson (AUS)
- Eddie Sinclair (SCO)
- Baipat Siripaporn (THA)
- Elliot Slessor (ENG)
- Chris Small (SCO)
- Fred Smith (ENG)
- Jason Smith (ENG)
- Martin Smith (ENG)
- Sidney Smith (ENG)
- Willie Smith (ENG)
- Billy Snaddon (SCO)
- John Spencer (ENG)
- Lee Spick (ENG)
- Diana Stateczny (GER)
- Craig Steadman (ENG)
- Adam Stefanow (POL)
- Natalie Stelmach (CAN)
- Robert Stephen (SCO)
- Kirk Stevens (CAN)
- Matthew Stevens (WAL)
- Harry Stokes (SCO)
- Roy Stolk (NED)
- Sean Storey (ENG)
- Waratthanun Sukritthanes (THA)
- Zak Surety (ENG)
- Passakorn Suwannawat (THA)
- Joe Swail (NIR)
- Oliver Sykes (ENG)
- Michał Szubarczyk (POL)

== T ==
- Haris Tahir (PAK)
- James Tatton (ENG)
- Allan Taylor (ENG)
- David Taylor (ENG)
- Dennis Taylor (NIR)
- Nick Terry (ENG)
- Suzie Terry (ENG)
- Thanawat Tirapongpaiboon (THA) (Note: Thanawat Tirapongpaiboon was banned until 14 March 2025.)
- Ryan Thomerson (AUS)
- Rory Thor (MAS)
- Cliff Thorburn (CAN)
- Willie Thorne (ENG)
- Paul Thornley (CAN)
- Tian Pengfei (CHN)
- Chris Totten (SCO)
- Judd Trump (ENG)

== U ==
- R Umadevi Nagaraj (IND)
- Thepchaiya Un-Nooh (THA)
- Alexander Ursenbacher (SUI)

== V ==
- Hossein Vafaei (IRN)
- Soheil Vahedi (IRN)
- Kevin Van Hove (BEL)
- Jimmy van Rensberg (RSA)
- Fred Van Rensburg (RSA)
- Tatjana Vasiljeva (LVA)
- Lucky Vatnani (IND)
- John Virgo (ENG)

== W ==
- Chris Wakelin (ENG)
- Caroline Walch (ENG)
- Ricky Walden (ENG)
- Joel Walker (ENG)
- Lee Walker (WAL)
- Nick Walker (ENG)
- Patrick Wallace (NIR)
- Katrina Wan (HKG)
- Wang Yuchen (HKG)
- Wang Xinbo (CHN)
- Michael Wasley (ENG)
- Paul Watchorn (IRL)
- James Wattana (THA)
- Mike Watterson (ENG)
- Daniel Wells (WAL)
- Bill Werbeniuk (CAN)
- Barry West (ENG)
- Jason Weston (ENG)
- Jimmy White (ENG)
- Michael White (WAL) (Note: Michael White had his WPBSA membership revoked on 12 July 2024.)
- John Whitty (ENG)
- Adam Wicheard (ENG)
- Michael Wild (ENG)
- Mark Wildman (ENG)
- Gary Wilkinson (ENG)
- Glen Wilkinson (AUS)
- Mark Williams (WAL)
- Philip Williams (WAL)
- Rex Williams (ENG)
- Robbie Williams (ENG)
- Ian Williamson (ENG)
- Cliff Wilson (WAL)
- Gary Wilson (ENG)
- Jamie Wilson (ENG)
- Kyren Wilson (ENG)
- Sydney Wilson (ENG)
- Bogdan Wołkowski (POL)
- Rochelle Woods (ENG)
- Ben Woollaston (ENG)
- Jon Wright (ENG)
- Wu Yize (CHN)
- Wu Yu Lun (TPE)
- Jim Wych (CAN)
- Paul Wykes (ENG)

== X ==
- Xiao Guodong (CHN)
- Xing Zihao (CHN)
- Xu Si (CHN)
- Xu Yichen (CHN)

== Y ==
- Yan Bingtao (CHN) (Note: Yan Bingtao is banned until 11 December 2027 (in 1 year, 19 days).)
- Yao Pengcheng (CHN)
- Hatem Yassen (EGY)
- Ratchayothin Yotharuck (THA)
- Dean Young (SCO)
- Muhammad Yousaf (PAK)
- Yu Delu (CHN) (Note: Yu Delu is banned until 24 February 2029 (in 2 years, 94 days).)
- Yuan Sijun (CHN)

== Z ==
- Zhang Anda (CHN)
- Zhang Jiankang (CHN) (Note: Zhang Jiankang was banned until 1 December 2025.)
- Zhang Yong (CHN)
- Zhao Hanyang (CHN)
- Zhao Jianbo (CHN) (Note: Zhao Jianbo was banned until 7 April 2025.)
- Zhao Xintong (CHN) (Note: Zhao Xintong was banned until 1 September 2024.)
- Zhou Yuelong (CHN)
- Artemijs Žižins (LVA)
