= Women's Professional Snooker Championship =

Women's snooker championship, 1934–1950

Tournament information
- Location: London
- Country: England
- Established: 1934
- Organisation(s): Women's Billiards Association
- Format: Single elimination
- Final year: 1950
- Final champion: Thelma Carpenter

The Women's Professional Snooker Championship was a snooker tournament organised by the Women's Billiards Association. Held ten times, the event was first played from 1934 to 1941, and again from 1947 to 1950. Across all ten editions, only four players reached the final. Ruth Harrison won eight of the events, with Agnes Morris and Thelma Carpenter winning the others.

The Women's Billiards Association was established in 1931, and instituted an amateur snooker tournament two years later, after initiating championships for English billiards. Their professional snooker championship was first held in 1934, and was open to players from England, Northern Ireland, Scotland, Wales, and the Irish Free State. At the time, women's snooker gained less coverage than women's English billiards.

Harrison, who won the inaugural title, had started playing the game two years earlier. In the semi-final, she eliminated her coach Eva Collins. In the final, she defeated Joyce Gardner, as she had in the final of the Women's Professional Billiards Championship a few days earlier. Harrison won each instance of the annual event to 1940, and claimed her eighth title when the tournament was re-established in 1947, after it had been suspended during World War II. She did not participate in the 1949 tournament as she felt that holding the event in June meant it would fall outside of the annual snooker season, and only Carpenter and Morris entered for the 1950 championship.

The first tournaments were held at Burroughes Hall, London, and the events from 1947 took place at Leicester Square Hall, London. The last time that the tournament was held, in 1950, Carpenter took the title, a few days after winning the World Women's Billiards Championship event. Gardner and Carpenter were the only two entries for the 1951 championship, which was due to be staged at the Albright and Wilson Recreation Club in Langley, but Gardner withdrew because of her mother's illness, and that year's event was cancelled. The 1950 event proved to be the last time the tournament was held, as public interest in the contest declined.

The Women's World Open in 1976 and 1980 were later recognised as the first editions of the World Women's Snooker Championship. Gardner, three-times Women's Professional Snooker Championship runner-up, was the top seed in 1976, and Morris, the 1949 champion, reached the final in 1980.

== Tournaments ==
Women's Professional Snooker Championship finals
Year	Winner	Runner-up	Final score	Venue	Notes	Ref(s).
1934	Ruth Harrison	Joyce Gardner	7–6	Burroughes Hall	There were five entrants. Ruth Harrison defeated Irene Armes 3–0 in the first round match, and then eliminated Eva Collins 7–2 in the semi-finals. In the other semi-final, Joyce Gardner whitewashed Rose Bradley 9–0. Gardner led 6–2 in the final, but Harrison took the next five frames to secure the title.	
1935	Ruth Harrison	Joyce Gardner	7–5	Burroughes Hall	There were three entrants. Harrison defeated Thelma Carpenter 5–1 in the semi-final and won 7–5 against Gardner in the final.	
1936	Ruth Harrison	Thelma Carpenter	7–3	Burroughes Hall	There were four entrants. Harrison won 5–1 against Collins in one semi-final, and Carpenter defeated Gardner by the same score in the other. Harrison claimed the title with a 7 -3 victory against Carpenter.	
1937	Ruth Harrison	Joyce Gardner	9–4	Burroughes Hall	There were four entrants. Gardner secured a decisive lead at 5–1 against Margaret Lennan, and won 5–4 after dead frames; and Harrison eliminated Carpenter 8–1. Harrison won the title by defeating Gardner 9–4 in the final.	
1938	Ruth Harrison	Thelma Carpenter	11–2	Burroughes Hall	There were five entrants. Carpenter defeated Gardner 3–2 in the first round, and then eliminated Barbara Meston 6–3 in the semi-finals. Harrison won by the same score against Margaret Lennan in the other semi-final. The final saw Harrison defeat Carpenter 11–2.	
1939	Ruth Harrison	Thelma Carpenter	8–5	Burroughes Hall	There were five entrants, but Joyce Gardner withdrew due to influenza, giving Carpenter a walkover to the final. G.I. Rowley eliminated Barbara Meston 3–2 in the first round, before losing 0–9 to Harrison. Harrison defeated Carpenter 8–5 and won her sixth title.	
1940	Ruth Harrison	Agnes Morris	11–2	Burroughes Hall	There were five entrants. Agnes Morris defeated Margaret Lennan 3–2 in the first round, and then received a bye to the final as Gardner withdrew because her husband was ill. Harrison won 8–1 against Barbara Meston. After the first day of the final, Harrison led 6–2 against Davies and needed only one frame to win. She took the ninth frame 54–38 to secure the title. Four further frames were played, all of which Harrison won.	
1941–1947	No tournament held					
1948	Ruth Harrison	Agnes Morris	16–14	Leicester Square Hall	There were four entrants. In the first round, Agnes Morris eliminated Gardner 16–5 and Carpenter won against Meston by the same score. Morris then defeated Carpenter 11–10 in the playoff to determine who would face Harrison in the final. Harrison won the title at 16–10; Morris took the four dead frames, leaving the final score 16–14.	
1949	Agnes Morris	Thelma Carpenter	16–15	Leicester Square Hall	There were three entrants. In the semi-final, Thelma Carpenter eliminated Joyce Gardner 20–11. Carpenter won nine consecutive frames (from the 8th to the 16th) and at one point was leading 15–5. The highest break of the match was 37 by Carpenter. In the final, Carpenter led Morris 4–1 after the first session; after two sessions, the pair were level at 5–5, and two sessions later were again on equal terms at 10–10. They were tied at 15–15, which forced a deciding frame. Morris then compiled the highest break of the match, 33, and took the 31st frame to win the championship.	
1950	Thelma Carpenter	Agnes Morris	20–10	Leicester Square Hall	There were only two entrants. Carpenter defeated Morris 20–10, after achieving a winning margin at 16–7.	

== Finalist statistics ==
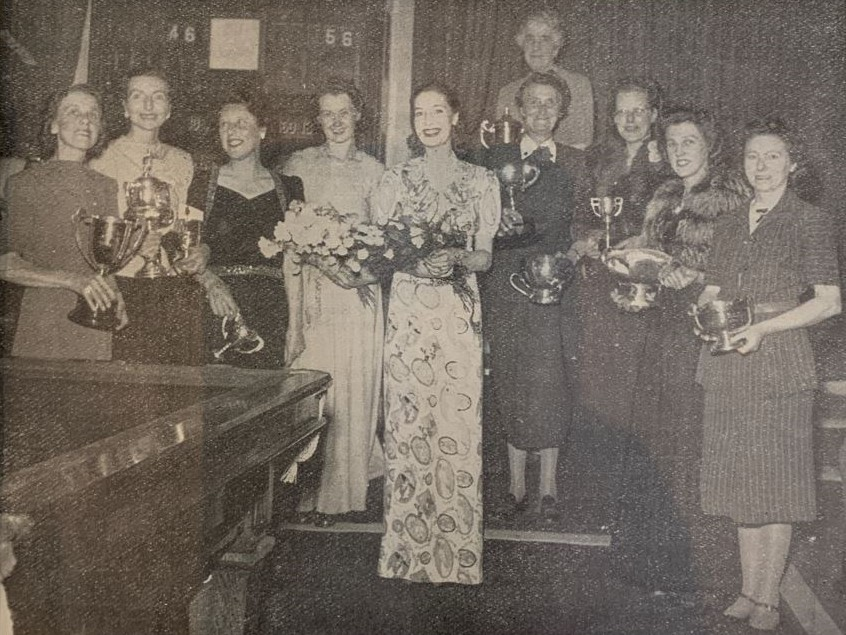
Women's Billiards Association awards 1948. Pictured, (left to right), are Ruth Harrison, Thelma Carpenter, Joyce Gardner, Agnes Morris, Valerie Hobson, Evelyn Morland-Smith, Beryl Stamper, Joan Adcock, E. Peters. Back row: Gladys Burton

Women's Professional Snooker Championship final statistics
Rank	Name	Country	Champion	Runner-up
1	Ruth Harrison	England	8	0
2	Thelma Carpenter	England	1	4
3	Agnes Morris	Wales	1	3
4	Joyce Gardner	England	0	3

== See also ==
- Women's Billiards Association, the governing body for the Women's Professional Snooker Championship
- World Women's Snooker Championship, established in 1976
