= Snooker lists =

Here are many different lists associated with snooker.

== Lists of players ==
- List of snooker players, a list of professional players from all eras
- List of world snooker champions
- List of snooker players by number of ranking titles
- List of snooker world number ones
- List of snooker players with over 100 century breaks

== Other lists ==
- Glossary of cue sports terms
- List of snooker referees
- List of snooker tournaments
- Maximum break § List of official maximum breaks
