= 1980 Women's World Open (snooker) =

Women's snooker event, held May 1980

Tournament information
- Dates: May 1980
- Venue: Warners Sinah Warren Holiday Camp
- City: Hayling Island
- Country: England
- Organisation: Women's Billiards Association
- Format: Single elimination
- Winner's share: £700

Final
- Champion: Lesley McIlrath (AUS)
- Runner-up: Agnes Davies (WAL)
- Score: 4–2

The 1980 Women's World Open was a women's snooker tournament that took place in May 1980 at Warners Sinah Warren Holiday Camp, Hayling Island, organised by the Women's Billiards Association and sponsored by Guinness. It is recognised as the 1980 edition of the World Women's Snooker Championship first held in 1976. Lesley McIlrath defeated Agnes Davies 4–2 in the final to win the title, receiving £700 prize money as champion. Davies received £350 as runner-up.

This was the first championship to be held since the inaugural event in 1976, and attracted 46 entrants. Defending champion Vera Selby was beaten 2–3 in the quarter-finals by Ann Johnson. Davies, who had won the Women's Professional Snooker Championship in 1949, reached the final by beating Natalie Stelmach 3–0 in the semi-final. McIlrath was the only world women's snooker championship winner from outside the United Kingdom until 2015.

== Main Draw ==
Quarter-finals; Best of 5 frames
(England) Vera Selby	2
(England) Ann Johnson	3
(Australia) Lesley McIlrath	3
(Canada) Maryann McConnell	1
(Wales) Agnes Davies	3
(Australia) Fran Lovis	2
(Canada) Natalie Stelmach	3
(England) Sue Foster	2

Semi-finals; Best of 5 frames
(England) Ann Johnson	1
(Australia) Lesley McIlrath	3
(Wales) Agnes Davies	3
(Canada) Natalie Stelmach	0

Final; Best of 7 frames
(Australia) Lesley McIlrath	4
(Wales) Agnes Davies	2
