= Crowson =

Crowson is an Irish surname. Originally derived from the Gaelic surname Mac an Chrosáin. Meaning "Son of a Rhymer" a Triconnell family of Druid Bards. Which were Musicians, Poets and Philosophers and Nobleman in The Kingdom of Uí Fháilghe. They were Bards to the notable Clan O'Moore (O'Mordha) which was a leading sept of the 'Seven Clans of Leix'. Many variations of the name exist. Scribes and church officials, lacking today's standardized spelling rules, recorded names by how they were pronounced. This imprecise guide often led to the misleading result of one person's name being recorded under several different spellings. Numerous spelling variations of the surname Crowson are preserved in documents of the family history. The various spellings of the name that were found include Crosby, Crossan, Crossen, McCrossan, McCrossen, MacCrossan, MacCrossin, MacCrossen, Crossin, MacCrosson, McCrosson, Crosson, McCrosin, McCrosen and many more.

Notable people with the surname include:

- Lamar Crowson (1926–1998), American pianist
- Lyscum Elbert Crowson (1903–1993), Methodist preacher
- Nicholas Crowson, academic historian
- Roy Crowson (1914–1999), British entomologist
- Tom Crowson, American politician
- Woody Crowson (1918–1947), American Major League Baseball pitcher
