= Women's Professional Billiards Championship =

Annual English billiards tournament (1930–1950)

Tournament information
- Country: England
- Established: 1930
- Organisation(s): Burroughes and Watts (1930–31); Women's Billiards Association (1932–50)
- Final year: 1950
- Final champion: Thelma Carpenter

The Women's Professional Billiards Championship was an English billiards tournament held from 1930 to 1950. The tournament was first organised by Burroughes and Watts in 1930 and 1931, before the WBA ran the event until its conclusion in 1950. Joyce Gardner won the tournament on seven of the fourteen times that it was held, and was runner-up six times; the only time that she was not in the final was the 1940 tournament. The other players to hold the title were Thelma Carpenter who won four times, and Ruth Harrison who took three championship titles. Harrison's break of 197 in 1937 remains a women's record in competitive billiards.

The first six tournaments were held at Burroughes Hall in London. Apart from in 1939, when it was again at Burroughes Hall, all the subsequent editions were played at Thurston's Hall, which was closed due to bomb damage in 1940 and reopened in 1947 as Leicester Square Hall.

== History ==
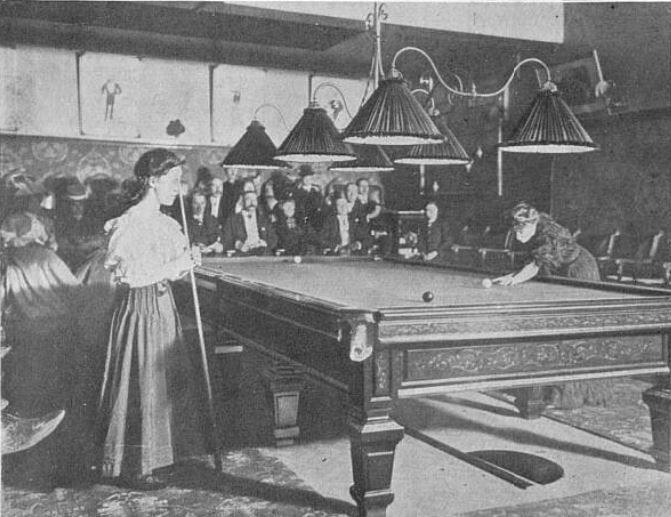
English Billiards match between Mme Strebor (in play) and Eva Collins at Burroughes Hall in 1906. Collins was twice runner-up in the Women's Professional Billiards Championship

Although there were female players of cue sports since the games were invented, their progress in the game has been held back by sexism, with men typically not taking female players seriously, or claiming that the women were seeking male attention by playing. (Note: More recently, the 2018 World Women's Billiards Championship runner-up Rebecca Kenna was prevented from playing in her local snooker league in 2019, on the basis of her sex. The same year, in Kuwait, journalist Nawara Fattahova reported that women had been banned from her local billiard hall. A research study published in 2021 looking at attitudes to 14 sports in China concluded that billiard sports were perceived as "hypermasculine".)

In the mid-19th century, few women played cue sports, but they became more popular among wealthy women across Europe towards the end of the century. In 1905, John Roberts Jr. announced that he would be promoting a "Madame Strebor" as a professional; Strebor played Eva Collins in an English billiards series at Burroughes Hall in 1906. The Sporting Life commented that public matches between women were unusual enough that the series was likely to attract public interest, but that "many attempts have been made to popularise the game with ladies, with results anything but flattering".

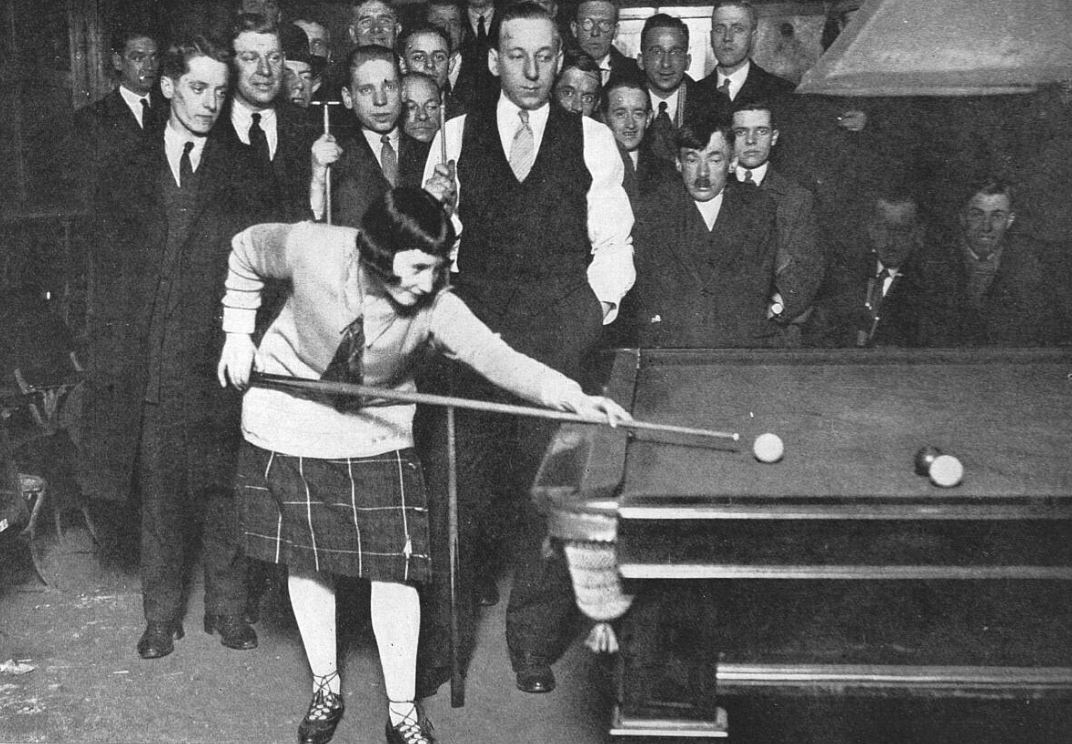
Margaret Lennan playing at a charity tournament in Liverpool in 1927

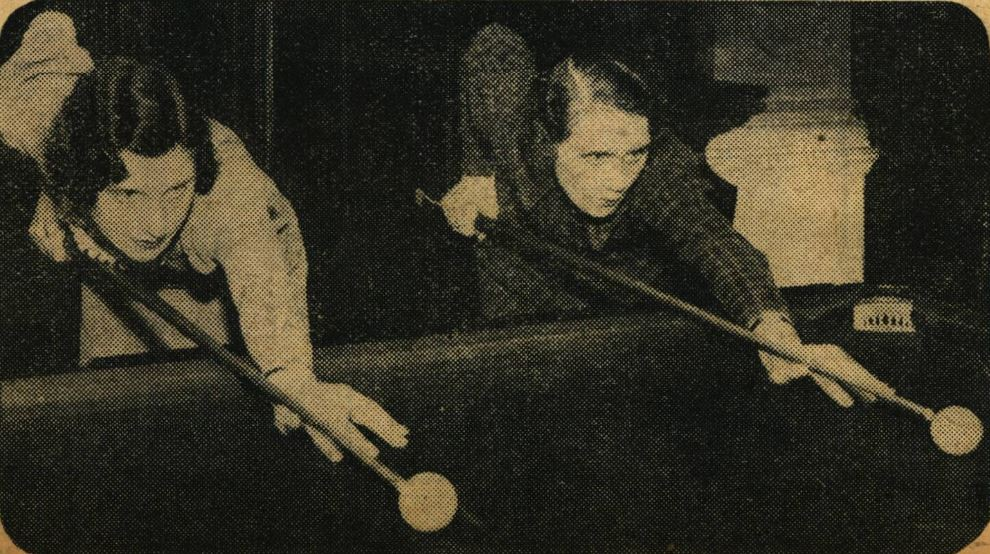
Joyce Gardner (left) and Ruth Harrison at Burroughes Hall in 1936

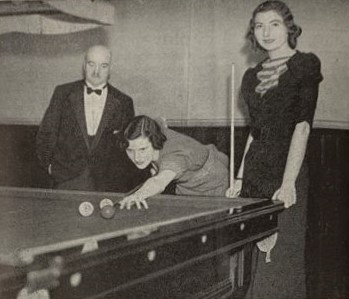
Joyce Gardner (in play) and Thelma Carpenter (right) in 1939

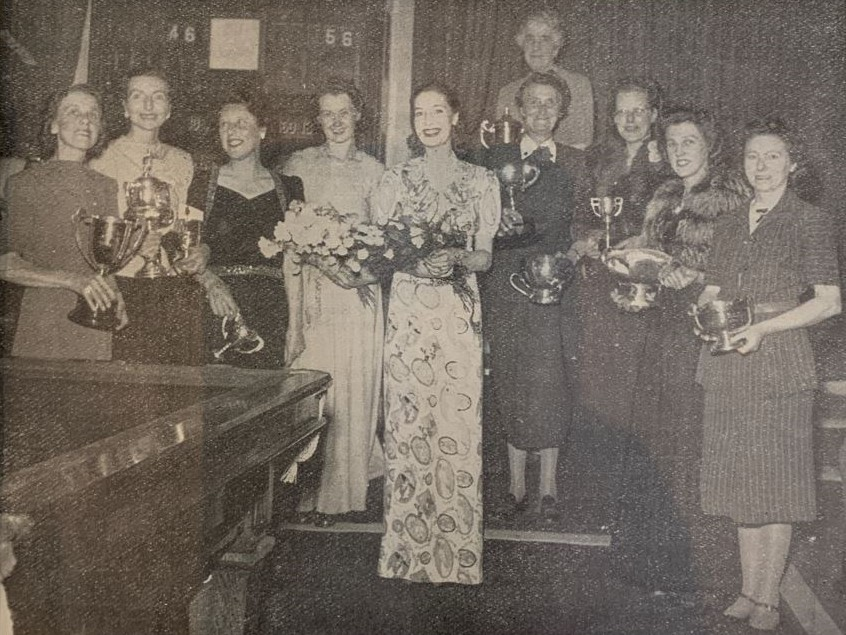
The 1948 Women's Billiards Association awards ceremony. Pictured, (left to right), are Ruth Harrison, Thelma Carpenter, Joyce Gardner, Agnes Morris, Valerie Hobson, Evelyn Morland-Smith, Beryl Stamper, Joan Adcock, E. Peters. Back row: Gladys Burton.

Margaret Lennan beat Joyce Gardner 1,000–960 at Hull in August 1928 in a 1,000-up (first to 1,000 points) English billiards match that was billed as the Ladies' Championship of England and Scotland. Billiard cloth manufacturers Howard and Powell provided a silver rose bowl for the winner. In 1930, the cue sports company Burroughes and Watts organised a British Women's Billiards Championship, also known as the Burwat Cup. Another edition was held in 1931. In 1931, the Women's Billiards Association (WBA) was formed at a meeting chaired by Teresa Billington-Greig, with the aim of controlling the amateur and professional women's championships. It was agreed with the Billiards Association and Control Council that the WBA would take over the running of the competition as a world championship from 1932, with the same trophy that was used in 1930 and 1932.

Joyce Gardner was champion each year until 1934, when Ruth Harrison won the first of her three titles. The first century break in the competition, 100, by Gardner was compiled in 1934. Lennan made two centuries, 113 and then 153 in the 1936 competition. Ruth Harrison's break of 197 in 1937 remains a women's record in competitive billiards. Thelma Carpenter won her first title in 1940, before the championship was suspended during World War II. Carpenter was champion again when the tournament was next held in 1948, and retained the title in 1949. In 1950, she was watched by her 10-year-old son as she beat Joyce Gardner to win her fourth title. This was to be the last women's professional championship to be held. The World Women's Billiards Championship is viewed as a continuation of the amateur championship rather than of the Women's Professional Billiards Championship.

== Tournaments ==
In some years the match winner was the first to reach a pre-determined points target, and in other years the winner was the player to score most points in a set playing time.

Women's Professional Billiards Championship (also known as the Burwat Cup)
Title	Year	Winner	Runner-up	Final score	Venue	Notes	Ref.
British Women's Billiards Tournament	1930	Joyce Gardner	Eva Collins	1,500–727	Burroughes Hall	There were four entrants to the event, which was called the British Women's Billiards Tournament. In the semi-finals, Joyce Gardner defeated Mrs Watts 750–259 on 31 March, and Eva Collins eliminated Muriel Barber 750–422 the following day. In the final, held on 3 April, Gardner made a break of 96.	
British Women's Billiards Tournament	1931	Joyce Gardner	Eva Collins	2,000–1,185	Burroughes Hall	There were three entrants. Gardner received a bye into the final, where she faced Collins, who defeated Muriel Barber 750–382 in the semi-final. Lady Wedgewood presented the winner's cup to Gardner.	
Women's Professional Billiards Championship	1932	Joyce Gardner	Ruth Harrison	2,000–1,713	Burroughes Hall	There were four entrants. Harrison defeated Collins 1,000–563 in one-semi-final, and Gardner recorded a 1,000–356 win against Muriel Barber in the other. The highest break of the tournament was 83 by Gardner, in the final.	
Women's Professional Billiards Championship	1933	Joyce Gardner	Ruth Harrison	2,000–1,306	Burroughes Hall	There were three entrants. Harrison received a bye into the final, and Gardner eliminated Collins 1,000–582.	
Women's Professional Billiards Championship	1934	Ruth Harrison	Joyce Gardner	2,000–1,608	Burroughes Hall	There were four entrants. Gardner made a break of 100, a record for the championship. She won 1,000–303 against Irene Armes, and Collins eliminated Collins 1,000–523 in the other semi-final.	
Women's Professional Billiards Championship	1935 (February)	Ruth Harrison	Joyce Gardner	3,000–2,708	Burroughes Hall	There were five entrants. Carpenter won 1,000–699 against Collins but was then eliminated 1,054–1,500 by Gardner. Harrison won her semi-final against Lennan 1,500–790. Harrison made two breaks of 101, the highest of the competition, and also a 99, during the final. Gardner's average score of 18.5 points per visit against Carpenter was a new Championship record.	
Women's Professional Billiards Championship	1935 (November)	Joyce Gardner	Margaret Lennan	3,000–2,872	Thurston's Hall	There were five entrants. Lennan reached the final with wins over Collins (1,000–466) and Harrison (1,500–1,098), whilst Gardner eliminated Carpenter 1,500–1,149	
Women's Professional Billiards Championship	1937	Joyce Gardner	Ruth Harrison	2,223–2,204	Thurston's Hall	There were five entrants. Harrison eliminated Collins 1,178–469 and then Lennan 2,166–1,132. Against Lennan, Harrison made breaks of 197 (the championship record), 126, and 110. Gardner defeated Carpenter 1,633–1,338 in the semi-finals and made a break of 154 in the final.	
Women's Professional Billiards Championship	1938	Joyce Gardner	Thelma Carpenter	2,313–1,824	Thurston's Hall	There were five entrants. Carpenter progressed past Lennan, 941–595, and Harrison, 1,599–1,386, to face Gardner, who eliminated Barbara Meston 1,871–979.	
Women's Professional Billiards Championship	1939	Ruth Harrison	Joyce Gardner	2,559–1,792	Burroughes Hall	There were five entrants. Carpenter eliminated Barbara Meston 1,964–905 in the heat, then lost 1,396–1,602 to Harrison. Gardner won 2,143–681 against Collins.	
Women's Professional Billiards Championship	1940	Thelma Carpenter	Ruth Harrison	2,184–1,641	Thurston's Hall	There were four entrants. Carpenter defeated Gardner 1,235–1,046 in one semi-final, and Harrison eliminated Lennan 1,613–833 in the other.	
Women's Professional Billiards Championship	1941–1947	No tournament held					
Women's Professional Billiards Championship	1948	Thelma Carpenter	Joyce Gardner	2,659–1,670	Leicester Square Hall (Note: Thurston's Hall was damaged by a bomb in October 1940. It reopened as Leicester Square Hall on 3 October 1947.)	There were three entrants. In the semi-final, Gardner defeated Harrison 1,256–1,037. Carpenter averaged 11.92 per visit to Gardner's 7.92 points in the final, and made the highest break of the tournament, 90.	
Women's Professional Billiards Championship	1949	Thelma Carpenter	Joyce Gardner	3,120–2,518	Leicester Square Hall	Cumulative scores after each session (Carpenter first) were: 328–261, 619–567, 890–801, 1,275–1,002, 1,557–1,346, 1,992–1,531, 2,162–1,795, 2,484–1,986, 2,753–2,279, 3,120–2,528. The highest break was 73, by Gardner.	
Women's Professional Billiards Championship	1950	Thelma Carpenter	Joyce Gardner	1,978–1,374	Leicester Square Hall	There were only two entrants. The end-of-session scores up to the last session (Carpenter first) were: 716–359, 1,368–792, 1,978–1,374	

== Finalist statistics ==
Appearances in the final
Rank	Name	Country	Winner	Runner-up
1	Joyce Gardner	England	7	6
2	Thelma Carpenter	England	4	1
3	Ruth Harrison	England	3	4
4	Eva Collins	England	0	2
5	Margaret Lennan	Scotland	0	1

== See also ==
- Women's Billiards Association
- World Women's Billiards Championship
