= Thelma Carpenter (billiards player) =

Female snooker and billiards player

- Carpenter in 1933

Personal information
- Born: 4 December 1911
- Died: 1998 (aged 86)

Sport
- Country: England
- Sport: Snooker
- Professional: 1934–1950

Tournament wins
- World Championship: English Billiards:1932, 1933, 1934

Thelma Carpenter (4 December 1911 – 1998) was an English player of English billiards and snooker. She won the World Ladies' Amateur Billiards Championship, now recognised as editions of the World Women's Billiards Championship, each year from 1932 to 1934. After turning professional in 1934, she won the Women's Professional Billiards Championship four times and the Women's Professional Snooker Championship once, retiring as the reigning champion of both in 1950.

She opened a billiards academy for women in 1934 and, in 1936, she was the first woman to commentate on sports for the BBC when she provided radio commentary for a billiards match. She died in 1998.

== Early life and playing career ==
Thelma Carpenter was born on 4 December 1911. She was educated at home and never attended school. She started playing billiards at the age of 15. Carpenter's father, Brodie Carpenter, owned the Solent Cliffs Hotel in Bournemouth, which had two billiards rooms. She met prominent snooker and billiards players, including Joe Davis and Clark McConachy, when they played exhibition matches at her father's hotel. Demolished in the 1970s, the site of the hotel is now the Bournemouth International Centre, which has hosted professional snooker tournaments.

McConachy, who became the World Professional Billiards Champion from 1951 until 1968, and Claude Falkiner (twice runner-up in the World Billiards Championship) both provided coaching to Carpenter, as did Welsh champion player Tom Carpenter (no relation). McConachy gifted his cue to Carpenter, although he may have regretted this; multiple-time men's professional champion Davis later said that he felt McConachy never played to his full ability again. The journalist and author Donald Trelford speculated that McConachy was "too gallant (or too stubborn or too shy)" to request the cue's return. In 1933, Carpenter wrote that she used a cue weighing 19.5 oz (550 g), which was heavier than those traditionally used by professional male players whose cues generally weighed no more than 17 oz (480 g). She felt that the extra weight of the cue helped with forcing and screw shots. When training, she practised and played for four to five hours a day.

The Women's Billiards Association (WBA) was founded in May 1931, with the objective of controlling the amateur and professional English billiards and snooker championships for women, and promoting other tournaments and competitions. Teresa Billington-Greig, who chaired the initial meeting, became acting honorary secretary, and Carpenter was among the other members appointed to the WBA Council.

Carpenter won the WBA World Ladies Amateur Billiards Championship in three consecutive years, from 1932 to 1934. There were 41 entrants in 1932, including Mrs McConachy, who was married to Clark. Carpenter defeated Ethel Brown 1,000-730 in the final. She defeated Vera Seals in the 1933 final and, after recovering from pneumonia, which she had contacted in December 1933, won the 1934 final against Seals. The World Women's Billiards Championship is viewed as a continuation of this amateur championship rather than of the Women's Professional Billiards Championship.

In December 1933, the council of the WBA announced that any players entering open events not organised or sanctioned by the WBA would be prohibited from entering WBA competitions. They would not sanction any tournaments that differentiated between men and women, and stated that any players accepting payment from tournament organisers would lose their amateur status. Carpenter resigned from the Association in February 1934, as she was not granted permission to play in the Junior Amateur Championship organised by The Billiard Player magazine. She claimed that the sport would not thrive under the Association's control. In August, Carpenter declared that she was turning professional. Her first professional match was the following month, against Sydney Lee at St Peter's Hall, Bournemouth. Lee conceded a start of 2,500 points to Carpenter, but won the three-day match 4,030–3,955. By January 1935, the WBA had formally associated with the Billiards and Snooker Control Council, and Carpenter accepted an invitation to play in the Women's Professional Billiards Championship.

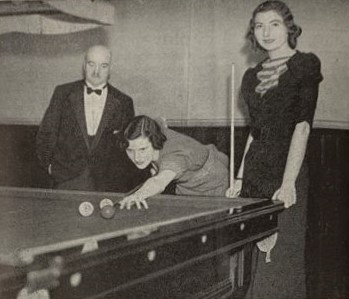
Joyce Gardner (in play) and Carpenter (right) in 1939

From 1936 to 1939 she was runner up to Harrison three times in four years in the Women's Professional Snooker Championship, and once to Joyce Gardner in the Women's Professional Billiards Championship. In 1940, she won her first professional title by beating Ruth Harrison 2,184–1,641 in the Billiards final, and, the next time the event was held, in 1949, beat Gardner 3,120–2,518 to retain the title. 1949 also saw Carpenter lose for the fourth time in the Snooker final, this time 15–16 to Agnes Morris, despite having led for most of the match The 1950 billiards final featured the same finalists as in 1949, and had the same victor, with Carpenter beating Gardner 1978–1374 to win for a third time. A few days later, Carpenter won the Snooker Championship too, this time beating Morris 20–10. Following the cessation of the women's professional snooker and billiards championships after 1950, Carpenter retired from competitive play, as the reigning champion in both events, and later moved to Mudeford. By 1958, her parents had retired from managing their hotel, and Carpenter rarely played cue sports, but had taken up ballroom dancing.

== Non-playing career and personal life ==
Carpenter wrote the "Billiards for Women" column in The Billiard Player magazine and in 1936 she was the first woman to commentate on sports for the BBC when she provided radio commentary for a billiards match between Harrison and Gardner. She was also the first woman to play trick shots on a full-size billiards table as part of exhibition matches.

She married Jimmy Seeor in 1939 and the following year gave birth to a son, who was present for her 1950 Women's Professional Billiards victory. She appeared on BBC Television in 1947, giving a demonstration of billiards alongside Lee. The following year, a match between Carpenter and Harrison was broadcast on BBC Radio. Seeor died in 1989 and Carpenter died in 1998, aged 86.

Writing in 1974, former men's professional snooker champion Horace Lindrum described Carpenter as "A beautiful stylist, [who] did much to foster the women's amateur game." He added that Carpenter's billiards academy for women, which she opened on 1 October 1934, was "certainly the first in England, probably in the world".

== Titles and achievements ==
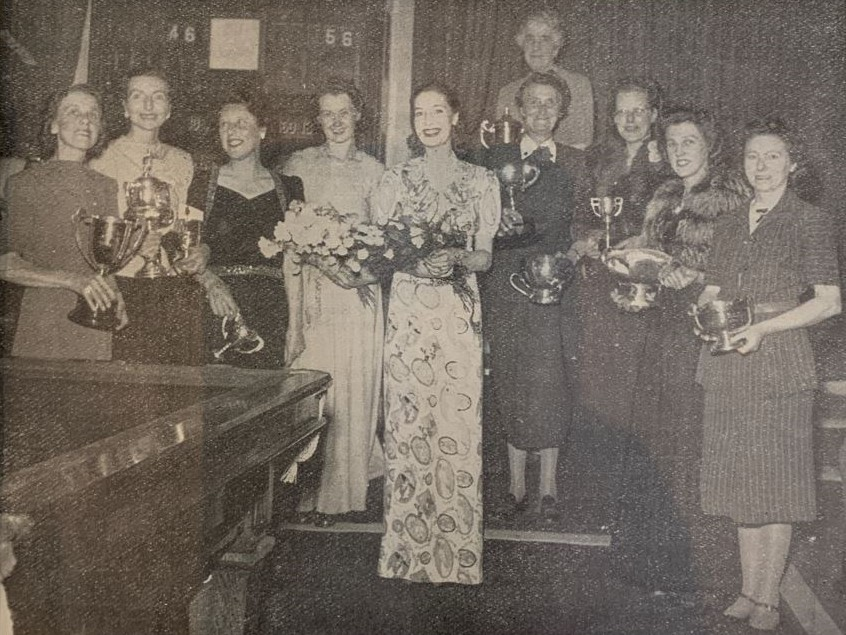
The 1948 Women's Billiards Association awards ceremony. Pictured, (left to right), are Ruth Harrison, Carpenter, Joyce Gardner, Agnes Morris, Valerie Hobson, Evelyn Morland-Smith, Beryl Stamper, Joan Adcock, E. Peters. Back row: Gladys Burton.

Snooker

Outcome	No.	Year	Championship	Opponent	Score	Ref.
Runner-up	1	1936	Women's Professional Snooker Championship	Ruth Harrison	3–7	
Runner-up	2	1938	Women's Professional Snooker Championship	Ruth Harrison	2–11	
Runner-up	3	1939	Women's Professional Snooker Championship	Ruth Harrison	5–8	
Runner-up	4	1949	Women's Professional Snooker Championship	Agnes Davies	15–16	
Winner	5	1950	Women's Professional Snooker Championship	Agnes Davies	20–10	

Billiards

Outcome	No.	Year	Championship	Opponent	Score	Ref.
Winner	1	1932	Women's Amateur Billiards Championship	Ethel Brown	1,000-730	
Winner	2	1933	Women's Amateur Billiards Championship	Vera Seals	1,000-552	
Winner	3	1934	Women's Amateur Billiards Championship	Vera Seals	1,200–915	
Runner-up	4	1938	Women's Professional Billiards Championship	Joyce Gardner	1,824–2,313	
Winner	5	1940	Women's Professional Billiards Championship	Ruth Harrison	2,184–1,641	
Winner	6	1948 (Note: No contest was held between 1940 and 1947)	Women's Professional Billiards Championship	Joyce Gardner	2,659–1,670	
Winner	7	1949	Women's Professional Billiards Championship	Joyce Gardner	3,120–2,528	
Winner	8	1950	Women's Professional Billiards Championship	Joyce Gardner	1,978–1,374	
