= Joyce Gardner =

English world champion billiards player (1910–1981)

- Gardner practicing with the aid of a mirror at Burroughes Hall in 1948
- Born: 24 August 1910; Gloucester, Gloucestershire
- Died: 29 August 1981 (aged 71); Pinner, London
- Sport country: England
- Highest break: 318 (English billiards); 82 (snooker)
- World Women's Billiards Champion: 1931–33, 1935–38

Joyce Gardner (1910–1981) was an English professional English billiards player. She was the Women's Professional Billiards Champion from 1931 to 1933, and from 1935 to 1938.

== Early life ==
Joyce Winifred Frances Gardner was born on 24 August 1910 in Gloucester. While living in Gloucester Joyce's parents ran the Glevum Billiard hall. But Joyce didn't take up billiards until the family moved to London where her father ran a billiards saloon in Holborn. Initially she took up millinery and dressmaking, but she discovered that she had a skill for potting balls whilst helping her father clear up the billiard tables.

== Career ==
Margaret Lennan beat Joyce Gardner 1000–960 at Hull in September 1928 in a match billed as the British Championship. Billiard cloth manufacturers Howard and Powell provided a silver rose bowl for the winner. This match is omitted from records in the handbooks of the Billiards and Snooker Control Council.

In 1930, she started working for cue sports company Burroughes and Watts, and received coaching from JP Mannock, Willie Smith and Sidney Smith.

Burroughes and Watts organised the British Women's Billiards Championship in 1930, a competition also known as the Burwat Billiards Cup. The following year, 1931, the Women's Billiards Association was formed: Gardner was one of the four professional players appointed to a committee to organise the professional championships, the others were Margaret Lennan, Eva Collins and Ruth Harrison. It was agreed that the Association would take over the running of the competition as a world championship, with the same trophy as used in 1930.

Her break of 96 in the 1930 final was the first break by a woman to receive a certificate of recognition from the Billiards Association and Control Council. and she made the first century break in the competition, a 100 in 1934.

Gardner was also runner-up six times, so appeared in a total of 13 finals in the 14 times the event was staged. The only year that she was not in the final was 1940, when she was beaten by Thelma Carpenter in the semi-final.

Gardner's highest break at billiards was 318, and at snooker it was 82.

She was a guest on the introductory episode of the second series of the popular British TV snooker show Pot Black in 1970.

== Later life ==
Gardner married Arthur Williams on 9 October 1937 at St. Marylebone Parish Church in London. She made two film appearances: It Happened in Leicester Square in 1949; and Jumping for Joy in 1956 where she played a billiards player. It was reported that Gardner tutored the latter film's star Frankie Howerd who in the film "has a number of hair-raising interludes in a London billiards saloon".

She continued playing until her late sixties and became the only woman member of the World Professional Billiards and Snooker Association. She died on 29 August 1981 in Pinner, London.

== Titles and achievements ==
Snooker

Outcome	No.	Year	Championship	Opponent	Score	Ref.
Runner-up	1	1934	Women's Professional Snooker Championship	Ruth Harrison	6–7	
Runner-up	2	1935	Women's Professional Snooker Championship	Ruth Harrison	5–7	
Runner-up	3	1937	Women's Professional Snooker Championship	Ruth Harrison	4–9	

Billiards

Outcome	No.	Year	Championship	Opponent	Score	Ref.
Winner	1	1930	Women's Professional Billiards Championship	Eva Collins	1,500–727	
Winner	2	1931	Women's Professional Billiards Championship	Eva Collins	2,000–1,185	
Winner	3	1932	Women's Professional Billiards Championship	Ruth Harrison	2,000–1,713	
Winner	4	1933	Women's Professional Billiards Championship	Ruth Harrison	2,000–1,306	
Runner-up	5	1934	Women's Professional Billiards Championship	Ruth Harrison	1,608–2,000	
Runner-up	6	1935^{Note 1}	Women's Professional Billiards Championship	Ruth Harrison	3,000-2,708	
Winner	7	1935^{Note 1}	Women's Professional Billiards Championship	Margaret Lennan	3,000–2,872	
Winner	8	1937	Women's Professional Billiards Championship	Ruth Harrison	2,223–2,204	
Winner	9	1938	Women's Professional Billiards Championship	Thelma Carpenter	2,313-1,824	
Runner-up	10	1939	Women's Professional Billiards Championship	Ruth Harrison	1,792-2,559	
Runner-up	11	1948	Women's Professional Billiards Championship	Thelma Carpenter	1,670-2,659	
Runner-up	12	1949	Women's Professional Billiards Championship	Thelma Carpenter	2,528-3,120	
Runner-up	13	1950	Women's Professional Billiards Championship	Thelma Carpenter	1,374-1,978	

== Notes ==
^{Note 1} The Championship was played in both February and November 1935, and not in 1936
