= Women's Billiards Association =

Governing body for cue sports Billiards and Snooker

- Sport: Amateur and professional women's snooker and billiards
- Jurisdiction: UK and Ireland
- Abbreviation: WBA
- Founded: 1931
- Headquarters: London, United Kingdom
- Replaced: 1976

The Women's Billiards Association (WBA), founded in 1931 and based in London, United Kingdom, was the governing body for women's English billiards and snooker, and organised the Women's Professional Billiards Championship and Women's Professional Snooker Championship as well as amateur and junior competitions. The founding meeting was held on 13 May 1931 at the Women's Automobile and Sports Association. The meeting was chaired by Teresa Billington-Greig and appointed Viscountess Elibank as the first president and Mrs Longworth as the first chairman. The WBA ran amateur and professional billiards competitions starting from 1932, an amateur snooker tournament from 1933, and a professional snooker championship from 1934.

It affiliated to the Billiards Association and Control Council (BA&CC) in 1935. In 1936, after a proposal by the Association, the BA&CC took over the management of the WBA. The Association continued to stage professional competitions until 1950, and amateur competitions until the 1970s, when the Women's Billiards & Snooker Association, which was formed in 1976, and later the World Ladies Billiards & Snooker Association, founded in 1981, took control of the games.

== Formation ==
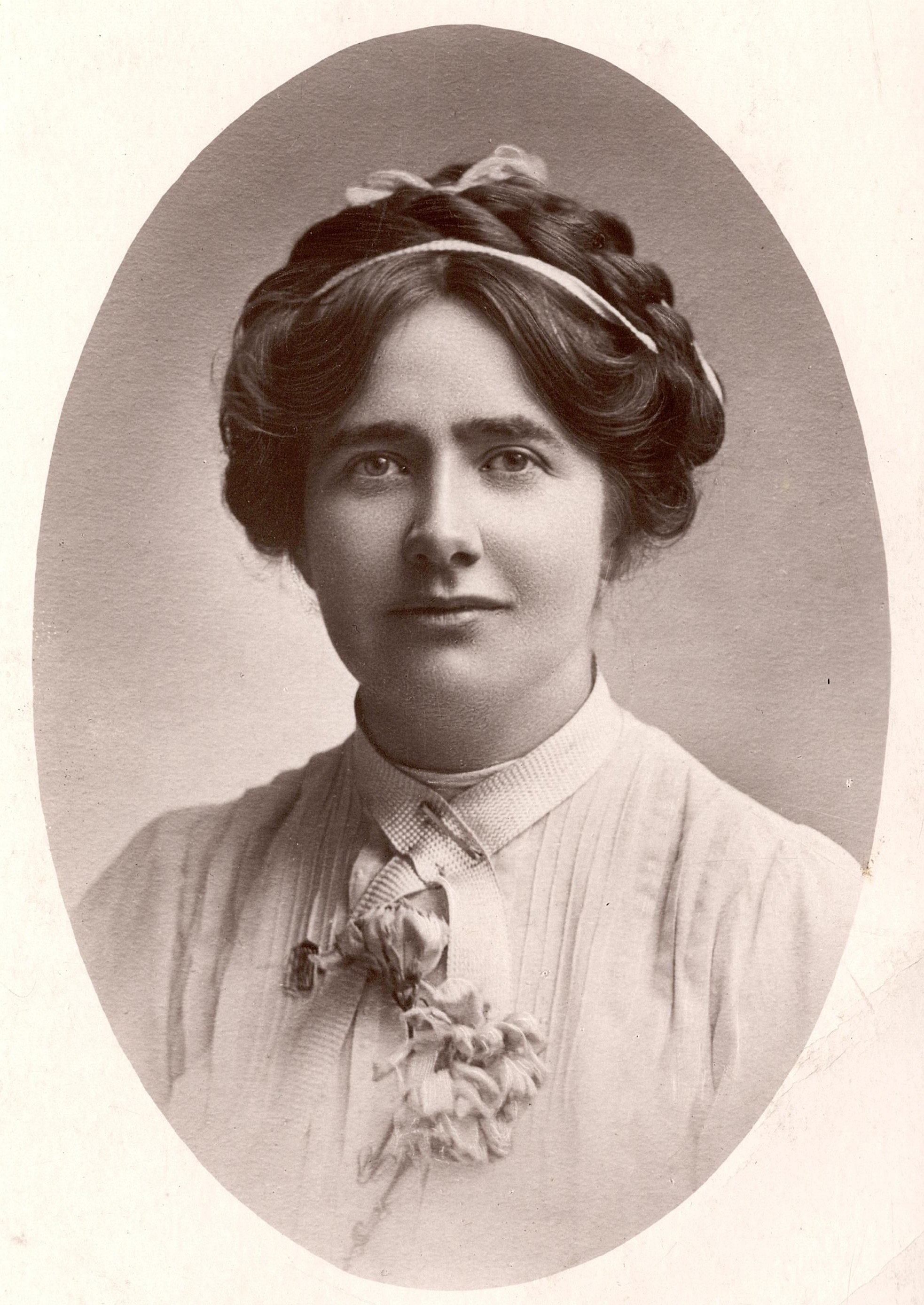
Teresa Billington-Greig (pictured c. 1910), who chaired the founding meeting of the Women's Billiards Association

The Women's Billiards Association (WBA) was founded on 13 May 1931 at the Women's Automobile and Sports Association clubhouse on Buckingham Palace Gardens, London, with the objective of controlling the amateur and professional English billiards and snooker championships for women, and promoting other tournaments and competitions. Viscountess Elibank was appointed president, Mrs Longworth was chairman, and Teresa Billington-Greig, who had chaired this initial meeting, became acting honorary secretary. Miss Marx of the Women's Sports and Automobile Association became honorary treasurer. Other council members appointed included Mrs Eddowes, runner-up in the previous amateur billiards championship, Thelma Carpenter, and Lady Constance Childe-Pemberton. The majority of the council members were subscribers to the Lyceum Club, which had a billiards "circle" (group for activities). Billington-Greig's husband sold billiard tables for Burroughes & Watts Ltd, and she had substituted for him at work during part of World War I and again in 1923.

The jurisdiction of the WBA as the governing body for women's English billiards and snooker covered the United Kingdom and Ireland.

== Activities ==
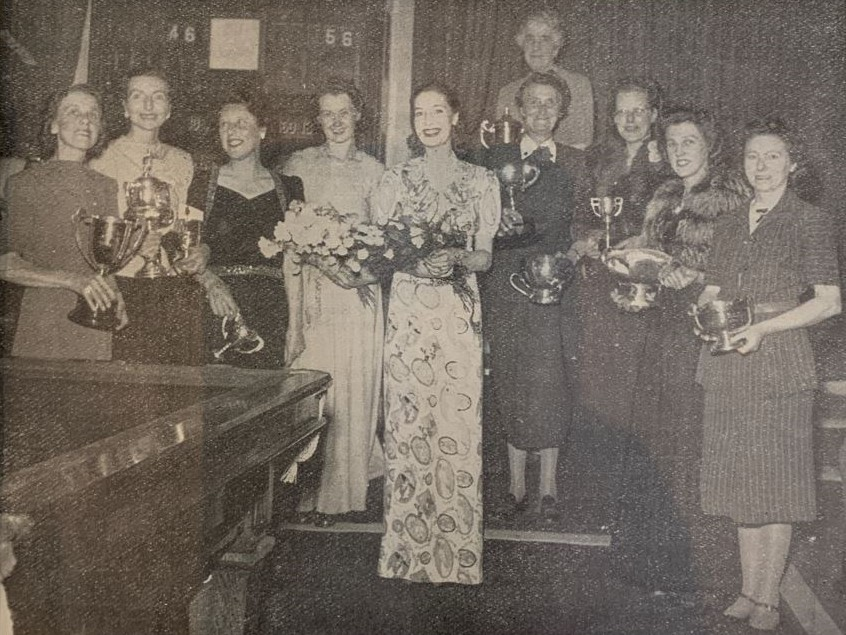
The 1948 Women's Billiards Association awards ceremony. Pictured (left to right), are Ruth Harrison, Thelma Carpenter, Joyce Gardner, Agnes Morris, Valerie Hobson, Evelyn Morland-Smith, Beryl Stamper, Joan Adcock, E. Peters. Back row: Gladys Burton

Control of the professional billiards and snooker tournaments for women, and the trophies for the previous events run by Burroughes & Watts, were handed over to the Association. A subcommittee including four professional players, Joyce Gardner, Ruth Harrison, Margaret Lennan and Eva Collins, was appointed to organise the professional championships. The Association provided Thelma Carpenter with a certificate for having made a break of 59. The Association organised the Amateur and Professional championships in snooker and billiards, girls' championships, inter-club events, and regional competitions.

The WBA took over the organisation of an amateur billiards championship from Burroughes and Watts from 1932, and staged an annual amateur snooker championship from 1933. These continued to be held by the WBA, taking place most years except during World War II, until the 1970s.

In 1930, Burroughes and Watts had organised the British Women's Billiards Championship, also known as the Burwat Billiards Cup. The WBA took over the running of the competition, renamed as the Women's Professional Billiards Championship, with the same trophy, from 1932. Gardner claimed the championship on seven on the fourteen times that it was held, with Harrison taking two titles, and Carpenter winning the last four editions.

The Association encouraged the formation of "Billiards Circles", local groups of players, that would become affiliated. Some of the places where Billiards Circles were established were Birmingham, Sheffield, Manchester, Cardiff, Norwich, Torquay and Bournemouth.

On 14 December 1933, the WBA Council announced that any players entering open events not organised or sanctioned by the WBA would be prohibited from entering WBA competitions, that no permissions would be granted where tournaments differentiated between men and women, and that any players accepting payment would lose their amateur status. The following year, leading player Carpenter resigned from the Association, as she was not granted permission to play in the Junior Amateur Championship organised by The Billiard Player magazine. She claimed that the sport would not thrive under the Association's control.

The WBA held a Women's Professional Snooker Championship tournament ten times from 1934 to 1950, with a break from 1941 to 1947 due to World War II. Harrison won the first eight of the ten championships, followed by Agnes Davies taking the title in 1949 and Carpenter in 1950. The first seven championships were held at Burroughes Hall, with the tournaments from 1947 taking place at Leicester Square Hall.

== Relationship with the Billiards Association and Control Council ==
In 1933 John C. Bissett, Chairman of the Billiards Association and Control Council (BA&CC), the governing body for the men's games, praised the work of the Women's Billiards Association, and said that the BA&CC had "no desire to interfere" in the running of the woman's game. In 1935, the WBA affiliated to the BA&CC. In May 1936, the WBA's executive committee proposed to the membership that the BA&CC should be requested to take control of the organisation's affairs, and on 10 June 1936, the Billiards Association and Control Council agreed to take over management of the WBA. Lord Lonsdale, president of the BA&CC, also became president of the WBA.

Bisset, chairman of the BA&CC, was elected chairman of the WBA in 1939, with Miss G. M. Burton as the new vice-chairman. Bisset resigned as chairman in 1948, noted at the WBA Annual General Meeting held on 13 December that year, which started twenty minutes late due to the late arrival of the Honorary Secretary, Joy White. The meeting re-elected the absent film star Valerie Hobson as president, but did not attract enough candidates to fill all the vacancies on its council.

The 1950 Women's Professional Billiards Championship and Women's Professional Snooker Championship were the last professional championships to be organised by the WBA. As at 1971, the WBA's headquarters was at the Billiards and Snooker Centre in Great Windmill Street.

== Successor organisations ==
Burroughes and Watts continued to provide support to women's cue sports until the firm's takeover by the Riley company in 1967, following which the amateur competitions suffered from a lack of sponsorship and organisation. The Women's Billiards & Snooker Association (WBSA) was formed in 1976, and appointed Wally West as Secretary 1978. However, although the WBSA revived the world snooker championship, within a few years it had lost control of the game to the World Ladies Billiards & Snooker Association (WLBSA), founded in 1981 by Mandy Fisher.

The Women's Professional Billiards Championship has not been held since 1950. The Women's Amateur Billiards Championship was not held between 1979 and its revival by the WLBSA in 1998.

The WLBSA was restructured as a subsidiary of the World Professional Billiards and Snooker Association in 2015, and became a full member of the World Snooker Federation in 2017. In November 2018 the WLBSA was renamed, as World Women's Snooker, and is responsible for women's snooker and billiards and the women's ranking list.
