= Matthew Hilton (historian) =

Matthew J. Hilton, FRHistS, is an academic social historian. Since 2016, he has been Vice-Principal for Humanities and Social Sciences at Queen Mary University of London, where he holds a professorship.

== Career ==
Hilton completed his doctorate of philosophy (PhD) at Lancaster University in 1996 for a thesis entitled Constructing tobacco: perspectives on consumer culture in Britain, 1850–1950. He joined the University of Birmingham as a lecturer in 1997, and was appointed Professor of Social History there in 2006; by 2016, he was deputy head of the university's School of the Arts and Law. He moved to Queen Mary University of London in 2016 as professor in the school of history and Vice-Principal for Humanities and Social Sciences. As of 2017, he is a member of the editorial board of Past & Present, and a Fellow of the Royal Historical Society. In 2002, he won the Philip Leverhulme Prize for Modern History.

== Research ==
Hilton's research focuses on humanitarianism, consumerism and social activism, often with a focus on Britain, but also with global and comparative dimensions. His published works include:

=== Books ===
- Smoking in British Popular Culture, 1800–2000 (Manchester: Manchester University Press, 2000).
- (with Martin Daunton) The Politics of Consumption: Material Culture and Citizenship in Europe and America (Oxford: Berg, 2001).
- Consumerism in Twentieth-Century Britain: The Search for a Historical Movement (Cambridge University Press, 2003).
- (with Marie-Emmanuelle Chessel and Alain Chatriot) The Expert Consumer: Associations and Professionals in Consumer Society (Aldershot: Ashgate, 2006).
- (with James McKay and Nicholas Crowson) NGOs in Contemporary Britain: Non-state Actors in Society and Politics since 1945 (London: Palgrave, 2009).
- Choice and Justice: Forty Years of the Malaysian Consumer Movement (Penang: Universiti Sains Malaysia Press, 2009).
- Prosperity for All: Consumer Activism in an Era of Globalisation (Ithaca, NY: Cornell University Press, 2009).
- (with James McKay) The Ages of Voluntarism: Evolution and Change in Modern British Voluntary Action (Oxford: British Academy/Oxford University Press, 2011).
- (with Nicholas Crowson, Jean-François Mouhot and James McKay), A Historical Guide to NGOs in Britain: Charities, Civil Society and the Voluntary Sector since 1945 (Basingstoke: Palgrave 2012).
- (with James McKay, Nicholas Crowson and Jean-François Mouhot) The Politics of Expertise: How NGOs Shaped Modern Britain (Oxford University Press, 2013).
- (with Kieran Connell) Cultural Studies 50 Years On (London: Rowman and Littlefield, 2016).

=== Journals ===
- "'Tabs', 'Fags' and the 'Boy Labour Problem' in Late Victorian and Edwardian England", Journal of Social History, vol. 28, issue 3 (1995), pp. 587–608.
- "The female consumer and the politics of consumption in twentieth-century Britain", Historical Journal, vol. 45, issue 1 (2002), pp. 103–128.
- "The fable of the sheep; or private virtues, public vices: the consumer revolution of the twentieth century", Past & Present, vol. 176 (2002), pp. 222–256.
- "The legacy of luxury: moralities of consumption since the eighteenth century", Journal of Consumer Culture, vol. 4, issue 1 (2004), pp. 101–123.
- (with Malgorzata Mazurek) "Consumerism, Solidarity and communism: consumer protection and the consumer movement in Poland", Journal of Contemporary History, vol. 42, issue 2 (2007), pp. 315–343.
- "Social activism in an age of consumption: the organised consumer movement", Social History, vol. 32, issue 2 (2007), pp. 121–143.
- "The consumer movement and civil society in Malaysia", International Review of Social History, vol. 52, issue 3 (2007), pp. 373–406.
- "The death of consumer society", Transactions of the Royal Historical Society, vol. 18 (2008), pp. 211–236.
- "Politics is ordinary: non-governmental organisations and political participation in contemporary Britain", Twentieth-Century British History, vol. 22 (2011), pp. 230–268.
- "Ken Loach and the Save the Children Film: humanitarianism, imperialism and the changing role of charity in postwar Britain", Journal of Modern History, vol. 87, issue 2 (2015), pp. 357–394
- "The working practices of Birmingham’s Centre for Contemporary Cultural Studies", Social History, vol. 40, issue 3 (2015), pp. 287–311.
- "Charity, decolonisation and development: the case of the Starehe Boys School, Nairobi", Past & Present (2016).
