= Eva Collins =

Female snooker and billiards player

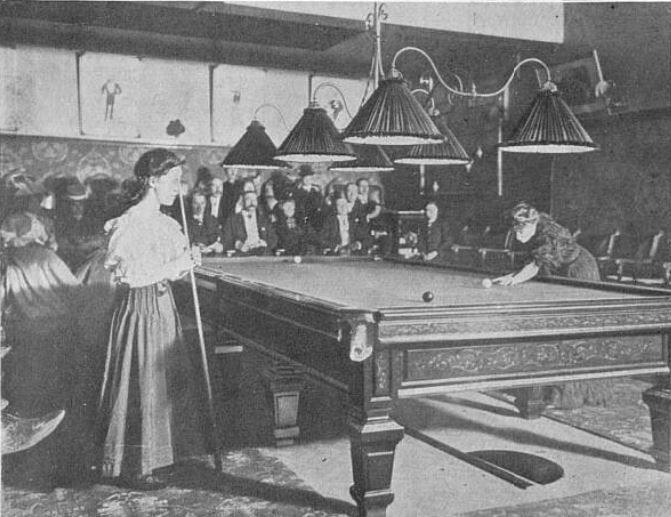
- Collins (left) versus Madame Strebor

Personal information
- Born: 29 July 1887 Camberwell, London, England
- Died: c. October 1972 Croydon, London, England

Sport
- Country: England
- Sport: Snooker

Eva Elsie Collins Parsons (29 Jul 1887–c. Oct 1972) was an English snooker and billiards player. She was runner-up in the 1930 British Women's Billiards Championship and in its successor tournament, the Women's Professional Billiards Championship in 1931.

== Early life and billiards career ==
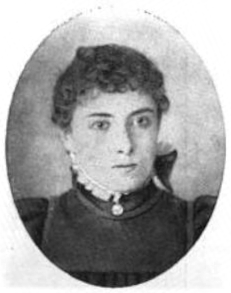
Ella Collins

Eva Collins was born in London, England, on 29 July 1887. She was the daughter of Sarah Grace Haydon and professional billiards player George Alfred Collins, who was the all-England billiards champion in 1877 and 1888. Her sister, Ella Collins, was also a pioneering women's billiards player.

She started learning to play in July 1902, and a few months later, at the age of 12, she was the subject of an article in the Portsmouth Evening News for beating a boy of 16 in a billiards match.

In 1906, Collins played two series of billiards exhibition matches against "Madame Strebor," a pseudonym used by an unknown woman player who had toured with John Roberts Jr. The series held at Burroughes Hall finished 7–5 in favor of Madame Strebor. Shortly afterward, Collins won 15 of 24 matches against Strebor in Manchester.

She married insurance salesman Charles Parsons on

Collins became a billiards instructor at the Lyceum Ladies Club. As of January 1936, she had been coaching for over 24 years. She used her father's cue in competition.

Her death was recorded in the final quarter of 1972, at the age of 85.

== Women's Billiards Association and Women's Professional Billiards Championship ==
In 1930, Collins was the losing finalist in the British Women's Billiards Championship organized by the cue sports company Burrouhges and Watts.

When the Women's Billiards Association was formed in 1931, Collins was one of four professional players appointed to a committee to organise the professional championships, along with Joyce Gardner, Ruth Harrison, and Margaret Lennan.

From 1931, the Women's Billiards Association organised the world championship, with the same trophy used in the 1930 British Women's Billiards Championship, and Collins was again a losing finalist in the first competition under the Association's control, in 1931.

Collins played in the Women's Professional Billiards Championship each year from 1930 to 1937, but did not play in 1938, possibly due to her other commitments as a coach and referee.

She also competed in the Women's Professional Snooker Championship, but never reached the final of that tournament.

== Refereeing ==
She was the first woman to qualify as a billiards and snooker referee, at a time when only around 200 men held the same qualification. At the Boy's Billiards Championship in 1932, became the first woman to referee a championship match.

== Titles and achievements ==
Snooker

Outcome	No.	Year	Championship	Opponent	Score	Ref.
Semi-finalist	1	1934	Women's Professional Snooker Championship	Ruth Harrison	2–7	
Semi-finalist	2	1936	Women's Professional Snooker Championship	Ruth Harrison	1–5	

Billiards

Outcome	No.	Year	Championship	Opponent	Score	Ref.
Runner-up	1	1930	Women's Professional Billiards Championship	Joyce Gardner	727–1,500	
Runner-up	2	1931	Women's Professional Billiards Championship	Joyce Gardner	1,185–2,000	
