= Teresa Billington-Greig =

British suffragette (1876–1964)

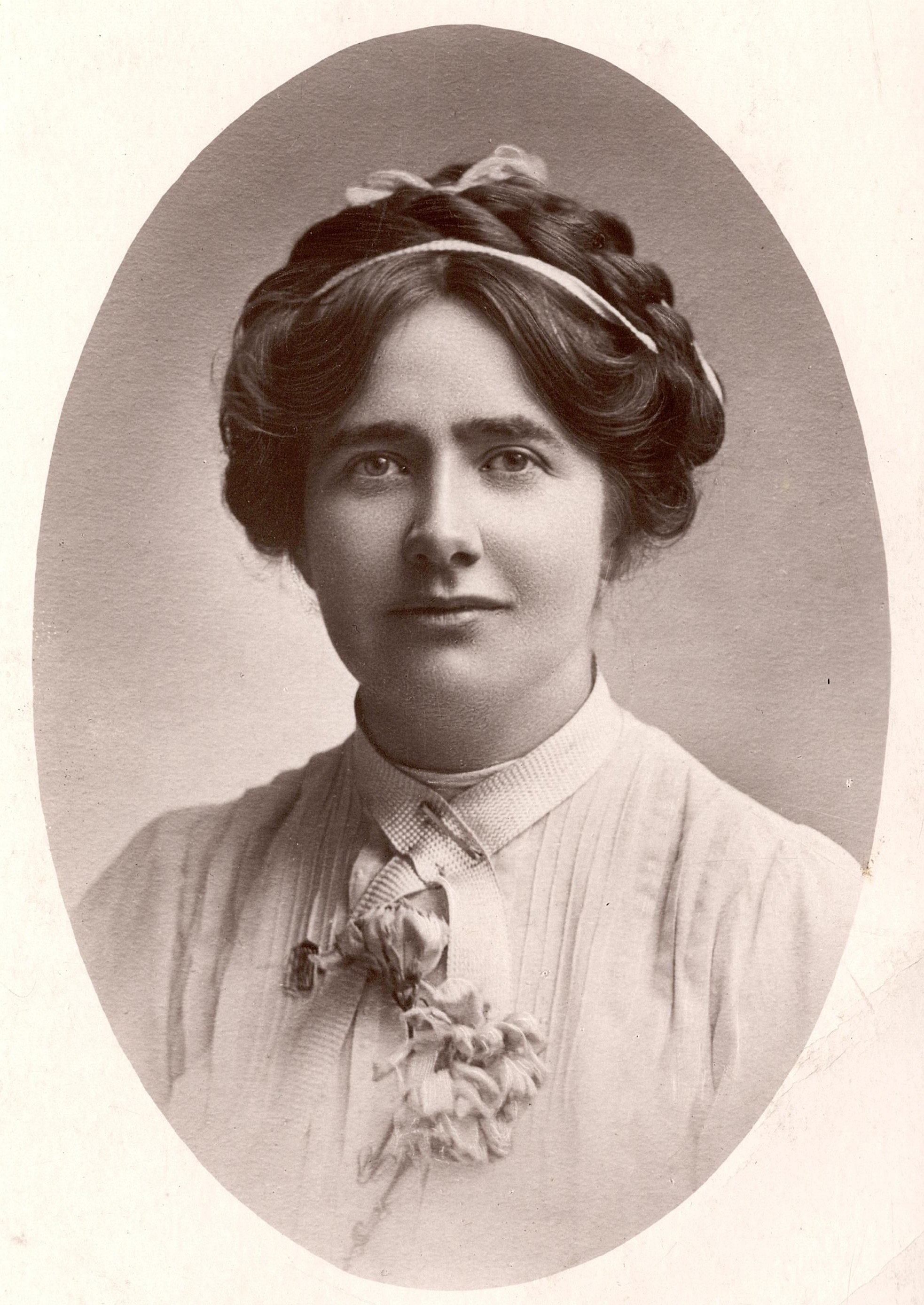
- Born: Teresa Mary Billington; 15 October 1876; Preston, Lancashire, United Kingdom of Great Britain and Ireland
- Died: 21 October 1964 (aged 88); London, United Kingdom
- Other name: TBG
- Education: Manchester University
- Occupations: Writer, suffragist
- Organization(s): Women's Social and Political Union; Women's Freedom League; Women's Billiards Association
- Notable work: The Militant Suffrage Movement; The Consumer in Revolt
- Political party: Independent Labour Party
- Spouse: Frederick Lewis Greig (m. 1907)
- Children: Fiona Billington Greig (1915 - 1996)

Teresa Billington-Greig (15 October 1876 – 21 October 1964) was a British writer and suffragette who was one of the founders of the Women's Freedom League in 1907. She had left the Women's Social and Political Union (WSPU) as she considered the leadership led by Emmeline Pankhurst and her daughters too autocratic. In 1904, she was appointed by the WSPU as a travelling speaker for the organisation. In Autumn 1906, Billington-Greig was tasked with drumming up support for branches of WSPU in Scotland. On 25 April 1906, she unveiled a "Votes for Women" banner from the Ladies Gallery during the debate in the House of Commons. In June 1906, she was arrested in a fracas outside of Chancellor of the Exchequer H. H. Asquith's home, and as a result was the first suffragette to be incarcerated in Holloway Prison.

She founded the Women's Billiards Association in 1931. Her publications include The Militant Suffrage Movement (1911), which contained criticism of suffragettes' tactics, and The Consumer in Revolt (1912), which explored links between consumerism and feminism. Her archives are held at the Women's Library at the London School of Economics.

== Early life ==
Teresa Mary Billington was born in Preston, Lancashire, on 15 October 1876. (Note: Billington-Greig believed that she was born in 1877, and that date appears in other sources. See note on p. 295 of McPhee, FitzGerald and Billington-Greig (1987).) Her mother, Helen Wilson, ran a small shop, with two other partners, that was subsidised by her own father, who managed Preston's first department store. At her own father's behest, Wilson married William Billington, who became involved with the running of the shop. After the business failed, the family moved to Blackburn where William Billington joined a boiler-making company. Teresa and her elder sister attended the Convent of Notre Dame School, where the education was limited. She was a keen reader and writer of poetry and essays, selling stories to a Roman Catholic magazine.

After leaving school at 13, Billington was apprenticed in the millinery trade. However, she realised that at home she would not have the opportunity to study, owing to the expectations upon her to contribute to the work of the household, and at 17 she ran away. She approached her grandfather for a job at his department store, which he refused, and it was agreed in the family that she would stay with her uncle, George Wilson, and his family in Manchester. She took night classes there, and qualified to become a teacher.

She taught at a Roman Catholic school in Manchester, studying at the University of Manchester (Ancoats) Settlement in her spare time. Billington's parents were Roman Catholic, however she became an agnostic whilst a teenager. Billington joined the Municipal Education School service where her objection to teaching about the Bible led her to consider a formal protest.

In 1903, she encountered Emmeline Pankhurst through the Education Committee. Pankhurst persuaded Billington to avoid protesting, because it could interfere with her completing her degree, and found her a position in Jewish school. In the same year, Billington joined the Independent Labour Party and became an organiser for them. In April 1904, she founded the Manchester branch of the Equal Pay League of the National Union of Teachers and became honorary secretary.

== Women's Social and Political Union (WSPU) ==
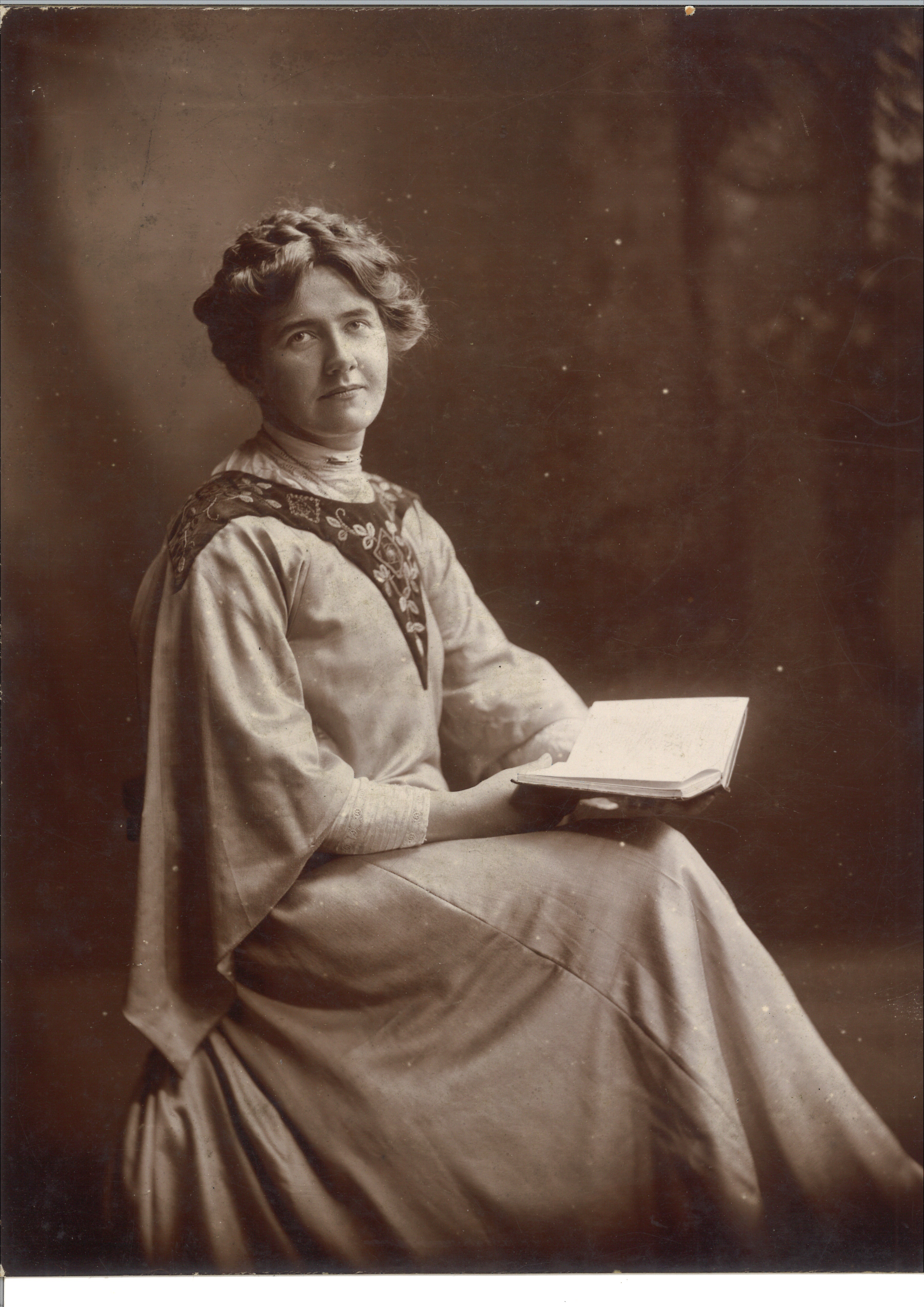
Billington-Greig c. 1906

Billington was appointed by the Women's Social and Political Union (WSPU) as a travelling speaker in 1904. She went to London as a speaker, together with Annie Kenney, whom she had inspired with her "sledgehammer of logic and cold reason". Together they worked on increasing support for the movement. In 1905, Keir Hardie asked her to become the second full-time organiser for the WSPU's activities with the Labour Party.

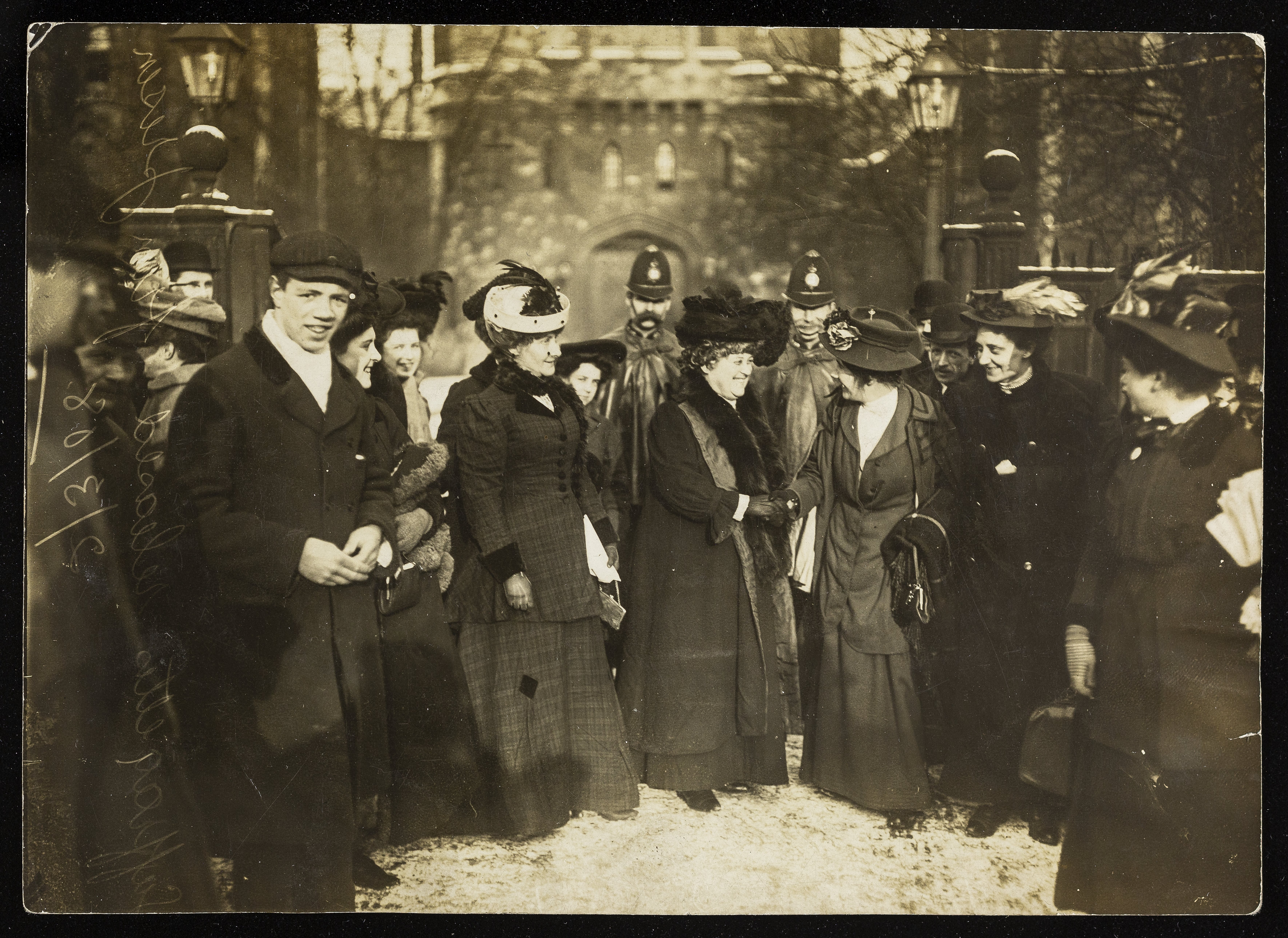
Billington-Greig greeting Helen Bourchier on her release form Holloway Prison. Other suffragettes pictured include Alison Neilans

Billington organised publicity and took part in demonstrations. One of the first was at the Royal Albert Hall on 21 December 1905 which she attended alongside Annie Kenney & Minnie Baldock. While Annie hung a "Votes for Women" over their private box, and called out the words "Will the Liberal Government give women the vote?", Billington unfurled a nine-foot-long banner reading ‘Will the liberal Government give justice to working women?’. They were thrown out of the hall. On 25 April 1906, she once again teamed up with Annie Kenney, unveiling a "Votes for Women" banner from the Ladies Gallery of the House of Commons during a debate on women’s enfranchisement, which had been introduced by Labour politician Keir Hardie. The response was a chorus of jeers and shouts. The women were dragged from the building and forbidden from entering the gallery for the rest of the parliamentary session. A Daily Mirror article the next day reported "striking proofs of the vigour of the leaders of the movement," describing Sylvia Pankhurst painting banners, and discussing the reasons for their activism.

On 21 June 1906, Billington was arrested in a fracas outside of the Chancellor of the Exchequer H. H. Asquith's home and accused of striking and kicking a police officer who arrested her. Billington claimed that the police officer had grabbed her aggressively, causing her bruises, and an inflammation to her throat. This was backed up by the testimony of a witness. She refused to recognise the authority of the magistrates' court as women had played no part in defining the laws that it operated by. She was sentenced to a fine of £10 or two months in prison, and refused to pay the fine or have it paid for her. She became the first suffragette to be incarcerated in Holloway Prison. However, against her wishes, she was released within days after her fine was paid by an anonymous reader of the Daily Mirror. The Daily Mirror interviewed her, where she explained she had been engaged for several years, but "refuses to be led to the altar until her war cry of “Votes for Women” passes into law."

Later in June 1906, Billington helped the WSPU in their canvassing against the Liberal Party candidate in the 1906 Huddersfield by-election with Emmeline Pankhurst and Annie Kenney, impressing local activist Hannah Mitchell. She then travelled to Scotland, in order to organise the WSPU's activism there. It was here that her oratory impressed and influenced Helen Fraser and Janie Allan.

The speaker to who brought me to the militant movement was Theresa Billington Greig. I can see her still, with the heavy plaits round her head, making it look like one carved in Ancient Greece, expounding logically, factually, forcefully and with telling illustrations of the need for women to vote. She persuaded me to take the chair at her next open air meeting to the surprise, and amusement, of our suburbanites. Helen Fraser

She met Frederick Lewis Greig (1875/76–1961) in Scotland, and married him on 8 February 1907, in Glasgow. They agreed to adopt a common surname of Billington-Greig and to be equals in the marriage. The wedding reception took place in the WSPU office in Glasgow.

In an article written the same year, she wrote about how women were excluded from well-paid and influential jobs, and the impact this had on her own career aspirations:

When I was quite young I desired to be an engineer. I was almost as happy among the wonders of machinery as among flowers. The theories of impact, of momentum, of tension - the arrangements of levers, pulleys, planes and screws to make machines, were things to conjure with, with me. But as I was a woman such mechanical talent as I possessed had to be wasted. No department of engineering, theoretical or practical, was open to me. As the desire of women to practise as doctors was opposed, as the would-be women lawyer today is thwarted, so is the would-be women engineer, surveyor, or architect, so is the woman who desires to enter any of the better organised departments of industry.

In 1907, she became unhappy that her suggestions for the direction of the WSPU were being dismissed, and disputes with the Pankhursts precipitated her parting ways with the organisation.

== Founding of the Women's Freedom League (WFL) ==
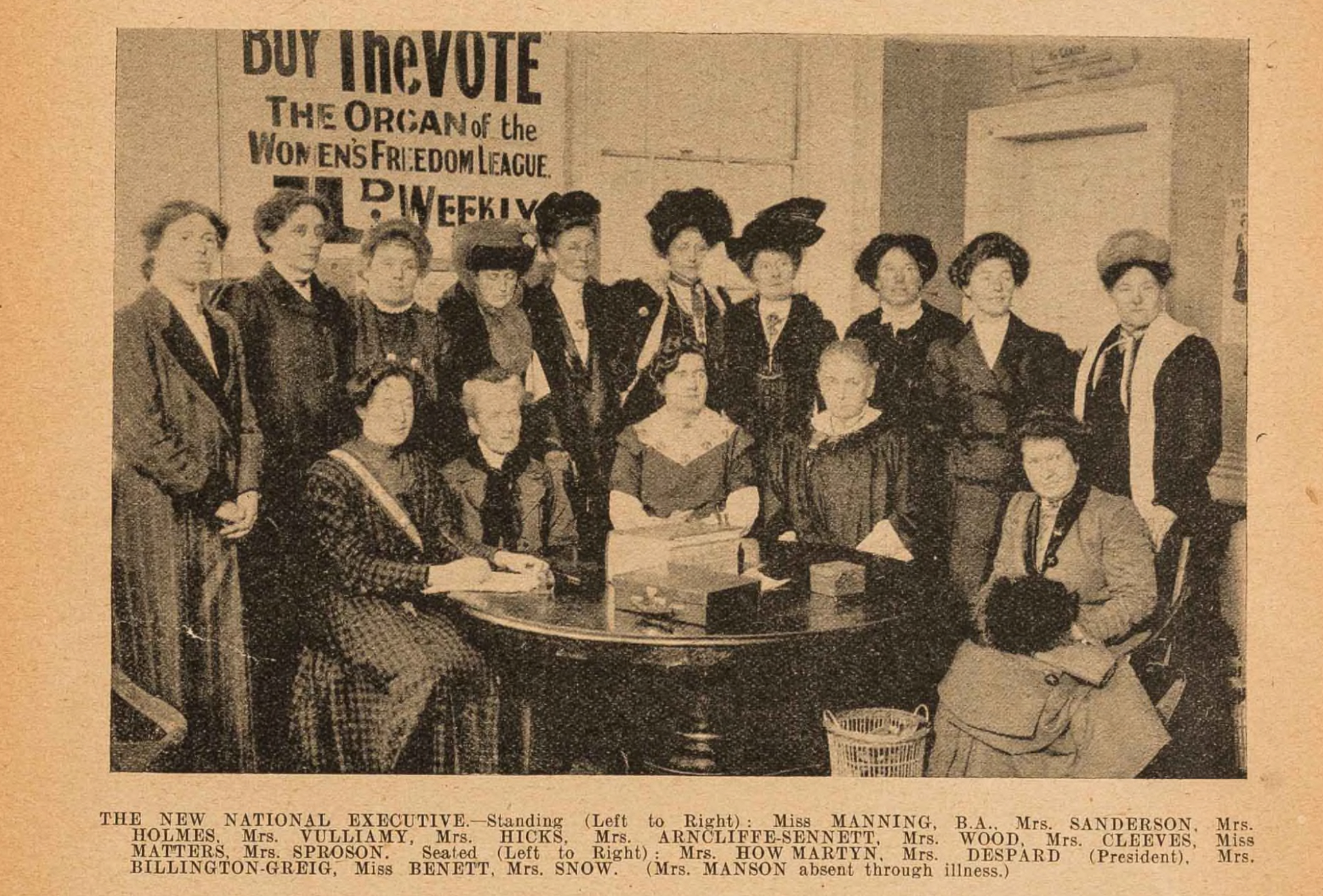
The Vote 12th February. Executive Committee of Women’s Freedom League

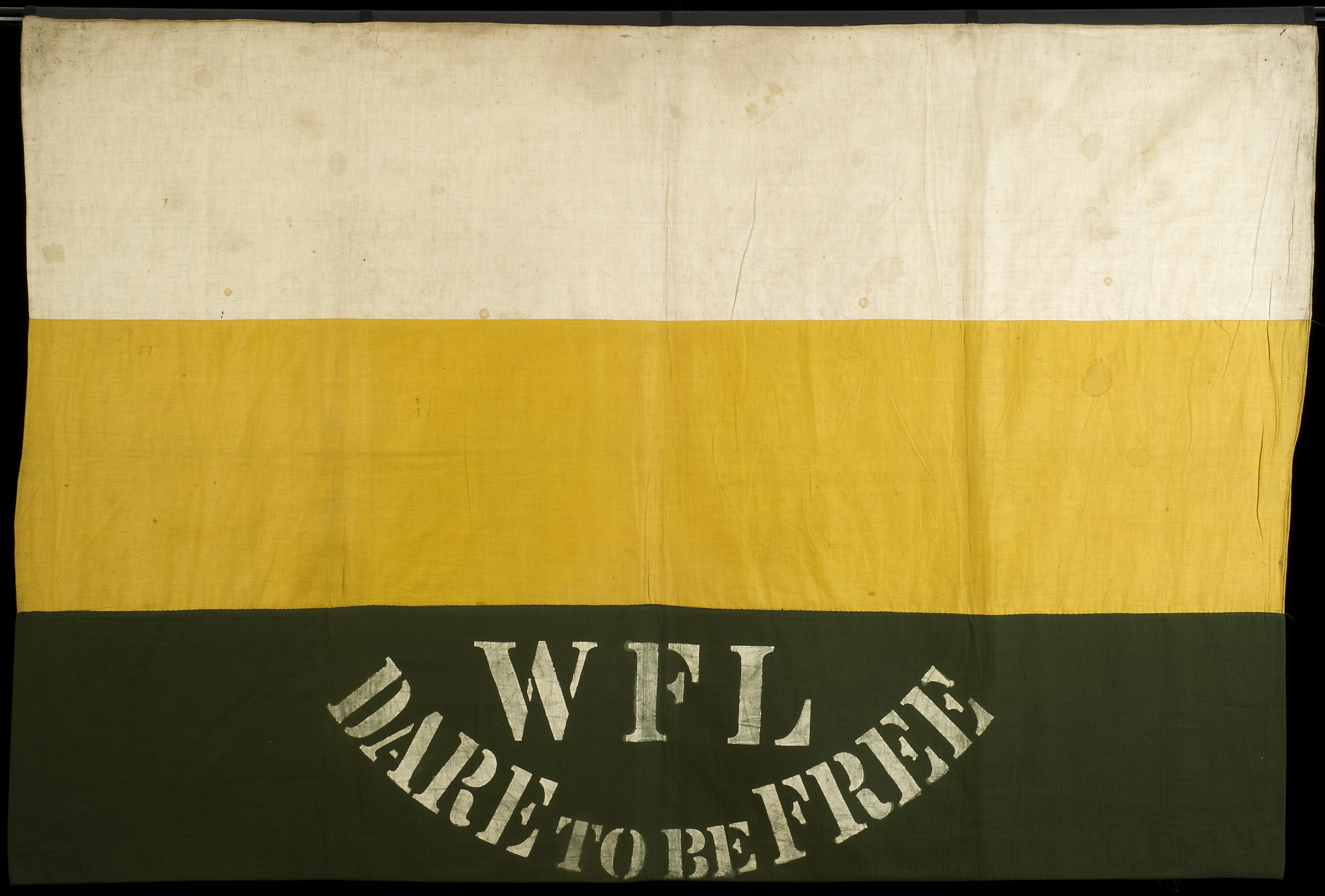
Women's Freedom League colours and motto, 1908

In September 1907, Emmeline Pankhurst suspended the WSPU constitution and took direct control of the Union alongside her daughter Christabel Pankhurst. On 14 September, Billington-Greig, Edith How-Martyn, Charlotte Despard, Alice Abadam, Marion Coates-Hansen, Irene Miller, Bessie Drysdale, and Maude Fitzherbert signed an open letter to Emmeline Pankhurst, explaining their disquiet with the way the organisation was run. The group had suggested that WSPU policy should be decided by delegates at a conference, and that the membership should elect the executive committee.

The dissenters, and a significant number of other members, left the WSPU went on to form the Women's Freedom League (WFL). The new organisation chose the motto "Dare to be Free" and used white, gold and green as their colours.

Billington-Greig resigned from the WFL in December 1910 as she felt that the membership was overly influenced by militant tactics, such as "raids" on Parliament organised by the Pankhursts. Billington-Greig believed the Pankhursts were focused on suffrage at the expense of securing wider freedoms for women. Billington-Greig's surviving writings from 1906 to 1907 demonstrate her views being refined, with her theory coming to encompass a demand for full equality between the sexes, and a rejection of poor tactics to achieve positive outcomes.

== Later career ==
For the next three years after leaving the WFL, Billington-Greig worked as a freelance journalist and speaker, and was not engaged with direct activism. Her work was widely read and discussed in the United States. She compiled suffragette biographies as well as writing on the movement's general history. She wrote articles critical of the policies of the suffrage movement, including "Feminism and Politics," published in the Contemporary Review in 1911, in which she wrote, "there is no feminist organization and no feminist programme. And though the first is not essential, the second is."

Her book The Militant Suffrage Movement was published in 1911. Historian Brian Harrison has described The Militant Suffrage Movement as "the most penetrating contemporary comment on the suffragettes", noting that it is an unusual combination of participant observation and analysis. She made similar criticisms in an article in The Fortnightly Review, "Militant Methods: An Alternate Policy," (1913) claiming that "[t]he militant movement has kept to a straight, narrow way, and, lest it should touch life, it has cloaked itself with artifice and hypocrisy." In place of the militant methods then common, such as attacks on property, she recommended that suffragists try new tactics: "On one matter [a] protest could be made within the Police Court, on another outside, in public meetings, and in the public Press ... Strikes and boycotts could be employed on new feminist lines."

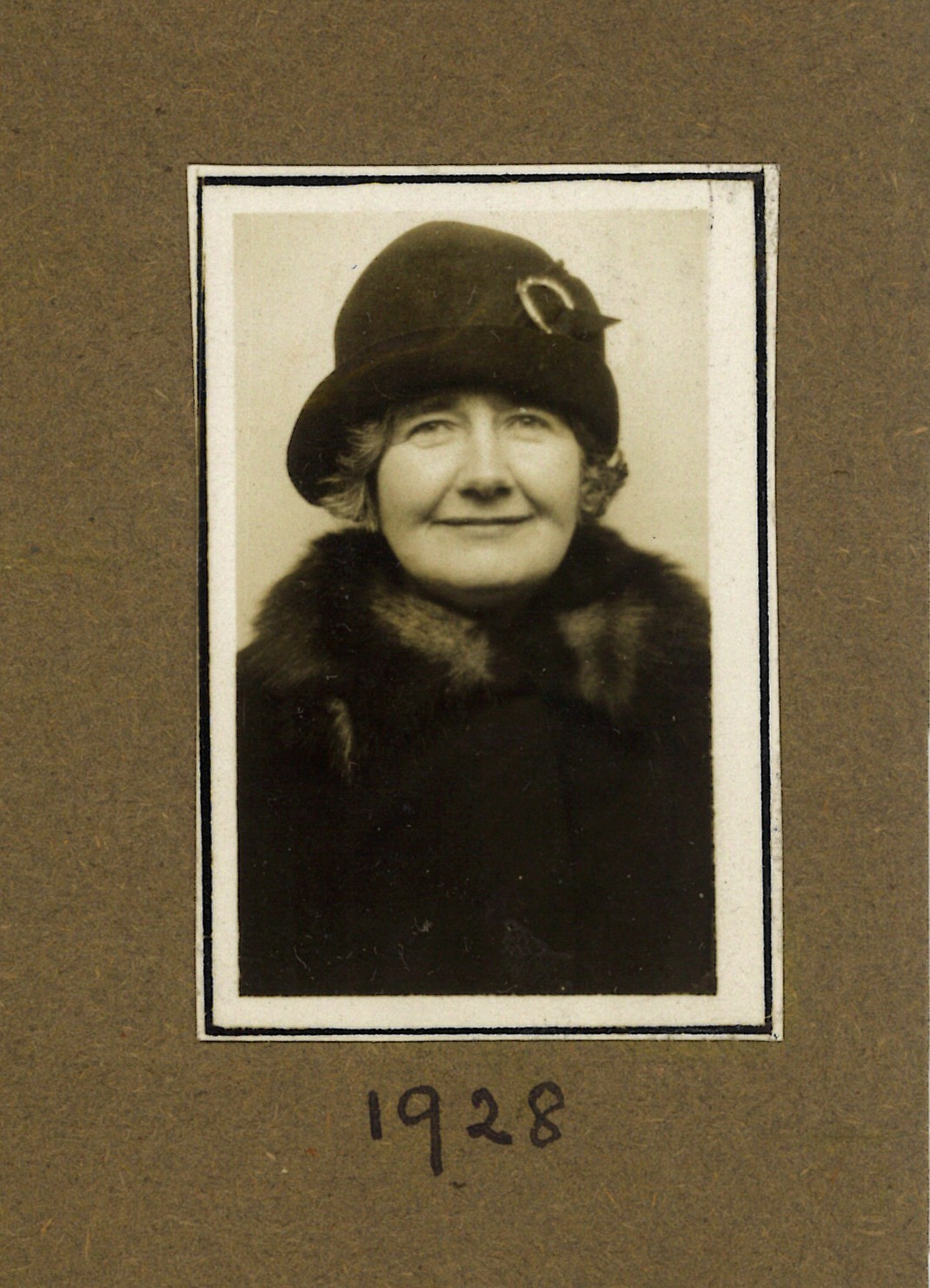
Billington-Greig in 1928

Her short book The Consumer in Revolt (1912) explored links between consumerism and feminism. According to historian Matthew Hilton, "Billington-Greig aimed to add consumption to the arenas around which women could organise". In "The Truth about the White Slave Traffic", published in 1913 in The English Review, Billington-Greig debunked a number of stories about the "white slave trade" that had been propgated in support of the Criminal Law Amendment Act 1912, and found that the actual number of cases of procurement in the UK was very low.

Her daughter Fiona was born in December 1915. During World War I, Billington-Grieg was involved in fundraising for ambulances - for example, supporting Elsie Cameron Corbett at a concert in 1914 to raise funds for the "Scottish Lassie" Motor Organisation Fund which supported the Scottish Women's Hospitals for Foreign Service, and organising a number of events for the British Sportsmen's Ambulance Fund in 1916.

She re-joined the Woman's Freedom League in 1937, and continued to be involved when after World War II it became known as Women for Westminster. She was also a member of the Six Point Group, and was meanwhile working on a history of the suffrage movement.

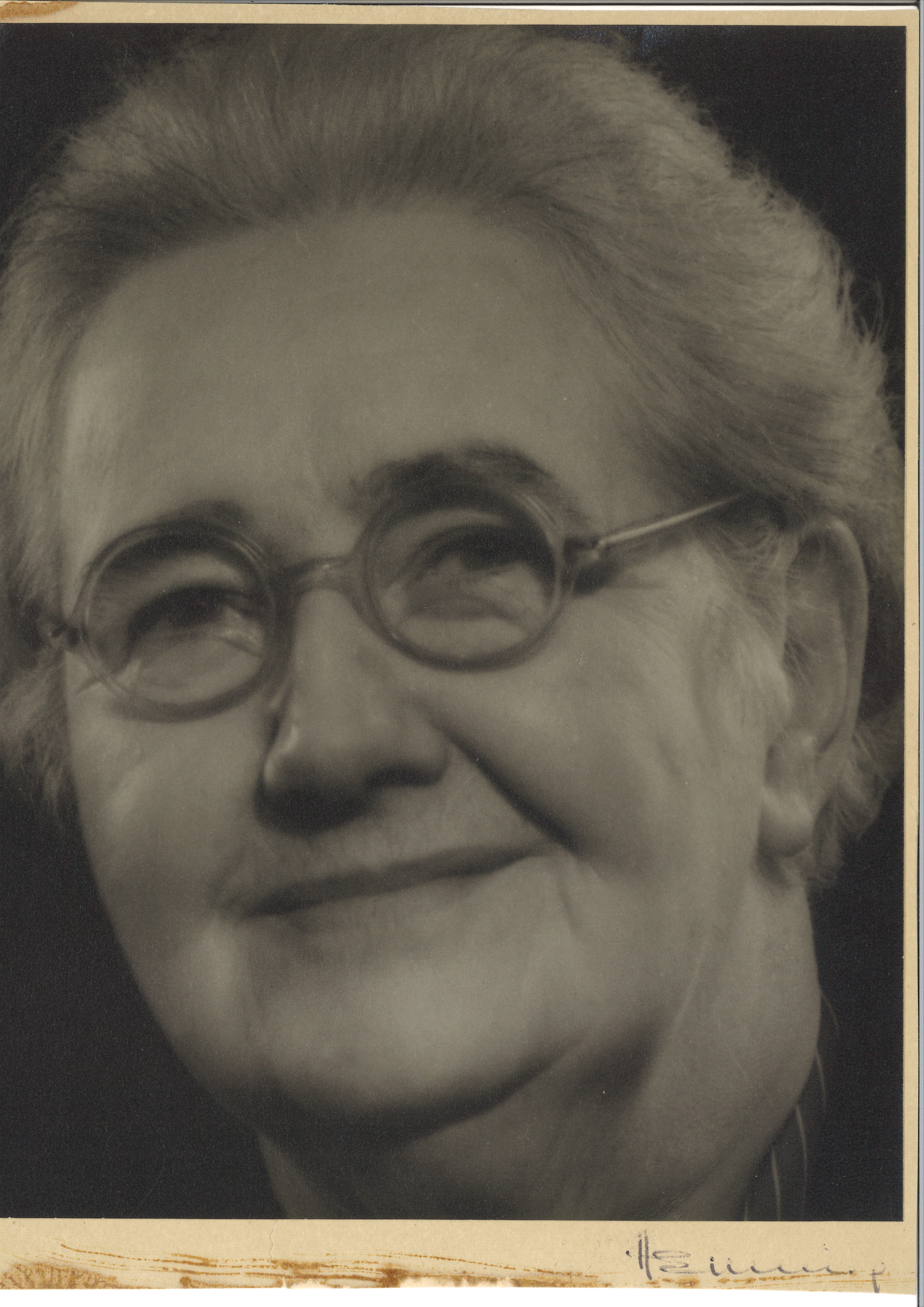
Billington-Greig, c. 1950

In 1915, and again in 1923, Billington-Greig substituted for her husband at the billiard company where he was a manager, and in 1936 she worked briefly as an organiser for the Business and Professional Women's Club. In 1931, she chaired the founding meeting of the Women's Billiards Association, and became the first vice-chairman, and acting honorary secretary, of the organisation.

She died of cancer on 21 October 1964 in London. Her archives are held at the Women's Library (previously known as the Fawcett Library) at the Library of the London School of Economics. Papers were donated to Fawcett Library following her death, and these were complemented by further documents from her daughter Fiona Billington-Greig in 1997. The collection also contains 3 oral history interviews about Billington-Greig, two with her daughter Fiona, recorded in August 1974 and September 1984, and one with her niece, Mrs Beatrice Blackman, recorded in September 1974. The interviews are part of Brian Harrison's Suffrage Interviews project, titled Oral evidence on the suffragette and suffragist movements: the Brian Harrison interviews.

Teresa Billington Greig regularly signed, referred to herself, and was referred to using the abbreviation, T.B.G.

== Posthumous recognition ==
Harrison wrote that Billington-Greig "achieved rather little in relation to [her] talents", and, like Carol McPhee and Ann Fitzgerald, suggests that her lack of ability to compromise and co-operate may have limited her ability to effect change. Billington-Greig herself felt that she had failed in her work, but D. Thom writes in the Oxford Dictionary of National Biography that:

"She had retained her feminist principles throughout. While believing that the unity of all women through their womanly activities, above all as consumers, was the way forward, she never ceased to believe in the power of women through independent organization to make cultural change ... Despite her own sense of frustration and failure, she has inspired substantial critical commentary."

Highlighting some of Billington-Greig's later political involvements, June Hannam and Myriam Boussahba-Bravard call her achievements "impressive", noting that she worked to get women selected as political candidates as well as being involved in groups for women electricians, the Women's Billiards Association, and being the main earner for her family in the 1930s after her husband lost his job. Billington-Greig herself was disappointed with the scale of her accomplishments. In the introduction to The Non-Violent Militant: Selected Writings of Teresa Billington-Greig (1987) McPhee and Fitzgerald wrote of how Billington-Greig "lived to see her work forgotten, the organizations she had founded abandoned, a new generation indifferent, and the feminist revolution that she had devoted her life to still in the future", and express their hope that the book will "deny her claim to personal failure". Prior to that book, there had been scant coverage of both Billington-Greig's life and works.

Her name and picture, with those of 58 other women's suffrage supporters, are on the plinth of the statue of Millicent Fawcett in Parliament Square, London, unveiled in 2018.

== See also ==
- List of suffragists and suffragettes
