= Ruth Harrison (snooker player) =

English snooker and billiards player (1909–1991)

Personal information
- Born: 10 May 1909 Lintz
- Died: 1991 (aged 82)

Sport
- Country: England
- Sport: Snooker

Tournament wins
- World Championship: Snooker 1934–48; Billiards 1934, 1935, 1939

Ruth Harrison (10 May 1909 – 1991) was an English snooker and billiards player. She won the Women's Professional Snooker Championship each year from its inception in 1934 to 1940, and again when it was next held, in 1948. She also won the Women's Professional Billiards Championship three times.

== Biography ==
Harrison was born on 10 May 1909 in Lintz and was a coalminer's daughter (as was her fellow leading player Agnes Morris) and learnt to play at the institute in her village in County Durham.

She entered the 1931 World Ladies Billiards Championship, which was the first time she had played against women, and won the tournament. She turned professional straight afterwards. When the Women's Billiards Association was formed in 1931, Harrison was one of the four professional players appointed to a committee to organise the professional championships, along with Margaret Lennan, Eva Collins and Joyce Gardner.

She won the Women's Professional Snooker Championship each year from its inception in 1934 to 1940, and again when it was held after an interval of several years, in 1948.

Harrison also won the Women's Professional Billiards Championship three times, in 1934, 1935, and 1939. Her break of 197 in the 1937 championship is still the women's world record break in competition.

She received coaching from Willie Smith and Sidney Smith. Harrison qualified as a referee for billiards and snooker in 1937.

She died in 1991, aged 82.

== Titles and achievements ==
Snooker

Outcome	No.	Year	Championship	Opponent	Score	Ref.
Winner	1	1934	Women's Professional Snooker Championship	Joyce Gardner	7–6	
Winner	2	1935	Women's Professional Snooker Championship	Joyce Gardner	7–5	
Winner	3	1936	Women's Professional Snooker Championship	Thelma Carpenter	7–3	
Winner	4	1937	Women's Professional Snooker Championship	Joyce Gardner	9–4	
Winner	5	1938	Women's Professional Snooker Championship	Thelma Carpenter	11–2	
Winner	6	1939	Women's Professional Snooker Championship	Thelma Carpenter	8–5	
Winner	7	1940	Women's Professional Snooker Championship	Agnes Davies	11–2	
Winner	8	1948	Women's Professional Snooker Championship	Agnes Morris (née Davies)	16–14	

Billiards

Outcome	No.	Year	Championship	Opponent	Score	Ref.
Winner	1	1931	World Women’s Billiards Championship (amateur)	Mrs. Eddowes	1,000-581	
Runner-up	2	1932	Women's Professional Billiards Championship	Joyce Gardner	2,000–1,713	
Runner-up	3	1933	Women's Professional Billiards Championship	Joyce Gardner	1,306–2,000	
Winner	4	1934	Women's Professional Billiards Championship	Joyce Gardner	2,000–1,608	
Winner	5	1935	Women's Professional Billiards Championship	Joyce Gardner	3,000–2,708	
Runner-up	6	1937	Women's Professional Billiards Championship	Joyce Gardner	2,204–2,223	
Winner	7	1939	Women's Professional Billiards Championship	Joyce Gardner	2,559–1,792	
Runner-up	8	1940	Women's Professional Billiards Championship	Thelma Carpenter	1,641–2,184	
