= Lesley McIlrath =

Australian snooker player

Personal information
- Born: Australia

Sport
- Country: Australia
- Sport: Snooker

Lesley McIlrath is an Australian former snooker player. She won the Women's World Open Championship in 1980.

== Career ==
McIlrath was, with Fran Lovis, one of two of the dominant players in Australian snooker in the 1970s and 1980s.

The 1980 Women's World Open, recognised as the world championship for women was sponsored by Guinness, and held at Hayling Island. There were 45 entrants, and a record winner's prize for women's snooker, £700. In the last 16, McIlrath defeated Sue LeMaich 3–1; in the quarter-final she won 3–1 against Maryann McConnell 3–1; and she reached the final by defeating Ann Johnson 3–1 in the semi-final. Her opponent in the final, Agnes Davies, was aged 60 at the time, and went on to have a playing career spanning a total of 64 years. McIrath won the match 4–2 to capture the title.

The victory, in only the second Women's World Open Championship (following the first held in 1976), made McIlrath the first non-UK player to win. Coincidentally, Cliff Thorburn became the first non-UK winner of the men's World Snooker Championship the same year.

At the 1981 world championships, McIrath lost in the quarter-finals to Sue Foster, and in 1983 she lost 5–6 in the semi-final, again to Foster.

== Achievements ==
Source: Hamlyn Encyclopedia of Snooker

- 1976 Australian Championship - runner-up to Fran Lovis
- 1977 Australian Championship - runner-up to Fran Lovis
- 1979 Australian Championship - runner-up to Fran Lovis
- 1980 Australian Championship winner - beat Fran Lovis in the final
- 1980 Women's World Open champion - defeated Agnes Davies 4–2 in the final.
- 1981 Australian Championship winner – beat Ann Green in the final
- 1981 Pontins Champion
- 1982 Australian Championship – runner-up
