= Nicholas Crowson =

Nicholas Julian Crowson, FRHistS, is an academic historian. He is Professor of Contemporary British History at the University of Birmingham.

== Career ==
Crowson completed his Bachelor of Arts (BA) degree and doctoral studies at the University of Southampton, which awarded him a Doctor of Philosophy degree (PhD) in 1994. Between 1994 and 1996, he was a fellow in the Department of Politics at Queen's University Belfast. For the 1996–97 academic year, he was Director of Research at the Institute of Contemporary British History in the University of London. This was followed by an appointment at the Department of History in the University of Birmingham, where, as of 2017, he is a professor of Contemporary British History. He is a fellow of the Royal Historical Society.

== Research ==
Crowson's current research focuses on aspects of homelessness in modern Britain, particularly the lived experience and vagrancy. Past research has considered the history of modern British charities and non-governmental organisations as well as the history of the Conservative Party, especially with regard to foreign policy, appeasement and post-1945 European policy.

== Selected publications ==
- (with Matthew Hilton, Jean Francois-Mouhot and James McKay) A Historical Guide to NGOs in Britain: Charities, Civil Society and the Voluntary Sector since 1945 (Palgrave, 2012)
- "Revisiting the 1977 Housing (Homeless Persons) Act: Westminster, Whitehall, and the Homelessness Lobby", Twentieth Century British History, vol. 24, issue 3 (2012), pp. 424–447.
- (with James McKay) "Britain in Europe? Conservative and Labour attitudes to European integrations since World War Two", in William Mulligan and Brendan Simms (eds.), The Primacy of Foreign Policy in British History, 1660–2000 (Basingstoke: Palgrave, 2011)
- Britain and Europe: A Political History since 1918 (Palgrave, 2010)
- The Conservative Party and European Integration since 1945: At the Heart of Europe? (Routledge, 2006)
- "The Conservative Party and the Immigrant mid-1940s to mid-1970s", in S. Ball and I. Holliday (eds.), Mass Conservatism (London: Frank Cass, 2002), pp. 163–82
- "The Conservative Party and Europe since 1945", in R. Broad and V. Preston (eds.), Moored to the Continent: Britain and Europe (London: IHR/University of London Press, 2001), pp. 173–193
- "Lord Hinchingbrooke, Europe and the November 1962 South Dorset by-election", Contemporary British History, vol. 17, issue 4 (2003), pp. 43–64.
- The Longman Companion to the Conservative Party since 1830 (Longman, 2001)
- "'Much ado about nothing': Macmillan and Appeasement", in R. A. Aldous and S. Lee (eds.), Harold Macmillan: Aspects of a Political Life (Basingstoke: Macmillan, 1999), pp. 59–74
- "The Conservative Party and its attitude to national service 1937–1957", in A. Beech and R. Weight (eds.), The Right to Belong: Citizenship and National Identity in Britain 1920–60 (London: IB Tauris, 1998), pp. 205–22
- Fleet Street, Press Barons and Politics: The Journals of Collin Brooks, 1932–1940 (Cambridge University Press, 1998)
- Facing Fascism: The Conservative Party and the European Dictators 1935–40 (Routledge, 1997)
- "Conservative parliamentary dissent over foreign policy during the premiership of Neville Chamberlain: myth or reality?", Parliamentary History, vol. 14, issue 3 (1995), pp. 315–336
- "The Conservative Party and the question of national service 1937-39", Contemporary Record, vol. 9, issue 3 (1995), pp. 507–528.
