= Margaret Lennan =

Female snooker and billiards player

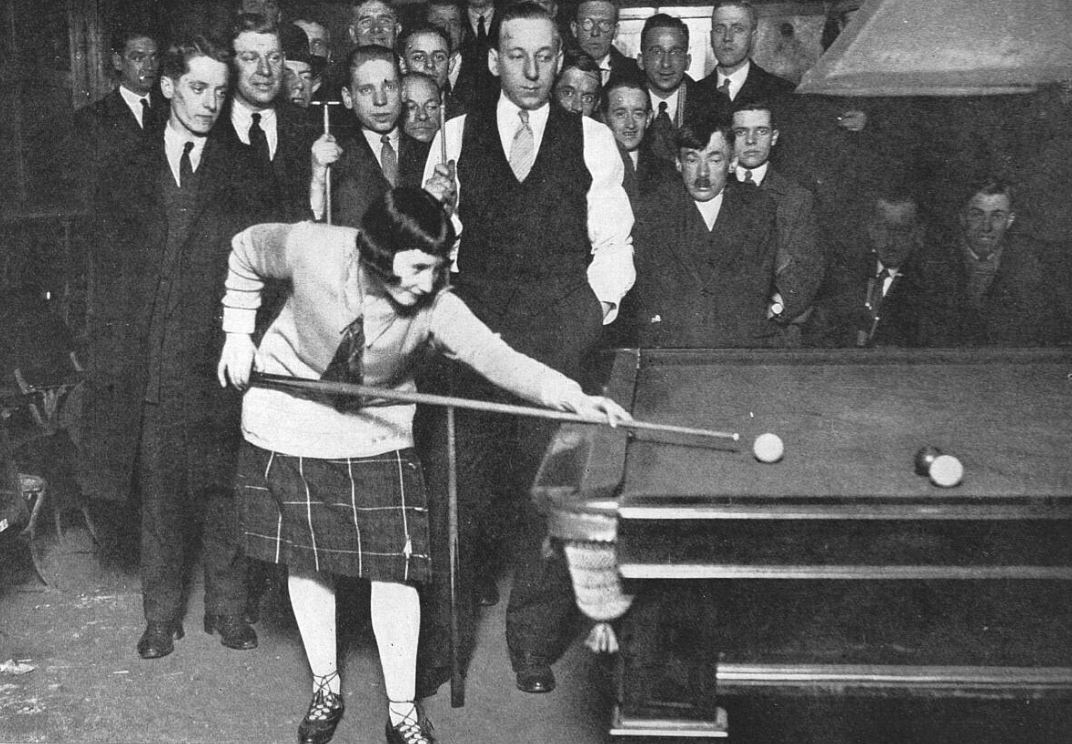
- Margaret Lennan playing English Billiards at a charity tournament in Liverpool in 1927

Personal information
- Born: circa 1910
- Died: Unknown

Sport
- Country: Scotland
- Sport: Snooker

- Best ranking finish: Runner-up, Women's Professional Billiards Championship, Nov 1935 (Note: The Championship was played in both February and November 1935, and not in 1936)

Margaret Lennan was a Scottish snooker and billiards player. She was runner-up in the 1936 Women's Professional Billiards Championship.

== Biography ==
Lennan started playing billiards at the age of 17, and received coaching from Alec Donaldson, father of future world snooker champion Walter Donaldson. She won a Ladies Billiards Championship in 1922.

in 1928 she won an unofficial "British Isles Championship" by beating Joyce Gardner, and the following year became the first woman to qualify as a billiards coach.

The Women's Billiards Association was formed in 1931, and Lennan was one of four professional players appointed to a committee to organise the professional championships, the others being Joyce Gardner, Ruth Harrison and Eva Collins.

She played in both Women's Professional Billiards Championship and the Women's Professional Snooker Championship in the 1930s, reaching the final of the Women's Professional Billiards Championship in 1936 and losing 2872–3000 to Joyce Gardner.

Collins was awarded a certificate from the Billiards Association and Control Council for the record break by a woman of 176, made on 3 February 1931 and another for her championship record break on 153 in the 1935 Women's Professional Billiards Championship This record was superseded by Ruth Harrison's break of 197 in 1937.

Lennan had moved from Glasgow to Hillesden, Prestbury, at the beginning of World War II, and given up billiards in 1942 due to the pressure of her war work. She said in 1946 that she had taken to playing golf instead of billiards.

== Titles and achievements ==
Snooker

Outcome	No.	Year	Championship	Opponent	Score	Ref.
Semi-finalist	1	1937	Women's Professional Snooker Championship	Joyce Gardner	4-5	
Semi-finalist	2	1938	Women's Professional Snooker Championship	Ruth Harrison	3-6	

Billiards

Outcome	No.	Year	Championship	Opponent	Score	Ref.
Runner-up	1	Nov 1935	Women's Professional Billiards Championship	Joyce Gardner	2,872–3,000	
