= Tom Carpenter =

English player of English billiards and snooker

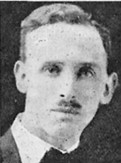
- Born: 31 August 1887; Newport, Wales
- Died: Unknown
- Sport country: England

Tom Carpenter (born 31 August 1887, date of death unknown) was an English player of English billiards and snooker.

== Biography ==
Carpenter was born in August 1887, to English parents, (Note: Riso Levi (1931) states that Carpenter was English, as his parents were. Other sources state that Carpenter was Welsh and the 1891 and 1901 censuses notes that his mother was a native of Rogerstone. The text of his book seems to imply that Levi had the mistaken belief that Monmouthshire was not part of Wales) at Newport, Wales, and later lived in Cardiff. He started playing English billiards at the age of seven, and made a century break at the age of ten.

He won the Welsh professional billiards title in 1913, beating Arthur Llewellin by 4,084 points in a match of 9,000-up. Llewellin had held the title for 22 years. Carpenter held the title until 1939, when he resigned it. In his 26-year reign as champion, he went 23 years without challenge.

Carpenter reached the semi-final of the inaugural professional World Snooker Championship in 1927. He also reached the 1928 World billiards championship semi-final.

In January 1922 at Cardiff, Carpenter played Joe Davis in a 7,000-up game of billiards. The game ended on 21 January 1922 and Tom lost by a single point.

He coached Thelma Carpenter (no relation), who won multiple billiards titles.
