= Agnes Davies =

Welsh snooker and billiards player (1920–2011)

Personal information
- Born: 30 September 1920 Saron, Carmarthenshire, Wales
- Died: 13 February 2011 (aged 90)

Sport
- Country: Wales
- Sport: Snooker
- Highest ranking: 46 (aged 77)

Agnes Davies (née Morris, 30 September 1920 – 13 February 2011) was a Welsh snooker and billiards player. She was known for having a competitive playing career spanning 64 years, during which she won the Women's Professional Snooker Championship in 1949, and was runner-up in 1940, 1948, 1950, and 1980.

== Biography ==
Davies learned how to play billiards in her father's billiard hall in Saron, which he had set up using his compensation payment for pneumoconiosis caused by working as a coal miner. She first won the Welsh women's amateur championship in 1939, and won the following two years as well.

Davies, then still known as Agnes Morris, was runner up in the 1940 Women's Professional Snooker championship and the winner in 1949. She was married to Dick Davies (who died in 1996) in 1940, and took a break of some 30 years from competitive snooker. Returning to competition in the late 1970s, she won three tournaments before reaching another world championship final in 1980. In 1985 Davies was Voted Life President of the World Ladies' Billiards and Snooker Association (WLBSA).

In 1998 she qualified for the Ladies Welsh Open at Newport, Wales at the age of 77 – sixty years after winning as a 17-year-old and was ranked 46 in the Embassy Ladies World Rankings for 1997/98.

Until 1999, Davies played in the home international series for Wales. She also played in the Amman Valley league until 2001.

Davies died in 2011.

== Legacy ==
In 2012, Women's World Snooker held the Agnes Davies Memorial tournament, which was won by Jaique Ip.

In June 2025 a Purple Plaque in Davies' memory was unveiled at Saron's Hall in Saron. The plaque, organised by Purple Plaques, was intended to highlight remarkable women in Wales.

== Titles and achievements ==
Outcome	No.	Year	Championship	Opponent	Score	Ref.
Winner	1	1937	Welsh Ladies' Snooker Champion			
Winner	2	1938	Welsh Ladies' Snooker Champion			
Winner	3	1939	Welsh Ladies' Snooker Champion			
Winner	4	1939	Welsh Ladies' Billiards Champion			
Winner	5	1939	Women's Amateur Snooker Championship			
Runner-up	6	1940	Women's Professional Snooker Championship	Ruth Harrison	2–11	
Runner-up	7	1948	Women's Professional Snooker Championship	Ruth Harrison	14–16	
Winner	8	1949	Women's Professional Snooker Championship	Thelma Carpenter	16–15	
Runner-up	9	1950	Women's Professional Snooker Championship	Thelma Carpenter	10–20	
Winner	10	1977	Pontins Ladies' Bowl Champion	Sue Foster	3–1	
Winner	11	1978	Women's Amateur Snooker Championship			
Runner-up	12	1979	Pontins Ladies' Bowl Champion	Maureen Baynton	0–3	
Runner-up	13	1980	Guinness World Women's Snooker Championship	Lesley McIlrath	2–4	
Winner	14	1982	Pontins Ladies' Bowl Champion	Sue Foster	3–0	
Runner-up	15	1999	Ladies Regal Scottish Masters seniors' (over 40s) final	Mary Hawkes	0–2	
Runner-up	16	2003	Ladies Regal Welsh Championship seniors' (over 40s) final	Maureen Twomey	1–2	
