= Billiards world rankings =

Ranking system for players of English billiards

The billiards world rankings are the official system of ranking English billiards players to determine automatic qualification and seeding for tournaments.

The rankings are maintained by the sport's governing body, World Billiards, a subsidiary of the World Professional Billiards and Snooker Association. A player's ranking is based on their performances in designated ranking tournaments. The ranking list rolls on at the end of each season, with every player's points being halved at the season switchover. A season begins on 1 July, and ends on 30 June of the following year.

As of 2012, the distinction between professional and amateur players was removed. Both male and female players are included on the list.

== Top Ranked Players ==
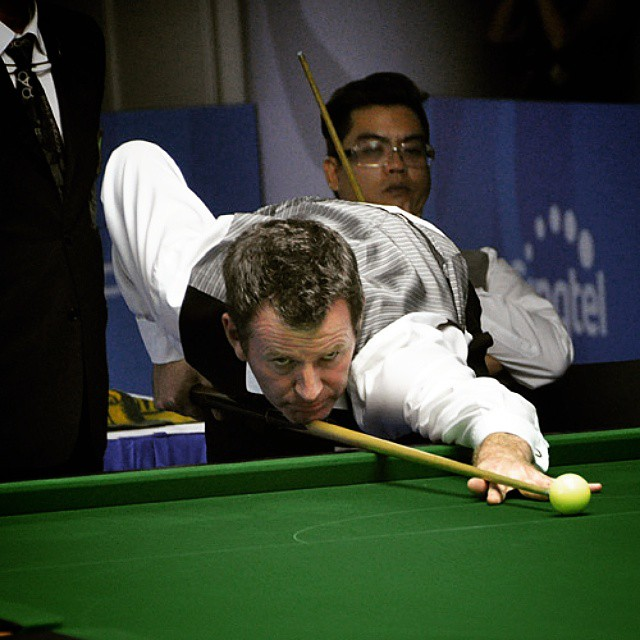
Peter Gilchrist, the top ranked player from 2016 to 2021

	Ranking			
Season	1	2	3	4
Before 1989	No information			
1989–90	(England) Mike Russell	(England) Norman Dagley	(England) Ian Williamson	(England) Peter Gilchrist
1990–91	(England) Mike Russell	(England) Peter Gilchrist	(England) Ian Williamson	(England) Norman Dagley
1991–92	(India) Geet Sethi	(England) Mike Russell	(Australia) Robby Foldvari	(England) Peter Gilchrist
1992–93	(India) Geet Sethi			
1993–94	(India) Geet Sethi	(Australia) Robby Foldvari	(England) Mike Russell	(England) Peter Gilchrist
1995–96	(England) Mike Russell	(India) Geet Sethi	(England) Peter Gilchrist	(Australia) Robby Foldvari
2002–03	(England) Mike Russell	(England) Peter Gilchrist	(England) David Causier	(England) Chris Shutt
2003–04	(England) Mike Russell	(England) Peter Gilchrist	(England) David Causier	(England) Chris Shutt
2004–10	No official ranking list produced			
2010–11	(England) David Causier	(India) Dhruv Sitwala	(Singapore) Peter Gilchrist and (England) Robert Hall^{1}	
2011–12	(England) David Causier	(England) Billy Bousfield	(England) Phil Mumford	(England) Robert Hall
2012–13	(England) Mike Russell	(England) Robert Hall	(England) David Causier	(England) Martin Goodwill
2013–14	(England) David Causier	(Singapore) Peter Gilchrist	(England) Robert Hall	(Australia) Matthew Bolton
2014–15	(England) David Causier	(Singapore) Peter Gilchrist	(England) Robert Hall	(England) Mike Russell
2015–16	(England) David Causier	(Singapore) Peter Gilchrist	(England) Robert Hall	(England) Mike Russell
2016–17	(Singapore) Peter Gilchrist	(England) David Causier	(England) Robert Hall	(England) Mike Russell
2017–18	(Singapore) Peter Gilchrist	(England) David Causier	(England) Robert Hall	(England) Mike Russell
2018–19	(Singapore) Peter Gilchrist	(England) David Causier	(England) Robert Hall	(England) Martin Goodwill
2019–20	(Singapore) Peter Gilchrist	(England) David Causier	(England) Robert Hall	(England) Ryan Mears
2020–21	(Singapore) Peter Gilchrist	(England) David Causier	(England) Robert Hall	(England) Ryan Mears

== Notes ==
^1 Gilchrist and Hall were joint 3rd ranked.
