= 2007 World Professional Billiards Championship =

Billiards tournament

The 2007 World Professional Billiards Championship, the top international professional competition in English billiards, was held between 18 and 22 July 2007 at the Northern Snooker Centre in Leeds, England. The 16 players were divided into four groups of four, with the top two in each group advancing into the knock-out round.

Mike Russell won his eighth World Professional Billiards Championship title, by defeating Chris Shutt 2166–1710 in the final.

== Prize fund ==
- Winner: £6,000
- Runner-up: £2,750
- Semi-final: £1,500
- Quarter-final: £750
- Group losers: £400
- Highest break: £350
- Total: £18,300

== Group round ==
=== Group A ===
Player	Score	Player	Score
(India) Geet Sethi	724	(India) Sourav Kothari	206
(England) Mike Russell	753	(England) Ian Williamson	294
(India) Geet Sethi	444	(England) Ian Williamson	379
(England) Mike Russell	1197	(India) Sourav Kothari	226
(India) Sourav Kothari	572	(England) Ian Williamson	341
(England) Mike Russell	1192	(India) Geet Sethi	236

Rank	Player	P	W	L	F	A
1	(England) Mike Russell	3	3	0	3142	756
2	(India) Geet Sethi	3	2	1	1404	1777
3	(India) Sourav Kothari	3	1	2	1004	2262
4	(England) Ian Williamson	3	0	3	1014	1769

=== Group B ===
Player	Score	Player	Score
(Singapore) Peter Gilchrist	769	(Austria) Michael Kreuziger	244
(India) Dhruv Sitwala	618	(India) Devendra Joshi	455
(Singapore) Peter Gilchrist	757	(India) Dhruv Sitwala	387
(India) Devendra Joshi	1111	(Austria) Michael Kreuziger	269
(Singapore) Peter Gilchrist	678	(India) Devendra Joshi	820
(Austria) Michael Kreuziger	208	(India) Dhruv Sitwala	763

Rank	Player	P	W	L	F	A
1	(India) Devendra Joshi	3	2	1	2386	1565
2	(Singapore) Peter Gilchrist	3	2	1	2204	1451
3	(India) Dhruv Sitwala	3	2	1	1768	1420
4	(Austria) Michael Kreuziger	3	0	3	721	2643

=== Group C ===
Player	Score	Player	Score
(India) Alok Kumar	621	(India) Ashok Shandilya	527
(India) Pankaj Advani	805	(England) Paul Bennett	400
(India) Ashok Shandilya	682	(India) Pankaj Advani	609
(England) Paul Bennett	590	(India) Alok Kumar	416
(India) Pankaj Advani	774	(India) Alok Kumar	520
(India) Ashok Shandilya	407	(England) Paul Bennett	449

Rank	Player	P	W	L	F	A
1	(India) Pankaj Advani	3	2	1	2188	1602
2	(England) Paul Bennett	3	2	1	1439	1628
3	(India) Ashok Shandilya	3	1	2	1616	1679
4	(India) Alok Kumar	3	1	2	1557	1894

=== Group D ===
Player	Score	Player	Score
(England) Chris Shutt	1076	(England) Mark Hirst	365
(England) David Causier	777	(Australia) Steve Mifsud	440
(England) Chris Shutt	1132	(Australia) Steve Mifsud	550
(England) David Causier	1058	(England) Mark Hirst	230
(Australia) Steve Mifsud	626	(England) Mark Hirst	545
(England) Chris Shutt	786	(England) David Causier	893

Rank	Player	P	W	L	F	A
1	(England) David Causier	3	3	0	2728	1456
2	(England) Chris Shutt	3	2	1	2994	1808
3	(Australia) Steve Mifsud	3	1	2	1616	2454
4	(England) Mark Hirst	3	0	3	1140	2760

== Knock-out round ==
Quarterfinals; 2½ hours		Semifinals; 4 hours		Final; 5 hours
(England) Mike Russell	1387
(Singapore) Peter Gilchrist	482	(England) Mike Russell	1835
(India) Geet Sethi	850	(India) Geet Sethi	1231
(India) Devendra Joshi	673			(England) Mike Russell	2166
(India) Pankaj Advani	859			(England) Chris Shutt	1710
(England) Chris Shutt	1074	(England) Chris Shutt	1698
(England) Paul Bennett	406	(England) David Causier	1464
(England) David Causier	1330
