= 1979 Castle Open =

Tournament information
- Dates: December 1978–22 January 1979
- Venue: Castle Snooker Club
- City: Southampton
- Country: England
- Organisation: Bernard Bennett
- Total prize fund: £3,500
- Winner's share: £750

Final
- Champion: Alex Higgins (NIR)
- Runner-up: Fred Davis (ENG)
- Score: 5–1

The 1979 Castle Open was a pro-am snooker tournament held from late 1978 to January 1979 at the Castle Snooker Club. It was won by Alex Higgins, who defeated Fred Davis 5–1 in the final.

The promoter, snooker professional Bernard Bennett, who owned the Castle Club, provided a prize fund of £3,500, including a first prize of £750. Almost all of the professional snooker players who were in the country at the time participated, alongside many of the leading amateurs. All matches were played on level terms; no handicaps were applied.

The tournament was played across two blocks. The earlier rounds featured amateurs and lower-ranked professionals, with higher-ranked professionals joining in the second block, held from 19 to 21 January 1979. Only two amateurs progressed to the second block: 16-year-old Jimmy White and 19-year-old Tony Meo. White defeated professionals Jack Karnehm and David Taylor, and Meo eliminated eight-time world champion John Pulman.

Terry Griffiths, who had turned professional that season, later wrote that, "The matches were short and the prize money not all that much but because the proprietor, Bernard Bennett, is a professional who is well liked in the snooker world, there was a good turn-out of professionals to support his tournament."

Fred Davis reached the final at the age of 65, having eliminated Willie Thorne and Cliff Thorburn during the tournament. He won the first frame, but lost 1–5 to Alex Higgins.

== Main Draw ==
Results from the sixth round onwards are shown below.

Sixth round
Cliff Thorburn (CAN)	4
Terry Griffiths (WAL)	2
Eddie Charlton (AUS)	1
Willie Thorne (ENG)	4
Perrie Mans (RSA)	4
Dennis Taylor (NIR)	2
Doug Mountjoy (WAL)	4
Graham Miles (ENG)	2

Quarter-finals
Ray Reardon (WAL)	3
Cliff Thorburn (CAN)	4
Fred Davis (ENG)	4
Willie Thorne (ENG)	3
Alex Higgins (NIR)	4
Perrie Mans (RSA)	0
John Spencer (ENG)	2
Doug Mountjoy (WAL)	4

Semi-finals
Cliff Thorburn (CAN)	4
Fred Davis (ENG)	1
Alex Higgins (NIR)	4
Doug Mountjoy (WAL)	3

Final
Fred Davis (ENG)	1
Alex Higgins (NIR)	5

== Earlier rounds ==
First round
Player	Score	Player
Tony O'Beirne (ENG)	4–1	T. McCarver (ENG)
J. Pike (ENG)	4–3	P. Marshall (ENG)
Steve Newbury (WAL)	4–2	B.Miltell (ENG)
Geoff Foulds (ENG)	4–2	S. Ross (ENG)
Vic Spetch (ENG)	4–1	Jack Fitzmaurice (ENG)
Bob Harris (ENG)	4–3	Mike Watterson (ENG)
John Beech (ENG)	4–3	O. Gilbert (ENG)
Ian Williamson (ENG)	4–2	B. Browne (ENG)
Mike Darrington (ENG)	4–1	Terry Whitthread (ENG)
Clive Everton (WAL)	4–0	P. Walker (ENG)
Jimmy White (ENG)	4–0	Wally Broomfield (ENG)
O. Clark (ENG)	4–1	Stan Haslam (ENG)
Brian Watson (ENG)	4–0	A. Watson (ENG)
George Eaton (ENG)	4–1	Nick Fairall (ENG)

Second round
Player	Score	Player
Tony O'Beirne (ENG)	4–1	J. Pike (ENG)
Geoff Foulds (ENG)	4–1	Steve Newbury (WAL)
Vic Spetch (ENG)	4–2	Bob Harris (ENG)
Ian Williamson (ENG)	4–0	John Beech (ENG)
Mike Darrington (ENG)	4–3	Clive Everton (WAL)
Jimmy White (ENG)	4–3	O. Clark (ENG)
Brian Watson (ENG)	4–0	D. Edwards (ENG)
Tony Meo (ENG)	4–0	George Eaton (ENG)

Third round
Player	Score	Player
Steve Davis (ENG)	4–3	Tony O'Beirne (ENG)
Terry Griffiths (WAL)	4–1	Geoff Foulds (ENG)
Pat Houlihan (ENG)	4–1	Spetch (ENG)
John Barrie (ENG)	4–1	Ian Williamson (ENG)
Mike Darrington (ENG)	w.o.	David Greaves (ENG)
Jimmy White (ENG)	4–1	Jack Karnehm (ENG)
Ray Edmonds (ENG)	4–1	Brian Watson (ENG)
Tony Meo (ENG)	w.o.	Roy Andrewartha (ENG)

Fourth round
Player	Score	Player
Steve Davis (ENG)	4–1	Jim Meadowcroft (ENG)
Terry Griffiths (WAL)	4–1	Bill Werbeniuk (CAN)
Pat Houlihan (ENG)	4–1	Bernard Bennett (ENG)
Willie Thorne (ENG)	4– 1	John Barrie (ENG)
John Virgo (ENG)	4–3	Mike Darrington (ENG)
Jimmy White (ENG)	4–2	David Taylor (ENG)
Ray Edmonds (ENG)	4–2	John Dunning (ENG)
Tony Meo (ENG)	4–0	John Pulman (ENG)

Fifth round
Player	Score	Player
Cliff Thorburn (CAN)	4–3	Steve Davis (ENG)
Terry Griffiths (WAL)	4–3	Rex Williams (ENG)
Eddie Charlton (AUS)	4–3	Pat Houlihan (ENG)
Willie Thorne (ENG)	4–1	Patsy Fagan (IRE)
Perrie Mans (RSA)	4–2	John Virgo (ENG)
Dennis Taylor (NIR)	4–0	Jimmy White (ENG)
Doug Mountjoy (WAL)	4–2	Ray Edmonds (ENG)
Graham Miles (ENG)	4–3	Tony Meo (ENG)
