= World Snooker Tour awards =

The World Snooker Tour produces annual awards in several categories, including player of the year.

The Association of Snooker Writers, founded by a group of journalists who wrote about snooker in 1981, first instituted awards for players and others associated with the game in 1983. From 1985, the awards were taken over by the World Professional Billiards and Snooker Association. In 1998, the journalists' group was reformed as the Snooker Writers' Association, and the awards were in that body's name for several years. The awards are now administered by the World Snooker Tour.

== List of awardees ==
Snooker Writers' Association and WPBSA Awards
Awarding body	Year	Player of the Year	Personality of the Year	Young Player of the Year	Match of the Year	Other awards	Ref.
Association of Snooker Writers	1983	Steve Davis	Bill Werbeniuk	Tony Jones			
Association of Snooker Writers	1984	Steve Davis	Dennis Taylor				
WPBSA	1985	Dennis Taylor	Dennis Taylor	John Parrott			
WPBSA	1986	Steve Davis; Joe Johnson	Joe Johnson	Stephen Hendry			
WPBSA	1987	Steve Davis	Joe Johnson	Stephen Hendry	Jimmy White v Steve Davis (last frame of the 1987 Classic final (Note: Frame of the Year))	Overseas Player of the Year: Dene O'Kane Highest Break of the season: Jimmy White Billiards player of the year: Norman Dagley	
WPBSA	1988	Steve Davis	Terry Griffiths	Stephen Hendry	Stephen Hendry v Jimmy White (last frame of the 1988 World Championship final)	Break of the year: Steve Davis and Steve James (140) Overseas Player of the Year: Tony Drago Billiards player of the year: Norman Dagley	
WPBSA	1989	Steve Davis		Martin Clark (Note: Newcomer of the year)	John Parrott v Steve James (1989 World Championship)	Billiards player of the year: Mike Russell	
WPBSA	1990	Stephen Hendry		Nigel Bond			
WPBSA	1991	Stephen Hendry		Alan McManus			
WPBSA	1992	Stephen Hendry		Peter Ebdon			
WPBSA	1993	Stephen Hendry		Ronnie O'Sullivan			
WPBSA	1994	Ronnie O'Sullivan		Fergal O'Brien			
WPBSA	1995	Stephen Hendry		Tai Pichit			
WPBSA	1996	Stephen Hendry	Stephen Hendry (Note: BBC Viewers Choice Award)	Paul Hunter		Billiards player of the year: Mike Russell	
WPBSA	1997	Stephen Hendry	Steve Davis	Lee Walker		Break of the year: Ronnie O'Sullivan Billiards player of the year: Mike Russell	
Snooker Writers' Association	1998	John Higgins		Paul Hunter	Mark Williams v Stephen Hendry (1998 Masters)		
Snooker Writers' Association	1999	Stephen Hendry		Marco Fu			
Snooker Writers' Association	2000	Mark Williams					
Snooker Writers' Association	2001	Ronnie O'Sullivan					
Snooker Writers' Association	2002	Stephen Lee					
WPBSA	2003	Mark Williams					
WPBSA	2004	Ronnie O'Sullivan		Stephen Maguire			
WPBSA	2005	Ronnie O'Sullivan					
WPBSA	2006	John Higgins					
WPBSA	2007	Neil Robertson					
WPBSA	2008	Ronnie O'Sullivan					
WPBSA	2009	John Higgins					
2010: no awards

World Snooker Tour Awards
Awarding body	Year	WST Player of the Year	Snooker Journalists' Player of the Year	Fans' Player of the Year	Rookie of the Year	Performance of the Year	Magic Moment of the Year	Breakthrough of the Year	Ref.
World Snooker Tour	2011	John Higgins	John Higgins	Judd Trump	Jack Lisowski	Judd Trump	Rory McLeod		
World Snooker Tour	2012	Ronnie O'Sullivan	Ronnie O'Sullivan	Judd Trump	Luca Brecel	Stuart Bingham	Stephen Hendry		
World Snooker Tour	2013	Mark Selby	Mark Selby	Mark Selby	Ian Burns	Ronnie O'Sullivan	Jimmy Robertson		
World Snooker Tour	2014	Ronnie O'Sullivan	Ding Junhui	Ronnie O'Sullivan	John Astley	Mark Selby	Mark Selby		
World Snooker Tour	2015	Stuart Bingham	Stuart Bingham	Judd Trump	Oliver Lines	Joe Perry	Ronnie O'Sullivan		
World Snooker Tour	2016	John Higgins	Mark Selby	Ronnie O'Sullivan	Darryl Hill	Mark Selby	Steve Davis		
World Snooker Tour	2017	Mark Selby	Mark Selby	Mark Selby	Yan Bingtao	Anthony Hamilton	Mark King		
World Snooker Tour	2018	Ronnie O'Sullivan	Mark Williams	Ronnie O'Sullivan	Xu Si	Mark Williams	Michael Georgiou		
World Snooker Tour	2019	Judd Trump	Judd Trump	Ronnie O'Sullivan	Joe O'Connor	James Cahill	Ronnie O'Sullivan		
World Snooker Tour	2020	Judd Trump	Judd Trump	Judd Trump	Louis Heathcote	Ronnie O'Sullivan	John Higgins		
World Snooker Tour	2021	Judd Trump	Mark Selby	Judd Trump	Pang Junxu	Mark Selby	Neil Robertson		
World Snooker Tour	2022	Neil Robertson	Ronnie O'Sullivan	Zhao Xintong	Wu Yize	Ronnie O'Sullivan	Neil Robertson		
World Snooker Tour	2023	Mark Allen	Mark Allen	Mark Allen	Julien Leclercq	Luca Brecel	Mark Selby (Maximum break at the 2023 World Snooker Championship)	Si Jiahui	
World Snooker Tour	2024	Ronnie O'Sullivan	Ronnie O'Sullivan	Ronnie O'Sullivan	He Guoqiang	Kyren Wilson	Shaun Murphy (Maximum break at the 2023 Shoot Out)	Zhang Anda (2023 International Championship)	
World Snooker Tour	2025	Judd Trump	Kyren Wilson	Judd Trump	Bai Yulu	Zhao Xintong	Judd Trump (2024 Saudi Arabia Masters final)	Xiao Guodong (2024 Wuhan Open)	
World Snooker Tour	2026	Zhao Xintong	Zhao Xintong	Wu Yize	Michał Szubarczyk	Ronnie O'Sullivan	Jack Lisowski (2025 Northern Ireland Open final)	Chang Bingyu	

=== Hall of Fame ===
The World Snooker hall of fame was instituted in 2011, with eight winners of multiple world snooker championships as the initial inductees.

Hall of Fame
Year	Awardee(s)	Ref.
2011	Joe Davis, Fred Davis, John Pulman, Ray Reardon, John Spencer, Alex Higgins, Steve Davis and Stephen Hendry	
2012	Walter Donaldson, Mark Williams, John Higgins and Ronnie O'Sullivan	
2013	Terry Griffiths, Joe Johnson, Ken Doherty, Peter Ebdon, Shaun Murphy and Neil Robertson	(Note: Previously also included Graeme Dott, until his removal in 2026.)
2014	Dennis Taylor and Cliff Thorburn	
2015	John Parrott and Mark Selby	
2016	Stuart Bingham, Rex Williams and Sindhu Pulsirivong	
2017	Jimmy White and Clive Everton	
2018	Ding Junhui and Barry Hearn	
2021	Judd Trump and Brandon Parker	
2022	Reanne Evans and Allison Fisher	
2023	John Virgo	
2024	Luca Brecel and Daniel Blunn	
2025	Kyren Wilson	
2026	Zhao Xintong and Mark Allen	

== Former awards ==
=== Services to snooker award ===
Services to Snooker Awards
Year	Awardee	Notes
1983	Mike Watterson	
1984	Clive Everton	
1985	Del Simmonds	Promoter and administrator
1986	Rex Williams	
1987	Barry Hearn	
1988	Howard Kruger	Manager of several leading players
1990	John Spencer	
1991	Eddie Charlton	
1994	Ray Reardon	
1996	Rick Waumsley	BBC snooker coverage
1998	Jonathan Martin	BBC Sport
1999	Jim Elkins	Tournament director for the Masters
2000	David Vine; Len Ganley	
2001	John Williams	

=== Achievement of the year ===
Performance of the Year/Achievement of the Year awards
Year	Awardee	Notes
1987 (Note: Performance of the year)	Joe Johnson	Reaching the World Snooker Championship final in two consecutive years
1988	Steve James	Performance at the 1988 World Snooker Championship
1995	Stephen Hendry	Seven century breaks in the 1995 World Snooker Championship final
1996	Nigel Bond	Winning British Open final after needing a snooker in the final frame
1996	Mark Williams	Winning the Welsh Open while ranked 39th
1997	Ken Doherty	Winning the 1997 World Snooker Championship
1998	Mark Williams	Recovering from 0–6 to win Masters final on re-spotted black
1999	Stephen Hendry	Winning a seventh World Snooker Championship
2000	Joe Swail	Reaching the 2000 World Snooker Championship semi-finals
2001	Paul Hunter	Winning the 2001 Masters final from 3–7 behind
2002	Peter Ebdon	Winning the 2002 World Snooker Championship
2003	Ken Doherty	Winning the 2003 World Snooker Championship semi-final against Paul Hunter
2004	Jimmy White	First ranking title for eleven years
2005	Shaun Murphy	Winning the 2005 World Snooker Championship
2006	Graeme Dott	Winning the 2006 World Snooker Championship
2007	Andrew Higginson	Reaching the 2007 Welsh Open final
2008	Mark Selby	Winning the Masters at his first attempt

=== Special awards ===
Special Awards
Year	Awardee	Notes
1984	Mike Green	Retiring secretary of the WPBSA
1987	Jackie Rea	40 years as a professional player
1988	Fred Davis	Playing professionally at the age of 75
1989	Nick Hunter	BBC snooker producer
1993	John Pulman	Former world champion
1995	John Higgins	Winner of three ranking titles in a season
1996	Ted Lowe	BBC commentator, 50 years associated with snooker
1996	Peter Dyke	Promoter, who recommended to Embassy that they should sponsor the World Championship
1997	Mark Wildman	Services to English billiards
1998	Jimmy White	Defeat of Stephen Hendry at the 1998 World Snooker Championship
2000	Steve Davis	20 years as a top-16 ranked player
2001	John Dee	Snooker journalist
2004	Peter Dyke	Promoter
2005	John Spencer	Professional player, administrator and commentator
2006	Richard Balani	Promoter of snooker events in Malta
2007	Clive Everton	Journalist and commentator
2008	Barry Hearn	30 years as a tournament promoter and manager of snooker players
