= European Tour 2012/2013 – Event 4 =

Betfair European Tour 2012/2013 Event 4

Tournament information
- Dates: 15–18 November 2012
- Venue: Princess Hotel
- City: Sofia
- Country: Bulgaria
- Organisation: World Snooker
- Format: Minor-ranking event
- Total prize fund: €73,111
- Winner's share: €12,000
- Highest break: Tom Ford (ENG) (147)

Final
- Champion: Judd Trump (ENG)
- Runner-up: John Higgins (SCO)
- Score: 4–0

The Betfair European Tour 2012/2013 – Event 4 (also known as the 2012 Victoria Bulgarian Open) was a professional minor-ranking snooker tournament that took place between 15 and 18 November 2012 at the Princess Hotel in Sofia, Bulgaria. This was the first professional snooker tournament held in Bulgaria.

Tom Ford made the 92nd official maximum break during his last 32 match against Matthew Stevens. This was Ford's second official 147 break and also the fourth maximum break in the 2012/2013 season.

Judd Trump won his ninth professional title by defeating John Higgins 4–0 in the final.

== Prize fund and ranking points ==
The breakdown of prize money and ranking points of the event is shown below:

| | Prize fund | Ranking points^{1} |
|---|---|---|
| Winner | €12,000 | 2,000 |
| Runner-up | €6,000 | 1,600 |
| Semi-finalist | €3,000 | 1,280 |
| Quarter-finalist | €2,000 | 1,000 |
| Last 16 | €1,250 | 760 |
| Last 32 | €750 | 560 |
| Last 64 | €500 | 360 |
| Maximum break | €3,111 | – |
| Total | €73,111 | – |

- ^{1} Only professional players can earn ranking points.

== Main draw ==
=== Preliminary round ===
Best of 7 frames

| (England) John Parkin | 4–3 | (England) Christopher Keogan |
| (England) Stuart Carrington | w/d–w/o | (Greece) Dimitris Economou |
| (England) Justin Astley | 4–0 | (England) Dean Goddard |
| (Bulgaria) Bratislav Krustev | 1–4 | (Poland) Kacper Filipiak |
| (Wales) Jak Jones | w/d–w/o | (England) Mitchell Mann |
| (England) Adam Wicheard | w/o–w/d | (England) Kyren Wilson |
| (Bulgaria) Vencislav Daskalov | 4–1 | (Romania) Cosmin Constantin |
| (England) Reanne Evans | 2–4 | (Belgium) Alain Van Der Steen |
| (England) Gary Steele | w/o–w/d | (Netherlands) Gerrit bij de Leij |

| (Bulgaria) Krasimir Kameshev | 0–4 | (Bulgaria) Nikola Kemilev |
| (Bulgaria) Nikolai Vlashev | 1–4 | (Bulgaria) Georgi Velichkov |
| (Pakistan) Arshed Chodri | 0–4 | (Bulgaria) Dimitar Mehandjiiski |
| (Wales) Gareth Allen | 4–1 | (Romania) Radu Vilău |
| (England) James Cahill | 4–1 | (Bulgaria) Ivan Kupov |
| (England) Oliver Lines | 2–4 | (England) Matthew Day |
| (Bulgaria) Salim Otti | 1–4 | (Bulgaria) Ivaylo Pekov |
| (Ukraine) Tetyana Volovelska | 0–4 | (Malta) Aaron Busuttil |

=== Main rounds ===
==== Top half ====
===== Section 1 =====
Last 128; Best of 7 frames
(England) Mark Selby | 4
(Bulgaria) Damail Tugov | 0
(Thailand) Dechawat Poomjaeng | w/o
(England) Ben Harrison | w/d
(England) Chris Norbury | 4
(Greece) Konstantinos Mavroforos | 0
(England) Jack Lisowski | 4
(England) Michael Wasley | 2
(England) Robbie Williams | 3
(Wales) Daniel Wells | 4
(England) Allan Taylor | 3
(Wales) Matthew Stevens | 4
(England) Tom Ford | 4
(England) John Parkin | 1
(England) Robert Milkins | 4
(Bulgaria) Stanislav Hadvipopov | 0

Last 64; Best of 7 frames
(England) Mark Selby | 4
(Thailand) Dechawat Poomjaeng | 3
(England) Chris Norbury | 1
(England) Jack Lisowski | 4
(Wales) Daniel Wells | 2
(Wales) Matthew Stevens | 4
(England) Tom Ford | 4
(England) Robert Milkins | 2

Last 32; Best of 7 frames
(England) Mark Selby | 3
(England) Jack Lisowski | 4
(Wales) Matthew Stevens | 1
(England) Tom Ford | 4

Last 16; Best of 7 frames
(England) Jack Lisowski | 1
(England) Tom Ford | 4

===== Section 2 =====
Last 128; Best of 7 frames
(Thailand) Thepchaiya Un-Nooh | w/o
(Greece) Dimitris Economou | w/d
(England) David Grace | 3
(Malta) Tony Drago | 4
(England) John Astley | 4
(England) Jeff Cundy | 2
(Scotland) Alan McManus | 4
(England) Justin Astley | 2
(England) Mark Davis | 4
(Poland) Kacper Filipiak | 3
(Belgium) Luca Brecel | 4
(England) Mitchell Mann | 1
(England) Paul Davison | 4
(China) Zhang Anda | 0
(England) Joe Perry | 4
(England) Adam Duffy | 0

Last 64; Best of 7 frames
(Thailand) Thepchaiya Un-Nooh | 4
(Malta) Tony Drago | 2
(England) John Astley | 1
(Scotland) Alan McManus | 4
(England) Mark Davis | 4
(Belgium) Luca Brecel | 0
(England) Paul Davison | 4
(England) Joe Perry | 2

Last 32; Best of 7 frames
(Thailand) Thepchaiya Un-Nooh | 4
(Scotland) Alan McManus | 1
(England) Mark Davis | 4
(England) Paul Davison | 2

Last 16; Best of 7 frames
(Thailand) Thepchaiya Un-Nooh | 2
(England) Mark Davis | 4

===== Section 3 =====
Last 128; Best of 7 frames
(India) Pankaj Advani | 3
(England) Nigel Bond | 4
(England) Dave Harold | 4
(England) Adam Wicheard | 3
(Norway) Kurt Maflin | 4
(Bulgaria) Vencislav Daskalov | 0
(Wales) Ryan Day | 2
(England) Elliot Slessor | 4
(England) Judd Trump | 4
(England) Martin O'Donnell | 1
(Hong Kong) Marco Fu | w/d
(England) Michael Wild | w/o
(Wales) Michael White | 1
(India) Aditya Mehta | 4
(England) Steve Davis | 4
(Scotland) Michael Leslie | 0

Last 64; Best of 7 frames
(England) Nigel Bond | 3
(England) Dave Harold | 4
(Norway) Kurt Maflin | 4
(England) Elliot Slessor | 0
(England) Judd Trump | 4
(England) Michael Wild | 0
(India) Aditya Mehta | 4
(England) Steve Davis | 2

Last 32; Best of 7 frames
(England) Dave Harold | 4
(Norway) Kurt Maflin | 3
(England) Judd Trump | 4
(India) Aditya Mehta | 2

Last 16; Best of 7 frames
(England) Dave Harold | 1
(England) Judd Trump | 4

===== Section 4 =====
Last 128; Best of 7 frames
(England) Andrew Higginson | 4
(Belgium) Alain Van Der Steen | 0
(England) Jimmy Robertson | 4
(Thailand) Thanawat Thirapongpaiboon | 2
(England) Andrew Norman | 4
(England) Gary Steele | 0
(Scotland) Scott Donaldson | w/o
(Finland) Robin Hull | w/d
(Scotland) Anthony McGill | 4
(England) Jonathan Mabey | 1
(Republic of Ireland) Fergal O'Brien | 4
(Bulgaria) Nikola Kemilev | 0
(England) Martin Gould | 4
(China) Liu Chuang | 0
(England) Barry Hawkins | 4
(England) Liam Monk | 1

Last 64; Best of 7 frames
(England) Andrew Higginson | 4
(England) Jimmy Robertson | 0
(England) Andrew Norman | 4
(Scotland) Scott Donaldson | 2
(Scotland) Anthony McGill | 4
(Republic of Ireland) Fergal O'Brien | 2
(England) Martin Gould | 0
(England) Barry Hawkins | 4

Last 32; Best of 7 frames
(England) Andrew Higginson | 4
(England) Andrew Norman | 3
(Scotland) Anthony McGill | 4
(England) Barry Hawkins | 0

Last 16; Best of 7 frames
(England) Andrew Higginson | 4
(Scotland) Anthony McGill | 2

==== Bottom half ====
===== Section 5 =====
Last 128; Best of 7 frames
(Northern Ireland) Mark Allen | 4
(England) Sam Harvey | 0
(England) Craig Steadman | 4
(Germany) Phil Barnes | 3
(England) Mark King | 1
(England) Barry Pinches | 4
(Scotland) John Higgins | 4
(Bulgaria) Georgi Velichkov | 0
(England) Shaun Murphy | 4
(Thailand) Passakorn Suwannawat | 1
(China) Liang Wenbo | 4
(Romania) Rareș Șinca | 0
(Republic of Ireland) Ken Doherty | 4
(Bulgaria) Dimitar Mehandjiiski | 0
(Wales) Andrew Pagett | 0
(England) Oliver Brown | 4

Last 64; Best of 7 frames
(Northern Ireland) Mark Allen | 1
(England) Craig Steadman | 4
(England) Barry Pinches | 1
(Scotland) John Higgins | 4
(England) Shaun Murphy | 2
(China) Liang Wenbo | 4
(Republic of Ireland) Ken Doherty | 4
(England) Oliver Brown | 1

Last 32; Best of 7 frames
(England) Craig Steadman | 2
(Scotland) John Higgins | 4
(China) Liang Wenbo | 4
(Republic of Ireland) Ken Doherty | 3

Last 16; Best of 7 frames
(Scotland) John Higgins | 4
(China) Liang Wenbo | 2

===== Section 6 =====
Last 128; Best of 7 frames
(England) Simon Bedford | 2
(England) Mark Vincent | 4
(England) Stephen Lee | w/d
(China) Li Yan | w/o
(China) Xiao Guodong | 4
(Wales) Gareth Allen | 3
(England) Alfie Burden | 4
(Northern Ireland) Gerard Greene | 2
(England) Rory McLeod | 4
(Australia) Ben Judge | 0
(Wales) Dominic Dale | 4
(England) Peter Lines | 2
(England) Ricky Walden | 4
(England) Ian Glover | 2
(England) Gary Wilson | 4
(Bulgaria) Vergil Mavrodiev | 0

Last 64; Best of 7 frames
(England) Mark Vincent | 2
(China) Li Yan | 4
(China) Xiao Guodong | 3
(England) Alfie Burden | 4
(England) Rory McLeod | 4
(Wales) Dominic Dale | 3
(England) Ricky Walden | 1
(England) Gary Wilson | 4

Last 32; Best of 7 frames
(China) Li Yan | 4
(England) Alfie Burden | 3
(England) Rory McLeod | 4
(England) Gary Wilson | 3

Last 16; Best of 7 frames
(China) Li Yan | 1
(England) Rory McLeod | 4

===== Section 7 =====
Last 128; Best of 7 frames
(China) Tian Pengfei | 4
(England) Joel Walker | 2
(England) Ali Carter | 4
(Bulgaria) Luchezar Gergov | 0
(England) Jimmy White | 2
(China) Cao Yupeng | 4
(England) Jamie Cope | 4
(England) James Cahill | 1
(England) Mark Joyce | 4
(England) Matthew Day | 2
(Wales) Mark Williams | 4
(Wales) Jack Bradford | 0
(England) Stuart Bingham | 3
(England) Peter Ebdon | 4
(England) Ben Woollaston | 4
(England) Sean O'Sullivan | 2

Last 64; Best of 7 frames
(China) Tian Pengfei | 2
(England) Ali Carter | 4
(China) Cao Yupeng | 2
(England) Jamie Cope | 4
(England) Mark Joyce | 1
(Wales) Mark Williams | 4
(England) Peter Ebdon | 3
(England) Ben Woollaston | 4

Last 32; Best of 7 frames
(England) Ali Carter | 0
(England) Jamie Cope | 4
(Wales) Mark Williams | 0
(England) Ben Woollaston | 4

Last 16; Best of 7 frames
(England) Jamie Cope | 1
(England) Ben Woollaston | 4

===== Section 8 =====
Last 128; Best of 7 frames
(China) Yu Delu | 4
(Belgium) Tomasz Skalski | 3
(England) Rod Lawler | 4
(Bulgaria) Ivaylo Pekov | 1
(Wales) Jamie Jones | 4
(England) Joe Steele | 1
(Northern Ireland) Joe Swail | 2
(Scotland) Marcus Campbell | 4
(England) Michael Holt | 4
(Malta) Aaron Busuttil | 0
(England) Anthony Hamilton | 4
(England) Matthew Selt | 2
(England) Ian Burns | 3
(England) Ryan Causton | 4
(Australia) Neil Robertson | 4
(Belgium) Hans Blanckaert | 2

Last 64; Best of 7 frames
(China) Yu Delu | 4
(England) Rod Lawler | 0
(Wales) Jamie Jones | 3
(Scotland) Marcus Campbell | 4
(England) Michael Holt | 2
(England) Anthony Hamilton | 4
(England) Ryan Causton | 1
(Australia) Neil Robertson | 4

Last 32; Best of 7 frames
(China) Yu Delu | 2
(Scotland) Marcus Campbell | 4
(England) Anthony Hamilton | 2
(Australia) Neil Robertson | 4

Last 16; Best of 7 frames
(Scotland) Marcus Campbell | 2
(Australia) Neil Robertson | 4

==== Finals ====
| Quarter-finals; Best of 7 frames | | Semi-finals; Best of 7 frames | | Final; Best of 7 frames |
| (England) Tom Ford | 2 |
| (England) Mark Davis | 4 | (England) Mark Davis | 2 |
| (England) Judd Trump | 4 | (England) Judd Trump | 4 |
| (England) Andrew Higginson | 0 | | | (England) Judd Trump | 4 |
| (Scotland) John Higgins | 4 | | | (Scotland) John Higgins | 0 |
| (England) Rory McLeod | 0 | (Scotland) John Higgins | 4 |
| (England) Ben Woollaston | 2 | (Australia) Neil Robertson | 2 |
| (Australia) Neil Robertson | 4 |

== Century breaks ==
- 147, 116, 103 – Tom Ford
- 140, 122 – Paul Davison
- 139, 102 – Dave Harold
- 136, 131 – Mark Selby
- 133, 106 – Andrew Higginson
- 132, 118, 107 – Mark Davis
- 132, 103 – Ricky Walden
- 132 – Robert Milkins
- 130 – Simon Bedford
- 128, 108 – Liang Wenbo
- 127, 102 – Mark Williams
- 126 – Ken Doherty
- 125 – Mark Allen
- 125 – Yu Delu
- 124, 113 – Aditya Mehta
- 123, 121, 119, 115, 107 – Judd Trump
- 115 – Shaun Murphy
- 114 – Marcus Campbell
- 110 – John Higgins
- 109 – Jamie Jones
- 104, 100 – Neil Robertson
- 104 – Matthew Stevens
- 104 – Thepchaiya Un-Nooh
- 103 – Alan McManus
- 101 – Barry Hawkins
- 100 – Fergal O'Brien
