= Castle Snooker Club =

Billiard hall in Southampton, England, 1970–2007

Coordinates: 50°53′57″N 1°24′17″W

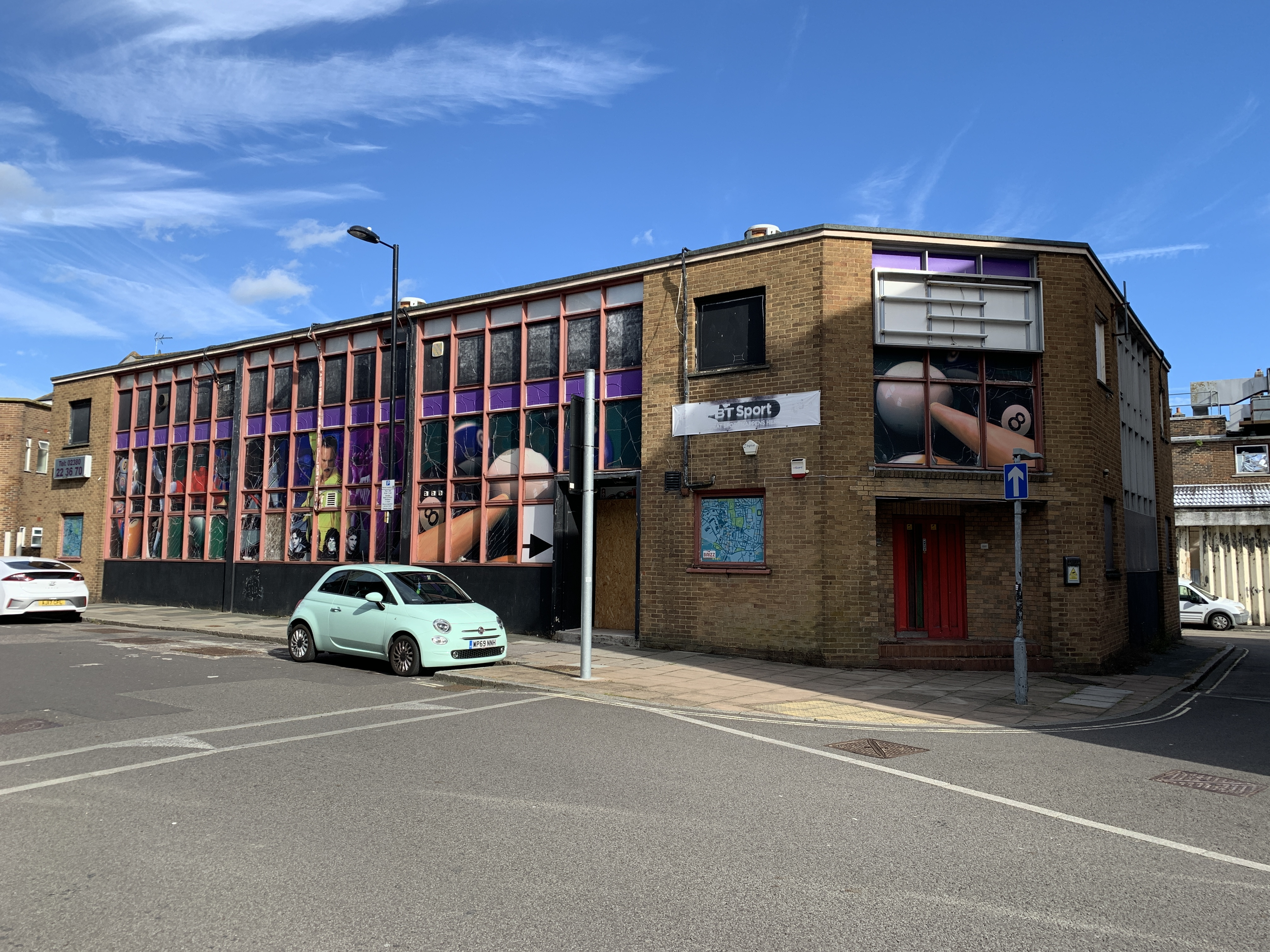
Premises of the Castle Club (pictured in 2021)

The Castle Snooker Club was a billiard hall at 57-59 Castle Way, Southampton, England.

== History ==
It was opened in 1970 by professional snooker player Bernard Bennett. Snooker historian Clive Everton described it as "the earliest of the new-style snooker establishments which were to replace the dingy, disreputable billiard halls of old."

It was the venue for Bennett's 1971 challenge match against Rex Williams for the World Billiards Championship. Williams retained the title, winning by 9,250 point to 4,058. The 1972 World Snooker Championship qualifying match between Bennett and Graham Miles was held at the club; Miles won 15–6.

As of 1999, professional player Duncan Moore coached at the club. Bennett died in 2002, having seen the Club recognised as an accredited centre by snooker's governing body. The club closed in June 2007.

== Castle Open ==
The Castle Open was a pro-am snooker tournament staged at the Club several times during the 1970s. The Billiard Association and Control Council's official magazine Billiards and Snooker described the first edition, which commenced in October 1970, as "the most ambitious Open Snooker tournament ever promoted in Britain". Six professional players entered: Bennett, Ron Gross, Pat Houlihan, Jack Rea, David Taylor, and Rex Williams. Chris Ross was among the amateur participants.

The 1978/79 edition, which had a prize fund of £3,500 attracted almost all of the professional players who were in the country at the time. Terry Griffiths, who had turned professional that season, later wrote that, "The matches were short and the prize money not all that much but because the proprietor, Bernard Bennett, is a professional who is well liked in the snooker world, there was a good turn-out of professionals to support his tournament." Fred Davis reached the final at the age of 65, having eliminated Willie Thorne and Cliff Thorburn during the tournament. He lost 1–5 to Alex Higgins.

Castle Open
Year	Winner	Runner-up	Final score	Ref.
1970	Rex Williams (ENG)	John Colpus (ENG) (Note: Amateur; received 7 points per frame handicap)	7–4	
1971	Geoff Thompson (ENG)	John Pulman (ENG)	9–2	
1972	(England) John Beech	(Wales) Ray Reardon	4–3	
1973	(England) Graham Miles	(England) Jim Meadowcroft	4–1	
1975	Alex Higgins (NIR)	John Spencer (ENG)	5–2	
1979	Alex Higgins (NIR)	Fred Davis (ENG)	5–1	

== Castle Professional ==
The Castle Professional usually featured three professional players in a round-robin competition. Known results are shown below.

Castle Professional
Year	Winner	Runner-up	Third Place	Ref.
1972	Alex Higgins (NIR)	John Spencer (ENG)	Bernard Bennett (ENG)	
1973 (1)	John Spencer (ENG)	Alex Higgins (NIR)	Bernard Bennett (ENG)	
1973 (2)	Alex Higgins (NIR)	John Pulman (ENG)	Bernard Bennett (ENG)	
1973 (3)	Ray Reardon (WAL)	John Pulman (ENG)	Bernard Bennett (ENG)	
1974	Alex Higgins (NIR)	John Pulman (ENG)	Bernard Bennett (ENG)	
1976	John Pulman (ENG)	Patsy Fagan (IRE)	Bernard Bennett (ENG)	
1977 (1)	Doug Mountjoy (WAL)	Ray Reardon (WAL)	Bernard Bennett (ENG)	
1977 (2)	Bernard Bennett (ENG); Graham Miles (ENG)	(first place was shared)	John Pulman (ENG)	
1978	John Spencer (ENG)	Alex Higgins (NIR)		(Note: Spencer won 5-3 in the final)
