= Judd Trump =

English snooker player (born 1989)

Judd Trump MBE
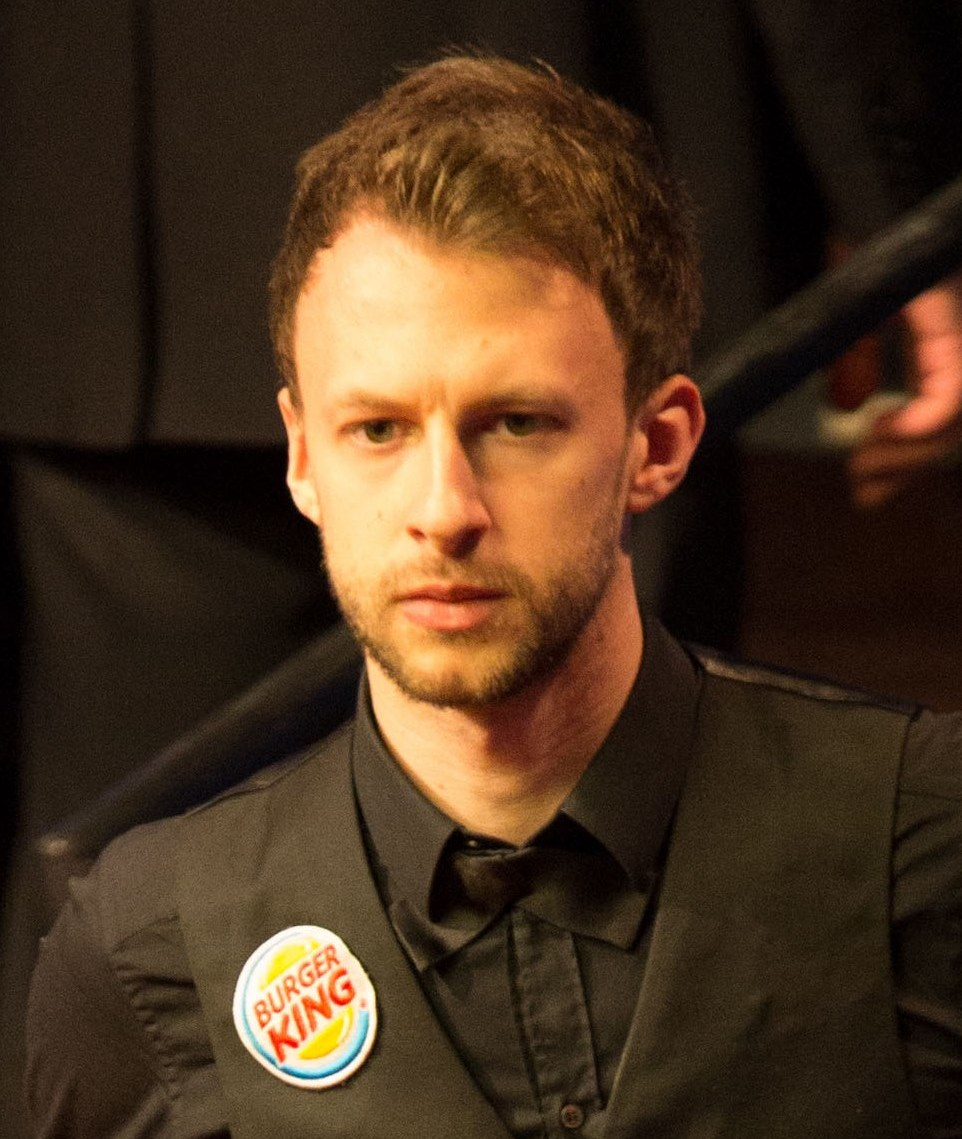
- Trump at the 2015 World Championship

Personal information
- Nickname: The Ace in the Pack
- Born: 20 August 1989 (age 37) Whitchurch, Bristol, England

Sport
- Country: England
- Sport: Snooker
- Professional: 2005–present
- Highest ranking: 1 (November–December 2012, February–March 2013, August 2019–August 2021, October–November 2021, August 2024–August 2026)
- Current ranking: 5 (as of 7 November 2026)
- Maximum breaks: 9
- Century breaks: 1,169 (as of 17 November 2026)

Tournament wins
- Ranking: 31
- Minor-ranking: 4
- World Championship: 2019

Judd Trump (born 20 August 1989) is an English professional snooker player who is a former world champion and a former world number one. He is in fourth place on the list of all-time ranking event winners, having won 31 ranking titles. He has won five Triple Crown events.

Trump turned professional in 2005, having reached the World Under-21 Championship semi-finals at age 14 the previous year. In 2011, after winning his maiden ranking title at the China Open, he was runner-up at the World Championship and captured his first Triple Crown title at the UK Championship. He finished runner-up at the 2014 UK Championship and completed his career Triple Crown in the 2018–19 season by winning both the Masters and the World Championship. In doing so, he became the first player to win over £1 million in prize money in a single season. He won six ranking events in the 2019–20 season, setting a new record for the most ranking titles earned in one season.

At the 2024 British Open, Trump made his 1,000th century break in professional competition, becoming the third player to reach this milestone, after Ronnie O'Sullivan and John Higgins. During the 2024–25 season, he won a total of £1,680,600 in prize money, setting a new record for the highest prize income in a single season. Known for his attacking style of play and break-building skills, he holds the record for the most century breaks achieved in one season, having made 107 in 2024–25, and has made nine maximum breaks in his career. He was inducted into the World Snooker Tour Hall of Fame in 2021 and has been awarded World Snooker's Player of the Year on four occasions. He was awarded an MBE in 2022 for services to snooker.

== Life and career ==
=== Early life and amateur career ===
Judd Trump was born on 20 August 1989 in Whitchurch, Bristol. He was introduced to snooker by his father, a long-distance lorry driver, who bought him a mini snooker table as a young child. Trump played his first competitive match aged six, when he needed to stand on a box to reach the table. As a child, Trump practised at Keynsham snooker club. He idolised Ronnie O'Sullivan and said in 2012: "I have wanted to be the next Ronnie O'Sullivan since I was eight." He attended Whitchurch School in Bristol, and he was the English Under-13 and Under-15 snooker champion (he won the latter at age 10). He became the youngest-ever winner of the Pontins Open in 2003 when he defeated Mike Hallett in the final. In 2004, he broke O'Sullivan's record as the youngest-ever player to score a competitive maximum break of 147, achieving the feat aged 14 years 208 days, and he reached the World Under-21 Championship semi-finals.

=== 2005–2010 ===
Trump was awarded a wild card place on the professional snooker tour for the 2005–06 season, and at the Welsh Open he became the youngest-ever player to qualify for the final stages of a ranking event. He defeated James Wattana 10–5 in the final round of qualifying at the 2007 World Championship, only the third 17-year-old player to have qualified for the main stage of the tournament, after Stephen Hendry and O'Sullivan. He played Shaun Murphy in the first round but lost 6–10 having led 6–5.

In the 2007–08 season, Trump reached the second round of the Welsh Open, where he lost 3–5 to O'Sullivan. He failed to qualify for the 2008 World Championship after a 9–10 loss to Joe Swail in the final round of qualifying, having led 9–7. At the 2008 Grand Prix, Trump reached his first ranking event quarter-final, defeating Joe Perry in the last 16. He then beat O'Sullivan 5–4 to reach the semi-finals, where he was defeated 4–6 by John Higgins. Trump won a Masters Qualifying Event in 2008 to gain entry into the 2009 Masters as the only qualifier, but he was defeated by Mark Allen in the first round. He won the 2009 Championship League, earning a place at the following season's Premier League Snooker tournament. Trump failed to reach the main stage of the 2009 World Championship, losing 8–10 to Stephen Lee in the final qualifying round, but he ended the season in the top 32 of the world rankings for the first time.

Trump did not progress beyond the last 32 in any ranking tournaments in the 2009–10 snooker season. At the non-ranking Premier League, he won four of his six matches to finish second in the league table, before losing 1–5 to O'Sullivan in the semi-finals. In 2009, Trump met Django Fung, a snooker manager and co-owner of the Grove Leisure snooker academy in Romford. Trump relocated to Romford and joined the Grove academy in January 2010. In August that year, he triumphed at the Paul Hunter Classic in Germany. Following victories over Jack Lisowski in the quarter-finals, and Murphy in the last four, he defeated Anthony Hamilton 4–3 in the final.

=== 2011–2014 ===
Trump defeated Marco Fu, Peter Ebdon and Murphy at the 2011 China Open to reach his first ranking event final, in which he triumphed over Mark Selby 10–8. During the tournament, Trump made his 100th competitive century break. At the 2011 World Championship, Trump was drawn against reigning champion Neil Robertson in the first round, with Trump winning 10–8. In subsequent rounds, he knocked out Martin Gould 13–6, Graeme Dott 13–5 and Ding Junhui 17–15 to qualify for his first World Championship final, which he lost 15–18 to Higgins. Trump had led 10–7 at the conclusion of the first day but lost six of the first eight frames the following day to fall behind. Afterwards, Higgins said he thought that Trump had been the better player in the match and had deserved to win.

Trump suffered a loss to Mark Davis in the first round of the 2011 Australian Goldfields Open, before winning a Players Tour Championship (PTC) event by beating Ding 4–0 in the final. He finished runner-up to Robertson in the eighth PTC event of the season, before capturing the ninth, overcoming O'Sullivan 4–3 in the final. He later topped the PTC Order of Merit. At the 2012 PTC Finals, he exited in the second round after a defeat to Xiao Guodong.

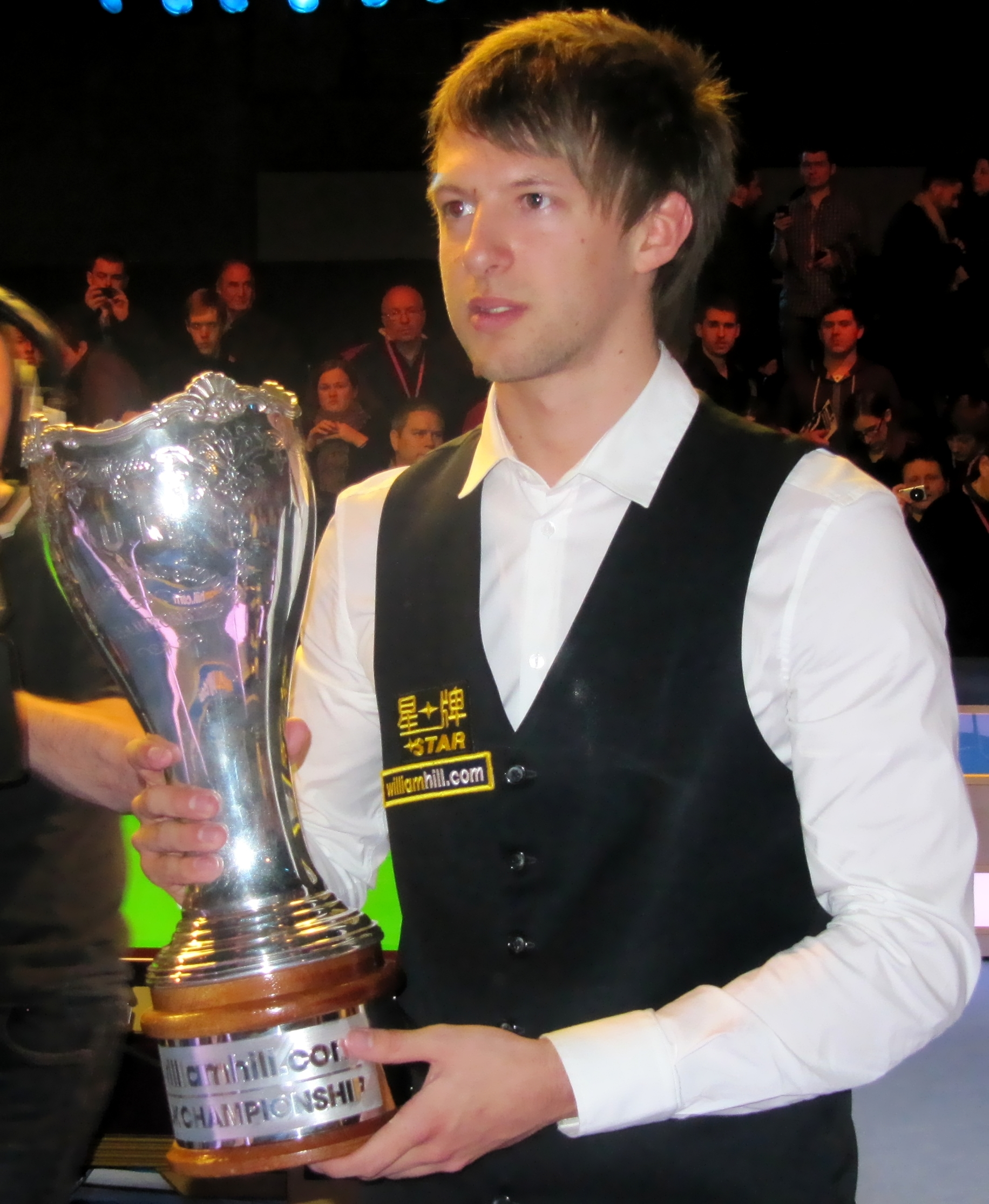
Trump defeated Mark Allen in the final of the 2011 UK Championship to claim the title.

Trump was victorious at the 2011 UK Championship at the Barbican Centre in York. He defeated Dominic Dale 6–4 in the last-32, before winning the final two frames of his second-round match to edge out O'Sullivan 6–5. Afterwards, Trump said that he had been "outplayed" and was "lucky" to have got through. He then overcame Stephen Maguire 6–3, and faced Robertson in the semi-finals. Trump stated afterwards that he believed Robertson had tried to stifle his natural game by slowing him down and "making things awkward", but the Bristolian triumphed 9–7 to reach his first UK final. There, he played Allen, and trailed 1–3, before producing a match-defining run of seven straight frames to take an 8–3 lead. Allen fought back, winning five of the next six frames to trail just 8–9, before Trump clinched the 18th frame with a break of 91, and won the match 10–8. His victory took him to number five in the world rankings. Six-time winner of the event Steve Davis said that Trump's performances during the championship had shown that he was "spearheading his generation" of snooker players.

Trump reached the semi-finals of the 2012 Masters after defeating O'Sullivan in the quarter-finals. He met Robertson in the semi-finals for the second successive major event, and it was Robertson who triumphed 6–3. He reached the final of the Championship League but lost 1–3 to Ding. At the 2012 World Championship, he defeated Dale in their first-round match 10–7, while suffering from the effects of food poisoning. He was knocked out in the second round by Ali Carter 12–13.

Trump's first tournament of the 2012–13 season was the Wuxi Classic in China, where he lost to Robert Milkins in the second round. In the semi-finals of the Shanghai Masters, he defeated Williams to reach the final against Higgins. Trump took a 5–0 lead, Higgins responded with a 147 maximum break, before Trump claimed a 7–2 advantage after the first session. Upon the resumption of play, Higgins won six frames in a row, with the match eventually going into a deciding frame, which Higgins secured to claim a 10–9 victory. Trump won his third ranking event at the International Championship. In the quarter-finals he eliminated Allen, before defeating Ebdon 9–1 in the semi-finals to become snooker's tenth world number one. He recovered from 6–8 down in the final against Robertson to triumph 10–8.

Trump met Higgins in two Players Tour Championship finals, losing the Kay Suzanne Memorial Trophy 2–4, but triumphing in the second, the Bulgarian Open, by whitewashing Higgins 4–0. He also reached the final of the 2012 Premier League after beating Robertson in the semi-finals, but lost 2–7 to Stuart Bingham. In the defence of his UK Championship title, Trump played Mark Joyce in the first round. After leading 5–2, Trump lost the last four frames of the match to exit the tournament. He also lost his position at the top of the world rankings. He exited early at both the Masters and the German Masters, but regained the world number one ranking at the Welsh Open, coming back from 1–3 down to beat Dale 4–3 in the first round, after which Trump stated that "players are changing their game to play slower against me." He progressed to the semi-finals, in which Maguire defeated him 6–4.

At the 2013 World Open, Trump played Matthew Stevens in the quarter-finals and lost 3–5. He qualified for the PTC Finals by finishing second on the Order of Merit, but lost to Alfie Burden in the first round. He also lost in the first round of the China Open to Lisowski, relinquishing the world number one ranking to Mark Selby. At the 2013 World Championship, he beat Dale in the first round 10–5. At 8–7 ahead in the last 16 against Fu, Trump won five consecutive frames to triumph 13–7 and set up a quarter-final clash with Murphy. Trump came from 3–8 down to level at 8–8 at the conclusion of the second session. The deciding frame of the match lasted 53 minutes with Trump winning it to seal a 13–12 victory. He met O'Sullivan in the semi-finals and only made five breaks above 50 in an 11–17 defeat.

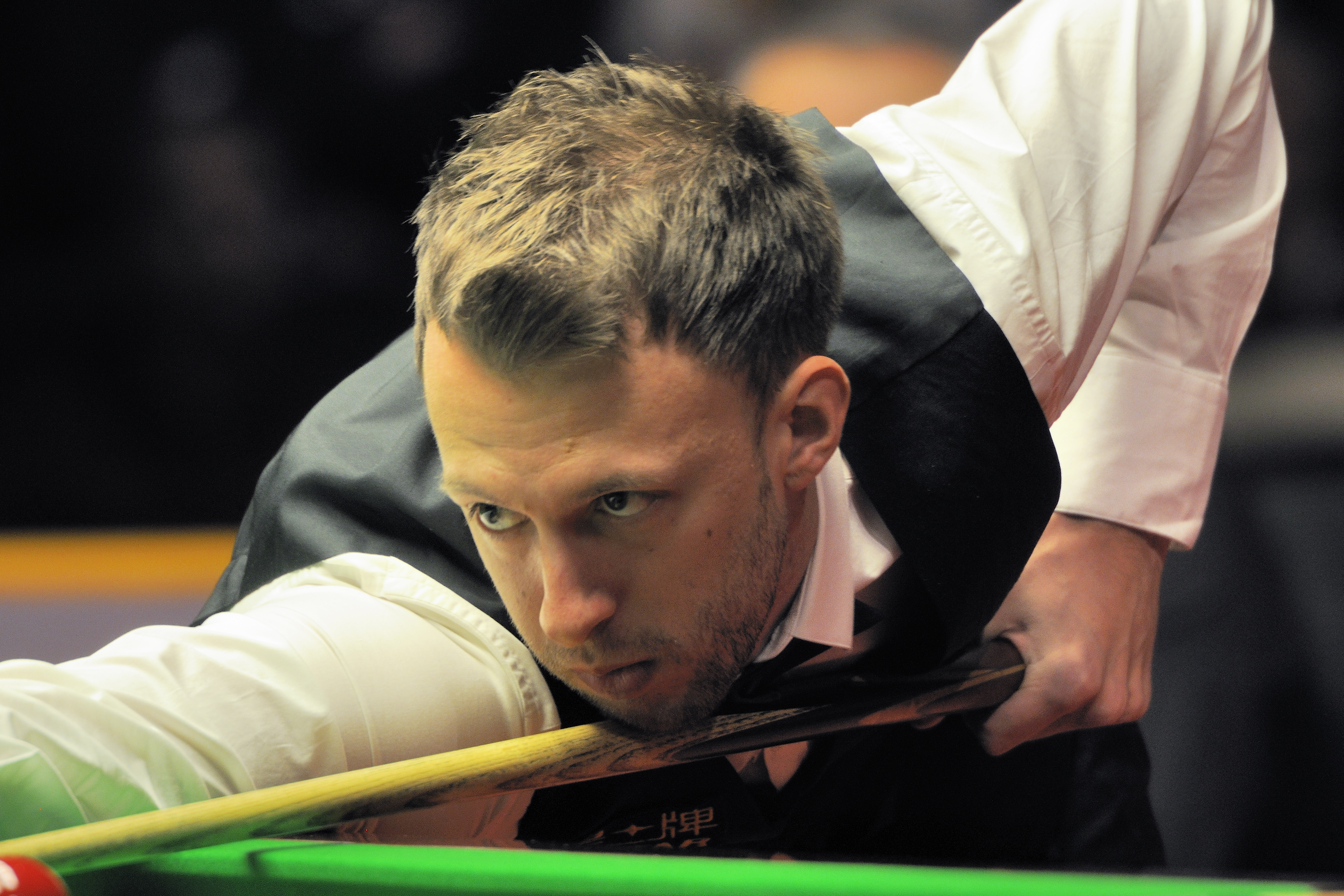
Trump at the 2014 German Masters

Trump began the 2013–14 season with first-round defeats at the Wuxi Classic, the Shanghai Masters and the International Championship, as well as failing to qualify for the Indian Open. In November, he reached the final of the minor-ranking Kay Suzanne Memorial Cup but lost 1–4 to Allen. Later that month, he made the first official maximum break of his career in the Antwerp Open during a last-32 defeat against Selby. He reached the fourth round of the 2013 UK Championship, losing to Allen, and he lost to Fu in the opening round of the 2014 Masters.

In the German Masters, Trump dropped just four frames in winning five matches to reach his first ranking final of the season, where he played Ding. The first session ended level at 4–4, before Trump lost five of the next six frames to be defeated 5–9. Higgins eliminated him in the last-16 at both the Welsh Open, and the World Open, where Higgins won 5–4 after Trump had taken a 4–0 lead. Trump won the Championship League title by beating Gould 3–1.

Trump defeated Tom Ford and Ryan Day to reach the quarter-finals of the 2014 World Championship, where he played Robertson. Trump led 6–2, 9–6 and 11–8, before Robertson fought back to win five consecutive frames and win the match 13–11. During their match, Trump chose not to acknowledge Robertson's 100th century break of the season and walked out of the arena instead. He later said that Robertson's achievement meant nothing to him and that making a maximum break of 147 was more special.

=== 2014–2017 ===
In the 2014–15 season, Trump claimed his fourth ranking title, and his first since 2012, at the Australian Goldfields Open, defeating Robertson 9–5 in the final. He also reached the final of the Paul Hunter Classic but lost 2–4 to Allen. He suffered first and second-round exits in his next two ranking events. Trump advanced to the final of the Champion of Champions, where he trailed 3–8 to O'Sullivan, before reducing his deficit to a single frame by taking four successive frames. O'Sullivan then won the two frames he needed to triumph 10–7. The pair also met in the final of the 2014 UK Championship, in which Trump was 4–9 behind. He won five consecutive frames, including back-to-back centuries to level at 9–9. In the deciding frame, O'Sullivan made a title-winning break after Trump had failed to escape from a snooker. Afterwards, O'Sullivan described the match as the "hardest" of his career.

At the 2015 Masters, Trump lost 4–6 against Maguire in the first round, but made the second 147 break of his career during his quarter-finals defeat to Selby at the German Masters. At the inaugural World Grand Prix, Trump eliminated Williams 4–3 on the final black, but fell 1–5 behind against Gould in the semi-finals. He then took five successive frames, outscoring Gould by 395 points to 37, to win the match 6–5. He played O'Sullivan in the final, and after falling 4–7 behind, Trump won six frames in a row, which included a 142 break (the highest of the tournament), to finish 10–7 and claim his second title of the season. He also reached the semi-finals of the PTC Grand Final, where he lost 2–4 to Williams. At the 2015 World Championship, Trump won his quarter-finals match against Ding 13–4, and stated afterwards, he believed that his level of play was good enough to secure a first world title. In the semi-finals, Trump trailed Bingham 14–16, before making successive centuries to force a deciding frame, which Bingham secured to triumph 17–16.

Trump's defence of his Australian Goldfields Open title ended with a defeat in the quarter-finals by Maguire. He reached the final of the Shanghai Masters, where he trailed Kyren Wilson 9–7. Trump levelled the match by winning two successive frames, but lost the decider. Trump scored 278 points without reply in taking the first three frames of his third round 2015 UK Championship match with Liang Wenbo, but eventually lost 4–6. Trump branded his performance an embarrassment and said it was probably the worst he had felt as a professional. At the 2016 Masters, Trump and Robertson set a record of six centuries in a best-of-eleven-frame match (four from Trump and two from Robertson). Trump closed it out with a 129 break to win 6–5, with Robertson describing it as "the greatest Masters match ever". Trump was then defeated 4–6 in the semi-finals by Hawkins.

His first title of the 2015–16 season came at the Championship League, where he defeated O'Sullivan 3–2 in the final. He won his fifth ranking title, and first for almost two years by beating Ricky Walden 10–4 in the China Open final. After trailing Liang Wenbo 3–7 in the first round of the 2016 World Championship, Trump tweeted that the drinks would be on him if he could turn it around. He won 10–8 and paid for drinks in a local bar. Trump could not escape from a similar position against Ding in the second round and was beaten 10–13.

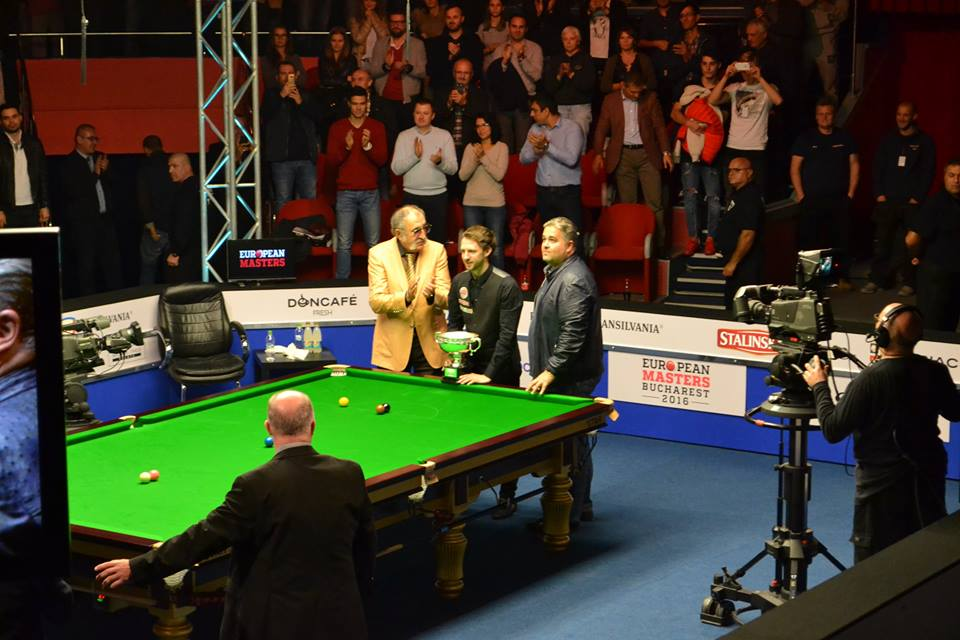
Trump after winning the 2016 European Masters

At the 2016 European Masters, Trump progressed past Higgins and Selby to reach the final. Facing O'Sullivan, Trump was down 6–8, but took the three remaining frames to triumph 9–8 and win his sixth ranking title. In the English Open, he beat Higgins in the quarter-finals and Barry Hawkins in the semi-finals to extend his winning run to 14 matches. He then lost 6–9 to Liang Wenbo in the final. Trump overcame Murphy 6–5 on the final black to reach the semi-finals of the International Championship, where he was knocked out 4–9 by Ding. He suffered a 2–6 defeat to Oliver Lines in the second round of the 2016 UK Championship. Trump was 5–1 up on Higgins in the semi-finals of the Scottish Open, but Higgins recovered to win 6–5.

In his first-round match at the 2017 Masters, Trump made two centuries and Fu three, followed by eight further breaks above 50 as Fu edged through 6–5. At the Welsh Open, Trump reached the final, where he met Bingham. Trump went 0–4 down, before recovering to lead 8–7, but then lost the last two frames and the match. Another final followed at the Gibraltar Open, where he lost 2–4 to Murphy.

Trump reached his third ranking event final inside a month at the 2017 Players Championship, where he won six consecutive frames in a row from 2–5 down to Fu, and went on to win his seventh ranking title 10–8. In the third round of the China Open, Trump made his third career 147 as he defeated Tian Pengfei 5–3, but he suffered a loss to Hossein Vafaei in the quarter-finals. Trump went into the 2017 World Championship declaring: "I honestly believe I can play to a standard which is very rare nowadays," and that he was "the best" in the world. He won the first four frames in his opening match, before Rory McLeod responded to lead 5–4. Trump was carrying a shoulder injury and eventually lost the match 8–10 to a player ranked 52 places below him in the rankings.

=== 2017–2020 ===
In the 2017–18 season, Trump successfully defended his European Masters title by defeating Bingham 9–7 in the final. The following month, he reached the final of the Shanghai Masters, where he was defeated 3–10 by O'Sullivan. He made semi-final appearances at the Scottish Open, the German Masters, and the Players Championship. In January, Trump reached the semi-finals of the 2018 Masters, but he was eliminated 5–6 by Kyren Wilson having led 5–2. At the 2018 World Championship, he secured wins against Chris Wakelin and Walden to progress to the quarter-finals, where he was defeated by Higgins in a final-frame decider.

For the 2018–19 season, Trump employed his younger brother Jack (also a former English Under-15 snooker champion) to travel with him and work with him in practice. His defence of his European Masters title ended with a defeat against Tian in the second round, but he won his first ranking title of the season at the Northern Ireland Open, beating O'Sullivan 9–7 in the final. At the 2018 UK Championship, he suffered a fourth-round loss to Perry, before reaching the semi-finals of the Scottish Open, where he was defeated by Murphy. In January, Trump won his first Masters title, beating Kyren Wilson, Selby and Robertson en route to the final, where his opponent was O'Sullivan. In the opening session, Trump took a 7–1 lead, before securing the title with a 10–4 victory. A month later, he won his second ranking event of the season, the World Grand Prix, beating Carter 10–6 in the final.

Two semi-final appearances at the Players Championship and the Tour Championship were followed by victory at the 2019 World Championship. He defeated Thepchaiya Un-Nooh 10–9 in the first round, having trailed 3–6 after the first session. In his second-round match against Ding, he led 5–1 and trailed 7–9, before winning six consecutive frames to clinch a 13–9 victory. A 13–6 quarter-final win over Maguire took him to the semi-finals, where he beat Gary Wilson 17–11 to secure his second appearance in a world final. His opponent was Higgins, in a repeat match-up of the 2011 final. Trailing 4–5 in the early stages, Trump dominated the second session, winning eight consecutive frames to lead 12–5 overnight, a display which six-time world champion Davis described as the "controlled annihilation of a great player". Trump led 16–9 going into the final session and won the opening two frames of the evening to seal an 18–9 win, and with it his first world title. The two players scored eleven centuries between them, a record for a professional match. Trump's seven centuries in the final equalled Ding's record for the most by one player in a World Championship match. Winning the world title also made Trump the 11th player to complete snooker's Triple Crown. Trump became the first player to win over £1 million in prize money during a single season and was named as the World Snooker Tour (WST) Player of the Year.

Trump won the 2019 International Championship by defeating Murphy 10–3 in the final, and he subsequently regained the number one position in the world rankings. He also won the World Open, triumphing over Un-Nooh 10–5 in the final, before reaching the final of the Champion of Champions. There, Trump led Robertson 9–8 in a best-of-19 frames match, with Robertson requiring a snooker to tie the 18th frame: Robertson got the snooker he needed and won the frame on a re-spotted black, before securing the deciding frame to defeat Trump. At the Northern Ireland Open, Trump beat O'Sullivan 9–7 to win the title, but he suffered a third-round loss to Nigel Bond at the 2019 UK Championship.

At the 2020 Masters, Trump suffered a first-round defeat to Murphy, but he was victorious at the German Masters, where he defeated Robertson 9–6 in the final. He then claimed a record-equalling fifth ranking title of the season by defeating Yan Bingtao 10–4 in the final of the Players Championship. With this victory, Trump became the fifth player to win five ranking events in a single season, after Hendry, Ding, Selby and O'Sullivan. Two weeks later, he became the first player to win six ranking titles in a single season, defeating Kyren Wilson 4–3 in the final of the Gibraltar Open.

He progressed to the semi-finals of the 2020 Tour Championship but exited the event after a 6–9 defeat to Maguire. Defending his world title at the 2020 World Snooker Championship, he supposedly fell prey to the "Crucible curse", where no first-time winner at the Crucible has ever successfully defended their world title, losing 9–13 to Kyren Wilson in the quarter-finals. In his first-round match against Ford, he made his 100th century break of the season, becoming only the second player, after Robertson, to achieve the feat. Trump was then named as WST Player of the Year.

=== 2020–2023 ===
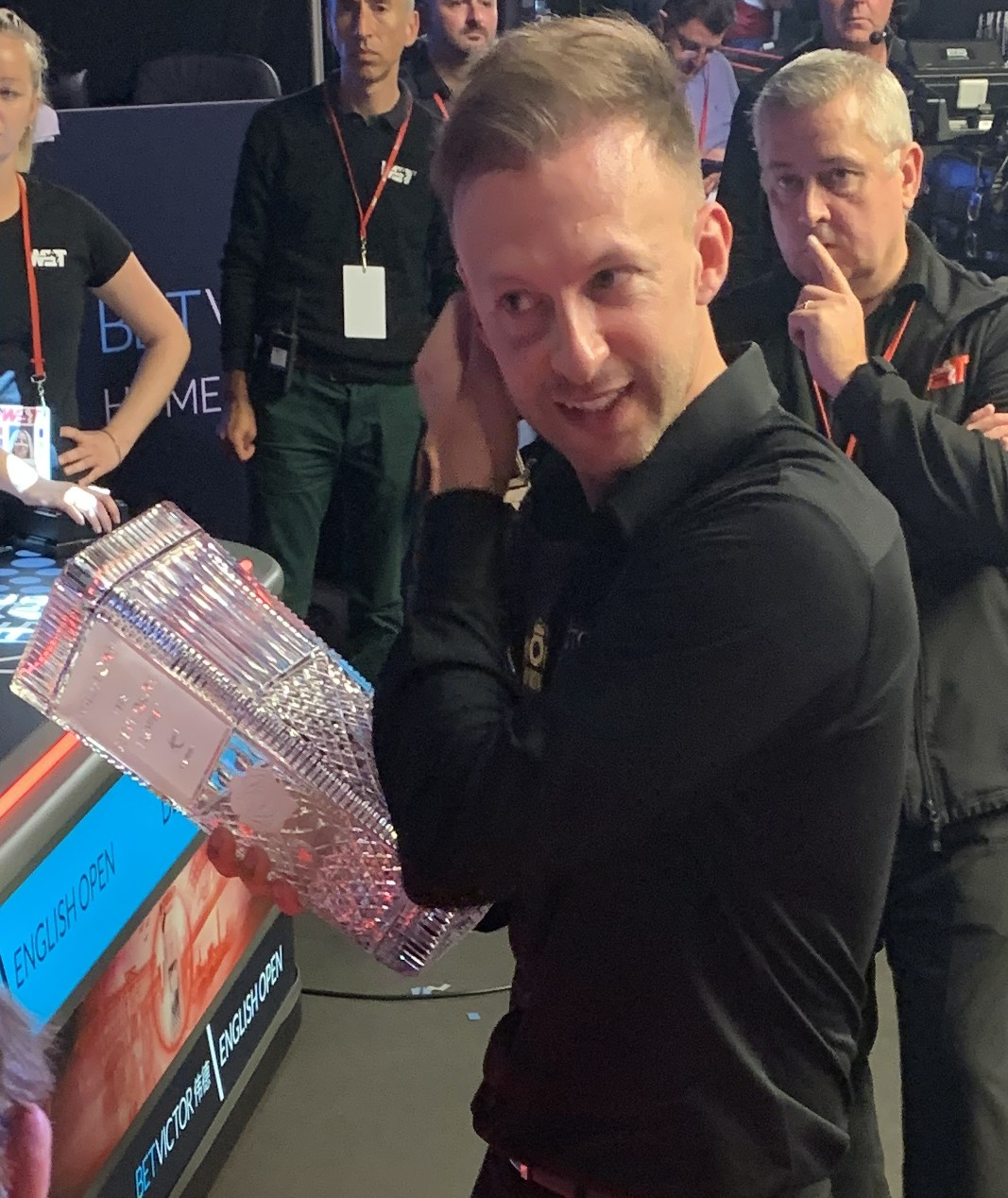
Trump won the 2023 English Open, defeating Zhang Anda in the final.

In the 2020–21 season, Trump reached the semi-finals of the European Masters, where he lost to Gould. At the English Open, he defeated Gary Wilson, Kyren Wilson and Higgins to set up a final with Robertson. The match went to a deciding frame, which Trump won with a century break, becoming the first player to win three Home Nations Series titles. Later that month, he reached the Championship League final after topping his group. He faced Kyren Wilson, who won the match 3–1, ending Trump's run of ten consecutive ranking final victories.

In November, Trump won his third consecutive Northern Ireland Open, beating O'Sullivan 9–7 in the final. His victory marked the first time that a player had won the same ranking event three years in succession since Hendry in 1996. In December, he reached the UK Championship final for the third time, defeating Liang Wenbo, Walden, Kyren Wilson and Lu Ning en route, before losing 9–10 to Robertson after missing the final pink ball in an hour-long deciding frame. At the 2020 World Grand Prix, he defeated O'Sullivan to reach the final, where he met Lisowski. Trump led 7–2, before Lisowski recovered to win four frames in a row. Trump then hit back to win the title 10–7.

In January, Trump was forced to withdraw from the 2021 Masters after testing positive for COVID-19. He returned to competition at the German Masters, where he trailed Hawkins 1–5 in the semi-finals, but recovered to win five consecutive frames, making three consecutive centuries while doing so. He went on to win the event with a 9–2 victory over Lisowski. He successfully defended his Gibraltar Open title, defeating Lisowski once more in the final 4–0, and winning 28 of the 31 frames he played in the tournament overall to claim his fifth ranking title of the season. He also secured the £150,000 European Series bonus, awarded to the player who wins the most prize money across the series, for the second consecutive season. Trump ended the snooker year with two more quarter-final appearances, at the Tour Championship and the World Championship. At the end of the season, he was named WST Player of the Year for a third time, and inducted into the WST Hall of Fame.

At the British Open, Trump was defeated in the third round by Elliot Slessor and consequently lost his position as world number one to Selby. He then entered a nine-ball pool tournament at the 2021 U.S. Open Pool Championship, which was staged in Atlantic City, New Jersey. Trump won his opening three matches before losing 1–11 to Jayson Shaw to move to the losers' side of the draw, where he exited the tournament following a 10–11 loss to Jason Theron. Trump stated his intention to continue competing in nine-ball pool, saying: "I had a lot more support from fans than I was expecting, and there were enough positives to make me do it again."

Trump defeated David Lilley, Day and Kyren Wilson to set up a final with Higgins in the Champion of Champions. He triumphed 10–4 to win the tournament for the first time. He also reached the semi-finals of the 2022 Masters, where he lost in a deciding frame to Hawkins. He reached the quarter-finals of the German Masters, before reaching the final of the Welsh Open, which he lost 5–9 to Perry. The following week, he won the 23rd ranking title of his career at the Turkish Masters in Antalya, defeating Matthew Selt 10–4 in the final while making his sixth career maximum break in the process. Trump moved from seventeenth to fourth place on the one-year rankings list, guaranteeing his place in the Tour Championship, where he exited in the quarter-finals after Brecel defeated him 10–6. Trump reached his third World Championship final after beating Williams in a final-frame decider in their semi-final contest. He lost 13–18 to O'Sullivan, having trailed 5–12 at the end of the first two sessions but closed the gap to 10–13 the following day before O'Sullivan increased his lead again. He finished the season at number two in the world rankings.

In the 2022–23 season, Trump reached the quarter-finals of the Hong Kong Masters and the European Masters. He reached the final of the Champion of Champions, where he recorded his seventh maximum break, before losing 6–10 to O'Sullivan. Trump completed his eighth maximum break in the second round of the Scottish Open against Mitchell Mann, before exiting in the quarter-finals with a defeat to Un-Nooh on a respotted black in the decider. He lost in the quarter-finals of the English Open to Luca Brecel.

Trump won his second Masters title in 2023, defeating Day, Hawkins and Bingham before triumphing over Williams 10–8 in the final. After the match, Trump stated: "This is by far my best ever win. The way I played this week is not my best, but this is my best ever performance to grind out and win this." At the World Grand Prix, he lost 9–10 to Allen in the final, fighting back to force a decider after being 2–7 down. He was also a finalist of the Championship League, losing 1–3 to Higgins, and a quarter-finalist at the 2023 Six-red World Championship. His season ended as he exited the 2023 World Championship in the first round following a 10–6 defeat by Anthony McGill.

=== 2023–2026 ===
After winning the Chinese Billiards and Snooker Association's (CBSA) Huangguoshu Open 5–1 against Higgins, Trump was a finalist at the European Masters, losing 6–9 to Hawkins, and a quarter-finalist at the Shanghai Masters, losing 1–6 to Selby. He defeated Zhang Anda 9–7 to capture the English Open, winning the final six frames of the match having trailed 3–7. The following week, he won the inaugural Wuhan Open, winning back-to-back ranking events for the fourth time in his career. He played Carter in the final and defeated him 10–7. Trump's winning streak continued at the Northern Ireland Open, claiming his fourth title there and sixth Home Nations title overall by defeating Wakelin 9–3, becoming the fifth player—after Ray Reardon, Davis, Hendry and Ding—to win three ranking tournaments in a row. His 26th ranking title also moved him above Williams into fifth place outright on the all-time list of ranking-event winners. The final was his 20th consecutive match won, but his run ended with 22 match wins, as he faced Maguire again in the last 32 at the 2023 International Championship and lost 3–6. At the Champion of Champions, he finished as runner-up after a 3–10 defeat by Allen, and in the 2023 UK Championship, he made it to the semi-finals, but lost 4–6 to Ding.

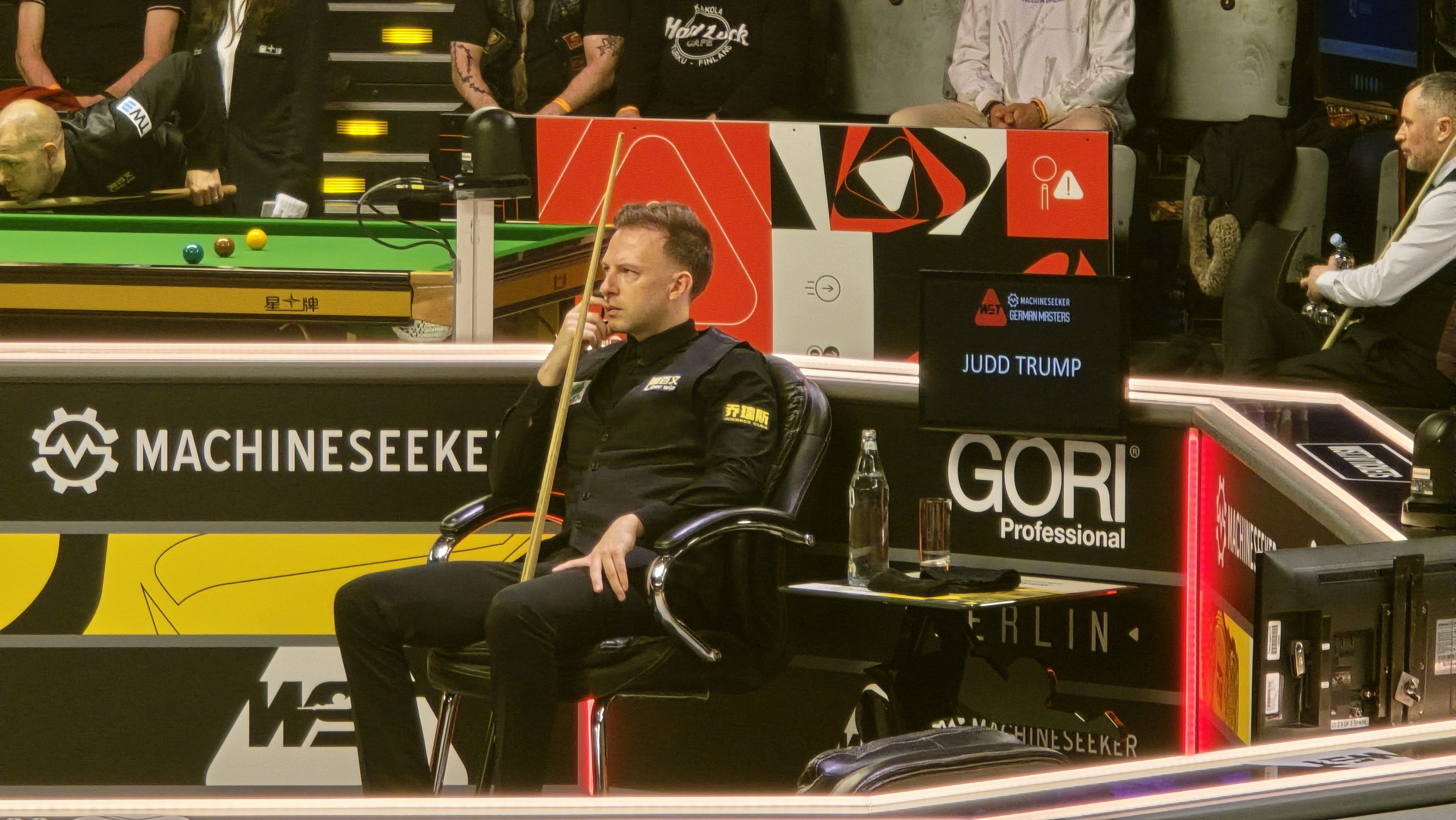
Trump at the 2025 German Masters

Trump arrived at the 2024 Masters as the defending champion but was edged out 5–6 by Carter in the quarter-finals. He was then runner-up at the next tournament, the World Grand Prix, as he lost 7–10 to O'Sullivan, after leading 4–0 and 6–3. At the German Masters, Trump claimed both the title and the European Series bonus for the third time, defeating Si Jiahui 10–5. In the 2024 World Masters of Snooker, he was a semi-finalist, but lost to O'Sullivan for the fifth time in a row. Trump was the defending champion at the World Open, and he retained the title, defeating Ding in the final 10–4. This marked the third time in his career that Trump had won at least five ranking titles and earned over £1 million in a single season. He reached the quarter-finals of both the Tour Championship (losing 4–10 to Williams) and the World Championship (beaten 9–13 by world number 44 Jak Jones).

Trump began the 2024–25 season by defeating Murphy 11–5 in the final of the Shanghai Masters. He was also a finalist at the Xi'an Grand Prix, where he lost 8–10 to Kyren Wilson; Trump subsequently regained the number one position in the world rankings. He then became the champion of the inaugural Saudi Arabia Snooker Masters and won £500,000 by beating Williams 10–9 in the final. His 29th ranking-event win moved him above Steve Davis into outright fourth place on the list of career ranking-event victories. Trump made the 1,000th century break of his career in his British Open quarter-final defeat against Allen, becoming the third player to achieve the feat following O'Sullivan and Higgins. He was runner-up to Kyren Wilson at the Northern Ireland Open, suffering a 3–9 defeat in the final. Trump beat Robertson, Higgins, Zhang and Kyren Wilson to reach the final of the 2024 UK Championship, where he beat Hawkins 10–8 to secure his second career title at the event. At the 2025 Masters, Trump was defeated in the semi-finals by Kyren Wilson 3–6, and he lost to Wilson again in the final of the Players Championship. Trump exited at the semi-finals stage of the 2025 World Championship, losing 14–17 to Williams. During his last-16 match against Murphy, Trump claimed a £100,000 bonus for completing 100 century breaks during the 2024–25 season. He finished the season with a record 107 centuries and a record £1,680,600 in prize money and was subsequently named WST Player of the Year for a fourth time.

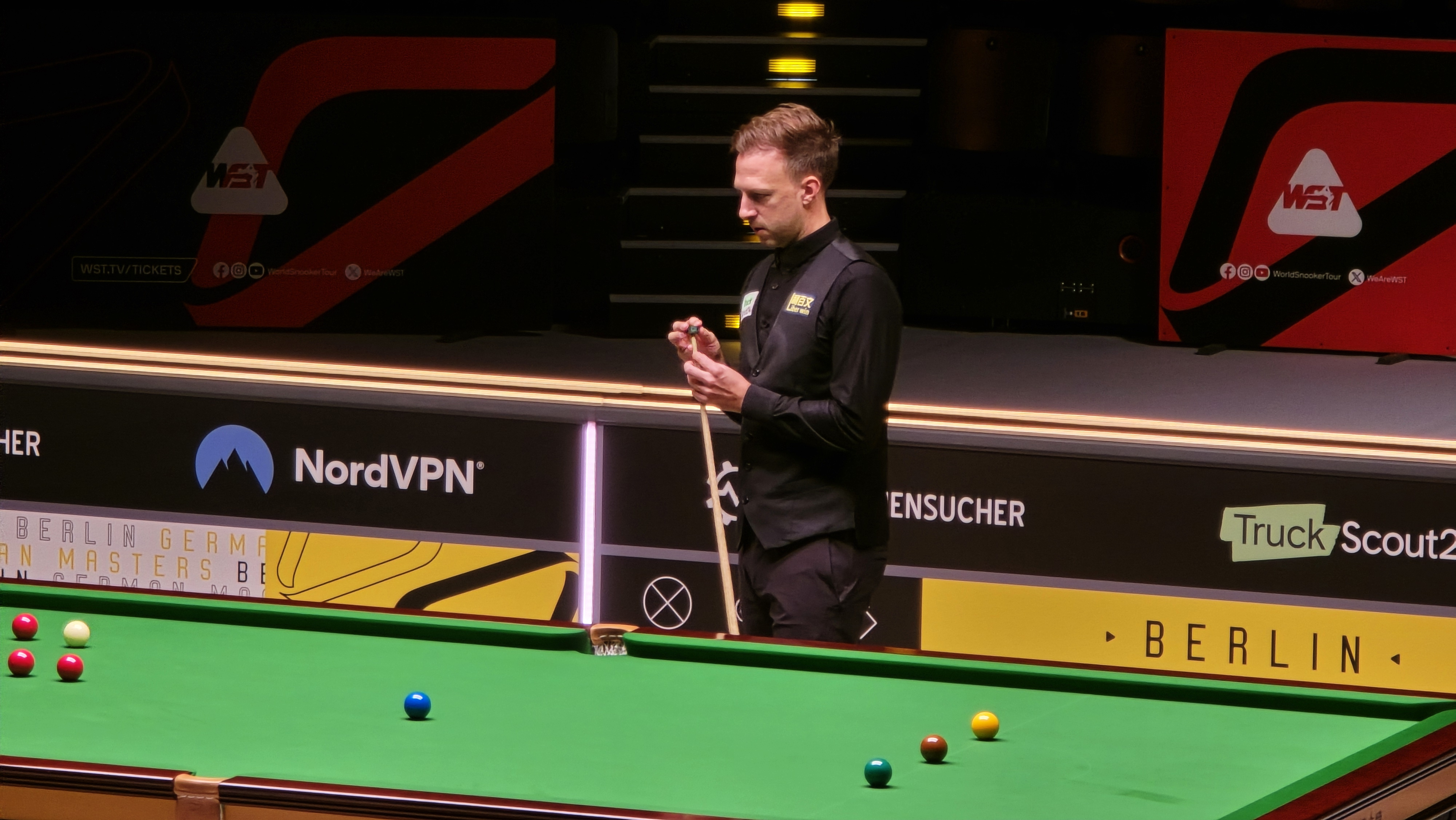
Trump during the 2026 German Masters

In October, Trump reached the final of the Northern Ireland Open, where he suffered an 8–9 defeat against Lisowski, before finishing runner-up again at the Champion of Champions, where he was beaten 5–10 by Selby. He entered the 2025 UK Championship as defending champion and progressed to the final before finishing runner-up against Selby. His 8–10 defeat meant he finished the calendar year without a trophy for the first time since 2013. At the 2026 Masters, Trump lost his semi-final match against Higgins 5–6 having led 5–3. In February, Trump won his first ranking event since November 2024 by defeating Murphy 10–4 in the final of the German Masters to win the event for a fourth time. He then exited at the semi-finals stage of both the Players Championship and the World Open. In April, Trump reached the final of the Tour Championship for the first time after overcoming Robertson in the semi-finals. He played Zhao in the final and lost 3–10. At the 2026 World Championship, Trump exited in the second round following a 12–13 defeat to Vafaei.

At the 2026 Shanghai Masters, Trump advanced to the final after defeating Wu Yize 10–6 in the semi-finals. In the final, he overcame Kyren Wilson 11–6 to win the title for the second time. Trump relinquished the number one position in the world rankings to Zhao following a quarter-finals exit to Chang Bingyu at the Wuhan Open. Jak Jones defeated him in the semi-finals of the British Open, and Wu beat him at the same stage of the Shenzhen Open.

=== Maximum and century breaks ===
Trump has completed nine maximum breaks, recording his first at the 2013 Antwerp Open against Selby. His nine maximums puts him in joint-fifth place on the all-time list of players who have made them. He has compiled more than 1,000 century breaks in professional competition, making his 1,000th in September 2024 at the British Open against Allen. He was the third player to achieve the feat, after O'Sullivan and Higgins, and reached the landmark at the age of 35. He then reached a career milestone of 1,100 centuries during his first-round match against Holt at the 2025 English Open. Trump was the second player to make 100 centuries in a single season (after Neil Robertson in 2013–14), and the first to do so on two occasions, achieving the landmark in 2019–20 and 2024–25.

=== Playing style ===
Trump is known for playing an attacking style of snooker. In 2018, the BBC described him as "flamboyant" and "effortlessly entertaining", while also recognizing that he might be considered "reckless" when his playing style causes him to miss shots. Following Trump's appearance in the final of the 2011 World Championship, O'Sullivan said of him: "Judd's greatest asset is his game terrifies people. Never seen anyone pot so well. Scary." Higgins, who defeated Trump in the 2011 World Championship final, said: "He was playing a brand of snooker I've never seen in my life. We've got a new sensation, which is great for the game." In the build-up to the 2011 UK Championship, Trump tweeted that he would play "naughty snooker"; the phrase was picked up by the press, who began using it in relation to Trump. In 2020, Eurosport named him the greatest long-potter in the history of the sport, also noting that his all-round play had improved.

== Personal life ==
Trump was once romantically linked to United Arab Emirates equestrian Khadijah Misr, who appeared with him after he won the 2017 Players Championship. He moved to Dubai in January 2024. That year, he was reported to be in a relationship with Maisy Ma, a figure skater and TV personality from Hong Kong. In late 2024, Trump gained residency of Hong Kong under the Quality Migrant Admission Scheme, with a view to splitting his time between Dubai and Hong Kong. He decided to leave Dubai during the 2026 Iran war and moved to Bangkok. He was appointed Member of the Order of the British Empire (MBE) in the 2022 Birthday Honours for services to snooker and charity.

== Performance and rankings timeline ==
| Tournaments | 2005/ 06 | 2006/ 07 | 2007/ 08 | 2008/ 09 | 2009/ 10 | 2010/ 11 | 2011/ 12 | 2012/ 13 | 2013/ 14 | 2014/ 15 | 2015/ 16 | 2016/ 17 | 2017/ 18 | 2018/ 19 | 2019/ 20 | | 2020/ 21 | 2021/ 22 | 2022/ 23 | 2023/ 24 | 2024/ 25 | 2025/ 26 | 2026/ 27 |
|---|---|---|---|---|---|---|---|---|---|---|---|---|---|---|---|---|---|---|---|---|---|---|---|
| Rankings (Note: It shows the ranking at the beginning of the season) | (Note: New players on the Main Tour do not have a ranking) | 71 | 51 | 41 | 30 | 27 | 9 | 2 | 3 | 6 | 7 | 3 | 3 | 5 | 2 | | 1 | 1 | 2 | 4 | 2 | 1 | 1 |
Ranking tournaments
| Championship League | Not Held | | Non-Ranking Event | | | | | | | | | | | | | | F | 2R | RR | 2R | A | A | A |
| China Open | LQ | LQ | LQ | WR | 1R | W | QF | 1R | 2R | 3R | W | QF | LQ | 1R | Tournament Not Held | | | | | | | | 1R |
| Wuhan Open | Tournament Not Held | | | | | | | | | | | | | | | | | | | W | SF | 3R | QF |
| British Open | Tournament Not Held | | | | | | | | | | | | | | | | | 3R | 3R | 1R | QF | 3R | SF |
| English Open | Tournament Not Held | | | | | | | | | | | F | 4R | 4R | 3R | | W | QF | QF | W | QF | 3R | QF |
| Shenzhen Open (Note: The event was called the Xi'an Grand Prix (2024/2025–2025/2026)) | Tournament Not Held | | | | | | | | | | | | | | | | | | | | F | 1R | SF |
| Northern Ireland Open | Tournament Not Held | | | | | | | | | | | WD | 1R | W | W | | W | QF | 1R | W | F | F | 1R |
| International Championship | Tournament Not Held | | | | | | | W | 1R | 2R | LQ | SF | QF | QF | W | | Not Held | | | 2R | 3R | 3R | 1R |
| UK Championship | LQ | LQ | LQ | 1R | 1R | 2R | W | 1R | 4R | F | 3R | 2R | 3R | 4R | 3R | | F | 3R | 2R | SF | W | F | |
| Shoot Out | Tournament Not Held | | | | | Non-Ranking Event | | | | | | A | A | A | A | | A | A | A | A | A | A | |
| Scottish Open | Tournament Not Held | | | | | | | MR | Not Held | | | SF | SF | SF | QF | | QF | 3R | QF | 1R | WD | A | |
| German Masters | Tournament Not Held | | | | | 1R | QF | 1R | F | QF | QF | LQ | SF | QF | W | | W | QF | LQ | W | 3R | W | |
| Welsh Open | 1R | LQ | 2R | LQ | 1R | LQ | QF | SF | 4R | 4R | 4R | F | 2R | 2R | QF | | 3R | F | 2R | WD | A | A | |
| World Grand Prix | Tournament Not Held | | | | | | | | | NR | 2R | 2R | 1R | W | 2R | | W | 2R | F | F | SF | 1R | |
| Players Championship (Note: The event was called the Players Tour Championship Grand Final (2010/2011–2015/2016)) | Tournament Not Held | | | | | 2R | 2R | 1R | SF | SF | 2R | W | SF | SF | W | | 1R | 1R | 1R | QF | F | SF | |
| World Open (Note: The event was called the Grand Prix (2005/2006–2009/2010)) | LQ | RR | LQ | SF | LQ | 1R | 2R | QF | 3R | Not Held | | 2R | LQ | 2R | W | | Not Held | | | W | 2R | SF | |
| Tour Championship | Tournament Not Held | | | | | | | | | | | | | SF | SF | | QF | QF | DNQ | QF | QF | F | |
| World Championship | LQ | 1R | LQ | LQ | LQ | F | 2R | SF | QF | SF | 2R | 1R | QF | W | QF | | QF | F | 1R | QF | SF | 2R | |
Non-ranking tournaments
| Shanghai Masters | Not Held | | Ranking Event | | | | | | | | | | | 2R | QF | | Not Held | | | QF | W | QF | W |
| Champion of Champions | Tournament Not Held | | | | | | | | QF | F | 1R | QF | 1R | QF | F | | SF | W | F | F | QF | F | 1R |
| Riyadh Season Championship (Note: The event was called the World Masters of Snooker (2023/2024)) | Tournament Not Held | | | | | | | | | | | | | | | | | | | SF | QF | SF | |
| The Masters | LQ | LQ | LQ | WR | LQ | A | SF | QF | 1R | 1R | SF | 1R | SF | W | 1R | | WD | SF | W | QF | SF | SF | |
| Championship League | Not Held | | A | W | 2R | RR | F | RR | W | RR | W | SF | RR | 2R | SF | 2R | 2R | RR | F | WD | SF | A | |
Former ranking tournaments
| Northern Ireland Trophy | NR | LQ | LQ | 1R | Tournament Not Held | | | | | | | | | | | | | | | | | | |
| Bahrain Championship | Not Held | | | 1R | Tournament Not Held | | | | | | | | | | | | | | | | | | |
| Wuxi Classic (Note: The event was called the Jiangsu Classic (2008/2009–2009/2010)) | Not Held | | | Non-Ranking Event | | | | 2R | 1R | 3R | Tournament Not Held | | | | | | | | | | | | |
| Australian Goldfields Open | Tournament Not Held | | | | | | 1R | A | A | W | QF | Tournament Not Held | | | | | | | | | | | |
| Shanghai Masters | Not Held | | LQ | 1R | LQ | 1R | 1R | F | 1R | 1R | F | 2R | F | Non-Ranking | | | Not Held | | | Non-Ranking Event | | | |
| Indian Open | Tournament Not Held | | | | | | | | LQ | 3R | NH | A | A | A | Tournament Not Held | | | | | | | | |
| Riga Masters (Note: The event was called the Riga Open (2014/2015–2015/2016)) | Tournament Not Held | | | | | | | | | Minor-Rank | | QF | A | A | A | | Tournament Not Held | | | | | | |
| China Championship | Tournament Not Held | | | | | | | | | | | NR | 2R | QF | 3R | | Tournament Not Held | | | | | | |
| WST Pro Series | Tournament Not Held | | | | | | | | | | | | | | | | 3R | Tournament Not Held | | | | | |
| Turkish Masters | Tournament Not Held | | | | | | | | | | | | | | | | | W | Tournament Not Held | | | | |
| Gibraltar Open | Tournament Not Held | | | | | | | | | | MR | F | A | A | W | | W | 4R | Tournament Not Held | | | | |
| WST Classic | Tournament Not Held | | | | | | | | | | | | | | | | | | 3R | Tournament Not Held | | | |
| European Masters (Note: The event was called the Malta Cup (2005/2006–2007/2008)) | LQ | LQ | NR | Tournament Not Held | | | | | | | | W | W | 2R | LQ | | SF | 2R | QF | F | Not Held | | |
| Saudi Arabia Masters | Tournament Not Held | | | | | | | | | | | | | | | | | | | | W | 5R | NH |
Former non-ranking tournaments
| Masters Qualifying Event | 2R | 2R | 2R | W | 2R | Tournament Not Held | | | | | | | | | | | | | | | | | |
| Power Snooker | Tournament Not Held | | | | | | 1R | Tournament Not Held | | | | | | | | | | | | | | | |
| Premier League Snooker | A | A | A | A | SF | A | SF | F | Tournament Not Held | | | | | | | | | | | | | | |
| World Grand Prix | Tournament Not Held | | | | | | | | | W | Ranking Event | | | | | | | | | | | | |
| Shoot Out | Tournament Not Held | | | | | QF | 1R | A | A | 2R | 2R | Ranking Event | | | | | | | | | | | |
| China Championship | Tournament Not Held | | | | | | | | | | | 1R | Ranking Event | | | | Tournament Not Held | | | | | | |
| Romanian Masters | Tournament Not Held | | | | | | | | | | | | QF | Tournament Not Held | | | | | | | | | |
| Hong Kong Masters | Tournament Not Held | | | | | | | | | | | | SF | Tournament Not Held | | | | | QF | Tournament Not Held | | | |
| Six-red World Championship (Note: The event was called the Six-red Snooker International (2008/2009) and the Six-red World Grand Prix (2009/2010)) | Not Held | | | A | SF | 3R | NH | SF | 3R | A | 3R | A | A | A | A | | Not Held | | QF | Tournament Not Held | | | |

Performance Table Legend
| LQ | lost in the qualifying draw | #R | lost in the early rounds of the tournament (WR = Wildcard round, RR = Round robin) | QF | lost in the quarter-finals |
| SF | lost in the semi-finals | F | lost in the final | W | won the tournament |
| DNQ | did not qualify for the tournament | A | did not participate in the tournament | WD | withdrew from the tournament |

| NH / Not Held | means an event was not held. |
| NR / Non-Ranking Event | means an event is/was no longer a ranking event. |
| R / Ranking Event | means an event is/was a ranking event. |
| MR / Minor-Ranking Event | means an event is/was a minor-ranking event. |

== Career finals ==
=== Ranking finals: 53 (31 titles) ===
Legend
World Championship (1–2)
UK Championship (2–3)
Other (28–17)

| Outcome | No. | Year | Championship | Opponent in the final | Score | Ref. |
|---|---|---|---|---|---|---|
| Winner | 1. | 2011 | China Open | Mark Selby (ENG) | 10–8 | |
| Runner-up | 1. | 2011 | World Snooker Championship | John Higgins (SCO) | 15–18 | |
| Winner | 2. | 2011 | UK Championship | Mark Allen (NIR) | 10–8 | |
| Runner-up | 2. | 2012 | Shanghai Masters | John Higgins (SCO) | 9–10 | |
| Winner | 3. | 2012 | International Championship | Neil Robertson (AUS) | 10–8 | |
| Runner-up | 3. | 2014 | German Masters | Ding Junhui (CHN) | 5–9 | |
| Winner | 4. | 2014 | Australian Goldfields Open | Neil Robertson (AUS) | 9–5 | |
| Runner-up | 4. | 2014 | UK Championship | Ronnie O'Sullivan (ENG) | 9–10 | |
| Runner-up | 5. | 2015 | Shanghai Masters (2) | Kyren Wilson (ENG) | 9–10 | |
| Winner | 5. | 2016 | China Open (2) | Ricky Walden (ENG) | 10–4 | |
| Winner | 6. | 2016 | European Masters | Ronnie O'Sullivan (ENG) | 9–8 | |
| Runner-up | 6. | 2016 | English Open | Liang Wenbo (CHN) | 6–9 | |
| Runner-up | 7. | 2017 | Welsh Open | Stuart Bingham (ENG) | 8–9 | |
| Runner-up | 8. | 2017 | Gibraltar Open | Shaun Murphy (ENG) | 2–4 | |
| Winner | 7. | 2017 | Players Championship | Marco Fu (HKG) | 10–8 | |
| Winner | 8. | 2017 | European Masters (2) | Stuart Bingham (ENG) | 9–7 | |
| Runner-up | 9. | 2017 | Shanghai Masters (3) | Ronnie O'Sullivan (ENG) | 3–10 | |
| Winner | 9. | 2018 | Northern Ireland Open | Ronnie O'Sullivan (ENG) | 9–7 | |
| Winner | 10. | 2019 | World Grand Prix (2) | Ali Carter (ENG) | 10–6 | |
| Winner | 11. | 2019 | World Snooker Championship | John Higgins (SCO) | 18–9 | |
| Winner | 12. | 2019 | International Championship (2) | Shaun Murphy (ENG) | 10–3 | |
| Winner | 13. | 2019 | World Open | Thepchaiya Un-Nooh (THA) | 10–5 | |
| Winner | 14. | 2019 | Northern Ireland Open (2) | Ronnie O'Sullivan (ENG) | 9–7 | |
| Winner | 15. | 2020 | German Masters | Neil Robertson (AUS) | 9–6 | |
| Winner | 16. | 2020 | Players Championship (2) | Yan Bingtao (CHN) | 10–4 | |
| Winner | 17. | 2020 | Gibraltar Open | Kyren Wilson (ENG) | 4–3 | |
| Winner | 18. | 2020 | English Open | Neil Robertson (AUS) | 9–8 | |
| Runner-up | 10. | 2020 | Championship League | Kyren Wilson (ENG) | 1–3 | |
| Winner | 19. | 2020 | Northern Ireland Open (3) | Ronnie O'Sullivan (ENG) | 9–7 | |
| Runner-up | 11. | 2020 | UK Championship (2) | Neil Robertson (AUS) | 9–10 | |
| Winner | 20. | 2020 | World Grand Prix (3) | Jack Lisowski (ENG) | 10–7 | |
| Winner | 21. | 2021 | German Masters (2) | Jack Lisowski (ENG) | 9–2 | |
| Winner | 22. | 2021 | Gibraltar Open (2) | Jack Lisowski (ENG) | 4–0 | |
| Runner-up | 12. | 2022 | Welsh Open (2) | Joe Perry (ENG) | 5–9 | |
| Winner | 23. | 2022 | Turkish Masters | Matthew Selt (ENG) | 10–4 | |
| Runner-up | 13. | 2022 | World Snooker Championship (2) | Ronnie O'Sullivan (ENG) | 13–18 | |
| Runner-up | 14. | 2023 | World Grand Prix | Mark Allen (NIR) | 9–10 | |
| Runner-up | 15. | 2023 | European Masters | Barry Hawkins (ENG) | 6–9 | |
| Winner | 24. | 2023 | English Open (2) | Zhang Anda (CHN) | 9–7 | |
| Winner | 25. | 2023 | Wuhan Open | Ali Carter (ENG) | 10–7 | |
| Winner | 26. | 2023 | Northern Ireland Open (4) | Chris Wakelin (ENG) | 9–3 | |
| Runner-up | 16. | 2024 | World Grand Prix (2) | Ronnie O'Sullivan (ENG) | 7–10 | |
| Winner | 27. | 2024 | German Masters (3) | Si Jiahui (CHN) | 10–5 | |
| Winner | 28. | 2024 | World Open (2) | Ding Junhui (CHN) | 10–4 | |
| Runner-up | 17. | 2024 | Xi'an Grand Prix | Kyren Wilson (ENG) | 8–10 | |
| Winner | 29. | 2024 | Saudi Arabia Snooker Masters | Mark Williams (WAL) | 10–9 | |
| Runner-up | 18. | 2024 | Northern Ireland Open | Kyren Wilson (ENG) | 3–9 | |
| Winner | 30. | 2024 | UK Championship (2) | Barry Hawkins (ENG) | 10–8 | |
| Runner-up | 19. | 2025 | Players Championship | Kyren Wilson (ENG) | 9–10 | |
| Runner-up | 20. | 2025 | Northern Ireland Open (2) | Jack Lisowski (ENG) | 8–9 | |
| Runner-up | 21. | 2025 | UK Championship (3) | Mark Selby (ENG) | 8–10 | |
| Winner | 31. | 2026 | German Masters (4) | Shaun Murphy (ENG) | 10–4 | |
| Runner-up | 22. | 2026 | Tour Championship | Zhao Xintong (CHN) | 3–10 | |

=== Minor-ranking finals: 8 (4 titles) ===
| Outcome | No. | Year | Championship | Opponent in the final | Score | Ref. |
|---|---|---|---|---|---|---|
| Winner | 1. | 2010 | Paul Hunter Classic | Anthony Hamilton (ENG) | 4–3 | |
| Winner | 2. | 2011 | Players Tour Championship – Event 2 | Ding Junhui (CHN) | 4–0 | |
| Runner-up | 1. | 2011 | Alex Higgins International Trophy | Neil Robertson (AUS) | 1–4 | |
| Winner | 3. | 2011 | Antwerp Open | Ronnie O'Sullivan (ENG) | 4–3 | |
| Runner-up | 2. | 2012 | Kay Suzanne Memorial Trophy | John Higgins (SCO) | 2–4 | |
| Winner | 4. | 2012 | Bulgarian Open | John Higgins (SCO) | 4–0 | |
| Runner-up | 3. | 2013 | Kay Suzanne Memorial Cup (2) | Mark Allen (NIR) | 1–4 | |
| Runner-up | 4. | 2014 | Paul Hunter Classic | Mark Allen (NIR) | 2–4 | |

=== Non-ranking finals: 18 (10 titles) ===
Legend
The Masters (2–0)
Champion of Champions (1–5)
Premier League (0–1)
Other (7–2)

| Outcome | No. | Year | Championship | Opponent in the final | Score | Ref. |
|---|---|---|---|---|---|---|
| Winner | 1. | 2009 | Championship League | Mark Selby (ENG) | 3–2 | |
| Runner-up | 1. | 2012 | Championship League | Ding Junhui (CHN) | 1–3 | |
| Runner-up | 2. | 2012 | Premier League | Stuart Bingham (ENG) | 2–7 | |
| Winner | 2. | 2014 | Championship League (2) | Martin Gould (ENG) | 3–1 | |
| Runner-up | 3. | 2014 | Champion of Champions | Ronnie O'Sullivan (ENG) | 7–10 | |
| Winner | 3. | 2015 | World Grand Prix | Ronnie O'Sullivan (ENG) | 10–7 | |
| Winner | 4. | 2016 | Championship League (3) | Ronnie O'Sullivan (ENG) | 3–2 | |
| Winner | 5. | 2019 | The Masters | Ronnie O'Sullivan (ENG) | 10–4 | |
| Runner-up | 4. | 2019 | Champion of Champions (2) | Neil Robertson (AUS) | 9–10 | |
| Winner | 6. | 2021 | Champion of Champions | John Higgins (SCO) | 10–4 | |
| Runner-up | 5. | 2022 | Champion of Champions (3) | Ronnie O'Sullivan (ENG) | 6–10 | |
| Winner | 7. | 2023 | The Masters (2) | Mark Williams (WAL) | 10–8 | |
| Runner-up | 6. | 2023 | Championship League Invitational (2) | John Higgins (SCO) | 1–3 | |
| Winner | 8. | 2023 | Huangguoshu Open | John Higgins (SCO) | 5–1 | |
| Runner-up | 7. | 2023 | Champion of Champions (4) | Mark Allen (NIR) | 3–10 | |
| Winner | 9. | 2024 | Shanghai Masters | Shaun Murphy (ENG) | 11–5 | |
| Runner-up | 8. | 2025 | Champion of Champions (5) | Mark Selby (ENG) | 5–10 | |
| Winner | 10. | 2026 | Shanghai Masters (2) | Kyren Wilson (ENG) | 11–6 | |

=== Team finals: 1 ===
| Outcome | No. | Year | Championship | Team | Opponent in the final | Score | Ref. |
|---|---|---|---|---|---|---|---|
| Runner-up | 1. | 2017 | World Cup | England | China A | 3–4 | |

=== Pro-am finals: 8 (5 titles) ===
| Outcome | No. | Year | Championship | Opponent in the final | Score | Ref. |
|---|---|---|---|---|---|---|
| Winner | 1. | 2003 | Pontins Spring Open | Mike Hallett (ENG) | 4–2 | |
| Winner | 2. | 2006 | Pontins Pro-Am – Event 2 | Ryan Day (WAL) | 4–1 | |
| Winner | 3. | 2006 | Pontins Pro-Am – Event 3 | Michael Holt (ENG) | 4–1 | |
| Runner-up | 1. | 2007 | Pontins Pro-Am – Event 6 | Dave Harold (ENG) | 3–4 | |
| Runner-up | 2. | 2008 | Pontins Pro-Am – Event 1 | Stuart Bingham (ENG) | 3–4 | |
| Runner-up | 3. | 2008 | Pontins Pro-Am – Event 3 | Peter Lines (ENG) | 3–4 | |
| Winner | 4. | 2009 | Pontins Pro-Am – Event 3 (2) | Peter Lines (ENG) | 5–2 | |
| Winner | 5. | 2010 | Austrian Open | Neil Robertson (AUS) | 6–4 | |

=== Amateur finals: 10 (7 titles) ===
| Outcome | No. | Year | Championship | Opponent in the final | Score | Ref. |
|---|---|---|---|---|---|---|
| Winner | 1. | 2000 | English Under-15 Championship | James Croxton (ENG) | 5–3 | |
| Runner-up | 1. | 2000 | English Under-13 Championship | Lee Page (ENG) | 1–4 | |
| Runner-up | 2. | 2001 | English Under-18 Championship | Tom Ford (ENG) | 1–5 | |
| Winner | 2. | 2002 | English Under-13 Championship | Stuart Carrington (ENG) | 5–0 | |
| Runner-up | 3. | 2002 | English Under-15 Championship | Ben Woollaston (ENG) | 1–5 | |
| Winner | 3. | 2003 | English Under-15 Championship (2) | Thomas Ainsworth-Smith (ENG) | 5–1 | |
| Winner | 4. | 2004 | English Open | Craig Steadman (ENG) | 8–7 | |
| Winner | 5. | 2004 | English Under-15 Championship (3) | Stuart Carrington (ENG) | 5–0 | |
| Winner | 6. | 2005 | English Under-15 Championship (4) | Stuart Carrington (ENG) | 5–2 | |
| Winner | 7. | 2005 | English Under-18 Championship | Gyles Behbood (ENG) | 8–4 | |
