= English Amateur Billiards Championship =

Annual billiards tournament

The English Amateur Billiards Championship, organised by the English Amateur Billiards Association (EABA), is an annual tournament in the game of billiards dating back to March 1888.

In the first championship, Hugh Lonsdale of Manchester defeated Joseph Tither of Harpurhey by 500–356 in the final, played on the evening of 28 March 1888 at Orme's Rooms in Manchester.

Norman Dagley of Earl Shilton, Leicestershire, holds the record for the most Championship wins with 15, achieved between 1975 and 1984. He also has the record break, 862, and the highest match average with 147.7 which was achieved in the 1984 final against Bob Close of Hartlepool.

The current and nine-time champion is Rob Hall, of Norton Disney, Lincolnshire. Hall defeated John Mullane of Hampshire in the 2025 final 2131–259, which was held for the 25th successive contest at the Whitworth Institute, Darley Dale, Derbyshire. Hall averaged 107 in the four--hour final with top breaks of 526, 381 and 339.

Year	Winner	Runner- up	Score
2025	Rob Hall	John Mullane	2131-259
2024	Rob Hall	Allan Scott	1335-847
2023	Peter Sheehan	Chris Taylor	1096-829
2022	Martin Goodwill	Mark Hatton	797-225
2021	COVID		
2020	COVID		
2019	Rob Hall	Darren Kell	1174-666
2018	Rob Hall	Darren Kell	1531-657
2017	Rob Hall	Phil Mumford	1289-1010
2016	Rob Hall	Phil Welham	1480-813
2015	Rob Hall	Phil Mumford	1051-882
2014	Rob Hall	Phil Mumford	1425-769
2013	Mathew Sutton	Darren Kell	1143-637
2012	Rob Hall	Billy Bousfield	1094-991
2011	Mathew Sutton	Rob Hall	1196-534
2010	Matthew Sutton	Martin Goodwill	838 - 719
2009	Martin Goodwill	John Murphy	1,025 - 836
2008	Martin Goodwill	Robert Hall	1,463 - 561
2007	Matthew Sutton	Martin Goodwill	1,001 - 587
2006	Martin Goodwill	Matthew Sutton	1,055 - 618
2005	Phillip Welham	Peter Shelley	1,421 - 854
2004	Matthew Sutton	Phil Mumford	971 - 637
2003	Tony James	Matthew Sutton	899 - 694
2002	Lee Lagan	Stephen Crosland	1,445 - 1102
2001	Lee Lagan	Darren Kell	1,536 - 864
2000	Phillip Welham	Peter Shelley	1,157 - 930
1999	Lee Lagan	Phillip Welham	1,658 - 963
1998	Paul Bennett	Neal Rewhorn	1,312 - 696
1997	Paul Bennett	Terry Ward	1,013 - 897
1996	Chris Shutt	Terry Ward	1,609 - 938
1995	David Causier	Chris Shutt	1,783 - 1,568
1994	Peter Sheehan	Brian Harvey	2,019 - 1,631
1994	Martin Goodwill	David Causier	1,227 - 1,105
1993	David Causier	Martin Goodwill	1,179 - 1,028
1992	David Causier	Dennis Watson	3,259 - 2,072
1991	Martin Goodwill	Stephen Crosland	2,357 - 1,380
1990	Martin Goodwill	Peter Shelley	2,371 - 1,337
1989	David Edwards	Peter Shelley	2,791 - 2,345
1988	Peter Gilchrist	Dave Edwards	3,379 - 1,954
1987	Dave Edwards	Peter Gilchrist	2,427 - 2,224
1986	Ken Shirley	Mike Russell	3 - 1
1985	Bob Close	Ken Shirley	2,493 - 2060
1984	Norman Dagley	Bob Close	3,412 - 1,757
1983	Norman Dagley	Bob Close	3,503 - 1,586
1982	Norman Dagley	Bob Close	4,208 - 2,169
1981	Norman Dagley	Bob Close	3,805 - 2,190
1980	Norman Dagley	Clive Everton	2,825 - 2,172
1979	Norman Dagley	Ken Shirley	3,311 - 1,549
1978	Norman Dagley	Bob Close	4,611 - 2,309
1977	Bob Close	Herbert Beetham	2,951 - 2,031
1976	Bob Close	Clive Everton	2,413 - 2,194
1975	Norman Dagley	Bob Close	2,917 - 2,693
1974	Norman Dagley	Alf Nolan	2,961 - 2,677
1973	Norman Dagley	Clive Everton	2,804 - 1,976
1972	Norman Dagley	Alf Nolan	3,115 - 2,469
1971	Norman Dagley	W. J. Dennison	3,672 - 2,019
1970	Norman Dagley	Alf Nolan	4,467 - 2,372
1969	Jack Karnehm	Mark Wildman	3,722 - 2,881
1968	Mark Wildman	Clive Everton	2,652 - 2,540
1967	Leslie Driffield	Clive Everton	3,395 - 2,328
1966	Norman Dagley	Alf Nolan	3,018 - 2,555
1965	Norman Dagley	Alf Nolan	2,983 - 2,757
1964	Alf Nolan	Leslie Driffield	3,455 - 2,188
1963	Herbert Beetham	Norman Dagley	4,052 - 2,759
1962	Leslie Driffield	Herbert Beetham	3,412 - 2,993
1961	Herbert Beetham	Reg Wright	4,060 - 2,043
1960	Herbert Beetham	Reg Wright	3,426 - 2,289
1959	Leslie Driffield	Herbert Beetham	4,968 - 3,385
1958	Leslie Driffield	Jack Wright	4,483 - 2,587
1957	Leslie Driffield	Frank Edwards	4,464 - 2,894
1956	Frank Edwards	Leslie Driffield	3,395 - 3,327
1955	Frank Edwards	Alf Nolan	4,194 - 3,206
1954	Leslie Driffield	Frank Edwards	4,165 - 3,030
1953	Leslie Driffield	Frank Edwards	4,136 - 3,016
1952	Leslie Driffield	Herbert Beetham	2,894 - 2,793
1951	Frank Edwards	Joe Tregoning	5,015 - 3,791
1950	Frank Edwards	Joe Tregoning	4,968 - 3,385
1949	Frank Edwards	Joe Tregoning	4,813 - 3,297
1948	Joe Thompson	Harold Terry	5,202 - 2,816
1947	Joe Thompson	Arthur Hibbert	4,104 - 3,185
1946	Mendel Showman	Herbert Beetham	3,077 - 2,539
1941-45	No contests.		
1940	Kingsley Kennerley	Arthur Spencer	3,931 - 3,749
1939	Kingsley Kennerley	Arthur Spencer	4,423 - 3,264
1938	Kingsley Kennerley	Joe Thompson	4,714 - 3,925
1937	Kingsley Kennerley	Joe Thompson	4,703 - 3,633
1936	Joe Thompson	Herbert Beetham	3,179 - 3,149
1935	Horace Coles	Maurice Boggin	3,707 - 3,272
1934	Sydney Lee	Frank Edwards	3,929 - 3,509
1933	Sydney Lee	Horace Coles	4,458 - 3,237
1932	Sydney Lee	Frank Edwards	4,674 - 3,508
1931	Sydney Lee	Maurice Boggin	3,793 - 3,134
1930	Laurie Steeples	Horace Coles	3,000 - 2,462
1929	Horace Coles	Sydney Lee	3,000 - 2,215
1928 Feb	Arthur Wardle	Albert Good	3,000 - 2,189
1927 Feb	Laurie Steeples	Horace Coles	3,000 - 2,449
1926 Mar	Joe Earlam	Cecil M. Helyer	3,000 - 1,751
1925	Sydney Fry	Willie Marshall	3,000 - 2,778
1924 Mar	William McLeod	J. Graham-Symes	3,000 - 2,862
1923	William McLeod	J. Graham-Symes	3,000 - 2,867
1922	J. Graham-Symes	William McLeod	3,000 - 2,661
1921 Feb	Sidney Fry	J. Graham-Symes	3,000 - 2,591
1920	Sidney Fry	Willie Marshall	3,000 - 2,488
1919	Sidney Fry	J. Graham-Symes	2,000 - 1,729
1918	J. Graham-Symes	'Osbourne'	2,000 - 1,121
1917	J. Graham-Symes	Sydney Fry	2,000 - 1,540
1916	Sydney Fry	Geo. Heginbottom	2,000 - 1,417
1915	Albert Good	Geo. Heginbottom	2,000 - 1,444
1914 Feb	Harry Virr	Jack Nugent	3,000 - 1,962
1913 Mar	Harry Virr	Jack Nugent	3,000 - 1,956
1912 Mar	Harry Virr	Major Fleming	3,000 - 2,993
1911 Mar	Harry Virr	Major Fleming	3,000 - 2,716
1910	H. A. 0. Lonsdale	Major Fleming	2,000 - 1,882
1909 May	H. L. Fleming	Harry Virr	2,000 - 1,501
1908 Mar	Harry Virr	Geo. Heginbottom	2,000 - 1,841
1907 Mar	Harry Virr	Jack Nugent	2,000 - 1,986
1906 Mar	Ernest Breed	Albert Good	2,000 - 1,620
1905 Mar	Albert Good	Geo. Heginbottom	2,000 - 1,739
1904 Mar	Walter Lovejoy	Albert Good	2,000 - 1,733
1903 Dec	Sam Christey	Charles V. Diehl	2,000 - 1,314
1903 Mar	Arthur Wisdom	Albert Good	2,000 - 1,783
1902 Oct	Albert Good	A. J. Browne	2,000 - 1,669
1902 Feb	Albert Good	Sam Christey	2,000 - 1,689
1901 Feb	Sam Christey	W. S. Jones	1,500 - 1,305
1900 Mar	Sidney Fry	Arthur Wisdom	1,500 - 1,428
1899 Mar	Arthur Wisdom	Sidney Fry	1,500 - 1,297
1896 Mar	S. H. Fry	W. T. Maughan	1,500 - 1,430
1894 Dec	W. T. Maughan	H. Mitchell	1,500 - 1,202
1894 May	H. Mitchell	A. Vinson	1500 - 1464
1893 Mar	Sidney Fry	Arthur Wisdom	1500 - 1239
1893 Feb	Arthur Wisdom	Mr. Buxton	1,500 - 852
1893 Jan	A. H. Vahid	Sam Christey	1500 - 1395
1892 May	Sam Christey	Sidney Fry	1,500 - 928
1892 Mar	Arthur Wisdom	Osbourne	1500 - 1094
1891 Apr	A. P. Gaskell	W. D. Courtney	1500 - 1188
1891 Jan	W. D. Courtney	A. P. Gaskell	1,500 - 971
1890 Oct	W. D. Courtney	A. P. Gaskell	1500 - 1141
1890 May	A. P. Gaskell	N. Defries	1,500 - 805
1890 Jan	A. P. Gaskell	S. H. Fry	1500 - 1395
1889 Jul	A. P. Gaskell	E. W. Alabone	1500 - 1278
1889 Mar	A. P. Gaskell	(declared Champion)	
1888 Dec	A. P. Gaskell	H. A. 0. Lonsdale	1,500 - 1349
1888 Mar	H. A. 0. Lonsdale	W. D. Courtney	500 - 334
