= Ian Williamson =

English former professional snooker and English billiards player

Personal information
- Born: 1 December 1958 (age 67)

Sport
- Country: England
- Sport: Snooker
- Professional: 1982–1996
- Highest ranking: 47

Ian Williamson (born 1 December 1958) is an English former professional snooker and English billiards player.

== Biography ==
Ian Williamson was born on 1 December 1958. His father was Jim Williamson, founding proprietor of the Northern Snooker Centre in Leeds.

Williamson was runner up in the English Under 19 English billiards Championships in 1975 and 1976. He lost the 1975 final to Eugene Hughes and the 1976 final to Steve Davis. In 1976, he beat Davis in the semi-final of the Under-19 Snooker championship before losing to him later the same day in the billiards final. Williamson won the Under-19 billiards title in 1977 and 1978, beating John Barnes in the final both years. He was also a semi-finalist in the 1978 English Amateur Championship, beaten 8–4 by Joe Johnson

His application to become a professional snooker player in 1980 was refused, along with that of Eugene Hughes, whilst Tony Knowles was the only one of three applicants at the time to be accepted. The following year, Williamson lost 7–5 to Bill Oliver in the final of the 1981 Pontins Autumn Open.

Williamson became a professional player in 1982 but never reached the quarter-finals of a major tournament. He reached the last 16 of the 1984 Grand Prix where he was beaten 5–2 by Tony Knowles.

He was more successful as a billiards player, winning the 1988 UK Championship. The final was played as best-of-13 150-up, and it took Williamson nine hours to beat Robby Foldvari 7–3 in a match where both players were warned by the referee for slow play. and was runner up 7–5 to Norman Dagley at the 1991 British Open. In a 2005 article, former billiards world champion Geet Sethi described Williamson as "justifiably accused as one of the slowest players on the circuit."

Williamson and Robby Foldvari set a record for the longest best-of-nine frame snooker match when they took seven hours and fourteen minutes to finish their match in the seventh qualifying round of the 1994 British Open in August 1993. The match included two consecutive 80-minute-long frames.

Williamson's first inclusion on the professional snooker ranking list saw him listed at 47th, in the Snooker world rankings 1985/1986. He then dropped in the rankings each year and last competed on the professional snooker circuit in the 1995-96 season, when he was ranked 283rd, before going on to focus on coaching. He qualified as a coach with the World Professional Billiards and Snooker Association in 2015. In the Billiards world rankings, Williamson was ranked third in both 1989/90 and 1990/91.
