= Chris Shutt =

English world champion billiards player

Sport
- Country: England
- Sport: Snooker

Tournament wins
- World Championship: 2005

Chris Shutt is an English champion player of English billiards. He won the World Professional Billiards Championship in 2005.

== Biography ==
Shutt started playing billiards as a child, after he broke his leg whilst playing football. He found he had an aptitude for billiards, and won a number of junior tournaments. At the age of 18, he turned professional, although still working as a car salesperson in Northallerton. At the age of 14, he won silver in the 800 metres at the national junior athletics championships.

He won the English Under-16 billiards title in 1993, the under 19 title in 1995 and 1996, and the English Amateur Championship in 1996, having been runner-up in 1995. His 1996 victory, at the age of 18, made him the youngest winner of the English Amateur Championship, which had been running since 1888, and he turned professional directly after the win.

The 2000 International Billiards and Snooker Federation World Open Championship was played on a "50-up" basis, with players needing to win the designated number of games played as the first to 50 points. Although Shutt professed to dislike the format, he won the title, qualifying second from his group behind Devendra Joshi. He beat Ashok Shadliya 8–4 in the last 16, Peter Gilchrist 9–6 in the quarter final and Paul Bennett 10–2 in the semi-final. In the final he was level at 5–5 Roxton Chapman before drawing ahead to 10–7 and winning the match 11–9.

At the 2005 WPBSA World Professional Billiards Championship, Shutt emerged top of his qualifying group, with wins over David Causier, Devendra Joshi, and Clive Everton. He then recorded wins over Steve Mifsud in the quarter-final, and Causier in the semi-final, to play Mike Russell for the title. Shutt won the four-hour final 1,620 to 1,365 to gain the professional title.

Shutt was runner-up in the world championship in 2007, losing the final 1,710–2,166 to Russell.

== Titles and achievements ==
- 1996 English Amateur Billiards Champion
- 2000 IBSF World Open Billiards Champion
- 2005 World Professional Billiards Champion
- 2007 World Professional Billiards Championship runner-up
