= Norman Dagley =

English billiards player (1930–1999)

Personal information
- Born: 1930 Earl Shilton, Leicestershire
- Died: 15 January 1999 (aged 68)

Sport
- Country: England
- Sport: Snooker
- Professional: 1985–1999
- Highest ranking: 1

Tournament wins
- World Championship: 1971, 1976 (Amateur); 1987, 1988 (Professional)

Norman Dagley (1930 – 15 January 1999) was an English billiards player. He won both the world amateur and world professional titles twice. Dagley was also English amateur champion a record fifteen times.

== Early career and English Amateur Championship titles ==
Dagley learned to play billiards from two brothers who were good amateur players, Reg and Jack Wright, in his home village of Earl Shilton. He served in the Korean War whilst on National Service, and once spent a night in a group on a dinghy after the American transport plane that they were on had to ditch. He said that this experience of not knowing what the dawn would bring gave him a perspective on the game: "After that, you don't get worked up over a game of billiards."

He was runner-up in the English Amateur Billiards championship in 1963, and from 1964 won the title fifteen times in twenty-one attempts, never again losing in the final. He set many records, including a world and English championship record break of 862 and session average of 116.6 in 1978. In the 1984 final, his average was 147.7. He also enjoyed success in the CIU championships, another major tournament in England, winning the title 11 times between 1964 and 1981.

== IBSF World Amateur Championship ==
Dagley won the IBSF World Billiards Championship in 1971, defeating Mannie Francisco in the final, and again in 1975, with Michael Ferreira as runner-up. He received a cigarette box from the Mayor of Hinckley to commemorate the second of his world championship wins. He was also runner-up in 1979 to Paul Mifsud and in 1981 to Michael Ferreira.

He did not turn professional until the age of 54, and even as a professional, retained his job as the manager of a snooker club in the town of Nuneaton.

== Professional career ==
In his first attempt at the World Professional Championship, when the matches were played as the best of five games of 400-up, he proceeded to the 1985 final without losing a game, with 3–0 wins over Jack Fitzmaurice, Jack Karnehm and Robby Foldvari. Dagley finished as runner up to Ray Edmonds 3–1, with most games being close. The game scores (Edmonds first) were 400–395, 307–400, 400–315 and 400–386.

The following year, 1986, he beat both Bernard Bennett and Eddie Charlton 3–0, before dropping his first game of the championship in a 3–1 defeat of the previous year's winner Ray Edmonds. In the final, he won the first game against Robby Foldvari but then lost the next three and the match.

In 1987, he defeated Robert Close 3–0, Ian Williamson 3–1, and Mark Wildman 3–0 to set up a rematch of the previous years final against Foldvari. This time it was Dagley who lost the first game before going in to win the next three, and the title. Winning the 1987 professional championship meant that Dagley had completed a unique set of titles over his career – English Amateur Champion, World Amateur champion, UK Professional Champion, and World Professional Champion. He won £9,500, then the largest prize ever seen in billiards, for the world championship, and with his other successes that season, including the UK and European titles, pocketed almost £20,000 of the nearly £50,000 total prize money on the circuit that season.

Dagley retained the title in 1988. With wins over Mike Russell 4–0, H. Griffiths 4–1 and Ian Williamson 4–1. He then defeated Australian veteran Eddie Charlton 7–4 in the final.

Aged 61 in 1991, he won the British Open trophy at the Barbican Centre. It was held there as part of the celebrations to mark the bicentenary of the death of the composer Mozart, who was a keen player of billiards.

He was married, to Nita. Dagley died in 1998 after suffering severe influenza. He is commemorated with a blue plaque in Earl Shilton, and there is also a street called Norman Dagley Close in the town.

== Career highlights ==
- English Amateur billiards champion 1965, 1966, 1970, 1971, 1972, 1973, 1974, 1975, 1978, 1979, 1980, 1981, 1982, 1982, 1984
- CIU Champion 1964, 1966, 1970, 1972, 1975, 1976, 1977, 1978, 1979, 1980, 1981
- 1971 IBSF World Billiards Champion
- 1975 IBSF World Billiards Champion
- 1979 IBSF World Billiards Championship runner-up
- 1981 IBSF World Billiards Championship runner-up
- 1985 World Professional Billiards Championship runner-up
- 1986 World Professional Billiards Championship runner-up
- 1987 World Matchplay Champion
- 1987 European Billiards Champion
- 1987 UK Billiards Champion
- 1987 World Professional Billiards Champion
- 1988 World Professional Billiards Champion
- 1991 British Open Billiards Champion
