= 2015 IBSF World Snooker Championship =

- Date: 9 – 21 November
- Edition: 41st
- Category: Amateur Event
- Prize money: $40,000
- Location: Hurghada, Egypt
- Venue: Grand Crystal Bay

Champions

Men's singles
- (India) Pankaj Advani

Women's singles
- (Belgium) Wendy Jans
- IBSF World Snooker Championship

The 2015 IBSF World Snooker Championship was an amateur snooker tournament which took place from 9 November to 21 November 2015 in Hurghada, Egypt.

It will be the 41st edition of the IBSF World Snooker Championship and also doubles as a qualification event for the World Snooker Tour.

The men's tournament was won by Pankaj Advani of India who won his second IBSF World Snooker Championship, defeating 2013 runner-up Zhao Xintong 8–6 in the final.

Wendy Jans won the women's tournament by defeating Anastasia Nechaeva 5–1 in the final. This victory was Jans fourth consecutive tournament win and her fifth overall.

== Tournament ==
The tournament was an event run by the International Billiards and Snooker Federation (IBSF). The event was originally due to take place in Sharm el-Sheikh, however due to the Metrojet Flight 9268 crash the tournament was relocated to Hurghada. Because of this many competitors withdrew from the competition amid safety fears and this ended up leaving some of the groups featuring as little as four players who would subsequently all qualify for the knockout stage of the tournament regardless of their results in the group stage. The men's event also doubled as a qualification event for the World Snooker Tour.

== Singles players ==
2015 IBSF World Snooker Championship – Men's

Champion		Runner-Up	
(India) Pankaj Advani [6]		(China) Zhao Xintong [4]	
Semifinals out
(Wales) Ben Jones [40]		(Germany) Lukas Kleckers [63]	
Quarterfinals out
(Thailand) Kritsanut Lertsattayathorn [1]	(Malta) Brian Cini [28]	(Malta) Alex Borg [19]	(Republic of Ireland) Greg Casey [55]
4th round out
(Pakistan) Muhammad Asif [16]	(Qatar) Mohsen Bukshaisha [24]	(Belgium) Tomasz Skalski [21]	(Hong Kong) Lin Tang Ho [45]
(Iran) Soheil Vahedi [3]	(Scotland) Gary Thomson [75]	(United Arab Emirates) Mohamed Shehab [7]	(Syria) Karam Fatima [18]
3rd round out
(Wales) Jamie Clarke [33]	(Scotland) Michael Collumb [17]	(Hong Kong) Lee Chun Wai [9]	(Iraq) Alijalil Ali [57]
(China) Yuan Sijun [5]	(Qatar) Bashar Abdulmajeed [76]	(Republic of Ireland) Rodney Goggins [13]	(Bahrain) Ahmed Janahi [36]
(England) Michael Rhodes [35]	(Egypt) Yaser Elsherbiny [78]	(India) Dharminder Lilly [22]	(Iran) Amir Sarkhosh [27]
(India) Faisal Khan [26]	(Thailand) Issara Kachaiwong [23]	(Malaysia) Keen Hoo Moh [15]	(Malaysia) Mohd Reza Hassan [34]
2nd round out
(Egypt) Khaled Farag [65]	(England) Saqib Nasir [32]	(United Arab Emirates) Khalid Kamali [48]	(Wales) Alex Taubman [49]
(Finland) Antti Mannila [56]	(South Africa) Richard Halliday [41]	(Wales) Rhydian Richards [25]	(Pakistan) Muhammad Sajjad [8]
(Isle of Man) John Kennish [60]	(India) Varun Madan [37]	(Singapore) Lim Chun Kiat [85]	(Netherlands) Raymon Fabrie [12]
(Australia) Adrian Ridley [52]	(Qatar) Ahmed Saif [20]	(Qatar) Ali Alobaidli [29]	(Egypt) Mohamed Khairy [68]
(England) Ryan Causton [62]	(Afghanistan) Nadir Khan Sultani [30]	(Malta) Aaron Busuttil [46]	(Egypt) Basem Eltahhan [14]
(Saudi Arabia) Ahmed Aseeri [11]	(Finland) Antti Tolvanen [86]	(Afghanistan) Mohammad Rais Senzahi [38]	(Belgium) Peter Bullen [70]
(Egypt) Karim Elabd [58]	(Malaysia) Kok Leong Lim [39]	(Saudi Arabia) Omar Alajlani [87]	(Japan) Tetsuya Kuwata [10]
(Australia) Ryan Thomerson [50]	(Bahrain) Habib Subah [47]	(Australia) Shannon Dixon [31]	(Pakistan) Abdul Sattar [2]
1st round out
(Egypt) Mostafa Dorgham [64]	(Austria) Jérôme Liedtke [81]	(Egypt) Mohamed Hemdan [80]	(Egypt) Hesham Shawky [73]
(South Africa) Abdul Mutalieb Allie [88]	(Japan) Keishin Kamihashi [72]	(Iraq) Ali Hussein [69]	(Australia) James Mifsud [45]
(Iran) Saeed Abooyesani [53]	(Egypt) Mohamed Ibrahim [77]	(Palestine) Khaled Alastal [84]	(Egypt) Mohamed Youssef [61]
(Egypt) Tamer Waheed [67]	(Egypt) Abdelrahman Abdelhamid [83]	(Singapore) Ang Boon Chin [51]	(Austria) Dominik Scherübl [54]
(Republic of Ireland) David Cassidy [43]	(Egypt) Tymour Hussien [59]	(United States) Ahmed Aly Elsayed [71]	(Pakistan) Shahram Changezi [42]
(Egypt) Mostafa Gebely [74]	(Egypt) Ahmed Samir [79]	(Egypt) Alaa Elsaed [82]	(Hong Kong) Chau Hon Man [66]

2015 IBSF World Snooker Championship – Women's

Champion		Runner-Up	
(Belgium) Wendy Jans [10]		(Russia) Anastasia Nechaeva [5]	
Semifinals out
(India) Amee Kamani [1]		(Thailand) Waratthanun Sukritthanes [3]	
Quarterfinals out
(India) Chitra Magimairaj [9]	(Thailand) Siripaporn Nuanthakhamjan [4]	(Hong Kong) Ng On Yee [6]	(India) Vidya Pillai [2]
4th round out
(South Africa) Amy Claire King [16]	(Latvia) Tatjana Vasiljeva [8]	(Australia) Jessica Woods [12]	(Australia) Theresa Whitten [20]
(India) Arantxa Sanchis [14]	(Russia) Daria Sirotina [11]	(Germany) Diana Stateczny [7]	(Germany) Jennifer Zehentner [18]
3rd round out
(Australia) Kathy Howden [17]	(India) Sunita Khandelwal [24]	(Bahrain) Nahla Sunni [21]	(India) Varsha Sanjeev [13]
(Australia) Anna Lynch [19]	(France) Angélique Vialard [22]	(South Africa) Joy Lyn Willenberg [23]	(South Africa) Nicola Illse Rossouw [15]

== Seedings ==
=== Men's event ===
Seed	Player	Frames Won	Frames Lost	Frames Difference	Frame Average	Status
1	(Thailand) Kritsanut Lertsattayathorn	15	1	15	3.75	Quarterfinals lost to (Wales) Ben Jones [40]
2	(Pakistan) Abdul Sattar	12	1	11	3.67	Second round lost to (Germany) Lukas Kleckers [63]
3	(Iran) Soheil Vahedi	20	2	18	3.60	Fourth round lost to (Malta) Alex Borg [19]
4	(China) Zhao Xintong	16	2	14	3.50	Runner-up, lost to (India) Pankaj Advani [6]
5	(China) Yuan Sijun	20	3	17	3.40	Third round loss to (Malta) Brian Cini
6	(India) Pankaj Advani	20	4	16	3.20	Champion, won against (China) Zhao Xintong [4]
7	(United Arab Emirates) Mohamed Shehab	20	4	16	3.20	Fourth round lost to (Republic of Ireland) Greg Casey [55]
8	(Pakistan) Muhammad Sajjad	20	4	16	3.20	Fourth round lost to (Iraq) Alijalil Ali [57]
9	(Hong Kong) Lee Chun Wai	20	4	16	3.20	Quarterfinals lost to (Qatar) Mohsen Bukshaisha [24]
10	(Japan) Tetsuya Kuwata	20	5	15	3.00	Second round lost to (Republic of Ireland) Greg Casey [55]
11	(Saudi Arabia) Ahmed Aseeri	20	6	14	2.80	Second round lost to (Scotland) Gary Thomson [75]
12	(Netherlands) Raymon Fabrie	20	6	14	2.80	Second round lost to (Qatar) Bashar Abdulmajeed [76]
13	(Republic of Ireland) Rodney Goggins	20	7	13	2.60	Third round lost to (Hong Kong) Lin Tang Ho [45]
14	(Egypt) Basem Eltahhan	20	7	13	2.60	Second round lost to (Egypt) Yaser Elsherbiny [78]
15	(Malaysia) Keen Hoo Moh	16	6	10	2.50	Third round lost to (Syria) Karam Fatima [18]
16	(Pakistan) Muhammad Asif	20	8	12	2.40	Fourth round lost to (Thailand) Kritsanut Lertsattayathorn [1]
17	(Scotland) Michael Collumb	16	7	9	2.25	Third round lost to (Pakistan) Muhammad Asif [16]
18	(Syria) Karam Fatima	20	9	11	2.20	Fourth round lost to (France) Lukas Kleckers [63]
19	(Malta) Alex Borg	18	11	7	2.20	Quarterfinals lost to (India) Pankaj Advani [6]
20	(Qatar) Ahmed Saif	18	8	10	2.00	Second round lost to (Hong Kong) Lin Tang Ho [45]
21	(Belgium) Tomasz Skalski	18	11	7	1.40	Fourth round lost to (Malta) Brian Cini [28]
22	(India) Dharminder Lilly	18	11	7	1.40	Third round lost to (Scotland) Gary Thomson [75]
23	(Thailand) Issara Kachaiwong	18	5	13	2.60	Third round lost to (Republic of Ireland) Greg Casey [55]
24	(Qatar) Mohsen Bukshaisha	17	7	10	2.00	Fourth round lost to (Wales) Ben Jones [40]
25	(Wales) Rhydian Richards	14	6	8	2.00	Second round lost to (Wales) Ben Jones [40]
26	(India) Faisal Khan	19	9	10	2.00	Third round lost to (United Arab Emirates) Mohamed Shehab [7]
27	(Iran) Amir Sarkhosh	19	9	10	2.00	Third round lost to (India) Pankaj Advani [6]
28	(Malta) Brian Cini	18	8	10	2.00	Quarterfinals lost to (China) Zhao Xintong [4]
29	(Qatar) Ali Alobaidli	19	10	9	1.80	Second round lost to (Bahrain) Ahmed Janahi [36]
30	(Afghanistan) Nadir Khan Sultani	19	10	9	1.80	Second round lost to (England) Michael Rhodes [35]
31	(Australia) Shannon Dixon	19	11	8	1.60	Second round lost to (Malaysia) Mohd Reza Hassan [34]
32	(England) Saqib Nasir	19	12	7	1.40	Second round lost to (Wales) Jamie Clarke [33]
33	(Wales) Jamie Clarke	17	11	6	1.20	Third round lost to (Thailand) Kritsanut Lertsattayathorn [1]

=== Women's event ===
Seed	Player	Frames Won	Frames Lost	Frames Difference	Frame Average	Status
1	(India) Amee Kamani	12	0	12	3.00	Semifinals lost to (Russia) Anastasia Nechaeva [5]
2	(India) Vidya Pillai	12	1	11	2.75	Quarterfinals lost to (Belgium) Wendy Jans [10]
3	(Thailand) Waratthanun Sukritthanes	12	1	11	2.75	Semifinals lost to (Belgium) Wendy Jans [10]
4	(Thailand) Siripaporn Nuanthakhamjan	12	2	10	2.50	Quarterfinals lost to (Russia) Anastasia Nechaeva [5]
5	(Russia) Anastasia Nechaeva	15	4	11	2.20	Runner-up, lost to (Belgium) Wendy Jans [10]
6	(Hong Kong) Ng On Yee	14	5	9	1.80	Quarterfinals lost to (Thailand) Waratthanun Sukritthanes [3]
7	(Germany) Diana Stateczny	13	5	8	1.60	Second round lost to (Belgium) Wendy Jans [10]
8	(Latvia) Tatjana Vasiljeva	13	6	7	1.40	Second round lost to (India) Chitra Magimairaj [9]
9	(India) Chitra Magimairaj	10	5	5	1.25	Quarterfinals lost to (India) Amee Kamani [1]
10	(Belgium) Wendy Jans	9	3	6	1.50	Champion, won against (Russia) Anastasia Nechaeva [5]
11	(Germany) Daria Sirotina	9	4	5	1.25	Second round lost to (Belgium) Wendy Jans [10]
12	(Australia) Jessica Woods	9	6	3	0.75	Second round lost to (Russia) Anastasia Nechaeva [5]
13	(India) Varsha Sanjeev	12	7	5	1.00	First round lost to (Australia) Theresa Whitten [20]
14	(India) Arantxa Sanchis	12	8	4	0.80	Second round lost to (Thailand) Waratthanun Sukritthanes [3]
15	(South Africa) Nicola Illse Rossouw	9	6	3	0.75	First round lost to (Germany) Jennifer Zehentner [18]
16	(South Africa) Amy-Claire King	8	9	–1	–0.25	Second round lost to (India) Amee Kamani [1]
