= 2003 World Women's Snooker Championship =

Embassy Women's World Snooker Championship
Tournament information
- Venue: Crucible Theatre (Final stages)
- City: Sheffield
- Country: United Kingdom
- Organisation: World Ladies Billiards and Snooker Association
- Format: Single elimination
- Winner's share: £5,500
- Highest break: 125 (Kelly Fisher)

Final
- Champion: (England) Kelly Fisher
- Runner-up: (England) Lisa Quick
- Score: 4–1

The 2003 Women's World Snooker Championship was a women's snooker tournament played in the United Kingdom in 2003. Defending champion Kelly Fisher beat Lisa Quick 4–1 in the final to win the title.

== Tournament summary ==
Defending champion Fisher took a lead of 3–0 in the final at the Crucible Theatre, with breaks of 32, 45 and 90. Quick won the fourth frame on the black before Fisher won the fifth to take the match 4–1 and win the world championship for the fifth time in six years.

The highest break of the tournament was 125, by Fisher during qualifying. Quick made a break of 115.

== Prize money ==
- Winner (Kelly Fisher): £5,500
- Runner-up (Lisa Quick): £2,750
- Semi-final losers: £1,500
- Quarter-final losers: £600
- Losers in the last 16: £200
- Losers in the last 32: £100

== Main draw ==
Source: Snooker Scene

Last 32; Best-of-7 frames
(England) Kelly Fisher	4
(England) Rebecca Corfield	0
(England) Caroline Walch	4
(Republic of Ireland) Anne McMahon	2
(Wales) Sharon Dickson	4
(India) R Umadevi Nagaraj	0
(Republic of Ireland) Margaret Campion]	4
(England) Gaye Jones	0
(England) Reanne Evans	4
(England) Sarah Clarke	2
(England) June Banks	4
(England) Tina Owen-Sevilton	1
(Norway) Anita Rizzuti	4
(Wales) Laura Evans	2
(England) Maria Catalano	4
(Republic of Ireland) Martina Lumsden	1
(Belgium) Cathy Dehaene	4
(England) Lisa Ingall	3
(France) Angelique Vialard	4
(Scotland) Valerie Finnie	1
(England) Emma Bonney	4
(England) Mandy Fisher	0
(Belgium) Wendy Jans	4
(Wales) Laura Pearce	0
(England) Lisa Quick	4
(Belgium) Candide Binon	0
(England) Michelle Brown	4
(England) Jenny Poulter	2
(Belgium) Isabelle Jonckheere	w.o.
(England) Debbie Reynolds	scr.
(Scotland) Lynette Horsburgh	4
(England) Marianne Lazarides	0

Last 16; Best-of-7 frames
(England) Kelly Fisher	4
(England) Caroline Walch	1
(Wales) Sharon Dickson	4
(Republic of Ireland) Margaret Campion	1
(England) Reanne Evans	4
(England) June Banks	1
(Norway) Anita Rizzuti	0
(England) Maria Catalano	4
(Belgium) Cathy Dehaene	4
(France) Angelique Vialard	2
(England) Emma Bonney	2
(Belgium) Wendy Jans	4
(England) Lisa Quick	4
(England) Michelle Brown	1
(Belgium) Isabelle Jonckheere	2
(Scotland) Lynette Horsburgh	4

Quarter-finals; Best-of-7 frames
(England) Kelly Fisher	4
(Wales) Sharon Dickson	1
(England) Reanne Evans	4
(England) Maria Catalano	3
(Belgium) Cathy Dehaene	1
(Belgium) Wendy Jans	4
(England) Lisa Quick	4
(Scotland) Lynette Horsburgh	1

Semi-finals; Best-of-7 frames
(England) Kelly Fisher	4
(England) Reanne Evans	0
(Belgium) Wendy Jans	2
(England) Lisa Quick	4

Final; Best-of-7 frames
(England) Kelly Fisher	4
(England) Lisa Quick	1

== Final ==
Source: Snooker Scene

Final: Best-of-7 frames. Crucible Theatre, Sheffield
Kelly Fisher (England)	4–1		Lisa Quick (England)		
Frame	1	2	3	4	5
Kelly Fisher; 30+ Breaks	51; 32	65; 45	99; 90	58 -	62 -
Lisa Quick; 30+ Breaks	13 -	9 -	24 -	63 -	38; 34
Frames won (Fisher first)	1–0	2–0	3–0	3–1	4–1
90	Highest break		34		
1	50+ breaks		0		
2	30+ breaks		1		
Kelly Fisher wins the 2003 World Women's Snooker Championship
