= Yana Shut =

Belarusian snooker and pool player

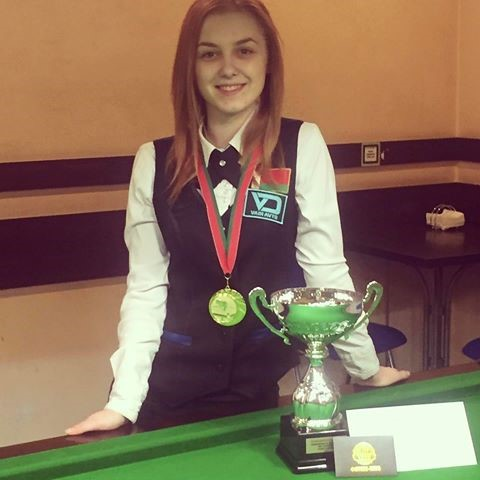

Personal information
- Born: 29 July 1997 (age 29) Minsk, Belarus

Sport
- Country: Belarus
- Sport: Snooker

Yana Shut (born 29 July 1997 in Minsk, Belarus) is a Belarusian amateur snooker and professional pool player. She is the first IBSF Under-18 World Snooker Champion and also WLBSA World Snooker Mixed Doubles Champion. In 2018 she became European Champion in 10-Ball.

== Career ==
Yana Shut started her career in 2005 at pool tournament in Belarus and won her first tournament in 2006, when she was only 9 years old. In 2012 Yana was representing her country at European Youth Pool Championship.

In 2013 Yana started to play snooker and in June 2013 she competed in the 2013 EBSA European Snooker Championships but lost in the quarter-final round to eventually winner Wendy Jans. The following year, Yana played in the WLBSA Ladies World Under-21 Championship where she would go on to face defending champion Hannah Jones in a thrilling final. Jones however was successful retaining the championship, defeating Yana Shut 3–1. In 2014 Yana Shut played and won WLBSA World Snooker Mixed Doubles Championship in team with professional player Ben Woollaston. In October 2015, Yana Shut entered the 2015 IBSF World Under-18 Snooker Championship as the number four seed, she advanced to the final where she defeated Anastasija Singurindi 3–0 to win the inaugural championship.

In 2017 Yana Shut competed in the 2017 EBSA European Snooker Championships but lost in semi-final round to Anna Prysazhnuka 4–2. In this year Yana played the 2017 EBSA European Team Snooker Championships where in team with Albina Liashchuk they lost in semi-final to team Belgium. In 2018 she reached the semi-final in the EBSA European Snooker Championships and lost to Cathy Dehaene.

Yana Shut has also competed in the men's EBSA European Under-21 Championships on several occasions playing against the likes of Jamie Clarke, Duane Jones, Rhys Clark and Kacper Filipiak.

In 2018 Yana Shut won the women's 10-Ball division of the European Pool Championships by beating Jasmin Ouschan 6–2 in final.

== Tournament wins ==
=== Medals: : 13 (3 title) ===
Outcome	No.	Year	Championship	Opponent	Score
Winner	1.	2018	European Pool Championships – 10-Ball	(Austria) Jasmin Ouschan	6–2
Semi-finalist	2.	2018	EBSA European Ladies Snooker Championship	(Belgium) Cathy Dehaene	2–4
Semi-finalist	3.	2017	EBSA European Ladies Snooker Championship	(Latvia) Anna Prysazhnuka	2–4
Semi-finalist	4.	2017	EBSA European Team Ladies Snooker Championship	(Belgium) Wendy Jans & Cathy Dehaene	1–3
Semi-finalist	5.	2016	WLBSA World Under-21 Championship	(India) Varshaa Sanjeev	1–2
Semi-finalist	6.	2016	EBSA European Team Ladies Snooker Championship	(Latvia) Tatjana Vasiljeva & Prysazhnuka	1–3
Winner	7.	2015	IBSF World Under-18 Championship	(Russia) Anastasija Singurindi	3–0
Runner-up	8.	2015	WLBSA World Under-21 Championship	(England) Jasmine Bolsover	2–3
Semi-finalist	9.	2015	Ireland Ladies Snooker Championship	(England) Emma Bonney	0–3
Semi-finalist	10.	2015	WLBSA Eden Masters	(Wales) Laura Evans	2–4
Runner-up	11.	2014	WLBSA World Under-21 Championship	(Wales) Hannah Jones	1–3
Winner	12.	2014	WLBSA World Snooker Mixed Doubles Championship	(Belgium) (Wales) Wendy Jans & Jamie Clarke	3–0
Runner-up	13.	2014	EBSA European Team Ladies Snooker Championship	(Russia) Anastasia Nechaeva & Daria Sirotina	1–4
