= Caty Dehaene =

Belgian snooker player

Personal information
- Born: 11 December 1965 (age 60)

Sport
- Country: Belgium
- Sport: Snooker

Caty Dehaene (born 11 December 1965) is a Belgian snooker player. She was runner-up in the 2018 Women's EBSA European Snooker Championship.

== Playing career ==
Caty Dehaene was runner-up in the Belgian Women's snooker Championship in 1995, 2005, 2006, 2012, 2013, 2014, 2016 and 2019.

Dehaene and Wendy Jans won the Ladies European Team Snooker Championship in 2017, beating Anastasia Nechaeva and Daria Sirotina 4–3 in the final.

At the 2018 EBSA European Snooker Championship, Dehaene reached the women's final, with wins of 3–0 against Ewilina Pislewska, 4–1 against Tatjana Vasiljeva and 4–2 against Yana Shut. In the final she lost 0–4 to Jans, who won the title for the sixth year in a row.

== Career highlights ==
=== Individual ===
Outcome	No.	Year	Championship	Opponent	Score	Ref.
Runner-up		1995	BBSA Belgian Championship (Women's')	Christel Leclercq	2–3	
Runner-up		1999	EBSA Continental Cup	Wendy Jans		
Runner-up		2005	BBSA Belgian Championship (Women's')	Isabelle Jonckheere	1–4	
Runner-up		2006	BBSA Belgian Championship (Women's')	Isabelle Jonckheere	1–4	
Runner-up		2012	BBSA Belgian Championship (Women's')	Wendy Jans	3–4	
Runner-up		2013	BBSA Belgian Championship (Women's')	Wendy Jans	1–4	
Runner-up		2014	BBSA Belgian Championship (Women's')	Wendy Jans	0–4	
Runner-up		2016	BBSA Belgian Championship (Women's')	Wendy Jans	0–4	
Runner-up		2018	Women's EBSA European Snooker Championship	Wendy Jans	0–4	
Runner-up		2019	BBSA Belgian Championship (Women's')	Wendy Jans	0–4	
Winner		2020	Belgian Women's Open (Challenge Cup) (Note: For players who did not reach the last 16 of the 2020 Belgian Women's Open)	Zoe Killington	2–0	
Winner		2020	Belgian Women's Open (Seniors)	Jackie Ellis	2–0	

=== Team ===
Outcome	No.	Year	Championship	Opponent	Score	Ref.
Winner		2017	European Team Championship, with Wendy Jans (Belgium 1)	Anastasia Nechaeva and Daria Sirotina (Russia 1)	4–3	
