= 2015 IBSF World Snooker Championship – Women's =

IBSF World Snooker Championship
Tournament information
- Dates: 9–21 November 2015
- City: Hurghada
- Country: Egypt
- Organisation: IBSF
- Total prize fund: $8,000
- Highest break: (Belgium) Wendy Jans (94)

Final
- Champion: (Belgium) Wendy Jans
- Runner-up: (Russia) Anastasia Nechaeva
- Score: 5–1

The 2015 IBSF World Snooker Championship is an amateur snooker tournament that took place from 9 November to 21 November 2015 in Hurghada, Egypt.

The event was originally due to take place in Sharm el-Sheikh, however due to the Metrojet Flight 9268 crash the tournament was relocated to Hurghada. Because of this many competitors withdrew from the competition amid safety fears, Including the entire Qatari, Moroccan and English teams, the latter of which would have featured former world champion Reanne Evans.

The tournament was won by 10th seed Wendy Jans who defeated Anastasia Nechaeva 5–1 in the final. This victory was Jans fourth consecutive tournament win and her fifth overall.

== Results ==
=== Group round ===
==== Group A ====
Place	Seed	Team	Matches	Matches won	Frames won	Frames lost	Difference
1	1	(India) Amee Kamani	4	4	12	0	12
2	10	(Belgium) Wendy Jans	4	3	9	3	6
3	19	(Australia) Anna Lynch	4	2	6	7	–1
4	21	(Bahrain) Nahla Sunni	4	1	4	9	–5
5		(Tunisia) Marzouki Sarra	4	0	0	12	–12

==== Group B ====
Place	Seed	Team	Matches	Matches won	Frames won	Frames lost	Difference
1	3	(Thailand) Waratthanun Sukritthanes	4	4	12	1	11
2	9	(India) Chitra Magimairajan	4	3	10	5	5
3	20	(Australia) Theresa Whitten	4	2	8	6	2
4	23	(South Africa) Joy Lyn Willenberg	4	1	3	9	–6
5		(Egypt) Maha Helmy	4	0	0	12	–12

==== Group C ====
Place	Seed	Team	Matches	Matches won	Frames won	Frames lost	Difference
1	5	(Russia) Anastasia Nechaeva	5	5	15	4	11
2	7	(Germany) Diana Stateczny	5	4	13	5	8
3	14	(India) Arantxa Sanchis	5	3	12	8	4
4	17	(Australia) Kathy Howden	5	2	12	9	–3
5		(Iran) Akram Mohammadi Amini	5	1	5	13	–8
6		(Egypt) Salma Moussa	5	0	3	15	–12

==== Group D ====
Place	Seed	Team	Matches	Matches won	Frames won	Frames lost	Difference
1	4	(Thailand) Siripaporn Nuanthakhamjan	4	4	12	2	10
2	11	(Russia) Daria Sirotina	4	3	9	4	5
3	15	(South Africa) Nicola Illse Rossouw	4	2	9	6	3
4	24	(India) Sunita Khandelwal	4	1	3	10	–7
5		(Tunisia) Hadiaoui Abir	4	0	1	12	–11

==== Group E ====
Place	Seed	Team	Matches	Matches won	Frames won	Frames lost	Difference
1	6	(Hong Kong) Ng On Yee	5	4	14	5	9
2	8	(Latvia) Tatjana Vasiljeva	5	4	13	6	7
3	13	(India) Varsha Sanjeev	5	3	12	7	5
4	18	(Germany) Jennifer Zehentner	5	3	11	8	3
5		(Egypt) Gantan Elaskary	5	1	3	13	–10
6		(South Africa) Madeleine Jeanne Young	5	0	1	15	–14

==== Group F ====
Place	Seed	Team	Matches	Matches won	Frames won	Frames lost	Difference
1	2	(India) Vidya Pillai	4	4	12	1	11
2	12	(Australia) Jessica Woods	4	3	9	6	3
3	16	(South Africa) Amy Claire King	4	2	8	9	–1
4	22	(France) Angélique Vialard	4	1	6	10	–4
5		(Russia) Anastasija Singurindi	4	0	3	12	–9

=== Knockout rounds ===
Round 1 Best of 7 frames
17	(Australia) Kathy Howden	2
16	(South Africa) Amy Claire King	4
9	(India) Chitra Magimairajan	4
24	(India) Sunita Khandelwal	0
21	(Bahrain) Nahla Sunni	0
12	(Australia) Jessica Woods	4
13	(India) Varsha Sanjeev	2
20	(Australia) Theresa Whitten	4
19	(Australia) Theresa Whitten	0
14	(India) Arantxa Sanchis	4
11	(Russia) Daria Sirotina	4
22	(France) Angélique Vialard	1
23	(South Africa) Joy Lyn Willenberg	1
10	(Belgium) Wendy Jans	4
15	(South Africa) Nicola Illse Rossouw	2
18	(Germany) Jennifer Zehentner	4

Round 2 Best of 7 frames
1	(India) Amee Kamani	4
16	(South Africa) Amy Claire King	0
9	(India) Amee Kamani	4
8	(Latvia) Tatjana Vasiljeva	2
5	(Russia) Anastasia Nechaeva	4
12	(Australia) Jessica Woods	2
20	(Australia) Theresa Whitten	1
4	(Thailand) Siripaporn Nuanthakhamjan	4
4	(Thailand) Siripaporn Nuanthakhamjan	4
14	(India) Arantxa Sanchis	3
11	(Russia) Daria Sirotina	1
6	(Hong Kong) Ng On Yee	4
7	(Germany) Diana Stateczny	0
10	(Belgium) Wendy Jans	4
18	(Germany) Jennifer Zehentner	0
2	(India) Vidya Pillai	4

Quarter-Finals; Best of 7 frames
1	(India) Amee Kamani	4
9	(India) Chitra Magimairajan	3
5	(Russia) Anastasia Nechaeva	4
4	(Thailand) Siripaporn Nuanthakhamjan	0
3	(Thailand) Waratthanun Sukritthanes	4
6	(Hong Kong) Ng On Yee	3
10	(Belgium) Wendy Jans	4
2	(India) Vidya Pillai	2

Semi-Finals; Best of 7 frames
1	(India) Amee Kamani	3
5	(Russia) Anastasia Nechaeva	4
3	(Thailand) Waratthanun Sukritthanes	1
10	(Belgium) Wendy Jans	4

Final; Best of 9 frames
5	(Russia) Anastasia Nechaeva	1
10	(Belgium) Wendy Jans	5
