= European Tour 2015/2016 – Event 1 =

European Tour 2015/2016 Event 1
Tournament information
- Dates: 29 July – 2 August 2015
- Venue: Arena Riga
- City: Riga
- Country: Latvia
- Organisation: World Snooker
- Format: Minor-ranking event
- Total prize fund: €125,000
- Winner's share: €25,000
- Highest break: Ricky Walden (ENG) (142)

Final
- Champion: Barry Hawkins (ENG)
- Runner-up: Tom Ford (ENG)
- Score: 4–1

The European Tour 2015/2016 – Event 1 (also known as the 2015 Kaspersky Lab Riga Open) was a professional minor-ranking snooker tournament which took place between 29 July and 2 August 2015 at the Arena Riga in Riga, Latvia.

Mark Selby was the defending champion, but he lost 1–4 to Ken Doherty in the Last 32.

Barry Hawkins won the tournament, defeating Tom Ford 4–1 in the final.

== Prize fund ==
The breakdown of prize money of the event is shown below:

	Prize fund
Winner	€25,000
Runner-up	€12,000
Semi-finalist	€6,000
Quarter-finalist	€4,000
Last 16	€2,300
Last 32	€1,200
Last 64	€700
Total	€125,000

== Main draw ==
=== Preliminary rounds ===
==== Round 1 ====
Best of 7 frames

(England) Simon Dent	4–0	(Norway) Anita Maflin
(England) Samuel Thistlewhite	4–1	(Belgium) Hans Blanckaert
(Cyprus) Antonis Poullous	0–4	(Wales) Kishan Hirani
(England) Elliot Slessor	w/d–w/o	(Lithuania) Vilius Schulte-Ebbert
(Sweden) Arpat Pulat	1–4	(England) Josh Mulholland
(Ukraine) Tetyana Volovelska	0–4	(England) Christopher Keogan
(Malta) Brian Cini	2–4	(Latvia) Anna Prisjaznuka
(Russia) Aleksandr Kurgankov	4–3	(England) Andrew Urbaniak
(Wales) Ben Jones	3–4	(Belgium) Jurian Heusdens
(Australia) Shannon Dixon	w/o–w/d	(England) Michael Williams
(Northern Ireland) Conor McCormack	2–4	(England) Richard Beckham
(Japan) Keishin Kamihasi	w/o–w/d	(England) Adam Duffy
(England) Julian Mills	w/o–w/d	(England) Chris Norbury
(Latvia) Maris Volajs	4–3	(Latvia) Tatjana Vasiljeva
(Wales) Thomas Rees	4–2	(Poland) Mateusz Baranowski
(England) Darren Cook	w/d–w/o	(England) Jake Nicholson
(Belgium) Lieven Vanthournout	0–4	(England) Zack Richardson
(Malta) Walter Theuma	0–4	(Germany) Sascha Lippe
(England) Bhavesh Sodha	w/d–w/o	(Germany) Lukas Kleckers

(Austria) Andreas Ploner	4–1	(England) Louis Heathcote
(England) Joe O'Connor	4–1	(England) Adam Edge
(Belgium) Tomasz Skalski	4–0	(Russia) Maxim Maximov
(England) Charlie Walters	w/d–w/o	(England) Ryan Causton
(Republic of Ireland) Brendan O'Donoghue	3–4	(Germany) Roman Dietzel
(England) William Lemons	w/d–w/o	(Wales) Callum Lloyd
(England) Anthony Jeffers	4–1	(England) Thomas Barton
(England) John Parkin	2–4	(Wales) Jamie Clarke
(Republic of Ireland) Daniel O'Regan	2–4	(Malta) Alex Borg
(Gibraltar) Chris Mason	0–4	(England) Jeff Cundy
(Australia) Heath Williams	4–3	(England) Freddie Blunden
(Belgium) Jeff Jacobs	1–4	(Israel) Shachar Ruberg
(England) Joe Steele	4–2	(Wales) Jack Bradford
(England) Oliver Brown	w/d–w/o	(Germany) Sascha Breuer
(Republic of Ireland) Dessie Sheehan	4–1	(Russia) Arsen Balishyan
(Denmark) Ejler Hame	1–4	(Germany) Robin Otto
(England) Lewis John Calcutt	4–0	(Israel) Dana Amir
(England) Saqib Nasir	4–1	(Poland) Kacper Filipiak

==== Round 2 ====
Best of 7 frames

(England) Sam Harvey	4–3	(England) Simon Dent
(Wales) Alex Taubman	1–4	(England) Samuel Thistlewhite
(England) Patrick Whelan	1–4	(Wales) Kishan Hirani
(Lithuania) Vilius Schulte-Ebbert	1–4	(England) Josh Mulholland
(Latvia) Gunars Puce	0–4	(England) Christopher Keogan
(Latvia) Arturs Klindzans	1–4	(Latvia) Anna Prisjaznuka
(Estonia) Andres Petrov	4–2	(Russia) Aleksandr Kurgankov
(Belgium) Jurian Heusdens	4–1	(Australia) Shannon Dixon
(Malta) Mario Brincat	1–4	(England) Richard Beckham
(England) Phil O'Kane	4–0	(Japan) Keishin Kamihashi
(England) Nico Elton	1–4	(England) Julian Mills
(Latvia) Rodion Judin	4–3	(Latvia) Maris Volajs
(Romania) Corina Maracine	0–4	(Wales) Thomas Rees
(England) Jake Nicholson	0–4	(England) Zack Richardson
(Germany) Sascha Lippe	1–4	(Germany) Lukas Kleckers

(Malta) Shaun Sultana	0–4	(Austria) Andreas Ploner
(Scotland) Michael Collumb	0–4	(England) Joe O'Connor
(Republic of Ireland) Tony Corrigan	2–4	(Belgium) Tomasz Skalski
(England) Hammad Miah	4–0	(England) Ryan Causton
(England) George Parkin	0–4	(Germany) Roman Dietzel
(England) Matthew Glasby	1–4	(Wales) Callum Lloyd
(England) Anthony Jeffers	0–4	(Wales) Jamie Clarke
(England) Ashley Carty	1–4	(Malta) Alex Borg
(England) Kobi Mates	n/s–w/o	(England) Jeff Cundy
(England) Joe Roberts	4–1	(Australia) Heath Williams
(Israel) Shachar Ruberg	3–4	(England) Joe Steele
(England) Damian Wilks	4–3	(Germany) Sascha Breuer
(Republic of Ireland) Dessie Sheehan	3–4	(Germany) Robin Otto
(Republic of Ireland) Josh Boileau	w/d–w/o	(England) Lewis John Calcutt
(England) Ashley Hugill	4–0	(England) Saqib Nasir

=== Main rounds ===
==== Top half ====
===== Section 1 =====
Last 128; Best of 7 frames
(England) Mark Selby	4
(England) Sanderson Lam	1
(England) Joel Walker	4
(England) Paul Davison	2
(Republic of Ireland) Ken Doherty	4
(England) Sam Harvey	2
(England) Gary Wilson	4
(England) Samuel Thistlewhite	1
(Wales) Jamie Jones	w/o
(Pakistan) Hamza Akbar	w/d
(Belgium) Luca Brecel	4
(Wales) Kishan Hirani	3
(England) Michael Georgiou	4
(England) Josh Mulholland	2
(Wales) Ryan Day	4
(England) Allan Taylor	0

Last 64; Best of 7 frames
(England) Mark Selby	4
(England) Joel Walker	1
(Republic of Ireland) Ken Doherty	4
(England) Gary Wilson	0
(Wales) Jamie Jones	1
(Belgium) Luca Brecel	4
(England) Michael Georgiou	0
(Wales) Ryan Day	4

Last 32; Best of 7 frames
(England) Mark Selby	1
(Republic of Ireland) Ken Doherty	4
(Belgium) Luca Brecel	3
(Wales) Ryan Day	4

Last 16; Best of 7 frames
(Republic of Ireland) Ken Doherty	1
(Wales) Ryan Day	4

===== Section 2 =====
Last 128; Best of 7 frames
(Scotland) Graeme Dott	4
(England) Christopher Keogan	1
(England) Andrew Higginson	w/o
(Iran) Hossein Vafaei	w/d
(England) Mike Dunn	4
(Latvia) Anna Prisjaznuka	0
(Wales) Matthew Stevens	4
(England) Steven Hallworth	1
(England) Rod Lawler	2
(Estonia) Andres Petrov	4
(England) Peter Lines	4
(Belgium) Jurian Heusdens	1
(Scotland) Scott Donaldson	4
(Scotland) Michael Leslie	3
(Northern Ireland) Mark Allen	4
(Wales) Gareth Allen	0

Last 64; Best of 7 frames
(Scotland) Graeme Dott	4
(England) Andrew Higginson	1
(England) Mike Dunn	4
(Wales) Matthew Stevens	3
(Estonia) Andres Petrov	0
(England) Peter Lines	4
(Scotland) Scott Donaldson	0
(Northern Ireland) Mark Allen	4

Last 32; Best of 7 frames
(Scotland) Graeme Dott	4
(England) Mike Dunn	1
(England) Peter Lines	2
(Northern Ireland) Mark Allen	4

Last 16; Best of 7 frames
(Scotland) Graeme Dott	4
(Northern Ireland) Mark Allen	1

===== Section 3 =====
Last 128; Best of 7 frames
(England) Barry Hawkins	4
(England) Richard Beckham	1
(England) Robbie Williams	4
(England) Ian Glover	2
(England) Craig Steadman	4
(England) Phil O'Kane	0
(Scotland) Anthony McGill	4
(England) Julian Mills	0
(England) Mark King	4
(Latvia) Rodion Judin	0
(England) Sam Baird	2
(England) Jason Weston	4
(England) Mitchell Mann	2
(Wales) Lee Walker	4
(Wales) Michael White	4
(Wales) Thomas Rees	2

Last 64; Best of 7 frames
(England) Barry Hawkins	4
(England) Robbie Williams	0
(England) Craig Steadman	1
(Scotland) Anthony McGill	4
(England) Mark King	4
(England) Jason Weston	2
(Wales) Lee Walker	2
(Wales) Michael White	4

Last 32; Best of 7 frames
(England) Barry Hawkins	4
(Scotland) Anthony McGill	1
(England) Mark King	0
(Wales) Michael White	4

Last 16; Best of 7 frames
(England) Barry Hawkins	4
(Wales) Michael White	1

===== Section 4 =====
Last 128; Best of 7 frames
(Scotland) Stephen Maguire	4
(England) Zack Richardson	1
(England) Anthony Hamilton	0
(Germany) Lukas Kleckers	4
(England) Jimmy Robertson	2
(Scotland) Eden Sharav	4
(Scotland) Alan McManus	4
(England) David Grace	2
(Norway) Kurt Maflin	1
(England) Sean O'Sullivan	4
(Finland) Robin Hull	3
(Malta) Tony Drago	4
(England) Mark Joyce	3
(England) Chris Wakelin	4
(England) Judd Trump	4
(England) Sydney Wilson	2

Last 64; Best of 7 frames
(Scotland) Stephen Maguire	4
(Germany) Lukas Kleckers	0
(Scotland) Eden Sharav	0
(Scotland) Alan McManus	4
(England) Sean O'Sullivan	4
(Malta) Tony Drago	3
(England) Chris Wakelin	1
(England) Judd Trump	4

Last 32; Best of 7 frames
(Scotland) Stephen Maguire	2
(Scotland) Alan McManus	4
(England) Sean O'Sullivan	2
(England) Judd Trump	4

Last 16; Best of 7 frames
(Scotland) Alan McManus	4
(England) Judd Trump	1

==== Bottom half ====
===== Section 5 =====
Last 128; Best of 7 frames
(England) Shaun Murphy	4
(Austria) Andreas Ploner	2
(India) Aditya Mehta	4
(Wales) Duane Jones	3
(England) Jack Lisowski	4
(Scotland) Rhys Clark	1
(England) Peter Ebdon	4
(England) Nigel Bond	3
(England) Matthew Selt	4
(England) Joe O'Connor	1
(Northern Ireland) Joe Swail	2
(England) Alfie Burden	4
(England) Liam Highfield	2
(Belgium) Tomasz Skalski	4
(England) Robert Milkins	4
(Scotland) Fraser Patrick	1

Last 64; Best of 7 frames
(England) Shaun Murphy	4
(India) Aditya Mehta	1
(England) Jack Lisowski	1
(England) Peter Ebdon	4
(England) Matthew Selt	4
(England) Alfie Burden	1
(Belgium) Tomasz Skalski	2
(England) Robert Milkins	4

Last 32; Best of 7 frames
(England) Shaun Murphy	4
(England) Peter Ebdon	2
(England) Matthew Selt	4
(England) Robert Milkins	3

Last 16; Best of 7 frames
(England) Shaun Murphy	1
(England) Matthew Selt	4

===== Section 6 =====
Last 128; Best of 7 frames
(England) Mark Davis	3
(England) Hammad Miah	4
(England) Stuart Carrington	1
(Malaysia) Thor Chuan Leong	4
(England) Rory McLeod	4
(Germany) Roman Dietzel	1
(Republic of Ireland) Fergal O'Brien	4
(Wales) Callum Lloyd	1
(England) Michael Holt	4
(England) Jimmy White	2
(England) Kyren Wilson	4
(Scotland) Ross Muir	1
(England) Tom Ford	4
(Wales) Jamie Clarke	3
(England) Joe Perry	4
(Malta) Alex Borg	0

Last 64; Best of 7 frames
(England) Hammad Miah	4
(Malaysia) Thor Chuan Leong	3
(England) Rory McLeod	4
(Republic of Ireland) Fergal O'Brien	0
(England) Michael Holt	4
(England) Kyren Wilson	3
(England) Tom Ford	4
(England) Joe Perry	3

Last 32; Best of 7 frames
(England) Hammad Miah	2
(England) Rory McLeod	4
(England) Michael Holt	3
(England) Tom Ford	4

Last 16; Best of 7 frames
(England) Rory McLeod	2
(England) Tom Ford	4

===== Section 7 =====
Last 128; Best of 7 frames
(England) Ricky Walden	4
(England) Zak Surety	3
(Scotland) Jamie Burnett	w/d
(Isle of Man) Darryl Hill	w/o
(England) Ian Burns	3
(England) Jamie Cope	4
(England) Ben Woollaston	4
(Australia) Vinnie Calabrese	0
(England) Martin Gould	w/d
(England) Martin O'Donnell	w/o
(England) Michael Wasley	1
(England) Jeff Cundy	4
(Northern Ireland) Gerard Greene	4
(England) James Cahill	2
(Wales) Mark Williams	4
(England) Barry Pinches	1

Last 64; Best of 7 frames
(England) Ricky Walden	4
(Isle of Man) Darryl Hill	1
(England) Jamie Cope	1
(England) Ben Woollaston	4
(England) Martin O'Donnell	4
(England) Jeff Cundy	2
(Northern Ireland) Gerard Greene	2
(Wales) Mark Williams	4

Last 32; Best of 7 frames
(England) Ricky Walden	1
(England) Ben Woollaston	4
(England) Martin O'Donnell	0
(Wales) Mark Williams	4

Last 16; Best of 7 frames
(England) Ben Woollaston	4
(Wales) Mark Williams	2

===== Section 8 =====
Last 128; Best of 7 frames
(Scotland) John Higgins	2
(England) Joe Roberts	4
(England) Oliver Lines	4
(Wales) Daniel Wells	2
(Wales) Dominic Dale	4
(England) Chris Melling	0
(England) Ali Carter	4
(England) Joe Steele	0
(China) Liang Wenbo	4
(England) Damian Wilks	0
(Republic of Ireland) David Morris	4
(Germany) Robin Otto	0
(England) David Gilbert	4
(England) Lewis John Calcutt	0
(England) Stuart Bingham	4
(England) Ashley Hugill	1

Last 64; Best of 7 frames
(England) Joe Roberts	0
(England) Oliver Lines	4
(Wales) Dominic Dale	1
(England) Ali Carter	4
(China) Liang Wenbo	4
(Republic of Ireland) David Morris	1
(England) David Gilbert	3
(England) Stuart Bingham	4

Last 32; Best of 7 frames
(England) Oliver Lines	4
(England) Ali Carter	2
(China) Liang Wenbo	4
(England) Stuart Bingham	1

Last 16; Best of 7 frames
(England) Oliver Lines	0
(China) Liang Wenbo	4

==== Finals ====
Quarter-finals; Best of 7 frames
(Wales) Ryan Day	0
(Scotland) Graeme Dott	4
(England) Barry Hawkins	4
(Scotland) Alan McManus	2
(England) Matthew Selt	3
(England) Tom Ford	4
(England) Ben Woollaston	4
(China) Liang Wenbo	2

Semi-finals; Best of 7 frames
(Scotland) Graeme Dott	1
(England) Barry Hawkins	4
(England) Tom Ford	4
(England) Ben Woollaston	1

Final; Best of 7 frames
(England) Barry Hawkins	4
(England) Tom Ford	1

== Final ==
Final: Best of 7 frames. Referee: Milosz Olborski. Arena Riga, Riga, Latvia, 2 August 2015.
Tom Ford; England	1–4	Barry Hawkins; England
72–30 (67), 0–73 (65), 41–61, 39–79 (57), 1–78 (62)
67	Highest break	65
0	Century breaks	0
1	50+ breaks	3

== Century breaks ==
- 142, 130 – Ricky Walden
- 140, 132, 108 – Graeme Dott
- 128, 120 – Barry Hawkins
- 127, 104 – Ali Carter
- 127 – Tom Ford
- 126, 118 – Matthew Selt
- 124 – Matthew Stevens
- 123, 105 – Alan McManus
- 122 – Robin Hull
- 119, 117, 110 – Judd Trump
- 119 – Mark Selby
- 119 – Christopher Keogan
- 116 – Jamie Clarke
- 113, 107 – Stephen Maguire
- 112 – Joe Roberts
- 111, 104 – Andreas Ploner
- 109 – Liang Wenbo
- 108, 104 – Joe Perry
- 108 – Mark Williams
- 106 – Jimmy White
- 105 – Ken Doherty
- 105 – Ryan Day
- 105 – Joe O'Connor
- 102, 100 – Ben Woollaston
- 102 – Craig Steadman
- 102 – Michael White
- 102 – Peter Ebdon
- 101, 101 – Mark Allen
- 101 – Anthony McGill
- 101 – Stuart Bingham
- 101 – Dominic Dale
