= Shi Chunxia =

Chinese snooker player

Sport
- Country: China
- Sport: Snooker

Shi Chunxia (Chinese: 石春霞) is a Chinese snooker player. She was runner-up in the 2013 IBSF World Snooker Championship for Women.

== Biography ==
Shi was the runner-up in the 2013 IBSF World Snooker Championship. She won all of her group games, (3–0 Arantxa Sanchis, 3–0 Dalia Alska, 3–1 Daria Sirotina, 3–0 Amy Claire King, 3–0 Judy Dangerfield, and 3–1 Manon Melief) before beating Nikoleta Nikolova in the last 16. Her quarter-final against Amornrat Uamduang went to the deciding frame, with Shi going through 4–3. Her semi-final also went to the last frame, where she registered a 4–3 victory over future World Women's Snooker Champion Ng On-yee. In the final, Wendy Jans won the first two frames, with Shi taking three of the next four to level at 3–3. Jans then won the last two frames to take the title. Jans admitted that the last two frames of the final were closely fought, and attributed her win to her greater experience.

In 2019 she joined the World Women's Snooker circuit, and in the 2019 World Women's 10-Red Championship, her first event, gained wins over Jenny Poulter, Ploychompoo Laokiatphong and Maria Catalano, before losing 3–0 to Reanne Evans in the semi-final.

Having taken part in only two events on the women's snooker circuit, Shi began the 2019–20 season ranked 44th.

== Titles and achievements ==
- 2013 Asian Indoor Games – 6-Reds Women. Quarter finalist
- 2013 IBSF World Snooker Championship – Women. Runner-up
- 2019 World Women's 10-Red Championship. Semi-finalist
