= 2011 WPA World Nine-ball Junior Championship =

World Junior pool championship, held September 2011

2011 WPA World Nine-ball Juniors Championship
Tournament information
- Dates: 1–3 September 2011
- Venue: Hotel Lysogory
- City: Kielce
- Country: Poland
- Organisation: WPA
- Format: double elimination, single elimination

Final
- Champion: Marek Kudlik (boys); Oliwia Zalewska (girls)

The 2011 WPA World Nine-ball Junior Championships was the 20th hosting of the Junior World Championship in the pool discipline 9-Ball. The event ran from 1–3 September 2011 in Kielce, Poland.

== Tournament format ==
All three competitions were first held in the double-elimination tournament with a single-elimination tournament from the quarter-finals onwards. The events were all played under the winner-breaks format.

=== Boys event ===
Quarterfinals
1	(Germany) Lars Kuckherm	5
8	(Netherlands) Marc Bijsterbosch	11
4	(Poland) Marek Kudlik	11
5	(Russia) David Maslov	9
2	(Russia) Vitaly Pavlukhin	4
7	(Poland) Konrad Piekarski	11
3	(Hungary) Bence Varga	11
6	(Bulgaria) Radostin Dimov	10

Semifinals
(Netherlands) Marc Bijsterbosch	10
(Poland) Marek Kudlik	11
(Poland) Konrad Piekarski	11
(Hungary) Bence Varga	10

Finals
(Poland) Marek Kudlik	11
(Poland) Konrad Piekarski	9

=== Girls event ===
Semifinals
1	(Belgium) Kamila Khodjaeva	5
4	(Poland) Oliwia Zalewska	9
3	(Russia) Anastasia Nechaeva	9
2	(Russia) Daria Sirotina	8

Finals
(Poland) Oliwia Zalewska	9
(Russia) Anastasia Nechaeva	7
