= 2006 IBSF World Snooker Championship =

The 2006 IBSF World Snooker Championship was an amateur snooker event, sanctioned by the International Billiards and Snooker Federation, held at the Amman Olympics Sports Centre in Amman, Jordan from November 5-November 15, 2006.

== Results ==
=== Men ===
A total of 32 players qualified for finishing in the top 4 positions in eight groups. They were drawn into a 32 player knock-out bracket to decide the winner.

Round of 32
(England) Craig Steadman	5
(Hong Kong) Au Chi-wai	1
(Australia) Aaron Mahoney	2
(China) Liu Chuang	5
(India) Manan Chandra	5
(New Zealand) Chris McBreen	2
(Wales) Andrew Pagett	5
(Republic of Ireland) John Connors	3
(Belgium) Bjorn Haneveer	1
(Hong Kong) Fung Kwok Wai	5
(Singapore) Keith Boon	4
(Australia) Steve Mifsud	5
(Netherlands) Gerrit bij de Leij	2
(England) Daniel Ward	5
(India) Pankaj Advani	5
(Thailand) Phaitoon Phonbun	1
(Norway) Kurt Maflin	5
(Germany) L. Munstermann	2
(England) Martin O'Donnell	5
(Australia) James Mifsud	0
(Wales) Philip Williams	5
(South Africa) Mutaliep Allie	2
(Thailand) Supoj Saenla	5
(Republic of Ireland) B. O'Donaghue	4
(China) Yuan Li	3
(Egypt) Wael Talaat	5
(Pakistan) Naveen Perwani	5
(United Arab Emirates) Mohammed Al Joker	1
(Poland) Rafal Jewtuch	2
(Netherlands) Stefan Mazrocis	5
(Thailand) Atthasit Mahitthi	5
(Chinese Taipei) Lee Po-hsien	1

Round of 16
(England) Craig Steadman	5
(China) Liu Chuang	4
(India) Manan Chandra	5
(Wales) Andrew Pagett	3
(Hong Kong) Fung Kwok Wai	5
(Australia) Steve Mifsud	3
(England) Daniel Ward	5
(India) Pankaj Advani	3
(Norway) Kurt Maflin	5
(England) Martin O'Donnell	1
(Wales) Philip Williams	5
(Thailand) Supoj Saenla	1
(Egypt) Wael Talaat	4
(Pakistan) Naveen Perwani	5
(Netherlands) Stefan Mazrocis	3
(Thailand) Atthasit Mahitthi	5

Quarter finals
(England) Craig Steadman	3
(India) Manan Chandra	6
(Hong Kong) Fung Kwok Wai	3
(England) Daniel Ward	6
(Norway) Kurt Maflin	6
(Wales) Philip Williams	3
(Pakistan) Naveen Perwani	5
(Thailand) Atthasit Mahitthi	6

Semi finals
(India) Manan Chandra	7
(England) Daniel Ward	8
(Norway) Kurt Maflin	8
(Thailand) Atthasit Mahitthi	4

Final
(England) Daniel Ward	8
(Norway) Kurt Maflin	11

=== Women ===
Source: Snooker Scene

Reanne Evans, the 2004 champion, did not enter the event. There were twenty entries, and two qualifying groups of ten players were set, each to be played as a round-robin, with the top four from each group qualifying for the eight-player knock-out phase to decide the winner. Following withdrawals, only nine players participated in each group. Wendy Jans scored nine of the eleven top breaks in the competition on her way to winning the title.

Quarter-finals
(Belgium) Wendy Jans	4
(Norway) Anita Rizzuti	1
(France) Angélique Vialard	0
(New Zealand) Ramona Belmont	4
(India) Anuja Thakur	4
(Australia) Kathy Parashis	1
(Hong Kong) Jaique Ip	4
(Poland) Hanna Mergies	3

Semi-finals
(Belgium) Wendy Jans	4
(New Zealand) Ramona Belmont	0
(India) Anuja Thakur	2
(Hong Kong) Jaique Ip	4

Final
(Belgium) Wendy Jans	5
(Hong Kong) Jaique Ip	0
