= 2019 World Team Trophy (cue sports) =

Tournament information
- Dates: 11–12 March 2019
- Venue: Roissy-en-France
- City: Paris
- Country: France
- Organisation: Fédération française de billard, World Confederation of Billiards Sports
- Format: Snooker, Carom, Pool team event

The World Team Trophy was a team cue sports event, held in Roissy-en-France, Paris, France. The event was held between 11 and 12 March 2019. Teams of three players from different disciplines competed in the disciplines of pool, snooker and carrom. The event saw both a men's and women's tournament. The tournament received teams from France, Europe, Asia and Rest of the World.

The event was won by Team Europe in the men's competition, whilst Asia won the women's competition. The event was the first tournament of its kind, with all three disciplines being played across tables simultaneously.

== Teams ==
=== Men ===
Nation/Region	Carom	Nine-Ball	Snooker
France	Jérémy Bury	Fabio Rizzi	Brian Ochoiski
Europe	Frédéric Caudron	Joshua Filler	Kyren Wilson
Asia	Quoc Nguyen	Johann Chua	Xu Si
Rest of World	Sameh Sidhom	Brandon Shuff	Igor Figueiredo

=== Women ===
Nation/Region	Carom	Nine-Ball	Snooker
France	Céline Jacques	Séverine Titaux	Juliette Proix
Europe	Gülşen Degener	Jasmin Ouschan	Anastasia Nechaeva
Asia	Pheavy Sruong	Kim Ga Young	Amee Kamani
Rest of World	Jackeline Perez	Soledad Ayala	Jessica Woods
