= 1976 World Amateur Snooker Championship =

Tournament information
- Dates: 12–30 October 1976
- Venue: President Hotel
- City: Johannesburg
- Country: South Africa
- Organisation: Billiards and Snooker Control Council, International Billiards and Snooker Federation
- Format: Round-robin and knockout
- Highest break: Doug Mountjoy (WAL), 107

Final
- Champion: Doug Mountjoy (WAL)
- Runner-up: Paul Mifsud (MLT)
- Score: 11–1

The 1976 World Amateur Snooker Championship was the seventh edition of the tournament also known as the IBSF World Snooker Championship. The 1976 tournament was played in Johannesburg from 12 to 30 October 1976. Doug Mountjoy defeated Paul Mifsud 11–1 in the final to win the title.

== Tournament summary ==
The first World Amateur Snooker Championship was held in 1963. The defending champion for 1976 was Ray Edmonds, who had won the tournament in 1972 and 1974. The 1976 tournament was held at the President Hotel, Johannesburg, South Africa, from 12 to 30 October 1976, with 24 participants playing in three eight-player round-robin groups followed by a knockout to determine the champion. Apartheid was in force in South Africa, and following the advice of their respective governments, players from India and Sri Lanka did not take part in the competition.

Doug Mountjoy was the only player to win all of his group matches. Edmonds lost the title when he was defeated 1–5 by Paul Mifsud in the quarter-finals. In another of the quarter-finals, Silvino Francisco eliminated his brother Manuel Francisco 5–1. The final was contested by Mountjoy and Mifsud, with Mountjoy taking a 6–0 lead by the end of the first session and completing an 11–1 victory in the second session on 29 October, meaning that the scheduled session for 30 October was not required.

Mountjoy compiled the highest break of the tournament, 107, during the group stage.

== Qualifying groups ==
The final tables are shown below. Players in bold qualified for the next round.

Group A

Player	MW	FW	FL	Break
**Doug Mountjoy (WAL)**	7	28	9	107
**Jimmy van Rensberg (RSA)**	5	24	16	72
**Ray Edmonds (ENG)**	4	20	18	77
Norman Stockman (NZL)	4	21	19	45
Eddie Sinclair (SCO)	4	21	21	51
Pascal Burke (IRE)	2	17	25	48
Johan van Niekerk (RSA)	1	17	27	35
Peter Reynolds (IOM)	1	14	27	46

Group B

Player	MW	FW	FL	Break
**Paul Mifsud (MLT)**	6	25	9	47
**Silvino Francisco (RSA)**	6	27	12	68
**Terry Griffiths (WAL)**	5	23	14	69
Chris Ross (ENG)	4	19	17	58
Robert Paquette (CAN)	4	22	22	72
Eddie Swaffield (NIR)	1	16	26	59
Leon Heywood (AUS)	1	13	27	46
Larry Watson (IRE)	1	9	27	45

Group C

Player	MW	FW	FL	Break
**Manuel Francisco (RSA)**	6	27	12	62
**Ron Atkins (AUS)**	6	25	12	45
**Roy Andrewartha (ENG)**	5	25	14	100
Jimmy Clint (NIR)	4	17	18	33
Bert Demarco (SCO)	3	21	21	75
Bernie Mikkelsen (CAN)	3	19	22	60
Kelvin Tristram (NZL)	1	9	27	46
Roy Cowley (IOM)	0	11	28	41

== Knockout ==
Players in bold denote match winners.

**Elimination Match**; Best of 7 frames
Player	Score	Player
**Terry Griffiths (WAL)**	**4**–0	Roy Andrewartha (ENG)

**Quarter-finals**; Best of 9 frames
**Doug Mountjoy (WAL)**	**5**
Ron Atkins (AUS)	1
**Silvino Francisco (RSA)**	**5**
Manuel Francisco (RSA)	1
**Jimmy van Rensberg (RSA)**	**5**
Terry Griffiths (WAL)	3
**Paul Mifsud (MLT)**	**5**
Ray Edmonds (ENG)	1

**Semi-finals**; Best of 15 frames
**Doug Mountjoy (WAL)**	**8**
Silvino Francisco (RSA)	2
Jimmy van Rensberg (RSA)	4
**Paul Mifsud (MLT)**	**8**

**Final**; Best of 21 frames
**Doug Mountjoy (WAL)**	**11**
Paul Mifsud (MLT)	1

== Final ==
Scores in bold indicate winning frame scores.

Final: Best of 21 frames. Johannesburg, 29 October 1976
**Doug Mountjoy** (Wales)	**11**–1	Paul Mifsud (Malta)
First session: **76**–18; **80**–21; **79**–21; **86**–36; **109**(62)-20; **80**–18; Second session: 25–**71**; **82**–24; **85**–29; **73**–29; **67**–48; **84**–28
