= Hanna Mergies =

Polish snooker player (born 1984)

Personal information
- Born: 21 November 1984 (age 41)

Sport
- Country: Poland
- Sport: Snooker

Hanna Mergies (born 21 November 1984) is a Polish amateur snooker player.

== European Snooker Championships ==
At the European Snooker Championship in 2001, Mergies won three of her four matches in the qualifying group, losing only to eventual champion Kelly Fisher. In the quarter-final, she lost 0–4 to Wendy Jans, who would finish the tournament as runner-up to Fisher. Mergies reached the quarter-finals again in 2002. In 2006 she went a stage further, losing reaching the semi-final, where she lost 2–4 to Isabelle Jonckheere. 2007 again saw Mergies reach the quarter-final and lose to the eventual champion, this time 0–4 to Reanne Evans. In 2011, Mergies was again a quarter-finalist, and this time it was Christelle Pedat who beat Mergies, 4–1.

Mergies and Małgorzata Kłys, representing Poland, reached the final of the 2007 EBSA European Team Championship, where they were beaten 0–5 by the Belgium 1 Team of Wendy Jans and Isabelle Jonckheere.

== IBSF World Snooker Championships ==
She reached the quarter finals at the 2006 IBSF World Championships in Amman, Jordan, where she was eliminated by Jaique Ip 3–4.
