= 2010 World Open (snooker) =

12bet.com World Open

Tournament information
- Dates: 18–26 September 2010
- Venue: S.E.C.C.
- City: Glasgow
- Country: Scotland
- Organisation: World Snooker
- Format: Ranking event
- Total prize fund: £502,500
- Winner's share: £100,000
- Highest break: Ronnie O'Sullivan (ENG) (147)

Final
- Champion: Neil Robertson (AUS)
- Runner-up: Ronnie O'Sullivan (ENG)
- Score: 5–1

The 2010 12bet.com World Open was a professional ranking snooker tournament held between 18 and 26 September 2010 at the S.E.C.C. in Glasgow, Scotland. This was the first time that the World Open was sponsored by 12bet.com.

Ronnie O'Sullivan made the 73rd official maximum break during his match against Mark King. This was O'Sullivan's record 10th official 147, however he had to be persuaded by referee Jan Verhaas to play the final black, as he became aware that there was no distinct prize money for a maximum break in the tournament and planned to end his break at 140. There was only a £4,000 prize for the highest break of the tournament.

Neil Robertson was the defending champion, and he retained his title by defeating Ronnie O'Sullivan 5–1 in the final.

== Prize fund ==
The breakdown of prize money for this year is shown below:

- Winner: £100,000
- Runner-up: £40,000
- Semi-final: £20,000
- Quarter-final: £12,500
- Last 16: £7,500
- Last 32: £5,000
- Last 64: £2,500
- Last 96: £1,500
- Stage one highest break: £500
- Stage two highest break: £4,000
- Total: £502,500

== Field ==
The field of the tournament of 128 players was as follows:

- 96 professional players on the Main Tour
- 10 Rileys Club qualifiers:
  - Middlesbrough: (England) Richard Beckham
  - Dunfermline: (Scotland) Marc Davis
  - Norwich: (Wales) Jamie Edwards
  - Leicester: (England) Ian Glover
  - Stevenage: (England) Sam Harvey
  - Guildford: (England) James Loft
  - Cardiff: (Wales) Allan Morgan
  - Preston: (England) John Whitty
  - Plymouth: (England) Matt Williams
- 10 independent club qualifiers:
  - South West Snooker Academy, Gloucester: (England) Sam Baird
  - Grove Snooker Centre, Romford: (England) Ryan Causton
  - The Ivy Rooms, Carlow: (Republic of Ireland) Jason Devaney
  - Keynsham Snooker Club, Bristol: (England) Mike Finn
  - Castle Snooker Club, Brighton: (England) Anish Gokool
  - QE1 Snooker Club, Belfast: (Northern Ireland) Julian Logue
  - The Q Club, Glasgow: (Scotland) Craig MacGillivray
  - Landywood Snooker Centre, Landywood: (England) Mitchell Mann
  - Northern Snooker Centre, Leeds: (England) James McGouran
  - The Q-Bar, Chester: (England) Chris Norbury
- 4 international qualifiers:
  - Bahrain: Habib Subah
  - Belgium: Mario Geudens
  - Germany: Lasse Münstermann
  - Thailand: Thepchaiya Un-Nooh
- Top 2 amateur players on the PTC Order of Merit:
  - (Wales) Daniel Wells
  - (England) Michael Wasley
- 2 ladies tour players:
  - (Belgium) Wendy Jans
  - (Norway) Anita Rizzuti
- 2 senior players:
  - (Wales) Darren Morgan
  - (England) Tony Knowles
- 2 youth players:
  - (England) Joel Walker
  - (Belgium) Luca Brecel

== Draw ==
=== Qualifying rounds ===
The first two rounds took place between 21 and 23 August 2010 at the World Snooker Academy, Sheffield. Eleven selected round three matches were held over until the start of the tournament in Glasgow. The rest took place at the Academy on 24 August. All matches were best of 5 frames. All times are BST.

==== Round 1 ====
All amateurs and players ranked 65–96 entered at this stage.

- Saturday, 21 August – 10:00
  - (Wales) Jamie Jones 3–0 (England) Tony Knowles
  - (England) Matt Williams 1–3 (England) Paul Davison
  - (England) John Whitty 0–3 (Thailand) Thanawat Thirapongpaiboon
  - (Thailand) Noppon Saengkham 3–1 (Belgium) Luca Brecel
  - (Brazil) Igor Figueiredo 3–2 (China) Liu Chuang
  - (England) Liam Highfield 3–1 (Wales) Michael White
- Saturday, 21 August – 12:00
  - (England) Justin Astley 3–2 (England) Michael Wasley
  - (England) Chris Norbury 3–0 (England) Richard Beckham
  - (England) Adam Wicheard 2–3 (Scotland) James McBain
  - (Wales) Daniel Wells 3–1 (England) Jamie O'Neill
  - (Wales) Jak Jones 1–3 (England) Joe Jogia
  - (Northern Ireland) Patrick Wallace 3–0 (Norway) Kurt Maflin
- Saturday, 21 August – 16:00
  - (England) Jack Lisowski 3–1 (England) Ryan Causton
  - (China) Xiao Guodong 3–0 (England) James Loft
  - (Thailand) Thepchaiya Un-Nooh 3–1 (England) Reanne Evans
  - (Northern Ireland) Julian Logue 1–3 (England) Joel Walker
  - (England) Mike Finn 0–3 (England) Kyren Wilson
  - (Bahrain) Habib Subah 1–3 (Wales) Darren Morgan
- Saturday, 21 August – 18:00
  - (England) Mitchell Mann 0–3 (England) Ben Woollaston
  - (Wales) Andrew Pagett 2–3 (England) Kuldesh Johal
  - (England) Anish Gokool 0–3 (England) Sam Harvey
  - (Germany) Patrick Einsle 2–3 (Northern Ireland) Dermot McGlinchey
  - (Thailand) Issara Kachaiwong 2–3 (England) James McGouran
  - (England) Sam Baird 3–2 (China) Zhang Anda
- Sunday, 22 August – 10:00
  - (Scotland) Anthony McGill 3–1 (England) Ian Glover
  - (Belgium) Mario Geudens 3–2 (Republic of Ireland) Jason Devaney
  - (Norway) Anita Rizzuti 0–3 (England) Alfie Burden
  - (Wales) Allan Morgan 0–3 (China) Liu Song
  - (Scotland) Marc Davis 0–3 (England) Matthew Couch
- Sunday, 22 August – 12:00
  - (Belgium) Wendy Jans 1–3 (England) Simon Bedford
  - (Wales) Jamie Edwards 1–3 (Scotland) Craig MacGillivray

==== Round 2 ====
Players ranked 33–64 entered at this stage.

- Sunday, 22 August – 12:00
  - (Scotland) Jamie Burnett 0–3 (England) Adrian Gunnell
  - (Wales) Dominic Dale 3–1 (England) Sam Harvey
  - (England) Ben Woollaston 3–0 (England) Justin Astley
  - (China) Liu Song 3–1 (England) Barry Pinches
- Sunday, 22 August – 16:00
  - (England) Anthony Hamilton 1–3 (Scotland) James McBain
  - (England) Jimmy White 3–0 (Republic of Ireland) Michael Judge
  - (Northern Ireland) Dermot McGlinchey 1–3 (England) Paul Davison
  - (Belgium) Mario Geudens 1–3 (Scotland) Anthony McGill
  - (England) Tom Ford 1–3 (England) Alfie Burden
  - (Wales) Paul Davies 3–2 (England) James McGouran
- Sunday, 22 August – 18:00
  - (Belgium) Bjorn Haneveer 3–2 (Northern Ireland) Joe Swail
  - (Thailand) Thepchaiya Un-Nooh 3–0 (England) Peter Lines
  - (England) Simon Bedford 3–2 (England) Jimmy Robertson
  - (England) Liam Highfield 2–3 (Republic of Ireland) Fergal O'Brien
  - (Thailand) Noppon Saengkham 0–3 (England) Martin Gould
  - (England) Matthew Couch 3–0 (England) Ian McCulloch
- Monday, 23 August – 10:00
  - (England) Jimmy Michie 3–2 (England) Mark Joyce
  - (Wales) Jamie Jones 3–0 (England) Sam Baird
  - (Wales) Darren Morgan 3–2 (China) Xiao Guodong
  - (Malta) Tony Drago 3–1 (England) Joel Walker
  - (Republic of Ireland) Joe Delaney 2–3 (Thailand) Thanawat Thirapongpaiboon
  - (England) Chris Norbury 1–3 (Scotland) Alan McManus
- Monday, 23 August – 12:00
  - (England) Stuart Pettman 3–0 (England) Kyren Wilson
  - (England) Matthew Selt 3–1 (Germany) Lasse Münstermann
  - (England) Rod Lawler 2–3 (England) Nigel Bond
  - (Scotland) Marcus Campbell 3–0 (Wales) Daniel Wells
  - (England) Jack Lisowski 1–3 (England) Andy Hicks
  - (England) Rory McLeod 3–1 (England) Kuldesh Johal
- Monday, 23 August – 16:00
  - (Brazil) Igor Figueiredo 3–0 (England) David Gilbert
  - (England) Robert Milkins 1–3 (Republic of Ireland) David Morris
  - (Northern Ireland) Patrick Wallace 1–3 (England) Joe Jogia
  - (Scotland) Craig MacGillivray 0–3 (Thailand) James Wattana

==== Round 3 ====
The top 32 players in the rankings entered the tournament at this stage.

- Tuesday, 24 August – 10:00
  - (England) Judd Trump 3–0 (Thailand) Thanawat Thirapongpaiboon
  - (Hong Kong) Marco Fu 3–2 (England) Alfie Burden
  - (England) Matthew Selt 0–3 (England) Martin Gould
  - (Republic of Ireland) Fergal O'Brien 3–1 (Wales) Dominic Dale
- Tuesday, 24 August – 12:00
  - (England) Ricky Walden 3–1 (England) Andy Hicks
  - (Wales) Darren Morgan 2–3 (Wales) Matthew Stevens
  - (England) Andrew Higginson 3–1 (China) Liang Wenbo
  - (Northern Ireland) Gerard Greene 2–3 (England) Joe Jogia
  - (Scotland) Marcus Campbell 3–1 (England) Simon Bedford
  - (China) Liu Song 3–1 (England) Michael Holt
- Tuesday, 24 August – 16:00
  - (Scotland) Alan McManus 3–0 (Scotland) Anthony McGill
  - (Thailand) James Wattana 2–3 (England) Jimmy Michie
  - (England) Rory McLeod 1–3 (England) Nigel Bond
  - (England) Mark Davis 3–0 (Wales) Jamie Jones
  - (Malta) Tony Drago 1–3 (England) Stephen Lee
  - (England) Mike Dunn 3–1 (Wales) Ryan Day
- Tuesday, 24 August – 18:00
  - (Republic of Ireland) David Morris 3–0 (England) Ben Woollaston
  - (Northern Ireland) Mark Allen 2–3 (Scotland) James McBain
- Tuesday, 24 August – 18:00
  - (England) Matthew Couch 3–0 (Wales) Paul Davies
  - (Republic of Ireland) Ken Doherty 3–2 (England) Joe Perry
  - (England) Stuart Bingham 2–3 (England) Jamie Cope
- Saturday, 18 September – 14:30
  - (Australia) Neil Robertson 3–1 (Scotland) Graeme Dott
  - (England) Ali Carter 3–1 (Thailand) Thepchaiya Un-Nooh
  - (England) Stuart Pettman 2–3 (Scotland) Stephen Maguire
- Saturday, 18 September – not before 19:00
  - (England) Steve Davis 1–3 (England) Peter Ebdon
  - (England) Shaun Murphy 0–3 (England) Dave Harold
- Sunday, 19 September – 14:00
  - (Scotland) Stephen Hendry 3–0 (Belgium) Bjorn Haneveer
  - (Wales) Mark Williams 3–0 (Brazil) Igor Figueiredo
  - (China) Ding Junhui 3–0 (England) Adrian Gunnell
- Sunday, 19 September – not before 19:00
  - (England) Paul Davison 1–3 (England) Jimmy White
  - (England) Mark Selby 2–3 (England) Barry Hawkins
- Monday, 20 September – 12:30
  - (England) Mark King 0–3 (England) Ronnie O'Sullivan

=== Main rounds ===
Matches were played on a roll-on/roll-off basis. Play started at the allocated time each day with a 15-minute interval between matches. The evening session did not start before the time indicated on the format.

The draw up to and including the semi-finals were made on a random basis. All matches up to and including the semi-finals were best of 5 frames and the final was best of 9 frames. All times are BST.

==== Last 32 ====
- Monday, 20 September – 12:30
  - (Wales) Matthew Stevens 2–3 (Scotland) Alan McManus
  - (England) Joe Jogia 1–3 (China) Liu Song
- Monday, 20 September – 19:00
  - (England) Jamie Cope 3–2 (England) Dave Harold
  - (England) Mike Dunn 1–3 (Scotland) Marcus Campbell
- Tuesday, 21 September – 13:00
  - (England) Ali Carter 1–3 (Wales) Mark Williams
  - (China) Ding Junhui 3–1 (England) Jimmy Michie
  - (England) Stephen Lee 3–2 (England) Nigel Bond
- Tuesday, 21 September – 19:00
  - (Scotland) Stephen Hendry 3–0 (England) Mark Davis
  - (England) Peter Ebdon 3–2 (Republic of Ireland) Fergal O'Brien
- Wednesday, 22 September – 12:30
  - (Australia) Neil Robertson 3–1 (Republic of Ireland) David Morris
- Wednesday, 22 September – not before 14:00
  - (England) Barry Hawkins 3–1 (Republic of Ireland) Ken Doherty
  - (Scotland) James McBain 0–3 (England) Ricky Walden
- Wednesday, 22 September – 19:00
  - (England) Judd Trump 2–3 (Scotland) Stephen Maguire
  - (England) Martin Gould 3–0 (England) Matthew Couch
- Thursday, 23 September – 12:30
  - (England) Ronnie O'Sullivan 3–1 (England) Jimmy White
  - (Hong Kong) Marco Fu 1–3 (England) Andrew Higginson

==== Last 16 ====
- Thursday, 23 September – 12:30
  - (Scotland) Marcus Campbell 0–3 (China) Ding Junhui
- Thursday, 23 September – 19:00
  - (Wales) Mark Williams 3–2 (England) Barry Hawkins
  - (England) Peter Ebdon 3–2 (China) Liu Song
- Friday, 24 September – 12:30
  - (England) Jamie Cope 1–3 (England) Ricky Walden
  - (Scotland) Stephen Hendry 1–3 (England) Ronnie O'Sullivan
  - (Scotland) Alan McManus 0–3 (Scotland) Stephen Maguire
- Friday, 24 September – 19:00
  - (Australia) Neil Robertson 3–2 (England) Andrew Higginson
  - (England) Stephen Lee 0–3 (England) Martin Gould

==== Quarter-finals ====
- Saturday, 25 September – 13:00
  - (Wales) Mark Williams 3–2 (China) Ding Junhui
  - (England) Peter Ebdon 3–1 (England) Martin Gould
- Saturday, 25 September – 19:00
  - (England) Ronnie O'Sullivan 3–1 (Scotland) Stephen Maguire
  - (England) Ricky Walden 1–3 (Australia) Neil Robertson

==== Semi-finals ====
- Sunday, 26 September – 14:00
  - (England) Peter Ebdon 1–3 (England) Ronnie O'Sullivan
  - (Wales) Mark Williams 2–3 (Australia) Neil Robertson

=== Final ===
Final: Best of 9 frames. Referee: Eirian Williams. S.E.C.C., Glasgow, Scotland, 26 September 2010.
Ronnie O'Sullivan; England	1–5	Neil Robertson; Australia
51–75, 0–107 (107), 79–18 (72), 15–73 (59), 0–66 (66), 44–63
72	Highest break	107
0	Century breaks	1
1	50+ breaks	3

== Century breaks ==
=== Main stage centuries ===
- 147, 135, 116 – Ronnie O'Sullivan
- 132 – Stephen Maguire
- 129 – Fergal O'Brien
- 127 – Barry Hawkins
- 112 – Mark Williams
- 110, 109 – Ding Junhui
- 109 – Mark Selby
- 107, 103, 101 – Neil Robertson
- 107 – Liu Song
- 102 – Ricky Walden

=== Qualifying stage centuries ===
- 139 – Joe Swail
- 122 – Mark Davis
- 115 – Thepchaiya Un-Nooh
- 113 – Fergal O'Brien
- 113 – James McBain
- 108 – Anthony McGill
- 108 – Judd Trump
- 108 – Mark Allen
- 105 – Jamie Cope
- 104 – Liu Song
- 104 – Matthew Stevens
- 103 – Ricky Walden
- 101 – David Morris
