= Anna Prisjažņuka =

Latvian cue sports player

Personal information
- Born: 21 May 1990 (age 36) Latvia

Pool career
- Country: Latvia
- Pool games: Snooker, Ten-ball, Straight pool

Anna Prisjažņuka (born 21 May 1990) is a Latvian amateur snooker and pool player. She won the EBSA European Snooker Championship in 2023 and 2025 and was runner-up in 2017 and 2023.

== Career ==
Prisjažņuka was runner-up at the 2017 Women's EBSA European Snooker Championship, winning the first frame of the final against Wendy Jans before losing the match 1–5. In 2023 she defeated Jans in the deciding frame of the final to win the 2023 Women's EBSA European Snooker Championship.

At the 2019 European Snooker Championship, Anastasia Nechaeva beat Prisjažņuka 4–2 in the semi-final.

Prisjažņuka and Tatjana Vasiljeva were runners-up in the 2016 Ladies European Team Snooker Championship, losing 1–4 to the Russia 1 team of Anastasia Nechaeva and Daria Sirotina in the final.

She regained the European title in 2025 with a deciding frame defeat of Kenna.

== Notable results ==
=== European Championship (snooker) ===
Outcome	Year	Venue	Opponent	Score	Ref.
Runner-up	2017	Shengjin, Albania	(Belgium) Wendy Jans	1–5	
Winner	2023	Albena, Bulgaria	(Belgium) Wendy Jans	4–3	
Runner-up	2024	Albufeira, Portugal	(England) Rebecca Kenna	1–4	
Winner	2025	Golem, Albania	(England) Rebecca Kenna	4–3	

=== European Championship (pool) ===
Source: Kozoom

- 2015 Ten-ball European Championship (Women) - ranked 33rd
- 2018 Straight pool European Championship (Women) - ranked 17th
- 2018 Ten-ball European Championship (Women) - ranked 17th
- 2018 Straight pool European Championship (Women) - ranked 17th
