= Isabelle Jonckheere =

Belgian snooker player

Sport
- Country: Belgium
- Sport: Snooker

Isabelle Jonckheere is a Belgian amateur snooker player. She was runner-up to Wendy Jans at the 2006 EBSA European Snooker Championship for women.

She has won the Belgian national women's snooker title three times, in 2005, 2006 and 2011.

== Biography ==
Jonckheere is from Bruges. In May 2010, she finished runner-up at the Belgian women's snooker championship in Mol, losing 0–4 to Wendy Jans in the final.

At the 2007 IBSF World Snooker Championship in Korat, Thailand, Jonckheere reached the women's quarter-finals after defeating Anuja Chandra 4–1 in the last 16. She faced defending champion Jans in the quarter-finals and led 3–2 before losing 3–4.

== Career highlights ==
=== European Championship (Women) ===
Outcome	Year	Venue	Opponent	Score	Ref.
Runner-up	2006	Constanța, Romania	(Belgium) Wendy Jans	0–5	

=== Team competitions ===
Outcome	Year	Championship	Opponents	Score	Ref.
Winner	2007	European Team Championship, with Wendy Jans (Belgium 1)	Hanna Mergies and Malgorzta Klys (Poland)	5–0	

=== BBSA Belgian National Championship (Women's) ===
Outcome	No.	Year	Opponent	Score	Ref.
Runner-up		2003	Wendy Jans	0–4	
Winner		2005	Cathy Dehaene	4–1	
Winner		2006	Cathy Dehaene	4–1	
Runner-up		2009	Wendy Jans	1–4	
Runner-up		2010	Wendy Jans	0–4	
Winner		2011	Wendy Jans	4–0	
