= European Tour 2013/2014 – Event 4 =

European Tour 2013/2014 Event 4

Tournament information
- Dates: 22–25 August 2013
- Venue: Stadthalle
- City: Fürth
- Country: Germany
- Organisation: World Snooker
- Format: Minor-ranking event
- Total prize fund: €125,000
- Winner's share: €25,000
- Highest break: Ian Burns (ENG) (133); Ricky Walden (ENG) (133)

Final
- Champion: Ronnie O'Sullivan (ENG)
- Runner-up: Gerard Greene (NIR)
- Score: 4–0

The European Tour 2013/2014 – Event 4 (also known as the 2013 Arcaden Paul Hunter Classic) was a professional minor-ranking snooker tournament that took place between 22 and 25 August 2013 in Fürth, Germany.

Mark Selby was the defending champion, but he lost 2–4 against Ronnie O'Sullivan in the semi-finals.

O'Sullivan won his 51st professional title by defeating Gerard Greene 4–0 in the final. Greene reached his first final at an event carrying ranking points.

== Prize fund and ranking points ==
The breakdown of prize money and ranking points of the event is shown below:

	Prize fund	Ranking points^{1}
Winner	€25,000	2,000
Runner-up	€12,000	1,600
Semi-finalist	€6,000	1,280
Quarter-finalist	€4,000	1,000
Last 16	€2,300	760
Last 32	€1,200	560
Last 64	€700	360
Total	€125,000	–

- ^{1} Only professional players can earn ranking points.

== Main draw ==
=== Preliminary rounds ===
==== Round 1 ====
Best of 7 frames

(Switzerland) Sebastian Lahruis	0–4	(Belgium) Olivier Vandenboheede

(England) Zack Richardson	4–0	(Switzerland) Max Kribbe

==== Round 2 ====
Best of 7 frames

(Belgium) Kevin Vandevoort	w/o–w/d	(Republic of Ireland) John Sutton
(Germany) Peter Wagner	4–0	(Germany) Carl Rosenberger
(Turkey) Ali Kirim	0–4	(England) Saqib Nasir
(Germany) Andreas Hartung	4–2	(Norway) Anita Maflin
(England) Gary Steele	0–4	(England) Sanderson Lam
(Switzerland) Martin Spiess	w/d–w/o	(Germany) Daniel Dieudonne
(Germany) Fabian Tost	1–4	(England) Michael Wild
(England) Ian Glover	4–0	(Wales) Hannah Jones
(England) Matthew Day	4–1	(England) Henry Roper
(Republic of Ireland) Joe Delaney	w/d–w/o	(Croatia) Sanjin Kusan
(Germany) Florian Werres	2–4	(England) Ryan Causton
(Belgium) Jeff Jacobs	2–4	(Belgium) Alain Van Der Steen
(Germany) Diana Schuler	0–4	(Belgium) Olivier Vandenboheede
(Scotland) Ross Higgins	4–0	(Germany) Tobias Renner
(Netherlands) Laurin Winters	0–4	(England) Daniel Ward
(England) Adam Edge	w/o–n/s	(Germany) Bernd Strnad
(Belgium) Jurian Heusdens	4–1	(Wales) Jimmy Carney
(England) Sam Harvey	4–0	(Italy) Angelo Rizzo
(Germany) Norbert Hofheinz	0–4	(Germany) Phil Barnes
(Germany) Ronny Pawlitza	0–4	(England) Oliver Lines
(Germany) Ronny Buckholz	0–4	(Belgium) Mathijs Bokken
(Germany) Gerhard Engelschalk	1–4	(England) Sydney Wilson
(Austria) Dominik Scherübl	4–2	(France) Stéphane Ochoïski
(Germany) Stefan Caspers	1–4	(Switzerland) Pascal Camenzind
(Germany) Kilian Bauer-Pantoulier	4–0	(Italy) Michele Battaglia
(Scotland) Marc Davis	4–0	(Germany) Ralph Müller
(Belgium) Kevin Van Hove	4–0	(Germany) Nicole Breitenstein
(Germany) Jan Eisenstein	1–4	(Wales) Ben Jones

(Germany) Jan Leichs	0–4	(Belgium) Wan Chooi Tan
(Wales) Jack Bradford	4–0	(Austria) Benjamin Buser
(Austria) Rick Kraaijeveld	0–4	(Germany) Stefan Schenk
(Germany) Christian Rauscher	w/o–n/s	Marianyela Palacios
(Germany) Sebastian Thron	w/o–w/d	(England) Mark Vincent
(Germany) Ralf Günzel	0–4	(England) Zack Richardson
(Germany) Oliver Kremp	0–4	(England) Darren Cook
(Germany) Stefan Gerst	3–4	(Germany) Luca Kaufmann
(England) Sean Hopkin	0–4	(England) Oliver Brown
(Germany) Oliver Metzger	2–4	(Germany) Thomas Blang
(Australia) Ryan Thomerson	3–4	(England) Damian Wilks
(Wales) Gareth Allen	3–4	(Wales) Kishan Hirani
(Germany) Roman Dietzel	0–4	(Norway) Christopher Watts
(Germany) Matthias Porn	0–4	(England) Joe Steele
(Germany) Matthias Leuthold	0–4	(Germany) Daniel Schneider
(England) Steven Hallworth	4–0	(Germany) Thomas Kiesewetter
(England) Christopher Keogan	2–4	(England) Charlie Walters
(England) Thomas Wealthy	4–0	(Germany) Ralf Hemmerling
(Germany) Adrian Schmidt	w/o–n/s	(Portugal) Filipe Cardoso
(Germany) Tobias Hirmer	1–4	(England) Joe Roberts
(Germany) Tobias Stelter	0–4	(England) Ashley Carty
(England) Ben Harrison	w/d–w/o	(India) David Singh
(Germany) Lukas Kleckers	4–0	(Austria) Andreas Ploner
(Germany) Moritz Thomas	0–4	(Northern Ireland) Jordan Brown
(Scotland) David Frew	0–4	(Germany) Stefan Schneider
(Turkey) Soner Sari	2–4	(Belgium) Hans Blanckaert
(Wales) Jamie Clarke	4–1	(Belgium) Tomasz Skalski
(England) Reanne Evans	0–4	(England) Martin Ball

==== Round 3 ====
Best of 7 frames

(Belgium) Kevin Vandevoort	3–4	(Germany) Peter Wagner
(England) Saqib Nasir	4–0	(Germany) Andreas Hartung
(England) Sanderson Lam	4–0	(Germany) Daniel Dieudonne
(England) Michael Wild	0–4	(England) Ian Glover
(England) Matthew Day	4–0	(Croatia) Sanjin Kusan
(England) Ryan Causton	4–1	(Belgium) Alain Van Der Steen
(Belgium) Olivier Vandenboheede	4–2	(Scotland) Ross Higgins
(England) Daniel Ward	4–3	(England) Adam Edge
(Belgium) Jurian Heusdens	4–3	(England) Sam Harvey
(Germany) Phil Barnes	1–4	(England) Oliver Lines
(Belgium) Mathijs Bokken	0–4	(England) Sydney Wilson
(Austria) Dominik Scherübl	4–1	(Switzerland) Pascal Camenzind
(Germany) Kilian Bauer-Pantoulier	1–4	(Scotland) Marc Davis
(Belgium) Kevin Van Hove	1–4	(Wales) Ben Jones

(Belgium) Wan Chooi Tan	4–3	(Wales) Jack Bradford
(Germany) Stefan Schenk	4–3	(Germany) Christian Rauscher
(Germany) Sebastian Thron	0–4	(England) Zack Richardson
(England) Darren Cook	4–1	(Germany) Luca Kaufmann
(England) Oliver Brown	4–0	(Germany) Thomas Blang
(England) Damian Wilks	0–4	(Wales) Kishan Hirani
(Norway) Christopher Watts	0–4	(England) Joe Steele
(Germany) Daniel Schneider	2–4	(England) Steven Hallworth
(England) Charlie Walters	4–1	(England) Thomas Wealthy
(Germany) Adrian Schmidt	0–4	(England) Joe Roberts
(England) Ashley Carty	3–4	(India) David Singh
(Germany) Lukas Kleckers	4–2	(Northern Ireland) Jordan Brown
(Germany) Stefan Schneider	0–4	(Belgium) Hans Blanckaert
(Wales) Jamie Clarke	4–1	(England) Martin Ball

==== Round 4 ====
Best of 7 frames

(Germany) Peter Wagner	0–4	(England) Saqib Nasir
(England) Sanderson Lam	0–4	(England) Ian Glover
(England) Matthew Day	4–3	(England) Ryan Causton
(Belgium) Olivier Vandenboheede	1–4	(England) Daniel Ward
(Belgium) Jurian Heusdens	0–4	(England) Oliver Lines
(England) Sydney Wilson	4–0	(Austria) Dominik Scherübl
(Scotland) Marc Davis	1–4	(Wales) Ben Jones

(Belgium) Wan Chooi Tan	4–1	(Germany) Stefan Schenk
(England) Zack Richardson	1–4	(England) Darren Cook
(England) Oliver Brown	2–4	(Wales) Kishan Hirani
(England) Joe Steele	1–4	(England) Steven Hallworth
(England) Charlie Walters	4–3	(England) Joe Roberts
(India) David Singh	4–1	(Germany) Lukas Kleckers
(Belgium) Hans Blanckaert	0–4	(Wales) Jamie Clarke

=== Main rounds ===
==== Top half ====
===== Section 1 =====
Last 128; Best of 7 frames
(Wales) Mark Williams	w/d
(England) Saqib Nasir	w/o
(England) Stuart Bingham	4
(Scotland) Fraser Patrick	1
(England) Mark Davis	4
(Northern Ireland) Mark Allen	3
(England) Jamie Cope	3
(England) Steve Davis	4
(England) Sean O'Sullivan	4
(Thailand) Passakorn Suwannawat	1
(England) David Grace	3
(Republic of Ireland) David Morris	4
(England) Judd Trump	4
(England) Ian Glover	1
(Scotland) Graeme Dott	4
(England) Matthew Day	2

Last 64; Best of 7 frames
(England) Saqib Nasir	3
(England) Stuart Bingham	4
(England) Mark Davis	4
(England) Steve Davis	2
(England) Sean O'Sullivan	2
(Republic of Ireland) David Morris	4
(England) Judd Trump	4
(Scotland) Graeme Dott	2

Last 32; Best of 7 frames
(England) Stuart Bingham	4
(England) Mark Davis	2
(Republic of Ireland) David Morris	4
(England) Judd Trump	2

Last 16; Best of 7 frames
(England) Stuart Bingham	4
(Republic of Ireland) David Morris	1

===== Section 2 =====
Last 128; Best of 7 frames
(England) Chris Wakelin	4
(England) Daniel Ward	1
(England) Ronnie O'Sullivan	4
(Qatar) Ahmed Saif	0
(England) Barry Pinches	0
(England) Alex Davies	4
(England) Stuart Carrington	4
(England) Oliver Lines	2
(Scotland) Anthony McGill	4
(England) Sydney Wilson	2
(England) Liam Highfield	2
(England) Peter Lines	4
(England) Matthew Selt	4
(England) Craig Steadman	1
(Wales) Daniel Wells	4
(Wales) Andrew Pagett	1

Last 64; Best of 7 frames
(England) Chris Wakelin	1
(England) Ronnie O'Sullivan	4
(England) Alex Davies	4
(England) Stuart Carrington	1
(Scotland) Anthony McGill	4
(England) Peter Lines	2
(England) Matthew Selt	3
(Wales) Daniel Wells	4

Last 32; Best of 7 frames
(England) Ronnie O'Sullivan	4
(England) Alex Davies	0
(Scotland) Anthony McGill	4
(Wales) Daniel Wells	1

Last 16; Best of 7 frames
(England) Ronnie O'Sullivan	4
(Scotland) Anthony McGill	3

===== Section 3 =====
Last 128; Best of 7 frames
(Germany) Patrick Einsle	3
(Thailand) Dechawat Poomjaeng	4
(England) Robert Milkins	4
(Thailand) James Wattana	1
(England) Mike Dunn	w/d
(Hong Kong) Marco Fu	w/o
(England) Joel Walker	w/o
(Scotland) Jamie Burnett	w/d
(Wales) Matthew Stevens	3
(Wales) Ben Jones	4
(England) Martin Gould	4
(England) Jimmy White	1
(England) Jimmy Robertson	4
(Belgium) Wan Chooi Tan	0
(England) Tom Ford	4
(England) Chris Norbury	2

Last 64; Best of 7 frames
(Thailand) Dechawat Poomjaeng	0
(England) Robert Milkins	4
(Hong Kong) Marco Fu	4
(England) Joel Walker	1
(Wales) Ben Jones	0
(England) Martin Gould	4
(England) Jimmy Robertson	4
(England) Tom Ford	1

Last 32; Best of 7 frames
(England) Robert Milkins	4
(Hong Kong) Marco Fu	3
(England) Martin Gould	4
(England) Jimmy Robertson	2

Last 16; Best of 7 frames
(England) Robert Milkins	4
(England) Martin Gould	1

===== Section 4 =====
Last 128; Best of 7 frames
(Malta) Tony Drago	0
(India) Aditya Mehta	4
(Scotland) Alan McManus	4
(Egypt) Mohamed Khairy	0
(England) Gary Wilson	4
(Thailand) Noppon Saengkham	0
(England) Anthony Hamilton	4
(Thailand) Ratchayothin Yotharuck	2
(England) Martin O'Donnell	4
(England) Darren Cook	3
(Scotland) Michael Leslie	4
(Australia) Vinnie Calabrese	1
(England) Mark Selby	4
(China) Tian Pengfei	2
(England) Rod Lawler	4
(England) Adam Duffy	1

Last 64; Best of 7 frames
(India) Aditya Mehta	4
(Scotland) Alan McManus	0
(England) Gary Wilson	0
(England) Anthony Hamilton	4
(England) Martin O'Donnell	4
(Scotland) Michael Leslie	1
(England) Mark Selby	4
(England) Rod Lawler	1

Last 32; Best of 7 frames
(India) Aditya Mehta	4
(England) Anthony Hamilton	2
(England) Martin O'Donnell	3
(England) Mark Selby	4

Last 16; Best of 7 frames
(India) Aditya Mehta	1
(England) Mark Selby	4

==== Bottom half ====
===== Section 5 =====
Last 128; Best of 7 frames
(Australia) Neil Robertson	0
(Thailand) Thepchaiya Un-Nooh	4
(England) Andrew Norman	4
(England) Rory McLeod	2
(England) Robbie Williams	4
(Scotland) Ross Muir	2
(Northern Ireland) Joe Swail	4
(Wales) Kishan Hirani	1
(India) Pankaj Advani	4
(England) Allan Taylor	0
(Wales) Jamie Jones	4
(China) Lyu Haotian	2
(England) Shaun Murphy	4
(Malta) Alex Borg	1
(England) Kyren Wilson	w/o
(Finland) Robin Hull	w/d

Last 64; Best of 7 frames
(Thailand) Thepchaiya Un-Nooh	2
(England) Andrew Norman	4
(England) Robbie Williams	2
(Northern Ireland) Joe Swail	4
(India) Pankaj Advani	2
(Wales) Jamie Jones	4
(England) Shaun Murphy	1
(England) Kyren Wilson	4

Last 32; Best of 7 frames
(England) Andrew Norman	3
(Northern Ireland) Joe Swail	4
(Wales) Jamie Jones	4
(England) Kyren Wilson	1

Last 16; Best of 7 frames
(Northern Ireland) Joe Swail	4
(Wales) Jamie Jones	2

===== Section 6 =====
Last 128; Best of 7 frames
(England) Michael Wasley	4
(England) Ryan Clark	3
(Scotland) Scott Donaldson	4
(England) Lee Page	1
(Republic of Ireland) Fergal O'Brien	3
(England) Mark Joyce	4
(England) Jamie O'Neill	2
(Thailand) Thanawat Thirapongpaiboon	4
(England) John Astley	w/o
(England) Lee Spick	w/d
(England) Barry Hawkins	w/o
(Wales) Jak Jones	w/d
(England) Jack Lisowski	3
(Northern Ireland) Gerard Greene	4
(Wales) Dominic Dale	4
(Switzerland) Alexander Ursenbacher	1

Last 64; Best of 7 frames
(England) Michael Wasley	4
(Scotland) Scott Donaldson	3
(England) Mark Joyce	2
(Thailand) Thanawat Thirapongpaiboon	4
(England) John Astley	4
(England) Barry Hawkins	3
(Northern Ireland) Gerard Greene	4
(Wales) Dominic Dale	3

Last 32; Best of 7 frames
(England) Michael Wasley	2
(Thailand) Thanawat Thirapongpaiboon	4
(England) John Astley	2
(Northern Ireland) Gerard Greene	4

Last 16; Best of 7 frames
(Thailand) Thanawat Thirapongpaiboon	1
(Northern Ireland) Gerard Greene	4

===== Section 7 =====
Last 128; Best of 7 frames
(England) Joe Perry	3
(Republic of Ireland) Ken Doherty	4
(Norway) Kurt Maflin	4
(England) Steven Hallworth	3
(England) Alfie Burden	4
(England) Elliot Slessor	1
(England) David Gilbert	4
(China) Ding Junhui	1
(Belgium) Luca Brecel	4
(England) Paul Davison	2
(Scotland) Stephen Maguire	2
(Wales) Michael White	4
(Scotland) Marcus Campbell	2
(England) Andrew Higginson	4
(England) Sam Baird	4
(China) Liu Chuang	2

Last 64; Best of 7 frames
(Republic of Ireland) Ken Doherty	4
(Norway) Kurt Maflin	2
(England) Alfie Burden	4
(England) David Gilbert	2
(Belgium) Luca Brecel	3
(Wales) Michael White	4
(England) Andrew Higginson	1
(England) Sam Baird	4

Last 32; Best of 7 frames
(Republic of Ireland) Ken Doherty	4
(England) Alfie Burden	3
(Wales) Michael White	4
(England) Sam Baird	2

Last 16; Best of 7 frames
(Republic of Ireland) Ken Doherty	2
(Wales) Michael White	4

===== Section 8 =====
Last 128; Best of 7 frames
(Wales) Ryan Day	0
(England) Ali Carter	4
(England) Ian Burns	4
(England) Charlie Walters	2
(England) Ben Woollaston	4
(China) Cao Yupeng	1
(England) Nigel Bond	2
(England) James Cahill	4
(England) Michael Holt	4
(India) David Singh	0
(England) Ricky Walden	4
(Wales) Jamie Clarke	1
(England) Hammad Miah	2
(China) Xiao Guodong	4
(Scotland) John Higgins	0
(England) Mark King	4

Last 64; Best of 7 frames
(England) Ali Carter	4
(England) Ian Burns	3
(England) Ben Woollaston	2
(England) James Cahill	4
(England) Michael Holt	0
(England) Ricky Walden	4
(China) Xiao Guodong	3
(England) Mark King	4

Last 32; Best of 7 frames
(England) Ali Carter	4
(England) James Cahill	2
(England) Ricky Walden	4
(England) Mark King	3

Last 16; Best of 7 frames
(England) Ali Carter	4
(England) Ricky Walden	2

==== Finals ====
Quarter-finals; Best of 7 frames		Semi-finals; Best of 7 frames		Final; Best of 7 frames
(England) Stuart Bingham	0
(England) Ronnie O'Sullivan	4	(England) Ronnie O'Sullivan	4
(England) Robert Milkins	2	(England) Mark Selby	2
(England) Mark Selby	4			(England) Ronnie O'Sullivan	4
(Northern Ireland) Joe Swail	1			(Northern Ireland) Gerard Greene	0
(Northern Ireland) Gerard Greene	4	(Northern Ireland) Gerard Greene	4
(Wales) Michael White	3	(England) Ali Carter	3
(England) Ali Carter	4

== Century breaks ==
- 133, 116 – Ricky Walden
- 133, 108 – Ian Burns
- 127 – Oliver Brown
- 126 – Thepchaiya Un-Nooh
- 123 – Darren Cook
- 122 – Stuart Bingham
- 121 – Kurt Maflin
- 119, 104 – Michael White
- 118 – Mark Selby
- 116, 101 – Joe Swail
- 111 – Anthony McGill
- 110 – Ronnie O'Sullivan
- 108 – Marcus Campbell
- 104 – Alfie Burden
- 103 – David Grace
- 103 – Alan McManus
- 103 – David Gilbert
- 102, 100 – Ali Carter
- 101, 101 – Martin Gould
- 101 – Jamie Clarke
- 101 – Fergal O'Brien
- 100 – Ashley Carty
- 100 – Marco Fu
- 100 – Mark Joyce
- 100 – Gerard Greene
- 100 – Sam Baird
