= IBSF World Snooker Championship =

Snooker tournament

- Status: Active
- Genre: Sports Event
- Date: Midyear
- Frequency: Annual
- Inaugurated: 1963 (M) / 2003 (W)
- Most recent: 2026
- Organiser: IBSF

The IBSF World Snooker Championship (also known as the World Amateur Snooker Championship) is the premier non-professional snooker tournament in the world. The event series is sanctioned by the International Billiards and Snooker Federation. A number of IBSF champions have gone on to successful careers in the professional ranks, notably Jimmy White (1980), James Wattana (1988), Ken Doherty (1989), Stuart Bingham (1996), Marco Fu (1997), Stephen Maguire (2000) and Mark Allen (2004). Both Doherty (in 1997) and Bingham (in 2015) have gone on to win the professional World Snooker Championship.

== History ==
The IBSF World Snooker Championship tournament was first held in 1963. In the first two tournaments, the title was decided alone on group stages. From 1968 until now, the group stage was followed by a knock-out stage. The tournament has been held annually since 1984.

However, 2005 IBSF World Snooker Championship was cancelled, due to an earthquake in Pakistan where the event was due to be held. Instead in February/March 2006, a new tournament with the name IBSF World Grand Prix was held in Prestatyn, Wales as the qualification for a place on 2006/2007 World Snooker Main Tour, although the winner wasn't called World Champion.

In 2007 an all-Thailand final saw Atthasit Mahitthi defeat Passakorn Suwannawat 11–7. At the 2008 championship in Wels, Austria, Thepchaiya Un-Nooh of Thailand defeated Ireland's Colm Gilcreest 11–7. The 2009 event was held in Hyderabad, India, and won by Alfie Burden of England, 10–8 against Igor Figueiredo of Brazil. The 2010 event was held in Damascus, Syria, and won by Dechawat Poomjaeng of Thailand, defeating India's Pankaj Advani. The 2011 Championship was held from November 28 to December 3 in Bangalore, India. The final was won by 17-year-old Iranian Hossein Vafaei, defeating Lee Walker of Wales 10–9. In 2014, fourteen-year-old Yan Bingtao beat Pakistan's Muhammad Sajjad 8–7 to become the youngest ever world champion in snooker.

== Results ==
=== Men ===
#	Year	Venue	Winner	Runner-up	Score	Ref.
1	1963	Kolkata, India	(Wales) Gary Owen	(Australia) Frank Harris	– (Note: Title decided alone on group stage)	
2	1966	Karachi, Pakistan	(Wales) Gary Owen	(England) John Spencer	–	
3	1968	Sydney, Australia	(England) David Taylor	(Australia) Max Williams	8–7	
4	1970	Edinburgh, Scotland	(England) Jonathan Barron	(England) Sid Hood	11–7	
5	1972	Cardiff, Wales	(England) Ray Edmonds	(South Africa) Manuel Francisco	11–10	
6	1974	Dublin, Ireland	(England) Ray Edmonds	(Wales) Geoff Thomas	11–9	
7	1976	Johannesburg, South Africa	(Wales) Doug Mountjoy	(Malta) Paul Mifsud	11–1	
8	1978	Rabat, Malta	(Wales) Cliff Wilson	(England) Joe Johnson	11–5	
9	1980	Launceston, Australia	(England) Jimmy White	(Australia) Ron Atkins	11–2	
10	1982	Calgary, Canada	(Wales) Terry Parsons	(Canada) Jim Bear	11–8	
11	1984	Dublin, Ireland	(India) Omprakesh Agrawal	(Wales) Terry Parsons	11–7	
12	1985	Blackpool, England	(Malta) Paul Mifsud	(Wales) Dilwyn John	11–6	
13	1986	Invercargill, New Zealand	(Malta) Paul Mifsud	(Wales) Kerry Jones	11–9	
14	1987	Bangalore, India	(Wales) Darren Morgan	(Malta) Joe Grech	11–4	
15	1988	Sydney, Australia	(Thailand) James Wattana	(England) Barry Pinches	11–8	
16	1989	Singapore	(Republic of Ireland) Ken Doherty	(England) Jon Birch	11–2	
17	1990	Colombo, Sri Lanka	(Republic of Ireland) Stephen O'Connor	(Belgium) Steve Lemmens	11–8	
18	1991	Bangkok, Thailand	(Thailand) Noppadon Noppachorn	(Wales) Dominic Dale	11–8	
19	1992	Malta	(England) Neil Mosley	(Philippines) Leonardo Andam	11–2	
20	1993	Karachi, Pakistan	(Thailand) Chuchart Triritanapradit	(Thailand) Praput Chaithanasakun	11–6	
21	1994	Johannesburg, South Africa	(Pakistan) Mohammed Yousuf	(Iceland) Johannes R. Johannesson	11–9	
22	1995	Bristol, England	(Thailand) Sakchai Sim-Ngam	(England) David Lilley	11–7	
23	1996	New Plymouth, New Zealand	(England) Stuart Bingham	(Australia) Stan Gorski	11–5	
24	1997	Bulawayo, Zimbabwe	(Hong Kong) Marco Fu	(England) Stuart Bingham	11–10	
25	1998	Guangzhou, China	(England) Luke Simmonds	(Wales) Ryan Day	11–10	
26	1999	Port Moresby, Papua New Guinea	(Wales) Ian Preece	(England) David Lilley	11–8	
27	2000	Changchun, China	(Scotland) Stephen Maguire	(England) Luke Fisher	11–5	
28	2002	Cairo, Egypt	(Australia) Steve Mifsud	(Wales) Tim English	11–6	
29	2003	Jiangmen, China	(India) Pankaj Advani	(Pakistan) Saleh Mohammad	11–5	
30	2004	Veldhoven, Netherlands	(Northern Ireland) Mark Allen	(Australia) Steve Mifsud	11–6	
–	2006	Prestatyn, Wales	(Wales) Michael White	(Scotland) Mark Boyle	11–5	
31	2006	Amman, Jordan	(Norway) Kurt Maflin	(England) Daniel Ward	11–8	
32	2007	Korat, Thailand	(Thailand) Atthasit Mahitthi	(Thailand) Passakorn Suwannawat	11–7	
33	2008	Wels, Austria	(Thailand) Thepchaiya Un-Nooh	(Republic of Ireland) Colm Gilcreest	11–7	
34	2009	Hyderabad, India	(England) Alfie Burden	(Brazil) Igor Figueiredo	10–8	
35	2010	Damascus, Syria	(Thailand) Dechawat Poomjaeng	(India) Pankaj Advani	10–7	
36	2011	Bangalore, India	(Iran) Hossein Vafaei	(Wales) Lee Walker	10–9	
37	2012	Sofia, Bulgaria	(Pakistan) Muhammad Asif	(England) Gary Wilson	10–8	
38	2013	Daugavpils, Latvia	(China) Zhou Yuelong	(China) Zhao Xintong	8–4	
39	2014	Bangalore, India	(China) Yan Bingtao	(Pakistan) Muhammad Sajjad	8–7	
40	2015	Hurghada, Egypt	(India) Pankaj Advani	(China) Zhao Xintong	8–6	
41	2016	Doha, Qatar	(Iran) Soheil Vahedi	(Wales) Andrew Pagett	8–1	
42	2017	Doha, Qatar	(India) Pankaj Advani	(Iran) Amir Sarkhosh	8–2	
43	2018	Yangon, Myanmar	(China) Chang Bingyu	(China) He Guoqiang	8–3	
44	2019	Antalya, Turkey	(Pakistan) Muhammad Asif	(Philippines) Jefrey Roda	8–5	
45	2021	Doha, Qatar	(Pakistan) Ahsan Ramzan	(Iran) Amir Sarkhosh	6–5	
46	2022	Antalya, Turkey	(Malaysia) Lim Kok Leong	(Iran) Amir Sarkhosh	5–0	
47	2023	Doha, Qatar	(Qatar) Ali Alobaidli	(Hong Kong) Cheung Ka Wai	6–1	
48	2024	Doha, Qatar	(Pakistan) Muhammad Asif	(Iran) Ali Gharahgozlou	5–3	
49	2025	Doha, Qatar	(Poland) Michał Szubarczyk	(Qatar) Ali Alobaidli	5–2	
50	2026	Indore, India	(Iran) Ali Gharahgozlou	(Hong Kong) Yun Fung Tam	5–1	

=== Women ===
#	Year	Venue	Winner	Runner-up	Score	Ref.
1	2003	Jiangmen, China	(England) Kelly Fisher	(Belgium) Wendy Jans	5–2	
2	2004	Veldhoven, Netherlands	(England) Reanne Evans	(Belgium) Wendy Jans	5–1	
3	2006	Amman, Jordan	(Belgium) Wendy Jans	(Hong Kong) Jaique Ip	5–0	
4	2007	Korat, Thailand	(England) Reanne Evans	(Belgium) Wendy Jans	5–0	
5	2008	Wels, Austria	(England) Reanne Evans	(Belgium) Wendy Jans	5–3	
6	2009	Hyderabad, India	(Hong Kong) Ng On-yee	(Australia) Kathy Parashis	5–1	
7	2010	Damascus, Syria	(Hong Kong) Ng On-yee	(Hong Kong) Jaique Ip	5–0	
8	2012	Sofia, Bulgaria	(Belgium) Wendy Jans	(Hong Kong) Ng On-yee	5–1	
9	2013	Daugavpils, Latvia	(Belgium) Wendy Jans	(China) Shi Chunxia	5–3	
10	2014	Bangalore, India	(Belgium) Wendy Jans	(Russia) Anastasia Nechaeva	5–2	
11	2015	Hurghada, Egypt	(Belgium) Wendy Jans	(Russia) Anastasia Nechaeva	5–1	
12	2016	Doha, Qatar	(Belgium) Wendy Jans	(India) Amee Kamani	5–0	
13	2017	Doha, Qatar	(Belgium) Wendy Jans	(Thailand) Waratthanun Sukritthanes	5–2	
14	2018	Yangon, Myanmar	(Thailand) Waratthanun Sukritthanes	(Belgium) Wendy Jans	5–2	
15	2019	Antalya, Turkey	(Hong Kong) Ng On-yee	(Thailand) Nutcharut Wongharuthai	5–2	
16	2021	Doha, Qatar	(Belgium) Wendy Jans	(Thailand) Nutcharut Wongharuthai	4–1	
17	2022	Antalya, Turkey	(Belgium) Wendy Jans	(India) Vidya Pillai	4–3	
18	2023	Doha, Qatar	(China) Bai Yulu	(Hong Kong) Ng On-yee	4–0	
19	2024	Doha, Qatar	(Thailand) Ploychompoo Laokiatphong	(Hong Kong) Ng On-yee	3–2	
20	2025	Doha, Qatar	(India) Anupama Ramachandran	(Hong Kong) Ng On-yee	3–2	
21	2026	Indore, India	(India) Anupama Ramachandran	(Hong Kong) So Man Yan	3–1	

== See also ==
- IBSF World Under-21 Snooker Championship
- IBSF World Under-17 Snooker Championship
- IBSF World Under-16 Snooker Championship
- WSF Championship
- World Snooker Tour
- World Snooker Championship
- World Women's Snooker Championship
- World Cup (snooker)
- Six-red World Championship
