= Anita Rizzuti =

Norwegian snooker player

Personal information
- Born: 12 January 1971 (age 55) Oslo, Norway

Sport
- Country: Norway
- Sport: Snooker

Anita Rizzuti (born 12 January 1971), also known as Anita Maflin and formerly Anita Andresen, is a Norwegian snooker and pool player. She is married to former professional snooker player Kurt Maflin.

== Career ==
Rizzuti was a semi-finalist at the inaugural EBSA European Women's Championship in 1996, losing 0–5 to Karen Corr. She reached the semi-finals again in 2001, losing 1–4 to Kelly Fisher and was a quarter-finalist in 1999, 2004 and 2006.

Rizzuti, Reanne Evans and Wendy Jans all took part in the 2010 World Open. Jans lost 0–3 to Alfie Burden in the first round.

In the European Tour 2013/2014 – Event 4, Maflin lost 2–4 to Andreas Hartung. At European Tour 2013/2014 – Event 8, she lost 0–4 to Joe Steele, and at European Tour 2014/2015 – Event 1 she lost 0–4 to Anthony Jeffers. At European Tour 2015/2016 – Event 1 she lost 0–4 to Simon Dent.

Rizzuti and Reanne Evans lost 1–3 to Ng On-yee and So Man Yan in the final of the 2014 WLBS World Ladies Pairs Championship.

She is married to professional snooker player Kurt Maflin. They represented Norway at the 2015 World Cup.

== Career highlights ==
Source:European Billiards & Snooker Association (results to 2002)

- 1996 EBSA European Snooker Championship Ladies' semi-finalist
- 1997 Norwegian Cup 2nd place
- 1999 EBSA European Snooker Championship Ladies' quarter-finalist
- 2000 Nordic Ladies Champion
- 2000 Norway Ladies Champion
- 2001 EBSA European Snooker Championship Ladies' semi-finalist
- 2002 Nordic Cup Ladies Champion
- 2002 Norway Ladies Champion
- 2004 EBSA European Snooker Championship Ladies' quarter-finalist
- 2006 EBSA European Snooker Championship Ladies' quarter-finalist
- 2006 IBSF World Snooker Championship quarter-finalist
- 2014 WLBS World Ladies Pairs Championship runner-up, with Reanne Evans
