= 1974 World Amateur Snooker Championship =

Tournament information
- Dates: 1–16 December 1974
- City: Dublin
- Country: Ireland
- Organisation: Billiards and Snooker Control Council, International Billiards and Snooker Federation
- Format: Round-robin and knockout
- Highest break: Alwyn Lloyd (WAL), 104

Final
- Champion: Ray Edmonds (ENG)
- Runner-up: Geoff Thomas (WAL)
- Score: 11–9

The 1974 World Amateur Snooker Championship was the sixth edition of the tournament that later became known as the IBSF World Snooker Championship. The 1974 tournament was played in Dublin from 1 to 16 December 1974. Defending champion Ray Edmonds defeated Geoff Thomas 11–9 in the final to retain the title.

== Tournament summary ==
The first World Amateur Snooker Championship was held in 1963. Ray Edmonds, who won the title in 1972, was the defending champion for 1974.

The tournament was held in Dubin from 1 to 16 December 1974. There were two nine-player round-robin groups, with the top four players from each group progressing to the quarter-finals. The quarter-finals onwards were played as a knockout tournament.

Ray Edmonds played Geoff Thomas in the final, which was held on 15 and 16 December, Edmonds led 5–2 after the first session. In the next session, Thomas took a 7–6 lead before Edmonds levelled the score. In the final session, Edmonds moved into a 9–7 lead before Thomas equalised at 9–9. Edmonds won the next two frames to achieve victory at 11–9.

Alwyn Lloyd made the highest break of the tournament, 104, during the group stage.

== Qualifying groups ==
The final tables are shown below. Players in bold qualified for the next round.

Group A

Player	MW	FW	FL	Break
**Ray Edmonds (ENG)**	7	31	11	66
**Muhammad Lafir (LKA)**	6	30	19	77
**Eddie Sinclair (SCO)**	6	28	21	67
**Geoff Thomas (WAL)**	4	24	22	43
Dessie Sheehan (IRE)	4	25	24	43
Patrick Donnelly (NIR)	3	21	28	42
Shyam Shroff (IND)	3	16	26	44
Norman Stockman (NZL)	2	18	29	51
John Sklazeski (CAN)	1	18	31	79

Group B

Player	MW	FW	FL	Break
**Alwyn Lloyd (WAL)**	8	32	14	104
**Winston Hill (NZL)**	5	26	21	58
**Pascal Burke (IRE)**	4	26	20	71
**Lou Condo (AUS)**	4	26	21	53
Alfred Borg (MLT)	4	27	23	37
David Sneddon (SCO)	4	23	21	54
Arvind Savur (IND)	4	24	23	50
Roy Cowley (IOM)	3	16	27	50
N J Rahim (LKA)	0	2	32	25

== Knockout ==
Players in bold denote match winners.

**Quarter-finals**; Best of 7 frames
**Ray Edmonds (ENG)**	**4**
Lou Condo (AUS)	3
**Eddie Sinclair (SCO)**	**4**
Winston Hill (NZL)	2
**Pascal Burke (IRE)**	**4**
Muhammad Lafir (LKA)	3
**Geoff Thomas (WAL)**	**4**
Alwyn Lloyd (WAL)	2

**Semi-finals**; Best of 15 frames
**Ray Edmonds (ENG)**	**8**
Eddie Sinclair (SCO)	4
Pascal Burke (IRE)	2
**Geoff Thomas (WAL)**	**8**

**Final**; Best of 21 frames
**Ray Edmonds (ENG)**	**11**
Geoff Thomas (WAL)	9

== Final ==
Scores in bold indicate winning frame scores. *Denotes frame won on a respotted black

Final: Best of 21 frames. Dublin, 15–16 December 1974
**Ray Edmonds** (England)	**11**–9	Geoff Thomas (Wales)
15 December (evening): **107**–25; 42–**68**; **56**–46; **76**–69*; 57–**67**; **60**–37; **64**–13; 34–**58**; 16 December (afternoon): 34–**58**; **76**–24; 22–**83**; 13–**88**; 3–**90**; 28–**64**; **67**–8; 15 December (evening): **84**–10; **72**–64; 36–**76**; 46–**56**; **66**–43; **90**–27
