= Diana Stateczny =

German snooker and pool player

Personal information
- Born: 13 January 1980 (age 46) Germany

Sport
- Country: Germany
- Sport: Snooker

Diana Stateczny (born 13 January 1980) is a German amateur snooker and professional pool player. She won the women's 2019 EBSA European Snooker Championship.

== Career ==
=== Early career ===
Stateczny started playing cue sports in 1995, initially pool, but focusing on snooker from around 2009.

She was runner-up at the 2005 14.1 European Pool Championships, and won the 2007 Eight-ball European Pool Championships

=== European Snooker Championship Finals ===
At the 2010 EBSA European Snooker Championship, Stateczny won all of the matches in her qualifying group without losing a frame, and topped the qualifying table. She was therefore the top seed in the knockout, where she beat Anne-Katrin Hirsch 4–3 and Natascha Niermann 4–0 to reach the final. She lost in the final 3–5 to defending champion Wendy Jans.

Stateczny won all of her matches in qualifying for the knockout of the 2019 EBSA European Snooker Championship. She then beat Ewelina Piślewska 3–2, Polina Astakhova 4–1 and Linda Erben 4–1 to reach the final against Anastasia Nechaeva. Stateczny won the first frame of the final, before losing the next two. However, she then won the next three frames to record a 4–2 victory and win the title.

=== European Team Championships ===
Stateczny was part of the winning EBSA European Women's Team Championships in 2011, and was a losing finalist in 2015 and 2019.

== Personal life ==
She lives in Bochum, Germany, and works for Phenox, a medical technology company.

== Titles and achievements ==
Snooker

- 2020 International Billiards and Snooker Federation World Women's 6 Reds Championship runner-up, lost 3–5 to Nutcharut Wongharuthai in the final.
- 2019 European Champion
- 2019 European Team Snooker Championship Ladies runner-up (with Linda Erben)
- 2017 German champion
- 2016 German champion
- 2015 Team European Championship runner-up
- 2014 German champion
- 2013 German champion
- 2012 German champion
- 2011 German championship runner-up
- 2011 Team European Champion
- 2010 German champion
- 2010 European Championship runner-up
- 2009 German champion

Pool

- 2007 Eight-ball European Pool Champion
- 2005 14.1 runner-up European Pool Championships
- 2005 European Team Championship Ladies
- 2001 European Team Championship Ladies
