= Amee Kamani =

Indian snooker player (born 1992)

Personal information
- Born: 3 June 1992 (age 34) Indore, Madhya Pradesh, India

Sport
- Country: India
- Sport: Snooker
- Highest ranking: World Women's Snooker: 10; (2024-25)

Amee Kamani (born 3 June 1992) is an Indian snooker player. She was runner-up in the 2016 International Billiards and Snooker Federation World Snooker championship, losing 0–5 in the final to the defending champion Wendy Jans. Kamani was the 2018 Asian Billiards Sports Championships Ladies (ACBS Asian Snooker Championship) Champion after defeating Siripaporn Nuanthakhamjan 3–0 in the final, and was runner-up at the 2014 Australian Open (0–3 to Jessica Woods) and the 2019 International Billiards and Snooker Federation Women's six-reds snooker championship (2–4 against Nutcharut Wongharuthai).

She is a recipient of the Vikram award in the year 2015.

After a sporting focus on table tennis for ten years until she was 17, Kamani then took up cue sports competitively. She has won three Indian national titles at snooker and two at English billiards, and was a member of the victorious Asia women's team at the 2019 World Team Trophy, a test event for the 2024 Summer Olympics.

== Early life ==
Amee Kamani was born on 3 June 1992 in Indore, Madhya Pradesh. Her main sporting focus was on table tennis from the ages of 7 to 17. However, she lost interest in that sport in 2010 due to feeling that she was not being supported despite her successes, and might never become a top player. She played pool recreationally, and her friends suggested that she try other cue sports. She took up snooker, practicing at the Madhya Pradesh Snooker, Billiards Academy in Indore in 2011.

== Playing career ==
At her first national tournament, Kamani lost 0–2 to Varsha Sanjeev in the quarter-finals of the 2011 Indian girls' championship. In 2013, she took third place at the Indian women's six-reds championship by defeating R. Umadevi 3–0 in the playoff. The following year she was a losing semi-finalist, 1–3 to Vidya Pillai, in the women's national snooker championship, and won the third-place playoff by defeating Neeta Sanghvi 2–0. She told Daily News and Analysis that she had been practicing for five hours a day, but wanted to maintain a balance between snooker and her studies.

With Pillai partnering her, Kamani was a semi-finalist at the 2014 International Billiards and Snooker Federation (IBSF) Team Snooker Championships. At the 2014 Australian Open, held in Sydney, Kamini won all of her five matches in the qualifying round, four of them 2–0 and the other 2–1. She then beat Suniti Damani 3–0 in the quarter-final, and Jennifer Budd 4–0 in the semi-final. In the final, Kamani lost the first three frames to Jessica Woods, then won the next two frames before Woods took the sixth frame to complete a 4–2 victory. Kamani won the Indian national snooker title in 2015, with a 4–2 defeat of Pillai in the final. At the 2015 IBSF Six-Reds Snooker Championship, Kamani topped her qualifying group. in the knockout phase, she beat Floriza Andal 4–1 but then lost 1–4 to Ng On-yee in the semi-final.

2015 also saw Kamani reach the semi-final of the 2015 IBSF World Snooker Championship. She topped her qualifying group, winning all four matches without losing a frame, including a victory over Wendy Jans, who had won the title in the three previous years and would go on to win the tournament again. In the knockout, Kamani eliminated Amy Claire King 4–0 and Chitra Magimairaj 4–3 before losing 3–4 to Anastasia Nechaeva after leading 3–1.

She reached the semi-final of the 2015 ISBF six-red snooker tournament, held in Karachi, and won the first frame against Ng On-yee, but then scored only 31 points whilst losing the next four frames and the match. Kamani started 2016 by winning the Indian National six-red Snooker Championship with a 4–1 victory over Pillai in the final. In the national snooker Championships the following month, the same two players met in the final, but this time Pillai won, 4–2, to take the title from Kamani. She reached the semi-finals of the 2016 Asian Billiards Sports Championships Ladies' 6 reds Snooker Championships, after defeating reigning world champion Ng On-yee 4–2 in the group stage.

In November 2016, Kamani reached the final of the 2016 IBSF World Snooker Championship, where she faced Wendy Jans, with Jans looking to win her fifth consecutive world title. Kamani lost both of the first two frames on the black ball, and Jans went on to complete a 5–0 victory. Kamani lost in the semi-finals of the IBSF 6 reds Women Snooker Championship. She won the Indian National six-red snooker championship in Mumbai the following month, and followed this with victories in the 2017 national billiards championship and national snooker championship, to hold all three titles at the same time. In the billiards tournament she beat Varsha Sanjeev in the final, and in the snooker final won 4–2 over Arantxa Sanchis.

She was part of the "Hyderabad Hustlers" team in Cue Slam, a 2017 series of events featuring players including players participating included Kelly Fisher, Vidya Pillai, Laura Evans, Anastasia Nechaeva, Darren Morgan and Pankaj Advani in five teams playing a series of snooker and nine-ball pool matches, but her team failed to progress beyond the group stage. Later that year, she was a 2017 Asian Billiards Sports Championships Snooker Championships Ladies semi-finalist.

At the 2018 national championships, Kamani was trailing 1–3 in the final to Varsha Sanjeev, but then took three consecutive frames to win 4–3. Kamani won the 2018 Asian Billiards Sports Championships Ladies Championship organised by the Asian Confederation of Billiards Sports. She topped the table for qualifying, then in the knockout competition defeated Aye Mi Aung 3–0 and Ka Kai Wan 3–1, then winning 3–0 against Siripaporn Nuanthakhamjan. At the 2018 IBSF 6 reds Women Snooker Championships, she reached the semi-finals; in the main Snooker Championships she reached the same stage.

Kamani was selected as part of "Women's Team Asia" which won at the World Team Trophy event in Paris in March 2019. This was a demonstration event to promote the inclusion of cue sports at the Paris 2024 Olympic Games, featuring simultaneous play of three games, snooker, carom and pool, in the same hall. She was runner-up to Nutcharut Wongharuthai in the 2019 IBSF World Women's 6 Reds Championship, losing 2–4 in the final. Kamani was runner-up in the 2020 Indian snooker championship, reaching the final with wins over Sanchis (30) and Sanjeev (3–1), then losing the final 2–3 to Pillai. She regained the national billiards title in 2020 by winning 3–1 (in games of 75-up) against Keerath Bhandaal.

== Career finals ==
Individual snooker finals
Outcome	Year	Championship	Opponent in the final	Score	Ref.
Runner-up	2014	Australian Open	Jessica Woods (AUS)	2–4	
Winner	2015	Indian Championship	Vidya Pillai (IND)	4–2	
Winner	2016	Indian six-reds Championship	Vidya Pillai (IND)	4–1	
Runner-up	2016	Indian Championship	Vidya Pillai (IND)	2–4	
Runner-up	2016	IBSF World Snooker Championship	Wendy Jans (BEL)	0–5	
Winner	2016	Indian six-reds Championship	Vidya Pillai (IND)	4–1	
Winner	2017	Indian Championship	Arantxa Sanchis (IND)	4–2	
Winner	2017	World Women's Snooker Championship Challenge Cup	Nutcharut Wongharuthai (THA)	4–2	
Winner	2017	Indian six-reds Championship	Vidya Pillai (IND)	4–2	
Winner	2018	Indian Championship	Varsha Sanjeev (IND)	4–3	
Winner	2018	Asian Billiards Sports Championships Ladies Championship	Siripaporn Nuanthakhamjan (THA)	3–0	
Runner-up	2019	IBSF Women's 6 Reds Championship	Nutcharut Wongharuthai (THA)	2–4	
Runner-up	2020	Indian Championship	Vidya Pillai (IND)	2–3	
Winner	2021	Indian Championship	Anupama Ramchandran (IND)	3–1	
Winner	2022	Indian Championship	Keerthana Pandian (IND)	3–0	
Winner	2026	Indian Championship	Anupama Ramachandran (IND)	3-1	

Individual English billiards finals
Outcome	Year	Championship	Opponent in the final	Score	Ref.
Winner	2017	Indian Championship	Varsha Sanjeev (IND)	3–2 (75-up)	
Winner	2020	Indian Championship	Keerath Bhandaala (IND)	3–1 (75-up)	
Runner-up	2021	Indian Championship	Varsha Sanjeev (IND)	1–3 (75-up)	
Winner	2022	Indian Championship	R Umadevi Nagaraj (IND)	3–0 (75-up)	
Runner-up	2023	Indian Championship	Anupama Ramachandran (IND)	2–3 (100-up)	
Runner-up	2026	Indian Championship	Anupama Ramachandran (IND)	112-197	

Individual heyball finals
Outcome	Year	Championship	Opponent in the final	Score	Ref.
Runner-up	2025	Indian Women's Championship	Vidya Pillai (IND)	6-8	

Team finals and titles
Outcome	Year	Championship	Team/partner	Opponent(s) in the final	Score	Ref.
Runner-up	2016	IBSF Team Snooker Championships (women's)	India 1 (with Vidya Pillai)	Hong Kong 1 (Ng On-yee and Ka Kai Wan)	3–4	
Winner	2019	World Team Trophy	Women's Team Asia (with Kim Ga-young (KOR) and Pheavy Sruong (CAM)	Women's Team Europe (Jasmin Ouschan (AUT), Gülşen Degener (TUR) and Anastasia Nechaeva (RUS))	Round-robin	
Winner	2023	Women's Snooker World Cup	India 1 (with Anupama Ramachandran)	England 1 (Reanne Evans and Rebecca Kenna)	4–3	
