= Wendy Jans =

Belgian snooker player (born 1983)

Personal information
- Born: 14 June 1983 (age 43) Bree, Belgium

Sport
- Country: Belgium
- Sport: Snooker

Wendy Jans (born 14 June 1983, in Bree, Belgium) is a Belgian professional snooker and pool player. She has won the IBSF World Snooker Championship for women nine times. She reached her first women's world final at the 2022 World Women's Snooker Championship, but lost 5–6 to Nutcharut Wongharuthai on the final black ball.

== Career ==
Jans has won multiple national, European and World snooker titles. She won the Belgian national title nineteen times between 1998 and 2023.

She has won a record twelve European Billiards and Snooker Association Ladies Championship titles, including six consecutive titles from 2013 to 2018, and the IBSF World Ladies Snooker Championship in 2006, 2012, 2013, 2014, 2015, 2016, 2017, 2021, 2022. Having beaten Waratthanun Sukritthanes in the 2017 IBSF World Snooker Championship final to win her seventh title, Jans lost 2–5 to her in the 2018 final.

Jans, Reanne Evans and Anita Rizzuti all took part in the 2010 World Open, playing against men. Jans lost 1–3 to Simon Bedford in the first round. Jans and Ng On-yee were the two women competitors in the mixed singles snooker at the 2017 World Games, held in Wrocław. Jans lost 1–3 to Declan Brennans in her first match.

At the 2022 World Women's Snooker Championship, Jans defeated 12-time champion Reanne Evans 4–1 in the quarter-finals. She advanced to reach her first women's world final, but lost 5–6 to Nutcharut Wongharuthai on the final black ball.

She owns a snooker club in Neerpelt. Her highest break is 136.

== Career highlights ==
=== Snooker ===
==== IBSF women's finals ====
Outcome	No.	Year	Venue	Opponent	Score	Ref.
Runner-up	1.	2003	Jiangmen, China	(England) Kelly Fisher	2–5	
Runner-up	2.	2004	Veldhoven, Netherlands	(England) Reanne Evans	1–5	
Winner	1.	2006	Amman, Jordan	(Hong Kong) Jaique Ip	5–0	
Runner-up	3.	2007	Korat, Thailand	(England) Reanne Evans	0–5	
Runner-up	4.	2008	Wels, Austria	(England) Reanne Evans	3–5	
Winner	2.	2012	Sofia, Bulgaria	(Hong Kong) Ng On-yee	5–1	
Winner	3.	2013	Daugavpils, Latvia	(China) Shi Chunxia	5–3	
Winner	4.	2014	Bangalore, India	(Russia) Anastasia Nechaeva	5–2	
Winner	5.	2015	Hurghada, Egypt	(Russia) Anastasia Nechaeva	5–1	
Winner	6.	2016	Doha, Qatar	(India) Amee Kamani	5–0	
Winner	7.	2017	Doha, Qatar	(Thailand) Waratthanun Sukritthanes	5–2	
Runner-up	5.	2018	Yangon, Myanmar	(Thailand) Waratthanun Sukritthanes	2–5	
Winner	8.	2021	Doha, Qatar	(Thailand) Nutcharut Wongharuthai	4–1	
Winner	9.	2022	Antalya, Turkey	(India) Vidya Pillai	4–3	

==== European Championship Women's Individual Finals ====
Outcome	No.	Year	Venue	Opponent	Score	Ref.
Runner-up	1.	1999	Enschede, Netherlands	(England) Kelly Fisher	2–5	
Runner-up	2.	2000	Stirling, Scotland	(England) Kelly Fisher	0–5	
Runner-up	3.	2001	Riga, Latvia	(England) Kelly Fisher	3–5	
Runner-up	4.	2002	Kalisz, Poland	(England) Kelly Fisher	0–5	
Runner-up	5.	2003	Bad Wildungen, Germany	(England) Kelly Fisher	4–5	
Winner	1.	2004	Völkermarkt, Austria	(England) Reanne Evans	5–3	
Winner	2.	2005	Ostrów Wielkopolski, Poland	(England) Katie Henrick	5–3	
Winner	3.	2006	Constanța, Romania	(Belgium) Isabelle Jonckheere	5–0	
Runner-up	6.	2007	(Republic of Ireland) Carlow, Ireland	(England) Reanne Evans	2–5	
Winner	4.	2009	Duffel, Belgium	(Russia) Anna Mazhirina	5–0	
Winner	5.	2010	Bucharest, Romania	(Germany) Diana Stateczny	5–3	
Winner	6.	2011	Sofia, Bulgaria	(Latvia) Tatjana Vasiljeva	5–1	
Runner-up	7.	2012	Daugavpils, Latvia	(Latvia) Tatjana Vasiljeva	4–5	
Winner	7.	2013	Zielona Góra, Poland	(Russia) Anastasia Nechaeva	5–1	
Winner	8.	2014	Sofia, Bulgaria	(Russia) Anastasia Nechaeva	5–0	
Winner	9.	2015	Prague, Czech Republic	(Russia) Daria Sirotina	5–0	
Winner	10.	2016	Vilnius, Lithuania	(Russia) Daria Sirotina	5–4	
Winner	11.	2017	Shengjin, Albania	(Latvia) Anna Prysazhnuka	5–1	
Winner	12.	2018	Bucharest, Romania	(Belgium) Cathy Dehaene	4–0	
Winner	13.	2021	Albufeira, Portugal	(England) Jamie Hunter	4–1	
Runner-up	8.	2023	Albena, Bulgaria	(Latvia) Anna Prysazhnuka	3–4	

==== Team competitions ====
Outcome	No.	Year	Championship	Opponents	Score	Ref.
Winner	1	2003	WLBSA Women's World Doubles, with Kathy Howden	Lea Lindhout and Valerie Finnie	3–2	
Winner	2	2007	European Team Championship, with Isabelle Jonckheere (Belgium 1)	Hanna Mergies and Malgorzata Klys (Poland)	5–0	
Runner-up	1	2014	World Mixed Doubles Championship, with Jamie Clarke	Ben Woollaston and Yana Shut	0–3	
Winner	3	2017	European Team Championship, with Cathy Dehaene (Belgium 1)	Anastasia Nechaeva and Daria Sirotina (Russia 1)	4–3	

==== BBSA Belgian National Championship (Women's) ====
Outcome	No.	Year	Opponent	Score	Ref.
Winner		1998	Valerie Van Bellinghen	4–2	
Runner-up		1999	Valerie Van Bellinghen	1–4	
Winner		2000	Valerie Van Bellinghen	4–1	
Winner		2001	Valerie Van Bellinghen	4–1	
Winner		2002	Candide Binon	4–2	
Winner		2003	Isabelle Jonckheere	4–0	
Winner		2004	Candide Binon	4–2	
Winner		2008	Candide Binon	4–0	
Winner		2009	Isabelle Jonckheere	4–1	
Winner		2010	Isabelle Jonckheere	4–0	
Runner-up		2011	Isabelle Jonckheere	0–4	
Winner		2012	Cathy Dehaene	4–3	
Winner		2013	Cathy Dehaene	4–1	
Winner		2014	Cathy Dehaene	4–0	
Winner		2015	Emilie Demeester	4–0	
Winner		2016	Cathy Dehaene	4–0	
Winner		2017	Iris Moyens	4–0	
Winner		2018	Melissa Eens	4–0	
Winner		2019	Cathy Dehaene	4–0	
Winner		2023	Anja Vandenbussche	4–0	

==== Other Snooker ====
Outcome	No.	Year	Championship	Opponent	Score	Ref.
Winner		1999	EBSA Continental Cup	Cathy Dehaene	–	
Winner		2001	EBSA Continental Cup	Ewa Pieniazek	3–0	
Winner		2003	EBSA Continental Cup	Natascha Niermann	3–2	
Winner		2003	WLBSA Scottish Open	Maria Catalano	4–1	

=== Pool ===
- Ladies Spirit Tour 2005 #3 (Coral Springs)
- Weert 9-Ball Open – 2006, 2008
