= Tatjana Vasiljeva =

Latvian snooker player

Tatjana Vasiļjeva
Personal information
- Born: 1983 (age 42–43) Latvia

Sport
- Country: Latvia
- Sport: Snooker

Tatjana Vasiļjeva is a Latvian snooker player.

== Career ==
She is national champion and European champion in snooker. She was the winner of the European ladies championship in 2012.

Vasiljeva and Anna Prysazhnuka were runners-up in the 2016 Ladies European Team Snooker Championship, losing 1–4 to the Russia 1 team of Anastasia Nechaeva and Daria Sirotina in the final.

== Career finals ==
=== Team finals ===
Outcome	No.	Year	Championship	Team/partner	Opponent(s) in the final	Score
Winner	1.	2010	World Mixed Doubles Championship	(England) Joe Perry	(England) Martin Gould (England) Pam Wood	3–2
Winner	2.	2011	World Mixed Doubles Championship (2)	(England) Joe Perry	(England) Martin Gould (England) Pam Wood	3–2
Winner	3.	2012	World Mixed Doubles Championship (3)	(England) Joe Perry	(England) Nigel Ward (England) Emma Bonney	3–1

=== Amateur finals ===
Outcome	No.	Year	Championship	Opponent in the final	Score
Runner-up	1.	2011	EBSA European Snooker Championship	(Belgium) Wendy Jans	1–5
Winner	1.	2012	EBSA European Snooker Championship	(Belgium) Wendy Jans	5–4
