= Anastasia Nechaeva =

Russian snooker and pool player

Personal information
- Born: 9 May 1993 (age 33) Russia

Sport
- Country: Russia
- Sport: Snooker

Anastasia Nechaeva (born 9 May 1993) is a Russian amateur snooker and professional pool player. She was runner-up in the 2014 and 2015 IBSF World Snooker Championships.

== Playing career ==
Nechaeva had success in pool as a teenager, including winning the 2009 European Championship Girls Eight-ball championship and the 2009 European Championship Girls Nine-ball championship. She later finished as runner-up at the 2011 WPA World Nine-ball Junior Championship.

In snooker, she was runner-up in both 2013 and 2014 at the EBSA European Snooker Championship, losing both times to Wendy Jans.

In 2013, she won all six of her qualifying matches at the EBSA European Snooker Championship, and was seeded second in the main draw, behind Jans. At the last 16 stage, she whitewashed Inese Lukashevska 4–0, then won 4–1 over Roberta Cutajar in the quarter-final. A semi-final frame victory over Daria Sirotina, 4–3, saw Nechaeva move into the final, where Jans won convincingly, 5–1.

At the EBSA European Snooker Championship, following year, 2014, Nechaeva won all of her qualifying matches and was seeded second in the main draw, behind Jans, as in 2013. After a 4–0 victory over Manon Melief and a 4–2 defeat of Vicky Carter. Another repeat of the previous year, a 4–3 win over Daria Sirotina in the semi-final meant facing Jans in the final again. Jans won the final 5–0.

At the 2014 IBSF World Snooker Championship, Nechaeva was seeded ninth after the qualifying competition. She joined the last 24 round for the knockout, and progressed through to the final by beating Judy Walia 4–1, Vidya Pillai 4–2, Ka Kai Wan 4–0 and Daria Sirotina 4–2. In the final against Wendy Jans, Nechaeva led 1–0 and 2–0 but ultimately lost 2–5.

Nechaeva was also runner-up at the 2015 IBSF World Snooker Championship, once again losing to Jans. Nechaeva won all five of her matches in qualifying and was seeded fifth into the main draw. In the last 16 she beat Jessica Woods 4–2, then Siripaporn Nuanthakhamjan 4–0 in the quarter-final. In the semi-final, she faced Amee Kamani, the top seed from qualifying, and from 3–1 down, took the match 4–3 to progress into the final. In the final, Nechaeva took only the fifth frame, losing 1–5 as Jans won the title for the fourth year in a row.

She was part of the "Bengalaru Buddies" team in Cue Slam, a 2017 series of events featuring five teams playing a series of snooker and Nine-ball pool matches. Other players participating included Kelly Fisher, Vidya Pillai, Laura Evans, Amee Kamani, Darren Morgan and Pankaj Advani

Nechaeva was selected as part of "Women's Team Europe" at the World Team Trophy event in Paris in March 2019. This was a demonstration event to promote the inclusion of cue sports at the Paris 2024 Olympic Games, featuring simultaneous play of three games, snooker, carom and pool, in the same hall.

At the 2019 EBSA European Snooker Championship, Nechaeva emerged from the qualifying groups seeded fourth. In the last 16 she beat Yana Shut 3–1. In the quarter-final she faced Wendy Jans who had won the title in each of the previous six years, including the 2013 and 2014 wins over Nechaeva in the final. Jans won the first frame, but Nechaeva won the next four to take the match 4–1. This was the first time since 2008, and only the second time since 1999, that Jans had not reached the final. Nechaeva beat Anna Prysazhnuka 4–2 in the semi-final, but then lost 2–4 to Diana Stateczny in the final. Nechaeva lost the first frame, then won the next two to lead 2–1, before losing three in a row.

== Titles and achievements ==
Snooker

- 2012 European Ladies Team Champion (with Daria Sirotina)
- 2013 European Championships – Women's runner up
- 2013 European Ladies Team Champion (with Daria Sirotina)
- 2014 European Championships – Women's runner up
- 2014 European Ladies Team Champion (with Daria Sirotina)
- 2014 World Amateur Championship – Women's runner-up
- 2015 IBSF World Snooker Championship – Silver – 2015
- 2015 European Championships – Women's semi-final
- 2015 European Ladies Team Champion (with Daria Sirotina)
- 2016 European Championships – Women's semi-final
- 2016 European Ladies Team Champion (with Daria Sirotina)
- 2017 IBSF 6-Reds World Championship – Women's semi-final
- 2018 European Championships – Women's semi-final
- 2018 European Ladies Team Champion (with Polina Astakhova)
- 2019 European Ladies Team Champion (with Polina Astakhova)
- 2019 European Championships Ladies runner-up
- Seven-time Russian Women's Snooker Champion

Nine-ball pool

- 2008 European Championship Girls – 3rd
- 2009 European Girls Champion
- 2011 European Women's Championship Women
- 2011 WPA World Nine-ball Junior Championship runner-up

Eight-ball pool

- 2009 European Girls Champion
- 2011 European Championship Girls – 3rd

Straight pool

- 2010 European Championship Women Team – winner
