= Vidya Pillai =

Indian snooker player

Personal information
- Nickname: Queen of the Green
- Born: 26 November 1977 (age 48) Tiruchirapalli, Tamil Nadu, India

Sport
- Country: India
- Sport: Snooker

Vidya Viswanathan Pillai (born 26 November 1977) is an Indian professional snooker player. Vidya Pillai grew up in Chennai, Tamil Nadu. In recognition of her achievements, the Government of Karnataka bestowed her with the Ekalavya award in 2016 for outstanding performance in Sports. She has won several International medals for India and in 2013 won the gold medal in the IBSF World Team Snooker Championship, Gold in the IBSF Australian Women's Ranking Snooker Championship in 2016 and was the first Indian woman to reach the finals of the WLBSA World Women's Snooker Championship in 2017. She is also a 9-time winner of the National Championship Title.

== National career ==
Vidya Pillai credits former Indian international cricketer Hemang Badani for introducing her to the sport when she was aged 22, and the late national billiards champion, TG Kamala Devi, for inspiring her. Pillai is a ten-time Women's National Snooker Champion, her latest victory coming in 2020. She has finished runner-up in three different editions of the tournament, in 2006, 2009 and 2015. She also won the Indian National 6-Red Snooker Championship in 2013 & the Indian National 9-Ball Pool Championship in 2005.

In 2017 she was a part of the Chennai Strikers in the Indian Cue Masters League, where she was teamed up with Pankaj Advani for mixed doubles.

In 2018, Vidya started working with the acclaimed SightRight Accredited coach Pranit Ramchandani.

== International career ==
Vidya Pillai made her first international appearance at the 2007 IBSF World Snooker Championship (Ladies) and lost in the quarter-finals. Ever since, she has won a gold medal in the IBSF World Team Snooker Championship in 2013, Gold in the IBSF Australian Women's Ranking Snooker Championship in 2016, Gold in the IBSF Australian Open Women's Snooker Championship in 2010, Two Silver medals in the IBSF World 6 Reds Snooker Championship Women in 2015 and 2016, one Silver in the IBSF World Team Snooker Championship in 2016, two Bronze medals IBSF World Snooker Championship in 2010 and 2012, one Bronze in the IBSF World Team Snooker Championship in 2014 and reached the semi-finals at the WLBSA World Billiards Championship in 2008. She has also won a silver medal at the Asian Billiard Sport Championship held at Doha in 2016. She was runner-up to Ng On-yee at the WLBSA World Women's Snooker Championship in 2017.

== Career finals ==
Ranking event finals
| Outcome | Year | Championship | Opponent(s) | Score | Ref. |
|---|---|---|---|---|---|
| Winner | 2003 | Indian National Snooker Championship | | | |
| Winner | 2005 | Indian National Snooker Championship | | | |
| Winner | 2005 | Indian National 9-Ball Pool Championship | | | |
| Winner | 2005 | Indian National 8-Ball Pool Championship | | | |
| Runner-up | 2006 | Indian National Snooker Championship | | | |
| Winner | 2007 | Indian National Snooker Championship | | | |
| Runner-up | 2007 | Indian National 8-Ball Pool Championship | | | |
| Winner | 2008 | Indian National Snooker Championship | | | |
| Runner-up | 2008 | Indian National 8-Ball Pool Championship | | | |
| Runner-up | 2009 | Indian National Snooker Championship | | | |
| Winner | 2010 | Australian Open Women's Snooker Championship | | | |
| Winner | 2010 | Indian National Snooker Championship | | | |
| Runner-up | 2010 | Indian National 6-Red Snooker Championship | | | |
| Runner-up | 2010 | Indian National 8-Ball Pool Championship | | | |
| Winner | 2012 | Indian National Snooker Championship | | | |
| Winner | 2013 | IBSF World Team Snooker Championship (with Arantxa Sanchis (IND)) | Ng On Yee (HKG) and So Man Yan (HKG) | 3-2 | |
| Winner | 2013 | Indian National 6-Red Snooker Championship | | | |
| Winner | 2013 | Indian National Snooker Championship | | | |
| Winner | 2014 | Indian National Snooker Championship | | | |
| Runner-up | 2015 | IBSF 6 Reds snooker Snooker Championship | | | |
| Runner-up | 2015 | Indian National Snooker Championship | Amee Kamani (IND) | 2–4 | |
| Winner | 2016 | IBSF Australian Women's Ranking Snooker Championship | | | |
| Runner-up | 2016 | IBSF 6 Reds snooker Snooker Championship | Siripaporn Nuanthakhamjan (THA) | | |
| Runner-up | 2016 | IBSF World Team Snooker Championship (with Amee Kamani (IND) | Ng On Yee (HKG) and Ka Kai Wan (HKG) | | |
| Runner-up | 2016 | Asian Billiard Sports Championship | | | |
| Winner | 2016 | Indian National Snooker Championship | Amee Kamani (IND) | 4–2 | |
| Runner-up | 2016 | Indian National 6-Red Snooker Championship | Amee Kamani (IND) | 1–4 | |
| Runner-up | 2017 | World Women's Snooker Championship | Ng On-yee (HKG) | 5–6 | |
| Winner | 2020 | Indian National Snooker Championship | Amee Kamani (IND) | 3–2 | |
| Winner | 2025 | Commonwealth Heyball Championship | Marina Jacobs (SAF) | 2–1 (after 5–5) | |
| Winner | 2025 | Indian National Heyball Championship | Amee Kamani (IND) | 8–6 | |
