= Daria Sirotina =

Russian snooker and pool player (born 1993)

Personal information
- Born: 22 June 1993 (age 33) Russia

Pool career
- Country: Russia
- Pool games: snooker, Nine-ball

Daria Sirotina (born 22 June 1993) is a Russian amateur snooker and professional pool player.

== Career ==
She won the European Ladies Team Championship, partnered with Anastasia Nechaeva, each year from 2012 to 2016. She was runner-up in the women's 2013 IBSF World Six-reds Championship, failing to score in three of the four frames in the final, losing 0–4 to Ng On-yee.

Sirotina was runner-up to Wendy Jans at the EBSA European Snooker Championship in both 2014 and 2015.

She was part of the "Gujarat Kings" team in Cue Slam, a 2017 series of events featuring five teams playing a series of snooker and nine-ball pool matches. Other players participating included Kelly Fisher, Vidya Pillai, Laura Evans, Amee Kamani, Darren Morgan and Pankaj Advani. The Gujarat Kings won the competition, beating Delhi Dons 3–0 in the final.

== Titles and achievements ==
Snooker

- 2012 European Ladies Team Champion (with Anastasia Nechaeva)
- 2013 European Ladies Team Champion (with Anastasia Nechaeva)
- 2013 EBSA European Snooker Championship – Women – semi-finalist
- 2014 European Ladies Team Champion (with Anastasia Nechaeva)
- 2014 EBSA European Snooker Championship – Women – semi-finalist
- 2014 IBSF World Amateur Championship – Women – semi-finalist
- 2014 IBSF Women's Team Champion (with Anastasia Nechaeva)
- 2015 European Ladies Team Champion (with Anastasia Nechaeva)
- 2015 EBSA European Snooker Championship – Women – runner-up
- 2016 European Ladies Team Champion (with Anastasia Nechaeva)
- 2016 EBSA European Snooker Championship – Women – runner-up
- 2017 EBSA European Snooker Championship – Women – semi-finalist

Six-red snooker

- 2013 IBSF World Six-reds Championship runner-up

Eight-ball pool

- 2009 European Girls' Championship runner-up
- 2011 European Girls' Championship runner-up
- 2012 Russian Women's Champion
- 2012 European Women's Championship – bronze
- 2014 European Women's Champion

Ten-ball pool

- 2010 European Girls' Championship runner-up
- 2011 European Girls' Champion

Straight pool

- 2009 European Girls' Championship runner-up
