= 2008 World Ladies Snooker Championship =

Women's snooker event, held May 2008

Tournament information
- Dates: 3–7 May 2008
- Venue: Cambridge Snooker Centre
- City: Cambridge
- Country: England
- Organisation: World Ladies Billiards and Snooker Association
- Format: Round Robin, Single elimination
- Highest break: Reanne Evans (ENG) 102

Final
- Champion: Reanne Evans (ENG)
- Runner-up: June Banks (ENG)
- Score: 5–2

The 2008 World Ladies Snooker Championship was the 2008 edition of the World Women's Snooker Championship, first held in 1976, and was played at Cambridge Snooker Centre from 3 to 7 May. The tournament was won by Reanne Evans, who achieved her fourth consecutive world title by defeating June Banks 5–2 in the final. Evans also made the highest break of the tournament, 102.

There were four round-robin qualifying groups, three of six players each, and one of seven players, with the top two players in each group progressing into the knockout stage. In the final, Banks won the first frame on the pink. Evans compiled a break of 52 in the next frame to win it, then took five of the next six frames. Hannah Jones, aged 11, won the under-21 title in an event run alongside the main tournament.

== Main Draw ==
Results from the quarter-finals onwards are shown below.

Quarter-finals; Best of 7 Frames
'Reanne Evans (ENG)	4
Chitra Magimairaj (IND)	0
Emma Bonney (ENG)	4
Jaique Ip (HKG)	3
Maria Catalano (ENG)	4
Katie Henrick (ENG)	1
June Banks (ENG)	4
Tina Owen-Sevilton (ENG)	0

Semi-finals; Best of 7 Frames
'Reanne Evans (ENG)	4
Emma Bonney (ENG)	0
Maria Catalano (ENG)	2
June Banks (ENG)	4

Final; Best of 9 Frames
'Reanne Evans (ENG)	5
June Banks (ENG)	2

== Side events ==
Side event finals
Championship	Winner(s)	Losing finalist(s)	Score
Seniors Championship	Christine Sharpe (ENG)	Malgorzata Sikorska (POL)	3–1
Juniors Championship	Hannah Jones (ENG)	Joanna Davies (ENG)	2–0
Doubles Championship	Jaique Ip (HKG) and Pam Wood (ENG)	Chris Sharpe (ENG) and Laura Alves (BRA)	2–1
Mixed Doubles Championship	Reanne Evans (ENG) and Neil Robertson (AUS)	Leah Willett (ENG) and Joe Perry (ENG)	3–1
English billiards	Emma Bonney (ENG)	Eva Palmius (SWE)	216–119
