= 2009 World Ladies Snooker Championship =

Women's snooker event, held April 2009

Tournament information
- Dates: 4–8 April 2009
- Venue: Cambridge Snooker Centre
- City: Cambridge
- Country: England
- Organisation: World Ladies Billiards and Snooker Association
- Format: Round Robin, Single elimination
- Winner's share: £800
- Highest break: Reanne Evans (ENG) 89

Final
- Champion: Reanne Evans (ENG)
- Runner-up: Maria Catalano (ENG)
- Score: 5–2

The 2009 World Ladies Snooker Championship was the 2009 edition of the World Women's Snooker Championship, first held in 1976, and was played at Cambridge Snooker Centre from 4 to 8 April. The tournament was won by Reanne Evans, who achieved her fifth consecutive world title by defeating Maria Catalano 5–2 in the final. Evans received £800 prize money for her win. She also made the highest break of the tournament, 89.

There were four round-robin qualifying groups of seven players each, with the top two players in each group progressing into the knockout stage. Hannah Jones, aged 12, won the under-21 title in an event run alongside the main tournament. Jones, partnering Jaique Ip, also won the double competition.

== Main Draw ==
Quarter-finals; Best of 7 Frames
Reanne Evans (ENG)	4
Tina Owen-Sevilton (ENG)	0
Emma Bonney (ENG)	4
June Banks (ENG)	0
Katie Henrick (ENG)	4
Jaique Ip (HKG)	1
Maria Catalano (ENG)	4
Ching Ching Yu (HKG)	2

Semi-finals; Best of 7 Frames
Reanne Evans (ENG)	4
Emma Bonney (ENG)	1
Katie Henrick (ENG)	3
Maria Catalano (ENG)	4

Final; Best of 9 Frames
Reanne Evans (ENG)	5
Maria Catalano (ENG)	2
