= 2005–06 snooker season =

Details
- Duration: 17 May 2005 – 10 May 2006
- Tournaments: 24 (6 ranking events)

Triple Crown winners
- UK Championship: (China) Ding Junhui
- Masters: (Scotland) John Higgins
- World Championship: (Scotland) Graeme Dott

The 2005–06 snooker season was a series of snooker tournaments played between 17 May 2005 and 10 May 2006. There were six ranking tournaments, and the British Open and Irish Masters tournaments were removed from calendar. The Northern Ireland Trophy was held for the first time as non-ranking tournament, and the Pot Black was held again after a 12-year hiatus.

== New professional players ==
Countries

- Bahrain
- China
- England
- Malaysia
- Malta
- Northern Ireland
- Scotland

Note: new in this case means that these players were not on the 2004/2005 professional Main Tour.

International champions

1. IBSF World Snooker Championship winner: (Northern Ireland) Mark Allen
2. IBSF World Under-21 Snooker Championship winner: (England) Gary Wilson
3. EBSA European Snooker Championships winner: (Malta) Alex Borg
4. EBSA European Under-19 Snooker Championships winner: (England) Chris Norbury
5. ACBS Asian Snooker Championship winner: (China) Jin Long
6. ACBS Asian Under-21 Snooker Championship winner: (Malaysia) Moh Keen Ho

WPBSA Wildcard

7. (England) Judd Trump
8. (Bahrain) Habib Subah
9. (China) Liang Wenbo

From Challenge Tour

10. (England) Jamie Cope
11. (England) Lee Spick
12. (England) Justin Astley
13. (England) Matthew Couch
14. (England) Chris Norbury
15. (England) James Tatton
16. (England) Stuart Mann
17. (England) David Gilbert
18. (Scotland) James McBain

== Calendar ==
The following table outlines the results and dates for the ranking and major invitational events that took place.

=== World Snooker Tour ===
| Start | Finish | Country | Tournament name | Venue | City | Winner | Runner-up | Score | Ref. |
|---|---|---|---|---|---|---|---|---|---|
| 17 Aug | 21 Aug | NIR | Northern Ireland Trophy | Waterfront Hall | Belfast | (Wales) Matthew Stevens | (Scotland) Stephen Hendry | 9–7 | |
| 8 Oct | 16 Oct | ENG | Grand Prix | Guild Hall | Preston | (Scotland) John Higgins | (England) Ronnie O'Sullivan | 9–2 | |
| 29 Oct | | ENG | Pot Black | Royal Automobile Club | London | (Wales) Matthew Stevens | (England) Shaun Murphy | 1–0 | |
| 20 Nov | 23 Nov | WAL | Masters Qualifying Event | Pontin's | Prestatyn | (England) Stuart Bingham | (England) Ali Carter | 6–3 | |
| 15 Sep | 4 Dec | ENG | Premier League | G-Mex Centre | Manchester | (England) Ronnie O'Sullivan | (Scotland) Stephen Hendry | 6–0 | |
| 5 Dec | 18 Dec | ENG | UK Championship | Barbican Centre | York | (China) Ding Junhui | (England) Steve Davis | 10–6 | |
| 15 Jan | 22 Jan | ENG | Masters | Wembley Conference Centre | London | (Scotland) John Higgins | (England) Ronnie O'Sullivan | 10–9 | |
| 30 Jan | 5 Feb | MLT | Malta Cup | Hilton Conference Center | Portomaso | (Republic of Ireland) Ken Doherty | (Scotland) John Higgins | 9–8 | |
| 27 Feb | 5 Mar | WAL | Welsh Open | Newport Centre | Newport | (England) Stephen Lee | (England) Shaun Murphy | 9–4 | |
| 20 Mar | 26 Mar | CHN | China Open | Beijing University Students' Gymnasium | Beijing | (Wales) Mark Williams | (Scotland) John Higgins | 9–8 | |
| 15 Apr | 1 May | ENG | World Championship | Crucible Theatre | Sheffield | (Scotland) Graeme Dott | (England) Peter Ebdon | 18–14 | |

Ranking event
Non-ranking event

=== World Ladies Billiards and Snooker Association ===
| Start | Finish | Country | Tournament name | Venue | City | Winner | Runner-up | Score | Ref. |
|---|---|---|---|---|---|---|---|---|---|
| 24 Sep | 25 Sep | ENG | British Open | Savoy Snooker Centre | Snodland | (England) June Banks | (England) Reanne Evans | 4–0 | |
| 29 Oct | 29 Oct | ENG | UK Ladies Championship | Landywood Snooker Hall | Walsall | (England) Reanne Evans | (England) Maria Catalano | 4–0 | |
| 26 Nov | 26 Nov | ENG | East Anglian Championship | Cambridge Snooker Centre | Cambridge | (England) June Banks | (England) Reanne Evans | 4–3 | |
| 4 Feb | 4 Feb | ENG | Northern Championship | Regal Snooker Centre | Preston | (England) Maria Catalano | (England) June Banks | 4–1 | |
| 25 Feb | 25 Feb | ENG | Connie Gough Memorial | Rileys Snooker Club | Luton | (England) Maria Catalano | (England) Reanne Evans | 4–3 | |
| 1 Apr | 6 Apr | ENG | World Women's Championship | Cambridge Snooker Centre | Cambridge | (England) Reanne Evans | (England) Emma Bonney | 5–3 | |

=== Pontin's International Open Series ===
| Start | Finish | Country | Tournament name | Venue | City | Winner | Runner-up | Score | Ref. |
|---|---|---|---|---|---|---|---|---|---|
| 17 May | 21 May | WAL | PIOS I | Pontin's | Prestatyn | (China) Tian Pengfei | (England) Martin Gould | 6–3 | |
| 17 Jun | 21 Jun | WAL | PIOS II | Pontin's | Prestatyn | (England) Mark Joyce | (England) James Leadbetter | 6–3 | |
| 2 Sep | 7 Sep | WAL | PIOS III | Pontin's | Prestatyn | (China) Liu Song | (England) Stephen Rowlings | 6–1 | |
| 14 Oct | 19 Oct | WAL | PIOS IV | Pontin's | Prestatyn | (Republic of Ireland) Colm Gilcreest | (England) Mark Joyce | 6–3 | |
| 28 Nov | 1 Dec | WAL | PIOS V | Pontin's | Prestatyn | (England) Chris Melling | (England) Paul Davison | 6–5 | |
| 17 Feb | 20 Feb | WAL | PIOS VI | Pontin's | Prestatyn | (China) Liu Song | (England) Paul Davison | 6–3 | |
| 6 Mar | 9 Mar | WAL | PIOS VII | Pontin's | Prestatyn | (China) Tian Pengfei | (China) Liu Song | 6–3 | |
| 8 May | 10 May | WAL | PIOS VIII | Pontin's | Prestatyn | (England) Andrew Higginson | (England) Jamie O'Neill | 6–3 | |

=== Other events ===
| Start | Finish | Country | Tournament name | Venue | City | Winner | Runner-up | Score | Ref. |
|---|---|---|---|---|---|---|---|---|---|
| 20 Jul | 24 Jul | GER | World Games | Saalbau Bottrop | Duisburg | (United Kingdom) Gerard Greene | (China) Ding Junhui | 4–3 | |
| 1 Oct | 3 Oct | GER | Fürth German Open | Stadthalle | Fürth | (England) Mark King | (England) Michael Holt | 4–2 | |
| 22 Oct | 26 Oct | IRL | Irish Professional Championship | Spawell Sport & Leisure Complex | Templeogue | (Northern Ireland) Joe Swail | (Republic of Ireland) Ken Doherty | 9–7 | |
| 25 Nov | 27 Nov | SUI | Swiss Open | Billiard Center Im Funken | Zofingen | (England) Ricky Walden | (Republic of Ireland) Ken Doherty | 5–3 | |
| 17 Dec | 18 Dec | NED | Dutch Open | De Dieze | 's-Hertogenbosch | (Belgium) Bjorn Haneveer | (England) Michael Holt | 6–1 | |

== Official rankings ==
The top 16 of the world rankings, these players automatically played in the final rounds of the world ranking events and were invited for the Masters.

| No. | Ch. | Player | Points 2003/04 | Points 2004/05 | Total |
|---|---|---|---|---|---|
| 1 | Steady | (England) Ronnie O'Sullivan | 26650 | 23162 | 49812 |
| 2 | ▲ | (Scotland) Stephen Hendry | 20800 | 21337 | 42137 |
| 3 | ▲ | (Scotland) Stephen Maguire | 14025 | 19725 | 33750 |
| 4 | ▲ | (Wales) Matthew Stevens | 18450 | 19725 | 33712 |
| 5 | ▼ | (England) Paul Hunter | 18925 | 13200 | 32125 |
| 6 | ▼ | (Scotland) John Higgins | 16212 | 15812 | 32024 |
| 7 | ▲ | (England) Peter Ebdon | 15525 | 15650 | 31175 |
| 8 | ▲ | (England) Jimmy White | 18175 | 12787 | 30962 |
| 9 | ▼ | (Wales) Mark Williams | 16912 | 12837 | 29749 |
| 10 | ▼ | (England) Stephen Lee | 14025 | 15625 | 29650 |
| 11 | ▼ | (Republic of Ireland) Ken Doherty | 13237 | 15887 | 29124 |
| 12 | ▼ | (Scotland) Alan McManus | 12825 | 15975 | 28800 |
| 13 | ▲ | (Scotland) Graeme Dott | 14812 | 13500 | 28312 |
| 14 | ▲ | (England) Joe Perry | 15900 | 11250 | 27150 |
| 15 | ▼ | (England) Steve Davis | 11212 | 15775 | 26987 |
| 16 | ▲ | (England) Ian McCulloch | 12075 | 14537 | 26612 |

== World ranking points ==
The rankings for the 2006–07 season were based on the total points from the 2004–05 and 2005–06 seasons. There were 6 ranking events during the 2005–06 season.

== Points distribution ==
2005/2006 Points distribution for world ranking events:

| Tournament | Round → | L96 | L80 | L64 | L48 | L32 | L16 | QF | SF | F | W |
|---|---|---|---|---|---|---|---|---|---|---|---|
| Grand Prix | Unseeded loser | 400 | – | 900 | – | 1400 | 1900 | 2500 | 3200 | 4000 | 5000 |
| Grand Prix | Seeded loser | 250 | – | 450 | – | – | – | – | – | – | – |
| UK Championship | Unseeded loser | 600 | 975 | 1350 | 1725 | 2100 | 2850 | 3750 | 4800 | 6000 | 7500 |
| UK Championship | Seeded loser | 300 | 488 | 675 | 863 | 1050 | – | – | – | – | – |
| Malta Cup | Unseeded loser | 400 | 650 | 900 | 1150 | 1400 | 1900 | 2500 | 3200 | 4000 | 5000 |
| Malta Cup | Seeded loser | 200 | 325 | 450 | 575 | 700 | – | – | – | – | – |
| Welsh Open | Unseeded loser | 400 | 650 | 900 | 1150 | 1400 | 1900 | 2500 | 3200 | 4000 | 5000 |
| Welsh Open | Seeded loser | 200 | 325 | 450 | 575 | 700 | – | – | – | – | – |
| China Open | Unseeded loser | 400 | 650 | 900 | 1150 | 1400 | 1900 | 2500 | 3200 | 4000 | 5000 |
| China Open | Seeded loser | 200 | 325 | 450 | 575 | 700 | – | – | – | – | – |
| World Championship | Unseeded loser | 800 | 1300 | 1800 | 2300 | 2800 | 3800 | 5000 | 6400 | 8000 | 10000 |
| World Championship | Seeded loser | 400 | 650 | 900 | 1150 | 1400 | – | – | – | – | – |
