= 2010 World Ladies Snooker Championship =

Women's snooker event, held April 2010

Tournament information
- Dates: 3–7 April 2010
- Venue: Cambridge Snooker Centre
- City: Cambridge
- Country: England
- Organisation: World Ladies Billiards and Snooker Association
- Format: Round Robin, Single elimination
- Winner's share: £1,000
- Highest break: Reanne Evans (ENG) 78

Final
- Champion: Reanne Evans (ENG)
- Runner-up: Maria Catalano (ENG)
- Score: 5–1

The 2010 World Ladies Snooker Championship was the 2010 edition of the World Women's Snooker Championship, first held in 1976, and was played at Cambridge Snooker Centre from 3 to 7 April. The tournament was won by Reanne Evans, who achieved her sixth consecutive world title by defeating Maria Catalano 5–1 in the final. Evans received £1,000 prize money for her win. She also made the highest break of the tournament, 78.

There were four round-robin qualifying groups, three of five players each and one of four players, with the top two players in each group progressing into the knockout stage to play one of the top eight seeds.

== Main Draw ==
Last 16; Best of 5 frames
Reanne Evans (ENG)	3
Natascha Niermann (GER)	0
Jenny Poulter (ENG)	0
Chitra Magimairaj (IND)	3
June Banks (ENG)	3
Pam Wood (ENG)	0
Katie Henrick (ENG)	3
Tatjana Vasiljeva (LAT)	1
Emma Bonney (ENG)	3
Jasmine Bolsover (ENG)	0
Christine Sharp (ENG)	1
Ching Ching Yu (HKG)	3
Suzie Opacic (ENG)	3
Eva Palmius (SWE)	2
Maria Catalano (ENG)	3
Hannah Jones (ENG)	0

Quarter-finals; Best of 7 frames
Reanne Evans (ENG)	4
Chitra Magimairaj (IND)	0
June Banks (ENG)	3
Katie Henrick (ENG)	4
Emma Bonney (ENG)	4
Ching Ching Yu (HKG)	1
Suzie Opacic (ENG)	1
Maria Catalano (ENG)	4

Semi-finals; Best of 7 frames
Reanne Evans (ENG)	4
Katie Henrick (ENG)	3
Emma Bonney (ENG)	2
Maria Catalano (ENG)	4

Final; Best of 9 frames
Reanne Evans (ENG)	5
Maria Catalano (ENG)	1
