= 2007 World Women's Snooker Championship =

Women's World Snooker Championship
Tournament information
- Venue: Cambridge Snooker Centre
- Country: United Kingdom
- Organisation: World Ladies Billiards and Snooker Association
- Format: Single elimination
- Winner's share: £800
- Highest break: 87 (Reanne Evans)

Final
- Champion: Reanne Evans
- Runner-up: Katie Henrick
- Score: 5–3

The 2007 Women's World Snooker Championship was a women's snooker tournament played in the United Kingdom in 2007. Defending champion Reanne Evans beat Katie Henrick 5–3 in the final to win her third world title.

== Tournament summary ==
Reanne Evans was the reigning champion, having won the 2006 World Women's Snooker Championship. The 2007 tournament was played at the Cambridge Snooker Centre, the same venue as the 2005 and 2006 championships. Four round-robin qualifying group held over two days each produced two qualifiers for the quarter-finals.

In the final, Evans was level 3–3 with Henrick before winning the next two frames to claim her third successive title.

Evans compiled the highest break of the tournament, 87. She received £800 in prize money as champion.

== Main draw ==
Quarter-finals onwards shown below. Source: Snooker Scene

Quarter-finals; Best-of-7 frames
(England) Reanne Evans	4
(Sweden) Eva Palmius	0
(England) Emma Bonney	4
(England) Tina Owen-Sevilton	1
(England) Katie Henrick	4
(England) Maria Catalano	2
(England) June Banks	4
(India) Chitra Magimairaj	1

Semi-finals; Best-of-7 frames
(England) Reanne Evans	4
(England) Emma Bonney	0
(England) Katie Henrick	4
(England) June Banks	3

Final; Best-of-9 frames
(England) Reanne Evans	5
(England) Katie Henrick	3
