= 2014 Women's World Snooker Championship =

Women's snooker event, held April 2014

Tournament information
- Dates: April 2014
- Venue: Northern Snooker Centre
- City: Leeds
- Country: England
- Organisation: World Ladies Billiards and Snooker
- Format: Round Robin, Single elimination
- Total prize fund: £5,000
- Winner's share: £1,500
- Highest break: 79 ( Jessica Woods (AUS)

Final
- Champion: Reanne Evans (ENG)
- Runner-up: Ng On-yee (HKG)
- Score: 6–0

The 2014 Women's World Snooker Championship was a women's snooker tournament that took place at the Northern Snooker Centre in Leeds in April 2014. The event was the 2014 edition of the World Women's Snooker Championship first held in 1976. It was won by England's Reanne Evans, who defeated Hong Kong's Ng On-yee 6–0 in the final to win her tenth consecutive world title. The competition was sponsored by Eden Resources and had a total prize fund of £5,000.

Players competed in Round Robin groups to determine the sixteen players for the knockout stages. Evans won all twelve frames in her group matches, and lost frames only to Wendy Jans in the knockout stages. The highest break of the competition was a 79 compiled by Jessica Woods in the group stages, whilst the highest break of the knockout stages was 69 by Evans.

== Prize money ==
Source: Snooker Scene Magazine

- Winner: £1,500
- Runner-up: £1,000
- Losing semi-finalists: £400
- Losing quarter-finalists: £200
- Last 16 losers: £100

== Knockout stage ==
Players listed in bold indicate match winner.

**Last 16**; Best of 5 frames
(England) **Reanne Evans**	**3**
(Russia) Nastya Toumilovitch	0
(Hong Kong) **Jaique Ip**	**3**
(Latvia) Anna Prysazhnuka	2
(Belgium) **Wendy Jans**	**3**
(Belarus) Yana Shut	0
(Hong Kong) **So Man Yan**	**3**
(England) Vicky Carter	2
(Hong Kong) **Ng On-yee**	**3**
(Wales) Laura Evans	0
(Latvia) **Tatjana Vasiljeva**	**3**
(England) Hannah Jones	2
(England) **Maria Catalano**	**3**
(Russia) Irina Gorbataya	1
(England) **Emma Bonney**	**3**
(Australia) Jessica Woods	0

**Quarter-finals**; Best of 7 frames
(England) **Reanne Evans**	**4**
(Hong Kong) Jaique Ip	0
(Belgium) **Wendy Jans**	**4**
(Hong Kong) So Man Yan	1
(Hong Kong) **Ng On-yee**	**4**
(Latvia) Tatjana Vasiljeva	2
(England) Maria Catalano	2
(England) **Emma Bonney**	**4**

**Semi-finals**; Best of 7 frames
(England) **Reanne Evans**	**4**
(Belgium) Wendy Jans	2
(Hong Kong) **Ng On-yee**	**4**
(England) Emma Bonney	3

**Final**; Best of 11 frames
(England) **Reanne Evans**	6
(Hong Kong) Ng On-yee	0

== Other events ==
A number of other events took place around the World Championship.

- **Plate Final: Jenny Poulter** beat Katrina Wan 3–0 (The plate competition was for players who did not reach the knockout stage of the main competition)
- **Seniors Final: Chitra Magimairaj** beat Alena Asmolava 3–0
- **Under-21 Final: Hannah Jones** beat Yana Shut 3–1
- **Women's Pairs Final: Ng On-yee and So Man Yan** beat Reanne Evans and Anita Maflin 3–2
- **Mixed Pairs Final: Yana Shut and Ben Woollaston** beat Wendy Jans and Jamie Clarke 3–0
