= 2013 World Ladies Snooker Championship =

Women's snooker event

Tournament information
- Dates: April 2013
- Venue: Cambridge Snooker Centre
- City: Cambridge
- Country: England
- Organisation: World Ladies Billiards and Snooker Association
- Format: Single elimination
- Highest break: Reanne Evans (ENG) 117

Final
- Champion: Reanne Evans (ENG)
- Runner-up: Maria Catalano (ENG)
- Score: 6–3

The 2013 World Ladies Snooker Championship was the 2013 edition of the World Women's Snooker Championship, first held in 1976, and was played at Cambridge Snooker Centre from 14 to 15 April. The tournament was won by Reanne Evans, who achieved her ninth consecutive world title by defeating Maria Catalano 6–3 in the final, compiling two century breaks during the match, including a 117 that was the highest of the tournament.

There were four round-robin qualifying groups, each of five players, with the top three players in each group progressing into the knockout stage. The 2013 World Women's Billiards Championship, won by Emma Bonney, and a doubles snooker event, won by Ng On-yee and So Man Yan, were organised alongside the main snooker championship.

== Main Draw ==
First round Best of 5 frames
Emma Bonney (ENG)	3
Eva Palmius (SWE)	0
Maria Catalano (ENG)	3
So Man Yan (HKG)	1
Jaique Ip (HKG)	3
Jasmine Bolsover (ENG)	0
Ching Ching Yu (HKG)	3
Marianne Williams (ENG)	0

Quarter-finals; Best of 5 frames
Ng On-yee (HKG)	3
Emma Bonney (ENG)	0
Chitra Magimairaj (IND)	1
Maria Catalano (ENG)	3
'Reanne Evans (ENG)	3
Jaique Ip (HKG)	0
Hannah Jones (ENG)	0
Ching Ching Yu (HKG)	3

Semi-finals; Best of 7 frames
Ng On-yee (HKG)	0
Maria Catalano (ENG)	4
'Reanne Evans (ENG)	4
Ching Ching Yu (HKG)	0

Final; Best of 11 frames
Maria Catalano (ENG)	3
'Reanne Evans (ENG)	6
