= 2011 World Ladies Snooker Championship =

Women's snooker event, held April 2011

Tournament information
- Dates: 8–13 April 2011
- Venue: Pot Black Sports Bar
- City: Bury St Edmonds
- Country: England
- Organisation: World Ladies Billiards and Snooker Association
- Format: Round Robin, Single elimination
- Winner's share: £1,000
- Highest break: Emma Bonney (ENG) 67

Final
- Champion: Reanne Evans (ENG)
- Runner-up: Emma Bonney (ENG)
- Score: 5–1

The 2011 World Ladies Snooker Championship was the 2011 edition of the World Women's Snooker Championship, first held in 1976, and was played at the Pot Black Sports Bar, Bury St Edmonds, from 8 to 13 April. The tournament was won by Reanne Evans, who achieved her seventh consecutive world title by defeating Emma Bonney 5–1 in the final. It was Evans' 88th consecutive match win in women's snooker events. Evans received £1,000 prize money for her win. Bonney made the highest break of the tournament, 67.

There were four round-robin qualifying groups, each of five players, with the top two players in each group progressing into the knockout stage to play one of the top eight seeds. Hannah Jones, aged 14, won the under-21 title for the fourth consecutive year in an event run alongside the main tournament.

== Main Draw ==
Last 16; Best of 5 frames
Reanne Evans (ENG)	3
Marianne Williams (ENG)	0
Hannah Jones (ENG)	0
Ng On-yee (HKG)	3
Eva Palmius (SWE)	1
Jaique Ip (HKG)	3
Katie Henrick (ENG)	1
Tatjana Vasiljeva (LAT)	3
Emma Bonney (ENG)	3
Revanna Umadevi (IND)	1
Jenny Poulter (ENG)	1
Ching Ching Yu (HKG)	3
Christine Sharp (ENG)	1
So Man Yan (HKG)	3
Maria Catalano (ENG)	3
Natascha Niermann (GER)	0

Quarter-finals; Best of 7 frames
Reanne Evans (ENG)	4
Ng On-yee (HKG)	1
Jaique Ip (HKG)	3
Tatjana Vasiljeva (LAT)	4
Emma Bonney (ENG)	4
Ching Ching Yu (HKG)	1
So Man Yan (HKG)	0
Maria Catalano (ENG)	4

Semi-finals; Best of 7 frames
Reanne Evans (ENG)	4
Tatjana Vasiljeva (LAT)	0
Emma Bonney (ENG)	4
Maria Catalano (ENG)	3

Final; Best of 9 frames
Reanne Evans (ENG)	5
Emma Bonney (ENG)	1
