= 2002 World Ladies Snooker Championship =

Women's snooker event

2002 World Women's Snooker Championship
Tournament information
- Dates: April 2002
- Venue: Crucible Theatre (for the semi-finals and final)
- City: Sheffield
- Country: England
- Organisation: World Ladies Billiards and Snooker Association
- Format: Single elimination

Final
- Champion: Kelly Fisher (ENG)
- Runner-up: Lisa Quick (ENG)
- Score: 4–1

The 2002 World Ladies Snooker Championship was a women's snooker tournament. It was the 2002 edition of the World Women's Snooker Championship, first held in 1976.

The tournament was won by Kelly Fisher, who retained the title by defeating Lisa Quick 4–1 in the final. This was Fisher's fourth world title. The rounds before the semi-final were played at Jesters snooker club, Swindon, and the semi-finals and final were played at the Crucible Theatre.

== Main Draw ==
Best of 7 frames

Last 16
Lisa Quick (ENG)	4
Jenny Poulter (ENG)	0
Katie Henrick (ENG)	4
Maria Catalano (ENG)	2
Lisa Ingall (ENG)	4
Sharon Dickson (WAL)	3
Wendy Jans (BEL)	4
Margaret Gorski (AUS)	0
Lynette Horsburgh (SCO)	4
Michelle Brown (ENG)	1
'Reanne Evans (ENG)	4
Juliette Lushey (ENG)	1
Debbie Reynolds (ENG)	4
Emma Bonney (ENG)	2
Kelly Fisher (ENG)	4
Sarah Clarke (ENG)	0

Quarter-finals
Lisa Quick (ENG)	4
Katie Henrick (ENG)	2
Lisa Ingall (ENG)	3
Wendy Jans (BEL)	4
Lynette Horsburgh (SCO)	3
Reanne Evans (ENG)	4
Debbie Reynolds (ENG)	0
Kelly Fisher (ENG)	4

Semi-finals
Lisa Quick (ENG)	4
Wendy Jans (BEL)	0
Reanne Evans (ENG)	0
Kelly Fisher (ENG)	4

Final
Lisa Quick (ENG)	1
Kelly Fisher (ENG)	4
