= 2004–05 snooker season =

Details
- Duration: 4 August 2004 – 8 May 2005
- Tournaments: 19 (8 ranking events)

Triple Crown winners
- UK Championship: (Scotland) Stephen Maguire
- Masters: (England) Ronnie O'Sullivan
- World Championship: (England) Shaun Murphy

The 2004–05 snooker season was a series of snooker tournaments played between 4 August 2004 and 8 May 2005. The following table outlines the results for ranking events and the invitational events.

== Calendar ==
=== World Snooker Tour ===
Start	Finish	Country	Tournament name	Venue	City	Winner	Runner-up	Score	Ref.
2 Oct	10 Oct	ENG	Grand Prix	Guild Hall	Preston	(England) Ronnie O'Sullivan	(England) Ian McCulloch	9–5	
8 Nov	14 Nov	ENG	British Open	The Brighton Centre	Brighton	(Scotland) John Higgins	(Scotland) Stephen Maguire	9–6	
15 Nov	28 Nov	ENG	UK Championship	Barbican Centre	York	(Scotland) Stephen Maguire	(England) David Gray	10–1	
17 Jan	23 Jan	WAL	Welsh Open	Newport Centre	Newport	(England) Ronnie O'Sullivan	(Scotland) Stephen Hendry	9–8	
31 Jan	6 Feb	MLT	Malta Cup	Hilton Conference Center	Portomaso	(Scotland) Stephen Hendry	(Scotland) Graeme Dott	9–7	
13 Feb	20 Feb	ENG	Masters	Wembley Conference Centre	London	(England) Ronnie O'Sullivan	(Scotland) John Higgins	10–3	
6 Mar	13 Mar	IRL	Irish Masters	Citywest Hotel	Dublin	(England) Ronnie O'Sullivan	(Wales) Matthew Stevens	10–8	
27 Mar	3 Apr	CHN	China Open	Haidian Stadium	Beijing	(China) Ding Junhui	(Scotland) Stephen Hendry	9–5	
16 Apr	2 May	ENG	World Championship	Crucible Theatre	Sheffield	(England) Shaun Murphy	(Wales) Matthew Stevens	18–16	
6 Jan	8 May	ENG	Premier League	G-Mex Centre	Manchester	(England) Ronnie O'Sullivan	(Wales) Mark Williams	6–0	

Ranking event
Non-ranking event

=== World Ladies Billiards and Snooker Association ===
Start	Finish	Country	Tournament name	Venue	City	Winner	Runner-up	Score	Ref.
2 Sep	3 Sep	ENG	British Open	Woking Snooker Centre	Woking	(England) Reanne Evans	(England) Katie Henrick	4–0	
31 Oct	1 Nov	ENG	UK Ladies Championship	Northern Snooker Centre	Leeds	(Scotland) Lynette Horsburgh	(England) Reanne Evans	4–3	
5 Feb	5 Feb	ENG	Northern Championship	Regal Snooker Centre	Preston	(Scotland) Lynette Horsburgh	(England) Maria Catalano	4–2	
5 Mar	6 Mar	ENG	Connie Gough National	Rileys Snooker Club	Luton	(Scotland) Lynette Horsburgh	(England) Sarah Smith	3–1	
2 Apr	6 Apr	ENG	World Women's Championship	Cambridge Snooker Centre	Cambridge	(England) Reanne Evans	(Scotland) Lynette Horsburgh	6–4	

=== Challenge Tour ===
Start	Finish	Country	Tournament name	Venue	City	Winner	Runner-up	Score	Ref.
24 Sep	30 Sep	WAL	Challenge Tour 1	Pontin's	Prestatyn	(England) Jamie Cope	(England) Chris Norbury	6–2	
6 Dec	12 Dec	WAL	Challenge Tour 2	Pontin's	Prestatyn	(England) James Tatton	(England) Matthew Barnes	6–4	
15 Mar	21 Mar	WAL	Challenge Tour 3	Pontin's	Prestatyn	(Scotland) James McBain	(Northern Ireland) Mark Allen	6–3	
4 Apr	10 Apr	WAL	Challenge Tour 4	Pontin's	Prestatyn	(England) Jamie Cope	(England) Matthew Couch	6–0	

=== Other events ===
Start	Finish	Country	Tournament name	Venue	City	Winner	Runner-up	Score	Ref.
4 Aug	8 Aug	THA	World Champions v Asia Stars Challenge	BEC-Tero Hall	Bangkok	(Hong Kong) Marco Fu	(Scotland) John Higgins	5–1	
2 Sep	5 Sep	SUI	Swiss Open	Billiard Center Im Funken	Zofingen	(England) Ian McCulloch	(England) Jimmy White	5–1	
11 Sep	16 Sep	HKG	General Cup International	General Snooker Club	Tsim Sha Tsui	(Thailand) Issara Kachaiwong	(Wales) Dominic Dale	6–3	
18 Sep	19 Sep	GER	Grand Prix Fürth	Stadthalle	Fürth	(England) Paul Hunter	(Wales) Matthew Stevens	4–2	
18 Dec	19 Dec	NED	Dutch Open	De Dieze	's-Hertogenbosch	(Belgium) Bjorn Haneveer	(Netherlands) Lennon Starkey	6–1	

== Official rankings ==
The top 16 of the world rankings, these players automatically played in the final rounds of the world ranking events and were invited for the Masters.

No.	Ch.	Player	Points 2002/03	Points 2003/04	Total
1	▲	(England) Ronnie O'Sullivan	20125	26650	46775
2	▼	(Wales) Mark Williams	27550	16912	44462
3	▼	(Scotland) Stephen Hendry	20150	20800	40950
4	▲	(England) Paul Hunter	21450	18925	40375
5	▼	(Scotland) John Higgins	20275	16212	36487
6	▲	(Wales) Matthew Stevens	14875	18450	33325
7	▼	(Republic of Ireland) Ken Doherty	18975	13237	32212
8	▼	(England) Peter Ebdon	16025	15525	31550
9	▼	(England) Stephen Lee	16675	14025	30700
10	Steady	(Scotland) Alan McManus	16425	12825	29250
11	▲	(England) Jimmy White	9962	18175	28137
12	▲	(Scotland) Chris Small	15500	12050	27550
13	▼	(England) Steve Davis	15875	11212	27087
14	▼	(England) David Gray	14300	12612	26912
15	▼	(Scotland) Graeme Dott	11500	14812	26312
16	▲	(Hong Kong) Marco Fu	13850	12362	26212

== Points distribution ==
2004/2005 Points distribution for world ranking events, all new players received double points:

Tournament	Round →	L96	L80	L64	L48	L32	L16	QF	SF	F	W
Grand Prix	Unseeded loser	250	–	1000	–	1500	2050	2600	3150	3750	5000
Grand Prix	Seeded loser	–	–	500	–	–	–	–	–	–	–
British Open	Unseeded loser	200	650	900	1150	1450	1750	2050	2500	3000	4000
British Open	Seeded loser	–	325	450	575	725	–	–	–	–	–
UK Championship	Unseeded loser	300	975	1350	1725	2175	2625	3075	3750	4500	6000
UK Championship	Seeded loser	–	487	675	862	1087	–	–	–	–	–
Welsh Open	Unseeded loser	200	650	900	1150	1450	1750	2050	2500	3000	4000
Welsh Open	Seeded loser	–	325	450	575	725	–	–	–	–	–
Malta Cup	Unseeded loser	200	650	900	1150	1450	1750	2050	2500	3000	4000
Malta Cup	Seeded loser	–	325	450	575	725	–	–	–	–	–
Irish Masters	Unseeded loser	200	650	900	1150	1450	1750	2050	2500	3000	4000
Irish Masters	Seeded loser	–	325	450	575	725	–	–	–	–	–
China Open	Unseeded loser	200	650	900	1150	1450	1750	2050	2500	3000	4000
China Open	Seeded loser	–	325	450	575	725	–	–	–	–	–
World Championship	Unseeded loser	400	1300	1800	2300	2900	3500	4100	5000	6000	8000
World Championship	Seeded loser	–	650	900	1150	1450	–	–	–	–	–
