= 2005 World Women's Snooker Championship =

Women's World Snooker Championship
Tournament information
- Venue: Cambridge Snooker Centre
- Country: United Kingdom
- Organisation: World Ladies Billiards and Snooker Association
- Format: Single elimination
- Winner's share: £1500

Final
- Champion: (England) Reanne Evans
- Runner-up: (Scotland) Lynette Horsburgh
- Score: 6–4

The 2005 Women's World Snooker Championship was a women's snooker tournament played in the United Kingdom in 2005. Reanne Evans beat Lynette Horsburgh 6–4 in the final to win her first world title.

== Tournament summary ==
Kelly Fisher was the reigning champion, having won the 2003 Championship, as the Women's World Championship was not held in 2004, but did not participate, having left snooker to play on the pool circuit in the United States. The tournament was played at the Cambridge Snooker Centre.

The third frame of the final between reigning IBSF World Women's Snooker Champion Reanne Evans and Lynette Horsburgh was replayed due to a scoring error. Evans won the replayed frame went on to win the match 6–4, taking the last four frames after being 2–4 behind. Evans received £1,500 in prize money as champion, and Horsburgh received £750 as runner-up. The losing semi-finalists received £300 each

Horsburgh also lost in the final of the 2005 World Women's Billiards Championship, held at the same venue.

== Main draw ==
Quarter-finals onwards shown below. Source: Snooker Scene

Quarter-finals; Best-of-9 frames
(England) Maria Catalano	5
(England) Katie Henrick	4
(Scotland) Lynette Horsburgh	5
(England) June Banks	2
(England) Sarah Smith	5
(England) Emma Bonney	4
(England) Reanne Evans	5
(Bulgaria) Michelle Marinova	0

Semi-finals; Best-of-9 frames
(England) Maria Catalano	3
(Scotland) Lynette Horsburgh	5
(England) Sarah Smith	2
(England) Reanne Evans	5

Final; Best-of-11 frames
(Scotland) Lynette Horsburgh	4
(England) Reanne Evans	6
