= 2006 World Women's Snooker Championship =

Women's World Snooker Championship
Tournament information
- Venue: Cambridge Snooker Centre
- Country: United Kingdom
- Organisation: World Ladies Billiards and Snooker Association
- Format: Single elimination
- Winner's share: £800
- Highest break: 78 (Reanne Evans, Emma Bonney)

Final
- Champion: (England) Reanne Evans
- Runner-up: Emma Bonney
- Score: 5–3

The 2006 Women's World Snooker Championship was a women's snooker tournament played in the United Kingdom in 2006. Defending champion Reanne Evans beat Emma Bonney 5–3 in the final to win her second world title.

== Tournament summary ==
Reanne Evans was the reigning champion, having won the 2005 World Women's Snooker Championship. The 2006 tournament was played at the Cambridge Snooker Centre, the same venue as the 2005 championship. Evans was eight months pregnant during the tournament.

Evans received £800 in prize money as champion, and Bonney received £400 as runner-up. The losing semi-finalists received £200 each, and losing quarter-finalists £100 each.

Other events were held at the same venue alongside the women's snooker world championship. Bonney also lost in the final of the 2005 World Women's Billiards Championship, 164–193 to Chitra Magimairaj. Evans won the mixed doubles snooker tournament with her partner Mark Allen, Jenny Poulter won the seniors event, and Suzie Opacic won the juniors event.

== Main draw ==
Quarter-finals onward shown below. Source: Snooker Scene

Quarter-finals; Best-of-7 frames
(England) Reanne Evans	4
(India) Meenal Thakur	2
(India) Anuja Thakur	4
(India) Chitra Magimairaj	1
(England) Emma Bonney	4
(India) Vidya Pillai	0
(England) Maria Catalano	4
(England) Tina Owen-Sevilton	0

Semi-finals; Best-of-7 frames
(England) Reanne Evans	4
(India) Anuja Thakur	2
(England) Emma Bonney	4
(England) Maria Catalano	3

Final; Best-of-9 frames
(England) Reanne Evans	5
(England) Emma Bonney	3
