= Maria Catalano =

English former snooker player

Personal information
- Born: 27 February 1982 (age 44)

Sport
- Country: England
- Sport: Snooker
- Highest ranking: World Women's Snooker: 1

Maria Catalano (born 27 February 1982) is an English former snooker player from Dudley. She took up the sport at 15 and received coaching from her first cousin, professional player Ronnie O'Sullivan. She made her World Women's Snooker Tour debut in 1998 and went on to win 11 women's ranking titles, including the 2007 British Women's Open and the 2012 UK Women's Championship. A five-time runner-up at the World Women's Snooker Championship, she was ranked number one in the women's world rankings during the 2013–14 season.

With playing partner Reanne Evans, Catalano won the World Women's Pairs Championship in 2018. She reached the final stages of the World Seniors Championship in 2022, the first female player to do so. After Jamie Hunter's victory at the 2022 US Women's Open, Catalano ceased playing in protest at the WPBSA's stance on transgender players in women's snooker.

== Career ==
Catalano attended secondary school at Hillcrest Community College, Netherton, West Midlands. She began playing snooker in working men's clubs when she was 15 and received coaching from her first cousin, professional player Ronnie O'Sullivan. She made her World Women's Snooker Tour debut in 1998. She has since won 11 women's ranking titles, including the Connie Gough Trophy six times, the 2007 British Women's Open, and the 2012 UK Women's Championship. In 2003, she ended Kelly Fisher's 69-match, two-year winning streak on the women's tour by defeating her 3–1 in the quarter-finals of the East Anglian Open. In 2011, she ended Reanne Evans's record 90-match, three-year winning streak with a 3–1 victory in the semi-finals of the Northern Championship.

A five-time runner-up in the World Women's Snooker Championship, Catalano lost the 2009, 2010, 2012, and 2013 finals to Reanne Evans and the 2018 final to Ng On-yee. At the 2012 event, she made her highest break on the women's tour, a 116 in her semi-final match against Tatjana Vasiljeva. She was ranked world number one on the women's tour during the 2013–14 season. She and Vasiljeva were runners-up in the World Women's Pairs Championship in 2016; she and Reanne Evans won the event in 2018, defeating Laura Evans and Suzie Opacic 3–0 in the final. Her form declined after 2018, which she attributed to her father's death in that year, commenting in 2022 that "it’s been a constant struggle since then" and saying she had been "finding it difficult to practice, just feeling I was getting nothing out of it." In May 2022, she became the first woman to compete in the final stages of the World Seniors Championship at the Crucible Theatre, having reached the eligible age of 40 in February of that year. She lost 0–3 to Wael Talaat but made a half-century break in the final frame.

Catalano had long expressed her belief that men held innate advantages over women in snooker. In 2014, after six-time world champion Steve Davis suggested that women lacked the "single-minded, obsessional type of brain" needed to succeed at the elite levels of the sport, Catalano agreed, saying, "I don't think women will ever compete with men at the top level". In August 2022, after transgender player Jamie Hunter won the inaugural US Women’s Open, Catalano called for transgender players to be banned from women's tournaments, saying "if this is allowed and becomes more common, there is no future for women’s snooker." Jason Ferguson, chairman of the World Professional Billiards and Snooker Association, responded that no such ban would be implemented, saying: "We have taken sufficient medical advice to be very satisfied that our policy is right for the current climate." Catalano ceased playing in 2022 in protest against the WPBSA's stance, stating that she was standing up for "unfairness" against cisgender women.

In April 2025, following the UK Supreme Court decision in For Women Scotland Ltd v The Scottish Ministers, the WPBSA stated that it would review its policy on transgender players. Catalano said she would return to the sport if the rules were changed, saying: “I would love to go back. Snooker is in the blood.” She claimed that she had consistently been "shut down" by the WPBSA and its chairman Ferguson, said she felt "unheard," and alleged that other players were "frightened to say anything because they know they can get banned.” A WPBSA spokesperson stated: "The World Women's Snooker Tour is a welcoming environment. Maria Catalano remains welcome at World Women's Snooker Tour events, as has always been the case." The following year, the WPBSA changed its policy on transgender players, limiting participation in women's tournaments to players born biologically female. The changes affect tournaments sanctioned by the WPBSA with effect from 12 March 2026.

== Personal life ==
Her father, Antonio Catalano, was the brother of Ronnie O'Sullivan's mother, Maria O'Sullivan (née Catalano), making the two players first cousins. She was named Maria after Ronnie O'Sullivan's mother, while Ronnie O'Sullivan was given the middle name Antonio after her father. Following her father's death from cancer in 2018, she shaved her head on the eve of the 2018 UK Women's Championship to raise funds for the Macmillan Cancer Support charity. She works in her family's ice-cream business.

== Performance timeline ==
World Women's Snooker

Tournament	1997/ 98	1998/ 99	1999/ 00	2000/ 01	2001/ 02	2002/ 03	2003/ 04	2004/ 05	2005/ 06	2006/ 07	2007/ 08	2008/ 09	2009/ 10	2010/ 11	2011/ 12	2012/ 13	2013/ 14	2014/ 15	2015/ 16	2016/ 17	2017/ 18	2018/ 19	2019/ 20	2020/ 21	2021/ 22	2022/ 23	2023/ 24	2024/ 25
Current tournaments
UK Championship	A	LQ	2R	SF	QF	QF	NH	SF	F	A	F	F	F	F	SF	W	F	A	QF	QF	SF	1R	F	NH	QF	2R	A	A
US Open	Tournament Not Held																									A	A	A
Australian Open	Tournament Not Held																						A	A	NH	A	A	A
Scottish Open	Tournament Not Held					F	Tournament Not Held																			A	A	A
Masters	Tournament Not Held										SF	SF	F	F	Not Held		F	SF	SF	QF	SF	1R	SF	NH	SF	2R	A	A
Belgian Open	Not Held			1R	QF	Tournament Not Held																A	QF	Not Held		A	A	A
Asia-Pacific Championship	Tournament Not Held																									A	NH	NH
World Championship	1R	2R	2R	QF	1R	QF	NH	SF	SF	QF	SF	F	F	SF	F	F	QF	A	1R	1R	F	A	Not Held		2R	QF	A	
British Open	3R	1R	2R	QF	F	SF	NH	A	A	A	W	QF	SF	1R	Not Held		A	Not Held			1R	Not Held			SF	QF	A	
Former tournaments
National Championship	A	QF	Tournament Not Held																									
Grand Prix	A	2R	2R	1R	Tournament Not Held																							
Scottish Masters	A	2R	2R	QF	QF	1R	Tournament Not Held																					
LG Cup	Tournament Not Held				QF	1R	Tournament Not Held																					
European Masters (Note: The event was called the European Open (2002/2003))	Tournament Not Held					QF	Tournament Not Held															A	Not Held					
Welsh Open	A	2R	2R	1R	QF	QF	Tournament Not Held																					
East Anglian Championship	Tournament Not Held								A	1R	A	F	W	SF	W	Tournament Not Held												
Northern Championship	Tournament Not Held							F	W	Tournament Not Held					W	F	Tournament Not Held											
Southern Championship (Note: The event was called the South Coast Classic (2006/07–2009/10))	Tournament Not Held									F	QF	F	F	F	1R	NH	F	Tournament Not Held										
Eden Classic	Tournament Not Held																	F	QF	Tournament Not Held								
Connie Gough Trophy (Note: The event was called the Connie Gough Memorial (1997/98–1998/99, 2002/03 & 2011/12–2014/15) and Connie Gough National (1999/00–2001/02 & 2004/05–2010/11))	1R	2R	3R	QF	QF	1R	QF	SF	W	W	W	SF	F	SF	W	W	F	F	A	W	Tournament Not Held							
Paul Hunter Classic	Tournament Not Held																			SF	QF	Tournament Not Held						
10-Red World Championship	Tournament Not Held																				2R	QF	QF	Not Held				
6-Red World Championship	Tournament Not Held																				QF	QF	QF	Not Held				

Performance Table Legend
LQ	lost in the qualifying draw	#R	lost in the early rounds of the tournament (WR = Wildcard round, RR = Round robin)	QF	lost in the quarter-finals
SF	lost in the semi-finals	F	lost in the final	W	won the tournament
DNQ	did not qualify for the tournament	A	did not participate in the tournament	WD	withdrew from the tournament

NH / Not Held	means an event was not held.
NR / Non-Ranking Event	means an event is/was no longer a ranking event.
R / Ranking Event	means an event is/was a ranking event.
MR / Minor-Ranking Event	means an event is/was a minor-ranking event.
PA / Pro-am Event	means an event is/was a pro-am event.

== Titles and achievements ==
Outcome	No.	Year	Championship	Opponent	Score	Ref.
Runner-up	1	2001	British Open	Kelly Fisher	0–4	
Runner-up	2	2003	Scottish Open	Wendy Jans	1–4	
Runner-up	3	2005	Northern Championship	Lynette Horsburgh	2–4	
Runner-up	4	2005	WLBSA' UK championship	Reanne Evans	0–4	
Winner	5	2006	Northern Championship	June Banks	4–1	
Winner	6	2006	Connie Gough National	Reanne Evans	4–3	
Winner	7	2006	Regal Ladies Championship	June Banks	4–1	
Winner	8	2007	British Championship	June Banks		
Winner	9	2007	Connie Gough National	June Banks	3–1	
Winner	10	2007	British Open	Emma Bonney	3–2	
Runner-up	11	2007	South Coast Classic	Reanne Evans	2–4	
Winner	12	2008	Connie Gough National	Reanne Evans	3–2	
Runner-up	13	2008	East Anglian Championship	Reanne Evans	0–3	
Runner-up	14	2008	UK Ladies Championship	Reanne Evans	1–3	
Runner-up	15	2009	WLBSA World Ladies' Championship	Reanne Evans	2–5	
Runner-up	16	2009	South Coast Classic	Reanne Evans	0–3	
Runner-up	17	2009	East Anglian Championship	Reanne Evans	0–3	
Runner-up	18	2009	UK Ladies Championship	Reanne Evans	1–3	
Runner-up	19	2010	WLBSA World Ladies' World Championship	Reanne Evans	1–5	
Runner-up	20	2010	Connie Gough National	Reanne Evans	1–3	
Runner-up	21	2010	South Coast Classic	Reanne Evans	1–3	
Runner-up	22	2010	UK Ladies Championship	Reanne Evans	0–3	
Runner-up	23	2010	East Anglian Championship	Reanne Evans	0–3	
Winner	24	2011	Northern Championship	Ching Ching Yu	3–1	
Winner	25	2011	East Anglian Championship	Katie Henrick	3–0	
Winner	26	2012	Connie Gough Memorial	Jaique Ip	3–0	
Runner-up	27	2012	WLBSA World Ladies' World Championship	Reanne Evans	3–5	
Winner	28	2012	UK Ladies Championship	Tina Owen-Sevilton	3–0	
Runner-up	29	2013	WLBSA World Ladies' World Championship	Reanne Evans	3–6	
Winner	30	2013	Connie Gough Memorial	Emma Bonney	3–0	
Runner-up	31	2013	Eden Resources Masters	Reanne Evans	0–4	
Runner-up	32	2013	UK Ladies Championship	Ng On-yee	2–4	
Runner-up	33	2014	Connie Gough Trophy	Reanne Evans	0–4	
Runner-up	34	2014	Southern Classic	Ng On-yee	1–4	
Runner-up	35	2014	Eden Classic	Reanne Evans	3–5	
Runner-up	36	2016	Connie Gough Trophy	Reanne Evans	0–4	
Winner	37	2017	Connie Gough Trophy	Rebecca Kenna	4–2	
Runner-up	38	2018	Women's World Snooker Championship	Ng On-yee	0–5	
Runner-up	39	2019	UK Women's Snooker Championship	Reanne Evans	2–4	
