= World Women's Snooker Championship =

Tournament on the World Women's Snooker Tour

Tournament information
- Venue: Changping Snooker Center
- Location: Dongguan
- Country: China
- Established: 1976
- Organisation(s): World Women's Snooker; CBSA
- Total prize fund: £42,000
- Recent edition: 2026

The World Women's Snooker Championship (known as the Women's World Open from 1976 to 1981 and the World Ladies Snooker Championship from 1983 to 2018) is the longest-running and most prestigious tournament on the World Women's Snooker Tour. Staged 41 times since the inaugural edition in 1976, it has produced 15 different champions, six of whom have won the title more than once.

The most successful player in the tournament's history has been Reanne Evans, who has won 12 titles, followed by Allison Fisher with seven titles and Kelly Fisher with five. The inaugural champion was Vera Selby, who won the title twice. Although the tournament had only one winner from outside the United Kingdom before 2014 (Australia's Lesley McIlrath in 1980) most recent editions have been won by Asian players. Hong Kong's Ng On-yee won three titles, in 2015, 2017 and 2018. Thai players Mink Nutcharut and Baipat Siripaporn won in 2022 and 2023 respectively, and China's Bai Yulu claimed her first title in 2024 and a second in 2025.

In 2021, the World Women’s Snooker Tour became an official qualification route to the main professional World Snooker Tour. At the end of each season, the reigning World Women's Snooker Champion receives a professional tour card for the following two seasons, as does the highest-ranked player in the women's rankings who is not already on the tour. If the World Champion is already on the tour, that card will be issued to the next highest ranked player who is not on the tour.

== History ==
Founded in 1931, the Women's Billiards Association (WBA) organised an amateur women's snooker championship that took place most years from 1933 until the 1970s. The WBA also held the Women's Professional Snooker Championship annually from 1934 to 1941 and 1947 to 1950, but then discontinued it due to lack of public interest. The standard of amateur women's snooker was generally perceived as poor throughout the 1930s, but women's participation improved in the postwar era, including the formation of women's snooker leagues, producing improvements in the quality of play. The billiard trade company Burroughes and Watts often supported women's competitions, but that support ended after sporting goods firm Riley took over the company in 1967. The number of competitions reduced, and the amateur championship lacked sponsorship and suffered from poor organisation.

In 1976, the Women's Billiards and Snooker Association was established. The Q Promotions company run by Maurice Hayes gained sponsorship from tobacco brand Embassy for a 1976 Women's World Open, as part of Embassy's deal to sponsor the 1976 World Snooker Championship. Over sixty players entered, including former amateur champions Maureen Baynton and Rosemary Davies, who both came out of retirement, and Joyce Gardner, runner-up in the professional championships of 1934, 1935 and 1937. Held at Middlesbrough Town Hall, the 1976 championship is recognised today by World Women's Snooker as the first edition of the World Women's Snooker Championship. Vera Selby, the reigning amateur champion for four seasons before the tournament, defeated Muriel Hazeldene 4–0 in the final and won £500 plus a Jaeger-LeCoultre watch worth another £500.

The next edition took place in 1980, when 46 players entered. Australian player Lesley McIlrath won the final 4–2 over Agnes Davies, who had won the Women's Professional Snooker Championship in 1949. The tournament was staged again the following year, 1981, when Selby regained her title with a 3–0 victory over Mandy Fisher in the final. The first three championships were governed by the Women's Billiards and Snooker Association, but from 1983 the championship was controlled by the World Ladies Billiards and Snooker Association (WLBSA), which was closely associated with Ladies Snooker International, a management and promotions company that had signed many of the leading female players.

In 1984, the WLBSA held an amateur championship, won by 15-year-old Stacey Hillyard, and a five-tournament Grand Prix series, won by Mandy Fisher. The latter is now regarded as an edition of the World Women's Snooker Championship. The 1985 Amateur Championship attracted 78 entries and was won by Allison Fisher, who lost only one frame during the tournament; this is recognised today as the 1985 edition of the tournament. The WLBSA abolished the distinction between amateur and professional status the following year. Fisher went on to win a further six world titles, most recently in 1994.

Barry Hearn's Matchroom company promoted the 1990 World Championship, with sponsorship from Trusthouse Forte and a total prize fund of £30,000, including £10,000 for the champion. The previous record for the tournament prize fund had been £10,000, with £3,500 for the winner. It was the first event in Matchroom's five-year deal with the WLBSA, which guaranteed at least £50,000 in world championship prize money across five years. Karen Corr won the title in 1990, 1995 and 1997; and Kelly Fisher won the title five times in six years from 1998 to 2003. Dissatisfied with her earnings from the game, Allison Fisher left the snooker circuit in 1997 to compete on the WPBA nine-ball pool tour in the United States. Both Corr and Kelly Fisher later followed that route.

In 1994, the quarter-finals, semi-finals and final were held in New Delhi, India, the tournament's first staging outside the United Kingdom. The prize money was reduced in 1994, and again in 1995, when the final stages were again held in New Delhi. During the next edition, which extended from 1996 into 1997 due to delays in scheduling the final rounds, Hearn requested the termination of the contract with the WLBSA to promote the event in future.

In 1997, the World Professional Billiards and Snooker Association (WPBSA) took over the WLBSA, pledging to provide additional prize money. From 1998 to 2003, Embassy sponsored the tournament, with the semi-finals and final taking place at the Crucible Theatre in Sheffield during the World Snooker Championship. The WPBSA ceased supporting the women's circuit in 2003, following the UK government's restrictions on tobacco sponsorship of sport, and the championship was not held in 2004.

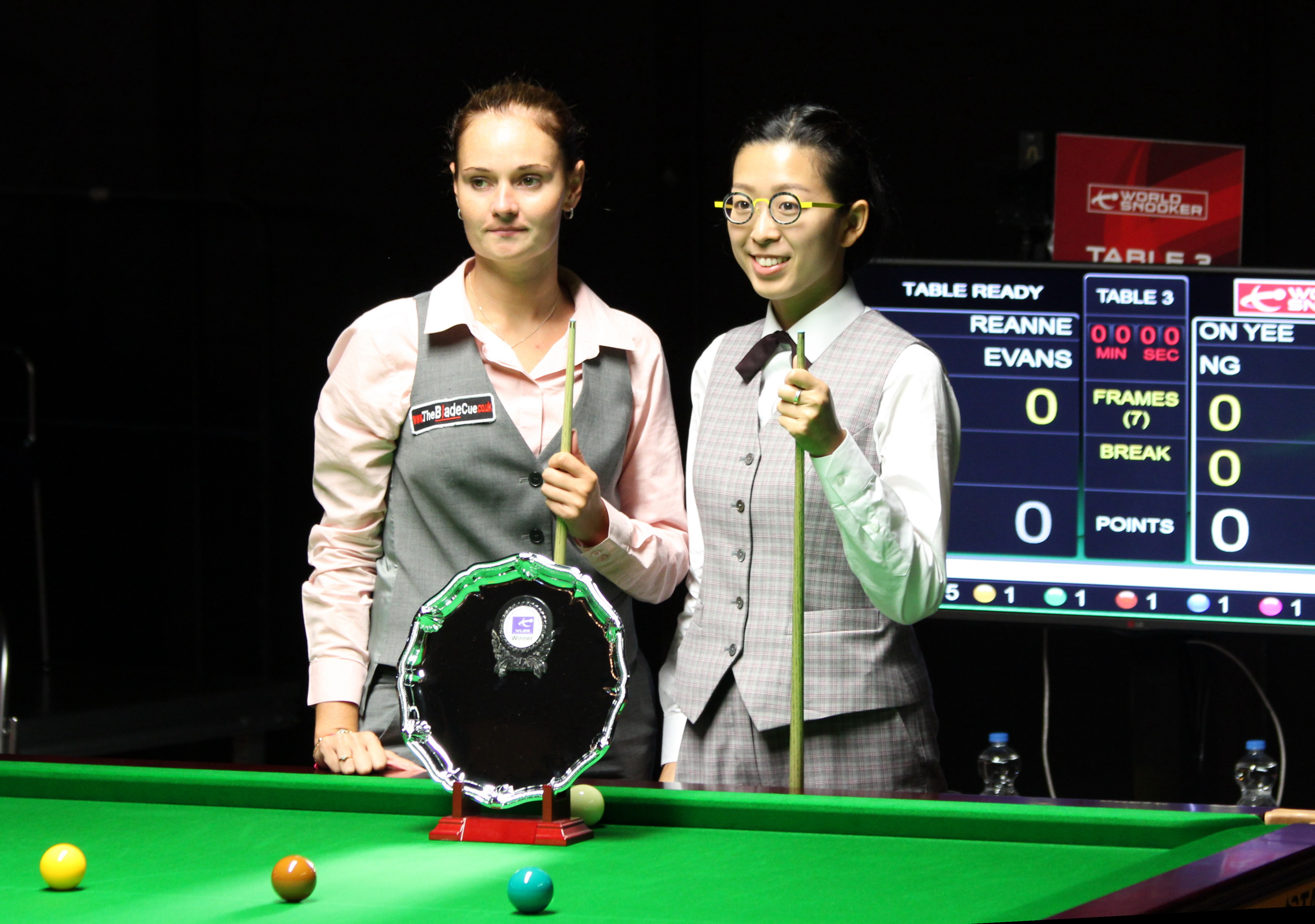
Reanne Evans (left) has won a record twelve World Women's Snooker Championship titles; Ng On-yee (right) has won the title three times.

The tournament was revived in 2005. Since then, its most successful competitor has been Reanne Evans, who has won the title a record 12 times, including ten consecutive victories from 2005 to 2014 followed by further titles in 2016 and 2019. Hong Kong's Ng On-yee became the tournament's first Asian winner in 2015, adding further titles in 2017 and 2018. The 2017 event was held in Toa Payoh, Singapore, the first time since 1995 that the tournament was held outside the UK. In 2018, the World Ladies Billiards and Snooker Association was rebranded as World Women's Snooker, and the tournament was renamed the World Women's Snooker Championship.

The tournament was not staged in 2020 and 2021 due to the COVID-19 pandemic. In 2021, the tournament's trophy was renamed the Mandy Fisher Trophy. Fisher founded the World Ladies Billiards and Snooker Association in 1981, won the women's world title in 1984, and, as of March 2024, serves as president of World Women's Snooker.

Beginning in 2021, the World Women's Snooker Tour became an official qualification pathway to the World Snooker Tour. The World Women's Champion automatically receives a professional tour card for the following two seasons, although if she already holds a place on the professional tour, the next highest ranked player not on tour will receive a place. The 2022 and 2023 tournaments were won respectively by Thai players Mink Nutcharut and Baipat Siripaporn, ending a 19-year period in which every world title had been won either by Evans or Ng. China hosted the event for the first time in 2024, with the tournament staged in Dongguan. Bai Yulu defeated Nutcharut 6–5 in the final, becoming the first winner from mainland China.

The highest break in the history of the tournament is 127 by Bai in the group stages of the 2023 event.

Ann-Marie Farren, who was aged 16 years and 47 days when she won the title in 1987, is recognised by Guinness World Records as the tournament's youngest winner as of 2024, although Hillyard was only 15 when she won the 1984 amateur championship.

== Winners ==
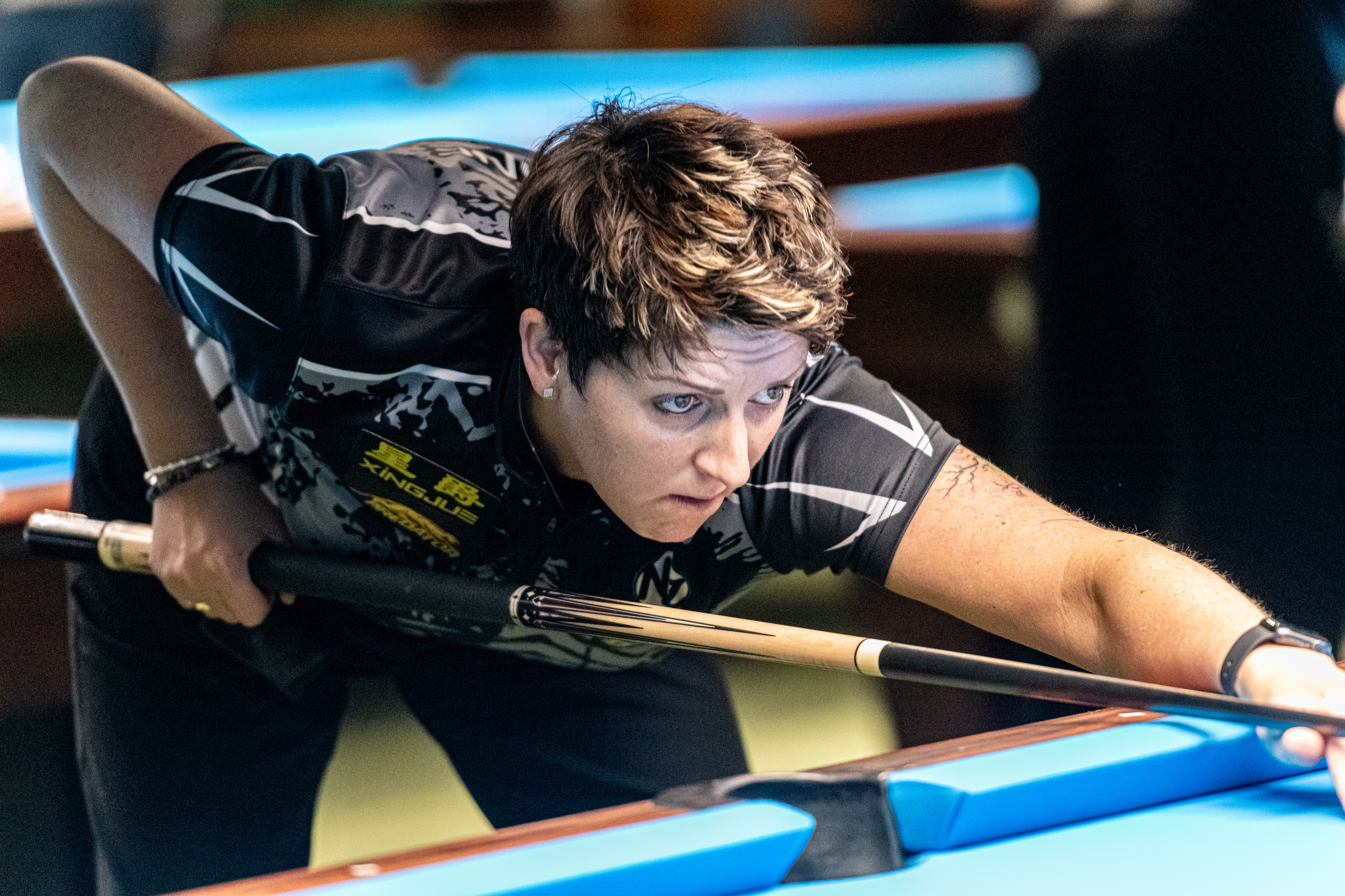
Kelly Fisher pictured in 2022) won the Championship five times. She has also won world titles in English billiards, Ten-ball pool, and Nine-ball pool.

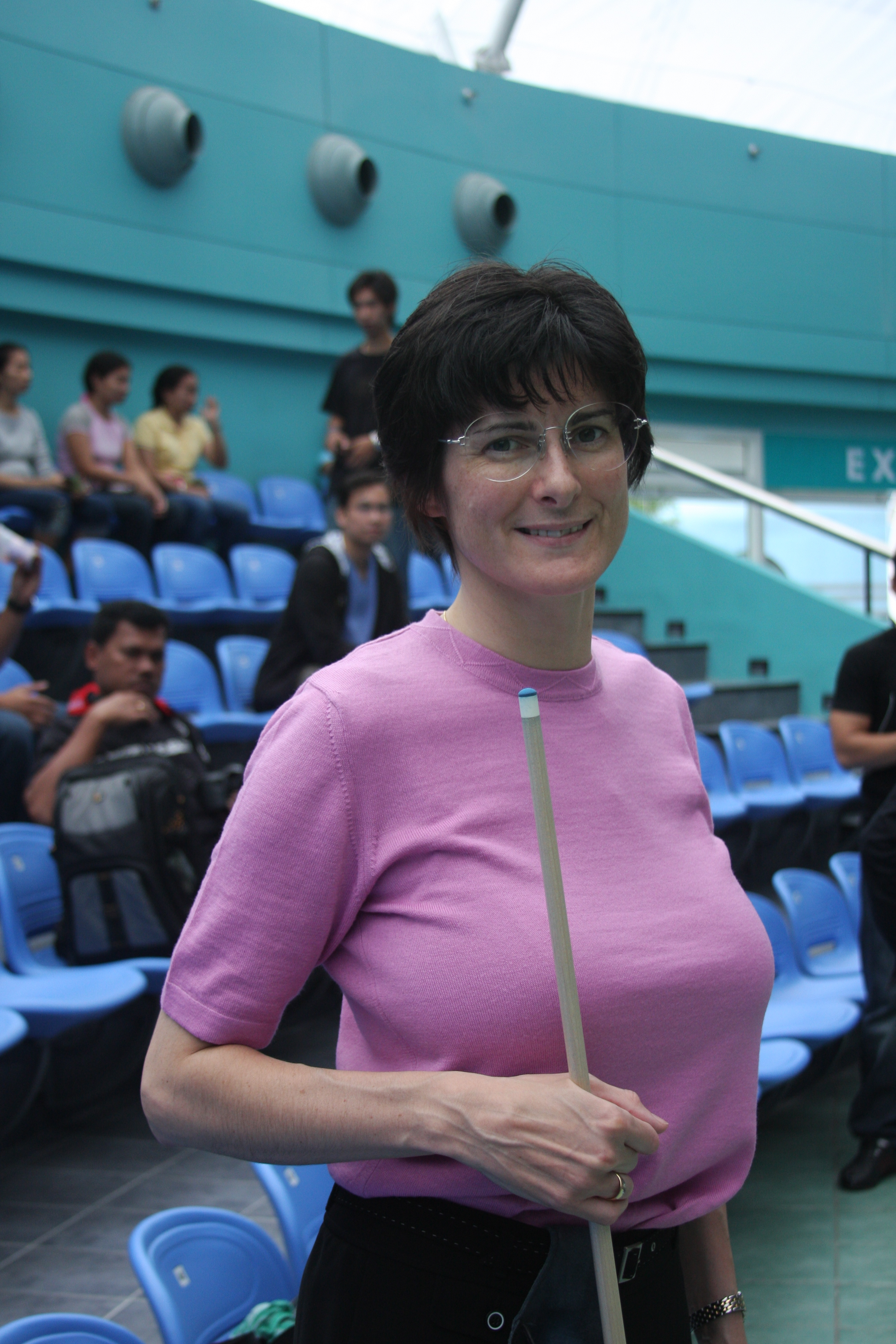
Three-time World Women's Snooker champion Karen Corr pictured in 2009), is another former English billiards world champion. Like Allison Fisher and Kelly Fisher, she moved to the United States to compete on the pool circuit.

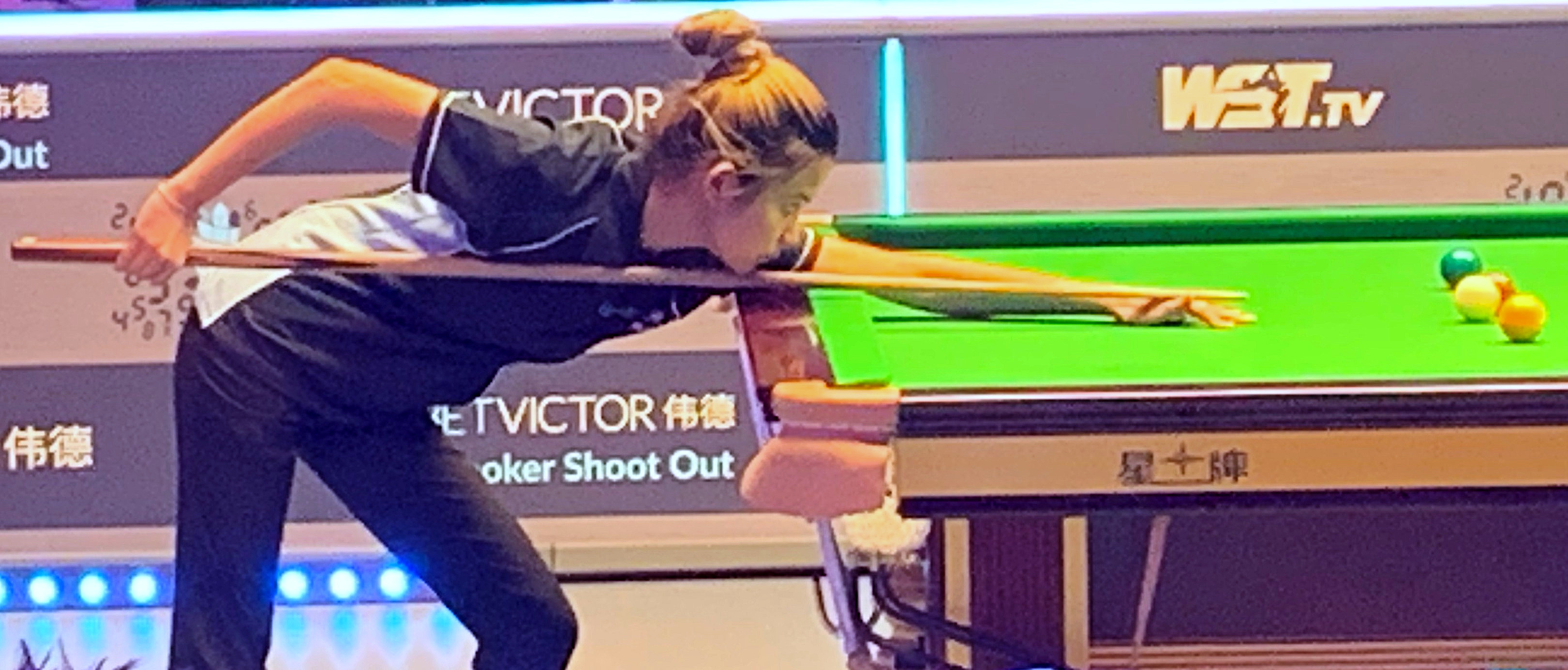
Mink Nutcharut was runner-up in 2025, having previously won in 2022 and reached the final in 2019 and 2024.

World Women's Snooker Championship finals
Year	Winner	Runner-up	Final score	City	Ref.
1976	Vera Selby (ENG)	Muriel Hazeldene (ENG)	4–0	Middlesbrough (ENG)	
1977–1979	No tournament held				
1980	Lesley McIlrath (AUS)	Agnes Davies (WAL)	4–2	Hayling Island (ENG)	
1981	Vera Selby (ENG)	Mandy Fisher (ENG)	3–0	Thorness Bay (ENG)	
1982	No tournament held				
1983	Sue Foster (ENG)	Maureen Baynton (ENG)	8–5	Brean (ENG)	
1984 Am	Stacey Hillyard (ENG)	Natalie Stelmach (CAN)	4–1	Coventry (ENG)	
1984 Pro	Mandy Fisher (ENG)	Maryann McConnell (CAN)	4–2	Birmingham (ENG)	
1985 Am	Allison Fisher (ENG)	Stacey Hillyard (ENG)	5–1	Solihull (ENG)	
1986	Allison Fisher (ENG)	Sue LeMaich (CAN)	5–0	Solihull (ENG)	
1987	Ann-Marie Farren (ENG)	Stacey Hillyard (ENG)	5–1	Puckpool (ENG)	
1988	Allison Fisher (ENG)	Ann-Marie Farren (ENG)	6–1	Brixham (ENG)	
1989	Allison Fisher (ENG)	Ann-Marie Farren (ENG)	6–5	Brixham (ENG)	
1990	Karen Corr (NIR)	Stacey Hillyard (ENG)	7–4	London (ENG)	
1991	Allison Fisher (ENG)	Karen Corr (NIR)	8–2	London (ENG)	
1992	No tournament held				
1993	Allison Fisher (ENG)	Stacey Hillyard (ENG)	9–3	Blackpool (ENG)	
1994	Allison Fisher (ENG)	Stacey Hillyard (ENG)	7–3	New Delhi (IND)	
1995	Karen Corr (NIR)	Kim Shaw (ENG)	6–3	New Delhi (IND)	
1996	No tournament held (Note: A championship was started in 1996 but did not conclude until 1997 and is recorded as the 1997 Championship.)				
1997	Karen Corr (NIR)	Kelly Fisher (ENG)	6–3	Llanelli (WAL)	
1998	Kelly Fisher (ENG)	Karen Corr (NIR)	5–0	Sheffield (ENG)	
1999	Kelly Fisher (ENG)	Karen Corr (NIR)	4–2	Sheffield (ENG)	
2000	Kelly Fisher (ENG)	Lisa Ingall (ENG)	4–1	Sheffield (ENG)	
2001	Lisa Quick (ENG)	Lynette Horsburgh (SCO)	4–2	Sheffield (ENG)	
2002	Kelly Fisher (ENG)	Lisa Quick (ENG)	4–1	Sheffield (ENG)	
2003	Kelly Fisher (ENG)	Lisa Quick (ENG)	4–1	Sheffield (ENG)	
2004	No tournament held				
2005	Reanne Evans (ENG)	Lynette Horsburgh (SCO)	6–4	Cambridge (ENG)	
2006	Reanne Evans (ENG)	Emma Bonney (ENG)	5–3	Cambridge (ENG)	
2007	Reanne Evans (ENG)	Katie Henrick (ENG)	5–3	Cambridge (ENG)	
2008	Reanne Evans (ENG)	June Banks (ENG)	5–2	Cambridge (ENG)	
2009	Reanne Evans (ENG)	Maria Catalano (ENG)	5–2	Cambridge (ENG)	
2010	Reanne Evans (ENG)	Maria Catalano (ENG)	5–1	Cambridge (ENG)	
2011	Reanne Evans (ENG)	Emma Bonney (ENG)	5–1	Bury St Edmunds (ENG)	
2012	Reanne Evans (ENG)	Maria Catalano (ENG)	5–3	Cambridge (ENG)	
2013	Reanne Evans (ENG)	Maria Catalano (ENG)	6–3	Cambridge (ENG)	
2014	Reanne Evans (ENG)	Ng On-yee (HKG)	6–0	Leeds (ENG)	
2015	Ng On-yee (HKG)	Emma Bonney (ENG)	6–2	Leeds (ENG)	
2016	Reanne Evans (ENG)	Ng On-yee (HKG)	6–4	Leeds (ENG)	
2017	Ng On-yee (HKG)	Vidya Pillai (IND)	6–5	Toa Payoh (SGP)	
2018	Ng On-yee (HKG)	Maria Catalano (ENG)	5–0	St. Paul's Bay (MLT)	
2019	Reanne Evans (ENG)	Mink Nutcharut (THA)	6–3	Bangkok (THA)	
2020–2021	Cancelled due to the COVID-19 pandemic				
2022	Mink Nutcharut (THA)	Wendy Jans (BEL)	6–5	Sheffield (ENG)	
2023	Baipat Siripaporn (THA)	Bai Yulu (CHN)	6–3	Bangkok (THA)	
2024	Bai Yulu (CHN)	Mink Nutcharut (THA)	6–5	Dongguan (CHN)	
2025	Bai Yulu (CHN)	Mink Nutcharut (THA)	6–4	Dongguan (CHN)	
2026	Panchaya Channoi (THA)	Reanne Evans (ENG)	6–2	Dongguan (CHN)	

== Statistics by player ==
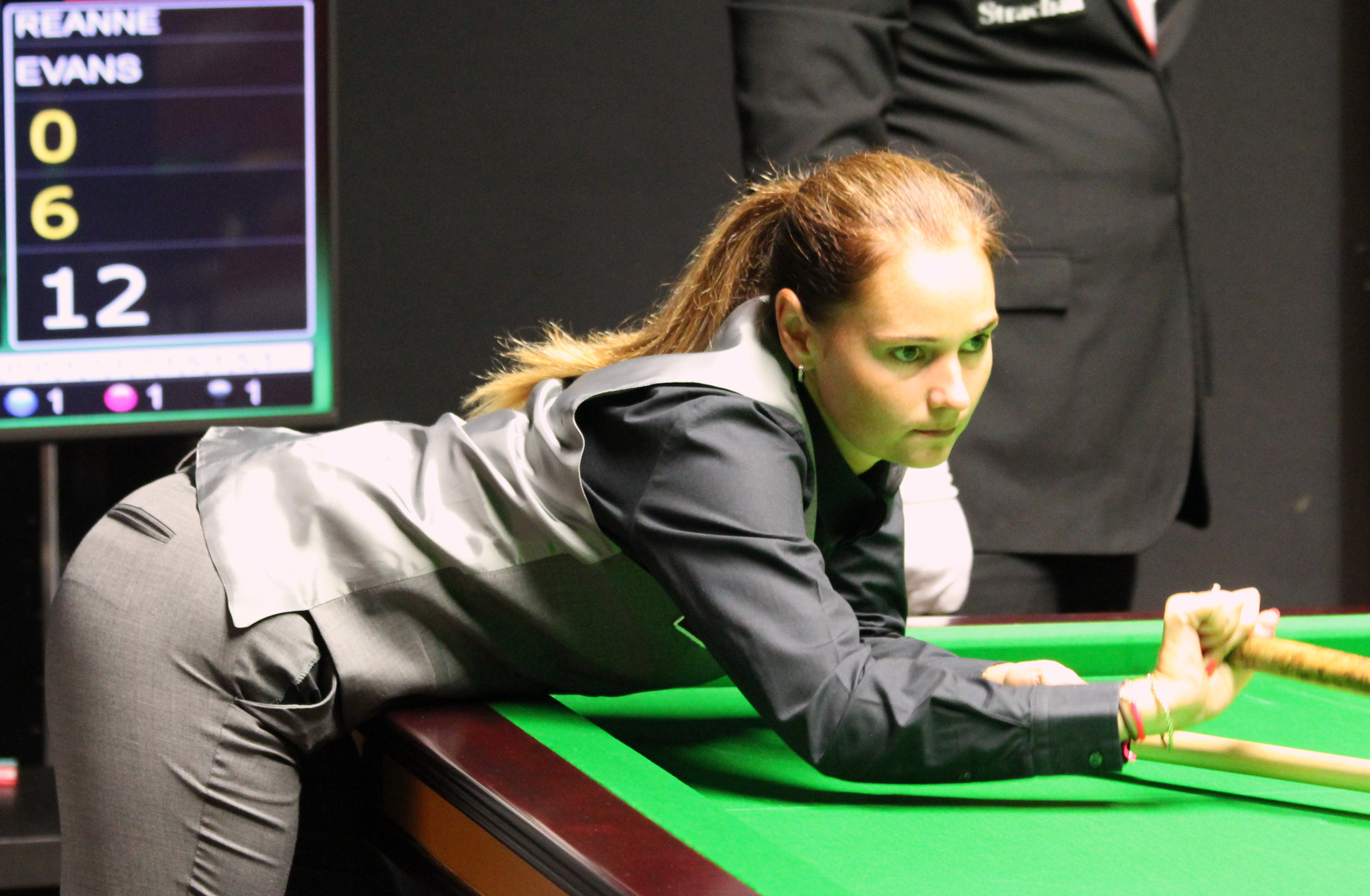
Reanne Evans has won twelve out of thirteen finals that she has contested.

Rank	Name	Nationality	Winner	Runner-up
1	**Reanne Evans**	England	12	1
2	Allison Fisher	England	7	0
3	Kelly Fisher	England	5	1
4	Karen Corr	Northern Ireland	3	3
5	**Ng On Yee**	Hong Kong	3	2
6	**Bai Yulu**	China	2	1
7	Vera Selby	England	2	0
8	Stacey Hillyard	England	1	5
9	**Mink Nutcharut**	Thailand	1	3
10	Ann-Marie Farren	England	1	2
10	Lisa Quick	England	1	2
12	Mandy Fisher	England	1	1
13	Lesley McIlrath	Australia	1	0
13	Sue Foster	England	1	0
13	**Baipat Siripaporn**	Thailand	1	0
13	**Panchaya Channoi**	Thailand	1	0
17	Maria Catalano	England	0	5
18	Emma Bonney	England	0	3
19	Lynette Horsburgh	Scotland	0	2
20	Muriel Hazeldene	England	0	1
20	Agnes Davies	Wales	0	1
20	Maureen Baynton	England	0	1
20	Natalie Stelmach	Canada	0	1
20	Maryann McConnell	Canada	0	1
20	Sue LeMaich	Canada	0	1
20	Kim Shaw	England	0	1
20	Lisa Ingall	England	0	1
20	Katie Henrick	England	0	1
20	June Banks	England	0	1
20	Vidya Pillai	India	0	1
20	**Wendy Jans**	Belgium	0	1

Active players are shown in bold.
