= Reanne Evans =

English snooker player (born 1985)

Reanne Evans MBE
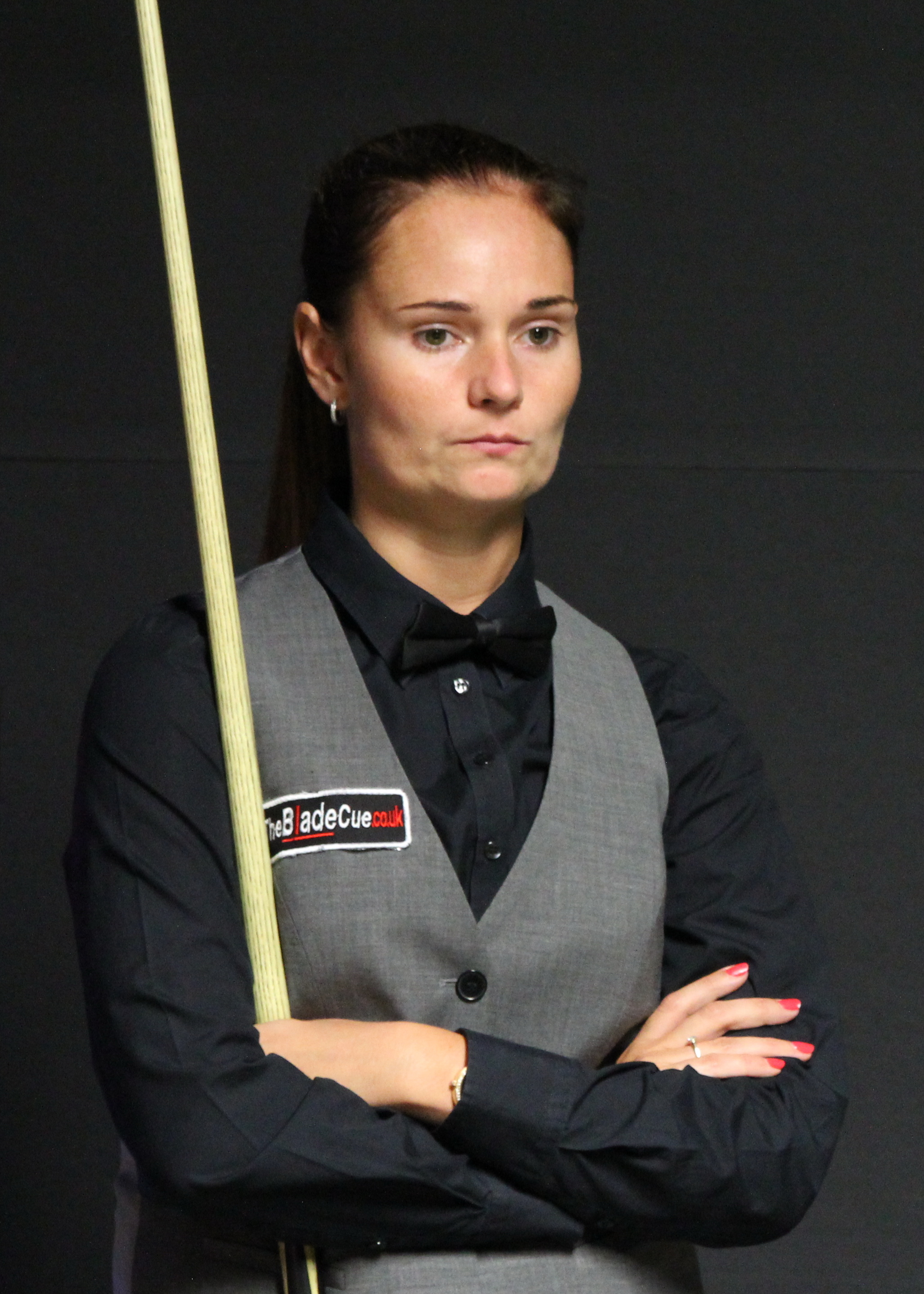
- Evans at the 2017 Paul Hunter Classic

Personal information
- Born: 25 October 1985 (age 41) Dudley, West Midlands, England

Sport
- Country: England
- Sport: Snooker
- Professional: 2010/2011, 2021–present
- Highest ranking: World Women's Snooker: 1
- Current ranking: 87 (as of 7 November 2026)

Reanne Evans MBE (born 25 October 1985) is an English professional snooker player and regular pundit on televised snooker broadcasts. Widely recognised as the most successful female player in the sport's history, she has won the World Women's Snooker Championship a record 12 times and is the reigning World Mixed Doubles champion (with Luca Brecel). She received an MBE in the 2020 Birthday Honours for her services to women's snooker.

Born in Dudley, West Midlands, Evans began playing snooker at age 13. She competed in her first World Women's Snooker Championship in 2002, aged 16, where she reached the semi-finals. She won the women's world title a record 10 consecutive times between 2005 and 2014 and added further women's world titles in 2016 and 2019. Her other records on the women's tour include 12 UK Women's Snooker Championships, 58 ranking titles, and 90 consecutive victories between 2008 and 2011. She has achieved the highest break on the women's tour, having made 140 twice.

Granted a wildcard to the professional World Snooker Tour for the 2010–11 season, she became the first woman to compete professionally since Allison Fisher 16 years previously but was relegated at the end of the season after 18 consecutive defeats. In 2013, she qualified for the Wuxi Classic as an amateur competitor, becoming the first woman to reach the final stages of a professional ranking snooker tournament. Granted wildcards to the World Snooker Championship qualifying rounds in 2015 and from 2017 to 2021, she reached the second qualifying round in 2017 by defeating Finnish player Robin Hull 10–8.

On International Women's Day in 2021, the World Snooker Tour announced that the two top-ranked players on the women's tour—then Evans and Ng On-yee—would receive two-year professional tour cards to begin in the 2021–22 season. Evans's only victory during her first two years on the professional tour came when she defeated Stuart Bingham in the last 128 of the 2023 Snooker Shoot Out, becoming the first woman to win a televised match at a ranking event. Despite being relegated from the professional tour at the end of the 2022–23 season, she ended the season as the women's world number one, which secured her a new two-year professional tour card for the 2023–24 and 2024–25 seasons. At the 2024 English Open, Evans faced Mink Nutcharut, the first time two women had played each other in a professional match. Following her defeat in the 2025 World Snooker Championship qualifiers, Evans lost her professional tour card, but she was subsequently awarded a new tour card for the following two seasons as one of the two eligible players from the women's tour.

== Early life and women's snooker ==
=== Early life ===
Born on 25 October 1985, in Dudley, West Midlands, Reanne Evans was educated at Bishop Milner Catholic School, Dudley. Her parents and two older brothers all played snooker, and she began playing herself at age 13.

=== World Ladies' Billiards and Snooker/World Women's Snooker ===
Evans competed in her first World Women's Snooker Championship in 2002, aged 16. She defeated third seed Lynette Horsburgh 4–3 in the quarter-finals but lost 0–4 to eventual champion Kelly Fisher in the semi-finals. She won her first ranking tournament, the Connie Gough Memorial Championship, in 2004. This was the only women's ranking event held in the 2003–04 season.

Evans won her first world championship in 2005 with a 6–4 victory over Horsburgh in the final, which featured one frame that was replayed because of a problem with the scoring. She retained the title in 2006, just six weeks before she was due to give birth, defeating Emma Bonney 5–3 in the final. She also won the 2006 WLBSA mixed doubles title, partnering with Mark Allen to defeat Sonia Chapman and Matthew Couch 3–0 in the final.

In the 2007 world final, Evans was level 3–3 with Kate Henrick before winning the next two frames to claim her third successive title. Evans made the highest break of the 2008 tournament, 102, and won 5–2 against June Banks in the final. Evans defeated Maria Catalano in four of the next five world championship finals, including a 5–2 win in 2009, and a 5–1 margin in 2010. A 5–1 victory against Emma Bonney in the 2011 final was Evans's 88th consecutive match win in women's snooker events. Catalano and Evans were level at 2–2 in the 2012 final before Evans went on to win 5–3. In the final against Catalano in 2013, Evans compiled two century breaks during the match, including a 117, the highest of the tournament, and won 6–3. She won her tenth consecutive title in 2014 with a 6–0 defeat of Ng On-yee in the final.

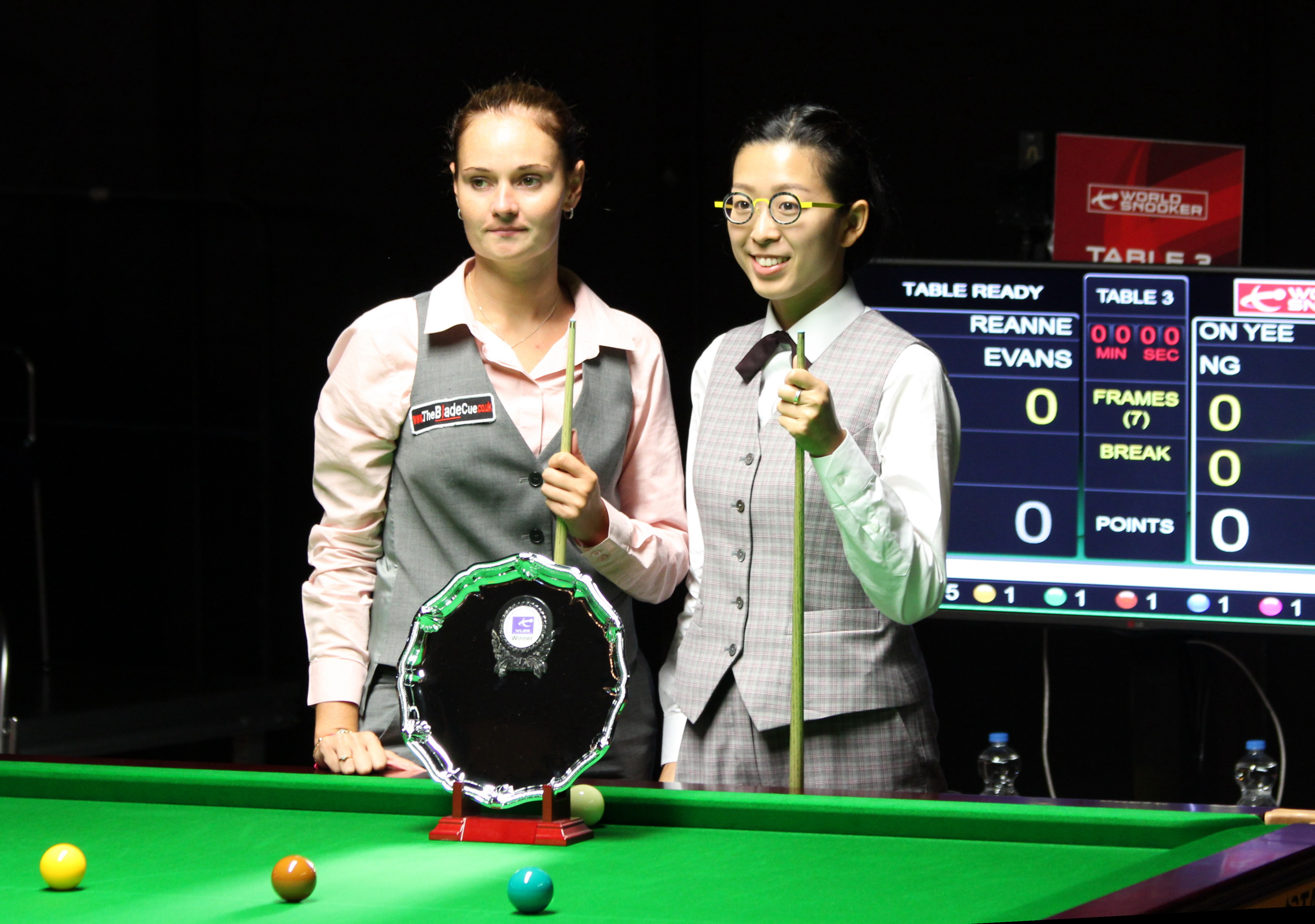
Evans and Ng On-yee before the final of the Paul Hunter Women's Classic 2017

In the semi-finals of the 2015 championship, Ng and Evans were level at 2–2, before Ng went on to win 4–2. The pair faced each other again in the 2016 final, when Evans won the first frame, before Ng took the next three. Ng led 4–3 before Evans won three frames in a row to take the match 6–4 for her eleventh world championship win. In 2017, Ng eliminated Evans 5–4 in the semi-finals. Evans lost again in the 2018 semi-finals, after Catalano defeated her 5–4. Evans won the 2019 Women's Tour Championship, held at the Crucible Theatre, defeating Mink Nutcharut in the semi-finals and Ng in the final. She claimed her twelfth world title in 2019, with a 6–3 win in the final against Mink.

She was awarded an MBE in the 2020 Birthday Honours for her services to women's snooker.

In September 2021, following an 18-month suspension of the Women's Snooker Tour due to the COVID-19 pandemic, Evans won the 2021 UK Women's Championship, defeating Rebecca Kenna 4–0 in the final. In November 2021, she was runner-up to Ng in the Eden Women's Masters, losing the final 3–4 after having led 3–1. In January 2022, she lost 3–4 to Mink in the final of the British Women's Open. At the 2022 World Championship, Evans was the defending champion, but she lost 1–4 to Belgian player Wendy Jans in the quarter-finals, the first time she had not reached at least the semi-finals of the tournament. She retained her number one place in the women's world rankings at the end of the 2021–22 season, although Ng and Mink closed the gap in ranking points. After the 2023 Asia-Pacific Women's Championship, Mink replaced Evans as world number one. Evans lost in the semi-finals of the 2023 World Championship to 19-year-old Chinese tour debutant Bai Yulu, who recovered from 1–3 behind to clinch a 5–3 victory. Bai again eliminated Evans 5–3 in the semi-finals of the 2024 event, taking five consecutive frames after Evans had established a 3–0 lead.

Widely recognised as the most successful female player in the sport's history, with her ten consecutive Women's Snooker Championship titles from 2005 to 2014, and further titles in 2016 and 2019 for a total of 12 women's world titles, Evans surpassed Allison Fisher's previous record of seven. Evans has also won a record 12 UK Women's Snooker Championships, and recorded the highest break on the women's tour (140 twice). Prior to her loss to Maria Catalano at the 2011 Northern Classic, she won a record 90 consecutive women's snooker matches.

=== Other international competitions ===
==== International Billiards and Snooker Federation ====
Evans won the IBSF Women's Snooker Championship in 2004, 2007, and 2008, with Wendy Jans the losing finalist on each occasion. She did not travel to the 2009 championship in Hyderabad to defend her title as the cost of travelling would have been more than the prize money she could have earned.

==== European Billiards and Snooker Association ====
Evans reached the final of the Women's EBSA European Snooker Championship in 2004, but lost 3–5 to Jans. In 2007 she won the title by defeating Jans 5–2 in the final, and retained it in 2008 with a 5–3 victory against Emma Bonney.

== World Snooker Tour ==
After winning 61 consecutive women's matches and defeating reigning world champion John Higgins 4–3 at the 2009 Six-red World Championship, Evans was awarded a wildcard on the professional tour for the 2010–11 season, enabling her to enter all ranking events at the qualifying stage. This made her the first woman to play on the main tour since Allison Fisher in 1994–95. Evans failed to win a match throughout her season on the tour, suffering 18 consecutive defeats. She entered Q-School, but was unable to qualify for the main tour in the 2011–12 season.

In the 2012–13 season, Evans won enough Q-School matches to earn a "top-up" place in the qualifying rounds for the 2013 Wuxi Classic, competing as an amateur. In her qualifying match, she defeated Thepchaiya Un-Nooh 5–4 to become the first woman to reach the final stages of a ranking snooker tournament. Originally scheduled to play world number two Neil Robertson in the last 64, she then became one of four players selected to play an extra wildcard round against local Chinese opponents. She lost 2–5 to Chinese teenager Zhu Yinghui in the wildcard round.

In March 2015, Evans was awarded a place in the qualifying rounds of the 2015 World Snooker Championship. She lost her opening match 8–10 to 1997 world champion Ken Doherty.

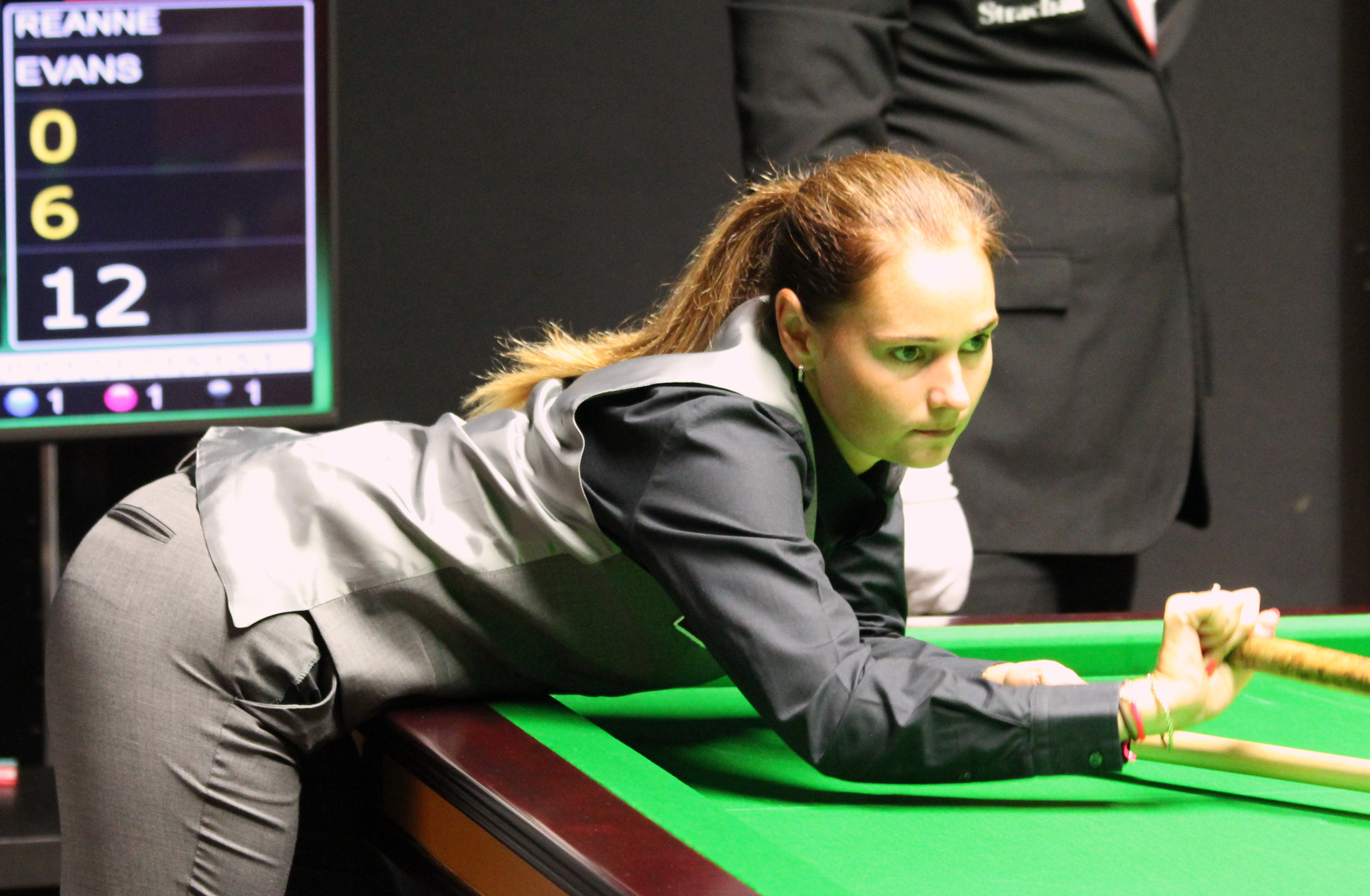
2017 Paul Hunter Classic

In the qualifying rounds for the 2017 World Snooker Championship, Evans defeated Robin Hull 10–8 in the first round, calling the victory the best of her career to that point. She lost 6–10 to Lee Walker in the second round of qualifying. In the next four world championships, she exited in the first qualifying round each year, losing 7–10 to Dominic Dale in 2018, 2–10 to Zhang Yong in 2019, and to Andy Hicks by 3–6 in 2020 and 2–6 in 2021.

At the 2019 Champion of Champions, Evans became the first female player to compete in the event. She lost 3–4 to Shaun Murphy in the first round, after coming back from 0–3 down to force a deciding frame.

On International Women's Day in 2021, World Snooker announced that Evans and Ng On-yee, the top-two players in the women's world rankings, would receive two-year invitational tour cards to commence in the 2021–22 snooker season. In the second ranking event of the season, the British Open, Evans was drawn in the first round against Mark Allen, her former partner and father of her daughter, with whom she had a strained relationship following a dispute over child support. Evans refused Allen's offer of a handshake before the match began. She took a 2–1 lead and led 60–22 in the fourth frame, but Allen came back to win 3–2. Evans did not win any matches during her season on the tour, which ended with a 2–6 defeat to Lee Walker in the first round of qualifying for the 2022 World Snooker Championship. Following her loss to Walker, Evans posted on social media that the "last year or so has been tough on and off [the] table" but that she was "working on it". She later revealed that she had experienced an intermittent lack of sensation in her arm while playing, and tremors on one side of her body, which affected her play. At the end of the 2021–22 season, Evans was entered into the Snooker Hall of Fame, along with Allison Fisher, for "outstanding contributions to the growth of snooker".

Evans's only victory during her two years on tour came at the 2023 Snooker Shoot Out (2022–23 season), when she defeated Stuart Bingham by 60 points to 8 in their one-frame encounter in the last-128 round, becoming the first woman to win a televised match at a ranking event.

After losing in the first qualifying round of the 2023 World Snooker Championship, Evans ended the season ranked 126th in the snooker world rankings and was relegated from the professional tour. However, she was runner-up in the 2023 British Women's Open the following month, which enabled her to end the season ranked number one in the World Women's Snooker rankings. This secured her a new two-year professional tour card to begin in the 2023–24 season.

In her qualifying group at the 2023 Championship League, Evans defeated Jimmy White 3–1 and drew 2–2 with Xu Si, but having lost 0–3 to Judd Trump, she missed out on progressing to the next stage. She defeated Jenson Kendrick 5–4 in the qualifying round of the 2023 European Masters, and then lost 1–5 to David Gilbert in the first round. She did not win any other matches on the main tour in the 2023–24 season, although two of her other matches in qualifying rounds went to a deciding frame, as she lost 5–6 to Ryan Thomerson at the 2023 UK Championship, and 4–5 to Tian Pengfei at the 2024 German Masters.

At the 2024 World Mixed Doubles, Evans and teammate Luca Brecel defeated Mark Selby and Rebecca Kenna 4–2 in the final, winning the event for the first time.

On 12 September 2024, Evans lost to Mink Nutcharut 4–2 in the first round at the English Open in the first match between two female players on the professional World Snooker Tour.

Following her 4–10 defeat to Antoni Kowalski in the 2025 World Snooker Championship qualifiers, Evans lost her professional tour card. However, she was awarded a new two-year tour card for the following two seasons as one of the two eligible female players following the 2025 World Women's Snooker Championship.

== Personal life ==
Evans was in a relationship with Northern Irish professional snooker player Mark Allen from 2005 to 2008. They share a daughter, Lauren Sophie Allen, who was born at Russells Hall Hospital, Dudley, in May 2006 when both players were 20 years old. The end of Evans and Allen's relationship was reported as acrimonious and led to legal disputes over child maintenance payments. In 2022, Allen stated that he no longer saw his then 16-year-old daughter Lauren, but said "I still think about her all the time".

Evans has been critical of the low prize money in women's snooker, stating that she earned £450 for winning one of her women's world titles. In 2015, at age 29, Evans, then a 10-time women's world champion, was still living in her parents' home with her daughter because she could not afford to move out.

== Performance and rankings timeline ==
=== World Snooker Tour ===
Tournament	2010/ 11	2011/ 12	2012/ 13	2013/ 14	2014/ 15	2015/ 16	2016/ 17	2017/ 18	2018/ 19	2019/ 20	2020/ 21	2021/ 22	2022/ 23	2023/ 24	2024/ 25	2025/ 26	2026/ 27
Ranking (Note: It shows the ranking at the beginning of the season)	(Note: New players on the Main Tour don't have a ranking)	(Note: She was an amateur)											93	(Note: Players qualified through Women's Tour started the season without ranking points)	92		82
Ranking tournaments
Championship League	Non-Ranking Event										A	RR	RR	RR	RR	RR	RR
China Open	LQ	A	A	A	A	A	A	A	A	Tournament Not Held							LQ
Wuhan Open	Tournament Not Held													LQ	LQ	2R	LQ
British Open	Tournament Not Held											1R	LQ	LQ	LQ	1R	LQ
English Open	Tournament Not held						A	A	A	A	A	LQ	LQ	LQ	LQ	LQ	LQ
Shenzhen Open (Note: The event was called the Xi'an Grand Prix (2024/2025–2025/2026))	Tournament Not Held														LQ	LQ	LQ
Northern Ireland Open	Tournament Not Held						A	A	A	A	A	LQ	LQ	LQ	LQ	LQ	LQ
International Championship	Not Held		A	A	A	A	A	A	A	A	Not Held			LQ	LQ	LQ	
UK Championship	LQ	A	A	A	A	A	A	A	A	A	A	1R	LQ	LQ	WD	LQ	
Shoot Out	Non-Ranking Event						A	A	1R	1R	1R	1R	2R	1R	1R	1R	
Scottish Open	Not Held		MR	Not Held			A	A	A	A	A	LQ	LQ	LQ	LQ	LQ	
German Masters	LQ	A	A	A	A	A	A	A	A	A	A	LQ	LQ	LQ	LQ	LQ	LQ
Welsh Open	LQ	A	A	A	A	A	A	A	A	A	A	LQ	LQ	LQ	LQ	WD	
World Grand Prix	Tournament Not Held				NR	DNQ	DNQ	DNQ	DNQ	DNQ	DNQ	DNQ	DNQ	DNQ	DNQ	DNQ	
Players Championship (Note: The event was called the Players Tour Championship Grand Final (2010/2011–2015/2016))	DNQ	DNQ	DNQ	DNQ	DNQ	DNQ	DNQ	DNQ	DNQ	DNQ	DNQ	DNQ	DNQ	DNQ	DNQ	DNQ	
World Open	LQ	A	A	A	Not Held		A	A	A	A	Not Held			LQ	LQ	LQ	
Tour Championship	Tournament Not Held								DNQ	DNQ	DNQ	DNQ	DNQ	DNQ	DNQ	DNQ	
World Championship	LQ	A	A	A	LQ	A	LQ	LQ	LQ	LQ	LQ	LQ	LQ	LQ	LQ	LQ	
Non-ranking tournaments
Champion of Champions	Not Held			A	A	A	A	A	A	1R	A	A	A	A	A	A	
Former ranking tournaments
Wuxi Classic	Non-Ranking		A	WR	A	Tournament Not Held											
Shanghai Masters	LQ	A	A	A	A	A	A	A	Non-Ranking		Not Held			Non-Ranking Event			
Paul Hunter Classic	Minor-Ranking Event						LQ	1R	A	NR	Tournament Not Held						
Turkish Masters	Tournament Not Held											LQ	Tournament Not Held				
Gibraltar Open	Tournament Not held					MR	A	A	A	A	A	1R	Tournament Not Held				
WST Classic	Tournament Not Held												1R	Tournament Not Held			
European Masters	Tournament Not Held						A	A	A	A	A	LQ	LQ	1R	Not Held		
Saudi Arabia Masters	Tournament Not Held														1R	3R	NH
Former non-ranking tournaments
Six-red World Championship	A	NH	A	A	A	A	A	A	A	RR	Not Held		LQ	Tournament Not Held			

Performance table legend
LQ	lost in the qualifying draw	#R	lost in the early rounds of the tournament (WR = Wildcard round, RR = Round robin)	QF	lost in the quarter-finals
SF	lost in the semi–finals	F	lost in the final	W	won the tournament
DNQ	did not qualify for the tournament	A	did not participate in the tournament	WD	withdrew from the tournament

NH / Not Held	means an event was not held.
NR / Non-Ranking event	means an event is/was no longer a ranking event.
R / Ranking event	means an event is/was a ranking event.
MR / Minor Ranking event	means an event is/was a minor-ranking event.

=== World Women's Snooker ===
World Women's Snooker tournament performances by Reanne Evans
Tournament	2001/ 02	2002/ 03	2003/ 04	2004/ 05	2005/ 06	2006/ 07	2007/ 08	2008/ 09	2009/ 10	2010/ 11	2011/ 12	2012/ 13	2013/ 14	2014/ 15	2015/ 16	2016/ 17	2017/ 18	2018/ 19	2019/ 20	2021/ 22	2022/ 23	2023/ 24	2024/ 25
Current tournaments
UK Championship	A	1R	NH	F	W	W	W	W	W	W	W	A	SF	A	F	W	F	1R	W	W	W	W	F
US Open	Tournament Not Held																				A	A	A
Australian Open	Tournament Not Held																	SF	A	NH	A	A	A
Scottish Open	A	1R	Tournament Not Held																		W	NH	NH
Masters	Tournament Not Held						W	W	W	W	Not Held		W	W	W	W	F	W	W	F	SF	WD	W
Belgian Open	Tournament Not Held																	W	F	NH	SF	SF	W
Asia-Pacific Championship	Tournament Not Held																				A	NH	NH
Albanian Women's Open	Tournament Not Held																					QF	NH
WSF Women's Championship	Tournament Not Held																						A
World Championship	SF	SF	NH	W	W	W	W	W	W	W	W	W	W	SF	W	SF	SF	W	NH	QF	SF	SF	2R
British Open	A	LQ	NH	W	F	W	A	A	W	W	Not Held		W	Not Held			W	Not Held		F	F	SF	
Former tournaments
Scottish Masters	NH	1R	Tournament Not Held																				
LG Cup	A	LQ	Tournament Not Held																				
Welsh Open	A	1R	Tournament Not Held																				
East Anglian Championship	Tournament Not Held				F	W	A	W	W	W	A	Tournament Not Held											
Northern Championship	Not Held		SF	A	Tournament Not Held					SF	A	Tournament Not Held											
Southern Championship (Note: The event was called the South Coast Classic (2006/2007–2009/2010))	Tournament Not Held					W	SF	W	W	W	A	NH	A	Tournament Not Held									
Eden Classic	Tournament Not Held													W	W	Tournament Not Held							
Connie Gough Trophy (Note: The event was called the Connie Gough National (2004/2005–2009/2010) and Connie Gough Memorial (2010/2011–2014/2015))	A	QF	W	A	F	SF	F	W	W	W	1R	A	W	W	W	SF	Tournament Not Held						
Paul Hunter Classic	Tournament Not Held															F	W	Tournament Not Held					
European Masters (Note: The event was called the European Open (2002/2003))	A	1R	Tournament Not Held															W	Tournament Not Held				
10-Red World Championship	Tournament Not Held																A	W	W	Not Held			
6-Red World Championship	Tournament Not Held																A	W	W	Not Held			
Tour Championship	Tournament Not Held																		W	Not Held			
Winchester Open	Tournament Not Held																			SF	Not held		

Performance Table Legend
LQ	lost in the qualifying draw	#R	lost in the early rounds of the tournament (WR = Wildcard round, RR = Round robin)	QF	lost in the quarter-finals
SF	lost in the semi-finals	F	lost in the final	W	won the tournament
DNQ	did not qualify for the tournament	A	did not participate in the tournament	WD	withdrew from the tournament

NH / Not Held	means an event was not held.
NR / Non-Ranking Event	means an event is/was no longer a ranking event.
R / Ranking Event	means an event is/was a ranking event.
MR / Minor-Ranking Event	means an event is/was a minor-ranking event.
PA / Pro-am Event	means an event is/was a pro-am event.

== Career finals ==
=== Women's finals: 92 (76 titles) ===
Legend
Women's World Championship (12–0)
Women's UK Championship (12–4)
Women's Masters (11–2)
Other (41–10)

Individual finals contested by Reanne Evans
Outcome	No.	Year	Championship	Opponent in the final	Score	Ref.
Winner	1.	2002	LG Cup (Plate)	Tara Hickling (ENG)	2–0	
Runner-up	1.	2002	British Open (Plate)	Caty Dehaene (BEL)	1–2	
Winner	2.	2003	Scottish Open (Plate)	Candide Binon (BEL)	2–0	
Winner	3.	2004	Connie Gough Memorial	Emma Bonney (ENG)	4–2	
Runner-up	2.	2004	EBSA Snooker Championship	Wendy Jans (BEL)	3–4	
Winner	4.	2004	Ladies' British Open	Katie Henrick (ENG)	4–0	
Runner-up	3.	2004	Women's UK Championship	Lynette Horsburgh (SCO)	3–4	
Winner	5.	2004	IBSF Snooker Championship	Wendy Jans (BEL)	5–1	
Winner	6.	2005	Women's World Championship	Lynette Horsburgh (SCO)	6–4	
Runner-up	4.	2005	Ladies' British Open	June Banks (ENG)	0–4	
Winner	7.	2005	Women's UK Championship	Maria Catalano (ENG)	4–0	
Runner-up	5.	2005	East Anglian Championship	June Banks (ENG)	3–4	
Runner-up	6.	2006	Connie Gough National	Maria Catalano (ENG)	3–4	
Winner	8.	2006	Women's World Championship (2)	Emma Bonney (ENG)	5–3	
Winner	9.	2006	Women's UK Championship (2)	June Banks (ENG)	4–2	
Winner	10.	2006	East Anglian Championship	June Banks (ENG)	4–3	
Winner	11.	2006	Ladies' British Open (2)	June Banks (ENG)	4–2	
Winner	12.	2007	South Coast Classic	Maria Catalano (ENG)	4–2	
Winner	13.	2007	Women's World Championship (3)	Katie Henrick (ENG)	5–3	
Winner	14.	2007	EBSA Snooker Championship	Wendy Jans (BEL)	5–2	
Winner	15.	2007	Wytech Masters	Emma Bonney (ENG)	4–2	
Winner	16.	2007	Women's UK Championship (3)	June Banks (ENG)	4–2	
Winner	17.	2007	IBSF Snooker Championship (2)	Wendy Jans (BEL)	5–0	
Runner-up	7.	2008	Connie Gough National (2)	Maria Catalano (ENG)	2–3	
Winner	18.	2008	Women's World Championship (4)	June Banks (ENG)	5–2	
Winner	19.	2008	EBSA Snooker Championship (2)	Emma Bonney (ENG)	5–3	
Winner	20.	2008	Wytech Masters (2)	Katie Henrick (ENG)	2–0	
Winner	21.	2008	Women's UK Championship (4)	Katie Henrick (ENG)	3–1	
Winner	22.	2008	East Anglian Championship (2)	Maria Catalano (ENG)	3–0	
Winner	23.	2008	IBSF Snooker Championship (3)	Wendy Jans (BEL)	5–3	
Winner	24.	2009	South Coast Classic (2)	Maria Catalano (ENG)	3–0	
Winner	25.	2009	Connie Gough National (2)	Katie Henrick (ENG)	3–1	
Winner	26.	2009	Women's World Championship (5)	Maria Catalano (ENG)	5–2	
Winner	27.	2009	Wytech Masters (3)	Maria Catalano (ENG)	3–0	
Winner	28.	2009	Ladies UK Championship (5)	Maria Catalano (ENG)	3–1	
Winner	29.	2009	East Anglian Championship (3)	Maria Catalano (ENG)	3–0	
Winner	30.	2009	Ladies British Open (3)	Katie Henrick (ENG)	3–1	
Winner	31.	2010	South Coast Classic (2)	Maria Catalano (ENG)	3–1	
Winner	32.	2010	Connie Gough National (3)	Maria Catalano (ENG)	3–1	
Winner	33.	2010	Women's World Championship (6)	Maria Catalano (ENG)	5–1	
Winner	34.	2010	Wytech Masters (4)	Maria Catalano (ENG)	3–1	
Winner	35.	2010	Women's UK Championship (6)	Maria Catalano (ENG)	3–0	
Winner	36.	2010	East Anglian Championship (4)	Emma Bonney (ENG)	3–0	
Winner	37.	2010	British Open (4)	Emma Bonney (ENG)	3–1	
Winner	38.	2011	Southern Classic (3)	Emma Bonney (ENG)	3–1	
Winner	39.	2011	Connie Gough Memorial (4)	Emma Bonney (ENG)	3–0	
Winner	40.	2011	Women's World Championship (7)	Emma Bonney (ENG)	5–1	
Winner	41.	2011	Women's UK Championship (7)	Emma Bonney (ENG)	3–2	
Winner	42.	2012	Connie Gough Memorial (Plate)	Tina Owen-Sevilton (ENG)	2–0	
Winner	43.	2012	Women's World Championship (8)	Maria Catalano (ENG)	5–3	
Winner	44.	2013	Women's World Championship (9)	Maria Catalano (ENG)	6–3	
Winner	45.	2013	Women's British Open (4)	Hannah Jones (WAL)	4–0	
Winner	46.	2013	Eden Resource Masters (5)	Maria Catalano (ENG)	4–0	
Winner	47.	2013	Connie Gough Memorial (5)	Maria Catalano (ENG)	4–0	
Winner	48.	2014	Women's World Championship (10)	Ng On-yee (HKG)	6–0	
Winner	49.	2014	Eden Classic	Maria Catalano (ENG)	5–3	
Winner	50.	2015	Eden Masters (6)	Ng On-yee (HKG)	5–1	
Winner	51.	2015	Connie Gough Memorial (6)	(England) Jasmine Bolsover	4–1	
Runner-up	8.	2015	Women's UK Championship (2)	Ng On-yee (HKG)	1–5	
Winner	52.	2015	Eden Ladies Masters (7)	Laura Evans (WAL)	5–0	
Winner	53.	2016	Connie Gough Trophy (7)	Maria Catalano (ENG)	4–0	
Winner	54.	2016	Eden Classic (2)	Ng On-yee (HKG)	5–1	
Winner	55.	2016	Women's World Championship (11)	Ng On-yee (HKG)	6–4	
Runner-up	9.	2016	Paul Hunter Ladies Classic	Ng On-yee (HKG)	1–4	
Winner	56.	2016	Women's UK Championship (8)	Tatjana Vasiljeva (LAT)	5–1	
Winner	57.	2017	Eden Women's Masters (8)	So Man Yan (HKG)	4–0	
Winner	58.	2017	Paul Hunter Ladies Classic	Ng On-yee (HKG)	4–1	
Runner-up	10.	2017	Women's UK Championship (3)	Ng On-yee (HKG)	1–4	
Runner-up	11.	2017	Eden Women's Masters	Ng On-yee (HKG)	3–4	
Winner	59.	2018	British Open	Nutcharut Wongharuthai (THA)	4–0	
Winner	60.	2018	Women's 10-Red Championship	Ng On-yee (HKG)	4–1	
Winner	61.	2018	Women's 6-Red Championship	Ng On-yee (HKG)	4–3	
Winner	62.	2018.	European Women's Masters	Nutcharut Wongharuthai (THA)	4–1	
Winner	63.	2018	Eden Women's Masters (9)	Rebecca Kenna (ENG)	4–0	
Winner	64.	2019	Belgian Women's Open	Ng On-yee (HKG)	4–1	
Winner	65.	2019	Women's 10-Red Championship (2)	Ng On-yee (HKG)	4–3	
Winner	66.	2019	Women's 6-Red Championship (2)	Nutcharut Wongharuthai (THA)	4–1	
Winner	67.	2019	Women's World Championship (12)	Nutcharut Wongharuthai (THA)	6–3	
Winner	68.	2019	Women's Tour Championship	Ng On-yee (HKG)	1–0	
Winner	69.	2019	Women's UK Championship (9)	Maria Catalano (ENG)	4–2	
Winner	70.	2019	Eden Masters (10)	Ng On-yee (HKG)	4–2	
Runner-up	12.	2020	Belgian Women's Open	Ng On-yee (HKG)	2–4	
Winner	71.	2021	Women's UK Championship (10)	Rebecca Kenna (ENG)	4–0	
Runner-up	13.	2021	Women's Masters (2)	Ng On-yee (HKG)	3–4	
Runner-up	14.	2022	Women's British Open	Nutcharut Wongharuthai (THA)	3–4	
Winner	72.	2022	UK Women's Championship (11)	Ng On-yee (HKG)	4–3	
Winner	73.	2022	Scottish Women's Open	Nutcharut Wongharuthai (THA)	4–2	
Runner-up	15.	2023	Women's British Open	Bai Yulu (CHN)	3–4	
Winner	74.	2023	UK Women's Championship (12)	Bai Yulu (CHN)	4–1	
Runner-up	16.	2024	UK Women's Championship (4)	Bai Yulu (CHN)	0–4	
Winner	75.	2024	Women's Masters (11)	Nutcharut Wongharuthai (THA)	4–3	
Winner	76.	2025	Belgian Women's Open (2)	Nutcharut Wongharuthai (THA)	4–3	

=== Team finals: 10 (9 titles) ===
Team finals contested by Reanne Evans
Outcome	No.	Year	Championship	Team/partner	Opponents in the final	Score	Ref.
Winner	1.	2004	EBSA European Team Ladies Championship	Katie Henrick (ENG)	Malgorzata Klys (POL); Maria Nielubowicz (POL)	7–1	
Winner	2.	2005	EBSA European Team Ladies Championship (2)	Katie Henrick (ENG)	Natascha Niermann (GER); Romana Leiterer (GER)	8–0	
Winner	3.	2006	WWS World Mixed Doubles Championship	Mark Allen (NIR)	Matthew Couch (ENG); Sonia Chapman (ENG)	3–0	
Winner	4.	2008	EBSA European Team Ladies Championship (3)	Emma Bonney (ENG)	Hanna Mergies (POL); Malgorzata Sikorska (POL)	6–0	
Winner	5.	2008	WWS World Mixed Doubles Championship (2)	Neil Robertson (AUS)	Joe Perry (ENG); Leah Willett (ENG)	3–1	
Winner	6.	2009	EBSA European Team Ladies Championship (4)	Maria Catalano (ENG)	Anna Mazhirina (RUS); Olga Zhuravleva (RUS)	6–0	
Winner	7.	2009	WWS World Mixed Doubles Championship (3)	Michael Holt (ENG)	Joe Perry (ENG); Leah Willett (ENG)	3–2	
Winner	8.	2015	WWS World Mixed Doubles Championship (4)	Michael Holt (ENG)	Hammad Miah (ENG); Maria Catalano (ENG)	4–1	
Runner-up	1.	2023	WWS Women's Snooker World Cup	Rebecca Kenna (ENG)	Amee Kamani (IND); Anupama Ramachandran (IND)	3–4	
Winner	9.	2024	World Mixed Doubles	(Belgium) Luca Brecel	(England) Mark Selby (England) Rebecca Kenna	4–2	
