= Hannah Jones (snooker player) =

Welsh snooker player

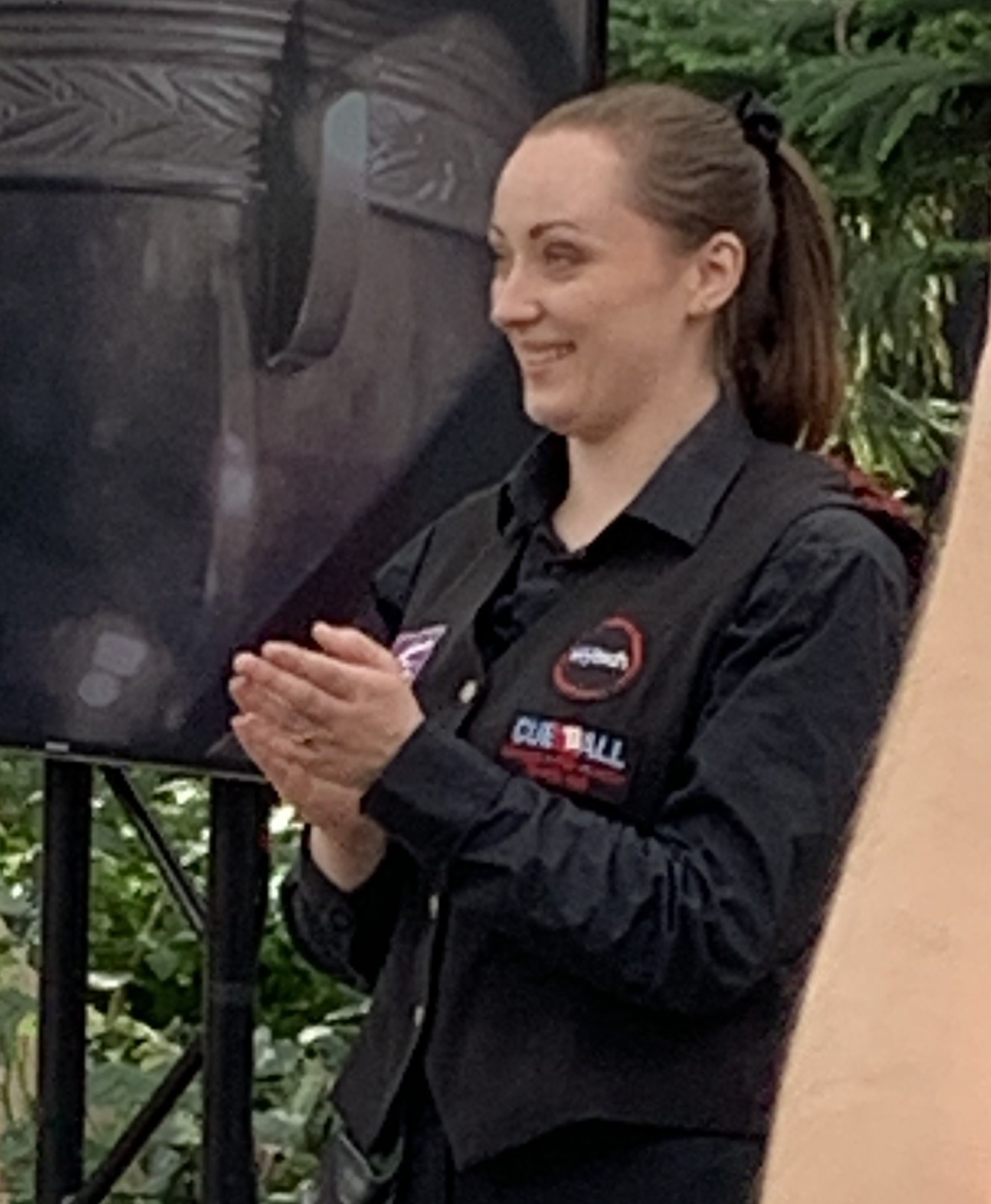
- Jones in 2025

Personal information
- Born: 2 September 1996 (age 30) Cardiff, Wales, United Kingdom

Sport
- Country: England
- Sport: Snooker
- Highest ranking: 5th (WLBSA)

Hannah Jones; born 2 September 1996) is a British snooker player who has won the English Ladies championship and the WLBSA World Ladies Junior Title 5 times, achieving a highest world ranking position of 5. Jones first played snooker at the Wellington Snooker Club, Cardiff in 2003.

Her total of twenty Under-21 titles is a World Women's Snooker record; it included victories World Women's Under-21 main championships from 2008 to 2011, in 2013, and in 2014. She was runner-up to Reanne Evans at the 2013 British Open.

After an eight year absence from World Women's Snooker competitions, Ward entered the 2023 UK Championship, progesssing from her qualifying group, and then defeating Chucky Preston 3–1 to reach the last 16.

== Achievements ==
Snooker competition results

- World Ladies Junior Champion – won 5 times – 2008 / 2009 / 2010 / 2011 / 2013
- World Ladies Doubles Champion (partnering Jaique Ip (HKG) – 2009
- World Ladies Connie Gough Under 21 Champion – 2014
- World Ladies Connie Gough Junior Champion – won 2 times – 2010 / 2011
- World Ladies East Anglian Junior Champion – won 3 times – 2008 / 2009 / 2010
- World Ladies East Anglian Under 40 Shield Champion – 2011
- World Ladies South Coast Classic Under 21 Champion – 2014
- World Ladies UK Junior Champion – won 3 times – 2009 / 2010 / 2012
- World Ladies Northern Under 40 Shield Champion – 2011
- World Ladies British Open Junior Champion – won 3 times – 2008 / 2009 / 2010
- World Ladies British Open Under 21 Champion – 2013
- Home Internationals Billiards and Snooker Federation Women's Team winner, with Ellise Scott (ENG) and Daisy May Oliver (ENG) against Mhairi Mackay] (SCO) and Tetyana Volovelska (SCO)

Billiards results

- EABA National Girls (under 19) Champion – won 4 times – 2010 / 2011 / 2012 / 2013

Awards

- Derbyshire Sports Awards – Junior Sportswoman of the Year – won two times – 2009 / 2010
- World Ladies Junior Player of the Year – 2011
