= Jaique Ip =

Snooker player from Hong Kong

Jaique Ip Wan-in
Personal information
- Born: 15 January 1980 (age 46)

Sport
- Country: Hong Kong
- Sport: Snooker
- Highest ranking: 3
Medal record
Women's Snooker
Representing Hong Kong
Asian Games
Gold medal – first place	2010 Guangzhou	Team
Asian Indoor Games
Bronze medal – third place	2007 Macau	Individual

Jaique Ip
- Traditional Chinese: 葉蘊妍
- Simplified Chinese: 叶蕴妍
Transcriptions
Standard Mandarin
- Hanyu Pinyin: Yè Yùnyán
Yue: Cantonese
- Jyutping: Jip^{6} Wan^{3} Jin^{4}
- IPA: [jip̚˨ wɐn˧.jin˩]

Jaique Ip Wan-in MH (Chinese: 葉蘊妍; born 15 January 1980) is a Hong Kong amateur snooker player.

== Biography ==
Ip won the silver medal at the 2006 IBSF World Championships in Amman, Jordan, after she lost 5–0 in the final against Wendy Jans. In 2007 she reached the semi-finals. Ip also represented Hong Kong in the 2007 Asian Indoor Games and won a bronze medal in the women's snooker event. In 2008, Ip became the WLBSA world doubles champions with Pam Wood, beating Chris Sharpe and Laura Alves in the final.

Jaique Ip won the Gold Medal as a member of the women's six reds team in the snooker competition at the 2010 Asian Games. Also in 2010, she was runner-up for the second time in the IBSF World Women's Snooker Championship, losing 0–5 to Ng On Yee.

On the Women's world snooker circuit, she has won several individual and doubles events, and reached her highest ranking of 3 in 2006.

She was awarded the Medal of Honour by the government of Hong Kong in 2011 for "her outstanding achievements in international snooker competitions."

== Career highlights ==
=== Individual ===
Outcome	No.	Year	Championship	Opponent	Score	Ref.
Runner-up	1	2006	IBSF World Snooker Championship	Wendy Jans	0–5	
Bronze (semi-final)	2	2007	2nd Asian Indoor Games	Park Eun-ji	3–0	(Note: Lost 1–3 to Santhinee Jaisuekul in the semi-final)
Winner	3	2012	WLBSA Agnes Davies Memorial Ranking Event	So Man Yan	3–0	
Runner-up	4	2012	UK Ladies Southern Classic (Ranking Event 4)	Emma Bonney	1–3	
Runner-up	5	2012	UK Ladies Connie Gough Memorial (Ranking Event 5)	Maria Catalano	0–3	

=== Team ===
Outcome	No.	Year	Championship	Opponents in the final	Score	Ref.
Winner	1	2008	Ladies World Doubles, with Pan Wood	Chris Sharpe and Laura Alves		
Winner	2	2009	Ladies World Doubles			
Gold	3	2010	Asian Games – Six-red snooker, with Ng On-yee and So Man Yan	China: Bi Zhu Qing, Chen Siming, Chen Xue	3–1	
Bronze (semi-final)	4	2013	4th Asian Indoor & Martial Arts Games – Women's Six Reds	Amornrat Uamduang	1–4	
Winner	5	2016	World Mixed Pairs Championship, with Ka Wai Cheung	Maria Catalano and Eden Sharav	4–3	

=== Hong Kong Championships ===
Snooker

Outcome	No.	Year	Championship	Ref.
Winner	1	2004	Hong Kong Women Snooker Open Championships	
Runner-up	2	2006	The 2nd Hong Kong Women Snooker Open Championships 2006	
Winner	3	2007	Hong Kong Women Snooker Open Championships	
Winner	4	2008	Hong Kong Women 6-Red Snooker Open Championships	
Winner	5	2009	Hong Kong Women 6-Red Snooker Open Championships	
Winner	6	2010	Hong Kong Women 6-Red Snooker Open Championships	
Winner	7	2011	Hong Kong Women 6-Red Snooker Open Championships	
Winner	8	2015	Hong Kong Women Snooker Open Championship	
Runner-up	9	2017	Hong Kong Women Snooker Open Championship	

Pocket Billiards (pool)

Outcome	No.	Year	Championship	Ref.
Winner	1	2008	Hong Kong Nine-ball Open Championships – Event 1 (Women)	
Winner	2	2008	Hong Kong Nine-ball Open Championships – Event 2 (Women)	
Winner	3	2008	Hong Kong Nine-ball Open Championships – Event 3 (Women)	
