= June Banks =

English snooker player

Personal information
- Born: 4 March 1969 (age 57)

Sport
- Country: England
- Sport: Snooker

June Banks (born 4 March 1969) is an English snooker player. She was runner-up in the 2008 World Women's Snooker Championship,

== Biography ==
Banks played in the 1987 World Women's Snooker Championship, reaching the quarter final, where she was beaten by Mandy Fisher.

From 1995 to 2002, Banks was beaten in five tournament finals by Kelly Fisher. Banks' first notable tournament victory came in 2005, when she beat Reanne Evans to become British Ladies Snooker Champion. Since then she has reached several other finals, and won the World Ladies Senior championship (for players aged 40 and over) for three consecutive years, 2009–2011.

She was runner-up in the 2008 World Women's Snooker Championship, losing 2–5 to the dominant player of the era, defending champion Reanne Evans. Evans won the title each year from 2005 to 2014, and also in 2016 and 2019.

Banks practices at the Sidcup Snooker Club.

== Titles and achievements ==
| Outcome | No. | Year | Championship | Opponent | Score | Ref. |
|---|---|---|---|---|---|---|
| Runner-up | 1 | 1995 | M-Tech Ladies Classic | Kelly Fisher | 0–4 | |
| Runner-up | 2 | 1996 | Bailey Homes | Kelly Fisher | 2–4 | |
| Runner-up | 3 | 1999 | Ladies British Open | Kelly Fisher | 2–4 | |
| Runner-up | 4 | 2000 | Ladies British Open | Kelly Fisher | 0–3 | |
| Runner-up | 5 | 2002 | Connie Gough National | Kelly Fisher | 2–4 | |
| Winner | 6 | 2005 | Ladies' British Open Championship | Reanne Evans | 4–0 | |
| Winner | 7 | 2005 | East Anglian Ladies' Championship | Reanne Evans | 4–3 | |
| Runner-up | 8 | 2006 | Regal Ladies Championship | Maria Catalano | 1–4 | |
| Runner-up | 9 | 2007 | Ladies UK Championship | Reanne Evans | 2–4 | |
| Runner-up | 10 | 2007 | East Anglian Championship | Reanne Evans | 2–4 | |
| Runner-up | 11 | 2007 | British Championship | Maria Catalano | | |
| Runner-up | 12 | 2007 | Connie Gough National | Maria Catalano | | |
| Runner-up | 13 | 2008 | East Anglian Championship | Katie Henrick | 1–3 | |
| Runner-up | 14 | 2008 | South Coast Classic | Emma Bonney | 2–3 | |
| Runner-up | 15 | 2008 | World Ladies Snooker Championship | Reanne Evans | 2–5 | |
| Runner-up | 14 | 2009 | British Championship | Emma Bonney | 0–3 | |
| Winner | 15 | 2009 | World Ladies Senior Championship | Jenny Poulter | 3–0 | |
| Winner | 16 | 2010 | World Ladies Senior Championship | Eva Palmius | 3–1 | |
| Winner | 17 | 2011 | World Ladies Senior Championship | | | |
