= Chitra Magimairaj =

Indian snooker, billiards, and pool player

Personal information
- Born: 7 April 1973 (age 53) India

Sport
- Country: India
- Sport: Snooker

Medal record

Women's snooker

Representing India

World Women's Senior Snooker Championship
Gold medal – first place	Individual competition	2014
Gold medal – first place	Individual competition	2016

Chitra Magimairaj (born 7 April 1973, Bangalore), is an Indian professional player of snooker, English billiards, and pool. She is a two-time World Ladies Billiards and Snooker Association World Champion of English Billiards (2006, 2007), a two-time national pool champion, and more recently the World Women's Senior Snooker Championship (2014 and 2016).

Her highest breaks are 91 at snooker and 49 at English billiards.

== Career ==
Magimairaj played cricket and hockey at state level until experiencing an injury that forced her to give up.

On 22 April 2014, Magimairaj won the World Women's Senior Snooker Championship, after defeating Alena Asmolava of Belarus, in Leeds, UK.

In 2007 she received a Kempegowda Award and an Ekalavya Award.

== Titles and achievements ==
English billiards

Outcome	No.	Year	Championship	Opponent	Score	Ref.
Winner	1	2006	World Ladies Billiards Championship	Emma Bonney	193–164	
Winner	2	2007	World Ladies Billiards Championship	Emma Bonney	187–148	
Runner-up	3	2009	World Ladies Billiards Championship	Emma Bonney	118–272	
Runner-up	4	2010	World Ladies Billiards Championship	Emma Bonney	220–269	
Runner-up	5	2013	Indian National Billiards Championship			

Snooker

Outcome	No.	Year	Championship	Opponent	Score	Ref.
Winner	1	2008	Australian Open Snooker Championship			
Runner-up	2	2009	Australian Open Snooker Championship			
Winner	3	2011	Indian National Six-red Snooker Championship			
Winner	4	2012	Indian National Snooker Championship			
Runner-up	5	2013	Indian National Snooker Championship			

Pool

Outcome	No.	Year	Championship	Opponent	Score	Ref.
Winner	1	2006	Indian National Eight-ball Pool Championship			
Winner	2	2007	Indian National Nine-ball Pool Championship			
Winner	3	2017	Indian National Nine-ball Pool Championship			
Winner	4	2026	Indian National Nine-ball Pool Championship	Ishika Shah	7-4	
