= Katie Henrick =

English snooker player

Personal information
- Born: 21 July 1980 (age 46)

Sport
- Country: England
- Sport: Snooker
- Highest ranking: 4

Katie Henrick (born 21 July 1980), also known by her married name of Katie Martyn, is an English snooker and pool player. She was runner-up in the 2007 World Ladies Snooker Championship.

== Biography ==
Henrick was a student at the Hundred of Hoo school and played pool before turning to snooker at the age of 14, taught by a family friend. She joined the women's snooker circuit at the age of 16.

She was the recipient of the World Ladies Billiards and Snooker Association Most Improved Player award in both 1998 and 1999. In 2000 she joined the Young Players' Distinction programme, which aimed to help young players develop their game as well as providing media training and advice on how to manage stress. In 2002, she achieved the highest break, 121, in the World Ladies Snooker Championship.

Henrick was runner-up to Wendy Jans at the 2005 European Championship.

She won her only ranking title, the 2007 Ladies East Anglian Open Championship, in 2007. 2007 was also the year of her appearance in the World Ladies Snooker Championship final, where she was beaten 3–5 by Reanne Evans.

From 2009, Henrick took up playing pool again, and in 2019 was ranked fourth by the World Eightball Pool Federation.

Henrick once doubled for Holly Willoughby on a children's television show, playing a trick shot whilst dressed in a French maid's outfit. She has worked as the Royal Automobile Club's snooker professional since 2003, coaching members.

== Titles and achievements ==
Snooker

| Outcome | No. | Year | Championship | Opponent | Score | Ref. |
|---|---|---|---|---|---|---|
| Runner-up | 1 | 1996 | Academy Fork Lift Classic (Under-21) | Lisa Ingall | 0–2 | |
| Runner-up | 2 | 1996 | Bailey Homes Ladies Classic (Under-21) - Results | Lisa Ingall | 0–2 | |
| Runner-up | 3 | 1996 | Regal Scottish Masters (Plate) | Julie Kelly | 0–3 | |
| Runner-up | 4 | 1997 | Regal Scottish Masters (Plate) | Julie Billings | 1–3 | |
| Winner | 5 | 1998 | Gravesend Under-21 Championship | | | |
| Winner | 6 | 1998 | Connie Gough Memorial (Plate) | Michelle Brown | 1–2 | |
| Runner-up | 7 | 2000 | UK Championship | Kelly Fisher | 0–4 | |
| Runner-up | 8 | 2004 | British Open | Reanne Evans | 0–4 | |
| Runner-up | 9 | 2005 | European Championship | Wendy Jans | 3–5 | |
| Runner-up | 10 | 2007 | World Women's Snooker Championship | Reanne Evans | 3–5 | |
| Runner-up | 11 | 2007 | Wytech Masters | Reanne Evans | 2–3 | |
| Winner | 12 | 2007 | East Anglian Championship | June Banks | 3–1 | |
| Runner-up | 13 | 2008 | Wytech Masters | Reanne Evans | 2–3 | |
| Runner-up | 14 | 2009 | Connie Gough National | Reanne Evans | 1–3 | |
| Runner-up | 15 | 2009 | British Open | Reanne Evans | 1–3 | |
| Runner-up | 16 | 2011 | East Anglian Championship | Maria Catalano | 0–3 | |
