= Emma Bonney =

Player of English billiards, 13-time world champion

- Born: 13 July 1976 (age 49); Portsmouth, Hampshire, England
- Sport country: England
- Highest ranking: 1 (Women's Snooker)

Tournament wins
- Ranking wins: 3 (Women's Snooker)
- World Women's Billiards Champion: 2000, 2002, 2008, 2009, 2010, 2011, 2013, April 2014, October 2014, 2015, 2016, 2017, 2018

Emma Bonney (born 13 July 1976) is an English billiards and snooker player. She has won the World Women's Billiards Championship title a record thirteen times.

Emma Bonney is the only player to be ranked number 1 in the world at both snooker and billiards at the same time.

== Biography ==
Bonney was born on 13 July 1976 in Portsmouth.

=== English billiards ===
Bonney has won the World Women's Billiards Championship title a record thirteen times. Bonney won the first of her world billiards championship titles in 2000, having been runner-up in 1998.

On 8 April 2010, she won her fifth World Ladies Billiards title at the Hall Green Stadium, Birmingham, beating Chitra Magimairaj of India 269–220 in the final.

Bonney won her 13th world billiards championship, and sixth consecutive victory, in 2018. The 2019 World Women's Billiards Championship was held in Australia, and Bonney did not participate.

=== Snooker ===
Bonney has been the runner-up in the World Women's Snooker Championship three times. She lost the final of the 2006 championship to Reanne Evans 3–5. In 2011 she again to Evans, 1–5. In 2015 Bonney lost 2–6 to Ng On Yee.

Bonney won two women's ranking tournaments in 2008, the South Coast Classic and the British Open. She won her third ranking tournament in 2012, the Southern Women's Classic championship, using a cue that she had recently bought and had only used for five hours of practice before the competition.

She was runner-up to Evans in the 2008 European Snooker Championships.

Her highest ranking in women's snooker was 1st.

== Career finals ==
Billiards

| Outcome | No. | Year | Championship | Opponent | Score | Ref. |
|---|---|---|---|---|---|---|
| Runner-up | 1 | 1998 | World Women's Billiards Championship | Karen Corr | 219–403 | |
| Winner | 2 | 2000 | World Women's Billiards Championship | Caroline Walch | 218–50 | |
| Runner-up | 3 | 2001 | World Women's Billiards Championship | Kelly Fisher | 219–290 | |
| Winner | 4 | 2002 | World Women's Billiards Championship | Kelly Fisher | 227–196 | |
| Runner-up | 5 | 2003 | World Women's Billiards Championship | Kelly Fisher | 155–299 | |
| Runner-up | 6 | 2006 | World Women's Billiards Championship | Chitra Magimairaj | 164–193 | |
| Runner-up | 7 | 2007 | World Women's Billiards Championship | Chitra Magimairaj | 148–187 | |
| Winner | 8 | 2008 | World Women's Billiards Championship | Eva Palmius | 216–119 | |
| Winner | 9 | 2009 | World Women's Billiards Championship | Chitra Magimairaj | 272–118 | |
| Winner | 10 | 2010 | World Women's Billiards Championship | Chitra Magimairaj | 269–220 | |
| Winner | 11 | 2011 | World Women's Billiards Championship | Tina Owen-Sevilton | 202–181 | |
| Runner-up | 12 | 2012 | World Women's Billiards Championship | Revanna Umadevi | 143–201 | |
| Winner | 13 | 2013 | World Women's Billiards Championship | Eva Palmius | 329–207 | |
| Winner | 14 | Apr 2014 | World Women's Billiards Championship | Revanna Umadevi | 226–209 | |
| Winner | 15 | Oct 2014 | World Women's Billiards Championship | Revanna Umadevi | 237–191 | |
| Winner | 16 | 2015 | World Women's Billiards Championship | Rochy Woods | 334–119 | |
| Winner | 17 | 2016 | World Women's Billiards Championship | Revanna Umadevi | 239–169 | |
| Winner | 18 | 2017 | World Women's Billiards Championship | Eva Palmius | 295–185 | |
| Winner | 19 | 2018 | World Women's Billiards Championship | Rebecca Kenna | 329–209 | |

Snooker

| Outcome | No. | Year | Championship | Opponent | Score | Ref. |
|---|---|---|---|---|---|---|
| Runner-up | 1 | 2004 | Connie Gough Memorial Championship | Reanne Evans | 2–4 | |
| Runner-up | 2 | 2006 | World Women's Snooker Championship | Reanne Evans | 3–5 | |
| Winner | 3 | 2008 | South Coast Classic | | | |
| Winner | 4 | 2008 | British Open | June Banks | 3–0 | |
| Runner-up | 5 | 2008 | European Snooker Championship | Reanne Evans | 3–5 | |
| Runner-up | 6 | 2011 | World Women's Snooker Championship | Reanne Evans | 1–5 | |
| Winner | 7 | 2012 | Southern Women's Classic champion | Jaique Ip | | |
| Runner-up | 8 | 2015 | World Women's Snooker Championship | Ng On-yee | 2–6 | |
