= World Women's Snooker =

Governing body for billiards and snooker

- Sport: Snooker and English billiards
- Jurisdiction: International
- Abbreviation: WWS
- Founded: 1981
- Affiliation: World Professional Billiards and Snooker Association
- Affiliation date: 2015
- Headquarters: Bristol, United Kingdom
- President: Mandy Fisher
- Chairman: Nigel Mawer
- Replaced: Women's Billiards & Snooker Association

Official website
- www.womenssnooker.com

World Women's Snooker, founded as the World Ladies Billiards and Snooker Association (WLBSA) in 1981 and known as World Ladies Billiards and Snooker (WLBS) from 2015 to 2018, is a subsidiary of the World Professional Billiards and Snooker Association (WPBSA) concerned with governing and promoting snooker and billiards for women.

== History ==
Women's Snooker and Billiards had been governed by the Women's Billiards Association (WBA), formed in 1931. However, the last professional billiards and snooker championships organised by the WBA were those held in 1950, and by the early 1970s the organisation had "fallen on hard times" according to leading snooker journalist and author Clive Everton.

A Women's Billiards & Snooker Association (WBSA) was formed in 1976, and in 1978 appointed Wally West, snooker club owner, and holder of the world record break of 151, as Secretary. The Association organised the 1976 Women's World Open snooker championship and further championships in 1980 and 1981.

=== 1981–2015: World Ladies Billiards and Snooker Association ===
Mandy Fisher, a leading woman player, founded the World Ladies Billiards and Snooker Association (WLBSA) in 1981. The WLBSA held its first open snooker competition in Leeds in March 1982, and within a couple of years, the WBSA lost control of snooker to the WLBSA.

In 1997, the World Professional Billiards and Snooker Association (WPBSA) started providing support and prize money for WLBSA tournaments, but the WPBSA's support for the women's circuit stopped in 2002 following the loss of income due to the UK government's restrictions on tobacco sponsorship of sport.

=== 2015–present ===
The WLBSA was restructured as a subsidiary of the World Professional Billiards and Snooker Association in 2015, and became a full member of the World Snooker Federation in 2017. It was known as World Ladies Billiards and Snooker from July 2015 to November 2018. In November 2018 the WLBSA was renamed as World Women's Snooker, and is responsible for women's snooker and billiards and the women's ranking list.

== See also ==
- World Women's Snooker rankings
- Women's Billiards Association
- World Billiards
- World Snooker Tour
- World Women's Billiards Championship
