= 2025 UK Women's Snooker Championship =

Women's snooker tournament

Tournament information
- Dates: 29–31 August 2025
- Venue: Northern Snooker Centre
- City: Leeds
- Country: England
- Organisation: World Women's Snooker
- Highest break: Bai Yulu (CHN) and Mink Nutcharut (THA) (102)

Final
- Champion: Bai Yulu (CHN)
- Runner-up: Ng On-yee (HKG)
- Score: 4‍–‍2

The 2025 UK Women's Snooker Championship (officially the 2025 Taom UK Women's Snooker Championship) was a women's snooker tournament that took place from 29 to 31 August 2025 at the Northern Snooker Centre in Leeds, England. It was organised by World Women's Snooker.

Bai Yulu was the defending champion, having defeated Reanne Evans 4‍–‍0 in the 2024 final. Bai won 4‍–‍2 over Ng On-yee to retain the title. She produced a 102 century break in the final, the highest of the tournament, tied with another made by Mink Nutcharut.

== Format ==
The players were drawn in eight groups, each containing four players. Those matches were played as the best of 3 frames. The top two players from each group qualified for the knockout stage. The first knockout round and the quarter-finals were played as the best of 5 frames. The semi-finals and the final were played as the best of 7 frames.

== Knockout ==
The draw for the tournament's knockout rounds is shown below. The match winners are shown in bold.

**Last 16**; Best of 5 frames
**Mink Nutcharut (THA)**	**3**
Audrey Chua (SGP)	0
Laura Killington (ENG)	0
**Anna Prisjažņuka (LAT)**	**3**
**Baipat Siripaporn (THA)**	**3**
Zeinab Shahi (IRN)	0
Reanne Evans (ENG)	2
**Ng On-yee (HKG)**	**3**
**Rebecca Kenna (ENG)**	**3**
So Man Yan (HKG)	2
Anupama Ramachandran (IND)	2
**Narucha Phoemphul (THA)**	**3**
**Tessa Davidson (ENG)**	**3**
Phakwalan Kongkaew (THA)	2
Deborah Fladgate (SCO)	0
**Bai Yulu (CHN)**	**3**

**Quarter-finals**; Best of 5 frames
**(Thailand) Mink Nutcharut**	**3**
(Latvia) Anna Prisjažņuka	1
(Thailand) Baipat Siripaporn	1
**(Hong Kong) Ng On-yee**	**3**
**(England) Rebecca Kenna**	**3**
(Thailand) Narucha Phoemphul	2
(England) Tessa Davidson	1
**(China) Bai Yulu**	**3**

**Semi-finals**; Best of 7 frames
(Thailand) Mink Nutcharut	2
**(Hong Kong) Ng On-yee**	**4**
(England) Rebecca Kenna	2
**(China) Bai Yulu**	**4**

**Final**; Best of 7 frames
(Hong Kong) Ng On-yee	2
**(China) Bai Yulu**	**4**

== Century breaks ==
Two century breaks were made during the event:

- 102 – Bai Yulu
- 102 – Mink Nutcharut
