= 2019 IBSF World Snooker Championship – Women's =

IBSF World Snooker Championship
Tournament information
- Dates: 29 October – 9 November 2019
- Venue: Starlight Resort Hotel
- City: Antalya
- Country: Turkey
- Organisation: IBSF
- Format: Qualifying groups round-robin, followed by knockout.
- Highest break: 91 (Bai Yulu)

Final
- Champion: Ng On-yee
- Runner-up: Nutcharut Wongharuthai
- Score: 5–2

The 2019 IBSF World Snooker Championship was an amateur snooker tournament that took place in 2019 in Antalya.

The women's tournament was won by Ng On-yee, who defeated Nutcharut Wongharuthai 5–2 in the final.

== Tournament Details ==
The 2019 IBSF World Snooker Championship was an amateur snooker tournament that was held from 29 October to 9 November 2019 at the Starlight Resort Hotel in Antalya. Qualifying group matches happened from 29 October to 5 November. The top three players from each group qualified for the knockout stage, which started with two first round matches on 6 November. The last 16 matches were held on 7 November, the quarter-finals and semi-finals on 8 November, and the final on 9 November.

Ng On-yee won her third IBSF world snooker title, nine years after her second. In the final, she beat Nutcharut Wongharuthai 5–2, after trailing 0–2. Ng dedicated her title win to Poon Ching-chiu, a snooker player who had died at the age of 18 in the fortnight before the final. Ng finished top of the qualifying round, winning all four of her matches 2–0. She then beat Joy Lyn Willenberg 3–0 in the last 16 and Amee Kamani 4–1 in the quarter-final. In the semi-final she was taken to the deciding frame by defending champion Waratthanun Sukritthanes, but with breaks of 34 and 40, won the last frame 85–0 and the match 4–3.

The three highest breaks of the tournament were 91, 81 and 78, all by reigning IBSF Under-21 snooker champion Bai Yulu.

== Results ==
=== Group Round ===
Source: ibsf.info

The top three players from each group qualified for the knockout stages.

Qualified for knockout

==== Group A ====
Place	Player	Matches	Matches won	Frames won	Frames lost	Difference
1	(Thailand) Waratthanun Sukritthanes	4	4	8	1	7
2	(India) Arantxa Sanchis	4	3	7	3	4
3	(Hong Kong) Jaique Ip	4	2	5	4	1
4	(South Africa) Linda De Paiva	4	1	2	6	−4
5	(Netherlands) Debbie Anthonissen	4	0	0	8	−8

==== Group B ====
Place	Player	Matches	Matches won	Frames won	Frames lost	Difference
1	(China) Bai Yulu	4	4	8	0	8
2	(India) Amee Kamani	4	3	6	2	4
3	(Iran) Sara Baharvandi	4	2	4	5	−1
4	(Netherlands) Janice Van Gastel	4	1	2	7	−5
5	(South Africa) Madeleine Jeanne Young	4	0	2	8	−6

==== Group C ====
Place	Player	Matches	Matches won	Frames won	Frames lost	Difference
1	(Thailand) Nutcharut Wongharuthai	4	4	8	2	6
2	(Russia) Anastasia Nechaeva	4	3	7	2	5
3	(India) Vidya Pillai	4	2	5	5	0
4	(Japan) Yuka Kamite	4	1	2	7	−5
5	(Australia) Judy Dangerfield	4	0	2	8	−6

==== Group D ====
Place	Player	Matches	Matches won	Frames won	Frames lost	Difference
1	(Belgium) Wendy Jans	3	3	6	0	6
2	(Hong Kong) Pui Ying Chu	3	2	4	3	1
3	(South Africa) Joy Lyn Willenberg	3	1	2	4	−2
4	(Iran) Armaghan Hassani	3	0	1	6	−5

==== Group E ====
Place	Player	Matches	Matches won	Frames won	Frames lost	Difference
1	(Hong Kong) Ng On-yee	4	4	8	0	8
2	(Australia) Jessica Woods	4	3	6	2	4
3	(Iran) Maryam Ebrahimi Basabi	4	2	4	4	0
4	(Turkey) Irem Öç Parlar	4	1	2	7	−5
5	(South Africa) Susanna Booyens	4	0	1	8	−7

==== Group F ====
Place	Player	Matches	Matches won	Frames won	Frames lost	Difference
1	(Hong Kong) So Man Yan	4	4	8	2	6
2	(Thailand) Ploychompoo Laokiatphong	4	3	7	3	4
3	(Germany) Diana Stateczny	4	2	6	4	2
4	(Australia) Kylie Bellinger	4	1	2	6	−4
5	(Iran) Pari Baharvandi	4	0	0	8	−8

=== Knockout rounds ===
Source: ibsf.info

Seedings are shown in the box to the left of the player's name. Match winners are in bold.

Round 1 Best of 5 frames
17	(Australia) Sara Baharvandi	2
16	(South Africa) **Joy Lyn Willenberg**	**3**
15	(Germany) **Diana Stateczny**	**3**
18	(Iran) Maryam Ebrahimi Basabi	0

Round 2 Best of 5 frames
1	(Hong Kong) **Ng On-yee**	**3**
16	(South Africa) Joy Lyn Willenberg	0
9	(India) **Amee Kamani**	**3**
8	(Russia) Anastasia Nechaeva	1
5	(Hong Kong) So Man Yan	1
12	(Hong Kong) **Pui Ying Chu**	**3**
13	(India) Vidya Pillai	0
4	(Thailand) **Waratthanun Sukritthanes**	**3**
3	(Belgium) **Wendy Jans**	**3**
14	(Hong Kong) Jaique Ip	1
11	(Thailand) Ploychompoo Laokiatphong	0
6	(Thailand) **Nutcharut Wongharuthai**	**3**
7	(India) **Arantxa Sanchis**	**3**
10	(Australia) Jessica Woods	2
18	(Germany) Diana Stateczny	0
2	(China) **Bai Yulu**	**3**

Quarter-finals; Best of 7 frames
1	(Hong Kong) **Ng On-yee**	**4**
9	(India) Amee Kamani	1
12	(Hong Kong) Pui Ying Chu	0
4	(Thailand) **Waratthanun Sukritthanes**	**4**
3	(Belgium) Wendy Jans	2
6	(Thailand) **Nutcharut Wongharuthai**	**4**
7	(India) **Arantxa Sanchis**	**4**
2	(China) Bai Yulu	3

Semi-finals; Best of 7 frames
1	(Hong Kong) **Ng On-yee**	**4**
4	(Thailand) Waratthanun Sukritthanes	3
6	(Thailand) **Nutcharut Wongharuthai**	**4**
7	(India) Arantxa Sanchis	2

Final; Best of 9 frames
1	(Hong Kong) **Ng On-yee**	**5**
6	(Thailand) Nutcharut Wongharuthai	2

=== Final ===
Source: Online scoresheet for the match.

Final: Best-of-9 frames. Referee: Yasemin Bağiran (Turkey) Antalya. 9 November 2019.
**Ng On-yee** (Hong Kong)		**5**–2		Nutcharut Wongharuthai (Thailand)			
Frame	1	2	3	4	5	6	7
Ng On-yee; 30+ Breaks	50 -	6 -	**67** (34)	**66** -	**86** (30,30)	**88** (68)	**69** (60)
Nutcharut Wongharuthai; 30+ Breaks	**55** -	**66** (34)	18 -	58 -	18 -	33 -	18 -
Frames won (Ng first)	0–1	0–2	1–2	2–2	3–2	4–2	5–2
68		Highest break		34			
2		50+ breaks					
3		30+ breaks		1			
**Ng On-yee wins the 2019 IBSF World Snooker Championship**
