= Ng On-yee =

Hong Kong snooker player (born 1990)

Ng On-yee BBS MH
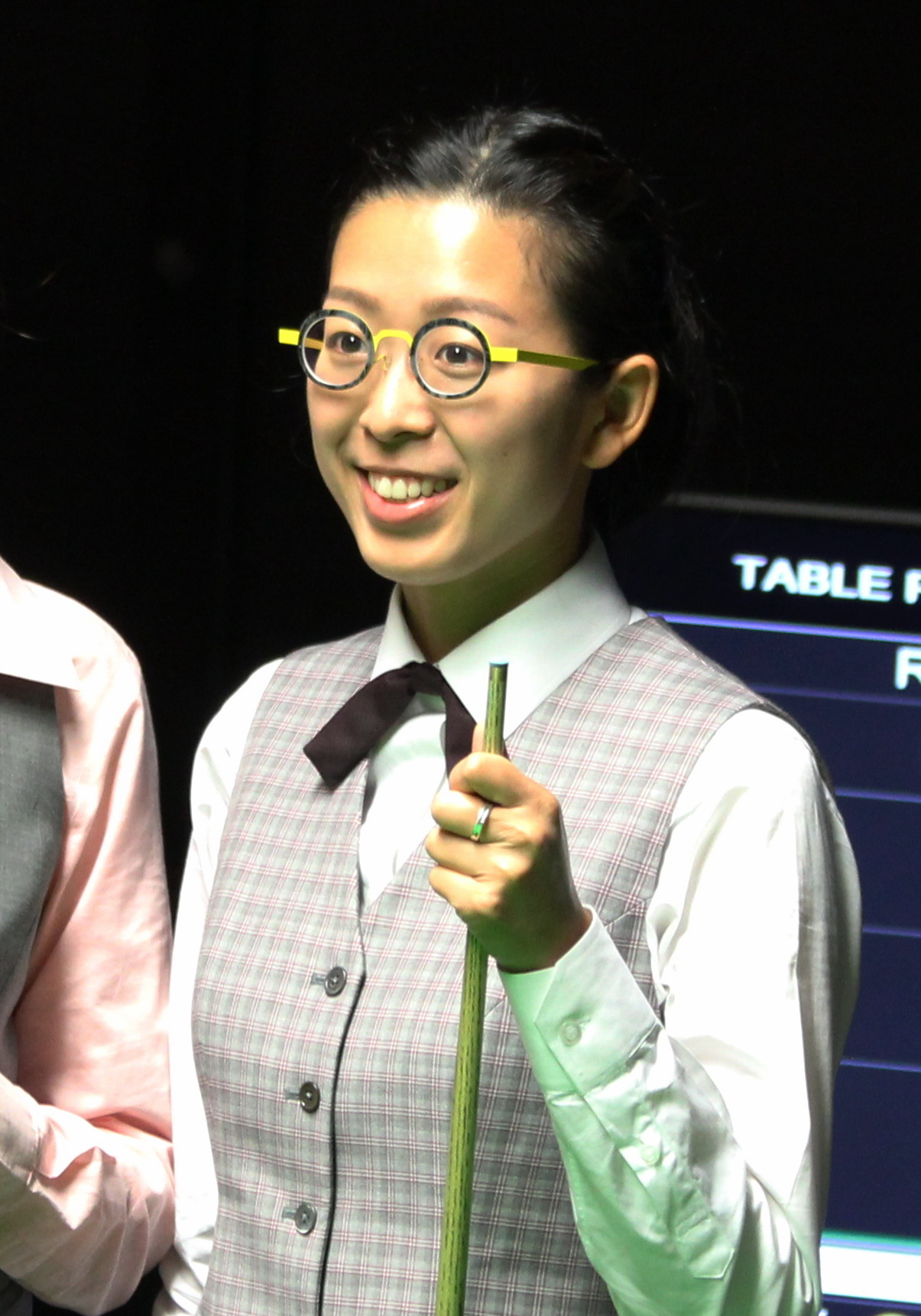
- Ng in 2017

Personal information
- Born: 17 November 1990 (age 36) British Hong Kong

Sport
- Country: Hong Kong
- Sport: Snooker
- Professional: 2021–2023, 2025–present
- Highest ranking: World Women's Snooker: 1
- Current ranking: 117 (as of 7 November 2026)
- Best ranking finish: Last 32 (2025 Championship League & 2025 Shoot Out)
Medal record
Women's snooker
Representing Hong Kong
Women's Six-red snooker
Asian Games
Gold medal – first place	2010 Guangzhou	Team
Bronze medal – third place	2010 Guangzhou	Single
Asian Indoor and Martial Arts Games
Silver medal – second place	2013 Incheon	Single
Bronze medal – third place	2017 Ashgabat	Single

Ng On-yee
- Traditional Chinese: 吳安儀
- Simplified Chinese: 吴安仪
Transcriptions
Standard Mandarin
- Hanyu Pinyin: Wú Ānyí
Yue: Cantonese
- Jyutping: Ng^{4} On^{1} Ji^{4}
- IPA: [ŋ ɔn.ji˩]

Ng On-yee BBS MH (Chinese: 吳安儀; born 17 November 1990) is a Hong Kong professional snooker player who has won three IBSF World Snooker Championships and three World Women's Snooker world championships. She is currently the world number one in women's snooker.

After competing in several International Billiards and Snooker Federation (IBSF) tournaments, Ng became the youngest-ever IBSF women's world champion at the age of 19 and successfully defended the title the following year. At the 2015 World Ladies Snooker Championship she defeated Reanne Evans—who had held the title for the previous ten years—in the semi-final and won the title. After losing the final of the same tournament to Evans the following year, Ng regained the title in 2017, defeating Evans 5–4 in the semi-final and overcoming Vidya Pillai 6–5 in the protracted final. In 2018, Ng won the title for a third time and in 2019 she collected her third IBSF World Title.

Ng took up snooker at the age of 13 after being impressed by her father's skill at the game. She has been supported by the Hong Kong Sports Institute since 2010. Her highest break in competition is 139, which she achieved at the 2018 Australian Women's Open.

== Early life ==
Ng was born on 17 November 1990. She grew up in Hong Kong, within the working-class district of Sham Shui Po. She began learning to play snooker at the age of 13 in the snooker hall in which her father worked. He encouraged her to take up the game because she was lacking direction, performing poorly at school, and spending a lot of time playing online games. Ng was impressed by her father's playing ability and attire; she took up the sport and was coached by her father. She started entering tournaments in 2006.

She would practise the sport for between five and six hours daily; in one of her practice routines, Ng would cue through a small ring placed on the table to help assess her accuracy. Her first international tournament was the 2006 IBSF Women's Championship in Amman. In 2007 and 2008, she won the Hong Kong Under-21 Snooker Open Championships, in which she competed against male players.

Ng left school at 17 to concentrate on her snooker skills but later returned to studying, and in 2016 gained a Higher Diploma in accounting from the School of Professional and Continuing Education of the University of Hong Kong.

== Career ==
Since 2010, Ng has been supported by the Hong Kong Sports Institute (HKSI), where she is an elite sports scholarship athlete. In 2015, she was receiving HKD25,000 a month from the HKSI.

=== 2007–2009: IBSF tournament success ===
Ng's first experience of an international snooker competition was at the 2006 IBSF Women's Championship in Amman, Jordan, where she won three of her eight matches in the qualifying group, winning 13 frames and losing 16.

In the group stage of the 2007 IBSF World Under-21 Snooker Championship, she recorded a 3–0 win over Hasani Armaghan of Iran and a 3–1 win over Arantxa Sanchis but lost 0–3 to Bi Zhu Qing. She also achieved 3–0 wins over Ramona Belmont of New Zealand, and Aakanksha Singh and Keerath Bhandaal from India, the latter of whom was aged 11. In the semi-final, Ng won the first frame against her opponent Belmont, who took the next one. Ng won the following two frames to face Bi Zhu Qing in the final, in which Ng lost the first two frames then equalised the score to 2–2 before losing the last two frames. Bi won the match 4–2.

Ng lost her quarter-final match 2–3 to Bi Zhu Qing at the 2007 Asian Indoor Games in Macau in November 2008.

In the qualifying group for the 2009 IBSF World Snooker Championship, Ng lost 2–3 to Ramona Belmont, whom she had defeated twice in the 2007 under-21 championship, and then bested Anuja Chandra 3–1 and Yu Ching Ching 4–2. In the last-16 round, Ng was trailing 0–2 to Yu Ching Ching but won four frames in a row to win the match 4–2. In the semi-finals, Ng faced Belmont and prevailed 4–3, having led 2–0 before falling behind 2–3. In the final, Ng produced some impressive long potting and defeated Kathy Parashis, a 10-time winner of the Australian Open, 5–1. When Ng was leading 3–1, the players were summoned to drug tests and returned to take the remaining frame she required to win the match, becoming the youngest-ever IBSF women's champion at the age of 19.

Ng was omitted from the Hong Kong squad for the 2009 East Asian Games, which were held in Hong Kong soon after her victory in the IBSF World Championship, because she was unable to attend the team training camp.

=== 2010–2011: Second IBSF world title ===
At the 2010 Asian Games, Ng won the gold medal as a member of the women's six-red snooker team, along with So Man Yan and Jaique Ip. She also won a bronze medal for reaching the semi-finals in the six-red singles competition. She lost 3–4 to Chen Siming in the semi-finals of the individual competition.

On 15 December 2010, Ng successfully defended her IBSF World Snooker Championship title in Syria, defeating compatriot Jaique Ip 5–0 in the final. Having won the first three frames comfortably, Ng won the last two frames on the black ball. On her way to the final, Ng won all six of her matches in the qualifying group without losing a frame. She then defeated Eslami Taherh 4–0 in the last 16, Anuja Chandra 4–3 in the quarter-finals—the only match in which Ng lost any frames—and Vidya Pillai 4–0 in the semi-finals. Ng reached the quarter-final of the 2011 WLBSA World Championship, losing 1–4 to eventual winner Reanne Evans.

=== 2012: First ranking event win ===
Ng won her first women's ranking event, the 2012 Northern Championship, without losing a frame during the tournament. She bested Maria Catalano 3–0 in the final.

Having won the previous two IBSF world championships, in 2009 and 2010, Ng topped her qualifying group in 2012 by winning all four matches. She then progressed by defeating Arantxa Sanchis 4–1 in the last 16, Nicha Pathomekmongkhon 4–2 in the quarter-finals, and Siraphat Chitchomnart 4–2 in the semi-finals. In the final, Ng won only the third frame, losing 1–5 to Wendy Jans. In the WLBSA World Championship, Ng won all of her five qualifying group matches but lost in the last 16 to Yu Ching Ching.

=== 2013: Six-reds success ===
Ng won a silver medal at the 2013 Asian Indoor and Martial Arts Games in Six-red snooker in July, losing 3–4 to Amornrat Uamduang in the final. At the WLBSA World Championship, she lost 0–4 to Maria Catalano in the semi-finals.

In October 2013, Ng won the inaugural IBSF World Six-red snooker Championship in Carlow, Ireland. In the final, her opponent Daria Sirotina failed to score in three of the four frames Ng won to take the title 4–0, the frame scores being 34–0, 43–0, 45–37 and 42–0. Ng was also, with So Man Yee, runner-up in the Six-red team event. In November of the same year, Ng won the World Ladies Billiards and Snooker Association (WLBSA) UK Ladies' Championship, defeating Maria Catalano 4–2 in the final.

=== 2014: World Championship runner-up ===
Ng won the WLBSA Southern Classic in February with a victory over Maria Catalano in the final. She was the losing finalist in the WLBSA World Championship, losing 0–6 to Reanne Evans after winning 3–0 against Laura Evans, 4–2 against Tatjana Vasiljeva and 4–3 against Emma Bonney to reach the final. Ng also reached the semi-finals of the IBSF World Championship, losing 1–4 to Wendy Jans.

=== 2015: Ladies' World Champion ===
In February 2015, Ng lost 1–5 to Reanne Evans in the final of the Eden Resources Masters tournament.

At the 2015 World Ladies Snooker Championship held in Leeds, England, Ng topped her qualifying group. Three frames were played in each match; Ng won 3–0 wins over Annette Newman, Gaye Jones and Michelle Brown, and had a 2–1 win over Yana Shut. In the last 16, she defeated Anastasia Tumilovich 3–0, and in the quarter-finals bested Emma Cunningham 4–0. In the semi-finals, she faced Reanne Evans, winner of the title in each of the previous ten years. Ng took the first frame 63–51, scoring a break of 44, but then lost the next two frames. A clearance of 33 saw Ng take the fourth frame 53–43 to equalize at 2–2. She then took the lead by winning the fifth frame 84–0 with breaks of 25 and 55. In a close sixth frame, Ng cleared the last four colours to win the frame 51–47 and the match 4–2, ending Evans' decade-long reign as champion. Emma Bonney won the first two frames of the final, winning them 59–22 and 68–38. Ng won the scrappy, 47-minute third frame 45–11. The highest break in the fifth frame, which took 46 minutes and 58 seconds, was eight (red, pink, red from Bonney), with Ng taking it 72–20. Ng then made five breaks in the twenties and won the next three frames to become the first new world ladies' champion since Reanne Evans won the first of her ten consecutive titles.

On 11 August 2015, Ng defeated India's Vidya Pillai 5–2 in the World Ladies Championship final in Karachi, Pakistan, to claim her second IBSF World Six-red women's title. Ng emerged from the qualifying groups in fourth place overall and defeated Arantxa Sanchis 4–0 and Amee Kamani 4–1 to reach the final.

=== 2016: World Championship runner-up ===
Ng reached the final of the 2016 Eden Classic, defeating fellow Hong Kong players Katrina Wan 3–2 and Jaique Ip 4–1 after qualifying for the knockout stages but Ng lost 1–4 to Reanne Evans in the final. Ng and her playing partner Katrina Wan Ka Kai won the 2016 World Women's Snooker pairs title by defeating Maria Catalano and Tatjana Vasiljeva 4–1 in the final.

At the 2016 World Ladies Snooker Championship, the top-eight seeds, including defending champion Ng, were placed in the knockout and each faced a qualifier. Ng progressed to the final without losing a frame, besting Laura Evans 3–0, Katrina Wan 4–0, and Rebecca Kenna 4–0. In the final, Reanne Evans took the first frame but Ng won three in a row to go two frames ahead. Evans won the next two frames to equalize at 3–3. Ng then took the seventh frame to lead 4–3. Evans then won three consecutive frames to take the match 6–4 and win the title.

Ng was granted a wild card for the 2016 World Snooker Championship as the Women's World Champion, and became the first Asian woman to play in the World Snooker Championship, losing 1–10 to Peter Lines in her first match. With Katrina Wan, Ng won the IBSF World Six-reds snooker team tournament in Sharm-El-Sheikh, Egypt, with a 4–3 victory over Vidya Pillai and Amee Kamani of India in the final. Fifteen minutes after the conclusion of the team final, Ng played Pillai in a quarter-final match of the singles and lost 2–4.

Ng won the inaugural Paul Hunter Classic, which was held in Fürth, Germany. After winning all three matches in her qualifying group 3–0, Ng won the deciding frame 4–3 against Irina Gorbataya in the last 16, having trailed 1–3. She progressed through the quarter-finals and semi-finals without losing a frame in either round. Ng won 4–0 over Wendy Jans, during the third frame of which she made the tournament's highest break, a 104. She then defeated Maria Catalano, also 4–0. In the final, Ng took a 2–0 lead against Reanne Evans, who won the third frame. Ng won the next two frames, both of which were closely contested, to win the final 4–1.

At the first Asian Billiard Sports Championships, which was held in 2016 in the United Arab Emirates, Ng defeated Arantxa Sanchis 5–1 in the semi-finals and Vidya Pillai 5–1 in the final to gain the title. Ng lost 3–4 to Reanne Evans in the semi-finals of the UK Championship in November, and 1–4 to Wendy Jans in the quarter-final of the IBSF World Snooker Championship later the same month.

=== 2017: Regains World Championship ===
In 2017, Ng supported the Hong Kong Women's Foundation campaign #MyRealCareerLine, which was set up to tackle sexism and gender inequality at work. She appeared in a YouTube video for the campaign in March 2017.

The 2017 World Women's Snooker Championship was held in Singapore, marking the first time in over 20 years the tournament had taken place outside the United Kingdom. The group stage matches were contested as best-of five frames, with all dead frames (Note: Dead frames refers to the full complement of frames being played to a finish after there is a winner) being played. Ng topped her qualifying group by winning all three of her matches: 4–1 against both Charlene Chai and Chitra Magimairaj, and a 5–0 win against Ronda Sheldreck. In the knockout stage, Ng defeated Pui Ying Mini Chu 4–0 in the last 16 and Waratthanun Sukritthanes 4–3 in the quarter-finals. She then faced defending champion Reanne Evans in the semi-finals, where she won 5–4 after recovering from a 60-points deficit in the deciding frame.

Ng's opponent in the final was Vidya Pillai, the first Indian player to reach the final of the Women's World Championship, and it was the first women's world championship final with two Asian players. Ng won the first two frames of the match before losing the next four. At 2–4 down, she won three consecutive frames for a 5–4 lead before Pillai took the tenth to force a deciding frame that lasted for over an hour. With only the pink and black balls remaining on the table, and the pink lying close to the black which was itself adjacent to one of the corner pockets, Ng fouled and left a free ball. Pillai, who was four points behind, nominated the black but miscued and hit the pink instead, also potting the black. Ng then potted the pink ball to take the frame 66–50, gaining her second world title.

With a playing time of eight hours and four minutes, the final was the longest 11-frame competitive match in snooker history, significantly exceeding the previous record of 7 hours and 14 minutes that was set at the 1992 UK Snooker Championship. Finishing at 1:30 am local time, it was the first time since 1989 the final of the Women's World Championship had ended in a deciding frame. Because the final took place on the same day as the semi-finals, Ng played for more than 12 hours across the two matches in a single day. Her prize money was £5,000, more than four times the amount awarded to the previous year's winner.

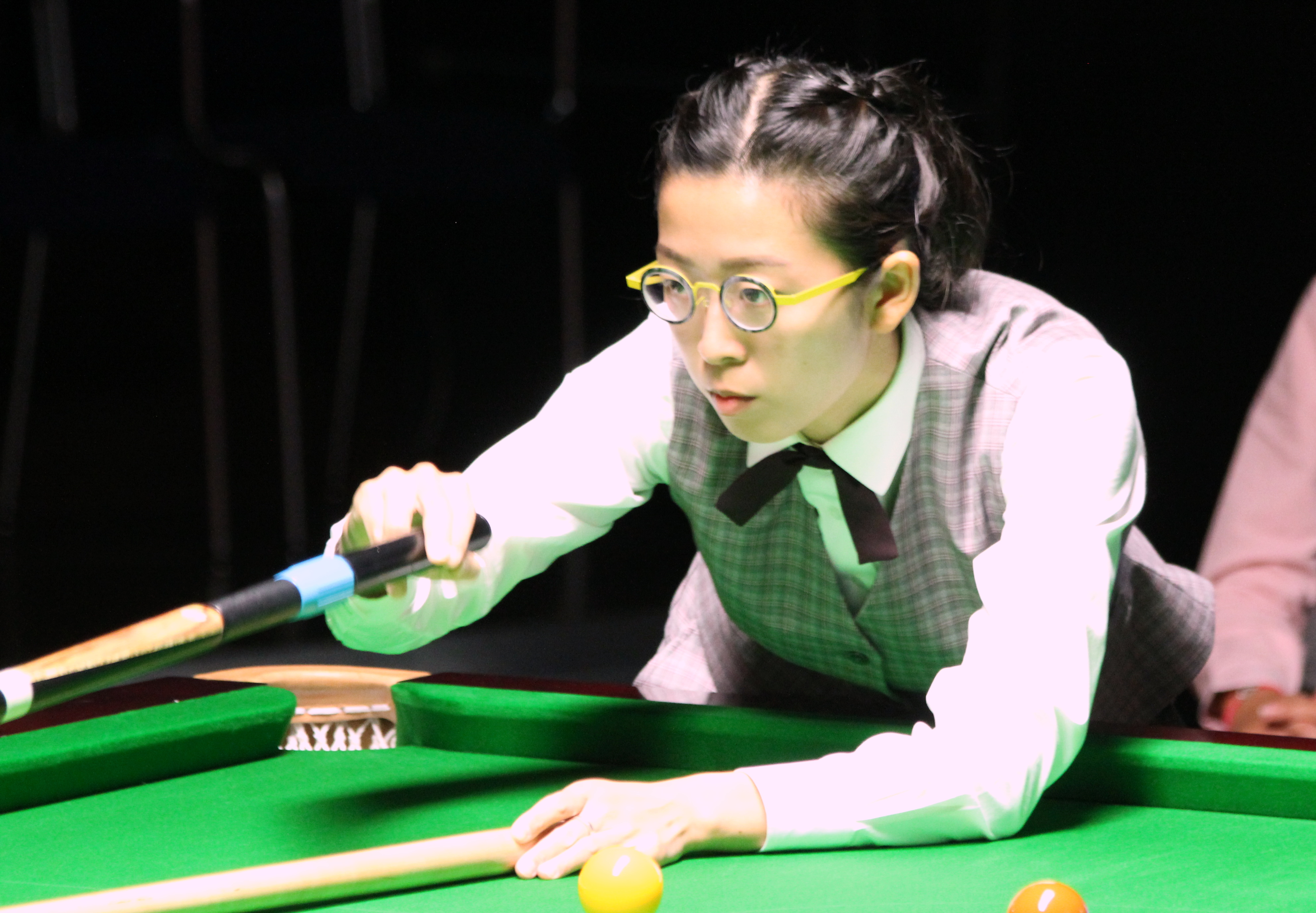
Ng at the final of the 2017 Paul Hunter Women's Classic

Ng was one of only two women competitors in the mixed singles snooker at the 2017 World Games, held in Wrocław, Poland. Ng lost in the deciding frame of her first match 2–3 against Michael Judge. Ng was seeded into the last 16 at the 2017 Paul Hunter Women's Classic in Fürth, Germany; she reached the semi-finals without losing a frame, defeating both Inese Lukashevska and Diana Stateczny 4–0. She then narrowly defeated So Man Yan 4–3 to reach the final, where she lost 1–4 to Reanne Evans, having won only the third frame.

=== 2018: Earns top ranking and retains World Championship ===
On reaching the quarter-finals of the WLBSA British Open in Stourbridge, England, in February 2018, Ng became the first Asian player to top the women's rankings. She progressed to the semi-finals, where she lost 2–4 to Nutcharut Wongharuthai.

Ng successfully defended her world championship title, without conceding a frame, at the 2018 tournament held at St. Paul's Bay, Malta. She had started with low expectations for her performance at the event because she felt unwell and under pressure, and was suffering from loss of form. Ng emerged from the qualifying stage with 3–0 wins over Judy Dangerfield, Katarzyna Bialik, and Ronda Sheldreck, and was seeded into the quarter-finals, where she defeated Wendy Jans 4–0. She then defeated Rebecca Kenna 4–0 in her semi-final, winning a place in the final with Maria Catalano, who had defeated Reanne Evans 4–3 in the other semi-final. Ng won 5–0 to gain her third world title.

Ng was runner-up in the World Women's 10-Red Championship and the World Women's Six-red Championship, which were both held in Leeds, England, in April 2018. Ng lost in the final of both tournaments to Reanne Evans. She then entered 2018 Q School in an attempt to win a place on the professional snooker tour. Ng took the 2018 UK Women's Championship title in September, defeating Suzie Opacic 3–2, Ploychompoo Laokiatphong 3–0, and Jaique Ip 4–0. In the final, she defeated Rebecca Kenna 4–1 after losing the first frame.

At the Australian Open, Ng scored a 139 break in the third frame of her semi-final against Nutcharut Wongharuthai; her then-highest break in competition. Having won all of her five qualifying matches 4–0 against Australian opponents, Ng defeated another Australian, Judy Dangerfield, 3–0 in the last 16, Pui Ying Mini Chu 4–0 in the quarter-finals, and Wongharuthai 4–2 in the semi-finals. Ng won the final, defeating Katrina Wan 4–2.

At the IBSF Six-red Women's Snooker Championship in Marsa Alam, Ng was the only player in the women's qualifying groups who did not lose a frame. In the knockout phase, she defeated Thai players Siripaporn Nuanthakhamjan 4–2 and Nutcharat Wongharuthai 4–1, before losing the final to another Thai player, Waratthanun Sukritthanes, 2–4.

=== 2019: Third IBSF world title ===
Ng reached the final of the 2019 Belgian Women's Open with wins of 3–0 over Jane O'Neill and Emma Parker, and of 4–3 over Nutcharut Wongharuthai in the semi-finals. She won the first frame of the final against Reanne Evans, but lost the next four to finish as runner-up. She also lost to Evans in the final of the World Women's 10-Red Championship in Leeds, this time 3–4.

Ng lost in the quarter-finals of the Six-red Championship to Wongharuthai, 2–3. She was also defeated by Wongharuthai 4–1 at the quarter-finals stage of the 2019 World Women's Snooker Championship, making 2019 the first year since 2012 that Ng had not reached at least the semi-finals of the tournament. Consequently, she lost the number one position that she had held for 14 months, as Reanne Evans regained the top ranking.

In April 2019, Ng played Alan McManus in the first round of qualifying at the World Snooker Championship – after winning the first two frames, she eventually lost the match 6–10. She was runner-up in the 2019 Women's Tour Championship, held at the Crucible Theatre, defeating Rebecca Kenna 2–0 in the semi-finals before losing the one-frame final to Reanne Evans.

At the Australian Women's Open in 2019, Ng and Nutcharut Wongharuthai were the only two players to complete their qualifying groups without losing a frame. Ng then registered wins over Tani Mina 3–0, Jessica Woods 3–1, and So Man Yan 4–1, to reach the final against Wongharuthai, who won the match 4–2 to gain her first ranking tournament win.

Ng won her third IBSF world snooker title in Antalya in November 2019. She dedicated her victory to Poon Ching-chiu, a fellow snooker player who had died at the age of 18 during the fortnight before the final. Ng finished top of the qualifying round, winning all four of her matches 2–0, before defeating Joy Lyn Willenberg 3–0 in the last 16, and Amee Kamani 4–1 in the quarter-finals. Her semi-final against Waratthanun Sukritthanes was taken to a deciding frame, but with breaks of 34 and 40, Ng won the last frame 85–0 and the match 4–3. She then played Wongharuthai in the final where, after trailing 0–2, she took five consecutive frames to win the match 5–2.

=== 2020: Belgian Open Champion ===
Ng won the 2020 Belgian Women's Open, which was her first ranking tournament victory since the 2018 Australian Open. She was seeded directly into the last-16 round, where she defeated both Albina Liashcuk and Steph Daughtery 3–0. She then bested Wongharuthai 4–2 in the semi-finals. In the final she was 2–1 ahead of Reanne Evans after losing the first frame. From 2–2, Ng won the next two frames to take the title with a 4–2 win.

Ng was given a wildcard place for the qualifying rounds of the 2020 World Snooker Championship. The final stages of the tournament were due to take place in April and May 2020 but were postponed due to the coronavirus pandemic. She declined to participate in the tournament due to COVID-19 safety concerns. With World Women's Snooker events cancelled or postponed during the coronavirus pandemic, Ng's next competitive appearance was at the 2020 Hong Kong Women's Snooker Open Championship, nine months after the Belgian Open. She won the title with a 4–0 defeat of Cheung Yee Ting in the final.

In March 2021, it was announced that Ng would be offered a two-year World Snooker tour-card, to commence in the 2021–22 snooker season.

=== 2021 onwards ===
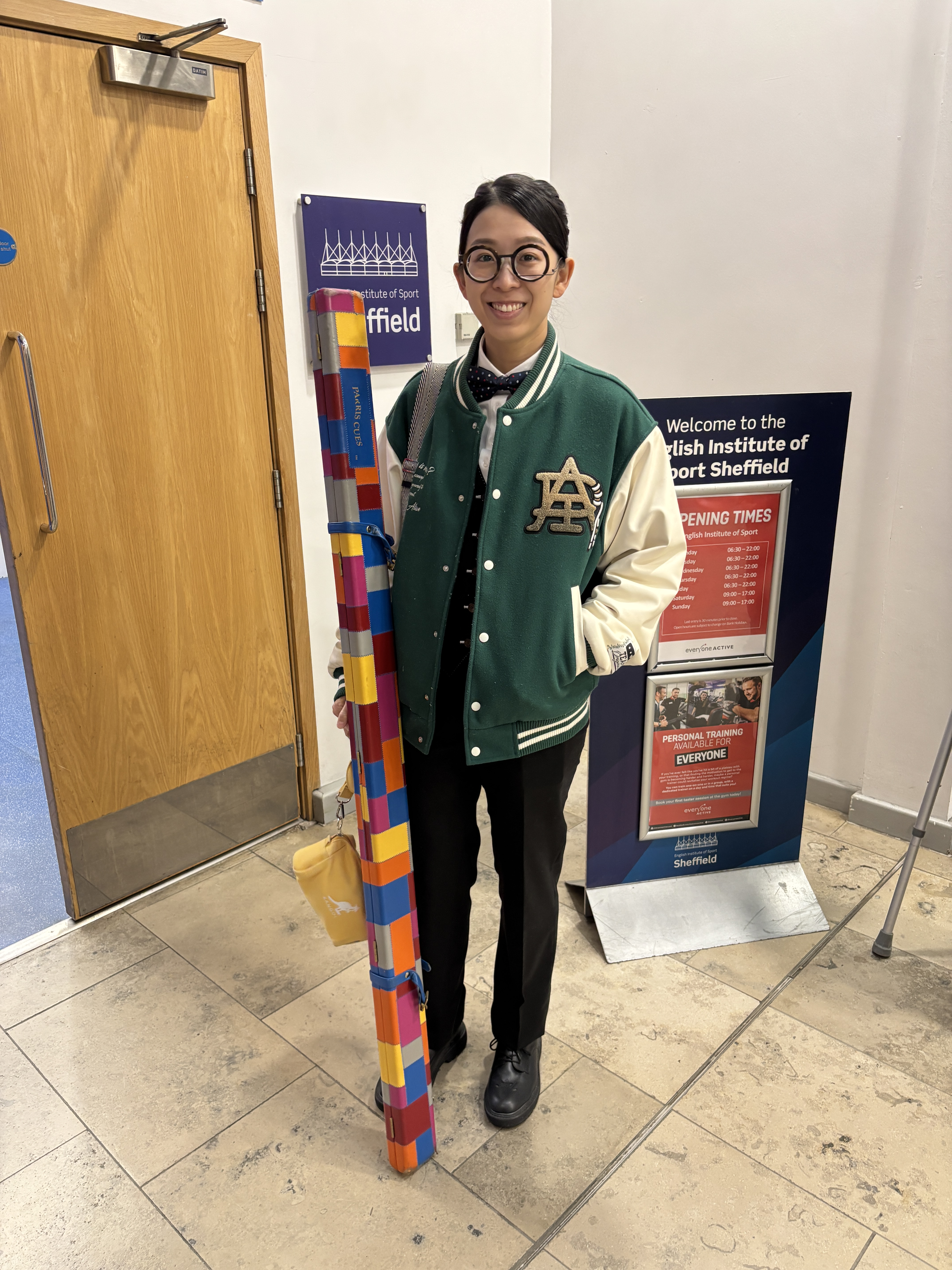
Ng at the qualifying competition for the 2026 World Snooker Championship

On the World Women's Snooker circuit for 2021–2022, there were five ranking events. Ng won the Eden Women's Masters, winning the deciding frame of her semi-final against Kenna after needing three snookers, and recovering from 1–3 against Evans in the final to win 4–3. She took the season's last ranking title, the Winchester Open, by defeating Wongharuthai 4–0 in the final.

Ng achieved her first win on the World Snooker tour by eliminating Wu Yize 4–2 at the 2022 Welsh Open. She lost 1–4 to Ali Carter in the next round. She fluked the final pink in the deciding frame to defeat 1997 world champion Ken Doherty 4–3 in the 2022 British Open qualifying, a victory she described as "one of the best of my career".

In the 2023–2024 season, Ng won three women's ranking events: the Australian Open, Albanian Open and British Open. She was also runner-up at the US Open and the Belgian Open, and finished the season at the top of the one-year ranking list. In the following season, she won the US Open and retained the British Open title, and finished the season ranked second.

She qualified again for the World Snooker Tour for two seasons starting in the 2025–26. At the 2025 Championship League (ranking), she became the first woman to reach the last 32 of a professional ranking event At the 2025 English Open, she made a 137 total clearance, breaking the record for the highest break made by a woman in professional competition. On the WWS circuit, she won the UK Women's Championship, the Belgian Women's Open and, for the third consecutive year, the British Women's Open. She was runner-up at the Women's Snooker Open in Bangkok and the WSF Women's Championship.

== Honours and awards ==
The Hong Kong government awarded Ng the Medal of Honour in 2011 for "outstanding achievements in international snooker competitions." She received a Bronze Bauhinia Star in 2017, this being the lowest of the three ranks of The Order of the Bauhinia Star, a set of awards made by the government of Hong Kong to "persons who have rendered distinguished service to the community or to their respective fields of business for a long period of time".

In March 2016, Ng was named "Best of the Best" at the Hong Kong Sports Stars Awards. She won the award again in 2018, in recognition of her achievements in 2017. Ng was named the International World Games Association Athlete of the Month in March 2017, following her victory in the 2017 World Women's Snooker Championship.

== Performance and rankings timeline ==
=== World Snooker Tour ===
Tournament	2013/ 14	2015/ 16	2016/ 17	2017/ 18	2018/ 19	2019/ 20	2020/ 21	2021/ 22	2022/ 23	2025/ 26	2026/ 27
Ranking (Note: It shows the ranking at the beginning of the season)	(Note: She was an amateur)							(Note: New players on the Main Tour don't have a ranking)	91		95
Ranking tournaments
Championship League	Non-Ranking Event						A	WD	RR	2R	RR
China Open	A	A	A	A	A	Tournament Not Held					LQ
Wuhan Open	Tournament Not Held									LQ	LQ
British Open	Tournament Not Held							WD	1R	LQ	LQ
English Open	Not Held		A	A	A	A	A	LQ	LQ	LQ	LQ
Shenzhen Open (Note: The event was called the Xi'an Grand Prix (2024/2025–2025/2026))	Tournament Not Held									LQ	LQ
Northern Ireland Open	Not Held		A	A	A	A	A	A	LQ	LQ	LQ
International Championship	A	A	A	A	A	A	Not Held			LQ	LQ
UK Championship	A	A	A	A	A	A	A	1R	LQ	LQ	LQ
Shoot Out	Not Held		A	A	A	A	A	WD	1R	3R	
Scottish Open	Not Held		A	A	A	A	A	LQ	LQ	LQ	LQ
German Masters	A	A	A	A	A	A	A	LQ	LQ	LQ	
Welsh Open	A	A	A	A	A	A	A	1R	LQ	LQ	
World Grand Prix	NH	DNQ	DNQ	DNQ	DNQ	DNQ	DNQ	DNQ	DNQ	DNQ	
Players Championship (Note: The event was called the Players Tour Championship Finals (2013/2014, 2015/2016))	DNQ	DNQ	DNQ	DNQ	DNQ	DNQ	DNQ	DNQ	DNQ	DNQ	
World Open	A	NH	A	A	A	A	Not Held			LQ	
Tour Championship	Tournament Not Held				DNQ	DNQ	DNQ	DNQ	DNQ	DNQ	
World Championship	A	LQ	LQ	LQ	LQ	A	A	LQ	LQ	LQ	
Former ranking tournaments
Paul Hunter Classic	Minor-Ranking		A	A	1R	NR	Tournament Not Held				
Gibraltar Open	NH	MR	A	A	A	A	A	1R	Not Held		
WST Classic	Tournament Not Held								1R	Not Held	
European Masters	Not Held		A	A	A	A	A	LQ	LQ	Not Held	
Saudi Arabia Masters	Tournament Not Held									1R	NH
Former non-ranking tournaments
Hong Kong Masters	Tournament Not Held			A	Tournament Not Held				QF	Not Held	
Six-red World Championship	A	A	A	A	A	RR	Not Held		LQ	Not Held	

Performance Table Legend
LQ	lost in the qualifying draw	#R	lost in the early rounds of the tournament (WR = Wildcard round, RR = Round robin)	QF	lost in the quarter-finals
SF	lost in the semi–finals	F	lost in the final	W	won the tournament
DNQ	did not qualify for the tournament	A	did not participate in the tournament	WD	withdrew from the tournament

NH / Not Held	means an event was not held.
NR / Non-Ranking Event	means an event is/was no longer a ranking event.
R / Ranking Event	means an event is/was a ranking event.
MR / Minor-Ranking Event	means an event is/was a minor-ranking event.

=== World Women's Snooker ===
Tournament	2010/ 11	2011/ 12	2012/ 13	2013/ 14	2014/ 15	2015/ 16	2016/ 17	2017/ 18	2018/ 19	2019/ 20	2021/ 22	2022/ 23	2023/ 24	2024/ 25	2025/ 26
Current tournaments
UK Championship	A	A	A	W	A	W	SF	W	W	A	A	F	SF	QF	F
Australian Open	Tournament Not Held								W	F	NH	A	W	F	A
Niche Cues Open	Tournament Not Held														F
Irish Open	Tournament Not Held														SF
WSF Women's Championship	Tournament Not Held													SF	F
Belgian Open	Tournament Not Held								F	W	NH	QF	F	SF	W
British Open	A	Not Held		A	Tournament Not Held			SF	Not Held		A	QF	W	W	W
World Championship	QF	1R	SF	F	W	F	W	W	QF	NH	QF	2R	SF	QF	SF
Former tournaments
Agnes Davies Memorial	Not Held		SF	Tournament Not Held											
Northern Championship	NH	LQ	W	Tournament Not Held											
Southern Classic	A	SF	NH	W	Tournament Not Held										
Eden Classic	Tournament Not Held				QF	F	Tournament Not Held								
Connie Gough Trophy (Note: The event was called the Connie Gough Memorial (2010/2011–2014/2015))	A	QF	1R	SF	A	A	A	Tournament Not Held							
Paul Hunter Classic	Tournament Not Held						W	F	Tournament Not Held						
European Masters	Tournament Not Held								1R	Tournament Not Held					
10-Red World Championship	Tournament Not Held							W	F	F	Tournament Not Held				
6-Red World Championship	Tournament Not Held							W	F	QF	Tournament Not Held				
Tour Championship	Tournament Not Held									F	Tournament Not Held				
Winchester Open	Tournament Not Held										W	Tournament Not Held			
Scottish Open	Tournament Not Held											SF	Tournament Not Held		
Asia-Pacific Championship	Tournament Not Held											QF	Tournament Not Held		
Albanian Open	Tournament Not Held												W	Not Held	
US Open	Tournament Not Held											A	F	W	NH
Masters	A	Not Held		SF	F	QF	QF	W	A	F	W	F	A	SF	NH

Performance Table Legend
LQ	lost in the qualifying draw	#R	lost in the early rounds of the tournament (WR = Wildcard round, RR = Round robin)	QF	lost in the quarter-finals
SF	lost in the semi-finals	F	lost in the final	W	won the tournament
DNQ	did not qualify for the tournament	A	did not participate in the tournament	WD	withdrew from the tournament

NH / Not Held	means an event was not held.
NR / Non-Ranking Event	means an event is/was no longer a ranking event.
R / Ranking Event	means an event is/was a ranking event.
MR / Minor-Ranking Event	means an event is/was a minor-ranking event.
PA / Pro-am Event	means an event is/was a pro-am event.

== Tournament finals ==
=== Individual ===
World Women's Snooker

Outcome	No.	Year	Championship	Opponent	Score	Ref.
Winner	1.	2012	WLBSA Northern Championship	Maria Catalano	3–0	
Winner	2.	2013	WLBSA UK Ladies' Championship	Maria Catalano	4–2	
Winner	3.	2014	WLBSA Southern Classic Championship	Maria Catalano	4–1	
Runner-up	1.	2014	WLBSA World Women's Snooker Championship	Reanne Evans	0–6	
Runner-up	2.	2015	Eden Resources Masters	Reanne Evans	1–5	
Winner	4.	2015	WLBSA World Women's Snooker Championship	Emma Bonney	6–2	
Winner	5.	2015	UK Ladies' Championship	Reanne Evans	5–1	
Runner-up	3.	2016	Eden Classic	Reanne Evans	1–5	
Runner-up	4.	2016	WLBSA World Women's Snooker Championship	Reanne Evans	4–6	
Winner	6.	2016	Paul Hunter Ladies' Classic	Reanne Evans	4–1	
Winner	7.	2017	World Women's Snooker Championship	Vidya Pillai	6–5	
Winner	8.	2017	LITEtask World Women's Six-red Championship	Emma Bonney	4–2	
Winner	9.	2017	World Women's 10-Red Championship	Laura Evans	4–2	
Runner-up	5.	2017	Paul Hunter Women's Classic	Reanne Evans	1–4	
Winner	10.	2017	LITEtask UK Women's Championship	Reanne Evans	4–1	
Winner	11.	2017	Eden Women's Masters	Reanne Evans	4–3	
Winner	12.	2018	Women's World Snooker Championship	Maria Catalano	5–0	
Runner-up	6.	2018	World Women's 10-Red Championship	Reanne Evans	1–4	
Runner-up	7.	2018	World Women's Six-red Championship	Reanne Evans	3–4	
Winner	13.	2018	2018 LITEtask UK Women's Championship	Rebecca Kenna	4–1	
Winner	14.	2018	Australian Women's Open	Katrina Wan	4–2	
Runner-up	8.	2019	Belgian Women's Open	Reanne Evans	1–4	
Runner-up	9.	2019	World Women's 10-Red Championship	Reanne Evans	3–4	
Runner-up	10.	2019	Women's Tour Championship	Reanne Evans	0–1	
Runner-up	11.	2019	Australian Open	Nutcharut Wongharuthai	2–4	
Runner-up	12.	2019	Eden Women's Masters	Reanne Evans	2–4	
Winner	15.	2020	Belgian Women's Open	Reanne Evans	4–2	
Winner	16.	2021	Women's Masters	Reanne Evans	4–3	
Winner	17.	2022	Winchester Women's Open	Nutcharut Wongharuthai	4–0	
Runner-up	13.	2022	UK Women's Championship	Reanne Evans	3–4	
Runner-up	14.	2022	Women's Masters	Nutcharut Wongharuthai	0–4	
Runner-up	15.	2023	US Open	Nutcharut Wongharuthai	2–4	
Winner	18.	2023	Australian Open	Amee Kamani	4–1	
Runner-up	16.	2024	Belgian Open	Nutcharut Wongharuthai	2–4	
Winner	19.	2024	Albanian Open	Nutcharut Wongharuthai	4–3	
Winner	20.	2024	British Open	Nutcharut Wongharuthai	4–1	
Winner	21.	2024	US Open	Anupama Ramachandran	4–0	
Runner-up	17.	2024	Australian Open	Nutcharut Wongharuthai	3–4	
Winner	22.	2025	British Open	Nutcharut Wongharuthai	4–3	
Runner-up	18.	2025	UK Women's Championship	Bai Yulu	2–4	
Runner-up	19.	2025	Niche Cues Women's Open	Bai Yulu	1–5	
Runner-up	20.	2026	WSF Women's Championship	Bai Yulu	0–4	
Winner	23.	2026	Belgian Open	Nutcharut Wongharuthai	4–2	
Winner	24.	2026	British Open	Bai Yulu	4–2	

Others

Outcome	No.	Year	Championship	Opponent	Score	Ref.
Runner-up	1.	2007	IBSF World Under-21 Snooker Championship	Bi Zhu Qing	2–4	
Winner	1.	2009	IBSF World Snooker Championship	Kathy Parashis	5–1	
Bronze (semi-final)	1.	2010	Asian Games – Six-red snooker	Chen Siming	3–4	
Winner	2.	2010	IBSF World Snooker Championship	Jaique Ip	5–0	
Runner-up	2.	2012	IBSF World Snooker Championship	Wendy Jans	1–5	
Silver	3.	2013	Asian Indoor and Martial Arts Games – Six-red snooker	Amornrat Uamduang	3–4	
Winner	3.	2013	IBSF Six-red snooker Championship	Daria Sirotina	4–0	
Winner	4.	2015	IBSF Six-red Championship	Vidya Pillai	5–2	
Winner	5.	2016	ACBS Asian Billiard Sports Championship – Six-red snooker	Vidya Pillai	5–1	
Winner	6.	2017	ACBS Asian Ladies Snooker Championship	Waratthanun Sukritthanes	3–2	
Winner	7.	2017	IBSF Six-red Snooker Championship	Siripaporn Nuanthakhamjan	4–0	
Bronze	2.	2017	Asian Indoor and Martial Arts Games – Six-red snooker	Waratthanun Sukritthanes	2–4	
Winner	8.	2018	European Women's Masters (Challenge Cup) (Note: For players that did not reach the quarter-finals of the main competition)	Katrina Wan	2–0	
Runner-up	4.	2018	IBSF Six-red Women's Snooker Championships	Waratthanun Sukritthanes	2–4	
Winner	9.	2019	ACBS Asian Ladies Snooker Championship	Bai Yulu	3–2	
Winner	10.	2019	IBSF World Snooker Championship	Nutcharut Wongharuthai	5–2	
Runner-up	5.	2023	IBSF World Snooker Championship	Bai Yulu	0–4	
Winner	11.	2024	IBSF Mongolia World Cup	Anupama Ramachandran	3–0	
Winner	12.	2024	IBSF Six-red Snooker Championship	Fong Mei Mei	4–3	
Runner-up	6.	2024	IBSF World Snooker Championship	Ploychompoo Laokiatphong	2–3	
Runner-up	7.	2025	ACBS Asian Ladies Snooker Championship	Narantuya Bayarsaikhan	0–3	
Runner-up	8.	2025	IBSF World Snooker Championship	Anupama Ramachandran	2–3	

=== Team ===
Outcome	No.	Year	Championship	Opponents in the final	Score	Ref.
Gold	1.	2010	Asian Games – Six-red snooker, with Jaique Ip and So Man Yan (Hong Kong)	Bi Zhu Qing, Chen Siming, Chen Xue (China)	3–1	
Winner	2.	2011	WLBSA World Ladies Pairs Championship, with So Man Yan	Tatjana Vasiljeva and Kim O'Brien	2–0	
Winner	3.	2013	WLBS World Ladies Pairs Championship, with So Man Yan	Maureen Rowland and Tatjana Vasiljeva	2–0	
Runner-up	1.	2013	IBSF Six-red Team Snooker Championship, with So Man Yan (Hong Kong 1)	Vidya Pillai and Arantxa Sanchis (India 1)	2–3	
Winner	4.	2014	WLBS World Ladies Pairs Championship, with So Man Yan	Reanne Evans and Anita Maflin	3–1	
Winner	5.	2016	IBSF Six-red Team Snooker Championship, with Katrina Wan (Hong Kong 1)	Amee Kamani and Vidya Pillai (India 1)	4–3	
Winner	6.	2016	WLBS World Ladies Pairs Championship, with Katrina Wan	Maria Catalano and Tatjana Vasiljeva	4–1	
Runner-up	2.	2017	IBSF Six-red Team Snooker Championships, with Katrina Wan (Hong Kong 1)	Waratthanun Sukritthanes and Siripaporn Nuanthakhamjan (Thailand)	1–3	
Runner-up	3.	2019	Women's Snooker World Cup, with Ho Yee Ki (Hong Kong A)	Waratthanun Sukritthanes and Siripaporn Nuanthakhamjan (Thailand A)	0–4	

=== Hong Kong Championships ===
Snooker

Outcome	No.	Year	Championship	Opponent in the final	Ref.
Winner	1.	2007	Hong Kong Under-21 Snooker Open Championships		
Winner	2.	2008	Hong Kong Under-21 Snooker Open Championships	Tse Hon Lun	
Runner-up	1.	2010	Hong Kong Women's Six-red Snooker Open Championships	3–5 Jaique Ip	
Winner	3.	2013	Hong Kong Women's Six-red Snooker Open Championships	Jaique Ip	
Winner	4.	2013	Hong Kong Women's Snooker Championship	So Man Yan	
Winner	5.	2014	Hong Kong Women's Open Championship	So Man Yan	
Winner	6.	2016	Hong Kong Women's Snooker Open Championship	Chu Pui Ying	
Winner	7.	2017	Hong Kong Women's Snooker Open Championship	4–0 Jaique Ip	
Winner	8.	2018	Hong Kong Women's Snooker Open Championship	Chu Pui Ying	
Runner-up	2.	2018	Asian Women's Snooker Invitational Championship		
Winner	9.	2019	Hong Kong Women's Snooker Open Championship	4–0 Cheung Yee Ting	
Winner	10.	2020	Hong Kong Women's Snooker Open Championship	4–0 Cheung Yee Ting	
Winner	11.	2021	Hong Kong Women's Snooker Open Championship	So Man Yan	
Runner-up	3.	2021	Hong Kong Snooker Open Championship 2021 – Event 2	Chau Hon Man	

Pocket Billiards (pool)

Outcome	No.	Year	Championship	Ref.
Winner	1.	2007	Hong Kong Pocket Billiard Open Championship (Women)	
