= 2019 World Women's Snooker Championship =

Amateur snooker championship, held June 2019

Tournament information
- Dates: 20–23 June 2019
- Venue: Hi-End Snooker Club
- City: Bangkok
- Country: Thailand
- Organisation: World Women's Snooker, World Snooker Federation
- Format: Round Robin for qualifying groups, Single elimination
- Total prize fund: £14,700
- Winner's share: £6,000
- Highest break: Reanne Evans (ENG) (92)

Final
- Champion: Reanne Evans (ENG)
- Runner-up: Nutcharut Wongharuthai (THA)
- Score: 6–3

The 2019 World Women's Snooker Championship was a women's snooker tournament that took place at the Hi-End Snooker Club, Bangkok from 20 to 23 June 2019. Reanne Evans won the event with a 6–3 victory against Nutcharut Wongharuthai in the final. This was Evans' twelfth world championship victory.

== Prize fund ==
The breakdown of prize money for the event is shown below:

- Winner: £5,500
- Runner-up: £2,500
- Semi-final: £1,250
- Quarter-final: £500
- Last 16: £250
- Highest break: £200
- Total: £14,700

== Participants ==
Participants had to be nominated by their national snooker federations. The top 30 players in the World Women's Snooker rankings following the Festival of Women's Snooker events were eligible, and national federations were each able to nominate up to eight further players.

The event featured 53 players, from 14 different countries. There were twelve seeded players for the qualifying phase, with one drawn into each of the twelve qualifying groups.

Players Participating, by Country (Seedings for the qualifying groups are in brackets)
Country	Players	Names
Australia	5	Belinda Ngo, Janine Rollings, Jessica Woods, Judy Dangerfield, Theresa Whitten
Belgium	1	Wendy Jans (12)
England	6	Reanne Evans (2), Rebecca Kenna (3), Emma Parker (7), Stephanie Daughtery (8), Connie Stephens, Fran Calvert,
Germany	1	Diana Schuler (6)
Hong Kong	7	Ng On-yee (1), Ho Yee Ki (10), Pui Ying Mini Chu (11), Jaique Ip Wan In, Mei Mei Fong, So Man Yan, Yee Ting Cheung
India	8	Arantxa Sanchis, Chitra Magimairaj, Devanshi Galundia, Indira Gowda, Neeta Kothari, Pooja Galundia, Revanna Umadevi, Varshaa Sanjeev
Iran	3	Parisa Darvishvand, Sara Baharvandi, Zeinab Shahi
(Republic of Ireland) Ireland	1	Ronda Sheldreck
Japan	2	Muramatu Sakura, Tani Mina
Malaysia	3	Shok Shea Tan, Siew Boon Lim, Sook Kwan Lee
Russia	2	Aleksandra Riabinina, Ksenia Zhukova
Singapore	2	Charlene Chai, Tan Bee Yen
Thailand	11	Nutcharut Wongharuthai (4), Waratthanun Sukritthanes (9), Baipat Siripaporn, Chanidapha Wongharuthai, Panchaya Channoi, Petlada Auerpongpan, Pimchanok Phoemphu, Ploychompoo Laokiatphong, Sasicha Nakprasit, Thitaporn Nakkaew, Vutthiphan Kongkaket
Wales	1	Laura Evans (5)

== Tournament summary ==
=== Qualifying Groups ===
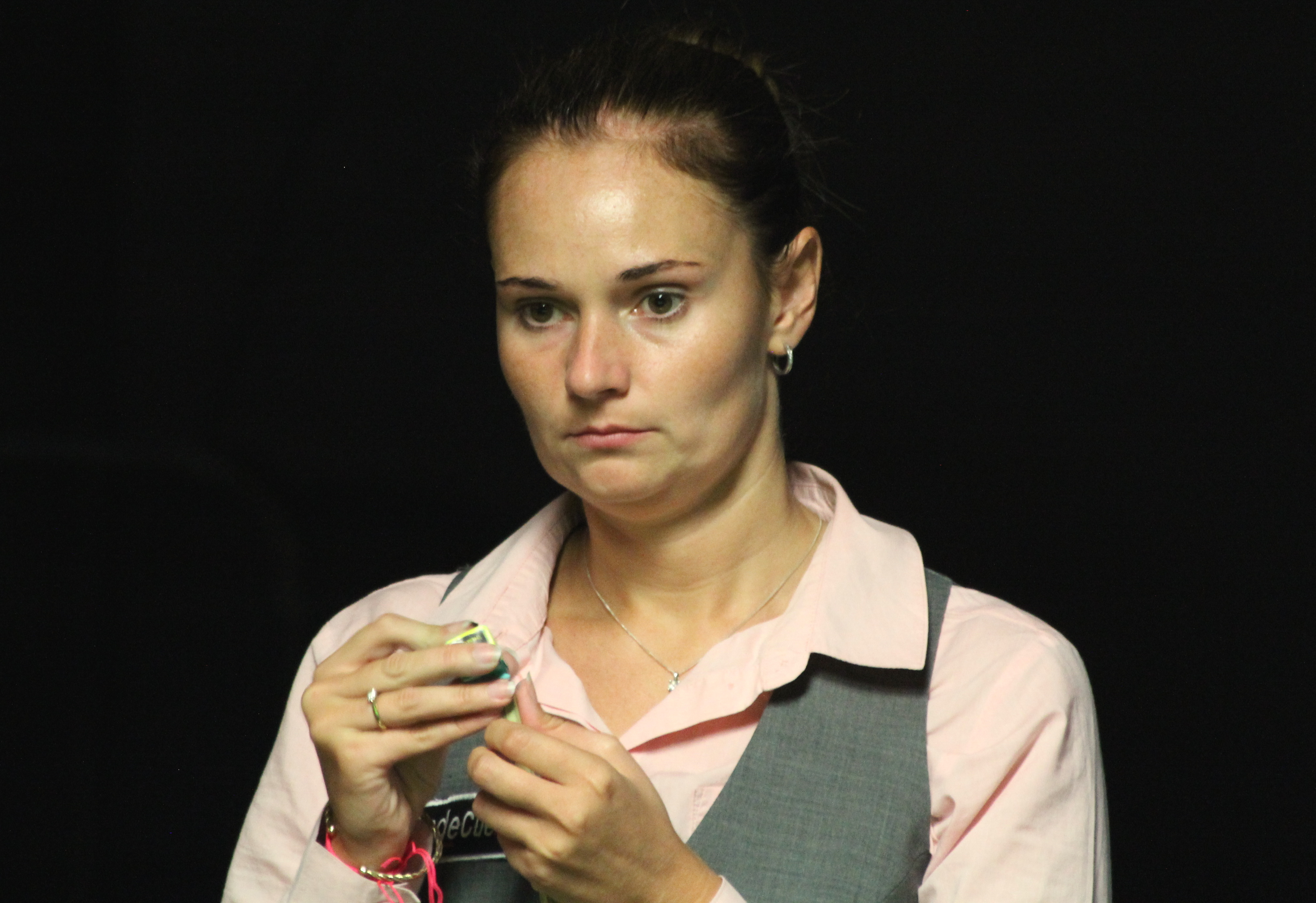
Reanne Evans

The group stage began 20 June. There were twelve groups, each with either four or five players. The top two qualifiers from each group proceeded into the knockout stage. Reanne Evans and Wendy Jans were the only two players not to lose a frame in qualifying and were seeded first and second respectively into the knockout stage. All of the original top twelve seeds qualified for the knockout.

=== Main draw knockout ===
Wendy Jans continued her good run from the qualifying groups with 4–0 wins over Arantxa Sanchis in the last 16 and Ploychompoo Laokiatphong to reach 17 frames won with none lost in the tournament to that point. Baipat Siripaporn fluked the pink and left herself with an easy pot on the black in the deciding frame of their quarter-final match to beat Rebecca Kenna 4–3. Defending champion Ng On-yee was also beaten in a quarter-final match, losing 1–4 to Nutcharut Wongharuthai. In the semi-finals, Evans beat Baipat Siripaporn 5–3 and Wongharuthai beat Jans 5–2.

Evans beat Wongharuthai 6–3 in the final to win her twelfth World Women's Snooker Championship title, maintaining her record of never having lost in the final, and collected a prize of £6,000. An early day motion congratulating Evans on her win was tabled in the Parliament of the United Kingdom by Ian Austin, the Member of Parliament for Dudley North.

The highest break of the tournament was 92 by Evans.

=== Challenge Cup ===
So Man Yan won the Challenge Cup event for players who did not qualify for the knockout rounds of the main competition, beating Chitra Magimairaj 3–2 in the final.

== Results ==
=== Main draw ===
Players listed in bold indicate match winner.

Round 1 Best of 7 frames
(Australia) **Jessica Woods**	**4**
(Hong Kong) Pui Ying Mini Chu	1
(India) **Varshaa Sanjeev**	**4**
(Russia) Ksenia Zhukova	1
(Germany) Diana Schuler	1
(Hong Kong) **Mei Mei Fong**	**4**
(England) **Rebecca Kenna**	**4**
(India) Revanna Umadevi	1
(Thailand) **Nutcharut Wongharuthai**	**4**
(Hong Kong) Ho Kee Yi	0
(England) Stephanie Daughtery	1
(Hong Kong) **Yee Ting Cheung**	**4**
(Thailand) **Ploychompoo Laokiatphong**	**4**
(Australia) Belinda Ngo	0
(India) **Arantxa Sanchis**	**4**
(Thailand) Petlada Auerpongpan	2

Round 2 Best of 7 frames
(England) **Reanne Evans (1)**	**4**
(Australia) Jessica Woods	1
(Thailand) **Waratthanun Sukritthanes**	**4**
(India) Varshaa Sanjeev	2
(Thailand) **Baipat Siripaporn**	**4**
(Hong Kong) Mei Mei Fong	0
(England) Emma Parker	1
(England) **Rebecca Kenna**	**4**
(Wales) Laura Evans	0
(Thailand) **Nutcharut Wongharuthai**	**4**
(Hong Kong) **Ng On-yee**	**4**
(Hong Kong) Yee Ting Cheung	0
(Hong Kong) Siew Boon Lim	0
(Thailand) **Ploychompoo Laokiatphong**	4
(Belgium) **Wendy Jans (2)**	**4**
(India) Arantxa Sanchis	0

Quarter-finals; Best of 7 frames
(England) **Reanne Evans (1)**	**4**
(Thailand) Waratthanun Sukritthanes	2
(Thailand) **Baipat Siripaporn**	**4**
(England) Rebecca Kenna	3
(Thailand) **Nutcharut Wongharuthai**	**4**
(Hong Kong) Ng On-yee	1
(Thailand) Ploychompoo Laokiatphong	0
(Belgium) **Wendy Jans (2)**	**4**

Semi-finals; Best of 9 frames
(England) **Reanne Evans (1)**	**5**
(Thailand) Baipat Siripaporn	3
(Thailand) **Nutcharut Wongharuthai**	**5**
(Belgium) Wendy Jans (2)	2

Final; Best of 11 frames
(England) **Reanne Evans (1)**	**6**
(Thailand) Nutcharut Wongharuthai	3

=== Final ===
Source: WPBSA Tournament Manager.

Final: Best-of-11 frames Bangkok, 23 June 2019.
**Reanne Evans** (England)		**6**–3			Nutcharut Wongharuthai (Thailand)				
Frame	1	2	3	4	5	6	7	8	9
Reanne Evans; 30+ Breaks	63 -	**64** -	**73** -	5 -	**73** -	**53** -	0 -	**92** (92)	**70** (43)
Nutcharut Wongharuthai; 30+ Breaks	**82** (61)	37 -	43 -	**87** (45)	8 -	35 -	**84** (56)	0 -	32 -
Frames won (Evans first)	0–1	1–1	2–1	2–2	3–2	4–2	4–3	5–3	6–3
92		Highest break			61				
1		50+ breaks			2				
1		30+ breaks			1				
**Reanne Evans wins the 2019 World Women's Snooker Championship**
