= 2023 UK Women's Snooker Championship =

Women's snooker tournament

Tournament information
- Dates: 22–24 September 2023
- Venue: Northern Snooker Centre
- City: Leeds
- Country: England
- Organisation: World Women's Snooker
- Highest break: Ng On-yee (HKG) (79)

Final
- Champion: Reanne Evans (ENG)
- Runner-up: Bai Yulu (CHN)
- Score: 4‍–‍1

The 2023 UK Women's Snooker Championship (officially the 2023 Taom UK Women's Snooker Championship) was a women's snooker tournament that took place from 22 to 24 September 2023 at the Northern Snooker Centre in Leeds, England. It was organised by World Women's Snooker.

Reanne Evans was the defending champion, having defeated Ng On-yee 4‍–‍3 in the 2022 final. Evans defeated Bai Yulu 4‍–‍1 in the final to retain the title. The highest break of the tournament was the 79 made by Ng in the quarter-finals.

It was Evans's fourth successive UK title win, and her 12th in all. Evans defeated Jamie Hunter, Anupama Ramachandran and Ng to reach the final, where she took a 2–0 lead against Bai. Bai won frame three, but scored only 13 points across the next two frames as Evans competed her victory with a pot success rate of 93% and a safety success rate of 85% during the match. Bai had eliminated Tessa Davidson in the last-16 round and met world number one Mink Nutcharut in the quarter finals. Bai twice leveled the match from a frame behind and then won the deciding frame with a break of 69. She then overcame reigning world champion Baipat Siripaporn 4–2 in the semi-finals. Evans overtook Ng to move to second place in the rankings updated after the tournament, with Nutcharut retaining the top position.

In side events, Mary Talbot-Deegn won the Challenge Cup, contested by players who did not reach the last 16 of the main competition, defeating Chloe Payne 2–0 in the final. Tessa Davidson took the Seniors title with a 2–0 win over Diana Schuler. Natasha Chethan won the under-21 title by defeating Zoe Killington in the one=frame final. The final of the British Open under-21 championship which had been held over from May due to a lack of time was played during the UK Championship; Bai defeated Sophie Nix 2–1.

== Format ==
The top five players—Reanne Evans, Mink Nutcharut, Ng On-yee, Rebecca Kenna and Emma Parker—were seeded through to the last-16. The remaining players were drawn in ten groups, each containing four players. Those matches were played as the best of 3 frames. The top two players from each group qualified for the knockout stage: the two best group winners progressed to the last-16, while the remaining eighteen had to play a last-32 round. The last-32 round, the last-16 round and the quarter-finals were played as the best of 5 frames. The semi-finals and the final were played as the best of 7 frames.

== Knockout ==
The draw for the tournament's knockout rounds is shown below. The match winners are shown in bold.

**Last 32**; Best of 5 frames
Connie Stephens (ENG)	0
**Jamie Hunter (ENG)**	**3**
**Jasmine Bolsover (ENG)**	**3**
Sarah Dunn (ENG)	1
Lynn Shi (CHN)	0
**Anupama Ramachandran (IND)**	**3**
Gillian Hayes (SCO)	0
**Natasha Chethan (IND)**	**3**
Mary Talbot (ENG)	1
**Varshaa Sanjeev Kumar (IND)**	**3**
**Steph Daughtery (ENG)**	**3**
Diana Schuler (GER)	0
Yee Ting Cheung (HKG)	0
**Bai Yulu (CHN)**	**3**
**Hannah Jones (ENG)**	**3**
Chucky Preston (NIR)	1
**Emma Parker (ENG)**	**3**
Chloe Payne (ENG)	1

**Last 16**; Best of 5 frames
**Reanne Evans (ENG)**	**3**
Jamie Hunter (ENG)	1
Jasmine Bolsover (ENG)	0
**Anupama Ramachandran (IND)**	**3**
**Rebecca Kenna (ENG)**	**3**
Natasha Chethan (IND)	1
Varshaa Sanjeev Kumar (IND)	0
**Ng On-yee (HKG)**	**3**
**Mink Nutcharut (THA)**	**3**
Steph Daughtery (ENG)	0
**Bai Yulu (CHN)**	**3**
Tessa Davidson (ENG)	1
**Amee Kamani (IND)**	**3**
Hannah Jones (ENG)	0
Emma Parker (ENG)	2
**Baipat Siripaporn (THA)**	**3**

**Quarter-finals**; Best of 5 frames
**(England) Reanne Evans**	**3**
(India) Anupama Ramachandran	1
(England) Rebecca Kenna	0
**(Hong Kong) Ng On-yee**	**3**
(Thailand) Mink Nutcharut	2
**(China) Bai Yulu**	**3**
(India) Amee Kamani	1
**(Thailand) Baipat Siripaporn**	**3**

**Semi-finals**; Best of 7 frames
**(England) Reanne Evans**	**4**
(Hong Kong) Ng On-yee	1
**(China) Bai Yulu**	**4**
(Thailand) Baipat Siripaporn	2

**Final**; Best of 7 frames
**(England) Reanne Evans**	**4**
(China) Bai Yulu	1
