= 2024 UK Women's Snooker Championship =

Women's snooker tournament

Tournament information
- Dates: 6–8 September 2024
- Venue: Northern Snooker Centre
- City: Leeds
- Country: England
- Organisation: World Women's Snooker
- Highest break: Bai Yulu (CHN) (99)

Final
- Champion: Bai Yulu (CHN)
- Runner-up: Reanne Evans (ENG)
- Score: 4‍–‍0

The 2024 UK Women's Snooker Championship (officially the 2024 Taom UK Women's Snooker Championship) was a women's snooker tournament that took place from 6 to 8 September 2024 at the Northern Snooker Centre in Leeds, England. It was organised by World Women's Snooker.

Reanne Evans was the defending champion, having defeated Bai Yulu 4‍–‍1 in the 2023 final. In the semi-finals, Bai defeated world number one Mink Nutcharut 4–1, after winning the first frame by a single point and then losing the second frame. Evans, winner of the title in the previous four years, and seeking a 13th UK title, lost the first frame of her semi-final match to Rebecca Kenna but went on to prevail 4–1.

In a repeat of the 2023 final, Bai defeated Evans 4‍–‍0. It was the first time since 2012 that neither Evans or Ng On-yee had won the title. Snooker Scene reporter Annette Lord wrote that the final was "one way traffic" as Bai "capitalised on a below par Evans performance"; Evans's highest break during the final was 14.

The highest break of the tournament was the 99 made by Bai in the third frame of her semi-final match.

In side events, Jasmine Bolsover won the Challenge Cup, contested by players who did not reach the quarter-finals of the main competition, defeating Amee Kamani 2–1 in the final after eliminating Ellise Scott, Zoe Killington, Sarah Dunn and Chloe Payne in earlier rounds. Tessa Davidson took the Seniors title with a 2–0 win over Dunn. Scott, aged 13, won the under-21 title with a 2–1 defeat of Payne.

== Format ==
The top five players—Reanne Evans, Bai Yulu, Mink Nutcharut, Ng On-yee and Rebecca Kenna—were seeded through to the last-16. The remaining players were drawn in eight groups, each containing four players. Those matches were played as the best of 3 frames. The top two players from each group qualified for the knockout stage: the six best group winners progressed to the last-16, while the remaining ten had to play a preliminary round. The first knockout round, the last-16 round and the quarter-finals were played as the best of 5 frames. The semi-finals and the final were played as the best of 7 frames.

== Knockout ==
The draw for the tournament's knockout rounds is shown below. The match winners are shown in bold.

**Preliminary round** Best of 5 frames
Hannah Jones (ENG)	2
**Amee Kamani (IND)**	**3**
**Daisy May Oliver (ENG)**	**3**
Chloe Payne (ENG)	2
Diana Schuler (GER)	0
**Mei Mei Fong (HKG)**	**3**
Rose Nicholson (ENG)	0
**Mary Talbot (ENG)**	**3**
Zoe Killington (ENG)	1
**Emma Powers-Richardson (ENG)**	**3**

**Last 16**; Best of 5 frames
**Reanne Evans (ENG)**	**3**
Amee Kamani (IND)	2
**Man Yan So (HKG)**	**3**
Jasmine Bolsover (ENG)	1
**Rebecca Kenna (ENG)**	**3**
Daisy May Oliver (ENG)	0
Mei Mei Fong (HKG)	1
**Ng On-yee (HKG)**	**3**
**Mink Nutcharut (THA)**	**3**
Mary Talbot (ENG)	1
Yee Ting Cheung (HKG)	2
**Baipat Siripaporn (THA)**	**3**
Tessa Davidson (ENG)	2
**Anupama Ramachandran (IND)**	**3**
Emma Powers-Richardson (ENG)	0
**Bai Yulu (CHN)**	**3**

**Quarter-finals**; Best of 5 frames
**(England) Reanne Evans**	**3**
(Hong Kong) Man Yan So	0
**(England) Rebecca Kenna**	**3**
(Hong Kong) Ng On-yee	0
**(Thailand) Mink Nutcharut**	**3**
(Thailand) Baipat Siripaporn	1
(India) Anupama Ramachandran	1
**(China) Bai Yulu**	**3**

**Semi-finals**; Best of 7 frames
**(England) Reanne Evans**	**4**
(England) Rebecca Kenna	1
(Thailand) Mink Nutcharut	1
**(China) Bai Yulu**	**4**

**Final**; Best of 7 frames
(England) Reanne Evans	0
**(China) Bai Yulu**	**4**
