= 2012 World Ladies Snooker Championship =

Women's snooker event, held April 2012

Tournament information
- Dates: April 2012
- Venue: Cambridge Snooker Centre
- City: Cambridge
- Country: England
- Organisation: World Ladies Billiards and Snooker Association
- Format: Round Robin, Single elimination
- Winner's share: £400
- Highest break: Maria Catalano (116)

Final
- Champion: Reanne Evans (ENG)
- Runner-up: Maria Catalano (ENG)
- Score: 5–3

The 2012 Women's World Snooker Championship was a women's snooker tournament that took place at the Cambridge Snooker Centre in April 2012. The event was the 2012 edition of the World Women's Snooker Championship first held in 1976. It was won by England's Reanne Evans, who defeated Maria Catalano 5–3 in the final to win her eighth consecutive world title. Catalano won the first frame of the final on the blue, and at the interval, the players were level at 2–2. Evans took the fifth frame with a break of 50 and then won the sixth to lead 4–2. Catalano made a 48 break in reducing her deficit to 3–4, but then Evans, who had recently started playing again after three months suffering from pleurisy, took the last frame and the title. Evans received £400 prize money as champion.

Twenty-four players competed in four Round Robin groups to determine the sixteen players for the knockout stages. Emma Bonney was the only player to win all fifteen frames in her group matches. The highest break of the tournament was a 116 compiled by Catalano in the first frame of her semi-final match.

== Prize Fund ==
- Winner: £400
- Runner-up: £225
- Semi-finals: £120
- Quarter-finals: £80
- Last 16: £40

== Knockout stage ==
Players listed in bold indicate match winner.

**Last 16**; Best of 5 frames
(England) **Maria Catalano** | **3**
(England) Vicky Shirley | 0
(Sweden) **Eva Palmius** | **3**
(England) Suzie Opacic | 2
(Latvia) **Tatjana Vasiljeva** | **3**
(Hong Kong) Jaique Ip | 1
(Hong Kong) **Yu Ching Ching** | **3**
(Hong Kong) Ng On-yee | 1
(England) **Reanne Evans** | **3**
(India) Chitra Magimairaj | 0
(Hong Kong) **So Man Yan** | **3**
(Germany) Natascha Niermann | 1
(England) Jenny Poulter | 0
(England) **Katie Henrick** | **3**
(England) Christine Sharpe | 1
(England) **Emma Bonney** | **3**

**Quarter-finals**; Best of 5 frames
(England) **Maria Catalano** | **3**
(Sweden) Eva Palmius | 1
(Latvia) **Tatjana Vasiljeva** | **3**
(Hong Kong) Yu Ching Ching | 2
(England) **Reanne Evans** | **3**
(Hong Kong) So Man Yan | 0
(England) **Katie Henrick** | **3**
(England) Emma Bonney | 1

**Semi-finals**; Best of 7 frames
(England) **Maria Catalano** | **4**
(Latvia) Tatjana Vasiljeva | 2
(England) **Reanne Evans** | **4**
(England) Katie Henrick | 0

**Final**; Best of 9 frames
(England) Maria Catalano | 3
(England) **Reanne Evans** | **5**

== Final ==
Final: Best-of-9 frames Cambridge Snooker Centre; April 2012
| **Reanne Evans** (England) | | **5**–3 | | | Maria Catalano (England) | | | |
| Frame | 1 | 2 | 3 | 4 | 5 | 6 | 7 | 8 |
| Reanne Evans; 40+ Breaks | 39 – | **75** - | **70** - | 25 - | **66**; 50 | **63** - | 54; 47 | **60** - |
| Maria Catalano; 40+ Breaks | **73** – | 42 - | 54 - | **70** - | 8 - | 33 - | **57**; 48 | 38 - |
| Frames won (Evans first) | 0–1 | 1–1 | 2–1 | 2–2 | 3–2 | 4–2 | 4–3 | 5–3 |
| 50 | | Highest break | | | 48 | | | |
| 2 | | 40+ breaks | | | 1 | | | |
**Reanne Evans wins the 2012 World Ladies Snooker Championship**
