= Hong Kong Sports Stars Awards =

Hong Kong Sports Stars Awards (Traditional Chinese: 香港傑出運動員選舉)

By virtue of the SF&OC’s input and effort, Hong Kong sports have gradually gained a high status in society. As an incentive to Hong Kong athletes’ persistent excellent achievements in international and regional events, the sports and corporations aspired to set up a reward mechanism to encourage Hong Kong sports elites and teams to strive for excellence in the games; to encourage Hong Kong young people to regard them as role models; and to promote sports for all people in order to develop Hong Kong sports culture. In view of this, the inaugural “Hong Kong Sports Stars Awards” was set up in 1986.

== History ==
=== Corporate Organisers (1986~1992) ===
In November 1986, nominations from the ASF&OC member associations were accepted for the inaugural “Hong Kong Sports Stars Awards”, the first awards of this kind in Hong Kong sport history. There were 44 finalists, and 6 winners were announced in April 1987.

The inaugural Awards were presented by Swire Coca-Cola HK Ltd. and co-organised by the ASF&OC, the Council for Recreation and Sport, the Urban Council and the Regional Council. Due to the restrictions of the Olympic Committee’s principle of amateurism, the grants of HKD$6,000 for the athletes could only be used for the development of their affiliated sports programmes.

The 2nd Award Ceremony was held in 1987, with grants raised to HKD$10,000. A lucky draw was added for the voters, and the champion was awarded a pure gold commemorative medallion. The 3rd Award Ceremony was held in collaboration between the organiser and the Jubilee Sports Centre so that winning athletes were awarded free membership to use the sports science utilities and medical facilities at the Jubilee Sports Centre. A “Wall of Honors for Outstanding Athletes” was also set up at the Jubilee Sports Centre on 6 January 1989. In addition, the organisers set up the “Hong Kong Junior Sports Stars Awards” to award the training fee of HKD$3,000 per winning new talent for six potential young athletes under the age of 18 who had achieved outstanding performances over the previous year.

The awarding system was criticized for its defects. The fencing team that won the bronze medal for Hong Kong at the 1990 Asian Games was not listed because the scoring system was unfavorable to team events. As a result, the organiser set up an additional award for teams in 1991.

In 1991, the 5th Award Ceremony included a new “Best of the Best” Award (Best Athlete of the Year Award) . The winner was the then 22-year-old Lee Lai-shan. Wong Kam-po, the gold medallist in Asian Junior Cycling Championships, also won the Junior Sports Star Award for the first time.

=== Council for Recreation and Sport Joined as Co-organiser (1992~1999) ===
In 1992, the Council for Recreation and Sport joined as co-organiser for the Award and the then Hong Kong Governor Chris Patten attended to present the awards. The Sports Stars quota was increased from six to ten in 1998, and returned to six in 1999. In the meantime, a voting website was created for public voting.

=== SF&OC Succeeded as Organiser ===
In November 2000, Swire Coca-Cola HK Ltd. announced that it would terminate its role as organiser for the Hong Kong Sports Stars Awards. The role was taken by the SF&OC and the LCSD, whereas the Hong Kong Sports Development Board took the co-organising role, with the SF&OC Honorary Secretary General Pang Chung as Chairman of the Organising Committee. To ensure that awards were fairly evaluated, nominations were accepted from all SF&OC sports associations. To safeguard credibility, the jury comprised a group of experienced sports personalities, local sports media and citizens who voted via the digital interactive phone voting system

“Sports Stars Awards”, “Junior Sports Stars Awards” and “Sports Team of the Year Awards” were retained in this edition of the Awards. Six athletes won in each of the “Sports Stars Awards” and “Junior Sports Stars Awards”.

The Award Ceremony was held at the SF&OC Annual Spring Dinner on 22 January 2001. The Award Ceremony took the form of a “Hong Kong Sports Oscar”, as expressed in the organisers’ slogan. The SF&OC’s Hong Kong Sports Stars Awards 2001 continued the success of the previous year. The Hong Kong Potential Sports Stars Awards and the Hong Kong Best Improvement Sports Stars Awards were added as new initiatives. “Hong Kong Well Being Stars Awards” was added to the Hong Kong Sports Stars Awards 2002 to commend athletes who had shown the Olympic Spirit, fairness in competitions, and sportsmanship in their sports career. Cycling athlete Wong Kam-po was the winner of this award.

The 2004 Award Ceremony was organised solely by the SF&OC, with the SF&OC Vice President Vivien C.C. Lau as Chair of the Election Organising Committee and the LCSD as co-organiser. The number of winners was increased from six to eight to recognize athletes’ extraordinary achievements in both the Olympic Games and the Paralympic Games in Athens.

The “Sports Team of the Year Awards” was divided into “Team Only Sport ” and “Team Event ” Awards. Meanwhile, four of the categories were open for public voting, instead of just one as in the previous year. The categories were Hong Kong Sports Stars Awards, Hong Kong Junior Sports Stars Awards, Hong Kong Sports Stars Award for Team Only Sport, and Hong Kong Sports Stars Award for Team Event. Starting from 2006, title sponsorship was provided by the Bank of China, Hong Kong. In addition, “Best of the Best” of the Hong Kong Sports Stars Award was resumed.

In 2007, So Wa-wai became the champion having broken the world record in the Men’s T36 Class 200m Sprint in the Beijing Paralympic Games and won 6 gold medals in 4 editions of the Paralympics. He was also world record holder in the Men’s T36 Class 100m Sprint. For these attainments, So was awarded the “Best of the Best” Award 2007. He was also the first athlete with a physical disability to be awarded the most prestigious honor.

In 2009, Hong Kong successfully hosted the 5th Asian Games. The Hong Kong soccer team clinched the first gold medal in the soccer event and was honoured the Hong Kong Best Team Only Sport Award.

Snooker player Ng On-yee won the "Best of the Best" award for 2015 and 2017.

The winner for 2018 was cyclist Lee Wai Sze
