= Baipat Siripaporn =

Thai snooker player

- Baipat in 2025

Personal information
- Nickname: Baipat Sriracha
- Born: 24 May 1999 (age 27)

Sport
- Country: Thailand
- Sport: Snooker
- Professional: 2023–2025
- Highest ranking: World Women's Snooker: 6 (September 2023)
Medal record
Women's snooker
Representing Thailand
Southeast Asian Games
Gold medal – first place	2025 Thailand	6-red snooker singles
Gold medal – first place	2025 Thailand	6-red snooker team

Siripaporn Nuanthakhamjan (Thai: ศิริภาพร นวนทะคำจัน, born 24 May 1999), better known as Baipat Siripaporn, is a Thai snooker player. She won the 2023 World Women's Snooker Championship, defeating Bai Yulu 6–3 in the final, which earned her a two-year tour card to the professional World Snooker Tour for the 2023–24 and 2024–25 snooker seasons.

Before becoming world champion, Siripaporn won several international amateur titles, including International Billiards and Snooker Federation six-red and junior world championships, and the 2022 ACBS Asian Snooker Championship. She also partnered Waratthanun Sukritthanes to win the inaugural Women's Snooker World Cup in 2019. After being relegated from the professional tour in 2025, she reached the semi-finals of the 2025 World Women's Snooker Championship and won two women's six-red gold medals for Thailand at the 2025 SEA Games.

== Career ==
=== Early life and junior career ===
Siripaporn Nuanthakhamjan, known as Baipat Siripaporn, was born on 24 May 1999 and is from Chonburi province, Thailand. She began playing snooker as a child and was coached by her stepfather Pisit Chandsri, a multiple International Billiards and Snooker Federation (IBSF) World Masters champion. A 2024 profile in SiamSport reported that she first played snooker aged seven and began training seriously at eleven.

In 2014, she won the IBSF women's six-red championship, defeating Anastasia Nechaeva 4–2 in the final after having eliminated former IBSF world champion Ng On-yee. She also partnered Armornrat Uamduang to win the IBSF women's team championship that year. The following year, she won the IBSF World Under-21 Championship by defeating Mink Nutcharut 5–2. She defeated Vidya Pillai 4–0 to win another IBSF women's six-red world title in 2016, and also won the IBSF World Under-18 Championship, beating Nutcharut 3–1 in the final.

Siripaporn made her World Women's Snooker tour debut in 2017. She reached the quarter-finals of the 2017 World Women's Snooker Championship and was runner-up to Amee Kamani at the 2018 ACBS Asian Snooker Championship.

=== World Cup and Asian champion ===
In June 2019, Siripaporn and Waratthanun Sukritthanes formed the Thailand A team at the inaugural Women's Snooker World Cup in Bangkok. They defeated Thailand B 4–0 in the semi-finals before beating a Hong Kong team of Ng On-yee and Ho Yee Ki 4–0 in the final. Siripaporn potted the final black of the last frame of the match. It was the first major World Women's Snooker title for either player. She defeated Rebecca Kenna 4–3 on the final black of their quarter-final at the 2019 World Women's Snooker Championship to reach the world semi-finals for the first time, where she lost 3–5 to Reanne Evans.

She became the first woman to reach the final of an open-category Thai national snooker event when she advanced to the final of the Thailand Under-21 Championship in August 2020, losing 3–4 to Jongrak Boonraud. A few weeks later, she defeated Sukritthanes 4–1 to win the Thailand Women's Championship.

At the 2022 Asian Women's Snooker Championship, Siripaporn defeated Nutcharut 3–2 in an all-Thai final to win the singles title. Later that year she won the Thailand national women's snooker championship and also took the 9-ball pool title, defeating Sukritthanes 11–8 in the latter final.

=== World champion ===
At the 2023 World Women's Snooker Championship she topped a qualifying group that included five-time world finalist Maria Catalano and, in the knockout stages, defeated Bayarsaikhan Narantuya and Jamie Hunter before beating defending champion Nutcharut 5–2 in the semi-finals. She faced Bai Yulu in the final. Bai won the first two frames and led 3–2 at the interval, but Siripaporn won four consecutive frames after the interval to take the match 6–3. She became the second Thai player to win the women's world championship, following Nutcharut in 2022. The championship also gave her a two-year card to compete on the professional World Snooker Tour from the beginning of the 2023–24 season.

=== Professional career ===
Siripaporn at the 2025 World Snooker Championship qualifying competition; it was the last match of her two-year stint on the World Snooker Tour.

Siripaporn's first professional season began in 2023. In the qualifying competition for the 2023 English Open, she led the former world amateur champion Muhammad Asif 3–1 and had opportunities to win the fifth and sixth frames, but Asif recovered to win 4–3. World Snooker Tour described the match as Siripaporn having come close to her first victory on the professional tour.

Her world championship title also qualified her for the invitational 2023 Champion of Champions, where she faced Judd Trump in the opening round and lost 0–4. During her first season on tour, Siripaporn said she was training for at least five to six hours a day and frequently practised with fellow Thai professional Noppon Saengkham. She said that adapting to the professional tour required improvements to her break-building and safety play.

At the 2024 World Women's Snooker Championship, her defence of the world title ended in the last 16 when she lost 0–4 to Evans. Siripaporn partnered Trump at the 2024 World Mixed Doubles. They defeated defending champions Neil Robertson and Nutcharut 3–1 in their final round-robin match but failed to advance to the final on the head-to-head tiebreak.

In January 2024, Siripaporn said that professional Thai players often needed to find their own financial support, and in June Matichon reported that she had difficulties financing travel and competition on the tour because of insufficient sponsorship.

She lost her first-round match in the qualifying competition for the 2025 World Snooker Championship 2–10 to Farakh Ajaib. Following this, she was relegated from the World Snooker Tour. She did not win any matches on the Tour, although four matches went to a deciding frame. Her deciding-frame losses were 3–4 to Mohamed Elkhayat in the first round of the 2024 Saudi Arabia Masters, 3–4 to Asif in qualifying for the 2023 English Open, 5–6 to Sean O'Sullivan in qualifying for the 2023 UK Championship, and 3–4 to Liam Graham in qualifying for the 2024 Northern Ireland Open.

=== Post-professional career ===
Siripaporn reached the semi-finals of the 2025 World Women's Snooker Championship. She defeated Zhao Lu 4–1 in the last 16 and Kenna 4–2 in the quarter-finals, reaching the world semi-finals for the third time, but lost 1–5 to Nutcharut.

She won two gold medals in women's six-red snooker at the 2025 SEA Games in Thailand. She was part of Thailand's victorious six-red team and then met Nutcharut in the singles final. After falling 2–0 behind, Siripaporn won three consecutive frames, making a break of 49 in the deciding frame, to win 3–2.

At the 2026 World Women's Snooker Championship in Dongguan, she advanced from her group and defeated He Danni 3–0 in the first knockout round before losing 4–1 to Ng On-yee in the last 16. As of September 2026, she was ranked 12th on the World Women's Snooker rankings; her career-high ranking is sixth, first reached in September 2023.

== Performance timeline ==
Performance tables legend
LQ	lost in the qualifying draw	#R	lost in the early rounds of the tournament (WR = Wildcard round, RR = Round robin)	QF	lost in the quarter-finals
SF	lost in the semi-finals	F	lost in the final	W	won the tournament
NH	event was not held	A	did not participate in the tournament	WD	withdrew from the tournament

=== World Snooker Tour ===
World Snooker Tour performance
Tournament	2022/ 23	2023/ 24	2024/ 25
Ranking tournaments
Championship League	A	A	RR
European Masters	A	LQ	NH
Xi'an Grand Prix	Not Held		LQ
Saudi Arabia Masters	Not Held		1R
English Open	A	LQ	A
British Open	A	LQ	LQ
Wuhan Open	NH	LQ	LQ
Northern Ireland Open	A	LQ	LQ
International Championship	NH	LQ	LQ
UK Championship	A	LQ	LQ
Shoot Out	A	1R	1R
Scottish Open	A	LQ	LQ
German Masters	A	LQ	LQ
Welsh Open	A	LQ	LQ
World Open	NH	LQ	LQ
World Championship	LQ	LQ	LQ
Non-ranking tournaments
Champion of Champions	A	1R	A

=== World Women's Snooker ===
World Women's Snooker performance
Tournament	2016/ 17	2018/ 19	2021/ 22	2022/ 23	2023/ 24	2024/ 25	2025/ 26	2026/ 27
Current tournaments
UK Championship	A	A	A	RR	SF	QF	QF	A
Australian Open	NH	A	NH	A	A	A	A	
Niche Cues Women's Open	Not Held						QF	
Irish Women's Open	Not Held						A	
WSF Women's Championship	Not Held					A	A	
Belgian Open	NH	A	NH	A	A	A	A	
British Open	Not Held		A	2R	2R	A	A	
Masters	A	A	A	QF	A	QF	A	
World Championship	QF	SF	A	W	2R	SF	2R	
Former tournaments
10-Red World Championship	NH	2R	Not Held					
6-Red World Championship	NH	SF	Not Held					
Winchester Open	Not Held		QF	Not Held				
Scottish Open	Not Held			A	Not held			
Asia-Pacific Championship	Not Held			F	NH			
Albanian Open	Not Held				QF	Not Held		
US Open	Not Held			A	A	A	NH	

== Career finals ==
International Billiards and Snooker Federation
Year	Tournament	Venue	Winner	Runner-up	Score	Ref.
2014	IBSF Six-red Snooker Championship	Sharm El Sheikh	Siripaporn Nuanthakhamjan (THA)	Anastasia Nechaeva (RUS)	4–2	
2014	IBSF Women's Team Championship	Sharm El Sheikh	Siripaporn Nuanthakhamjan (THA) & Armornrat Uamduang (THA)	Anastasia Nechaeva (RUS) & Daria Sirotina (RUS)	4–1	
2015	IBSF World Under-21 Snooker Championship	Bucharest, Romania	Siripaporn Nuanthakhamjan (THA)	Nutcharut Wongharuthai (THA)	5–2	
2016	IBSF World Under-18 Snooker Championship	Mol, Belgium	Siripaporn Nuanthakhamjan (THA)	Nutcharut Wongharuthai (THA)	3–1	
2016	IBSF World Under-21 Snooker Championship	Mol, Belgium	Nutcharut Wongharuthai (THA)	Siripaporn Nuanthakhamjan (THA)	5–4	
2016	IBSF Six-red Snooker Championship	Sharm El Sheikh, Egypt	Siripaporn Nuanthakhamjan (THA)	Vidya Pillai (IND)	4–0	
2017	IBSF World Under-18 Snooker Championship	Beijing, China	Nutcharut Wongharuthai (THA)	Siripaporn Nuanthakhamjan (THA)	3–2	
2017	IBSF Women's Team Championship	Hurghada, Egypt	Siripaporn Nuanthakhamjan (THA) & Waratthanun Sukritthanes (THA)	Ng On-yee (HKG) & Ka Kai Wan (HKG)	3–1	
2017	IBSF Six-red Snooker Championship	Hurghada, Egypt	Ng On-yee (HKG)	Siripaporn Nuanthakhamjan (THA)	4–0	

ACBS Asian Snooker Championship
Year	Venue	Winner	Runner-up	Score	Ref.
2018	Yangon, Myanmar	Amee Kamani (IND)	Siripaporn Nuanthakhamjan (THA)	3–0	
2022	Doha, Qatar	Siripaporn Nuanthakhamjan (THA)	Nutcharut Wongharuthai (THA)	3–2	

World Women's Snooker
Year	Tournament	Venue	Winner	Runner-up	Score	Ref.
2019	Women's Snooker World Cup	Bangkok, Thailand	Siripaporn Nuanthakhamjan (THA) & Waratthanun Sukritthanes (THA)	Ng On-yee (HKG) & Ho Yee Ki (HKG)	4–0	
2023	Asia-Pacific Women's Championship	Sydney, Australia	Ploychompoo Laokiatphong (THA)	Siripaporn Nuanthakhamjan (THA)	4–1	
2023	World Women's Snooker Championship	Bangkok, Thailand	Siripaporn Nuanthakhamjan (THA)	Bai Yulu (CHN)	6–3	

Southeast Asian Games
Year	Tournament	Venue	Winner	Runner-up	Score	Ref.
2025	Women's six-red singles	Thunder Dome, Muang Thong Thani, Thailand	Siripaporn Nuanthakhamjan (THA)	Nutcharut Wongharuthai (THA)	3–2	
2025	Women's six-red team	Thunder Dome, Muang Thong Thani, Thailand	Thailand	Indonesia	3–2	
