= Cue sports at the 2010 Asian Games – Women's six-red snooker team =

Women's six-red snooker team at the 2010 Asian Games
- Venue: Asian Games Town Gymnasium
- Dates: 13–14 November 2010
- Competitors: 24 from 9 nations

Medalists
gold medal	Hong Kong; Jaique Ip, Ng On Yee, So Man Yan
silver medal	China; Bi Zhuqing, Chen Siming, Chen Xue
bronze medal	Chinese Taipei; Chan Ya-ting, Lai Hui-shan, Liu Shin-mei
bronze medal	Thailand; Suweenut Maungin, Nicha Pathomekmongkhon, Maliwan Sangklar

The women's six-red snooker team tournament at the 2010 Asian Games in Guangzhou took place from 13 November to 14 November at the Asian Games Town Gymnasium.

No seeding was used for the draw.

== Schedule ==
All times are China Standard Time (UTC+08:00)

Date	Time	Event
Saturday, 13 November 2010	10:00	Last 16
Saturday, 13 November 2010	19:00	Quarterfinals
Sunday, 14 November 2010	10:00	Semifinals
Sunday, 14 November 2010	16:30	Final

== Results ==
Last 16
India	3
Singapore	0

Quarterfinals
Chinese Taipei	3
India	1
Hong Kong	3
Vietnam	0
Philippines	0
China	3
Thailand	3
South Korea	0

Semifinals
Chinese Taipei	0
Hong Kong	3
China	3
Thailand	1

Final
Hong Kong	3
China	1

=== Last 16 ===
India	3–0	Singapore

Vidya Pillai	1–0	Amy Hoe
Chitra Magimairaj	1–0	Charlene Chai
Anuja Chandra / Chitra Magimairaj	1–0	Amy Hoe / Charlene Chai

=== Quarterfinals ===
Chinese Taipei	3–1	India

Lai Hui-shan	1–0	Anuja Chandra
Liu Shin-mei	0–1	Vidya Pillai
Lai Hui-shan / Chan Ya-ting	1–0	Vidya Pillai / Chitra Magimairaj
Liu Shin-mei	1–0	Anuja Chandra

Hong Kong	3–0	Vietnam

Jaique Ip	1–0	Đoàn Thị Ngọc Lệ
Ng On Yee	1–0	Dương Thúy Vi
Ng On Yee / So Man Yan	1–0	Đoàn Thị Ngọc Lệ / Dương Thúy Vi

Philippines	0–3	China

Mary Ann Basas	0–1	Bi Zhuqing
Floriza Andal	0–1	Chen Siming
Mary Ann Basas / Zemonette Oryan	0–1	Chen Siming / Chen Xue

Thailand	3–0	South Korea

Nicha Pathomekmongkhon	1–0	Lim Yun-mi
Suweenut Maungin	1–0	Cha Bo-ram
Nicha Pathomekmongkhon / Suweenut Maungin	1–0	Lim Yun-mi / Cha Bo-ram

=== Semifinals ===
Chinese Taipei	0–3	Hong Kong

Lai Hui-shan	0–1	Jaique Ip
Liu Shin-mei	0–1	Ng On Yee
Lai Hui-shan / Chan Ya-ting	0–1	Ng On Yee / So Man Yan

China	3–1	Thailand

Chen Siming	1–0	Suweenut Maungin
Bi Zhuqing	0–1	Nicha Pathomekmongkhon
Chen Siming / Chen Xue	1–0	Suweenut Maungin / Nicha Pathomekmongkhon
Chen Siming	1–0	Nicha Pathomekmongkhon

=== Final ===
Hong Kong	3–1	China

Jaique Ip	1–0	Bi Zhuqing
Ng On Yee	0–1	Chen Siming
Ng On Yee / So Man Yan	1–0	Chen Siming / Chen Xue
Jaique Ip	1–0	Chen Siming

== Non-participating athletes ==
- Maliwan Sangklar (THA)
