= Waratthanun Sukritthanes =

Snooker player from Thailand

Personal information
- Born: 5 December 1993 (age 32) Thailand

Sport
- Country: Thailand
- Sport: Snooker
- Highest ranking: World Women's Snooker: 12
Medal record
Women's Six-red snooker
Representing Thailand
Asian Indoor and Martial Arts Games
Silver medal – second place	2017 Ashgabat	Single

Waratthanun Sukritthanes (Thai: วรัตถนันท์ สุขฤทธาเนส; born 5 December 1993) is a snooker player from Thailand. She was the 2018 IBSF World Snooker Championship Women's Champion, and was the runner-up in 2017.

== Biography ==
Sukritthanes reached the 2017 IBSF World Snooker Championship Women's final, losing 2–5 to Wendy Jans, who won the tournament for the sixth consecutive time (and seventh overall). Sukritthanes won all of her four group matches 3–0, then beat Arantxa Sanchis 4–2 and Nutcharut Wongharuthai 4–0 to reach the final, where she lost the first two frames to Jans before levelling at 2–2 Jans then took three frames in a row to win the title.

In the 2018 ISBF Championship, Sukritthanes again came through the group stage without conceding a frame, winning her three matches 3–0, and topping the qualifying table ahead of Ng On-yee, the only other player not to have lost a frame. She then won past Arantxa Sanchis 4–2, Anastasia Nechaeva 4–0 and Amee Kamani 4–2 to set up a rematch of the previous year's final against Wendy Jans. In the final, Sukritthanes won the first frame. Jans then won the next two before Sukritthanes took four in a row, with breaks of 30 and 56 to win the final frame, and thereby the match and tournament.

She competed in the 2017 Asian Indoor and Martial Arts Games 6-reds competition, winning silver after losing to Nutcharut Wongharuthai in the final.

From 2017 to 2019, Sukritthanes reached the quarter finals of the World Women's Snooker Championship each year. In both 2017 and 2018, she won all of her qualifying group matches. In the quarter-finals, she lost 3–4 to eventual champion Ng On-yee in 2017, and 2–4 to Rebecca Kenna in 2018. In 2019 it was Reanne Evans who beat Sukritthanes 4–2 in the last eight. Evans went on to win her twelfth title.

In 2018 she was a semi-finalist in both the World Women's 10-Red Championship, winning three matches 3–0 before losing 1–3 to Reanne Evans, and the 6-red championship, where Ng On-yee beat her 3–2. Sukritthanes went a stage further in the 2019 6-reds tournament, but again lost to On-yee, this time 3–1, in the final.

In June 2019, she partnered Baipat Siripaporn to win the first Women's Snooker World Cup.

She began the 2019–20 season ranked 15th.

== Titles and achievements ==
- 2015 IBSF World Snooker Championship semi-finalist
- 2017 IBSF World Snooker Championship Women's Runner-up
- 2017 World Women's Snooker Championship quarter-finalist
- 2017 Asian Indoor and Martial Arts Games 6-red snooker silver medal
- 2018 IBSF World Snooker Championship Women's Champion
- 2018 World Women's Snooker Championship quarter-finalist
- 2018 World Women's 6-Red Championship semi-finalist
- 2018 World Women's 10-Red Championship semi-finalist
- 2019 World Women's 10-Red Championship semi-finalist
- 2019 World Women's Snooker Championship quarter-finalist
- 2019 Women's Snooker World Cup Champion (with Baipat Siripaporn)
- 2024 WPA World Heyball Championship
