= Emma Parker (snooker player) =

English snooker player

Personal information
- Born: 24 April 1999 (age 27) Hornchurch, London, England

Sport
- Country: England
- Sport: Snooker
- Highest ranking: 6 (February 2022)

Emma Parker (born 24 April 1999) is an English snooker player. She made her tournament debut at the 2015 Eden Masters, aged 15, and was number one in the women's under-21 world rankings as of April 2019. Her highest position in the senior rankings is sixth. She has reached three ranking semi-finals on the World Women's Snooker Tour.

== Career ==
Parker started playing pool at the age of four, and turned to snooker at the age of 15 after her father and uncle took her to Romford Snooker Club. In April 2017, she won the Under-21 Ladies World Championship at the Northern Snooker Center in Leeds. Following further success, she rose to 8th in the women's world rankings in September 2019.

She and fellow tour player Reanne Evans were the two women among the eight wildcards for the 128-player televised 2019 Snooker Shoot-Out, making them the first women to compete in the final stages of a televised world ranking event. Shoot Out matches are one frame and have a maximum duration of 10 minutes, with limited time allowed for each shot. Parker lost 17–61 to Laxman Rawat.

Parker won the 2020 Belgian Women's Open (Under-21) event, beating Albina Hashcuk 2–0 in the final. She also reached the semi-finals of the main 2020 Belgian Women's Open event, where she lost 0–4 to Reanne Evans. Following this, Parker reached 7th in the women's snooker rankings, a new career best for her.

== Personal life ==
Parker lives in Hornchurch, and is coached by Gary Filtness. She works full-time for an accountancy company in Hornchurch.

== Performance timeline ==
World Women's Snooker

| Tournament | 2014/ 15 | 2015/ 16 | 2016/ 17 | 2017/ 18 | 2018/ 19 | 2019/ 20 | 2020/ 21 | 2021/ 22 | 2022/ 23 |
|---|---|---|---|---|---|---|---|---|---|
Current tournaments
| UK Championship | A | A | A | 1R | RR | QF | NH | SF | 2R |
| US Open | Tournament Not Held | | | | | | | | SF |
| Australian Open | Tournament Not Held | | | | | A | A | NH | A |
| Scottish Open | Tournament Not Held | | | | | | | | 2R |
| Masters | A | RR | A | 1R | SF | QF | NH | 2R | 1R |
| Belgian Open | Not Held | | | | QF | SF | Not Held | | QF |
| Asia-Pacific Open | Tournament Not Held | | | | | | | | A |
| World Championship | A | A | A | A | 2R | Not Held | | QF | 1R |
| British Open | Not Held | | | 1R | Not Held | | | QF | |
Former tournaments
| Connie Gough Trophy | QF | A | 1R | Tournament Not Held | | | | | |
| Paul Hunter Classic | Not Held | | A | RR | Tournament Not Held | | | | |
| European Masters | Not Held | | | | QF | Not Held | | | |
| 10-Red World Championship | Not Held | | | QF | 1R | QF | Not Held | | |
| 6-Red World Championship | Not Held | | | A | 2R | 1R | Not Held | | |
| Winchester Open | Tournament Not Held | | | | | | | 1R | NH |

Performance Table Legend
| LQ | lost in the qualifying draw | #R | lost in the early rounds of the tournament (WR = Wildcard round, RR = Round robin) | QF | lost in the quarter-finals |
| SF | lost in the semi-finals | F | lost in the final | W | won the tournament |
| DNQ | did not qualify for the tournament | A | did not participate in the tournament | WD | withdrew from the tournament |

| NH / Not Held | means an event was not held. |
| NR / Non-Ranking Event | means an event is/was no longer a ranking event. |
| R / Ranking Event | means an event is/was a ranking event. |
| MR / Minor-Ranking Event | means an event is/was a minor-ranking event. |
| PA / Pro-am Event | means an event is/was a pro-am event. |

== Titles and achievements ==
| Outcome | No. | Year | Championship | Opponent | Score | Ref. |
|---|---|---|---|---|---|---|
| Winner | 1 | 2017 | Connie Gough Trophy (Challenge Cup) (Note: For players who did not reach the quarter-finals of the main event) | Heidi de Gruchy | 3–1 | |
| Winner | 2 | 2017 | LITEtask UK Women's Championship (Under-21s) | Shannon Metcalf | 3–0 | |
| Runner-up | 1 | 2017 | LITEtask UK Women's Championship (Challenge Cup) | Ho Yee Ki | 1–2 | |
| Runner-up | 2 | 2017 | Eden Women's Masters (Under-21s) | Chloe White | 2–3 | |
| Winner | 3 | 2018 | British Open (Challenge Cup) | Shannon Metcalf | 3–1 | |
| Winner | 4 | 2018 | British Open (Under-21s) | Stephanie Daughtery | 3–2 | |
| Runner-up | 3 | 2018 | World Women's Under-21 Championship | Nutcharut Wongharuthai | 0–3 | |
| Winner | 5 | 2018 | European Women's Masters (Under-21s) | Nutcharut Wongharuthai | 2–0 | |
| Winner | 6 | 2018 | World Women's Under-21 Championship (Challenge Cup) | Baipat Siripaporn | 2–1 | |
| Winner | 7 | 2020 | Belgian Women's Open (Under-21) | Albina Liashcuk | 2–0 | |
| Winner | 8 | 2020 | English Championship | Rebecca Kenna | 2–0 | |
