= Arantxa Sanchis =

Indian professional snooker player

Arantxa Lael Sanchis
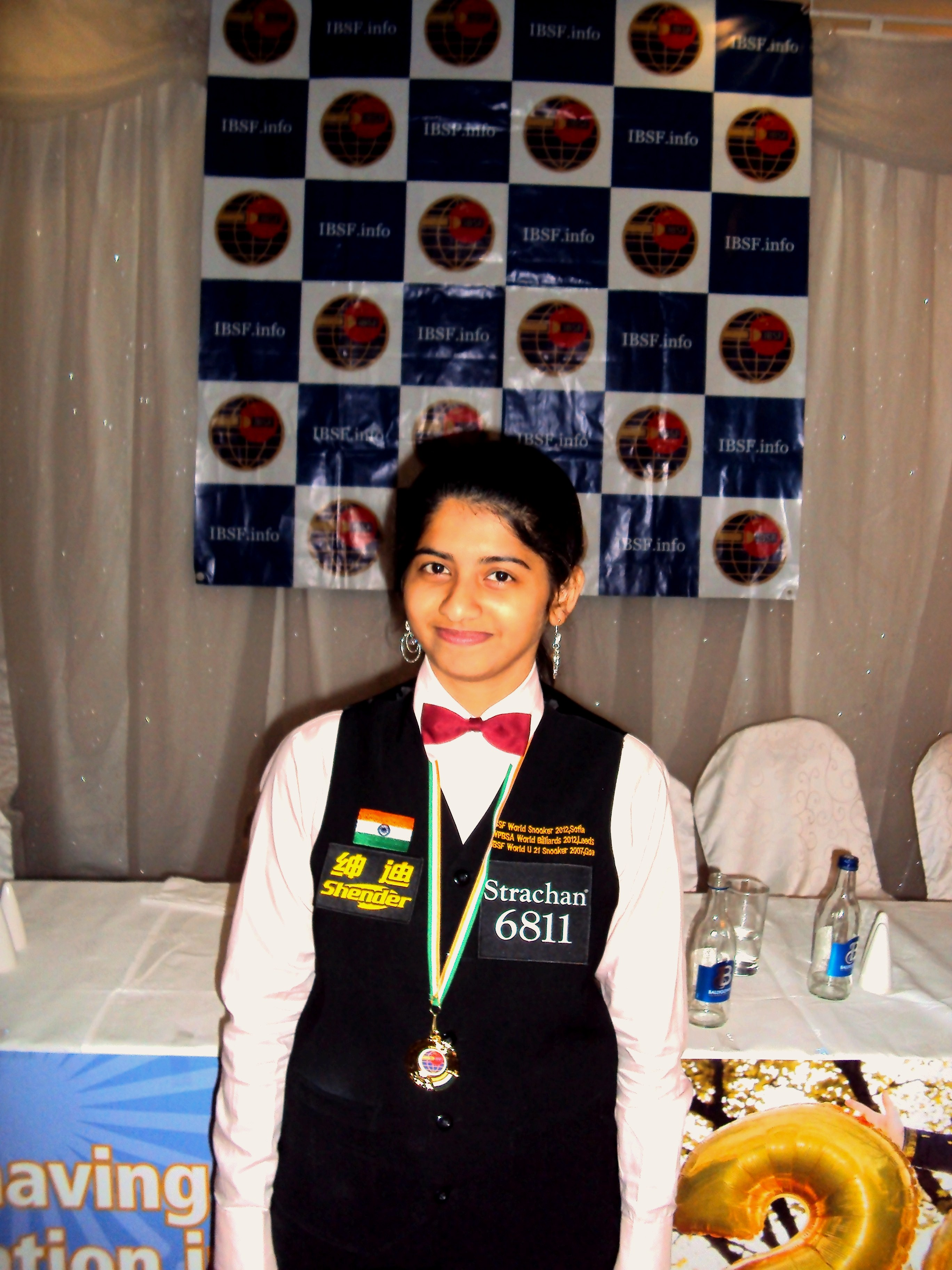

Personal information
- Born: 27 April 1990 (age 36) Mumbai, India

Sport
- Country: India
- Sport: Snooker
- Highest ranking: World No. 13 (Snooker)

Arantxa Sanchis
Medal record

Representing India

International Billiards
Gold medal – first place	IBSF World Women's Billiards Championship Adelaide, Australia	2015

International Snooker
Gold medal – first place	IBSF World Women's Team Snooker Championship Carlow, Ireland	2013
Bronze medal – third place	IBSF World Women's Snooker Championship Antalya, Turkey	2019
Bronze medal – third place	IBSF World Women's Team Snooker Championship Sharm el-Sheikh, Egypt	2016

Asian Snooker
Bronze medal – third place	ACBS Women's Snooker Championship Chandigarh, India	2019
Bronze medal – third place	ACBS Women's Six Red Snooker Championship Fujairah, UAE	2016

National Billiards - Senior
Gold medal – first place	National Billiards Championship Kolkata, India	2015
Gold medal – first place	National Billiards Championship Pune, India	2012
Silver medal – second place	National Billiards Championship Indore, India	2016
Bronze medal – third place	National Billiards Championship Pune, India	2020
Bronze medal – third place	National Billiards Championship Indore, India	2019
Bronze medal – third place	National Billiards Championship Lucknow, India	2014

National Snooker - Senior
Gold medal – first place	National 6 Red Snooker Championship Mumbai, India	2012
Silver medal – second place	National Snooker Championship Indore, India	2019
Silver medal – second place	National Snooker Championship Pune, India	2017
Silver medal – second place	National Snooker Championship Chennai, India	2011
Bronze medal – third place	National 6 Red Snooker Championship Ahmedabad, India	2020

National Billiards - Junior
Gold medal – first place	National Billiards Championship Pune, India	2010
Gold medal – first place	National Billiards Championship Agra, India	2009
Gold medal – first place	National Billiards Championship Indore, India	2008

National Snooker - Junior
Gold medal – first place	National Snooker Championship Agra, India	2009
Gold medal – first place	National Snooker Championship Indore, India	2008
Silver medal – second place	National Snooker Championship Pune, India	2010

National Billiards – Sub-Junior
Gold medal – first place	National Billiards Championship Indore, India	2008

National Snooker – Sub-Junior
Gold medal – first place	National Snooker Championship Indore, India	2008

State Snooker - Senior
Gold medal – first place	Maharashtra State Snooker Championship Mumbai, India	2011
Gold medal – first place	Maharashtra State Snooker Championship Mumbai, India	2009
Silver medal – second place	Maharashtra State Snooker Championship Mumbai, India	2007

Arantxa Sanchis is a female professional English billiards and snooker player from India. She won a gold medal in the Women's Team event at the inaugural IBSF World 6-Red Snooker and Team Snooker Championship in Carlow, Ireland, on 6 October 2013. It was a historic first gold medal for Indian women's snooker at a World Championship. On 27 September 2015, she won the inaugural IBSF World Billiards Championship in Adelaide, Australia. This feat made her the only woman in the world to hold IBSF World titles in both billiards and snooker.

In addition, she won the bronze medal at the IBSF World Team Snooker Championship at Sharm el-Sheikh, Egypt, in July 2016. This was followed up by a bronze medal at the ACBS Asian 6 Red Snooker Championship at Fujairah, United Arab Emirates, in September 2016.

Sanchis was the best-performing Indian female cueist for the year 2019. She won a bronze medal at the ACBS Asian Snooker Championship at Chandigarh, India, in May 2019. This was followed up with another bronze medal at the IBSF World Women's Snooker Championship at Antalya, Turkey, in November 2019.

In recognition of her achievements in the sport, she was presented with the Phoenix Leading Lady Award 2020 for Personal Excellence in Sports organised by Phoenix Market City.

Prior to this she has won ten national and two Maharashtra State Championships. She made history and created a record by winning four titles at a single nationals (Indore 2008). This made her the first-ever Indian cueist (male or female) to accomplish this feat. She won the National Senior Women's Billiards Championship in 2012 and 2015, and the National Six Red Snooker Championship in 2012. At 17 years of age, she represented India at the 2007 IBSF World Under-21 Snooker Championship, held in Goa, and was a semi-finalist.

On 3 December 2015, Sanchis was conferred with the Shiv Chhatrapati Award—Maharashtra's highest sporting honor—for her achievements in the sports of billiards and snooker.

== Early life ==
Arantxa Lael Sanchis was born on 27 April 1990 in Mumbai, Maharashtra. She was named after the Spanish professional tennis player Arantxa Sánchez Vicario. Arantxa is the daughter of a retired Indian Army officer, Colonel EJ Sanchis, an alumnus of the National Defence Academy (NDA), Khadakwasla; who trained at the Indian Military Academy (IMA), Dehradun and served for around three decades in the Corps of Engineers of the Indian Army. He was the commander in-charge of the rescue operation of the Orissa flood in the year 1999. He has given her support in her sporting career and is currently her coach, manager and mentor for the game. Her mother is an alumnus of St. Xavier's College, Mumbai. She has an elder sister.

== Career beginnings ==
She started playing snooker in 2005 at the age of 15. It was at the officer's mess at the College of Military Engineering in Pune, where her father was serving in the Indian Army, that she picked up the cue. She potted the first ball she aimed at. She was then studying in the X Std at the Army Public School, Pune. She would look for every opportunity to play and coaxed her father to take her. She started participating in the Annual tournament in Billiards and Snooker for the army officers at CME and won both the Billiards and Snooker Championships in the year 2006. She then took part in a Pune Open Snooker tournament at PYC Hindu Gymkhana in which she won the opening frame of her very first competitive match by potting the last black against her older and more experienced male player. Arantxa plays both snooker and billiards at the international level.

== Coaching ==
She had her basic coaching under the late Shri Satish Amarnath; a renowned national and international billiards and snooker player. Her compact stance, smooth cue delivery and sharp potting skills were developed under him. She had a short stint with Thai snooker player Phisit Chandsri, a 3-time IBSF World Snooker Masters Champion. He improved her break building ability and game strategy. At present, she is coached and mentored by her father.

== Education ==
Arantxa has done her schooling at Army Public School, Pune. She holds a Bachelor of Engineering degree in information technology from St. Francis Institute of Technology, University of Mumbai. She then went on to acquire an MBA in finance and international business from the Symbiosis Institute of Management Studies under Symbiosis International University, Pune.

== Sporting achievements ==
Sanchis has been a world and national champion in billiards.

In addition, she was a quarter-finalist at the below events:
IBSF World 6 Red Snooker Championships:

- Sharm el-Sheikh, Egypt (2017/2016/2014)
- Karachi, Pakistan (2015)

IBSF World Snooker Championship:

- Doha, Qatar (2017)

She has represented India at multiple world championships:
WPBSA Professional World Billiards Championship:

- Leeds, UK (Oct 2012)

IBSF World Snooker Championship:

- Sofia, Bulgaria (Nov 2012)
- Daugavpils, Latvia (Nov 2013)
- Bangalore, India (Dec 2014)
- Doha, Qatar (Nov 2016)

She represented Deccan Gymkhana, New Poona Club and Royal Western India Turf Club (RWITC) for various tournaments in Pune. She has also represented MCF Club and Catholic Gymkhana at the Mumbai Billiards & Snooker Leagues.

Sanchis' achievements at All India open tournaments include:

- CCI Open Snooker 2019 – Top 32 (Amongst men)
- Matunga Gymkhana 6 Red Open Snooker 2018 – Top 16 (Amongst men)
- ECC 6 Red Open Snooker 2018 – Top 32 (Amongst men)
- Matunga Gymkhana 6 Red Open Snooker 2016 – Quarterfinalist (Amongst men)
- Snooker Premier League 2016 - Runner-up (Team - Royal Strikers)

== Academic achievements ==
Sanchis achieved a Distinction during her Engineering from St. Francis Institute of Technology, Mumbai. She was declared the Best Student of the institute.

She also topped her MBA in Finance from Symbiosis Institute of Management Studies, Pune. Here, too, she was declared the Best Student of the institute.

In the year 2013, she was awarded the Chancellor's Gold Medal of Symbiosis International University for all-round excellence in MBA among 5,000 students across 10 institutes in India. She won as many as 10 awards during her two years of the MBA Course. She was awarded the Sports scholarship for two years in a row by the university.

== Awards and recognition ==
Sports:

- Shiv Chhatrapati Award for the year 2013–2014 by Maharashtra Government
- Best Sportsperson Award for the year 2012–2013 by Symbiosis International University
- Awarded the Phoenix Leading Lady Award 2020 for Personal Excellence (Sports)
- Most promising player at the Turf Club Open 2008
- Featured in the 100 Women Special by BBC.
- She was felicitated at the RWITC Pune Derby 2015 for her performance in Billiards and Snooker.
