= Mink Nutcharut =

Thai snooker player

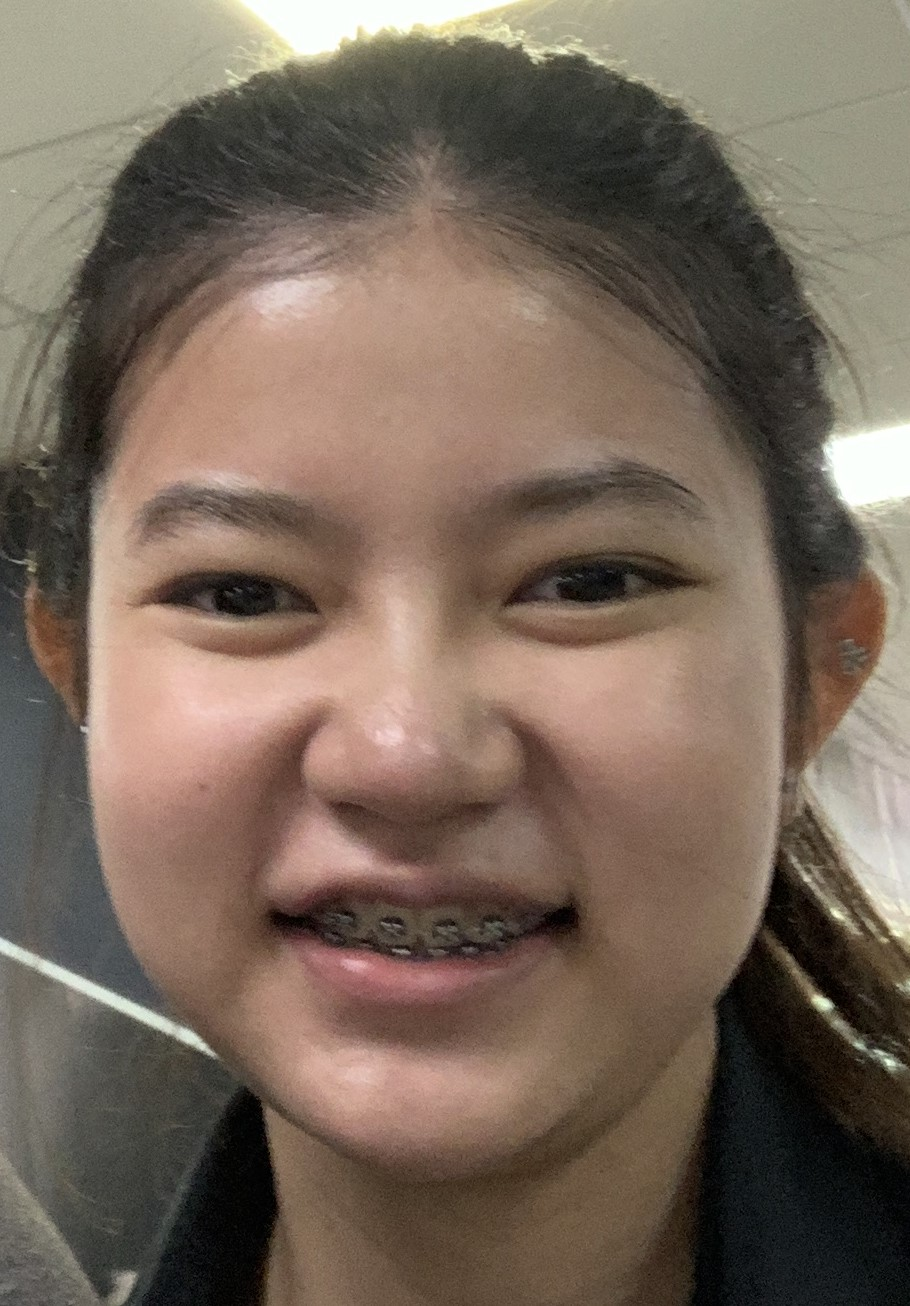
- Nutcharut in 2024

Personal information
- Born: 7 November 1999 (age 26) Saraburi, Thailand

Sport
- Country: Thailand
- Sport: Snooker
- Professional: 2022–2026
- Highest ranking: World Snooker Tour: 95 (June 2023); World Women's Snooker: 1
Medal record
Women's snooker
Representing Thailand
Asian Indoor and Martial Arts Games
Gold medal – first place	2017 Ashgabat	6-red snooker singles
Southeast Asian Games
Gold medal – first place	2025 Thailand	Snooker singles
Gold medal – first place	2025 Thailand	Snooker team
Silver medal – second place	2025 Thailand	6-red snooker singles

Nutcharut Wongharuthai (Thai: ณัชชารัตน์ วงศ์หฤทัย, RTGS: natcharat wongharuethai; born 7 November 1999), better known as Mink Nutcharut, is a Thai snooker player who competes on the World Women's Snooker Tour and formerly on the professional World Snooker Tour. She is the only woman known to have made a maximum break, having achieved the feat during a practice match in March 2019. She is, as of June 2025, number one in the world women's snooker rankings.

Nutcharut was World Women's Under-21 Champion in 2018, was runner-up to Reanne Evans in the 2019 World Women's Snooker Championship, and won the first of her seven ranking titles at the 2019 Australian Women's Open. She won the 2022 World Women's Snooker Championship, defeating Wendy Jans 6–5 on the final black to become the tournament's first Thai winner. She lost the 2024 final in the deciding frame against Bai Yulu.

As world women's champion, Nutcharut earned a two-year card to compete on the professional tour, beginning in the 2022–23 snooker season. She and Neil Robertson won the 2022 World Mixed Doubles championship, defeating Mark Selby and Rebecca Kenna in the final. As the top-ranked player in World Women's snooker at the end of 2023–24, Nutcharut gained a new tour card for the two years starting with the 2024–25 snooker season.

== Early life ==
Nutcharut Wongharuthai was born on 7 November 1999, in Saraburi, Thailand, and grew up there. She is known as "Mink", and explained in a 2019 interview with Matt Huart for World Women's Snooker that "in Thailand we call each and everyone by their nickname because our traditional Thai names are too long and we don't have any Christian name like Western people. So we use nicknames instead."

Nutcharut's mother was a cashier in a snooker club, and Nutcharut herself started playing at the age of 10, to occupy her time after school while waiting for her mother to finish work. She was encouraged to play by the club's owner Atthasit Mahitthi, who was a leading player in Thailand, and coached her. Having failed to get into college, Nutcharut took up snooker as a career. She moved to Bangkok, where she practised for eight hours a day at the Hi-End Snooker Club, which sponsors and supports her.

== Women's snooker ==
Nutcharut reached the final of the 2015 IBSF World Under-21 Snooker Championship for women, but lost 2–5 to Baipat Siripaporn. She won in 2016, aged 16, defeating Siripaporn 5–4 in the final. and retained the title at the next two annual tournaments. At the 2017 Asian Indoor and Martial Arts Games 6-red snooker, Nutcharut took the gold medal with a 4–0 victory against Waratthanun Sukritthanes.

At her first tournament in the UK, the 2018 British Open, Nutcharut defeated the reigning world champion Ng On-yee on the way to her first World Women's Snooker ranking final, in which she lost 0–4 to Reanne Evans. Two months later, she won the 2018 World Women's Snooker Under-21 Championship without losing a frame, including a 3–0 victory over Emma Parker in the final.

In March 2019 she made a 147 break during a practice session, which was the first and only known maximum break achieved by a female player. She defeated defending champion Ng in the quarter-final during her run to the 2019 World Women's Snooker Championship final, where she lost to 12-time champion Evans.

Nutcharut was one of four women to be selected for the Women's Tour Championship held at the Crucible Theatre, Sheffield in August 2019. It was the first time since 2003 that women would play at the venue which has an iconic status in snooker as the location for the World Snooker Championship annually from 1977. She played Evans in the semi-finals, and after the pair had each won one frame, the match was settled on a respotted black rather than a third frame, due to time constraints. Evans won by potting the ball with a treble. The following month, Nutcharut won the 2019 International Billiards and Snooker Federation World Women's 6 Reds Championship, beating Amee Kamani 4–2 in the final.

At the Australian Open in 2019, Nutcharut and Ng were the only players to complete their qualifying groups without losing a frame. Nutcharut then registered wins over Kimberly Cullen 3–0, Carlie Tait 3–0 and Jaique Ip 4–0 to reach the final against Ng. Nutcharut won the final 4–2, gaining her first ranking tournament win.

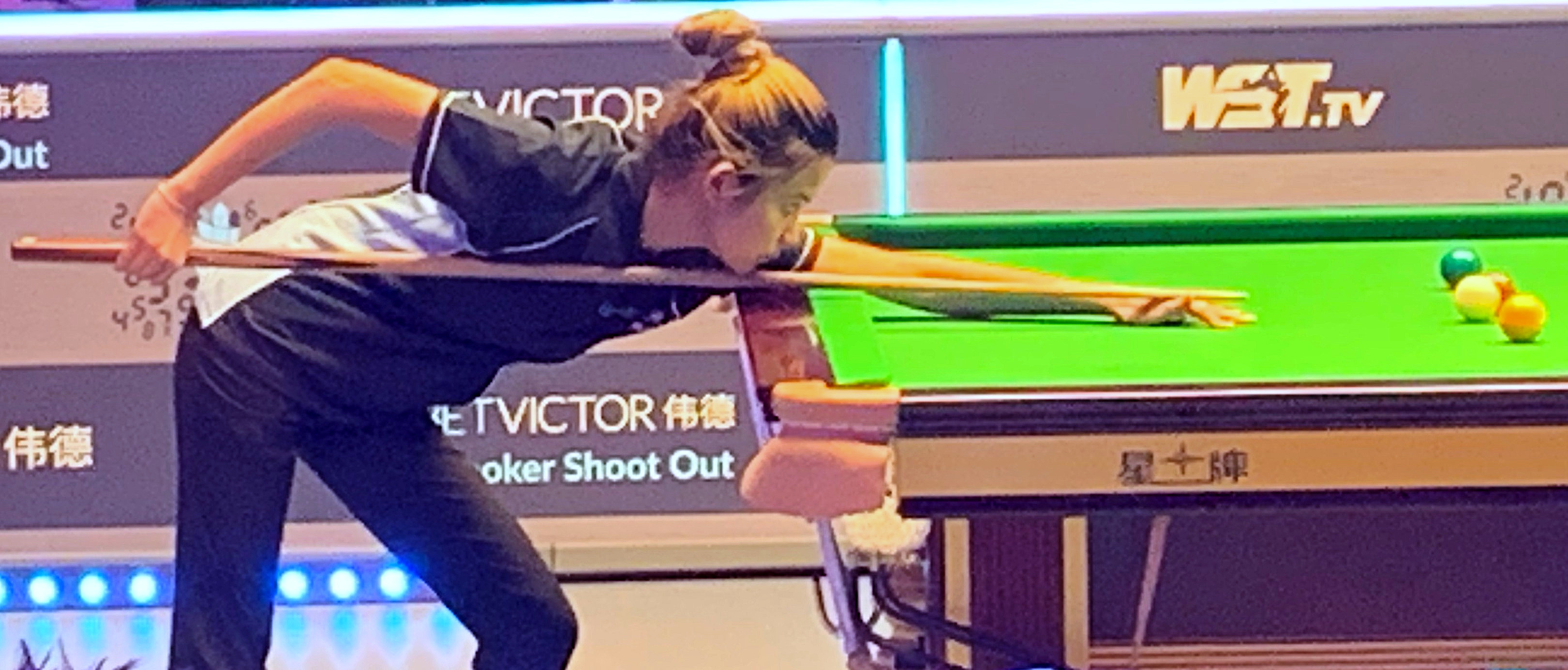
Nutcharut at the 2020 Snooker Shoot Out

From February 2020 to January 2022, Nutcharut did not compete on the World Women's Snooker circuit due to the COVID-19 pandemic. At her first tournament back, she won the 2022 British Open with a 4–3 win against Evans. In March 2020, she retained the IBSF World Women's 6 Reds Championship by defeating Diana Stateczny 5–3.

At the 2022 World Women's Snooker Championship, Nutcharut faced three-time champion Ng in the quarter-finals. Although Nutcharut took a 3–0 lead, Ng came back to force a deciding frame, but Nutcharut won the match 4–3 on the final black. She defeated Rebecca Kenna 5–1 in the semi-finals before facing Wendy Jans in the final. Although Nutcharut took a 2–1 lead, Jans won four of the next five to lead 5–3. Nutcharut then won the next two to force a deciding frame, in which the title was determined on the final black ball. Jans missed the black into the yellow pocket, leaving it over the middle, allowing Nutcharut to clinch her first women's world title. Nutcharut's victory gave her a two-year professional tour card, allowing her to join Evans and Ng on the main World Snooker Tour the following season. Evans commented that she was not surprised that Nutcharut had won the tournament, commenting that "She's got a good game, a never say die attitude. She has a bright future ahead of her". In the wake of her victory, Nutcharut was invited to meet Prime Minister Prayut Chan-o-cha, who told her that "You created a good story for Thais during this difficult time." Her next ranking title win was the 2022 Women's Masters, which saw her overcome Ng 4–0. At the following ranking event, she defeated Jans 4–1 to take the 2023 Belgian Women's Open title.

In 2023–24, Nutcharut won two of the season's eight ranking tournaments, and was runner-up at three other ranking tournaments. She defeated Ng 4‍–‍2 in the final of the US Open, after which she regained top place in the rankings. Later in the season, she defeated the same opponent by the same score to claim the Belgian Open, for her first successful defence of a ranking title and her seventh ranking title overall. She lost 3‍–‍4 to Ng in the final of the Albanian Open, after having recovered from 0‍–‍3 to 3‍–‍3.

Bai Yulu defeated Nutcharut 6‍–‍5 in the final of the 2024 World Women's Snooker Championship, winning the deciding frame on the last pink ball. Nutcharut had not lost a frame in that year's tournament before the final. In the fourth final of the season in which she faced Ng, the British Open, Nutcharut lost 1‍–‍4. Nutcharut finished the season in top place in the rankings.

Having held the number one ranking in World Women's Snooker from February to May 2023, Nutcharut was replaced by Evans before regaining the top position in August of that year, and retained it as of June 2025. She won the 2024 Australian Women's Open on the final black ball of the deciding frame against Ng. In October 2024 she became a Commander (Third Class) of the Order of the Direkgunabhorn.

== World Snooker Tour ==
Nutcharut entered Q School, a qualifying competition for the main World Snooker Tour, several times. At a 2022 event, she defeated five male players including two former professionals.

At the first ranking event of the 2022–23 snooker season, the 2022 Championship League (ranking), Nutcharut was drawn in Group 32 alongside Xiao Guodong, Scott Donaldson and Rod Lawler. The tournament director Paul Collier agreed to her request to be called Mink Nutcharut. The players faced each other in a round-robin of four-frame matches. She won the first frame against Xiao, but lost 1–3. From 2–1 against Donaldson, the match ended in a 2–2 draw after he made a 52 clearance to win the frame on the final black ball. With a 1–3 loss to Lawler, her results meant that she finished fourth in the group, but journalist David Hendon wrote that "over the course of the day the potential of the 22-year-old from Thailand was clear." She was eliminated in her first match in the next two ranking tournament qualifying competitions: 1–5 by Mitchell Mann at the 2022 European Masters and 2–4 by Chen Zifan at the tour's 2022 British Open. Nutcharut's first win as a professional was a 4–2 defeat of Mann, who was ranked 71st, during the qualifying competition for the season's fourth ranking event, the 2022 Northern Ireland Open. She did not win any other singles matches on the main tour in her debut season.

At the 2022 World Mixed Doubles championship, the first staging of the tournament since 1991, Nutcharut and Neil Robertson defeated Kenna and Mark Selby 4–2 in the final. They both received £30,000 for winning the title, the biggest prize of her career to date. In the 2023 World Snooker Championship qualifying competition, she lost 7–10 to Dechawat Poomjaeng, but made her first century break in professional competition, becoming the first woman since Kelly Fisher in 2002 to make a century in a World Championship match.

In the 2023–24 snooker season, she drew two of her three 2023 Championship League (ranking) matches but did not progress. Her only main tour win of the season was in the 2023 UK Championship qualifying, when she defeated Adam Duffy 6‍–‍3, but then lost to Michael White in a deciding frame in the second round. In the qualifying event for the 2024 World Snooker Championship, she was level with Duffy at 4‍–‍4, but Duffy went on to win 10‍–‍5.

As the top-ranked player in World Women's snooker at the end of 2023–24, Nutcharut gained a new tour card for the two years starting with the 2024–25 snooker season. On 12 September 2024, she defeated Evans 4–2 in the first round at the English Open in the first match between two female players on the professional World Snooker Tour.

In a July 2024 interview, Nutcharut commented that women were able to compete with men at snooker as it is not a contact sport and added, "Sure, there are some elements of strength involved – such as the force behind a strike – but I think that with practice, it's very possible for women to dominate over men in snooker, and that's exciting!"

== Performance and rankings timeline ==
=== World Snooker Tour ===
Tournament	2018/ 19	2019/ 20	2021/ 22	2022/ 23	2023/ 24	2024/ 25	2025/ 26
Ranking (Note: It shows the ranking at the beginning of the season)	(Note: She was an amateur)			(Note: New players on the Main Tour don't have a ranking)	95	(Note: Players qualified through Women's Tour started the season without ranking points)	90
Ranking tournaments
Championship League	Non-Ranking		A	RR	RR	RR	RR
Saudi Arabia Masters	Tournament Not Held					2R	1R
Wuhan Open	Tournament Not Held				LQ	LQ	LQ
English Open	A	A	A	LQ	LQ	LQ	LQ
British Open	Not Held		A	LQ	LQ	LQ	LQ
Xi'an Grand Prix	Tournament Not Held					LQ	LQ
Northern Ireland Open	A	A	A	1R	LQ	LQ	LQ
International Championship	A	A	Not Held		LQ	LQ	LQ
UK Championship	A	A	A	LQ	LQ	LQ	LQ
Shoot Out	A	1R	A	1R	1R	1R	A
Scottish Open	A	A	A	LQ	LQ	LQ	LQ
German Masters	A	A	A	LQ	LQ	LQ	LQ
World Grand Prix	DNQ	DNQ	DNQ	DNQ	DNQ	DNQ	DNQ
Players Championship	DNQ	DNQ	DNQ	DNQ	DNQ	DNQ	DNQ
Welsh Open	A	A	A	LQ	LQ	LQ	LQ
World Open	A	A	Not Held		LQ	LQ	LQ
Tour Championship	DNQ	DNQ	DNQ	DNQ	DNQ	DNQ	DNQ
World Championship	A	A	LQ	LQ	LQ	LQ	LQ
Non-ranking tournaments
Champion of Champions	A	A	A	1R	A	A	A
Former ranking tournaments
Paul Hunter Classic	LQ	NR	Tournament Not Held				
Gibraltar Open	A	WD	A	Tournament Not Held			
WST Classic	Not Held			1R	Not Held		
European Masters	A	A	A	LQ	LQ	Not Held	
Former non-ranking tournaments
Six-red World Championship	RR	A	NH	RR	Not Held		

Performance Table Legend
LQ	lost in the qualifying draw	#R	lost in the early rounds of the tournament (WR = Wildcard round, RR = Round robin)	QF	lost in the quarter-finals
SF	lost in the semi-finals	F	lost in the final	W	won the tournament
DNQ	did not qualify for the tournament	A	did not participate in the tournament	WD	withdrew from the tournament

NH / Not Held	means an event was not held.
NR / Non-Ranking Event	means an event is/was no longer a ranking event.
R / Ranking Event	means an event is/was a ranking event.

=== World Women's Snooker ===
Current tournaments
Tournament	2016/ 17	2017/ 18	2018/ 19	2019/ 20	2021/ 22	2022/ 23	2023/ 24	2024/ 25	2025/ 26
UK Championship	A	A	SF	A	A	SF	QF	SF	SF
US Open	Tournament Not Held					A	W	QF	
Australian Open	Not Held		SF	W	NH	A	SF	W	SF
Masters	A	A	A	QF	A	W	A	F	
WSF Women's Championship	Not Held							W	
Belgian Open	Not Held		SF	SF	NH	W	W	F	
World Championship	RR	QF	F	NH	W	SF	F	F	SF
British Open	NH	F	Not Held		W	2R	F	F	

Former tournaments
Tournament	2016/ 17	2017/ 18	2018/ 19	2019/ 20	2021/ 22	2022/ 23	2023/ 24	2024/ 25
European Masters	Not Held		F	Tournament Not Held				
10-Red World Championship	NH	A	QF	QF	Not Held			
6-Red World Championship	NH	A	1R	F	Not Held			
Tour Championship	Not Held			SF	Not Held			
Winchester Open	Tournament Not Held				F	Not Held		
Scottish Open	Tournament Not Held					F	Not Held	
Asia-Pacific Championship	Tournament Not Held					QF	Not Held	
Albanian Open	Tournament Not Held						F	NH

Performance Table Legend
LQ	lost in the qualifying draw	#R	lost in the early rounds of the tournament (WR = Wildcard round, RR = Round robin)	QF	lost in the quarter-finals
SF	lost in the semi-finals	F	lost in the final	W	won the tournament
DNQ	did not qualify for the tournament	A	did not participate in the tournament	WD	withdrew from the tournament

NH / Not Held	means an event was not held.
NR / Non-Ranking Event	means an event is/was no longer a ranking event.
R / Ranking Event	means an event is/was a ranking event.

== Career finals ==
=== Women's finals ===
Legend
†World Women's Snooker ranking tournament
‡IBSF World Championship

Outcome	No.	Year	Championship	Opponent	Score	Ref.
Runner-up	1.	2015	IBSF World Under-21 Snooker Championship	Baipat Siripaporn (THA)	2–5	
Winner	1.	2016	IBSF World Under-21 Snooker Championship	Baipat Siripaporn (THA)	5–4	
Winner	2.	2017	Asian Indoor and Martial Arts Games: 6-red snooker	Waratthanun Sukritthanes (THA)	4–0	
Winner	3.	2017	IBSF World Under-21 Snooker Championship	Xia Yuying (CHN)	5–3	
Winner	4.	2018	IBSF World Under-21 Snooker Championship	Bai Yulu (CHN)	4–2	
Runner-up	2.	2018	British Open†	Reanne Evans (ENG)	0–4	
Winner	5.	2018	World Women's Snooker Under-21 Championship	Emma Parker (ENG)	3–0	
Winner	6.	2018	UK Women's Championship (Under-21s)	Shannon Metcalf (ENG)	2–1	
Runner-up	3.	2018	European Women's Masters†	Reanne Evans (ENG)	1–4	
Runner-up	4.	2018	European Women's Masters (Under-21s)	Emma Parker (ENG)	0–2	
Runner-up	5.	2019	Belgian Women's Open (Under-21s)	Steph Daughtery (ENG)	0–2	
Runner-up	6.	2019	World Women's Snooker Under-21 Championship	Ploychompoo Laokiatphong (THA)	1–3	
Runner-up	7.	2019	World Women's Snooker 6-Red Championship	Reanne Evans (ENG)	1–4	
Runner-up	8.	2019	World Women's Snooker Championship†	Reanne Evans (ENG)	3–6	
Runner-up	9.	2019	IBSF World Snooker Championship‡	Ng On-yee (HKG)	2–5	
Winner	7.	2019	IBSF World Women's 6 Reds Championship	Amee Kamani (IND)	4–2	
Winner	8.	2019	Australian Women's Open Championship†	Ng On-yee (HKG)	4–2	
Winner	9.	2020	IBSF World Women's 6 Reds Championship	Diana Stateczny (GER)	5–3	
Winner	10.	2022	British Open†	Reanne Evans (ENG)	4–3	
Winner	11.	2022	World Women's Snooker Championship†	Wendy Jans (BEL)	6–5	
Runner-up	10.	2022	IBSF World Snooker Championship‡	Wendy Jans (BEL)	1–4	
Runner-up	11.	2022	Scottish Women's Open†	Reanne Evans (ENG)	2–4	
Winner	12.	2022	Women's Masters†	Ng On-yee (HKG)	4–0	
Winner	13.	2023	Belgian Women's Open†	Wendy Jans (BEL)	4–1	
Winner	14.	2023	US Women's Open†	Ng On-yee (HKG)	4–2	
Winner	15.	2024	Belgian Women's Open†	Ng On-yee (HKG)	4–2	
Runner-up	12.	2024	Albanian Women's Open†	Ng On-yee (HKG)	3–4	
Runner-up	13.	2024	World Women's Snooker Championship†	Bai Yulu (CHN)	5–6	
Winner	16.	2024	Australian Women's Open†	Ng On-yee (HKG)	4–3	
Runner-up	14.	2024	Women's Masters†	Reanne Evans (ENG)	3–4	
Winner	17.	2025	World Snooker Federation Women's Championship†	Bai Yulu (CHN)	4–3	
Runner-up	15.	2025	Belgian Women's Open†	Reanne Evans (ENG)	3–4	
Runner-up	16.	2025	British Open†	Ng On-yee (HKG)	3–4	

=== Team finals ===
Outcome	No.	Year	Championship	Team/partner	Opponent in the final	Score	Ref.
Winner	1.	2022	World Mixed Doubles	Neil Robertson (AUS)	Mark Selby (ENG); Rebecca Kenna (ENG)	4–2	
