= Women's Amateur Snooker Championship =

Snooker tournament established in 1932

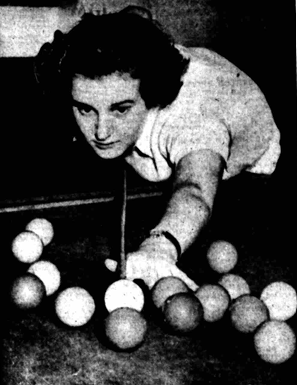
Maureen Baynton (pictured in 1953) won eight titles between 1954 and 1968.

The Women's Amateur Snooker Championship was a tournament held annually in the United Kingdom most years from 1932 to 1985 by the Women's Billiards Association (WBA), which was later renamed as the Women's Billiards and Snooker Association (WBSA).

In 1932 a snooker tournament for amateur women players was organised by the WBA, which had been established in 1931. Six players participated in the main tournament at Burroughes Hall, London. Margaret Quinn was the youngest, aged 13 and 11 months, and won the title. Following this, the 1932 Annual General Meeting of the WBA resolved "That girls under 16 are only eligible for such WBA events as are run specially for young people." It was further resolved, however, that Quinn would be allowed to enter to defend her title for as long as she held it. Quinn retained the title in 1933 but lost it in 1934 when, due to confusion about the date of her first match, she did not attend. As of 1947, the annual winner held the Burwat Trophy, the runner-up held the A.D.C. Cup, and the player who compiled the highest break held the Grace Wise-Parker Bowl.

The WBA was in decline in the late 1960s and early 1970s, but was revived under the leadership of Wally West, who was appointed as secretary in 1978 and obtained sponsorship for tournaments including the 1980 and 1981 Women's World Open championships. The Association was renamed as the Women's Billiards and Snooker Association (WBSA). After the 1981 Women's World Open, a number of players became dissatisfied with West's management of the WBSA and the World Ladies Billiards and Snooker Association (WLBSA) was founded as a rival on 31 July 1981.

The WBSA continued to be the body officially recognised by the Billiards and Snooker Control Council (B&SCC). West resigned from the WBSA in September 1981, but then withdrew his resignation. The WBSA at that time had no tournaments scheduled. By August 1982, the WLBSA had organised a schedule of ten tournaments for the coming season, and, according to an article in Snooker Scene magazine, was "supported ... by virtually all serious women players." A month later, West was no longer involved with the WBSA and the WBSA's representative on the B&SCC Council, Vera Selby, offered to resign from the Council and supported a merger between the WBSA and the WLBSA, using the latter name. In the meantime, the WLBSA removed its restriction preventing WBSA members from joining, and offered WBSA members free membership of the WLBSA until the end of 1982. The last edition of the Women's Amateur Snooker Championship was in 1980, when Sue Foster defeated Mandy Fisher 2–1 in the final.

Maureen Baynton won the Women's Amateur Snooker Championship title a record eight times, between 1954 and 1968. Snooker historian Clive Everton wrote that Baynton would "have assuredly won more" had she not retired from competition for several years. The largest gap between successive wins by an individual player was when 1939 winner Agnes Davies regained the title in 1978. The most wins in consecutive years by a player was four, by Selby from 1972 to 1975.

== Finals ==
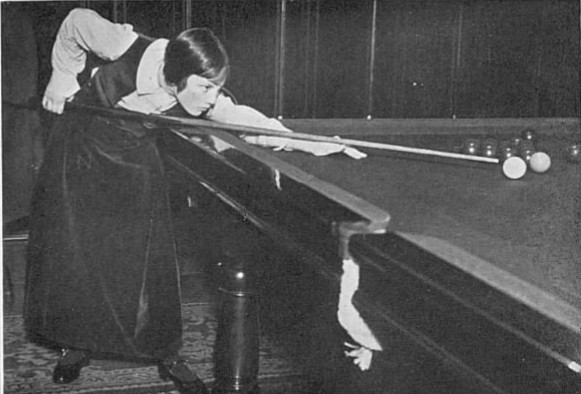
Margaret Quinn at the inaugural championship in 1932

Women's Amateur Snooker Championship finals
Year	Winner	Runner-up	Final score	Venue	Ref.
1932	Margaret Quinn (ENG)	Irene Murkett (ENG)	3–0	Burroughes Hall, London	(Note: This edition is omitted from the lists in the 1947 WBA Handbook and other sources)
1933	Margaret Quinn (ENG)	Miss Ballentine (ENG)	4–1	Burroughes Hall, London	
1934	Ella Morris (WAL)	Molly Van Norden (ENG)	4–0	Burroughes Hall, London	
1935	Molly Hill (ENG)	Helen McDougall (ENG)	4–1	Burroughes Hall, London	
1936	Vera Seals (ENG)	Margaret Quinn (ENG)	4–1	Kensington Billiard Club, London	
1937	Evelyn Morland-Smith (ENG)	Ella Morris (WAL)	3–2	Burroughes Hall, London	
1938	Ella Morris (WAL)	Molly Hill (ENG)	4–1	Kensington Billiard Club, London	
1939	Agnes Morris (WAL)	Victoria McDougall (ENG)	4–0	Kensington Billiard Club, London	
1940–46	Not held				
1947	Mabel Knight (ENG)	Aileen Bowmer (ENG)	4–3	Empire Billiards Club, London	
1948	Joan Adcock (ENG)	E. M. Peters (ENG)	5–2	Leicester Square Hall, London	
1949	Rosemary Davies (ENG)	Joan Adcock (ENG)	4–1	Burroughes Hall, London	
1950	Pat Holden (ENG)	Evelyn Morland-Smith (ENG)	4–1	Burroughes Hall, London	
1951	Rosemary Davies (ENG)	Sadie Isaacs (ENG)	4–1	Burroughes Hall, London	
1952	Rosemary Davies (ENG)	Pat Holden (ENG)	4–1	Burroughes Hall, London	
1953	Rita Holmes (ENG)	Maureen Barrett (ENG)	4–3	Burroughes Hall, London	
1954	Maureen Barrett (ENG)	Rita Holmes (ENG)	4–0	Burroughes Hall, London	
1955	Maureen Barrett (ENG)	Rita Holmes (ENG)	4–2	Burroughes Hall, London	
1956	Maureen Barrett (ENG)	Rita Holmes (ENG)	4–0	Burroughes Hall, London	
1957	Rita Holmes (ENG)	Pat Ayre (ENG)	4–2	Burroughes Hall, London	
1958	Not held				
1959	Rita Holmes (ENG)	Muriel Hazeldene (ENG) (Note: The spellings Hazeldine, e.g. in the Birmingham Evening Mail in 1960, and Hezeldene, e.g. in the Birmingham Evening Mail in 1975 are also found in some sources for this player.)	4–1	Burroughes Hall, London	
1960	Dorothy Thompson (ENG)	K.V.M. Bint (ENG)	4–3	Burroughes Hall, London	
1961	Maureen Barrett (ENG)	Thea March (ENG)	4–0	Burroughes Hall, London	
1962	Maureen Baynton (née Barrett) (ENG)	Rita Holmes (ENG)	4–1	Burroughes Hall, London	
1963	Rita Holmes (ENG)	Jean Halford (ENG)	4–2	Burroughes Hall, London	
1964	Maureen Baynton (née Barrett) (ENG)	Ray Craven (ENG)	4–2	Burroughes Hall, London	
1965	S. Jeffries (ENG)	S. Bartley (ENG)	4–0	Burroughes Hall, London	
1966	Maureen Baynton (née Barrett) (ENG)	Thea March (ENG)	4–2	Burroughes Hall, London	
1967	Helen Futo (ENG)	P. Saddington (ENG)	4–1	Burroughes Hall, London	
1968	Maureen Baynton (née Barrett) (ENG)	Ray Craven (ENG)	4–1	Windmill Snooker Club, London	
1969	Ray Craven (ENG)	Muriel Hazeldene (ENG)	4–3	Windmill Snooker Club, London	
1970	Muriel Hazeldene (ENG)	Ray Craven (ENG)	4–2	London	
1971	Muriel Hazeldene (ENG)	Vera Selby (ENG)	4–1	Windmill Snooker Club, London	
1972	Vera Selby (ENG)	Ray Craven (ENG)	4–0	London	
1973	Vera Selby (ENG)	Kay Godwin (ENG)	4–0	London	
1974	Vera Selby (ENG)	Muriel Hazeldene (ENG)	4–1	Windmill Snooker Club, London	
1975	Vera Selby (ENG)	Ann Johnson (ENG)	4–2	Windmill Snooker Club, London	
1976	Ann Johnson (ENG)	Vera Selby (ENG)	4-1	Windmill Snooker Club, London	
1977	Ann Johnson (ENG)	Vera Selby (ENG)	4–2	London	
1978	Agnes Davies (née Morris) (WAL)	Ann Johnson (ENG)	4–1	Wandsworth Billiards Club, London	
1979	Vera Selby (ENG)	Ann Johnson (ENG)	3–1	Craneswater Club, Portsmouth	
1980	Sue Foster (ENG)	Mandy Fisher (ENG)	2–1	Willie Thorne Snooker Centre, Leicester	

== See also ==
- World Women's Billiards Championship
