= 2016 World Ladies Snooker Championship =

Women's snooker event, held April 2016

Tournament information
- Dates: 2–5 April 2016
- Venue: Northern Snooker Centre
- City: Leeds
- Country: England
- Organisation: World Ladies Billiards and Snooker
- Format: Round Robin, Single elimination
- Winner's share: £1,200
- Highest break: Ng On-yee (72)

Final
- Champion: Reanne Evans (ENG)
- Runner-up: Ng On-yee (HKG)
- Score: 6–4

The 2016 World Ladies Snooker Championship was a women's snooker tournament that took place at the Northern Snooker Centre in Leeds, England, from 2 to 5 April 2016. The event was the 2016 edition of the World Women's Snooker Championship first held in 1976.

The event was won by Reanne Evans, who defeated defending champion Ng On-yee 6–4 in the final.

== Background ==
The event was hosted at the Northern Snooker Centre, Leeds. Qualifying featured five groups of five or six players each with eight players qualifying for the main tournament. Those players met eight seeded players in the last-16 knockout round. After the group stage, the players not reaching the main knockout tournament competed in a parallel "Plate" tournament. Matches in the group stage were best-of-three-frames.

The first knockout round was best-of-five-frames; the quarter-finals and semi-finals best-of-seven, and the final was played as a best-of-11 match.

Forty-one players from thirteen countries participated in the tournament, as listed in the table below. Numbers in brackets show the eight seeded players. Although Ng On-yee was the defending champion, Reanne Evans was the highest seed.

Players Participating, by Country
Country	Players	Names
Australia	2	Kathy Howden, Jessica Woods
Belarus	1	Yana Shut
Brazil	1	Laura Alves
England	17	Jodie Allen, Aimee Benn, Elizabeth Black, Emma Bonney (8), Michelle Brown, Maria Catalano (4), Stephanie Daughtery, Lily Dobson, Claire Edginton, Reanne Evans (1), Danielle Findlay, Sharon Kaur, Rebecca Kenna, Shannon Metcalf, Suzie Opacic, Jenny Poulter (6), Vicky Shirley
Germany	2	Diana Schuler, Diana Stateczny
Hong Kong	3	Jaique Ip (3), Katrina Wan (7), Ng On-yee (2)
India	2	Chitra Magimairaj, Varshaa Sanjeev
(Republic of Ireland) Ireland	8	Sandra Bryan, Lauren Carley, Christine Carr, Cathy Dunne, Lorraine Fivey, Ann McMahon, Annette Newman, Ronda Sheldreck
Latvia	1	Tatjana Vasiljeva (5)
Romania	1	Corina Maracine
South Korea	1	Jeong Min Park
Switzerland	1	Claudia Weber
Wales	1	Laura Evans

=== Prize money ===
The winner of the event won a total of £1,200.

- Winner: £1,200
- Runner-up: £600
- Losing semi-finalists: £300
- Losing quarter-finalists: £150
- Last 16 losers: £80
- Highest Break (72, Ng On-yee) £100

== Summary ==
=== Group stage ===
There were three groups of six players and three groups of five players. The top eight seeds were placed into the last-16 round of the knockout phase and were not required to play in the qualifying groups. Progression from the groups was determined by the following criteria: Matches won; Head to head; frames won; Highest break; and finally by ranking position. The event was split after the group stage, with players not reaching the main knockout tournament competing in a parallel tournament called the plate competition.

The only player to complete their qualifying matches without losing a frame was Chitra Magimairaj. Two players qualified whilst only losing one frame each: Jessica Woods and Kathy Howden. Lauren Carley, Ronda Sheldreck, and Sandra Bryan all failed to win any frames.

=== Knockout ===
Three of the eight seeds lost in the last-16: Maria Catalano, Jaique Ip (seeded 3rd), Maria Catalano (4th) and Jenny Poulter (6th). Ng On-yee progressed to the final without losing a frame, beating Laura Evans 3–0, Katrina Wan 4–0 and Rebecca Kenna 4–0. Reanne Evans whitewashed Diana Schuler 3–0 then beat 2015 runner-up Emma Bonney 4–2 and Tatjana Vasiljeva 4–1. Kenna was the only unseeded player to reach as far as the semi-finals before losing to On-yee.

=== Final ===
The final took place on 5 April 2016, and was contested by defending champion Ng On-yee and top seed Reanne Evans. Evans won the first frame, before Ng took the next three, making the highest break of the competition, 72, in the fourth frame. Evans then took the next two frames to level the match at 3–3. Ng regained the lead again at 4–3, before Evans won three in a row to win the match 6–4, including a break of 47 in frame ten.

The victory for Evan was her 11th world championship win in the previous 12 years.

Ng played Peter Lines in 2016 World Snooker Championship qualifying the Wednesday after the final, however, she lost 1–10.

== Breaks ==
There were only five breaks of over 50, by just three players. The highest break of the tournament was 72 by Ng On-yee, who also recorded a 52. Reanne Evans compiled a 68 and a 59. Michelle Brown made a 55.

== Results ==
=== Group stage matches ===
Players who qualified from the group are shown in bold and with a (Q) after their name in the final standings tables below.

**Group A**
	Score	
Ann McMahon (IRE)	1–2	Lorraine Fivey (IRE)
Yana Shut (BLR)	2–1	Lorraine Fivey (IRE)
Shannon Metcalf (ENG)	3–0	Jeong Min Park (KOR)
Lauren Carley (IRE)	0–3	Lorraine Fivey (IRE)
Shannon Metcalf (ENG)	1–2	Yana Shut (BLR)
Jeong Min Park (KOR)	3–0	Lauren Carley (IRE)
Shannon Metcalf (ENG)	3–0	Lauren Carley (IRE)
Ann McMahon (IRE)	3–0	Lauren Carley (IRE)
Jeong Min Park (KOR)	1–2	Ann McMahon (IRE)
Jeong Min Park (KOR)	0–3	Yana Shut (BLR)
Yana Shut (BLR)	3–0	Lauren Carley (IRE)
Shannon Metcalf (ENG)	3–0	Lorraine Fivey (IRE)
Shannon Metcalf (ENG)	1–2	Ann McMahon (IRE)
Jeong Min Park (KOR)	2–1	Lorraine Fivey (IRE)
Yana Shut (BLR)	3–0	Ann McMahon (IRE)

**Group A Final Standings**
Player	MP	MW	FW	FL	FA	Diff
(Belarus) **Yana Shut (Q)**	5	5	13	2	2.2	11
(Republic of Ireland) Ann McMahon	5	3	8	7	0.2	1
(England) Shannon Metcalf	5	3	11	4	1.4	7
(South Korea) Jeong Min Park	5	2	6	9	−0.6	−3
(Republic of Ireland) Lorraine Fivey	5	2	7	8	−0.2	−1
(Republic of Ireland) Lauren Carley	5	0	0	15	−3	−15
MP = Matches Played; MW = Matches Won; FW = Frames Won; FL = Frames Lost; FA = Frame Average (FW minus FL / MP); Diff = Frames Won minus Frames Lost

**Group B**
	Score	
Lily Dobson (ENG)	1–2	Laura Alves (BRA)
Diana Schuler (GER)	2–1	Michelle Brown (ENG)
Jessica Woods (AUS)	3–0	Annette Newman (IRE)
Laura Alves (BRA)	0–3	Michelle Brown (ENG)
Lily Dobson (ENG)	0–3	Annette Newman (IRE)
Diana Schuler (GER)	3–0	Lily Dobson (ENG)
Lily Dobson (ENG)	0–3	Michelle Brown (ENG)
Jessica Woods (AUS)	3–0	Laura Alves (BRA)
Diana Schuler (GER)	2–1	Annette Newman (IRE)
Jessica Woods (AUS)	3–0	Michelle Brown (ENG)
Diana Schuler (GER)	1–2	Jessica Woods (AUS)
Jessica Woods (AUS)	3–0	Lily Dobson (ENG)
Michelle Brown (ENG)	2–1	Annette Newman (IRE)
Diana Schuler (GER)	1–2	Laura Alves (BRA)
Laura Alves (BRA)	2–2	Annette Newman (IRE)

**Group B Final Standings**
Player	MP	MW	FW	FL	FA	Diff
(Australia) **Jessica Woods (Q)**	5	5	14	1	2.6	13
(Germany) **Diana Schuler (Q)**	5	4	11	4	1.4	7
(England) Michelle Brown	5	3	9	6	0.6	3
(Republic of Ireland) Annette Newman	5	2	7	8	−0.2	−1
(Brazil) Laura Alves	5	1	3	12	−1.8	−9
(England) Lily Dobson	5	0	1	14	−2.6	−13

**Group C**
	Score	
Aimee Benn (ENG)	0–3	Corina Maracine (ROM)
Danielle Findlay (ENG)	0–3	Chitra Magimairaj (IND)
Corina Maracine (ROM)	3–0	Christine Carr (IRE)
Danielle Findlay (ENG)	3–0	Christine Carr (IRE)
Aimee Benn (ENG)	0–3	Chitra Magimairaj (IND)
Aimee Benn (ENG)	3–0	Claire Edginton (ENG)
Danielle Findlay (ENG)	2–1	Claire Edginton (ENG)
Danielle Findlay (ENG)	2–1	Aimee Benn (ENG)
Chitra Magimairaj (IND)	3–0	Christine Carr (IRE)
Aimee Benn (ENG)	3–0	Christine Carr (IRE)
Claire Edginton (ENG)	1–2	Christine Carr (IRE)
Chitra Magimairaj (IND)	3–0	Corina Maracine (ROM)
Danielle Findlay (ENG)	2–1	Corina Maracine (ROM)
Claire Edginton (ENG)	0–3	Chitra Magimairaj (IND)
Claire Edginton (ENG)	1–2	Corina Maracine (ROM)

**Group C Final Standings**
Player	MP	MW	FW	FL	FA	Diff
(India) **Chitra Magimairaj (Q)**	5	5	15	0	3	15
(England) Danielle Findlay	5	4	9	6	0.6	3
(Romania) Corina Maracine	5	3	9	6	0.6	3
(England) Aimee Benn	5	2	7	8	−0.2	−1
(Republic of Ireland) Christine Carr	5	1	2	13	−2.2	−11
(England) Claire Edginton	5	0	3	12	−1.8	−9

**Group D**
	Score	
Kathy Howden (AUS)	3–0	Cathy Dunne (IRE)
Stephanie Daughtery (ENG)	0–3	Jodie Allen (ENG)
Stephanie Daughtery (ENG)	0–3	Kathy Howden (AUS)
Jodie Allen (ENG)	2–1	Cathy Dunne (IRE)
Stephanie Daughtery (ENG)	3–0	Elizabeth Black (ENG)
Elizabeth Black (ENG)	1–2	Cathy Dunne (IRE)
Elizabeth Black (ENG)	0–3	Kathy Howden (AUS)
Elizabeth Black (ENG)	0–3	Jodie Allen (ENG)
Stephanie Daughtery (ENG)	1–2	Cathy Dunne (IRE)
Kathy Howden (AUS)	2–1	Jodie Allen (ENG)

**Group D Final Standings**
Player	MP	MW	FW	FL	FA	Diff
(Australia) **Kathy Howden (Q)**	4	4	11	1	2.5	10
(England) Jodie Allen	4	3	9	3	1.5	6
(Republic of Ireland) Cathy Dunne	4	2	5	7	−0.5	−2
(England) Steph Daughtery	4	1	4	8	−1	−4
(England) Elizabeth Black	4	0	1	11	−2.5	−10

**Group E**
	Score	
Ronda Sheldreck (IRE)	0–3	Sharon Kaur (ENG)
Laura Evans (WAL)	3–0	Sharon Kaur (ENG)
Laura Evans (WAL)	3–0	Ronda Sheldreck (IRE)
Ronda Sheldreck (IRE)	1–2	Claudia Weber (SWI)
Ronda Sheldreck (IRE)	0–3	Claudia Weber (SWI)
Diana Stateczny (GER)	2–1	Claudia Weber (SWI)
Sharon Kaur (ENG)	0–3	Diana Stateczny (GER)
Laura Evans (WAL)	1–2	Diana Stateczny (GER)
Laura Evans (WAL)	3–0	Claudia Weber (SWI)
Ronda Sheldreck (IRE)	0–3	Diana Stateczny (GER)

**Group E Final Standings**
Player	MP	MW	FW	FL	FA	Diff
(Germany) **Diana Stateczny (Q)**	4	4	10	2	2	8
(Wales) **Laura Evans (Q)**	4	3	10	2	2	8
(Switzerland) Claudia Weber	4	2	6	6	0	0
(England) Sharon Kaur	4	1	4	8	−1	−4
(Republic of Ireland) Ronda Sheldreck	4	0	0	12	−3	−12

**Group F**
	Score	
Suzie Opacic (ENG)	1–2	Rebecca Kenna (ENG)
Rebecca Kenna (ENG)	3–0	Sandra Bryan (IRE)
Rebecca Kenna (ENG)	2–1	Vicky Shirley (ENG)
Vicky Shirley (ENG)	3–0	Sandra Bryan (IRE)
Suzie Opacic (ENG)	3–0	Sandra Bryan (IRE)
Rebecca Kenna (ENG)	3–0	Varshaa Sanjeev (IND)
Varshaa Sanjeev (IND)	2–1	Vicky Shirley (ENG)
Varshaa Sanjeev (IND)	3–0	Sandra Bryan (IRE)
Suzie Opacic (ENG)	1–2	Varshaa Sanjeev (IND)
Suzie Opacic (ENG)	2–1	Vicky Shirley (ENG)

**Group F Final Standings**
Player	MP	MW	FW	FL	FA	Diff
(England) **Rebecca Kenna (Q)**	4	4	10	2	2	8
(India) Varshaa Sanjeev	4	3	7	5	0.5	2
(England) Suzie Opacic	4	2	7	5	0.5	2
(England) Vicky Shirley	4	1	6	6	0	0
(Republic of Ireland) Sandra Bryan	4	0	0	12	−3	−12

=== Knockout stage ===
Seedings are shown in brackets. Players listed in bold indicate match winner.

Last 16; Best of 5 frames
(England) **Reanne Evans (1)**	**3**
(Germany) Diana Schuler	0
(England) **Emma Bonney (8)**	**3**
(India) Chitra Magimairaj	1
(Latvia) **Tatjana Vasiljeva (5)**	**3**
(Belarus) Yana Shut	2
(England) Maria Catalano (4)	1
(Germany) **Diana Stateczny**	**3**
(Hong Kong) Jaique Ip (3)	1
(England) **Rebecca Kenna**	**3**
(England) Jenny Poulter (6)	2
(Australia) **Kathy Howden**	**3**
(Hong Kong) **Katrina Wan (7)**	**3**
(Australia) Jessica Woods	1
(Hong Kong) **Ng On-yee (2)**	**3**
(Wales) Laura Evans	0

Quarter-finals; Best of 7 frames
(England) **Reanne Evans (1)**	**4**
(England) Emma Bonney (8)	2
(Latvia) **Tatjana Vasiljeva (5)**	**4**
(Germany) Diana Stateczny	1
(England) **Rebecca Kenna**	**4**
(Australia) Kathy Howden	1
(Hong Kong) Katrina Wan (7)	0
(Hong Kong) **Ng On-yee (2)**	**4**

Semi-finals; Best of 7 frames
(England) **Reanne Evans (1)**	**4**
(Latvia) Tatjana Vasiljeva (5)	1
(England) Rebecca Kenna	0
(Hong Kong) **Ng On-yee (2)**	**4**

Final; Best of 11 frames
5 April 2015
(England) **Reanne Evans (1)**	**6**
(Hong Kong) Ng On-yee (2)	4

=== Final ===
Final: Best-of-11 frames Northern Snooker Centre, Leeds; 5 April 2016
**Reanne Evans** (England)			**6**–4			Ng On-yee (Hong Kong)				
Frame	1	2	3	4	5	6	7	8	9	10
Reanne Evans; 30+ Breaks	**59**; 34	30 -	38; 38	0 -	**67** -	**62** -	40 -	**71**; 36	**53** -	**78**; 47
Ng On-yee; 30+ Breaks	29 -	**71** -	**81** -	**82**; 72	1 -	45 -	**64** -	31 -	30 -	1 -
Frames won (Evans first)	1–0	1–1	1–2	1–3	2–3	3–3	3–4	4–4	5–4	6–4
47			Highest break			72				
-			50+ breaks			1				
4			30+ breaks			-				
**Reanne Evans wins the 2016 World Ladies Snooker Championship**

== Plate competition ==
The Plate competition was for players who did not reach the main knockout draw. It was won by Varshaa Sanjeev. The only breaks over 30 were a 35 by Suzie Opacic and a 34 by Sanjeev.

Players listed in bold indicate match winner.

**Plate: Round 1**
	Score	
Danielle Findlay (ENG)	1–2	**Claire Edginton** (ENG)
**Sharon Kaur** (ENG)	2–0	Lily Dobson (ENG)
**Corina Maracine** (BEL)	2–1	Claudia Weber (SWI)
Aimee Benn (ENG)	0–2	**Michelle Brown** (ENG)
Vicky Shirley (GER)	0–2	**Suzie Opacic** (ENG)
Christine Carr (IRE)	0–2	**Steph Daughtery** (ENG)
**Jeong Min Park** (KOR)	2–1	Shannon Metcalf (ENG)
**Laura Alves** (BRA)	2–0	Lauren Carley (IRE)

Last 16; Best of 3 frames
(England) Claire Edginton	0
(England) **Jodie Allen**	**2**
(England) **Sharon Kaur**	**2**
(Republic of Ireland) Ann McMahon	1
(Belgium) Corina Maracine	0
(Republic of Ireland) **Cathy Dunne**	**2**
(England) Michelle Brown	0
(India) **Varshaa Sanjeev**	**2**
(Republic of Ireland) Sandra Bryan	0
(England) **Suzie Opacic**	**2**
(England) **Steph Daughtery**	**2**
(England) Elizabeth Black	0
(South Korea) Jeong Min Park	0
(Republic of Ireland) **Annette Newman**	**2**
(Brazil) **Laura Alves**	**2**
(Republic of Ireland) Ronda Sheldreck	0

Quarter-finals; Best of 3 frames
(England) **Jodie Allen**	**2**
(England) Sharon Kaur	0
(Republic of Ireland) Cathy Dunne	0
(India) **Varshaa Sanjeev**	**2**
(England) **Suzie Opacic**	**2**
(England) Steph Daughtery	0
(Republic of Ireland) Annette Newman	1
(Brazil) **Laura Alves**	**2**

Semi-finals; Best of 3 frames
(England) Jodie Allen	0
(India) **Varshaa Sanjeev**	**2**
(England) **Suzie Opacic**	**2**
(Brazil) Laura Alves	0

Final; Best of 5 frames
(India) **Varshaa Sanjeev**	**3**
(England) Suzie Opacic	1

== Other events ==
Apart from the plate competition, a number of other events took place around the World Championship.

- Seniors Final: Chitra Magimairaj 3–0 Sharon Kaur (The Seniors event was held on 31 March 2016)
- Under-21 Winner: Varshaa Sanjeev 3–0 Jeong Min Park (The Under-21 event was held from 3 to 5 April 2016)
- Women's Doubles Final: Ng On-yee and Katrina Wan 4–1 Maria Catalano and Tatjana Vasiljeva
- Mixed Doubles Final: Jaique Ip and Cheung Ka Wai 4–3 Maria Catalano and Eden Sharav
