= 2015 World Women's Snooker Championship =

Women's snooker event, held April 2015

2015 Eden World Women's Snooker Championship
Tournament information
- Dates: 18–21 April 2015
- Venue: Northern Snooker Centre
- City: Leeds
- Country: England
- Organisation: World Ladies Billiards and Snooker
- Format: Round Robin, Single elimination
- Total prize fund: £7,445
- Winner's share: £1500
- Highest break: 100 Reanne Evans

Final
- Champion: Ng On-yee (HKG)
- Runner-up: Emma Bonney (ENG)
- Score: 6–2

The 2015 Eden World Women's Snooker Championship was a women's snooker tournament that took place at the Northern Snooker Centre in Leeds, England, from 18 to 21 April 2015. The event was the 2015 edition of the World Women's Snooker Championship first held in 1976. The event was won by Hong Kong's Ng On-yee, who defeated Emma Bonney 6–2 in the final.

The competition was sponsored by Eden Resources.

== Background ==
The event featured eight groups of four or five players each, with the top two players from each group progressing. The event was split after the group stage, with players not reaching the main knockout tournament competing in a parallel "Plate" tournament. Matches in the group stage were three frames. The first knockout round was best-of-five frames; the quarter-finals and semi-finals the best-of-seven, and the final was played as a best-of-11.

Thirty-three players, from ten different countries, participated in the main tournament, as listed in the table below. Seventeen of the thirty-three were English.

In the previous six world championships, four different players had reached the final. Reanne Evans had won the title in each of the previous ten years, from 2005 to 2014. The 2014 final had seen Evans whitewash Ng On-yee 6–0. World billiards champion Emma Bonney, runner-up in the snooker championship in 2006 and 2011, took part in her first competitive tournament of the season. One notable absentee was Maria Catalano, four times runner-up between 2009 and 2013.

Evans had recently lost 8–10 to the 1997 men's champion, Ken Doherty, in the qualifying competition for the 2015 World Snooker Championship. Evans' loss meant she was available to compete in the Women's championship.

== Prize money ==
Source: Snooker Scene magazine, June 2015

- Winner: £1,500
- Runner-up: £1,000
- Losing semi-finalists: £500
- Losing quarter-finalists: £250
- Last 16 losers: £125

== Tournament results ==
=== Group stage ===
The qualifying group matches were played on 18 and 19 April 2015. There were eight groups of four players, and one group of five players, with the top two players from each group progressing to the knockout stage. Progression from the groups was determined, in order, by the following criteria: Matches won; Head to head; frames won; Highest break; and finally by ranking position.

The event was split after the group stage, with players not reaching the main knockout tournament competing in a parallel tournament called the Plate competition.

The only player to complete their qualifying matches without losing a frame was Jaique Ip Wan In. Five players qualified whilst only losing one frame each: Ng On-yee, Reanne Evans, Emma Bonney, Inese Lukashevska and So Man Yan. Jodie Allen, who had only taken up snooker in January 2015 having previously played pool, qualified for the next stage by coming second in her group. Elizabeth Black was the only player not to win a frame.

Evans scored the highest break of the tournament, 100, in the first frame of her match against Margaret Browne. Jessica Woods made an 85 in the second frame of her match against Evans. These were to be the highest breaks of the tournament.

=== Last 16 ===
The two top seeds from qualifying, Jaique Ip Wan In and Ng On-yee, both from Hong Kong, both beat their opponents 3–0.

Five of the six English players that had qualified for the knockout progressed to the quarter-finals. Defending champion Reanne Evans scored a 69 break during the first frame against Irina Gorbataya, and took the next two to win 3–0. Emma Bonney was 0–2 down to Anna Prisjažņuka, but won the next three to progress into the quarter-finals.

Tatjana Vasiljeva beat her Latvian compatriot 3–1 Inese Lukashevska.

=== Quarter-finals ===
Vasiljeva took the second frame against Evans to level at 1–1, before Evans won 4–1, with breaks of 65 and 55 during the match.

On-yee whitewashed Cunningham 4–0. Ip and Bonney both won 4–2, over Opacic and Poulter respectively.

=== Semi-finals ===
Both semi-finals featured a player from Hong Kong against a player from England.

Bonney lost the first frame against Ip, but won the next four to reach her third world snooker final.

On-yee took the first frame against Evans with a break of 44, but Evans then won the next two, with a 38 break in the third, to take the lead. On-yee won a close fourth frame by 53 points to 43, including a 33 break, to level the match at 2–2. On-yee then scored a 55 in taking the fifth frame 84–0, and following a poor safety shot on the brown ball by Evans in the sixth frame, won 51–47 on the black to complete a shock win.

=== Final ===
Bonney took an early lead, winning the first two frames. The next six frames were dominated by safety play, and were all won by On-yee, with the only break over 30, a 32, coming from On-yee in the seventh frame. On-yee won the match 6–2 to become the first Asian player to win the title.

The frame scores (Bonney first) were: 59–22; 68–38; 11–45; 44–72; 20–72; 14–60; 53–63; 7–72

In June 2015, On-yee played 2015 World Snooker Champion Stuart Bingham in an exhibition match in Hong Kong. Bingham won 4–1, with On-yee winning only the fourth frame, 68–41.

== Breaks ==
There were only eight breaks of over 50, by just three players. The highest break of the tournament was 100 by Reanne Evans, in the first frame of her match against Margaret Browne. The second-highest break was 85 by Jessica Woods in the second frame of her match against Evans. The other player to make breaks over 50 was On-yee with 83, 68, and 55. Evans compiled a 69, a 65 and a 55 as well as her century.

== Group stage matches ==
Group A
	Score	
Reanne Evans (ENG)	3–0	Margaret Browne (ENG)
Reanne Evans (ENG)	2–1	Jessica Woods (AUS)
Jessica Woods (AUS)	3–0	Margaret Browne (ENG)
Reanne Evans (ENG)	3–0	Anastasiya Trunina (ENG)
Margaret Browne (ENG)	1–2	Anastasiya Trunina (ENG)
Jessica Woods (AUS)	3–0	Anastasiya Trunina (ENG)

Group B
	Score	
Ng On-yee (HKG)	2–1	Yana Shut (BLR)
Michelle Brown (ENG)	0–3	Yana Shut (BLR)
Ng On-yee (HKG)	3–0	Michelle Brown (ENG)
Yana Shut (BLR)	3–0	Gaye Jones (ENG)
Ng On-yee (HKG)	3–0	Gaye Jones (ENG)
Michelle Brown (ENG)	1–2	Gaye Jones (ENG)
Yana Shut (BLR)	3–0	Annette Newman (IRE)
Ng On-yee (HKG)	3–0	Annette Newman (IRE)
Michelle Brown (ENG)	3–0	Annette Newman (IRE)
Annette Newman (IRE)	2–1	Gaye Jones (ENG)

Group C
	Score	
Maureen Rowland (ENG)	0–3	Jenny Poulter (ENG)
Maureen Rowland (ENG)	0–3	Inese Lukashevska (LAT)
Jenny Poulter (ENG)	1–2	Inese Lukashevska (LAT)
Maureen Rowland (ENG)	1–2	Elena Kurbakova (ISR)
Jenny Poulter (ENG)	3–0	Elena Kurbakova (ISR)
Inese Lukashevska (LAT)	3–0	Elena Kurbakova (ISR)

Group D
	Score	
Stephanie Daughtery (ENG)	0–3	Jasmine Bolsover (ENG)
Stephanie Daughtery (ENG)	0–3	Jaique Ip Wan In (HKG)
Jaique Ip Wan In (HKG)	3–0	Jasmine Bolsover (ENG)
Stephanie Daughtery (ENG)	1–2	Anastasia Tumilovich (LAT)
Jasmine Bolsover (ENG)	1–2	Anastasia Tumilovich (LAT)
Jaique Ip Wan In (HKG)	3–0	Anastasia Tumilovich (LAT)

Group E
	Score	
Suzie Opacic (ENG)	2–1	Irina Gorbataya (RUS)
Suzie Opacic (ENG)	2–1	Hannah Jones (ENG)
Irina Gorbataya (RUS)	2–1	Hannah Jones (ENG)
Diana Schuler (GER)	1–2	Suzie Opacic (ENG)
Diana Schuler (GER)	0–3	Irina Gorbataya (RUS)
Diana Schuler (GER)	0–3	Hannah Jones (ENG)

Group F
	Score	
Sharon Kaur (ENG)	0–3	So Man Yan (HKG)
Jodie Allen (ENG)	1–2	So Man Yan (HKG)
Sharon Kaur (ENG)	1–2	Jodie Allen (ENG)
Elizabeth Black (ENG)	0–3	So Man Yan (HKG)
Sharon Kaur (ENG)	3–0	Elizabeth Black (ENG)
Elizabeth Black (ENG)	0–3	Jodie Allen (ENG)

Group G
	Score	
Katrina Wan (HKG)	3–0	Vicky Shirley (ENG)
Vicky Shirley (ENG)	1–2	Emma Cunningham (ENG)
Katrina Wan (HKG)	0–3	Emma Cunningham (ENG)
Vicky Shirley (ENG)	0–3	Anna Prisjažņuka (LAT)
Katrina Wan (HKG)	1–2	Anna Prisjažņuka (LAT)
Anna Prisjažņuka (LAT)	1–2	Emma Cunningham (ENG)

Group H
	Score	
Tatjana Vasiljeva (LAT)	3–0	Sandra Bryan (IRE)
Tatjana Vasiljeva (LAT)	3–0	Laura Alves (BRA)
Laura Alves (BRA)	1–2	Sandra Bryan (IRE)
Tatjana Vasiljeva (LAT)	1–2	Emma Bonney (ENG)
Emma Bonney (ENG)	3–0	Sandra Bryan (IRE)
Emma Bonney (ENG)	3–0	Laura Alves (BRA)

== Knockout stage ==
Results of the main draw are shown below. Players listed in bold indicate match winners.

Last 16; Best of 5 frames
**Jaique Ip Wan In (HKG)**	**3**
Jodie Allen (ENG)	0
Yana Shut (BLR)	1
**Suzie Opacic (ENG)**	**3**
So Man Yan (HKG)	2
**Jenny Poulter (ENG)**	**3**
Anna Prisjažņuka (LAT)	2
**Emma Bonney (England)**	**3**
**Reanne Evans (ENG)**	**3**
Irina Gorbataya (RUS)	0
**Tatjana Vasiljeva (LAT)**	**3**
Inese Lukashevska (LAT)	1
**Emma Cunningham (ENG)**	**3**
Jessica Woods (AUS)	0
**Ng On-yee (HKG)**	**3**
Hoe Shu Wah (SIN)	2

Quarter-finals; Best of 7 frames
**Jaique Ip Wan In (HKG)**	**4**
Suzie Opacic (ENG)	1
Jenny Poulter (ENG)	2
**Emma Bonney (ENG)**	**4**
**Reanne Evans (ENG)**	**4**
Tatjana Vasiljeva (LAT)	1
Emma Cunningham (ENG)	0
**Ng On-yee (HKG)**	**4**

Semi-finals; Best of 7 frames
Jaique Ip Wan In (HKG)	1
**Emma Bonney (ENG)**	**4**
Reanne Evans (ENG)	2
**Ng On-yee (HKG)**	**4**

Final; Best of 11 frames
Emma Bonney (ENG)	2
**Ng On-yee (HKG)**	**6**

== Related competitions ==
The Plate competition was for players who did not reach the main knockout draw, and was held on 20 April 2016. It was won by Jasmine Bolsover, who also made the highest break, 48, in the first frame of her match against Sandra Bryan. Bolsover, aged 15, had been given special permission to take two days off from her GCSE schedule, and received £120 prize money as the winner. Vicky Shirley received £60 as runner-up. Bolsover had recently reached the final of the Connie Gough Memorial ranking tournament, where she lost to Reanne Evans.

Plate competition winner Jasmine Bolsover also won the under-21 final, and, with Reanne Evans, the Women's Doubles final. Results of finals are shown below; prize money awarded is shown in brackets.

- Seniors Final: Jenny Poulter 3–2 Sharon Kaur. (Winner £120, runner-up £60)
- Under-21 Final: Jasmine Bolsover 3–2 Yana Shut (Winner £120, runner-up £60)
- Women's Doubles Final: Reanne Evans and Jasmine Bolsover 3–0 Tatjana Vasiljeva and Suzie Opacic (Winners £150 each, runners-up £100 each)
- Mixed Doubles Final: Reanne Evans and Michael Holt 4–1 Maria Catalano and Hammad Miah (Winners £150 each, runners-up £100 each)
