= 1961 Women's Amateur Snooker Championship =

Amateur Snooker tournament, held April 1961

Women's Amateur Snooker Championship
Tournament information
- Dates: 24–29 May 1961
- Venue: Burroughes Hall
- City: London
- Country: England
- Organisation: Women's Billiards Association

Final
- Champion: Maureen Barrett (ENG)
- Runner-up: Thea March (ENG)
- Score: 4–0

The 1961 Women's Amateur Snooker Championship was an amateur snooker tournament held in 1961. The event was held from 24 to 29 April 1961 at Burroughes Hall. Maureen Barrett, who had not participated in the tournament in the two previous years, won the event, defeating Thea March 4–0 in the final.

== Main Draw ==
Round 1 Best of 5 frames
Sadie Isaacs (ENG)	3
Dorothy Thompson (ENG)	0
Maureen Barrett (ENG)	3
Ray Craven (ENG)	1
Rita Holmes (ENG)	3
D. Schofield (ENG)	0
Doreen Buckton (ENG)	3
K Bint (ENG)	0
Thea March (ENG)	3
Eileen Jones (WAL)	0

Quarter finals Best of 5 frames
Muriel Hazeldene (ENG)	3
Sadie Isaacs (ENG)	1
Evelyn Morland-Smith (ENG)	0
Maureen Barrett (ENG)	3
Rita Holmes (ENG)	3
Doreen Buckton (ENG)	2
Sally Bartley (ENG)	2
Thea March (ENG)	3

Semi finals Best of 5 frames
Muriel Hazeldene (ENG)	0
Maureen Barrett (ENG)	3
Rita Holmes (ENG)	0
Thea March (ENG)	3

Final; Best of 7 frames
Maureen Barrett (ENG)	4
Thea March (ENG)	0

=== Final ===
Final: Best of 7 frames.
Maureen Barrett; England	4–1	Thea March; England
Frame scores (Barrett first): 58-19, 43-24, 31-50, 63-32, 61-30
