= 2017 World Women's Snooker Championship =

Amateur snooker event, held March 2017

2017 Eden World Women's Snooker Championship
Tournament information
- Dates: 13–19 March 2017
- Venue: Lagoon Billiard Room
- Country: Singapore
- Organisation: World Ladies Billiards and Snooker
- Format: Round Robin, Single elimination
- Total prize fund: £15,000
- Winner's share: £5,000
- Highest break: 76 Ng On-yee

Final
- Champion: Ng On-yee (HKG)
- Runner-up: Vidya Pillai (IND)
- Score: 6–5

The 2017 World Women's Snooker Championship was a women's snooker tournament that took place at the Lagoon Billiard Room in Toa Payoh, Singapore, from 13 to 19 March 2017. The event was the 2017 edition of the World Women's Snooker Championship first held in 1976. The event was won by Hong Kong's Ng On-yee, who defeated Vidya Pillai in the final 6–5. Playing time in the final was 8 hours and 4 minutes, making it the longest recorded best-of-11-frames match, surpassing the previous record of 7 hours and 14 minutes set at the 1992 UK Championship.

The event featured a total prize fund of £15,000, with the winner receiving £5,000. On-yee scored the highest break of the tournament, a 76. The competition was sponsored by Eden Resources.

== Background ==
The tournament was held at the Lagoon Billiard Room in Toa Payoh, Singapore, the first time in more than 20 years that the women's championship had been held outside the United Kingdom. Entry was on an invitational basis, with 32 players, from ten different countries competing. The competition was sponsored by Eden Resources.

The event featured eight groups of four players, with the top two players from each group progressing. The event was split after the group stage, with players not reaching the main knockout tournament competing in a parallel tournament named the "Challenge Cup". Matches were played as best-of-five frames in the group stage, increasing in each round up to the final which was played as a best-of-11-frames match.

=== Seeding ===
There were eight seeded players for the tournament, determined by rankings following the 2017 Connie Gough Tournament held in February 2017, who were drawn into separate groups. The seeded players were:

1. Reanne Evans (ENG)
2. Ng On-yee (HKG)
3. Maria Catalano (ENG)
4. Laura Evans (WAL)
5. Tatjana Vasiljeva (LAT)
6. Suzie Opacic (ENG)
7. Katrina Wan (HKG)
8. Rebecca Granger (ENG)

== Tournament summary ==
Group stages were played on 13 March. There were eight groups of four players with the top two progressing from each group. Group stage matches were all played as best-of-five-frames, with dead frames being played. Reanne Evans won all 15 frames across her three matches, whilst both Katrina Wan and Rebecca Kenna won 14 frames each, losing just one.

In the semi-finals, Ng On-yee came back from 60 points down in the deciding frame to beat defending champion Reanne Evans 5–4. Vidya Pillai defeated Rebecca Kenna 5–1 to become the first championship finalist ever from India.

On her way to the final, Pillai defeated four of the eight seeded players – Maria Catalano in the group stage, then Tatjana Vasiljeva, Katrina Wan, and Kenna in the knockouts. On-yee against Pillai was the first all-Asian final in the history of the championship.

The semi-finals started at 10:00 am local time on Sunday, 19 March, with the final scheduled for the afternoon. On-yee had a break of only 30 minutes after her semi-final win before starting what turned out to be a lengthy final commencing at 16:00 pm.

=== Final ===
The final was played on 19 March 2019, as a best-of-11-frames match. On-yee won the first two frames before losing the next four. She then won the next three to lead 5–4, before Pillai won the tenth to take the match to the deciding frame.

The deciding frame lasted over an hour. With just pink and black balls left, and the pink lying close to the black, which was itself very close to one of the corner pockets, On-yee fouled and left a free ball. Pillai, four points behind, nominated the black but miscued and hit the pink instead, also potting the black. On-yee then potted the pink ball to take the frame 66–50 and gain her second world title, having also won in 2015.

The playing time in the final was 8 hours and 4 minutes; it was the longest 11-frame competitive match in snooker, significantly exceeding the previous record of 7 hours and 14 minutes taken by Paul Tanner to defeat Robby Foldvari 6–5 at the 1992 UK Championship. It was the first final to go to the deciding frame in the tournament since 1989, finishing at 1:30 am local time.

Across the semi-final and final, On-yee played for more than 12 hours on the Sunday (and the early part of Monday morning). She received £5,000 for her win. The winner's prize money the previous year, when Reanne Evans won, had been less than a quarter of this.

=== Breaks ===
The highest break of the tournament was 76 by On-yee. The second-highest break was scored by On-yee and Evans, who both had a 69. In all, there were only eleven breaks of 50 or over during the groups and knockout stage.

== Tournament results ==
=== Group stage ===
The top two players from each of the groups progressed into the knockout draw, where they were seeded based on group stage results. Progression from the group stages was determined, in order, by: Matches won; Head to head results; Frames won; Highest break; and Ranking position.

Group A
Won	Score	Lost
Vidya Pillai (IND)	4–1	Maria Catalano (ENG)
Paula Judge (IRE)	3–2	Jeong Min Park (KOR)
Maria Catalano (ENG)	5–0	Paula Judge (IRE)
Vidya Pillai (IND)	5–0	Jeong Min Park (KOR)
Maria Catalano (ENG)	5–0	Jeong Min Park (KOR)
Vidya Pillai (IND)	3–2	Paula Judge (IRE)

Group B
Won	Score	Lost
Waratthanun Sukritthanes (THA)	3–2	Tatjana Vasiljeva (LAT)
Waratthanun Sukritthanes (THA)	5–0	Tan Bee Yen (SIN)
Tatjana Vasiljeva (LAT)	3–2	Tan Bee Yen (SIN)
Waratthanun Sukritthanes (THA)	5–0	Sunita Khandelwal (IND)
Tatjana Vasiljeva (LAT)	5–0	Sunita Khandelwal (IND)
Tan Bee Yen (SIN)	4–1	Sunita Khandelwal (IND)

Group C
Won	Score	Lost
Reanne Evans (ENG)	5–0	Suniti Damani (IND)
Nutcharut Wongharuthai (THA)	5–0	Suniti Damani (IND)
Reanne Evans (ENG)	5–0	Nutcharut Wongharuthai (THA)
Hoe Shu Wah (SIN)	3–2	Suniti Damani (IND)
Reanne Evans (ENG)	5–0	Hoe Shu Wah (SIN)
Hoe Shu Wah (SIN)	3–2	Nutcharut Wongharuthai (THA)

Group D
Won	Score	Lost
Ng On-yee (HKG)	4–1	Charlene Chai (SIN)
Ng On-yee (HKG)	4–1	Chitra Magimairaj (IND)
Ng On-yee (HKG)	5–0	Ronda Sheldreck (IRE)
Chitra Magimairaj (IND)	5–0	Ronda Sheldreck (IRE)
Charlene Chai (SIN)	5–0	Ronda Sheldreck (IRE)
Charlene Chai (SIN)	3–2	Chitra Magimairaj (IND)

Group E
Won	Score	Lost
So Man Yan (HKG)	4–1	Suzie Opacic (ENG)
Baipat Siripaporn (THA)	3–2	Suzie Opacic (ENG)
Baipat Siripaporn (THA)	4–1	So Man Yan (HKG)
Amee Kamani (IND)	3–2	Suzie Opacic (ENG)
So Man Yan (HKG)	3–2	Amee Kamani (IND)
Amee Kamani (IND)	3–2	Baipat Siripaporn (THA)

Group F
Won	Score	Lost
Rebecca Kenna (ENG)	5–0	Neeta Kothari (IND)
Rebecca Kenna (ENG)	4–1	Jessica Tan Hui Ming (SIN)
Jessica Tan Hui Ming (SIN)	3–2	Neeta Kothari (IND)
Rebecca Kenna (ENG)	5–0	Pui Ying Mini Chu (HKG)
Pui Ying Mini Chu (HKG)	3–2	Neeta Kothari (IND)
Pui Ying Mini Chu (HKG)	5–0	Jessica Tan Hui Ming (SIN)

Group G
Won	Score	Lost
Regina Toh (SIN)	4–1	Neelam Mittal (IND)
Katrina Wan (HKG)	4–1	Regina Toh (SIN)
Katrina Wan (HKG)	5–0	Neelam Mittal (IND)
Diana Schuler (GER)	4–1	Regina Toh (SIN)
Diana Schuler (GER)	4–1	Neelam Mittal (POL)
Katrina Wan (HKG)	5–0	Diana Schuler (GER)

Group H
Won	Score	Lost
Varshaa Sanjeev (IND)	5–0	Lin Meimei (SIN)
Varshaa Sanjeev (IND)	4–1	Ho Yee Ki (HKG)
Varshaa Sanjeev (IND)	3–2	Laura Evans (WAL)
Laura Evans (WAL)	5–0	Lin Meimei (SIN)
Ho Yee Ki (HKG)	5–0	Lin Meimei (SIN)
Laura Evans (WAL)	5–0	Ho Yee Ki (HKG)

== Knockout ==
Source: WPBSA Tournament Manager. Players listed in bold indicate match winner.

Last 16; Best of 7 frames
(England) **Reanne Evans**	**4**
(Germany) Diana Schuler	0
(Thailand) **Baipat Siripaporn**	**4**
(Wales) Laura Evans	3
(Hong Kong) **Ng On-yee**	**4**
(Hong Kong) Pui Ying Mini Chu	0
(Thailand) **Waratthanun Sukritthanes**	**4**
(England) Maria Catalano	3
(Latvia) Tatjana Vasiljeva	1
(India) **Vidya Pillai**	**4**
(Hong Kong) So Man Yan	2
(Hong Kong) **Katrina Wan**	**4**
(Singapore) Charlene Chai	1
(India) **Varshaa Sanjeev**	**4**
(England) **Rebecca Kenna**	**4**
(Singapore) Hoe Shu Wah	2

Quarter-finals; Best of 7 frames
(England) **Reanne Evans**	**4**
(Thailand) Baipat Siripaporn	1
(Hong Kong) **Ng On-yee**	**4**
(Thailand) Waratthanun Sukritthanes	3
(India) **Vidya Pillai**	**4**
(Hong Kong) Katrina Wan	1
(India) Varshaa Sanjeev	1
(England) **Rebecca Kenna**	**4**

Semi-finals; Best of 9 frames
19 March
(England) Reanne Evans	4
(Hong Kong) **Ng On-yee**	**5**
19 March
(India) **Vidya Pillai**	**5**
(England) Rebecca Kenna	1

Final; Best of 11 frames
19 March
(Hong Kong) **Ng On-yee**	**6**
(India) Vidya Pillai	5

== Challenge cup ==
The challenge cup was a competition for players who did not reach the main knockout draw. It was won by Amee Kamani. The highest break was 90 by Nutcharut Wongharuthai in her match against Neelam Mittal. Players listed in bold indicate match winners.

Last 16; Best of 5 frames
(England) **Suzie Opacic**	**3**
(South Korea) Jeong Min Park	0
(Thailand) **Nutcharut Wongharuthai**	**3**
(India) Neelam Mittal	0
(India) **Chitra Magimaraj**	**3**
(Singapore) Lin Meimei	0
(Hong Kong) Ho Yee Ki	2
(Singapore) **Jessica Tan Hui Ming**	**3**
(India) **Suniti Damani**	**3**
(Republic of Ireland) Paula Judge	2
(India) **Amee Kamani**	**3**
(Singapore) Regina Toh	1
(India) **Neeta Kothari**	**3**
(India) Sunita Khandelwal	1
(Republic of Ireland) Ronda Sheldreck	0
(Singapore) **Tan Bee Yen**	**3**

Quarter-finals; Best of 5 frames
(England) Suzie Opacic	1
(Thailand) **Nutcharut Wongharuthai**	**3**
(India) **Chitra Magimaraj**	**3**
(Singapore) Jessica Tan Hui Ming	2
(India) Suniti Damani	1
(India) **Amee Kamani**	**3**
(India) Neeta Kothari	0
(Singapore) **Tan Bee Yen**	**3**

Semi-finals; Best of 5 frames
(Thailand) **Nutcharut Wongharuthai**	**3**
(India) Chitra Magimaraj	0
(India) **Amee Kamani**	**3**
(Singapore) Tan Bee Yen	1

Final; Best of 7 frames
18 March
(Thailand) Nutcharut Wongharuthai	2
(India) **Amee Kamani**	**4**
