= 2022 UK Women's Snooker Championship =

Women's snooker tournament

Tournament information
- Dates: 30–31 July 2022
- Venue: Northern Snooker Centre
- City: Leeds
- Country: England
- Organisation: World Women's Snooker
- Highest break: Ng On-yee (HKG) (97)

Final
- Champion: Reanne Evans (ENG)
- Runner-up: Ng On-yee (HKG)
- Score: 4‍–‍3

The 2022 UK Women's Snooker Championship (officially the 2022 Taom UK Women's Snooker Championship) was a women's snooker tournament that took place from 30 to 31 July 2022 at the Northern Snooker Centre in Leeds, England. It was organised by World Women's Snooker.

Reanne Evans was the defending champion, having defeated Rebecca Kenna 4‍–‍0 in the 2021 final. Evans defeated Ng On-yee 4‍–‍3 in the final to retain the title. Ng produced a 97 break, the highest of the tournament.

== Format ==
The top two players were seeded through to the last-16. The remaining players were drawn in nine groups, each containing four or five players. Those matches were played as the best of 3 frames. The top two players from each group qualified for the knockout stage: the group winners and the best runner-up progressed to the last-16, while the remaining eight runners-up had to play a last-32 round. The last-32 round was played as the best of 3 frames, while the last-16 round and the quarter-finals were played as the best of 5 frames. The semi-finals and the final were played as the best of 7 frames.

== Knockout ==
The draw for the tournament's knockout rounds is shown below. The match winners are shown in bold.

**Last 32**; Best of 3 frames
Zoe Killington (ENG)	0
**Chucky Preston (NIR)**	**2**
**Tessa Davidson (ENG)**	**2**
Laura Killington (ENG)	0
Chloe Payne (ENG)	0
**Nat Howard (ENG)**	**2**
**Jasmine Bolsover (ENG)**	**2**
Louise Burton (ENG)	0

**Last 16**; Best of 5 frames
**Reanne Evans (ENG)**	**3**
Chucky Preston (NIR)	0
**Jamie Hunter (ENG)**	**3**
Emma Parker (ENG)	1
**Rebecca Kenna (ENG)**	**3**
Chu Pui Ying (HKG)	0
Tessa Davidson (ENG)	1
**Ploychompoo Laokiatphong (THA)**	**3**
**Ng On-yee (HKG)**	**3**
Nat Howard (ENG)	0
Maria Catalano (ENG)	2
**Yee Ki Ho (HKG)**	**3**
**Laura Evans (WAL)**	**3**
Steph Daughtery (ENG)	0
Jasmine Bolsover (ENG)	2
**Mink Nutcharut (THA)**	**3**

**Quarter-finals**; Best of 5 frames
**Reanne Evans (ENG)**	**3**
Jamie Hunter (ENG)	1
**Rebecca Kenna (ENG)**	**3**
Ploychompoo Laokiatphong (THA)	0
**Ng On-yee (HKG)**	**3**
Yee Ki Ho (HKG)	1
Laura Evans (WAL)	0
**Mink Nutcharut (THA)**	**3**

**Semi-finals**; Best of 7 frames
**Reanne Evans (ENG)**	**4**
Rebecca Kenna (ENG)	1
**Ng On-yee (HKG)**	**4**
Mink Nutcharut (THA)	0

**Final**; Best of 7 frames
**Reanne Evans (ENG)**	**4**
Ng On-yee (HKG)	3
