= 1962 Women's Amateur Snooker Championship =

Amateur Snooker tournament, held May 1962

Women's Amateur Snooker Championship
Tournament information
- Dates: May 1962
- Venue: Burroughes Hall
- City: London
- Country: England
- Organisation: Women's Billiards Association

Final
- Champion: Maureen Baynton (ENG)
- Runner-up: Rita Holmes (ENG)
- Score: 4–1

The 1962 Women's Amateur Snooker Championship was an amateur snooker tournament held in May 1962 at Burroughes Hall. Maureen Barrett successfully defended her title, defeating Rita Holmes 4–1 in the final.

== Main Draw ==
Round 1 Best of 5 frames
Maureen Baynton (ENG)	3
L. Haywood (WAL)	0
Eileen Jones (WAL)	3
K. Bint (ENG)	1
Ray Craven (ENG)	3
L. Walby (ENG)	0

Quarter finals Best of 5 frames
Maureen Baynton (ENG)	3
Sadie Isaacs (ENG)	0
Eileen Jones (WAL)	3
Ray Craven (ENG)	1
Doreen Buckton (ENG)	3
E. Tabor (ENG)	1
Muriel Hazeldene (ENG)	0
Rita Holmes (ENG)	3

Semi finals Best of 5 frames
Maureen Baynton (ENG)	3
Eileen Jones (WAL)	0
Doreen Buckton (ENG)	0
Rita Holmes (ENG)	3

Final; Best of 7 frames
Maureen Baynton (ENG)	4
Rita Holmes (ENG)	1
