= 1984 Women's World Amateur Snooker Championship =

Women's snooker event, held April 2011

Tournament information
- Dates: 6–7 October 1984
- Venue: Breaks Snooker Sporting Club
- City: Coventry
- Country: England
- Organisation: World Ladies Billiards and Snooker Association
- Format: Single elimination
- Total prize fund: £3,000
- Winner's share: £1,000
- Highest break: Stacey Hillyard (ENG) 48

Final
- Champion: Stacey Hillyard (ENG)
- Runner-up: Natalie Stelmach (CAN)
- Score: 4–1

The 1984 Women's World Amateur Snooker Championship was a 1984 edition of the World Women's Snooker Championship, first held in 1976, and was played at the Breaks Snooker Sporting Club, Coventry, from 6 to 7 October. The tournament was won by Stacey Hillyard, aged 15, who defeated Natalie Stelmach 4–1 in the final.

== Overview ==
Following the 1983 Women's World Snooker Championship, the promotional company Ladies Snooker International, which was controlled by some of the same personnel involved in the World Ladies Billiards and Snooker Association (WLBSA), announced the initiation of a professional division for women's snooker, which later included the 1984 Women's Grand Prix, but not a world professional championship.

The 1984 Women's World Amateur Snooker Championship, organised by the WLBSA, had 64 entrants and was sponsored by First Leisure and Bass Mitchells and Butlers, with a prize fund of £3,000. The top sixteen seeds joined the draw at the last 32 stage. First round matches were the best-of-three frames, and the other rounds before the quarter-finals were the best-of-five frames, these being played on 6 October. Matches from the quarter-finals onwards were the best-of-seven frames, and were played on 7 October.

The top seed, Allison Fisher, aged 16, took a 2–0 lead in her semi-final against Hillyard, aged 15, but lost the third frame on the black. Fisher won the next to lead 3–1, before Hillyard levelled the match at 3–3 and followed this by winning the deciding frame of the pink. Hillyard took a 2–0 lead against Stelmach in the final, and after losing the third frame, went on to win 4–1 and take the title and win £1,000 in prize money.

Hillyard also compiled the highest break of the event, 48, for which she earned a further £100.

=== Prize fund ===
There was a total prize fund of £3,000. The breakdown of prize money for the event is shown below:

- Winner: £1,000
- Runner-up: £500
- Semi-finalists: £250
- Quarter-finalists: £125
- Last 16: £50
- Highest break: £100

== Main Draw ==
The numbers in parentheses beside some of the players are their seeding ranks where known, while players in bold denote match winners.

**Last 16**; Best of 5 frames
**Allison Fisher (ENG)** (1) | **3**
Pat Daubney (ENG) | 1
**Maria Tart (ENG)** | **3**
Julie Dowen (ENG) | 2
**Stacey Hillyard (ENG)** | **3**
Val Doyle (ENG) (Note: The Cue World source says that Hillyard defeated May Smith 3–1 in the last 16) | 1
**Rhonda Jackman (CAN)** | **3**
Maureen Seto (CAN) | 0
**Caroline Walch (ENG)** (3) | **3**
Maria Johnson (ENG) | 2
**Serena Sinanan (ENG)** | **3**
Claire Burgess (ENG) | 2
**Gaye Jones (ENG)** | **3**
A. Ratcliffe (ENG) | 1
**Natalie Stelmach (CAN)** (2) | **3**
Maggie Beer (ENG) | 1

**Quarter-finals**; Best of 7 frames
**Allison Fisher (ENG)** (1) | **4**
Maria Tart (ENG) | 0
**Stacey Hillyard (ENG)** | **4**
Rhonda Jackman (CAN) | 1
**Caroline Walch (ENG)** (3) | **4**
Serena Sinanan (ENG) | 3
Gaye Jones (ENG) | 0
**Natalie Stelmach (CAN)** (2) | **4**

**Semi-finals**; Best of 7 frames
Allison Fisher (ENG) (1) | 3
**Stacey Hillyard (ENG)** | **4**
Caroline Walch (ENG) (3) | 0
**Natalie Stelmach (CAN)** (2) | **4**

**Final**; Best of 7 frames
**Stacey Hillyard (ENG)** | **4**
Natalie Stelmach (CAN) (2) | 1

Final: Best-of-7 frames. Breaks Snooker Sporting Club, Coventry, 7 October 1984
| **Stacey Hillyard** (England) | **4**–1 | | Natalie Stelmach (Canada) | | |
| Frame | 1 | 2 | 3 | 4 | 5 |
| Stacey Hillyard | **63** | **72** | 36 | **64** | **58** |
| Natalie Stelmach | 33 | 14 | **50** | 17 | 34 |
| Frames won (Hillyard first) | 1–0 | 2–0 | 2–1 | 3–1 | 4–1 |
**Stacey Hillyard wins the 1984 Women's World Amateur Snooker Championship**
