= 1981 Women's World Open (snooker) =

Women's snooker event, held May 1981

Tournament information
- Dates: May 1981
- City: Thorness Bay
- Country: England
- Organisation: Women's Billiards Association
- Format: Single elimination
- Winner's share: £2,000

Final
- Champion: Vera Selby (ENG)
- Runner-up: Mandy Fisher (ENG)
- Score: 3–0

The 1981 Women's World Open was a women's snooker tournament that took place in May 1981 at Thorness Bay, organised by the Women's Billiards Association and sponsored by Guinness. It is recognised as the 1981 edition of the World Women's Snooker Championship first held in 1976. Vera Selby defeated Mandy Fisher 3–0 in the final to win the title, receiving £2,000 prize money as champion.

Defending champion Lesley McIlrath was beaten 2–3 in the quarter-finals by Sue Foster. Selby, the 1976 champion did not lose a frame during the tournament. In reaching the final she beat Mandy Walton 2–0, then recorded 3–0 wins over Grace Cayley, Maryann McConnell and Foster. Fisher had wins over Ann Johnson and Fran Lovis on her route to the final and received £1,000 as runner-up. Clive Everton wrote of the tournament "Mrs Selby's cool temperament, sure grasp of tactics and safety play overcame technically more gifted players."

== Main Draw ==
Best of 5 frames

Quarter-finals
(Australia) Lesley McIlrath	2
(England) Sue Foster	3
(England) Vera Selby	3
(Canada) Maryann McConnell	0
(England) Ann Johnson	1
(England) Mandy Fisher	3
(Canada) Natalie Stelmach	1
(Australia) Fran Lovis	3

Semi-finals
(England) Sue Foster	0
(England) Vera Selby	3
(England) Mandy Fisher	3
(Australia) Fran Lovis	1

Final
(England) Vera Selby	3
(England) Mandy Fisher	0
