= 2018 UK Women's Snooker Championship =

Women's snooker tournament

Tournament information
- Dates: 15–16 September 2018
- Venue: Northern Snooker Centre
- City: Leeds
- Country: England
- Organisation: World Women's Snooker
- Highest break: Ploychompoo Laokiatphong (THA) (62)

Final
- Champion: Ng On-yee (HKG)
- Runner-up: Rebecca Kenna (ENG)
- Score: 4–1

The 2018 UK Women's Snooker Championship (oficially the 2018 LITEtask UK Women's Championship) was a women's snooker tournament that took place from 15 to 16 September 2018 at the Northern Snooker Centre in Leeds, England. It was organised by World Women's Snooker.

Ng On-yee was the defending champion, having defeated Reanne Evans 4–1 in the 2017 final. Ng defeated Rebecca Kenna 4–1 in the final to retain the title. The highest break of the tournament was a 62 made by Ploychompoo Laokiatphong in the group stage.

== Knockout ==
The draw for the tournament's knockout rounds is shown below. The match winners are shown in bold.

**Last 16**; Best of 5 frames
**Ng On-yee (HKG)**	**3**
Suzie Terry (ENG)	2
Steph Daughtery (ENG)	0
**Ploychompoo Laokiatphong (THA)**	**3**
**Jaique Ip (HKG)**	**3**
Connie Stephens (ENG)	0
Maria Catalano (ENG)	1
**Yee Ki Ho (HKG)**	**3**
**Mink Nutcharut (THA)**	**3**
Diana Schuler (GER)	0
**Katrina Wan (HKG)**	**3**
Aimee Benn (ENG)	0
**Jenny Poulter (ENG)**	**3**
Maureen Rowland (ENG)	0
Reanne Evans (ENG)	2
**Rebecca Kenna (ENG)**	**3**

**Quarter-finals**; Best of 5 frames
**Ng On-yee (HKG)**	**3**
Ploychompoo Laokiatphong (THA)	0
**Jaique Ip (HKG)**	**3**
Yee Ki Ho (HKG)	1
**Mink Nutcharut (THA)**	**3**
Katrina Wan (HKG)	0
Jenny Poulter (ENG)	0
**Rebecca Kenna (ENG)**	**3**

**Semi-finals**; Best of 7 frames
**Ng On-yee (HKG)**	**4**
Jaique Ip (HKG)	0
Mink Nutcharut (THA)	3
**Rebecca Kenna (ENG)**	**4**

**Final**; Best of 7 frames
**Ng On-yee (HKG)**	**4**
Rebecca Kenna (ENG)	1
