= 2019 UK Women's Snooker Championship =

Women's snooker tournament

Tournament information
- Dates: 14–15 September 2019
- Venue: Northern Snooker Centre
- City: Leeds
- Country: England
- Organisation: World Women's Snooker
- Highest break: Reanne Evans (ENG) (105)
- Defending champion: Ng On-yee (ENG)

Final
- Champion: Reanne Evans (ENG)
- Runner-up: Maria Catalano (ENG)
- Score: 4–2

The 2019 UK Women's Snooker Championship was a women's snooker tournament that took place from 14 to 15 September 2019 at the Northern Snooker Centre in Leeds, England. It was organised by World Women's Snooker.

Ng On-yee was the defending champion, having defeated Rebecca Kenna 4–1 in the 2018 final. Reanne Evans defeated Maria Catalano 4–2 in the final to win the title. Evans produced a 105 break in the quarter-finals, the highest of the tournament.

== Overview ==
=== Format ===
The top eight players were seeded through to the last 16. The remaining 24 players were drawn in eight groups, each containing three players. Those matches were played as the best of 3 frames. The top two players from each group qualified for the knockout stage, where they met in a last-24 round, also played as the best of 3 frames, before joining the seeds at the last-16 round. The last-16 round and the quarter-finals were played as the best of 5 frames. The semi-finals and the final were played as the best of 7 frames.

=== Prize fund ===
The winner of the event received £2,000. The breakdown of prize money is shown below:

- Winner: £2,000
- Runner-up: £1,000
- Semi-finalists: £700
- Quarter-finalists: £500
- Last 16: £125

== Knockout ==
The draw for the tournament's knockout rounds is shown below. The match winners are shown in bold.

**Last 32**; Best of 3 frames
Annette Lord (ENG)	0
**Zoe Killington (ENG)**	**2**
**Mei Mei Fong (HKG)**	**2**
Hind Bennani (MAR)	1
**Chrissy Allwood (ENG)**	**2**
Claire Edginton (ENG)	1
**Chloe White (ENG)**	**2**
Emma Brown (ENG)	0
**Connie Stephens (ENG)**	**2**
Louise Burton (ENG)	0
Jenny Poulter (ENG)	0
**Jodie Lockett (ENG)**	**2**
**Ploychompoo Laokiatphong (THA)**	**2**
Nat Howard (ENG)	0
Maureen Rowland (ENG)	1
**Mariia Shevchenko**	**2**

**Last 16**; Best of 5 frames
**Reanne Evans (ENG)**	**3**
Zoe Killington (ENG)	0
**Mei Mei Fong (HKG)**	**3**
Ip Wan In Jaique (HKG)	1
**Suzie Terry (ENG)**	**3**
Chrissy Allwood (ENG)	1
Chloe White (ENG)	1
**Laura Evans (WAL)**	**3**
**Maria Catalano (ENG)**	**3**
Connie Stephens (ENG)	0
Jodie Lockett (ENG)	0
**Emma Parker (ENG)**	**3**
Steph Daughtery (ENG)	0
**Ploychompoo Laokiatphong (THA)**	**3**
Mariia Shevchenko	0
**Rebecca Kenna (ENG)**	**3**

**Quarter-finals**; Best of 5 frames
**Reanne Evans (ENG)**	**3**
Mei Mei Fong (HKG)	2
Suzie Terry (ENG)	1
**Laura Evans (WAL)**	**3**
**Maria Catalano (ENG)**	**3**
Emma Parker (ENG)	2
**Ploychompoo Laokiatphong (THA)**	**3**
Rebecca Kenna (ENG)	1

**Semi-finals**; Best of 7 frames
**Reanne Evans (ENG)**	**4**
Laura Evans (WAL)	0
**Maria Catalano (ENG)**	**4**
Ploychompoo Laokiatphong (THA)	2

**Final**; Best of 7 frames
**Reanne Evans (ENG)**	**4**
Maria Catalano (ENG)	2

== Century breaks ==
The tournament produced one century break, a 105 by Reanne Evans in the quarter-finals.
