= 2018 World Women's Snooker Championship =

Amateur snooker championship, held March 2018

Tournament information
- Dates: 14–17 March 2018
- Venue: Dolmen Hotel
- City: St. Paul's Bay
- Country: Malta
- Organisation: World Snooker Federation / World Ladies Billiards and Snooker
- Format: Round Robin, Single elimination
- Total prize fund: €17,000
- Winner's share: €6,000
- Highest break: Wendy Jans (110)

Final
- Champion: (Hong Kong) Ng On-yee
- Runner-up: (England) Maria Catalano
- Score: 5–0

The 2018 World Women's Snooker Championship was a women's snooker tournament that took place at the Dolmen Hotel, St. Paul's Bay, in Malta from 14 to 17 March 2018. Defending champion Ng On-yee won the event with a 5–0 win against Maria Catalano in the final. Ng On-yee won the title without losing a single frame over all six of her matches and as champion, qualified to enter the 2018 World Snooker Championship.

This was the first time that the snooker world championship for women was organised under the banner of the World Snooker Federation (WSF). The WSF was formed in October 2017, supported by the World Professional Billiards and Snooker Association and the European Billiards and Snooker Association. The event saw a slightly increased prize fund, with the winner receiving €6,000.

== Prize fund ==
The breakdown of prize money for the event is shown below:

- Winner: €6,000
- Runner-up: €3,000
- Semi-final: €1,300
- Quarter-final: €700
- Last 16: €300
- Highest break: €200
- Total: €17,000

== Overview ==
The event featured 24 participants and was open to players nominated by their national federations, if the federations were members of the World Snooker Federation by 1 March 2018. The top 30 ranked players (as calculated following the 2018 British Open) were eligible to be nominated. Each National Federation (NF) was able to nominate up to four additional players to take part, as well as those in the top 30 of the rankings. The participants featured five from England; four from Hong Kong and from Poland; two each from Belgium, Brazil, Ireland, and Thailand; and one from Australia, Netherlands and Wales.

Of the players in the top 30 in the world rankings, the following players competed in the world championships: Laura Evans, Maria Catalano, Ng On-yee, Paula Judge, Reanne Evans, Rebecca Kenna, Ronda Sheldreck, Suzie Opacic. In addition, sixteen players were added from outside of the top 30 players: Ewelina Pislewska, Fatima Gusso Rigoni, Inge Vermeulen, Jaique Ip Wan In, Jacqueline Ellis, Joanna Grochal, Judy Dangerfield, Katarzyna Bialik, Malgorzata Sikorska, Manon Melief, Mei Mei Fong, Nicolly Christo, Nutcharut Wongharuthai, Waratthanun Sukritthanes, Wendy Jans, Yee Ting Cheung.

== Tournament summary ==
In the group stage, Ng On-yee, Reanne Evans, and Waratthanun Sukritthanes all won their groups without losing a frame. Wendy Jans made a highest break of 110 against Suzie Opacic, which turned out to be the only century break of the tournament. All four players from Hong Kong reached the knockout stages, but three of them lost in their first knockout matches.

In the quarter-finals and semi-finals, only the semi-final between Reanne Evans and Maria Catalano went to a deciding frame, with Catalano the surprising winner. Rebecca Kenna reached the semi-finals for the third year in a row.

Ng On-yee's 5–0 whitewashing of Catalano in the final meant Ng On-yee had won the title for the third time, this time having won six matches and a total of 22 frames throughout the tournament without conceding any. This was despite Ng On-yee having low expectations at the start of the tournament, as she was feeling under pressure, suffering from loss of form, and ill with a cough.

In addition to the trophy and title, winning provided Ng On-yee with a place in the qualifying rounds of the 2018 World Snooker Championship, her previous two attempts at the World Snooker Championship having both ended at the first match.

== Results ==
=== Group stage ===
The group stage began 14 March 2018, with six groups of four players. Each match was played as a best-of-5-frames. The top two players from each group qualified for the knockout round. Progression from the group stages was determined, by: matches won; head-to-head results; frames won; highest break; and lastly ranking position.

**Group A**
Won	Score	Lost
Ng On-yee (HKG)	3–0	Katarzyna Bialik (POL)
Judy Dangerfield (AUS)	3–0	Ronda Sheldreck (IRE)
Ng On-yee (HKG)	3–0	Ronda Sheldreck (IRE)
Ng On-yee (HKG)	3–0	Judy Dangerfield (AUS)
Judy Dangerfield (AUS)	3–0	Katarzyna Bialik (POL)
Katarzyna Bialik (POL)	3–1	Ronda Sheldreck (IRE)

**Group B**
Won	Score	Lost
Yee Ting Cheung (HKG)	3–0	Manon Melief (NLD)
Reanne Evans (ENG)	3–0	Fatima Gusso Rigoni (BRA)
Reanne Evans (ENG)	3–0	Yee Ting Cheung (HKG)
Reanne Evans (ENG)	3–0	Manon Melief (NLD)
Manon Melief (NLD)	3–0	Fatima Gusso Rigoni (BRA)
Yee Ting Cheung (HKG)	3–0	Fatima Gusso Rigoni (BRA)

**Group C**
Won	Score	Lost
Rebecca Kenna (ENG)	3–0	Malgorzata Sikorska (POL)
Nutcharut Wongharuthai (THA)	3–0	Nicolly Christo (BRA)
Nicolly Christo (BRA)	3–1	Malgorzata Sikorska (POL)
Nutcharut Wongharuthai (THA)	3–0	Nicolly Christo (BRA)
Rebecca Kenna (ENG)	3–0	Malgorzata Sikorska (POL)
Nutcharut Wongharuthai (THA)	3–2	Rebecca Kenna (ENG)

**Group D**
Won	Score	Lost
Maria Catalano (ENG)	3–0	Inge Vermeulen (BEL)
Mei Mei Fong (HKG)	3–2	Paula Judge (IRE)
Maria Catalano (ENG)	3–1	Mei Mei Fong (HKG)
Maria Catalano (ENG)	3–0	Paula Judge (IRE)
Paula Judge (IRE)	3–0	Inge Vermeulen (BEL)
Mei Mei Fong (HKG)	3–1	Inge Vermeulen (BEL)

**Group E**
Won	Score	Lost
Laura Evans (WAL)	3–0	Joanna Grochal (POL)
Waratthanun Sukritthanes (THA)	3–0	Jacqueline Ellis (ENG)
Laura Evans (WAL)	3–0	Jacqueline Ellis (ENG)
Joanna Grochal (POL)	3–0	Jacqueline Ellis (ENG)
Waratthanun Sukritthanes (THA)	3–0	Joanna Grochal (POL)
Waratthanun Sukritthanes (THA)	3–0	Laura Evans (WAL)

**Group F**
Won	Score	Lost
Wendy Jans (BEL)	3–0	Ewelina Pislewska (POL)
Ip Wan In Jaique (HKG)	3–2	Suzie Opacic (ENG)
Wendy Jans (BEL)	3–1	Ip Wan In Jaique (HKG)
Wendy Jans (BEL)	3–2	Suzie Opacic (ENG)
Suzie Opacic (ENG)	3–1	Ewelina Pislewska (POL)
Ip Wan In Jaique (HKG)	3–0	Ewelina Pislewska (POL)

=== Main draw ===
The numbers in parentheses are players' seedings. Players listed in bold indicate match winner.

Last 16; Best of 7 frames
(England) **Reanne Evans**	N/A
Bye	N/A
16 March
(Wales) **Laura Evans** (9)	**4**
(Australia) Judy Dangerfileld (8)	1
16 March
(Thailand) **Nutcharut Wongharuthai** (5)	**4**
(Hong Kong) Ip Wan-In Jaique (12)	0
(England) **Maria Catalano**	N/A
Bye	N/A
(Hong Kong) **Ng On-yee**	N/A
Bye	N/A
16 March
(Hong Kong) Mei Mei Fong (11)	0
(Belgium) **Wendy Jans** (6)	**4**
16 March
(England) **Rebecca Kenna** (7)	**4**
(Hong Kong) Yee Ting Cheung (10)	3
(Thailand) **Waratthanun Sukritthanes**	N/A
Bye	N/A

Quarter-finals; Best of 7 frames
16 March
(England) **Reanne Evans** (1)	**4**
(Wales) Laura Evans (9)	1
16 March
(Thailand) Nutcharut Wongharuthai (5)	1
(England) **Maria Catalano** (4)	**4**
16 March
(Hong Kong) **Ng On-yee** (3)	**4**
(Belgium) Wendy Jans (6)	0
16 March 2018
(England) **Rebecca Kenna** (7)	**4**
(Thailand) Waratthanun Sukritthanes (2)	2

Semi-finals; Best of 7 frames
17 March
(England) Reanne Evans (1)	3
(England) **Maria Catalano** (4)	**4**
17 March
(Hong Kong) **Ng On-yee** (3)	**4**
(England) Rebecca Kenna (7)	0

Final; Best of 9 frames
17 March
(England) Maria Catalano (4)	0
(Hong Kong) **Ng On-yee** (3)	**5**
