= UK Women's Snooker Championship =

Tournament on the World Women's Snooker Tour

Tournament information
- Venue: Northern Snooker Centre
- Location: Leeds, England
- Established: 1982
- Organisation(s): World Women's Snooker
- Recent edition: 2026
- Current champion: Bai Yulu (CHN)

The UK Women's Snooker Championship (also known as the UK Ladies Championship or the UK Women's Championship for some editions) is a tournament on the World Women's Snooker Tour. Bai Yulu is the current champion.

== History ==
The event was held for the first time in May 1982. Mandy Fisher defeated Sue Foster 3‍–‍1 to claim the title. The most successful competitor is Reanne Evans, who has won the championship twelve times, including a run of seven consecutive times between 2005 and 2011.

== Winners ==
Year	Winner	Runner-up	Final score	City	Ref.
1982 (May)	Mandy Fisher (ENG)	Sue Foster (ENG)	3‍–‍1	Bournemouth (ENG)	
1982 (Nov)	Sue Foster (ENG)	Mandy Fisher (ENG)	3‍–‍1	Leicester (ENG)	
1985	Allison Fisher (ENG)	Caroline Walch (ENG)	3‍–‍0	Leicester (ENG)	
1986	Allison Fisher (ENG)	Stacey Hillyard (ENG)	4‍–‍2	Leicester (ENG)	
1987	Allison Fisher (ENG)	Mandy Fisher (ENG)	5‍–‍1	Leicester (ENG)	
1988	Allison Fisher (ENG)	Stacey Hillyard (ENG)	5‍–‍2	Leicester (ENG)	
1989	Tessa Davidson (ENG)	Stacey Hillyard (ENG)	4‍–‍1	Leicester (ENG)	
1990	Allison Fisher (ENG)	Stacey Hillyard (ENG)	5‍–‍0	Leicester (ENG)	
1992	Tessa Davidson (ENG)	Stacey Hillyard (ENG)	4‍–‍3	Tonbridge (ENG)	
1993	Stacey Hillyard (ENG)	Tessa Davidson (ENG)	4‍–‍3	Lowestoft (ENG)	
1994	Karen Corr (NIR)	Stacey Hillyard (ENG)	4‍–‍3	Lowestoft (ENG)	
1995	Karen Corr (NIR)	Allison Fisher (ENG)	4‍–‍3	Prestatyn (WAL)	
1997	Karen Corr (NIR)	Lynette Horsburgh (SCO)	4‍–‍3	Preston (ENG)	
1998	Tessa Davidson (ENG)	Kelly Fisher (ENG)	4‍–‍0	Bournemouth (ENG)	
1999	Kelly Fisher (ENG)	Emma Bonney (ENG)	4‍–‍0	Bournemouth (ENG)	
2000	Kelly Fisher (ENG)	Katie Henrick (ENG)	4‍–‍0	Bournemouth (ENG)	
2001	Kelly Fisher (ENG)	Lynette Horsburgh (SCO)	4‍–‍1	York (ENG)	
2002	Kelly Fisher (ENG)	Wendy Jans (BEL)	4‍–‍1	York (ENG)	
2004	Lynette Horsburgh (SCO)	Reanne Evans (ENG)	4‍–‍3	Leeds (ENG)	
2005	Reanne Evans (ENG)	Maria Catalano (ENG)	4‍–‍0	Walsall (ENG)	
2006	Reanne Evans (ENG)	June Banks (ENG)	4‍–‍2	Chesterfield (ENG)	
2007	Reanne Evans (ENG)	Maria Catalano (ENG)	3‍–‍1	Chesterfield (ENG)	
2008	Reanne Evans (ENG)	Maria Catalano (ENG)	3‍–‍1	Chesterfield (ENG)	
2009	Reanne Evans (ENG)	Maria Catalano (ENG)	3‍–‍0	Chesterfield (ENG)	
2010	Reanne Evans (ENG)	Maria Catalano (ENG)	3‍–‍0	Chesterfield (ENG)	
2011	Reanne Evans (ENG)	Emma Bonney (ENG)	3‍–‍2	Woking (ENG)	
2012	Maria Catalano (ENG)	Tina Owen-Sevilton (ENG)	3‍–‍0	Swindon (ENG)	
2013	Ng On-yee (HKG)	Maria Catalano (ENG)	4‍–‍2	Chesterfield (ENG)	
2015	Ng On-yee (HKG)	Reanne Evans (ENG)	5‍–‍1	Leeds (ENG)	
2016	Reanne Evans (ENG)	Tatjana Vasiljeva (LAT)	5‍–‍1	Leeds (ENG)	
2017	Ng On-yee (HKG)	Reanne Evans (ENG)	4‍–‍1	Leeds (ENG)	
2018	Ng On-yee (HKG)	Rebecca Kenna (ENG)	4‍–‍1	Leeds (ENG)	
2019	Reanne Evans (ENG)	Maria Catalano (ENG)	4‍–‍2	Leeds (ENG)	
2021	Reanne Evans (ENG)	Rebecca Kenna (ENG)	4‍–‍0	Leeds (ENG)	
2022	Reanne Evans (ENG)	Ng On-yee (HKG)	4‍–‍3	Leeds (ENG)	
2023	Reanne Evans (ENG)	Bai Yulu (CHN)	4‍–‍1	Leeds (ENG)	
2024	Bai Yulu (CHN)	Reanne Evans (ENG)	4‍–‍0	Leeds (ENG)	
2025	Bai Yulu (CHN)	Ng On-yee (HKG)	4‍–‍2	Leeds (ENG)	
2026	Bai Yulu (CHN)	Reanne Evans (ENG)	4‍–‍1	Leeds (ENG)	
