= 2021 UK Women's Snooker Championship =

Women's snooker tournament

Tournament information
- Dates: 4–5 September 2021
- Venue: Northern Snooker Centre
- City: Leeds
- Country: England
- Organisation: World Women's Snooker
- Highest break: Rebecca Kenna (ENG) (81)

Final
- Champion: Reanne Evans (ENG)
- Runner-up: Rebecca Kenna (ENG)
- Score: 4–0

The 2021 UK Women's Snooker Championship was a women's snooker tournament that took place from 4 to 5 September 2021 at the Northern Snooker Centre in Leeds, England. It was organised by World Women's Snooker.

Reanne Evans was the defending champion, having defeated Maria Catalano 4–2 in the 2019 final. Evans defeated Rebecca Kenna 4–0 in the final to retain the title. Kenna produced an 81 break in the semi-finals, the highest of the tournament.

== Format ==
The top two players were seeded through to the last-16. The remaining 34 players were drawn in seven groups, each containing four or five players. Those matches were played as the best of 3 frames. The top two players from each group qualified for the knockout stage and joined the two seeds at the last-16 round. The last-16 round and the quarter-finals were played as the best of 5 frames. The semi-finals and the final were played as the best of 7 frames.

== Knockout ==
The draw for the tournament's knockout rounds is shown below. The match winners are shown in bold.

**Last 16**; Best of 5 frames
**Reanne Evans (ENG)**	**3**
Connie Stephens (ENG)	0
**Chucky Preston (NIR)**	**3**
Jenny Poulter (ENG)	0
Mariia Shevchenko	0
**Steph Daughtery (ENG)**	**3**
Zoe Killington (ENG)	0
**Laura Evans (WAL)**	**3**
**Emma Parker (ENG)**	**3**
Kate Le Gallez (GUE)	0
**Mary Talbot (ENG)**	**3**
Shannon Metcalf (ENG)	0
**Maria Catalano (ENG)**	**3**
Harriet Haynes (ENG)	1
**Rebecca Kenna (ENG)**	**3**
Jamie Hunter (ENG)	0

**Quarter-finals**; Best of 5 frames
**Reanne Evans (ENG)**	**3**
Chucky Preston (NIR)	0
Steph Daughtery (ENG)	1
**Laura Evans (WAL)**	**3**
**Emma Parker (ENG)**	**3**
Mary Talbot (ENG)	0
Maria Catalano (ENG)	2
**Rebecca Kenna (ENG)**	**3**

**Semi-finals**; Best of 7 frames
**Reanne Evans (ENG)**	**4**
Laura Evans (WAL)	2
Emma Parker (ENG)	3
**Rebecca Kenna (ENG)**	**4**

**Final**; Best of 7 frames
**Reanne Evans (ENG)**	**4**
Rebecca Kenna (ENG)	0
