= 1983 Women's World Snooker Championship =

Women's snooker event, held May 1983

- Advertisement for the tournament from Cue World magazine, March 1983

Tournament information
- Dates: 21–28 May 1983
- Venue: Pontins Brean Sands Holiday Club
- City: Brean
- Country: England
- Organisation: World Ladies Billiards and Snooker Association
- Format: Single elimination
- Winner's share: £2,000

Final
- Champion: Sue Foster (ENG)
- Runner-up: Maureen Baynton (ENG)
- Score: 8–5

The 1983 Women's World Snooker Championship was a women's snooker tournament that took place from 21 to 28 May 1983 at Pontins Brean Sands Holiday Club, Brean. It was the 1983 edition of the World Women's Snooker Championship, first held in 1976 and was sponsored by Pontins. The tournament was won by Sue Foster, who defeated Maureen Baynton 8–5 in the final.

The top seed was Sue LeMaich. The defending champion from the previous staging of the event in 1981, Vera Selby, decided not to enter in 1983. Fourth seed Mandy Fisher was beaten by 13-year-old Stacey Hillyard in the third round. In the first semi-final, LeMaich lost the last two frames in a 5–6 defeat by Baynton. With the scores at 5–5, LeMaich missed a pot on the black and left it over a pocket, Baynton then potting the ball to win the match. In the other semi-final, Foster led Lesley McIlrath 3–0, but later found herself 4–5 behind. Foster won the next frame to level at 5–5, and took the deciding frame on the pink. Baynton led 4–3 after the first session of the final, but won only one further frame in the second session, with Foster winning 8–5. Foster received £2,000 prize money for her win, and Baynton received £1,000 as runner-up.

== Prize fund ==
- Winner: £2,000
- Runner-up: £1,000
- Semi-finals: £500
- Quarter-finals: £250
- Last 16 (fourth round): £100

== Main draw ==
Fourth round Best of 7 frames
Sue LeMaich (CAN)	4
Jennifer Poulter (ENG)	0
Allison Fisher (ENG)	4
Sheila King (CAN)	2
Maureen Baynton (ENG)	4
Angela Jones (ENG)	2
Julie Islip (ENG)	4
Stacey Hillyard (ENG)	2
Sue Foster (ENG)	4
Sheri Richardson (CAN)	3
Maryann McConnell (CAN)	4
Carol Jarvis (ENG)	1
Agnes Davies (WAL)	4
Helen Treddinick (ENG)	1
Lesley McIlrath (AUS)	4
Grace Nakamura (CAN)	1

Quarter-finals; Best of 9 frames
Sue LeMaich (CAN)	5
Allison Fisher (ENG)	1
Maureen Baynton (ENG)	5
Julie Islip (ENG)	1
Sue Foster (ENG)	5
Maryann McConnell (CAN)	1
Agnes Davies (WAL)	1
Lesley McIlrath (AUS)	5

Semi-finals; Best of 11 frames
Sue LeMaich (CAN)	5
Maureen Baynton (ENG)	6
Sue Foster (ENG)	6
Lesley McIlrath (AUS)	5

Final; Best of 15 frames
Maureen Baynton (ENG)	5
Sue Foster (ENG)	8
