= Maureen Baynton =

English snooker player (born 1937)

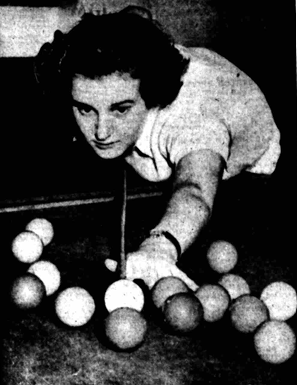
- Baynton in 1953, aged 16

Personal information
- Born: 1937 (age 88–89) England

Sport
- Country: England
- Sport: Snooker

Maureen Baynton (born Maureen Barrett in 1937) is an English former snooker and billiards player. She held the record for winning most Women's Amateur Snooker Championships after winning eight times between 1954 and 1968, and also won seven Women's Amateur Billiards championships between 1955 and 1980. She was runner-up in the 1983 World Women's Snooker Championship.

== Biography ==
Baynton began to play snooker and billiards at Peckham Health Centre, teaching herself, from the age of 11. Three years after taking up the games, she was the girls champion at both snooker and billiards.

After a highly successful playing career in which she won a record eight Women's Amateur Snooker Championships between 1954 and 1968, and seven Women's Amateur Billiards championships between 1955 and 1980, she retired from competition for several years. When the World Women's Snooker Championship was staged in 1976, Baynton entered, reaching the semi-final, where she lost to Muriel Hazeldene. In the 1983 tournament she went one stage further, reaching the final, where she lost 5–8 to Sue Foster.

Throughout her career, she used the cue that she received, aged 10, for winning the Schoolgirls Championship in 1947. It is now on display at the Billiards and Snooker Heritage Collection in Liverpool.

== Titles and achievements ==
Snooker

Outcome	No.	Year	Championship	Opponent	Score	Ref.
Winner	1	1954	Women's Amateur Snooker Championship			
Winner	2	1955	Women's Amateur Snooker Championship			
Winner	3	1956	Women's Amateur Snooker Championship			
Winner	4	1961	Women's Amateur Snooker Champion	Thea March	4–0	
Winner	5	1962	Women's Amateur Snooker Champion	Rita Holmes	4–1	
Winner	6	1964	Women's Amateur Snooker Championship			
Winner	7	1966	Women's Amateur Snooker Championship			
Winner	8	1968	Women's Amateur Snooker Championship			
Runner-up	9	1983	Women's World Snooker Championships	Sue Foster	5–8	

Billiards

Outcome	No.	Year	Championship	Opponent	Score	Ref.
Runner-up	1	1954	World Women’s Billiards Championship	Helen Futo	430–448	
Winner	2	1955	World Women’s Billiards Championship	E Morland-Smith	451–401	
Winner	3	1956	World Women’s Billiards Championship			
Winner	4	1957	World Women’s Billiards Championship	E Morland-Smith	553–334	
Winner	5	1964	World Women’s Billiards Championship	Rae Craven	649–336	
Winner	6	1966	World Women’s Billiards Championship	Vera Youle	514–319	
Winner	7	1968	World Women’s Billiards Championship	Rae Craven	434–265	
Runner-up	8	1978	World Women’s Billiards Championship	Vera Selby	319–366	
Winner	9	1979	World Women’s Billiards Championship	Vera Selby		
