= Elena Kurbakova =

Israeli snooker and pool player

Elena Kurbakova אלנה קורבקובה
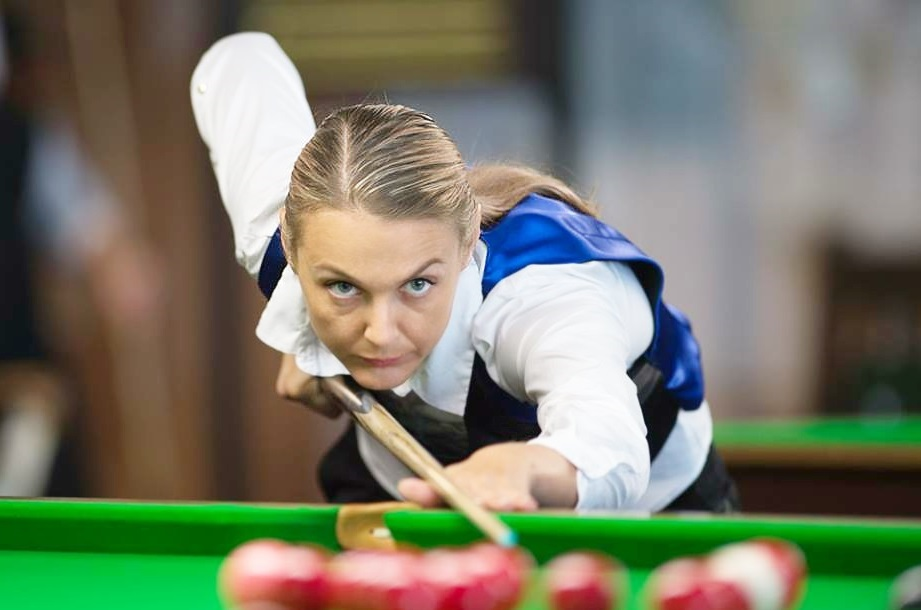

Personal information
- Born: 28 August 1982 (age 44) Crimea

Sport
- Country: Israel
- Sport: Snooker

Elena Kurbakova (Hebrew: אלנה קורבקובה; born 28 August 1982) is an Israeli snooker and pool player. She is a Women's National Snooker Champion and World Professional Billiards and Snooker Association coach.

Elena Kurbakova was born in Crimea and moved to Israel when she was 17 years old. She started playing pool in 2008 and snooker in 2012. From 2015 Kurbakova has represented Israel in international snooker championships. In July 2015 she became an official WPBSA coach.
