= Sue Foster =

English snooker player

Personal information
- Born: England

Sport
- Country: England
- Sport: Snooker

Tournament wins
- World Championship: 1983

Sue Foster is an English former snooker player. She won the Women's World Snooker Championship in 1983.

== Career ==
Foster, from Tamworth, was runner-up in the Pontins women's championships three times, in 1977, 1978 and 1982; and was national women's champion in 1980, 1982 and 1983.

The 1983 Women's World Snooker Championship was sponsored by Pontins and held at their Brean Sands Holiday Park, Burnham-on-Sea, Somerset. Foster won the tournament, and the £2,000 prize, by defeating Maureen Baynton, from Ewell, 8–5 in the final. The Observer noted that this was £28,000 less than the £30,000 that Steve Davis received for winning the men's World Snooker Championship that season.

Foster had reached the semi-final in 1981, where she lost 0–3 to Vera Selby. In 1980 she lost 0–3 to Natalie Stelmach in the quarter-final. She retired from competitive snooker in 1984.

== Achievements ==
=== Women's Snooker – Individual ===
Outcome	No.	Year	Championship	Opponent	Score	Ref.
Runner-up	1	1977	Pontins Women's Championships	Agnes Davies	1–3	
Runner-up	2	1978	Pontins Women's Championships	Ann Johnson	1–3	
Winner	3	1980	UK Women's Snooker Championships			
Winner	4	1982	UK Women's Snooker Championships			
Runner-up	5	1982	Pontins Women's Championships	Agnes Davies	0–3	
Winner	6	1983	UK Women's Snooker Championships			
Winner	7	1983	Women's World Snooker Championships	Maureen Baynton	8–5	
