= Rita Holmes =

English snooker player and dancing teacher

Personal information
- Born: c. 1934

Sport
- Country: England
- Sport: Snooker

Rita Holmes (born c. 1934) is an English retired player of the cue sports of snooker and English billiards. She won the UK Women's Amateur Snooker Championship four times: on her debut in 1953 and again in 1957, 1958 and 1963. She retired from snooker in 1964 to concentrate on her primary career of teaching dancing, but after overcoming an injury, played in the 2006 British Open.

== Biography ==
Rita Holmes was born c. 1934. Her father owned the Midland Billiard Club in Leyton, London. Holmes started playing snooker in about 1950, and seeing Rosemary Davies, who was the 1952 Women's Amateur Snooker Champion play, decided to take up the game seriously; her father arranged for snooker professional Sydney Lee to coach her. At the same time, Holmes was running the Rita Maureen School of Dance at Chingford; her previous job had been as a ledger clerk at a bank in Westcliff, but she resigned to concentrate on teaching dancing. Standing 5-foot 1 inches tall, Holmes used a cue that was four inches shorter than the standard.

After about 11 months of coaching, Holmes decided to enter the 1953 Women's Amateur Snooker Championship to gain experience. She won the tournament, defeating Maureen Barrett 4–3 in the final. The following year, she reached the final again, but this time lost 0–4 to Barrett. A match report in The Billard Player concluded that Holmes had been "too cautious and careful" in her playing approach.

Holmes regained the title in 1957. After leading Pat Ayres 3–0 at the interval, she won 4–2. The correspondent for The Billiard Player called Holmes a "worthy champion" and commended her potting, but thought she should seek to improve her potitional play and use of side. Holmes reached the championship final for ten successive years in all, with two further title, in 1958 and 1963. She then retired to competitive play, to concentrate on teaching dancing. She taught tap dancing and musical-comedy dance.

In 2006, she made a return to competition, aged 73, playing in the women's British Open. She won 3–0 against Laura Alves to reach the quarter-finals, where she was defeated 2–4 to Suzie Opacic. She had taken up playing again after successful treatment to the effects of an injury. After this, she started coaching from professional Dominic Dale, and was intending to enter the 2007 World Women's Snooker Championship, but one week before that tournament, she had a stroke that affected her eyesight and was unable to play.
