= Natalie Stelmach =

Canadian snooker player (1957/58 – 2011)

Personal information
- Born: 1957 or 1958 Sudbury, Ontario
- Died: 8 July 2011 (age 53)

Sport
- Country: Canada
- Sport: Snooker

Natalie Stelmach (1957/1958 – 8 July 2011) was a Canadian snooker player. She was runner-up in the 1984 Amateur World Women's Snooker Championship.

== Biography ==
Natalie Stelmach's father Joe, was a minor-league baseball player who later played semi-professionally in the Nickel Belt senior league in Sudbury, Ontario. Stelmach started playing snooker in 1973, at a newly established family recreation centre, when she was aged 13. The owner, Gabe Tarini, introduced Stelmach to snooker and later became her coach. At 14, she won the Canadian Women's snooker title.

At the age of 16, Stelmach was one of two Canadian entrants to the 1976 Women's World Open, held in England. She lost in her first match to Lettie Haywood.

According to an article in Maclean's magazine in April 1979, Stelmach had never lost a match to another woman in Canada. She had won the Canadian national title each of the four times that it had been staged. In April 1981, Stelmach made the first half century by a woman in competition, on the way to winning her sixth Canadian Open title. She has a claim to be the first woman to make a century break, scoring a 109 in 1977. Also in 1981, Stelmach and her playing partner Cliff Thorburn won the World Mixed Pairs Championship. They beat Vera Selby and John Virgo on total points scored, 262–239 in the final, after beating Grace Cayley and Tony Meo 267–200 in the semi-final.

Stelmach reached the final of the 1984 Women's World Amateur Snooker Championship, defeating Lynette Horsburgh 3–0, Maggie Beer 3–1, Gaye Jones 4–0 and then Caroline Walch 4–0. She lost in the final 1–4 to the 15-year-old Stacey Hillyard.

In a 1987 interview with Paul Patton for The Globe and Mail, Stelmach reflected that it was hard to promote snooker in Canada because there was not a culture of children playing the game, and added that "There is still a lot of sexism towards women playing." At that point, aged 28, she lived in Sudbury where she owed a billiard hall, Varsity Billiards.

== Titles and achievements ==
- Canadian Open Women's Champion 1976
- Canadian Open Women's Champion 1977
- Canadian Open Women's Champion 1978
- Canadian Open Women's Champion 1979
- Canadian Open Women's Champion 1980
- Canadian Open Women's Champion 1981
- 1981 World Mixed Pairs Championship (with Cliff Thorburn)
- 1984 Amateur World Women's Snooker Championship runner-up.
