= Katrina Wan =

Snooker player from Hong Kong

Personal information
- Born: 8 March 1988 (age 38) Hong Kong

Sport
- Country: Hong Kong
- Sport: Snooker
- Highest ranking: World Women's Snooker: 5
Medal record
Women's Six-red snooker
Representing Hong Kong
Asian Indoor and Martial Arts Games
Bronze medal – third place	2017 Ashgabat	Single

Katrina Wan Ka Kai (Chinese: 溫家琪; born 8 March 1988) is a snooker player from Hong Kong. She was runner-up in the 2018 Australian Women's Open.

Katrina Wan
- Traditional Chinese: 溫家琪
- Simplified Chinese: 温家琪
Transcriptions
Standard Mandarin
- Hanyu Pinyin: Wēn Jiāqí
Yue: Cantonese
- Jyutping: Wan^{1} Gaa^{1} Kei^{4}
- IPA: [wɐn˥ ka˥.kʰej˩]

== Biography ==
Wan started playing on the women's snooker circuit in 2013. She reached her highest ranking to date, 5th, in October 2018.

At the 2016 WLBS World Ladies Pairs Championship, Wan and Ng On-yee, beat Maria Catalano and Tatjana Vasiljeva 4–1.

Another doubles success for Wan was partnering Sanderson Lam to win the Festival of Women's Snooker 10-Red mixed pairs’ tournament in 2017.

Wan was runner-up at the 2018 Australian Women's Open. She topped her qualifying group by winning all five matches 3–0, then saw off Janine Rollings 3–0 in the last 16, and Jessica Woods 3–1 in the quarter final. In the semi-final, Wan beat 11-times world champion Reanne Evans 4–3. Wan won the first frame of the final against Ng On-yee, then lost the next three, before winning another to trail 2–3. On-yee then won the sixth frame to take the match 4–2.

She began the 2019–20 season ranked eighth.

== Titles and achievements ==
- 2015 UK Ladies Championship semi-finalist
- 2016 World Ladies Pairs Championship winner (with Ng On-yee)
- 2016 World Women's Snooker Championship quarter-finalist
- 2017 World Women's Snooker Championship quarter-finalist
- 2018 Women's World Snooker Championship semi-finalist
- 2017 10-Red Mixed Pairs’ Champion, with Sanderson Lam, Festival of Women's Snooker
- 2018 European Women's Masters (Challenge Cup) winner
- 2018 Australian Women's Open runner-up
