= Vera Selby =

English snooker and billiards player (1930–2023)

Vera Selby MBE
- Vera Selby

Personal information
- Born: 13 March 1930 Richmond, North Yorkshire, England
- Died: 13 March 2023 (aged 93)

Sport
- Country: England
- Sport: Snooker

Vera Selby MBE (née Danby; 13 March 1930 – 13 March 2023) was an English snooker and billiards player who won multiple women's world titles in both sports. She won the inaugural World Women's Snooker Championship in 1976 and won the title for a second time in 1981; she also won eight World Women's Billiards Championships from 1970 to 1978. A commentator for the BBC's televised snooker coverage, most notably at the 1982 World Snooker Championship, she was also a qualified referee and coach.

Remembered as a pioneering figure in women's cue sports, Selby received an MBE in the 2015 Birthday Honours for her services to snooker and billiards.

== Career ==
Selby was introduced to billiards as a six-year-old, as her uncle had a table in the cellar of his home in Newcastle. When she was 36, former British amateur billiards and snooker champion Alf Nolan saw her playing with her husband at the Coxlodge Club in Newcastle and started coaching her. She won eight World Women's Billiards Championships from 1970 to 1978.

In 1976, she became the inaugural winner of the World Women's Snooker Championship, claiming the title by beating Muriel Hazeldine 4–0 in the final. She won her second women's world snooker title in 1981 by defeating Mandy Fisher 3–0 in the final. At 51, her success made her the oldest female world champion in any sport.

A commentator for televised snooker, she was part of the BBC commentary team for the 1982 World Snooker Championship at the Crucible Theatre, at which Alex Higgins won his second world title. She was a qualified referee and coach, and chaired the North East Billiards and Snooker Association. In 1987 she became the first woman to be appointed by the Billiards and Snooker Control Council as an examiner for referees. She won a lifetime achievement award for her services to billiards in 2014.

In the 2015 Birthday Honours, she was appointed Member of the Order of the British Empire (MBE) "for services to Snooker and Billiards." She received her MBE from Prince Charles (now Charles III) at Buckingham Palace. At age 85, she was still playing cue sports regularly.

== Personal life ==
Vera Danby was born in Richmond, North Yorkshire, where her father was manager of the Freeman, Hardy and Willis shop. She studied art and design at Leeds University. In her mid-20s, she met Bruce Selby, a hairdresser from Newcastle, who was 28 years her senior. They married two years later.

She worked as a senior art, textile, and dress designer lecturer at the former Newcastle Polytechnic from 1972 until 1983, when she took early retirement aged 53.

In 2009, she became the Master of the 400-year-old Fellmongers' Guild in Richmond, the first female Master in its history.

Selby died on 13 March 2023, her 93rd birthday. Professional player Shaun Murphy paid tribute, calling her "one of the pioneers of women's snooker and an early trailblazer for girls and women who followed". An exhibition celebrating her career was held at Northumbria University in April 2023.

== Titles and achievements ==
Individual Snooker finals contested by Vera Selby
| Outcome | No. | Year | Championship | Opponent | Score | Ref. |
|---|---|---|---|---|---|---|
| Winner | 1 | 1972 | National Women's Snooker Championship | Rae Craven | 4-0 | |
| Winner | 2 | 1973 | National Women's Snooker Championship | Kay Goodwin | 4-1 | |
| Winner | 3 | 1974 | National Women's Snooker Championship | Muriel Hazeldene | 4-1 | |
| Winner | 4 | 1975 | National Women's Snooker Championship | Ann Johnson | 4-2 | |
| Winner | 5 | 1976 | Women's World Open Championship | Muriel Hazeldene | 4–0 | |
| Winner | 6 | 1979 | National Women's Snooker Championship | Ann Johnson | 3-1 | |
| Winner | 7 | 1981 | Women's World Open Championship | Mandy Fisher | 3–0 | |

Team Snooker final contested by Vera Selby
| Outcome | Year | Championship | Team/partner | Opponent(s) in the final | Score | Ref. |
|---|---|---|---|---|---|---|
| Runner-up | 1981 | World Mixed Doubles Championship | John Virgo (ENG) | Cliff Thorburn (CAN); Natalie Stelmach (CAN) | 239–269 (Note: Aggregate points across four frames) | |

Individual English Billiards finals contested by Vera Selby
| Outcome | No. | Year | Championship | Opponent | Score | Ref. |
|---|---|---|---|---|---|---|
| Winner | 1 | 1970 | Women's Amateur Billiards Championship | | | |
| Winner | 2 | 1971 | Women's Amateur Billiards Championship | Rae Craven | 506–304 | |
| Winner | 3 | 1972 | Women's Amateur Billiards Championship | Rae Craven | 736–354 | |
| Winner | 4 | 1973 | Women's Amateur Billiards Championship | Rae Craven | walkover | |
| Winner | 5 | 1974 | Women's Amateur Billiards Championship | Thea Hindmarch | | |
| Winner | 6 | 1976 (Note: There was no contest in 1975) | Women's Amateur Billiards Championship | Rae Craven | 407–157 | |
| Winner | 7 | 1977 | Women's Amateur Billiards Championship | | | |
| Winner | 8 | 1978 | Women's Amateur Billiards Championship | Maureen Baynton | 366–319 | |
| Runner-up | 9 | 1979 | Women's Amateur Billiards Championship | Maureen Baynton | | |
