= Thea Hindmarch =

Player of English billiards (1918–2001)

Dorothea Hindmarch
Personal information
- Born: 4 June 1918 Birmingham, England
- Died: 20 September 2001 (aged 83) Bromley, London, England

Sport
- Country: England
- Sport: Snooker

Dorothea Hindmarch (4 June 1918 – 20 September 2001), also known as Thea March, was an English champion player of billiards, and snooker player. She won the equivalent of the women's world billiards title three times, in 1962, 1967 and 1969.

== Biography ==
Hindmarch was born on 4 June 1918. (Note: Her age was stated as 53 at the time of the November 1971 profile in Billiards and Snooker magazine) During World War II, Hindmarch was a corporal in the Auxiliary Territorial Service, leading a small team involved in radar location in South Wales.

Hindmarch won the London and Home Counties division of the Ladies' snooker championship in 1959, and for six years consecutively from 1965 to 1970. She also won the Southern Counties championship for four consecutive years from 1966. In English Billiards, Hindmarch was five times London and Home Counties champion, including from 1967 to 1969.

Hindmarch won the Women's Billiards Championship in 1962, winning a three-hour final against Rae Craven 438–385. She won a second title five years later, in 1967, and a third in 1969, beating Vera Selby 452–409 in the final.

In the 1971–1972 season, Rae Craven and Hindmarch became the first women to enter the English Amateur Snooker championship. Hindmarch served as the Secretary of the Women's Billiards Association, and in that capacity was a member of the Billiards and Snooker Control Council.

Hindmarch worked as an Inspector of Taxes. She died in Bromley on 20 September 2001, at the age of 83.

== Career highlights ==
Outcome	No.	Year	Championship	Opponent	Score	Ref.
Winner	1	1962	World Women's Billiards Championship	Rae Craven	438–385	
Winner	2	1967	World Women's Billiards Championship	Sally Bartley	416–319	
Winner	3	1969	World Women's Billiards Championship	Vera Selby	452–409	
Runner-up	4	1974	World Women's Billiards Championship	Vera Selby		
