= Muriel Hazeldene =

English snooker and billiards player

Personal information
- Born: England

Sport
- Country: England
- Sport: Snooker

Muriel Hazeldene was an English snooker and billiards player. She was runner-up to Vera Selby in the 1976 Women's World Open snooker championship.

== Biography ==
Hazeldene won three national amateur titles in snooker and one in billiards between 1951 and 1971.

She came out of retirement from playing to participate in the 1976 Women's World Open snooker championship, having to win through a qualifying competition in Leeds to join the main draw. She produced a surprise result in the first round of the main competition by beating top seed Joyce Gardner 3–1 in the first round. She won on the black in the deciding frame against Lettie Haywood in the quarter-final, then produced another surprise by beating Maureen Baynton 3–0 in the semi-final.

In the final, she lost 0–4 to Vera Selby. The first two frames were close, with Selby winning on the pink in the first and on the black in the second. Selby then played consistently, avoiding risks, to take the concluding two frames.

== Titles and achievements ==
Snooker

Outcome	No.	Year	Championship	Opponent	Score	Ref.
Winner	1	1960	Women's Amateur Snooker Champion			
Winner	2	1970	Women's Amateur Snooker Champion			
Winner	3	1971	Women's Amateur Snooker Champion	Vera Selby	4–1	
Runner-up	4	1976	World Ladies Snooker Championship	Vera Selby	0–4	

Billiards

Outcome	No.	Year	Championship	Opponent	Score	Ref.
Winner	1	1960	Women's Amateur Billiards Champion	Rae Craven	339–324	
