= 1976 Women's World Open (snooker) =

Embassy Women's World Open
Tournament information
- Dates: 7–9 April 1976
- Venue: Middlesbrough Town Hall
- City: Middlesbrough
- Country: United Kingdom
- Organisation: Women's Billiards Association
- Format: Single elimination
- Total prize fund: £1030
- Winner's share: £500 (plus a Jaeger-LeCoultre watch worth £500)

Final
- Champion: (England) Vera Selby
- Runner-up: (England) Muriel Hazeldene
- Score: 4–0

The 1976 Women's World Open was a women's snooker tournament that took place in Middlesbrough in 1976. Vera Selby won the final 4–0 against Muriel Hazeldene.

== Background and Tournament summary ==
The tournament was sponsored by Embassy and run together with the men's 1976 World Snooker Championship.

The top seed, was Joyce Gardner, the only professional player. Gardner had been three times runner-up in the Women's Professional Snooker Championship from 1934 to 1937; and seven times Women's Professional Billiards Champion from 1930 to 1938. She lost in her first match to eventual runner-up Muriel Hazeldene.

The Second seed was Vera Selby, who had won the UK national amateur snooker title for the previous four seasons, and had held the corresponding billiards title since 1970.

Other competitors included the past amateur champions Maureen Baynton and Rosemary De Lasso (née Davies), who both came out of retirement; Marion Westaway from Australia; and two players from Canada, 16-year-old Canadian champion Natalie Stelmach, and Sheila King.

Selby lost only one frame on the way to winning the title.

== Knockout ==
Players listed in bold indicate match winner.

Last 16; Best of 5 frames
(England) Joyce Gardner	1
(England) **Muriel Hazeldene**	**3**
(Wales) **Lettie Haywood**	**3**
(Canada) Natalie Stelmach	1
(England) Rosemary De Lasso	1
(Australia) **Marion Westaway**	**3**
(England) **Maureen Baynton**	**3**
(England) Hilary Reid	1
(England) **Ann Johnson**	**3**
(Republic of Ireland) Gloria Ruane	0
(England) **May Smith**	**3**
(Republic of Ireland) Anne Jones	1
(England) **Ray Craven**	**3**
(Canada) Sheila King	0
(England) **Vera Selby**	**3**
(England) Lorraine Jackson	0

Quarter-finals; Best of 5 frames
(England) **Muriel Hazeldene**	**3**
(Wales) Lettie Haywood	2
(Australia) Marion Westaway	0
(England) **Maureen Baynton**	**3**
(England) **Ann Johnson**	**3**
(England) May Smith	0
(England) Ray Craven	0
(England) **Vera Selby**	**3**

Semi-finals; Best of 5 frames
(England) **Muriel Hazeldene**	**3**
(England) Maureen Baynton	0
(England) Ann Johnson	1
(England) **Vera Selby**	**3**

Final; Best of 7 frames
(England) Muriel Hazeldene	**0**
(England) **Vera Selby**	**4**
