= Suzie Terry =

English snooker player

Sport
- Country: England
- Sport: Snooker
- Highest ranking: 5

Suzie Terry (née Opacic) is an English snooker player from Eastleigh. Winner of the 2006 World Ladies Junior Championship, she has twice reached the semi-finals of both the UK Women's Championship and the British Women's Open, and is a two-time runner-up (with Laura Evans) at the World Women's Pairs Championship.

== Biography ==
Opacic started playing snooker at the age of eight, after watching it on television. She was playing on full-sized tables by the age of nine.

She joined the women's snooker circuit in 2006. She won the World Ladies Junior Championship in the same year, and by 2009 had reached four semi-finals, the UK Women's Championship in 2006 and 2007 and the British Women's Open in 2007 and 2009. She attended Bournemouth University, studying geography. In 2006, she was unable to represent her league team Pot Black against Netley Central social club, as club rules excluded female players. Eight months later, the club overturned its ban on female players.

She took four-year break from competition while studying for a master's degree, but also from disillusionment with the reduced number of tournaments and players. She returned to competitive snooker in 2015.

With her playing partner Laura Evans, Opacic was runner-up in the World Women's Pairs Championship in both 2017 and 2018.

She works as a planning manager. She was a town planner in Heathrow Airport's Expansion team, working on obtaining planning approvals for the proposed new runway and related developments.

== Titles and achievements ==
- 2006 World Ladies Junior Championship winner
- 2006 UK Women's Championship semi-finalist
- 2007 UK Women's Championship semi-finalist
- 2007 Ladies British Open semi-finalist
- 2009 Ladies British Open semi-finalist
- 2016 Connie Gough Trophy semi-finalist
- 2017 LITEtask World Women's 10-Red Championship semi-finalist
- 2017 Women's Pairs Championship runner-up (with Laura Evans)
- 2018 Eden Women's Masters semi-finalist
- 2018 Women's Pairs Championship runner-up (with Laura Evans)
