= Laura Evans (snooker player) =

Welsh snooker player

Personal information
- Born: 1986 (age 39–40)

Sport
- Country: Wales
- Sport: Snooker
- Highest ranking: 4

Laura Evans (born 1986) is a Welsh snooker player. She has been Welsh Ladies' snooker champion three times, and was runner-up in the 2015 Eden Ladies Masters and the 2017 World Women's 10-Red Championship.

== Biography ==
Evans started playing snooker aged 14. She started entering women's tournaments in Wales, and won her first event at 15. The following year, with a practice routine of playing around six hours a day, she started entering world ladies snooker events. Evans won Welsh Ladies Championship in three consecutive years. She stopped playing on the women's snooker circuit in 2003, following the effect of the tobacco sponsorship ban on the game. In 2014 she started playing again, at Star Snooker Club in Skewen. In 2015 entered the Eden Masters, and defeated reigning world champion Ng On-yee on the way to reaching her first ranking event final.

Evans and her playing partner Suzie Opacic were runners-up in the Women's Pairs Championship in both 2017 and 2018.

In 2019. Evans and Wendy Jans of Belgium were the "Rest of the World" team at the 2019 Women's Snooker World Cup. They won all three of their group stage matches but then lost in the quarter final to the "England A" team of Reanne Evans and Rebecca Kenna.

Evans' main career is as a support worker for women with mental health problems.

== Titles and achievements ==
Outcome	No.	Year	Championship	Opponent	Score	Ref.
Semi-finalist	1	2003	Scottish Open (Plate)	Candide Binon	1–2	
Semi-finalist	2	2003	World Ladies Snooker Championship (Plate)	Val Finnie	0–2	
Semi-finalist	3	2006	East Anglian Championship	June Banks	0–4	
Semi-finalist	4	2013	UK Ladies Championship (Plate)	Hannah Jones	0–2	
Runner-up	5	2014	Southern Classic (Plate)	Hannah Jones	0–2	
Winner	6	2014	Connie Gough Memorial (Plate)	Man Yan So	2–0	
Runner-up	7	2015	Eden Ladies Masters	Reanne Evans	0–5	
Semi-finalist	8	2016	Eden Classic	Reanne Evans	1–4	
Semi-finalist	9	2016	LITEtask UK Ladies Championship	Tatjana Vasiljeva	1–4	
Semi-finalist	10	2017	Eden Women's Masters	Rebecca Kenna	0–4	
Semi-finalist	11	2017	Connie Gough Trophy	Maria Catalano	1–3	
Runner-up	12	2017	LITEtask World Women's 10-Red Championship	Ng On-yee	2–4	
Semi-finalist	13	2018	World Women's 10-Red Championship	Ng On-yee	1–3	
Winner	14	2019	World Women's 10-Red Championship (Challenge Cup)	Suzie Opacic	2–1	
Semi-finalist	15	2019	UK Women's Snooker Championship	Reanne Evans	0–4	
