= Aerobic gymnastics at the Asian Indoor Games =

Aerobic gymnastics was contested at the three editions (2005, 2007, and 2009,) of the defunct Asian Indoor Games.

== Medal table ==
Rank	Nation	Gold	Silver	Bronze	Total
1	China	11	0	0	11
2	Vietnam	1	1	1	3
3	South Korea	0	6	1	7
4	Thailand	0	4	6	10
5	Japan	0	1	4	5
Totals (5 entries)		12	12	12	36
