= Xiangqi at the 2009 Asian Indoor Games =

- Venue: Hạ Long Pearl Hotel
- Dates: 3–7 November 2009

Xiangqi at the 2009 Asian Indoor Games was held in Vietnam from 3 November to 7 November 2009. All events held in Hạ Long Pearl Hotel. There were four events in original program but both women's events were cancelled due to lack of entries.

== Medalists ==
Event	Gold	Silver	Bronze
Men's individual rapid	Wang Bin; China	Xie Jing; China	Chan Chun Kit; Hong Kong
Men's team standard	China; Xu Yinchuan; Wang Bin; Xie Jing; Shen Peng	Vietnam; Nguyễn Thành Bảo; Lại Lý Huynh; Nguyễn Trần Đỗ Ninh; Nguyễn Vũ Quân	Hong Kong; Chan Chun Kit; Chiu Yu Kuen; Leung Tat Man; Wong Chi Keung

== Medal table ==
Rank	Nation	Gold	Silver	Bronze	Total
1	China (CHN)	2	1	0	3
2	Vietnam (VIE)	0	1	0	1
3	Hong Kong (HKG)	0	0	2	2
Totals (3 entries)		2	2	2	6

== Results ==
=== Men's individual rapid ===
6–7 November

Rank	Athlete	R1	R2	R3	R4	R5	R6	R7	MP	GP
1st place, gold medalist(s)	Wang Bin (CHN)	VIE1; 1–1	JPN2; 2–0	SIN1; 1–1	MAC1; 1½–½	HKG2; 1½–½	CHN2; 1–1	VIE2; 2–0	5½	10
2nd place, silver medalist(s)	Xie Jing (CHN)	VIE2; 1½–½	SIN1; 1–1	VIE1; 1–1	MAC2; 2–0	HKG1; 1½–½	CHN1; 1–1	HKG2; 1½–½	5½	9½
3rd place, bronze medalist(s)	Chan Chun Kit (HKG)	JPN1; 2–0	HKG2; 1½–½	MAC1; 1½–½	SIN1; 1–1	CHN2 ½–1½	VIE1; 1–1	MAC2; 2–0	5	9½
4	Nguyễn Thành Bảo (VIE)	CHN1; 1–1	VIE2; 1–1	CHN2; 1–1	CAM1; 2–0	SIN1; 1–1	HKG1; 1–1	SIN2; 1½–½	4½	8½
5	Nguyễn Trần Đỗ Ninh (VIE)	CHN2 ½–1½	VIE1; 1–1	SIN2; 1–1	CAM2; 2–0	MAC1; 2–0	SIN1; 1½–½	CHN1; 0–2	4	8
6	Alvin Woo (SIN)	CAM2; 2–0	CHN2; 1–1	CHN1; 1–1	HKG1; 1–1	VIE1; 1–1	VIE2 ½–1½	JPN1; 1½–½	4	8
7	Lei Kam Fun (MAC)	SIN2; 2–0	CAM1; 1½–½	HKG1 ½–1½	CHN1 ½–1½	VIE2; 0–2	CAM2; 1½–½	JPN2; 2–0	4	8
8	Chiu Yu Kuen (HKG)	MAC2; 2–0	HKG1 ½–1½	CAM1; 1–1	JPN1; 2–0	CHN1 ½–1½	SIN2; 1½–½	CHN2 ½–1½	3½	8
9	Kim Pann (CAM)	JPN2; 2–0	MAC1 ½–1½	HKG2; 1–1	VIE1; 0–2	MAC2; 1–1	JPN1; 1–1	CAM2; 2–0	3½	7½
10	Cheang Pak Veng (MAC)	HKG2; 0–2	SIN2; 1½–½	CAM2; 1½–½	CHN2; 0–2	CAM1; 1–1	JPN2; 2–0	HKG1; 0–2	3½	6
11	Kng Ter Yong (SIN)	MAC1; 0–2	MAC2 ½–1½	VIE2; 1–1	JPN2; 2–0	JPN1; 2–0	HKG2 ½–1½	VIE1 ½–1½	2½	6½
12	Lay Chhay (CAM)	SIN1; 0–2	JPN1; 2–0	MAC2 ½–1½	VIE2; 0–2	JPN2; 2–0	MAC1 ½–1½	CAM1; 0–2	2	5
13	Kazuharu Shoshi (JPN)	HKG1; 0–2	CAM2; 0–2	JPN2; 2–0	HKG2; 0–2	SIN2; 0–2	CAM1; 1–1	SIN1 ½–1½	1½	3½
14	Toshihiko Sone (JPN)	CAM1; 0–2	CHN1; 0–2	JPN1; 0–2	SIN2; 0–2	CAM2; 0–2	MAC2; 0–2	MAC1; 0–2	0	0

=== Men's team standard ===
3–5 November

Pos	Team	Pld	W	D	L	MP	GP	CHN	VIE	HKG	MAC	CAM	JPN
1	China	5	5	0	0	10	12	—	2½–½	2–1	2½–½	2½–½	2½–½
2	Vietnam	5	4	0	1	8	12	½–2½	—	3–0	2½–½	3–0	3–0
3	Hong Kong	5	3	0	2	6	10	1–2	0–3	—	3–0	3–0	3–0
4	Macau	5	2	0	3	4	6	½–2½	½–2½	0–3	—	2–1	3–0
5	Cambodia	5	1	0	4	2	3½	½–2½	0–3	0–3	1–2	—	2–1
6	Japan	5	0	0	5	0	1½	½–2½	0–3	0–3	0–3	1–2	—

Source: Vietnam Chess
