= Dancesport at the 2009 Asian Indoor Games =

- Venue: Quần Ngựa Sports Palace
- Dates: 6–7 November 2009

Dancesport at the 2009 Asian Indoor Games was held at Quan Ngua Sports Palace, Hanoi, Vietnam from 6 November to 7 November 2009.

== Medalists ==
=== Standard ===
Event	Gold	Silver	Bronze
Quickstep	Japan; Masayuki Ishihara; Ayami Kubo	South Korea; Lee Sang-min; Kim Hye-in	Vietnam; Nguyễn Hải Anh; Nguyễn Trọng Nhã Uyên
Slow foxtrot	China; Wu Zhian; Zheng Cen	South Korea; Nam Sang-wung; Song Yi-na	Japan; Tsuyoshi Nukina; Mariko Shibahara
Tango	China; Shen Hong; Liang Yujie	Vietnam; Nguyễn Hải Anh; Nguyễn Trọng Nhã Uyên	Chinese Taipei; Chao Chun-lun; Kao Chia-lin
Viennese waltz	China; Shen Hong; Liang Yujie	South Korea; Lee Sang-min; Kim Hye-in	Kazakhstan; Yevgeniy Plokhikh; Yelena Klyuchnikova
Waltz	Japan; Masayuki Ishihara; Ayami Kubo	China; Wu Zhian; Zheng Cen	South Korea; Nam Sang-wung; Song Yi-na

=== Latin ===
Event	Gold	Silver	Bronze
Cha-cha-cha	Japan; Yumiya Kubota; Rara Kubota	China; Shao Keqiang; Yang Na	South Korea; Jung Jae-ho; Yoon So-yeon
Jive	Vietnam; Nguyễn Đoàn Minh Trường; Nguyễn Hồng Thi	Japan; Yumiya Kubota; Rara Kubota	China; Shao Keqiang; Yang Na
Paso doble	China; Shi Lei; Zhang Baiyu	Japan; Ginga Morita; Aiko Kowada	South Korea; Kim Sung-min; Kim Mi-sun
Rumba	Vietnam; Nguyễn Đoàn Minh Trường; Nguyễn Hồng Thi	Thailand; Watcharakorn Suasuebpun; Warapa Jumbala	Kyrgyzstan; Aleksei Kibkalo; Viktoriya Kachalko
Samba	China; Shi Lei; Zhang Baiyu	South Korea; Jung Jae-ho; Yoon So-yeon	Japan; Ginga Morita; Aiko Kowada

== Medal table ==
Rank	Nation	Gold	Silver	Bronze	Total
1	China (CHN)	5	2	1	8
2	Japan (JPN)	3	2	2	7
3	Vietnam (VIE)	2	1	1	4
4	South Korea (KOR)	0	4	3	7
5	Thailand (THA)	0	1	0	1
6	Chinese Taipei (TPE)	0	0	1	1
6	Kazakhstan (KAZ)	0	0	1	1
6	Kyrgyzstan (KGZ)	0	0	1	1
Totals (8 entries)		10	10	10	30

== Results ==
=== Standard ===
==== Quickstep ====
7 November

===== Semifinals =====
Rank	Team	Score
1	Chao Chun-lun / Kao Chia-lin (TPE)	7
1	Ieong Su Kan / Wong Sut Kuai (MAC)	7
1	Lee Sang-min / Kim Hye-in (KOR)	7
1	Masayuki Ishihara / Ayami Kubo (JPN)	7
1	Tri Mulyana / Trisnawati (INA)	7
1	Nguyễn Hải Anh / Nguyễn Trọng Nhã Uyên (VIE)	7
7	Leonid Kuznetsov / Anastasiia Chigerina (KGZ)	0

===== Final =====
Rank	Team	Places					
Rank	Team	1	1–2	1–3	1–4	1–5	1–6
1st place, gold medalist(s)	Masayuki Ishihara / Ayami Kubo (JPN)	5					
2nd place, silver medalist(s)	Lee Sang-min / Kim Hye-in (KOR)	0	5				
3rd place, bronze medalist(s)	Nguyễn Hải Anh / Nguyễn Trọng Nhã Uyên (VIE)	2	3	6			
4	Chao Chun-lun / Kao Chia-lin (TPE)	0	0	2	7		
5	Ieong Su Kan / Wong Sut Kuai (MAC)	0	0	0	0	5	
6	Tri Mulyana / Trisnawati (INA)	0	0	0	0	2	7

==== Slow foxtrot ====
6 November

===== Semifinals =====
Rank	Team	Score
1	Tsuyoshi Nukina / Mariko Shibahara (JPN)	7
1	Wu Zhian / Zheng Cen (CHN)	7
1	Yevgeniy Plokhikh / Yelena Klyuchnikova (KAZ)	7
1	Nam Sang-wung / Song Yi-na (KOR)	7
5	Yeh Chia-lin / Sun Chi (TPE)	5
6	Pawatpong Racha-apai / Thitiyapa Potimu (THA)	4
7	Georgy Tretyakov / Alyona Sentyabreva (UZB)	2
7	Dương Văn Minh / Đinh Thị Khánh Chi (VIE)	2
9	Tri Mulyana / Trisnawati (INA)	1
10	Kelvin Lam / Christine Chan (HKG)	0
10	Johnston Lim / Nicole Tan (MAS)	0

===== Final =====
Rank	Team	Places					
Rank	Team	1	1–2	1–3	1–4	1–5	1–6
1st place, gold medalist(s)	Wu Zhian / Zheng Cen (CHN)	6					
2nd place, silver medalist(s)	Nam Sang-wung / Song Yi-na (KOR)	1	6				
3rd place, bronze medalist(s)	Tsuyoshi Nukina / Mariko Shibahara (JPN)	0	1	5			
4	Yeh Chia-lin / Sun Chi (TPE)	0	0	0	3	6	
5	Yevgeniy Plokhikh / Yelena Klyuchnikova (KAZ)	0	0	2	3	4	
6	Pawatpong Racha-apai / Thitiyapa Potimu (THA)	0	0	0	1	4	

==== Tango ====
7 November

===== Semifinals =====
Rank	Team	Score
1	Shen Hong / Liang Yujie (CHN)	7
1	Chao Chun-lun / Kao Chia-lin (TPE)	7
1	Apichai Promboon / Pakaorn Kuituan (THA)	7
1	Nguyễn Hải Anh / Nguyễn Trọng Nhã Uyên (VIE)	7
5	Almat Kambarov / Aktoty Zhappasbayeva (KAZ)	5
6	Kelvin Lam / Christine Chan (HKG)	4
7	Izzat Rajabov / Zoya Boldova (UZB)	2
7	Nico Darmawan / Yovita Earlene (INA)	2
9	Dương Văn Minh / Đinh Thị Khánh Chi (VIE)	1
10	Ieong Su Kan / Wong Sut Kuai (MAC)	0

===== Final =====
Rank	Team	Places					
Rank	Team	1	1–2	1–3	1–4	1–5	1–6
1st place, gold medalist(s)	Shen Hong / Liang Yujie (CHN)	5					
2nd place, silver medalist(s)	Nguyễn Hải Anh / Nguyễn Trọng Nhã Uyên (VIE)	2	4				
3rd place, bronze medalist(s)	Chao Chun-lun / Kao Chia-lin (TPE)	0	2	5			
4	Apichai Promboon / Pakaorn Kuituan (THA)	0	1	2	4		
5	Kelvin Lam / Christine Chan (HKG)	0	0	0	1	5	
6	Almat Kambarov / Aktoty Zhappasbayeva (KAZ)	0	0	1	2	3	7

==== Viennese waltz ====
6 November

===== Semifinals =====
Rank	Team	Score
1	Shen Hong / Liang Yujie (CHN)	7
1	Lee Sang-min / Kim Hye-in (KOR)	7
1	Yeh Chia-lin / Sun Chi (TPE)	7
1	Phan Hồng Việt / Hoàng Thu Trang (VIE)	7
5	Yevgeniy Plokhikh / Yelena Klyuchnikova (KAZ)	4
5	Tsuyoshi Nukina / Mariko Shibahara (JPN)	4
5	Pawatpong Racha-apai / Thitiyapa Potimu (THA)	4
8	Kelvin Toh / Tiara Zhang (SIN)	2
9	Anthony Chua / Anita Tan (MAS)	0

===== Final =====
Rank	Team	Places						
Rank	Team	1	1–2	1–3	1–4	1–5	1–6	1–7
1st place, gold medalist(s)	Shen Hong / Liang Yujie (CHN)	5						
2nd place, silver medalist(s)	Lee Sang-min / Kim Hye-in (KOR)	1	3	5				
3rd place, bronze medalist(s)	Yevgeniy Plokhikh / Yelena Klyuchnikova (KAZ)	1	2	5				
4	Tsuyoshi Nukina / Mariko Shibahara (JPN)	0	3	4				
5	Yeh Chia-lin / Sun Chi (TPE)	0	0	0	2	7		
6	Phan Hồng Việt / Hoàng Thu Trang (VIE)	0	0	0	1	1	4	
7	Pawatpong Racha-apai / Thitiyapa Potimu (THA)	0	0	1	1	1	3	7

==== Waltz ====
7 November

===== Semifinals =====
Rank	Team	Score
1	Wu Zhian / Zheng Cen (CHN)	7
1	Nam Sang-wung / Song Yi-na (KOR)	7
1	Masayuki Ishihara / Ayami Kubo (JPN)	7
1	Phan Hồng Việt / Hoàng Thu Trang (VIE)	7
5	Apichai Promboon / Pakaorn Kuituan (THA)	6
6	Almat Kambarov / Aktoty Zhappasbayeva (KAZ)	5
7	Kelvin Toh / Tiara Zhang (SIN)	2
8	Nico Darmawan / Yovita Earlene (INA)	1
9	Leonid Kuznetsov / Anastasiia Chigerina (KGZ)	0
9	Anthony Chua / Anita Tan (MAS)	0

===== Final =====
Rank	Team	Places					
Rank	Team	1	1–2	1–3	1–4	1–5	1–6
1st place, gold medalist(s)	Masayuki Ishihara / Ayami Kubo (JPN)	6					
2nd place, silver medalist(s)	Wu Zhian / Zheng Cen (CHN)	1	6				
3rd place, bronze medalist(s)	Nam Sang-wung / Song Yi-na (KOR)	0	1	7			
4	Apichai Promboon / Pakaorn Kuituan (THA)	0	0	0	5		
5	Almat Kambarov / Aktoty Zhappasbayeva (KAZ)	0	0	0	2	6	
6	Phan Hồng Việt / Hoàng Thu Trang (VIE)	0	0	0	0	1	7

=== Latin ===
==== Cha-cha-cha ====
7 November

===== Semifinals =====
Rank	Team	Score
1	Shao Keqiang / Yang Na (CHN)	7
1	Yumiya Kubota / Rara Kubota (JPN)	7
3	Peng Yen-ming / Chi Hsin-chi (TPE)	6
3	Jung Jae-ho / Yoon So-yeon (KOR)	6
5	Akhmet Kalmatayev / Khristina Ivolgina (KAZ)	5
5	Ngô Minh Đức / Cao Thị Vân Diễm (VIE)	5
5	Theerawut Thommuangpak / Phuthinat Khanitnusorn (THA)	5
8	Mihail Kamarda / Valeriya Kachalko (KGZ)	1
9	Fong Wai Kin / U Mei Kok (MAC)	0
9	Maarouf Diwaneh / Nevine Gebara (SYR)	0
9	Robby Tanser / Anita Tandy (INA)	0
9	Diego Pereira / Reesha Dhulap (IND)	0

===== Final =====
Rank	Team	Places						
Rank	Team	1	1–2	1–3	1–4	1–5	1–6	1–7
1st place, gold medalist(s)	Yumiya Kubota / Rara Kubota (JPN)	3	4					
2nd place, silver medalist(s)	Shao Keqiang / Yang Na (CHN)	2	4					
3rd place, bronze medalist(s)	Jung Jae-ho / Yoon So-yeon (KOR)	1	1	3	5			
4	Akhmet Kalmatayev / Khristina Ivolgina (KAZ)	0	3	3	4			
5	Peng Yen-ming / Chi Hsin-chi (TPE)	1	1	2	3	4		
6	Ngô Minh Đức / Cao Thị Vân Diễm (VIE)	0	1	1	2	3	5	
7	Theerawut Thommuangpak / Phuthinat Khanitnusorn (THA)	0	0	0	2	2	4	

==== Jive ====
6 November

===== Semifinals =====
Rank	Team	Score
1	Nguyễn Đoàn Minh Trường / Nguyễn Hồng Thi (VIE)	7
1	Yang Kuang-chen / Ma Li-ann (TPE)	7
3	Shao Keqiang / Yang Na (CHN)	6
3	Yumiya Kubota / Rara Kubota (JPN)	6
3	Ng Sum Chun / Lam Wai Yi (HKG)	6
6	Fong Wai Kin / U Mei Kok (MAC)	4
7	Askhat Urazalinov / Milena Sementsova (KAZ)	3
7	Albert Yuwono / Yohanna Octoria (INA)	3
9	Sng Li Wei / Tan Wei Jing (SIN)	0
9	Maarouf Diwaneh / Nevine Gebara (SYR)	0

===== Final =====
Rank	Team	Places					
Rank	Team	1	1–2	1–3	1–4	1–5	1–6
1st place, gold medalist(s)	Nguyễn Đoàn Minh Trường / Nguyễn Hồng Thi (VIE)	4					
2nd place, silver medalist(s)	Yumiya Kubota / Rara Kubota (JPN)	3	6				
3rd place, bronze medalist(s)	Shao Keqiang / Yang Na (CHN)	0	1	4			
4	Yang Kuang-chen / Ma Li-ann (TPE)	0	0	3	5		
5	Ng Sum Chun / Lam Wai Yi (HKG)	0	0	1	2	5	
6	Fong Wai Kin / U Mei Kok (MAC)	0	0	0	1	3	7

==== Paso doble ====
6 November

===== Semifinals =====
Rank	Team	Score
1	Shi Lei / Zhang Baiyu (CHN)	7
1	Kim Sung-min / Kim Mi-sun (KOR)	7
3	Watcharakorn Suasuebpun / Warapa Jumbala (THA)	6
3	Aleksei Kibkalo / Viktoriya Kachalko (KGZ)	6
3	Đinh Ngọc Tú / Đặng Thu Hương (VIE)	6
6	Ginga Morita / Aiko Kowada (JPN)	5
7	Yang Kuang-chen / Ma Li-ann (TPE)	3
8	Alfred Choo / Carmen Choo (MAS)	2
9	Sng Li Wei / Tan Wei Jing (SIN)	0
9	Albert Yuwono / Yohanna Octoria (INA)	0

===== Final =====
Rank	Team	Places					
Rank	Team	1	1–2	1–3	1–4	1–5	1–6
1st place, gold medalist(s)	Shi Lei / Zhang Baiyu (CHN)	4					
2nd place, silver medalist(s)	Ginga Morita / Aiko Kowada (JPN)	1	5				
3rd place, bronze medalist(s)	Kim Sung-min / Kim Mi-sun (KOR)	2	3	5			
4	Watcharakorn Suasuebpun / Warapa Jumbala (THA)	0	1	5			
5	Aleksei Kibkalo / Viktoriya Kachalko (KGZ)	0	0	0	3	7	
6	Đinh Ngọc Tú / Đặng Thu Hương (VIE)	0	0	0	0	1	7

==== Rumba ====
7 November

===== Semifinals =====
Rank	Team	Score
1	Watcharakorn Suasuebpun / Warapa Jumbala (THA)	7
1	Aleksei Kibkalo / Viktoriya Kachalko (KGZ)	7
1	Nguyễn Đoàn Minh Trường / Nguyễn Hồng Thi (VIE)	7
4	Peng Yen-ming / Chi Hsin-chi (TPE)	6
4	Kim Sung-min / Kim Mi-sun (KOR)	6
6	Ngô Minh Đức / Cao Thị Vân Diễm (VIE)	4
7	Dickson Zhou / Michelle Loi (MAC)	2
7	Askhat Urazalinov / Milena Sementsova (KAZ)	2
9	Izzat Rajabov / Zoya Boldova (UZB)	1
10	Johnston Lim / Nicole Tan (MAS)	0
10	Abdo Dalloul / Aline Srouji (SYR)	0
10	Robby Tanser / Anita Tandy (INA)	0
10	Diego Pereira / Reesha Dhulap (IND)	0

===== Final =====
Rank	Team	Places					
Rank	Team	1	1–2	1–3	1–4	1–5	1–6
1st place, gold medalist(s)	Nguyễn Đoàn Minh Trường / Nguyễn Hồng Thi (VIE)	4					
2nd place, silver medalist(s)	Watcharakorn Suasuebpun / Warapa Jumbala (THA)	1	2	6			
3rd place, bronze medalist(s)	Aleksei Kibkalo / Viktoriya Kachalko (KGZ)	2	3	3	4		
4	Kim Sung-min / Kim Mi-sun (KOR)	0	2	2	4		
5	Peng Yen-ming / Chi Hsin-chi (TPE)	0	0	2	4		
6	Ngô Minh Đức / Cao Thị Vân Diễm (VIE)	0	1	1	2	3	7

==== Samba ====
6 November

===== Semifinals =====
Rank	Team	Score
1	Jung Jae-ho / Yoon So-yeon (KOR)	6
1	Mihail Kamarda / Valeriya Kachalko (KGZ)	6
1	Đinh Ngọc Tú / Đặng Thu Hương (VIE)	6
1	Ginga Morita / Aiko Kowada (JPN)	6
5	Shi Lei / Zhang Baiyu (CHN)	5
5	Theerawut Thommuangpak / Phuthinat Khanitnusorn (THA)	5
7	Akhmet Kalmatayev / Khristina Ivolgina (KAZ)	3
8	Ng Sum Chun / Lam Wai Yi (HKG)	2
8	Alfred Choo / Carmen Choo (MAS)	2
10	Georgy Tretyakov / Alyona Sentyabreva (UZB)	1
11	Dickson Zhou / Michelle Loi (MAC)	0
11	Abdo Dalloul / Aline Srouji (SYR)	0

===== Final =====
Rank	Team	Places					
Rank	Team	1	1–2	1–3	1–4	1–5	1–6
1st place, gold medalist(s)	Shi Lei / Zhang Baiyu (CHN)	5					
2nd place, silver medalist(s)	Jung Jae-ho / Yoon So-yeon (KOR)	1	4				
3rd place, bronze medalist(s)	Ginga Morita / Aiko Kowada (JPN)	0	2	3	5		
4	Mihail Kamarda / Valeriya Kachalko (KGZ)	1	1	2	4		
5	Đinh Ngọc Tú / Đặng Thu Hương (VIE)	0	0	2	4		
6	Theerawut Thommuangpak / Phuthinat Khanitnusorn (THA)	0	0	1	2	4	
