= Chess at the 2009 Asian Indoor Games =

- Venue: Quảng Ninh Gymnasium
- Dates: 31 October – 7 November 2009

Chess at the 2009 Asian Indoor Games was held in Vietnam from 31 October to 7 November 2009. All chess events held in Quảng Ninh Gymnasium.

== Medalists ==
Event	Gold	Silver	Bronze
Men's individual rapid	Bu Xiangzhi; China	Wang Hao; China	Murtas Kazhgaleyev; Kazakhstan
Men's individual rapid	Bu Xiangzhi; China	Wang Hao; China	Krishnan Sasikiran; India
Women's individual rapid	Hou Yifan; China	Zhu Chen; Qatar	Harika Dronavalli; India
Women's individual rapid	Hou Yifan; China	Zhu Chen; Qatar	Zhao Xue; China
Mixed team blitz	Vietnam; Lê Quang Liêm; Nguyễn Ngọc Trường Sơn; Đào Thiên Hải; Hoàng Thị Bảo Trâm; Phạm Lê Thảo Nguyên; Hoàng Thị Như Ý	China; Ni Hua; Zhou Jianchao; Ding Liren; Ju Wenjun; Tan Zhongyi; Huang Qian	India; Pentala Harikrishna; Rajaram Laxman; Krishnan Sasikiran; Tania Sachdev; Harika Dronavalli; Eesha Karavade
Mixed team blitz	Vietnam; Lê Quang Liêm; Nguyễn Ngọc Trường Sơn; Đào Thiên Hải; Hoàng Thị Bảo Trâm; Phạm Lê Thảo Nguyên; Hoàng Thị Như Ý	China; Ni Hua; Zhou Jianchao; Ding Liren; Ju Wenjun; Tan Zhongyi; Huang Qian	Iran; Ehsan Ghaemmaghami; Elshan Moradi; Morteza Mahjoub; Atousa Pourkashian; Shadi Paridar; Shayesteh Ghaderpour
Mixed team rapid	China; Bu Xiangzhi; Ni Hua; Wang Hao; Hou Yifan; Zhao Xue; Shen Yang	Vietnam; Lê Quang Liêm; Đào Thiên Hải; Nguyễn Anh Dũng; Hoàng Thị Bảo Trâm; Phạm Lê Thảo Nguyên; Lê Thanh Tú	India; Pentala Harikrishna; Parimarjan Negi; Krishnan Sasikiran; Harika Dronavalli; Tania Sachdev; Eesha Karavade
Mixed team rapid	China; Bu Xiangzhi; Ni Hua; Wang Hao; Hou Yifan; Zhao Xue; Shen Yang	Vietnam; Lê Quang Liêm; Đào Thiên Hải; Nguyễn Anh Dũng; Hoàng Thị Bảo Trâm; Phạm Lê Thảo Nguyên; Lê Thanh Tú	Uzbekistan; Anton Filippov; Dzhurabek Khamrakulov; Nafisa Muminova; Nodira Nodirjanova; Olga Sabirova

== Medal table ==
Rank	Nation	Gold	Silver	Bronze	Total
1	China (CHN)	3	2	1	6
2	Vietnam (VIE)	1	1	0	2
3	Qatar (QAT)	0	1	0	1
4	India (IND)	0	0	4	4
5	Iran (IRI)	0	0	1	1
5	Kazakhstan (KAZ)	0	0	1	1
5	Uzbekistan (UZB)	0	0	1	1
Totals (7 entries)		4	4	8	16

== Results ==
=== Men's individual rapid ===
==== Round 1 ====
1–3 November

Rank	Athlete	R1	R2	R3	R4	R5	R6	R7	R8	R9	Pts
1	Wang Hao (CHN)	IRQ2; 1	KAZ2; 1	KAZ1; 1	CHN2 ½	IRI2; 1	IND2; 1	IND1 ½	IRI1; 1	VIE1; 1	8
2	Murtas Kazhgaleyev (KAZ)	THA1; 1	QAT1; 1	CHN1; 0	PHI2; 1	KAZ2; 1	VIE2 ½	IRI2; 1	IND1; 1	CHN2 ½	7
3	Bu Xiangzhi (CHN)	IRQ1; 1	QAT2; 1	VIE1; 1	CHN1 ½	IND2 ½	IND1; 0	UZB1; 1	IRI2; 0	KAZ1 ½	6½
4	Krishnan Sasikiran (IND)	THA2; 1	IRI1 ½	IRI2 ½	QAT1; 1	VIE1; 1	CHN2; 1	CHN1 ½	KAZ1; 0	VIE2; 1	6½
5	Pentala Harikrishna (IND)	MGL2; 1	PHI1; 1	VIE2 ½	IRI1; 1	CHN2 ½	CHN1; 0	UZB2; 1	VIE1 ½	UZB1; 1	6½
6	Mohammed Al-Sayed (QAT)	TPE1; 1	KAZ1; 0	NEP1; 1	IND1; 0	IRI1; 1	UZB1; 0	THA2; 1	JOR1; 1	IRI2; 1	6
7	Rogelio Antonio (PHI)	JPN1; 1	IND2; 0	SRI1; 1	IRQ1 ½	IRQ2; 1	IRI2; 0	JOR1; 1	VIE2 ½	KAZ2; 1	6
8	Lê Quang Liêm (VIE)	SRI1; 1	UZB2; 1	CHN2; 0	JOR1; 1	IND1; 0	PHI2; 1	VIE2 ½	IND2 ½	CHN1; 0	5
9	Elshan Moradi (IRI)	MDV1; 1	IND1 ½	UZB1; 1	IND2; 0	QAT1; 0	IRQ2; 1	MGL1; 1	CHN1; 0	UZB2 ½	5
10	Nguyễn Ngọc Trường Sơn (VIE)	NEP1; 1	JOR1; 1	IND2 ½	IRI2; 0	IRQ1; 1	KAZ1 ½	VIE1 ½	PHI1 ½	IND1; 0	5
11	Pavel Kotsur (KAZ)	MAC1; 1	CHN1; 0	MGL2; 1 WO	UZB2; 1	KAZ1; 0	JOR1; 0	QAT2; 1	MGL2; 1	PHI1; 0	5
12	Anton Filippov (UZB)	MGL1 ½	PHI2; 1	IRI1; 0	QAT2; 1	THA2 ½	QAT1; 1	CHN2; 0	UZB2; 1	IND2; 0	5
13	Mark Paragua (PHI)	MDV2; 1	UZB1; 0	TPE1; 1	KAZ1; 0	SRI1; 1	VIE1; 0	THA1; 1	IRQ2 ½	MGL1 ½	5
14	Sami Khader (JOR)	AFG2; 1	VIE2; 0	AFG1; 1	VIE1; 0	NEP1; 1	KAZ2; 1	PHI1; 0	QAT1; 0	THA2; 1	5
15	Düürenbayaryn Erkhembayar (MGL)	UZB1 ½	IRQ2; 0	THA2; 0 WO	TPE1; 1	MAC1; 1	SRI1; 1	IRI1; 0	QAT2; 1	PHI2 ½	5
16	Balgany Bayarmandakh (MGL)	IND2; 0	JPN1; 1	KAZ2; 0 WO	THA2; 0	MDV2; 1	AFG1; 1	NEP1; 1	KAZ2; 0	IRQ2; 1	5
17	Wisuwat Teerapabpaisit (THA)	KAZ1; 0	TPE1; 0	MDV2; 1	JPN2; 1	UZB2; 0	AFG2; 1	PHI2; 0	MDV1; 1	NEP1; 1	5
18	Ehsan Ghaemmaghami (IRI)	JOR2; 1	AFG1; 1	IND1 ½	VIE2; 1	CHN1; 0	PHI1; 1	KAZ1; 0	CHN2; 0	QAT1; 0	4½
19	Mohammed Al-Modiahki (QAT)	NEP2; 1	CHN2; 0	IRQ2 ½	UZB1; 0	AFG2; 1	IRQ1; 1	KAZ2; 0	MGL1; 0	JPN1; 1	4½
20	Ahmed Aziz (IRQ)	CHN2; 0	NEP2; 1	AFG2; 1	PHI1 ½	VIE2; 0	QAT2; 0	JPN1; 1	THA2; 0	SRI1; 1	4½
21	Dzhurabek Khamrakulov (UZB)	JPN2; 1	VIE1; 0	JOR2; 1	KAZ2; 0	THA1; 1	THA2; 1	IND2; 0	UZB1; 0	IRI1 ½	4½
22	Hussein Ali (IRQ)	CHN1; 0	MGL1; 1	QAT2 ½	MAC1; 1	PHI1; 0	IRI1; 0	JOR2; 1	PHI2 ½	MGL2; 0	4
23	Jirapak Pitirotjirathon (THA)	IND1; 0	MAC1 ½	MGL1; 1 WO	MGL2; 1	UZB1 ½	UZB2; 0	QAT1; 0	IRQ1; 1	JOR1; 0	4
24	Athula Russell (SRI)	VIE1; 0	MDV1; 1	PHI1; 0	AFG1; 1	PHI2; 0	MGL1; 0	TPE1; 1	NEP2; 1	IRQ1; 0	4
25	Badri Lal Nepali (NEP)	VIE2; 0	JPN2; 1	QAT1; 0	MDV1; 1	JOR1; 0	TPE1; 1	MGL2; 0	AFG1; 1	THA1; 0	4
26	Bilam Lal Shrestha (NEP)	QAT2; 0	IRQ1; 0	MAC1; 0	JPN1; 0	BYE; 1	JPN2; 1	AFG2; 1	SRI1; 0	AFG1; 1	4
27	Atsuhiko Kobayashi (JPN)	PHI1; 0	MGL2; 0	MDV1; 0	NEP2; 1	JPN2; 1	MAC1 ½	IRQ1; 0	TPE1; 1	QAT2; 0	3½
28	Abdul Rahman Ali (MDV)	IRI1; 0	SRI1; 0	JPN1; 1	NEP1; 0	AFG1; 0	MDV2; 1	BYE; 1	THA1; 0	JOR2 ½	3½
29	Solomon Bernardino Celis (MAC)	KAZ2; 0	THA2 ½	NEP2; 1	IRQ2; 0	MGL1; 0	JPN1 ½	AFG1; 0	BYE; 1	MDV2 ½	3½
30	Ahmed Ashraf (MDV)	PHI2; 0	JOR2; 0	THA1; 0	BYE; 1	MGL2; 0	MDV1; 0	JPN2; 1	AFG2; 1	MAC1 ½	3½
31	Baha Saad (JOR)	IRI2; 0	MDV2; 1	UZB2; 0	AFG2; 0	TPE1; 0	BYE; 1	IRQ2; 0	JPN2; 1	MDV1 ½	3½
32	Liu Yeh-yang (TPE)	QAT1; 0	THA1; 1	PHI2; 0	MGL1; 0	JOR2; 1	NEP1; 0	SRI1; 0	JPN1; 0	BYE; 1	3
33	Abasin Mahdi (AFG)	BYE; 1	IRI2; 0	JOR1; 0	SRI1; 0	MDV1; 1	MGL2; 0	MAC1; 1	NEP1; 0	NEP2; 0	3
34	Aminullah Khairandish (AFG)	JOR1; 0	BYE; 1	IRQ1; 0	JOR2; 1	QAT2; 0	THA1; 0	NEP2; 0	MDV2; 0	JPN2; 1	3
35	Osamu Yuki (JPN)	UZB2; 0	NEP1; 0	BYE; 1	THA1; 0	JPN1; 0	NEP2; 0	MDV2; 0	JOR2; 0	AFG2; 0	1

==== Knockout round ====
Semifinals; 3 November		Final; 4 November
Wang Hao (CHN)	1½
Krishnan Sasikiran (IND)	½	Wang Hao (CHN)	½
Murtas Kazhgaleyev (KAZ)	1 (0)	Bu Xiangzhi (CHN)	1½
Bu Xiangzhi (CHN)	1 (1)

=== Women's individual rapid ===
==== Round 1 ====
1–3 November

Rank	Athlete	R1	R2	R3	R4	R5	R6	R7	R8	R9	Pts
1	Hou Yifan (CHN)	MGL2; 1	IRI1; 1	VIE2; 1	IRI2; 1	VIE1; 1	UZB1; 1	QAT1 ½	IND1; 1	KAZ1; 1	8½
2	Zhu Chen (QAT)	IRQ1; 1	KAZ1; 1	VIE1; 0	PHI2; 1	IND2 ½	IRI2; 1	CHN1 ½	UZB1; 1	CHN2 ½	6½
3	Harika Dronavalli (IND)	THA1; 1	KAZ2; 0	PHI1; 1	KAZ1 ½	UZB2; 1	MGL1; 1	VIE1; 1	CHN1; 0	UZB1; 1	6½
4	Zhao Xue (CHN)	PHI1; 1	VIE1; 0	IRQ1; 1	KAZ2; 1	VIE2; 0	IRQ2; 1	PHI2; 1	KAZ1; 1	QAT1 ½	6½
5	Catherine Perena (PHI)	CHN2; 0	IRQ2; 1	IND1; 0	QAT2; 1	SRI1; 1	IRI1; 1	UZB1; 0	KAZ2; 1	VIE2; 1	6
6	Shadi Paridar (IRI)	TPE1; 1	CHN1; 0	JPN1; 1	MDV2; 1	UZB1; 0	PHI1; 0	IRQ1; 1	MGL2; 1	VIE1; 1	6
7	Shercila Cua (PHI)	NEP2; 1	UZB1; 0	JOR2; 1	QAT1; 0	JOR1; 1	IRQ1; 1	CHN2; 0	IRQ2; 1	JPN1; 1	6
8	Hoàng Thị Bảo Trâm (VIE)	SRI1; 1	CHN2; 1	QAT1; 1	UZB1; 1	CHN1; 0	VIE2 ½	IND1; 0	IND2; 1	IRI1; 0	5½
9	Aigerim Rysbayeva (KAZ)	NEP1; 1	QAT1; 0	SRI1; 1	IND1 ½	KAZ2; 1	IND2; 1	VIE2; 1	CHN2; 0	CHN1; 0	5½
10	Nafisa Muminova (UZB)	THA2; 1	PHI2; 1	KAZ2; 1	VIE1; 0	IRI1; 1	CHN1; 0	PHI1; 1	QAT1; 0	IND1; 0	5
11	Phạm Lê Thảo Nguyên (VIE)	JPN1; 1	MAC1; 1	CHN1; 0	UZB2; 1	CHN2; 1	VIE1 ½	KAZ1; 0	IRI2 ½	PHI1; 0	5
12	Guliskhan Nakhbayeva (KAZ)	QAT2; 1	IND1; 1	UZB1; 0	CHN2; 0	KAZ1; 0	TPE1; 1	JOR1; 1	PHI1; 0	IRI2; 1	5
13	Kruttika Nadig (IND)	JPN2; 1	MGL1; 0	JOR1; 1	IRQ2; 1	QAT1 ½	KAZ1; 0	IRI2 ½	VIE1; 0	MGL2; 1	5
14	Delbak Ismael (IRQ)	QAT1; 0	NEP1; 1	CHN2; 0	NEP2; 1	JOR2; 1	PHI2; 0	IRI1; 0	MGL1; 1	JPN2; 1	5
15	Narumi Uchida (JPN)	VIE2; 0	MDV1; 1	IRI1; 0	MAC1; 1	IRQ2; 0	QAT2; 1	UZB2; 1	THA1; 1	PHI2; 0	5
16	Olga Sabirova (UZB)	JOR2; 1	IRI2; 0	MAC1; 1	VIE2; 0	IND1; 0	JPN2; 1	JPN1; 0	NEP1; 1	SRI1; 1	5
17	Atousa Pourkashian (IRI)	JOR1; 1	UZB2; 1	MGL1; 1 WO	CHN1; 0	MGL1 ½	QAT1; 0	IND2 ½	VIE2 ½	KAZ2; 0	4½
18	Iman Hasan (IRQ)	MDV1; 1	PHI1; 0	NEP2; 1	IND2; 0	JPN1; 1	CHN2; 0	MGL1; 1	PHI2; 0	JOR1 ½	4½
19	Sengeravdangiin Otgonjargal (MGL)	MDV2; 1	IND2; 1	IRI2; 0 WO	MGL2; 1	IRI2 ½	IND1; 0	IRQ2; 0	IRQ1; 0	THA1; 1	4½
20	Ghayda Al-Attar (JOR)	IRI2; 0	QAT2; 1	IND2; 0	NEP1; 1	PHI2; 0	MDV2; 1	KAZ2; 0	JOR2; 1	IRQ2 ½	4½
21	Altan-Ölziin Enkhtuul (MGL)	CHN1; 0	TPE1; 1	MDV2; 0 WO	MGL1; 0	NEP1; 1	SRI1; 1	JOR2; 1	IRI1; 0	IND2; 0	4
22	Sachini Ranasinghe (SRI)	VIE1; 0	THA1; 1	KAZ1; 0	MDV1; 1	PHI1; 0	MGL2; 0	QAT2; 1	TPE1; 1	UZB2; 0	4
23	Asmita Adhikari (NEP)	KAZ1; 0	IRQ1; 0	THA2; 1	JOR1; 0	MGL2; 0	MAC1; 1	BYE; 1	UZB2; 0	JOR2; 1	4
24	Reem Blan (QAT)	KAZ2; 0	JOR1; 0	JPN2; 1	PHI1; 0	MDV1; 1	JPN1; 0	SRI1; 0	BYE; 1	MAC1 ½	3½
25	Chen I-chen (TPE)	IRI1; 0	MGL2; 0	THA1; 1	JOR2; 0	NEP2; 1	KAZ2; 0	JPN2 ½	SRI1; 0	BYE; 1	3½
26	Chanida Taweesupmun (THA)	IND1; 0	SRI1; 0	TPE1; 0	THA2 ½	MAC1; 1	MDV1; 1	NEP2; 1	JPN1; 0	MGL1; 0	3½
27	Annie Jane Salvador (MAC)	BYE; 1	VIE2; 0	UZB2; 0	JPN1; 0	THA1; 0	NEP1; 0	MDV1; 1	NEP2; 1	QAT2 ½	3½
28	Emiko Nakagawa (JPN)	IND2; 0	JOR2; 0	QAT2; 0	BYE; 1	MDV2; 1	UZB2; 0	TPE1 ½	THA2; 1	IRQ1; 0	3½
29	Raya Al-Nuimat (JOR)	UZB2; 0	JPN2; 1	PHI2; 0	TPE1; 1	IRQ1; 0	THA2; 1	MGL2; 0	JOR1; 0	NEP1; 0	3
30	Monalisa Khamboo (NEP)	PHI2; 0	THA2; 1	IRQ2; 0	IRQ1; 0	TPE1; 0	BYE; 1	THA1; 0	MAC1; 0	MDV2; 1	3
31	Nusra Abdul Rahman (MDV)	IRQ2; 0	JPN1; 0	BYE; 1	SRI1; 0	QAT2; 0	THA1; 0	MAC1; 0	MDV2; 1	THA2; 1	3
32	Worakamon Koosiripanit (THA)	UZB1; 0	NEP2; 0	NEP1; 0	THA1 ½	BYE; 1	JOR2; 0	MDV2; 1	JPN2; 0	MDV1; 0	2½
33	Moomina Mohamed (MDV)	MGL1; 0	BYE; 1	MGL2; 1 WO	IRI1; 0	JPN2; 0	JOR1; 0	THA2; 0	MDV1; 0	NEP2; 0	2

==== Knockout round ====
Semifinals; 3 November		Final; 4 November
Hou Yifan (CHN)	2
Zhao Xue (CHN)	0	Hou Yifan (CHN)	1½
Zhu Chen (QAT)	1½	Zhu Chen (QAT)	½
Harika Dronavalli (IND)	½

=== Mixed team blitz ===
==== Round 1 ====
31 October

Rank	Team	R1	R2	R3	R4	R5	R6	R7	R8	R9	MP	GP
1	China (CHN)	MGL; 4–0	KAZ; 3–1	IND; 2½–1½	PHI; 3–1	VIE; 2½–1½	QAT; 3½–½	IRI; 2–2	IRQ; 4–0	UZB; 3–1	17	27½
2	Vietnam (VIE)	THA; 3½–½	UZB; 3–1	PHI; 1–3	IRI; 2½–1½	CHN; 1½–2½	IND; 2½–1½	KAZ; 2½–1½	MGL; 3–1	QAT; 3–1	14	22½
3	India (IND)	QAT; 3–1	IRI; 3–1	CHN; 1½–2½	UZB; 3½–½	PHI; 1–3	VIE; 1½–2½	JOR; 4–0	KAZ; 2½–1½	NEP; 4–0	12	24
4	Iran (IRI)	IRQ; 4–0	IND; 1–3	KAZ; 3–1	VIE; 1½–2½	QAT; 2–2	MGL; 4–0	CHN; 2–2	NEP; 4–0	PHI; 2½–1½	12	24
5	Philippines (PHI)	NEP; 4–0	QAT; 2–2	VIE; 3–1	CHN; 1–3	IND; 3–1	KAZ; 1½–2½	UZB; 3½–½	JPN; 4–0	IRI; 1½–2½	11	23½
6	Kazakhstan (KAZ)	JOR; 4–0	CHN; 1–3	IRI; 1–3	IRQ; 3–1	THA; 4–0	PHI; 2½–1½	VIE; 1½–2½	IND; 1½–2½	BYE; 1	10	19½
7	Jordan (JOR)	KAZ; 0–4	MGL; 2–2	QAT; 1–3	BYE; 1	MDV; 3½–½	NEP; 4–0	IND; 0–4	THA; 2–2	JPN; 4–0	10	17½
8	Qatar (QAT)	IND; 1–3	PHI; 2–2	JOR; 3–1	MGL; 2–2	IRI; 2–2	CHN ½–3½	JPN; 4–0	MDV; 4–0	VIE; 1–3	9	19½
9	Uzbekistan (UZB)	JPN; 4–0	VIE; 1–3	IRQ; 3–1	IND ½–3½	MGL; 2–2	MDV; 4–0	PHI ½–3½	BYE; 1	CHN; 1–3	9	17
10	Mongolia (MGL)	CHN; 0–4	JOR; 2–2	THA; 3½–½	QAT; 2–2	UZB; 2–2	IRI; 0–4	BYE; 1	VIE; 1–3	MDV; 4–0	9	15½
11	Iraq (IRQ)	IRI; 0–4	MDV; 4–0	UZB; 1–3	KAZ; 1–3	BYE; 1	JPN; 2–2	NEP; 4–0	CHN; 0–4	THA; 2½–1½	9	15½
12	Thailand (THA)	VIE ½–3½	JPN; 2½–1½	MGL ½–3½	NEP; 3–1	KAZ; 0–4	BYE; 1	MDV; 3½–½	JOR; 2–2	IRQ; 1½–2½	9	14½
13	Japan (JPN)	UZB; 0–4	THA; 1½–2½	BYE; 1	MDV; 3–1	NEP; 2–2	IRQ; 2–2	QAT; 0–4	PHI; 0–4	JOR; 0–4	6	9½
14	Nepal (NEP)	PHI; 0–4	BYE; 1	MDV; 3–1	THA; 1–3	JPN; 2–2	JOR; 0–4	IRQ; 0–4	IRI; 0–4	IND; 0–4	5	7
15	Maldives (MDV)	BYE; 1	IRQ; 0–4	NEP; 1–3	JPN; 1–3	JOR ½–3½	UZB; 0–4	THA ½–3½	QAT; 0–4	MGL; 0–4	2	4

==== Knockout round ====
1 November

Semifinals		Final
China	4 (2)
Iran	4 (1)	China	3½
Vietnam	5½	Vietnam	4½
India	2½

=== Mixed team rapid ===
==== Round 1 ====
5–6 November

Rank	Team	R1	R2	R3	R4	R5	R6	R7	R8	R9	MP	GP
1	China (CHN)	QAT; 3–1	IRI; 3–1	VIE; 3–1	IND; 2–2	UZB; 3½–½	IRQ; 4–0	KAZ; 3½–½	JOR; 2½–½	MGL; 4–0	17	28½
2	Vietnam (VIE)	IRQ; 3½–½	UZB; 3½–½	CHN; 1–3	PHI; 3–1	KAZ; 3–1	QAT; 3½–½	IND; 1½–2½	IRI; 3–1	JPN; 4–0	14	26
3	India (IND)	MGL; 3–1	KAZ; 2½–1½	PHI; 3½–½	CHN; 2–2	QAT; 1½–2½	IRI; 3–1	VIE; 2½–1½	UZB; 1½–2½	THA; 4–0	13	23½
4	Uzbekistan (UZB)	JPN; 3½–½	VIE ½–3½	MGL; 3½–½	KAZ; 4–0	CHN ½–3½	PHI; 2½–1½	QAT; 3½–½	IND; 2½–1½	IRI; 2–2	13	22½
5	Kazakhstan (KAZ)	THA; 3½–½	IND; 1½–2½	IRQ; 4–0	UZB; 0–4	VIE; 1–3	NEP; 4–0	CHN ½–3½	MDV; 4–0	BYE; 1	10	19½
6	Philippines (PHI)	NEP; 4–0	MDV; 4–0	IND ½–3½	VIE; 1–3	IRI ½–3½	UZB; 1½–2½	BYE; 1	THA; 4–0	QAT; 3–1	10	19½
7	Jordan (JOR)	IRI; 0–4	QAT; 0–4	THA; 2½–1½	IRQ; 1½–2½	BYE; 1	MDV; 4–0	JPN; 4–0	CHN ½–2½	NEP; 4–0	10	17½
8	Iran (IRI)	JOR; 4–0	CHN; 1–3	QAT; 1½–2½	MGL; 3–1	PHI; 3½–½	IND; 1–3	IRQ; 3½–½	VIE; 1–3	UZB; 2–2	9	20½
9	Qatar (QAT)	CHN; 1–3	JOR; 4–0	IRI; 2½–1½	NEP; 4–0	IND; 2½–1½	VIE ½–3½	UZB ½–3½	MGL; 2–2	PHI; 1–3	9	18
10	Mongolia (MGL)	IND; 1–3	THA; 4–0	UZB ½–3½	IRI; 1–3	JPN; 3½–½	BYE; 1	MDV; 4–0	QAT; 2–2	CHN; 0–4	9	17
11	Iraq (IRQ)	VIE ½–3½	JPN; 3–1	KAZ; 0–4	JOR; 2½–1½	NEP; 2–2	CHN; 0–4	IRI ½–3½	BYE; 1	MDV; 4–0	9	13½
12	Japan (JPN)	UZB ½–3½	IRQ; 1–3	BYE; 1	MDV; 3–1	MGL ½–3½	THA; 3½–½	JOR; 0–4	NEP; 3–1	VIE; 0–4	8	12½
13	Nepal (NEP)	PHI; 0–4	BYE; 1	MDV; 3½–½	QAT; 0–4	IRQ; 2–2	KAZ; 0–4	THA; 3–1	JPN; 1–3	JOR; 0–4	7	10½
14	Thailand (THA)	KAZ ½–3½	MGL; 0–4	JOR; 1½–2½	BYE; 1	MDV; 3–1	JPN ½–3½	NEP; 1–3	PHI; 0–4	IND; 0–4	4	7½
15	Maldives (MDV)	BYE; 1	PHI; 0–4	NEP ½–3½	JPN; 1–3	THA; 1–3	JOR; 0–4	MGL; 0–4	KAZ; 0–4	IRQ; 0–4	2	3½

==== Knockout round ====
7 November

Semifinals		Final
China	7
Uzbekistan	1	China	5
Vietnam	4½	Vietnam	3
India	3½
