= Pétanque at the 2009 Asian Indoor Games =

- Venue: Từ Liêm Gymnasium
- Dates: 4–7 November 2009

Pétanque at the 2009 Asian Indoor Games was held in Từ Liêm Gymnasium, Hanoi, Vietnam from 4 November to 7 November 2009.

== Medalists ==
Event	Gold	Silver	Bronze
Men's singles	Pakin Phukram; Thailand	Phạm Thanh Phong; Vietnam	Somok Lengsavath; Laos
Men's singles	Pakin Phukram; Thailand	Phạm Thanh Phong; Vietnam	Mohd Syafiq Abd Razak; Malaysia
Men's doubles	Thailand; Thaloengkiat Phusa-at; Suksan Piachan	Laos; Phonexay Souangmisy; Phonepasert Soukkhaphon	Cambodia; Sok Chanmean; Ok Chimi
Men's doubles	Thailand; Thaloengkiat Phusa-at; Suksan Piachan	Laos; Phonexay Souangmisy; Phonepasert Soukkhaphon	Vietnam; Huỳnh Công Tâm; Vũ Khang Duy
Women's singles	Nguyễn Thị Hiền; Vietnam	Nur Izzati Ismail; Singapore	Souksakhone Sengchanh; Laos
Women's singles	Nguyễn Thị Hiền; Vietnam	Nur Izzati Ismail; Singapore	Suphannee Wongsut; Thailand
Women's doubles	Thailand; Thongsri Thamakord; Phantipha Wongchuvej	Vietnam; Phan Thị Thúy Diễm; Nguyễn Thị Thi	Cambodia; Ouk Sreymom; Ke Leng
Women's doubles	Thailand; Thongsri Thamakord; Phantipha Wongchuvej	Vietnam; Phan Thị Thúy Diễm; Nguyễn Thị Thi	Laos; Manyvanh Boutsabah; Noytavanh Pasert

== Medal table ==
Rank	Nation	Gold	Silver	Bronze	Total
1	Thailand (THA)	3	0	1	4
2	Vietnam (VIE)	1	2	1	4
3	Laos (LAO)	0	1	3	4
4	Singapore (SIN)	0	1	0	1
5	Cambodia (CAM)	0	0	2	2
6	Malaysia (MAS)	0	0	1	1
Totals (6 entries)		4	4	8	16

== Results ==
=== Men's singles ===
==== Round 1 ====
4 November

Pos	Athlete	Pld	W	L	PF	PA	THA	VIE	LAO	MAS	SIN	IND
1	Pakin Phukram (THA)	5	4	1	63	26	—	13–7	11–13	13–2	13–4	13–0
2	Phạm Thanh Phong (VIE)	5	4	1	59	24	7–13	—	13–5	13–6	13–0	13–0
3	Somok Lengsavath (LAO)	5	4	1	57	33	13–11	5–13	—	13–1	13–5	13–3
4	Mohd Syafiq Abd Razak (MAS)	5	2	3	35	56	2–13	6–13	1–13	—	13–12	13–5
5	Cheng Zhi Ming (SIN)	5	1	4	34	57	4–13	0–13	5–13	12–13	—	13–5
6	Subhash Budhaji Umbra (IND)	5	0	5	13	65	0–13	0–13	3–13	5–13	5–13	—

Source: Official website

==== Knockout round ====
5 November

Semifinals		Final
Pakin Phukram (THA)	13
Mohd Syafiq Abd Razak (MAS)	4	Pakin Phukram (THA)	13
Phạm Thanh Phong (VIE)	13	Phạm Thanh Phong (VIE)	4
Somok Lengsavath (LAO)	10

=== Men's doubles ===
==== Round 1 ====
5–6 November

Pos	Team	Pld	W	L	PF	PA	THA	CAM	LAO	VIE	MAS	SIN	JPN	IND
1	Thaloengkiat Phusa-at (THA) Suksan Piachan (THA)	7	7	0	91	22	—	13–10	13–0	13–5	13–2	13–1	13–2	13–2
2	Sok Chanmean (CAM) Ok Chimi (CAM)	7	6	1	88	42	10–13	—	13–10	13–5	13–4	13–6	13–4	13–0
3	Phonexay Souangmisy (LAO) Phonepasert Soukkhaphon (LAO)	7	5	2	75	41	0–13	10–13	—	13–11	13–1	13–0	13–3	13–0
4	Huỳnh Công Tâm (VIE) Vũ Khang Duy (VIE)	7	4	3	73	53	5–13	5–13	11–13	—	13–6	13–3	13–4	13–1
5	Faiza Mohammad (MAS) Shaari Hassan (MAS)	7	3	4	52	62	2–13	4–13	1–13	6–13	—	13–0	13–4	13–6
6	Gary Tan (SIN) Low Yee Wee (SIN)	7	2	5	36	83	1–13	6–13	0–13	3–13	0–13	—	13–12	13–6
7	Hiroyuki Konari (JPN) Yasuteru Oe (JPN)	7	1	6	42	81	2–13	4–13	3–13	4–13	4–13	12–13	—	13–3
8	Bhartkumar Jethalal Chauhan (IND) Tushar Jaiswal (IND)	7	0	7	18	91	2–13	0–13	0–13	1–13	6–13	6–13	3–13	—

Source: Official website

==== Knockout round ====
7 November

Semifinals		Final
Thaloengkiat Phusa-at (THA); Suksan Piachan (THA)	13
Huỳnh Công Tâm (VIE); Vũ Khang Duy (VIE)	3	Thaloengkiat Phusa-at (THA); Suksan Piachan (THA)	13
Sok Chanmean (CAM); Ok Chimi (CAM)	12	Phonexay Souangmisy (LAO); Phonepasert Soukkhaphon (LAO)	3
Phonexay Souangmisy (LAO); Phonepasert Soukkhaphon (LAO)	13

=== Women's singles ===
==== Round 1 ====
4 November

Pos	Athlete	Pld	W	L	PF	PA	LAO	THA	VIE	SIN	MAS	IND
1	Souksakhone Sengchanh (LAO)	5	4	1	64	34	—	12–13	13–5	13–7	13–9	13–0
2	Suphannee Wongsut (THA)	5	4	1	63	39	13–12	—	11–13	13–2	13–9	13–3
3	Nguyễn Thị Hiền (VIE)	5	4	1	57	46	5–13	13–11	—	13–6	13–8	13–8
4	Nur Izzati Ismail (SIN)	5	2	3	41	55	7–13	2–13	6–13	—	13–12	13–4
5	Rabiah Abd Rahman (MAS)	5	1	4	51	58	9–13	9–13	8–13	12–13	—	13–6
6	Sonal Vijay Nikam (IND)	5	0	5	21	65	0–13	3–13	8–13	4–13	6–13	—

Source: Official website

==== Knockout round ====
5 November

Semifinals		Final
Souksakhone Sengchanh (LAO)	6
Nur Izzati Ismail (SIN)	13	Nur Izzati Ismail (SIN)	4
Suphannee Wongsut (THA)	11	Nguyễn Thị Hiền (VIE)	13
Nguyễn Thị Hiền (VIE)	13

=== Women's doubles ===
==== Round 1 ====
5–6 November

Pos	Team	Pld	W	L	PF	PA	THA	CAM	VIE	LAO	JPN	MAS	SIN	IND
1	Thongsri Thamakord (THA) Phantipha Wongchuvej (THA)	7	7	0	91	39	—	13–6	13–7	13–9	13–1	13–9	13–7	13–0
2	Ouk Sreymom (CAM) Ke Leng (CAM)	7	5	2	82	42	6–13	—	13–8	11–13	13–4	13–1	13–2	13–1
3	Phan Thị Thúy Diễm (VIE) Nguyễn Thị Thi (VIE)	7	5	2	80	58	7–13	8–13	—	13–9	13–12	13–3	13–8	13–0
4	Manyvanh Boutsabah (LAO) Noytavanh Pasert (LAO)	7	4	3	78	61	9–13	13–11	9–13	—	8–13	13–3	13–4	13–4
5	Akemi Kinoshita (JPN) Rieko Ujihara (JPN)	7	3	4	65	72	1–13	4–13	12–13	13–8	—	13–10	9–13	13–2
6	Fadriyah Mustafa (MAS) Shazleen Sharif (MAS)	7	2	5	52	83	9–13	1–13	3–13	3–13	10–13	—	13–11	13–7
7	Goh Heoi Bin (SIN) Heo Boon Huay (SIN)	7	2	5	58	74	7–13	2–13	8–13	4–13	13–9	11–13	—	13–0
8	Sayali Anil (IND) Ashwini Vitthal Devkar (IND)	7	0	7	14	91	0–13	1–13	0–13	4–13	2–13	7–13	0–13	—

Source: Official website

==== Knockout round ====
7 November

Semifinals		Final
Thongsri Thamakord (THA); Phantipha Wongchuvej (THA)	13
Manyvanh Boutsabah (LAO); Noytavanh Pasert (LAO)	10	Thongsri Thamakord (THA); Phantipha Wongchuvej (THA)	13
Ouk Sreymom (CAM); Ke Leng (CAM)	10	Phan Thị Thúy Diễm (VIE); Nguyễn Thị Thi (VIE)	5
Phan Thị Thúy Diễm (VIE); Nguyễn Thị Thi (VIE)	13
