= Shuttlecock at the 2009 Asian Indoor Games =

- Venue: Hoàng Mai Gymnasium
- Dates: 2–7 November 2009

Shuttlecock at the 2009 Asian Indoor Games was held in Hoang Mai Gymnasium, Hanoi, Vietnam from 2 November to 7 November 2009.

== Medalists ==
Event	Gold	Silver	Bronze
Men's singles	Nguyễn Anh Tuấn; Vietnam	Southisone Thonmanivong; Laos	Kevin Or; Hong Kong
Men's singles	Nguyễn Anh Tuấn; Vietnam	Southisone Thonmanivong; Laos	Gao Haoguang; China
Men's doubles	Vietnam; Lê Minh Triều; Nguyễn Tuyết Cương	Laos; Khamphong Khodphouthone; Southisone Thonmanivong	Thailand; Kampanat Kitirach; Kittikong Srimongkol
Men's doubles	Vietnam; Lê Minh Triều; Nguyễn Tuyết Cương	Laos; Khamphong Khodphouthone; Southisone Thonmanivong	China; Gao Haoguang; Li Junjian
Men's team	Vietnam; Lê Minh Triều; Nguyễn Anh Tuấn; Nguyễn Ngọc Bách; Nguyễn Tuyết Cương; Lê Thanh Tuấn; Phạm Quang	China; Li Junjian; Gao Haoguang; Zhang Xinyao	Laos; Khamphong Khodphouthone; Champathong Chanthamala; Khonesavanh Vannavong; Southisone Thonmanivong; Pho Ngeun Kongmany; Vathsana Vongphachane
Men's team	Vietnam; Lê Minh Triều; Nguyễn Anh Tuấn; Nguyễn Ngọc Bách; Nguyễn Tuyết Cương; Lê Thanh Tuấn; Phạm Quang	China; Li Junjian; Gao Haoguang; Zhang Xinyao	Thailand; Aphisak Sarachon; Kittikong Srimongkol; Wannimit Promdee; Uthen Kukheaw; Kampanat Kitirach; Praphan Mainoi
Women's singles	Trịnh Thị Nga; Vietnam	Hu Jianping; China	Mak Kwok Hing; Hong Kong
Women's singles	Trịnh Thị Nga; Vietnam	Hu Jianping; China	Jindamon Kubkokkruad; Thailand
Women's doubles	Vietnam; Lê Thị Bé Sáu; Nguyễn Thị Thủy Tiên	Macau; Leong On Kei; Wong Weng Man	Cambodia; San Sophorn; Chea Sreymeas
Women's doubles	Vietnam; Lê Thị Bé Sáu; Nguyễn Thị Thủy Tiên	Macau; Leong On Kei; Wong Weng Man	China; Hu Jianping; Sun Liyan
Women's team	China; Sun Liyan; Wang Juan; Chen Liming; Meng Dongxiao; Hu Jianping; Li Baoyi	Vietnam; Trịnh Thị Nga; Cao Hải Yến; Nguyễn Thị Tuyết Nhung; Hoàng Thị Trà My; Nguyễn Thị Thủy Tiên; Lê Thị Bé Sáu	Macau; Leong On Kei; Lam Ka Man; Wong Weng Man
Women's team	China; Sun Liyan; Wang Juan; Chen Liming; Meng Dongxiao; Hu Jianping; Li Baoyi	Vietnam; Trịnh Thị Nga; Cao Hải Yến; Nguyễn Thị Tuyết Nhung; Hoàng Thị Trà My; Nguyễn Thị Thủy Tiên; Lê Thị Bé Sáu	Laos; Noly Samouty; Khamkhoon Louanglad; Phathoum Phone; Malaythong Daosisavan; Vivalin Sihabouth; Seng Athit Samounty

== Medal table ==
Rank	Nation	Gold	Silver	Bronze	Total
1	Vietnam (VIE)	5	1	0	6
2	China (CHN)	1	2	3	6
3	Laos (LAO)	0	2	2	4
4	Macau (MAC)	0	1	1	2
5	Thailand (THA)	0	0	3	3
6	Hong Kong (HKG)	0	0	2	2
7	Cambodia (CAM)	0	0	1	1
Totals (7 entries)		6	6	12	24

== Results ==
=== Men's singles ===
Quarterfinals; 6 November
Aphisak Sarachon (THA)	15	16
Nguyễn Anh Tuấn (VIE)	21	21
Gao Haoguang (CHN)	23	21
Heng Rawut (CAM)	21	18

Semifinals; 7 November
Nguyễn Anh Tuấn (VIE)	21	21
Kevin Or (HKG)	8	16
Gao Haoguang (CHN)	20	12
Southisone Thonmanivong (LAO)	22	21

Final; 7 November
Nguyễn Anh Tuấn (VIE)	21	21
Southisone Thonmanivong (LAO)	15	13

=== Men's doubles ===
Quarterfinals; 5 November			Semifinals; 5 November			Final; 6 November
			Khamphong Khodphouthone (LAO); Southisone Thonmanivong (LAO)	21	26
Lau Ho Kan (HKG); Ng Yiu Keung (HKG)	17	17	Kampanat Kitirach (THA); Kittikong Srimongkol (THA)	19	24
Kampanat Kitirach (THA); Kittikong Srimongkol (THA)	21	21				Khamphong Khodphouthone (LAO); Southisone Thonmanivong (LAO)	22	16
Gao Haoguang (CHN); Li Junjian (CHN)	21	21				Lê Minh Triều (VIE); Nguyễn Tuyết Cương (VIE)	24	21
Heng Rawut (CAM); Chhin Vitou (CAM)	9	13	Gao Haoguang (CHN); Li Junjian (CHN)	21	18
			Lê Minh Triều (VIE); Nguyễn Tuyết Cương (VIE)	23	21

=== Men's team ===
==== Round 1 ====
2–3 November

Group A
Pos	Team	Pld	W	L	Pts	LAO	THA	CAM
1	Laos	2	2	0	4	—	2–0	2–1
2	Thailand	2	1	1	2	18, 13	—	2–1
3	Cambodia	2	0	2	0	−18, 15, 17	−19, 13, 15	—

Group B
Pos	Team	Pld	W	L	Pts	CHN	VIE	HKG
1	China	2	2	0	4	—	2–1	2–0
2	Vietnam	2	1	1	2	−16, 16, 18	—	2–0
3	Hong Kong	2	0	2	0	15, 9	13, 13	—

Source: Official website

==== Knockout round ====
Semifinals; 3 November				Final; 4 November
Laos	13	13
Vietnam	21	21		Vietnam	23	21
China	19	21	21	China	21	14
Thailand	21	16	8

=== Women's singles ===
Quarterfinals; 6 November
Phathoum Phone (LAO)	8	21	13
Jindamon Kubkokkruad (THA)	21	9	21
Mak Kwok Hing (HKG)	21	19	21
Chea Sreymeas (CAM)	16	21	17
Wong Weng Man (MAC)	8	10
Trịnh Thị Nga (VIE)	21	21

Semifinals; 7 November
Hu Jianping (CHN)	21	21
Jindamon Kubkokkruad (THA)	13	13
Mak Kwok Hing (HKG)	3	3
Trịnh Thị Nga (VIE)	21	21

Final; 7 November
Hu Jianping (CHN)	10	13
Trịnh Thị Nga (VIE)	21	21

=== Women's doubles ===
Quarterfinals; 5 November
Malaythong Daosisavan (LAO); Phathoum Phone (LAO)	21	16	14
Leong On Kei (MAC); Wong Weng Man (MAC)	16	21	21
Mak Kwok Hing (HKG); Su Mei Ngan (HKG)	7	9
Hu Jianping (CHN); Sun Liyan (CHN)	21	21
Lê Thị Bé Sáu (VIE); Nguyễn Thị Thủy Tiên (VIE)	21	21
Jariya Seesawad (THA); Parinee Kitthaisong (THA)	9	12

Semifinals; 5 November
San Sophorn (CAM); Chea Sreymeas (CAM)	14	11
Leong On Kei (MAC); Wong Weng Man (MAC)	21	21
Hu Jianping (CHN); Sun Liyan (CHN)	18	21	24
Lê Thị Bé Sáu (VIE); Nguyễn Thị Thủy Tiên (VIE)	21	19	26

Final; 6 November
Leong On Kei (MAC); Wong Weng Man (MAC)	15	13
Lê Thị Bé Sáu (VIE); Nguyễn Thị Thủy Tiên (VIE)	21	21

=== Women's team ===
==== Round 1 ====
2–3 November

Group C
Pos	Team	Pld	W	L	Pts	VIE	LAO	THA
1	Vietnam	2	2	0	4	—	2–0	2–0
2	Laos	2	1	1	2	10, 7	—	2–1
3	Thailand	2	0	2	0	18, 16	20, −11, 13	—

Group D
Pos	Team	Pld	W	L	Pts	CHN	MAC	CAM
1	China	2	2	0	4	—	2–0	2–0
2	Macau	2	1	1	2	12, 23	—	2–0
3	Cambodia	2	0	2	0	9, 10	15, 15	—

Source: Official website

==== Knockout round ====
Semifinals; 3 November			Final; 4 November
Vietnam	21	21
Macau	16	14	Vietnam	15	17
China	21	21	China	21	21
Laos	15	16
