= Dragon and lion dance at the 2009 Asian Indoor Games =

- Venue: Nguyễn Du Gymnasium
- Dates: 2–4 November

Dragon & Lion dance at the 2009 Asian Indoor Games was held at Nguyễn Du Gymnasium, Ho Chi Minh City, Vietnam from 2 November to 4 November 2009.

== Medalists ==
=== Dragon dance ===
| Event | Gold | Silver | Bronze |
|---|---|---|---|
| Compulsory | Hong Kong; Chan Cheuk Hei; Wan Chung Pan; Chung Ho Yin; Cheng Ka Fai; Cheung Ka Ki; Cheung Ka Wai; Wong Ming Chung; Yip Shing On; Tsang Siu Wa; Lui Tun Sum; Wong Yat Fei | Macau; Lei Io Neng; Kou Iong Chi; Ng Ka Fu; Wong Ka Kin; Lo Ka Seng; Kong Kan Pio; Chio Man Tou; Chau Meng Chon; Mou Wai Hong; Kam Wai Kit; Leong Wai Ngai | Chinese Taipei; Yu Ching-hui; Chang Chi-wen; Liu Chun-yu; Lin Jian-zhi; Chang Lan-lin; Hu Ping-sheng; Hu Shen-hsiang; Chang Shih-ying; Liang Teng-wei; Hsieh Wen-che; Wu Wen-chin; Wu Yen-tsung |
| Optional | China; Chen Guangji; Sun Guangshuai; Mu Heng; Zhang Peng; Liu Qinglong; Chen Shujun; Song Xiaoguang; Liu Yong; Zhao Yongxian; Du Yunlong | Malaysia; Teo Guan Hock; Chow Juee Seng; Chin Pei Tze; Ng Tong Lin; Pook Wei Hong; Soo Yon Fook; Chai Yoong Liang | Indonesia; Alwi Salim; Arifin; Bambang Suryono; Budi Santoso; Denny Fernadi Kho; Fuad Eddy; Hendra; Lilijan; Maradona Roesli; Tjoe Agus Salim |

=== Northern lion ===
| Event | Gold | Silver | Bronze |
|---|---|---|---|
| Compulsory | Vietnam; Tát Chí Hải; Huỳnh Công Phát; Lê Minh Quang; Giang Quốc Nghiệp; Nguyễn Tấn Vinh; Trần Thanh Quang; Nguyễn Việt Thành | Hong Kong; Chak Chi Kit; Steven Cheng; Ko Ka Tat; Fan Pui Kuen; Chan Sai Yung; Ko Sing Chiu; Ng Tsz Kin | Macau; Si Chon Pui; Ng Hong Mang; Si Iek Long; Chan Ka Hou; Leong Kin Seng; Kou Kun Chi; Che Seng Seong; Cai Yi Yi |
| Optional | Chinese Taipei; Lin Chun-hsien; Lai Jia-hong; Meng Kuang-wei; Jan Mao-ping; Hsiao Tai-hao; Wu Teng-chao; Yeh Tzu-hao; Tai Wei-hsun | Malaysia; Lee Chi Hao; Tang Gao Yi; Tai Joo Hwak; Liang Kae Sheng; Liang Kae Song; Chong Wen Sheng; Ooi Yik Ming; Alex Tan | Thailand; Baramee Kulsawadmongkol; Jetsada Wongtanaphon; Pitaya Saeyang; Pongsak Saeyang; Samart Theppharat; Sujinda Saeyang; Tanakit Boriboon; Thanatkit Boonna |

=== Southern lion ===
| Event | Gold | Silver | Bronze |
|---|---|---|---|
| Compulsory | Macau; Chan Chi Hou; Mak Chi Leong; Cheang Hou Chun; Leong Ka Weng; Wong Ka Weng; Ieong Kam In; Cheang Kin Meng; Lei Kin Nam | Vietnam; Đặng Anh Phương Vũ; Ngô Diệp Khanh Trương; Lê Minh Cảnh; Ngô Nhật Linh; Trần Thanh Kim Cương; Trần Thanh Quang; Giang Thông Vũ Chí; Vương Vĩ Sanh | Hong Kong; Lawrence Leung; Chor King Man; Chiang Man Yuen; Tang Tak Wai; Cheung Wai Yu; Tang Wan Man |
| Optional | Malaysia; Ang Aik Meng; Ng Chin Ann; Tiong Chun Khai; Te Hwa Chong; Chong Kok Fu; Wong Lian Khai; Si Tiam Yong; Lim Wei Khang | Chinese Taipei; Huang Chun-chun; Lai Pei-lin; Liao Pei-yu; Yang Tien-te; Lee Wen-yi; Lai Ying-chen | Thailand; Baramee Kulsawadmongkol; Jetsada Wongtanaphon; Pitaya Saeyang; Pongsak Saeyang; Samart Theppharat; Sujinda Saeyang; Tanakit Boriboon; Thanatkit Boonna |

== Medal table ==
| Rank | Nation | Gold | Silver | Bronze | Total |
|---|---|---|---|---|---|
| 1 | Malaysia (MAS) | 1 | 2 | 0 | 3 |
| 2 | Chinese Taipei (TPE) | 1 | 1 | 1 | 3 |
| 2 | Hong Kong (HKG) | 1 | 1 | 1 | 3 |
| 2 | Macau (MAC) | 1 | 1 | 1 | 3 |
| 5 | Vietnam (VIE) | 1 | 1 | 0 | 2 |
| 6 | China (CHN) | 1 | 0 | 0 | 1 |
| 7 | Thailand (THA) | 0 | 0 | 2 | 2 |
| 8 | Indonesia (INA) | 0 | 0 | 1 | 1 |
| Totals (8 entries) | | 6 | 6 | 6 | 18 |

== Results ==
=== Dragon dance ===
==== Compulsory ====
4 November

| Rank | Team | Score |
|---|---|---|
| 1st place, gold medalist(s) | Hong Kong | 9.25 |
| 2nd place, silver medalist(s) | Macau | 9.20 |
| 3rd place, bronze medalist(s) | Chinese Taipei | 9.17 |
| 4 | Vietnam | 9.02 |

==== Optional ====
2 November

| Rank | Team | Score |
|---|---|---|
| 1st place, gold medalist(s) | China | 9.28 |
| 2nd place, silver medalist(s) | Malaysia | 9.17 |
| 3rd place, bronze medalist(s) | Indonesia | 9.05 |
| 4 | Thailand | 9.04 |

=== Northern lion ===
==== Compulsory ====
2 November

| Rank | Team | Score |
|---|---|---|
| 1st place, gold medalist(s) | Vietnam | 9.25 |
| 2nd place, silver medalist(s) | Hong Kong | 9.15 |
| 3rd place, bronze medalist(s) | Macau | 9.15 |

==== Optional ====
3 November

| Rank | Team | Score |
|---|---|---|
| 1st place, gold medalist(s) | Chinese Taipei | 9.29 |
| 2nd place, silver medalist(s) | Malaysia | 8.12 |
| 3rd place, bronze medalist(s) | Thailand | 8.09 |

=== Southern lion ===
==== Compulsory ====
3 November

| Rank | Team | Score |
|---|---|---|
| 1st place, gold medalist(s) | Macau | 9.27 |
| 2nd place, silver medalist(s) | Vietnam | 9.19 |
| 3rd place, bronze medalist(s) | Hong Kong | 9.15 |

==== Optional ====
4 November

| Rank | Team | Score |
|---|---|---|
| 1st place, gold medalist(s) | Malaysia | 9.29 |
| 2nd place, silver medalist(s) | Chinese Taipei | 9.20 |
| 3rd place, bronze medalist(s) | Thailand | 9.09 |
| 4 | Indonesia | 8.21 |
