= Muaythai at the 2009 Asian Indoor Games =

- Venue: Rạch Miễu Gymnasium
- Dates: 3–7 November 2009

Muaythai was contested at the 2009 Asian Indoor Games in Ho Chi Minh City, Vietnam from 3 November to 7 November. The competition took place at Rạch Miễu Gymnasium.

== Medalists ==
=== Men ===
Event	Gold	Silver	Bronze
Flyweight; 48–51 kg	Thongbang Seuaphom; Laos	Lê Hữu Phúc; Vietnam	Ho Kwok Keung; Hong Kong
Flyweight; 48–51 kg	Thongbang Seuaphom; Laos	Lê Hữu Phúc; Vietnam	Hossein Nassiri; Iran
Bantamweight; 51–54 kg	Anuchit Sathit; Thailand	Chayuideth Chanphiew; Laos	Harish Kumar; India
Bantamweight; 51–54 kg	Anuchit Sathit; Thailand	Chayuideth Chanphiew; Laos	Saif Zakzook; Jordan
Featherweight; 54–57 kg	Nguyễn Trần Duy Nhất; Vietnam	Weerapol Nonting; Thailand	Birzhan Aukenov; Kazakhstan
Featherweight; 54–57 kg	Nguyễn Trần Duy Nhất; Vietnam	Weerapol Nonting; Thailand	Sherzod Sharipov; Uzbekistan
Lightweight; 57–60 kg	Pongpan Plengsanthia; Thailand	Firdavsiy Kholmuratov; Uzbekistan	Zaidi Laruan; Philippines
Lightweight; 57–60 kg	Pongpan Plengsanthia; Thailand	Firdavsiy Kholmuratov; Uzbekistan	Wang Kang; China
Welterweight; 63.5–67 kg	Daulet Otarbayev; Kazakhstan	Yaser Abusafiyah; Jordan	Mustapha Yaghmour; Lebanon
Welterweight; 63.5–67 kg	Daulet Otarbayev; Kazakhstan	Yaser Abusafiyah; Jordan	Jay Harold Gregorio; Philippines
Light middleweight 67–71 kg	Vahid Roshani; Iran	Wang Guan; China	Khaled Al-Azemi; Kuwait
Light middleweight 67–71 kg	Vahid Roshani; Iran	Wang Guan; China	Artur Kadirkulov; Uzbekistan

=== Women ===
Event	Gold	Silver	Bronze
Flyweight; 48–51 kg	Konnika Nuanboriboon; Thailand	Maricel Subang; Philippines	Songka Chanthavong; Laos
Flyweight; 48–51 kg	Konnika Nuanboriboon; Thailand	Maricel Subang; Philippines	Jenny So; Hong Kong
Bantamweight; 51–54 kg	Wanlaya Pongta; Thailand	Liu Jia; China	Ikkei Nagamitsu; Japan
Bantamweight; 51–54 kg	Wanlaya Pongta; Thailand	Liu Jia; China	Shalu Kumari; India
Lightweight; 57–60 kg	Jiang Xianting; China	Trần Thị Hương; Vietnam	Vongdeuan Chanthanivong; Laos
Lightweight; 57–60 kg	Jiang Xianting; China	Trần Thị Hương; Vietnam	Rana Mohammed; Iraq

== Medal table ==
Rank	Nation	Gold	Silver	Bronze	Total
1	Thailand (THA)	4	1	0	5
2	China (CHN)	1	2	1	4
3	Vietnam (VIE)	1	2	0	3
4	Laos (LAO)	1	1	2	4
5	Iran (IRI)	1	0	1	2
5	Kazakhstan (KAZ)	1	0	1	2
7	Philippines (PHI)	0	1	2	3
7	Uzbekistan (UZB)	0	1	2	3
9	Jordan (JOR)	0	1	1	2
10	Hong Kong (HKG)	0	0	2	2
10	India (IND)	0	0	2	2
12	Iraq (IRQ)	0	0	1	1
12	Japan (JPN)	0	0	1	1
12	Kuwait (KUW)	0	0	1	1
12	Lebanon (LIB)	0	0	1	1
Totals (15 entries)		9	9	18	36

== Results ==
=== Men ===
==== 51 kg ====
Quarterfinals; 3 November
Fong U Wai (MAC)
Hossein Nassiri (IRI)	RSCO
Thongbang Seuaphom (LAO)	RSCI
Khalid Bin Ali Al-Haddad (IND)

Semifinals; 5 November
Lê Hữu Phúc (VIE)	4
Ho Kwok Keung (HKG)	1
Hossein Nassiri (IRI)	0
Thongbang Seuaphom (LAO)	5

Final; 7 November
Lê Hữu Phúc (VIE)	0
Thongbang Seuaphom (LAO)	5

==== 54 kg ====
Semifinals; 3 November		Final; 7 November
Harish Kumar (IND)
Chayuideth Chanphiew (LAO)	RSCH	Chayuideth Chanphiew (LAO)	0
Anuchit Sathit (THA)	5	Anuchit Sathit (THA)	5
Saif Zakzook (JOR)	0

==== 57 kg ====
Quarterfinals; 4 November
Byambasürengiin Amartüvshin (MGL)	0
Nguyễn Trần Duy Nhất (VIE)	5

Semifinals; 5 November
Birzhan Aukenov (KAZ)	0
Weerapol Nonting (THA)	5
Sherzod Sharipov (UZB)	1
Nguyễn Trần Duy Nhất (VIE)	4

Final; 7 November
Weerapol Nonting (THA)	1
Nguyễn Trần Duy Nhất (VIE)	4

==== 60 kg ====
Round 1 November 2
Ali Saher (IRQ)	5
Chuluunbaataryn Shijir-Erdene (MGL)	0
Masayuki Uchida (JPN)	3
Yaser Samadi (IRI)	2
Firdavsiy Kholmuratov (UZB)	RSCO
Manjur Alam Qazi (IND)

Quarterfinals; 4 November
Pongpan Plengsanthia (THA)	KO
Aday Abuhasoah (JOR)
Lam Man Hou (MAC)
Zaidi Laruan (PHI)	RSCO
Wang Kang (CHN)	4
Ali Saher (IRQ)	1
Masayuki Uchida (JPN)
Firdavsiy Kholmuratov (UZB)	RSCI

Semifinals; 5 November
Pongpan Plengsanthia (THA)	5
Zaidi Laruan (PHI)	0
Wang Kang (CHN)	2
Firdavsiy Kholmuratov (UZB)	3

Final; 7 November
Pongpan Plengsanthia (THA)	5
Firdavsiy Kholmuratov (UZB)	0

==== 67 kg ====
Round 1 November 2
Mustafa Farhan (IRQ)	RSCH
Hồ Thanh Hùng (VIE)
Zhang Xiaolong (CHN)	1
Yaser Abusafiyah (JOR)	4
Tatsuya Ishii (JPN)	RSCO
Ali Sharif Taresh (KUW)

Quarterfinals; 4 November
Mustapha Yaghmour (LIB)	5
Otgonsürengiin Lkhasüren (MGL)	0
Sengchanh Sivongsa (LAO)	0
Daulet Otarbayev (KAZ)	5
Jay Harold Gregorio (PHI)	5
Mustafa Farhan (IRQ)	0
Yaser Abusafiyah (JOR)	5
Tatsuya Ishii (JPN)	0

Semifinals; 5 November
Mustapha Yaghmour (LIB)
Daulet Otarbayev (KAZ)	RSCO
Jay Harold Gregorio (PHI)	1
Yaser Abusafiyah (JOR)	4

Final; 7 November
Daulet Otarbayev (KAZ)	RSCI
Yaser Abusafiyah (JOR)

==== 71 kg ====
Quarterfinals; 4 November
Vahid Roshani (IRI)	5
Nour Salman (LIB)	0
Artur Kadirkulov (UZB)	3
Almas Smagulov (KAZ)	2
Adel Jawad (IRQ)	0
Wang Guan (CHN)	5

Semifinals; 5 November
Khaled Al-Azemi (KUW)
Vahid Roshani (IRI)	RSCO
Artur Kadirkulov (UZB)	0
Wang Guan (CHN)	5

Final; 7 November
Vahid Roshani (IRI)	4
Wang Guan (CHN)	1

=== Women ===
==== 51 kg ====
Quarterfinals; 3 November
Maha Saleh (IRQ)
Songka Chanthavong (LAO)	RSCO
Sarita Devi Nongmaithem (IND)
Maricel Subang (PHI)	RSCO
Nguyễn Thị Tuyết Dung (VIE)	1
Konnika Nuanboriboon (THA)	4
Jenny So (HKG)	5
Ruri Shiraishi (JPN)	0

Semifinals; 5 November
Songka Chanthavong (LAO)	1
Maricel Subang (PHI)	4
Konnika Nuanboriboon (THA)	5
Jenny So (HKG)	0

Final; 7 November
Maricel Subang (PHI)	0
Konnika Nuanboriboon (THA)	5

==== 54 kg ====
Semifinals; 3 November		Final; 7 November
Liu Jia (CHN)	4
Ikkei Nagamitsu (JPN)	1	Liu Jia (CHN)	0
Wanlaya Pongta (THA)	RSCH	Wanlaya Pongta (THA)	5
Shalu Kumari (IND)

==== 60 kg ====
Semifinals; 3 November		Final; 7 November
Trần Thị Hương (VIE)	3
Vongdeuan Chanthanivong (LAO)	2	Trần Thị Hương (VIE)	1
Rana Mohammed (IRQ)	0	Jiang Xianting (CHN)	4
Jiang Xianting (CHN)	5
