= Finswimming at the 2009 Asian Indoor Games =

Competition held in Mỹ Đình National Aquatics Sports Complex, Hanoi, Vietnam

- Venue: Mỹ Đình National Aquatics Sports Complex
- Dates: 31 October – 2 November 2009

Finswimming at the 2009 Asian Indoor Games was held in Mỹ Đình National Aquatics Sports Complex, Hanoi, Vietnam from 31 October to 2 November 2009.

== Medalists ==
=== Men ===
Event	Gold	Silver	Bronze
50 m surface	Yuan Haifeng; China	Lee Kwan-ho; South Korea	Park Sung-ha; South Korea
100 m surface	Nguyễn Trung Kiên; Vietnam	Phan Lưu Cẩm Thành; Vietnam	Miao Jingwei; China
200 m surface	Yoon Young-joong; South Korea	Jian Ka; China	Zhou Weihang; China
400 m surface	Yoon Young-joong; South Korea	You Gyeong-heon; South Korea	Valeriy Yudin; Kazakhstan
800 m surface	Park Chan-ho; South Korea	Trần Bảo Thu; Vietnam	Yang Ping-hua; Chinese Taipei
100 m bi-fins	Nguyễn Nhất Tú; Vietnam	Artyom Klimovich; Kazakhstan	Yuta Hasegawa; Japan
4 × 100 m surface relay	Vietnam; Phan Lưu Cẩm Thành; Đào Ngọc Tuyến; Trần Bảo Thu; Nguyễn Trung Kiên	Japan; Tsuneyuki Masuda; Yuto Uehara; Yuta Hasegawa; Hideaki Sakai	Thailand; Pawat Matjiur; Nuttapong Trachuwanich; Panjapol Kongkhieo; Akkarawat Ruangchairit
4 × 200 m surface relay	South Korea; Park Chan-ho; Park Sung-ha; You Gyeong-heon; Yoon Young-joong	Vietnam; Nguyễn Trung Kiên; Võ Quang Đại; Bùi Đình Khá; Trần Bảo Thu	China; Zhou Weihang; Yuan Haifeng; Cen Jinlong; Jian Ka

=== Women ===
Event	Gold	Silver	Bronze
50 m surface	Xu Huanshan; China	Zhu Baozhen; China	Jang Ye-sol; South Korea
100 m surface	Zhu Baozhen; China	Liang Yaoyue; China	Jang Ye-sol; South Korea
200 m surface	Jeon Ah-ram; South Korea	Zhong Jiexia; China	Choi Sae-rom; South Korea
400 m surface	Liu Jiao; China	Jeon Ah-ram; South Korea	Yu Xin; China
800 m surface	Akina Yamaoka; Japan	Nguyễn Thị Thương; Vietnam	Võ Thị Kiều; Vietnam
100 m bi-fins	Margaretha Herawati; Indonesia	Mabi Tsukioka; Japan	Yayoi Sakamoto; Japan
4 × 100 m surface relay	China; Zhu Baozhen; Liang Yaoyue; Xu Huanshan; Wang Miao	South Korea; Kim Hyeon-jin; Jang Ye-sol; Jeon Ah-ram; Choi Sae-rom	Vietnam; Dương Thị Huyền Trang; Hoàng Thu Phương; Lê Thị Như Hoài; Lưu Thị Phương
4 × 200 m surface relay	Vietnam; Chu Thị Minh Thúy; Hoàng Thu Phương; Nguyễn Thị Quỳnh; Dương Thị Huyền Trang	Japan; Yuka Endo; Ran Ogata; Akina Yamaoka; Mabi Tsukioka	Indonesia; Priscilla Gunawan; Desy Ratnasih Dewanti; Livia Iriana; Angeline Soegianto

== Medal table ==
Rank	Nation	Gold	Silver	Bronze	Total
1	China (CHN)	5	4	4	13
1	South Korea (KOR)	5	4	4	13
3	Vietnam (VIE)	4	4	2	10
4	Japan (JPN)	1	3	2	6
5	Indonesia (INA)	1	0	1	2
6	Kazakhstan (KAZ)	0	1	1	2
7	Chinese Taipei (TPE)	0	0	1	1
7	Thailand (THA)	0	0	1	1
Totals (8 entries)		16	16	16	48

== Results ==
=== Men ===
==== 50 m surface ====
1 November

Rank	Athlete	Heats	Final
1st place, gold medalist(s)	Yuan Haifeng (CHN)	17.09	15.99
2nd place, silver medalist(s)	Lee Kwan-ho (KOR)	16.70	16.16
3rd place, bronze medalist(s)	Park Sung-ha (KOR)	17.05	16.42
4	Miao Jingwei (CHN)	17.45	16.51
5	Hideaki Sakai (JPN)	17.45	16.53
6	Tsuneyuki Masuda (JPN)	17.82	17.49
7	Artyom Klimovich (KAZ)	18.54	19.25
8	Bounthanom Vongphachan (LAO)	20.39	20.49
10	Phouthone Louyalath (LAO)	21.00	
11	Wasim Abou Harb (SYR)	22.55	

==== 100 m surface ====
31 October

Rank	Athlete	Heats	Final
1st place, gold medalist(s)	Nguyễn Trung Kiên (VIE)	39.52	37.01
2nd place, silver medalist(s)	Phan Lưu Cẩm Thành (VIE)	39.18	37.17
3rd place, bronze medalist(s)	Miao Jingwei (CHN)	39.33	37.43
4	Hideaki Sakai (JPN)	40.79	38.25
5	Adrian Sansoldi Lamano (INA)	39.18	39.00
6	Nurul Fajri (INA)	40.38	40.79
7	Yuta Hasegawa (JPN)	41.46	41.40
8	Bounthanom Vongphachan (LAO)	45.36	45.33
9	Sithavong Philavong (LAO)	45.81	
10	Wasim Abou Harb (SYR)	47.34	
—	Yuan Haifeng (CHN)	DSQ	

==== 200 m surface ====
2 November

Rank	Athlete	Final
1st place, gold medalist(s)	Yoon Young-joong (KOR)	1:24.90
2nd place, silver medalist(s)	Jian Ka (CHN)	1:25.78
3rd place, bronze medalist(s)	Zhou Weihang (CHN)	1:26.94
4	Yang Ping-hua (TPE)	1:28.74
5	Anton Blinkov (KAZ)	1:29.83
6	Allaaedin Al-Hlli (SYR)	1:31.67
7	Hideaki Sakai (JPN)	1:32.04
8	Petrol Apostle Gasoline (INA)	1:32.46
9	Park Sung-ha (KOR)	1:32.57
10	Akkarawat Ruangchairit (THA)	1:33.93
10	Panjapol Kongkhieo (THA)	1:33.93
12	Yuto Uehara (JPN)	1:37.24
13	Sithavong Philavong (LAO)	1:41.37
14	Bounthanom Vongphachan (LAO)	1:47.01

==== 400 m surface ====
1 November

Rank	Athlete	Final
1st place, gold medalist(s)	Yoon Young-joong (KOR)	3:04.84
2nd place, silver medalist(s)	You Gyeong-heon (KOR)	3:07.56
3rd place, bronze medalist(s)	Valeriy Yudin (KAZ)	3:08.77
4	Zhou Weihang (CHN)	3:09.54
5	Yang Ping-hua (TPE)	3:12.38
6	Jian Ka (CHN)	3:15.55
7	Anton Blinkov (KAZ)	3:22.31
8	Panjapol Kongkhieo (THA)	3:25.22
9	Allaaedin Al-Hlli (SYR)	3:27.72
10	Nuttapong Trachuwanich (THA)	3:30.12
11	Sithavong Philavong (LAO)	3:41.16
12	Bounthanom Vongphachan (LAO)	3:42.46

==== 800 m surface ====
2 November

Rank	Athlete	Final
1st place, gold medalist(s)	Park Chan-ho (KOR)	6:34.84
2nd place, silver medalist(s)	Trần Bảo Thu (VIE)	6:38.77
3rd place, bronze medalist(s)	Yang Ping-hua (TPE)	6:41.01
4	Valeriy Yudin (KAZ)	6:43.60
5	You Gyeong-heon (KOR)	6:50.41
6	Hans Hafner Yosaputra (INA)	6:51.13
7	Bùi Đình Khá (VIE)	6:53.98

==== 100 m bi-fins ====
1 November

Rank	Athlete	Heats	Final
1st place, gold medalist(s)	Nguyễn Nhất Tú (VIE)	47.60	44.59
2nd place, silver medalist(s)	Artyom Klimovich (KAZ)	45.91	45.85
3rd place, bronze medalist(s)	Yuta Hasegawa (JPN)	47.39	46.24
4	Bayu Adiwibowo (INA)	48.14	47.01
5	Serik Kozhakhmetov (KAZ)	47.36	47.13
6	Akkarawat Ruangchairit (THA)	48.69	47.47
7	Hoàng Đình Long (VIE)	47.90	47.57
8	Wasim Abou Harb (SYR)	49.26	49.76
9	Hideaki Sakai (JPN)	49.46	
10	Pawat Matjiur (THA)	49.94	

==== 4 × 100 m surface relay ====
2 November

Rank	Team	Final
1st place, gold medalist(s)	Vietnam (VIE)	2:33.26
2nd place, silver medalist(s)	Japan (JPN)	2:40.19
3rd place, bronze medalist(s)	Thailand (THA)	2:43.88
4	Laos (LAO)	3:05.69

==== 4 × 200 m surface relay ====
31 October

Rank	Team	Final
1st place, gold medalist(s)	South Korea (KOR)	5:44.74
2nd place, silver medalist(s)	Vietnam (VIE)	5:52.90
3rd place, bronze medalist(s)	China (CHN)	6:01.23
4	Indonesia (INA)	6:15.99
5	Thailand (THA)	6:24.53

=== Women ===
==== 50 m surface ====
1 November

Rank	Athlete	Heats	Final
1st place, gold medalist(s)	Xu Huanshan (CHN)	18.17	17.28
2nd place, silver medalist(s)	Zhu Baozhen (CHN)	20.21	17.49
3rd place, bronze medalist(s)	Jang Ye-sol (KOR)	20.29	17.80
4	Kim Hyeon-jin (KOR)	20.87	18.79
5	Vera Ryabova (KAZ)	20.94	21.08
6	Thitidarat Sarachantapong (THA)	22.83	22.36
7	Wataniya Nilklad (THA)	22.81	22.57
8	Hela Al-Sharkas (SYR)	23.04	26.91
9	Mireille Hakimeh (SYR)	23.13	
10	Chrichina Sindara (LAO)	23.31	
11	Amdavanh Phanmybounkong (LAO)	24.14	

==== 100 m surface ====
31 October

Rank	Athlete	Heats	Final
1st place, gold medalist(s)	Zhu Baozhen (CHN)	44.13	39.09
2nd place, silver medalist(s)	Liang Yaoyue (CHN)	41.03	39.39
3rd place, bronze medalist(s)	Jang Ye-sol (KOR)	45.82	39.93
4	Choi Sae-rom (KOR)	41.88	40.04
5	Yuka Endo (JPN)	44.52	44.53
6	Ran Ogata (JPN)	45.50	45.37
7	Angeline Soegianto (INA)	45.94	45.45
8	Thitidarat Sarachantapong (THA)	48.85	49.68
9	Wataniya Nilklad (THA)	49.37	
10	Delyana (INA)	49.71	
11	Mireille Hakimeh (SYR)	51.45	
12	Chrichina Sindara (LAO)	51.86	
13	Amdavanh Phanmybounkong (LAO)	52.24	
14	Hela Al-Sharkas (SYR)	52.97	

==== 200 m surface ====
2 November

Rank	Athlete	Final
1st place, gold medalist(s)	Jeon Ah-ram (KOR)	1:31.77
2nd place, silver medalist(s)	Zhong Jiexia (CHN)	1:32.99
3rd place, bronze medalist(s)	Choi Sae-rom (KOR)	1:33.37
4	Li Jing (CHN)	1:35.13
5	Dương Thị Huyền Trang (VIE)	1:36.26
6	Nguyễn Thị Thương (VIE)	1:39.42
7	Vera Ryabova (KAZ)	1:42.06
8	Amdavanh Phanmybounkong (LAO)	1:53.07
9	Chrichina Sindara (LAO)	1:53.99
10	Hela Al-Sharkas (SYR)	1:55.63

==== 400 m surface ====
1 November

Rank	Athlete	Final
1st place, gold medalist(s)	Liu Jiao (CHN)	3:19.86
2nd place, silver medalist(s)	Jeon Ah-ram (KOR)	3:20.81
3rd place, bronze medalist(s)	Yu Xin (CHN)	3:20.97
4	Kim Bo-kyung (KOR)	3:21.98
5	Priscilla Gunawan (INA)	3:36.74
6	Vera Ryabova (KAZ)	3:40.92
7	Livia Iriana (INA)	3:55.90

==== 800 m surface ====
31 October

Rank	Athlete	Final
1st place, gold medalist(s)	Akina Yamaoka (JPN)	7:23.86
2nd place, silver medalist(s)	Nguyễn Thị Thương (VIE)	7:25.79
3rd place, bronze medalist(s)	Võ Thị Kiều (VIE)	7:27.82
4	Priscilla Gunawan (INA)	7:39.22

==== 100 m bi-fins ====
1 November

Rank	Athlete	Final
1st place, gold medalist(s)	Margaretha Herawati (INA)	50.81
2nd place, silver medalist(s)	Mabi Tsukioka (JPN)	52.76
3rd place, bronze medalist(s)	Yayoi Sakamoto (JPN)	53.14
4	Lưu Thị Phương (VIE)	53.46
5	Võ Thị Đài Trang (VIE)	53.49
6	Napatsorn Panna (THA)	56.39
7	Naiyana Leampetcharat (THA)	59.10
8	Mireille Hakimeh (SYR)	59.79

==== 4 × 100 m surface relay ====
31 October

Rank	Team	Final
1st place, gold medalist(s)	China (CHN)	2:41.36
2nd place, silver medalist(s)	South Korea (KOR)	2:43.09
3rd place, bronze medalist(s)	Vietnam (VIE)	2:52.97
4	Japan (JPN)	2:59.94
5	Thailand (THA)	3:18.42
6	Laos (LAO)	3:38.61

==== 4 × 200 m surface relay ====
2 November

Rank	Team	Final
1st place, gold medalist(s)	Vietnam (VIE)	6:33.50
2nd place, silver medalist(s)	Japan (JPN)	6:38.60
3rd place, bronze medalist(s)	Indonesia (INA)	7:04.72
4	Thailand (THA)	7:25.70
5	Laos (LAO)	7:55.85
