= Aerobic gymnastics at the 2009 Asian Indoor Games =

- Venue: Hải Phòng Gymnasium
- Dates: 1–3 November 2009

Aerobic gymnastics at the 2009 Asian Indoor Games was held in Hải Phòng Gymnasium, Hải Phòng, Vietnam from 1 November to 3 November 2009.

== Medalists ==
Event	Gold	Silver	Bronze
Men's individual	Zhou Xiaofeng; China	Song Jong-kun; South Korea	Nattawut Pimpa; Thailand
Women's individual	Huang Jinxuan; China	Roypim Ngampeerapong; Thailand	Shin Hyun-kyung; South Korea
Mixed pair	Vietnam; Vũ Bá Đông; Trần Thị Thu Hà	South Korea; Lee Kyung-ho; Park Yeon-sun	Thailand; Nattawut Pimpa; Roypim Ngampeerapong
Trio	China; Tao Le; Che Lei; Liu Chao	Vietnam; Vũ Bá Đông; Nguyễn Tiến Phương; Trần Thị Thu Hà	South Korea; Cho Won-ho; Hwang In-chan; Kim Gyun-taek

== Medal table ==
Rank	Nation	Gold	Silver	Bronze	Total
1	China (CHN)	3	0	0	3
2	Vietnam (VIE)	1	1	0	2
3	South Korea (KOR)	0	2	2	4
4	Thailand (THA)	0	1	2	3
Totals (4 entries)		4	4	4	12

== Results ==
=== Men's individual ===
1–3 November

Rank	Athlete	Elim.	Final
1st place, gold medalist(s)	Zhou Xiaofeng (CHN)	20.800	20.500
2nd place, silver medalist(s)	Song Jong-kun (KOR)	18.650	20.500
3rd place, bronze medalist(s)	Nattawut Pimpa (THA)	19.250	20.100
4	Nguyễn Tiến Phương (VIE)	19.400	19.700
5	Firdaus Hendry Prabowo (INA)	13.800	17.200
6	Ganboldyn Narankhüü (MGL)	17.800	16.900
7	Veas Sarith (CAM)	15.050	16.550
8	Mayank Jain (IND)	14.900	15.550
9	Danyi Vilmos (VIE)	18.500	
10	Chanchalak Yiammit (THA)	17.200	
11	Siddharth Kadam (IND)	14.250	

=== Women's individual ===
2–3 November

Rank	Athlete	Elim.	Final
1st place, gold medalist(s)	Huang Jinxuan (CHN)	20.800	20.850
2nd place, silver medalist(s)	Roypim Ngampeerapong (THA)	20.000	20.400
3rd place, bronze medalist(s)	Shin Hyun-kyung (KOR)	19.750	20.200
4	Nguyễn Phương Thanh (VIE)	19.500	19.450
5	Citra Resita (INA)	16.300	17.250
6	Manpreet Kour (IND)	16.000	16.150
7	Kartikee Sudhir Shiradkar (IND)	15.500	

=== Mixed pair ===
1–3 November

Rank	Team	Elim.	Final
1st place, gold medalist(s)	Vietnam (VIE); Vũ Bá Đông; Trần Thị Thu Hà	20.100	20.875
2nd place, silver medalist(s)	South Korea (KOR); Lee Kyung-ho; Park Yeon-sun	20.100	20.200
3rd place, bronze medalist(s)	Thailand (THA); Nattawut Pimpa; Roypim Ngampeerapong	19.900	20.125
4	Indonesia (INA); Elip Sumarta; Detia Pirussia	15.550	15.700
5	India (IND); Manvinder Singh; Manpreet Kour	15.750	15.700
6	Vietnam (VIE); Đặng Đình Lộc; Tăng Hiển Thanh	18.750	

=== Trio ===
2–3 November

Rank	Team	Elim.	Final
1st place, gold medalist(s)	China (CHN); Tao Le; Che Lei; Liu Chao	21.600	21.250
2nd place, silver medalist(s)	Vietnam (VIE); Vũ Bá Đông; Nguyễn Tiến Phương; Trần Thị Thu Hà	20.516	20.889
3rd place, bronze medalist(s)	South Korea (KOR); Cho Won-ho; Hwang In-chan; Kim Gyun-taek	20.900	20.000
4	Cambodia (CAM); Sum Sporn; Veas Sarith; Sor Sopheng	17.800	18.350
5	Thailand (THA); Thanyaluck Puttisiriroj; Patharasri Kettuluk; Phattraphon Butsathon	18.553	17.871
6	Mongolia (MGL); Ganboldyn Narankhüü; Gankhuyagiin Bolortulga; Batsugiriin Ölziijargal	16.200	16.400
7	India (IND); Jaskaran Singh; Manvinder Singh; Mayank Jain	15.700	16.300
8	Indonesia (INA); Arif Mufid; Eko Wibby Julianto; Dinny Anggraini	16.300	15.700
9	Vietnam (VIE); Nguyễn Lê Thanh Long; Danyi Vilmos; Nguyễn Văn Sang	18.850	
