= Quần Ngựa Sports Palace =

Palace of sports in Hanoi, Vietnam

Quần Ngựa Sports Place
- Cung thể thao Quần Ngựa
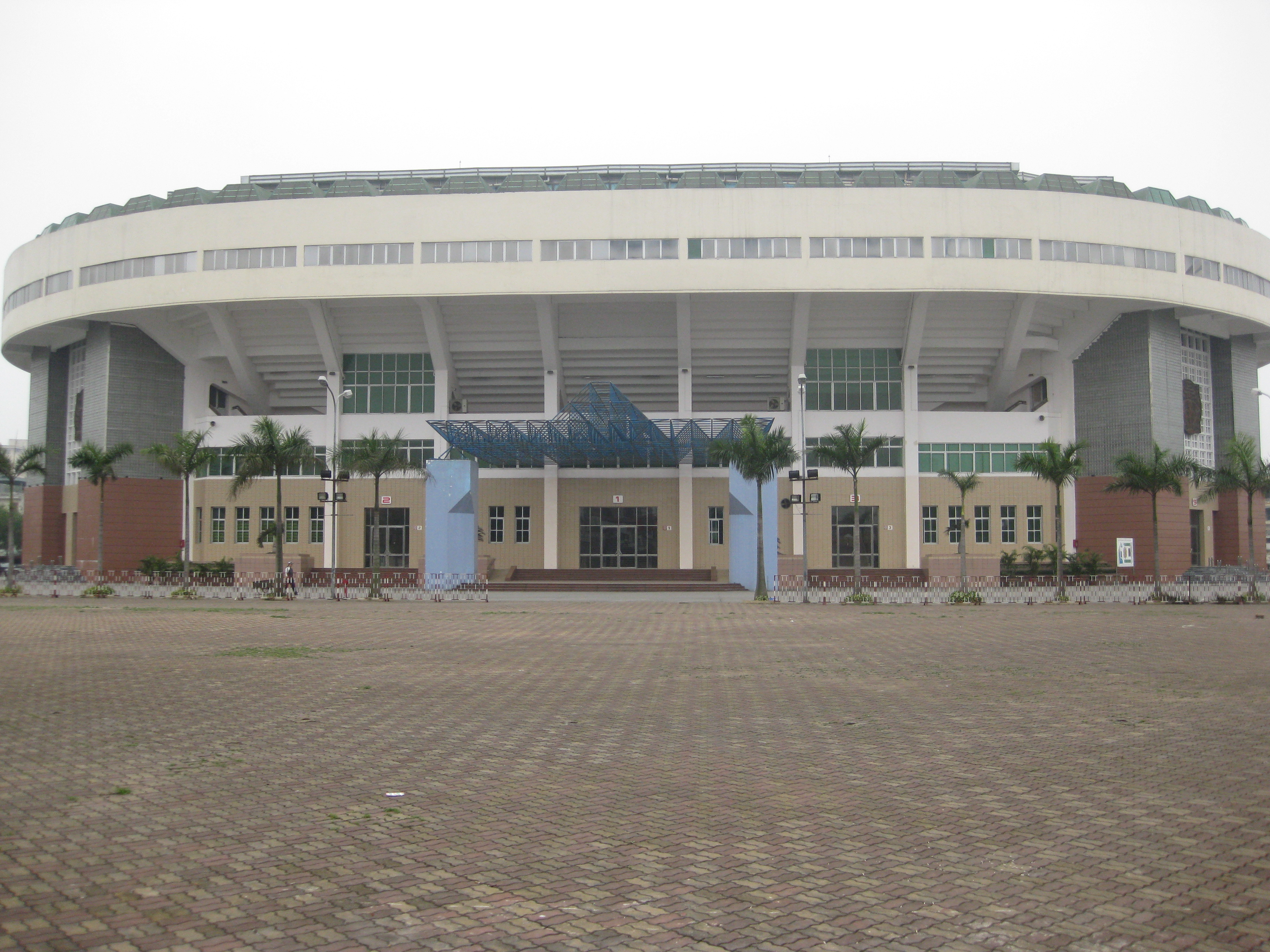
- Interactive map of Quần Ngựa Sports Place
- Full name: Cung thể thao tổng hợp Quần Ngựa
- Address: 30 Văn Cao Street
- Location: Ba Đình, Hanoi, Vietnam
- Coordinates: 21°02′25.5″N 105°48′53″E
- Owner: Hanoi Department of Culture, Sports and Tourism
- Operator: Ba Đình District People's Committee
- Capacity: 5,500
- Type: Palace of sports, Entertainment, Game show, Venues, Concerts Music & Liveshow
- Field size: 24 m × 48 m (79 ft × 157 ft)

Construction
- Opened: 24 April 2003
- Cost: 100 billion VND (211 billion in 2020 VND) (9.13 million in 2020 USD)
- Architect: Chế Đình Hoàng
- Builders: Hanoi Civil Construction Investment, JSC

Quần Ngựa Sports Palace (Vietnamese: Cung thể thao tổng hợp Quần Ngựa or simply Cung thể thao Quần Ngựa) is a palace of sports situated in Ba Đình District, Hanoi, Vietnam.

== History ==
The venue was built on the site that used to be an equestrianism center of Hanoi during the French occupation period in late 19th and early 20th century. Its current name "Quần Ngựa" (horse riding court) derived from the site's equestrian origin. It opened in 2003 in time for the 22nd Southeast Asian Games.

== Design ==
The venue itself covers a floor space of 6,900 m^{2} (74,000 sq ft) on a 51,780 m^{2} (557,400 sq ft) plot that makes up the sports complex. The sports palace consists of 10 departmental rooms, 2 meeting rooms, and 2 halls while the complex also includes practice halls, housing for athletes, transformation station and security department.

Quần Ngựa Sports Palace has a 24 m × 48 m (79 ft × 157 ft) competition field surrounded by 4 spectators' stands with a total capacity of 5,500 seats.

== Usage ==
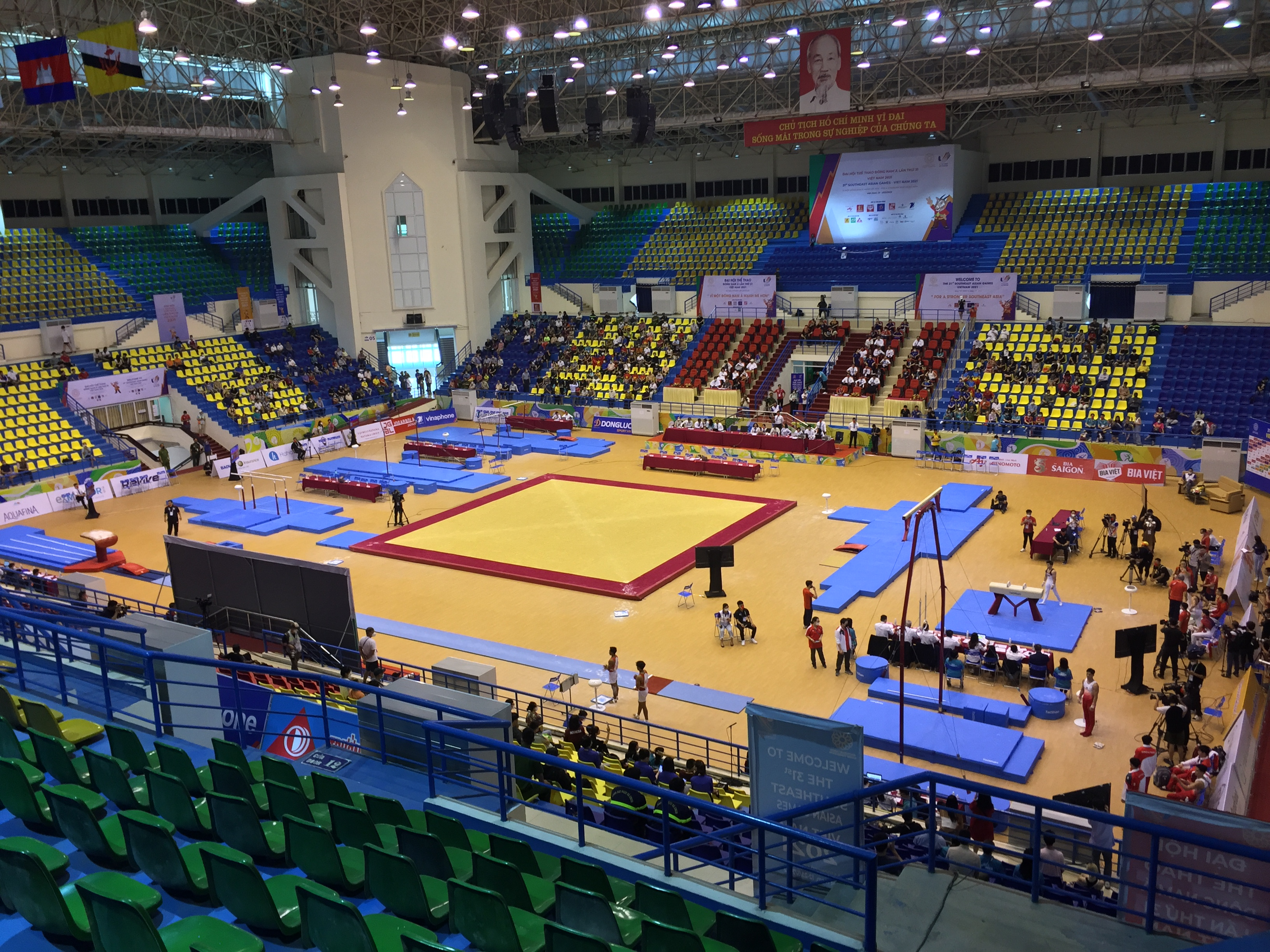
Quần Ngựa Sports Palace during 2021 Southeast Asian Games

- 2003 Southeast Asian Games (gymnastics)
- 2003 ASEAN Para Games (badminton, closing ceremony)
- 2009 Asian Indoor Games (dancesport)
- 2021 Southeast Asian Games (gymnastics)
