= Singapore at the 2009 Asian Indoor Games =

- IOC code: SIN
- NOC: Singapore National Olympic Council
- Website: www.singaporeolympics.com (in English)

in Hanoi
- Competitors: 39 in 7 sports
- Medals Ranked 18th: Gold 1 Silver 7 Bronze 3 Total 11

Asian Indoor Games appearances
- 2005; 2007; 2009; 2013; 2017; 2021; 2025

Singapore participated in the 2009 Asian Indoor Games held in Hanoi, Vietnam on 30 October – 8 November 2009. 39 athletes competed in six events - Bowling, Cuesports, Dancesport, Indoor Petanque, Silat and Xiangqi. Vincent Eu was the Chef de Mission of the Singapore contingent.

The contingent won a total of ten medals, consisting of 1 gold medal, 6 silver medals and 3 bronze medals.

== Participants ==
Sport	Men	Women	Total
Bowling	4	4	8
Cue sports	5	2	7
Dancesport	2	2	4
Pencak silat	8	4	12
Petanque	3	3	6
Xiangqi	2	0	2
Total	24	15	39

== Medals ==
Medal	Name	Sport	Event	Date
Gold	Yusak Rabiatul Adawiyah	Pencak Silat	Women's Single Tunggal	
Silver	Keng Kwang Chan	Cue sports	Men's Single 9-ball Pool	3 Nov
Silver	Peter Gilchrist	Cue sports	Men's Single English Billiard	
Silver	Mohd Julaimi Mohd Saifuddin	Pencak Silat	Men's Class E (>65kg to70kg)	
Silver	Juanda Muhammad Shakir	Pencak Silat	Men's Class G (>75kg to 80kg)	
Silver	Mohd Saiful Mohd Nur Shafiq	Pencak Silat	Men's Class H (>80kg to 85kg)	
Silver	Ismail Nur Izzati	Petanque	Women's Single Petanque	
Bronze	Lin Zhi Shayna Ng	Bowling	Women's Single	2 Nov
Bronze	Mohd Saifullah Mohd Julaimi	Pencak Silat	Men's Class D (>60 kg to 65 kg)	4 Nov
Bronze	Nur Dinniyati Mohamad Julaimi	Pencak Silat	Women's Class B (>50 kg to 55 kg)	4 Nov
