= Lebanon at the 2009 Asian Indoor Games =

- IOC code: LIB
- NOC: Lebanese Olympic Committee

in Hanoi
- Competitors: 2 in 1 sport
- Medals Ranked 32nd: Gold 0 Silver 0 Bronze 1 Total 1

Asian Indoor Games appearances
- 2005; 2007; 2009; 2013; 2017; 2021; 2025

Lebanon participated in the 2009 Asian Indoor Games in Hanoi, Vietnam on 30 October – 8 November 2009.

== Medal winners ==
Medal	Name	Sport	Event	Date
Bronze	Mustapha Yaghmour	Muay	Men's Welter (63.5 – 67 kg)	
