= China at the 2009 Asian Indoor Games =

- IOC code: CHN
- NOC: Chinese Olympic Committee external link (in Chinese and English)

in Hanoi
- Competitors: 132 in 14 sports
- Medals Ranked 1st: Gold 48 Silver 25 Bronze 19 Total 92

Asian Indoor Games appearances
- 2005; 2007; 2009; 2013; 2017; 2021; 2026

China competed in the 2009 Asian Indoor Games which were held in Hanoi, Vietnam from October 30, 2009 to November 8, 2009.

== Medal summary ==
=== Medal table ===
Sport	Gold	Silver	Bronze	Total
Aerobics	3			3
Indoor archery		2		2
Indoor athletics	5	3	1	9
Boxing	3	1		4
Board games (Chess)	3	2	1	6
Board games (Xiangqi)	2	1		3
Cue sports	4	2	1	7
Dancesport	5	2	1	8
Dragon and Lion dance	1			1
Electronic sports	1	1	4	6
Finswimming	5	4	4	13
Muay	1	2	1	4
Shuttlecock	1	2	3	6
Short course swimming	10	2	3	15
Wushu	4	1		5
Total	48	25	19	92

=== Medal winners ===
Medal	Name	Sport	Event
Gold	Zhou Xiaofeng	Aerobics	Men's Single Aerobics
Gold	Liu Chao; Tao Le; Che Lei	Aerobics	Trio N/A Aerobics
Gold	Huang Jinxuan	Aerobics	Women's Single Aerobics
Gold	Su Bingtian	Athletics	Men's Track 60m
Gold	Ji Wei	Athletics	Men's Track 60m Hurdles
Gold	Li Ling	Athletics	Women's Field Pole vault
Gold	Liu Qing	Athletics	Women's Track 1.500m
Gold	Chen Jingwen	Athletics	Women's Track 400m
Gold	Dong Cheng	Boxing	Women's Feather Weight 60 kg
Gold	Zhang Qin	Boxing	Women's Light Bantam Weight 54 kg
Gold	Yang Tingting	Boxing	Women's Light Welter Weight 69 kg
Gold	Bu Xiangzhi	Chess	Men's Single Rapid Chess
Gold	Ni Hua; Bu Xiangzhi; Zhao Xue; Shen Yang; Hou Yifan; Wang Yue	Chess	Team Mixed Rapid Chess
Gold	Hou Yifan	Chess	Women's Single Rapid Chess
Gold	Xiao Guodong	Cue sports	Men's 6-red Snooker
Gold	Li Hewen	Cue sports	Men's Single 9-ball Pool
Gold	Jin Long	Cue sports	Men's Single Snooker
Gold	Chen Siming	Cue sports	Women's Single 6-red Snooker
Gold	Zhang Baiyu; Shi Lei	Dancesport	Pair mixed Paso Doble
Gold	Zhang Baiyu; Shi Lei	Dancesport	Pair mixed Samba
Gold	Zheng Cen; Wu Zhian	Dancesport	Pair mixed Slow Foxtrot
Gold	Shen Hong; Liang Yujie	Dancesport	Pair mixed Tango
Gold	Shen Hong; Liang Yujie	Dancesport	Pair mixed Viennese Waltz
Gold	Chen Guangji; Sun Guangshuai; Mu Heng; Chu Jihua; Zhang Peng; Liu Qinglong; Chen Shujun; Song Xiaoguang; Liu Yong; Zhao Yongxian; Du Yunlong	Dragon and Lion dance	Team's Dragon Dance Optional Exercise
Gold	He Xuebin	E-Sports	Need for Speed: Most wanted
Gold	Yuan Haifeng	Finswimming	Men's Surface 50m
Gold	Zhu Baozhen	Finswimming	Women's Surface 100m
Gold	Liu Jiao	Finswimming	Women's Surface 400m
Gold	Xu Huanshan	Finswimming	Women's Surface 50m
Gold	Zhu Baozhen; Xu Huanshan; Wang Miao; Liang Yaoyue	Finswimming	Women's Team Surface 4 × 100 m
Gold	Jiang Xianting	Muay	Women's Light (57 – 60 kg)
Gold	Li Baoyi; Meng Dongxiao; Hu Jianping; Wang Juan; Chen Liming; Sun Liyan	Shuttlecock	Women's Trio Shuttle cock
Gold	Shi Feng	Swimming	Men's Backstroke 100m
Gold	Shi Feng	Swimming	Men's Backstroke 50m
Gold	Shi Feng	Swimming	Men's Butterfly 100m
Gold	Shi Feng	Swimming	Men's Butterfly 50m
Gold	Pu Wenjie	Swimming	Men's Freestyle 100m
Gold	Pu Wenjie	Swimming	Men's Freestyle 200m
Gold	Guo Fan	Swimming	Women's Butterfly 100m
Gold	Guo Fan	Swimming	Women's Butterfly 50m
Gold	Guo Fan	Swimming	Women's Individual Medley 200m
Gold	Chen Cheng; Guo Fan; Guo Jiarui; Li Shuang; Han Wei; Tian Xinhe	Swimming	Women's Team Freestyle Relay 4 x 50m
Gold	Gong Jinlan	Wushu	Women's 52 kg
Gold	Shi Wenqi	Wushu	Women's 56 kg
Gold	Song Ling	Wushu	Women's 65 kg
Gold	Feng Kaijie; Liu Xiaohui; Zhang Xinyi	Wushu	Women's Single Weapon vs. Weapon
Gold	Wang Bin	Xiangqi	Men's Single Rapid
Gold	Wang Bin; Xie Jing; Shen Peng; Xu Yinchuan	Xiangqi	Men's Team Standard
Silver	Zhang Jianping; Zhao Shenzhou; Wang Zhide	Archery	Men's Team Recurve Indoor Archery
Silver	Qi Na; Lu Siyi; Li Xiaomu	Archery	Women's Team Recurve Indoor Archery
Silver	Zhuang Haitao	Athletics	Men's Field Long jump
Silver	Yang Yansheng	Athletics	Men's Field Pole vault
Silver	Liu Haili	Athletics	Women's Combined Event Pentathlon
Silver	Lin Jinmei	Boxing	Women's Light Fly Weight 48 kg
Silver	Wang Hao	Chess	Men's Single Rapid Chess
Silver	Ni Hua; Zhou Jianchao; Ding Liren; Huang Qian; Ju Wenjun; Tan Zhongyi	Chess	Team Mixed Blitz Chess
Silver	Liang Wenbo	Cue sports	Men's 6-red Snooker
Silver	Bi Zhuqing	Cue sports	Women's Single 6-red Snooker
Silver	Shao Keqiang; Yang Na	Dancesport	Pair mixed Cha Cha Cha
Silver	Zheng Cen; Wu Zhian	Dancesport	Pair mixed Waltz
Silver	Liu Xiao	E-Sports	FIFA Soccer 09
Silver	Jian Ka	Finswimming	Men's Surface 200m
Silver	Liang Yaoyue	Finswimming	Women's Surface 100m
Silver	Zhong Jiexia	Finswimming	Women's Surface 200m
Silver	Zhu Baozhen	Finswimming	Women's Surface 50m
Silver	Wang Guan	Muay	Men's Light Middle (67 – 71 kg)
Silver	Liu Jia	Muay	Women's Bantam (51 – 54 kg)
Silver	Gao Haoguang; Li Junjian; Zhang Xinyao	Shuttlecock	Men's Trio Shuttle cock
Silver	Hu Jianping	Shuttlecock	Women's Single Shuttle cock
Silver	Li Shuang	Swimming	Women's Butterfly 50m
Silver	Chen Cheng; Guo Jiarui; Li Shuang; Zhao Yuting	Swimming	Women's Team Medley Relay 4 x 50m
Silver	Wang Wei	Wushu	Women's 60 kg
Silver	Xie Jing	Xiangqi	Men's Single Rapid
Bronze	Zhao Kuansong	Athletics	Men's Field High jump
Bronze	Zhao Xue	Chess	Women's Single Rapid Chess
Bronze	Fu Xiaofang	Cue sports	Women's Single 8-ball Pool
Bronze	Shao Keqiang; Yang Na	Dancesport	Pair mixed Jive
Bronze	Yang Zheng	E-Sports	FIFA Soccer 09
Bronze	Zhang Huajun	E-Sports	NBA Live 2008
Bronze	Yang Zheng	E-Sports	Starcraft: Broodwar
Bronze	He Xuebin	E-Sports	Starcraft: Broodwar
Bronze	Miao Jingwei	Finswimming	Men's Surface 100m
Bronze	Zhou Weihang	Finswimming	Men's Surface 200m
Bronze	Yuan Haifeng; Miao Jingwei; Cen Jinlong; Jian Ka; Zhou Weihang	Finswimming	Men's Team Surface 4 × 200 m
Bronze	Yu Xin	Finswimming	Women's Surface 400m
Bronze	Wang Kang	Muay	Men's Light (57 – 60 kg)
Bronze	Gao Haoguang; Li Junjian	Shuttlecock	Men's Double Shuttle cock
Bronze	Gao Haoguang	Shuttlecock	Men's Single Shuttle cock
Bronze	Hu Jianping; Sun Liyan	Shuttlecock	Women's Double Shuttle cock
Bronze	Li Shuang	Swimming	Women's Butterfly 100m
Bronze	Chen Cheng; Guo Fan; Li Shuang; Han Wei; Zhao Yuting	Swimming	Women's Team Freestyle Relay 4 × 100 m
Bronze	Chen Cheng; Guo Fan; Xu Huiyi; Li Shuang; Han Wei; Tian Xinhe	Swimming	Women's Team Medley Relay 4 × 100 m

== See also ==
- China at the Asian Games
- China at the Olympics
- Sports in China
