= Yang Na =

Chinese surrealist artist

- Born: 9 October 1982 (age 43); Mianyang, Sichuan
- Education: Sichuan Fine Arts Institute (B.F.A. 2006, M.A. 2010)
- Known for: Oil painting, bronze sculpture
- Movement: Surrealism

Yang Na (杨纳; born 9 October 1982) is a Chinese surrealist artist based in Beijing.

Yang was born in Chongqing, and studied at the subsidiary high school of the Sichuan Fine Arts Institute (1998–2002). She studied oil painting at the Sichuan Fine Arts Institute (2002–06) and received a Master of Arts from the same institution in 2010.

== Works ==
- 2014 Lonely Mountain (oil on canvas)
- 2007 Peach Blossom Thief (160x150cm, oil on canvas)

== Exhibition ==
Solo exhibitions:

- 2015: Lonely Mountain, Taipei
- 2014: Hu'nimal, Wereldmuseum Rotterdam, Netherlands
- 2013: Roaring Waves, Museum of Medical Humanities, Taiwan
- 2010: Phoenix Tree and Bodhi Tree, Museum of Contemporary Art Taipei, Taiwan

Group Exhibitions:

- 2014: Color Dialogue, Sharjah Art Museum, United Arab Emirates
- 2013: Post-humanist Desire, Museum of Contemporary Art Taipei, Taiwan
- 2012: Future Pass, Wereldmuseum Rotterdam, Netherlands
