= 2009 Asian Indoor Games =

Multi-sport event in Vietnam

III Asian Indoor Games
- Host city: Hanoi, Vietnam
- Motto: "For A Rising Asia" (Vietnamese: Vì một châu Á phát triển)
- Nations: 42
- Athletes: 2,456
- Events: 215 in 24 sports
- Opening: 30 October
- Closing: 8 November
- Opened by: Nguyễn Minh Triết; President of Vietnam
- Torch lighter: Bùi Thị Nhung
- Main venue: Mỹ Đình National Stadium

The 2009 Asian Indoor Games (Vietnamese: Đại hội Thể thao Trong nhà châu Á 2009), officially the 3rd Asian Indoor Games (Vietnamese: Đại hội Thể thao Trong nhà châu Á lần thứ 3) and also known as Vietnam 2009, were a pancontinential indoor multi-sport event held in Vietnam from 30 October till 8 November 2009. This was the last edition of the event to be held under the "Asian Indoor Games" name before it was merged with another Olympic Council of Asia (OCA) event – Asian Martial Arts Games to form the larger Asian Indoor and Martial Arts Games.

== Mascot ==
The mascot of the 2009 event is the Ho chicken (Gà Hồ), a rare and distinctly Vietnamese breed of chicken. In Vietnamese culture, the chicken (particularly the rooster) have the five qualities of a man of honour: literacy, martial arts, physical strength, humanity and loyalty.

== Venues ==
Gà Hồ, the official mascot

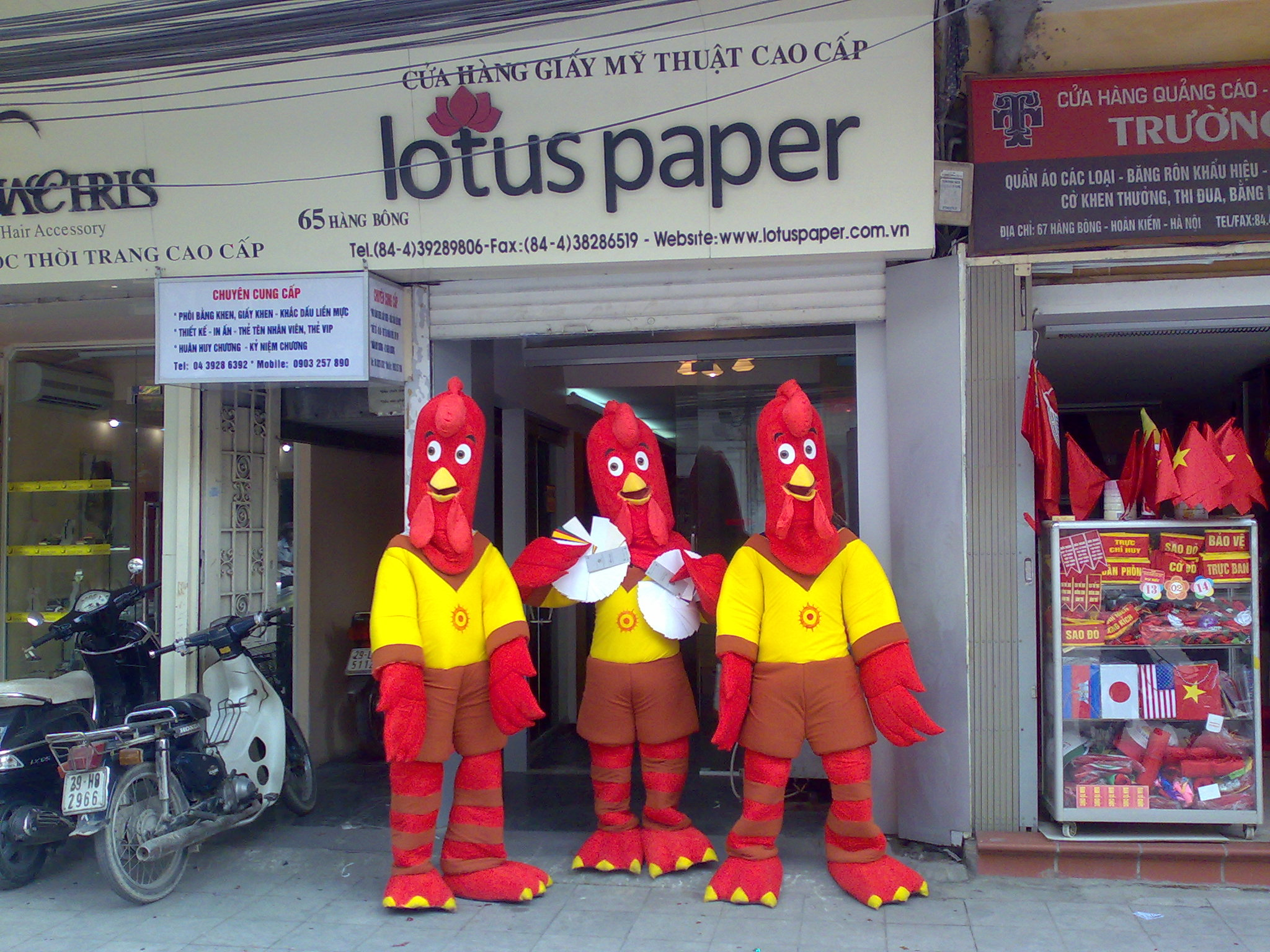
Mascots in Hanoi

- Hanoi
  - Mỹ Đình National Stadium
  - My Dinh Indoor Athletics Gymnasium
  - My Dinh National Aquatics Sports Complex
  - Quan Ngua Sports Palace
  - Tu Liem Gymnasium
  - Trinh Hoai Duc Gymnasium
  - Ha Tay Gymnasium
  - Hai Ba Trung Gymnasium
  - Cau Giay Gymnasium
  - Gia Lam Gymnasium
  - Soc Son Gymnasium
  - Gymnasium of Hanoi University of Technology
- Ho Chi Minh City
  - Tan Binh Gymnasium
  - Phú Thọ Indoor Stadium
  - Lang Binh Thang Gymnasium
  - University of Pedagogy Competition Hall
  - Rach Mieu Gymnasium
  - Van Don Gymnasium
  - Quan Khu 7 Gymnasium
  - Phan Dinh Phung Gymnasium
  - Nguyen Du Gymnasium
  - Superbowl Center
- Hai Phong
  - Haiphong Youth Gymnasium
  - Haiphong Gymnasium
- Quảng Ninh
  - Quang Ninh Gymnasium
  - Halong Pearl Halong
- Bắc Ninh
  - Bac Ninh Gymnasium
- Hải Dương
  - Haiduong Gymnasium

== Participating nations ==
All of OCA members participated in the Games, excluding: Pakistan, Palestine, & Timor-Leste. In the brackets are the total numbers of the athletes.

- Afghanistan (14)
- Bahrain (27)
- Bangladesh (7)
- Bhutan (3)
- Brunei (13)
- Cambodia (28)
- China (132)
- Chinese Taipei (70)
- Hong Kong (77)
- India (170)
- Indonesia (94)
- Iran (131)
- Iraq (42)
- Japan (94)
- Jordan (60)
- Kazakhstan (81)
- Kuwait (59)
- Kyrgyzstan (11)
- Laos (78)
- Lebanon (2)
- Macau (72)
- Malaysia (96)
- Maldives (12)
- Mongolia (37)
- Myanmar (2)
- Nepal (17)
- North Korea (3)
- Oman (19)
- Philippines (23)
- Qatar (38)
- Saudi Arabia (44)
- Singapore (39)
- South Korea (102)
- Sri Lanka (22)
- Syria (21)
- Tajikistan (17)
- Thailand (247)
- Turkmenistan (16)
- United Arab Emirates (17)
- Uzbekistan (95)
- Vietnam (321)
- Yemen (3)

=== Non-competing nations ===
Only one country just sent officials.

- Palestine

== Sports ==
The 2009 Asian Indoor Games did not feature indoor cycling, extreme sports and indoor hockey which were played in the previous games. All of the demonstration sports in the 2007 Asian Indoor Games namely, 3 on 3 basketball, kurash and kickboxing, were included in this year's Asian Indoor Games.

- 3x3 basketball (2)
- Aerobic gymnastics (4)
- Bowling (6)
- Boxing (8)
- Chess
  - Chess (4)
  - Xiangqi (2)
- Cue sports (10)
- Dancesport (10)
- Dragon & lion dance (6)
- Esports (6)
- Finswimming (16)
- Futsal (2)
- Indoor archery (8)
- Indoor athletics (26)
- Indoor kabaddi (1)
- Kickboxing (8)
- Kurash (8)
- Muaythai (9)
- Pencak silat (15)
- Pétanque (4)
- Sepak takraw (2)
- Short course swimming (30)
- Shuttlecock (6)
- Vovinam (14)
- Wushu (8)

Demonstration sports

- Ju-jitsu & belt wrestling
  - Belt wrestling (14) ()
  - Ju-jitsu (10) ()

== Calendar ==
OC	Opening ceremony	●	Event competitions	1	Event finals	CC	Closing ceremony

October / November 2009		28th Wed	29th Thu	30th Fri	31st Sat	1st Sun	2nd Mon	3rd Tue	4th Wed	5th Thu	6th Fri	7th Sat	8th Sun	Gold medals
Ceremonies				OC									CC	
3x3 basketball					●	●	●	●	●	1	1			2
Aerobic gymnastics						●	●	4						4
Bowling						1	1	1	1	●	●	2		6
Boxing				●	●	●	●		8					8
Chess	Chess				●	1	●	●	2	●	●	1		4
Chess	Xiangqi							●	●	1	●	1		2
Cue sports					●	1	2	1	1	2	1	2		10
Dancesport											5	5		10
Dragon & lion dance							2	2	2					6
Esports						1	1	2	2					6
Finswimming					5	6	5							16
Futsal		●	●	●	●	●	●		●	●	1	1		2
Indoor archery								●	●	4	4			8
Indoor athletics					6	7	13							26
Indoor kabaddi							●	●	●	●	1			1
Kickboxing								●	●	●		8		8
Kurash							2	3	3					8
Muaythai							●	●	●	●		9		9
Pencak silat							●	●	●	3		12		15
Pétanque									●	2	2			4
Sepak takraw					●	●	2							2
Short course swimming									8	7	8	7		30
Shuttlecock							●	●	2	●	2	2		6
Vovinam					6	4	4							14
Wushu									●	●	6	2		8
Total gold medals					17	21	32	13	29	20	31	52		215
October / November 2009		28th Wed	29th Thu	30th Fri	31st Sat	1st Sun	2nd Mon	3rd Tue	4th Wed	5th Thu	6th Fri	7th Sat	8th Sun	Gold medals
Ju-jitsu & belt wrestling	Belt wrestling									8	6			14
Ju-jitsu & belt wrestling	Ju-jitsu							5	5					10

== Medal table ==
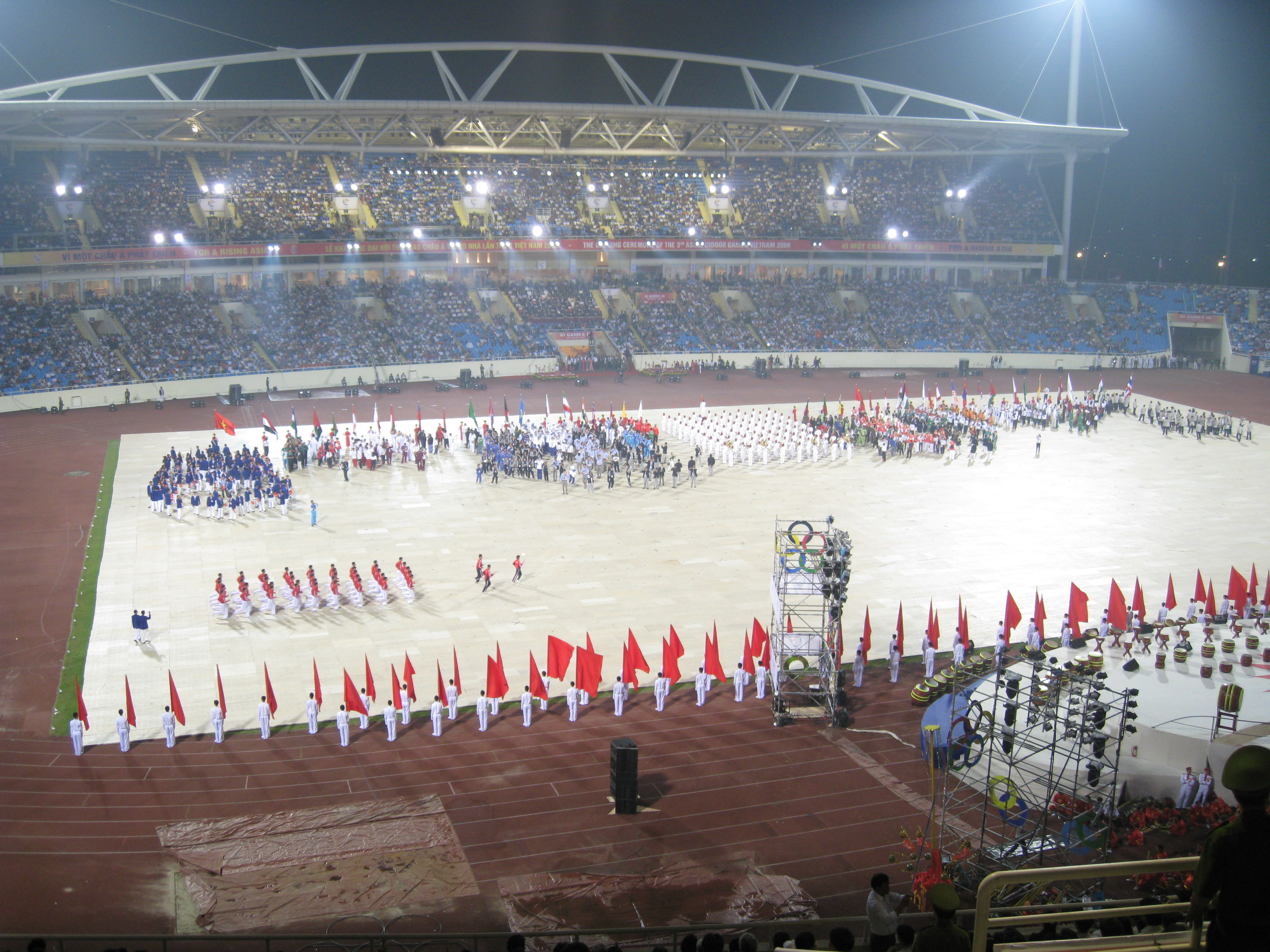
Opening ceremony at My Dinh National Stadium

* Host nation (Vietnam)

Rank	Nation	Gold	Silver	Bronze	Total
1	China (CHN)	48	25	19	92
2	Vietnam (VIE)*	42	30	22	94
3	Kazakhstan (KAZ)	21	16	21	58
4	Thailand (THA)	19	17	34	70
5	Iran (IRI)	17	15	13	45
6	South Korea (KOR)	16	14	16	46
7	India (IND)	6	9	25	40
8	Hong Kong (HKG)	6	9	17	32
9	Indonesia (INA)	6	3	14	23
10	Uzbekistan (UZB)	5	9	10	24
11	Japan (JPN)	5	9	9	23
12	Saudi Arabia (KSA)	4	3	2	9
13	Laos (LAO)	3	8	14	25
14	Chinese Taipei (TPE)	3	5	15	23
15	Malaysia (MAS)	3	5	8	16
16	United Arab Emirates (UAE)	3	0	3	6
17	Qatar (QAT)	2	3	3	8
18	Singapore (SIN)	1	7	3	11
19	Cambodia (CAM)	1	4	7	12
20	Philippines (PHI)	1	4	5	10
21	Jordan (JOR)	1	4	1	6
22	Bahrain (BRN)	1	3	1	5
23	Macau (MAC)	1	2	3	6
24	Mongolia (MGL)	0	2	5	7
25	Iraq (IRQ)	0	2	4	6
26	Afghanistan (AFG)	0	2	2	4
27	Brunei (BRU)	0	1	6	7
28	Kuwait (KUW)	0	1	4	5
29	Sri Lanka (SRI)	0	1	2	3
30	Syria (SYR)	0	1	1	2
31	Tajikistan (TJK)	0	1	0	1
32	Bangladesh (BAN)	0	0	1	1
32	Kyrgyzstan (KGZ)	0	0	1	1
32	Lebanon (LIB)	0	0	1	1
Totals (34 entries)		215	215	292	722

Preceded by Macau	Asian Indoor Games; Hanoi; III Asian Indoor Games (2009)	Succeeded by Asian Indoor and Martial Arts Games
