= Syria at the 2009 Asian Indoor Games =

- IOC code: SYR
- NOC: Syrian Olympic Committee

in Hanoi
- Competitors: 21 in 6 sports
- Medals Ranked 30th: Gold 0 Silver 1 Bronze 1 Total 2

Asian Indoor Games appearances
- 2005; 2007; 2009; 2013; 2017; 2021; 2025

Syria participated in the 2009 Asian Indoor Games in Hanoi, Vietnam on 30 October – 8 November 2009.

== Medal winners ==
Medal	Name	Sport	Event	Date
Silver	Majed Aldin Ghazal	Athletics	Men's Field High jump	
Bronze	Fadi Darwich	Kurash	Men's - 60 kg	
