= Japan at the 2009 Asian Indoor Games =

- IOC code: JPN
- NOC: Japanese Olympic Committee
- Website: www.joc.or.jp

in Hanoi, Vietnam October 30 - November 8
- Competitors: 94 in 12 sports
- Medals Ranked 11th: Gold 5 Silver 9 Bronze 9 Total 23

Asian Indoor Games appearances
- 2005; 2007; 2009; 2013; 2017; 2021; 2025

Japan participated in the 2009 Asian Indoor Games in Hanoi, Vietnam on 30 October – 8 November 2009. The nation finished eleventh in the medal table after collected 5 gold, 9 silver, and 9 bronze medals.

== Medal summary ==
=== Medal table ===
Sport	Gold	Silver	Bronze	Total
Dancesport	3	2	2	7
Finswimming	1	3	2	6
Futsal	1	0	0	1
Cue sports	0	2	1	3
Bowling	0	2	0	2
Kurash	0	0	2	2
Boxing	0	0	1	1
Muaythai	0	0	1	1
Totals (8 entries)	5	9	9	23

=== Medalists ===
Medal	Name	Sport	Event	Date
Gold	Akina Yamaoka	Finswimming	Women's 800 m surface	October 31
Gold	Ayami Kubo; Masayuki Ishihara	Dancesport	Pair mixed Waltz	November 7
Gold	Ayami Kubo; Masayuki Ishihara	Dancesport	Pair mixed Quicksteps	November 7
Gold	Rara Kubota; Yumiya Kubota	Dancesport	Pair mixed Cha-cha-cha	November 7
Gold	Azumi Fujita; Junko Yokoyama; Kana Watanabe; Mai Nagashima; Miru Utsugi; Misato Ino; Naomi Eguchi; Ryoko Miyakawa; Sakae Honda; Sayo Kikkawa; Shiori Nakajima; Shizuka Kambara; Yui Takahashi; Yuuki Kozakura	Futsal	Women's tournament	November 7
Silver	Mabi Tsukioka	Finswimming	Women's 100 m bi-fins	November 1
Silver	Maki Sano	Bowling	Women's singles	November 2
Silver	Hideaki Sakai; Tsuneyuki Masuda; Yuta Hasegawa; Yuto Uehara	Finswimming	Men's 4 × 100 m surface	November 2
Silver	Akina Yamaoka; Mabi Tsukioka; Ran Ogata; Yuka Endo	Finswimming	Women's 4 × 200 m surface	November 2
Silver	Tadashi Machida	Cue sports	Men's singles one cushion	November 5
Silver	Aiko Kowada; Ginga Morita	Dancesport	Pair mixed Paso Doble	November 6
Silver	Rara Kubota; Yumiya Kubota	Dancesport	Pair mixed Jive	November 6
Silver	Chihiro Kawahara	Cue sports	Women's singles nine ball	November 7
Silver	Kazumi Satoh; Maki Sano; Natsumi Koizumi; Rina Asada	Bowling	Women's team	November 7
Bronze	Yuta Hasegawa	Finswimming	Men's 100 m bi-fins	November 1
Bronze	Yayoi Sakamoto	Finswimming	Women's 100 m bi-fins	November 1
Bronze	Ryuji Umeda	Cue sports	Men's singles three cushion	November 2
Bronze	Chisato Mizuno	Boxing	Women's bantamweight	November 2
Bronze	Ikkei Nagamitsu	Muaythai	Women's 54 kg	November 3
Bronze	Kohei Yoshioka	Kurash	Men's -81 kg	November 4
Bronze	Masato Ishizaki	Kurash	Men's -90 kg	November 4
Bronze	Mariko Shibahara; Tsuyoshi Nukina	Dancesport	Pair mixed Slow Foxtrot	November 6
Bronze	Aiko Kowada; Ginga Morita	Dancesport	Pair mixed Samba	November 6
