= Vietnam at the 2009 Asian Indoor Games =

- IOC code: VIE
- NOC: Vietnam Olympic Committee
- Competitors: 321 in 26 sports
- Medals Ranked 2nd: Gold 42 Silver 30 Bronze 22 Total 94

Asian Indoor Games appearances
- 2005; 2007; 2009; 2013; 2017; 2021; 2025

Vietnam participated in the 2009 Asian Indoor Games held in Hanoi, Vietnam from October 28 to November 8 with 407 athletes competing in all sport events and one demonstrative event. It won 42 gold, 30 silver and 22 bronze medals.

== Medalists ==
Medal	Name	Sport	Event	Date
Gold	Vũ Thị Hương	Athletics	Women's Track 60m	October 31
Gold	Nguyễn Trung Kiên	Fin Swimming	Men's Surface 100m	October 31
Gold	Phạm Thị Phượng & Nguyễn Văn Cường	Vovinam	Women's Self-Defence	October 31
Gold	Nguyễn Văn Cường, Phan Ngọc Tới, Nguyễn Bình Định & Nguyễn Khắc Nguyên	Vovinam	Men's Attacking Performance by Leg	October 31
Gold	Thân Lại Kim Long	Vovinam	Men's Fighting 55 kg	October 31
Gold	Phan Thị Ngọc Hân	Vovinam	Women's Fighting 55 kg	October 31
Gold	Trần Thanh Sơn, Võ Trần Hoàng Mai, Nguyễn Văn Thới, & Cao Vũ Linh	Vovinam	Men's Multi-Weapon Performance	October 31
Silver	Lê Thị Phương	Athletics	Women's Field Pole vault	October 31
Silver	Phan Lưu Cẩm Thành	Fin Swimming	Men's Surface 100m	October 31
Silver	Bùi Đình Khá	Fin Swimming	Men's Surface 800m	October 31
Silver	Nguyễn Thị Thương	Fin Swimming	Women's Surface 800m	October 31
Bronze	Trương Thanh Hằng	Athletics	Women's Track 1.500m	October 31
Bronze	Võ Thị Kiều	Fin Swimming	Women's Surface 800m	October 31
Bronze	Lưu Thị Phương	Fin Swimming	Women's Team Surface 4 × 100 m	October 31
