= Iran at the 2009 Asian Indoor Games =

Asian Indoor Games

- IOC code: IRI
- NOC: National Olympic Committee of the Islamic Republic of Iran

in Hanoi
- Competitors: 125 in 15 sports
- Flag bearer: Sajjad Moradi
- Medals Ranked 5th: Gold 17 Silver 15 Bronze 13 Total 45

Asian Indoor Games appearances
- 2005; 2007; 2009; 2013; 2017; 2021; 2026

Iran participated in the 2009 Asian Indoor Games held in Hanoi, Vietnam from October 30, 2009 to November 8, 2009.

== Competitors ==
Sport	Men	Women	Total
3x3 basketball	4		4
Chess	3	3	6
Esports	7		7
Futsal	14	14	28
Indoor archery	8	8	16
Indoor athletics	12	2	14
Indoor kabaddi	7		7
Kickboxing	4	2	6
Kurash	3	2	5
Muaythai	3		3
Pencak silat	3		3
Sepak takraw	6		6
Short course swimming	6		6
Vovinam	5	2	7
Wushu		7	7
Total	85	40	125

== Medal summary ==
=== Medals by sport ===
Sport	Gold	Silver	Bronze	Total
3x3 basketball	1			1
Chess			1	1
Esports	2	1	1	4
Futsal	1			1
Indoor archery	3	1	4	8
Indoor athletics	3			3
Indoor kabaddi		1		1
Kickboxing	2	2		4
Kurash	2	1		3
Muaythai	1		1	2
Pencak silat		2	1	3
Sepak takraw			1	1
Short course swimming		1	1	2
Vovinam	1	3	3	7
Wushu	1	3		4
Total	17	15	13	45

=== Medalists ===
Medal	Name	Sport	Event
Gold	Mehdi Kamrani; Hamed Afagh; Oshin Sahakian; Samad Nikkhah Bahrami	3x3 basketball	Men
Gold	Davoud Khoei	Esports	Open FIFA
Gold	Tohid Ghorbanifar	Esports	Open NBA Live
Gold	Mohammad Mehdi Katebi; Taha Mortazavi; Hamid Ahmadi; Ali Kiaei; Ali Asghar Hassanzadeh; Shahram Sharifzadeh; Masoud Daneshvar; Mostafa Tayyebi; Ahmad Mollaali; Sajjad Bandi; Mehdi Javid; Ahmad Esmaeilpour; Mojtaba Nassirnia; Alireza Samimi	Futsal	Men
Gold	Reza Zamaninejad	Indoor archery	Men's individual compound
Gold	Reza Zamaninejad; Abdollah Kiaei; Mohammad Ali Karimi	Indoor archery	Men's team compound
Gold	Mahtab Parsamehr; Ensieh Haji Anzehaei; Akram Shabani	Indoor archery	Women's team compound
Gold	Sajjad Moradi	Indoor athletics	Men's 800 m
Gold	Amin Nikfar	Indoor athletics	Men's shot put
Gold	Leila Rajabi	Indoor athletics	Women's shot put
Gold	Mehdi Jalilnavaz	Kickboxing	Men's low kick 51 kg
Gold	Jamshid Asghar-Givehchi	Kickboxing	Men's low kick 75 kg
Gold	Mostafa Dalirian	Kurash	Men's 60 kg
Gold	Hossein Ghomi	Kurash	Men's 90 kg
Gold	Vahid Roshani	Muaythai	Men's 71 kg
Gold	Alireza Jadidi	Vovinam	Men's 65 kg
Gold	Zahra Karimi	Wushu	Women's sanshou 60 kg
Silver	Farzan Homaei	Esports	Open NBA Live
Silver	Mahtab Parsamehr	Indoor archery	Women's individual compound
Silver	Mohammad Bagher Mazandarani; Nasser Roumiani; Reza Kamali Moghaddam; Ehsan Zamani; Ramezan Ali Paeinmahalli; Mostafa Nodehi; Farhad Kamal Gharibi	Indoor kabaddi	Men
Silver	Mohammad Nezami	Kickboxing	Men's low kick 67 kg
Silver	Farinaz Lari	Kickboxing	Women's low kick 52 kg
Silver	Toktam Bidel	Kurash	Women's 63 kg
Silver	Saeid Salehi	Pencak silat	Men's tanding 65 kg
Silver	Masoud Ghiasifar	Pencak silat	Men's tanding 75 kg
Silver	Mohammad Bidarian; Emin Noshadi; Pasha Vahdati; Saeid Maleka Ashtiani	Short course swimming	Men's 4 × 100 m freestyle relay
Silver	Mohammad Hossein Mirakhori	Vovinam	Men's 60 kg
Silver	Morteza Farnad	Vovinam	Men's 70 kg
Silver	Monir Ahmadi	Vovinam	Women's dragon tiger form
Silver	Khadijeh Zeinalzadeh	Wushu	Women's sanshou 48 kg
Silver	Maryam Tavakkoli	Wushu	Women's sanshou 56 kg
Silver	Fatemeh Dehghani	Wushu	Women's sanshou 70 kg
Bronze	Ehsan Ghaemmaghami; Elshan Moradi; Morteza Mahjoub; Atousa Pourkashian; Shadi Paridar; Shayesteh Ghaderpour	Chess	Mixed team blitz
Bronze	Naeim Hedayati	Esports	Open Need for Speed
Bronze	Majid Mirrahimi	Indoor archery	Men's individual recurve
Bronze	Majid Mirrahimi; Keivan Riazimehr; Nader Manouchehri	Indoor archery	Men's team recurve
Bronze	Mansour Kordi	Indoor archery	Men's individual compound
Bronze	Najmeh Abtin; Yasaman Shirian; Farnoush Shaghaghi	Indoor archery	Women's team recurve
Bronze	Hossein Nassiri	Muaythai	Men's 51 kg
Bronze	Mehdi Ahadzadeh	Pencak silat	Men's tanding 80 kg
Bronze	Bahman Abdevali; Eslam Gharehmoshk; Majed Sarlak; Majid Salmani; Mohammad Rezaei; Mohsen Padidar	Sepak takraw	Men's hoop
Bronze	Saeid Maleka Ashtiani; Mohammad Alirezaei; Gamer Dilanchian; Mohammad Bidarian	Short course swimming	Men's 4 × 50 m medley relay
Bronze	Mohsen Ahmadi	Vovinam	Men's five gate form
Bronze	Reza Azordeh; Morteza Farnad; Alireza Jadidi; Mohsen Ahmadi	Vovinam	Men's multiple weapon
Bronze	Razieh Roustaei	Vovinam	Women's 55 kg

== Results by event ==
=== 3x3 basketball ===
Athlete	Event	Preliminary round					Semifinal	Final	Rank
Athlete	Event	Round 1	Round 2	Round 3	Round 4	Rank	Semifinal	Final	Rank
Mehdi Kamrani; Hamed Afagh; Oshin Sahakian; Samad Nikkhah Bahrami	Men	Afghanistan; W 33–6	Saudi Arabia; W 33–24	Uzbekistan; W 33–11	Vietnam; W 33–16	1 Q	India; W 33–19	Saudi Arabia; W 33–9	1st place, gold medalist(s)

=== Chess ===
Individual rapid

Athlete	Event	Swiss round									Semifinal	Final	Rank
Athlete	Event	Round 1	Round 2	Round 3	Round 4	Round 5	Round 6	Round 7	Round 8	Round 9	Semifinal	Final	Rank
Ehsan Ghaemmaghami	Men	Saad (JOR); W 1–0	Mahdi (AFG); W 1–0	Sasikiran (IND); D ½–½	Nguyễn (VIE); W 1–0	Wang (CHN); L 0–1	Antonio (PHI); W 1–0	Kazhgaleyev (KAZ); L 0–1	Bu (CHN); L 0–1	Al-Sayed (QAT); L 0–1	Did not advance		18
Elshan Moradi	Men	Ali (MDV); W 1–0	Sasikiran (IND); D ½–½	Filippov (UZB); W 1–0	Harikrishna (IND); L 0–1	Al-Sayed (QAT); L 0–1	Ali (IRQ); W 1–0	Erkhembayar (MGL); W 1–0	Wang (CHN); L 0–1	Khamrakulov (UZB); D ½–½	Did not advance		9
Shadi Paridar	Women	Chen (TPE); W 1–0	Hou (CHN); L 0–1	Uchida (JPN); W 1–0	Mohamed (MDV); W 1–0	Muminova (UZB); L 0–1	Perena (PHI); L 0–1	Ismael (IRQ); W 1–0	Enkhtuul (MGL); W 1–0	Hoàng (VIE); W 1–0	Did not advance		6
Atousa Pourkashian	Women	Al-Attar (JOR); W 1–0	Sabirova (UZB); W 1–0	Otgonjargal (MGL); W WO	Hou (CHN); L 0–1	Otgonjargal (MGL); D ½–½	Zhu (QAT); L 0–1	Nadig (IND); D ½–½	Phạm (VIE); D ½–½	Nakhbayeva (KAZ); L 0–1	Did not advance		17

Mixed team

Athlete	Event	Swiss round									Semifinal	Final	Rank
Athlete	Event	Round 1	Round 2	Round 3	Round 4	Round 5	Round 6	Round 7	Round 8	Round 9	Semifinal	Final	Rank
Ehsan Ghaemmaghami; Elshan Moradi; Morteza Mahjoub; Atousa Pourkashian; Shadi Paridar; Shayesteh Ghaderpour	Blitz	Iraq; W 4–0	India; L 1–3	Kazakhstan; W 3–1	Vietnam; L 1½–2½	Qatar; D 2–2	Mongolia; W 4–0	China; D 2–2	Nepal; W 4–0	Philippines; W 2½–1½	China; L 4–4 (1–2)	Did not advance	3rd place, bronze medalist(s)
Ehsan Ghaemmaghami; Elshan Moradi; Morteza Mahjoub; Atousa Pourkashian; Shadi Paridar; Shayesteh Ghaderpour	Rapid	Jordan; W 4–0	China; L 1–3	Qatar; L 1½–2½	Mongolia; W 3–1	Philippines; W 3½–½	India; L 1–3	Iraq; W 3½–½	Vietnam; L 1–3	Uzbekistan; D 2–2	Did not advance		8

=== Esports ===
Athlete	Event	Preliminary round / Round robin					Quarterfinal	Semifinal	Final	Rank
Athlete	Event	Round 1	Round 2	Round 3	Round 4	Rank	Quarterfinal	Semifinal	Final	Rank
Meisam Hosseini	FIFA	Lkhagvasüren (MGL); W 3–0	Kim (KOR); W 2–1	Al-Ghazali (BRN); W WO	—N/a	1 Q	Liu (CHN); L 1–2	Did not advance		5
Davoud Khoei	FIFA	Al-Meghaiseeb (QAT); W 3–0	Agarwal (IND); W 3–0	Yang (CHN); L 1–2	—N/a	2 Q	Phạm (VIE); W 2–0	Tô (VIE); W 2–0	Liu (CHN); W 2–1	1st place, gold medalist(s)
Tohid Ghorbanifar	NBA Live	Zhang (CHN); W 3–0	Homaei (IRI); L 1–2	Al-Meghaiseeb (QAT); W 2–1	—N/a	1st place, gold medalist(s)	—N/a			
Farzan Homaei	NBA Live	Al-Meghaiseeb (QAT); W 3–0	Ghorbanifar (IRI); W 2–1	Zhang (CHN); L 1–2	—N/a	2nd place, silver medalist(s)	—N/a			
Naeim Hedayati	Need for Speed	Shamuzafarov (UZB); W 2–1	Hooda (IND); W 2–0	Nguyễn (VIE); W 2–0	He (CHN); L 1–2	2 Q	—N/a	Nguyễn (VIE); L 1–2	Abdullaev (UZB); W 2–0	3rd place, bronze medalist(s)
Mehdi Nazari	Need for Speed	Abdullaev (UZB); L 0–2	Tomar (IND); W 2–0	Nguyễn (VIE); L 0–2	Al-Romaihi (QAT); W 2–0	3	—N/a	Did not advance		5
Farzan Homaei; Davoud Khoei; Saman Rashidi; Mehdi Nazari	Counter-Strike	Vietnam; L WO	Mongolia; L WO	South Korea; L WO	Uzbekistan; L WO	5	—N/a			

=== Futsal ===
Team	Event	Preliminary round			Quarterfinal	Semifinal	Final	Rank
Team	Event	Round 1	Round 2	Rank	Quarterfinal	Semifinal	Final	Rank
Iran	Men	Turkmenistan; W 8–3	Macau; W 24–0	1 Q	Malaysia; W 16–1	Turkmenistan; W 13–0	Thailand; W 3–3, 5–4 Pen	1st place, gold medalist(s)
Iran	Women	Uzbekistan; W 6–1	Japan; W 3–2	1 Q	—N/a	Jordan; L 1–2	3rd place match Thailand; L 4–5	4
Roster – Men: Mohammad Mehdi Katebi; Taha Mortazavi; Hamid Ahmadi; Ali Kiaei; Ali Asghar Hassanzadeh; Shahram Sharifzadeh; Masoud Daneshvar; Mostafa Tayyebi; Ahmad Mollaali; Sajjad Bandi; Mehdi Javid; Ahmad Esmaeilpour; Mojtaba Nassirnia; Alireza Samimi; Coach: (Brazil) Jurandir Dutra Roster – Women: Farzaneh Tavassoli; Zivar Babaei; Azizeh Karimipour; Fatemeh Sharif; Fereshteh Karimi; Fatemeh Arjangi; Soheila Malmoli; Leila Eghbali; Nasimeh Gholami; Fahimeh Zareei; Fatemeh Etedadi; Arezoo Sadaghianizadeh; Shiva Amini; Behnaz Khayyat; Coach: (Ukraine) Lyudmila Pokotilo

=== Indoor archery ===
Recurve

Athlete	Event	Ranking round		Round of 32	Round of 16	Quarterfinal	Semifinal	Final	Rank
Athlete	Event	Score	Rank	Round of 32	Round of 16	Quarterfinal	Semifinal	Final	Rank
Akbar Bastan	Men's individual	567	20	Did not advance					32
Nader Manouchehri	Men's individual	575	12	Did not advance					28
Majid Mirrahimi	Men's individual	582	6 Q	Bye	Suprianto (INA); W 118–113	Riazimehr (IRI); W 117–115	Kim (KOR); L 112–116	3rd place match Sulistyawan (INA); W 113–110	3rd place, bronze medalist(s)
Keivan Riazimehr	Men's individual	581	7 Q	Bye	Đào (VIE); W 112–109	Mirrahimi (IRI); L 115–117	Did not advance		5
Majid Mirrahimi; Keivan Riazimehr; Nader Manouchehri; Akbar Bastan	Men's team	1738	2 Q	—N/a	Bye	Indonesia; W 233–223	China; L 228–231	3rd place match India; W 230–230 (29–28 SO)	3rd place, bronze medalist(s)
Najmeh Abtin	Women's individual	543	20	—N/a	Did not advance				21
Zahra Dehghan	Women's individual	527	22	—N/a	Did not advance				23
Farnoush Shaghaghi	Women's individual	552	13 Q	—N/a	Shirian (IRI); L 109–112	Did not advance			12
Yasaman Shirian	Women's individual	563	10 Q	—N/a	Shaghaghi (IRI); W 112–109	Lu (CHN); W 116–114	An (KOR); L 114–116	3rd place match Yu (KOR); L 107–116	4
Najmeh Abtin; Yasaman Shirian; Farnoush Shaghaghi; Zahra Dehghan	Women's team	1658	3 Q	—N/a		Mongolia; W 219–210	China; L 221–229	3rd place match Vietnam; W 230–221	3rd place, bronze medalist(s)

Compound

Athlete	Event	Ranking round		Round of 16	Quarterfinal	Semifinal	Final	Rank
Athlete	Event	Score	Rank	Round of 16	Quarterfinal	Semifinal	Final	Rank
Mohammad Ali Karimi	Men's individual	566	12	Did not advance				19
Abdollah Kiaei	Men's individual	575	5	Did not advance				16
Mansour Kordi	Men's individual	580	2 Q	Al-Otaibi (KSA); W 118–107	Verma (IND); W 113–113 (28–27 SO)	Nguyễn (VIE); L 114–114 (18–19 SO)	3rd place match Chinglensana (IND); W 112–110	3rd place, bronze medalist(s)
Reza Zamaninejad	Men's individual	585	1 Q	Bye	Nguyễn (VIE); W 118–116	Chinglensana (IND); W 117–111	Nguyễn (VIE); W 118–113	1st place, gold medalist(s)
Reza Zamaninejad; Abdollah Kiaei; Mohammad Ali Karimi; Mansour Kordi	Men's team	1726	1 Q	—N/a	Bye	Vietnam; W 228–223	Thailand; W 228–219	1st place, gold medalist(s)
Sakineh Ghasempour	Women's individual	545	15	Did not advance				16
Ensieh Haji Anzehaei	Women's individual	570	1 Q	Bye	Tinbua (THA); L 113–113 (18–19 SO)	Did not advance		5
Mahtab Parsamehr	Women's individual	560	7 Q	Bye	Besra (IND); W 117–108	Detchokul (THA); W 112–111	Tinbua (THA); L 112–113	2nd place, silver medalist(s)
Akram Shabani	Women's individual	559	8	Did not advance				12
Mahtab Parsamehr; Ensieh Haji Anzehaei; Akram Shabani; Sakineh Ghasempour	Women's team	1689	2 Q	—N/a	Bye	India; W 225–224	Thailand; W 226–219	1st place, gold medalist(s)

=== Indoor athletics ===
Track & Field

Athlete	Event	Round 1		Semifinal		Final	Rank
Athlete	Event	Time	Rank	Time	Rank	Time / Result	Rank
Amir Piaho	Men's 60 m	DNS	—	Did not advance			—
Reza Bouazar	Men's 400 m	48.44	1 Q	47.94	2 Q	DNF	—
Amir Moradi	Men's 800 m	1:57.87	2 Q	—N/a		1:51.28	4
Sajjad Moradi	Men's 800 m	1:51.49	2 Q	—N/a		1:48.48 GR	1st place, gold medalist(s)
Amir Moradi	Men's 1500 m	DNF	—	—N/a		Did not advance	—
Sajjad Moradi	Men's 1500 m	DNS	—	—N/a		Did not advance	—
Rouhollah Asgari	Men's 60 m hurdles	DNF	—	—N/a		Did not advance	—
Eshagh Ghaffari	Men's pole vault	—N/a				5.00 m	6
Mohsen Rabbani	Men's pole vault	—N/a				5.10 m	4
Mohammad Arzandeh	Men's long jump	—N/a				7.60 m	6
Behrouz Sistanipour	Men's long jump	—N/a				7.28 m	12
Amin Nikfar	Men's shot put	—N/a				19.66 m GR	1st place, gold medalist(s)
Mehdi Shahrokhi	Men's shot put	—N/a				18.32 m	6
Leila Ebrahimi	Women's 1500 m	—N/a				4:26.10	4
Leila Ebrahimi	Women's 3000 m	—N/a				9:51.08	5
Leila Rajabi	Women's shot put	—N/a				17.07 m	1st place, gold medalist(s)

Combined

Athlete	Event	60m	LJ	SP	HJ	60mH	PV	1000m	Total	Rank
Hadi Sepehrzad	Men's heptathlon	7.14; 833	6.64 m 727	15.63 m 828	1.88 m 696	8.33; 900	3.90 m 590	3:06.60; 601	5175	5

=== Indoor kabaddi ===
Team	Event	Preliminary round				Semifinal	Final	Rank
Team	Event	Round 1	Round 2	Round 3	Rank	Semifinal	Final	Rank
Iran	Men	Thailand; W 68–23	Malaysia; W 80–19	Bangladesh; W 51–30	1 Q	Sri Lanka; W 61–19	India; L 33–57	2nd place, silver medalist(s)
Roster: Mohammad Bagher Mazandarani; Nasser Roumiani; Reza Kamali Moghaddam; Ehsan Zamani; Ramezan Ali Paeinmahalli; Mostafa Nodehi; Farhad Kamal Gharibi; Coach: (India) Ashan Kumar

=== Kickboxing ===
Athlete	Event	Round of 16	Quarterfinal	Semifinal	Final	Rank
Mehran Feizollahi	Men's point fighting 63 kg	—N/a	Al-Mathkori (KUW); L 3–11	Did not advance		5
Mehdi Jalilnavaz	Men's low kick 51 kg	—N/a	Bye	Kumar (IND); W 3–0	Nguyễn (VIE); W 2–1	1st place, gold medalist(s)
Mohammad Nezami	Men's low kick 67 kg	Bye	Hammoud (IRQ); W 2–1	Meitei (IND); W 3–0	Zhakupov (KAZ); L KO	2nd place, silver medalist(s)
Jamshid Asghar-Givehchi	Men's low kick 75 kg	—N/a	Kaenjanbai (THA); W RSC	Artykbayev (KAZ); W 2–1	Al-Wahash (JOR); W 3–0	1st place, gold medalist(s)
Tahereh Eslamian	Women's point fighting 50 kg	—N/a	Đào (VIE); L 4–11	Did not advance		5
Farinaz Lari	Women's low kick 52 kg	—N/a	Bye	Zhamalova (KAZ); W 3–0	Nguyễn (VIE); L 0–3	2nd place, silver medalist(s)

=== Kurash ===
Athlete	Event	Round of 16	Quarterfinal	Semifinal	Final	Rank
Mostafa Dalirian	Men's 60 kg	—N/a	Gonchigsumlaa (MGL); W	Ho (TPE); W	Wahedi (AFG); W 100–000	1st place, gold medalist(s)
Mohammad Jamali	Men's 81 kg	—N/a	Kholmamatov (UZB); L 001–101	Did not advance		5
Hossein Ghomi	Men's 90 kg	Bye	Kumar (IND); W 114–000	Ahmadi (AFG); W 100–000	Sobirov (TJK); W 010–002	1st place, gold medalist(s)
Akram Khani	Women's 57 kg	—N/a	Kutsenko (KAZ); L 011–012	Did not advance		5
Toktam Bidel	Women's 63 kg	—N/a	Gahlot (IND); W 111–010	Nguyễn (VIE); W 010–001	Hamdamova (UZB); L 001–003	2nd place, silver medalist(s)

=== Muaythai ===
Athlete	Event	Round of 16	Quarterfinal	Semifinal	Final	Rank
Hossein Nassiri	Men's 51 kg	—N/a	Fong (MAC); W RSCO	Seuaphom (LAO); L 0–5	Did not advance	3rd place, bronze medalist(s)
Yaser Samadi	Men's 60 kg	Uchida (JPN); L 2–3	Did not advance			9
Vahid Roshani	Men's 71 kg	—N/a	Salman (LIB); W 5–0	Al-Azemi (KUW); W RSCO	Wang (CHN); W 4–1	1st place, gold medalist(s)

=== Pencak silat ===
Athlete	Event	Quarterfinal	Semifinal	Final	Rank
Saeid Salehi	Men's 65 kg	Norov (UZB); W 5–0	Ahmad (BRU); W 4–1	Sodik (INA); L 0–5	2nd place, silver medalist(s)
Masoud Ghiasifar	Men's 75 kg	Bye	Ali Umar (BRU); W TW	Mulyono (INA); L 0–5	2nd place, silver medalist(s)
Mehdi Ahadzadeh	Men's 80 kg	Bye	Juanda (SIN); L 0–5	Did not advance	3rd place, bronze medalist(s)

=== Sepak takraw ===
Athlete	Event	Round 1		Round 2		Semifinal	Final	Rank
Athlete	Event	Score	Rank	Score	Rank	Semifinal	Final	Rank
Bahman Abdevali; Eslam Gharehmoshk; Majed Sarlak; Majid Salmani; Mohammad Rezaei; Mohsen Padidar	Men's hoop	570	3 Q	620	3 Q	Indonesia; L 670–690	Did not advance	3rd place, bronze medalist(s)

=== Short course swimming ===
Athlete	Event	Heats		Final	
Athlete	Event	Time	Rank	Time	Rank
Mohammad Bidarian	Men's 50 m freestyle	22.74	3 Q	22.97	7
Pasha Vahdati	Men's 50 m freestyle	22.90	5 Q	22.83	5
Mohammad Bidarian	Men's 100 m freestyle	50.14	5 Q	49.10	5
Emin Noshadi	Men's 100 m freestyle	50.36	8 Q	49.94	7
Saeid Maleka Ashtiani	Men's 200 m freestyle	1:50.37	8 Q	1:49.19	6
Emin Noshadi	Men's 200 m freestyle	1:51.66	12	Did not advance	
Mohammad Alirezaei	Men's 50 m breaststroke	28.65	8 Q	27.78	5
Mohammad Alirezaei	Men's 100 m breaststroke	1:01.88	5 Q	1:01.35	4
Gamer Dilanchian	Men's 50 m butterfly	25.46	14	Did not advance	
Gamer Dilanchian	Men's 100 m butterfly	56.68	16	Did not advance	
Emin Noshadi	Men's 100 m butterfly	55.85	15	Did not advance	
Saeid Maleka Ashtiani	Men's 100 m individual medley	56.98	5 Q	56.33	6
Saeid Maleka Ashtiani	Men's 200 m individual medley	2:03.75	6 Q	2:01.12	4
Emin Noshadi; Gamer Dilanchian; Pasha Vahdati; Mohammad Bidarian	Men's 4 × 50 m freestyle relay	1:31.16	2 Q	1:29.90	4
Mohammad Bidarian; Emin Noshadi; Pasha Vahdati; Saeid Maleka Ashtiani	Men's 4 × 100 m freestyle relay	3:21.30	2 Q	3:17.81	2nd place, silver medalist(s)
Saeid Maleka Ashtiani; Mohammad Alirezaei; Gamer Dilanchian; Mohammad Bidarian; Emin Noshadi (heats)	Men's 4 × 50 m medley relay	1:42.14	3 Q	1:40.02	3rd place, bronze medalist(s)
Saeid Maleka Ashtiani; Mohammad Alirezaei; Emin Noshadi; Mohammad Bidarian; Gamer Dilanchian (heats); Pasha Vahdati (heats)	Men's 4 × 100 m medley relay	3:51.40	6 Q	3:43.93	6

=== Vovinam ===
Performance

Athlete	Event	Score	Rank
Mohsen Ahmadi	Men's five gate form	276	3rd place, bronze medalist(s)
Reza Azordeh; Morteza Farnad; Alireza Jadidi; Mohsen Ahmadi	Men's multiple weapon	268	3rd place, bronze medalist(s)
Monir Ahmadi	Women's dragon tiger form	279	2nd place, silver medalist(s)

Fighting

Athlete	Event	Semifinal	Final	Rank
Mohammad Hossein Mirakhori	Men's 60 kg	Nuth (CAM); W KO	Võ (VIE); L 4–12	2nd place, silver medalist(s)
Alireza Jadidi	Men's 65 kg	Moirangthem (IND); W 6–−2	Khamphi (LAO); W 10–−2	1st place, gold medalist(s)
Morteza Farnad	Men's 70 kg	Vandoengkoe (LAO); W DSQ	Nguyễn (VIE); L 2–4	2nd place, silver medalist(s)
Razieh Roustaei	Women's 55 kg	Phan (VIE); L −2–9	Did not advance	3rd place, bronze medalist(s)

=== Wushu ===
Taolu

Athlete	Event	Score	Rank
Mitra Abbasi; Mahboubeh Karimi; Arghavan Jalali	Women's duilian weapons	9.09	6

Sanshou

Athlete	Event	Quarterfinal	Semifinal	Final	Rank
Khadijeh Zeinalzadeh	Women's 48 kg	Bye	Chao (HKG); W 2–0	Nguyễn (VIE); L 0–2	2nd place, silver medalist(s)
Maryam Tavakkoli	Women's 56 kg	—N/a	Devi (IND); W 2–0	Shi (CHN); L 0–2	2nd place, silver medalist(s)
Zahra Karimi	Women's 60 kg	—N/a	Round robin Ahmed (IRQ); W WO	Round robin Wang (CHN); W 2–0	1st place, gold medalist(s)
Fatemeh Dehghani	Women's 70 kg	—N/a	Round robin Nguyễn (VIE); L 0–2	Round robin Jaiwanti (IND); W 2–0	2nd place, silver medalist(s)

== Demonstration sports ==
=== Belt wrestling ===
Freestyle

Athlete	Event	Round robin				Rank
Athlete	Event	Round 1	Round 2	Round 3	Round 4	Rank
Mohammad Rahattalab	Men's 73 kg	Tanaka (JPN); L WO	Umarov (UZB); L WO	Ngô (VIE); L WO	Pürev-Ochir (MGL); L WO	5
Mohammad Mansouri Davar	Men's 81 kg	Đỗ (VIE); W 6–0	Dagvadorj (MGL); W Fall	Artikov (UZB); L Fall	Salavat Uulu (KGZ); L Fall	3rd place, bronze medalist(s)
Reza Abdoli	Men's 90 kg	Hussein (IRQ); W Fall	Tuychiev (UZB); L	Ahmadi (AFG); W Fall	Đoàn (VIE); W Fall	1st place, gold medalist(s)
Mehdi Ebrahimi	Men's 100 kg	Abdul-Hussein (IRQ); W Fall	Phạm (VIE); W Fall	Jargalsaikhan (MGL); W WO	—N/a	1st place, gold medalist(s)
Hadi Rafiei	Men's +100 kg	Hasan (IRQ); W Fall	Bozorov (UZB); L Fall	—N/a		2nd place, silver medalist(s)

Classic style

Athlete	Event	Round robin				Rank
Athlete	Event	Round 1	Round 2	Round 3	Round 4	Rank
Mohammad Rahattalab	Men's 73 kg	Fufachev (KGZ); L WO	Tanaka (JPN); L WO	Ngô (VIE); L WO	—N/a	3rd place, bronze medalist(s)
Mohammad Mansouri Davar	Men's 81 kg	Salavat Uulu (KGZ); L Fall	Đỗ (VIE); W Fall	Umarov (UZB); L Fall	—N/a	3rd place, bronze medalist(s)
Reza Abdoli	Men's 90 kg	Đoàn (VIE); W Fall	Hussein (IRQ); W 5–0	Artikov (UZB); L 4–5	Ahmadi (AFG); W Fall	2nd place, silver medalist(s)
Mohammad Asgari	Men's 100 kg	Abdul-Hussein (IRQ); L Fall	Phạm (VIE); L 0–2	Tuychiev (UZB); W Fall	—N/a	3rd place, bronze medalist(s)
Hadi Rafiei	Men's +100 kg	Bozorov (UZB); L 2–4	Hasan (IRQ); W WO	—N/a		2nd place, silver medalist(s)

=== Ju-jitsu ===
Athlete	Event	Semifinal	Final	Rank
Mohammad Rahattalab; Amir Houshang Hamsayeh	Men's duo	Round robin Vietnam; W 81–72	Round robin Iraq; W 72–62	1st place, gold medalist(s)
Mohammad Rahattalab	Men's fighting 69 kg	Phan (VIE); W 8–0	Abdat (SIN); W 10–3	1st place, gold medalist(s)
Mohammad Mansouri Davar	Men's fighting 77 kg	Bye	Trận (VIE); W 14–0	1st place, gold medalist(s)
Reza Abdoli	Men's fighting 85 kg	—N/a	Kamal (IRQ); W 3–2	1st place, gold medalist(s)
Mehdi Ebrahimi	Men's fighting 94 kg	—N/a	Hussein (IRQ); W 13–3	1st place, gold medalist(s)
Hadi Rafiei	Men's fighting +94 kg	Round robin Ngô (VIE); W 7–3	Round robin Hasan (IRQ); W 3–2	1st place, gold medalist(s)
Akram Khani	Women's fighting +70 kg	—N/a	Trần (VIE); L 3–4	2nd place, silver medalist(s)
