= Kurash at the 2009 Asian Indoor Games =

- Venue: Gia Lâm Gymnasium
- Dates: 2–4 November 2009

Kurash at the 2009 Asian Indoor Games was held in Gia Lâm Gymnasium, Hanoi, Vietnam from 2 November to 4 November 2009.

== Medalists ==
=== Men ===
Event	Gold	Silver	Bronze
−60 kg	Mostafa Dalirian; Iran	Abdul Wahed Wahedi; Afghanistan	Fadi Darwish; Syria
−60 kg	Mostafa Dalirian; Iran	Abdul Wahed Wahedi; Afghanistan	Ho Chih-yi; Chinese Taipei
−66 kg	Meirzhan Kaltayev; Kazakhstan	Hsu Peng-yao; Chinese Taipei	Elbek Ochilov; Uzbekistan
−66 kg	Meirzhan Kaltayev; Kazakhstan	Hsu Peng-yao; Chinese Taipei	Đinh Quốc Thông; Vietnam
−73 kg	Nguyễn Tuấn Học; Vietnam	Uktam Boboev; Uzbekistan	Mönkhbatyn Dagvadorj; Mongolia
−73 kg	Nguyễn Tuấn Học; Vietnam	Uktam Boboev; Uzbekistan	Praveen Thakur; India
−81 kg	Sharof Kholmamatov; Uzbekistan	Mukhit Tursynov; Kazakhstan	Chen Fu-chen; Chinese Taipei
−81 kg	Sharof Kholmamatov; Uzbekistan	Mukhit Tursynov; Kazakhstan	Kohei Yoshioka; Japan
−90 kg	Hossein Ghomi; Iran	Parviz Sobirov; Tajikistan	Masato Ishizaki; Japan
−90 kg	Hossein Ghomi; Iran	Parviz Sobirov; Tajikistan	Ekramuddin Ahmadi; Afghanistan

=== Women ===
Event	Gold	Silver	Bronze
−52 kg	Văn Ngọc Tú; Vietnam	Yu Ying-ying; Chinese Taipei	Petlada Nuinkaew; Thailand
−52 kg	Văn Ngọc Tú; Vietnam	Yu Ying-ying; Chinese Taipei	None awarded
−57 kg	Olessya Kutsenko; Kazakhstan	Orapa Senatham; Thailand	Ochirpüreviin Lkhagvakhüü; Mongolia
−57 kg	Olessya Kutsenko; Kazakhstan	Orapa Senatham; Thailand	Shally Manral; India
−63 kg	Nargiza Hamdamova; Uzbekistan	Toktam Bidel; Iran	Nguyễn Thị Lan; Vietnam
−63 kg	Nargiza Hamdamova; Uzbekistan	Toktam Bidel; Iran	Du Yu-ling; Chinese Taipei

== Medal table ==
Rank	Nation	Gold	Silver	Bronze	Total
1	Uzbekistan (UZB)	2	1	1	4
2	Iran (IRI)	2	1	0	3
2	Kazakhstan (KAZ)	2	1	0	3
4	Vietnam (VIE)	2	0	2	4
5	Chinese Taipei (TPE)	0	2	3	5
6	Afghanistan (AFG)	0	1	1	2
6	Thailand (THA)	0	1	1	2
8	Tajikistan (TJK)	0	1	0	1
9	India (IND)	0	0	2	2
9	Japan (JPN)	0	0	2	2
9	Mongolia (MGL)	0	0	2	2
12	Syria (SYR)	0	0	1	1
Totals (12 entries)		8	8	15	31

== Results ==
=== Men ===
==== 60 kg ====
2 November

Quarterfinals
Lalit Kumar (IND)
Abdul Wahed Wahedi (AFG)	W
Sarawut Petsing (THA)
Fadi Darwish (SYR)	W
Ganbaataryn Gonchigsumlaa (MGL)
Mostafa Dalirian (IRI)	W

Semifinals
Abdul Wahed Wahedi (AFG)	W
Fadi Darwish (SYR)
Mostafa Dalirian (IRI)	W
Ho Chih-yi (TPE)

Final
Abdul Wahed Wahedi (AFG)	000
Mostafa Dalirian (IRI)	100

==== 66 kg ====
3 November

Quarterfinals		Semifinals		Final
Tömörbaataryn Pürev-Ochir (MGL)	000
Elbek Ochilov (UZB)	100	Elbek Ochilov (UZB)	000
Ali Hadi (IRQ)	000	Meirzhan Kaltayev (KAZ)	002
Meirzhan Kaltayev (KAZ)	100			Meirzhan Kaltayev (KAZ)	110
Mansour Al-Shaleh (SYR)	000			Hsu Peng-yao (TPE)	001
Đinh Quốc Thông (VIE)	100	Đinh Quốc Thông (VIE)
Thitti Lekmechai (THA)	000	Hsu Peng-yao (TPE)	DSQ
Hsu Peng-yao (TPE)	123

==== 73 kg ====
3 November

Quarterfinals		Semifinals		Final
		Mönkhbatyn Dagvadorj (MGL)	001
Uktam Boboev (UZB)	121	Uktam Boboev (UZB)	101
Naoya Ogasawara (JPN)	000			Uktam Boboev (UZB)	001
Ihab Tawfeeq (IRQ)	000			Nguyễn Tuấn Học (VIE)	011
Nguyễn Tuấn Học (VIE)	101	Nguyễn Tuấn Học (VIE)	100
		Praveen Thakur (IND)	000

==== 81 kg ====
4 November

Quarterfinals
Chen Fu-chen (TPE)	DSQ
Tô Hải Long (VIE)
Sharof Kholmamatov (UZB)	101
Mohammad Jamali (IRI)	001

Semifinals
Chen Fu-chen (TPE)	002
Mukhit Tursynov (KAZ)	110
Kohei Yoshioka (JPN)	002
Sharof Kholmamatov (UZB)	103

Final
Mukhit Tursynov (KAZ)	000
Sharof Kholmamatov (UZB)	116

==== 90 kg ====
4 November

Round 1
Manish Kumar (IND)	120
Ali Abdul-Hussein (IRQ)	002

Quarterfinals
Ruslan Abdrazakov (KAZ)	001
Parviz Sobirov (TJK)	111
Mendbayaryn Tserenbat (MGL)
Masato Ishizaki (JPN)	DSQ
Kitsana Julapho (THA)	000
Ekramuddin Ahmadi (AFG)	100
Manish Kumar (IND)	000
Hossein Ghomi (IRI)	114

Semifinals
Parviz Sobirov (TJK)	101
Masato Ishizaki (JPN)	000
Ekramuddin Ahmadi (AFG)	000
Hossein Ghomi (IRI)	100

Final
Parviz Sobirov (TJK)	002
Hossein Ghomi (IRI)	010

=== Women ===
==== 52 kg ====
2 November

Pos	Athlete	Pld	W	L	VIE	TPE	THA	UZB
1	Văn Ngọc Tú (VIE)	3	3	0	—	W	W	W
2	Yu Ying-ying (TPE)	3	2	1	L	—	W	W
3	Petlada Nuinkaew (THA)	3	1	2	L	L	—	W
4	Gullola Norkulova (UZB)	3	0	3	L	L	L	—

Source: Official website

==== 57 kg ====
3 November

Quarterfinals		Semifinals		Final
		Orapa Senatham (THA)	100
Sanda Al-Daas (SYR)	001	Ochirpüreviin Lkhagvakhüü (MGL)	000
Ochirpüreviin Lkhagvakhüü (MGL)	021			Orapa Senatham (THA)	012
Akram Khani (IRI)	011			Olessya Kutsenko (KAZ)	014
Olessya Kutsenko (KAZ)	012	Olessya Kutsenko (KAZ)	101
		Shally Manral (IND)	000

==== 63 kg ====
4 November

Quarterfinals		Semifinals		Final
		Nguyễn Thị Lan (VIE)	001
Toktam Bidel (IRI)	111	Toktam Bidel (IRI)	010
Meenakshi Gahlot (IND)	010			Toktam Bidel (IRI)	001
Nargiza Hamdamova (UZB)	121			Nargiza Hamdamova (UZB)	003
Meruyert Kiakbayeva (KAZ)	000	Nargiza Hamdamova (UZB)	111
		Du Yu-ling (TPE)	001
