= Judo at the 2006 Asian Games – Men's 90 kg =

Judo competition

Men's 90 kg at the 2006 Asian Games
- Venue: Qatar SC Indoor Hall
- Date: 3 December 2006
- Competitors: 14 from 14 nations

Medalists
gold medal	Hwang Hee-tae	South Korea
silver medal	Maxim Rakov	Kazakhstan
bronze medal	Ramziddin Sayidov	Uzbekistan
bronze medal	Hiroshi Izumi	Japan

The men's 90 kilograms (middleweight) competition at the 2006 Asian Games in Doha was held on 3 December at the Qatar SC Indoor Hall.

== Schedule ==
All times are Arabia Standard Time (UTC+03:00)

Date	Time	Event
Sunday, 3 December 2006	14:00	Round of 16
Sunday, 3 December 2006	14:00	Quarterfinals
Sunday, 3 December 2006	14:00	Repechage −1R
Sunday, 3 December 2006	14:00	Repechage final
Sunday, 3 December 2006	14:00	Semifinals
Sunday, 3 December 2006	14:00	Finals

== Results ==
=== Main bracket ===
Round of 16
Reza Naeimi (QAT)	0000
Yousef Al-Enezi (KUW)	1021
Ramziddin Sayidov (UZB)	0010
Hwang Hee-tae (KOR)	1011
Sidney Schwarzkopf (PHI)	0000
Krisna Bayu (INA)	1000
He Yanzhu (CHN)	0200
Samer Amira (PLE)	0000
Hiroshi Izumi (JPN)	0001
Maxim Rakov (KAZ)	0010
Hossein Ghomi (IRI)	1010
Anil Kumar (IND)	0000

Quarterfinals
Yousef Al-Enezi (KUW)	0000
Hwang Hee-tae (KOR)	1000
Parviz Sobirov (TJK)	1000
Krisna Bayu (INA)	0000
He Yanzhu (CHN)	0000
Maxim Rakov (KAZ)	1010
Batbayaryn Ariun-Erdene (MGL)	0001
Hossein Ghomi (IRI)	1100

Semifinals
Hwang Hee-tae (KOR)	0120
Parviz Sobirov (TJK)	0000
Maxim Rakov (KAZ)	0010
Hossein Ghomi (IRI)	0001

Gold medal contest
Hwang Hee-tae (KOR)	0011
Maxim Rakov (KAZ)	0000

=== Repechage ===
Repechage −1R
Ramziddin Sayidov (UZB)	1000
Yousef Al-Enezi (KUW)	0000
Hiroshi Izumi (JPN)	1110
He Yanzhu (CHN)	0010
Anil Kumar (IND)	0000
Batbayaryn Ariun-Erdene (MGL)	1001

Repechage final
Ramziddin Sayidov (UZB)	0202
Krisna Bayu (INA)	0000
Hiroshi Izumi (JPN)	0011
Batbayaryn Ariun-Erdene (MGL)	0000

Bronze medal contest
Ramziddin Sayidov (UZB)	1000
Hossein Ghomi (IRI)	0000
Hiroshi Izumi (JPN)	1000
Parviz Sobirov (TJK)	0000
