= Belt wrestling at the 2009 Asian Indoor Games =

- Venue: Sóc Sơn Gymnasium
- Dates: 5–6 November 2009

Belt wrestling was contested as a demonstration sport at the 2009 Asian Indoor Games in Hanoi, Vietnam from 5 November to 6 November 2009. The competition took place at Sóc Sơn Gymnasium.

== Medalists ==
=== Men's freestyle ===
| Event | Gold | Silver | Bronze |
|---|---|---|---|
| 66 kg | Jahongir Abdulaev; Uzbekistan | Arsenii Fufachev; Kyrgyzstan | Medet Zhumassiyanov; Kazakhstan |
| 66 kg | Jahongir Abdulaev; Uzbekistan | Arsenii Fufachev; Kyrgyzstan | Phan Đức Thắng; Vietnam |
| 73 kg | Rustamjon Umarov; Uzbekistan | Hirozumi Tanaka; Japan | Tömörbaataryn Pürev-Ochir; Mongolia |
| 73 kg | Rustamjon Umarov; Uzbekistan | Hirozumi Tanaka; Japan | Ngô Chí Thanh; Vietnam |
| 81 kg | Rustambek Artikov; Uzbekistan | Temirlan Salavat Uulu; Kyrgyzstan | Mohammad Mansouri Davar; Iran |
| 81 kg | Rustambek Artikov; Uzbekistan | Temirlan Salavat Uulu; Kyrgyzstan | Mönkhbatyn Dagvadorj; Mongolia |
| 90 kg | Reza Abdoli; Iran | Ekramuddin Ahmadi; Afghanistan | Đoàn Xuân Luyện; Vietnam |
| 90 kg | Reza Abdoli; Iran | Ekramuddin Ahmadi; Afghanistan | Nematulla Tuychiev; Uzbekistan |
| 100 kg | Mehdi Ebrahimi; Iran | Phạm Văn Hiệp; Vietnam | Ali Abdul-Hussein; Iraq |
| 100 kg | Mehdi Ebrahimi; Iran | Phạm Văn Hiệp; Vietnam | Begzyn Jargalsaikhan; Mongolia |
| +100 kg | Shuhratjon Bozorov; Uzbekistan | Hadi Rafiei; Iran | Hussein Hasan; Iraq |
| +100 kg | Shuhratjon Bozorov; Uzbekistan | Hadi Rafiei; Iran | None awarded |

=== Men's classic style ===
| Event | Gold | Silver | Bronze |
|---|---|---|---|
| 66 kg | Phan Đức Thắng; Vietnam | Medet Zhumassiyanov; Kazakhstan | Jahongir Abdulaev; Uzbekistan |
| 66 kg | Phan Đức Thắng; Vietnam | Medet Zhumassiyanov; Kazakhstan | Ali Hadi; Iraq |
| 73 kg | Arsenii Fufachev; Kyrgyzstan | Hirozumi Tanaka; Japan | Ngô Chí Thanh; Vietnam |
| 73 kg | Arsenii Fufachev; Kyrgyzstan | Hirozumi Tanaka; Japan | Mohammad Rahattalab; Iran |
| 81 kg | Temirlan Salavat Uulu; Kyrgyzstan | Rustamjon Umarov; Uzbekistan | Mohammad Mansouri Davar; Iran |
| 81 kg | Temirlan Salavat Uulu; Kyrgyzstan | Rustamjon Umarov; Uzbekistan | Đỗ Trung Kiên; Vietnam |
| 90 kg | Rustambek Artikov; Uzbekistan | Reza Abdoli; Iran | Qutaiba Hussein; Iraq |
| 90 kg | Rustambek Artikov; Uzbekistan | Reza Abdoli; Iran | Ekramuddin Ahmadi; Afghanistan |
| 100 kg | Phạm Văn Hiệp; Vietnam | Ali Abdul-Hussein; Iraq | Mohammad Asgari; Iran |
| 100 kg | Phạm Văn Hiệp; Vietnam | Ali Abdul-Hussein; Iraq | Nematulla Tuychiev; Uzbekistan |
| +100 kg | Shuhratjon Bozorov; Uzbekistan | Hadi Rafiei; Iran | None awarded |
| +100 kg | Shuhratjon Bozorov; Uzbekistan | Hadi Rafiei; Iran | None awarded |

=== Women's freestyle ===
| Event | Gold | Silver | Bronze |
|---|---|---|---|
| 58 kg | Ochirpüreviin Lkhagvakhüü; Mongolia | Ugiloy Latipova; Uzbekistan | Phạm Thị Loan; Vietnam |
| 58 kg | Ochirpüreviin Lkhagvakhüü; Mongolia | Ugiloy Latipova; Uzbekistan | None awarded |
| 66 kg | Bùi Thị Khánh Du; Vietnam | Kim Eon-kyung; South Korea | None awarded |
| 66 kg | Bùi Thị Khánh Du; Vietnam | Kim Eon-kyung; South Korea | None awarded |

== Medal table ==
| Rank | Nation | Gold | Silver | Bronze | Total |
|---|---|---|---|---|---|
| 1 | Uzbekistan (UZB) | 6 | 2 | 3 | 11 |
| 2 | Vietnam (VIE) | 3 | 1 | 6 | 10 |
| 3 | Iran (IRI) | 2 | 3 | 4 | 9 |
| 4 | Kyrgyzstan (KGZ) | 2 | 2 | 0 | 4 |
| 5 | Mongolia (MGL) | 1 | 0 | 3 | 4 |
| 6 | Japan (JPN) | 0 | 2 | 0 | 2 |
| 7 | Iraq (IRQ) | 0 | 1 | 4 | 5 |
| 8 | Afghanistan (AFG) | 0 | 1 | 1 | 2 |
| 8 | Kazakhstan (KAZ) | 0 | 1 | 1 | 2 |
| 10 | South Korea (KOR) | 0 | 1 | 0 | 1 |
| Totals (10 entries) | | 14 | 14 | 22 | 50 |

== Results ==
=== Men's freestyle ===
==== 66 kg ====
5 November

| Quarterfinals | | Semifinals | | Final |
| | | Arsenii Fufachev (KGZ) | Fall |
| Ali Hadi (IRQ) | 0 | Medet Zhumassiyanov (KAZ) |
| Medet Zhumassiyanov (KAZ) | 1 | | | Arsenii Fufachev (KGZ) | 0 |
| Phan Đức Thắng (VIE) | Fall | | | Jahongir Abdulaev (UZB) | 6 |
| Ganbaataryn Gonchigsumlaa (MGL) | | Phan Đức Thắng (VIE) |
| | | Jahongir Abdulaev (UZB) | Fall |

==== 73 kg ====
5 November

| Pos | Athlete | Pld | W | L | UZB | JPN | MGL | VIE | IRI |
|---|---|---|---|---|---|---|---|---|---|
| 1 | Rustamjon Umarov (UZB) | 4 | 4 | 0 | — | 6–0 | 2–0 | Fall | WO |
| 2 | Hirozumi Tanaka (JPN) | 4 | 2 | 2 | 0–6 | — | 6–0 | 1–2 | WO |
| 3 | Tömörbaataryn Pürev-Ochir (MGL) | 4 | 2 | 2 | 0–2 | 0–6 | — | Fall | WO |
| 4 | Ngô Chí Thanh (VIE) | 4 | 2 | 2 | | 2–1 | | — | WO |
| 5 | Mohammad Rahattalab (IRI) | 4 | 0 | 4 | | | | | — |

Source: Official website

==== 81 kg ====
5 November

| Pos | Athlete | Pld | W | L | UZB | KGZ | IRI | MGL | VIE |
|---|---|---|---|---|---|---|---|---|---|
| 1 | Rustambek Artikov (UZB) | 4 | 4 | 0 | — | 2–0 | Fall | 4–3 | Fall |
| 2 | Temirlan Salavat Uulu (KGZ) | 4 | 3 | 1 | 0–2 | — | Fall | 6–0 | 7–0 |
| 3 | Mohammad Mansouri Davar (IRI) | 4 | 2 | 2 | | | — | Fall | 6–0 |
| 4 | Mönkhbatyn Dagvadorj (MGL) | 4 | 1 | 3 | 3–4 | 0–6 | | — | 2–1 |
| 5 | Đỗ Trung Kiên (VIE) | 4 | 0 | 4 | | 0–7 | 0–6 | 1–2 | — |

Source: Official website

==== 90 kg ====
5 November

| Pos | Athlete | Pld | W | L | IRI | AFG | UZB | VIE | IRQ |
|---|---|---|---|---|---|---|---|---|---|
| 1 | Reza Abdoli (IRI) | 4 | 3 | 1 | — | Fall | | Fall | Fall |
| 2 | Ekramuddin Ahmadi (AFG) | 4 | 3 | 1 | | — | Fall | Fall | Fall |
| 3 | Nematulla Tuychiev (UZB) | 4 | 2 | 2 | Fall | | — | 0–5 | Fall |
| 4 | Đoàn Xuân Luyện (VIE) | 4 | 2 | 2 | | | 5–0 | — | 3–1 |
| 5 | Qutaiba Hussein (IRQ) | 4 | 0 | 4 | | | | 1–3 | — |

Source: Official website

==== 100 kg ====
5 November

| Pos | Athlete | Pld | W | L | IRI | VIE | IRQ | MGL |
|---|---|---|---|---|---|---|---|---|
| 1 | Mehdi Ebrahimi (IRI) | 3 | 3 | 0 | — | Fall | Fall | WO |
| 2 | Phạm Văn Hiệp (VIE) | 3 | 2 | 1 | | — | 6–0 | Fall |
| 3 | Ali Abdul-Hussein (IRQ) | 3 | 1 | 2 | | 0–6 | — | WO |
| 4 | Begzyn Jargalsaikhan (MGL) | 3 | 0 | 3 | | | | — |

Source: Official website

==== +100 kg ====
5 November

| Pos | Athlete | Pld | W | L | UZB | IRI | IRQ |
|---|---|---|---|---|---|---|---|
| 1 | Shuhratjon Bozorov (UZB) | 2 | 2 | 0 | — | Fall | Fall |
| 2 | Hadi Rafiei (IRI) | 2 | 1 | 1 | | — | Fall |
| 3 | Hussein Hasan (IRQ) | 2 | 0 | 2 | | | — |

Source: Official website

=== Men's classic style ===
==== 66 kg ====
6 November

| Pos | Athlete | Pld | W | L | VIE | KAZ | UZB | IRQ |
|---|---|---|---|---|---|---|---|---|
| 1 | Phan Đức Thắng (VIE) | 3 | 3 | 0 | — | 1–0 | Fall | Fall |
| 2 | Medet Zhumassiyanov (KAZ) | 3 | 2 | 1 | 0–1 | — | Fall | Fall |
| 3 | Jahongir Abdulaev (UZB) | 3 | 1 | 2 | | | — | Fall |
| 4 | Ali Hadi (IRQ) | 3 | 0 | 3 | | | | — |

Source: Official website

==== 73 kg ====
6 November

| Pos | Athlete | Pld | W | L | KGZ | JPN | VIE | IRI |
|---|---|---|---|---|---|---|---|---|
| 1 | Arsenii Fufachev (KGZ) | 3 | 3 | 0 | — | Fall | 6–0 | WO |
| 2 | Hirozumi Tanaka (JPN) | 3 | 2 | 1 | | — | 8–2 | WO |
| 3 | Ngô Chí Thanh (VIE) | 3 | 1 | 2 | 0–6 | 2–8 | — | WO |
| 4 | Mohammad Rahattalab (IRI) | 3 | 0 | 3 | | | | — |

Source: Official website

==== 81 kg ====
6 November

| Pos | Athlete | Pld | W | L | KGZ | UZB | IRI | VIE |
|---|---|---|---|---|---|---|---|---|
| 1 | Temirlan Salavat Uulu (KGZ) | 3 | 3 | 0 | — | 4–4 | Fall | Fall |
| 2 | Rustamjon Umarov (UZB) | 3 | 2 | 1 | 4–4 | — | Fall | Fall |
| 3 | Mohammad Mansouri Davar (IRI) | 3 | 1 | 2 | | | — | Fall |
| 4 | Đỗ Trung Kiên (VIE) | 3 | 0 | 3 | | | | — |

Source: Official website

==== 90 kg ====
6 November

| Pos | Athlete | Pld | W | L | UZB | IRI | IRQ | AFG | VIE |
|---|---|---|---|---|---|---|---|---|---|
| 1 | Rustambek Artikov (UZB) | 4 | 4 | 0 | — | 5–4 | 5–1 | Fall | Fall |
| 2 | Reza Abdoli (IRI) | 4 | 3 | 1 | 4–5 | — | 5–0 | Fall | Fall |
| 3 | Qutaiba Hussein (IRQ) | 4 | 2 | 2 | 1–5 | 0–5 | — | Fall | Fall |
| 4 | Ekramuddin Ahmadi (AFG) | 4 | 1 | 3 | | | | — | Fall |
| 5 | Đoàn Xuân Luyện (VIE) | 4 | 0 | 4 | | | | | — |

Source: Official website

==== 100 kg ====
6 November

| Pos | Athlete | Pld | W | L | VIE | IRQ | IRI | UZB |
|---|---|---|---|---|---|---|---|---|
| 1 | Phạm Văn Hiệp (VIE) | 3 | 3 | 0 | — | Fall | 2–0 | Fall |
| 2 | Ali Abdul-Hussein (IRQ) | 3 | 2 | 1 | | — | Fall | 6–0 |
| 3 | Mohammad Asgari (IRI) | 3 | 1 | 2 | 0–2 | | — | Fall |
| 4 | Nematulla Tuychiev (UZB) | 3 | 0 | 3 | | 0–6 | | — |

Source: Official website

==== +100 kg ====
6 November

| Pos | Athlete | Pld | W | L | UZB | IRI | IRQ |
|---|---|---|---|---|---|---|---|
| 1 | Shuhratjon Bozorov (UZB) | 2 | 2 | 0 | — | 4–2 | WO |
| 2 | Hadi Rafiei (IRI) | 2 | 1 | 1 | 2–4 | — | WO |
| — | Hussein Hasan (IRQ) | 2 | 0 | 2 | | | — |

Source: Official website

=== Women's freestyle ===
==== 58 kg ====
5 November

| Pos | Athlete | Pld | W | L | MGL | UZB | VIE |
|---|---|---|---|---|---|---|---|
| 1 | Ochirpüreviin Lkhagvakhüü (MGL) | 2 | 2 | 0 | — | Fall | Fall |
| 2 | Ugiloy Latipova (UZB) | 2 | 1 | 1 | | — | Fall |
| 3 | Phạm Thị Loan (VIE) | 2 | 0 | 2 | | | — |

Source: Official website

==== 66 kg ====
5 November

| Final |
| Bùi Thị Khánh Du (VIE) | Fall |
| Kim Eon-kyung (KOR) |
