= Ju-jitsu at the 2009 Asian Indoor Games =

- Venue: Sóc Sơn Gymnasium
- Dates: 3–4 November 2009

Ju-Jitsu was contested as a demonstration sport at the 2009 Asian Indoor Games in Hanoi, Vietnam from 3 November to 4 November 2009. The competition took place at the Sóc Sơn Gymnasium.

== Medalists ==
=== Duo ===
Event	Gold	Silver	Bronze
Men	Iran; Mohammad Rahattalab; Amir Houshang Hamsayeh	Vietnam	Iraq; Qutaiba Hussein; Murtadha Kamal
Men	Iran; Mohammad Rahattalab; Amir Houshang Hamsayeh	Vietnam	None awarded

=== Men's fighting ===
Event	Gold	Silver	Bronze
−62 kg	Ali Hadi; Iraq	Nguyễn Văn Bút; Vietnam	Mohd Subhi Ismail; Singapore
−62 kg	Ali Hadi; Iraq	Nguyễn Văn Bút; Vietnam	None awarded
−69 kg	Mohammad Rahattalab; Iran	Mubarak Mochsin Abdat; Singapore	Ihab Tawfeeq; Iraq
−69 kg	Mohammad Rahattalab; Iran	Mubarak Mochsin Abdat; Singapore	Phan Trung Hiếu; Vietnam
−77 kg	Mohammad Mansouri Davar; Iran	Trận Thường; Vietnam	Siaf Khedher; Iraq
−77 kg	Mohammad Mansouri Davar; Iran	Trận Thường; Vietnam	None awarded
−85 kg	Reza Abdoli; Iran	Murtadha Kamal; Iraq	None awarded
−85 kg	Reza Abdoli; Iran	Murtadha Kamal; Iraq	None awarded
−94 kg	Mehdi Ebrahimi; Iran	Qutaiba Hussein; Iraq	None awarded
−94 kg	Mehdi Ebrahimi; Iran	Qutaiba Hussein; Iraq	None awarded
+94 kg	Hadi Rafiei; Iran	Ngô Văn Tu; Vietnam	Hussein Hasan; Iraq
+94 kg	Hadi Rafiei; Iran	Ngô Văn Tu; Vietnam	None awarded

=== Women's fighting ===
Event	Gold	Silver	Bronze
−55 kg	Dương Thị Thanh Minh; Vietnam	Celestine Seet; Singapore	None awarded
−55 kg	Dương Thị Thanh Minh; Vietnam	Celestine Seet; Singapore	None awarded
−62 kg	Phạm Thị Văn Anh; Vietnam	Kim Eon-kyung; South Korea	None awarded
−62 kg	Phạm Thị Văn Anh; Vietnam	Kim Eon-kyung; South Korea	None awarded
+70 kg	Trần Thị Phương Trang; Vietnam	Akram Khani; Iran	None awarded
+70 kg	Trần Thị Phương Trang; Vietnam	Akram Khani; Iran	None awarded

== Medal table ==
Rank	Nation	Gold	Silver	Bronze	Total
1	Iran (IRI)	6	1	0	7
2	Vietnam (VIE)	3	4	1	8
3	Iraq (IRQ)	1	2	4	7
4	Singapore (SIN)	0	2	1	3
5	South Korea (KOR)	0	1	0	1
Totals (5 entries)		10	10	6	26

== Results ==
=== Duo ===
==== Men ====
4 November

Pos	Team	Pld	W	L	IRI	VIE	IRQ
1	Iran	2	2	0	—	81–72	72–62
2	Vietnam	2	1	1	72–81	—	81–72
3	Iraq	2	0	2	62–72	72–81	—

Source: Official website

=== Men's fighting ===
==== 62 kg ====
4 November

Pos	Athlete	Pld	W	L	IRQ	VIE	SIN
1	Ali Hadi (IRQ)	2	2	0	—	6–4	5–4
2	Nguyễn Văn Bút (VIE)	2	1	1	4–6	—	6–4
3	Mohd Subhi Ismail (SIN)	2	0	2	4–5	4–6	—

Source: Official website

==== 69 kg ====
4 November

Semifinals
Phan Trung Hiếu (VIE)	0
Mohammad Rahattalab (IRI)	8
Ihab Tawfeeq (IRQ)	6
Mubarak Mochsin Abdat (SIN)	7

Final
Mohammad Rahattalab (IRI)	10
Mubarak Mochsin Abdat (SIN)	3
Bronze
Phan Trung Hiếu (VIE)	10
Ihab Tawfeeq (IRQ)	13

==== 77 kg ====
4 November

Semifinals		Final
		Mohammad Mansouri Davar (IRI)	14
Siaf Khedher (IRQ)	0	Trận Thường (VIE)	0
Trận Thường (VIE)	14

==== 85 kg ====
3 November

Final
Murtadha Kamal (IRQ)	2
Reza Abdoli (IRI)	3

==== 94 kg ====
3 November

Final
Mehdi Ebrahimi (IRI)	13
Qutaiba Hussein (IRQ)	3

==== +94 kg ====
3 November

Pos	Athlete	Pld	W	L	IRI	VIE	IRQ
1	Hadi Rafiei (IRI)	2	2	0	—	7–3	3–2
2	Ngô Văn Tu (VIE)	2	1	1	3–7	—	13–7
3	Hussein Hasan (IRQ)	2	0	2	2–3	7–13	—

Source: Official website

=== Women's fighting ===
==== 55 kg ====
3 November

Final
Dương Thị Thanh Minh (VIE)	10
Celestine Seet (SIN)	2

==== 62 kg ====
3 November

Final
Phạm Thị Văn Anh (VIE)	4
Kim Eon-kyung (KOR)	2

==== +70 kg ====
4 November

Final
Akram Khani (IRI)	3
Trần Thị Phương Trang (VIE)	4
