= Wushu at the 2009 Asian Indoor Games =

- Venue: Trịnh Hoài Đức Gymnasium
- Dates: 4–7 November 2009

Women's wushu was contested at the 2009 Asian Indoor Games in Hanoi, Vietnam from November 4 to November 7. The competition took place at Trịnh Hoài Đức Gymnasium.

== Medalists ==
=== Duilian ===
| Event | Gold | Silver | Bronze |
|---|---|---|---|
| Barehand | Vietnam; Hoàng Thị Phương Giang; Dương Thúy Vi | Sri Lanka; Bhagya Maduwanthie; Nishadi Lakshika Perera; Damayanthi Samarawickrama | Thailand; Sirivimol Pinchan; Suvanant Choowong |
| Weapons | China; Feng Kaijie; Zhang Xinyi; Liu Xiaohui | Hong Kong; Kwan Ning Wai; Yuen Ka Ying; Zheng Tianhui | Brunei; Faustina Woo; Lee Ying Shi |
| Weapons | China; Feng Kaijie; Zhang Xinyi; Liu Xiaohui | Hong Kong; Kwan Ning Wai; Yuen Ka Ying; Zheng Tianhui | Indonesia; Vania Rosalin Irmanto; Felicia Alverina Monindra; Cindy Sutanto |

=== Sanshou ===
| Event | Gold | Silver | Bronze |
|---|---|---|---|
| 48 kg | Nguyễn Thị Bích; Vietnam | Khadijeh Zeinalzadeh; Iran | Jennifer Lagilag; Philippines |
| 48 kg | Nguyễn Thị Bích; Vietnam | Khadijeh Zeinalzadeh; Iran | Chao Ho Yee; Hong Kong |
| 52 kg | Gong Jinlan; China | Rhea May Rifani; Philippines | Nguyễn Thùy Ngân; Vietnam |
| 52 kg | Gong Jinlan; China | Rhea May Rifani; Philippines | None awarded |
| 56 kg | Shi Wenqi; China | Maryam Tavakkoli; Iran | Phannipha Lukchanthuek; Thailand |
| 56 kg | Shi Wenqi; China | Maryam Tavakkoli; Iran | Wangkhem Sandhyarani Devi; India |
| 60 kg | Zahra Karimi; Iran | Wang Wei; China | Nazeen Ahmed; Iraq |
| 60 kg | Zahra Karimi; Iran | Wang Wei; China | None awarded |
| 65 kg | Song Ling; China | Nguyễn Thị Sang; Vietnam | Pimnipa Tanawatpipat; Thailand |
| 65 kg | Song Ling; China | Nguyễn Thị Sang; Vietnam | K. Rebita Devi; India |
| 70 kg | Nguyễn Thị Hải Yến; Vietnam | Fatemeh Dehghani; Iran | Jaiwanti; India |
| 70 kg | Nguyễn Thị Hải Yến; Vietnam | Fatemeh Dehghani; Iran | None awarded |

== Medal table ==
| Rank | Nation | Gold | Silver | Bronze | Total |
|---|---|---|---|---|---|
| 1 | China (CHN) | 4 | 1 | 0 | 5 |
| 2 | Vietnam (VIE) | 3 | 1 | 1 | 5 |
| 3 | Iran (IRI) | 1 | 3 | 0 | 4 |
| 4 | Hong Kong (HKG) | 0 | 1 | 1 | 2 |
| 4 | Philippines (PHI) | 0 | 1 | 1 | 2 |
| 6 | Sri Lanka (SRI) | 0 | 1 | 0 | 1 |
| 7 | India (IND) | 0 | 0 | 3 | 3 |
| 7 | Thailand (THA) | 0 | 0 | 3 | 3 |
| 9 | Brunei (BRU) | 0 | 0 | 1 | 1 |
| 9 | Indonesia (INA) | 0 | 0 | 1 | 1 |
| 9 | Iraq (IRQ) | 0 | 0 | 1 | 1 |
| Totals (11 entries) | | 8 | 8 | 12 | 28 |

== Results ==
=== Duilian ===
==== Barehand ====
7 November

| Rank | Team | Score |
|---|---|---|
| 1st place, gold medalist(s) | Vietnam (VIE) | 9.60 |
| 2nd place, silver medalist(s) | Sri Lanka (SRI) | 9.12 |
| 3rd place, bronze medalist(s) | Thailand (THA) | 9.05 |

==== Weapons ====
7 November

| Rank | Team | Score |
|---|---|---|
| 1st place, gold medalist(s) | China (CHN) | 9.82 |
| 2nd place, silver medalist(s) | Hong Kong (HKG) | 9.57 |
| 3rd place, bronze medalist(s) | Brunei (BRU) | 9.40 |
| 3rd place, bronze medalist(s) | Indonesia (INA) | 9.40 |
| 5 | India (IND) | 9.29 |
| 6 | Iran (IRI) | 9.09 |

=== Sanshou ===
==== 48 kg ====
| Quarterfinals; 4 November | | Semifinals; 5 November | | Final; 5 November |
| | | Jennifer Lagilag (PHI) | 0 |
| P. Sakuntala Devi (IND) | 0 | Nguyễn Thị Bích (VIE) | 2 |
| Nguyễn Thị Bích (VIE) | 2 | | | Nguyễn Thị Bích (VIE) | 2 |
| | | | | Khadijeh Zeinalzadeh (IRI) | 0 |
| | | Khadijeh Zeinalzadeh (IRI) | 2 |
| | | Chao Ho Yee (HKG) | 0 |

==== 52 kg ====
4–6 November

| Pos | Athlete | Pld | W | L | Pts | CHN | PHI | VIE |
|---|---|---|---|---|---|---|---|---|
| 1 | Gong Jinlan (CHN) | 2 | 2 | 0 | 4 | — | 2–0 | 2–0 |
| 2 | Rhea May Rifani (PHI) | 2 | 1 | 1 | 2 | 0–2 | — | 2–1 |
| 3 | Nguyễn Thùy Ngân (VIE) | 2 | 0 | 2 | 0 | 0–2 | 1–2 | — |

Source: Official website

==== 56 kg ====
| Semifinals; 4 November | | Final; 6 November |
| Shi Wenqi (CHN) | 2 |
| Phannipha Lukchanthuek (THA) | 0 | Shi Wenqi (CHN) | 2 |
| Wangkhem Sandhyarani Devi (IND) | 0 | Maryam Tavakkoli (IRI) | 0 |
| Maryam Tavakkoli (IRI) | 2 |

==== 60 kg ====
4–6 November

| Pos | Athlete | Pld | W | L | Pts | IRI | CHN | IRQ |
|---|---|---|---|---|---|---|---|---|
| 1 | Zahra Karimi (IRI) | 2 | 2 | 0 | 4 | — | 2–0 | WO |
| 2 | Wang Wei (CHN) | 2 | 1 | 1 | 2 | 0–2 | — | WO |
| 3 | Nazeen Ahmed (IRQ) | 2 | 0 | 2 | 0 | | | — |

Source: Official website

==== 65 kg ====
| Semifinals; 5 November | | Final; 6 November |
| Nguyễn Thị Sang (VIE) | 2 |
| Pimnipa Tanawatpipat (THA) | 0 | Nguyễn Thị Sang (VIE) | 0 |
| Song Ling (CHN) | 2 | Song Ling (CHN) | 2 |
| K. Rebita Devi (IND) | 0 |

==== 70 kg ====
4–6 November

| Pos | Athlete | Pld | W | L | Pts | VIE | IRI | IND |
|---|---|---|---|---|---|---|---|---|
| 1 | Nguyễn Thị Hải Yến (VIE) | 2 | 2 | 0 | 4 | — | 2–0 | 2–0 |
| 2 | Fatemeh Dehghani (IRI) | 2 | 1 | 1 | 2 | 0–2 | — | 2–0 |
| 3 | Jaiwanti (IND) | 2 | 0 | 2 | 0 | 0–2 | 0–2 | — |

Source: Official website
