= Kickboxing at the 2009 Asian Indoor Games =

- Venue: Vân Đồn Gymnasium
- Dates: 3–7 November 2009

Kickboxing was contested at the 2009 Asian Indoor Games in Ho Chi Minh City, Vietnam from 3 to 7 November. The competition took place at Vân Đồn Gymnasium.

== Medalists ==
=== Point fighting ===
Event	Gold	Silver	Bronze
Men's −63 kg	Direk Thongnoon; Thailand	Ahmed Karim; Iraq	Mohammad Al-Mathkori; Kuwait
Men's −63 kg	Direk Thongnoon; Thailand	Ahmed Karim; Iraq	Pankaj Mahanta; India
Men's −74 kg	Mahmoud Al-Khatib; Jordan	Nguyễn Văn Sử; Vietnam	Stelyan Avramidi; Kazakhstan
Men's −74 kg	Mahmoud Al-Khatib; Jordan	Nguyễn Văn Sử; Vietnam	Boldbaataryn Naadam; Mongolia
Women's −50 kg	Đào Thị Thoan; Vietnam	Ratnadiptee Shimpi; India	Saniya Suleimenova; Kazakhstan
Women's −50 kg	Đào Thị Thoan; Vietnam	Ratnadiptee Shimpi; India	Kanoksri Pongthian; Thailand

=== Low kick ===
Event	Gold	Silver	Bronze
Men's −51 kg	Mehdi Jalilnavaz; Iran	Nguyễn Phi Long; Vietnam	Basim Matar; Iraq
Men's −51 kg	Mehdi Jalilnavaz; Iran	Nguyễn Phi Long; Vietnam	Manoj Kumar; India
Men's −54 kg	Alemzhan Kudaibergenov; Kazakhstan	Moawiah Abuhammad; Jordan	Mohammad Amir Khan; India
Men's −54 kg	Alemzhan Kudaibergenov; Kazakhstan	Moawiah Abuhammad; Jordan	Napa Sopagul; Thailand
Men's −67 kg	Sayan Zhakupov; Kazakhstan	Mohammad Nezami; Iran	Salam Lemba Meitei; India
Men's −67 kg	Sayan Zhakupov; Kazakhstan	Mohammad Nezami; Iran	Wongsawat Chantharangsu; Thailand
Men's −75 kg	Jamshid Asghar-Givehchi; Iran	Jad Al-Wahash; Jordan	Bobirzhan Artykbayev; Kazakhstan
Men's −75 kg	Jamshid Asghar-Givehchi; Iran	Jad Al-Wahash; Jordan	Gansürengiin Javkhlan; Mongolia
Women's −52 kg	Nguyễn Thị Tuyết Mai; Vietnam	Farinaz Lari; Iran	Shagiya Zhamalova; Kazakhstan
Women's −52 kg	Nguyễn Thị Tuyết Mai; Vietnam	Farinaz Lari; Iran	Vatinee Saranburus; Thailand

== Medal table ==
Rank	Nation	Gold	Silver	Bronze	Total
1	Iran (IRI)	2	2	0	4
1	Vietnam (VIE)	2	2	0	4
3	Kazakhstan (KAZ)	2	0	4	6
4	Jordan (JOR)	1	2	0	3
5	Thailand (THA)	1	0	4	5
6	India (IND)	0	1	4	5
7	Iraq (IRQ)	0	1	1	2
8	Mongolia (MGL)	0	0	2	2
9	Kuwait (KUW)	0	0	1	1
Totals (9 entries)		8	8	16	32

== Results ==
=== Point fighting ===
==== Men's 63 kg ====
Quarterfinals; 3 November
Mehran Feizollahi (IRI)	3
Mohammad Al-Mathkori (KUW)	11

Semifinals; 5 November
Mohammad Al-Mathkori (KUW)
Direk Thongnoon (THA)	RSC
Ahmed Karim (IRQ)	10
Pankaj Mahanta (IND)	3

Final; 7 November
Direk Thongnoon (THA)	10
Ahmed Karim (IRQ)	8

==== Men's 74 kg ====
Semifinals; 5 November		Final; 7 November
Stelyan Avramidi (KAZ)
Mahmoud Al-Khatib (JOR)	RSCO	Mahmoud Al-Khatib (JOR)	8
Nguyễn Văn Sử (VIE)	15	Nguyễn Văn Sử (VIE)	7
Boldbaataryn Naadam (MGL)	5

==== Women's 50 kg ====
Quarterfinals; 4 November
Tahereh Eslamian (IRI)	4
Đào Thị Thoan (VIE)	11

Semifinals; 5 November
Đào Thị Thoan (VIE)	11
Saniya Suleimenova (KAZ)	5
Ratnadiptee Shimpi (IND)	RSC
Kanoksri Pongthian (THA)

Final; 7 November
Đào Thị Thoan (VIE)	12
Ratnadiptee Shimpi (IND)	9

=== Low kick ===
==== Men's 51 kg ====
Quarterfinals; 3 November
Nguyễn Phi Long (VIE)	2
Borkhüügiin Myagmarsüren (MGL)	1

Semifinals; 5 November
Nguyễn Phi Long (VIE)	2
Basim Matar (IRQ)	1
Mehdi Jalilnavaz (IRI)	3
Manoj Kumar (IND)	0

Final; 7 November
Nguyễn Phi Long (VIE)	1
Mehdi Jalilnavaz (IRI)	2

==== Men's 54 kg ====
Quarterfinals; 4 November		Semifinals; 5 November		Final; 7 November
Nurali Bakirdinov (UZB)	0
Moawiah Abuhammad (JOR)	3	Moawiah Abuhammad (JOR)	2
Mohammad Amir Khan (IND)	2	Mohammad Amir Khan (IND)	1
Fouad Mohammed (IRQ)	1			Moawiah Abuhammad (JOR)	0
Alemzhan Kudaibergenov (KAZ)	RSC			Alemzhan Kudaibergenov (KAZ)	3
Hà Trọng Hoàng Phi (VIE)		Alemzhan Kudaibergenov (KAZ)	2
Napa Sopagul (THA)	2	Napa Sopagul (THA)	1
Abdulrahman Al-Shammari (KUW)	1

==== Men's 67 kg ====
Round 1; 3 November
Odilbek Allaberganov (UZB)
Sayan Zhakupov (KAZ)	KO

Quarterfinals; 4 November
Kadhim Hammoud (IRQ)	1
Mohammad Nezami (IRI)	2
Salam Lemba Meitei (IND)	3
Meshal Al-Arbeed (KUW)	0
Ölziibatyn Törbayar (MGL)
Wongsawat Chantharangsu (THA)	KO
Sayan Zhakupov (KAZ)	3
Ali Ahmad Khalaf (JOR)	0

Semifinals; 5 November
Mohammad Nezami (IRI)	3
Salam Lemba Meitei (IND)	0
Wongsawat Chantharangsu (THA)	0
Sayan Zhakupov (KAZ)	3

Final; 7 November
Mohammad Nezami (IRI)
Sayan Zhakupov (KAZ)	KO

==== Men's 75 kg ====
Quarterfinals; 4 November
Trần Thanh Tâm (VIE)
Bobirzhan Artykbayev (KAZ)	KO
Jamshid Asghar-Givehchi (IRI)	RSC
Prajaksin Kaenjanbai (THA)
Mohammad Al-Qallaf (KUW)	1
Gansürengiin Javkhlan (MGL)	2

Semifinals; 5 November
Bobirzhan Artykbayev (KAZ)	1
Jamshid Asghar-Givehchi (IRI)	2
Jad Al-Wahash (JOR)	3
Gansürengiin Javkhlan (MGL)	0

Final; 7 November
Jamshid Asghar-Givehchi (IRI)	3
Jad Al-Wahash (JOR)	0

==== Women's 52 kg ====
Quarterfinals; 3 November
Ritika Singh (IND)	0
Shagiya Zhamalova (KAZ)	3

Semifinals; 5 November
Shagiya Zhamalova (KAZ)	0
Farinaz Lari (IRI)	3
Nguyễn Thị Tuyết Mai (VIE)	3
Vatinee Saranburus (THA)	0

Final; 7 November
Farinaz Lari (IRI)	0
Nguyễn Thị Tuyết Mai (VIE)	3
