= Boxing at the 2009 Asian Indoor Games =

- Venue: Bắc Ninh Gymnasium
- Dates: 30 October – 4 November 2009

Women's boxing was contested at the 2009 Asian Indoor Games in Hanoi, Vietnam from 30 October to 4 November. The competition took place at the Bắc Ninh Gymnasium.

== Medalists ==
Event	Gold	Silver	Bronze
Pinweight; 46 kg	Mary Kom; India	Nguyễn Thị Hoa; Vietnam	Josie Gabuco; Philippines
Pinweight; 46 kg	Mary Kom; India	Nguyễn Thị Hoa; Vietnam	Anusha Koddithuwakku; Sri Lanka
Light flyweight 48 kg	Ngô Thị Phương; Vietnam	Lin Jinmei; China	Lin Wan-ting; Chinese Taipei
Light flyweight 48 kg	Ngô Thị Phương; Vietnam	Lin Jinmei; China	Dueannapha Ngamlam; Thailand
Flyweight; 51 kg	Annie Albania; Philippines	Sopida Satumrum; Thailand	Wong Sio Chao; Macau
Flyweight; 51 kg	Annie Albania; Philippines	Sopida Satumrum; Thailand	Chhoto Loura; India
Light bantamweight 54 kg	Zhang Qin; China	Laishram Sarita Devi; India	Đoàn Thị Liên; Vietnam
Light bantamweight 54 kg	Zhang Qin; China	Laishram Sarita Devi; India	Tassamalee Thongjan; Thailand
Bantamweight; 57 kg	Peamwilai Laopeam; Thailand	Usha Nagisetty; India	Chisato Mizuno; Japan
Bantamweight; 57 kg	Peamwilai Laopeam; Thailand	Usha Nagisetty; India	Ngô Thị Chung; Vietnam
Featherweight; 60 kg	Dong Cheng; China	Mitchel Martinez; Philippines	Nguyễn Thị Vui; Vietnam
Featherweight; 60 kg	Dong Cheng; China	Mitchel Martinez; Philippines	Sumitra Ngoksungnoen; Thailand
Lightweight; 64 kg	Kavita Goyat; India	Saida Khassenova; Kazakhstan	Nguyễn Thị Thu Hương; Vietnam
Lightweight; 64 kg	Kavita Goyat; India	Saida Khassenova; Kazakhstan	Shahla Sekandari; Afghanistan
Light welterweight 69 kg	Yang Tingting; China	Lê Thị Hiền; Vietnam	Dariga Shakimova; Kazakhstan
Light welterweight 69 kg	Yang Tingting; China	Lê Thị Hiền; Vietnam	None awarded

== Medal table ==
Rank	Nation	Gold	Silver	Bronze	Total
1	China (CHN)	3	1	0	4
2	India (IND)	2	2	1	5
3	Vietnam (VIE)	1	2	4	7
4	Thailand (THA)	1	1	3	5
5	Philippines (PHI)	1	1	1	3
6	Kazakhstan (KAZ)	0	1	1	2
7	Afghanistan (AFG)	0	0	1	1
7	Chinese Taipei (TPE)	0	0	1	1
7	Japan (JPN)	0	0	1	1
7	Macau (MAC)	0	0	1	1
7	Sri Lanka (SRI)	0	0	1	1
Totals (11 entries)		8	8	15	31

== Results ==
=== 46 kg ===
Round 1; 30 October
Mari Murayama (JPN)	8
Anusha Koddithuwakku (SRI)	25

Quarterfinals; 1 November
Lo Yueh-ting (TPE)	9
Mary Kom (IND)	14
Josie Gabuco (PHI)	20
Chan Cho Weng (MAC)	0
Shabnam Rahimi (AFG)
Nguyễn Thị Hoa (VIE)	RSC
Mala Rai (NEP)	1
Anusha Koddithuwakku (SRI)	12

Semifinals; 2 November
Mary Kom (IND)	7
Josie Gabuco (PHI)	3
Nguyễn Thị Hoa (VIE)	14
Anusha Koddithuwakku (SRI)	4

Final; 4 November
Mary Kom (IND)	8
Nguyễn Thị Hoa (VIE)	6

=== 48 kg ===
Quarterfinals; 31 October		Semifinals; 2 November		Final; 4 November
		Lin Wan-ting (TPE)	1
Kumiko Ikehara (JPN)	5	Ngô Thị Phương (VIE)	8
Ngô Thị Phương (VIE)	17			Ngô Thị Phương (VIE)	18
Alice Aparri (PHI)	2			Lin Jinmei (CHN)	5
Lin Jinmei (CHN)	8	Lin Jinmei (CHN)	10
Nazgul Boranbayeva (KAZ)	4	Dueannapha Ngamlam (THA)	8
Dueannapha Ngamlam (THA)	10

=== 51 kg ===
Round 1; 30 October
Pin Meng-chieh (TPE)	10
Aya Shimmoto (JPN)	9
Annie Albania (PHI)	15
Zhaina Shekerbekova (KAZ)	5

Quarterfinals; 1 November
Sopida Satumrum (THA)	8
Lê Thị Ngân Hằng (VIE)	3
Sanju Lama (NEP)	4
Wong Sio Chao (MAC)	7
Chhoto Loura (IND)	10
Nilmini Jayasinghe (SRI)	2
Pin Meng-chieh (TPE)
Annie Albania (PHI)	KO

Semifinals; 2 November
Sopida Satumrum (THA)	14
Wong Sio Chao (MAC)	0
Chhoto Loura (IND)	0
Annie Albania (PHI)	6

Final; 4 November
Sopida Satumrum (THA)	4
Annie Albania (PHI)	12

=== 54 kg ===
Quarterfinals; 31 October
Laishram Sarita Devi (IND)	16
Ayako Minowa (JPN)	5
Sithari Sandareka (SRI)
Zhang Qin (CHN)	RSC
Nesthy Petecio (PHI)	3
Tassamalee Thongjan (THA)	6

Semifinals; 2 November
Đoàn Thị Liên (VIE)	3
Laishram Sarita Devi (IND)	25
Zhang Qin (CHN)	15
Tassamalee Thongjan (THA)	3

Final; 4 November
Laishram Sarita Devi (IND)	7
Zhang Qin (CHN)	9

=== 57 kg ===
Quarterfinals; 31 October
Oxana Koroleva (KAZ)	1
Usha Nagisetty (IND)	12
Ngô Thị Chung (VIE)	14
Niluka Karunaratne (SRI)	3

Semifinals; 2 November
Peamwilai Laopeam (THA)	15
Chisato Mizuno (JPN)	2
Usha Nagisetty (IND)	3
Ngô Thị Chung (VIE)	2

Final; 4 November
Peamwilai Laopeam (THA)	3
Usha Nagisetty (IND)	2

=== 60 kg ===
Semifinals; 2 November		Final; 4 November
Mitchel Martinez (PHI)	13
Nguyễn Thị Vui (VIE)	9	Mitchel Martinez (PHI)	3
Sumitra Ngoksungnoen (THA)	5	Dong Cheng (CHN)	18
Dong Cheng (CHN)	9

=== 64 kg ===
Semifinals; 1 November		Final; 4 November
Kavita Goyat (IND)	3
Nguyễn Thị Thu Hương (VIE)	2	Kavita Goyat (IND)	8
Saida Khassenova (KAZ)	RSC	Saida Khassenova (KAZ)	4
Shahla Sekandari (AFG)

=== 69 kg ===
Semifinals; 31 October		Final; 4 November
		Lê Thị Hiền (VIE)	1
Yang Tingting (CHN)	21	Yang Tingting (CHN)	23
Dariga Shakimova (KAZ)	6
