= Esports at the 2009 Asian Indoor Games =

- Venue: Gymnasium of Hanoi Technology
- Dates: 1–4 November 2009

Esports at the 2009 Asian Indoor Games was held in Gymnasium of Hanoi Technology, Vietnam from 1 November to 4 November 2009. There were six video games in the competition, FIFA 09, NBA Live 08, Need for Speed: Most Wanted, StarCraft: Brood War, Counter-Strike 1.6 and DotA Allstars.

== Medalists ==
Event	Gold	Silver	Bronze
FIFA 09	Davoud Khoei; Iran	Liu Xiao; China	Tô Trung Hiếu; Vietnam
FIFA 09	Davoud Khoei; Iran	Liu Xiao; China	Yang Zheng; China
NBA Live 08	Tohid Ghorbanifar; Iran	Farzan Homaei; Iran	Zhang Huajun; China
NBA Live 08	Tohid Ghorbanifar; Iran	Farzan Homaei; Iran	Talal Al-Meghaiseeb; Qatar
Need for Speed: Most Wanted	He Xuebin; China	Nguyễn Lê Văn; Vietnam	Naeim Hedayati; Iran
Need for Speed: Most Wanted	He Xuebin; China	Nguyễn Lê Văn; Vietnam	Sardorbek Abdullaev; Uzbekistan
StarCraft: Brood War	Lee Young-ho; South Korea	Jung Myung-hoon; South Korea	Yang Zheng; China
StarCraft: Brood War	Lee Young-ho; South Korea	Jung Myung-hoon; South Korea	He Xuebin; China
Counter-Strike 1.6	South Korea; Kang Keun-chul; Kim Min-soo; Pyeon Seon-ho; Lee Seung-wook; Lee Sung-jae	Uzbekistan; Dilshod Madjidov; Niyazi Ibragimov; Rishat Gizdelkhaov; Timur Nizamov; Tomas Yasyukyavichyus	Vietnam; Nguyễn Thế Gia; Hoàng Vũ Thành; Nguyễn Ngọc Thiên An; Nguyễn Quốc Hưng; Bùi Duy Nhung; Lê Xuân Hổ
Counter-Strike 1.6	South Korea; Kang Keun-chul; Kim Min-soo; Pyeon Seon-ho; Lee Seung-wook; Lee Sung-jae	Uzbekistan; Dilshod Madjidov; Niyazi Ibragimov; Rishat Gizdelkhaov; Timur Nizamov; Tomas Yasyukyavichyus	Mongolia; Enkhbayaryn Battsagaan; Sükhbaataryn Bayarsaikhan; Tsagaany Mönkhtüvshin; Ganbatyn Nyambat; Otgonbayaryn Sansar; Byambadorjiin Tsolmon
DotA Allstars	Vietnam; Lại Hồng Hải; Bùi Phương Thảo; Trần Minh Nhựt; Nguyễn Như Phúc; Huỳnh Văn Tân; Nguyễn Kim Khánh	Mongolia; Otgonbayaryn Sansar; Ganbatyn Nyambat; Enkhbayaryn Battsagaan; Tsagaany Mönkhtüvshin; Batboldyn Tamir	Uzbekistan; Rishat Gizdelkhaov; Niyazi Ibragimov; Dilshod Madjidov; Tomas Yasyukyavichyus; Timur Nizamov
DotA Allstars	Vietnam; Lại Hồng Hải; Bùi Phương Thảo; Trần Minh Nhựt; Nguyễn Như Phúc; Huỳnh Văn Tân; Nguyễn Kim Khánh	Mongolia; Otgonbayaryn Sansar; Ganbatyn Nyambat; Enkhbayaryn Battsagaan; Tsagaany Mönkhtüvshin; Batboldyn Tamir	None awarded

== Medal table ==
Rank	Nation	Gold	Silver	Bronze	Total
1	Iran (IRI)	2	1	1	4
2	South Korea (KOR)	2	1	0	3
3	China (CHN)	1	1	4	6
4	Vietnam (VIE)	1	1	2	4
5	Uzbekistan (UZB)	0	1	2	3
6	Mongolia (MGL)	0	1	1	2
7	Qatar (QAT)	0	0	1	1
Totals (7 entries)		6	6	11	23

== Results ==
=== FIFA 09 ===
==== Round 1 ====
1–2 November

Group A
Pos	Athlete	Pld	W	L	IRI	KOR	MGL	BRN
1	Meisam Hosseini (IRI)	3	3	0	—	2–1	3–0	WO
2	Kim Gwan-gyeon (KOR)	3	2	1	4–0, 0–4, 1–2	—	3–0	3–0
3	Byambasürengiin Lkhagvasüren (MGL)	3	1	2	1–4, 2–7, 0–6	2–3, 1–5, 1–6	—	3–0
4	Mohamed Al-Ghazali (BRN)	3	0	3		1–6, 0–12, 1–9	1–8, 1–9, 0–6	—

Group B
Pos	Athlete	Pld	W	L	VIE	CHN	UZB	KOR
1	Tô Trung Hiếu (VIE)	3	2	1	—	2–1	2–1	1–2
2	Liu Xiao (CHN)	3	2	1	6–7, 2–1, 4–5	—	2–1	2–1
3	Laziz Alimjanov (UZB)	3	1	2	2–7, 5–1, 2–2^{P}	2–3, 2–6, 2–1	—	3–0
4	Kim Jung-min (KOR)	3	1	2	2–3, 7–2, 5–2	4–2, 2–6, 2–3	3–5, 2–3, 2–3	—

Group C
Pos	Athlete	Pld	W	L	CHN	IRI	QAT	IND
1	Yang Zheng (CHN)	3	3	0	—	2–1	3–0	WO
2	Davoud Khoei (IRI)	3	2	1	3–1, 0–1, 0–1	—	3–0	3–0
3	Talal Al-Meghaiseeb (QAT)	3	1	2	1–5, 0–9, 0–4	3–14, 0–8, 0–4	—	3–0
4	Sarvesh Agarwal (IND)	3	0	3		0–7, 0–3, 0–3	0–1, 2–3, 1–4	—

Group D
Pos	Athlete	Pld	W	L	VIE	BRN	QAT	IND
1	Phạm Khắc Việt (VIE)	3	3	0	—	3–0	2–1	3–0
2	Ahmed Shukri (BRN)	3	2	1	0–4, 1–4, 0–5	—	2–1	3–0
3	Mohammed Al-Naama (QAT)	3	1	2	0–1, 2–5, 3–0	4–4^{P}, 2–1, 1–4	—	3–0
4	Vedant Hooda (IND)	3	0	3	1–7, 1–4, 0–3	0–10, 0–3, 0–3	0–8, 0–4, 0–9	—

Source: Official website

==== Knockout round ====
Quarterfinals; 2 November
Phạm Khắc Việt (VIE)	2	1
Davoud Khoei (IRI)	6	6
Kim Gwan-gyeon (KOR)	2	4	0
Tô Trung Hiếu (VIE)	3	2	5
Meisam Hosseini (IRI)	1^{P}	1	2
Liu Xiao (CHN)	1	7	5
Ahmed Shukri (BRN)	2	0
Yang Zheng (CHN)	3	5

Semifinals; 3 November
Davoud Khoei (IRI)	3	4
Tô Trung Hiếu (VIE)	1	2
Liu Xiao (CHN)	2	0	3
Yang Zheng (CHN)	1	1	2

Final; 3 November
Davoud Khoei (IRI)	8	2	6
Liu Xiao (CHN)	3	4	2
Bronze medal match
Tô Trung Hiếu (VIE)	1	2	2
Yang Zheng (CHN)	3	1	1

=== NBA Live 08 ===
2–3 November

Pos	Athlete	Pld	W	L	IRI	IRI	CHN	QAT
1	Tohid Ghorbanifar (IRI)	3	2	1	—	1–2	3–0	2–1
2	Farzan Homaei (IRI)	3	2	1	179–206, 183–112, 170–161	—	1–2	3–0
3	Zhang Huajun (CHN)	3	2	1	209–222, 211–218, 210–214	162–176, 40–0, 40–0	—	3–0
4	Talal Al-Meghaiseeb (QAT)	3	0	3	248–181, 154–251, 99–131	125–271, 156–244, 110–271	162–218, 172–234, 170–222	—

Source: Official website

=== Need for Speed: Most Wanted ===
==== Round 1 ====
1 November

Group A
Pos	Athlete	Pld	W	L	VIE	UZB	IRI	IND	QAT
1	Nguyễn Lê Văn (VIE)	4	4	0	—	2–0	2–0	2–0	WO
2	Sardorbek Abdullaev (UZB)	4	3	1	0–2	—	2–0	2–0	2–0
3	Mehdi Nazari (IRI)	4	2	2	0–2	0–2	—	2–0	2–0
4	Kabir Tomar (IND)	4	1	3	0–2	0–2	0–2	—	2–0
5	Mohammed Al-Romaihi (QAT)	4	0	4		0–2	0–2	0–2	—

Nguyễn Lê Văn (VIE)	2–0	Kabir Tomar (IND)	7:33.71–DNF	6:00.33–DNF
Mehdi Nazari (IRI)	0–2	Sardorbek Abdullaev (UZB)	6:42.62–6:24.23	DNF–6:10.20
Mehdi Nazari (IRI)	2–0	Kabir Tomar (IND)	7:17.89–DNF	8:08.17–DNF
Mohammed Al-Romaihi (QAT)	0–2	Sardorbek Abdullaev (UZB)	DNF–6:05.70	DNF–6:23.34
Mehdi Nazari (IRI)	0–2	Nguyễn Lê Văn (VIE)	6:21.08–6:06.25	DNF–7:56.42
Mohammed Al-Romaihi (QAT)	0–2	Kabir Tomar (IND)	8:47.41–8:19.01	8:52.12–8:44.26
Sardorbek Abdullaev (UZB)	0–2	Nguyễn Lê Văn (VIE)	6:23.53–6:21.93	7:35.18–7:34.11
Mehdi Nazari (IRI)	2–0	Mohammed Al-Romaihi (QAT)		
Mohammed Al-Romaihi (QAT)	0–2	Nguyễn Lê Văn (VIE)	Walkover	
Sardorbek Abdullaev (UZB)	2–0	Kabir Tomar (IND)		

Group B
Pos	Athlete	Pld	W	L	CHN	IRI	UZB	VIE	IND
1	He Xuebin (CHN)	4	4	0	—	2–1	2–1	2–0	2–0
2	Naeim Hedayati (IRI)	4	3	1	1–2	—	2–1	2–0	2–0
3	Doniyor Shamuzafarov (UZB)	4	2	2	1–2	1–2	—	2–0	2–0
4	Nguyễn Lê Minh (VIE)	4	1	3	0–2	0–2	0–2	—	2–0
5	Vedant Hooda (IND)	4	0	4	0–2	0–2	0–2	0–2	—

Source: Official website

Nguyễn Lê Minh (VIE)	2–0	Vedant Hooda (IND)	8:35.11–9:05.35	6:11.06–6:41.06	
Naeim Hedayati (IRI)	2–1	Doniyor Shamuzafarov (UZB)	6:02.16–6:04.48	8:01.00–7:56.00	5:55.57–5:56.18
Naeim Hedayati (IRI)	2–0	Vedant Hooda (IND)	5:54.10–DNF	8:37.99–DNF	
He Xuebin (CHN)	2–1	Doniyor Shamuzafarov (UZB)	7:31.84–7:36.24	7:53.12–7:50.82	6:03.38–6:05.00
Naeim Hedayati (IRI)	2–0	Nguyễn Lê Minh (VIE)	6:19.41–6:30.81	7:50.90–DNF	
He Xuebin (CHN)	2–0	Vedant Hooda (IND)	8:21.08–DNF	8:44.68–DNF	
Doniyor Shamuzafarov (UZB)	2–0	Nguyễn Lê Minh (VIE)			
Naeim Hedayati (IRI)	1–2	He Xuebin (CHN)			
He Xuebin (CHN)	2–0	Nguyễn Lê Minh (VIE)	7:31.28–7:52.62	6:20.12–6:33.81	
Doniyor Shamuzafarov (UZB)	2–0	Vedant Hooda (IND)	8:07.62–DNF	6:21.09–DNF	

==== Knockout round ====
2 November

Semifinals
Nguyễn Lê Văn (VIE)	6:03.76	7:31.43	5:56.23
Naeim Hedayati (IRI)	6:02.55	7:33.58	6:02.00
He Xuebin (CHN)	7:20.28	6:20.53
Sardorbek Abdullaev (UZB)	7:37.66	6:22.03

Final
Nguyễn Lê Văn (VIE)	7:32.26	6:04.55
He Xuebin (CHN)	7:31.31	6:02.43
Bronze medal match
Naeim Hedayati (IRI)	6:04.86	6:20.00
Sardorbek Abdullaev (UZB)	6:10.88	6:21.61

=== StarCraft: Brood War ===
==== Round 1 ====
3 November

Group A
Pos	Athlete	Pld	W	L	KOR	CHN	QAT
1	Jung Myung-hoon (KOR)	2	2	0	—	WO	1–0
2	He Xuebin (CHN)	2	1	1		—	1–0
3	Mohammed Al-Romaihi (QAT)	2	0	2	0–1	0–1	—

Group B
Pos	Athlete	Pld	W	L	KOR	CHN	QAT	IND
1	Lee Young-ho (KOR)	3	3	0	—	WO	1–0	1–0
2	Yang Zheng (CHN)	3	2	1		—	1–0	1–0
3	Mohammed Al-Naama (QAT)	3	1	2	0–1	0–1	—	1–0
4	Kabir Tomar (IND)	3	0	3	0–1	0–1	0–1	—

Source: Official website

==== Final round ====
4 November

Bronze medal match
He Xuebin (CHN)
Yang Zheng (CHN)	WO

Final
Jung Myung-hoon (KOR)	0
Lee Young-ho (KOR)	1

=== Counter-Strike 1.6 ===
2–4 November

Pos	Team	Pld	W	L	KOR	UZB	VIE	MGL	IRI
1	South Korea	4	4	0	—	2–1	2–0	2–0	WO
2	Uzbekistan	4	3	1	5–16, 16–9, 9–16	—	2–0	WO	WO
3	Vietnam	4	2	2	3–16, 1–16	8–16, 10–16	—	2–0	WO
4	Mongolia	4	1	3	1–16, 0–16		3–16, 3–16	—	WO
5	Iran	4	0	4					—

Source: Official website

=== DotA Allstars ===
1 November

Pos	Team	Pld	W	L	VIE	MGL	UZB
1	Vietnam	2	2	0	—	1–0	1–0
2	Mongolia	2	1	1	0–1	—	1–0
3	Uzbekistan	2	0	2	0–1	0–1	—

Source: Official website
