= Bowling at the 2009 Asian Indoor Games =

- Venue: Superbowl Center
- Dates: 1–7 November 2009

Bowling at the 2009 Asian Indoor Games was held in Superbowl Center, Ho Chi Minh City, Vietnam from 1 November to 7 November 2009.

== Medalists ==
=== Men ===
Event	Gold	Silver	Bronze
Singles	Nayef Eqab; United Arab Emirates	Choi Bok-eum; South Korea	Biboy Rivera; Philippines
Singles	Nayef Eqab; United Arab Emirates	Choi Bok-eum; South Korea	Jasem Al-Saqer; Kuwait
Doubles	United Arab Emirates; Hussain Nasir Al-Suwaidi; Nayef Eqab	South Korea; Choi Bok-eum; Kim Tae-young	Hong Kong; Wu Siu Hong; Eric Tseng
Doubles	United Arab Emirates; Hussain Nasir Al-Suwaidi; Nayef Eqab	South Korea; Choi Bok-eum; Kim Tae-young	Indonesia; Ryan Leonard Lalisang; Hengki Susanto
Team of 4	United Arab Emirates; Sayed Ibrahim Al-Hashemi; Shaker Ali Al-Hassan; Hussain Nasir Al-Suwaidi; Nayef Eqab	Malaysia; Syafiq Ridhwan; Kang Bo Long; Rodson Tong; Kelvin Keong	South Korea; Choi Bok-eum; Kim Tae-young; Cho Young-seon; Jang Dong-chul
Team of 4	United Arab Emirates; Sayed Ibrahim Al-Hashemi; Shaker Ali Al-Hassan; Hussain Nasir Al-Suwaidi; Nayef Eqab	Malaysia; Syafiq Ridhwan; Kang Bo Long; Rodson Tong; Kelvin Keong	Kuwait; Mohammad Al-Zaidan; Khaled Al-Debayyan; Basel Al-Anzi; Jasem Al-Saqer

=== Women ===
Event	Gold	Silver	Bronze
Singles	Son Yun-hee; South Korea	Maki Sano; Japan	Shayna Ng; Singapore
Singles	Son Yun-hee; South Korea	Maki Sano; Japan	Tannya Roumimper; Indonesia
Doubles	South Korea; Jeon Eun-hee; Son Yun-hee	Malaysia; Fatin Syazliana Nasution; Jane Sin	Malaysia; Sharon Koh; Tengku Emanina Laily
Doubles	South Korea; Jeon Eun-hee; Son Yun-hee	Malaysia; Fatin Syazliana Nasution; Jane Sin	Chinese Taipei; Wang Ya-ting; Pan Yu-fen
Team of 4	South Korea; Hwang Sun-ok; Jeon Eun-hee; Gang Hye-eun; Son Yun-hee	Japan; Maki Sano; Kazumi Satoh; Natsumi Koizumi; Rina Asada	Malaysia; Jane Sin; Sharon Koh; Fatin Syazliana; Tengku Emanina Laily
Team of 4	South Korea; Hwang Sun-ok; Jeon Eun-hee; Gang Hye-eun; Son Yun-hee	Japan; Maki Sano; Kazumi Satoh; Natsumi Koizumi; Rina Asada	Hong Kong; Chan Shuk Han; Vanessa Fung; Milki Ng; Katherine Lau

== Medal table ==
Rank	Nation	Gold	Silver	Bronze	Total
1	South Korea (KOR)	3	2	1	6
2	United Arab Emirates (UAE)	3	0	0	3
3	Malaysia (MAS)	0	2	2	4
4	Japan (JPN)	0	2	0	2
5	Hong Kong (HKG)	0	0	2	2
5	Indonesia (INA)	0	0	2	2
5	Kuwait (KUW)	0	0	2	2
8	Chinese Taipei (TPE)	0	0	1	1
8	Philippines (PHI)	0	0	1	1
8	Singapore (SIN)	0	0	1	1
Totals (10 entries)		6	6	12	24

== Results ==
=== Men ===
==== Singles ====
1 November

===== Round 1 =====
Rank	Athlete	Score
1	Jang Dong-chul (KOR)	1496
2	Yannaphon Larpapharat (THA)	1463
3	Surasak Manuwong (THA)	1397
4	Biboy Rivera (PHI)	1386
5	Yoshinao Masatoki (JPN)	1377
6	Choi Bok-eum (KOR)	1367
7	Jasem Al-Saqer (KUW)	1358
8	Nayef Eqab (UAE)	1346
9	Rodson Tong (MAS)	1309
10	Ryan Leonard Lalisang (INA)	1300
11	Hussain Nasir Al-Suwaidi (UAE)	1299
12	Kim Tae-young (KOR)	1294
13	Cho Young-seon (KOR)	1290
14	Mansour Al-Awami (QAT)	1276
15	Mubarak Al-Merikhi (QAT)	1276
16	Syafiq Ridhwan (MAS)	1275
17	Khalid Al-Hamdan (KSA)	1271
18	Wu Siu Hong (HKG)	1270
19	Basil Low (SIN)	1265
20	Basel Al-Anzi (KUW)	1263
21	Sithiphol Kunaksorn (THA)	1260
22	Somjed Kusonphithak (THA)	1260
23	Benjamin Lim (SIN)	1257
24	Mark Wong (SIN)	1256
25	Eric Tseng (HKG)	1254
26	Kang Bo Long (MAS)	1252
27	Choi Io Fai (MAC)	1251
28	Salem Al-Marzouqi (QAT)	1250
29	Mohammad Al-Zaidan (KUW)	1244
30	Chester King (PHI)	1235
31	Wicky Yeung (HKG)	1226
32	Faisal Al-Juraifani (KSA)	1226
33	Shogo Wada (JPN)	1222
34	Shaker Ali Al-Hassan (UAE)	1212
35	Sayed Ibrahim Al-Hashemi (UAE)	1212
36	Hisashi Obara (JPN)	1197
37	Dennis Ranova Pulunggono (INA)	1196
38	Raoul Miranda (PHI)	1195
39	Krishna Dasari Vijay (IND)	1177
40	Lionel Lim (SIN)	1172
41	Nguyễn Thành Phố (VIE)	1172
42	Jonas Baltasar (PHI)	1170
43	Hengki Susanto (INA)	1165
44	Kelvin Keong (MAS)	1165
45	Rajmohan Palaniappan (IND)	1152
46	Ngô Xuân Giang (VIE)	1149
47	Said Al-Hinai (OMA)	1138
48	Jose Manuel Machon (MAC)	1131
49	Masaru Ito (JPN)	1125
50	Khaled Al-Debayyan (KUW)	1125
51	Trần Bình Minh (VIE)	1116
52	Leong Kin Keong (MAC)	1111
53	Ammar Tarrad (KSA)	1109
54	Khalid Al-Dosari (QAT)	1104
55	Man Si Kei (MAC)	1097
56	Rangga Dwichandra Yudhira (INA)	1090
57	Abhishek Maheshwari (IND)	1075
58	Mohamed Al-Hashemi (OMA)	1067
59	Sergey Sapov (UZB)	1067
60	Fahad Al-Juraifani (KSA)	1049
61	Lê Công Hùng (VIE)	1046
62	Cyrus Cheung (HKG)	1038
63	Dilbir Singh (IND)	1022
64	Kudrat Khilyamov (UZB)	1000
65	Viktor Smirnov (UZB)	987
66	Bakhtiyor Dalabaev (UZB)	983
67	Moosa Al-Maimani (OMA)	983
68	Konstantin Izhboldin (KAZ)	977
69	Makhmut Iskhakov (KAZ)	969
70	Ghalib Al-Busaidi (OMA)	958
71	Gennadiy Vologin (KAZ)	943
72	Saeed Al-Hushail (YEM)	910
73	German Roshonok (KAZ)	900

===== Knockout round =====
Quarterfinals		Semifinals		Final
Surasak Manuwong (THA)	162
Choi Bok-eum (KOR)	238	Choi Bok-eum (KOR)	289
Yannaphon Larpapharat (THA)	216	Jasem Al-Saqer (KUW)	226
Jasem Al-Saqer (KUW)	218			Choi Bok-eum (KOR)	219
Biboy Rivera (PHI)	205			Nayef Eqab (UAE)	222
Yoshinao Masatoki (JPN)	194	Biboy Rivera (PHI)	194
Jang Dong-chul (KOR)	183	Nayef Eqab (UAE)	219
Nayef Eqab (UAE)	279

==== Doubles ====
3 November

===== Round 1 =====
Rank	Team	Score
1	United Arab Emirates (UAE); Hussain Nasir Al-Suwaidi; Nayef Eqab	2744^{46}
2	South Korea (KOR); Choi Bok-eum; Kim Tae-young	2744^{28}
3	South Korea (KOR); Cho Young-seon; Jang Dong-chul	2649
4	Hong Kong (HKG); Wu Siu Hong; Eric Tseng	2618
5	Singapore (SIN); Mark Wong; Benjamin Lim	2598
6	Indonesia (INA); Ryan Leonard Lalisang; Hengki Susanto	2564
7	Japan (JPN); Hisashi Obara; Shogo Wada	2532
8	Thailand (THA); Somjed Kusonphithak; Yannaphon Larpapharat	2519
9	Kuwait (KUW); Mohammad Al-Zaidan; Khaled Al-Debayyan	2518
9	Qatar (QAT); Khalid Al-Dosari; Salem Al-Marzouqi	2518
11	Philippines (PHI); Biboy Rivera; Chester King	2505
12	Saudi Arabia (KSA); Khalid Al-Hamdan; Faisal Al-Juraifani	2503
13	Qatar (QAT); Mubarak Al-Merikhi; Mansour Al-Awami	2496
14	Hong Kong (HKG); Cyrus Cheung; Wicky Yeung	2483
15	Thailand (THA); Sithiphol Kunaksorn; Surasak Manuwong	2480
16	Japan (JPN); Masaru Ito; Yoshinao Masatoki	2477
17	Kuwait (KUW); Basel Al-Anzi; Jasem Al-Saqer	2476
18	India (IND); Dilbir Singh; Krishna Dasari Vijay	2469
19	Philippines (PHI); Raoul Miranda; Jonas Baltasar	2450
20	Macau (MAC); Choi Io Fai; Jose Manuel Machon	2442
21	Malaysia (MAS); Kang Bo Long; Kelvin Keong	2440
22	Singapore (SIN); Lionel Lim; Basil Low	2429
23	Malaysia (MAS); Syafiq Ridhwan; Rodson Tong	2416
24	United Arab Emirates (UAE); Sayed Ibrahim Al-Hashemi; Shaker Ali Al-Hassan	2403
25	Macau (MAC); Leong Kin Keong; Man Si Kei	2338
26	Indonesia (INA); Dennis Ranova Pulunggono; Rangga Dwichandra Yudhira	2316
27	Oman (OMA); Moosa Al-Maimani; Mohamed Al-Hashemi	2239
28	Uzbekistan (UZB); Sergey Sapov; Viktor Smirnov	2232
29	Kazakhstan (KAZ); Gennadiy Vologin; German Roshonok	2223
30	Vietnam (VIE); Ngô Xuân Giang; Nguyễn Thành Phố	2202
31	Uzbekistan (UZB); Bakhtiyor Dalabaev; Kudrat Khilyamov	2199
32	Saudi Arabia (KSA); Ammar Tarrad; Fahad Al-Juraifani	2196
32	India (IND); Abhishek Maheshwari; Rajmohan Palaniappan	2196
34	Vietnam (VIE); Trần Bình Minh; Lê Công Hùng	2164
35	Oman (OMA); Said Al-Hinai; Ghalib Al-Busaidi	2093
36	Kazakhstan (KAZ); Konstantin Izhboldin; Makhmut Iskhakov	1974

===== Knockout round =====
Quarterfinals		Semifinals		Final
Hussain Nasir Al-Suwaidi (UAE); Nayef Eqab (UAE)	469
Somjed Kusonphithak (THA); Yannaphon Larpapharat (THA)	379	Hussain Nasir Al-Suwaidi (UAE); Nayef Eqab (UAE)	493
Cho Young-seon (KOR); Jang Dong-chul (KOR)	420	Ryan Leonard Lalisang (INA); Hengki Susanto (INA)	411
Ryan Leonard Lalisang (INA); Hengki Susanto (INA)	427			Hussain Nasir Al-Suwaidi (UAE); Nayef Eqab (UAE)	431
Choi Bok-eum (KOR); Kim Tae-young (KOR)	432			Choi Bok-eum (KOR); Kim Tae-young (KOR)	430
Hisashi Obara (JPN); Shogo Wada (JPN)	382	Choi Bok-eum (KOR); Kim Tae-young (KOR)	492
Wu Siu Hong (HKG); Eric Tseng (HKG)	416	Wu Siu Hong (HKG); Eric Tseng (HKG)	385
Mark Wong (SIN); Benjamin Lim (SIN)	396

==== Team of 4 ====
===== Round 1 =====
5–6 November

Rank	Team	Score
1	South Korea (KOR)	5405
2	Kuwait (KUW)	5219
3	Malaysia (MAS)	5203
4	United Arab Emirates (UAE)	5195
5	Indonesia (INA)	5143
6	Thailand (THA)	5137
7	Singapore (SIN)	5091
8	Japan (JPN)	5054
9	Philippines (PHI)	5046
10	Qatar (QAT)	4951
11	Hong Kong (HKG)	4874
12	Macau (MAC)	4541
13	Saudi Arabia (KSA)	4461
14	Vietnam (VIE)	4430
15	Uzbekistan (UZB)	4425
16	India (IND)	4385
17	Oman (OMA)	4382
18	Kazakhstan (KAZ)	3816

===== Knockout round =====
7 November

Semifinals		Final
Kuwait	764
Malaysia	773	Malaysia	788
South Korea	719	United Arab Emirates	829
United Arab Emirates	845

=== Women ===
==== Singles ====
2 November

===== Round 1 =====
Rank	Athlete	Score
1	Son Yun-hee (KOR)	1300^{50}
2	Maki Sano (JPN)	1300^{18}
3	Shayna Ng (SIN)	1231
4	Tannya Roumimper (INA)	1227
5	Liza del Rosario (PHI)	1219
6	Fok Ka Wai (SIN)	1210
7	Jeon Eun-hee (KOR)	1203
8	Wang Ya-ting (TPE)	1200
9	Kazumi Satoh (JPN)	1194
10	Sharon Limansantoso (INA)	1190
11	Mades Arles (PHI)	1186
12	Gang Hye-eun (KOR)	1183
13	Natsumi Koizumi (JPN)	1175
14	Sharon Koh (MAS)	1171
15	Milki Ng (HKG)	1160
16	Daphne Tan (SIN)	1159
17	Fatin Syazliana (MAS)	1157
18	Choi Kit Fan (MAC)	1156
19	Vanessa Fung (HKG)	1148
20	Nguyễn Thị Huyền Thảo (VIE)	1140
21	Tippayasukol Kunaksorn (THA)	1139
22	Huỳnh Ngọc Diễm Thùy (VIE)	1138
23	Gina Lim (SIN)	1137
24	Tsai Hsin-yi (TPE)	1135
25	Pan Yu-fen (TPE)	1134
26	Yang Hao-ting (TPE)	1134
27	Benchawan Poungthong (THA)	1134
28	Kimberly Lao (PHI)	1131
29	Novie Phang (INA)	1129
30	Apinyata Jonbumrung (THA)	1129
31	Putty Armein (INA)	1128
32	Jane Sin (MAS)	1128
33	Chan Shuk Han (HKG)	1121
34	Hwang Sun-ok (KOR)	1108
35	Tengku Emanina Laily (MAS)	1100
36	Yanee Saebe (THA)	1100
37	Katherine Lau (HKG)	1078
38	Yuen Nga Lai (MAC)	1070
39	Krizziah Tabora (PHI)	1064
40	Trần Ngân Ngọc (VIE)	1059
41	Rina Asada (JPN)	1041
42	Ku Sok Va (MAC)	1038
43	Yelena Grishinenko (KAZ)	1028
44	Yelena Zemtsova (KAZ)	1008
45	Un Im Cheng (MAC)	1002
46	Hanadi Al-Mezaiel (KUW)	996
47	Nguyễn Thị Thanh Hương (VIE)	960
48	Yelena Izhboldina (KAZ)	951
49	Zhanar Uzakbayeva (KAZ)	767

===== Knockout round =====
Quarterfinals		Semifinals		Final
Son Yun-hee (KOR)	236
Wang Ya-ting (TPE)	187	Son Yun-hee (KOR)	206
Tannya Roumimper (INA)	195	Tannya Roumimper (INA)	192
Liza del Rosario (PHI)	179			Son Yun-hee (KOR)	193
Maki Sano (JPN)	179			Maki Sano (JPN)	158
Jeon Eun-hee (KOR)	172	Maki Sano (JPN)	211
Shayna Ng (SIN)	202	Shayna Ng (SIN)	172
Fok Ka Wai (SIN)	143

==== Doubles ====
4 November

===== Round 1 =====
Rank	Team	Score
1	South Korea (KOR); Jeon Eun-hee; Son Yun-hee	2589
2	Indonesia (INA); Tannya Roumimper; Putty Armein	2515
3	Singapore (SIN); Daphne Tan; Gina Lim	2498
4	Indonesia (INA); Sharon Limansantoso; Novie Phang	2414
5	Malaysia (MAS); Jane Sin; Fatin Syazliana	2412
6	Malaysia (MAS); Sharon Koh; Tengku Emanina Laily	2397
7	Chinese Taipei (TPE); Wang Ya-ting; Pan Yu-fen	2389
8	Japan (JPN); Natsumi Koizumi; Rina Asada	2365
9	South Korea (KOR); Hwang Sun-ok; Gang Hye-eun	2359
10	Philippines (PHI); Liza del Rosario; Mades Arles	2330
11	Vietnam (VIE); Nguyễn Thị Huyền Thảo; Huỳnh Ngọc Diễm Thùy	2327
12	Chinese Taipei (TPE); Yang Hao-ting; Tsai Hsin-yi	2318
13	Japan (JPN); Maki Sano; Kazumi Satoh	2295
14	Macau (MAC); Un Im Cheng; Ku Sok Va	2277
15	Singapore (SIN); Shayna Ng; Fok Ka Wai	2267
16	Philippines (PHI); Krizziah Tabora; Kimberly Lao	2262
17	Hong Kong (HKG); Chan Shuk Han; Katherine Lau	2262
18	Thailand (THA); Yanee Saebe; Benchawan Poungthong	2225
19	Hong Kong (HKG); Vanessa Fung; Milki Ng	2205
20	Thailand (THA); Tippayasukol Kunaksorn; Apinyata Jonbumrung	2168
21	Vietnam (VIE); Nguyễn Thị Thanh Hương; Trần Ngân Ngọc	2156
22	Macau (MAC); Choi Kit Fan; Yuen Nga Lai	2127
23	Kazakhstan (KAZ); Yelena Grishinenko; Yelena Izhboldina	2033
24	Kazakhstan (KAZ); Yelena Zemtsova; Zhanar Uzakbayeva	1901

===== Knockout round =====
Quarterfinals		Semifinals		Final
Jeon Eun-hee (KOR); Son Yun-hee (KOR)	462
Natsumi Koizumi (JPN); Rina Asada (JPN)	351	Jeon Eun-hee (KOR); Son Yun-hee (KOR)	452
Tannya Roumimper (INA); Putty Armein (INA)	310	Wang Ya-ting (TPE); Pan Yu-fen (TPE)	364
Wang Ya-ting (TPE); Pan Yu-fen (TPE)	343			Jeon Eun-hee (KOR); Son Yun-hee (KOR)	432
Sharon Limansantoso (INA); Novie Phang (INA)	409			Jane Sin (MAS); Fatin Syazliana (MAS)	393
Jane Sin (MAS); Fatin Syazliana (MAS)	475	Jane Sin (MAS); Fatin Syazliana (MAS)	407
Daphne Tan (SIN); Gina Lim (SIN)	436	Sharon Koh (MAS); Tengku Emanina Laily (MAS)	365
Sharon Koh (MAS); Tengku Emanina Laily (MAS)	475

==== Team of 4 ====
===== Round 1 =====
5–6 November

Rank	Team	Score
1	South Korea (KOR)	5185
2	Malaysia (MAS)	4814
3	Japan (JPN)	4783
4	Hong Kong (HKG)	4743
5	Chinese Taipei (TPE)	4713
6	Indonesia (INA)	4711
7	Philippines (PHI)	4669
8	Singapore (SIN)	4589
9	Thailand (THA)	4485
10	Vietnam (VIE)	4402
11	Macau (MAC)	4016
12	Kazakhstan (KAZ)	3723

===== Knockout round =====
7 November

Semifinals		Final
South Korea	807
Hong Kong	706	South Korea	895
Malaysia	770	Japan	696
Japan	867
