= Sepak takraw at the 2009 Asian Indoor Games =

- Venue: Hà Đông Competition Hall
- Dates: 31 October – 2 November 2009

Hoop sepak takraw was contested at the 2009 Asian Indoor Games in Hanoi, Vietnam from October 31 to November 2. The competition took place at the Ha Dong Competition Hall.

== Medalists ==
Event	Gold	Silver	Bronze
Men	Thailand; Chaiya Wattano; Ekachai Masuk; Narachai Chumeungkusol; Saharat Ounumpai; Thanaiwat Yoosuk; Wattana Jaiyan	Indonesia; Miftakhul Arief; Sugeng Samsul Arifin; Suko Hartono; Wisnu Dwi Suhantoro; Yudi Purnomo	Iran; Bahman Abdevali; Eslam Gharehmoshk; Majed Sarlak; Majid Salmani; Mohammad Rezaei; Mohsen Padidar
Men	Thailand; Chaiya Wattano; Ekachai Masuk; Narachai Chumeungkusol; Saharat Ounumpai; Thanaiwat Yoosuk; Wattana Jaiyan	Indonesia; Miftakhul Arief; Sugeng Samsul Arifin; Suko Hartono; Wisnu Dwi Suhantoro; Yudi Purnomo	Vietnam; Nguyễn Quốc Huy; Nguyễn Thanh Vũ; Lê Văn Mạnh; Phạm Viết Thành; Lưu Vĩnh Lợi; Nguyễn Xuân Tùng
Women	Thailand; Jiraporn Choochuen; Kantinan Sochaiyan; Kobkul Chinchaiyaphum; Srirat Pongsavakul; Viparat Ruangrat; Wanwisa Pomparsit	Vietnam; Nguyễn Thị Minh Trang; Nguyễn Thái Linh; Nguyễn Thị Hoa; Nguyễn Thị Quyên; Trần Thị Thu Hằng; Cao Thị Yến	Indonesia; Alberthin Suryani; Dini Mita Sari; Hasmawati Umar; Jumasiah; Nur Qadriyanti
Women	Thailand; Jiraporn Choochuen; Kantinan Sochaiyan; Kobkul Chinchaiyaphum; Srirat Pongsavakul; Viparat Ruangrat; Wanwisa Pomparsit	Vietnam; Nguyễn Thị Minh Trang; Nguyễn Thái Linh; Nguyễn Thị Hoa; Nguyễn Thị Quyên; Trần Thị Thu Hằng; Cao Thị Yến	South Korea; Bae Han-oul; Park Keum-duk; Kim Mi-jin; Lee Min-ju; Ahn Soon-ok; Yu Yeong-sim

== Medal table ==
Rank	Nation	Gold	Silver	Bronze	Total
1	Thailand (THA)	2	0	0	2
2	Indonesia (INA)	0	1	1	2
2	Vietnam (VIE)	0	1	1	2
4	Iran (IRI)	0	0	1	1
4	South Korea (KOR)	0	0	1	1
Totals (5 entries)		2	2	4	8

== Results ==
=== Men ===
==== Preliminary round ====
31 October – 1 November

Rank	Team	Round 1	Round 2
1	Thailand	920	840
2	Indonesia	650	650
3	Iran	570	620
4	Vietnam	540	590
5	India	370	340
6	Japan	310	330
7	Malaysia	220	230

==== Knockout round ====
2 November

Semifinals		Final
Thailand	830
Vietnam	540	Thailand	920
Indonesia	690	Indonesia	680
Iran	670

=== Women ===
==== Preliminary round ====
31 October – 1 November

Rank	Team	Round 1	Round 2
1	Vietnam	580	710
2	Thailand	670	690
3	Indonesia	580	570
4	South Korea	300	280
5	India	200	190

==== Knockout round ====
2 November

Semifinals		Final
Vietnam	530
South Korea	250	Vietnam	570
Thailand	670	Thailand	590
Indonesia	590
