= Fantasy (gamer) =

South Korean professional esports player

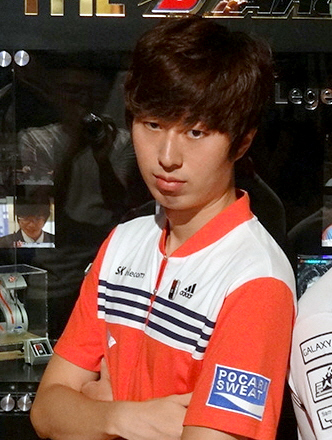

Personal information
- Name: Jung Myung-hoon
- Nationality: South Korean

Current team
- Team: SANDBOX Challengers
- Role: Head coach
- Game: League of Legends
- League: LCK Challengers League

Career information
- Games: StarCraft; League of Legends
- Playing career: 2007–2019 (StarCraft)
- Role: Terran
- Coaching career: 2019–present (LoL)

Team history

As player:
- 2007–2014: SK Telecom T1
- 2014–2015: Dead Pixels
- 2019: Pixel 1

As coach:
- 2020: SANDBOX Gaming
- 2021–present: SANDBOX Challengers
Medal record
Esports
Representing South Korea
Asian Indoor and Martial Arts Games
Silver medal – second place	2009 Vietnam	StarCraft: Brood War

Jung Myung-hoon, known as By.Fantasy or Fantasy, is a South Korean League of Legends head coach for SANDBOX Challengers of the LCK Challengers League. Formerly a StarCraft and StarCraft2 player, he is one of 3 Terrans to be under the wing of Choi "iloveoov" Yeon-sung.

== StarCraft playing career ==
Jung is known as a Terran innovator in professional StarCraft, taking one gold and three silver medals in the OnGameNet Starleague. Jung is also known for his 3–0 performance in the biggest competition in professional Korean StarCraft, the 2008–2009 Shinhan Bank Proleague Finals, in which he defeated his Zerg rival Lee Jae-dong twice to carry his team, SK Telecom T1, to the championship. Since then his performances in Proleague and individual leagues have proved him one of the best Terran players in the game. In the final OnGameNet Starleague for Starcraft: Brood War, the 2012 Tving OSL, Fantasy took 2nd place losing to JangBi in the finals. Jung retired from professional StarCraft competition in 2019.

== League of Legends coaching career ==
He joined SANDBOX Gaming as a League of Legends coach in November 2019. In November 2020, Jung moved to Sandbox Gaming's academy team, SANDBOX Challengers, as their head coach.

== Tournament results ==
- 2nd — 2012 Tving OnGameNet Starleague
- 2nd — 2011 Jin Air OnGameNet Starleague
- 1st — 2010 Bacchus OnGameNet Starleague
- 2nd — 2009 Batoo OnGameNet Starleague
- 2nd — 2008 Incruit OnGameNet Starleague
- 3–0 win record in 2008-09 Proleague Final

== See also ==
- StarCraft professional competition
