= Anusha Koddithuwakku =

Sri Lankan boxer (born 1978)

Personal information
- Full name: Anusha Koddithuwakku Dilrukshi
- Born: 27 December 1978 (age 47) Dambadeniya
- Height: 163 cm (5 ft 4 in)
- Weight: 48 kg (106 lb)

Sport
- Sport: Boxing
- Event: women's light flyweight 48kg
Medal record
Women's boxing
Representing Sri Lanka
South Asian Games
Silver medal – second place	2016 Guwahati	48kg
Commonwealth Games
Bronze medal – third place	2018 Gold Coast	48kg
Asian Indoor Games
Bronze medal – third place	2009 Hanoi	46kg pinweight

Anusha Koddithuwakku Dirukshi (born 27 December 1978), also known as Anusha Koddithuwakku, is a Sri Lankan boxer who generally competes in light flyweight event. She has competed in several international competitions including the AIBA Women's World Boxing Championships in 2012, 2014 and 2016.

Anusha Koddithuwakku rose to prominence at the international boxing arena after securing a silver medal in the women's 48kg fly lightweight event during the 2016 South Asian Games losing to veteran Indian boxing world champion Mery Kom. In the final of the women's lightweight event at the 2016 South Asian Games, she sustained leg injuries and also her leg was broken by Mery Kom.

Anusha also selected to represent Sri Lanka at the 2018 Commonwealth Games which was also her maiden Commonwealth Games appearance at the age of 39 and competed in the boxing events. She started the tournament well with reaching the semi-final round and was scheduled to face her arch-rival Mery Kom who is 35 years old in the semifinal again after the 2016 South Asian Games final. With reaching the semi-final stage, Anusha became the first Sri Lankan female boxer ever to qualify for the semi-final round in a boxing event at the Commonwealth Games. During the semi-final clash on April 11, Mery Kom managed to beat Anusha Koddithuwakku comfortably 5–0 to secure a final round berth. After losing the semifinal, Anusha was awarded the bronze medal which was also Sri Lanka's 4th medal at the 2018 Commonwealth Games. This was also the first ever medal received by a Sri Lankan in boxing at the history of Commonwealth Games after 68 years since Albert Perera's gold medal achievement at the 1950 Commonwealth Games. She too became the first Sri Lankan woman boxer to clinch a Commonwealth Games medal in boxing.
