= Philippines at the 2009 Asian Indoor Games =

- IOC code: PHI
- NOC: Philippine Olympic Committee
- Website: www.olympic.ph (in English)

in Hanoi
- Competitors: 23 in 6 sports
- Medals Ranked 20th: Gold 1 Silver 4 Bronze 5 Total 10

Asian Indoor Games appearances
- 2005; 2007; 2009; 2013; 2017; 2021; 2025

The Philippines participated in the 2009 Asian Indoor Games held in Hanoi, Vietnam from October 28 to November 8 with 138 athletes competing in 17 sport events. It won 1 gold, 4 silver and 5 bronze medals.

== Medalists ==
=== Gold ===
No.	Medal	Name	Sport	Event
1	Gold	Annie Albania	Boxing	Women's Flyweight 51kg

=== Silver ===
No.	Medal	Name	Sport	Event
1	Silver	Mitchel Martinez	Boxing	Women's Featherweight 60kg
2	Silver	Miguel Molina	Short course swimming	Men's Individual Medley 200m
3	Silver	Rhea May Rifani	Wushu	Women's Sanda 52kg
4	Silver	Maricel Subang	Muay Thai	Women's Flyweight 48– 51kg

=== Bronze ===
No.	Medal	Name	Sport	Event
1	Bronze	Engelberto Rivera	Bowling	Men's Singles
2	Bronze	Josie Gabuco	Boxing	Women's Pinweight 46kg
3	Bronze	Jennifer Lagilag	Wushu	Women's Sanda 48kg
4	Bronze	Zaidi Laruan	Muay Thai	Men's Lightweight 57–60kg
5	Bronze	Jay Harold Gregorio	Muay Thai	Men's Welterweight 63.5–67kg

== Medal summary ==
=== By sports ===
Sport	Gold	Silver	Bronze	Total
Boxing	1	1	1	3
Muay Thai	0	1	2	3
Wushu	0	1	1	2
Short course swimming	0	1	0	1
Bowling	0	0	1	1
Totals (5 entries)	1	4	5	10
