= Josie Gabuco =

Filipino boxer

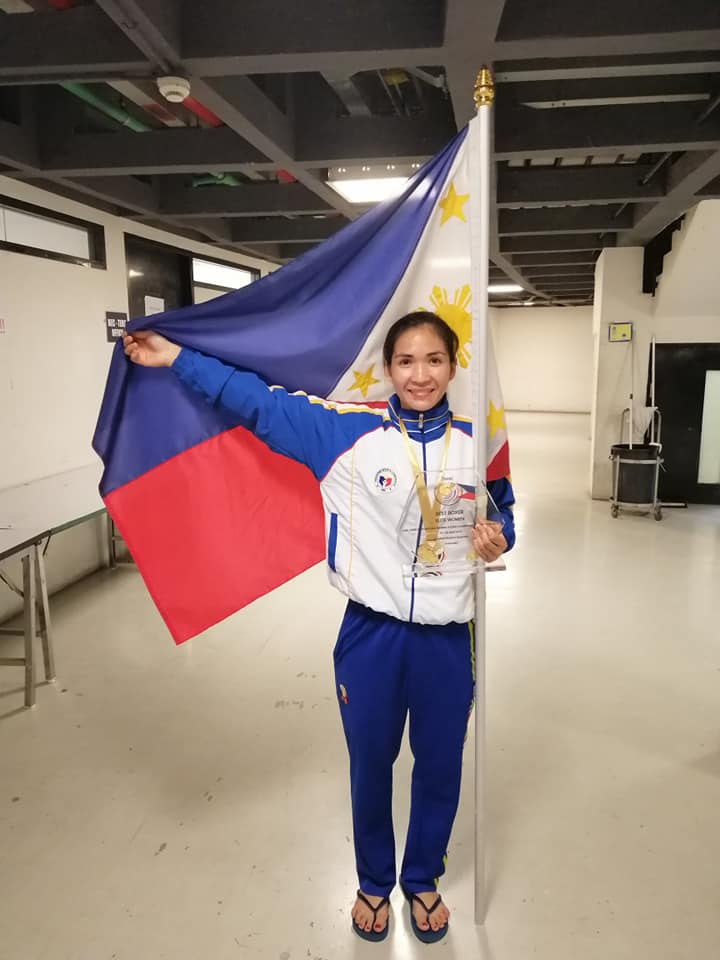
- Josie Gabuco poses with the Philippine flag after winning a gold medal in the 2019 Asian Amateur Boxing Championships.

Personal information
- Nationality: Filipino
- Born: March 30, 1987 (age 39) Puerto Princesa, Palawan
- Height: 152 cm (5 ft 0 in)
- Weight: Pinweight, Light Flyweight

Boxing career
Medal record
Women's boxing
Representing the Philippines
Event	1st	2nd	3rd
World Championships	1	0	1
Asian Championships	1	0	1
Asian Indoor Games	0	0	1
Southeast Asian Games	5	0	1
Total	7	0	4
World Championships
Gold medal – first place	2012 Qinhuangdao	Light flyweight
Bronze medal – third place	2008 Ningbo	Pinweight
Asian Championships
Gold medal – first place	2019 Bangkok	Light flyweight
Bronze medal – third place	2021 Dubai	Light flyweight
Asian Indoor Games
Bronze medal – third place	2009 Hanoi	Pinweight
Southeast Asian Games
Gold medal – first place	2009 Vientiane	Pinweight
Gold medal – first place	2011 Jakarta	Pinweight
Gold medal – first place	2013 Naypyidaw	Light flyweight
Gold medal – first place	2015 Singapore	Light flyweight
Gold medal – first place	2019 Philippines	Light flyweight
Bronze medal – third place	2021 Vietnam	Light flyweight

Josie Gabuco (born March 30, 1987) is a Filipina boxer best known for winning her country's first ever gold medal in the AIBA Women's World Boxing Championships. She is also the most successful boxer in the history of the Southeast Asian Games with a record five gold medals.

== Early life and education ==
A native of Puerto Princesa, Palawan, Gabuco was born on March 30, 1987. She took up the sport of boxing in 2003 with the intention of using it as a means to enter a college under a scholarship program. She was able to attend the STI College in Manila where she pursued a course on Criminology.

== Career ==
Gabuco earned a slot in the Philippine national team after winning gold at the 2004 National Open. Gabuco first made international headlines in 2008 when she won a bronze medal in the pinweight division at the AIBA Women's World Boxing Championships held in Ningbo.

In 2009, she captured a bronze medal in the Asian Indoor Games in Hanoi and claimed her first SEA Games gold medal in Vientiane later that year. She successfully defended her pinweight title in the 2011 Southeast Asian Games in Palembang.

She won the first gold medal for the Philippines in the AIBA Women's World Boxing Championships in 2012 after ruling the light flyweight category.

2012 World Championships Results

- Defeated Yairineth Altuve (Venezuela) PTS (24–13)
- Defeated Derya Aktop (Turkey) PTS (27–10)
- Defeated Kim Klavel (Canada) PTS (21–15)
- Defeated Svetlana Gnevanova (Russia) PTS (12–7)
- Defeated Xu Shiqi (China) PTS (10–9)

For her feat, Gabuco was named one of the four recipients of the 2012 Athlete of the Year Award by the Philippine Sportswriters Association along with fellow boxer, Nonito Donaire Jr. and the Ateneo Blue Eagles and women's national softball team.

In 2013, Gabuco became the first Filipina boxer to win three gold medals in the SEA Games after ruling the light flyweight class in Naypyidaw. Gabuco competed as a flyweight in the 2014 Asian Games in Incheon but lost to Vietnam's Le Thi Bang in the quarterfinals.

She trimmed down to light flyweight at the 2015 Southeast Asian Games in Singapore where she captured a record fourth gold medal. Thus, Gabuco became just the second Filipino boxer to win four gold medals in the SEA Games after Arlo Chavez in the 1990s. She was denied a chance for a fifth consecutive SEAG gold medal after women's boxing was scrapped from the 2017 Southeast Asian Games calendar.

At the 2019 Asian Amateur Boxing Championships in Bangkok, Thailand, Gabuco clinched a gold medal in the light flyweight division after winning over Kim Hyang-mi of North Korea in the final bout.

Gabuco won a record fifth gold medal at the 2019 Southeast Asian Games after defeating Indonesian Endang in the light flyweight final despite nursing a flu. She became just the second boxer in SEAG history to win five gold medals after Thailand's Somjit Jongjohor.

== Personal life ==
Gabuco is a single mother and has a son. She is also enlisted in the Philippine Navy.
