= He Yanzhu =

Chinese judoka

He Yanzhu (born January 5, 1982, in Qinhuangdao, Hebei) is a male Chinese judoka who competed at the 2008 Summer Olympics in the Middleweight (81–90 kg) event.

== Major performances ==
- 2005 National Games - 3rd;
- 2006 National Championships/National Champions Tournament - 1st;
- 2007 Birmingham World Cup - 5th -90 kg class

== See also ==
- China at the 2008 Summer Olympics
