= Farinaz Lari =

Iranian kickboxer (born 1987)

- Born: March 21, 1987 (age 39); Iran
- Other names: Spitfire
- Nationality: (Iran) (Canada) Iranian-Canadian
- Height: 1.66 m (5 ft 5 1/2 in)
- Weight: 52.0 kg (114.6 lb; 8.19 st)
- Division: Strawweight
- Style: Kickboxing, Muay Thai
- Trainer: Ali Dagger Khanjari
- Rank: Number One ranked fighter in the 52 kg World K-1 Rules WAKO.

Other information
- Spouse: Ali Khanjari
- Last updated on: November 2, 2017

Farinaz Lari (born March 21, 1987) is an Iranian kickboxer. She was the first Iranian woman to win the World Kickboxing Championships. She is currently the 52 kg World Number Five ranked contender in K-1 Rules WAKO as of November 2017.

== Achievements ==
- Sport Accord World Combat Games 2013 Bronze Medalist (-52 kg)

World Combat Games 2013

- World Kickboxing Championships 2013 (WAKO) -52 kg, Gold medalist
- Asian Kickboxing Championships (WAKO) India, Silver medalist (2012) -52 kg
- Member of Kickboxing Women committee, (WAKO) 2011

Wako Women Committee

- Kickboxing World Cup Diamond -52 kg (2011), Gold medalist
- 3rd Asian Indoor Games Kickboxing championships -52 kg (2009), Silver Medalist

3rd Asian Indoor Games 2009

- Winner of professional fight versus Thailand -51 kg (2008)
- National Youth Gymnastics Championships (1998) Gold Medalist
- National Kickboxing Championships -48 kg Gold Medalist (2006)
- Provençal Kickboxing Championships -48 kg Bronze Medalist (2007)
- National Kickboxing Championships -48 kg Gold Medalist (2007)
- National Muaythai Championships -51 kg Gold Medalist (2008)
- Member of Iran Muaythai National Team (2008)
- Member of Iran Kickboxing National Team (2009–2013)
