= Shiva Amini =

Iranian futsal player

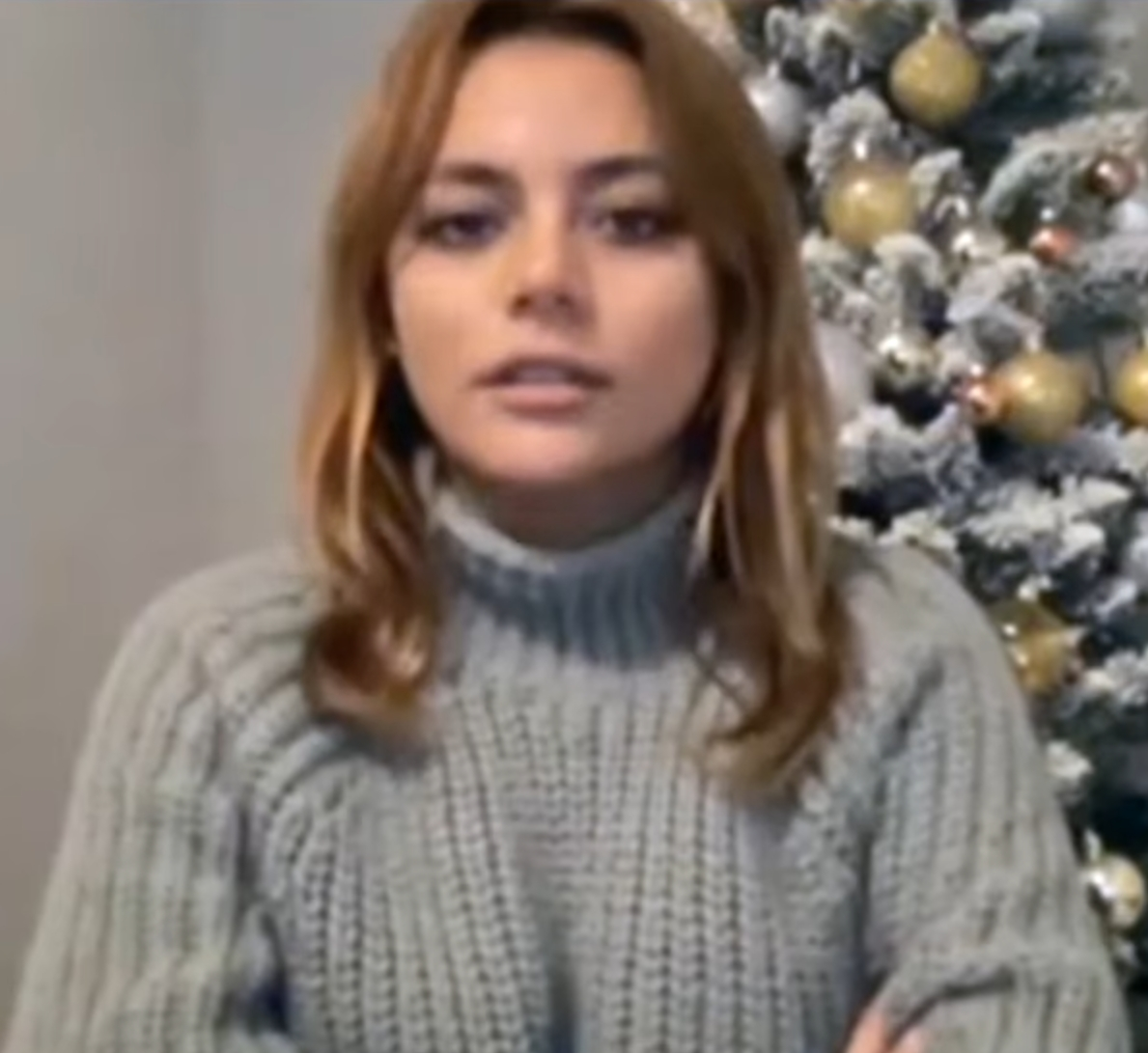
- Shiva Amini in 2022

Personal information
- Full name: Shiva Amini
- Date of birth: 1988 or 1989 (age 37–38)
- Place of birth: Iran

Senior career*
Years	Team	Apps	(Gls)
2010-2011	Matin Varamin	35	(19)

International career
2010-2011	Iran	18	(6)
- * Club domestic league appearances and goals

Shiva Amini (Persian: شیوا امینی) is an Iranian women's futsal player formerly playing for Iran national team and former Iranian Women's Futsal Premier League club, Matin Varamin, based in Varamin, a city 56 km south-east of Tehran. She emigrated from Iran in 2017 and lived in Switzerland. Since 2009, she was no longer included in the national team because she had published pictures of herself without hijab during one of her foreign trips and had played futsal with boys. Finally, the Iranian Islamic Republic regime's harassment forced her to leave Iran and seek asylum in Switzerland. She was a youth futsal coach in Switzerland. She currently lives in the United States of America with her husband, Brenden O’Connor.
