= Hossein Ghomi =

Iranian judoka

Medal record

Representing Iran

Men's Judo

Asian Championships
| Bronze medal – third place | 2008 Jeju City | 90 kg |

Men's Kurash

Asian Indoor Games
| Gold medal – first place | 2009 Hanoi | 90 kg |

Asian Championships
| Gold medal – first place | 2008 Tehran | 90 kg |

Hossein Ghomi (born 28 October 1982) is an Iranian judoka.

He finished in joint fifth place in the middleweight (90 kg) division at the 2006 Asian Games, having lost to Ramziddin Sayidov of Uzbekistan in the bronze medal match.
