= South Korea at the 2009 Asian Indoor Games =

- IOC code: KOR
- NOC: Korean Olympic Committee

in Hanoi
- Competitors: 102 in 14 sports
- Medals Ranked 6th: Gold 16 Silver 14 Bronze 16 Total 46

Asian Indoor Games appearances
- 2005; 2007; 2009; 2013; 2017; 2021; 2026

South Korea participated in the 2009 Asian Indoor Games in Hanoi, Vietnam on 30 October – 8 November 2009. It won 16 gold, 14 silver and 16 bronze medals.

== Medal summary ==
=== Medal table ===
Sport	Gold	Silver	Bronze	Total
Finswimming	5	4	4	13
Indoor archery	4	1	1	6
Bowling	3	2	1	6
Electronic sports	2	1	0	3
Cue sports	2	0	1	3
Dancesport	0	4	3	7
Aerobic gymnastics	0	2	2	4
Short course swimming	0	0	3	3
Hoop takraw	0	0	1	1
Totals (9 entries)	16	14	16	46
