= Parviz Sobirov =

Tajikistani judoka

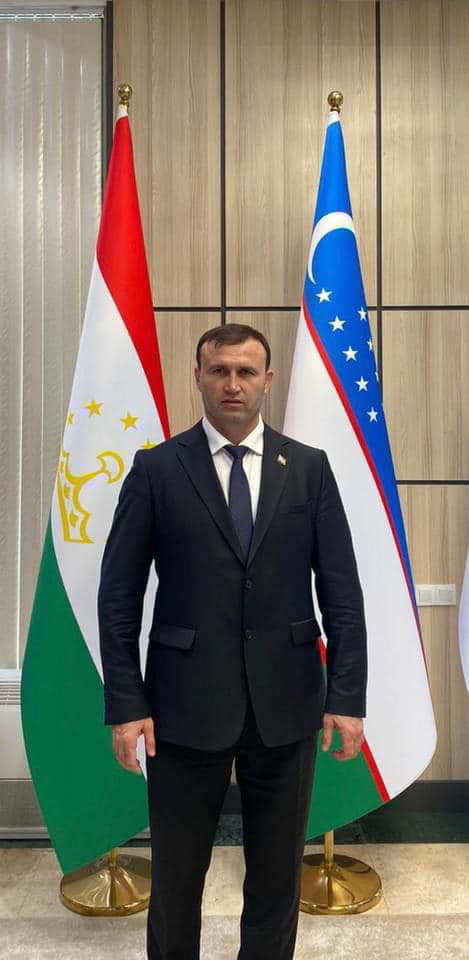
- SCO summit 2022

Personal information
- Born: 12 November 1980 (age 45)
- Height: 1.8 m (5 ft 11 in)
- Weight: 90 kg (200 lb)

Sport
- Country: Tajikistan
- Sport: Judo
- Event: -90kg
- Updated on 23 July 2012

Parviz Sobirov (born 12 November 1980) is a Tajikistani judoka.

Parviz finished in joint fifth place in the middleweight (90 kg) division at the 2006 Asian Games. He lost to Hiroshi Izumi of Japan in the bronze medal match.

Born in Temurmalik District, he currently resides in Dushanbe.
