= Afghanistan at the 2009 Asian Indoor Games =

- IOC code: AFG
- NOC: Afghanistan National Olympic Committee

in Hanoi
- Competitors: 14 in 7 sports
- Medals Ranked 26th: Gold 0 Silver 2 Bronze 2 Total 4

Asian Indoor Games appearances
- 2007; 2009; 2013; 2017; 2021; 2025

Afghanistan participated in the 2009 Asian Indoor Games in Hanoi, Vietnam on 30 October – 8 November 2009.

== Medal winners ==
Medal	Name	Sport	Event	Date
Silver	Nader Khan Sultani	Billiard - Sports	Men's Single Snooker	
Silver	Abdul Wahed Wahedi	Kurash	Men's - 60 kg	
Bronze	Shahla Sekandari	Boxing	Women's Light Weight 64 kg	
Bronze	Ekramuddin Ahmadi	Kurash	Men's -90 kg	
