= Iraq at the 2009 Asian Indoor Games =

- IOC code: IRQ
- NOC: National Olympic Committee of Iraq

in Hanoi
- Competitors: 42 in 9 sports
- Medals Ranked 25th: Gold 0 Silver 2 Bronze 4 Total 6

Asian Indoor Games appearances
- 2005; 2007; 2009; 2013; 2017; 2021; 2025

Iraq participated in the 2009 Asian Indoor Games in Hanoi, Vietnam on 30 October – 8 November 2009.

== Medal winners ==
Medal	Name	Sport	Event	Date
Silver	Gulustan Mahmood Ieso	Athletics	Women's Track 400m	
Silver	Ahmed Abdulzahra	Kick Boxing	Men's Semi contact - 63 kg	
Bronze	Adnan Taes Al-Mntfage	Athletics	Men's Track 800m	
Bronze	Basim Al-Sarray	Kick Boxing	Men's Low kick - 51 kg	
Bronze	Rana Mohammed Al-Zaidi	Muay	Women's Light (57 – 60 kg)	
Bronze	Ahmed Nazeen	Wushu	Women's 60 kg	
