= India at the 2009 Asian Indoor Games =

- IOC code: IND
- NOC: Indian Olympic Association

in Hanoi
- Competitors: 170 in 19 sports
- Medals Ranked 7th: Gold 6 Silver 9 Bronze 25 Total 40

Asian Indoor Games appearances
- 2005; 2007; 2009; 2013; 2017; 2021; 2025

India participated in the 2009 Asian Indoor Games held in Hanoi, Vietnam from October 28 to November 8. India won 6 gold, 9 silver and 25 bronze medals at the games.

== Medalists ==
| Medal | Name | Sport | Event | Date |
|---|---|---|---|---|
| Gold | Pratiksha Santosh Shinde | Vovinam | Women's Single Performance | November 1 |
| Gold | M. C. Mary Kom | Boxing | Women's Boxing 48 kg | November 4 |
| Silver | Ratnadiptee Kamalakar Shimpi | Kick Boxing | Women's Boxing 50 kg | November 7 |
| Gold | Kavita Kumari | Boxing | Women's Boxing 64 kg | November 4 |
| Silver | Pratiksha Santosh Shinde & Akanksha Sahai | Vovinam | Women's Fighting 50 kg | November 1 |
