= 2019 Six-red World Championship =

6-red snooker tournament, held September 2019

- Logo for the 2019 championship which was sponsored by SangSom

Tournament information
- Dates: 2–7 September 2019
- Venue: Bangkok Convention Center
- City: Bangkok
- Country: Thailand
- Organisation: WPBSA
- Format: Six-red snooker
- Total prize fund: 10,500,000 baht
- Winner's share: 4,000,000 baht
- Highest break: Thepchaiya Un-Nooh (THA) (A maximum break in six-red snooker is 75)

Final
- Champion: Stephen Maguire (SCO)
- Runner-up: John Higgins (SCO)
- Score: 8–6

The 2019 Six-red World Championship (also known as the 2019 SangSom Six-red World Championship for sponsorship reasons) was a six-red snooker invitational tournament held between 2 and 7 September 2019 at the Bangkok Convention Center in Bangkok, Thailand. The event was the 2019 edition of the Six-red World Championship, first held in 2008. The event's final was contested by Scots Stephen Maguire and John Higgins who had won the 2019 World Cup doubles competition as a pair earlier in the season. Maguire won the event, defeating Higgins 8–6. The win was Maguire's first singles tournament victory since 2014.

Kyren Wilson won the previous year's event, but lost in the first knockout round to David Gilbert 4–6. The event saw a prize fund of 10,500,000 baht, with 4,000,000 baht awarded to the winner. Only one maximum break of 75 was made during the event, by Thepchaiya Un-Nooh. The event was sponsored by Thai rum producers SangSom.

== Prize money ==
A total of 4,000,000 Thai baht (£105,000, as of 2019) was awarded to the winner of the event, with a total prize fund of 10,500,000 baht (£277,000). The championships were sponsored by Thai rum producers SangSom. The breakdown of prize money is shown below.

- Winner: 4,000,000 baht
- Runner-up: 1,300,000 baht
- Semi-finalists: 750,000 baht
- Quarter-finalists: 375,000 baht
- Last 16: 150,000 baht
- Third in group: 75,000 baht
- Fourth in group: 50,000 baht
- Total: 10,500,000 baht

== Tournament summary ==
The 2019 Six-red World Championship was a professional invitational snooker event held between 2 and 7 September 2019. The championship was contested under the six-red variant of snooker, with only six reds being used instead of the traditional fifteen. Invited players first competed in round-robin groups of four, the top two from each group progressing to a knockout round. The knockout rounds were first contested as best-of-11-frames matches up until the semi-final, which were played as best-of-13-frames, and the final played as best-of-15-frames.

=== Group stages ===
The 32 invited players were split into eight groups of four players, with best-of-9-frame matches. Defending champion Kyren Wilson progressed alongside Thailand's amateur player Passakorn Suwannawat in group A. Suwannawat defeated Wilson during the group stage 5–2, leaving Wilson to have to defeat Mohammed Shehab to progress in the final group match. Stephen Maguire won all three of his group games in group B, with amateur player Wu Yize in second place. Wu won only one game in the group, but finished above Luca Brecel on frame difference.

Ding Junhui finished above Joe Perry after a 5–3 win in group C with both progressing. The group also contained one of the tournament's two female players in Reanne Evans, plus Noppon Saengkham. Gary Wilson defeated three-time world champion Mark Selby 5–4 in the second round of matches to progress. Selby joined Wilson after defeating Sunny Akani 5–2. The 2019 Riga Masters champion Yan Bingtao finished second in group E, despite being whitewashed by John Higgins 5–0, who won the group, after winning all three group games.

David Gilbert won group F ahead of 2019 World Seniors Championship winner Jimmy White in second. White defeated amateur player Mohamed Khairy 5–2 to progress. Stuart Bingham, the 2015 world champion won group G, only losing four frames in the three matches. Bingham progressed with Ali Carter in second place. Mark Williams won group H after defeating 2006 world champion Graeme Dott 5–4. Dott joined Williams in the knockout round after a defeat of Thailand's Thepchaiya Un-Nooh. Un-Nooh made the only maximum break of the event during the match.

=== Knockout rounds ===
The knockout portion of the event was contested over four rounds, starting 5 September, with the final played 7 September 2019. In total, three former winners of the event progressed into the quarter-finals. Mark Williams, winner in 2017 defeated Joe Perry 6–1 and 2016 winner Ding Junhui defeated Graeme Dott 6–4. The 2014 winner Stephen Maguire defeated Jimmy White 6–5 despite being behind at 3–5, and won the match on the final black ball. However, defending champion Kyren Wilson lost in his match against David Gilbert 4–6. The sole remaining Thai player Passakorn Suwannawat lost in the last 16 to Ali Carter 5–6. Elsewhere, Stuart Bingham defeated Mark Selby 6–2, Gary Wilson defeated Yan Bingtao on a deciding frame 6–5, and John Higgins defeated Wu Yize 6–4.

The first quarter-final saw Stephen Maguire defeat Ali Carter 6–2. Gary Wilson played Ding Junhui with the winner to play Maguire. Ding led 5–4, and had Wilson requiring snookers, but still lost the match 5–6. In a rematch of the 2019 World Snooker Championship semi-final, Dave Gilbert played John Higgins in the quarter-final. Higgins defeated Gilbert 6–4 to progress to the semi-finals. After taking all of the first four frames, Mark Williams defeated Stuart Bingham 6–3 to set up a rematch of the 2018 World Snooker Championship final against Higgins. Maguire won the first semi-final over Wilson, 7–5. Higgins defeated Williams by the same scoreline to meet Maguire in the final.

The final was played on 7 September 2019, as a best-of-15-frames match. The match was contested between two players who had formed the winning Scotland pair at the 2019 World Cup, Maguire and Higgins. Maguire had won the event previously, in 2014, where he had defeated Ricky Walden in the final. Maguire took the first three frames, before Higgins led winning the next four frames. Maguire won both frame eight, and frame nine on the final black to lead 5–4. Maguire won the tenth frame and Higgins the eleventh. Higgins made the only 50+ break of the match to tie at 6–6. Maguire won the next two frames to win the match, and the championship 8–6. Maguire commented that he was "lucky" to win the tournament, but the result still "felt good". The win was Maguire's first singles tournament victory since the 2014 Lisbon Open.

== Results ==
=== Group stage ===
The tournament was split into two sections, with a round-robin group stage, followed by a single-elimination tournament. There were a total of eight groups of four, played from 2 to 4 September. The top two players from each group qualified for the knock-out stage with all matches being played as best-of-nine-frames. Positions within the group were decided by the number of matches won and then, in the event of a tie, by frame difference. Where two players were still tied, the result of the match between them determined their positions.

==== Group A ====
Position	Player	MP	Won	Lost	Frames won	Frames lost	Frame difference
1	Passakorn Suwannawat (THA)	3	3	0	15	7	+8
2	Kyren Wilson (ENG)	3	2	1	12	9	+3
3	Anthony McGill (SCO)	3	1	2	8	13	−5
4	Mohammed Shehab (UAE)	3	0	3	9	15	−6

- **Kyren Wilson 5**–2 Anthony McGill
- **Passakorn Suwannawat 5**–4 Mohammed Shehab
- **Kyren Wilson 5**–2 Mohammed Shehab
- **Passakorn Suwannawat 5**–1 Anthony McGill
- **Passakorn Suwannawat 5**–2 Kyren Wilson
- **Anthony McGill 5**–3 Mohammed Shehab

==== Group B ====
Position	Player	MP	Won	Lost	Frames won	Frames lost	Frame difference
1	Stephen Maguire (SCO)	3	3	0	15	3	+12
2	Wu Yize (CHN)	3	1	2	9	10	−1
3	Luca Brecel (BEL)	3	1	2	8	13	−5
4	Kritsanut Lertsattayathorn (THA)	3	1	2	7	13	−6

- **Wu Yize 5**–0 Kritsanut Lertsattayathorn
- **Stephen Maguire 5**–0 Luca Brecel
- **Stephen Maguire 5**–1 Wu Yize
- **Kritsanut Lertsattayathorn 5**–3 Luca Brecel
- **Stephen Maguire 5**–2 Kritsanut Lertsattayathorn
- **Luca Brecel 5**–3 Wu Yize

==== Group C ====
Position	Player	MP	Won	Lost	Frames won	Frames lost	Frame difference
1	Ding Junhui (CHN)	3	3	0	15	8	+7
2	Joe Perry (ENG)	3	2	1	13	9	+4
3	Noppon Saengkham (THA)	3	1	2	12	11	+1
4	Reanne Evans (ENG)	3	0	3	3	15	−12

- **Ding Junhui 5**–3 Joe Perry
- **Noppon Saengkham 5**–1 Reanne Evans
- **Ding Junhui 5**–3 Noppon Saengkham
- **Joe Perry 5**–0 Reanne Evans
- **Ding Junhui 5**–2 Reanne Evans
- **Joe Perry 5**–4 Noppon Saengkham

==== Group D ====
Position	Player	MP	Won	Lost	Frames won	Frames lost	Frame difference
1	Gary Wilson (ENG)	3	3	0	15	8	+7
2	Mark Selby (ENG)	3	2	1	14	8	+6
3	Sunny Akani (THA)	3	1	2	10	11	−1
4	Bernard Tey Choon Kiat (SIN)	3	0	3	3	15	−12

- **Gary Wilson 5**–3 Sunny Akani
- **Mark Selby 5**–1 Bernard Tey Choon Kiat
- **Gary Wilson 5**–4 Mark Selby
- **Sunny Akani 5**–1 Bernard Tey Choon Kiat
- **Mark Selby 5**–2 Sunny Akani
- **Gary Wilson 5**–1 Bernard Tey Choon Kiat

==== Group E ====
Position	Player	MP	Won	Lost	Frames won	Frames lost	Frame difference
1	John Higgins (SCO)	3	3	0	15	6	+9
2	Yan Bingtao (CHN)	3	2	1	10	9	+1
3	James Wattana (THA)	3	1	2	9	12	−3
4	Kurt Dunham (AUS)	3	0	3	8	15	−7

- **John Higgins 5**–3 James Wattana
- **Yan Bingtao 5**–3 Kurt Dunham
- **John Higgins 5**–0 Yan Bingtao
- **James Wattana 5**–2 Kurt Dunham
- **John Higgins 5**–3 Kurt Dunham
- **Yan Bingtao 5**–1 James Wattana

==== Group F ====
Position	Player	MP	Won	Lost	Frames won	Frames lost	Frame difference
1	David Gilbert (ENG)	3	3	0	15	8	+7
2	Jimmy White (ENG)	3	2	1	13	10	+3
3	Ryan Day (WAL)	3	1	2	12	11	+1
4	Mohamed Khairy (EGY)	3	0	3	4	15	−11

- **David Gilbert 5**–3 Jimmy White
- **Ryan Day 5**–1 Mohamed Khairy
- **David Gilbert 5**–2 Mohamed Khairy
- **Jimmy White 5**–4 Ryan Day
- **David Gilbert 5**–3 Ryan Day
- **Jimmy White 5**–1 Mohamed Khairy

==== Group G ====
Position	Player	MP	Won	Lost	Frames won	Frames lost	Frame difference
1	Stuart Bingham (ENG)	3	3	0	15	4	+11
2	Ali Carter (ENG)	3	2	1	11	9	+2
3	Ken Doherty (IRL)	3	1	2	12	12	0
4	Alexis Callewaert (FRA)	3	0	3	2	15	−13

- **Stuart Bingham 5**–3 Ken Doherty
- **Ali Carter 5**–0 Alexis Callewaert
- **Stuart Bingham 5**–0 Alexis Callewaert
- **Ali Carter 5**–4 Ken Doherty
- **Stuart Bingham 5**–1 Ali Carter
- **Ken Doherty 5**–2 Alexis Callewaert

==== Group H ====
Position	Player	MP	Won	Lost	Frames won	Frames lost	Frame difference
1	Mark Williams (WAL)	3	3	0	15	7	+8
2	Graeme Dott (SCO)	3	2	1	14	10	+4
3	Thepchaiya Un-Nooh (THA)	3	1	2	10	13	−3
4	Ng On-yee (HKG)	3	0	3	6	15	−9

- **Mark Williams 5**–2 Thepchaiya Un-Nooh
- **Graeme Dott 5**–2 Ng On-yee
- **Mark Williams 5**–4 Graeme Dott
- **Thepchaiya Un-Nooh 5**–3 Ng On-yee
- **Mark Williams 5**–1 Ng On-yee
- **Graeme Dott 5**–3 Thepchaiya Un-Nooh

=== Knockout stage ===
The last 16 matches and quarter-finals were played on 5 September, the semi-finals on 6 September and the final on 7 September. Players in bold denote match winners.

**Last 16**; Best of 11 frames
(Thailand) Passakorn Suwannawat	5
**(England) Ali Carter**	**6**
**(Scotland) Stephen Maguire**	**6**
(England) Jimmy White	5
**(China) Ding Junhui**	**6**
(Scotland) Graeme Dott	4
**(England) Gary Wilson**	**6**
(China) Yan Bingtao	5
**(Scotland) John Higgins**	**6**
(China) Wu Yize	4
**(England) David Gilbert**	**6**
(England) Kyren Wilson	4
**(England) Stuart Bingham**	**6**
(England) Mark Selby	2
**(Wales) Mark Williams**	**6**
(England) Joe Perry	1

**Quarter-finals**; Best of 11 frames
(England) Ali Carter	2
**(Scotland) Stephen Maguire**	**6**
(China) Ding Junhui	5
**(England) Gary Wilson**	**6**
**(Scotland) John Higgins**	**6**
(England) David Gilbert	4
(England) Stuart Bingham	3
**(Wales) Mark Williams**	**6**

**Semi-finals**; Best of 13 frames
**(Scotland) Stephen Maguire**	**7**
(England) Gary Wilson	5
**(Scotland) John Higgins**	**7**
(Wales) Mark Williams	5

**Final**; Best of 15 frames
**(Scotland) Stephen Maguire**	**8**
(Scotland) John Higgins	6

=== Final ===
The final was played as a best-of-15-frames match, on 7 September 2019. Scores in bold denote the winner of the frame, whilst a score in brackets denotes a break of over 50.

Final: Best of 15 frames. Bangkok Convention Center, Bangkok, Thailand, 7 September 2019.
**Stephen Maguire**; Scotland	**8**–6	John Higgins; Scotland
**41**–23, **49**–1, **48**–0, 1–**49**, 20–**29**, 19–**33**, 0–**67**, **40**–7, **30**–29, **43**–0, 30–**41**, 4–**57** (57), **39**–0, **34**–18
47	Highest break	**57**
0	50+ breaks	1

== Maximum breaks ==
A maximum break in six-red snooker is 75. Only one maximum break was scored at the event, by Thepchaiya Un-Nooh.
