= Mohammed Shehab =

Emirati snooker player

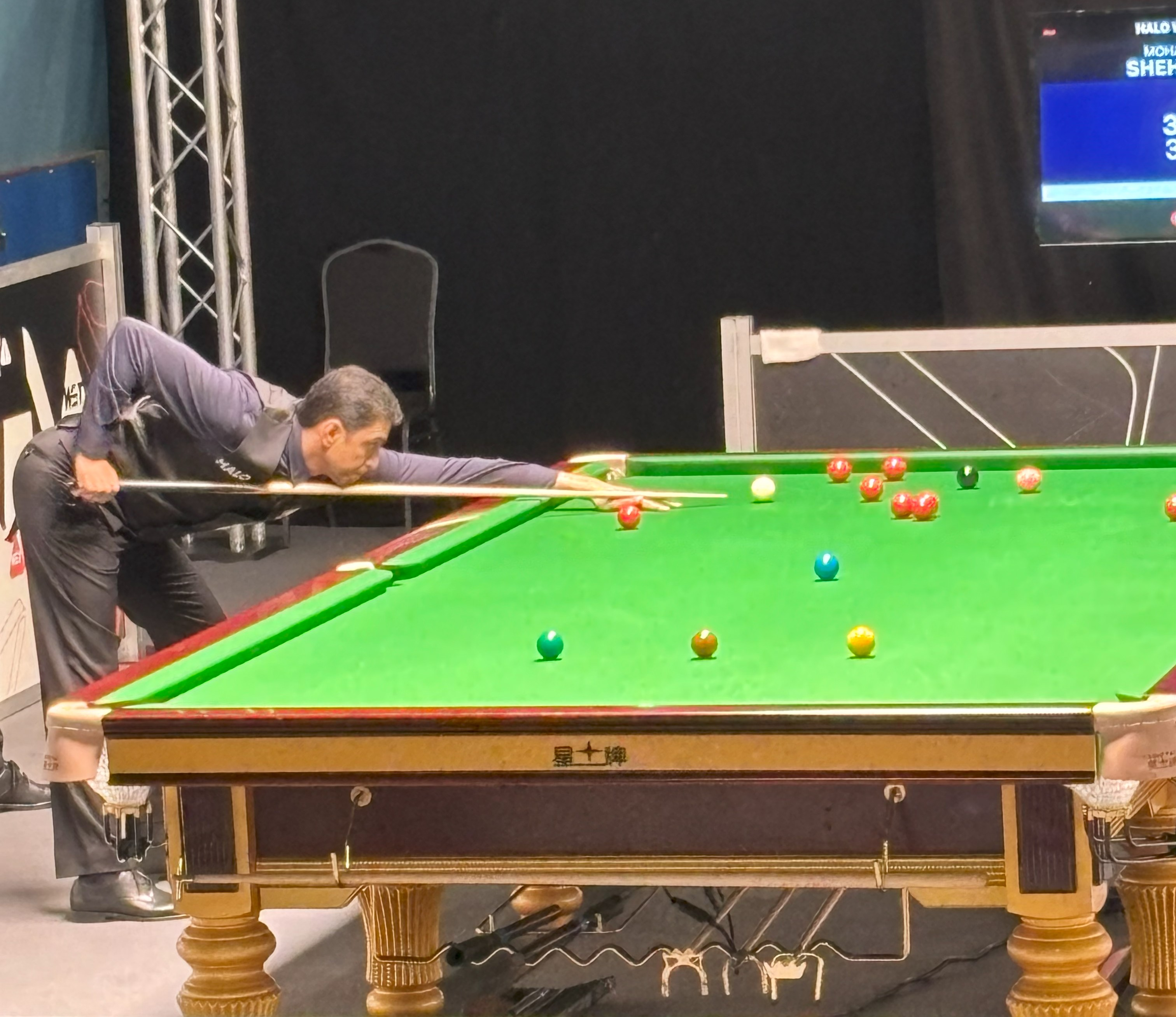
- Shehab at the qualifying competition for the 2025 World Snooker Championship

Personal information
- Born: 11 December 1976 (age 49) Abu Dhabi

Sport
- Country: United Arab Emirates
- Sport: Snooker
- Professional: 1996/1997, 2006/2007, 2024-2026
- Highest ranking: 90 (2006/2007)
- Best ranking finish: Last 80 (2007 Malta Cup)
Medal record
Men's snooker
Representing United Arab Emirates
World Games
Bronze medal – third place	2009 Kaohsiung	Individual
Asian Indoor Games
Gold medal – first place	2007 Macau	Individual
Bronze medal – third place	2009 Ho Chi Minh City	Individual

Mohammed Mustafa Shehab (born 11 December 1976) is a former professional snooker player from the United Arab Emirates.

The winner of the Snooker Singles at the 2007 Asian Indoor Games, Shehab has enjoyed good form in six-red snooker, most notably at the 2018 Six-red World Championship, where he reached the quarter-finals, defeating reigning World Champion Mark Williams in the last 16.

== Career ==
He competed as a professional on the main tour in the 1996–97 and 2006–07 seasons, finishing the latter with a ranking of 90th, the highest of his career.

Shehab regained the professional status recently in Q Tour Global Playoffs after defeating Hong Kong China’s Yu Kiu Chang 10-8 to earn a third spell on the World Snooker Tour.

=== Main tour ===
He entered nine tournaments, but his best performances came in the 1997 International Open and the European Open, where he reached the third qualifying round. Shehab had recorded his first professional win in the former, a 5–3 defeat of Englishman Rajan Sharma, but added only five more all season. Shebab would participate in the qualifying for both the 1996 UK Championship and the 1997 World Championship. His season's campaign culminated in a 1–5 loss to Iain Trimble in his second match. He finished the season ranked 397th and, with the addition of the secondary UK Tour, was immediately relegated from the main tour.

Shehab did not play again competitively for five years, until he entered the 2002 World Amateur Championship. There, he compensated for losses to Martin Gould and Alex Borg with victories over Habib Subah and seven others to progress from his group. He beat Supoj Saenla and Martin McCrudden to reach the quarter-finals, but lost 5–6 there to Steve Mifsud.

This led Shehab to enter several events on the Challenge Tour, which had replaced the UK Tour, during the 2003/2004 season; he lost in the semi-finals of one event to Stefan Mazrocis, but progressed no further after this. In Event Two, he defeated seventeen-year-old Mark Allen 4–3, but lost to Steve James in his next match. Shehab would also attempt to qualify for the world championship this season, but lose in the second round of qualifying to Lee Farebrother

Although he entered only one tournament in the following two seasons - losing 1–4 to Andrew Higginson in Event 1 of the 2004 Challenge Tour - Shehab won back his place on the main tour in 2006.

His second season as a professional brought no more success than his first, Shehab winning only four matches and earning only £500. He defeated Stuart Pettman, Liu Song and Borg in the 2006 Grand Prix, and Liu again in the Malta Cup, but lost his final four matches. Following a 6–10 loss to Mark Joyce in qualifying for the 2007 World Snooker Championship, Shehab finished the season ranked 90th, and was relegated once more from the tour.

=== Amateur career ===
Shehab would later win the Singles Snooker championship at the 2007 Asian Indoor Games. He defeated India's Yasin Merchant 4–2, Hong Kong's Chan Wai Ki 4–1, Thailand's Issara Kachaiwong 4–1, China's Xiao Guodong 4–3 before beating Thailand's James Wattana 4–3 in the final.

After playing as a wildcard entry in the 2009 Shanghai Masters, losing 3–5 to Graeme Dott, Shebab would contest the 2009 Six-red World Grand Prix, where he would come second in his group, defeating Joe Perry, and eventual winner Jimmy White, before defeating Nigel Bond in the first round. He would lose his second knockout round match to Judd Trump.

After 2009, Shehab continued to play at amateur level, entering the World Amateur Championship each year. His best performance came during the 2013 edition, when he reached the quarter-finals, where Lee Walker beat him 6–3. Shebab would make an appearance in the 2018 Six-red World Championship, where he would qualify from his group, thanks to wins over David Gilbert and Thanawat Tirapongpaiboon, and a 5–4 loss to Mark Selby. Shehab would draw world snooker champion Mark Williams in the last 16 knockout round. Shehab would win the match 6–3, and would play Sunny Akani in the Quarter-finals.

== Performance and rankings timeline ==
Tournament	1996/ 97	2003/ 04	2004/ 05	2006/ 07	2008/ 09	2009/ 10	2010/ 11	2016/ 17	2018/ 19	2019/ 20	2023/ 24	2024/ 25	2025/ 26
Ranking (Note: It shows the ranking at the beginning of the season)	(Note: New players don't have a ranking)	(Note: He was an amateur)											95
Ranking tournaments
Championship League	Tournament Not Held				Non-Ranking Event						A	A	A
Saudi Arabia Masters	Tournament Not Held											1R	2R
Wuhan Open	Tournament Not Held										A	LQ	A
English Open	Tournament Not Held							A	A	A	A	LQ	A
British Open	LQ	A	A	Tournament Not Held							A	LQ	A
Xi'an Grand Prix	Tournament Not Held											LQ	WD
Northern Ireland Open	Tournament Not Held							A	A	A	A	A	WD
International Championship	Tournament Not Held							A	A	A	A	A	A
UK Championship	LQ	A	A	LQ	A	A	A	A	A	A	A	LQ	WD
Shoot Out	Tournament Not Held						NR	A	A	A	A	A	WD
Scottish Open (Note: The event was called the International Open (1996/1997) and the Players Championship (2003/2004))	LQ	A	Tournament Not Held					A	A	A	A	A	A
German Masters (Note: The event was called the German Open (1996/1997))	A	Tournament Not Held					A	A	A	A	A	A	LQ
World Grand Prix	Tournament Not Held							DNQ	DNQ	DNQ	DNQ	DNQ	DNQ
Players Championship (Note: The event was called the Players Tour Championship Grand Final (2010/2011))	Tournament Not Held						DNQ	DNQ	DNQ	DNQ	DNQ	DNQ	DNQ
Welsh Open	LQ	A	A	LQ	A	A	A	A	A	A	A	A	LQ
World Open (Note: The event was called the Grand Prix (1996/1997, 2004/2005, 2006/2007, 2008/2009-2009/2010) and the LG Cup (2003/2004))	LQ	A	A	LQ	A	A	A	A	A	A	A	A	LQ
Tour Championship	Tournament Not Held								DNQ	DNQ	DNQ	DNQ	DNQ
World Championship	LQ	LQ	LQ	LQ	A	A	A	A	A	A	LQ	LQ	A
Non-ranking tournaments
The Masters	A	A	A	LQ	A	A	A	A	A	A	A	A	A
Former ranking tournaments
Asian Classic	LQ	Tournament Not Held											
Thailand Masters (Note: The event was called the Thailand Open (1996/1997))	LQ	Not Held		NR	Tournament Not Held								
Northern Ireland Trophy	Not Held			LQ	A	Tournament Not Held							
Shanghai Masters	Tournament Not Held				A	WR	A	A	Non-Ranking Event				
China Open	Not Held		A	LQ	A	A	A	A	A	Tournament Not Held			
European Masters (Note: The event was called the European Open (1996/1997, 2003/2004) and the Malta Cup (2004/2005, 2006/2007))	LQ	A	A	LQ	Not Held			A	A	A	A	Not Held	
Former non-ranking tournaments
Six-red World Championship (Note: The event was called the Six-red Snooker International (2008/2009) and the Six-red World Grand Prix (2009/2010))	Tournament Not Held				RR	3R	2R	RR	QF	RR	Not Held		

Performance Table Legend
LQ	lost in the qualifying draw	#R	lost in the early rounds of the tournament (WR = Wildcard round, RR = Round robin)	QF	lost in the quarter-finals
SF	lost in the semi-finals	F	lost in the final	W	won the tournament
DNQ	did not qualify for the tournament	A	did not participate in the tournament	WD	withdrew from the tournament

NH / Not Held	means an event was not held.
NR / Non-Ranking Event	means an event is/was no longer a ranking event.
R / Ranking Event	means an event is/was a ranking event.
MR / Minor-Ranking Event	means an event is/was a minor-ranking event.
PA / Pro-am Event	means an event is/was a pro-am event.

== Career finals ==
=== Pro-am finals: 1 (1 title) ===
Outcome	No.	Year	Championship	Opponent in the final	Score
Winner	1.	2007	Asian Indoor Games	(Thailand) James Wattana	4–3

=== Amateur finals: 7 (3 titles) ===
Outcome	No.	Year	Championship	Opponent in the final	Score
Winner	1.	2000	United Arab Emirates Amateur Championship	(Germany) Thomas Matthew	6–1
Runner-up	1.	2006	Asian Amateur Championship	(Thailand) Issara Kachaiwong	3–6
Runner-up	2.	2016	Asian Amateur Championship (2)	(Thailand) Kritsanut Lertsattayathorn	2–6
Runner-up	3.	2023	World Amateur Championship - Masters	(Bahrain) Habib Subah Humood	4–5
Runner-up	4.	2024	Q Tour Middle East – Event 2	(Iran) Amir Sarkhosh	3–4
Winner	2.	2024	Q Tour Middle East – Event 3	(Syria) Yazan Alhaddad	4–0
Winner	3.	2024	Q Tour Global Playoff - Event 3	(Hong Kong) Yu Kiu Chang	10–8
