= 2009 Six-red World Grand Prix =

Six-red World Grand Prix

Tournament information
- Dates: 7–12 July 2009
- Venue: Montien Riverside Hotel
- City: Bangkok
- Country: Thailand
- Organisation: ACBS
- Total prize fund: 3,720,000 baht
- Winner's share: 1,000,000 baht
- Highest break: 75 (x3)

Final
- Champion: (England) Jimmy White
- Runner-up: (England) Barry Hawkins
- Score: 8–6

The 2009 Six-red World Grand Prix (often styled the 2009 SangSom 6-red World Grand Prix for sponsorship and marketing purposes) was a six-red snooker tournament held between 7 and 12 July 2009 at the Montien Riverside Hotel in Bangkok, Thailand.

Twenty-three of the tournament's 48 competitors were on the 2009/10 professional World Snooker tour of the more established 15-red game. A relatively high proportion of competitors were from Asia.

Jimmy White won in the final 8–6 against Barry Hawkins.

== Prize money ==
The breakdown of prize money for this year is shown below:

- Winner: 1,000,000 baht
- Runner-up: 500,000 baht
- Semi-finalists: 250,000 baht
- Quarter-finalists: 150,000 baht
- Last 16: 70,000 baht
- Last 32: 35,000 baht
- Total: 3,720,000 baht

== Round-robin stage ==
The top four players from each group qualified for the knock-out stage. All matches were best of 9 frames.

=== Group A ===
POS	Player	MP	MW	FW	FL	FD	PTS
1	(England) Judd Trump	5	5	25	8	+17	5
2	(England) Ricky Walden	5	3	18	12	+6	3
3	(Thailand) Phaithoon Phonbun	5	3	21	18	+3	3
4	(Hong Kong) Fung Kwok Wai	5	2	19	18	+1	2
5	(United Arab Emirates) Mohammed Al-Joakar	5	1	9	21	−11	1
6	(Australia) Daniel Thorp	5	1	8	24	−16	1

- Fung Kwok Wai 4–5 Judd Trump
- Mohammed Al-Joakar 2–5 Phaithoon Phonbun
- Ricky Walden 5–1 Daniel Thorp
- Phaithoon Phonbun 2–5 Judd Trump
- Daniel Thorp 1–5 Fung Kwok Wai
- Daniel Thorp 0–5 Mohammed Al-Joakar
- Ricky Walden 5–1 Fung Kwok Wai
- Mohammed Al-Joakar 0–5 Judd Trump
- Fung Kwok Wai 4–5 Phaithoon Phonbun
- Ricky Walden 1–5 Judd Trump
- Daniel Thorp 5–4 Phaithoon Phonbun
- Ricky Walden 5–0 Mohammed Al-Joakar
- Ricky Walden 2–5 Phaithoon Phonbun
- Fung Kwok Wai 5–2 Mohammed Al-Joakar
- Daniel Thorp 1–5 Judd Trump

=== Group B ===
POS	Player	MP	MW	FW	FL	FD	PTS
1	(England) Shaun Murphy	5	4	21	14	+7	4
2	(Thailand) James Wattana	5	3	22	13	+9	3
3	(England) Nigel Bond	5	3	17	16	+1	3
4	(India) Aditya Mehta	5	2	16	20	−4	2
5	(Malta) Alex Borg	5	2	15	21	−6	2
6	(Myanmar) Akar Soe Yin	5	1	14	21	−7	1

- Alex Borg 5–2 Akar Soe Yin
- Aditya Mehta 5–4 James Wattana
- Alex Borg 2–5 Nigel Bond
- Shaun Murphy 5–3 Akar Soe Yin
- James Wattana 5–1 Nigel Bond
- Alex Borg 5–4 Aditya Mehta
- Akar Soe Yin 3–5 Nigel Bond
- Shaun Murphy 5–1 Aditya Mehta
- Shaun Murphy 5–3 James Wattana
- Shaun Murphy 5–2 Alex Borg
- Aditya Mehta 5–1 Nigel Bond
- Akar Soe Yin 1–5 James Wattana
- Shaun Murphy 1–5 Nigel Bond
- Aditya Mehta 1–5 Akar Soe Yin
- Alex Borg 1–5 James Wattana

=== Group C ===
POS	Player	MP	MW	FW	FL	FD	PTS
1	(Scotland) John Higgins	5	4	20	12	+8	4
2	(Wales) Matthew Stevens	5	4	21	15	+6	4
3	(Pakistan) Muhammad Sajjad	5	3	19	15	+4	3
4	(Thailand) Noppadon Noppachorn	5	2	20	21	−1	2
5	(Germany) Sascha Lippe	5	1	15	23	−8	1
6	(Bahrain) Habib Subah	5	1	13	22	−9	1

- Noppadon Noppachorn 4–5 Matthew Stevens
- John Higgins 0–5 Muhammad Sajjad
- Sascha Lippe 5–3 Habib Subah
- John Higgins 5–1 Matthew Stevens
- Muhammad Sajjad 5–4 Noppadon Noppachorn
- John Higgins 5–2 Noppadon Noppachorn
- Sascha Lippe 3–5 Matthew Stevens
- Habib Subah 5–2 Muhammad Sajjad
- Sascha Lippe 1–5 Muhammad Sajjad
- Habib Subah 1–5 Matthew Stevens
- Sascha Lippe 4–5 Noppadon Noppachorn
- Muhammad Sajjad 2–5 Matthew Stevens
- John Higgins 5–2 Habib Subah
- Habib Subah 2–5 Noppadon Noppachorn
- John Higgins 5–2 Sascha Lippe

=== Group D ===
POS	Player	MP	MW	FW	FL	FD	PTS
1	(Wales) Ryan Day	5	4	23	13	+10	4
2	(Republic of Ireland) Ken Doherty	5	4	24	16	+8	4
3	(England) Michael Holt	5	4	23	15	+8	4
4	(Thailand) Supoj Saenla	5	2	18	20	−2	2
5	(Singapore) Ang Bun Chin	5	1	13	21	−8	1
6	(Hong Kong) Au Chi Wai	5	0	9	25	−16	0

- Ryan Day 5–1 Au Chi Wai
- Ken Doherty 5–3 Supoj Saenla
- Ang Boon Chin 2–5 Michael Holt
- Ken Doherty 5–2 Au Chi Wai
- Ryan Day 3–5 Michael Holt
- Ang Boon Chin 3–5 Supoj Saenla
- Au Chi Wai 3–5 Michael Holt
- Ryan Day 5–4 Ken Doherty
- Au Chi Wai 1–5 Ang Boon Chin
- Supoj Saenla 2–5 Michael Holt
- Au Chi Wai 2–5 Supoj Saenla
- Ken Doherty 5–3 Michael Holt
- Ryan Day 5–0 Ang Boon Chin
- Ryan Day 5–3 Supoj Saenla
- Ken Doherty 5–3 Ang Boon Chin

=== Group E ===
POS	Player	MP	MW	FW	FL	FD	PTS
1	(Thailand) Issara Kachaiwong	5	5	25	10	+15	5
2	(United Arab Emirates) Mohammed Shehab	5	3	21	16	+5	3
3	(England) Joe Perry	5	3	21	17	+4	3
4	(England) Jimmy White	5	3	19	18	+1	3
5	(Northern Ireland) Joe Swail	5	1	17	20	−3	1
6	(Japan) Yutaka Fukada	5	0	3	25	−22	0

- Joe Perry 5–0 Yutaka Fukuda
- Issara Kachaiwong 5–3 Joe Swail
- Jimmy White 5–1 Yutaka Fukuda
- Joe Perry 5–4 Mohammed Shehab
- Jimmy White 1–5 Issara Kachaiwong
- Mohammed Shehab 5–1 Joe Swail
- Yutaka Fukuda 1–5 Issara Kachaiwong
- Joe Perry 3–5 Issara Kachaiwong
- Yutaka Fukuda 1–5 Mohammed Shehab
- Jimmy White 5–4 Joe Swail
- Yutaka Fukuda 0–5 Joe Swail
- Jimmy White 3–5 Mohammed Shehab
- Joe Perry 5–3 Joe Swail
- Mohammed Shehab 2–5 Issara Kachaiwong
- Joe Perry 3–5 Jimmy White

=== Group F ===
POS	Player	MP	MW	FW	FL	FD	PTS
1	(Wales) Darren Morgan	5	5	25	9	+16	5
2	(Thailand) Noppadol Sangnil	5	3	19	16	+3	3
3	(England) Stuart Bingham	5	2	15	17	−2	2
4	(England) Peter Ebdon	5	2	15	17	−2	2
5	(India) Manan Chandra	5	2	16	20	−4	2
6	(Pakistan) Raees Aslam	5	1	10	21	−11	1

- Darren Morgan 5–2 Noppadol Sangnil
- Peter Ebdon 5–0 Raees Aslam
- Manan Chandra 1–5 Stuart Bingham
- Darren Morgan 5–2 Stuart Bingham
- Manan Chandra 2–5 Noppadol Sangnil
- Raees Aslam 2–5 Noppadol Sangnil
- Peter Ebdon 1–5 Darren Morgan
- Manan Chandra 5–2 Raees Aslam
- Noppadol Sangnil 5–2 Stuart Bingham
- Peter Ebdon 1–5 Stuart Bingham
- Darren Morgan 5–3 Manan Chandra
- Peter Ebdon 3–5 Manan Chandra
- Raees Aslam 5–1 Stuart Bingham
- Peter Ebdon 5–2 Noppadol Sangnil
- Darren Morgan 5–1 Raees Aslam

=== Group G ===
POS	Player	MP	MW	FW	FL	FD	PTS
1	(Wales) Mark Williams	5	4	22	6	+16	4
2	(Thailand) Thepchaiya Un-Nooh	5	4	20	14	+6	4
3	(England) Dave Harold	5	3	18	13	+5	3
4	(Egypt) Wael Talat	5	2	16	16	0	2
5	(Qatar) Mohsen Abdul Aziz	5	1	10	23	−13	1
6	(Australia) Glen Wilkinson	5	1	10	24	−14	1

- Mark Williams 2–5 Dave Harold
- Glen Wilkinson 5–4 Wael Talat
- Mohsen Abdul Aziz 3–5 Thepchaiya Un-nooh
- Mark Williams 5–0 Wael Talat
- Glen Wilkinson 0–5 Dave Harold
- Glen Wilkinson 3–5 Mohsen Abdul Aziz
- Wael Talat 2–5 Thepchaiya Un-nooh
- Wael Talat 5–1 Dave Harold
- Mark Williams 5–1 Mohsen Abdul Aziz
- Glen Wilkinson 2–5 Thepchaiya Un-nooh
- Mohsen Abdul Aziz 1–5 Dave Harold
- Thepchaiya Un-nooh 5–2 Dave Harold
- Mark Williams 5–0 Glen Wilkinson
- Wael Talat 5–0 Mohsen Abdul Aziz
- Mark Williams 5–0 Thepchaiya Un-nooh

=== Group H ===
POS	Player	MP	MW	FW	FL	FD	PTS
1	(England) Mark King	5	5	25	7	+18	5
2	(England) Barry Hawkins	5	4	23	12	+11	4
3	(Republic of Ireland) Brendan O'Donoghue	5	3	17	12	+5	3
4	(Thailand) Atthasit Mahitthi	5	2	17	16	+1	2
5	(Egypt) Mohammed Kayat	5	1	8	21	−13	1
6	(Vietnam) Nguyen Nhat Thank	5	0	3	25	−22	0

- Mohammed Kayat 5–1 Nguyen Nhat Thanh
- Mark King 5–2 Atthasit Mahitthi
- Brendan O’Donnoghue 1–5 Barry Hawkins
- Atthasit Mahitthi 4–5 Barry Hawkins
- Brendan O’Donnoghue 5–0 Nguyen Nhat Thanh
- Brendan O’Donnoghue 5–1 Atthasit Mahitthi
- Nguyen Nhat Thanh 1–5 Barry Hawkins
- Mark King 5–1 Mohammed Kayat
- Mohammed Kayat 0–5 Atthasit Mahitthi
- Mark King 5–1 Brendan O’Donnoghue
- Mark King 5–0 Nguyen Nhat Thanh
- Brendan O’Donnoghue 5–1 Mohammed Kayat
- Mark King 5–3 Barry Hawkins
- Nguyen Nhat Thanh 1–5 Atthasit Mahitthi
- Mohammed Kayat 1–5 Barry Hawkins

== Knockout stage ==
Last 32; Best of 11 frames
(England) Mark King	6
(Egypt) Wael Talat	1
(England) Michael Holt	6
(Thailand) Noppadol Sangnil	3
(England) Ricky Walden	6
(Pakistan) Muhammad Sajjad	3
(England) Jimmy White	6
(England) Shaun Murphy	4
(Wales) Mark Williams	6
(Thailand) Atthasit Mahitthi	2
(Thailand) Phaithoon Phonbun	4
(Republic of Ireland) Ken Doherty	6
(Wales) Matthew Stevens	1
(England) Stuart Bingham	6
(India) Aditya Mehta	4
(Thailand) Issara Kachaiwong	6
(Wales) Darren Morgan	4
(Thailand) Noppadon Noppachorn	6
(England) Dave Harold	5
(England) Barry Hawkins	6
(England) Joe Perry	3
(Thailand) James Wattana	6
(Hong Kong) Fung Kwok Wai	1
(Wales) Ryan Day	6
(Scotland) John Higgins	6
(Thailand) Supoj Saenla	4
(Republic of Ireland) Brendan O'Donoghue	4
(Thailand) Thepchaiya Un-Nooh	6
(United Arab Emirates) Mohammed Shehab	6
(England) Nigel Bond	4
(England) Peter Ebdon	1
(England) Judd Trump	6

Last 16; Best of 11 frames
(England) Mark King	6
(England) Michael Holt	2
(England) Ricky Walden	5
(England) Jimmy White	6
(Wales) Mark Williams	6
(Republic of Ireland) Ken Doherty	0
(England) Stuart Bingham	5
(Thailand) Issara Kachaiwong	6
(Thailand) Noppadon Noppachorn	4
(England) Barry Hawkins	6
(Thailand) James Wattana	6
(Wales) Ryan Day	4
(Scotland) John Higgins	6
(Thailand) Thepchaiya Un-Nooh	0
(United Arab Emirates) Mohammed Shehab	4
(England) Judd Trump	6

Quarter-finals; Best of 13 frames
(England) Mark King	6
(England) Jimmy White	7
(Wales) Mark Williams	7
(Thailand) Issara Kachaiwong	5
(England) Barry Hawkins	7
(Thailand) James Wattana	5
(Scotland) John Higgins	2
(England) Judd Trump	7

Semi-finals; Best of 13 frames
(England) Jimmy White	7
(Wales) Mark Williams	4
(England) Barry Hawkins	7
(England) Judd Trump	2

Final; Best of 15 frames
(England) Jimmy White	8
(England) Barry Hawkins	6

== Maximum breaks ==
(Note a maximum break in six-red snooker is 75)

- Michael Holt
- Ryan Day
- Jimmy White
