= Lao khao =

Thai distilled spirit

Sura khao
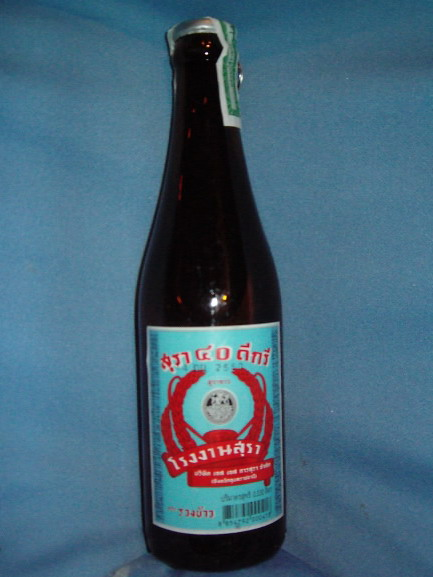
- A bottle of Lao khao
- Origin: Thailand
- Alcohol by volume: 28%–40%
- Colour: Clear
- Ingredients: Molasses, rice, jasmine rice, glutinous rice, maize, sugar cane juice, adlay, sorghum bicolor, etc.

Lao khao (Thai: เหล้าขาว, pronounced [lâw kʰǎːw]; lit. 'white spirit' (Note: Not to be confused with the English term white spirit.)) or officially sura khao (Thai: สุราขาว, [sùʔ.rāː kʰǎːw]) is a Thai distilled spirit.

== History ==
The production of these spirits in Thailand is long-attested by foreign sources. According to the Chinese source “Yingya Shenglan” (1405–1433), the Ayutthaya Kingdom, called Xiānluó (暹羅) (Note: Xiānluó was the Chinese name for Ayutthaya, a kingdom created by the merger of Lavo and Sukhothai or Suphannabhumi) by the Chinese, had two kinds of spirits, both of which are distilled spirits. The French diplomat Simon de la Loubère, who visited Siam during the mid-Ayutthaya period, wrote about Siamese spirits:

“But as in hot Countries the continual dissipation of the Spirits, makes them desire what encreases them, they passionately esteem Aqua Vitae, and the strongest more than the others. The Siameses do make it of Rice, and do frequently rack it with Lime. Of Rice they do at first make Beer, which they drink not; but they convert it into Aqua Vitae which they call Laou, and the Portuguese Arak, an Arabian word, which properly signifies sweat, and metaphorically essence, and by way of excellence Aqua Vitae. Of the Rice Beer they likewise make Vinegar.”

In 1790, during the reign of King Rama I, Bangyikhan Liquor Distillery was known to have been established. At this time, spirits that made at the government distillery were called lao rong, (Thai: เหล้าโรง). and the private distilleries that existed everywhere were declared illegal. In 1834, English sources mention that exports of Siam included white spirits distilled from glutinous rice. The name lao khao came into existence when lao si (Thai: เหล้าสี, lit. 'coloured spirits'), including Mekhong, were made after World War II.

Distilling lao khao in Thailand must be licensed, under the Criminal Activities Act which was introduced in the 1950s. This regulation was passed after a spate of lao khao of poor quality being produced, which resulted in methanol related poisoning. The methanol was produced as a by-product of the spirits reacting with tin and aluminium stills used. The metals were switched out with stainless steel when the government took over all distilleries by 1960. The distilleries were then returned to civilian control as the government could not operate all of them. By 1984, only twelve distilleries were left. ThaiBev then took control of these twelve distilleries in 1985, forming a monopoly. In 2003, Thaksin Shinawatra fulfilled an election promise made during the 2001 Thai general election to let people produce the spirits with licenses, thus breaking the monopoly. However, licenses are hard to come by.

Most modern lao khao is distilled from molasses instead of rice to reduce production costs.

== See also ==
- Thai wine
- Mekhong
- Sang Som
- Awamori
- Sato
- List of rice beverages
