= Six-ball (disambiguation) =

Six-ball, sixball, 6 ball, or 6-ball may refer to:

- 6 ball, the pool (pocket billiards) ball numbered "6" and colored green
- 6 ball, the pink snooker ball, worth 6 points, normally referred to as "the pink"
- Six-ball, a pocket billiards (pool) game, played with six object balls, of which the 6 ball is the game-winning ball; it is a shortened form of nine-ball
- Six-red snooker, a shortened form of standard (15-red) snooker; sometimes incorrectly referred to as six-ball snooker
- 6-ball, a six-dimensional n-ball in mathematics
