= 2018 Six-red World Championship =

Six-red World Championship
Tournament information
- Dates: 3–8 September 2018
- Venue: Bangkok Convention Center
- City: Bangkok
- Country: Thailand
- Organisation: WPBSA
- Total prize fund: 10,000,000 baht
- Winner's share: 3,500,000 baht
- Highest break: (England) Stuart Bingham (75) (China) Ding Junhui (75) (Note: A maximum break in six-red snooker is 75)

Final
- Champion: (England) Kyren Wilson
- Runner-up: (China) Ding Junhui
- Score: 8–4

The 2018 SangSom Six-red World Championship was a six-red snooker invitational tournament held between 3 and 8 September 2018 at the Bangkok Convention Center in Bangkok, Thailand.

Mark Williams was the defending champion, but he lost in the last 16 to amateur player Mohammed Shehab.

The event was won by Kyren Wilson, defeating Ding Junhui 8–4 in the final.

== Prize money ==
The breakdown of prize money is shown below:

- Winner: 3,500,000 baht
- Runner-up: 1,300,000 baht
- Semi-finalists: 750,000 baht
- Quarter-finalists: 375,000 baht
- Last 16: 150,000 baht
- Third in Group: 75,000 baht
- Fourth in Group: 50,000 baht
- Total: 10,000,000 baht

== Round-robin stage ==
Group matches were played from 3–5 September. The top two players from each group qualified for the knock-out stage. All matches were the best of 9 frames.

Positions within the group were decided by the number of matches won (MW) and then, in the event of a tie, by the frame difference (FD). Where two players were still tied, the result of the match between them determined their positions. Where three players were still tied, the top position was determined by a draw and the other two positions by the result of the match between those two players.

=== Group A ===
POS	Player	MP	MW	ML	FW	FL	FD
1	(Wales) Mark Williams	3	3	0	15	7	+8
2	(England) Tom Ford	3	2	1	14	10	+4
3	(England) Ricky Walden	3	1	2	11	14	−3
4	(Thailand) Thepchaiya Un-Nooh	3	0	3	6	15	−9

- Mark Williams 5–1 Thepchaiya Un-Nooh
- Tom Ford 5–4 Ricky Walden
- Thepchaiya Un-Nooh 4–5 Ricky Walden
- Mark Williams 5–4 Tom Ford
- Mark Williams 5–2 Ricky Walden
- Thepchaiya Un-Nooh 1–5 Tom Ford

=== Group B ===
POS	Player	MP	MW	ML	FW	FL	FD
1	(Scotland) Stephen Maguire	3	3	0	15	6	+9
2	(Wales) Ryan Day	3	2	1	13	8	+5
3	(China) Luo Honghao	3	1	2	9	11	−2
4	(Thailand) Nutcharut Wongharuthai	3	0	3	3	15	−12

- Ryan Day 5–1 Nutcharut Wongharuthai
- Luo Honghao 2–5 Stephen Maguire
- Nutcharut Wongharuthai 1–5 Stephen Maguire
- Ryan Day 5–2 Luo Honghao
- Nutcharut Wongharuthai 1–5 Luo Honghao
- Ryan Day 3–5 Stephen Maguire

=== Group C ===
POS	Player	MP	MW	ML	FW	FL	FD
1	(England) Stuart Bingham	3	3	0	15	6	+9
2	(Thailand) James Wattana	3	2	1	13	10	+3
3	(England) Mark King	3	1	2	10	10	0
4	(Israel) Shachar Ruberg	3	0	3	3	15	−12

- Stuart Bingham 5–3 James Wattana
- Shachar Ruberg 0–5 Mark King
- James Wattana 5–3 Mark King
- Stuart Bingham 5–1 Shachar Ruberg
- Stuart Bingham 5–2 Mark King
- James Wattana 5–2 Shachar Ruberg

=== Group D ===
POS	Player	MP	MW	ML	FW	FL	FD
1	(England) Kyren Wilson	3	3	0	15	5	+10
2	(Scotland) Graeme Dott	3	2	1	11	6	+5
3	(Singapore) Marvin Lim Chun Kiat	3	1	2	6	10	−4
4	(Wales) Michael White	3	0	3	4	15	−11

- Michael White 0–5 Graeme Dott
- Kyren Wilson 5–0 Marvin Lim Chun Kiat
- Kyren Wilson 5–4 Michael White
- Marvin Lim Chun Kiat 1–5 Graeme Dott
- Kyren Wilson 5–1 Graeme Dott
- Michael White 0–5 Marvin Lim Chun Kiat

=== Group E ===
POS	Player	MP	MW	ML	FW	FL	FD
1	(China) Ding Junhui	3	3	0	15	10	+5
2	(Thailand) Sunny Akani	3	2	1	14	10	+4
3	(England) Jimmy Robertson	3	1	2	12	11	+1
4	(Egypt) Mohamed Khairy	3	0	3	5	15	−10

- Sunny Akani 5–4 Jimmy Robertson
- Ding Junhui 5–3 Mohamed Khairy
- Ding Junhui 5–4 Sunny Akani
- Mohamed Khairy 1–5 Jimmy Robertson
- Ding Junhui 5–3 Jimmy Robertson
- Sunny Akani 5–1 Mohamed Khairy

=== Group F ===
POS	Player	MP	MW	ML	FW	FL	FD
1	(China) Zhou Yuelong	3	2	1	13	11	+2
2	(Scotland) Anthony McGill	3	2	1	13	12	+1
3	(England) Joe Perry	3	1	2	12	13	−1
4	(England) Michael Holt	3	1	2	11	13	−2

- Michael Holt 5–3 Joe Perry
- Anthony McGill 5–3 Zhou Yuelong
- Anthony McGill 5–4 Michael Holt
- Zhou Yuelong 5–4 Joe Perry
- Anthony McGill 3–5 Joe Perry
- Michael Holt 2–5 Zhou Yuelong

=== Group G ===
POS	Player	MP	MW	ML	FW	FL	FD
1	(Belgium) Luca Brecel	3	2	1	14	8	+6
2	(Hong Kong) Marco Fu	3	2	1	14	12	+2
3	(Thailand) Noppon Saengkham	3	2	1	11	11	0
4	(Australia) Kurt Dunham	3	0	3	7	15	−8

- Noppon Saengkham 5–4 Marco Fu
- Luca Brecel 5–2 Kurt Dunham
- Luca Brecel 4–5 Marco Fu
- Noppon Saengkham 5–2 Kurt Dunham
- Luca Brecel 5–1 Noppon Saengkham
- Kurt Dunham 3–5 Marco Fu

=== Group H ===
POS	Player	MP	MW	ML	FW	FL	FD
1	(England) Mark Selby	3	3	0	15	7	+8
2	(United Arab Emirates) Mohammed Shehab	3	2	1	14	13	+1
3	(England) David Gilbert	3	1	2	10	13	−3
4	(Thailand) Thanawat Tirapongpaiboon	3	0	3	9	15	−6

- Thanawat Tirapongpaiboon 3–5 David Gilbert
- Mark Selby 5–4 Mohammed Shehab
- Mark Selby 5–1 David Gilbert
- Thanawat Tirapongpaiboon 4–5 Mohammed Shehab
- Mark Selby 5–2 Thanawat Tirapongpaiboon
- Mohammed Shehab 5–4 David Gilbert

== Knockout stage ==
The last 16 matches and quarter-finals were played on 6 September, the semi-finals on 7 September and the final on 8 September.

Last 16; Best of 11 frames
(Wales) Mark Williams	3
(United Arab Emirates) Mohammed Shehab	6
(Scotland) Stephen Maguire	5
(Thailand) Sunny Akani	6
(England) Stuart Bingham	6
(Hong Kong) Marco Fu	2
(England) Kyren Wilson	6
(Scotland) Anthony McGill	3
(China) Ding Junhui	6
(Scotland) Graeme Dott	3
(China) Zhou Yuelong	5
(Thailand) James Wattana	6
(Belgium) Luca Brecel	6
(Wales) Ryan Day	3
(England) Mark Selby	5
(England) Tom Ford	6

Quarter-finals; Best of 11 frames
(United Arab Emirates) Mohammed Shehab	5
(Thailand) Sunny Akani	6
(England) Stuart Bingham	4
(England) Kyren Wilson	6
(China) Ding Junhui	6
(Thailand) James Wattana	2
(Belgium) Luca Brecel	6
(England) Tom Ford	3

Semi-finals; Best of 13 frames
(Thailand) Sunny Akani	5
(England) Kyren Wilson	7
(China) Ding Junhui	7
(Belgium) Luca Brecel	6

Final; Best of 15 frames
(England) Kyren Wilson	8
(China) Ding Junhui	4

== Final ==
Final: Best of 15 frames. Referee: Peggy Li; Bangkok Convention Center, Bangkok, Thailand, 8 September 2018.
Kyren Wilson; England	8–4	Ding Junhui; China
35–18, 23–39, 1–35, 37–25, 39–0, 55–6 (55), 67–0 (67), 32–17, 24–30, 0–57, 40–0, 45–5
67	Highest break	31
2	50+ breaks	0

== Maximum breaks ==
(Note: A maximum break in 6-red is 75)

- Stuart Bingham
- Ding Junhui
