= Thepchaiya Un-Nooh =

Thai snooker player (born 1985)

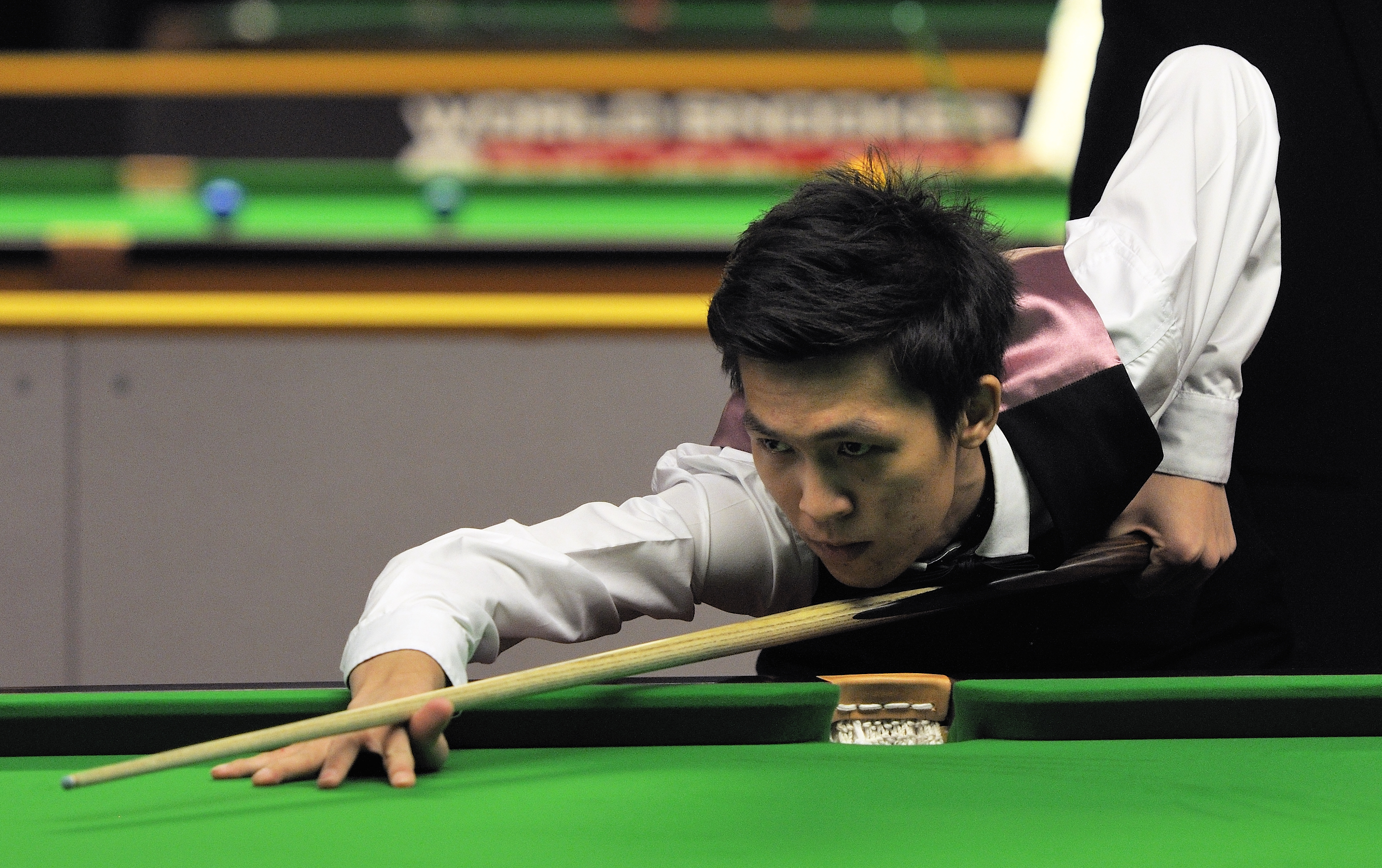
- Un-Nooh at the 2014 German Masters

Personal information
- Nickname: F1
- Born: 18 April 1985 (age 41) Nakhon Nayok, Thailand

Sport
- Country: Thailand
- Sport: Snooker
- Professional: 2009/2010, 2012–present
- Highest ranking: 15 (October 2020)
- Current ranking: 22 (as of 7 November 2026)
- Maximum breaks: 8
- Century breaks: 228 (as of 19 November 2026)

Tournament wins
- Ranking: 2
Medal record
Men's snooker
Representing Thailand
Asian Games
Bronze medal – third place	2010 Guangzhou	Team
Southeast Asian Games
Gold medal – first place	2011 Palembang	6-red singles
Silver medal – second place	2007 Nakhon Ratchasima	Singles

Thepchaiya Un-Nooh (Thai: เทพไชยา อุ่นหนู, RTGS: Thepchaiya Unnu; born 18 April 1985) is a Thai professional snooker player.

He has won two ranking events, the 2019 Snooker Shoot Out and the 2026 World Open, and finished as runner-up in the 2019 World Open. He is regarded as one of the fastest snooker players on the World Tour, averaging less than 17 seconds per shot during the 2017–18 and the 2019–20 snooker seasons.. He won his second ranking title at the 2026 World Open, where he defeated Ronnie O'Sullivan 10–7 in the final, and made his seventh career maximum break of 147 during the match.

== Career ==
Un-Nooh began his first year on the professional tour for the 2009–10 season by winning the 2008 IBSF World Snooker Championship. He dropped off the main tour after just one season.

=== 2012–13 season ===
He received the Thai nomination to compete on the snooker tour for the 2012–13 season. As a new player on the tour, he needed to win four matches to reach the main stage of the ranking events. He lost in the third qualifying round in three of the first four ranking events of the season. In September, it was announced that his match at the Players Tour Championship – Event 3 against Steve Davis was under investigation due to unusual betting patterns. Un-Nooh moved from an 8/11 odds-on favourite to 11/8 against just before the match started, and went on to lose 0–4. World Snooker released a statement in November to confirm that there was insufficient evidence, and that no further action would be taken against Un-Nooh. He reached the final qualifying round for the UK Championship and the World Open, but lost to Michael Holt and Ryan Day respectively. Un-Nooh played in nine of the ten Players Tour Championship Events during the season; his best results were three last-16 defeats in European Tour Events, and he finished 46th on the PTC Order of Merit. His season ended when he was beaten 3–10 by Ben Woollaston in the third round of World Championship Qualifying, which saw him finish the year ranked world number 69.

=== 2013–14 season ===
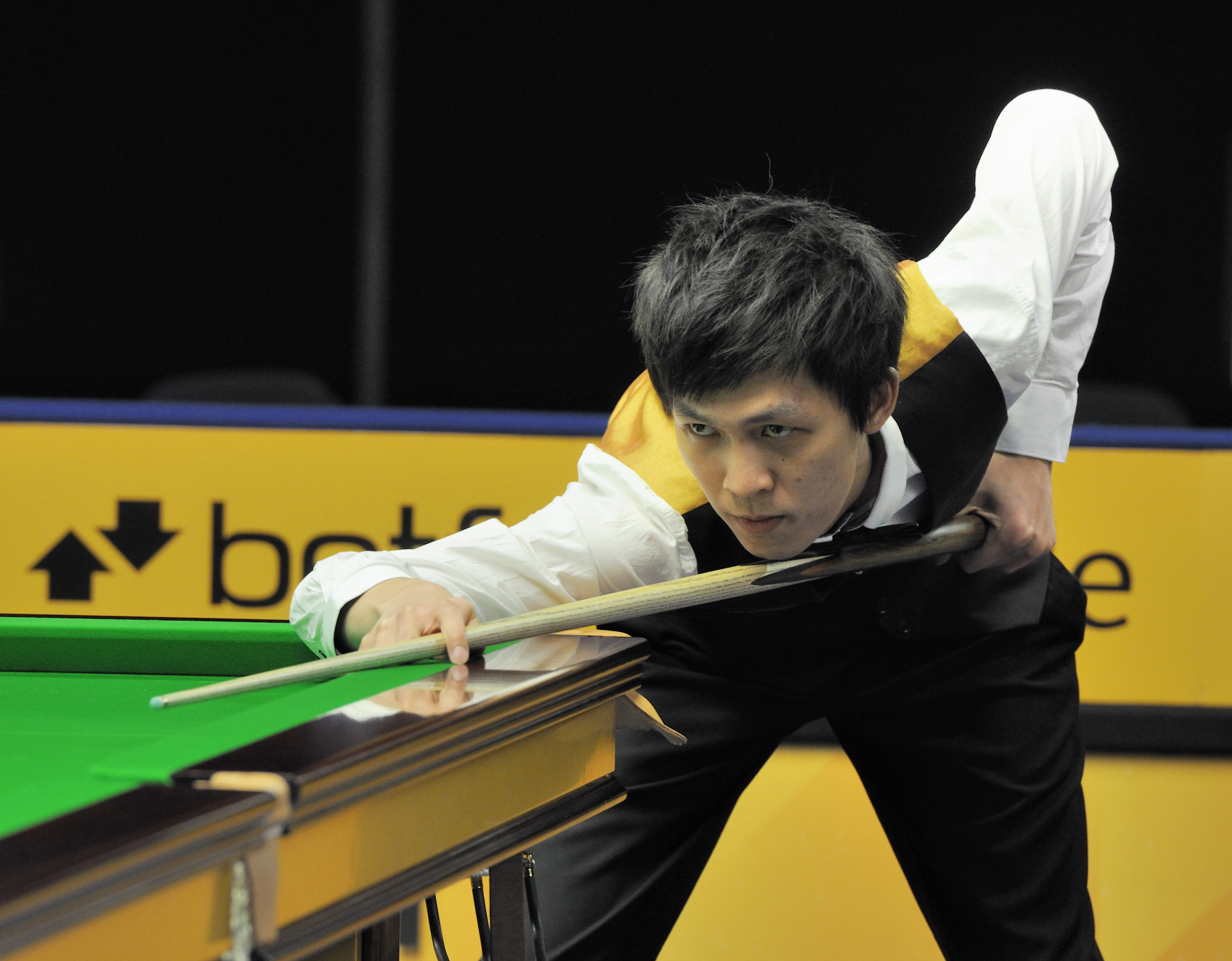
Un-Nooh in 2013

Un-Nooh lost in the qualifying rounds for the first four ranking events of the 2013–14 season, but then beat Gerard Greene 6–5 to reach the International Championship in Chengdu, China. In his first appearance in the main draw of a ranking event he defeated Zhang Anda 6–1, before losing by the same scoreline to Neil Robertson in the last 32. Un-Nooh played at the venue stage of four of the remaining six ranking events. He beat Ronnie O'Sullivan 5–4 in qualifying for the German Masters, with the reigning world champion playing high risk exhibition shots throughout the match, but Un-Nooh was whitewashed 5–0 by Jack Lisowski in the first round. At the World Open, Un-Nooh led Stephen Maguire 3–0, before the world number eight rallied to win four frames in a row. The match went into a deciding frame in which Un-Nooh made a break of sixty, only for Maguire to get a chance to win but then miss the final brown. He then reached the last 16 of a ranking event for the first time by beating Andrew Higginson 5–1 and lost 5–2 to Graeme Dott. Un-Nooh missed the final pink when on a 147 break during the match. Un-Nooh advanced to the last 32 of the China Open by whitewashing Ken Doherty 5–0, before losing 5–3 against Ding Junhui. His performances during the campaign saw him end it in the top 64 in the world rankings for the first time as he was placed 59th.

=== 2014–15 season ===
Un-Nooh qualified for the International Championship for the second year in a row, but was edged out 6–5 by Fergal O'Brien in the first round. He also lost in a deciding frame in the first round of the UK Championship against Robin Hull, making breaks of 137 and 117 during the match. Un-Nooh won five games to reach the semi-finals of the Xuzhou Open where he beat Mark Williams 4–1 to play in his first final in a professional event. He was defeated 4–1 by Joe Perry, but he described Un-Nooh as an exceptional talent after the match.

Un-Nooh defeated defending champion Ding in the first round of the Indian Open, calling it his biggest win after the match. He also stated that he didn't feel he could win the title. He then whitewashed Luca Brecel 4–0 and then recorded wins over Jamie Jones and Mark Davis to reach the semi-finals of a ranking event for the first time. Un-Nooh compiled a trio of half-century breaks to race into a 3–0 lead over Ricky Walden, but went on to lose 4–3. His Asian final saw him finish fourth on their Order of Merit to make his debut in the Grand Final, where he was knocked out 4–1 by Mark Williams in the first round. Un-Nooh's rise up the rankings continued as he ended the year 49th in the world.

=== 2015–16 season ===
Un-Nooh scored his first professional win at the 2015 Six-red World Championship in Bangkok, Thailand. He beat world champion Stuart Bingham and Judd Trump en route to a final with Liang Wenbo, which he won 8–2 in frames. Un-Nooh missed the final black in attempting to make a maximum break in his 6–2 loss to Neil Robertson at the UK Championship. He appeared on Channel 4 show TFI Friday a few days later to recreate the shot, and this time potted it. At the World Grand Prix, Un-Nooh eliminated Marco Fu 4–3 and Mark Allen 4–2 to reach the quarter-finals. He made breaks of 97, 84 and 74 to lead 3–1, but Ding took the match 4–3. Incredibly, in the final round of World Championship qualifying, Un-Nooh missed another 147 final black. He did make a 144 later on in the match, but his opponent Anthony McGill won 10–7. Un Nooh increased his ranking by 16 places over the year to end it as the world number 33.

=== 2016–17 season ===
Un-Nooh knocked out world number one Mark Selby 5–3 in the second round of the World Open, and then whitewashed Alan McManus 5–0 and beat Anthony McGill 5–2. In the semi-finals he suffered a 6–1 loss to Ali Carter. In the third round of the Paul Hunter Classic against Kurt Maflin, Un-Nooh finally made his first professional 147 break, after twice missing the final black the previous season. It earned him £40,000, and he won the match 4–1 before then narrowly beating Mark Allen and David Grace both 4–3, to reach the semi-finals of a ranking tournament for the second successive event. Un-Nooh lost 4–2 against Tom Ford. He then failed to win a first-round match until the 2017 Welsh Open, in which he beat Ben Woollaston 4–0 and then saw off Ryan Day 4–1, before being defeated 4–1 by Barry Hawkins. After a last 16 finish at the Gibraltar Open his season ended on a low note as he lost in the first round of qualifying for the World Championship with a 10–9 defeat against Peter Lines.

=== 2017–18 season ===
At the invitational 2017 Six-red World Championship, Un-Nooh reached the final and was level at 2–2 against Williams before losing 2–8. His best ranking finish for the season was reaching the last 16 at the World Open, where he was eliminated 5–1 by Kyren Wilson. He qualified for the World Championship for the second year running after recording victories over Alexander Ursenbacher (10–8), Adam Stefanow (10–4), and Alfie Burden (10–8). Drawn against John Higgins in the first round, he recorded two century breaks but ultimately lost out 10–7. He finished the season ranked 56th.

=== 2018–19 season: first ranking title ===
Un-Nooh's best showing in a ranking event for the first half of the 2018–19 snooker season was at the Northern Ireland Open, where he defeated Robert Milkins 4–0, Ross Muir 4–0, Chris Totten 4–1, and Robbie Williams 4–0 before meeting Mark Selby in the quarter-finals where he lost 5–3. Un-Nooh then secured his first ranking event title at the 2019 Snooker Shoot Out, beating Michael Holt with a break of 74. This came after he made the highest break in the tournament's history, 139, in the semi-finals to beat Jamie Clarke. He secured a £32,000 prize and became the second player from Thailand to win a ranking event. He qualified for the World Championship, recording victories over Johnathan Bagley, Mark Joyce and Joe O'Connor. He was drawn against Trump in the first round, and lost 10–9, having been 6–3 up and having a chance to win in the deciding frame.

=== 2019–20 season ===
In the first half of the 2019–20 snooker season, Un-Nooh's best performances in ranking events were last 16 finishes at the Riga Masters and English Open, where he was defeated by Kurt Maflin and Ricky Walden respectively. He also added another title by winning the non-ranking Haining Open, defeating Li Hang 5–3 in the final. Just one week later at the World Open, Un-Nooh recorded victories over Zhang Yang, Craig Steadman, Sunny Akani, David Gilbert and Kyren Wilson to reach his second ranking final. Facing Trump, he fell 7–1 behind including conceding a frame after three fouls, but rallied to 8–5 before Trump took the remaining two frames. He picked up £75,000 for reaching the final which is his highest single-event prize to date. He also reached the quarter-finals of the Scottish Open where he lost out 5–3 to Jack Lisowski, the European Masters where he lost 5–1 to Neil Robertson, and the Gibraltar Open where he lost 4–0 to Kyren Wilson. For the 2020 World Snooker Championship delayed by the COVID-19 pandemic, he came through qualifying for the third year in a row with victories over Dominic Dale and Liam Highfield, and was drawn against O'Sullivan in the first round. In a match played behind closed doors, he was defeated 10–1 in a fastest ever best-of-19 match at the Crucible, which lasted 108 minutes.

=== 2020–21 season ===
In a season largely played behind closed doors in Milton Keynes, Un-Nooh's best ranking finishes were last 16 appearances at the Northern Ireland Open, Shoot Out and Gibraltar Open. His performances from the previous season were enough to propel him into the top 16 in the rankings for the first time by October, and would ensure he would make a first appearance at the Masters. Drawn against reigning champion Bingham, he slipped to 5–1 behind but rallied to 5–4, before Bingham won the tenth frame and the match 6–4. His season ended with a 6–5 defeat to Igor Figueiredo in the first round of qualifying for the World Championship.

=== 2021–22 season ===
Starting the season ranked 19th, Un-Nooh endured a poor run of form through most of the 2021–22 snooker season, with his best showing by March being a last 32 appearance at the English Open. Despite losing to Fan Zhengyi in qualifying for the German Masters, he made the third maximum break of his career during the match. At the Turkish Masters, he was under pressure for ranking points and defeated local wildcard Ismail Turker, Stephen Maguire and Jordan Brown before losing in the last 16 to Matthew Selt but gaining some much needed points. He then entered qualifying for the World Championship with relegation from the tour a possibility. He defeated Andrew Pagett (6–4), Jak Jones (6–5), and recorded a first ever victory over Selt (10–7) to save his tour card and advance to the Crucible. Un-Nooh lost to Higgins 10–7 in the first round proper.

=== 2022–23 season ===
Un-Nooh's best ranking performance of the 2022–23 season came in the Scottish Open where he reached the semi-finals, recording victories against Mark Allen and Judd Trump before losing to Gary Wilson. His only other notable performance of the season came in the Six-red World Championship where he reached the final, losing 8–6 to Ding Junhui. He made the fourth maximum break of his career at the WST Classic against Xu Si.

=== 2023–24 season ===
In the 2023–24 season, his best ranking performances were reaching the last 16 of the International Championship, where he lost 6–5 to Barry Hawkins, and the German Masters, where he lost 5–2 to Judd Trump.

=== 2024–25 season ===
He also did not progress past the last 16 during the 2024–25 season, which he reached at the British Open, losing 4–3 to Mark Selby.

=== 2025–26 season: second ranking title ===
At the 2026 World Open, Un-Nooh defeated Trump in the semi-finals to set up a meeting with O'Sullivan. In the final, Un-Nooh fell 0‍–‍4 behind before winning six consecutive frames. O'Sullivan won the next three but Un-Nooh secured a 10‍–‍7 victory after making breaks of 132, 147 (maximum break) and 131 in the final three frames.

== Playing style ==
Un-Nooh is noted for his rapid playing style, and ability to win frames and matches quickly with explosive speed and heavy scoring, while his playing style has varyingly been described as "scary", but also "frustrating" due to his over-emphasis on attacking play which can make him vulnerable in safety exchanges or scrappy frames.

He is also notably only the second player (after Jamie Cope) to achieve a 155 break in a witnessed frame and the first to achieve it on camera after compiling one during a practice match against Hossein Vafaei.

== Performance and rankings timeline ==
Tournament	2008/ 09	2009/ 10	2010/ 11	2012/ 13	2013/ 14	2014/ 15	2015/ 16	2016/ 17	2017/ 18	2018/ 19	2019/ 20	2020/ 21	2021/ 22	2022/ 23	2023/ 24	2024/ 25	2025/ 26	2026/ 27
Ranking (Note: It shows the ranking at the beginning of the season)	(Note: He was an amateur)	(Note: New players on the Main Tour don't have a ranking)			69	59	49	33	42	56	37	20	19	52	38	43	46	18
Ranking tournaments
Championship League	Non-Ranking Event											2R	RR	RR	2R	2R	2R	RR
China Open	A	LQ	A	LQ	2R	LQ	LQ	LQ	1R	LQ	Tournament Not Held							LQ
Wuhan Open	Tournament Not Held														1R	LQ	3R	LQ
British Open	Tournament Not Held												1R	1R	1R	3R	LQ	LQ
English Open	Tournament Not Held							1R	2R	3R	4R	2R	2R	3R	LQ	1R	1R	1R
Shenzhen Open (Note: The event was called the Xi'an Grand Prix (2024/2025–2025/2026))	Tournament Not Held															2R	2R	1R
Northern Ireland Open	Tournament Not Held							1R	3R	QF	3R	4R	LQ	1R	A	1R	3R	2R
International Championship	Not Held			LQ	2R	1R	SF	LQ	LQ	1R	1R	Not Held			3R	2R	2R	2R
UK Championship	A	LQ	A	LQ	1R	1R	3R	1R	2R	2R	2R	2R	2R	LQ	1R	LQ	LQ	
Shoot Out	Not Held		Non-Ranking Event					2R	A	W	2R	4R	1R	2R	3R	2R	1R	
Scottish Open	Not Held			MR	Not Held			1R	1R	1R	QF	2R	LQ	SF	1R	LQ	3R	
German Masters	Not Held		A	LQ	1R	LQ	LQ	1R	1R	LQ	LQ	LQ	LQ	LQ	3R	2R	LQ	LQ
Welsh Open	A	LQ	A	LQ	2R	2R	2R	3R	2R	2R	1R	1R	1R	LQ	LQ	LQ	LQ	
World Grand Prix	Tournament Not Held					NR	QF	DNQ	DNQ	DNQ	1R	DNQ	DNQ	1R	1R	DNQ	1R	
Players Championship (Note: The event was called the Players Tour Championship Grand Final (2010/2011–2015/2016))	Not Held		A	DNQ	DNQ	1R	DNQ	DNQ	DNQ	DNQ	1R	DNQ	DNQ	DNQ	DNQ	DNQ	DNQ	
World Open (Note: The event was called the Grand Prix (2008/2009–2009/2010))	A	LQ	LQ	LQ	3R	Not Held		SF	3R	1R	F	Not Held			LQ	2R	W	
Tour Championship	Tournament Not Held									DNQ	DNQ	DNQ	DNQ	DNQ	DNQ	DNQ	1R	
World Championship	A	LQ	A	LQ	LQ	LQ	LQ	LQ	1R	1R	1R	LQ	1R	LQ	LQ	LQ	LQ	
Non-ranking tournaments
Champion of Champions	Tournament Not Held				A	A	A	A	A	A	QF	A	A	A	A	A	A	
The Masters	A	A	A	A	A	A	A	A	A	A	A	1R	A	A	A	A	A	
Championship League	A	A	A	A	A	A	A	A	A	A	A	RR	A	A	A	A	A	
Former ranking tournaments
Wuxi Classic (Note: The event was called the Jiangsu Classic (2008/2009–2009/2010))	Non-Ranking			LQ	LQ	WD	Tournament Not Held											
Australian Goldfields Open	Not Held			LQ	LQ	WD	A	Tournament Not Held										
Shanghai Masters	A	LQ	A	LQ	LQ	LQ	LQ	LQ	LQ	Non-Ranking		Not Held			Non-Ranking Event			
Paul Hunter Classic	Pro-am		Minor-Ranking Event					SF	A	4R	NR	Tournament Not Held						
Indian Open	Tournament Not Held				LQ	SF	NH	LQ	LQ	2R	Tournament Not Held							
Riga Masters (Note: The event was called the Riga Open (2014/2015–2015/2016))	Tournament Not Held					Minor-Rank		LQ	2R	A	3R	Tournament Not Held						
China Championship	Tournament Not Held							NR	2R	LQ	1R	Tournament Not Held						
WST Pro Series	Tournament Not Held											RR	Tournament Not Held					
Turkish Masters	Tournament Not Held												3R	Tournament Not Held				
Gibraltar Open	Tournament Not Held						MR	A	WD	3R	QF	4R	2R	Tournament Not Held				
WST Classic	Tournament Not Held													2R	Tournament Not Held			
European Masters	Tournament Not Held							A	2R	1R	QF	1R	1R	LQ	2R	Not Held		
Saudi Arabia Masters	Tournament Not Held															5R	5R	NH
Former non-ranking tournaments
Shoot Out	Not Held		A	3R	3R	1R	2R	Ranking Event										
Haining Open	Tournament Not Held					Minor-Rank		A	A	3R	W	NH	A	A	Tournament Not Held			
Six-red World Championship (Note: The event was called the Six-red Snooker International (2008/2009) and the Six-red World Grand Prix (2009/2010))	2R	3R	3R	2R	2R	2R	W	3R	F	RR	RR	Not Held		F	Tournament Not Held			

Performance Table Legend
LQ	lost in the qualifying draw	#R	lost in the early rounds of the tournament (WR = Wildcard round, RR = Round robin)	QF	lost in the quarter-finals
SF	lost in the semi-finals	F	lost in the final	W	won the tournament
DNQ	did not qualify for the tournament	A	did not participate in the tournament	WD	withdrew from the tournament

NH / Not Held	means an event was not held.
NR / Non-Ranking Event	means an event is/was no longer a ranking event.
R / Ranking Event	means an event is/was a ranking event.
MR / Minor-Ranking Event	means an event is/was a minor-ranking event.
PA / Pro-am Event	means an event is/was a pro-am event.

== Career finals ==
=== Ranking finals: 3 (2 titles) ===
Outcome	No.	Year	Championship	Opponent in the final	Score
Winner	1.	2019	Snooker Shoot Out	(England) Michael Holt	1–0
Runner-up	1.	2019	World Open	(England) Judd Trump	5–10
Winner	2.	2026	World Open	(England) Ronnie O'Sullivan	10–7

=== Minor-ranking finals: 1 ===
Outcome	No.	Year	Championship	Opponent in the final	Score
Runner-up	1.	2015	Xuzhou Open	(England) Joe Perry	1–4

=== Non-ranking finals: 4 (2 titles) ===
Outcome	No.	Year	Championship	Opponent in the final	Score
Winner	1.	2015	Six-red World Championship	(China) Liang Wenbo	8–2
Runner-up	1.	2017	Six-red World Championship	(Wales) Mark Williams	2–8
Winner	2.	2019	Haining Open	(China) Li Hang	5–3
Runner-up	2.	2023	Six-red World Championship (2)	(China) Ding Junhui	6–8

=== Pro-am finals: 2 (1 title) ===
Outcome	No.	Year	Championship	Opponent in the final	Score
Runner-up	1.	2007	Southeast Asian Games (6-red)	(Thailand) Phaitoon Phonbun	1–4
Winner	1.	2011	Southeast Asian Games	(Singapore) Ang Boon Chin	4–1

=== Amateur finals: 3 (2 titles) ===
Outcome	No.	Year	Championship	Opponent in the final	Score
Runner-up	1.	2007	Thailand Amateur Championship	(Thailand) Supoj Saenla	4–5
Winner	1.	2008	IBSF World Championship	(Republic of Ireland) Colm Gilcreest	11–7
Winner	2.	2009	PIOS – Event 7	(England) Lee Page	6–3
