= 2023–24 Q Tour =

Series of snooker tournaments

Details
- Duration: 25 August 2023 – 15 March 2024
- Tournaments: Organised by WPBSA: Q Tour UK/Europe; Q Tour Global Play-Offs; Regional organisers: Q Tour Global - Americas; Q Tour Global - Asia-Pacific; Q Tour Global - Middle East

Play-offs and winners
- Location: Sarajevo, Bosnia and Herzegovina
- Promoted: Michael Holt (ENG); Duane Jones (WAL); Amir Sarkhosh (IRN) †; Mohammed Shehab (UAE) † Promoted for the first time

The 2023–24 Q Tour is a series of snooker tournaments that took place during the 2023–24 snooker season. The Q Tour is the second-tier tour, run by the World Professional Billiards and Snooker Association, for players not on the main World Snooker Tour.

A series of seven UK/Europe events were played, with the leading money-winner gaining a place on the main tour for the 2024–25 snooker season. Eighteen players – the tournament winners and the highest-ranked players who had not already secured a place on the main tour for the 2023–24 season – gained entry to a further event, the WPBSA Q Tour Global Play-Offs. They were joined by six players from the Q Tour Global; qualifying from three regional Q Tour series. The two qualifiers from the Asia-Pacific series withdrew and were replaced by the next two players from the Q Tour UK/Europe rankings. These 24 players competed for a further three places on the World Snooker Tour.

Michael Holt won three of the first six UK/Europe events to guarantee his position as the leading money-winner and gain a place on the main tour. Duane Jones, Amir Sarkhosh and Mohammed Shehab got places through the Q Tour Global Play-Offs.

== Q Tour UK/Europe ==
=== Format ===
UK/Europe events are generally played over three days. The first day is an open qualifying day with 16 places available. The main draw starts on the second day when the 16 qualifiers are joined by the 48 seeded players who qualified based on their rankings in the 2023 Q School Orders of Merit to make a first round field of 64 players. There are three rounds on the second day and a further three on the final day, to determine the winner of the event. The 48 who qualified directly included the top 32 eligible players from the 2023 UK Q School Order of Merit, the top eight from the 2023 Asia-Oceania Q School Order of Merit, and the eight highest ranked junior players on the 2023 UK Q School Order of Merit, not already qualified.

=== Prize fund ===
Each UK/Europe event featured a prize fund of £14,300 with the winner receiving £3,000.

- Winner: £3,000
- Runner-up: £1,500
- Semi-final: £900
- Quarter-final: £600
- Last 16: £300
- Last 32: £200
- Total: £14,300

=== Schedule ===
The schedule for the seven Q Tour UK/Europe events is given below.

Date		Country	Tournament	Venue	City	Field	Winner	Runner-up	Score	Ref.
25 Aug	27 Aug	ENG	Event 1	North East Snooker Centre	North Shields	115	(Wales) Liam Davies	(England) Craig Steadman	5–2	
15 Sep	17 Sep	SWE	Event 2	Snookerhallen	Stockholm	105	(England) Michael Holt	(Wales) Liam Davies	5–2	
20 Oct	22 Oct	GER	Event 3	TSG Heilbronn	Heilbronn	106	(Germany) Umut Dikme	(England) Hamim Hussain	5–1	
9 Nov	12 Nov	ENG	Event 4	Landywood Snooker Club	Great Wyrley	139	(Poland) Antoni Kowalski	(Jamaica) Rory McLeod	5–3	
15 Dec	17 Dec	ENG	Event 5	Castle Snooker Club	Brighton	120	(England) Michael Holt	(England) Daniel Womersley	5–1	
5 Jan	7 Jan	BUL	Event 6	National Snooker Academy	Sofia	77	(England) Michael Holt	(Wales) Alfie Davies	5–4	
16 Feb	18 Feb	ENG	Event 7	Northern Snooker Centre	Leeds	117	(England) Peter Lines	(Germany) Umut Dikme	5–1	

=== Rankings ===
Below are listed the leading players in the prize money rankings. The top-ranked player gets a place on the main tour for the 2023–24 season. Eighteen other players – the tournament winners and the highest-ranked players who have not already secured a place on the main tour – gained entry to a further event, the WPBSA Q Tour Global Playoff. The two qualifiers from the Asia-Pacific series withdrew and were replaced by the next two players from the rankings, increasing the number of players who qualified to 20. Players on equal points were ranked by "countback", with the player having won the most prize money in the latest event played being ranked higher.

Rank	Player	Event 1	Event 2	Event 3	Event 4	Event 5	Event 6	Event 7	Total (£)
1	(England) Michael Holt *	–	3,000	600	200	3,000	3,000	–	9,800
2	(Wales) Liam Davies +	3,000	1,500	0	200	200	600	200	5,700
3	(England) Peter Lines +	200	600	900	300	600	0	3,000	5,600
4	(Germany) Umut Dikme +	0	300	3,000	0	200	200	1,500	5,200
5	(Poland) Antoni Kowalski +	–	900	200	3,000	0	300	–	4,400
6	(England) Harvey Chandler +	200	200	900	900	0	900	900	4,000
7	(England) Craig Steadman +	1,500	300	200	600	200	200	0	3,000
8	(Wales) Duane Jones +	600	200	200	200	200	600	900	2,900
9	(England) Barry Pinches +	300	0	600	300	900	300	300	2,700
10	(Wales) Alfie Davies +	300	900	0	0	0	1,500	0	2,700
11	(England) Daniel Womersley +	0	600	0	0	1,500	200	300	2,600
12	(Ukraine) Iulian Boiko +	600	200	0	600	0	300	600	2,300
13	(Jamaica) Rory McLeod +	300	200	0	1,500	0	0	200	2,200
14	(England) Ryan Davies +	900	300	200	200	0	300	200	2,100
15	(Scotland) Chris Totten +	0	200	300	0	900	300	300	2,000
16	(England) Steven Hallworth +	200	0	200	900	0	600	0	1,900
17	(Wales) Tyler Rees +	900	0	200	0	0	0	600	1,700
18	(England) Hamim Hussain +	0	200	1,500	0	0	0	0	1,700
19	(Austria) Florian Nuessle +	200	600	300	0	0	200	300	1,600
20	(England) Peter Devlin +	0	300	600	0	300	0	200	1,400
21	(Hong Kong) Yu Kiu Chang +	–	200	600	0	0	600	0	1,400

* Qualified for the main tour
+ Qualified for the Q Tour Global Playoff

=== Event 1 ===
The first UK/Europe event took place at North East Snooker Centre, North Shields, from 25 to 27 August 2023. Liam Davies beat Craig Steadman 5–2 in the final. After a walkover at the last 64 stage, Davies won his next four matches in the deciding frame to reach his first Q Tour final. Davies took a 2–0 lead in the final and although Steadman reduced the deficit to 3–2, Davies took the next two frames to win the match. The final-day results are given below.

Quarter-finals; Best of 7 frames
(England) Craig Steadman	4
(Ukraine) Iulian Boiko	2
(India) Asutosh Padhy	3
(Wales) Tyler Rees	4
(Wales) Duane Jones	3
(Wales) Liam Davies	4
(India) Kreishh Gurbaxani	2
(England) Ryan Davies	4

Semi-finals; Best of 7 frames
(England) Craig Steadman	4
(Wales) Tyler Rees	3
(Wales) Liam Davies	4
(England) Ryan Davies	3

Final; Best of 9 frames
(England) Craig Steadman	2
(Wales) Liam Davies	5

=== Event 2 ===
The second UK/Europe event took place at Snookerhallen, Stockholm, Sweden from 15 to 17 September 2023. Michael Holt lost only two frames in reaching the final and then beat Liam Davies, the winner of event 1, 5–2 in the final. The final-day results are given below.

Quarter-finals; Best of 7 frames
(Austria) Florian Nuessle	3
(Wales) Liam Davies	4
(England) Sean McAllister	1
(Poland) Antoni Kowalski	4
(Wales) Alfie Davies	4
(England) Peter Lines	1
(England) Michael Holt	4
(England) Daniel Womersley	0

Semi-finals; Best of 7 frames
(Wales) Liam Davies	4
(Poland) Antoni Kowalski	0
(Wales) Alfie Davies	1
(England) Michael Holt	4

Final; Best of 9 frames
(Wales) Liam Davies	2
(England) Michael Holt	5

=== Event 3 ===
The third UK/Europe event took place at TSG Heilbronn, Heilbronn, Germany from 20 to 22 October 2023. Umut Dikme beat Hamim Hussain 5–1 in the final, finishing with a break of 106. The final-day results are given below.

Quarter-finals; Best of 7 frames
(England) Barry Pinches	1
(England) Harvey Chandler	4
(England) Hamim Hussain	4
(England) Michael Holt	3
(Germany) Umut Dikme	4
(Hong Kong) Yu Kiu Chang	2
(England) Peter Devlin	1
(England) Peter Lines	4

Semi-finals; Best of 7 frames
(England) Harvey Chandler	0
(England) Hamim Hussain	4
(Germany) Umut Dikme	4
(England) Peter Lines	2

Final; Best of 9 frames
(England) Hamim Hussain	1
(Germany) Umut Dikme	5

=== Event 4 ===
The fourth UK/Europe event took place at the Landywood Snooker Club, Great Wyrley, England from 9 to 12 November 2023. Antoni Kowalski beat Rory McLeod 5–3 in the final. Kowalski led 4–0 and although McLeod won the next three frames, Kowalski won frame eight to clinch the match. The final-day results are given below.

Quarter-finals; Best of 7 frames
(England) Harvey Chandler	4
(Ukraine) Iulian Boiko	0
(England) Sydney Wilson	0
(Jamaica) Rory McLeod	4
(England) Craig Steadman	2
(Poland) Antoni Kowalski	4
(England) Tom Maxfield	1
(England) Steven Hallworth	4

Semi-finals; Best of 7 frames
(England) Harvey Chandler	0
(Jamaica) Rory McLeod	4
(Poland) Antoni Kowalski	4
(England) Steven Hallworth	1

Final; Best of 9 frames
(Jamaica) Rory McLeod	3
(Poland) Antoni Kowalski	5

=== Event 5 ===
The fifth UK/Europe event took place at the Castle Snooker Club, Brighton, England from 15 to 17 December 2023. Michael Holt beat Daniel Womersley 5–1 in the final to win his second UK/Europe Q Tour event of the season. His closest match was in the semi-finals where he won the deciding frame against Barry Pinches. The final-day results are given below.

Quarter-finals; Best of 7 frames
(England) Peter Lines	1
(England) Barry Pinches	4
(England) Michael Holt	4
(England) Hayden Staniland	1
(England) Luke Pinches	3
(England) Daniel Womersley	4
(Scotland) Chris Totten	4
(England) Mark Lloyd	1

Semi-finals; Best of 7 frames
(England) Barry Pinches	3
(England) Michael Holt	4
(England) Daniel Womersley	4
(Scotland) Chris Totten	0

Final; Best of 9 frames
(England) Michael Holt	5
(England) Daniel Womersley	1

=== Event 6 ===
The sixth UK/Europe event took place at the National Snooker Academy of Bulgaria in Sofia from 5 to 7 January 2024. Michael Holt beat Alfie Davies 5–4 in the final to win his third UK/Europe Q Tour event of the season and secure his return to the main tour. Davies led 4–2 before Holt won the final three frames, which included breaks of 140 in frame seven and 128 in the last frame. The final-day results are given below.

Quarter-finals; Best of 7 frames
(England) Harvey Chandler	4
(Wales) Duane Jones	2
(Wales) Alfie Davies	4
(Wales) Liam Davies	0
(England) Michael Holt	4
(Hong Kong) Yu Kiu Chang	1
(England) Steven Hallworth	3
(England) Matthew Glasby	4

Semi-finals; Best of 7 frames
(England) Harvey Chandler	1
(Wales) Alfie Davies	4
(England) Michael Holt	4
(England) Matthew Glasby	2

Final; Best of 9 frames
(Wales) Alfie Davies	4
(England) Michael Holt	5

=== Event 7 ===
The seventh UK/Europe event took place at the Northern Snooker Centre in Leeds from 16 to 18 February 2024. Peter Lines beat Umut Dikme 5–1 in the final. Lines had been 3–1 behind in his semi-final match against Harvey Chandler but won the final three frames. The final-day results are given below.

Quarter-finals; Best of 7 frames
(England) Harvey Chandler	4
(England) Haydon Pinhey	1
(England) Peter Lines	4
(Ukraine) Iulian Boiko	1
(Wales) Duane Jones	4
(England) Phil O'Kane	1
(Germany) Umut Dikme	4
(Wales) Tyler Rees	3

Semi-finals; Best of 7 frames
(England) Harvey Chandler	3
(England) Peter Lines	4
(Wales) Duane Jones	1
(Germany) Umut Dikme	4

Final; Best of 9 frames
(England) Peter Lines	5
(Germany) Umut Dikme	1

== Q Tour Global ==
The Q Tour Global consisted of three regional Q Tour series held outside the UK/Europe area. Initially it was intended that up to eight players would qualify through the regional events for the Q Tour Global Playoff. However, this was later reduced to six, two from each of the regional series.

=== Asia-Pacific series ===
Two players qualified from a series of three events organised by the Asia-Pacific Snooker and Billiards Federation, one in New Zealand and two in Australia. Vinnie Calabrese, who won the two Australian events, finished in first place in the rankings and Rob Redgrove, the winner of the New Zealand event, finished second.

The schedule for the three Q Tour Asia-Pacific events is given below.

Date		Country	Tournament	Venue	City	Field	Winner	Runner-up	Score	Ref.
28 Sep	1 Oct	NZL	Event 1 (Note: Event also known as the New Zealand Open.)	The Richmond Club	Christchurch	45	(New Zealand) Rob Redgrove	(New Zealand) Adam Shaw	5–4	
12 Oct	15 Oct	AUS	Event 2 (Note: Event also known as the Bob Hawke AC Australian Open.)	Mounties Club	Sydney	111	(Australia) Vinnie Calabrese	(Australia) Steve Mifsud	6–3	
25 Jan	28 Jan	AUS	Event 3 (Note: Event also known as the Clem Jones AO Queensland Open.)	Matchroom Snooker Centre	Brisbane	71	(Australia) Vinnie Calabrese	(Australia) Adrian Law	5–3	

=== Americas series ===
Two players qualified from a series of two events organised by the Pan American Billiards and Snooker Association. The winners of the two events, Vito Puopolo and Hasanain Khalid Alsultani, qualified for the playoff. Initially three events were planned with separate ranking lists for North America and South America. The South American event was still held, in Brazil in March 2024, but became the first event of the 2024–25 series.

The schedule for the two Q Tour Americas events is given below.

Date		Country	Tournament	Venue	City	Field	Winner	Runner-up	Score	Ref.
19 Jan	21 Jan	CAN	Event 1	The Corner Bank	Toronto	22	(Canada) Vito Puopolo	(Canada) Jason Williams	5–1	
22 Feb	25 Feb	USA	Event 2	PABSA Academy	San Jose	28	(United States) Hasanain Khalid Alsultani	(United States) Sargon Isaac	5–4	

=== Middle East series ===
Two players qualified from a series of three events, organised by the UAE Cue Sports and played in Abu Dhabi. Amir Sarkhosh, who won the first two events, finished in first place in the rankings while Mohammed Shehab, the winner of the final event, finished in second place.

The schedule for the three Q Tour Middle East events is given below.

Date		Country	Tournament	Venue	City	Field	Winner	Runner-up	Score	Ref.
4 Jan	9 Jan	UAE	Event 1	Cue Sports Academy	Abu Dhabi	31	(Iran) Amir Sarkhosh	(Bahrain) Habib Humood	4–0	
11 Jan	17 Jan	UAE	Event 2	Cue Sports Academy	Abu Dhabi	36	(Iran) Amir Sarkhosh	(United Arab Emirates) Mohammed Shehab	4–3	
18 Jan	24 Jan	UAE	Event 3	Cue Sports Academy	Abu Dhabi	36	(United Arab Emirates) Mohammed Shehab	(Syria) Yazan Alhaddad	4–0	

== Q Tour Playoff ==
The final event, the WPBSA Q Tour Playoff, was held at the Hotel Hills, in Sarajevo, Bosnia and Herzegovina, from 13 to 15 March. The event saw 24 players compete for a further three places on the main tour. Eighteen players qualified for the playoff through the Q Tour UK/Europe rankings, with six players qualifying through Q Tour Global, two from each of the three series. The two qualifiers from the Asia-Pacific series withdrew and were replaced by the next two players from the Q Tour UK/Europe rankings.

=== Playoff 1 ===
Duane Jones qualified from the first group after beating Liam Davies 10–9 in the group final. Jones led 6–3 after the first session of the final, but Davies won six of the next seven frames to lead 9–7. However Jones then won the last three frames to win the match. In his semi-final match against Florian Nuessle, Jones lost the first three frames but then won the next six. The results for the first group are given below.

Quarter-finals; Best of 9 frames
(Wales) Liam Davies	5
(England) Peter Devlin	2
(England) Hamim Hussain	2
(Jamaica) Rory McLeod	5
(Wales) Duane Jones	5
(Canada) Vito Puopolo	0
(Austria) Florian Nuessle	5
(England) Craig Steadman	2

Semi-finals; Best of 11 frames
(Wales) Liam Davies	6
(Jamaica) Rory McLeod	1
(Wales) Duane Jones	6
(Austria) Florian Nuessle	3

Final; Best of 19 frames
(Wales) Liam Davies	9
(Wales) Duane Jones	10

=== Playoff 2 ===
Amir Sarkhosh won the second group after defeating Iulian Boiko 10–8 in the group final. Sarkhosh led 6–3 after the first session and increased his lead to 9–5. Boiko won the next three frames before Sarkhosh won frame 18 to win the match. The results for the second group are given below.

Quarter-finals; Best of 9 frames
(England) Peter Lines	3
(Wales) Tyler Rees	5
(Scotland) Chris Totten	1
(Ukraine) Iulian Boiko	5
(England) Barry Pinches	2
(England) Steven Hallworth	5
(Iran) Amir Sarkhosh	5
(England) Harvey Chandler	4

Semi-finals; Best of 11 frames
(Wales) Tyler Rees	1
(Ukraine) Iulian Boiko	6
(England) Steven Hallworth	2
(Iran) Amir Sarkhosh	6

Final; Best of 19 frames
(Ukraine) Iulian Boiko	8
(Iran) Amir Sarkhosh	10

=== Playoff 3 ===
Mohammed Shehab won the second group after defeating Yu Kiu Chang 10–8 in the group final. Shehab led 6–3 after the first session. Chang reduced the deficit to one frame at the final session interval but Shehab won three of the next five frames to win the match. The results for the third group are given below.

Quarter-finals; Best of 9 frames
(Germany) Umut Dikme	5
(England) Ryan Davies	1
(United Arab Emirates) Mohammed Shehab	5
(England) Daniel Womersley	0
(Wales) Alfie Davies	3
(Hong Kong) Yu Kiu Chang	5
(United States) Hasanain Khalid Alsultani	0
(Poland) Antoni Kowalski	5

Semi-finals; Best of 11 frames
(Germany) Umut Dikme	5
(United Arab Emirates) Mohammed Shehab	6
(Hong Kong) Yu Kiu Chang	6
(Poland) Antoni Kowalski	4

Final; Best of 19 frames
(United Arab Emirates) Mohammed Shehab	10
(Hong Kong) Yu Kiu Chang	8
