= Q Tour =

Snooker tournament

WPBSA Q Tour
- Current season, competition or edition: 2026–27 Q Tour
- Sport: Snooker
- First season: 1994 (as the Minor Tour); 2018 (current format)
- Organising body: WPBSA
- Subdivision: Q Tour Europe; Q Tour Global (Q Tour Americas, Q Tour Asia-Pacific)
- Most recent champion: Jamie Clarke (WAL)
- Qualification: Q School; Open entry (Preliminary rounds and non-Europe events)
- Level on pyramid: 2
- Promotion to: World Snooker Tour
- Tournament format: Knockout events with play-off finals
- Website: https://wpbsa.com/events-list/wpbsa-q-tour/

The Q Tour, officially the WPBSA Q Tour, is a second-tier series of snooker tournaments immediately below the level of the World Snooker Tour, consisting of amateur and ex-professional players to compete for qualifying places to the main tour. It is administered by the World Professional Billiards and Snooker Association (WPBSA).

Originally known as the Minor Tour, UK Tour and then the Challenge Tour, the WPBSA then operated the tournament as a supplementary circuit for the lower-ranked professionals until the end of the 2004–05 season; it was later repositioned as an amateur-only event and revived from the 2018–19 season after a 14-year hiatus. The series expanded to other European countries outside of England and rebranded to its current name from the 2021–22 season, and since the 2023–24 season regional Q Tour franchises are also introduced under the Q Tour Global banner. There are now around 20 Q Tour events to be held during a regular snooker season.

== History ==
=== Early editions ===
The concept of a secondary professional tour was first experimented with in the 1994–95 season in the form of the WPBSA Minor Tour to provide competition for lower ranked professionals, but only ran for a season. A two-tiered tour structure was formally adopted from the 1997–98 season due to over-subscription of the Main Tour, where all professionals can compete in the UK Tour and the best performers could earn promotion. From the 1999–2000 season, entry was limited to players not competing on the Main Tour and exclusive membership was implemented from the 2001–02 season. From the 2000–01 season it was rebranded the Challenge Tour. In its first season there were five events, but the number was reduced to four in the following seasons. There were two official maximum breaks at the UK Tour, both in the 1998–99 season; the first was made by Stuart Bingham against Barry Hawkins in Event 3, and the second by Nick Dyson against Adrian Gunnell in Event 4.

After the WPBSA's split with the English amateur governing body EASB, the Challenge Tour was subsequently axed upon completion of the 2004–05 season and was being replaced by the EASB's International Open Series (PIOS) as the second-tier tournament. Pro-am tournaments, such as the Pro Challenge Series and later the Players Tour Championship, was introduced for the 2009–10 season with all tour players being eligible to play with an amateur leg. They also counted towards the rankings for professionals on the Main Tour, and any player who finished in the top 8 of the PTC Order of Merit was guaranteed a tour card for the following season.

=== Return to amateur-only event and expansion ===
The Challenge Tour in its initial format was revived in the 2018–19 season, consisting of ten events each played by only amateur players over one or two days; 72 players (top 64 of the Q School Order of Merit, plus eight wildcards) were fielded and there was prize money. The top two players from the Challenge Tour Order of Merit received a main tour invitation card for the following season. A playoff final event was introduced in the 2019–20 season.

From the 2020–21 season, the Challenge Tour was rebranded as the Q Tour (retrospectively known as Q Tour Europe). It was expanded to other regions in the form of Q Tour Global from the 2023–24 season, with the regional Order of Merit winners being qualified for a place in the play-offs.

== Format ==
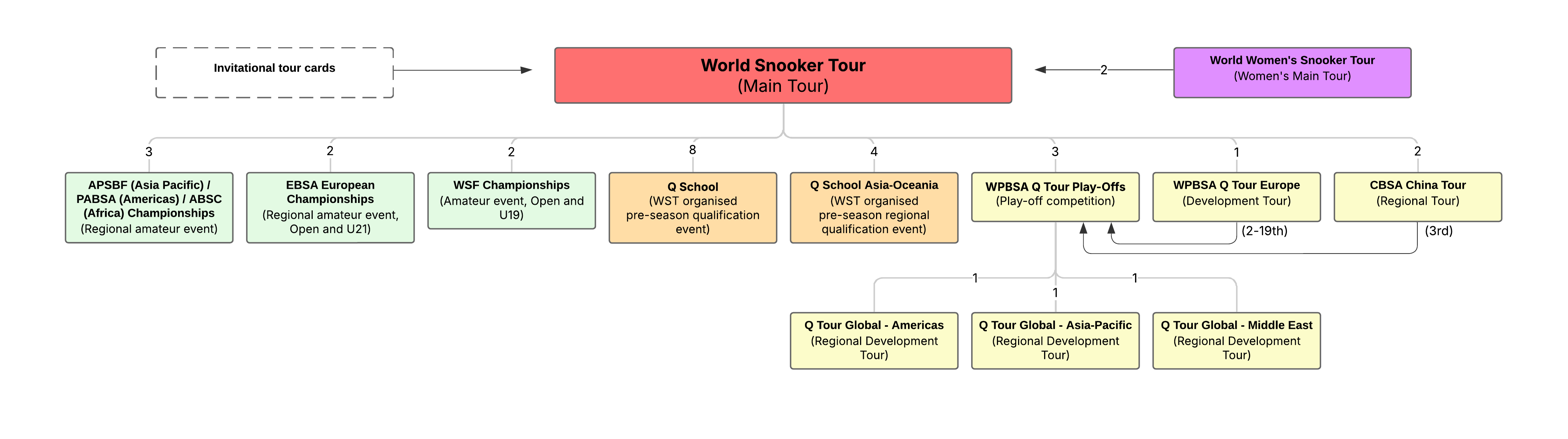
Pathways to enter the main tour, including the WPBSA Q Tour

Q Tour events are generally played over three days with the first day being an open qualifying day.

In a Q Tour Europe event, the main draw starts on the second day when the 16 open qualifiers are joined by the 48 seeded players to form a 64-player knockout competition. It consists of the top 32 eligible players from the Q School Order of Merit, another top eight junior players who are not already qualified, and the last eight places from the Asia-Oceania version of Q School. In other regional events, entrants are largely local players and do not involve seedings.

After all Q Tour Europe events are played, the eighteen highest-ranked players who have not already secured a place on the main tour will gain entry to a further event, the WPBSA Q Tour Global Play-Off. They are joined by five players from the Regional Q Tour winners outside Europe and one player from the CBSA China Tour third-ranked. These players will compete for a further three places on the World Snooker Tour.

== Winners ==
Season	No. of events	Order of Merit winner	Playoff winner(s)		
UK Tour (professional non-ranking)
1997–98	5	(Scotland) Paul McPhillips			
1998–99	4	(England) Alfie Burden			
1999–2000	4	(England) Barry Hawkins			
Challenge Tour (professional non-ranking)
2000–01	4	(England) Shaun Murphy			
2001–02	4	(Wales) Ryan Day			
2002–03	4	(England) Martin Gould			
2003–04	4	(England) Brian Salmon			
2004–05	4	(England) Jamie Cope			
Challenge Tour (amateur)
2018–19	10	(England) Brandon Sargeant (Note: Extra promotion places were given that year; David Grace and Mitchell Mann have also qualified for the main tour through Order of Merit)			
2019–20	11	(England) Ashley Hugill (Note: The player has already qualified for the main tour through other means; Lukas Kleckers was therefore promoted through Order of Merit)	(England) Allan Taylor		
Q Tour (amateur)
2021–22	5	(China) Si Jiahui (Note: The player has already qualified for the main tour through other means; Sean O'Sullivan was therefore promoted through Order of Merit)	(Belgium) Julien Leclercq		
2022–23	7	(England) Martin O'Donnell	(England) Ashley Carty		
2023–24	16	(England) Michael Holt	(Wales) Duane Jones	(Iran) Amir Sarkhosh	(United Arab Emirates) Mohamed Shehab
2024–25	20	(China) Zhao Xintong (Note: The player has already qualified for the main tour through other means; Dylan Emery was therefore promoted through Order of Merit)	(England) Steven Hallworth	(England) Liam Highfield	(Austria) Florian Nüßle
2025–26	21	(Wales) Jamie Clarke	(England) Ashley Carty	(England) Ashley Hugill	(England) Craig Steadman

== See also ==
- Q School
- WSF Championship
