= Mekhong (spirit) =

Thai liquor

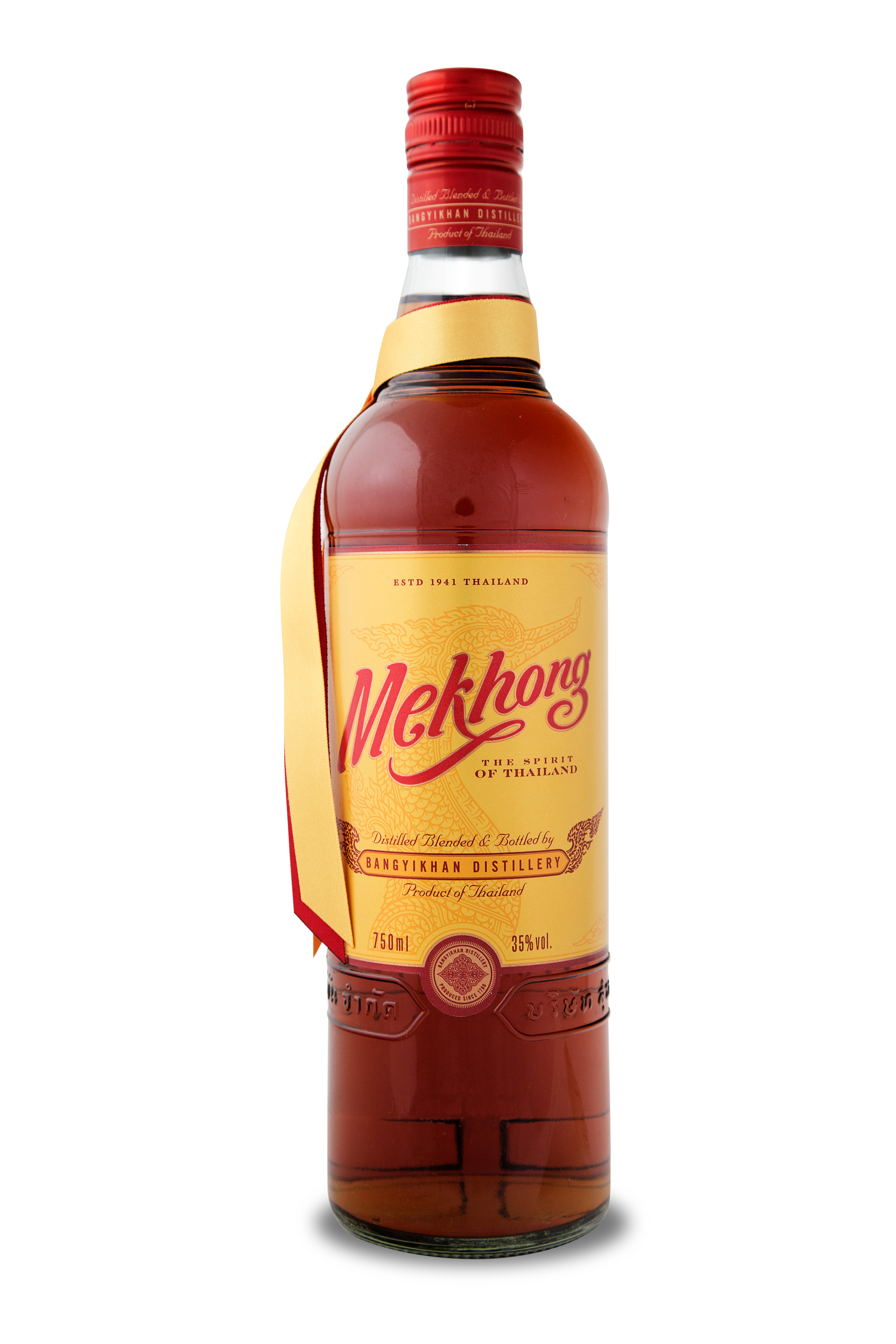
Mekhong 700ml

Mekhong (แม่โขง) is Thailand's first domestically produced branded golden spirit. It is also known as "The Spirit of Thailand".

== History ==
In 1914, the ownership of the privately owned Sura Bangyikhan Distillery (lit. Bangyikhan Liquor Distillery) was transferred to the government of Thailand to be under the supervision of the Excise Department, Ministry of Finance. The department then opened a bidding for a concession to raise money for the treasury and authorized the bidder to produce and distribute spirits within a specified area.

The concession agreement expired in 1927 during the reign of King Prajadhipok. The Department then cancelled the concession for spirit distillation and distribution before taking over the spirit production on 1 April 1929. The distillery was modernized and it produced a new "28-degree" blended spirit under a number of brands including "Chiang-Chun", which is still available today. As for spirit distribution, the department continued with the concession and appointed wholesalers for each area.

Later, the Excise Department concocted another blended spirit using herbs combined with a traditional medicated liquor recipe. Herbs and spices were fermented in a spirit of high alcohol content before adding the desired flavor, aroma, and the preferred degree of alcohol. The result was a new kind of spirit which was smooth enough to be drunk neat. It was further developed into a "special blended spirit" which could be enjoyed neat or with a mix of soda. In those days, the preferred drink was imported whiskey mixed with soda. This imported whiskey resulted in a substantial loss of income to the country each year. The special blended spirit produced by the Excise Department helped reduce imports significantly.

Under the government of Field Marshal Plaek Phibunsongkram, Thailand demanded that four provinces located on the right side of the Mekong River be returned from French occupation. This led to the Franco-Thai War. These provinces were Siemmarat, Phra Tabong, Si Sophon, and Nakhon Champasak, now parts of Laos and Cambodia. Luang Wichitwathakan, the then-Director-General of the Fine Arts Department composed Kham Khong (lit. Across Mekong), a patriotic song with Thai lyrics using the melody of the Western song Swanee River. This song was created to remind Thai people of these four provinces so that they would always be remembered as part of Thailand.

The Kham Khong song was very popular and avidly instilled a patriotic sense into the hearts of Thai people. Such a dramatic effect influenced the Excise Department to use "Mekhong" to name the 35-degree special blended spirit that was newly produced in 1941.

== Composition ==
Despite being known as a whisky, Mekhong is much more a rum. The distilled spirit is made from 95 percent sugar cane/molasses and five percent rice. The distilled spirit is then blended with indigenous herbs and spices to produce its aroma and taste. Mekhong is distilled, blended, and bottled at the Bangyikhan Distillery on the outskirts of Bangkok. It contains 35 percent alcohol by volume, and it is used in a cocktail called the "Thai Sabai".

== In popular culture ==
Mekhong Rum is mentioned several times on the album Hell's Ditch by The Pogues, along with other common Thai drinks. "Mekhong" (Mekong) is also the name of a popular song recorded by The Refreshments on the album Fizzy Fuzzy Big & Buzzy. In the song, the singer, at a bar in Bangkok, is recently arrived from Taipei. He repeatedly orders Mekhong for himself and a new friend (whose name he cannot remember), always allowing the bartender to keep the change.

== See also ==
- SangSom
