= Six-red World Championship =

Snooker tournament

Tournament information
- Venue: Bangkok Convention Center Hall
- Location: Bangkok
- Country: Thailand
- Established: 2008
- Organisation(s): WPBSA (since 2012)
- Total prize fund: ฿10,000,000
- Recent edition: 2023
- Current champion: Ding Junhui (CHN)

The Six-red World Championship is a six-red snooker tournament, played with the six colour balls and six reds. Ding Junhui is the reigning champion.

== History ==
The event was first held in the 2008/2009 season, and was known as the Six-red Snooker International. The event was organised by the Asian Confederation of Billiards Sports. Forty-eight players were divided in 8 round-robin groups. The top four from each group moved into the knock-out stage. In 2009 the event was renamed the Six-red World Grand Prix. In 2010, it replaced a rival tournament (sponsored by 888sport) as the official six red snooker world championship, after the other event—held once in 2009—was discontinued. The event was not held in the 2011/2012 season, but it returned for the 2012/2013 season with the backing of the World Professional Billiards and Snooker Association. The event was held at the Montien Riverside Hotel in Bangkok, Thailand between 2008 and 2014. The following year it took place in the Fashion Island Shopping Mall, before the Convention Centre became the venue for the tournament from 2016 on.

The COVID-19 pandemic in 2020 prevented the event from being scheduled as it was not possible for tour players to travel to Thailand. In the 2022-23 snooker season, the event was listed as returning to the tour for the first time since 2019, where Stephen Maguire would have had an opportunity to defend his title. However, in the weeks leading up to the tournaments' official start date of 5 September 2022, the professional membership were notified that the tournament was to be postponed. This decision led to criticism of the World Snooker Tour, as despite the well-understood position of the tournament being postponed by both players and broadcasters, no announcement had been made to the public. It was ultimately held during March of 2023, with Ding Junhui winning his second title.

== Winners ==
Year	Winner	Runner-up	Final score	Venue	City	Season
Six-red Snooker International (non-ranking, 2008)
2008	Ricky Walden (ENG)	Stuart Bingham (ENG)	8–3	Montien Riverside Hotel	Bangkok, Thailand	2008/09
Six-red World Grand Prix (non-ranking, 2009)
2009	Jimmy White (ENG)	Barry Hawkins (ENG)	8–6	Montien Riverside Hotel	Bangkok, Thailand	2009/10
Six-red World Championship (non-ranking, 2010–present)
2010	Mark Selby (ENG)	Ricky Walden (ENG)	8–6	Montien Riverside Hotel	Bangkok, Thailand	2010/11
2012	Mark Davis (ENG)	Shaun Murphy (ENG)	8–4	Montien Riverside Hotel	Bangkok, Thailand	2012/13
2013	Mark Davis (ENG)	Neil Robertson (AUS)	8–4	Montien Riverside Hotel	Bangkok, Thailand	2013/14
2014	Stephen Maguire (SCO)	Ricky Walden (ENG)	8–7	Montien Riverside Hotel	Bangkok, Thailand	2014/15
2015	Thepchaiya Un-Nooh (THA)	Liang Wenbo (CHN)	8–2	Fashion Island Shopping Mall	Bangkok, Thailand	2015/16
2016	Ding Junhui (CHN)	Stuart Bingham (ENG)	8–7	Bangkok Convention Center Hall	Bangkok, Thailand	2016/17
2017	Mark Williams (WAL)	Thepchaiya Un-Nooh (THA)	8–2	Bangkok Convention Center Hall	Bangkok, Thailand	2017/18
2018	Kyren Wilson (ENG)	Ding Junhui (CHN)	8–4	Bangkok Convention Center Hall	Bangkok, Thailand	2018/19
2019	Stephen Maguire (SCO)	John Higgins (SCO)	8–6	Bangkok Convention Center Hall	Bangkok, Thailand	2019/20
2020–2022	Cancelled due to the COVID-19 pandemic					
2023	Ding Junhui (CHN)	Thepchaiya Un-Nooh (THA)	8–6	Thammasat University Convention Centre	Bangkok, Thailand	2022/23

== Stats ==
=== Finalists ===
Name	Nationality	Winner	Runner-up	Finals
Ding Junhui	China	2	1	3
Mark Davis	England	2	0	2
Stephen Maguire	Scotland	2	0	2
Thepchaiya Un-Nooh	Thailand	1	2	3
Ricky Walden	England	1	2	3
Mark Selby	England	1	0	1
Jimmy White	England	1	0	1
Mark Williams	Wales	1	0	1
Kyren Wilson	England	1	0	1
Stuart Bingham	England	0	2	2
Barry Hawkins	England	0	1	1
John Higgins	Scotland	0	1	1
Liang Wenbo	China	0	1	1
Shaun Murphy	England	0	1	1
Neil Robertson	Australia	0	1	1
