= New Zealand Open (disambiguation) =

New Zealand Open may refer to:

- New Zealand Open, the leading men's golf tournament in New Zealand
- New Zealand Open (badminton), an international badminton tournament held in New Zealand.
- New Zealand Open (darts)
- New Zealand Open (men's tennis), international men's tennis tournament held in Auckland
- New Zealand Open (women's tennis) international women's tennis tournament held in Auckland
