= 2024–25 snooker season =

Series of snooker tournaments

Details
- Duration: 10 June 2024 – 27 May 2025
- Tournaments: World Snooker Tour: 23 (18 ranking events); WPBSA Q Tour: 20; World Women's: 8 World Seniors: 1

Triple Crown winners
- UK Championship: Judd Trump (ENG)
- Masters: Shaun Murphy (ENG)
- World Championship: Zhao Xintong (CHN)

The 2024–25 snooker season was a professional snooker season featuring tournaments played between June 2024 and May 2025, including the professional World Snooker Tour, the second-tier Q Tour and featured events from World Women's Snooker and World Seniors Tour. The season featured 18 ranking tournaments, including a ranking tournament in Hong Kong for the first time after a 30-year hiatus and a ranking event staged in Saudi Arabia for the first time. The European Series was discontinued and the European Masters was removed from the calendar.

This season saw the reigning world champion Kyren Wilson, the world number one Judd Trump, Mark Selby, and Neil Robertson claim multiple titles. John Higgins won the World Open and Tour Championship, setting a record span of 30 years between his first and most recent ranking titles. In the Triple Crown events, Trump won his second UK Championship title and Shaun Murphy won his second Masters title. After returning from a 20-month ban, Zhao Xintong won four qualifying matches to reach the main stage of the World Championship and went on to win his first world title with an 18–12 victory over Mark Williams, who was the oldest ever world finalist at age 50. Zhao became the first World Champion from China and also the first from Asia. The season set a new record for the number of maximum breaks made in professional competition, with 15, although this record was broken the following season. Trump set a new record for the most century breaks in a single season, with 107.

== Players ==
The World Snooker Tour in the 2024–25 season initially consisted of 127 professional players, but dropped to 126 after Michael White had his WPBSA membership revoked. The tour includes the top 64 players from the prize money rankings after the 2024 World Championship and 31 players who earned a two-year card the previous year.

=== New professional players ===
The players listed below have received a two-year tour card for the 2024–25 and 2025–26 seasons.

Top 4 players from 2023 to 2024 one year ranking list

1. Zak Surety (ENG)
2. Julien Leclercq (BEL)
3. Oliver Lines (ENG)
4. Ben Mertens (BEL)

International champions

5. WSF Open champion: Cheung Ka Wai (HKG)
6. WSF Junior champion: Bulcsú Révész (HUN)
7. EBSA European champion: Robbie McGuigan (NIR)
8. EBSA European Under-21 champion: Liam Davies (WAL)
9. APSBF Asia Pacific champion: Lei Peifan (CHN)
10. PABSA Americas champion: Jonas Luz (BRA)
11. ABSC African champion: Hatem Yassen (EGY)

Q Tour

Main article: 2023–24 Q Tour
12. Highest ranked: Michael Holt (ENG)
13. Playoff: Duane Jones (WAL)
14. Playoff: Amir Sarkhosh (IRN)
15. Playoff: Mohammed Shehab (UAE)

CBSA China Tour

16. Gong Chenzhi (CHN)
17. Huang Jiahao (CHN)

World Women's Snooker qualifiers

18. Women's World Champion: Bai Yulu (CHN)
19. Highest Ranked: Mink Nutcharut (THA)

Q School

Main article: 2024 Q School

Event 1

20. Artemijs Žižins (LVA)
21. Allan Taylor (ENG)
22. Haydon Pinhey (ENG)
23. Wang Yuchen (HKG)

Event 2

24. Antoni Kowalski (POL)
25. Chris Totten (SCO)
26. Farakh Ajaib (PAK)
27. Mitchell Mann (ENG)

Asia-Oceania Event 1

28. Lim Kok Leong (MAS)
29. Sunny Akani (THA)

Asia-Oceania Event 2

30. Haris Tahir (PAK)
31. Kreishh Gurbaxani (IND)

Invitational Tour Card

32. Ken Doherty (IRL)

== Calendar ==
The following tables outline the dates and results for all the World Snooker Tour, World Women's Snooker Tour, World Seniors Tour, Q Tour, and other events in the season.

=== World Snooker Tour ===
Start	Finish	Tournament	Venue	Winner	Score	Runner-up	Ref.
10 Jun	3 Jul	Championship League	Leicester Arena in Leicester, England	Ali Carter (ENG)	3‍–‍1	Jackson Page (WAL)	
15 Jul	21 Jul	Shanghai Masters^{†}	Shanghai Grand Stage in Shanghai, China	Judd Trump (ENG)	11‍–‍5	Shaun Murphy (ENG)	
19 Aug	25 Aug	Xi'an Grand Prix	Qujiang E-sports Centre in Xi'an, China	Kyren Wilson (ENG)	10‍–‍8	Judd Trump (ENG)	
30 Aug	7 Sep	Saudi Arabia Masters	The Green Halls in Riyadh, Saudi Arabia	Judd Trump (ENG)	10‍–‍9	Mark Williams (WAL)	
16 Sep	22 Sep	English Open	Brentwood Centre in Brentwood, England	Neil Robertson (AUS)	9‍–‍7	Wu Yize (CHN)	
23 Sep	29 Sep	British Open	The Centaur in Cheltenham, England	Mark Selby (ENG)	10‍–‍5	John Higgins (SCO)	
6 Oct	12 Oct	Wuhan Open	COVCEC in Wuhan, China	Xiao Guodong (CHN)	10‍–‍7	Si Jiahui (CHN)	
20 Oct	27 Oct	Northern Ireland Open	Waterfront Hall in Belfast, Northern Ireland	Kyren Wilson (ENG)	9‍–‍3	Judd Trump (ENG)	
3 Nov	10 Nov	International Championship	SNCNFC in Nanjing, China	Ding Junhui (CHN)	10‍–‍7	Chris Wakelin (ENG)	
11 Nov	17 Nov	Champion of Champions^{†}	Toughsheet Community Stadium in Bolton, England	Mark Williams (WAL)	10‍–‍6	Xiao Guodong (CHN)	
23 Nov	1 Dec	UK Championship	York Barbican in York, England	Judd Trump (ENG)	10‍–‍8	Barry Hawkins (ENG)	
4 Dec	7 Dec	Shoot Out	Leicester Arena in Leicester, England	Tom Ford (ENG)	1‍–‍0	Liam Graham (SCO)	
9 Dec	15 Dec	Scottish Open	Meadowbank Sports Centre in Edinburgh, Scotland	Lei Peifan (CHN)	9‍–‍5	Wu Yize (CHN)	
18 Dec	20 Dec	Riyadh Season Championship^{†}	Boulevard City, Riyadh, Saudi Arabia	Mark Allen (NIR)	5‍–‍1	Luca Brecel (BEL)	
12 Jan	19 Jan	Masters^{†}	Alexandra Palace in London, England	Shaun Murphy (ENG)	10‍–‍7	Kyren Wilson (ENG)	
27 Jan	2 Feb	German Masters	Tempodrom in Berlin, Germany	Kyren Wilson (ENG)	10‍–‍9	Barry Hawkins (ENG)	
3 Jan	5 Feb	Championship League Invitational^{†}	Leicester Arena in Leicester, England	Mark Selby (ENG)	3‍–‍0	Kyren Wilson (ENG)	
10 Feb	16 Feb	Welsh Open	Venue Cymru in Llandudno, Wales	Mark Selby (ENG)	9‍–‍6	Stephen Maguire (SCO)	
23 Feb	1 Mar	World Open	Yushan Sport Centre in Yushan, China	John Higgins (SCO)	10‍–‍6	Joe O'Connor (ENG)	
4 Mar	9 Mar	World Grand Prix	Kai Tak Arena in Kowloon City, Hong Kong	Neil Robertson (AUS)	10‍–‍0	Stuart Bingham (ENG)	
17 Mar	23 Mar	Players Championship	Telford International Centre in Telford, England	Kyren Wilson (ENG)	10‍–‍9	Judd Trump (ENG)	
31 Mar	6 Apr	Tour Championship	Manchester Central in Manchester, England	John Higgins (SCO)	10‍–‍8	Mark Selby (ENG)	
19 Apr	5 May	World Championship	Crucible Theatre in Sheffield, England	Zhao Xintong (CHN)	18‍–‍12	Mark Williams (WAL)	

Ranking event
^{†} Non-ranking event

Home Nations Series champion and Betvictor bonus winner: Neil Robertson (AUS)

=== World Women's Snooker Tour ===
Start	Finish	Tournament	Venue	Winner	Score	Runner-up	Ref.
9 Aug	11 Aug	US Women's Open	OX Billiards in Seattle, United States	Ng On Yee (HKG)	4‍–‍0	Anupama Ramachandran (IND)	
6 Sep	8 Sep	UK Women's Championship	Northern Snooker Centre in Leeds, England	Bai Yulu (CHN)	4‍–‍0	Reanne Evans (ENG)	
5 Oct	8 Oct	Australian Women's Open	Mounties in Sydney, Australia	Mink Nutcharut (THA)	4‍–‍3	Ng On Yee (HKG)	
22 Nov	24 Nov	Women's Masters	Frames Sports Bar in London, England	Reanne Evans (ENG)	4‍–‍3	Mink Nutcharut (THA)	
18 Jan	23 Jan	WSF Women's Championship	Radisson Blu Resort in Saïdia, Morocco	Mink Nutcharut (THA)	4‍–‍3	Bai Yulu (CHN)	
7 Feb	9 Feb	Belgian Women's Open	The Trickshot in Bruges, Belgium	Reanne Evans (ENG)	4‍–‍3	Mink Nutcharut (THA)	
28 Mar	30 Mar	British Women's Open	Landywood Snooker Club in Great Wyrley, England	Ng On Yee (HKG)	4‍–‍3	Mink Nutcharut (THA)	
20 May	27 May	World Women's Championship	Changping Gymnasium in Dongguan, China	Bai Yulu (CHN)	6‍–‍4	Mink Nutcharut (THA)	

=== World Seniors Tour ===
Start	Finish	Tournament	Venue	Winner	Score	Runner-up	Ref.
7 May	11 May	World Seniors Championship	Crucible Theatre in Sheffield, England	Alfie Burden (ENG)	8‍–‍4	Aaron Canavan (JER)	

=== Q Tour ===
Start	Finish	Tournament	Venue	Winner	Score	Runner-up	Ref.
7 Mar	10 Mar	Q Tour Americas 1	H Niteroi Hotel in Rio de Janeiro, Brazil	Igor Figueiredo (BRA)	5‍–‍1	Noel Rodrigues Moreira (BRA)	
21 May	23 May	Q Tour Middle East 1	Bahrain Snooker Academy in Manama, Bahrain	Habib Subah Humood (BHR)	4‍–‍1	Ismail Türker (TUR)	
28 Jun	30 Jun	Q Tour Asia Pacific 1	Pot Black North Perth in Perth, Australia	Vinnie Calabrese (AUS)	5‍–‍4	Ben Foster (AUS)	
19 Jul	21 Jul	Q Tour Middle East 2	Emirates Snooker Academy in Abu Dhabi, United Arab Emirates	Ali Gharahgozlou (IRN)	4‍–‍1	Amin Sanjael (IRN)	
2 Aug	4 Aug	Q Tour Asia Pacific 2	Commercial Club Albury in Albury, Australia	Vinnie Calabrese (AUS)	4‍–‍2	Hassan Kerde (AUS)	
15 Aug	18 Aug	Q Tour Europe 1	Northern Snooker Centre in Leeds, England	Andres Petrov (EST)	4‍–‍3	Ryan Thomerson (AUS)	
20 Sep	22 Sep	Q Tour Europe 2	Bulgarian Snooker Academy in Sofia, Bulgaria	Dylan Emery (WAL)	4‍–‍3	Harvey Chandler (ENG)	
26 Sep	29 Sep	Q Tour Asia Pacific 3	Papatoetoe Cosmopolitan Club in Auckland, New Zealand	Matthew Scarborough (NZL)	6‍–‍3	Lawrence Millington (ENG)	
4 Oct	6 Oct	Q Tour Europe 3	Snookerhallen in Stockholm, Sweden	Zhao Xintong (CHN)	4‍–‍3	Craig Steadman (ENG)	
10 Oct	13 Oct	Q Tour Asia Pacific 4	Mounties Club in Mount Pritchard, Australia	Vinnie Calabrese (AUS)	6‍–‍5	Hassan Kerde (AUS)	
31 Oct	3 Nov	Q Tour Americas 2	H Niteroi Hotel in Rio de Janeiro, Brazil	Claudio Menechini (BRA)	5‍–‍1	Dhiones Moraes Arent (BRA)	
8 Nov	10 Nov	Q Tour Europe 4	Club 200 in Manchester, England	Zhao Xintong (CHN)	4‍–‍2	(England) Ryan Davies	
13 Dec	15 Dec	Q Tour Americas 2	Arizona Snooker Academy in Chandler, Arizona, United States	Andy McCloskey (USA)	4‍–‍2	Ajeya Prabhakar (USA)	
13 Dec	15 Dec	Q Tour Europe 5	National Training Academy in Vienna, Austria	Zhao Xintong (CHN)	4‍–‍2	Ryan Thomerson (AUS)	
10 Jan	12 Jan	Q Tour Europe 6	Delta Moon Snooker Club in Mons, Belgium	Zhao Xintong (CHN)	4‍–‍1	Ehsan Heydari Nezhad (IRN)	
17 Jan	19 Jan	Q Tour Middle East 3	Cue Sports Academy in Abu Dhabi, UAE	Ali Gharahgozlou (IRN)	4‍–‍2	Ismail Türker (TUR)	
18 Jan	19 Jan	Q Tour Americas 3	The Corner Bank in Toronto, Canada	Vito Puopolo (CAN)	5‍–‍0	Inderpal Lotey (CAN)	
24 Jan	27 Jan	Q Tour Asia Pacific 5	Redcliffe Snooker Club in Redcliffe, Australia	Vinnie Calabrese (AUS)	5‍–‍1	Shaun Dalitz (AUS)	
7 Feb	9 Feb	Q Tour Europe 7	Landywood Snooker Club in Walsall, England	Liam Highfield (ENG)	4‍–‍3	Dylan Emery (WAL)	
11 Mar	13 Mar	Q Tour Global Playoff	Pine Beach Belek Hotel in Antalya, Turkey	Steven Hallworth (ENG)	10–5	Mark Joyce (ENG)	
11 Mar	13 Mar	Q Tour Global Playoff	Pine Beach Belek Hotel in Antalya, Turkey	Liam Highfield (ENG)	10–3	Iulian Boiko (UKR)	
11 Mar	13 Mar	Q Tour Global Playoff	Pine Beach Belek Hotel in Antalya, Turkey	Florian Nüßle (AUT)	10–3	Andres Petrov (EST)	

=== Other events ===
Start	Finish	Tournament	Venue	Winner	Score	Runner-up	Ref.
1 Nov	3 Nov	Wels Open	Paul Schopf Snooker Club in Wels, Austria	Florian Nüßle (AUT)	5‍–‍0	Nico Le Clercq (HUN)	
16 May	16 May	Helsinki Super Shoot Out	Kulttuuritalo in Helsinki, Finland	Mark Williams (WAL)	1‍–‍0	Shaun Murphy (ENG)	
17 May	18 May	Helsinki International Cup	Kulttuuritalo in Helsinki, Finland	Mark Allen (NIR)	6‍–‍3	Zhang Anda (CHN)	

== Tournament rankings ==
=== World ranking points ===
The ranking points for reaching different stages of each ranking tournament are listed below.

Round Tournament	R144	R128	R112	R96	R80	R64	R48	R32	R24	R16	R12	QF	R6	SF	F	W
Championship League	—N/a	0 (Note: First stage fourth-placed)	—N/a	1,000 (Note: First stage third-placed)	—N/a	2,000 (Note: First stage runner-up)	—N/a	4,000 (Note: Second stage fourth-placed)	5,000 (Note: Second stage third-placed)	6,000 (Note: Second stage runner-up)	—N/a	8,000 (Note: Third stage fourth-placed)	9,000 (Note: Third stage third-placed)	11,000 (Note: Third stage runner-up)	23,000	33,000
Xi'an Grand Prix	—N/a	0	—N/a	—N/a	—N/a	5,350	—N/a	9,400	—N/a	14,000	—N/a	22,350	—N/a	34,500	76,000	177,000
Saudi Arabia Masters	0	—N/a	4,000 (Note: Players who lose their first match receive no ranking points.)	—N/a	7,000	—N/a	11,000	20,000	—N/a	30,000	—N/a	50,000	—N/a	100,000	200,000	500,000
English Open	—N/a	0	—N/a	1,000	—N/a	3,600	—N/a	5,400	—N/a	9,000	—N/a	13,200	—N/a	21,000	45,000	100,000
British Open	—N/a	0	—N/a	—N/a	—N/a	3,000	—N/a	6,000	—N/a	9,000	—N/a	12,000	—N/a	20,000	45,000	100,000
Wuhan Open	—N/a	0	—N/a	—N/a	—N/a	4,500	—N/a	8,000	—N/a	12,000	—N/a	16,000	—N/a	30,000	63,000	140,000
Northern Ireland Open	—N/a	0	—N/a	1,000	—N/a	3,600	—N/a	5,400	—N/a	9,000	—N/a	13,200	—N/a	21,000	45,000	100,000
International Championship	—N/a	0	—N/a	—N/a	—N/a	5,000	—N/a	9,000	—N/a	14,000	—N/a	22,000	—N/a	33,000	75,000	175,000
UK Championship	0	—N/a	2,500	—N/a	5,000	—N/a	7,500	10,000	—N/a	15,000	—N/a	25,000	—N/a	50,000	100,000	250,000
Shoot Out	—N/a	0	—N/a	—N/a	—N/a	500	—N/a	1,000	—N/a	2,000	—N/a	4,000	—N/a	8,000	20,000	50,000
Scottish Open	—N/a	0	—N/a	1,000	—N/a	3,600	—N/a	5,400	—N/a	9,000	—N/a	13,200	—N/a	21,000	45,000	100,000
German Masters	—N/a	0	—N/a	1,000	—N/a	3,600	—N/a	5,400	—N/a	9,000	—N/a	13,200	—N/a	21,000	45,000	100,000
Welsh Open	—N/a	0	—N/a	1,000	—N/a	3,600	—N/a	5,400	—N/a	9,000	—N/a	13,200	—N/a	21,000	45,000	100,000
World Open	—N/a	0	—N/a	—N/a	—N/a	5,000	—N/a	9,000	—N/a	14,000	—N/a	22,000	—N/a	33,000	75,000	175,000
World Grand Prix	—N/a	—N/a	—N/a	—N/a	—N/a	—N/a	—N/a	10,000	—N/a	15,000	—N/a	20,000	—N/a	35,000	80,000	180,000
Players Championship	—N/a	—N/a	—N/a	—N/a	—N/a	—N/a	—N/a	—N/a	—N/a	15,000	—N/a	20,000	—N/a	35,000	70,000	150,000
Tour Championship	—N/a	—N/a	—N/a	—N/a	—N/a	—N/a	—N/a	—N/a	—N/a	—N/a	20,000	30,000	—N/a	40,000	60,000	150,000
World Championship	0	—N/a	5,000	—N/a	10,000	—N/a	15,000	20,000	—N/a	30,000	—N/a	50,000	—N/a	100,000	200,000	500,000

=== Revision dates and seeding cut-offs ===
The world rankings are updated at specific revision dates following each ranking tournament. On these dates, the ranking points from this season's ranking event are added, while those from two years ago in the 2022–23 snooker season are removed from a player's total. The revision dates are also used for seeding of following ranking events.

Revision point	Date	2024/25 points added	2022/23 points dropped	Seeding cut-off for 2024/25 event
0	2 June 2024	–	–	Championship League, British Open, Shanghai Masters, Xi'an Grand Prix
1	3 July 2024	Championship League	Championship League	Saudi Arabia Masters, Wuhan Open
2	25 August 2024	Xi'an Grand Prix	European Masters	English Open
3	7 September 2024	Saudi Arabia Masters	–	–
4	22 September 2024	English Open	–	Northern Ireland Open, International Championship
5	29 September 2024	British Open	British Open	–
6	12 October 2024	Wuhan Open	–	Scottish Open
7	27 October 2024	Northern Ireland Open	Northern Ireland Open	–
8	10 November 2024	International Championship	–	UK Championship, Shoot Out
9	1 December 2024	UK Championship	UK Championship	Masters, German Masters, World Open, Riyadh Season Championship
10	7 December 2024	Shoot Out	Scottish Open	–
11	15 December 2024	Scottish Open	English Open	Welsh Open
12	2 February 2025	German Masters	World Grand Prix; Shoot Out; German Masters	–
13	16 February 2025	Welsh Open	Welsh Open	World Grand Prix (Note: seeded according to the one-year list)
14	1 March 2025	World Open	Players Championship	–
15	9 March 2025	World Grand Prix	–	Players Championship
16	23 March 2025	Players Championship	WST Classic	Tour Championship
17	6 April 2025	Tour Championship	Tour Championship	World Championship
18	5 May 2025	World Championship	World Championship	–
