= SangSom =

Thai rum

- Official SangSom logo
- Type: Rum
- Manufacturer: SangSom Company (a subsidiary of ThaiBev)
- Distributor: ThaiBev
- Origin: Thailand
- Introduced: 1979
- Alcohol by volume: 40%
- Proof (US): 80
- Colour: Golden-brown
- Flavour: Caramel, vanilla, spice
- Ingredients: Molasses, yeast
- Variants: SangSom Special Rum, SangSom Gold, SangSom Export Edition
- Related products: Mekhong (spirit), Hong Thong (whisky), Blend 285
- Website: www.sangsom.com

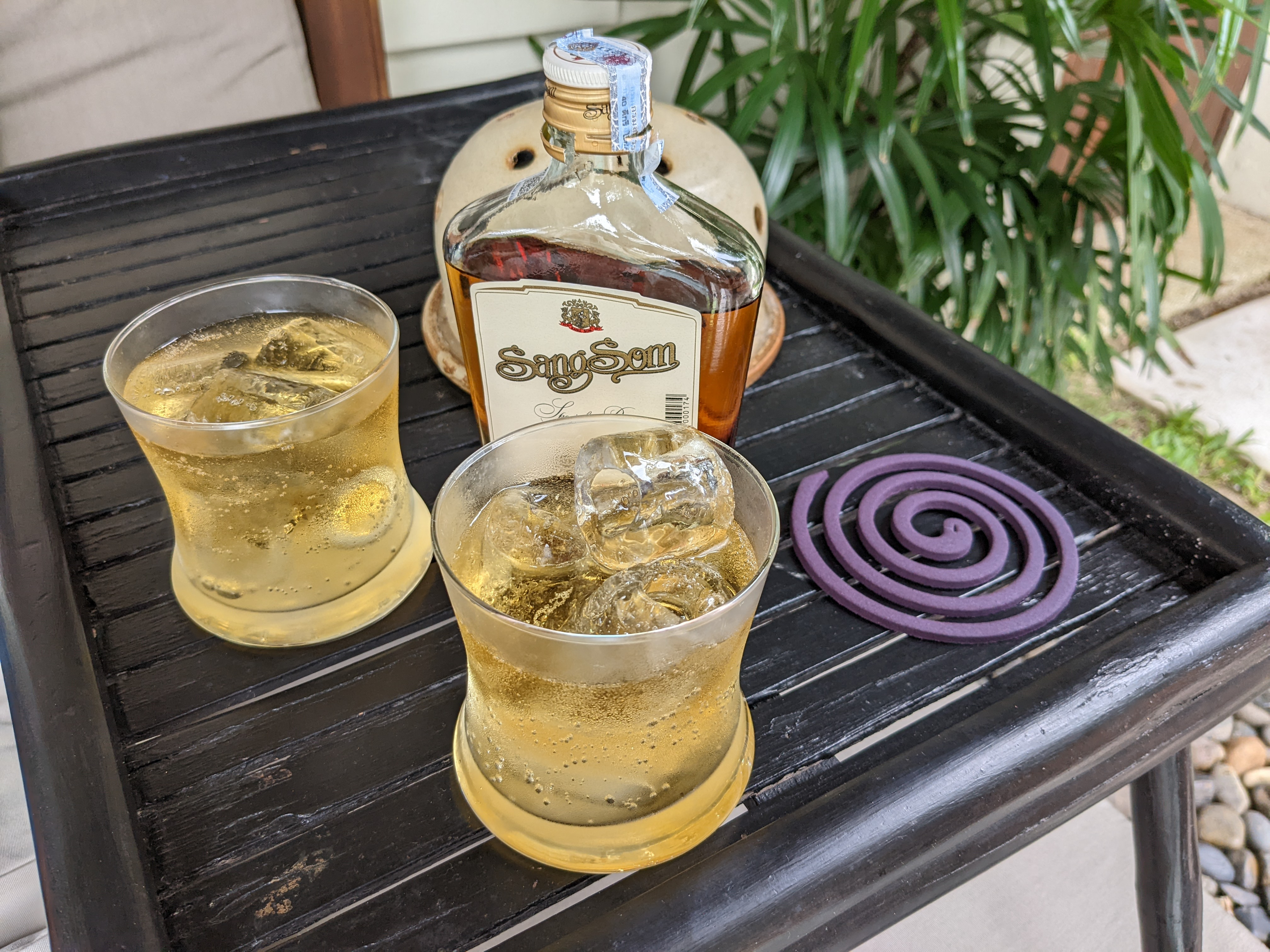
SangSom mixed with soda water

SangSom (Thai: แสงโสม) is a Thai distilled spirit produced since 1979. It is manufactured by SangSom Company, a subsidiary of ThaiBev. Often referred to as a rum-type spirit, SangSom is made primarily from molasses and is one of the most widely consumed alcoholic beverages in Thailand.

== History ==
=== Origins and development ===
SangSom was introduced in 1979 by Thai entrepreneur Niwat Thongthammachart, who aimed to produce a locally made spirit that could compete with imported brands. At the time, imported liquors were considered luxury items, and domestic production was limited. The brand quickly gained popularity due to its affordable price and availability.

=== International recognition ===
During the 1980s, SangSom won several international awards, including gold medals in Madrid (1982 and 1983) and Barcelona (1985). These awards were later referenced on its packaging. While SangSom has been exported, the majority of sales remain domestic, with Thailand accounting for most of its consumption.

=== Cultural role ===
SangSom is commonly consumed across Thailand, in both urban and rural settings. It is often associated with festivals, gatherings, and nightlife in tourist destinations such as Pattaya, Phuket, and Koh Phangan. The drink is well known among foreign visitors, particularly as part of the “buckets” served during the Full Moon Party on Koh Phangan. Its marketing and sale are subject to Thai regulations governing alcohol advertising and distribution.

== Production ==
SangSom is produced from molasses, a by-product of sugarcane processing. Yeast is added to ferment the sugar into alcohol, and the resulting liquid is distilled in column stills. The spirit is then aged in charred oak barrels for approximately five years, which gives it its golden colour and characteristic aroma with notes of caramel and vanilla.

== Characteristics ==
SangSom has a golden-brown appearance and a mild aroma with sweet and woody notes. Its flavour is generally described as smooth, with subtle hints of caramel, vanilla, and spice. It can be consumed neat or mixed with soda water, cola, or water.

== Popularity ==
SangSom has maintained a strong presence in Thailand’s domestic market for several decades. It has held a significant share of the rum category and remains one of the country’s most recognizable alcoholic beverages. Its combination of price and familiarity has contributed to its continued popularity.

== Awards ==
SangSom has received multiple awards at international spirits competitions. Notably, it earned the Gold Medal at events in Madrid (1982 and 1983) and Barcelona (1985). These achievements led to the phrase “SangSom Gold Medal” being used on its labels and marketing materials.

== Packaging ==
SangSom is sold in bottles of various sizes, including 300 ml, 700 ml, and 1 litre. Limited-edition or export versions are occasionally produced. The packaging commonly highlights its award history and production heritage.
