= Six-red snooker =

Cue sport based on snooker

The layout of balls in six-red snooker

Six-red snooker (sometimes spelled six-reds, 6-red, and also known as super 6s), is a variant of snooker, but with only six red balls initially on the table as opposed to the standard fifteen.

== Overview ==
In Six-red snooker, the traditional game of snooker is shortened, with fewer red balls to pot. All the usual Snooker rules apply with the following exceptions:

1. There will be no more than five consecutive Foul and a Miss calls at any one time.
2. After four consecutive Foul and a Miss calls, the referee will warn the offending player that should a Foul and a Miss be called again the following options are available to the non-striker:
  1. play himself from where the balls have come to rest;
  2. ask his opponent to play from where the balls have come to rest;
  3. place the cue ball anywhere on the table, but this option cannot be taken if play has reached the "snookers required" stage.
3. A player cannot snooker behind a nominated colour at any time.

The maximum break in six-red snooker is 75, as compared to 147 for traditional snooker. The table is the same size as in the traditional 15-red game. The format was designed to feature shorter frames, due to fewer red balls.

It was hoped that the format would revive the popularity of snooker as a spectator sport, in the same way Twenty20 has done to cricket. Jimmy White said that six-red snooker could be one way of helping boost the game's popularity. Ali Carter also said he would be interested in playing the format.

The first international tournament in this format was contested in July 2008, with Ricky Walden defeating Stuart Bingham in the final. A six-red tournament was held during the 2009 World Snooker Championship as a sideshow, involving one-frame knockout matches. In the final veteran Tony Knowles defeated 13-year-old Ross Muir 52–18. Tickets were initially free; however, future events would have been pay-to-enter. The first world championship was held in Ireland between 15 and 18 December 2009. Mark Davis beat Mark Williams 6–3 in the final, becoming the first world champion of the six-red snooker format.

Since this time, the Six-red World Championship has been contested in the regular season calendar, and also in the Asian Indoor and Martial arts games.

== Ten-red snooker ==
The layout of balls in ten-red snooker

A similar game consisting of ten red balls, rather than six is also played. Popular in the women's game, ten-red had a World Women's 10-Red Championship held annually in Leeds, England, from 2017 to 2019.

== See also ==
- Six-red World Championship
