= Cue sports at the 2009 Asian Indoor Games =

- Venue: Phan Đình Phùng Gymnasium
- Dates: 31 October – 7 November 2009

Cue sports at the 2009 Asian Indoor Games was held in Phan Đình Phùng Gymnasium, Ho Chi Minh City, Vietnam from 31 October to 7 November 2009.

== Medalists ==
=== Men ===
| Event | Gold | Silver | Bronze |
|---|---|---|---|
| One-cushion singles | Đặng Đình Tiến; Vietnam | Tadashi Machida; Japan | Kim Kyung-roul; South Korea |
| Three-cushion singles | Cho Jae-ho; South Korea | Dương Anh Vũ; Vietnam | Ryuji Umeda; Japan |
| English billiards singles | Praprut Chaithanasakun; Thailand | Peter Gilchrist; Singapore | Pankaj Advani; India |
| Nine-ball singles | Li Hewen; China | Chan Keng Kwang; Singapore | Lu Hui-chan; Chinese Taipei |
| Snooker singles | Jin Long; China | Nader Khan Sultani; Afghanistan | Mohammed Shehab; United Arab Emirates |
| Snooker team | India; Aditya Mehta; Manan Chandra; Brijesh Damani | Qatar; Ahmed Saif; Mohanna Al-Obaidly; Khamis Al-Obaidly | United Arab Emirates; Mohammed Al-Jokar; Mohammed Shehab; Eissa Al-Sayed |
| Six-red snooker singles | Xiao Guodong; China | Liang Wenbo; China | Wu Yu-lun; Chinese Taipei |

=== Women ===
| Event | Gold | Silver | Bronze |
|---|---|---|---|
| Eight-ball singles | Chang Shu-han; Chinese Taipei | Lin Yuan-chun; Chinese Taipei | Fu Xiaofang; China |
| Nine-ball singles | Cha Yu-ram; South Korea | Chihiro Kawahara; Japan | Chang Shu-han; Chinese Taipei |
| Six-red snooker singles | Chen Siming; China | Bi Zhuqing; China | Nicha Pathomekmongkhon; Thailand |

== Medal table ==
| Rank | Nation | Gold | Silver | Bronze | Total |
|---|---|---|---|---|---|
| 1 | China (CHN) | 4 | 2 | 1 | 7 |
| 2 | South Korea (KOR) | 2 | 0 | 1 | 3 |
| 3 | Chinese Taipei (TPE) | 1 | 1 | 3 | 5 |
| 4 | Vietnam (VIE) | 1 | 1 | 0 | 2 |
| 5 | India (IND) | 1 | 0 | 1 | 2 |
| 5 | Thailand (THA) | 1 | 0 | 1 | 2 |
| 7 | Japan (JPN) | 0 | 2 | 1 | 3 |
| 8 | Singapore (SIN) | 0 | 2 | 0 | 2 |
| 9 | Afghanistan (AFG) | 0 | 1 | 0 | 1 |
| 9 | Qatar (QAT) | 0 | 1 | 0 | 1 |
| 11 | United Arab Emirates (UAE) | 0 | 0 | 2 | 2 |
| Totals (11 entries) | | 10 | 10 | 10 | 30 |

== Results ==
=== Men ===
==== One-cushion singles ====
Round of 32 – 2 November
| Udon Khaimuk (THA) | WO | Zozk Saeed (IRQ) |

Round of 16; 2–3 November
Cao Thành Trúc (VIE) | 100
Abdulatif Al-Fawal (QAT) | 5
Cho Jae-ho (KOR) | WO
Hieu Tan Van (LAO)
Fahad Al-Barrak (KSA) | 31
Udon Khaimuk (THA) | 52
Vijay Goel (IND) | 35
Tadashi Machida (JPN) | 100
Yoichiro Mori (JPN) | 100
Ahmed Hasan (IRQ) | 21
Kim Kyung-roul (KOR) | 100
Somxay Xaisana (LAO) | 19
Abdullah Al-Bader (KSA) | 10
Thawat Sujaritthurakarn (THA) | 34
Bashar Hussein (QAT) | 17
Đặng Đình Tiến (VIE) | 100

Quarterfinals; 3–4 November
Cao Thành Trúc (VIE) | 79
Cho Jae-ho (KOR) | 100
Udon Khaimuk (THA) | 46
Tadashi Machida (JPN) | 100
Yoichiro Mori (JPN) | 42
Kim Kyung-roul (KOR) | 100
Thawat Sujaritthurakarn (THA) | 23
Đặng Đình Tiến (VIE) | 100

Semifinals; 4 November
Cho Jae-ho (KOR) | 51
Tadashi Machida (JPN) | 100
Kim Kyung-roul (KOR) | 30
Đặng Đình Tiến (VIE) | 100

Final; 5 November
Tadashi Machida (JPN) | 25
Đặng Đình Tiến (VIE) | 100
Bronze medal match
Cho Jae-ho (KOR) | 80
Kim Kyung-roul (KOR) | 100

==== Three-cushion singles ====
Round of 16; 31 October
Ryuji Umeda (JPN) | 40
Meshari Al-Buqayli (KSA) | 5
Somxay Xaisana (LAO) | 11
Lý Thế Vinh (VIE) | 40
Khamis Al-Obaidly (QAT)
Udon Khaimuk (THA) | WO
Kim Kyung-roul (KOR) | WO
Omar Al-Ajlani (KSA)
Praprut Chaithanasakun (THA) | 11
Joji Kai (JPN) | 40
Hieu Tan Van (LAO) | WO
Yuan Yung-kuo (TPE)
Vijay Goel (IND) | 11
Dương Anh Vũ (VIE) | 40

Quarterfinals; 1 November
Ryuji Umeda (JPN) | 40
Lý Thế Vinh (VIE) | 33
Udon Khaimuk (THA) | 10
Cho Jae-ho (KOR) | 40
Kim Kyung-roul (KOR) | 40
Joji Kai (JPN) | 9
Hieu Tan Van (LAO) | 39
Dương Anh Vũ (VIE) | 40

Semifinals; 1 November
Ryuji Umeda (JPN) | 36
Cho Jae-ho (KOR) | 40
Kim Kyung-roul (KOR) | 28
Dương Anh Vũ (VIE) | 40

Final; 2 November
Cho Jae-ho (KOR) | 40
Dương Anh Vũ (VIE) | 13
Bronze medal match
Ryuji Umeda (JPN) | 40
Kim Kyung-roul (KOR) | 36

==== English billiards singles ====
Round of 32 – 5 November
| Ali Jalil (IRQ) | WO | Nezar Aseeri (KSA) |
| Soriya Minalavong (LAO) | 0–3 | Nguyễn Thanh Long (VIE) |
| Geet Sethi (IND) | 3–0 | Ng Yam Shui (HKG) |
| Zozk Saeed (IRQ) | 3–0 | Imad Al-Ghassani (OMA) |
| Paiboune Sisurat (LAO) | 0–3 | Thawat Sujaritthurakarn (THA) |
| Aung Htay (MYA) | 3–2 | Nguyễn Trung Kiên (VIE) |
| Ahmed Aseeri (KSA) | WO | Lee Chen Man (HKG) |

Round of 16; 5 November
Praprut Chaithanasakun (THA) | 3
Kim Do-hoon (KOR) | 0
Ali Jalil (IRQ) | 3
Abdulmohsin Khamis (QAT) | 0
Nguyễn Thanh Long (VIE) | 0
Geet Sethi (IND) | 3
Hamood Al-Harthy (OMA) | 0
Kyaw Oo (MYA) | 3
Peter Gilchrist (SIN) | 3
Zozk Saeed (IRQ) | 0
Thawat Sujaritthurakarn (THA) | 3
Aung Htay (MYA) | 0
Mohanna Al-Obaidly (QAT) | 0
Lee Chen Man (HKG) | 3
Hwang Chul-ho (KOR) | 0
Pankaj Advani (IND) | 3

Quarterfinals; 5 November
Praprut Chaithanasakun (THA) | 3
Ali Jalil (IRQ) | 0
Geet Sethi (IND) | 1
Kyaw Oo (MYA) | 3
Peter Gilchrist (SIN) | 3
Thawat Sujaritthurakarn (THA) | 2
Lee Chen Man (HKG) | 0
Pankaj Advani (IND) | 3

Semifinals; 6 November
Praprut Chaithanasakun (THA) | 3
Kyaw Oo (MYA) | 0
Peter Gilchrist (SIN) | 3
Pankaj Advani (IND) | 1

Final; 6 November
Praprut Chaithanasakun (THA) | 3
Peter Gilchrist (SIN) | 2
Bronze medal match
Kyaw Oo (MYA) | 0
Pankaj Advani (IND) | 3

==== Nine-ball singles ====
Round of 64 – 31 October
| Chan Keng Kwang (SIN) | 9–4 | Kim Woong-dae (KOR) |
| Phonpaseuth Inthavong (LAO) | 6–9 | Bewi Simanjuntak (INA) |
| Salaheldeen Hussein (UAE) | 9–3 | Muhammad Zulfikri (INA) |
| Surathep Phoochalam (THA) | 9–7 | Lkhagvabazaryn Mönkhbold (MGL) |
| Bader Al-Awadhi (KUW) | WO | Toh Lian Han (SIN) |

Round of 32 – 1 November
| Fu Jianbo (CHN) | 9–2 | Bashar Hussein (QAT) |
| Ismail Yaqoob (UAE) | 9–7 | Ahmed Aboukhshaba (KSA) |
| Alok Kumar (IND) | 5–9 | Chan Keng Kwang (SIN) |
| Rajen Lama (NEP) | 4–9 | Ayhab Hasan (IRQ) |
| Ibrahim Shareef (MDV) | 2–9 | Yang Ching-shun (TPE) |
| Bewi Simanjuntak (INA) | 9–1 | Al-Muhtadee Billah (BRU) |
| Abdullah Al-Yousef (KUW) | 2–9 | Naoyuki Oi (JPN) |
| Nguyễn Anh Tuấn (VIE) | 3–9 | Nitiwat Kanjanasri (THA) |
| Jeong Young-hwa (KOR) | 5–9 | Li Hewen (CHN) |
| Nayef Al-Jawini (KSA) | 5–9 | Salaheldeen Hussein (UAE) |
| Abdulatif Al-Fawal (QAT) | 6–9 | Surathep Phoochalam (THA) |
| Saroj Kumar Mulmi (NEP) | 9–6 | Ali Nasih (MDV) |
| Ali Sabri (IRQ) | 6–9 | Rafath Habib (IND) |
| Lee Chen Man (HKG) | 9–4 | Phonepadid Vonghsomboune (LAO) |
| Lu Hui-chan (TPE) | 9–2 | Toh Lian Han (SIN) |
| Hisashi Kusano (JPN) | 5–9 | Nguyễn Phúc Long (VIE) |

Round of 16; 2 November
Fu Jianbo (CHN) | 9
Ismail Yaqoob (UAE) | 3
Chan Keng Kwang (SIN) | 9
Ayhab Hasan (IRQ) | 7
Yang Ching-shun (TPE) | 9
Bewi Simanjuntak (INA) | 7
Naoyuki Oi (JPN) | 9
Nitiwat Kanjanasri (THA) | 5
Li Hewen (CHN) | 9
Salaheldeen Hussein (UAE) | 6
Surathep Phoochalam (THA) | 9
Saroj Kumar Mulmi (NEP) | 1
Rafath Habib (IND) | 6
Lee Chen Man (HKG) | 9
Lu Hui-chan (TPE) | 9
Nguyễn Phúc Long (VIE) | 5

Quarterfinals; 2 November
Fu Jianbo (CHN) | 8
Chan Keng Kwang (SIN) | 9
Yang Ching-shun (TPE) | 9
Naoyuki Oi (JPN) | 4
Li Hewen (CHN) | 9
Surathep Phoochalam (THA) | 3
Lee Chen Man (HKG) | 2
Lu Hui-chan (TPE) | 9

Semifinals; 2 November
Chan Keng Kwang (SIN) | 9
Yang Ching-shun (TPE) | 8
Li Hewen (CHN) | 9
Lu Hui-chan (TPE) | 6

Final; 3 November
Chan Keng Kwang (SIN) | 7
Li Hewen (CHN) | 9
Bronze medal match
Yang Ching-shun (TPE) | 7
Lu Hui-chan (TPE) | 9

==== Snooker singles ====
Round of 64 – 2 November
| Marvin Lim (SIN) | 4–0 | Shyam Khadgi (NEP) |
| Ismail Suwaidh (MDV) | 0–4 | Hwang Chul-ho (KOR) |
| Saleh Mohammad (AFG) | 4–2 | Siththideth Sakbieng (LAO) |
| Nezar Aseeri (KSA) | 1–4 | Sadiq Al-Farsi (OMA) |
| Au Chi Wai (HKG) | 2–4 | Pankaj Advani (IND) |
| Ahmed Al-Khusaibi (OMA) | 2–4 | Vong Tat Keong (MAC) |
| Hussein Jafar (IRQ) | 4–3 | Anas Al-Marzouki (SYR) |
| Mohammed Al-Jokar (UAE) | 2–4 | Kim Do-hoon (KOR) |
| Ahmed Ghulum (BRN) | 0–4 | Manan Chandra (IND) |
| Ang Boon Chin (SIN) | 2–4 | Nader Khan Sultani (AFG) |
| Ahmed Aseeri (KSA) | 4–1 | Daophachanh Phouthabandid (LAO) |
| Tüvshinjargalyn Khash-Ochir (MGL) | WO | Abdullah Al-Kandari (KUW) |

Round of 32 – 3 November
| Mohammed Shehab (UAE) | 4–0 | Si Tou Chong Wut (MAC) |
| Marvin Lim (SIN) | 4–1 | Ali Abdul-Mohsin (IRQ) |
| Yusuke Tanaka (JPN) | 1–4 | Hwang Chul-ho (KOR) |
| Omar Al-Kojah (SYR) | 4–3 | Mohanna Al-Obaidly (QAT) |
| Saleh Mohammad (AFG) | 1–4 | Supoj Saenla (THA) |
| Sadiq Al-Farsi (OMA) | 3–4 | Phạm Hoài Nam (VIE) |
| Husain Mahmood (BRN) | 2–4 | Pankaj Advani (IND) |
| Meqdad Taqi (KUW) | 0–4 | Jin Long (CHN) |
| Liang Wenbo (CHN) | 4–0 | Vong Tat Keong (MAC) |
| Hussein Jafar (IRQ) | 4–0 | Mohamed Wildhan (MDV) |
| Saroj Kumar Mulmi (NEP) | 3–4 | Kim Do-hoon (KOR) |
| Ahmed Saif (QAT) | 3–4 | Manan Chandra (IND) |
| Atsushi Endo (JPN) | 0–4 | Nader Khan Sultani (AFG) |
| Ahmed Aseeri (KSA) | 4–3 | Đỗ Hoàng Quân (VIE) |
| Fung Kwok Wai (HKG) | 4–0 | Tüvshinjargalyn Khash-Ochir (MGL) |
| Wu Yu-lun (TPE) | 4–1 | Thepchaiya Un-Nooh (THA) |

Round of 16; 3 November
Mohammed Shehab (UAE) | 4
Marvin Lim (SIN) | 2
Hwang Chul-ho (KOR) | 0
Omar Al-Kojah (SYR) | 4
Supoj Saenla (THA) | 4
Phạm Hoài Nam (VIE) | 0
Pankaj Advani (IND) | 3
Jin Long (CHN) | 4
Liang Wenbo (CHN) | 4
Hussein Jafar (IRQ) | 1
Kim Do-hoon (KOR) | 1
Manan Chandra (IND) | 4
Nader Khan Sultani (AFG) | 4
Ahmed Aseeri (KSA) | 0
Fung Kwok Wai (HKG) | 3
Wu Yu-lun (TPE) | 4

Quarterfinals; 3 November
Mohammed Shehab (UAE) | 4
Omar Al-Kojah (SYR) | 2
Supoj Saenla (THA) | 2
Jin Long (CHN) | 4
Liang Wenbo (CHN) | 0
Manan Chandra (IND) | 4
Nader Khan Sultani (AFG) | 4
Wu Yu-lun (TPE) | 2

Semifinals; 4 November
Mohammed Shehab (UAE) | 1
Jin Long (CHN) | 4
Manan Chandra (IND) | 3
Nader Khan Sultani (AFG) | 4

Final; 4 November
Jin Long (CHN) | 4
Nader Khan Sultani (AFG) | 0
Bronze medal match
Mohammed Shehab (UAE) | 4
Manan Chandra (IND) | 2

==== Snooker team ====
Round of 32 – 6 November
| Bahrain | 3–0 | Syria |
| Singapore | 3–2 | Thailand |
| Maldives | WO | Iraq |
| Oman | 2–3 | Macau |

Round of 16; 6 November
Hong Kong | 2
Qatar | 3
Bahrain | 1
Laos | 3
Kuwait | 2
Singapore | 3
Saudi Arabia | 3
Nepal | 2
India | 3
South Korea | 1
Iraq | 0
Vietnam | 3
Japan | 1
Macau | 3
United Arab Emirates | 3
China | 2

Quarterfinals; 6 November
Qatar | 3
Laos | 2
Singapore | 3
Saudi Arabia | 0
India | 3
Vietnam | 2
Macau | 0
United Arab Emirates | 3

Semifinals; November 7
Qatar | 3
Singapore | 2
India | 3
United Arab Emirates | 0

Final; November 7
Qatar | 0
India | 3
Bronze medal match
Singapore | 2
United Arab Emirates | 3

==== Six-red snooker singles ====
Round of 64 – 31 October
| Hassan Al-Harthy (OMA) | 3–5 | Au Chi Wai (HKG) |
| Nezar Aseeri (KSA) | 1–5 | Thepchaiya Un-Nooh (THA) |

Round of 32 – 31 October
| Ali Jalil (IRQ) | 0–5 | Xiao Guodong (CHN) |
| Supoj Saenla (THA) | 5–1 | Omar Al-Kojah (SYR) |
| Hwang Chul-ho (KOR) | 3–5 | Mohammed Al-Jokar (UAE) |
| Siththideth Sakbieng (LAO) | 2–5 | Ahmed Saif (QAT) |
| Yusuke Tanaka (JPN) | 1–5 | Ang Boon Chin (SIN) |
| Au Chi Wai (HKG) | 5–2 | Phạm Hoài Nam (VIE) |
| Sulaiman Al-Misfer (KSA) | 2–5 | Manan Chandra (IND) |
| Tüvshinjargalyn Khash-Ochir (MGL) | 5–1 | Si Tou Chong Wut (MAC) |
| Liang Wenbo (CHN) | 5–1 | Ahmed Hasan (IRQ) |
| Marvin Lim (SIN) | 5–1 | Yousuf Al-Foori (OMA) |
| Chan Kwok Ming (HKG) | 5–4 | Thepchaiya Un-Nooh (THA) |
| Eissa Al-Sayed (UAE) | 5–2 | Abdulmohsin Khamis (QAT) |
| Daophachanh Phouthabandid (LAO) | WO | Đỗ Hoàng Quân (VIE) |
| Shuji Hase (JPN) | 1–5 | Pankaj Advani (IND) |
| Haitham Khalil (SYR) | 4–5 | Kim Do-hoon (KOR) |
| Vong Tat Keong (MAC) | 0–5 | Wu Yu-lun (TPE) |

Round of 16; 31 October
Xiao Guodong (CHN) | 5
Supoj Saenla (THA) | 4
Mohammed Al-Jokar (UAE) | 3
Ahmed Saif (QAT) | 5
Ang Boon Chin (SIN) | 1
Au Chi Wai (HKG) | 5
Manan Chandra (IND) | 5
Tüvshinjargalyn Khash-Ochir (MGL) | 1
Liang Wenbo (CHN) | 5
Marvin Lim (SIN) | 0
Chan Kwok Ming (HKG) | 5
Eissa Al-Sayed (UAE) | 2
Đỗ Hoàng Quân (VIE) | 5
Pankaj Advani (IND) | 3
Kim Do-hoon (KOR) | 3
Wu Yu-lun (TPE) | 5

Quarterfinals; 1 November
Xiao Guodong (CHN) | 5
Ahmed Saif (QAT) | 0
Au Chi Wai (HKG) | 3
Manan Chandra (IND) | 5
Liang Wenbo (CHN) | 5
Chan Kwok Ming (HKG) | 2
Đỗ Hoàng Quân (VIE) | 3
Wu Yu-lun (TPE) | 5

Semifinals; 1 November
Xiao Guodong (CHN) | 5
Manan Chandra (IND) | 4
Liang Wenbo (CHN) | 5
Wu Yu-lun (TPE) | 4

Final; 1 November
Xiao Guodong (CHN) | 5
Liang Wenbo (CHN) | 2
Bronze medal match
Manan Chandra (IND) | 1
Wu Yu-lun (TPE) | 5

=== Women ===
==== Eight-ball singles ====
Round of 32 – 3 November
| Battulgyn Uyanga (MGL) | 2–5 | Angeline Ticoalu (INA) |
| Chen Xue (CHN) | 5–3 | Cha Yu-ram (KOR) |
| Charlene Chai (SIN) | 5–2 | Meenal Thakur (IND) |
| Chang Shu-han (TPE) | 5–1 | Amy Hoe (SIN) |
| Anuja Chandra (IND) | 4–5 | Dương Thúy Vi (VIE) |

Round of 16; 4 November
Lin Yuan-chun (TPE) | 5
Viengsavanh Phommakong (LAO) | 1
Angeline Ticoalu (INA) | 5
Ngô Thị Kim Phượng (VIE) | 2
Chen Xue (CHN) | 3
Charlene Chai (SIN) | 5
Santhinee Jaisuekul (THA) | 2
Chihiro Kawahara (JPN) | 5
Miyuki Fuke (JPN) | WO
Suvandith Sengdouangsydy (LAO)
Chang Shu-han (TPE) | 5
Dương Thúy Vi (VIE) | 1
Fu Xiaofang (CHN) | 5
Sri Wahyuni (INA) | 0
Kim Ga-young (KOR) | 5
Kampa Tala (THA) | 0

Quarterfinals; 4 November
Lin Yuan-chun (TPE) | 5
Angeline Ticoalu (INA) | 2
Charlene Chai (SIN) | 3
Chihiro Kawahara (JPN) | 5
Miyuki Fuke (JPN) | 0
Chang Shu-han (TPE) | 5
Fu Xiaofang (CHN) | 5
Kim Ga-young (KOR) | 2

Semifinals; 5 November
Lin Yuan-chun (TPE) | 5
Chihiro Kawahara (JPN) | 4
Chang Shu-han (TPE) | 5
Fu Xiaofang (CHN) | 2

Final; 5 November
Lin Yuan-chun (TPE) | 0
Chang Shu-han (TPE) | 5
Bronze medal match
Chihiro Kawahara (JPN) | 2
Fu Xiaofang (CHN) | 5

==== Nine-ball singles ====
Round of 32 – 5 November
| Angeline Ticoalu (INA) | 7–4 | Battulgyn Uyanga (MGL) |
| Pan Xiaoting (CHN) | 7–2 | Dương Thúy Vi (VIE) |
| Miyuki Fuke (JPN) | WO | Suvandith Sengdouangsydy (LAO) |
| Fu Xiaofang (CHN) | 7–6 | Fanny Lestari (INA) |
| Vương Thị Thu Bình (VIE) | 2–7 | Chihiro Kawahara (JPN) |

Round of 16; 6 November
Lin Yuan-chun (TPE) | 3
Cha Yu-ram (KOR) | 7
Angeline Ticoalu (INA) | 7
Meenal Thakur (IND) | 2
Pan Xiaoting (CHN) | 5
Miyuki Fuke (JPN) | 7
Amy Hoe (SIN) | 5
Nicha Pathomekmongkhon (THA) | 7
Charlene Chai (SIN) | 7
Indira Gowda (IND) | 3
Chang Shu-han (TPE) | 7
Fu Xiaofang (CHN) | 4
Santhinee Jaisuekul (THA) | 3
Chihiro Kawahara (JPN) | 7
Viengsavanh Phommakong (LAO) | 2
Kim Ga-young (KOR) | 7

Quarterfinals; 6 November
Cha Yu-ram (KOR) | 7
Angeline Ticoalu (INA) | 2
Miyuki Fuke (JPN) | 7
Nicha Pathomekmongkhon (THA) | 3
Charlene Chai (SIN) | 2
Chang Shu-han (TPE) | 7
Chihiro Kawahara (JPN) | 7
Kim Ga-young (KOR) | 3

Semifinals; 6 November
Cha Yu-ram (KOR) | 7
Miyuki Fuke (JPN) | 2
Chang Shu-han (TPE) | 4
Chihiro Kawahara (JPN) | 7

Final; November 7
Cha Yu-ram (KOR) | 7
Chihiro Kawahara (JPN) | 4
Bronze medal match
Miyuki Fuke (JPN) | 4
Chang Shu-han (TPE) | 7

==== Six-red snooker singles ====
Round of 32 – 1 November
| Nada Abdullah (SYR) | 0–4 | Chen Siming (CHN) |
| Kim Ga-young (KOR) | 3–4 | Vidya Pillai (IND) |

Round of 16; 1 November
Suvandith Sengdouangsydy (LAO)
Nicha Pathomekmongkhon (THA) | WO
Cha Yu-ram (KOR) | 2
Amy Hoe (SIN) | 4
Chen Siming (CHN) | 4
Chitra Magimairaj (IND) | 3
Jaique Ip (HKG) | 3
Đoàn Thị Ngọc Lệ (VIE) | 4
Viengsavanh Phommakong (LAO) | 1
Santhinee Jaisuekul (THA) | 4
Charlene Chai (SIN) | 1
Yu Ching Ching (HKG) | 4
Bi Zhuqing (CHN) | 4
Vidya Pillai (IND) | 1
Liu Shin-mei (TPE) | 4
Ngô Thị Kim Phượng (VIE) | 0

Quarterfinals; 1 November
Nicha Pathomekmongkhon (THA) | 4
Amy Hoe (SIN) | 3
Chen Siming (CHN) | 4
Đoàn Thị Ngọc Lệ (VIE) | 3
Santhinee Jaisuekul (THA) | 2
Yu Ching Ching (HKG) | 4
Bi Zhuqing (CHN) | 4
Liu Shin-mei (TPE) | 1

Semifinals; 2 November
Nicha Pathomekmongkhon (THA) | 0
Chen Siming (CHN) | 4
Yu Ching Ching (HKG) | 0
Bi Zhuqing (CHN) | 4

Final; 2 November
Chen Siming (CHN) | 4
Bi Zhuqing (CHN) | 1
Bronze medal match
Nicha Pathomekmongkhon (THA) | 4
Yu Ching Ching (HKG) | 0
