= Indoor athletics at the 2009 Asian Indoor Games =

- Venue: Hanoi Indoor Games Gymnasium
- Dates: 31 October – 2 November 2009

Indoor athletics at the 2009 Asian Indoor Games was held in Hanoi Indoor Games Gymnasium, Hanoi, Vietnam from 31 October to 2 November 2009.

On the first day of competition youth beat out experience in the 60 metres races: representing the host nation, Vietnam's Vũ Thị Hương set a personal best to edge veteran Guzel Khubbieva to the women's gold, and 20-year-old Su Bingtian also ran a personal best to win the men's race. Chinese athlete Li Ling won the women's pole vault by almost half a metre (her mark of 4.45 m just one centimetre off the Asian record). Liu Qing won China's third gold of the day in the 1500 metres, just beating Bahrain's Mimi Belete, while Iran took their first athletics gold of the Games when Leila Rajabi scored an indoor best in the shot put.

China, Kazakhstan and Saudi Arabia each picked up two golds on the second day. Ji Wei's 7.69 seconds in the 60 metre hurdles was a Games record and compatriot Chen Jingwen took gold in the 400 metres. For Kazakhstan, Asian record holder Olga Rypakova was unmatched in the triple jump but Vitaliy Tsykunov only just took the gold in the high jump, beating Syria's Majdeddin Ghazal on count-back. Saudis Ahmed Faiz and Ismail Al-Sabiani won close contests in the long jump and 400 m competitions, while another Games record came in the 3000 metres, with James Kwalia from Qatar taking the victory.

A total of 13 events were brought to a close on the third and final day of the athletics competition, with new Games records coming in all but the women’s 3000 m and relay race. Golds for Olga Rypakova, Margarita Matsko, Roman Valiyev and the relay team assured first place in the medals for Kazakhstan. The high jump was again won on countback, as Noengrothai Chaipetch was edged out by Uzbekistan's Nadiya Dusanova. Her compatriot Leonid Andreev set an indoor best of 5.60 m to win the pole vault. China took just one medal on the last day, but Iran raised their gold count to three through shot putter Amin Nikfar and 800 m runner Sajjad Moradi. Mohammed Al-Qaree upset Olympic medallist Dmitriy Karpov in the heptathlon, Wallapa Punsoongneun beat reigning champion Natalya Ivoninskaya in the hurdles, and Thamer Kamal Ali made it two golds for Qatar in the 1500 metres.

== Medalists ==
=== Men ===
Event	Gold		Silver		Bronze	
60 m	Su Bingtian; China	6.65	Yasir Al-Nashiri; Saudi Arabia	6.66	Wachara Sondee; Thailand	6.68
400 m	Ismail Al-Sabiani; Saudi Arabia	47.31	Yousef Masrahi; Saudi Arabia	47.49	Sergey Zaikov; Kazakhstan	47.63
800 m	Sajjad Moradi; Iran	1:48.48; GR	Mohammad Al-Azemi; Kuwait	1:48.93	Adnan Taess; Iraq	1:49.59
1500 m	Thamer Kamal Ali; Qatar	3:42.36; GR	Alemu Bekele; Bahrain	3:43.66	Abubaker Ali Kamal; Qatar	3:44.07
3000 m	James Kwalia; Qatar	8:00.40; GR	Alemu Bekele; Bahrain	8:01.50	Essa Ismail Rashed; Qatar	8:05.87
60 m hurdles	Ji Wei; China	7.69; GR	Mohamed Issa Al-Thawadi; Qatar	7.81	Sami Al-Haydar; Saudi Arabia	7.81
4 × 400 m relay	Saudi Arabia; Yousef Masrahi; Ismail Al-Sabiani; Hamed Al-Bishi; Bandar Sharahili	3:10.31; GR	Thailand; Chanatip Ruckburee; Jukkatip Pojaroen; Supachai Phachsay; Suppachai Chimdee	3:11.07	United Arab Emirates; Omar Juma Al-Salfa; Ali Shirook; Saud Abdelkarim; Jasim Saeed	3:11.40
High jump	Vitaliy Tsykunov; Kazakhstan	2.22	Majdeddin Ghazal; Syria	2.22	Zhao Kuansong; China	2.20
Pole vault	Leonid Andreev; Uzbekistan	5.60; GR	Yang Yansheng; China	5.40	Kreeta Sintawacheewa; Thailand	5.10
Long jump	Ahmed Faiz; Saudi Arabia	7.96; GR	Zhuang Haitao; China	7.91	Theerayut Philakong; Thailand	7.71
Triple jump	Roman Valiyev; Kazakhstan	16.60; GR	Yevgeniy Ektov; Kazakhstan	16.44	Theerayut Philakong; Thailand	16.05
Shot put	Amin Nikfar; Iran	19.66; GR	Chang Ming-huang; Chinese Taipei	19.55	Sultan Al-Hebshi; Saudi Arabia	19.39
Heptathlon	Mohammed Al-Qaree; Saudi Arabia	5791; GR	Dmitriy Karpov; Kazakhstan	5691	Vũ Văn Huyện; Vietnam	5622

=== Women ===
Event	Gold		Silver		Bronze	
60 m	Vũ Thị Hương; Vietnam	7.24; GR	Guzel Khubbieva; Uzbekistan	7.39	Nongnuch Sanrat; Thailand	7.42
400 m	Chen Jingwen; China	53.58	Gulustan Mahmood; Iraq	53.75	Marina Maslyonko; Kazakhstan	54.34
800 m	Margarita Matsko; Kazakhstan	2:03.06; GR	Trương Thanh Hằng; Vietnam	2:03.65	Viktoriya Yalovtseva; Kazakhstan	2:03.74
1500 m	Liu Qing; China	4:19.04	Mimi Belete; Bahrain	4:19.79	Trương Thanh Hằng; Vietnam	4:23.04
3000 m	Tejitu Daba; Bahrain	9:32.65	Bùi Thị Hiền; Vietnam	9:37.19	Gladys Kibiwot; Bahrain	9:42.64
60 m hurdles	Wallapa Pansoongneun; Thailand	8.28; GR	Natalya Ivoninskaya; Kazakhstan	8.38	Anastassiya Soprunova; Kazakhstan	8.39
4 × 400 m relay	Kazakhstan; Viktoriya Yalovtseva; Margarita Matsko; Marina Maslyonko; Anna Gavriushenko	3:39.21	India; Mrudula Korada; Jauna Murmu; Tiana Mary Thomas; Ashwini Akkunji	3:41.23	Thailand; Achara Chanakhen; Karat Srimuang; Saowalee Kaewchuay; Treewadee Yongphan	3:41.37
High jump	Nadiya Dusanova; Uzbekistan	1.93; GR	Noengrothai Chaipetch; Thailand	1.93; GR	Wanida Boonwan; Thailand	1.91
Pole vault	Li Ling; China	4.45; GR	Lê Thị Phương; Vietnam	4.00	Ni Putu Desi Margawati; Indonesia	4.00
Long jump	Olga Rypakova; Kazakhstan	6.58; GR	Yuliya Tarasova; Uzbekistan	6.45	M. A. Prajusha; India	6.27
Triple jump	Olga Rypakova; Kazakhstan	14.40; GR	Irina Litvinenko; Kazakhstan	13.87	Thitima Muangjan; Thailand	13.78
Shot put	Leila Rajabi; Iran	17.07	Juttaporn Krasaeyan; Thailand	16.12	Lin Chia-ying; Chinese Taipei	16.08
Pentathlon	Wassana Winatho; Thailand	4062	Liu Haili; China	3908	Nguyễn Thị Thu Cúc; Vietnam	3765

== Medal table ==
Rank	Nation	Gold	Silver	Bronze	Total
1	Kazakhstan (KAZ)	6	4	4	14
2	China (CHN)	5	3	1	9
3	Saudi Arabia (KSA)	4	2	2	8
4	Iran (IRI)	3	0	0	3
5	Thailand (THA)	2	3	8	13
6	Uzbekistan (UZB)	2	2	0	4
7	Qatar (QAT)	2	1	2	5
8	Vietnam (VIE)	1	3	3	7
9	Bahrain (BRN)	1	3	1	5
10	Chinese Taipei (TPE)	0	1	1	2
10	India (IND)	0	1	1	2
10	Iraq (IRQ)	0	1	1	2
13	Kuwait (KUW)	0	1	0	1
13	Syria (SYR)	0	1	0	1
15	Indonesia (INA)	0	0	1	1
15	United Arab Emirates (UAE)	0	0	1	1
Totals (16 entries)		26	26	26	78

== Results ==
=== Men ===
==== 60 m ====
31 October

===== Round 1 =====
Rank	Athlete	Time
Heat 1
1	Wachara Sondee (THA)	6.79
2	Yahya Al-Ghahes (KSA)	6.79
3	Omar Juma Al-Salfa (UAE)	6.80
4	Leung Chun Wai (HKG)	6.85
5	Thamir Nasser Thani (QAT)	6.94
6	Hareth Mohammed (IRQ)	7.25
—	Salem Al-Qaifi (YEM)	DNS
Heat 2
1	Yasir Al-Nashiri (KSA)	6.73
2	Samuel Francis (QAT)	6.82
3	Aleksandr Zolotuhin (KGZ)	6.93
4	Kinga Thinley (BHU)	7.64
5	Ibrahim Abdul Sattar (MDV)	7.96
—	Igor Khan (TJK)	DNS
—	Amir Piaho (IRI)	DNS
Heat 3
1	Su Bingtian (CHN)	6.74
2	Mohamed Farhan (BRN)	6.82
3	Tu Chia-lin (TPE)	6.83
4	Apinan Sukaphai (THA)	6.93
5	Park Jong-hyeok (KOR)	7.04
6	Saleh Al-Haddad (KUW)	7.04
7	Waleed Anwari (AFG)	7.47
Heat 4
1	Ashan Hasaranga (SRI)	6.79
2	Nguyễn Văn Mùa (VIE)	6.80
3	Humoud Al-Saad (KUW)	7.00
4	Pao Hin Fong (MAC)	7.08
5	Chaleunsouk Oudomphanh (LAO)	7.12
6	Masoud Azizi (AFG)	7.25
—	Amiya Kumar Mallick (IND)	DSQ

===== Semifinals =====
Rank	Athlete	Time
Heat 1
1	Su Bingtian (CHN)	6.73
2	Yahya Al-Ghahes (KSA)	6.77
3	Mohamed Farhan (BRN)	6.78
4	Tu Chia-lin (TPE)	6.79
5	Nguyễn Văn Mùa (VIE)	6.83
6	Apinan Sukaphai (THA)	6.91
7	Aleksandr Zolotuhin (KGZ)	6.94
8	Thamir Nasser Thani (QAT)	6.99
Heat 2
1	Yasir Al-Nashiri (KSA)	6.68
2	Wachara Sondee (THA)	6.71
3	Omar Juma Al-Salfa (UAE)	6.76
4	Leung Chun Wai (HKG)	6.82
5	Ashan Hasaranga (SRI)	6.83
6	Humoud Al-Saad (KUW)	7.09
—	Park Jong-hyeok (KOR)	DNS
—	Samuel Francis (QAT)	DNS

===== Final =====
Rank	Athlete	Time
1st place, gold medalist(s)	Su Bingtian (CHN)	6.65
2nd place, silver medalist(s)	Yasir Al-Nashiri (KSA)	6.66
3rd place, bronze medalist(s)	Wachara Sondee (THA)	6.68
4	Omar Juma Al-Salfa (UAE)	6.72
5	Tu Chia-lin (TPE)	6.78
6	Mohamed Farhan (BRN)	6.79
7	Yahya Al-Ghahes (KSA)	6.81
8	Leung Chun Wai (HKG)	6.83

==== 400 m ====
===== Round 1 =====
31 October

Rank	Athlete	Time
Heat 1
1	Yousef Masrahi (KSA)	47.70
2	Sergey Zaikov (KAZ)	48.33
3	Ali Shirook (UAE)	48.99
4	Mohammed Hasan (IRQ)	49.01
—	Abdullah Al-Hidi (OMA)	DNS
Heat 2
1	Ismail Al-Sabiani (KSA)	48.37
2	Karrar Abdul-Zahra (IRQ)	49.05
3	Artem Dyatlov (UZB)	49.30
—	Masoud Azizi (AFG)	DNF
—	Salem Al-Qaifi (YEM)	DNS
Heat 3
1	Reza Bouazar (IRI)	48.44
2	Wang Youxin (CHN)	49.12
3	Supachai Phachsay (THA)	49.28
4	Saud Abdelkarim (UAE)	49.29
—	Wadhah Al-Sakkaf (YEM)	DNS
Heat 4
1	Chanatip Ruckburee (THA)	49.18
2	Sudesh Mudunegedara (SRI)	49.38
3	Fawzi Al-Shammari (KUW)	51.06
4	Khenmanh Chantavong (LAO)	51.70
5	Waleed Anwari (AFG)	52.74

===== Semifinals =====
1 November

Rank	Athlete	Time
Heat 1
1	Yousef Masrahi (KSA)	47.95
2	Sergey Zaikov (KAZ)	48.26
3	Ali Shirook (UAE)	48.83
4	Chanatip Ruckburee (THA)	48.83
5	Sudesh Mudunegedara (SRI)	49.34
6	Mohammed Hasan (IRQ)	49.70
Heat 2
1	Ismail Al-Sabiani (KSA)	47.85
2	Reza Bouazar (IRI)	47.94
3	Saud Abdelkarim (UAE)	48.92
4	Wang Youxin (CHN)	49.26
5	Supachai Phachsay (THA)	49.27
6	Karrar Abdul-Zahra (IRQ)	49.70

===== Final =====
1 November

Rank	Athlete	Time
1st place, gold medalist(s)	Ismail Al-Sabiani (KSA)	47.31
2nd place, silver medalist(s)	Yousef Masrahi (KSA)	47.49
3rd place, bronze medalist(s)	Sergey Zaikov (KAZ)	47.63
4	Ali Shirook (UAE)	48.67
—	Reza Bouazar (IRI)	DNF
—	Saud Abdelkarim (UAE)	DNF

==== 800 m ====
===== Round 1 =====
1 November

Rank	Athlete	Time
Heat 1
1	Adnan Taess (IRQ)	1:57.85
2	Amir Moradi (IRI)	1:57.87
3	Abdulaziz Ladan (KSA)	1:58.07
4	Pankaj Dimri (IND)	1:58.38
5	Nguyễn Đình Cương (VIE)	1:59.11
6	Watcharin Waekachi (THA)	2:00.69
Heat 2
1	Mohammad Al-Azemi (KUW)	1:51.17
2	Sajjad Moradi (IRI)	1:51.49
3	Ghamanda Ram (IND)	1:52.20
4	Jakkrit Pattasai (THA)	1:56.40
5	Saysana Bannavong (LAO)	2:02.61

===== Final =====
2 November

Rank	Athlete	Time
1st place, gold medalist(s)	Sajjad Moradi (IRI)	1:48.48
2nd place, silver medalist(s)	Mohammad Al-Azemi (KUW)	1:48.93
3rd place, bronze medalist(s)	Adnan Taess (IRQ)	1:49.59
4	Amir Moradi (IRI)	1:51.28
5	Jakkrit Pattasai (THA)	1:57.63
—	Ghamanda Ram (IND)	DNF

==== 1500 m ====
===== Round 1 =====
1 November

Rank	Athlete	Time
Heat 1
1	Abubaker Ali Kamal (QAT)	3:55.99
2	Zhang Haikun (CHN)	3:56.14
3	Adnan Taess (IRQ)	3:56.34
4	Poomani Ebenazer (IND)	3:57.09
5	Shin Hyun-su (KOR)	3:58.98
—	Amir Moradi (IRI)	DNF
—	Ajmal Amirov (TJK)	DNS
Heat 2
1	Omar Al-Rasheedi (KUW)	4:01.12
2	Alemu Bekele (BRN)	4:01.26
3	Naresh Yadav (IND)	4:01.29
4	Thamer Kamal Ali (QAT)	4:01.31
5	Patikarn Pechsricha (THA)	4:06.40
—	Sajjad Moradi (IRI)	DNS

===== Final =====
2 November

Rank	Athlete	Time
1st place, gold medalist(s)	Thamer Kamal Ali (QAT)	3:42.36
2nd place, silver medalist(s)	Alemu Bekele (BRN)	3:43.66
3rd place, bronze medalist(s)	Abubaker Ali Kamal (QAT)	3:44.07
4	Omar Al-Rasheedi (KUW)	3:46.69
5	Zhang Haikun (CHN)	3:46.70
6	Poomani Ebenazer (IND)	3:53.76
7	Naresh Yadav (IND)	3:54.08
8	Shin Hyun-su (KOR)	3:55.90
—	Adnan Taess (IRQ)	DNF

==== 3000 m ====
1 November

Rank	Athlete	Time
1st place, gold medalist(s)	James Kwalia (QAT)	8:00.40
2nd place, silver medalist(s)	Alemu Bekele (BRN)	8:01.50
3rd place, bronze medalist(s)	Essa Ismail Rashed (QAT)	8:05.87
4	Sandeep Karan Singh (IND)	8:12.78
5	Omar Al-Rasheedi (KUW)	8:19.65
6	Shin Hyun-su (KOR)	8:21.37
7	Ho Chin-ping (TPE)	8:26.74
8	Boonthung Srisung (THA)	8:31.63
9	Mohammad Yunus (IND)	8:42.48
10	Sanchai Namkhet (THA)	8:43.99
—	Ajmal Amirov (TJK)	DNS

==== 60 m hurdles ====
1 November

===== Round 1 =====
Rank	Athlete	Time
Heat 1
1	Ahmed Al-Muwallad (KSA)	7.82
2	Mohamed Issa Al-Thawadi (QAT)	7.85
3	Nazar Mukhametzhan (KAZ)	7.97
4	Abdulaziz Al-Mandeel (KUW)	8.31
5	Karrar Ali (IRQ)	8.48
—	Jalal Al-Ghabachi (OMA)	DNS
Heat 2
1	Ji Wei (CHN)	7.73
2	Jamras Rittidet (THA)	7.78
3	Sami Al-Haydar (KSA)	7.84
4	Gharib Al-Khaldi (OMA)	8.20
5	Choi Seon-ung (KOR)	8.31
—	Rouhollah Asgari (IRI)	DNF
Heat 3
1	Fawaz Al-Shammari (KUW)	7.97
2	Suphan Wongsriphuck (THA)	8.04
3	Ko Wen-ting (TPE)	8.14
4	K. A. Harish (IND)	8.19
5	Trần Nghĩa Nhân (VIE)	8.21
6	Iong Kim Fai (MAC)	8.37

===== Final =====
Rank	Athlete	Time
1st place, gold medalist(s)	Ji Wei (CHN)	7.69
2nd place, silver medalist(s)	Mohamed Issa Al-Thawadi (QAT)	7.81
3rd place, bronze medalist(s)	Sami Al-Haydar (KSA)	7.81
4	Ahmed Al-Muwallad (KSA)	7.85
5	Jamras Rittidet (THA)	7.88
6	Fawaz Al-Shammari (KUW)	7.92
7	Suphan Wongsriphuck (THA)	8.06
8	Nazar Mukhametzhan (KAZ)	8.06

==== 4 × 400 m relay ====
2 November

Rank	Team	Time
1st place, gold medalist(s)	Saudi Arabia (KSA)	3:10.31
2nd place, silver medalist(s)	Thailand (THA)	3:11.07
3rd place, bronze medalist(s)	United Arab Emirates (UAE)	3:11.40
4	India (IND)	3:13.01
5	Iraq (IRQ)	3:23.32

==== High jump ====
1 November

Rank	Athlete	Result
1st place, gold medalist(s)	Vitaliy Tsykunov (KAZ)	2.22
2nd place, silver medalist(s)	Majdeddin Ghazal (SYR)	2.22
3rd place, bronze medalist(s)	Zhao Kuansong (CHN)	2.20
4	Nguyễn Duy Bằng (VIE)	2.11
4	Hashem Al-Oqaibi (KSA)	2.11
6	Suchart Singhaklang (THA)	2.11
7	Nawaf Al-Yami (KSA)	2.05
8	Nikhil Chittarasu (IND)	2.05
9	Salem Nasser Bakheet (BRN)	2.05
10	Udara Silva (SRI)	2.05
11	Andre Dermawan (INA)	1.95

==== Pole vault ====
2 November

Rank	Athlete	Result
1st place, gold medalist(s)	Leonid Andreev (UZB)	5.60
2nd place, silver medalist(s)	Yang Yansheng (CHN)	5.40
3rd place, bronze medalist(s)	Kreeta Sintawacheewa (THA)	5.10
4	Mohsen Rabbani (IRI)	5.10
5	Fahad Al-Mershad (KUW)	5.00
6	Eshagh Ghaffari (IRI)	5.00
7	K. P. Bimin (IND)	4.80
8	Jin Min-sub (KOR)	4.80
9	Bader Hashim (QAT)	4.70
—	Ali Al-Sabaghah (KUW)	NM
—	Ying Yot (LAO)	NM
—	Sompong Saombankuay (THA)	NM
—	Mohamed Abbas Darwish (UAE)	DNS

==== Long jump ====
1 November

Rank	Athlete	Result
1st place, gold medalist(s)	Ahmed Faiz (KSA)	7.96
2nd place, silver medalist(s)	Zhuang Haitao (CHN)	7.91
3rd place, bronze medalist(s)	Theerayut Philakong (THA)	7.71
4	Hussein Al-Sabee (KSA)	7.68
5	Saleh Al-Haddad (KUW)	7.60
6	Mohammad Arzandeh (IRI)	7.60
7	Konstantin Safronov (KAZ)	7.57
8	Kwak Chang-man (KOR)	7.46
9	Supanara Sukhasvasti (THA)	7.39
10	Mohammad Ibrar (IND)	7.37
11	Chao Chih-chien (TPE)	7.34
12	Behrouz Sistanipour (IRI)	7.28
13	Nguyễn Văn Mùa (VIE)	7.13
14	Asril Abdullah (INA)	6.95
15	Sipaseuth Phetxomphou (LAO)	6.39
—	Nayana Prasad Dharmaratne (SRI)	NM

==== Triple jump ====
2 November

Rank	Athlete	Result
1st place, gold medalist(s)	Roman Valiyev (KAZ)	16.60
2nd place, silver medalist(s)	Yevgeniy Ektov (KAZ)	16.44
3rd place, bronze medalist(s)	Theerayut Philakong (THA)	16.05
4	Mohamed Abbas Darwish (UAE)	16.03
5	Amarjit Singh (IND)	15.68
6	Varunyoo Kongnil (THA)	15.61
7	Nguyễn Văn Hùng (VIE)	15.61
8	Ruslan Kurbanov (UZB)	15.32
9	Rakesh Babu (IND)	14.91
10	Yu Jae-hyeok (KOR)	14.90
—	Wu Bo (CHN)	NM
—	Ahmed Faraj (KSA)	DNS
—	Mohamed Yusuf Salman (BRN)	DNS

==== Shot put ====
2 November

Rank	Athlete	Result
1st place, gold medalist(s)	Amin Nikfar (IRI)	19.66
2nd place, silver medalist(s)	Chang Ming-huang (TPE)	19.55
3rd place, bronze medalist(s)	Sultan Al-Hebshi (KSA)	19.39
4	Mashari Suroor (KUW)	18.43
5	Sourabh Vij (IND)	18.38
6	Mehdi Shahrokhi (IRI)	18.32
7	Grigoriy Kamulya (UZB)	17.93
8	Satyender Singh (IND)	17.49
9	Chatchawal Polyiam (THA)	16.58
10	Sathaporn Kajorn (THA)	14.61
11	Hou Fei (MAC)	13.94

==== Heptathlon ====
1–2 November

Rank	Athlete	60M	Long jump	Shot put	High jump	60M hurdles	Pole vault	1000M	Total
1st place, gold medalist(s)	Mohammed Al-Qaree (KSA)	6.84; 940	7.35; 896	13.25; 682	2.06; 859	8.17; 939	4.40; 731	2:52.04; 744	5791
2nd place, silver medalist(s)	Dmitriy Karpov (KAZ)	7.25; 796	6.89; 788	14.93; 785	1.97; 776	8.21; 930	4.70; 819	2:47.02; 797	5691
3rd place, bronze medalist(s)	Vũ Văn Huyện (VIE)	6.96; 897	7.18; 857	11.64; 585	2.00; 803	8.43; 877	4.60; 790	2:45.52; 813	5622
4	P. J. Vinod (IND)	7.04; 868	6.92; 792	14.33; 749	1.82; 644	8.40; 884	4.50; 760	2:54.50; 719	5416
5	Hadi Sepehrzad (IRI)	7.14; 833	6.64; 727	15.63; 828	1.88; 696	8.33; 900	3.90; 590	3:06.60; 601	5175
6	Oudonsak Chanthavong (LAO)	7.31; 775	6.45; 684	8.32; 385	1.85; 670	8.58; 841	NM; 0	2:55.00; 714	4069
—	Pavel Dubitskiy (KAZ)	7.21; 809	6.84; 776	12.82; 657	2.03; 831	DNF; 0	DNS		DNF
—	Boonkete Chalon (THA)	7.13; 837	6.77; 757	12.10; 612	NM; 0	8.71; 811	DNS		DNF
—	Lin Qingquan (CHN)	7.27; 789	DNS						DNF

=== Women ===
==== 60 m ====
31 October

===== Round 1 =====
Rank	Athlete	Time
Heat 1
1	Nongnuch Sanrat (THA)	7.48
2	Jiang Lan (CHN)	7.63
3	Natalya Ivoninskaya (KAZ)	7.65
4	Dana Hussein (IRQ)	7.73
5	Hawwa Haneefa (MDV)	8.34
6	Najah Al-Asmia (OMA)	8.63
7	Jyothi Janardhanan (QAT)	8.80
Heat 2
1	Vũ Thị Hương (VIE)	7.32
2	Guzel Khubbieva (UZB)	7.50
3	Achala Dias (SRI)	7.71
4	Vansy Thammalat (LAO)	8.33
—	Dalal Al-Qati (KUW)	DNF
—	Ýelena Rýabowa (TKM)	DNS
Heat 3
1	Orranut Klomdee (THA)	7.51
2	Munira Saleh (SYR)	7.56
3	Lê Ngọc Phượng (VIE)	7.57
4	Gulustan Mahmood (IRQ)	7.59
5	Arjina Khatun (IND)	7.81
6	Phody Sithideth (LAO)	8.16

===== Final =====
Rank	Athlete	Time
1st place, gold medalist(s)	Vũ Thị Hương (VIE)	7.24
2nd place, silver medalist(s)	Guzel Khubbieva (UZB)	7.39
3rd place, bronze medalist(s)	Nongnuch Sanrat (THA)	7.42
4	Orranut Klomdee (THA)	7.43
5	Jiang Lan (CHN)	7.52
6	Gulustan Mahmood (IRQ)	7.53
7	Munira Saleh (SYR)	7.54
8	Lê Ngọc Phượng (VIE)	7.55

==== 400 m ====
===== Round 1 =====
31 October

Rank	Athlete	Time
Heat 1
1	Chen Jingwen (CHN)	54.81
2	Marina Maslyonko (KAZ)	55.07
3	Karat Srimuang (THA)	55.74
4	Kim Hee-jung (KOR)	59.47
5	Alaa Hikmat (IRQ)	1:13.83
Heat 2
1	Gulustan Mahmood (IRQ)	55.49
2	Treewadee Yongphan (THA)	55.68
3	Olga Tereshkova (KAZ)	58.28
4	Sayloung Inthavong (LAO)	1:06.03
—	Merjen Ishangulyýewa (TKM)	DNS
—	Dhai Al-Mulla (KUW)	DNS

===== Final =====
1 November

Rank	Athlete	Time
1st place, gold medalist(s)	Chen Jingwen (CHN)	53.58
2nd place, silver medalist(s)	Gulustan Mahmood (IRQ)	53.75
3rd place, bronze medalist(s)	Marina Maslyonko (KAZ)	54.34
4	Treewadee Yongphan (THA)	54.98
5	Karat Srimuang (THA)	55.53
6	Olga Tereshkova (KAZ)	56.99

==== 800 m ====
2 November

Rank	Athlete	Time
1st place, gold medalist(s)	Margarita Matsko (KAZ)	2:03.06
2nd place, silver medalist(s)	Trương Thanh Hằng (VIE)	2:03.65
3rd place, bronze medalist(s)	Viktoriya Yalovtseva (KAZ)	2:03.74
4	Mimi Belete (BRN)	2:06.67
5	Souksavanh Malivanh (LAO)	2:31.04
—	Inam Khazaal (IRQ)	DNF
—	Merjen Ishangulyýewa (TKM)	DNS

==== 1500 m ====
31 October

Rank	Athlete	Time
1st place, gold medalist(s)	Liu Qing (CHN)	4:19.04
2nd place, silver medalist(s)	Mimi Belete (BRN)	4:19.79
3rd place, bronze medalist(s)	Trương Thanh Hằng (VIE)	4:23.04
4	Leila Ebrahimi (IRI)	4:26.10
5	Bùi Thị Hiền (VIE)	4:29.27
6	Youm Go-eun (KOR)	4:40.25
7	Priyanka Singh Patel (IND)	4:43.36
8	Inam Khazaal (IRQ)	4:51.48
—	Shitaye Eshete (BRN)	DNS

==== 3000 m ====
2 November

Rank	Athlete	Time
1st place, gold medalist(s)	Tejitu Daba (BRN)	9:32.65
2nd place, silver medalist(s)	Bùi Thị Hiền (VIE)	9:37.19
3rd place, bronze medalist(s)	Gladys Kibiwot (BRN)	9:42.64
4	Youm Go-eun (KOR)	9:46.35
5	Leila Ebrahimi (IRI)	9:51.08
6	L. Surya (IND)	9:51.19
7	Phạm Thị Hiền (VIE)	10:02.78
8	Lalita Babar (IND)	10:22.27
9	Woraphan Nuansri (THA)	10:37.36

==== 60 m hurdles ====
2 November

Rank	Athlete	Time
1st place, gold medalist(s)	Wallapa Pansoongneun (THA)	8.28
2nd place, silver medalist(s)	Natalya Ivoninskaya (KAZ)	8.38
3rd place, bronze medalist(s)	Anastassiya Soprunova (KAZ)	8.39
4	Wang Li (CHN)	8.43
5	Gayathri Govindaraj (IND)	8.47
6	Vũ Thị Hằng Ni (VIE)	8.49
7	Wassana Winatho (THA)	8.55
—	Ýelena Rýabowa (TKM)	DNS

==== 4 × 400 m relay ====
2 November

Rank	Team	Time
1st place, gold medalist(s)	Kazakhstan (KAZ)	3:39.21
2nd place, silver medalist(s)	India (IND)	3:41.23
3rd place, bronze medalist(s)	Thailand (THA)	3:41.37
4	Iraq (IRQ)	3:59.01

==== High jump ====
2 November

Rank	Athlete	Result
1st place, gold medalist(s)	Nadiya Dusanova (UZB)	1.93
2nd place, silver medalist(s)	Noengrothai Chaipetch (THA)	1.93
3rd place, bronze medalist(s)	Wanida Boonwan (THA)	1.91
4	Zheng Xingjuan (CHN)	1.89
4	Svetlana Radzivil (UZB)	1.89
6	Wu Meng-chia (TPE)	1.80
7	Bùi Thị Nhung (VIE)	1.80
8	Kavya Muthanna (IND)	1.80
9	Yekaterina Yevseyeva (KAZ)	1.80
10	Priyangika Madumanthi (SRI)	1.75
11	Kang Yeon-jung (KOR)	1.75
12	Rim Abdullah (SYR)	1.65

==== Pole vault ====
31 October

Rank	Athlete	Result
1st place, gold medalist(s)	Li Ling (CHN)	4.45
2nd place, silver medalist(s)	Lê Thị Phương (VIE)	4.00
3rd place, bronze medalist(s)	Ni Putu Desi Margawati (INA)	4.00
4	Sukanya Chomchuendee (THA)	3.70
5	Sunisa Kaoiad (THA)	3.60
6	Trần Thị Lan (VIE)	3.40
7	Toukta Khamboonheung (LAO)	3.00
—	Madhushini Devi (IND)	DNS

==== Long jump ====
2 November

Rank	Athlete	Result
1st place, gold medalist(s)	Olga Rypakova (KAZ)	6.58
2nd place, silver medalist(s)	Yuliya Tarasova (UZB)	6.45
3rd place, bronze medalist(s)	M. A. Prajusha (IND)	6.27
4	Chen Yaling (CHN)	6.27
5	Aleksandra Kotlyarova (UZB)	6.26
6	Thitima Muangjan (THA)	6.18
7	Sirada Seechaichana (THA)	6.13
8	Reshmi Bose (IND)	6.09
9	Maria Natalia Londa (INA)	5.88

==== Triple jump ====
1 November

Rank	Athlete	Result
1st place, gold medalist(s)	Olga Rypakova (KAZ)	14.40
2nd place, silver medalist(s)	Irina Litvinenko (KAZ)	13.87
3rd place, bronze medalist(s)	Thitima Muangjan (THA)	13.78
4	Li Yanmei (CHN)	13.68
5	Aleksandra Kotlyarova (UZB)	13.58
6	M. A. Prajusha (IND)	13.42
7	Sirada Seechaichana (THA)	13.26
8	Maria Natalia Londa (INA)	13.04
9	Tessymole Joseph (IND)	12.78
10	Valeriya Kanatova (UZB)	12.69
11	Fadwa Al-Bouza (SYR)	12.47

==== Shot put ====
31 October

Rank	Athlete	Result
1st place, gold medalist(s)	Leila Rajabi (IRI)	17.07
2nd place, silver medalist(s)	Juttaporn Krasaeyan (THA)	16.12
3rd place, bronze medalist(s)	Lin Chia-ying (TPE)	16.08
4	Siwaporn Warapiang (THA)	13.99
5	Moon Eun-gi (KOR)	13.64
6	Neelam Jakhar (IND)	12.67
7	Salma Abdullah (QAT)	9.82
8	Maryam Al-Mutabaghi (KUW)	8.82

==== Pentathlon ====
31 October

Rank	Athlete	60M hurdles	High jump	Shot put	Long jump	800M	Total
1st place, gold medalist(s)	Wassana Winatho (THA)	8.63; 989	1.74; 903	11.68; 640	5.71; 759	2:23.95; 771	4062
2nd place, silver medalist(s)	Liu Haili (CHN)	8.79; 954	1.62; 759	12.23; 676	5.69; 756	2:24.50; 763	3908
3rd place, bronze medalist(s)	Nguyễn Thị Thu Cúc (VIE)	9.15; 879	1.68; 830	10.78; 581	5.57; 720	2:25.17; 755	3765
4	Chu Chia-ling (TPE)	8.93; 925	1.71; 867	10.40; 556	5.65; 744	2:39.02; 584	3676
5	Dương Thị Việt Anh (VIE)	9.49; 810	1.77; 941	10.00; 529	5.72; 765	2:46.36; 502	3547
6	K. D. Sindhu (IND)	9.53; 802	1.68; 830	9.60; 503	5.33; 651	2:25.64; 749	3535
7	Navpreet Kaur (IND)	9.24; 860	1.56; 689	9.96; 527	4.94; 543	2:34.06; 643	3262
8	Alaa Hikmat (IRQ)	9.98; 716	1.35; 460	7.98; 398	4.76; 495	DNF; 0	2069
9	Pylaylack Sackpaseuth (LAO)	DNF; 0	1.41; 523	8.74; 447	5.00; 557	2:51.13; 452	1979
