= List of Asian Indoor and Martial Arts Games records in indoor athletics =

The Asian Indoor Games is a biennial event which began in 2005. The Olympic Council of Asia accepts only athletes who are representing one of the organisation's member states (most of which are within Asia) and recognises records set at editions of the Asian Indoor Games. The Games records in athletics are the best marks set in competitions at the Games.

== Men ==
Event	Record	Athlete	Nation	Games	Date	Notes
60 m	6.54	Samuel Francis	Qatar	30 October 2007	2007 Macau	
400 m	45.68	Abdalelah Haroun	Qatar	19 September 2017	2017 Ashgabat	
800 m	1:48.48	Sajjad Moradi	Iran	2 November 2009	2009 Hanoi	
1500 m	3:42.36	Thamer Kamal Ali	Qatar	2 November 2009	2009 Hanoi	
3000 m	8:00.40	James Kwalia	Qatar	1 November 2009	2009 Hanoi	
60 m hurdles	7.66	Ahmed Al-Muwallad	Saudi Arabia	18 September 2017	2017 Ashgabat	
High jump	2.26 m	Majdeddin Ghazal	Syria	20 September 2017	2017 Ashgabat	
High jump	2.26 m	Keivan Ghanbarzadeh	Iran	20 September 2017	2017 Ashgabat	
Pole vault	5.60 m	Leonid Andreev	Uzbekistan	2 November 2009	2009 Hanoi	
Long jump	7.96 m	Ahmed Faiz	Saudi Arabia	1 November 2009	2009 Hanoi	
Triple jump	16.60 m	Roman Valiyev	Kazakhstan	2 November 2009	2009 Hanoi	
Shot put	19.66 m	Amin Nikfar	Iran	2 November 2009	2009 Hanoi	
Heptathlon	5791 pts	Mohammed Al-Qaree	Saudi Arabia	1–2 November 2009	2009 Hanoi	
Heptathlon	60m / Long jump / Shot put / High jump / 60m H / Pole vault / 1000m; 6.84 / 7.35 m / 13.25 m / 2.06 m / 8.17 / 4.40 m / 2:52.04					
4 × 400 m relay	3:10.31	Yousef Masrahi; Ismail Al-Sabiani; Hamed Al-Bishi; Bandar Sharahili	Saudi Arabia	2 November 2009	2009 Hanoi	

== Women ==
Event	Record	Athlete	Nation	Games	Date	Notes
60 m	7.24	Vũ Thị Hương	Vietnam	31 October 2009	2009 Hanoi	
400 m	52.69	Tatyana Roslanova	Kazakhstan	14 November 2005	2005 Bangkok	
800 m	2:03.06	Margarita Matsko	Kazakhstan	2 November 2009	2009 Hanoi	
1500 m	4:15.75	O. P. Jaisha	India	15 November 2005	2005 Bangkok	
3000 m	9:23.11	Chen Xiaofang	China	1 November 2007	2007 Macau	
60 m hurdles	8.28	Wallapa Pansoongneun	Thailand	2 November 2009	2009 Hanoi	
High jump	1.93 m	Nadiya Dusanova	Uzbekistan	2 November 2009	2009 Hanoi	
High jump	1.93 m	Noengrothai Chaipetch	Thailand	2 November 2009	2009 Hanoi	
Pole vault	4.45 m	Li Ling	China	31 October 2009	2009 Hanoi	
Long jump	6.58 m	Olga Rypakova	Kazakhstan	2 November 2009	2009 Hanoi	
Triple jump	14.40 m	Olga Rypakova	Kazakhstan	1 November 2009	2009 Hanoi	
Shot put	18.20 m	Li Ling	China	15 November 2005	2005 Bangkok	
Pentathlon	4179 pts	Irina Naumenko	Kazakhstan	30 October 2007	2007 Macau	
Pentathlon	60m H / High jump / Shot put / Long jump / 800m; 8.80 / 1.75 m / 12.59 m / 6.06 m / 2:26.10					
4 × 400 m relay	3:37.59	Tatyana Khajimuradova; Tatyana Azarova; Anna Gavriushenko; Olga Tereshkova	Kazakhstan	1 November 2007	2007 Macau	

== See also ==
- List of Asian Games records in athletics
- List of Asian Indoor Athletics Championships records
