= 2007 WPA World Eight-ball Championship =

WPA World 8-Ball Championship 2008
Tournament information
- Dates: 1–8 March 2007
- Venue: Fujairah Exhibition Centre, Al Diar Siji Hotel
- City: Fujairah, United Arab Emirates
- Organisation: WPA World Eight-ball Championship
- Format: Double Elimination / Single Elimination
- Discipline: Eight-ball
- Participants: 64

Final
- Champion: (Philippines) Ronato Alcano
- Runner-up: (Philippines) Dennis Orcollo
- Score: 11-8

The 2007 WPA World Eight-ball Championship was an eight-ball world championship, organized by the World Pool-Billiard Association (WPA), and held 1–8 March 2007 at the Fujairah Exhibition Centre of the Al Diar Siji Hotel in Fujairah, United Arab Emirates. A total of 64 players competed in the tournament.

The event was won by Ronato Alcano, who defeated Dennis Orcollo in the final 11–8.

== Tournament bracket ==
=== Preliminary round ===
The following players won one match in the preliminary round, and finished between 33 and 48th

PHL Joven Alba	ARE Issa al-Boloshi	EGY Kareem al-Gendi	ARE Hani al-Howri
ARE Saleem al-Juneebi	KWT Nasser al-Mujabal	ARE Saleh al-Rimawi	VEN Rizandro Arrieta
DNK Henrik Asperup	ENG Karl Boyes	DEU Thomas Damm	DEU Günter Geisen
FIN Aki Heiskanen	QAT Bashar Hussain	DEU Olaf Köster	DEU Oliver Ortmann

The following players did not win a round in the preliminary tournament, and were ranked 49th to 64th.

GTM Carlos Alburez	ARE Muhammed al-Hosani	ARE Mubarak al-Juneebi	PAK Arif Allah
ARE Saeed al-Mutawe	ARE Omar al-Serkal	EGY Mohammed Aseel	IND Mohammed Asim
ENG Karl Boyes	AUS Alex Evreniadis	AUT Michael Felder	ATG Roberto Freitas
IND Rafath Habib	PHL Jobert Panga	ARE Omran Salem	ZAF Zbyniek Vaic

=== Finals ===
1st Round
SRB Goran Mladenovic	10
CAN Jason Klatt	7
IRN Farhad Shaverdi	6
PHL Joven Bustamante	10
BEL Serge Das	8
JPN Hisashi Kusano	10
PHL Francisco Bustamante	9
DEU Thomas Engert	10
SWE Marcus Chamat	10
JPN Satoshi Kawabata	5
PHL Efren Reyes	10
PHL James Ortega	2
ENG Darren Appleton	4
DEU Ralf Souquet	10
PHL Dennis Orcollo	10
AUS Bun Nunan	3
ITA Fabio Petroni	9
SAU Naif al-Jeweni	10
PHL Ronato Alcano	10
DEU Thorsten Hohmann	3
TPE Hsia Hui-kai	10
DEU Kevin Becker	2
PHL Elvis Calasang	10
PHL Joybe Vincente	9
NLD Niels Feijen	10
PHL Mario Tolentino	7
TPE Wu Chia-Ching	8
DEU Alexander Dremsizis	10
CAN Erik Hjorleifson	10
QAT Mohammed Benali	4
NLD Nick van den Berg	10
PHL Lee Vann Corteza	7

2nd Round
SRB Goran Mladenovic	6
PHL Joven Bustamante	10
JPN Hisashi Kusano	4
DEU Thomas Engert	10
SWE Marcus Chamat	10
PHL Efren Reyes	4
DEU Ralf Souquet	8
PHL Dennis Orcollo	10
SAU Naif al-Jeweni	3
PHL Ronato Alcano	10
TPE Hsia Hui-kai	6
PHL Elvis Calasang	10
NLD Niels Feijen	10
DEU Alexander Dremsizis	6
CAN Erik Hjorleifson	6
NLD Nick van den Berg	10

Quarterfinals
PHL Joven Bustamante	10
DEU Thomas Engert	6
SWE Marcus Chamat	7
PHL Dennis Orcollo	10
PHL Ronato Alcano	10
PHL Elvis Calasang	4
NLD Niels Feijen	10
NLD Nick van den Berg	2

Semifinals
PHL Joven Bustamante	5
PHL Dennis Orcollo	10
PHL Ronato Alcano	10
NLD Niels Feijen	4

Finals
PHL Dennis Orcollo	8
PHL Ronato Alcano	11
