= 2015 Welsh Open (snooker) =

2015 BetVictor Welsh Open
Tournament information
- Dates: 16–22 February 2015
- Venue: Motorpoint Arena
- City: Cardiff
- Country: Wales
- Organisation: World Snooker
- Format: Ranking event
- Total prize fund: £300,000
- Winner's share: £60,000
- Highest break: Luca Brecel (BEL) (140)

Final
- Champion: John Higgins (SCO)
- Runner-up: Ben Woollaston (ENG)
- Score: 9–3

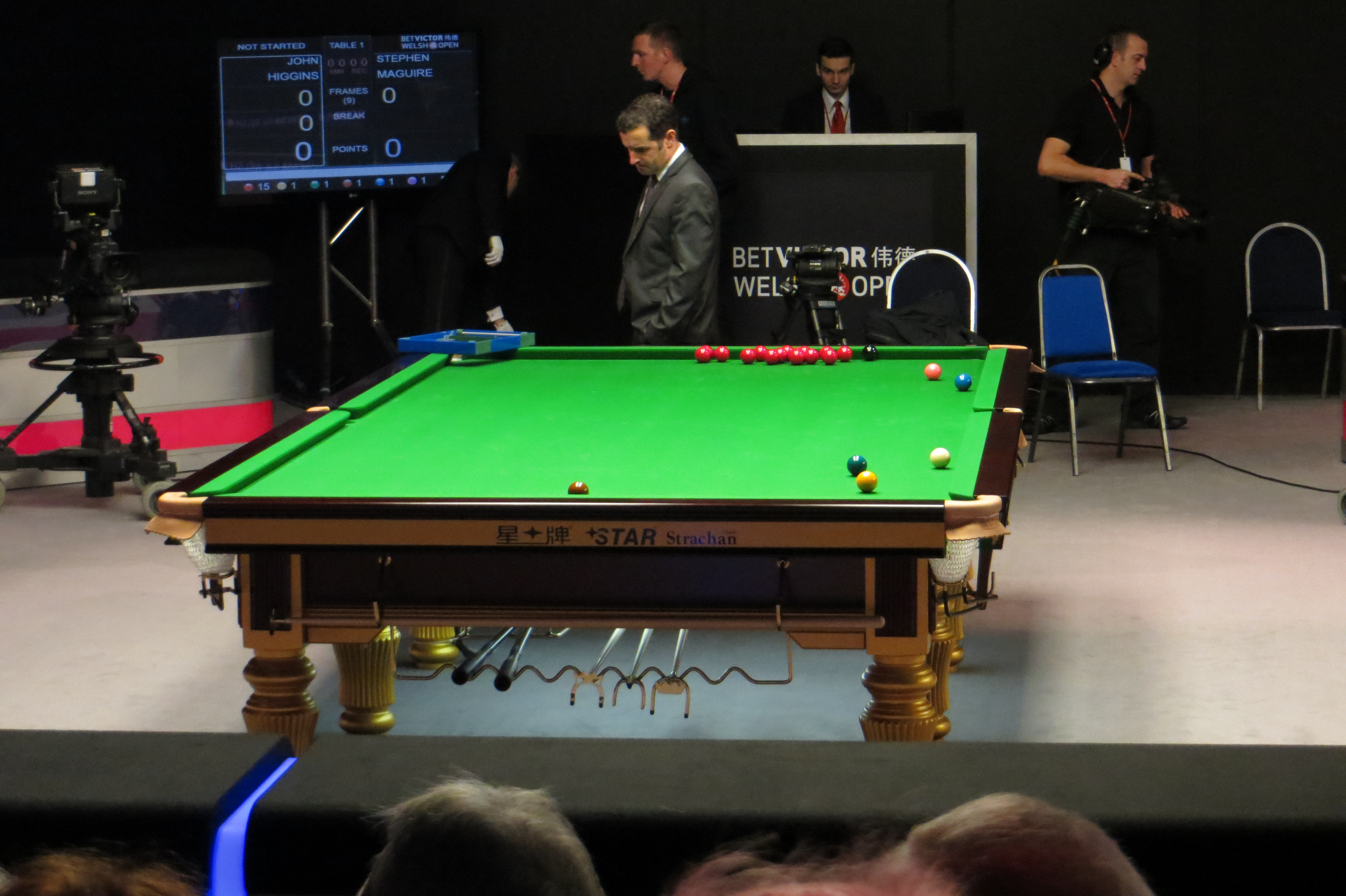
Televised table during the quarter-finals

The 2015 Welsh Open (officially the 2015 BetVictor Welsh Open) was a professional ranking snooker tournament held at the Motorpoint Arena in Cardiff from 16 to 22 February 2015. The tournament was staged in Cardiff for the first time since 2004, having moved from Newport.

Ronnie O'Sullivan was the defending champion, but he lost 3–4 against Matthew Stevens in the last 32.

The best-performing Welsh player was Mark Williams, who reached the semi-finals of the tournament for the first time in 12 years. He lost 5–6 to Ben Woollaston, who reached the first ranking final of his professional career.

John Higgins defeated Woollaston 9–3 in the final to win the Welsh Open for a record fourth time and claim his first ranking title in two and a half years.

== Prize fund ==
The breakdown of prize money for this year is shown below:

- Winner: £60,000
- Runner-up: £30,000
- Semi-finals: £20,000
- Quarter-finals: £10,000
- Last 16: £5,000
- Last 32: £2,500
- Last 64: £1,500
- Highest break: £2,000
- Total: £300,000

== Main draw ==
128 players started the tournament, with the first four rounds played over the best of 7 frames. The quarter finals were played over 9 frames with the semi-finals over the best of 11. The final was over 17 frames.

=== Top half ===
==== Section 1 ====
Last 128; Best of 7 frames
(England) Ronnie O'Sullivan	4
(Australia) Vinnie Calabrese	1
(England) Rory McLeod	4
(Wales) Andrew Pagett	2
(Republic of Ireland) Ken Doherty	4
(China) Zhou Yuelong	3
(Wales) Matthew Stevens	4
(England) Oliver Lines	3
(England) Michael Holt	2
(England) Ashley Carty	4
(England) Alfie Burden	4
(England) Andrew Norman	1
(Thailand) Dechawat Poomjaeng	4
(England) Allan Taylor	3
(Hong Kong) Marco Fu	4
(England) Ian Glover	2

Last 64; Best of 7 frames
(England) Ronnie O'Sullivan	4
(England) Rory McLeod	2
(Republic of Ireland) Ken Doherty	3
(Wales) Matthew Stevens	4
(England) Ashley Carty	4
(England) Alfie Burden	0
(Thailand) Dechawat Poomjaeng	2
(Hong Kong) Marco Fu	4

Last 32; Best of 7 frames
(England) Ronnie O'Sullivan	3
(Wales) Matthew Stevens	4
(England) Ashley Carty	2
(Hong Kong) Marco Fu	4

Last 16; Best of 7 frames
(Wales) Matthew Stevens	2
(Hong Kong) Marco Fu	4

==== Section 2 ====
Last 128; Best of 7 frames
(England) Shaun Murphy	4
(England) Steven Hallworth	3
(Wales) Jamie Jones	4
(England) Chris Norbury	0
(England) Jimmy White	3
(England) Barry Pinches	4
(Wales) Mark Williams	4
(China) Lyu Haotian	0
(Wales) Dominic Dale	3
(England) Michael Wasley	4
(England) Jack Lisowski	3
(China) Li Hang	4
(England) Mark Joyce	4
(England) Joel Walker	2
(England) Judd Trump	4
(Thailand) James Wattana	2

Last 64; Best of 7 frames
(England) Shaun Murphy	3
(Wales) Jamie Jones	4
(England) Barry Pinches	2
(Wales) Mark Williams	4
(England) Michael Wasley	4
(China) Li Hang	2
(England) Mark Joyce	0
(England) Judd Trump	4

Last 32; Best of 7 frames
(Wales) Jamie Jones	2
(Wales) Mark Williams	4
(England) Michael Wasley	2
(England) Judd Trump	4

Last 16; Best of 7 frames
(Wales) Mark Williams	4
(England) Judd Trump	1

==== Section 3 ====
Last 128; Best of 7 frames
(Northern Ireland) Mark Allen	4
(Switzerland) Alexander Ursenbacher	1
(China) Cao Yupeng	4
(England) Craig Steadman	2
(England) Ben Woollaston	4
(Thailand) Thanawat Thirapongpaiboon	2
(England) Mark Davis	4
(China) Lyu Chenwei	3
(China) Xiao Guodong	4
(Northern Ireland) Joe Swail	1
(England) Matthew Selt	4
(England) Ian Burns	1
(England) Mark King	4
(Scotland) Eden Sharav	0
(England) Ali Carter	4
(Scotland) Fraser Patrick	1

Last 64; Best of 7 frames
(Northern Ireland) Mark Allen	4
(China) Cao Yupeng	3
(England) Ben Woollaston	4
(England) Mark Davis	1
(China) Xiao Guodong	1
(England) Matthew Selt	4
(England) Mark King	0
(England) Ali Carter	4

Last 32; Best of 7 frames
(Northern Ireland) Mark Allen	3
(England) Ben Woollaston	4
(England) Matthew Selt	3
(England) Ali Carter	4

Last 16; Best of 7 frames
(England) Ben Woollaston	4
(England) Ali Carter	2

==== Section 4 ====
Last 128; Best of 7 frames
(England) Joe Perry	4
(England) Lee Page	3
(China) Yu Delu	w/o
(Republic of Ireland) John Sutton	w/d
(England) Gary Wilson	4
(China) Zhang Anda	0
(England) David Gilbert	1
(England) John Astley	4
(Scotland) Anthony McGill	4
(England) David Grace	3
(England) Jamie Cope	4
(England) Elliot Slessor	3
(Republic of Ireland) David Morris	4
(England) Joe O'Connor	0
(Australia) Neil Robertson	4
(England) James Cahill	0

Last 64; Best of 7 frames
(England) Joe Perry	4
(China) Yu Delu	0
(England) Gary Wilson	4
(England) John Astley	3
(Scotland) Anthony McGill	2
(England) Jamie Cope	4
(Republic of Ireland) David Morris	0
(Australia) Neil Robertson	4

Last 32; Best of 7 frames
(England) Joe Perry	2
(England) Gary Wilson	4
(England) Jamie Cope	3
(Australia) Neil Robertson	4

Last 16; Best of 7 frames
(England) Gary Wilson	4
(Australia) Neil Robertson	2

=== Bottom half ===
==== Section 5 ====
Last 128; Best of 7 frames
(China) Ding Junhui	1
(Wales) Lee Walker	4
(England) Peter Lines	1
(England) Michael Georgiou	4
(England) Andrew Higginson	2
(England) Chris Wakelin	4
(Scotland) Graeme Dott	4
(England) Zak Surety	1
(China) Liang Wenbo	4
(China) Cao Xinlong	0
(Northern Ireland) Gerard Greene	4
(Wales) Daniel Wells	2
(Scotland) Jamie Burnett	3
(Malta) Alex Borg	4
(Scotland) John Higgins	4
(Scotland) Michael Leslie	1

Last 64; Best of 7 frames
(Wales) Lee Walker	2
(England) Michael Georgiou	4
(England) Chris Wakelin	1
(Scotland) Graeme Dott	4
(China) Liang Wenbo	4
(Northern Ireland) Gerard Greene	0
(Malta) Alex Borg	0
(Scotland) John Higgins	4

Last 32; Best of 7 frames
(England) Michael Georgiou	4
(Scotland) Graeme Dott	3
(China) Liang Wenbo	0
(Scotland) John Higgins	4

Last 16; Best of 7 frames
(England) Michael Georgiou	2
(Scotland) John Higgins	4

==== Section 6 ====
Last 128; Best of 7 frames
(Scotland) Stephen Maguire	4
(Wales) Duane Jones	0
(Norway) Kurt Maflin	1
(England) Liam Highfield	4
(England) Robbie Williams	1
(England) Dave Harold	4
(Republic of Ireland) Fergal O'Brien	3
(England) Sam Baird	4
(Scotland) Alan McManus	4
(Wales) Jamie Clarke	2
(England) Anthony Hamilton	0
(Qatar) Ahmed Saif	4
(India) Aditya Mehta	4
(England) Sydney Wilson	0
(England) Barry Hawkins	4
(Scotland) Scott Donaldson	3

Last 64; Best of 7 frames
(Scotland) Stephen Maguire	4
(England) Liam Highfield	2
(England) Dave Harold	0
(England) Sam Baird	4
(Scotland) Alan McManus	4
(Qatar) Ahmed Saif	0
(India) Aditya Mehta	4
(England) Barry Hawkins	2

Last 32; Best of 7 frames
(Scotland) Stephen Maguire	4
(England) Sam Baird	2
(Scotland) Alan McManus	4
(India) Aditya Mehta	0

Last 16; Best of 7 frames
(Scotland) Stephen Maguire	4
(Scotland) Alan McManus	0

==== Section 7 ====
Last 128; Best of 7 frames
(England) Stuart Bingham	4
(Malaysia) Thor Chuan Leong	3
(England) Kyren Wilson	0
(Finland) Robin Hull	4
(England) Nigel Bond	3
(England) Chris Melling	4
(Wales) Michael White	4
(Scotland) Ross Muir	1
(England) Martin Gould	4
(Wales) Jak Jones	0
(England) Rod Lawler	4
(England) Hammad Miah	1
(Thailand) Thepchaiya Un-Nooh	4
(England) Mitchell Mann	2
(England) Ricky Walden	4
(China) Lu Ning	0

Last 64; Best of 7 frames
(England) Stuart Bingham	4
(Finland) Robin Hull	2
(England) Chris Melling	0
(Wales) Michael White	4
(England) Martin Gould	4
(England) Rod Lawler	1
(Thailand) Thepchaiya Un-Nooh	1
(England) Ricky Walden	4

Last 32; Best of 7 frames
(England) Stuart Bingham	4
(Wales) Michael White	1
(England) Martin Gould	2
(England) Ricky Walden	4

Last 16; Best of 7 frames
(England) Stuart Bingham	2
(England) Ricky Walden	4

==== Section 8 ====
Last 128; Best of 7 frames
(England) Robert Milkins	0
(Belgium) Luca Brecel	4
(England) Tom Ford	2
(China) Tian Pengfei	4
(England) Mike Dunn	3
(England) Oliver Brown	4
(Wales) Ryan Day	4
(Thailand) Noppon Saengkham	1
(England) Peter Ebdon	4
(Malta) Tony Drago	0
(England) Jimmy Robertson	4
(Brazil) Igor Figueiredo	3
(Scotland) Marcus Campbell	4
(England) Stuart Carrington	3
(England) Mark Selby	4
(England) Alex Davies	0

Last 64; Best of 7 frames
(Belgium) Luca Brecel	4
(China) Tian Pengfei	1
(England) Oliver Brown	4
(Wales) Ryan Day	1
(England) Peter Ebdon	4
(England) Jimmy Robertson	1
(Scotland) Marcus Campbell	2
(England) Mark Selby	4

Last 32; Best of 7 frames
(Belgium) Luca Brecel	4
(England) Oliver Brown	0
(England) Peter Ebdon	3
(England) Mark Selby	4

Last 16; Best of 7 frames
(Belgium) Luca Brecel	4
(England) Mark Selby	3

=== Finals ===
Quarter-finals; Best of 9 frames
(Hong Kong) Marco Fu	1
(Wales) Mark Williams	5
(England) Ben Woollaston	5
(England) Gary Wilson	2
(Scotland) John Higgins	5
(Scotland) Stephen Maguire	1
(England) Ricky Walden	3
(Belgium) Luca Brecel	5

Semi-finals; Best of 11 frames
(Wales) Mark Williams	5
(England) Ben Woollaston	6
(Scotland) John Higgins	6
(Belgium) Luca Brecel	4

Final; Best of 17 frames
(England) Ben Woollaston	3
(Scotland) John Higgins	9

== Final ==
Final: Best of 17 frames. Referee: Marcel Eckardt; Motorpoint Arena, Cardiff, Wales, 22 February 2015.
Ben Woollaston; England	3–9	John Higgins; Scotland
Afternoon: 4–120 (84), 71–51 (58), 17–101 (63), 0–105 (105), 74–23 (54), 0–84 (66), 62–19, 59–72 (Woollaston 59); Evening: 5–97, 34–69, 9–88 (68), 8–130 (83)
59	Highest break	105
0	Century breaks	1
3	50+ breaks	6

== Century breaks ==
- 140, 101 – Luca Brecel
- 137, 135, 134, 105, 103, 101 – John Higgins
- 136 – Matthew Stevens
- 135, 131, 120, 114 – Mark Selby
- 133, 101 – Mark Allen
- 132 – Joe Perry
- 131, 116, 113, 103 – Neil Robertson
- 130 – Thepchaiya Un-Nooh
- 125, 106, 101 – Matthew Selt
- 122 – Peter Ebdon
- 119 – Alex Borg
- 117, 106, 102 – Shaun Murphy
- 116, 101 – Stephen Maguire
- 115, 105, 107 – Marco Fu
- 112 – Ding Junhui
- 110, 104 – Judd Trump
- 109 – Anthony McGill
- 108, 105, 103 – Mark Williams
- 108, 103 – Ben Woollaston
- 108 – Ricky Walden
- 107 – Chris Wakelin
- 106 – Ronnie O'Sullivan
- 104 – Jimmy White
- 104 – Elliot Slessor
- 104 – Dechawat Poomjaeng
- 103 – Mark Joyce
- 103 – Gerard Greene
- 103 – Ali Carter
- 102 – Fergal O'Brien
- 102 – Jamie Jones
- 101 – Rod Lawler
- 100 – Ken Doherty
- 100 – Jamie Cope
- 100 – Alan McManus
