= Hanoi Indoor Games Gymnasium =

Indoor arena in Hanoi, Vietnam

- Cung Điền kinh Hà Nội, Cung Thi đấu Điền kinh trong nhà Mỹ Đình
- Interactive map of Hanoi Indoor Games Gymnasium
- Full name: Mỹ Đình Indoor Athletics Arena
- Address: Trần Hữu Dực Street, Cầu Diễn, Từ Liêm; Hanoi; Vietnam
- Coordinates: 21°1′44.59″N 105°45′46.83″E
- Owner: Ministry of Culture, Sports and Tourism
- Operator: Vietnam National Sporting Complex
- Capacity: 3,094 (seating); 8,500 (concert)
- Type: Indoor arena

Construction
- Built: 8 July 2008
- Opened: 19 September 2009
- Cost: 546.3 billion VND (US$30.4 million in 2009)
- Main contractor: Construction Machinery Corporation (COMA)

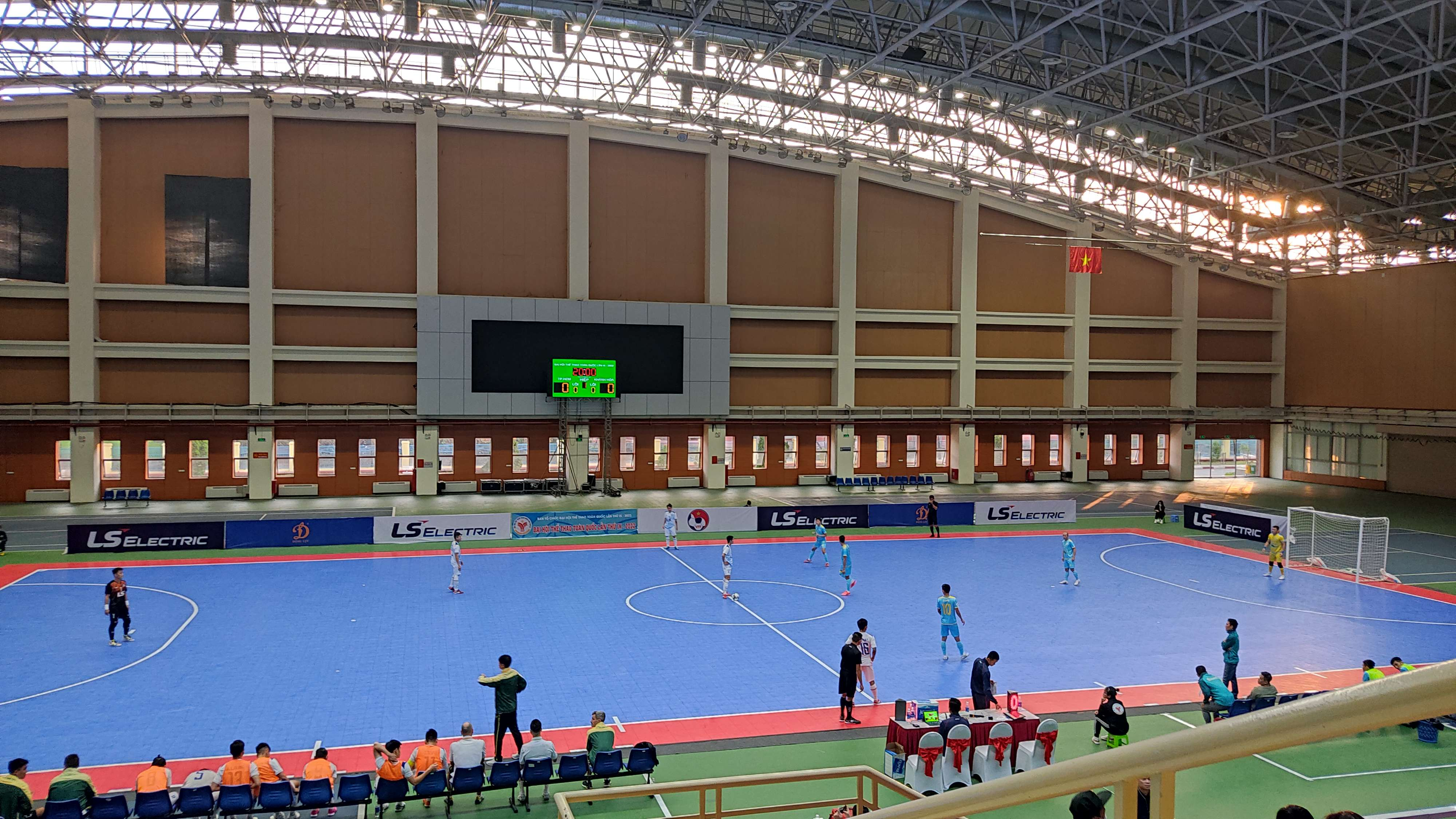
Hanoi Indoor Games Gymnasium in 2022

Hanoi Indoor Games Gymnasium or Mỹ Đình Indoor Athletics Arena (Vietnamese: Cung Điền kinh Hà Nội, Cung Thi đấu Điền kinh trong nhà Mỹ Đình) is an indoor arena in Hanoi, Vietnam. It has a capacity of 3,094 using permanent seating and temporary seating configuration. The arena is a part of Vietnam National Sporting Complex, situated north west of Mỹ Đình National Stadium and Mỹ Đình Aquatics Center.

The venue was one of several projects built to commemorate the Millennial Anniversary of Hanoi. It officially opened on September 19, 2009, after 14 months of construction, in time for the 2009 Asian Indoor Games.

== Design ==
The competition field of the arena has an area of 5,420 m^{2} (58,300 sq ft). To prepare for the 3rd Asian Indoor Games, the gymnasium was equipped with a 6-lane 200-meter oval track and a 60-meter straight track, supplied by Mondo. Without the tracks, the field could fit up to 6 tennis courts. The venue was designed to withstand earthquakes up to 5.9 Richter with a life span of 70 years.

== Usage ==
After Asian Indoor Games, the tracks were removed and the venue has yet to host another indoor athletics tournament since then. Hanoi Indoor Games Gymnasium has been used mostly for tennis matches, several local sporting events, exhibitions, concerts and other entertainment events.

=== Sports ===
- 2009 Asian Indoor Games (indoor athletics and closing ceremony)
- 9th Capital Sports Festival (opening ceremony)
- 2018 Davis Cup Asia/Oceania Zone Group III
- 2018 Vietnam National Games (taekwondo and tennis)
- 2021 Southeast Asian Games (Fencing and closing ceremony)

=== Entertainment events ===
List of notable entertainment events
Date	Artist	Event	Ref
5 June 2024	Westlife	The Hits Tour	
24 January 2025	OneRepublic	The Artificial Paradise Tour	
30 March 2025	Jisoo	Lights, Love, Action! Asia Tour	
4 October 2025	Baekhyun	Reverie World Tour	

== See also ==
- Phú Thọ Indoor Stadium
- Tân Bình Gymnasium
