= Ahmed Saif =

Qatari snooker player

Personal information
- Born: 1 January 1983 (age 43)

Sport
- Country: Qatar
- Sport: Snooker
- Professional: 2013–2015
- Highest ranking: 113 (June–July 2014)
Medal record
Men's Snooker
Representing Qatar
Pan Arab Games
| Silver medal – second place | 2011 Doha | Singles |
| Bronze medal – third place | 2011 Doha | Team |
Asian Indoor Games
| Silver medal – second place | 2009 Vietnam | Team |
| Silver medal – second place | 2017 Ashgabat | Team |

Ahmed Saif (born 1 January 1983) is a Qatari former professional snooker player. He was the first professional player from Qatar. Saif was a professional between 2013 and 2015, reaching a highest ranking of 113 in the world.

== Career ==
=== Amateur ===
Saif as an amateur represented the Qatari national snooker team at the 2002, 2006 and 2010 Asian Games, 2009 and 2013 Asian Indoor Games. Saif had success in the 2011 Pan Arab Games where he won a silver medal in the snooker singles, losing to Iraqi Firas Al-Shamini in the final, he also won a bronze in the team event alongside Ali Al Obaidly and Mohsen Bukshaisha.

Saif also appeared as a wildcard in 2008 Bahrain Championship, where he lost 5–1 to Robert Milkins in the wildcard round. He also appeared in the opening two Players Tour Championship events in the 2010/2011 season, however he lost both of them 4–0 to Andrew Higginson and Jamie Clarke.

=== Professional ===
Saif entered the 2013 Q School in an attempt to become Qatar's first professional snooker player. In the first event he beat fellow countryman Mohsen Bukshaisha, before falling to Shane Castle in the last 64. However, with wins over Zack Richardson, Duane Jones, Michael Georgiou, Antony Parsons and Jamie Clarke in the second event, Saif reached the semi-final stages and won a place on the main tour for the 2013–14 and 2014–15 seasons.

Saif was to endure a difficult debut season as a professional, as he failed to win a single match, winning only fourteen frames in fourteen matches, six of which came in his 10–6 loss to Scott Donaldson in the 2014 World Snooker Championship first qualifying round. He finished the season ranked 130.

Saif's first match win as a professional came in January 2015 at the minor-ranking Xuzhou Open over Chinese amateur Long Yun. Later, he achieved his first win in a full ranking event, beating Anthony Hamilton 4–0 at the 2015 Welsh Open, closing out the match with a 95 break which is the highest of his career in competitive play. However, Saif was whitewashed in the next round 4–0 by Alan McManus. He ended his stint on the tour ranked world number 117 and failed to come through Q School in an attempt to win his place back.

== Performance and Rankings timeline ==
| Tournament | 2008/ 09 | 2010/ 11 | 2013/ 14 | 2014/ 15 |
|---|---|---|---|---|
| Ranking (Note: It shows the ranking at the beginning of the season.) | (Note: He was an amateur.) | | (Note: New players don't have a ranking.) | 130 |
Ranking tournaments
| Shanghai Masters | A | A | LQ | LQ |
| International Championship | Not Held | | LQ | LQ |
| UK Championship | A | A | 1R | 1R |
| German Masters | NH | A | LQ | A |
| Welsh Open | A | A | 1R | 2R |
| Indian Open | Not Held | | LQ | LQ |
| Players Championship Grand Final (Note: The event was called the Players Tour Championship Grand Finals (2010/2011)) | NH | DNQ | DNQ | DNQ |
| China Open | A | A | LQ | LQ |
| World Championship | A | A | LQ | LQ |
Former ranking tournaments
| Bahrain Championship | WR | Not Held | | |
| World Open (Note: The event was called the Grand Prix (2008/2009)) | A | A | LQ | NH |

Performance Table Legend
| LQ | lost in the qualifying draw | #R | lost in the early rounds of the tournament (WR = Wildcard round, RR = Round robin) | QF | lost in the quarter-finals |
| SF | lost in the semi-finals | F | lost in the final | W | won the tournament |
| DNQ | did not qualify for the tournament | A | did not participate in the tournament | WD | withdrew from the tournament |

| NH / Not Held | means an event was not held. |
| NR / Non-Ranking Event | means an event is/was no longer a ranking event. |
| R / Ranking Event | means an event is/was a ranking event. |
| MR / Minor-Ranking Event | means an event is/was a minor-ranking event. |
