= Cue sports at the 2011 Arab Games =

Cue sports at the 2011 Pan Arab Games
- Venue: Qatar Billiards and Snooker Federation
- Location: Doha, Qatar
- Dates: 11-22 December

At the 2011 Pan Arab Games, the cue sports events were held at Qatar Billiards and Snooker Federation in Doha, Qatar from 11–22 December. A total of 5 events were contested.

== Medal summary ==
=== Men ===
Event	Gold	Silver	Bronze
Snooker Singles	Firas Al-Shamini (IRQ)	Ahmed Saif (QAT)	Mohamed Al Hashimi (UAE)
8-Balls Pool Singles	Jalal Odetalah (JOR)	Ayhab Nisuif (IRQ)	Khaled Al Mutairi (KUW)
9-Balls Pool Singles	Bader Al Awadhi (KUW)	Bashar Abdulmajeed (QAT)	Mazen Berjaoui (LIB)
9-Balls Pool Scotch Doubles	Jordan (JOR); Ashraf Al-Damen; Jalal Odetalah	Iraq (IRQ); Ahmed Al-Taweel; Ayhab Nisuif	Qatar (QAT); Bashar Abdulmajeed; Mohammed Al Binali
Snooker Team	Bahrain (BHR); Habib Humood; Heshum Alsaqr; Mohamed Al Shaikh	United Arab Emirates (UAE); Al Joakar Mohamed; Eissa Alhashmi; Mohamed Al Hashimi	Qatar (QAT); Ahmed Saif; Ali Al Obaidly; Mohsen Bukshaisha

== Medal table ==
* Host nation (Qatar)

Rank	Nation	Gold	Silver	Bronze	Total
1	Jordan	2	0	0	2
2	Iraq	1	2	0	3
3	Kuwait	1	0	1	2
4	Bahrain	1	0	0	1
5	Qatar*	0	2	2	4
6	United Arab Emirates	0	1	1	2
7	Lebanon	0	0	1	1
Totals (7 entries)		5	5	5	15
