= 2008 Six-red Snooker International =

Six-red Snooker International

Tournament information
- Dates: 8–13 July 2008
- Venue: Montien Riverside Hotel
- City: Bangkok
- Country: Thailand
- Organisation: ACBS
- Highest break: 75 (6x)

Final
- Champion: (England) Ricky Walden
- Runner-up: (England) Stuart Bingham
- Score: 8–3

The 2008 Six-red Snooker International (also known as the 2008 SangSom 6-red Snooker International for promotional and marketing purposes) was a six-red snooker tournament that took place between 8 and 13 July 2008 at the Montien Riverside Hotel in Bangkok, Thailand.

Twenty-one of the tournament's 48 competitors were currently on the 2008/09 main tour of the more established 15-reds game, including former world champions Peter Ebdon and Ken Doherty, 2007 finalist Mark Selby and the hugely successful Jimmy White. A relatively high proportion of competitors were from Asia.

== Round-robin stage ==
The top four players from each group qualified for the knock-out stage. All matches were best of 9 frames.

=== Group A ===
POS	Player	MP	MW	FW	FL	FD	PTS
1	(England) Mark Selby	5	4	24	13	+11	4
2	(England) Jimmy White	5	4	21	14	+7	4
3	(England) Martin Gould	5	3	18	18	0	3
4	(India) Aditya Mehta	5	2	20	21	−1	2
5	(Thailand) Issara Kachaiwong	5	1	15	23	−8	1
6	(France) Gregory Kopec	5	1	12	21	−9	1

- Jimmy White 5–0 Martin Gould
- Issara Kachaiwong 2–5 Aditya Mehta
- Mark Selby 5–0 Gregory Kopec
- Jimmy White 1–5 Gregory Kopec
- Issara Kachaiwong 4–5 Martin Gould
- Aditya Mehta 5–4 Gregory Kopec
- Mark Selby 4–5 Jimmy White
- Aditya Mehta 4–5 Martin Gould
- Issara Kachaiwong 4–5 Jimmy White
- Mark Selby 5–3 Martin Gould
- Issara Kachaiwong 5–3 Gregory Kopec
- Mark Selby 5–2 Aditya Mehta
- Mark Selby 5–3 Issara Kachaiwong
- Jimmy White 5–4 Aditya Mehta
- Gregory Kopec 0–5 Martin Gould

=== Group B ===
POS	Player	MP	MW	FW	FL	FD	PTS
1	(England) Peter Ebdon	5	4	23	15	+8	4
2	(Thailand) Thepchaiya Un-Nooh	5	3	23	15	+8	3
3	(Singapore) Keith Boon	5	3	21	18	+3	3
4	(England) Stuart Pettman	5	3	18	16	+2	3
5	(Hong Kong) Au Chi-wai	5	2	12	21	−9	2
6	(India) Yasin Merchant	5	0	13	25	−12	0

- Yasin Merchant 4–5 Keith Boon
- Thepchaiya Un-Nooh 5–0 Au Chi Wai
- Keith Boon 5–0 Stuart Pettman
- Peter Ebdon 5–0 Yasin Merchant
- Thepchaiya Un-Nooh 5–0 Stuart Pettman
- Au Chi Wai 5–2 Keith Boon
- Yasin Merchant 3–5 Stuart Pettman
- Peter Ebdon 5–2 Au Chi Wai
- Peter Ebdon 5–4 Thepchaiya Un-Nooh
- Peter Ebdon 5–4 Keith Boon
- Au Chi Wai 0–5 Stuart Pettman
- Thepchaiya Un-Nooh 5–0 Yasin Merchant
- Peter Ebdon 3–5 Stuart Pettman
- Au Chi Wai 5–4 Yasin Merchant
- Thepchaiya Un-Nooh 4–5 Keith Boon'

=== Group C ===
POS	Player	MP	MW	FW	FL	FD	PTS
1	(England) Mark Davis	5	5	25	9	+16	5
2	(Thailand) Supoj Saenla	5	3	23	14	+9	3
3	(Hong Kong) Chan Wok Ming	5	3	20	15	+5	3
4	(Republic of Ireland) Ken Doherty	5	3	20	17	+3	3
5	(Scotland) Ian Wells	5	2	8	21	−13	2
6	(Vietnam) Nguyen Nat Thanh	5	0	5	25	−20	0

- Nguyen Nat Thanh 1–5 Ian Wells
- Supoj Saenla 5–3 Chan Wok Ming
- Ken Doherty 2–5 Mark Davis
- Supoj Saenla 5–0 Nguyen Nat Thanh
- Chan Wok Ming 5–2 Ian Wells
- Supoj Saenla 5–1 Ian Wells
- Ken Doherty 5–3 Nguyen Nat Thanh
- Chan Wok Ming 2–5 Mark Davis
- Ken Doherty 3–5 Chan Wok Ming
- Nguyen Nat Thanh 1–5 Mark Davis
- Ken Doherty 5–0 Ian Wells
- Nguyen Nat Thanh 0–5 Chan Wok Ming
- Supoj Saenla 4–5 Mark Davis
- Ken Doherty 5–4 Supoj Saenla
- Ian Wells 0–5 Mark Davis

=== Group D ===
POS	Player	MP	MW	FW	FL	FD	PTS
1	(Northern Ireland) Joe Swail	5	4	24	14	+10	4
2	(Thailand) James Wattana	5	4	21	14	+7	4
3	(England) Tom Ford	5	3	23	15	+8	3
4	(New Zealand) Dene O'Kane	5	2	16	21	−5	2
5	(Singapore) Marvin Lim Chun Kiat	5	1	16	24	−8	1
6	(Bahrain) Habib Subah	5	1	12	24	−12	1

- James Wattana 5–2 Habib Subah
- Marvin Lim Chun Kiat 5–4 Tom Ford
- Joe Swail 5–3 Dene O'Kane
- Habib Subah 1–5 Tom Ford
- Joe Swail 5–1 James Wattana
- Dene O'Kane 5–3 Marvin Lim Chun Kiat
- Joe Swail 5–1 Habib Subah
- James Wattana 5–4 Tom Ford
- Habib Subah 3–5 Dene O'Kane
- Joe Swail 5–1 Marvin Lim Chun Kiat
- Habib Subah 5–4 Marvin Lim Chun Kiat
- Joe Swail 4–5 Tom Ford
- James Wattana 5–3 Dene O'Kane
- James Wattana 5–0 Marvin Lim Chun Kiat
- Dene O'Kane 0–5 Tom Ford

=== Group E ===
POS	Player	MP	MW	FW	FL	FD	PTS
1	(Pakistan) Saleh Mohammad	5	5	25	11	+14	5
2	(England) Mike Dunn	5	3	19	15	+4	3
3	(Thailand) Atthasit Mahitthi	5	3	19	16	+3	3
4	(England) Stuart Bingham	5	3	20	18	+2	3
5	(United Arab Emirates) Mohammed Al Joker	5	1	17	24	−7	1
6	(Myanmar) Zaw Tun	5	0	9	25	−16	0

- Stuart Bingham 5–1 Zaw Tun
- Saleh Mohammad 5–3 Mike Dunn
- Atthasit Mahitthi 5–2 Zaw Tun
- Stuart Bingham 5–3 Mohammed Al Joker
- Atthasit Mahitthi 0–5 Saleh Mohammad
- Mohammed Al Joker 2–5 Mike Dunn
- Zaw Tun 0–5 Saleh Mohammad
- Stuart Bingham 4–5 Saleh Mohammad
- Zaw Tun 4–5 Mohammed Al Joker
- Atthasit Mahitthi 5–1 Mike Dunn
- Zaw Tun 2–5 Mike Dunn
- Atthasit Mahitthi 5–3 Mohammed Al Joker
- Stuart Bingham 1–5 Mike Dunn
- Saleh Mohammad 5–4 Mohammed Al Joker
- Stuart Bingham 5–4 Atthasit Mahitthi

=== Group F ===
POS	Player	MP	MW	FW	FL	FD	PTS
1	(England) Nigel Bond	5	4	23	13	+10	4
2	(Thailand) Noppadon Noppachorn	5	3	22	17	+5	3
3	(Australia) Steve Mifsud	5	3	20	17	+3	3
4	(England) Jimmy Michie	5	3	18	16	+2	3
5	(Qatar) Mohsen Abdullah Aziz	5	2	18	18	0	2
6	(Japan) Yutaka Fukuda	5	0	5	25	−20	0

- Noppadon Noppachorn 5–3 Mohsen Abdullah Aziz
- Nigel Bond 5–2 Yutaka Fukuda
- Steve Mifsud 3–5 Jimmy Michie
- Noppadon Noppachorn 5–3 Jimmy Michie
- Steve Mifsud 5–3 Mohsen Abdullah Aziz
- Yutaka Fukuda 0–5 Mohsen Abdullah Aziz
- Nigel Bond 5–4 Noppadon Noppachorn
- Steve Mifsud 5–1 Yutaka Fukuda
- Mohsen Abdullah Aziz 2–5 Jimmy Michie
- Nigel Bond 5–0 Jimmy Michie
- Noppadon Noppachorn 3–5 Steve Mifsud
- Nigel Bond 5–2 Steve Mifsud
- Yutaka Fukuda 1–5 Jimmy Michie
- Nigel Bond 3–5 Mohsen Abdullah Aziz
- Noppadon Noppachorn 5–1 Yutaka Fukuda

=== Group G ===
POS	Player	MP	MW	FW	FL	FD	PTS
1	(Thailand) Phaitoon Phonbun	5	4	23	15	+8	4
2	(England) Ricky Walden	5	4	22	14	+8	4
3	(India) Manan Chandra	5	2	17	19	−2	2
4	(England) Matthew Selt	5	2	17	20	−3	2
5	(United Arab Emirates) Mohammed Shehab	5	2	14	20	−6	2
6	(Thailand) Akani Songsermsawad	5	1	17	22	−5	1

- Manan Chandra 2–5 Ricky Walden
- Akani Songsermsawat 5–2 Matthew Selt
- Phaitoon Phonbun 5–1 Mohammed Shehab
- Matthew Selt 5–2 Manan Chandra
- Akani Songsermsawat 3–5 Ricky Walden
- Phaitoon Phonbun 5–4 Akani Songsermsawat
- Matthew Selt 1–5 Mohammed Shehab
- Matthew Selt 4–5 Ricky Walden
- Phaitoon Phonbun 5–3 Manan Chandra
- Akani Songsermsawat 4–5 Mohammed Shehab
- Phaitoon Phonbun 5–2 Ricky Walden
- Mohammed Shehab 0–5 Ricky Walden
- Akani Songsermsawat 1–5 Manan Chandra
- Phaitoon Phonbun 4–5 Matthew Selt
- Manan Chandra 5–3 Mohammed Shehab

=== Group H ===
POS	Player	MP	MW	FW	FL	FD	PTS
1	(England) Dave Harold	5	4	22	11	+11	4
2	(Wales) Daniel Wells	5	4	24	14	+10	4
3	(Germany) Itaro Santos	5	2	19	20	−1	2
4	(England) Michael Holt	5	2	18	21	−3	2
5	(Thailand) Suchart Phookang	5	2	15	21	−6	2
6	(Pakistan) Muhammad Sajjad	5	1	12	23	−11	1

- Itaro Santos 5–3 Muhammad Sajjad
- Dave Harold 5–4 Daniel Wells
- Suchart Phookang 5–3 Michael Holt
- Daniel Wells 5–2 Michael Holt
- Suchart Phookang 5–3 Muhammad Sajjad
- Suchart Phookang 3–5 Daniel Wells
- Muhammad Sajjad 5–3 Michael Holt
- Dave Harold 5–2 Itaro Santos
- Itaro Santos 3–5 Daniel Wells
- Dave Harold 5–0 Suchart Phookang
- Dave Harold 5–0 Muhammad Sajjad
- Suchart Phookang 2–5 Itaro Santos
- Dave Harold 2–5 Michael Holt
- Muhammad Sajjad 1–5 Daniel Wells
- Itaro Santos 4–5 Michael Holt

== Knockout stage ==
Last 32; Best of 11 frames
(England) Mark Davis	4
(India) Aditya Mehta	6
(England) Tom Ford	4
(England) Ricky Walden	6
(England) Mike Dunn	6
(Germany) Itaro Santos	4
(England) Jimmy Michie	6
(England) Peter Ebdon	2
(England) Nigel Bond	6
(England) Stuart Pettman	2
(India) Manan Chandra	6
(Wales) Daniel Wells	3
(Thailand) James Wattana	6
(Thailand) Atthasit Mahitthi	3
(Republic of Ireland) Ken Doherty	6
(England) Mark Selby	3
(England) Dave Harold	3
(England) Matthew Selt	6
(England) Martin Gould	6
(Thailand) Thepchaiya Un-Nooh	4
(Australia) Steve Mifsud	1
(Thailand) Supoj Saenla	6
(England) Stuart Bingham	6
(Northern Ireland) Joe Swail	4
(Thailand) Phaitoon Phonbun	3
(England) Michael Holt	6
(Singapore) Keith Boon	6
(England) Jimmy White	3
(Thailand) Noppadon Noppachorn	6
(Hong Kong) Chan Wok Ming	1
(New Zealand) Dene O'Kane	1
(Pakistan) Saleh Mohammad	6

Last 16; Best of 11 frames
(India) Aditya Mehta	1
(England) Ricky Walden	6
(England) Mike Dunn	1
(England) Jimmy Michie	6
(England) Nigel Bond	6
(India) Manan Chandra	3
(Thailand) James Wattana	6
(Republic of Ireland) Ken Doherty	2
(England) Matthew Selt	5
(England) Martin Gould	6
(Thailand) Supoj Saenla	2
(England) Stuart Bingham	6
(England) Michael Holt	6
(Singapore) Keith Boon	5
(Thailand) Noppadon Noppachorn	4
(Pakistan) Saleh Mohammad	6

Quarter-finals; Best of 13 frames
(England) Ricky Walden	7
(England) Jimmy Michie	5
(England) Nigel Bond	6
(Thailand) James Wattana	7
(England) Martin Gould	3
(England) Stuart Bingham	7
(England) Michael Holt	7
(Pakistan) Saleh Mohammad	3

Semi-finals; Best of 13 frames
(England) Ricky Walden	7
(Thailand) James Wattana	6
(England) Stuart Bingham	7
(England) Michael Holt	3

Final; Best of 15 frames
(England) Ricky Walden	8
(England) Stuart Bingham	3

== Maximum breaks ==
(Note: a maximum break in six-red snooker is 75.)

- Saleh Mohammad (2 minutes 54 seconds)
- Mike Dunn (3 minutes 1 seconds)
- Michael Holt (3 minutes 31 seconds)
- Michael Holt (3 minutes 32 seconds)
- Mark Selby (3 minutes 42 seconds)
- Mohammed Shehab (4 minutes 13 seconds)
