= Myanmar at the 2009 Asian Indoor Games =

- IOC code: MYA
- NOC: Myanmar Olympic Committee

in Hanoi
- Competitors: 2 in 1 sport

Asian Indoor Games appearances
- 2005; 2007; 2009; 2013; 2017; 2021; 2025

Myanmar participated in the 2009 Asian Indoor Games in Hanoi, Vietnam on 30 October – 8 November 2009. Myanmar sent a delegation of 2 competitors in the sport of billiards.

== Cue sports ==
Athlete	Events
Kyaw Oo	Billiards
Aung Htay	Billiards
