= Bahrain at the 2009 Asian Indoor Games =

Competitor in an Asian indoor sporting event

- IOC code: BRN
- NOC: Bahrain Olympic Committee

in Hanoi
- Competitors: 27 in 5 sports
- Medals Ranked 22nd: Gold 1 Silver 3 Bronze 1 Total 5

Asian Indoor Games appearances
- 2005; 2007; 2009; 2013; 2017; 2021; 2025

Bahrain participated in the 2009 Asian Indoor Games in Hanoi, Vietnam on 30 October – 8 November 2009.

== Medal winners ==
Medal	Name	Sport	Event	Date
Gold	Tejitu Daba Chalchissa	Athletics	Women's Track 3.000m	
Silver	Alemu Bekele Gebre	Athletics	Men's Track 1.500m	
Silver	Alemu Bekele Gebre	Athletics	Men's Track 3.000m	
Silver	Mimi Belete	Athletics	Women's Track 1.500m	
Bronze	Gladys Jerotich Kibiwot	Athletics	Women's Track 3.000m	
