= Rafath Habib =

Indian cue sports player

Personal information
- Nationality: Indian
- Born: September 5, 1970

Sport
- Country: India
- Sport: Cue sports
Medal record
Cue sports
Representing India
Cue sports at the 2002 Asian Games
Gold medal – first place	2002 Busan	Doubles snooker
World Team Snooker Championship
Silver medal – second place	2016	Team snooker
Silver medal – second place	2019	Team snooker
Seven Nations Team Snooker Championship
Bronze medal – third place	2006 Dubai	Team snooker

Rafath Habib (also spelled Rafat Habib; born 5 September 1970) is an Indian cue sports player who competes in snooker, billiards, and pool. He represents India internationally and the Indian Railways in domestic competitions. He won gold in doubles snooker at the 2002 Asian Games and silver medals at the 2016 and 2019 World Team Snooker Championships.

== Career ==
Habib began playing cue sports under the guidance of his father, Syed Habib.

=== International competitions ===
At the 2002 Asian Games in Busan, South Korea, Habib won a gold medal in doubles snooker. He previously placed fifth at both the 1991 Under-21 World Snooker Championship and the 1997 Asian Snooker Championship in Dubai.

In 2006, Habib was a member of the Indian team that won a bronze medal at the Seven Nations Team Snooker Championship in Dubai. He has also competed in senior World Snooker Championships and Asian professional-circuit events in China and Pakistan.

Habib played on the Indian teams that won silver medals at the World Team Snooker Championships in 2016 (partnering with Dharminder Lilly) and 2019 (partnering with Anuj Uppal).

=== National competitions ===
In June 2008, Habib won his first national 9-ball pool title at the National Championships in Kolkata, defeating Sumeet Talwar of Chandigarh 11–5 in the final. He also finished third in the 8-ball event.

In April 2009, Habib defeated Yasin Merchant 4–0 at the HSBC Premier–Shyam Shroff Memorial Open Invitation Snooker Tournament at Khar Gymkhana in Mumbai. In June 2009, He won the Poona Club–Manisha Open and Invitational Snooker Championship, defeating Manish Jain 4–2 in the final. Habib won the Indian National 9-Ball Pool Championship in 2008 and placed third in the 8-ball event. In 2011, he was the runner-up in the national 9-ball championship and placed eighth in the National Snooker Championship.

During the National Pool Championships in Delhi in February 2010, Habib entered as the reigning national 9-ball champion and qualified for the knockout stages after defeating Dipayan Kothari 5–1.

In March 2013, Habib won the RKG Snooker Masters North Zone Championship in New Delhi. He defeated Sundeep Gulati 5–4 in the final, winning the deciding frame 64–59 to qualify for the main RKG Snooker Masters tournament in Mumbai.

At the third Master's National Snooker Championship in 2019, Habib recorded 3–1 group stage victories over Maharashtra's Amit Sapru and Sanjiv Shah.

In April 2026, he reached the pre-quarterfinals of the IBSF World Billiards Championship in Ireland, losing to Pankaj Advani 951–283.

== Personal life ==
Habib was born on 5 September 1970 and is from Chennai, Tamil Nadu. He is the son of former Indian snooker player Syed Habib, who was ranked No. 2 nationally.
