= Thamer Kamal Ali =

Qatari middle-distance runner

Medal record

Men's athletics

Representing Qatar

Asian Indoor Championships
Gold medal – first place	2008 Doha	1500 m

Thamer Kamal Ali (born 12 November 1988) is a Qatari middle distance runner who specializes in the 1500 metres.

He first specialized in the steeplechase. He finished ninth at the 2005 World Youth Championships, ninth at the 2006 World Junior Championships and fifth at the 2006 Asian Games. He then competed in the 1500 metres at the 2008 World Indoor Championships and the 2008 Olympic Games without progressing to the second round. He is coached by the Italian Renato Canova.

His personal best times are:

- 1500 metres - 3:35.56 min (2008)
- 3000 metres - 7:51.61 min (2007)
- 5000 metres - 13:47.41 min (2010)
- 3000 metres steeplechase - 8:20.29 min (2006)
- 10,000 metres - 29:06.1 min (2007)
