= Saudi Arabia at the 2009 Asian Indoor Games =

- IOC code: KSA
- NOC: Saudi Arabian Olympic Committee

in Hanoi
- Competitors: 44 in 6 sports
- Medals Ranked 12th: Gold 4 Silver 3 Bronze 2 Total 9

Asian Indoor Games appearances
- 2007; 2009; 2013; 2017; 2021; 2025

Saudi Arabia participated in the 2009 Asian Indoor Games in Hanoi, Vietnam on 30 October – 8 November 2009.

== Medals ==
Medal	Name	Sport	Event	Date
Gold	Mohammed Alqaree	Athletics	Men's Combined Event Heptathlon	
Gold	Ahmed bin Marzouq	Athletics	Men's Field Long jump	Nov 1
Gold	Adel Mahbub; Bandar Sharahili; Edrees Hawsawi; Ismail Alsabani; Mohammed Albishi; Yousef Masrahi	Athletics	Men's Team Track 4 × 400 m Relay	Nov 2
Gold	Ismail Alsabani	Athletics	Men's Track 400m	Nov 1
Silver	Yousef Masrahi	Athletics	Men's Track 400m	Nov 1
Silver	Yasir Alnashri	Athletics	Men's Track 60m	Oct 31
Silver	Ayman Almuwallad; Faisl Aldawsari; Hani Almohammed; Jaber Kabe	3 on 3 Basketball	Men's Team 3 on 3 Basketball	
Bronze	Sultan Alhabshi	Athletics	Men's Field Shot put	Nov 2
Bronze	Sami Alhaydar	Athletics	Men's Track 60m Hurdles	Nov 1
