= European Tour 2012/2013 – Event 3 =

Betfair European Tour 2012/2013 Event 3

Tournament information
- Dates: 17–21 October 2012
- Venue: Lotto Arena
- City: Antwerp
- Country: Belgium
- Organisation: World Snooker
- Format: Minor-ranking event
- Total prize fund: €70,000
- Winner's share: €12,000
- Highest break: Stuart Bingham (ENG) (142)

Final
- Champion: Mark Allen (NIR)
- Runner-up: Mark Selby (ENG)
- Score: 4–1

The Betfair European Tour 2012/2013 – Event 3 (also known as the 2012 Acuerate Antwerp Open and 2012 Belgian Open) was a professional minor-ranking snooker tournament that took place between 17 and 21 October 2012 at the Lotto Arena in Antwerp, Belgium.

Judd Trump was the defending champion, but he lost in the last 64 2–4 against Jack Lisowski.

Mark Allen won his third professional title by defeating Mark Selby 4–1 in the final. Allen made three consecutive century breaks.

== Prize fund and ranking points ==
The breakdown of prize money and ranking points of the event is shown below:

	Prize fund	Ranking points^{1}
Winner	€12,000	2,000
Runner-up	€6,000	1,600
Semi-finalist	€3,000	1,280
Quarter-finalist	€2,000	1,000
Last 16	€1,250	760
Last 32	€750	560
Last 64	€500	360
Total	€70,000	–

- ^{1} Only professional players can earn ranking points.

== Main draw ==
=== Preliminary rounds ===
==== Round 1 ====
Best of 7 frames

(England) Liam Monk	4–0	(Belgium) Sam de Cooman
(Belgium) Jurian Heusdens	4–0	(Belgium) Philippe Dhaens
(Belgium) Jürgen Vandenbossche	4–0	(Netherlands) Mario Wehrmann
(France) Jean-Baptiste Erceau	2–4	(England) Greg Davis
(England) Gary Steele	0–4	(Belgium) Hans Blanckaert
(England) John Parkin	4–1	(Belgium) Tsie Waa Ip
(Belgium) Rene Hemelsoet	1–4	(England) Ricky Norris
(Belgium) Luc Heirewegh	w/o–w/d	(Scotland) Robert Stevenson
(England) Chris Norbury	4–1	(Belgium) Patrick Geysels
(Belgium) Edwin Depoorter	4–1	(Belgium) Pierre Dethier
(England) Elliot Slessor	4–0	(Belgium) Bart Van Der Haegen
(Belgium) Tim Van Goubergen	4–1	(Belgium) Steven Heyselberghs
(Belgium) Marc Vrancken	1–4	(Belgium) Raphael Profeta
(Belgium) Sybren Sokolowski	1–4	(Belgium) Jan Corten
(Belgium) Pascal Durnez	4–0	(Belgium) Cedric Daniels
(England) Justin Astley	4–0	(Belgium) Jürgen Vancanneyt
(Belgium) Jimmy Van Den Winkel	4–1	(Belgium) Paul Van Welssenaers
(France) Regis D'Anna	w/o–w/d	(Belgium) Steve Wensch
(Belgium) Tino De Witte	2–4	(England) Reanne Evans
(England) Nick Jennings	4–0	(Belgium) Pieter Vanassche
(England) Ryan Causton	4–1	(Belgium) Marc Malot
(Belgium) Serge Moeyersons	4–3	(Belgium) Wim De Roeck
(Belgium) Jürgen Van Roy	4–1	(Belgium) Ward Van Doren
(Scotland) Marc Davis	w/o–w/d	(Wales) Kishan Hirani
(England) Sydney Wilson	4–0	(Belgium) Tom Vanwelssenaers
(Netherlands) Ton Berkhout	4–0	(Wales) Alex Taubman
(Netherlands) Roy Stolk	3–4	(England) Lee Page
(England) Terry Challenger	0–4	(England) Ian Glover
(Belgium) Steve Lambrechts	4–1	(Belgium) Daan Van De Parre
(Belgium) Alain Van Der Steen	2–4	(Northern Ireland) Jordan Brown
(Belgium) Pascal Raes	3–4	(England) Dean Goddard
(Wales) Gareth Allen	w/o–w/d	(Belgium) Dieter Raymakers
(England) Ben Harrison	4–2	(Belgium) Tom de Wit
(Belgium) Stein de Sterck	0–4	(England) Adam Wicheard

(Belgium) Bruno Menegotto	0–4	(Belgium) Thomas Broeckx
(Belgium) Kasra Khavaran	2–4	(Belgium) Dominiek Vieuvalet
(England) Mark Vincent	4–0	(Netherlands) Jasha Kiers
(Netherlands) Gerrit bij de Leij	w/o–w/d	(Pakistan) Shahram Changezi
(Belgium) Dirk Coppens	1–4	(Belgium) Yvan Van Velthoven
(Belgium) Mario Van Herk	2–4	(Germany) Felix Frede
(Belgium) Sebastiaan Vermeylen	4–1	(Netherlands) Maurice Le Duc
(Belgium) Christiaan Corten	0–4	(Belgium) Koang Min Chou
(England) Sam Harvey	4–0	(Netherlands) Joris Maas
(Belgium) Wan Chooi Tan	2–4	(Netherlands) Juriaan Van Den Nieuwenhuizen
(Netherlands) Peter Bertens	0–4	(France) Johan Lorek
(Belgium) Hans Coppens	1–4	(Belgium) Raf Van De Maele
(England) Oliver Brown	4–1	(Netherlands) Jeroen Van Driel
(England) Craig Barber	4–1	(Belgium) Johan Somers
(Belgium) Andy Van Landeghem	w/o–w/d	(Republic of Ireland) Josh Boileau
(Belgium) Tomasz Skalski	4–0	(Wales) Jack Bradford
(Belgium) Raf Vervoort	2–4	(England) Matthew Day
(Belgium) Peter Bullen	1–4	(England) Kyren Wilson
(Republic of Ireland) Joe Delaney	w/d–w/o	(Netherlands) Jerom Meeus
(England) Oliver Lines	4–0	(Germany) Lukas Kleckers
(Belgium) Jan Goossens	0–4	(England) Stuart Carrington
(France) Yannick Poulain	4–0	(Belgium) Kevin Van Den Broeck
(Belgium) Kevin Van Hove	1–4	(England) James Cahill
(Belgium) Peter Vertommen	4–0	(France) Philippe Broto
(France) Nathanael Beckrich	4–1	(Belgium) Fred Letecheur
(Netherlands) Maurice Rijk	w/o–w/d	(India) David Singh
(England) Mitchell Mann	4–0	(Belgium) Tobias De Bock
(England) Stuart Wood	4–2	(Belgium) Kevin Vandevoort
(Belgium) Kristof Vermeiren	4–1	(Belgium) Glenn Van Hulle
(Belgium) Rudy Poelmans	1–4	(England) Jeff Cundy
(France) Stéphane Ochoïski	4–3	(France) Nicolas Schianchi
(Poland) Kacper Filipiak	4–1	(Belgium) Davy Wittoeck
(England) Christopher Keogan	4–0	(Belgium) Luc Blancke

==== Round 2 ====
Best of 7 frames

(England) Liam Monk	1–4	(Belgium) Jurian Heusdens
(Belgium) Jürgen Vandenbossche	4–0	(England) Greg Davis
(Belgium) Hans Blanckaert	4–2	(England) John Parkin
(England) Ricky Norris	4–3	(Belgium) Luc Heirewegh
(England) Chris Norbury	4–1	(Belgium) Edwin Depoorter
(England) Elliot Slessor	4–0	(Belgium) Tim Van Goubergen
(Belgium) Raphael Profeta	4–2	(Belgium) Jan Corten
(Belgium) Pascal Durnez	0–4	(England) Justin Astley
(Belgium) Erwin Goethals	4–0	(Belgium) Jimmy Van Den Winkel
(France) Regis D'Anna	0–4	(England) Reanne Evans
(England) Nick Jennings	3–4	(England) Ryan Causton
(Belgium) Serge Moeyersons	0–4	(Belgium) Jürgen Van Roy
(Scotland) Marc Davis	3–4	(England) Sydney Wilson
(Netherlands) Ton Berkhout	0–4	(England) Lee Page
(Belgium) Jeff Jacobs	1–4	(England) Ian Glover
(Belgium) Steve Lambrechts	1–4	(Northern Ireland) Jordan Brown
(England) Dean Goddard	2–4	(Wales) Gareth Allen
(England) Ben Harrison	4–3	(England) Adam Wicheard

(Belgium) Thomas Broeckx	4–0	(Belgium) Dominiek Vieuvalet
(England) Joe Steele	4–1	(England) Mark Vincent
(Belgium) Xavier Pemmerl	0–4	(Netherlands) Gerrit bij de Leij
(Belgium) Yvan Van Velthoven	4–0	(Germany) Felix Frede
(Belgium) Sebastiaan Vermeylen	4–2	(Belgium) Koang Min Chou
(England) Sam Harvey	4–0	(Netherlands) Juriaan Van Den Nieuwenhuizen
(France) Johan Lorek	2–4	(Belgium) Raf Van De Maele
(Belgium) Jos Voets	2–4	(England) Oliver Brown
(England) Craig Barber	4–0	(Belgium) Andy Van Landeghem
(Belgium) Tomasz Skalski	4–3	(England) Matthew Day
(England) Kyren Wilson	4–0	(Netherlands) Jerom Meeus
(England) Oliver Lines	2–4	(England) Stuart Carrington
(France) Yannick Poulain	2–4	(England) James Cahill
(Belgium) Peter Vertommen	4–2	(France) Nathanael Beckrich
(Netherlands) Maurice Rijk	0–4	(England) Mitchell Mann
(England) Stuart Wood	3–4	(Belgium) Kristof Vermeiren
(England) Jeff Cundy	4–1	(France) Stéphane Ochoïski
(Poland) Kacper Filipiak	2–4	(England) Christopher Keogan

=== Main rounds ===
==== Top half ====
===== Section 1 =====
Last 128; Best of 7 frames
(England) Mark Selby	4
(Belgium) Jurian Heusdens	0
(England) Mark Davis	4
(Belgium) Jürgen Vandenbossche	0
(Wales) Ryan Day	4
(Belgium) Hans Blanckaert	3
(England) Dave Harold	4
(Malta) Tony Drago	0
(England) Paul Davison	4
(England) Ricky Norris	2
(England) Michael Wild	2
(England) Joel Walker	4
(China) Cao Yupeng	w/d
(England) Chris Norbury	w/o
(Scotland) Marcus Campbell	3
(Thailand) Thanawat Thirapongpaiboon	4

Last 64; Best of 7 frames
(England) Mark Selby	4
(England) Mark Davis	1
(Wales) Ryan Day	4
(England) Dave Harold	1
(England) Paul Davison	4
(England) Joel Walker	3
(England) Chris Norbury	4
(Thailand) Thanawat Thirapongpaiboon	3

Last 32; Best of 7 frames
(England) Mark Selby	4
(Wales) Ryan Day	0
(England) Paul Davison	4
(England) Chris Norbury	3

Last 16; Best of 7 frames
(England) Mark Selby	4
(England) Paul Davison	3

===== Section 2 =====
Last 128; Best of 7 frames
(England) Peter Lines	0
(Hong Kong) Marco Fu	4
(England) Craig Steadman	2
(England) Elliot Slessor	4
(England) David Gilbert	3
(England) Sean O'Sullivan	4
(England) Rory McLeod	3
(England) Jimmy Robertson	4
(England) John Astley	w/o
(Belgium) Raphael Profeta	w/d
(England) Nigel Bond	3
(England) Justin Astley	4
(England) Gary Wilson	4
(Northern Ireland) Gerard Greene	3
(Wales) Michael White	4
(Belgium) Erwin Goethals	0

Last 64; Best of 7 frames
(Hong Kong) Marco Fu	4
(England) Elliot Slessor	0
(England) Sean O'Sullivan	2
(England) Jimmy Robertson	4
(England) John Astley	4
(England) Justin Astley	3
(England) Gary Wilson	3
(Wales) Michael White	4

Last 32; Best of 7 frames
(Hong Kong) Marco Fu	4
(England) Jimmy Robertson	2
(England) John Astley	1
(Wales) Michael White	4

Last 16; Best of 7 frames
(Hong Kong) Marco Fu	4
(Wales) Michael White	1

===== Section 3 =====
Last 128; Best of 7 frames
(England) Barry Hawkins	4
(England) Reanne Evans	1
(England) Andrew Norman	0
(Scotland) Anthony McGill	4
(England) Ali Carter	4
(England) Ryan Causton	0
(England) Jamie Cope	4
(Belgium) Jürgen Van Roy	0
(England) Rod Lawler	4
(England) Sydney Wilson	2
(England) Ricky Walden	w/o
(England) Andy Hicks	w/d
(England) Michael Holt	4
(England) Steve Davis	3
(Scotland) John Higgins	4
(England) Lee Page	0

Last 64; Best of 7 frames
(England) Barry Hawkins	4
(Scotland) Anthony McGill	2
(England) Ali Carter	4
(England) Jamie Cope	1
(England) Rod Lawler	1
(England) Ricky Walden	4
(England) Michael Holt	1
(Scotland) John Higgins	4

Last 32; Best of 7 frames
(England) Barry Hawkins	2
(England) Ali Carter	4
(England) Ricky Walden	1
(Scotland) John Higgins	4

Last 16; Best of 7 frames
(England) Ali Carter	4
(Scotland) John Higgins	3

===== Section 4 =====
Last 128; Best of 7 frames
(England) Anthony Hamilton	4
(Scotland) Michael Leslie	0
(Scotland) Jamie Burnett	4
(England) Michael Wasley	2
(England) Liam Highfield	4
(England) Ian Glover	2
(England) Joe Perry	4
(England) Mike Dunn	2
(Wales) Jamie Jones	0
(England) Matthew Selt	4
(England) Shaun Murphy	2
(China) Ding Junhui	4
(England) Jack Lisowski	4
(England) Jamie O'Neill	1
(England) Judd Trump	4
(Thailand) Passakorn Suwannawat	2

Last 64; Best of 7 frames
(England) Anthony Hamilton	4
(Scotland) Jamie Burnett	2
(England) Liam Highfield	1
(England) Joe Perry	4
(England) Matthew Selt	4
(China) Ding Junhui	1
(England) Jack Lisowski	4
(England) Judd Trump	2

Last 32; Best of 7 frames
(England) Anthony Hamilton	3
(England) Joe Perry	4
(England) Matthew Selt	0
(England) Jack Lisowski	4

Last 16; Best of 7 frames
(England) Joe Perry	4
(England) Jack Lisowski	3

==== Bottom half ====
===== Section 5 =====
Last 128; Best of 7 frames
(Northern Ireland) Joe Swail	4
(Northern Ireland) Jordan Brown	3
(England) Alfred Burden	4
(Wales) Gareth Allen	2
(England) Ian Burns	4
(England) Ben Harrison	2
(England) Mark King	4
(Belgium) Thomas Broeckx	0
(Australia) Neil Robertson	4
(England) Joe Steele	0
(England) Jimmy White	2
(Wales) Daniel Wells	4
(Wales) Jak Jones	2
(Norway) Kurt Maflin	4
(England) Allan Taylor	4
(Netherlands) Gerrit bij de Leij	1

Last 64; Best of 7 frames
(Northern Ireland) Joe Swail	3
(England) Alfred Burden	4
(England) Ian Burns	3
(England) Mark King	4
(Australia) Neil Robertson	4
(Wales) Daniel Wells	2
(Norway) Kurt Maflin	4
(England) Allan Taylor	0

Last 32; Best of 7 frames
(England) Alfred Burden	4
(England) Mark King	1
(Australia) Neil Robertson	4
(Norway) Kurt Maflin	3

Last 16; Best of 7 frames
(England) Alfred Burden	3
(Australia) Neil Robertson	4

===== Section 6 =====
Last 128; Best of 7 frames
(Thailand) James Wattana	w/d
(Belgium) Yvan Van Velthoven	w/o
(Thailand) Thepchaiya Un-Nooh	4
(Belgium) Sebastiaan Vermeylen	0
(England) David Grace	0
(China) Tian Pengfei	4
(England) Simon Bedford	4
(England) Sam Harvey	2
(Wales) Andrew Pagett	4
(Belgium) Raf Van De Maele	0
(England) Robbie Williams	4
(England) Martin O'Donnell	3
(Belgium) Luca Brecel	4
(England) Oliver Brown	2
(England) Stuart Bingham	4
(England) Craig Barber	0

Last 64; Best of 7 frames
(Belgium) Yvan Van Velthoven	0
(Thailand) Thepchaiya Un-Nooh	4
(China) Tian Pengfei	4
(England) Simon Bedford	3
(Wales) Andrew Pagett	4
(England) Robbie Williams	0
(Belgium) Luca Brecel	1
(England) Stuart Bingham	4

Last 32; Best of 7 frames
(Thailand) Thepchaiya Un-Nooh	4
(China) Tian Pengfei	3
(Wales) Andrew Pagett	4
(England) Stuart Bingham	2

Last 16; Best of 7 frames
(Thailand) Thepchaiya Un-Nooh	2
(Wales) Andrew Pagett	4

===== Section 7 =====
Last 128; Best of 7 frames
(Scotland) Alan McManus	4
(England) Barry Pinches	0
(Wales) Mark Williams	4
(England) Adam Duffy	2
(Wales) Matthew Stevens	2
(Scotland) Graeme Dott	4
(England) Andrew Higginson	4
(Belgium) Tomasz Skalski	3
(Northern Ireland) Mark Allen	4
(England) Kyren Wilson	1
(Germany) Phil Barnes	2
(England) Stuart Carrington	4
(Wales) Dominic Dale	w/d
(England) Peter Ebdon	w/o
(England) Robert Milkins	3
(England) James Cahill	4

Last 64; Best of 7 frames
(Scotland) Alan McManus	1
(Wales) Mark Williams	4
(Scotland) Graeme Dott	4
(England) Andrew Higginson	0
(Northern Ireland) Mark Allen	4
(England) Stuart Carrington	1
(England) Peter Ebdon	4
(England) James Cahill	0

Last 32; Best of 7 frames
(Wales) Mark Williams	2
(Scotland) Graeme Dott	4
(Northern Ireland) Mark Allen	4
(England) Peter Ebdon	2

Last 16; Best of 7 frames
(Scotland) Graeme Dott	2
(Northern Ireland) Mark Allen	4

===== Section 8 =====
Last 128; Best of 7 frames
(England) Stephen Lee	w/d
(India) Aditya Mehta	w/o
(Thailand) Dechawat Poomjaeng	4
(Republic of Ireland) Fergal O'Brien	2
(England) Ben Woollaston	4
(Belgium) Peter Vertommen	0
(China) Liang Wenbo	1
(England) Mitchell Mann	4
(Scotland) Scott Donaldson	4
(Belgium) Kristof Vermeiren	0
(Republic of Ireland) Ken Doherty	4
(England) Jeff Cundy	3
(England) Mark Joyce	1
(England) Tom Ford	4
(England) Martin Gould	3
(England) Christopher Keogan	4

Last 64; Best of 7 frames
(India) Aditya Mehta	3
(Thailand) Dechawat Poomjaeng	4
(England) Ben Woollaston	4
(England) Mitchell Mann	2
(Scotland) Scott Donaldson	2
(Republic of Ireland) Ken Doherty	4
(England) Tom Ford	4
(England) Christopher Keogan	1

Last 32; Best of 7 frames
(Thailand) Dechawat Poomjaeng	1
(England) Ben Woollaston	4
(Republic of Ireland) Ken Doherty	0
(England) Tom Ford	4

Last 16; Best of 7 frames
(England) Ben Woollaston	4
(England) Tom Ford	2

==== Finals ====
Quarter-finals; Best of 7 frames		Semi-finals; Best of 7 frames		Final; Best of 7 frames
(England) Mark Selby	4
(Hong Kong) Marco Fu	0	(England) Mark Selby	4
(England) Ali Carter	4	(England) Ali Carter	0
(England) Joe Perry	1			(England) Mark Selby	1
(Australia) Neil Robertson	3			(Northern Ireland) Mark Allen	4
(Wales) Andrew Pagett	4	(Wales) Andrew Pagett	1
(Northern Ireland) Mark Allen	4	(Northern Ireland) Mark Allen	4
(England) Ben Woollaston	3

== Century breaks ==
- 142, 108, 101 – Stuart Bingham
- 138 – John Astley
- 136 – Ian Burns
- 135 – Fergal O'Brien
- 131, 116, 101 – Mark Selby
- 131, 116 – Marco Fu
- 127 – Rod Lawler
- 127 – Tom Ford
- 125, 104, 102, 100 – Neil Robertson
- 125, 104 – Ben Woollaston
- 125 – Liam Monk
- 122, 111, 109, 104 – Ali Carter
- 118 – Marcus Campbell
- 117, 106, 105, 102, 100 – Mark Allen
- 117 – Passakorn Suwannawat
- 116 – Jack Lisowski
- 115, 101 – Alfie Burden
- 115 – Gareth Allen
- 114, 100 – Joe Perry
- 113, 106 – Michael Holt
- 112 – Liang Wenbo
- 111 – Matthew Stevens
- 109 – Simon Bedford
- 107 – Thepchaiya Un-Nooh
- 106 – Michael White
- 106 – Graeme Dott
- 105 – Daniel Wells
- 104 – Jordan Brown
- 104 – Jamie Burnett
- 104 – Ding Junhui
- 103 – Jimmy Robertson
- 103 – Robbie Williams
- 100 – Ryan Day
- 100 – John Higgins
- 100 – Ricky Walden
- 100 – Anthony Hamilton
- 100 – Mark Davis
