= Euro Players Tour Championship 2010/2011 – Event 1 =

Euro Players Tour Championship 2010/2011 Event 1
Tournament information
- Dates: 26–29 August 2010
- Venue: Stadthalle
- City: Fürth
- Country: Germany
- Organisation: World Snooker
- Format: Minor-ranking event
- Total prize fund: €50,000
- Winner's share: €10,000
- Highest break: Barry Hawkins (ENG) (143)

Final
- Champion: Judd Trump (ENG)
- Runner-up: Anthony Hamilton (ENG)
- Score: 4–3

The Euro Players Tour Championship 2010/2011 – Event 1 (also known as the 2010 Paul Hunter Classic) was a professional minor-ranking snooker tournament that took place between 26 and 29 August 2010 in Fürth, Germany.

Judd Trump won in the final 4–3 against Anthony Hamilton.

== Prize fund and ranking points ==
The breakdown of prize money and ranking points of the event is shown below:
A non ranking EPTC Plate Trophy was added to European PTC's for player that went out early to get a trophy and money that would not count towards the rankings.

	Prize fund	Ranking points^{1}
Winner	€10,000	2,000
Runner-up	€5,000	1,600
Semi-finalist	€2,500	1,280
Quarter-finalist	€1,400	1,000
Last 16	€1,000	760
Last 32	€500	560
Last 64	€200	360
Plate Winner	€1,500	–
Plate Runner-up	€500	–
Total	€50,000	–

- ^{1} Only professional players can earn ranking points.
- A new non-ranking EPTC Plate Trophy was added for the player than exited the main event early.
- The prize money earned from the Plate Trophy does not qualify for inclusion in the Order of Merit.

== Main draw ==
=== Preliminary rounds ===
==== Round 1 ====
Best of 7 frames

(Belgium) Tomasz Skalski	4–0	(Germany) Bernd Friedrich
(Germany) Phil Barnes	4–1	(Austria) Dominik Scherübl
(Germany) Julian Treiber	0–4	(Germany) Fabian Grube
(New Zealand) Chris McBreen	4–0	(Netherlands) Serge Lievens
(Netherlands) Tonnie Kok	4–0	(Switzerland) Thomas Schneeberger
(Germany) Mirko Groß	4–0	(Germany) Oliver Kremp
(Belarus) Wladimir Ponomarenko	4–0	(Germany) Ralf Hemmerlingx
(Germany) Rolf Schmidt	1–4	(Netherlands) Lam Hui-wah
(Germany) Oliver Metzger	0–4	(Germany) Stefan Gerst
(Germany) Wilhelm Braunwald	4–0	(Germany) Nicole Breitenstein
(Germany) Marko Wölki	w/o–w/d	(China) Tian Pengfei
(Germany) Helmut Miss	0–4	(Netherlands) Xander van Rossum
(England) Lee Farebrother	w/d–w/o	(Germany) Thomas Cesal
(Netherlands) Willem Monfils	w/o–w/d	(Germany) Tom Egger
(Turkey) Soner Sari	4–2	(Germany) Markus Milde
(Germany) Wolfgang Brandmeier	4–1	(Germany) Stefan Schenk
(Germany) Dirk Fieron	0–4	(Germany) Uwe Seyler
(Germany) Michael Eheim	2–4	(Germany) Andreas Hartung
(Germany) Dieter Meier	4–0	(Germany) Hendrik Henschke
(Croatia) Stevo Vucicevic	w/d–w/o	(Netherlands) Roy Stolk
(Germany) Christof Biniarsch	4–2	(Netherlands) Jarl Hinfelaar
(Germany) Thomas Valentin	0–4	(England) Jamie Walker
(Germany) Lothar Kempgens	0–4	(Germany) Lasse Münstermann
(Germany) Robert Sax	4–0	(Germany) Hans-Jürgen Bins
(Germany) Sascha Breuer	4–0	(Germany) Martin Rösler
(Sri Lanka) Naresh Samarawickrama	4–0	(Germany) Ole Steiner
(Germany) Robert Haimerl	0–4	(Germany) Gerhard Engelschalk
(Germany) Christian Gnamm	w/d–w/o	(Germany) Robert Drahn
(England) Chris Norbury	w/o–w/d	(England) Andy Lee
(Romania) Druta Lorin Ionut	0–4	(Italy) Tiziano Guerra
(Germany) Michael Seidel	4–0	(Germany) Samir Önder

(Germany) Ronny Buchholz	1–4	(Germany) Jörg Petersen
(Germany) Roberto Abart	0–4	(England) Sam Harvey
(Germany) Deniz Anar	4–2	(Germany) Johannes Oswald
(Germany) Robert Feß	4–3	(Germany) Walther Christian
(England) James Silverwood	w/d-w/o	(Germany) Anja Vucicevic
(Wales) Alex Taubman	4–1	(England) Zen Beechey
(Germany) Werner Pilz	0–4	(Netherlands) Gerrit bij de Leij
(Germany) Andreas Pesch	4–0	(Germany) Elisabeth Bins
(Netherlands) Aram Raken	2–4	(Germany) Patrick Fuchs
(Germany) Ronny Pawlitza	w/d-w/o	(Germany) Christian Hauburg
(Germany) Kevin Lämmermann	2–4	(Germany) Jean Luca Nüßgen
(Germany) Michael Betzinger	4–0	(Romania) Andrei Cristian Vintu
(Germany) Julian Gärtner	1–4	(Germany) Jürgen Kesseler
(Germany) Michael Heeger	0–4	(Netherlands) Maurice Le Duc
(Germany) Markus Hertle	w/o-w/d	(England) Tony Knowles
(Netherlands) Mario Wehrmann	4–0	(Germany) Michael Bach
(Germany) Thomas Hoeltschl	3–4	(Germany) Jörg Schneidewindt
(Netherlands) Rene van Rijsberger	w/o-w/d	(Republic of Ireland) Austin Moles
(England) Oliver Brown	4–2	(Germany) Dirk Hochheim
(Turkey) Ali Kirim	4–0	(Germany) Rüdiger Nickel
(Germany) Diana Schuler	4–3	(Germany) Daniel Dieudonne
(Germany) Ronni Beniesch	4–2	(Germany) Bernd Strnad
(Germany) Kilian Baur-Pantoulier	3–4	(Germany) Norbert Hofheinz
(Germany) Falk Hollenwäger	3–4	(Croatia) Sanjin Kusan
(Germany) Hao Lac Hanh	4–3	(Germany) Klaus Wuscher
(Germany) Ralf Günzel	0–4	(Switzerland) Alexander Ursenbacher
(Belgium) Hans Blankaert	0–4	(Wales) Gareth Allen
(England) Christopher Henry	4–0	(Netherlands) Laurin Winters
(Germany) Miro Popovic	4–0	(Germany) Fabian Meulner
(Netherlands) Florian Moederscheim	4–1	(Netherlands) Coen Fool
(Germany) Thomas Lüthi	4–3	(Germany) Gerhard Mader

==== Round 2 ====
Best of 7 frames

(Belgium) Tomasz Skalski	4–1	(Germany) Phil Barnes
(Germany) Fabian Grube	1–4	(New Zealand) Chris McBreen
(Netherlands) Tonnie Kok	4–0	(Germany) Mirko Groß
(Belarus) Wladimir Ponomarenko	4–1	(Netherlands) Lam Hui-wah
(Germany) Stefan Gerst	4–0	(Germany) Wilhelm Braunwald
(Germany) Marko Wölki	0–4	(Netherlands) Xander van Rossum
(Germany) Thomas Cesal	3–4	(Netherlands) Willem Monfils
(Turkey) Soner Sari	4–1	(Germany) Wolfgang Brandmeier
(Germany) Gerald Götz	3–4	(Germany) Uwe Seyler
(Germany) Andreas Hartung	1–4	(Germany) Dieter Meier
(Netherlands) Roy Stolk	4–1	(Germany) Christof Biniarsch
(England) Jamie Walker	0–4	(Germany) Lasse Münstermann
(Germany) Robert Sax	4–2	(Germany) Sascha Breuer
(Sri Lanka) Naresh Samarawickrama	4–0	(Germany) Gerhard Engelschalk
(Germany) Robert Drahn	0–4	(England) Chris Norbury
(Italy) Tiziano Guerra	1–4	(Germany) Michael Seidel

(Germany) Jörg Petersen	3–4	(England) Sam Harvey
(Germany) Deniz Anar	4–3	(Germany) Robert Feß
(Germany) Anja Vucicevic	0–4	(Wales) Alex Taubman
(Netherlands) Gerrit bij de Leij	4–0	(Germany) Andreas Pesch
(Germany) Patrick Fuchs	4–1	(Germany) Christian Hauburg
(Germany) Jean Luca Nüßgen	0–4	(Germany) Michael Betzinger
(Germany) Jürgen Kesseler	1–4	(Netherlands) Maurice Le Duc
(Germany) Markus Hertle	2–4	(Netherlands) Mario Wehrmann
(Germany) Jörg Schneidewindt	1–4	(Netherlands) Rene van Rijsberger
(England) Oliver Brown	4–0	(Turkey) Ali Kirim
(Germany) Diana Schuler	4–0	(Germany) Ronni Beniesch
(Netherlands) Rogier van der Kamp	4–0	(Germany) Norbert Hofheinz
(Croatia) Sanjin Kusan	4–0	(Germany) Hao Lac Hanh
(Switzerland) Alexander Ursenbacher	0–4	(Wales) Gareth Allen
(England) Christopher Henry	4–1	(Germany) Miro Popovic
(Netherlands) Florian Moederscheim	4–0	(Germany) Thomas Lüthi

=== Main rounds ===
==== Top half ====
===== Section 1 =====
Last 128; Best of 7 frames
(England) Mark Selby	4
(Belgium) Tomasz Skalski	1
(England) Matthew Couch	2
(England) Ali Carter	4
(Republic of Ireland) Fergal O'Brien	4
(New Zealand) Chris McBreen	0
(Scotland) Graeme Dott	2
(England) Steve Davis	4
(Wales) Matthew Stevens	4
(Netherlands) Tonnie Kok	0
(England) Mark Davis	4
(Belarus) Wladimir Ponomarenko	0
(Wales) Jamie Jones	4
(Wales) Jak Jones	1
(England) Paul Davison	3
(England) David Grace	4

Last 64; Best of 7 frames
(England) Mark Selby	3
(England) Ali Carter	4
(Republic of Ireland) Fergal O'Brien	1
(England) Steve Davis	4
(Wales) Matthew Stevens	1
(England) Mark Davis	4
(Wales) Jamie Jones	4
(England) David Grace	1

Last 32; Best of 7 frames
(England) Ali Carter	1
(England) Steve Davis	4
(England) Mark Davis	4
(Wales) Jamie Jones	2

Last 16; Best of 7 frames
(England) Steve Davis	4
(England) Mark Davis	3

===== Section 2 =====
Last 128; Best of 7 frames
(England) Mark Joyce	1
(Northern Ireland) Patrick Wallace	4
(Wales) Michael White	4
(Germany) Stefan Gerst	0
(England) Andrew Higginson	4
(Northern Ireland) Mark Allen	2
(England) Stephen Lee	4
(Netherlands) Xander van Rossum	0
(England) Barry Hawkins	4
(Netherlands) Willem Monfils	1
(England) Mark King	3
(England) Shaun Murphy	4
(Wales) Dominic Dale	4
(Turkey) Soner Sari	0
(England) Joe Perry	4
(England) Jamie O'Neill	2

Last 64; Best of 7 frames
(Northern Ireland) Patrick Wallace	1
(Wales) Michael White	4
(England) Andrew Higginson	4
(England) Stephen Lee	3
(England) Barry Hawkins	0
(England) Shaun Murphy	4
(Wales) Dominic Dale	0
(England) Joe Perry	4

Last 32; Best of 7 frames
(Wales) Michael White	0
(England) Andrew Higginson	4
(England) Shaun Murphy	4
(England) Joe Perry	1

Last 16; Best of 7 frames
(England) Andrew Higginson	2
(England) Shaun Murphy	4

===== Section 3 =====
Last 128; Best of 7 frames
(England) Jack Lisowski	4
(England) Robbie Williams	1
(England) Adrian Gunnell	4
(Germany) Uwe Seyler	0
(England) Nick Jennings	3
(England) Andrew Norman	4
(Hong Kong) Marco Fu	4
(China) Zhang Anda	3
(England) Ricky Walden	4
(Germany) Dieter Meier	1
(England) Kuldesh Johal	0
(England) Michael Wild	4
(China) Liang Wenbo	0
(England) Rod Lawler	4
(England) Adam Wicheard	3
(England) Martin O'Donnell	4

Last 64; Best of 7 frames
(England) Jack Lisowski	4
(England) Adrian Gunnell	1
(England) Andrew Norman	2
(Hong Kong) Marco Fu	4
(England) Ricky Walden	4
(England) Michael Wild	1
(England) Rod Lawler	4
(England) Martin O'Donnell	1

Last 32; Best of 7 frames
(England) Jack Lisowski	4
(Hong Kong) Marco Fu	3
(England) Ricky Walden	4
(England) Rod Lawler	1

Last 16; Best of 7 frames
(England) Jack Lisowski	4
(England) Ricky Walden	0

===== Section 4 =====
Last 128; Best of 7 frames
(England) Judd Trump	4
(Republic of Ireland) Michael Judge	0
(England) Peter Ebdon	w/o
(England) Jake Nicholson	w/d
(England) Ben Woollaston	1
(China) Chen Zhe	4
(Wales) Andrew Pagett	4
(Wales) Paul Davies	3
(England) Liam Highfield	4
(Netherlands) Roy Stolk	3
(Scotland) Anthony McGill	4
(Germany) Lasse Münstermann	1
(England) Barry Pinches	3
(England) Robert Milkins	4
(Norway) Kurt Maflin	0
(England) Kyren Wilson	4

Last 64; Best of 7 frames
(England) Judd Trump	4
(England) Peter Ebdon	2
(China) Chen Zhe	1
(Wales) Andrew Pagett	4
(England) Liam Highfield	1
(Scotland) Anthony McGill	4
(England) Robert Milkins	3
(England) Kyren Wilson	4

Last 32; Best of 7 frames
(England) Judd Trump	4
(Wales) Andrew Pagett	0
(Scotland) Anthony McGill	4
(England) Kyren Wilson	1

Last 16; Best of 7 frames
(England) Judd Trump	4
(Scotland) Anthony McGill	2

==== Bottom half ====
===== Section 5 =====
Last 128; Best of 7 frames
(Wales) Mark Williams	4
(Germany) Robert Sax	0
(England) Matthew Selt	1
(Republic of Ireland) David Morris	4
(England) Peter Lines	4
(Sri Lanka) Naresh Samarawickrama	0
(England) Jimmy Michie	2
(England) Chris Norbury	4
(England) Jimmy White	4
(Germany) Michael Seidel	0
(England) Dave Harold	4
(England) Reanne Evans	1
(England) Ian McCulloch	2
(England) Craig Steadman	4
(England) Jamie Cope	4
(England) Ian Glover	3

Last 64; Best of 7 frames
(Wales) Mark Williams	2
(Republic of Ireland) David Morris	4
(England) Peter Lines	4
(England) Chris Norbury	1
(England) Jimmy White	4
(England) Dave Harold	2
(England) Craig Steadman	4
(England) Jamie Cope	3

Last 32; Best of 7 frames
(Republic of Ireland) David Morris	3
(England) Peter Lines	4
(England) Jimmy White	4
(England) Craig Steadman	2

Last 16; Best of 7 frames
(England) Peter Lines	0
(England) Jimmy White	4

===== Section 6 =====
Last 128; Best of 7 frames
(Scotland) James McBain	2
(Belgium) Luca Brecel	4
(England) Mike Dunn	4
(England) Sam Harvey	0
(Wales) Daniel Wells	4
(England) Justin Astley	3
(Brazil) Igor Figueiredo	4
(Germany) Deniz Anar	0
(England) Jimmy Robertson	4
(Wales) Alex Taubman	0
(England) Ronnie O'Sullivan	w/o
(China) Yu Delu	w/d
(England) Michael Wasley	4
(Netherlands) Gerrit bij de Leij	1
(England) Alfie Burden	4
(Germany) Patrick Fuchs	0

Last 64; Best of 7 frames
(Belgium) Luca Brecel	2
(England) Mike Dunn	4
(Wales) Daniel Wells	4
(Brazil) Igor Figueiredo	3
(England) Jimmy Robertson	w/o
(England) Ronnie O'Sullivan	w/d
(England) Michael Wasley	2
(England) Alfie Burden	4

Last 32; Best of 7 frames
(England) Mike Dunn	2
(Wales) Daniel Wells	4
(England) Jimmy Robertson	1
(England) Alfie Burden	4

Last 16; Best of 7 frames
(Wales) Daniel Wells	4
(England) Alfie Burden	2

===== Section 7 =====
Last 128; Best of 7 frames
(Wales) Ryan Day	3
(Northern Ireland) Joe Swail	4
(Scotland) Alan McManus	4
(Germany) Michael Betzinger	0
(England) Allan Taylor	4
(Netherlands) Maurice Le Duc	3
(Northern Ireland) Gerard Greene	4
(Netherlands) Mario Wehrmann	1
(England) Andy Hicks	0
(Australia) Neil Robertson	4
(England) Martin Gould	4
(Netherlands) Rene van Rijsberger	3
(England) Joe Jogia	0
(China) Liu Song	4
(England) Stuart Bingham	4
(England) Oliver Brown	1

Last 64; Best of 7 frames
(Northern Ireland) Joe Swail	4
(Scotland) Alan McManus	1
(England) Allan Taylor	3
(Northern Ireland) Gerard Greene	4
(Australia) Neil Robertson	4
(England) Martin Gould	1
(China) Liu Song	3
(England) Stuart Bingham	4

Last 32; Best of 7 frames
(Northern Ireland) Joe Swail	1
(Northern Ireland) Gerard Greene	4
(Australia) Neil Robertson	0
(England) Stuart Bingham	4

Last 16; Best of 7 frames
(Northern Ireland) Gerard Greene	1
(England) Stuart Bingham	4

===== Section 8 =====
Last 128; Best of 7 frames
(England) Anthony Hamilton	4
(Germany) Diana Schuler	0
(England) Mitchell Mann	4
(Netherlands) Rogier van der Kamp	1
(England) Nigel Bond	4
(Croatia) Sanjin Kusan	0
(Scotland) Marcus Campbell	4
(Wales) Gareth Allen	1
(China) Liu Chuang	0
(Scotland) Stephen Hendry	4
(Belgium) Bjorn Haneveer	4
(England) Christopher Henry	0
(Germany) Patrick Einsle	4
(Netherlands) Florian Moederscheim	1
(England) Tom Ford	3
(England) Michael Holt	4

Last 64; Best of 7 frames
(England) Anthony Hamilton	4
(England) Mitchell Mann	1
(England) Nigel Bond	1
(Scotland) Marcus Campbell	4
(Scotland) Stephen Hendry	2
(Belgium) Bjorn Haneveer	4
(Germany) Patrick Einsle	1
(England) Michael Holt	4

Last 32; Best of 7 frames
(England) Anthony Hamilton	4
(Scotland) Marcus Campbell	3
(Belgium) Bjorn Haneveer	4
(England) Michael Holt	3

Last 16; Best of 7 frames
(England) Anthony Hamilton	4
(Belgium) Bjorn Haneveer	2

==== Finals ====
Quarter-finals; Best of 7 frames		Semi-finals; Best of 7 frames		Final; Best of 7 frames
(England) Steve Davis	1
(England) Shaun Murphy	4	(England) Shaun Murphy	2
(England) Jack Lisowski	0	(England) Judd Trump	4
(England) Judd Trump	4			(England) Judd Trump	4
(England) Jimmy White	2			(England) Anthony Hamilton	3
(Wales) Daniel Wells	4	(Wales) Daniel Wells	1
(England) Stuart Bingham	3	(England) Anthony Hamilton	4
(England) Anthony Hamilton	4

== Final ==
Final: Best of 7 frames. Stadthalle, Fürth, Germany, 29 August 2010.
Judd Trump; England	4–3	Anthony Hamilton; England
98–0, 0–89, 27–68 (68), 42–72, 79–39 (69), 97–0 (97), 92–0 (52)
97	Highest break	68
0	Century breaks	0
3	50+ breaks	1

== Century breaks ==
- 143 – Barry Hawkins
- 136, 101 – Michael White
- 134 – Michael Wasley
- 133, 116 – Shaun Murphy
- 128 – Stuart Bingham
- 128 – Neil Robertson
- 127, 103 – Anthony McGill
- 122, 114, 101 – Jack Lisowski
- 120, 100 – Gerard Greene
- 117 – Mark Davis
- 117 – Jamie Cope
- 116, 104 – Jamie Jones
- 113, 104 – Jimmy White
- 113 – Bjorn Haneveer
- 113 – Mark Williams
- 112 – David Morris
- 111 – Mitchell Mann
- 111 – Kyren Wilson
- 110, 101 – Andrew Higginson
- 110 – Alfie Burden
- 109, 102 – Anthony Hamilton
- 109 – Christopher Henry
- 108, 105 – Ricky Walden
- 108 – Judd Trump
- 107 – Alan McManus
- 105 – Dave Harold
- 104 – Dominic Dale
- 100 – Patrick Einsle
