= European Tour 2013/2014 – Event 7 =

European Tour 2013/2014 Event 7

Tournament information
- Dates: 14–17 November 2013
- Venue: Lotto Arena
- City: Antwerp
- Country: Belgium
- Organisation: World Snooker
- Format: Minor-ranking event
- Total prize fund: €129,178
- Winner's share: €25,000
- Highest break: Judd Trump (ENG) (147)

Final
- Champion: Mark Selby (ENG)
- Runner-up: Ronnie O'Sullivan (ENG)
- Score: 4–3

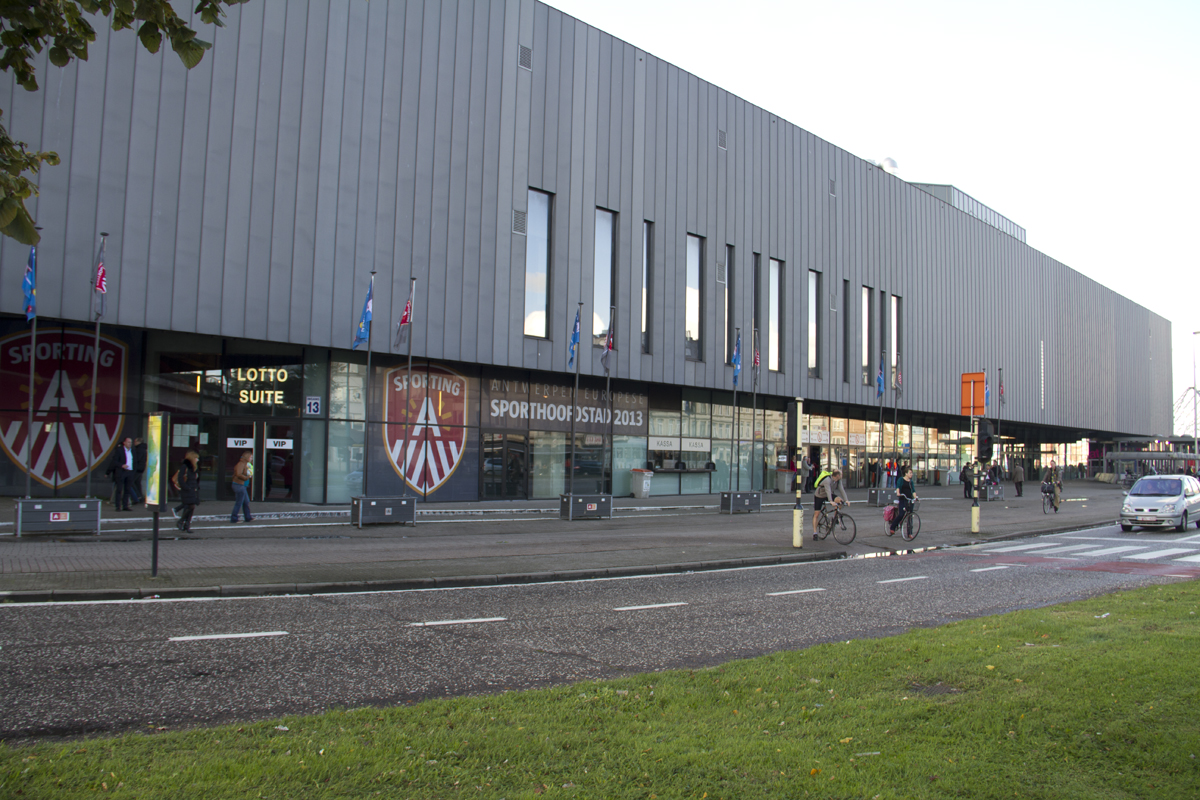
Outdoor view of the venue

The European Tour 2013/2014 – Event 7 (also known as the 2013 Antwerp Open) was a professional minor-ranking snooker tournament that took place between 14 and 17 November 2013 at the Lotto Arena in Antwerp, Belgium.

Judd Trump made the 99th official maximum break during his last 32 match against Mark Selby. This was Trump's first official 147 break and also the second maximum break in the 2013/2014 season.

Mark Allen was the defending champion, but he lost 1–4 against Joe Perry in the last 16.

Mark Selby won his 12th professional title by defeating Ronnie O'Sullivan 4–3 in the final.

== Prize fund and ranking points ==
The breakdown of prize money and ranking points of the event is shown below:

	Prize fund	Ranking points^{1}
Winner	€25,000	2,000
Runner-up	€12,000	1,600
Semi-finalist	€6,000	1,280
Quarter-finalist	€4,000	1,000
Last 16	€2,300	760
Last 32	€1,200	560
Last 64	€700	360
Maximum break	€4,178	–
Total	€129,178	–

- ^{1} Only professional players can earn ranking points.

== Main draw ==
=== Preliminary rounds ===
==== Round 1 ====
Best of 7 frames

(Belgium) Erwin Verheyden	1–4	(Netherlands) Ameer Baksh

==== Round 2 ====
Best of 7 frames

(England) Martin Power	2–4	(England) Adam Bobat
(England) Steven Hallworth	4–1	(Belgium) Phuntsok Jaegers
(Belgium) Tsie Waa Ip	w/o–w/d	(India) David Singh
(Belgium) Wim De Roeck	4–0	(Netherlands) Kim Fai Sung
(Germany) Diana Schuler	w/d–w/o	(Belgium) Davy Wittoeck
(Netherlands) Juriaan Van Den Nieuwenhuizen	0–4	(England) Adam Longley
(Poland) Kacper Filipiak	4–1	(Belgium) Bart Van Der Haegen
(England) Oliver Lines	4–0	(Belgium) Jan Goossens
(Belgium) Niki Baele	4–1	(Scotland) Ross Higgins
(Belgium) Steven Verelst	3–4	(England) Mitchell Travis
(Austria) Andreas Ploner	4–2	(England) Zack Richardson
(England) Matthew Glasby	4–0	(England) Gary Steele
(Belgium) Pierre Dethier	4–2	(Belgium) Pascal Decloedt
(Netherlands) Manon Melief	0–4	(Belgium) Jürgen Van Roy
(Belgium) Alain Van Der Steen	4–3	(Belgium) Jeff Jacobs
(Wales) Jamie Clarke	4–0	(Netherlands) Raymond Huisman
(Belgium) Tijs Van Puyenbroeck	2–4	(England) Thomas Wealthy
(England) Ryan Causton	4–1	(Germany) Daniel Schneider
(Belgium) Pascal Charot	0–4	(England) Darren Cook
(Belgium) Daan Van De Parre	0–4	(Wales) Gareth Allen
(England) Kevin Southern	0–4	(England) Ben Harrison
(Belgium) Kasra Khavaran	2–4	(England) Matthew Day
(Belgium) Mario Hautekeete	1–4	(England) Damian Wilks
(England) Sean Hopkin	4–1	(Belgium) Kevin Van Den Broeck
(England) Matthew Hudson	1–4	(Belgium) Frank Driesen
(Netherlands) Kevin Chan	4–1	(England) Dean Sheridan
(Wales) Duane Jones	4–1	(England) Christopher Keogan
(Belgium) Wan Chooi Tan	2–4	(Belgium) Johny Moermans
(England) Michael Wild	4–1	(Belgium) Jurgen Hauffman
(Netherlands) Peter Bertens	0–4	(Northern Ireland) Jamie McArdle
(England) Michael Georgiou	4–0	(Switzerland) Marc Weibel
(Belgium) Pieter Vanassche	0–4	(England) Ashley Hugill
(Belgium) Kris Van Landeghem	2–4	(Netherlands) Ton Berkhout
(England) Zak Surety	4–0	(Belgium) Kevin Vandevoort

(Belgium) Bruno Menegotto	w/o–w/d	(France) Jean-Baptiste Erceau
(Belgium) Pascal Durnez	1–4	(Poland) Adam Stefanow
(Belgium) Hans Blanckaert	1–4	(England) Ashley Carty
(England) Oliver Brown	4–0	(Belgium) Dominiek Vieuvalet
(Northern Ireland) Billy Brown	3–4	(England) Ian Glover
(Belgium) Paul Van Welssenaers	0–4	(England) Anthony Harris
(Wales) Alex Taubman	4–3	(England) Ricky Norris
(Belgium) Dirk Coppens	0–4	(Belgium) Peter Bullen
(England) Joe Steele	4–2	(Belgium) Tom de Wit
(Wales) Kishan Hirani	2–4	(England) Sanderson Lam
(France) Jerome Jamart	0–4	(Belgium) Steve Lambrechts
(England) Michael Williams	2–4	(England) James Silverwood
(Belgium) Fred Letecheur	4–1	(Belgium) Luc Blancke
(Belgium) Wendy Jans	4–0	(Belgium) Pascal Budo
(Sweden) Ron Florax	1–4	(England) Charlie Walters
(England) Martin Ball	4–2	(Belgium) Mario Van Herk
(Netherlands) Rene Dikstra	2–4	(Netherlands) Ameer Baksh
(Netherlands) Jurgen Goudailler	4–0	(Netherlands) Maurice Rijk
(England) Saqib Nasir	4–0	(Netherlands) Jeroen Van Driel
(Belgium) Serge Moeyersons	4–1	(Belgium) Steven Put
(Spain) Joaquin Marin	3–4	(Belgium) Peter Vertommen
(Poland) Patryk Maslowski	2–4	(Netherlands) Jerom Meeus
(England) Christopher Harrison	0–4	(England) Jeff Cundy
(Wales) Ben Jones	4–0	(Germany) Felix Frede
(England) Michael Tomlinson	4–2	(Belgium) Jurian Heusdens
(Belgium) Glenn Van Hulle	2–4	(Belgium) Kevin Van Hove
(Belgium) Pascal Raes	1–4	(Belgium) Rene Hemelsoet
(Netherlands) Frans Veling	4–0	Lee Young
(Portugal) Francisco Domingues	1–4	(Belgium) Kristof Vermeiren
(England) Craig Barber	4–1	(Belgium) Andy Van Landeghem
(Belgium) Tomasz Skalski	3–4	(Wales) Jack Bradford
(Scotland) Marc Davis	4–0	(Netherlands) Emile Bastiaan Hendriksen
(England) Phil O'Kane	4–0	(Netherlands) Jack Bruins
(Scotland) Michael Collumb	4–1	(Netherlands) Sebastiaan Kan

==== Round 3 ====
Best of 7 frames

(England) Adam Bobat	1–4	(England) Steven Hallworth
(Belgium) Tsie Waa Ip	2–4	(Belgium) Wim De Roeck
(Belgium) Davy Wittoeck	0–4	(England) Adam Longley
(Poland) Kacper Filipiak	1–4	(England) Oliver Lines
(Belgium) Niki Baele	0–4	(England) Mitchell Travis
(Austria) Andreas Ploner	3–4	(England) Matthew Glasby
(Belgium) Pierre Dethier	1–4	(Belgium) Jürgen Van Roy
(Belgium) Alain Van Der Steen	0–4	(Wales) Jamie Clarke
(England) Thomas Wealthy	2–4	(England) Ryan Causton
(England) Darren Cook	3–4	(Wales) Gareth Allen
(England) Ben Harrison	0–4	(England) Matthew Day
(England) Damian Wilks	3–4	(England) Sean Hopkin
(Belgium) Frank Driesen	3–4	(Netherlands) Kevin Chan
(Wales) Duane Jones	4–0	(Belgium) Johny Moermans
(England) Michael Wild	4–3	(Northern Ireland) Jamie McArdle
(England) Michael Georgiou	4–3	(England) Ashley Hugill
(Netherlands) Ton Berkhout	0–4	(England) Zak Surety

(Belgium) Bruno Menegotto	0–4	(Poland) Adam Stefanow
(England) Ashley Carty	4–2	(England) Oliver Brown
(England) Ian Glover	1–4	(England) Anthony Harris
(Wales) Alex Taubman	4–3	(Belgium) Peter Bullen
(England) Joe Steele	1–4	(England) Sanderson Lam
(Belgium) Steve Lambrechts	3–4	(England) James Silverwood
(Belgium) Fred Letecheur	0–4	(Belgium) Wendy Jans
(England) Charlie Walters	0–4	(England) Martin Ball
(Netherlands) Ameer Baksh	4–2	(Netherlands) Jurgen Goudailler
(England) Saqib Nasir	4–1	(Belgium) Serge Moeyersons
(Belgium) Peter Vertommen	4–2	(Netherlands) Jerom Meeus
(England) Jeff Cundy	4–1	(Wales) Ben Jones
(England) Michael Tomlinson	4–1	(Belgium) Kevin Van Hove
(Belgium) Rene Hemelsoet	4–2	(Netherlands) Frans Veling
(Belgium) Kristof Vermeiren	2–4	(England) Craig Barber
(Wales) Jack Bradford	3–4	(Scotland) Marc Davis
(England) Phil O'Kane	4–1	(Scotland) Michael Collumb

==== Round 4 ====
Best of 7 frames

(England) Steven Hallworth	4–0	(Belgium) Wim De Roeck
(England) Adam Longley	2–4	(England) Oliver Lines
(England) Mitchell Travis	4–3	(England) Matthew Glasby
(Belgium) Jürgen Van Roy	1–4	(Wales) Jamie Clarke
(England) Ryan Causton	4–1	(Wales) Gareth Allen
(England) Matthew Day	4–2	(England) Sean Hopkin
(Netherlands) Kevin Chan	0–4	(Wales) Duane Jones
(England) Michael Wild	4–0	(England) Michael Georgiou
(England) Zak Surety	4–1	(Poland) Adam Stefanow

(England) Ashley Carty	4–0	(England) Anthony Harris
(Wales) Alex Taubman	1–4	(England) Sanderson Lam
(England) James Silverwood	4–3	(Belgium) Wendy Jans
(England) Martin Ball	4–0	(Netherlands) Ameer Baksh
(England) Saqib Nasir	4–2	(Belgium) Peter Vertommen
(England) Jeff Cundy	4–0	(England) Michael Tomlinson
(Belgium) Rene Hemelsoet	2–4	(England) Craig Barber
(Scotland) Marc Davis	4–2	(England) Phil O'Kane

=== Main rounds ===
==== Top half ====
===== Section 1 =====
Last 128; Best of 7 frames
(Wales) Mark Williams	4
(England) Steven Hallworth	0
(Scotland) Anthony McGill	2
(England) Barry Pinches	4
(England) Tom Ford	2
(England) Paul Davison	4
(England) David Grace	4
(England) Oliver Lines	3
(Scotland) Alan McManus	4
(England) Mitchell Travis	0
(England) Alfie Burden	4
(Wales) Jamie Clarke	2
(England) Peter Lines	1
(England) Ryan Causton	4
(India) Aditya Mehta	4
(Scotland) Michael Leslie	3

Last 64; Best of 7 frames
(Wales) Mark Williams	4
(England) Barry Pinches	0
(England) Paul Davison	1
(England) David Grace	4
(Scotland) Alan McManus	2
(England) Alfie Burden	4
(England) Ryan Causton	1
(India) Aditya Mehta	4

Last 32; Best of 7 frames
(Wales) Mark Williams	4
(England) David Grace	0
(England) Alfie Burden	3
(India) Aditya Mehta	4

Last 16; Best of 7 frames
(Wales) Mark Williams	2
(India) Aditya Mehta	4

===== Section 2 =====
Last 128; Best of 7 frames
(England) Andrew Norman	2
(England) Jack Lisowski	4
(England) Martin O'Donnell	1
(Scotland) Fraser Patrick	4
(Republic of Ireland) Fergal O'Brien	4
(Australia) Vinnie Calabrese	2
(Republic of Ireland) David Morris	4
(Malta) Alex Borg	1
(England) Robbie Williams	4
(England) Matthew Day	0
(Wales) Ryan Day	4
(England) Sean O'Sullivan	1
(Scotland) Scott Donaldson	4
(England) Adam Duffy	2
(Wales) Dominic Dale	3
(Wales) Duane Jones	4

Last 64; Best of 7 frames
(England) Jack Lisowski	4
(Scotland) Fraser Patrick	3
(Republic of Ireland) Fergal O'Brien	4
(Republic of Ireland) David Morris	3
(England) Robbie Williams	3
(Wales) Ryan Day	4
(Scotland) Scott Donaldson	4
(Wales) Duane Jones	1

Last 32; Best of 7 frames
(England) Jack Lisowski	4
(Republic of Ireland) Fergal O'Brien	2
(Wales) Ryan Day	4
(Scotland) Scott Donaldson	2

Last 16; Best of 7 frames
(England) Jack Lisowski	4
(Wales) Ryan Day	3

===== Section 3 =====
Last 128; Best of 7 frames
(Malta) Tony Drago	4
(England) Michael Wild	2
(England) Martin Gould	3
(China) Tian Pengfei	4
(England) Ian Burns	4
(Thailand) Noppon Saengkham	1
(England) Mike Dunn	0
(Wales) Andrew Pagett	4
(Northern Ireland) Joe Swail	2
(Thailand) Thepchaiya Un-Nooh	4
(England) Judd Trump	4
(China) Cao Xinlong	1
(England) Mark Selby	4
(Finland) Robin Hull	0
(England) Anthony Hamilton	1
(England) Zak Surety	4

Last 64; Best of 7 frames
(Malta) Tony Drago	4
(China) Tian Pengfei	1
(England) Ian Burns	3
(Wales) Andrew Pagett	4
(Thailand) Thepchaiya Un-Nooh	3
(England) Judd Trump	4
(England) Mark Selby	4
(England) Zak Surety	2

Last 32; Best of 7 frames
(Malta) Tony Drago	4
(Wales) Andrew Pagett	1
(England) Judd Trump	3
(England) Mark Selby	4

Last 16; Best of 7 frames
(Malta) Tony Drago	1
(England) Mark Selby	4

===== Section 4 =====
Last 128; Best of 7 frames
(England) Mark Joyce	4
(Thailand) Dechawat Poomjaeng	1
(China) Ding Junhui	4
(England) Ashley Carty	1
(England) Ali Carter	4
(England) Elliot Slessor	0
(Belgium) Luca Brecel	w/o
(China) Li Yan	w/d
(England) Rod Lawler	4
(England) Jimmy White	3
(Hong Kong) Marco Fu	4
(Switzerland) Alexander Ursenbacher	1
(England) Ricky Walden	4
(Germany) Patrick Einsle	0
(Wales) Jamie Jones	4
(England) Sanderson Lam	1

Last 64; Best of 7 frames
(England) Mark Joyce	2
(China) Ding Junhui	4
(England) Ali Carter	4
(Belgium) Luca Brecel	2
(England) Rod Lawler	3
(Hong Kong) Marco Fu	4
(England) Ricky Walden	4
(Wales) Jamie Jones	1

Last 32; Best of 7 frames
(China) Ding Junhui	4
(England) Ali Carter	2
(Hong Kong) Marco Fu	4
(England) Ricky Walden	1

Last 16; Best of 7 frames
(China) Ding Junhui	4
(Hong Kong) Marco Fu	2

==== Bottom half ====
===== Section 5 =====
Last 128; Best of 7 frames
(Scotland) John Higgins	4
(China) Chen Zhe	0
(England) Sam Baird	4
(England) James Cahill	1
(England) Matthew Selt	0
(England) Rory McLeod	4
(India) Pankaj Advani	4
(England) James Silverwood	0
(Wales) Matthew Stevens	4
(England) Martin Ball	1
(England) David Gilbert	4
(England) Saqib Nasir	0
(England) Michael Holt	4
(England) Ryan Clark	2
(England) Ben Woollaston	4
(England) Jamie O'Neill	2

Last 64; Best of 7 frames
(Scotland) John Higgins	1
(England) Sam Baird	4
(England) Rory McLeod	4
(India) Pankaj Advani	2
(Wales) Matthew Stevens	4
(England) David Gilbert	2
(England) Michael Holt	0
(England) Ben Woollaston	4

Last 32; Best of 7 frames
(England) Sam Baird	4
(England) Rory McLeod	2
(Wales) Matthew Stevens	1
(England) Ben Woollaston	4

Last 16; Best of 7 frames
(England) Sam Baird	1
(England) Ben Woollaston	4

===== Section 6 =====
Last 128; Best of 7 frames
(England) Stuart Carrington	1
(England) Andrew Higginson	4
(England) Mark King	4
(England) Lee Page	2
(England) Joel Walker	4
(England) Alex Davies	2
(England) Chris Wakelin	3
(England) Jamie Cope	4
(England) Kyren Wilson	4
(England) Jeff Cundy	3
(Norway) Kurt Maflin	4
(China) Li Hang	3
(England) Mark Davis	3
(Thailand) Thanawat Thirapongpaiboon	4
(England) Nigel Bond	4
(Thailand) Ratchayothin Yotharuck	0

Last 64; Best of 7 frames
(England) Andrew Higginson	3
(England) Mark King	4
(England) Joel Walker	4
(England) Jamie Cope	0
(England) Kyren Wilson	0
(Norway) Kurt Maflin	4
(Thailand) Thanawat Thirapongpaiboon	4
(England) Nigel Bond	3

Last 32; Best of 7 frames
(England) Mark King	0
(England) Joel Walker	4
(Norway) Kurt Maflin	4
(Thailand) Thanawat Thirapongpaiboon	1

Last 16; Best of 7 frames
(England) Joel Walker	4
(Norway) Kurt Maflin	1

===== Section 7 =====
Last 128; Best of 7 frames
(England) Robert Milkins	2
(England) Joe Perry	4
(England) Hammad Miah	2
(England) Craig Barber	4
(Northern Ireland) Gerard Greene	0
(England) Liam Highfield	4
(England) Gary Wilson	4
(China) Liang Wenbo	3
(England) John Astley	4
(England) Craig Steadman	3
(Scotland) Marcus Campbell	1
(China) Yu Delu	4
(England) Shaun Murphy	4
(Scotland) Marc Davis	1
(Northern Ireland) Mark Allen	4
(England) Allan Taylor	0

Last 64; Best of 7 frames
(England) Joe Perry	4
(England) Craig Barber	0
(England) Liam Highfield	4
(England) Gary Wilson	2
(England) John Astley	2
(China) Yu Delu	4
(England) Shaun Murphy	2
(Northern Ireland) Mark Allen	4

Last 32; Best of 7 frames
(England) Joe Perry	4
(England) Liam Highfield	3
(China) Yu Delu	1
(Northern Ireland) Mark Allen	4

Last 16; Best of 7 frames
(England) Joe Perry	4
(Northern Ireland) Mark Allen	1

===== Section 8 =====
Last 128; Best of 7 frames
(Wales) Daniel Wells	1
(Scotland) Graeme Dott	4
(England) Barry Hawkins	4
(England) Chris Norbury	1
(England) Stuart Bingham	4
(England) Dave Harold	1
(Republic of Ireland) Ken Doherty	w/d
(Thailand) James Wattana	w/o
(England) Michael Wasley	4
(China) Zhang Anda	3
(Wales) Michael White	w/o
(Qatar) Ahmed Saif	w/d
(Scotland) Stephen Maguire	w/d
(Scotland) Ross Muir	w/o
(England) Ronnie O'Sullivan	4
(Wales) Jak Jones	2

Last 64; Best of 7 frames
(Scotland) Graeme Dott	4
(England) Barry Hawkins	1
(England) Stuart Bingham	4
(Thailand) James Wattana	0
(England) Michael Wasley	1
(Wales) Michael White	4
(Scotland) Ross Muir	1
(England) Ronnie O'Sullivan	4

Last 32; Best of 7 frames
(Scotland) Graeme Dott	3
(England) Stuart Bingham	4
(Wales) Michael White	0
(England) Ronnie O'Sullivan	4

Last 16; Best of 7 frames
(England) Stuart Bingham	3
(England) Ronnie O'Sullivan	4

==== Finals ====
Quarter-finals; Best of 7 frames		Semi-finals; Best of 7 frames		Final; Best of 7 frames
(India) Aditya Mehta	0
(England) Jack Lisowski	4	(England) Jack Lisowski	2
(England) Mark Selby	4	(England) Mark Selby	4
(China) Ding Junhui	1			(England) Mark Selby	4
(England) Ben Woollaston	4			(England) Ronnie O'Sullivan	3
(England) Joel Walker	3	(England) Ben Woollaston	2
(England) Joe Perry	0	(England) Ronnie O'Sullivan	4
(England) Ronnie O'Sullivan	4

== Century breaks ==
- 147, 111, 109, 108, 104 – Judd Trump
- 142, 130, 123, 108, 107, 100 – Ronnie O'Sullivan
- 138, 116 – Kurt Maflin
- 136, 110, 103 – Mark Allen
- 135 – Ben Woollaston
- 134, 133 – Marco Fu
- 134, 131, 121 – Thepchaiya Un-Nooh
- 133 – Adam Duffy
- 129 – Nigel Bond
- 127 – Ryan Day
- 126, 122, 107, 103 – Mark Selby
- 126 – Pankaj Advani
- 125, 108 – Andrew Higginson
- 125 – Sean O'Sullivan
- 120 – Ian Burns
- 118, 115 – Ricky Walden
- 118, 103, 103 – Ding Junhui
- 111 – Joe Perry
- 108 – David Gilbert
- 106 – Liam Highfield
- 106 – Graeme Dott
- 105 – Mark Williams
- 100 – Sanderson Lam
- 100 – Fergal O'Brien
- 100 – Tony Drago
