= Stolk (surname) =

Stolk or Van Stolk is a Dutch toponymic surname. Stolk is a contracted form of Stolwijk, a town in South Holland.

Notable people with the surname include:

- Carlos Eduardo Stolk (1912–1995), Venezuelan lawyer, diplomat and business magnate; son of Teunis Stolk
- Jan van Stolk (1920–1997), Dutch ceramist
- Jimmy Leonard Stolk (born 1942), Surinamese soldier, entrepreneur, and murder suspect
- Kyle Stolk (born 1996), South-Africa-born Dutch swimmer
- Rob Stolk (1946–2001), Dutch political activist and printer
- Roy Stolk (born 1979), Dutch snooker player
- Vanderson Stolk Francisco (born 1987), Brazilian football defender
- Wim Stolk (1950–2011), Dutch phantasy writer who used the pseudonym W.J. Maryson

== See also ==
- Atlas Van Stolk, collection of Dutch history-related engravings and maps founded by Abraham van Stolk (1814–1896)
- Stolk, small community in Northern Germany
