= 2004 EBSA European Snooker Championship =

EBSA European Snooker Championships
Tournament information
- Dates: 26 May – 5 June 2004
- City: Völkermarkt
- Country: Austria
- Organisation: EBSA
- Total prize fund: €5,200
- Winner's share: €1,000
- Highest break: (Republic of Ireland) David Morris (139)

Final
- Champion: (Northern Ireland) Mark Allen
- Runner-up: (Malta) Alex Borg
- Score: 7–6

The 2004 EBSA European Snooker Championships was an amateur snooker tournament that took place from 26 May to 5 June 2004 in Völkermarkt, Austria It was the 13th edition of the EBSA European Snooker Championships and also doubles as a qualification event for the World Snooker Tour.

The tournament was won by 14th seed Mark Allen who defeated 13th seed Alex Borg 7–6 in the final. Almost four years later Allen cemented his reputation as one of the most promising upcoming snooker talents in the world at the time by reaching the top 16 on the World Snooker Tour for the first time in his career. Alex Borg would himself go on to win the EBSA European Snooker Championship the following year and secure World Snooker Tour for the 2005/2006 season. Borg would also retain the tournament in 2006.

== Results ==
Round 1 Best of 7 frames
1	(England) James Tatton	2
32	(Northern Ireland) Colin Bingham	4
16	(Belgium) Jim Spapen	4
17	(Republic of Ireland) Robert Murphy	2
9	(Northern Ireland) Dermot McGlinchey	4
24	(Belgium) Yvan Van Velthoven	1
25	(Republic of Ireland) David Morris	3
8	(France) Yannick Poulain	4
5	(Germany) Lasse Münstermann	3
28	(Denmark) Rune Kampe	4
21	(Belgium) Serge Das	3
12	(Scotland) Michael Philbin	4
13	(Malta) Alex Borg	4
20	(Malta) Duncan Bezzina	1
29	(Wales) Marcel Price	3
4	(Netherlands) Roy Stolk	4
3	(Wales) David John	4
30	(Poland) Jaroslaw Kowalski	1
19	(Iceland) Brynjar Valdimarsson	3
14	(Northern Ireland) Mark Allen	4
11	(Netherlands) Gerrit Bij De Leij	4
22	(Republic of Ireland) Tom Gleeson	2
27	(Malta) Simon Zammit	2
6	(Republic of Ireland) Rodney Goggins	4
7	(Netherlands) Stefan Mazrocis	4
26	(Hungary) Ede Dunai	1
23	(Wales) Darren Thompson	4
10	(Scotland) Ian Wilkie	1
15	(Northern Ireland) Joe Meara	1
18	(Wales) Jamie Jones	4
31	(England) Ian Gelhardt	2
2	(England) Eddie Cooper	4

Round 2 Best of 9 frames
32	(Northern Ireland) Colin Bingham	5
16	(Belgium) Jim Spapen	2
9	(Northern Ireland) Dermot McGlinchey	5
8	(France) Yannick Poulain	2
28	(Denmark) Rune Kampe	5
12	(Scotland) Michael Philbin	4
13	(Malta) Alex Borg	5
4	(Netherlands) Roy Stolk	2
3	(Wales) David John	3
14	(Northern Ireland) Mark Allen	5
11	(Netherlands) Gerrit Bij De Leij	5
6	(Republic of Ireland) Rodney Goggins	3
7	(Netherlands) Stefan Mazrocis	5
23	(Wales) Darren Thompson	1
18	(Wales) Jamie Jones	4
2	(England) Eddie Cooper	5

Quarter-Finals; Best of 9 frames
32	(Northern Ireland) Colin Bingham	2
9	(Northern Ireland) Dermot McGlinchey	5
28	(Denmark) Rune Kampe	3
13	(Malta) Alex Borg	5
14	(England) Mark Allen	5
11	(Netherlands) Gerrit Bij De Leij	3
7	(Netherlands) Stefan Mazrocis	5
2	(England) Eddie Cooper	4

Semi-Finals; Best of 11 frames
9	(Northern Ireland) Dermot McGlinchey	4
13	(Malta) Alex Borg	6
14	(Northern Ireland) Mark Allen	6
7	(Netherlands) Stefan Mazrocis	3

Final; Best of 13 frames
13	(Malta) Alex Borg	6
14	(Northern Ireland) Mark Allen	7
