= Players Tour Championship 2011/2012 – Event 9 =

Players Tour Championship 2011/2012 Event 9

Tournament information
- Dates: 10–13 November 2011
- Venue: Lotto Arena
- City: Antwerp
- Country: Belgium
- Organisation: World Snooker
- Format: Minor-ranking event
- Total prize fund: €50,000
- Winner's share: €10,000
- Highest break: Nigel Bond (ENG) (137)

Final
- Champion: Judd Trump (ENG)
- Runner-up: Ronnie O'Sullivan (ENG)
- Score: 4–3

The Players Tour Championship 2011/2012 – Event 9 (also known as the 2011 Acuerate Antwerp Open for sponsorship purposes) was a professional minor-ranking snooker tournament that took place between 10 and 13 November 2011 at the Lotto Arena in Antwerp, Belgium.

Judd Trump won the sixth professional title of his career by defeating Ronnie O'Sullivan 4–3 in the final.

The tournament was the last of Bjorn Haneveer's career; having already announced his intention to retire, he lost 2–4 to Jimmy White in the first round.

== Prize fund and ranking points ==
The breakdown of prize money and ranking points of the event is shown below:

	Prize fund	Ranking points^{1}
Winner	€10,000	2,000
Runner-up	€5,000	1,600
Semi-finalist	€2,500	1,280
Quarter-finalist	€1,500	1,000
Last 16	€1,000	760
Last 32	€600	560
Last 64	€200	360
Total	€50,000	–

- ^{1} Only professional players can earn ranking points.

== Main draw ==
=== Preliminary rounds ===
==== Round 1 ====
Best of 7 frames

(Belgium) Kristof De Bruyn	4–0	(Belgium) Cliff Castelein
(Belgium) Xavier Pemmerl	2–4	(Belgium) Patrick Geysels
(Netherlands) Peter Bertens	3–4	(Belgium) Chris Maesschalck
(Belgium) Daan Van De Parre	2–4	(Netherlands) Nick Tielemans
(Belgium) Julian Heusdens	w/o–w/d	(Belgium) Isabella Jonckheere
(Belgium) Geert Herrewyn	0–4	(Belgium) Alain Van Der Steen
(Belgium) Ward Van Doren	1–4	(Netherlands) Joris Maas
(Netherlands) Roy Stolk	4–1	(Belgium) Danny Lathouwers
(Belgium) Luc Heirewegh	w/o–w/d	(Belgium) Tarzan Nassim Faouz
(Belgium) Erwin Verheyden	0–4	(Netherlands) Maurice Le Duc
(Belgium) Stein de Sterck	2–4	(Belgium) Wim Andries
(Belgium) Jan Goossens	4–0	(Belgium) Martin Spoormans
(Belgium) Peter Cnudde	0–4	(Belgium) Thomas Broeckx
(Belgium) Sam de Cooman	4–0	(France) Nicolas Schianchi

(Netherlands) Misja van Vonderen	4–1	(Belgium) Mark Buteneers
(Belgium) Eduard Raes	1–4	(Belgium) Tom de Wit
(England) Mark Vincent	4–1	(Belgium) Tino De Witte
(Belgium) Jeff Jacobs	0–4	(Belgium) Jürgen Vandenbossche
(Belgium) Tom Vanwelsenaers	4–2	(Belgium) Wim De Roeck
(Netherlands) Maurice Rijk	0–4	(Belgium) Ahmed Osman
(Belgium) Daan Leysen	2–4	(Belgium) Kevin Van Hove
(Belgium) Serge Moeyersons	0–4	(Belgium) Bart De Mooter
(France) Philippe Broto	0–4	(Belgium) Rudy Poelmans
(Belgium) Eddy Kindermans	w/d–w/o	(Belgium) Pascal Raes
(Belgium) Raf Vervoort	4–0	(Belgium) Kenneth Jaques
(Belgium) David Fransis	0–4	(Belgium) Peter Bullen
(Belgium) Jan Mortele	2–4	(Belgium) Claudio Mercurio
(France) Alexis Callewaert	2–4	(Belgium) Wilfried Ide

==== Round 2 ====
Best of 7 frames

(China) Zhang Anda	4–0	(Belgium) Pierre Dethier
(England) Reanne Evans	4–1	(Belgium) Kris Van Landeghem
(China) Chen Zhe	4–0	(Belgium) Kristof De Bruyn
(Belgium) Bart Noeth	1–4	(Belgium) Patrick Geysels
(Republic of Ireland) Joe Delaney	4–0	(Belgium) Chris Maesschalck
(England) Phil O'Kane	w/o–w/d	(Iran) Mohammad Lababi
(England) Ricky Norris	0–4	(France) Yannick Poulain
(England) Stephen Craigie	4–0	(Netherlands) Juriaan Van Den Nieuwenhuizen
(Wales) Alex Taubman	4–1	(Netherlands) Nick Tielemans
(England) Lee Farebrother	w/d–w/o	(Belgium) Julian Heusdens
(England) Justin Astley	4–1	(Belgium) Alain Van Der Steen
(England) Shane Castle	4–1	(Netherlands) Joris Maas
(Belgium) Erwin Goethals	2–4	(Belgium) Nicky Godeyne
(England) Oliver Brown	2–4	(Netherlands) Mario Wehrmann
(England) Alex Davies	1–4	(Netherlands) Roy Stolk
(Wales) Gareth Allen	4–0	(Belgium) Wan Chooi Tang
(England) Lee Page	4–1	(Belgium) Jos Voets
(England) Mike Hallett	w/d–w/o	(Belgium) Luc Heirewegh
(Scotland) Eden Sharav	w/d–w/o	(Belgium) Mathijs Bokken
(England) Matthew Day	w/o–w/d	(Iran) Saeed Abolesani
(England) Christopher Henry	4–3	(Netherlands) Maurice Le Duc
(England) Kyren Wilson	4–1	(Belgium) Wim Andries
(Belgium) Dirk Coppens	4–2	(Belgium) Jan Goossens
(Belgium) Johan Somers	2–4	(Belgium) Thomas Broeckx
(England) Ian Burns	4–1	(Belgium) Yvan Van Velthoven
(Netherlands) Laurin Winters	0–4	(Belgium) Kevin Jacobs
(Belgium) Tim Van Gouberghen	4–0	(Belgium) Sam de Cooman
(Wales) Andrew Rogers	4–0	(Belgium) Nicolas Lambrechts
(England) Michael Wasley	4–0	(Netherlands) Misja van Vonderen
(England) Robbie Williams	4–0	(Belgium) Tobias De Bock
(England) Martin Ball	4–0	(Belgium) Thierry Dervoigne
(England) Sean O'Sullivan	4–1	(Belgium) Koen Walraet

(England) Mitchell Mann	w/d–w/o	(France) Stéphane Ochoïski
(England) Martin O'Donnell	4–1	(Belgium) Tom de Wit
(Belgium) Bart Van Der Haegen	0–4	(England) Mark Vincent
(Belgium) Raphael Profeta	3–4	(Belgium) Tom Vervoort
(England) Mitchell Travis	w/d–w/o	(Belgium) Jürgen Vandenbossche
(England) Nick Jennings	4–0	(Belgium) Wendy Jans
(England) Ben Harrison	4–0	(Netherlands) Brian Beekers
(England) Ryan Causton	4–0	(Belgium) Tom Vanwelsenaers
(India) David Singh	1–4	(Belgium) Ahmed Osman
(Scotland) Jonathan Fulcher	4–0	(Belgium) Kevin Daenekindt
(Netherlands) Jerom Meeus	2–4	(Belgium) Yannick Sablon
(England) Billy Joe Castle	w/d–w/o	(Netherlands) Maarten Niessen
(England) Ashley Wright	4–0	(Belgium) Kevin Van Den Broeck
(Belgium) Hans Blanckaert	1–4	(Belgium) Kevin Van Hove
(England) Allan Taylor	4–1	(Belgium) Franky Debaene
(Wales) Jak Jones	w/d–w/o	(England) Greg Davis
(England) Jamie O'Neill	4–0	(Belgium) Bart De Mooter
(England) Chris Norbury	4–1	(Belgium) Mario Van Herk
(England) Jamie Walker	w/d–w/o	(Belgium) Davy Wittoeck
(Belgium) Rene Hemelsoet	4–2	(Belgium) Rudy Poelmans
(England) Gary Wilson	4–0	(Belgium) Pascal Raes
(Belgium) Jimmy Van Den Winkel	4–2	(Belgium) Raf Vervoort
(England) Les Dodd	4–1	(Netherlands) Jeroen Van Driel
(Belgium) Pascal Durnez	3–4	(Belgium) Wai Hin Chu
(England) Sydney Wilson	w/d–w/o	(Belgium) Peter Bullen
(Netherlands) Rogier van der Kamp	0–4	(Belgium) Laurens De Staelen
(Germany) Ronni Beniesch	1–4	(Belgium) Claudio Mercurio
(Netherlands) Florian Moederscheim	3–4	(Belgium) Andy Van Landeghem
(England) Sam Harvey	4–3	(Belgium) Yorben Vervondel
(England) Jonathan Birch	4–0	(France) Johan Lorek
(Belgium) Tomasz Skalski	2–4	(Belgium) Wilfried Ide
(England) Liam Monk	4–0	(Belgium) Bruno Cottenies

==== Round 3 ====
Best of 7 frames

(China) Zhang Anda	4–0	(England) Reanne Evans
(China) Chen Zhe	4–0	(Belgium) Patrick Geysels
(Republic of Ireland) Joe Delaney	4–0	(England) Phil O'Kane
(France) Yannick Poulain	0–4	(England) Stephen Craigie
(Wales) Alex Taubman	0–4	(Belgium) Jurian Heusdens
(England) Justin Astley	4–2	(England) Shane Castle
(Belgium) Nicky Godeyne	1–4	(Netherlands) Mario Wehrmann
(Netherlands) Roy Stolk	2–4	(Wales) Gareth Allen
(England) Lee Page	4–0	(Belgium) Luc Heirewegh
(Belgium) Mathijs Bokken	0–4	(England) Matthew Day
(England) Christopher Henry	2–4	(England) Kyren Wilson
(Belgium) Dirk Coppens	3–4	(Belgium) Thomas Broeckx
(England) Ian Burns	4–0	(Belgium) Kevin Jacobs
(Belgium) Tim Van Gouberghen	4–0	(Wales) Andrew Rogers
(England) Michael Wasley	2–4	(England) Robbie Williams
(England) Martin Ball	4–3	(England) Sean O'Sullivan

(France) Stéphane Ochoïski	0–4	(England) Martin O'Donnell
(England) Mark Vincent	4–0	(Belgium) Tom Vervoort
(Belgium) Jürgen Vandenbossche	4–3	(England) Nick Jennings
(England) Ben Harrison	3–4	(England) Ryan Causton
(Belgium) Ahmed Osman	2–4	(Scotland) Jonathan Fulcher
(Belgium) Yannick Sablon	4–0	(Netherlands) Maarten Niessen
(England) Ashley Wright	4–2	(Belgium) Kevin Van Hove
(England) Allan Taylor	4–0	(England) Greg Davis
(England) Jamie O'Neill	4–0	(England) Chris Norbury
(Belgium) Davy Wittoeck	1–4	(Belgium) Rene Hemelsoet
(England) Gary Wilson	4–0	(Belgium) Jimmy Van Den Winkel
(England) Les Dodd	4–0	(Belgium) Wai Hin Chu
(Belgium) Peter Bullen	4–0	(Belgium) Laurens De Staelen
(Belgium) Claudio Mercurio	0–4	(Belgium) Andy Van Landeghem
(England) Sam Harvey	4–1	(England) Jonathan Birch
(Belgium) Wilfried Ide	1–4	(England) Liam Monk

=== Main rounds ===
==== Top half ====
===== Section 1 =====
Last 128; Best of 7 frames
(England) Ronnie O'Sullivan	4
(England) Anthony Hamilton	0
(England) Adam Duffy	3
(England) Adam Wicheard	4
(England) Andrew Norman	4
(China) Zhang Anda	2
(Thailand) James Wattana	4
(China) Chen Zhe	1
(Scotland) Stephen Hendry	4
(Republic of Ireland) Joe Delaney	1
(England) Stephen Lee	4
(England) Stephen Craigie	0
(England) Joe Jogia	4
(England) Alfie Burden	3
(Thailand) Passakorn Suwannawat	4
(Belgium) Jurian Heusdens	2

Last 64; Best of 7 frames
(England) Ronnie O'Sullivan	4
(England) Adam Wicheard	1
(England) Andrew Norman	4
(Thailand) James Wattana	2
(Scotland) Stephen Hendry	3
(England) Stephen Lee	4
(England) Joe Jogia	3
(Thailand) Passakorn Suwannawat	4

Last 32; Best of 7 frames
(England) Ronnie O'Sullivan	4
(England) Andrew Norman	0
(England) Stephen Lee	4
(Thailand) Passakorn Suwannawat	2

Last 16; Best of 7 frames
(England) Ronnie O'Sullivan	4
(England) Stephen Lee	2

===== Section 2 =====
Last 128; Best of 7 frames
(England) Stuart Bingham	0
(England) Justin Astley	4
(Norway) Kurt Maflin	4
(Wales) Daniel Wells	0
(Australia) Neil Robertson	4
(Netherlands) Mario Wehrmann	0
(Wales) Jamie Jones	1
(China) Cao Yupeng	4
(Wales) Michael White	w/o
(Finland) Robin Hull	w/d
(Scotland) Stephen Maguire	4
(Wales) Gareth Allen	0
(England) Steve Davis	4
(England) Lee Page	1
(England) Liam Highfield	4
(England) Matthew Day	0

Last 64; Best of 7 frames
(England) Justin Astley	0
(Norway) Kurt Maflin	4
(Australia) Neil Robertson	4
(China) Cao Yupeng	2
(Wales) Michael White	4
(Scotland) Stephen Maguire	3
(England) Steve Davis	4
(England) Liam Highfield	1

Last 32; Best of 7 frames
(Norway) Kurt Maflin	3
(Australia) Neil Robertson	4
(Wales) Michael White	4
(England) Steve Davis	2

Last 16; Best of 7 frames
(Australia) Neil Robertson	4
(Wales) Michael White	1

===== Section 3 =====
Last 128; Best of 7 frames
(England) Barry Hawkins	4
(England) Kyren Wilson	1
(Republic of Ireland) David Morris	4
(England) Stuart Carrington	3
(England) Mark King	4
(Belgium) Thomas Broeckx	0
(England) Peter Lines	w/o
(Scotland) Scott MacKenzie	w/d
(Wales) Andrew Pagett	4
(England) Ian Burns	0
(England) Michael Holt	4
(England) Shaun Murphy	3
(Scotland) Marcus Campbell	2
(England) Jack Lisowski	4
(England) Joe Perry	3
(China) Liu Song	4

Last 64; Best of 7 frames
(England) Barry Hawkins	3
(Republic of Ireland) David Morris	4
(England) Mark King	1
(England) Peter Lines	4
(Wales) Andrew Pagett	4
(England) Michael Holt	1
(England) Jack Lisowski	4
(China) Liu Song	1

Last 32; Best of 7 frames
(Republic of Ireland) David Morris	4
(England) Peter Lines	2
(Wales) Andrew Pagett	2
(England) Jack Lisowski	4

Last 16; Best of 7 frames
(Republic of Ireland) David Morris	0
(England) Jack Lisowski	4

===== Section 4 =====
Last 128; Best of 7 frames
(Thailand) Dechawat Poomjaeng	4
(China) Liu Chuang	3
(England) Andrew Higginson	4
(Poland) Kacper Filipiak	0
(England) David Gilbert	0
(China) Liang Wenbo	4
(Scotland) Graeme Dott	4
(England) Peter Ebdon	3
(England) Simon Bedford	w/d
(China) Tian Pengfei	w/o
(Scotland) Alan McManus	4
(Belgium) Tim Van Gouberghen	0
(England) Ben Woollaston	4
(England) Robbie Williams	1
(England) Ricky Walden	4
(England) Martin Ball	2

Last 64; Best of 7 frames
(Thailand) Dechawat Poomjaeng	2
(England) Andrew Higginson	4
(China) Liang Wenbo	3
(Scotland) Graeme Dott	4
(China) Tian Pengfei	2
(Scotland) Alan McManus	4
(England) Ben Woollaston	4
(England) Ricky Walden	3

Last 32; Best of 7 frames
(England) Andrew Higginson	3
(Scotland) Graeme Dott	4
(Scotland) Alan McManus	4
(England) Ben Woollaston	1

Last 16; Best of 7 frames
(Scotland) Graeme Dott	4
(Scotland) Alan McManus	2

==== Bottom half ====
===== Section 5 =====
Last 128; Best of 7 frames
(England) Judd Trump	4
(England) Martin O'Donnell	1
(England) Craig Steadman	4
(England) Mark Vincent	2
(England) Jimmy White	4
(Belgium) Bjorn Haneveer	2
(England) Sam Baird	4
(Belgium) Jürgen Vandenbossche	2
(England) Nigel Bond	4
(England) Robert Milkins	3
(Republic of Ireland) Fergal O'Brien	4
(England) Ryan Causton	0
(England) Rory McLeod	4
(England) Ian McCulloch	1
(England) Tom Ford	4
(England) David Grace	1

Last 64; Best of 7 frames
(England) Judd Trump	4
(England) Craig Steadman	2
(England) Jimmy White	4
(England) Sam Baird	2
(England) Nigel Bond	3
(Republic of Ireland) Fergal O'Brien	4
(England) Rory McLeod	1
(England) Tom Ford	4

Last 32; Best of 7 frames
(England) Judd Trump	4
(England) Jimmy White	3
(Republic of Ireland) Fergal O'Brien	1
(England) Tom Ford	4

Last 16; Best of 7 frames
(England) Judd Trump	4
(England) Tom Ford	0

===== Section 6 =====
Last 128; Best of 7 frames
(England) Jimmy Robertson	4
(England) Adrian Gunnell	1
(England) Mike Dunn	4
(Wales) Mark Williams	1
(England) Ali Carter	4
(Scotland) Jonathan Fulcher	0
(England) Jamie Cope	4
(Belgium) Yannick Sablon	1
(Scotland) John Higgins	4
(England) Matthew Couch	2
(Wales) Ryan Day	2
(England) Ashley Wright	4
(Republic of Ireland) Ken Doherty	4
(England) Allan Taylor	1
(China) Yu Delu	1
(Republic of Ireland) David Hogan	4

Last 64; Best of 7 frames
(England) Jimmy Robertson	0
(England) Mike Dunn	4
(England) Ali Carter	3
(England) Jamie Cope	4
(Scotland) John Higgins	4
(England) Ashley Wright	0
(Republic of Ireland) Ken Doherty	4
(Republic of Ireland) David Hogan	0

Last 32; Best of 7 frames
(England) Mike Dunn	4
(England) Jamie Cope	1
(Scotland) John Higgins	4
(Republic of Ireland) Ken Doherty	1

Last 16; Best of 7 frames
(England) Mike Dunn	0
(Scotland) John Higgins	4

===== Section 7 =====
Last 128; Best of 7 frames
(England) Mark Joyce	3
(India) Aditya Mehta	4
(England) Matthew Selt	4
(England) Barry Pinches	2
(Belgium) Luca Brecel	4
(England) Jamie O'Neill	2
(England) Sam Craigie	4
(India) Lucky Vatnani	0
(Wales) Matthew Stevens	4
(Belgium) Rene Hemelsoet	3
(Scotland) Anthony McGill	1
(Hong Kong) Marco Fu	4
(England) Dave Harold	2
(England) Gary Wilson	4
(England) Mark Davis	4
(England) Les Dodd	0

Last 64; Best of 7 frames
(India) Aditya Mehta	4
(England) Matthew Selt	1
(Belgium) Luca Brecel	4
(England) Sam Craigie	1
(Wales) Matthew Stevens	4
(Hong Kong) Marco Fu	3
(England) Gary Wilson	2
(England) Mark Davis	4

Last 32; Best of 7 frames
(India) Aditya Mehta	4
(Belgium) Luca Brecel	2
(Wales) Matthew Stevens	4
(England) Mark Davis	2

Last 16; Best of 7 frames
(India) Aditya Mehta	4
(Wales) Matthew Stevens	3

===== Section 8 =====
Last 128; Best of 7 frames
(China) Li Yan	1
(Belgium) Peter Bullen	4
(Wales) Dominic Dale	4
(England) Rod Lawler	2
(Scotland) Jamie Burnett	w/d
(England) Paul Davison	w/o
(England) Martin Gould	4
(Northern Ireland) Joe Swail	0
(England) Andy Hicks	4
(Belgium) Andy Van Landeghem	0
(Malta) Tony Drago	3
(Northern Ireland) Gerard Greene	4
(China) Xiao Guodong	4
(England) Sam Harvey	1
(England) Mark Selby	4
(England) Liam Monk	1

Last 64; Best of 7 frames
(Belgium) Peter Bullen	2
(Wales) Dominic Dale	4
(England) Paul Davison	2
(England) Martin Gould	4
(England) Andy Hicks	4
(Northern Ireland) Gerard Greene	0
(China) Xiao Guodong	2
(England) Mark Selby	4

Last 32; Best of 7 frames
(Wales) Dominic Dale	2
(England) Martin Gould	4
(England) Andy Hicks	4
(England) Mark Selby	1

Last 16; Best of 7 frames
(England) Martin Gould	4
(England) Andy Hicks	3

==== Finals ====
Quarter-finals; Best of 7 frames		Semi-finals; Best of 7 frames		Final; Best of 7 frames
(England) Ronnie O'Sullivan	4
(Australia) Neil Robertson	1	(England) Ronnie O'Sullivan	4
(England) Jack Lisowski	2	(Scotland) Graeme Dott	1
(Scotland) Graeme Dott	4			(England) Ronnie O'Sullivan	3
(England) Judd Trump	4			(England) Judd Trump	4
(Scotland) John Higgins	2	(England) Judd Trump	4
(India) Aditya Mehta	1	(England) Martin Gould	1
(England) Martin Gould	4

== Century breaks ==
Only from last 128 onwards.

- 137 – Nigel Bond
- 136 – Liu Chuang
- 135 – Dominic Dale
- 133, 110, 101 – Jack Lisowski
- 132, 118, 116, 105, 100 – Ronnie O'Sullivan
- 130 – Graeme Dott
- 128, 124, 119, 100 – Judd Trump
- 127, 119, 105, 100 – Neil Robertson
- 124 – Cao Yupeng
- 120 – Ricky Walden
- 120 – John Higgins
- 120 – Matthew Stevens
- 119, 118, 102 – Mark Selby
- 119 – Mark King
- 119 – Steve Davis
- 118 – Aditya Mehta
- 117 – Ryan Day
- 112, 106 – Alan McManus
- 112 – Jamie Jones
- 110 – Michael Holt
- 109, 101 – David Morris
- 108 – David Hogan
- 108 – Jimmy White
- 106 – Andrew Higginson
- 105 – Stephen Hendry
- 104 – Jamie Cope
- 103 – Marcus Campbell
- 103 – Barry Pinches
- 101 – Mark Davis
- 100 – Andy Hicks
- 100 – Ken Doherty
