= Wanderson =

Wanderson is a given name, a Brazilian variant of the given name and surname Anderson. Notable people with the name include:

- Wanderson de Paula Sabino (born 1977), known as Somália, Brazilian striker
- Wanderson (footballer, born 1980), full name Wanderson Pereira Rodrigues, Brazilian football midfielder
- Wánderson (footballer, born 1986), full name Francisco Wánderson do Carmo Carneiro, Brazilian football midfielder
- Wanderson Cafu (born 1986), full name Wanderson Gustavo da Silva, Brazilian football right-back
- Wanderson Souza Carneiro known as Baiano (born 1987), Brazilian football right-back
- Wanderson (footballer, born 1988), full name Wanderson Cristaldo Farias, Bulgarian football attacking midfielder
- Wanderson (footballer, born 1989), full name Wanderson Carvalho de Oliveira, Brazilian football wingback
- Wanderson (footballer, born 1990), full name Wanderson Miranda Francisco, Brazilian football midfielder
- Wanderson (footballer, born February 1991), full name Wanderson Santos Pereira, Brazilian football centre-back
- Wanderson (footballer, born September 1991), full name Wanderson Henrique do Nascimento Silva, Brazilian football left-back
- Wanderson (footballer, born 1992), full name Wanderson de Macedo Costa, Brazilian football forward
- Wanderson (footballer, born February 1994), full name Wanderson Costa Viana, Brazilian football winger
- Wanderson (footballer, born 7 October 1994), full name Wanderson Maciel Sousa Campos, Brazilian football winger
- Wanderson (footballer, born 24 October 1994), full name Wanderson Camelo Viana, Brazilian football centre-back

== See also ==
- Anderson (disambiguation)
- Vanderson
