= European Snooker Championship =

European Snooker Championship may refer to:

- EBSA European Snooker Championship, premier amateur snooker tournament
- European Masters (snooker), professional ranking snooker tournament
