= Antwerp Open (snooker) =

Tournament information
- Venue: Lotto Arena
- Location: Antwerp
- Country: Belgium
- Established: 2011
- Organisation(s): World Professional Billiards and Snooker Association
- Format: Minor-ranking event
- Total prize fund: €129,178
- Final year: 2013
- Final champion: (England) Mark Selby

The Antwerp Open was a pro–am minor-ranking snooker tournament, which was part of the Players Tour Championship. The tournament started in 2011 and was staged at the Lotto Arena in Antwerp, Belgium. Mark Selby was the last champion.

== Winners ==
Year	Winner	Runner-up	Final score	Season
2011	(England) Judd Trump	(England) Ronnie O'Sullivan	4–3	2011/12
2012	(Northern Ireland) Mark Allen	(England) Mark Selby	4–1	2012/13
2013	(England) Mark Selby	(England) Ronnie O'Sullivan	4–3	2013/14

== See also ==
- 2010 Brugge Open
