= Vanderson =

Vanderson is a given name. Notable people with the name include:

- Vanderson Válter de Almeida (born 1978), Brazilian footballer
- Vanderson da Silva Souza (born 1986), Brazilian footballer
- Vanderson Stolk Francisco (born 1987), Brazilian footballer
- Vanderson (footballer, born 2001), Brazilian fullback
