= Wanderson (footballer, born 1980) =

Brazilian footballer

Personal information
- Full name: Wanderson Pereira Rodrigues
- Date of birth: 6 October 1980 (age 46)
- Place of birth: Ji-Paraná, Brazil
- Height: 1.81 m (5 ft 11 in)
- Position: Midfielder

Team information
- Current team: Ji-Paraná

Youth career
- Ji-Paraná

Senior career*
| Years | Team | Apps | (Gls) |
| 1997–1999 | Ji-Paraná | | |
| 2000 | Prudentópolis | | |
| 2001 | Toledo | | |
| 2002 | Grêmio Maringá | | |
| 2003–2004 | União Cacoalense | | |
| 2005–2009 | Ulbra Ji-Paraná | | |
| 2009 | Canoas | | |
| 2009 | Ariquemes | | |
| 2009 | Genus | | |
| 2010 | São Luiz | 0 | (0) |
| 2011 | Pelotas | 0 | (0) |
| 2011 | Vilhena | | |
| 2012–2015 | Chapecoense | 93 | (3) |
| 2016–2017 | Juventude | 21 | (0) |
| 2018 | Real Ariquemes | 4 | (0) |
| 2016– | Ji-Paraná | | |
- * Club domestic league appearances and goals as of 00:04, 30 May 2019 (UTC)

Wanderson Pereira Rodrigues (born 6 October 1980), colloquially known as Wanderson, is a Brazilian footballer who plays for Ji-Paraná as a midfielder.

== Career ==
Born in Ji-Paraná, Rondônia, Wanderson made his senior debuts with hometown's Ji-Paraná, being crowned champions of Campeonato Rondoniense while aged just 17. After three years in Paraná representing Prudentópolis, Toledo and Grêmio Maringá, he returned to his native state, signing for União Cacoalense.

Wanderson rotated through clubs in the same state, and moved to Rio Grande do Sul with São Luiz in 2010. On 29 November 2010 he moved to Pelotas, but left the club on 26 April of the following year, moving to Vilhena.

On 7 December 2011 Wanderson joined Chapecoense, in Série C. After achieving promotion to Série B in 2012, and made his professional debut on 24 May 2013, starting and scoring the third in a 4–1 away win against Boa Esporte.

Wanderson appeared in 30 matches and scored two goals during the campaign, with his side being promoted to Série A for the first time ever. He made his top level debut on 19 April 2014, playing the full 90 minutes in a 0–0 home draw against Coritiba.
