= EBSA European Snooker Championship =

Amateur snooker tournament

The EBSA European Snooker Championship is the premier amateur snooker tournament in Europe, sanctioned by the European Billiards and Snooker Association (EBSA). There are multiple formats of snooker to be competed in two seasonal events annually, including the spring event to hold the men's and junior Championship and the autumn event to hold the women's, senior, disability, shoot-out, 6-reds and team Championships.

The men's event, being the major competition of the Championship, first took place in 1988 and has been held annually since 1993. In most years, the winner of the tournament qualifies for the next two seasons of the World Snooker Tour.

== Men's finals ==
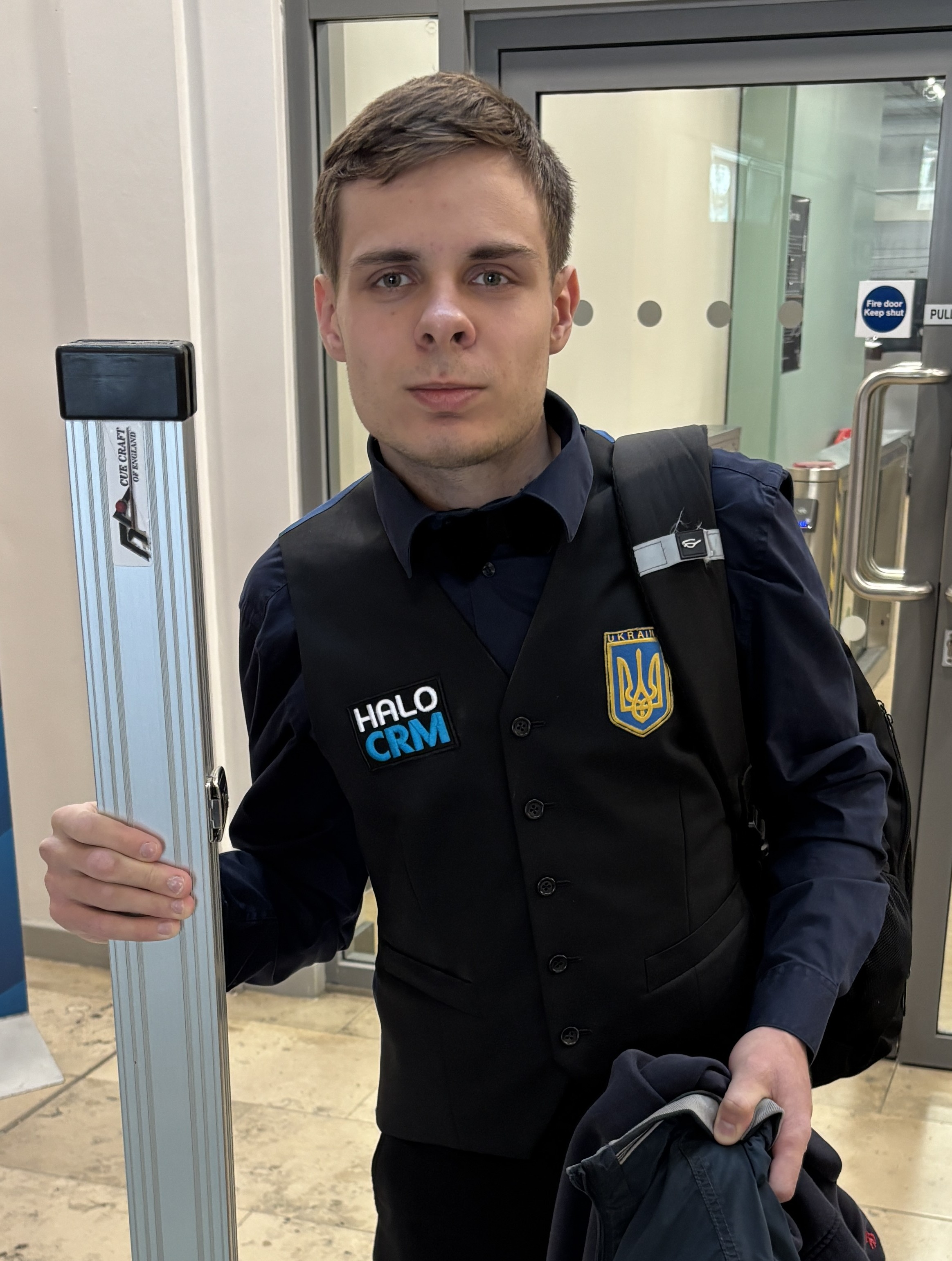
2026 champion Anton Kazakov

Year	Venue	Winner	Runner-up	Score	Ref
1988	Scheveningen, Netherlands	(England) Stefan Mazrocis	(Malta) Paul Mifsud	11–7	
1993	Helsinki, Finland	(England) Neil Mosley	(Finland) Robin Hull	8–6	
1994	Budapest, Hungary	(Belgium) Danny Lathouwers	(Belgium) Stefan van der Borght	8–2	
1995	Belfast, Northern Ireland	(England) David Lilley	(England) David Gray	8–7	
1996	Antwerp, Belgium	(Scotland) Graham Horne	(Iceland) Kristján Helgason	8–5	
1997	Biarritz, France	(Finland) Robin Hull	(Iceland) Kristján Helgason	7–3	
1998	Helsinki, Finland	(Iceland) Kristján Helgason	(Malta) Alex Borg	7–2	
1999	Enschede, Netherlands	(Belgium) Bjorn Haneveer	(Wales) David Bell	7–0	
2000	Stirling, Scotland	(England) Craig Butler	(Belgium) Bjorn Haneveer	7–3	
2001	Riga, Latvia	(Belgium) Bjorn Haneveer	(England) Kurt Maflin	7–6	
2002	Kalisz, Poland	(Wales) David John	(Scotland) David McLellan	7–2	
2003	Bad Wildungen, Germany	(Wales) David John	(Wales) Andrew Pagett	7–3	
2004	Völkermarkt, Austria	(Northern Ireland) Mark Allen	(Malta) Alex Borg	7–6	
2005	Ostrów Wielkopolski, Poland	(Malta) Alex Borg	(Iceland) Kristján Helgason	7–2	
2006	Constanța, Romania	(Malta) Alex Borg	(England) Jeff Cundy	7–5	
2007	Carlow, Ireland	(Belgium) Kevin Van Hove	(Republic of Ireland) Rodney Goggins	7–2	
2008	Lublin, Poland	(England) David Grace	(England) Craig Steadman	7–6	
2009	Duffel, Belgium	(Republic of Ireland) David Hogan	(Republic of Ireland) Mario Fernandez	7–4	
2010	Bucharest, Romania	(Belgium) Luca Brecel	(Netherlands) Roy Stolk	7–4	
2011	Sofia, Bulgaria	(Wales) Daniel Wells	(Republic of Ireland) Vincent Muldoon	7–4	
2012	Daugavpils, Latvia	(Scotland) Scott Donaldson	(Republic of Ireland) Brendan O'Donoghue	7–3	
2013	Zielona Góra, Poland	(Finland) Robin Hull	(Wales) Gareth Allen	7–2	
2014	Sofia, Bulgaria	(England) Mitchell Mann	(England) John Whitty	7–2	
2015	Prague, Czech Republic	(England) Michael Wild	(Wales) Jamie Clarke	7–4	
2016	Wrocław, Poland	(Wales) Jak Jones	(Wales) Jamie Clarke	7–4	
2017	Nicosia, Cyprus	(Scotland) Chris Totten	(Estonia) Andres Petrov	7–3	
2018	Sofia, Bulgaria	(England) Harvey Chandler	(Northern Ireland) Jordan Brown	7–2	
2019	Eilat, Israel	(Poland) Kacper Filipiak	(England) David Lilley	5–4	
2020	Albufeira, Portugal	(Wales) Andrew Pagett	(Finland) Heikki Niva	5–2	
2021	Albufeira, Portugal	(England) Oliver Brown	(Russia) Ivan Kakovskii	5–4	
2022	Shengjin, Albania	(Estonia) Andres Petrov	(Belgium) Ben Mertens	5–3	
2023	St. Paul's Bay, Malta	(Scotland) Ross Muir	(Scotland) Michael Collumb	5–1	
2024	Sarajevo, Bosnia and Herzegovina	(Northern Ireland) Robbie McGuigan	(England) Craig Steadman	5–4	
2025	Antalya, Turkey	(England) Liam Highfield	(Poland) Michał Szubarczyk	5–0	
2026	Gandia, Spain	(Ukraine) Anton Kazakov	(England) Oliver Sykes	5–4	

=== Champions by country ===
Country	Wins	Winners	First title	Last title
England	10	10	1988	2025
Belgium	5	4	1994	2010
Wales	5	4	2002	2020
Scotland	4	4	1996	2023
Northern Ireland	2	2	2004	2024
Finland	2	1	1997	2013
Malta	2	1	2005	2006
Iceland	1	1	1998	1998
Ireland	1	1	2009	2009
Poland	1	1	2019	2019
Estonia	1	1	2022	2022
Ukraine	1	1	2026	2026

== Women's finals ==
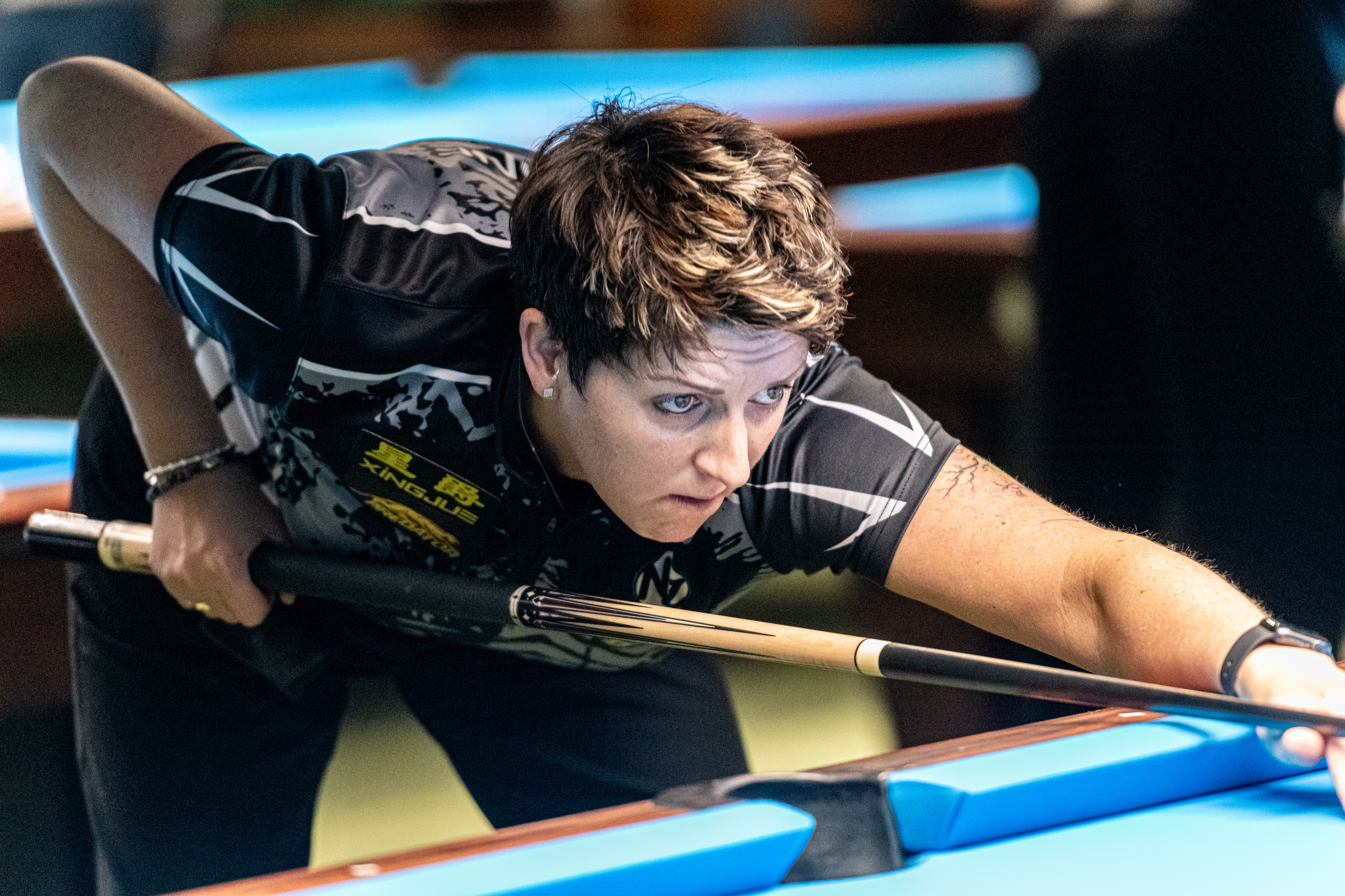
Kelly Fisher (pictured in 2022) won the title seven times

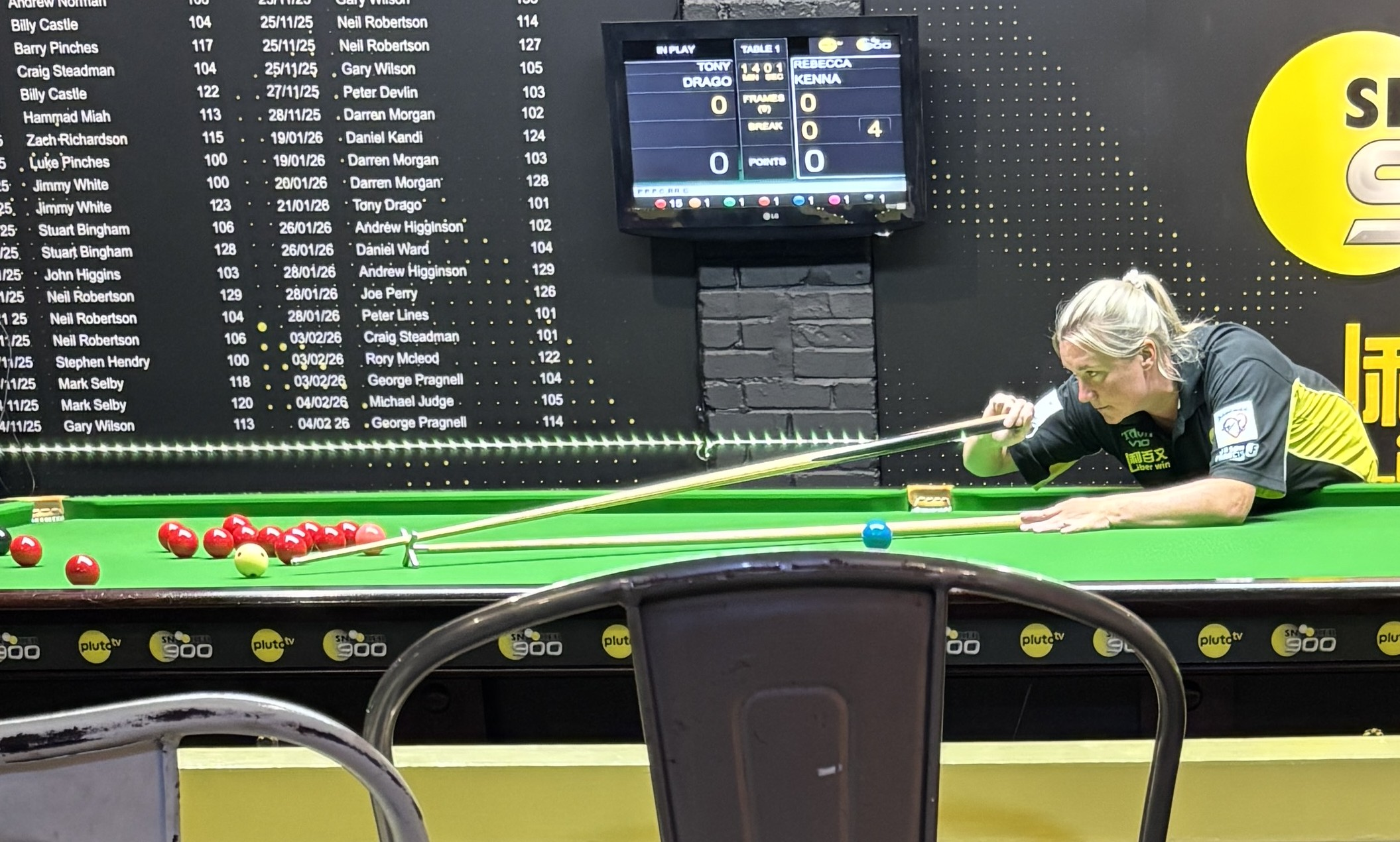
Rebecca Kenna (pictured in 2026) won the 2025 edition and was runner-up in 2026

Year	Venue	Winner	Runner-up	Score
1996	Antwerp, Belgium	(England) Kelly Fisher	(Northern Ireland) Karen Corr	6–3
1997	Biarritz, France	(England) Kelly Fisher	(England) Kim Shaw	5–3
1998	Helsinki, Finland	(Northern Ireland) Karen Corr	(England) Kelly Fisher	5–2
1999	Enschede, Netherlands	(England) Kelly Fisher	(Belgium) Wendy Jans	5–2
2000	Stirling, Scotland	(England) Kelly Fisher	(Belgium) Wendy Jans	5–0
2001	Riga, Latvia	(England) Kelly Fisher	(Belgium) Wendy Jans	5–3
2002	Kalisz, Poland	(England) Kelly Fisher	(Belgium) Wendy Jans	5–0
2003	Bad Wildungen, Germany	(England) Kelly Fisher	(Belgium) Wendy Jans	5–4
2004	Völkermarkt, Austria	(Belgium) Wendy Jans	(England) Reanne Evans	5–3
2005	Ostrów Wielkopolski, Poland	(Belgium) Wendy Jans	(England) Katie Henrick	5–3
2006	Constanța, Romania	(Belgium) Wendy Jans	(Belgium) Isabelle Jonckheere	5–0
2007	Carlow, Ireland	(England) Reanne Evans	(Belgium) Wendy Jans	5–2
2008	Lublin, Poland	(England) Reanne Evans	(England) Emma Bonney	5–3
2009	Duffel, Belgium	(Belgium) Wendy Jans	(Russia) Anna Mazhirina	5–0
2010	Bucharest, Romania	(Belgium) Wendy Jans	(Germany) Diana Stateczny	5–3
2011	Sofia, Bulgaria	(Belgium) Wendy Jans	(Latvia) Tatjana Vasiljeva	5–1
2012	Daugavpils, Latvia	(Latvia) Tatjana Vasiljeva	(Belgium) Wendy Jans	5–4
2013	Zielona Góra, Poland	(Belgium) Wendy Jans	(Russia) Anastasia Nechaeva	5–1
2014	Sofia, Bulgaria	(Belgium) Wendy Jans	(Russia) Anastasia Nechaeva	5–0
2015	Prague, Czech Republic	(Belgium) Wendy Jans	(Russia) Daria Sirotina	5–0
2016	Vilnius, Lithuania	(Belgium) Wendy Jans	(Russia) Daria Sirotina	5–4
2017	Shengjin, Albania	(Belgium) Wendy Jans	(Latvia) Anna Prysazhnuka	5–1
2018	Bucharest, Romania	(Belgium) Wendy Jans	(Belgium) Cathy Dehaene	4–0
2019	Belgrade, Serbia	(Germany) Diana Stateczny	(Russia) Anastasia Nechaeva	4–2
2021	Albufeira, Portugal	(Belgium) Wendy Jans	(England) Jamie Hunter	4–1
2022	Shengjin, Albania	(Belgium) Wendy Jans	(Germany) Diana Stateczny	4–1
2023	Albena, Bulgaria	(Latvia) Anna Prysazhnuka	(Belgium) Wendy Jans	4–3
2024	Albufeira , Portugal	(England) Rebecca Kenna	(Latvia) Anna Prysazhnuka	4–1
2025	Golem, Albania	(Latvia) Anna Prysazhnuka	(England) Rebecca Kenna	4–3

== See also ==
- EBSA European Under-21 Snooker Championships
- EBSA European Under-18 Snooker Championships
- European Masters (snooker)
- World Snooker Tour
