= Diana Schuler =

German snooker player

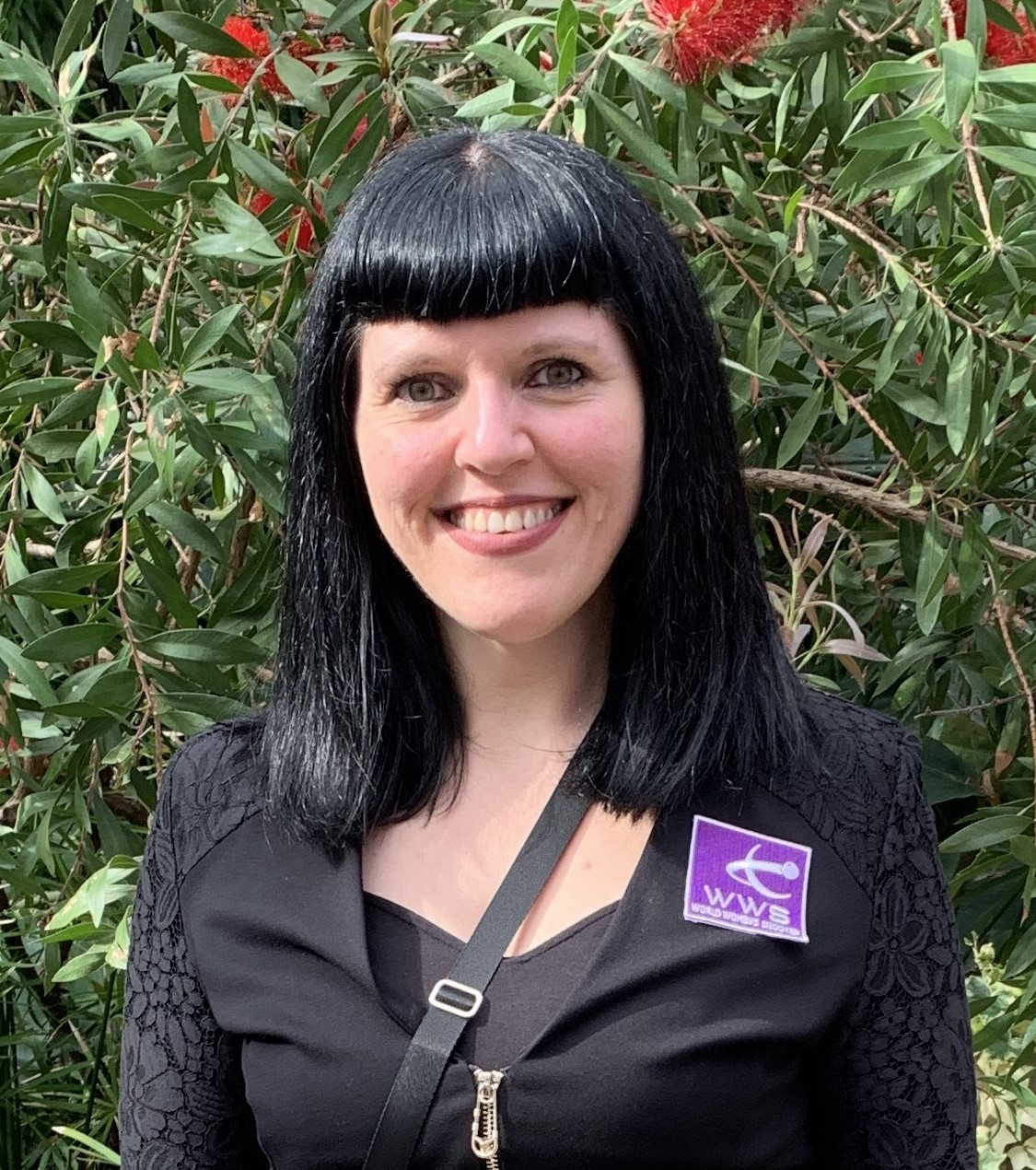
- Schuler in 2024

Personal information
- Born: 18 April 1981 (age 45) Saarbrücken, West Germany

Sport
- Country: Germany
- Sport: Snooker

Diana Schuler (born 18 April 1981) is a German snooker player. Schuler started playing pool in 1995 at the age of 14 in her friend's aunt's café. and took up snooker in 2010. In April 2015, Schuler was appointed as a board member and as the Marketing Director of World Women's Snooker. Her highest ranking in the World Women's Snooker rankings has been 8th.

She ran a vintage clothing and accessories e-commerce business for 15 years, and is now an E-Commerce Manager for company in Germany

Schuler beat Daniel Dieudonne 4-3 and Ronni Beniesch 4-0 before losing 0–4 to Anthony Hamilton at the Euro Players Tour Championship 2010/2011 – Event 1.

Mark Williams made an official maximum break during his 4–0 defeat of Schuler at the Euro Players Tour Championship 2010/2011 – Event 3.
