= Vanderson (footballer, born 1987) =

Brazilian footballer

Personal information
- Full name: Vanderson Stolk Francisco
- Date of birth: February 26, 1987 (age 39)
- Place of birth: Florianópolis, Brazil
- Height: 1.81 m (5 ft 11 in)
- Position: Left-back

Team information
- Current team: Guarani de Palhoça

Youth career
- 2005: Figueirense

Senior career*
Years	Team	Apps	(Gls)
2006–2008	Figueirense	3	(0)
2007	→ Cabofriense (loan)		
2008	Joinville		
2009	Volta Redonda	7	(0)
2009	Macaé		
2010	Juventus-SC		
2011	Central	21	(3)
2011	Icasa	4	(0)
2012–2013	Guaratinguetá	3	(0)
2014–	Guarani de Palhoça		
- * Club domestic league appearances and goals

Vanderson Stolk Francisco or simply Vanderson (born February 26, 1987, in Florianópolis), is a Brazilian footballer who play as a left-back for Guarani de Palhoça.

He made his professional debut for Figueirense in a 3–1 away defeat against Vasco in the Campeonato Brasileiro on August 25, 2006.
