= Andrew Pagett =

Welsh snooker player (born 1982)

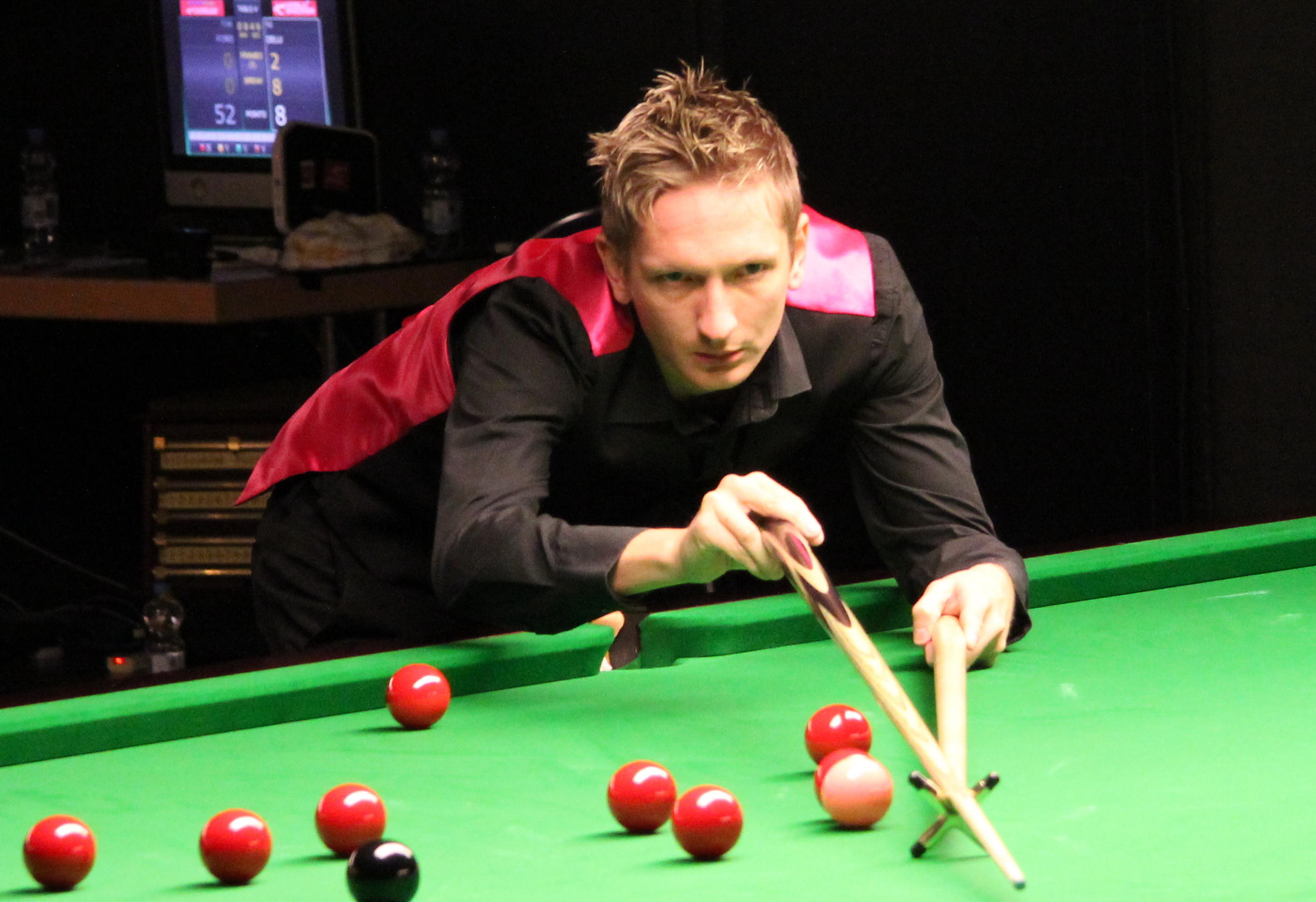
- Pagett at the 2011 Paul Hunter Classic

Personal information
- Nickname: The Welsh Wizard
- Born: 25 April 1982 (age 44) Newport, Wales

Sport
- Country: Wales
- Sport: Snooker
- Professional: 2008–2009, 2010–2012, 2013–2015, 2021–2025
- Highest ranking: 42 (June–July 2011, October 2011)
- Best ranking finish: Last 32 (x5)

Andrew Pagett (born 25 April 1982) is a Welsh former professional snooker player.

== Career ==
=== Early career ===
He played on Challenge Tour from 2003 to 2005, and first qualified for the Main Tour in 2008–09, but lost his place after just one season. He regained his place for the 2010–11 season by topping the Welsh rankings. He is a practice partner of Mark Williams.

=== 2010/2011 season ===
Pagett qualified for the 2011 World Snooker Championship after winning four qualifying matches. He knocked out Zhang Anda, Bjorn Haneveer and Nigel Bond, before beating Andrew Higginson 10–6 to qualify for the final stages of a major event for the first time, where he was defeated 10–7 by Jamie Cope.

=== 2011/2012 season ===
Pagett began the 2011–12 season ranked 71st in the world meaning he would have to win four qualifying matches to reach the ranking event main draws. However, after attempting to qualify for all eight tournaments he only won two matches; one at the Australian Goldfields Open and the other at the German Masters. Pagett played in 11 of the 12 minor-ranking Players Tour Championship events throughout the season, with his best finishes coming in Event 4 and Event 9, where he reached the last 32. He was ranked number 82 on the PTC Order of Merit. Pagett finished the season without a world ranking and will not play on the main tour in the 2012–13 season.

=== 2012/2013 season ===
Pagett could only enter Players Tour Championship events in the 2012/2013 season, taking part in seven of them. His best finish came in the third European Tour event in Belgium, where he beat Raf van de Maele, Robbie Williams, Stuart Bingham, Thepchaiya Un-Nooh and former world champion Neil Robertson, before losing to Mark Allen 1–4 in the semi-finals. It was this result which largely contributed to him finishing 55th on the Order of Merit to claim one of the eight spots on offer to players not on the main tour for the 2013–14 and 2014–15 seasons.

=== 2013/2014 season ===
Pagett made a dream start to the season as in his first match he defeated world number one Mark Selby 5–3 to qualify for the 2013 Wuxi Classic in China where he lost 2–5 to David Gilbert in the first round. Later in the year he reached the last 32 of a ranking event for only the second time in his career at his home tournament the Welsh Open. Pagett beat Marcus Campbell 4–0 and Gerard Greene 4–3, before losing 0–4 to Stephen Maguire. Pagett ended his first season back on the tour ranked world number 103.

=== 2014/2015 season ===
After losing in the qualifying rounds of the first three events of the 2014–15 season, Pagett beat Rory McLeod 6–3 to play in the International Championship, where he lost 1–6 to Peter Ebdon. He was knocked out of the first round of both the UK Championship and Welsh Open 6–2 by Mike Dunn and 4–2 by McLeod respectively. Pagett's only win at the venue of a ranking this year was a 4–2 success over Zack Richardson at the Indian Open, before he lost 1–4 to Chris Wakelin in the second round. He was relegated from the tour at the end of the season as the number 80 in the world rankings and did not enter Q School.

=== 2020/2021 season ===
Pagett regained his place on the professional circuit following his victory at the 2020 EBSA European Snooker Championship. However, he had to have surgery to correct a perforated bowel which required 4–6 months rest and rehabilitation. His place was therefore deferred to the 2021-22 World Snooker Tour.

== Performance and rankings timeline ==
Tournament	2003/ 04	2004/ 05	2008/ 09	2010/ 11	2011/ 12	2013/ 14	2014/ 15	2016/ 17	2018/ 19	2019/ 20	2020/ 21	2021/ 22	2022/ 23	2023/ 24	2024/ 25	2025/ 26
Ranking (Note: It shows the ranking at the beginning of the season)	(Note: He was an amateur)		(Note: New players don't have a ranking)		71		103				(Note: He was an amateur who qualified for the main tour, but his tour card was deferred until the following season)		82	(Note: Players qualified through the Q School started the season without ranking points)	87	
Ranking tournaments
Championship League	Not Held		Non-Ranking Event								A	RR	RR	RR	RR	RR
Saudi Arabia Masters	Tournament Not Held														3R	
Wuhan Open	Tournament Not Held													LQ	1R	
English Open	Tournament Not Held							A	A	A	A	LQ	LQ	LQ	1R	
British Open	A	A	Tournament Not Held									3R	LQ	LQ	LQ	
Xi'an Grand Prix	Tournament Not Held														LQ	
Northern Ireland Open	Tournament Not Held							A	A	A	A	LQ	LQ	LQ	LQ	
International Championship	Tournament Not Held					LQ	1R	A	A	A	Not Held			LQ	LQ	
UK Championship	A	A	LQ	LQ	LQ	1R	1R	A	A	A	A	1R	LQ	LQ	LQ	
Shoot Out	Not Held			Non-Ranking Event				A	A	2R	A	2R	1R	1R	1R	
Scottish Open (Note: The event was called the Players Championship (2003/2004))	A	Tournament Not Held						A	A	A	A	LQ	LQ	LQ	LQ	
German Masters	Not Held			LQ	LQ	LQ	LQ	A	A	A	A	LQ	LQ	2R	WD	
World Grand Prix	Tournament Not Held							DNQ	DNQ	DNQ	DNQ	DNQ	DNQ	DNQ	DNQ	
Players Championship (Note: The event was called the Players Tour Championship Grand Final (2010/2011–2011/2012 and 2013/2014–2014/2015))	Not Held			DNQ	DNQ	DNQ	DNQ	DNQ	DNQ	DNQ	DNQ	DNQ	DNQ	DNQ	DNQ	
Welsh Open	A	A	LQ	LQ	LQ	3R	1R	A	A	A	A	1R	LQ	1R	LQ	
World Open (Note: The event was called the LG Cup (2003/2004) and the Grand Prix (2004/2005, 2008/2009))	A	A	LQ	LQ	LQ	LQ	NH	A	A	A	Not Held			LQ	WD	
Tour Championship	Tournament Not Held								DNQ	DNQ	DNQ	DNQ	DNQ	DNQ	DNQ	
World Championship	LQ	LQ	LQ	1R	LQ	LQ	LQ	A	A	LQ	A	LQ	LQ	LQ	LQ	
Non-ranking tournaments
The Masters	LQ	A	LQ	A	A	A	A	A	A	A	A	A	A	A	A	
Former ranking tournaments
Northern Ireland Trophy	Not Held		LQ	Tournament Not Held												
Bahrain Championship	Not Held		LQ	Tournament Not Held												
Wuxi Classic (Note: The event was called the Jiangsu Classic (2008/2009))	Not Held		Non-Ranking Event			1R	LQ	Tournament Not Held								
Australian Goldfields Open	Tournament Not Held				LQ	LQ	LQ	Tournament Not Held								
Shanghai Masters	Not Held		LQ	LQ	LQ	LQ	LQ	A	Non-Ranking		Not Held			Non-Ranking		
Paul Hunter Classic	NH	Pro-am		Minor-Ranking Event				A	2R	NR	Tournament Not Held					
Indian Open	Tournament Not Held					LQ	2R	A	A	Tournament Not Held						
China Open	NH	A	LQ	LQ	LQ	LQ	A	A	A	Tournament Not Held						
Riga Masters	Tournament Not Held						MR	A	A	LQ	Tournament Not Held					
Turkish Masters	Tournament Not Held											LQ	Tournament Not Held			
Gibraltar Open	Tournament Not Held						MR	A	A	2R	A	1R	Tournament Not Held			
WST Classic	Tournament Not Held												2R	Not Held		
European Masters (Note: The event was called the European Open (2003/2004) and the Malta Cup (2004/2005))	A	A	Tournament Not Held					A	A	A	A	LQ	LQ	LQ	Not Held	
Former non-ranking tournaments
Six-red World Championship (Note: The event was called the Six-red Snooker International (2008/2009))	Not Held		A	2R	NH	2R	RR	RR	A	A	Not Held		LQ	Not Held		

Performance Table Legend
LQ	lost in the qualifying draw	#R	lost in the early rounds of the tournament (WR = Wildcard round, RR = Round robin)	QF	lost in the quarter-finals
SF	lost in the semi-finals	F	lost in the final	W	won the tournament
DNQ	did not qualify for the tournament	A	did not participate in the tournament	WD	withdrew from the tournament

NH / Not Held	means an event was not held.
NR / Non-Ranking Event	means an event is/was no longer a ranking event.
R / Ranking Event	means an event is/was a ranking event.
MR / Minor-Ranking Event	means an event is/was a minor-ranking event.
PA / Pro-am Event	means an event is/was a pro-am event.

== Career finals ==
=== Amateur finals: 9 (4 titles) ===
Outcome	No.	Year	Championship	Opponent in the final	Score
Runner-up	1.	2003	EBSA European Snooker Championship	(Wales) David John	3–7
Winner	1.	2005	Welsh Amateur Championship	(Wales) Michael White	6–4
Runner-up	2.	2007	PIOS – Event 2	(England) Kuldesh Johal	4–6
Winner	2.	2010	Welsh Amateur Championship	(Wales) Gareth Allen	8–0
Runner-up	3.	2016	IBSF World Snooker Championship	(Iran) Soheil Vahedi	1–8
Runner-up	4.	2019	Challenge Tour – Event 2	(England) Jake Nicholson	1–3
Winner	3.	2019	Challenge Tour – Event 3	(Northern Ireland) Robbie McGuigan	3–1
Runner-up	5.	2019	Challenge Tour – Event 7	(Scotland) Dean Young	1–3
Winner	4.	2020	EBSA European Snooker Championship	(Finland) Heikki Niva	5–2
