= Dutch Amateur Championship (snooker) =

Dutch sporting competition

Tournament information
- Country: Netherland
- Established: 1987; 39 years ago
- Organisation(s): Dutch Billiards & Snooker Association
- Format: Amateur event
- Recent edition: 2019
- Current champion: Joris Maas

The Dutch Amateur Championship is an annual snooker competition played in the Netherlands and is the highest-ranking amateur event in the Netherlands.

The competition was established in 1987, and was won by René Dikstra, who would go on to win four of the first five championships.

== Winners ==
| Year | Winner | Runner-up | Final score | City |
|---|---|---|---|---|
| 1987 | René Dikstra | Wim Braam | 5–0 | The Hague |
| 1988 | René Dikstra | Wim Braam | 7–2 | Alkmaar |
| 1989 | Wim Braam | Wilfred Dijkstra | 5–3 | Rotterdam |
| 1990 | René Dikstra | Wilfred Dijkstra | 5–3 | Rotterdam |
| 1991 | René Dikstra | Pascal Houke | 5–1 | Eindhoven |
| 1992 | Mario Wehrmann | Raymon Fabrie | 5–2 | Warmond |
| 1993 | Wilfred Dijkstra | Raymon Fabrie | 5–2 | Amsterdam |
| 1994 | Raymon Fabrie | Wilfred Dijkstra | 5–1 | Rotterdam |
| 1995 | Mario Wehrmann | Reind Duut | 5–2 | Tilburg |
| 1996 | Raymon Fabrie | Reind Duut | 5–4 | Warmond |
| 1997 | Raymon Fabrie | Wilfred Dijkstra | 5–1 | Warmond |
| 1998 | Raymon Fabrie | Tom Horstman | 5–1 | Warmond |
| 1999 | Roy Stolk | Johan Oenema | 5–3 | Warmond |
| 2000 | Johan Oenema | Raymon Fabrie | 5–4 | Warmond |
| 2001 | Roy Stolk | Johan Oenema | 5–3 | Spijkenisse |
| 2002 | Mario Wehrmann | Rolf de Jong | 5–1 | Spijkenisse |
| 2003 | Raymon Fabrie | Gerrit bij de Leij | 5–1 | Spijkenisse |
| 2004 | Stefan Mazrocis | Rolf de Jong | 5–0 | Zaandam |
| 2005 | Stefan Mazrocis | Gerrit bij de Leij | 5–2 | Ridderkerk |
| 2006 | Rolf de Jong | Ton Berkhoutt | 5–2 | Warmond |
| 2007 | Stefan Mazrocis | Gerrit bij de Leij | 5–4 | Warmond |
| 2008 | Rene van Rijsbergen | Joeri Reisig | 5–2 | Warmond |
| 2009 | Stefan Mazrocis | Gerrit bij de Leij | 5–3 | Warmond |
| 2010 | Roy Stolk | Johan Oenema | 5–2 | Hertogenbosch |
| 2011 | Roy Stolk | Maurice le Duc | 5–4 | Hertogenbosch |
| 2012 | Gerrit bij de Leij | Roy Stolk | 5–1 | Hertogenbosch |
| 2013 | Rene van Rijsbergen | Roy Stolk | 5–4 | Warmond |
| 2014 | Rene van Rijsbergen | Raymon Fabrie | 5–4 | Maassluis |
| 2015 | Richard van Leeuwen | Rene van Rijsbergen | 5–3 | Maassluis |
| 2016 | Rene van Rijsbergen | Joris Maas | 5–3 | Warmond |
| 2017 | Raymon Fabrie | Rene van Rijsbergen | 5–3 | Maassluis |
| 2018 | Roy Stolk | Joris Maas | 5–4 | Zaandam |
| 2019 | Joris Maas | Arya Sohrabi | 5–4 | Zaandam |

== Stats ==
=== Finalists ===
| Rank | Name | Winner | Runner-up | Finals |
|---|---|---|---|---|
| 1 | Raymon Fabrie | 6 | 4 | 10 |
| 2 | Roy Stolk | 5 | 2 | 7 |
| 3 | Rene van Rijsbergen | 4 | 2 | 6 |
| 4 | René Dikstra | 4 | 0 | 4 |
| 4 | Stefan Mazrocis | 4 | 0 | 4 |
| 6 | Mario Wehrmann | 3 | 0 | 3 |
| 7 | Wilfred Dijkstra | 1 | 4 | 5 |
| 7 | Gerrit bij de Leij | 1 | 4 | 5 |
| 9 | Johan Oenema | 1 | 3 | 4 |
| 10 | Wim Braam | 1 | 2 | 3 |
| 10 | Rolf de Jong | 1 | 2 | 3 |
| 10 | Joris Maas | 1 | 2 | 3 |
| 13 | Reind Duut | 0 | 2 | 2 |
| 14 | Pascal Houke | 0 | 1 | 1 |
| 14 | Tom Horstman | 0 | 1 | 1 |
| 14 | Ton Berkhoutt | 0 | 1 | 1 |
| 14 | Joeri Reisig | 0 | 1 | 1 |
| 14 | Maurice le Duc | 0 | 1 | 1 |
| 14 | Arya Sohrabi | 0 | 1 | 1 |
