= Lotto Arena =

Sport arena in Antwerp, Belgium

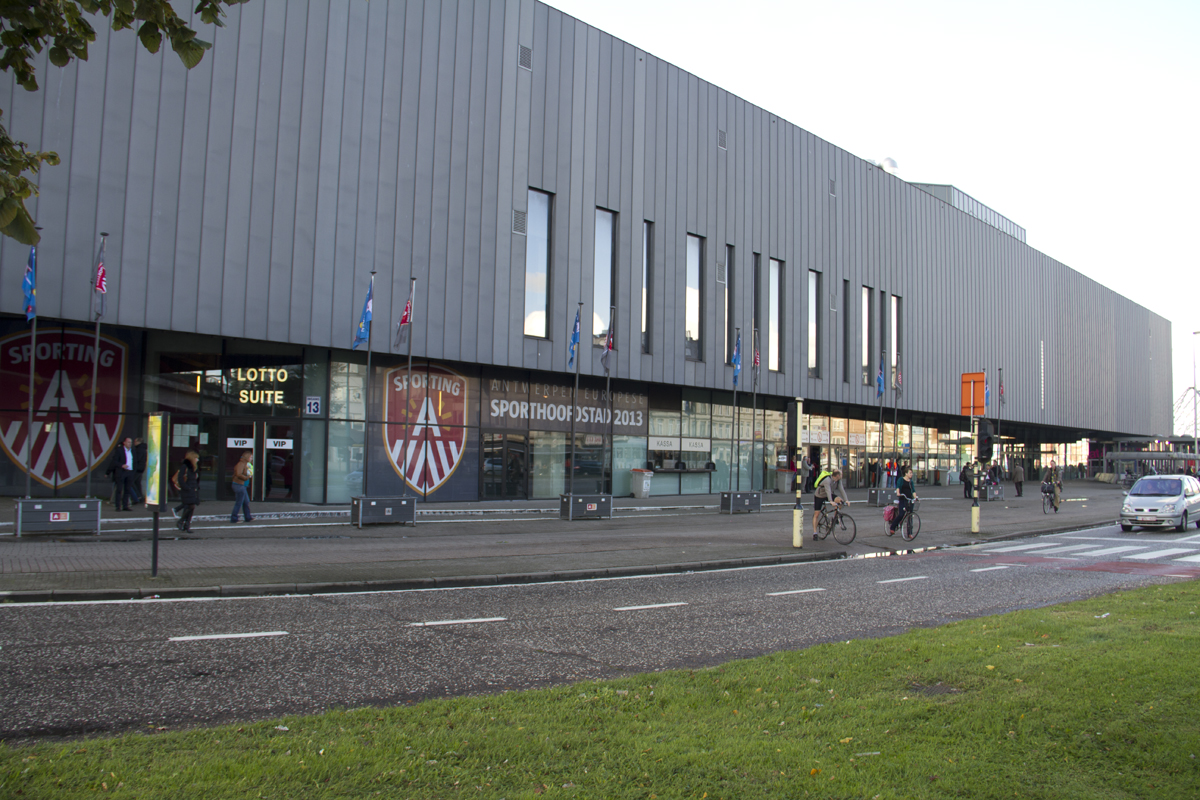
- Interactive map of Lotto Arena
- Location: Antwerp, Belgium
- Coordinates: 51.230264°N 4.441620°E
- Capacity: 5,218 (basketball); 8,050 (concerts)

Construction
- Built: June 2006
- Opened: 10 March 2007

Tenant
- Antwerp Giants (2007–present)

Lotto Arena is an arena in Antwerp, Belgium. It seats 8,050 people for concerts and 5,218 for sporting events. The arena opened on 10 March 2007 after nine months of construction. It is in the district of Merksem.

The Antwerp Giants basketball club uses the arena as its home venue. Until 2024 also hosted the European Open tennis tournament.

== See also ==
- List of indoor arenas in Belgium
