= Roy Stolk =

Dutch snooker player (born 1981)

Personal information
- Born: 11 January 1981 (age 45) Leiden

Sport
- Country: Netherlands
- Sport: Snooker
- Professional: 2006/2007

Roy Stolk (born 11 January 1981 in Leiden) is a Dutch former professional snooker player. Between 2006 and 2007, he was on the Main Tour by winning the Romanian Open. At the end of the season, he slipped off.

== Performance and rankings timeline ==
Tournament	2003/ 04	2006/ 07	2010/ 11	2011/ 12	2012/ 13
Ranking (Note: It shows the ranking at the beginning of the season)	(Note: He was an amateur)	(Note: New players on the Main Tour don't have a ranking)			
Ranking tournaments
UK Championship	A	LQ	A	A	A
Welsh Open	A	LQ	A	A	A
World Open (Note: The event was called the LG Cup (2003/2004) and the Grand Prix (2006/2007))	A	LQ	A	A	A
Players Tour Championship Grand Final	Not Held		DNQ	DNQ	DNQ
China Open	NH	LQ	A	A	A
World Championship	LQ	LQ	A	A	A
Former ranking tournaments
Northern Ireland Trophy	NH	LQ	Not Held		
Malta Cup (Note: The event was called the European Open (2003/2004))	A	LQ	Not Held		

Performance Table Legend
LQ	lost in the qualifying draw	#R	lost in the early rounds of the tournament (WR = Wildcard round, RR = Round robin)	QF	lost in the quarter-finals
SF	lost in the semi-finals	F	lost in the final	W	won the tournament
DNQ	did not qualify for the tournament	A	did not participate in the tournament	WD	withdrew from the tournament

NH / Not Held	means an event was not held.
NR / Non-Ranking Event	means an event is/was no longer a ranking event.
R / Ranking Event	means an event is/was a ranking event.
MR / Minor-Ranking Event	means an event is/was a minor-ranking event.

=== Amateur finals: 24 (15 titles) ===
Outcome	No.	Year	Championship	Opponent in the final	Score
Winner	1.	1999	Dutch Amateur Championship	(Netherlands) Johan Oenema	5–3
Winner	2.	2001	Dutch Amateur Championship (2)	(Netherlands) Johan Oenema	5–3
Winner	3.	2006	EBSA International Open	(Republic of Ireland) Douglas Hogan	4–2
Runner-up	1.	2009	EBSA International Open	(Malta) Tony Drago	4–5
Winner	4.	2010	Dutch Amateur Championship (3)	(Netherlands) Johan Oenema	5–2
Runner-up	2.	2010	EBSA European Snooker Championships	(Belgium) Luca Brecel	4–7
Winner	5.	2011	Dutch Amateur Championship (4)	(Netherlands) Maurice Le Duc	5–4
Winner	6.	2011	NSR - Event 2	(Netherlands) Rene van Rijsbergen	4–1
Winner	7.	2011	NSR - Event 3	(Netherlands) Gerrit bij de Leij	3–2
Runner-up	3.	2011	NSR - Event 4	(Netherlands) Mario Wehrmannj	2–3
Runner-up	4.	2012	Dutch Amateur Championship	(Netherlands) Gerrit bij de Leij	1–5
Runner-up	5.	2012	NSR - Event 4	(Netherlands) Mario Wehrmannj	0–4
Winner	8.	2012	NSR - Event 5	(Netherlands) Rene Dikstra	3–0
Winner	9.	2012	NSR - Event 6	(Netherlands) Rene van Rijsbergen	3–2
Runner-up	6.	2013	Dutch Amateur Championship	(Netherlands) Rene van Rijsbergen	4–5
Runner-up	7.	2014	NSR - Event 1	(Netherlands) Ton Berkhout	2–3
Winner	10.	2015	NSR - Event 2	(Netherlands) Joris Maas	3–1
Winner	11.	2015	NSR - Event 4	(Netherlands) Joris Maas	3–2
Runner-up	8.	2015	German Grand Prix - Event 5 (2014–2015)	(Germany) Robbie James	1–4
Winner	12.	2015	German Grand Prix - Event 3 (2015–2016)	(Germany) Robin Otto	3–0
Winner	13.	2015	ClickSite Grand Prix - Event 1	(Netherlands) Florian Moederscheim	3–0
Runner-up	9.	2015	German Grand Prix - Event 7 (2015–2016)	(Germany) Robbie James	2–3
Winner	14.	2016	German Grand Prix - Event 4 (2016–2017)	(Germany) Simon Lichtenberg	3–0
Winner	15.	2018	Dutch Amateur Championship (5)	(Netherlands) Joris Maas	5–4
