= Hasnain =

Hasnain is a masculine given name and surname of Arabic origin. Notable people with the name include:

== Given name ==
- Hasnain Akhtar, Pakistani snooker player
- Hasnain Gulamabbas Dewji (born 1957), Member of Parliament in the National Assembly of Tanzania
- Hasnain Kazim (born 1974), German journalist
- Hasnain Khan (born 1996), Pakistani cricketer

== Surname ==
- Belum Hasnain, Pakistani politician
- Constance J. Chang-Hasnain (born 1960), American electrical engineer, and John R. Whinnery Chair Professor at University of California, Berkeley
- Maisam Hasnain (born 1977), former Pakistani cricketer
- Mohammad Hasnain (born 2000), Pakistani cricketer
- Syed Ata Hasnain, Indian Army General officer
- Seyed E. Hasnain (born 1954), distinguished Professor of Biological Sciences at the Indian Institute of Technology, Delhi, India
- Syed Mahdi Hasnain, general in the Indian Army
- Golam Hasnayen (1929–2021), Bangladeshi lawyer and activist
