= 2016 ACBS Asian Under-21 Snooker Championship =

ACBS Asian Under-21 Snooker Championship
Tournament information
- Dates: 1–8 March 2016
- City: Colombo
- Country: Sri Lanka
- Organisation: ACBS
- Highest break: (India) Ishpreet Singh Chadha (130)

Final
- Champion: (China) Wang Yuchen
- Runner-up: (Thailand) Ratchayothin Yotharuck
- Score: 6–5

The 2016 ACBS Asian Under-21 Snooker Championship was an amateur snooker tournament that is taking place from 1 March to 8 March 2016 in Colombo, Sri Lanka. It is the 17th edition of the ACBS Asian Under-21 Snooker Championship and also doubles as a qualification event for the World Snooker Tour.

The tournament was won by the number 3 seed Wang Yuchen of China who defeated Thailand's Ratchayothin Yotharuck 6–5 in the final to win the championship, as a result Yuchen was given a two-year card on the professional World Snooker Tour for the 2016/2017 and 2017/2018 seasons.

== Results ==
Last 24; Best of 7 frames
17	(Thailand) Pongsak Chongjairak	4
16	(Iran) Siyavosh Mozayani	1
9	(Hong Kong) Yun Fung Tam	4
24	(Sri Lanka) Mohamed Shamil	2
21	(South Korea) Seeon Kim	1
12	(India) Asutosh Padhy	4
13	(Syria) Abdulkarim Maksoud	1
20	(Syria) Yazan Alhadad	4
19	(Pakistan) Abdul Raheem	4
14	(South Korea) Daegyu Lee	0
11	(Pakistan) Haris Tahir	4
22	(India) Nikhil Rakesh Saigal	2
23	(Sri Lanka) Mohomed Rikaz	3
10	(Hong Kong) Ming Wa Man	4
15	(India) Ishpreet Singh Chadha	4
18	(Iran) Seyed Abouzarian	0

Last 16; Best of 7 frames
1	(Thailand) Phuttakarn Kimsuk	1
17	(Thailand) Pongsak Chongjairak	4
9	(Hong Kong) Yun Fung Tam	4
8	(Sri Lanka) Mohamed Fazil	0
5	(China) Yuan Sijun	4
12	(India) Asutosh Padhy	1
20	(Syria) Yazan Alhadad	0
4	(Thailand) Ratchayothin Yotharuck	4
3	(China) Wang Yuchen	4
19	(Pakistan) Abdul Raheem	2
11	(Pakistan) Haris Tahir	4
6	(Hong Kong) Man Hoi Leong	2
7	(Hong Kong) Ka Wai Cheung	4
10	(Hong Kong) Ming Wa Man	2
15	(India) Ishpreet Singh Chadha	4
2	(Malaysia) Kok Leong Lim	0

Quarter-finals; Best of 9 frames
17	(Thailand) Pongsak Chongjairak	5
9	(Hong Kong) Yun Fung Tam	0
5	(China) Yuan Sijun	4
4	(Thailand) Ratchayothin Yotharuck	5
3	(China) Wang Yuchen	5
11	(Pakistan) Haris Tahir	0
7	(Hong Kong) Ka Wai Cheung	4
15	(India) Ishpreet Singh Chadha	5

Semi-finals; Best of 9 frames
17	(Thailand) Pongsak Chongjairak	2
4	(Thailand) Ratchayothin Yotharuck	5
3	(China) Wang Yuchen	5
15	(India) Ishpreet Singh Chadha	1

Final; Best of 11 frames
4	(Thailand) Ratchayothin Yotharuck	5
3	(China) Wang Yuchen	6
