= Snooker at the 2022 World Games – men's singles =

Competition at the 2022 World Games

Snooker men's singles at the 2022 World Games
- Venue: Birmingham Jefferson Convention Complex, Birmingham, United States
- Dates: 13–17 July 2022
- Competitors: 16 from 13 nations

Medalists
gold medal	(Hong Kong) Cheung Ka Wai
silver medal	(Egypt) Abdelrahman Shahin
bronze medal	(United Kingdom) Darren Morgan

The men's singles snooker competition at the 2022 World Games took place from 13 to 17 July 2022 at the Birmingham Jefferson Convention Complex in Birmingham, United States.

== Competition format ==
A total of 16 players entered the competition. They competed in knock-out system.

== Bracket ==
Round of 16
(Pakistan) Ahsan Ramzan	3
(United States) Ahmed Aly Elsayed	1
(Hong Kong) Cheung Ka Wai	3
(United Kingdom) Wayne Brown	0
(Germany) Umut Dikme	3
(Bahrain) Habib Subah	0
(Qatar) Ali Al-Obaidli	3
(Thailand) Taweesap Kongkitchertchoo	0
(Austria) Florian Nüßle	3
(United States) Renat Denkha	0
(Egypt) Abdelrahman Shahin	3
(Brazil) Victor Sarkis	0
(India) Pankaj Advani	1
(United Kingdom) Darren Morgan	3
(Poland) Antoni Kowalski	3
(Qatar) Ahmed Saif	0

Quarter-finals
(Pakistan) Ahsan Ramzan	1
(Hong Kong) Cheung Ka Wai	3
(Germany) Umut Dikme	1
(Qatar) Ali Al-Obaidli	3
(Austria) Florian Nüßle	1
(Egypt) Abdelrahman Shahin	3
(United Kingdom) Darren Morgan	3
(Poland) Antoni Kowalski	1

Semi-finals
(Hong Kong) Cheung Ka Wai	3
(Qatar) Ali Al-Obaidli	0
(Egypt) Abdelrahman Shahin	3
(United Kingdom) Darren Morgan	2

Final
(Hong Kong) Cheung Ka Wai	3
(Egypt) Abdelrahman Shahin	1
Third place
(Qatar) Ali Al-Obaidli	2
(United Kingdom) Darren Morgan	3

=== Final ===
Final: Best of 5 frames. Referee: Birmingham Jefferson Convention Complex, Birmingham, United States, 17 July 2022
Cheung Ka Wai; Hong Kong	3–1	Abdelrahman Shahin; Egypt
74–15 (68); 13–59; 69–18; 65–29
68	Highest break	<50
0	Century breaks	0
1	50+ breaks	0
