= 2013 World Open (snooker) =

Yearly Yuan-jiang Gujinggong Liquor Haikou World Open

Tournament information
- Dates: 25 February – 3 March 2013
- Venue: Hainan International Exhibition Center
- City: Haikou
- Country: China
- Organisation: World Snooker
- Format: Ranking event
- Total prize fund: £425,000
- Winner's share: £85,000
- Highest break: John Higgins (SCO) (141)

Final
- Champion: Mark Allen (NIR)
- Runner-up: Matthew Stevens (WAL)
- Score: 10–4

The 2013 Yearly Yuan-jiang Gujinggong Liquor Haikou World Open was a professional ranking snooker tournament that took place between 25 February–3 March 2013 at the Hainan International Exhibition Center in Haikou, China. It was the eighth ranking event of the 2012/2013 season.

Mark Allen defended the title he won in 2012, by defeating Matthew Stevens 10–4 in the final. This was Allen's second ranking title.

== Prize fund ==
The breakdown of prize money for this year is shown below:

- Winner: £85,000
- Runner-up: £35,000
- Semi-final: £20,000
- Quarter-final: £11,000
- Last 16: £7,500
- Last 32: £6,000
- Last 48: £2,300
- Last 64: £1,500
- Non-televised highest break: £700
- Televised highest break: £3,500
- Total: £425,000

== Wildcard round ==
These matches were played in Haikou on 25 and 26 February 2013.

Match		Score	
WC1	Andrew Higginson (ENG)	1–5	Zhao Xintong (CHN)
WC2	Alan McManus (SCO)	5–3	Lin Shuai (CHN)
WC3	Mark Joyce (ENG)	5–4	Noppon Saengkham (THA)
WC4	Nigel Bond (ENG)	5–3	Zhu Yinghui (CHN)
WC5	David Gilbert (ENG)	5–0	Lu Ning (CHN)
WC6	Jamie Cope (ENG)	5–4	Wang Yuchen (CHN)
WC7	Ian Burns (ENG)	5–1	Saleh Mohammad (AFG)
WC8	Simon Bedford (ENG)	2–5	Lyu Haotian (CHN)

== Main draw ==
Last 32; Best of 9 frames
1	(Northern Ireland) Mark Allen	5
(Wales) Ryan Day	2
15	(England) Mark Davis	3
(England) Robert Milkins	5
11	(England) Ricky Walden	5
(England) Peter Ebdon	2
7	(Scotland) Stephen Maguire	5
(Scotland) Marcus Campbell	3
8	(Wales) Mark Williams	2
(Hong Kong) Marco Fu	5
10	(China) Ding Junhui	5
(England) Michael Holt	4
9	(England) Stuart Bingham	5
(China) Zhao Xintong	2
4	(Scotland) John Higgins	5
(Scotland) Alan McManus	3
3	(England) Judd Trump	5
(England) Mark Joyce	0
14	(England) Ali Carter	w/d
(England) Nigel Bond	w/o
12	(Wales) Matthew Stevens	5
(England) David Gilbert	4
5	(England) Shaun Murphy	5
(England) Martin Gould	4
6	(Australia) Neil Robertson	5
(Wales) Dominic Dale	2
15	(Scotland) Graeme Dott	5
(England) Jamie Cope	2
16	(England) Barry Hawkins	5
(England) Ian Burns	1
2	(England) Mark Selby	5
(China) Lyu Haotian	0

Last 16; Best of 9 frames
1	(Northern Ireland) Mark Allen	5
(England) Robert Milkins	2
11	(England) Ricky Walden	5
7	(Scotland) Stephen Maguire	4
(Hong Kong) Marco Fu	2
10	(China) Ding Junhui	5
9	(England) Stuart Bingham	0
4	(Scotland) John Higgins	5
3	(England) Judd Trump	5
(England) Nigel Bond	1
12	(Wales) Matthew Stevens	5
5	(England) Shaun Murphy	3
6	(Australia) Neil Robertson	5
15	(Scotland) Graeme Dott	0
16	(England) Barry Hawkins	1
2	(England) Mark Selby	5

Quarter-finals; Best of 9 frames
1	(Northern Ireland) Mark Allen	5
11	(England) Ricky Walden	1
10	(China) Ding Junhui	0
4	(Scotland) John Higgins	5
3	(England) Judd Trump	3
12	(Wales) Matthew Stevens	5
6	(Australia) Neil Robertson	5
2	(England) Mark Selby	3

Semi-finals; Best of 11 frames
1	(Northern Ireland) Mark Allen	6
4	(Scotland) John Higgins	2
12	(Wales) Matthew Stevens	6
6	(Australia) Neil Robertson	5

Final; Best of 19 frames
1	(Northern Ireland) Mark Allen	10
12	(Wales) Matthew Stevens	4

== Final ==
Final: Best of 19 frames. Referee: Colin Humphries. Hainan International Exhibition Center, Haikou, China, 3 March 2013.
Mark Allen (1); Northern Ireland	10–4	Matthew Stevens (12); Wales
Afternoon: 74–44, 68–16 (52), 93–1 (93), 74–55 (58), 0–121 (67), 0–112 (112), 64–0, 112–0 (100), 5–51; Evening: 61–58, 0–100 (100), 74–7 (55), 66–47, 77–1 (68)
100	Highest break	112
1	Century breaks	2
6	50+ breaks	3

== Qualifying ==
These matches were held between 18 and 21 December 2012 at the World Snooker Academy in Sheffield, England.

Round 1 Best of 9 frames
(England) Michael Wasley	3
(Scotland) Michael Leslie	5
(India) Aditya Mehta	4
(Scotland) Scott Donaldson	5
(England) Liam Highfield	5
(Wales) Daniel Wells	2
(England) Robbie Williams	5
(England) David Grace	2
(China) Tian Pengfei	5
(Thailand) Passakorn Suwannawat	3
(China) Chen Zhe	5
(Wales) Gareth Allen	1
(China) Li Yan	1
(Wales) Duane Jones	5
(Norway) Kurt Maflin	3
(England) Martin O'Donnell	5
(England) Craig Steadman	4
(England) Justin Astley	5
(Thailand) Dechawat Poomjaeng	5
(Egypt) Mohamed Khairy	1
(England) Paul Davison	4
(England) Sean O'Sullivan	5
(Malta) Tony Drago	4
(England) Sam Baird	5
(Thailand) Thanawat Thirapongpaiboon	5
(England) Joel Walker	0
(China) Zhang Anda	5
(England) Michael Wild	3
(England) Ian Burns	w/o
(England) Jamie O'Neill	w/d
(India) Pankaj Advani	2
(England) Simon Bedford	5

Round 2 Best of 9 frames
(Thailand) Thepchaiya Un-Nooh	5
(Scotland) Michael Leslie	1
(Scotland) Anthony McGill	5
(Scotland) Scott Donaldson	3
(England) Barry Pinches	1
(England) Liam Highfield	5
(England) Andy Hicks	2
(England) Robbie Williams	5
(China) Liu Chuang	5
(China) Tian Pengfei	1
(England) Adam Duffy	1
(China) Chen Zhe	5
(England) Rod Lawler	5
(Wales) Duane Jones	3
(Scotland) Alan McManus	5
(England) Martin O'Donnell	1
(England) Mark Joyce	5
(England) Justin Astley	3
(England) Jimmy White	5
(Thailand) Dechawat Poomjaeng	4
(England) Alfie Burden	5
(England) Sean O'Sullivan	1
(England) Mike Dunn	5
(England) Sam Baird	3
(China) Cao Yupeng	5
(Thailand) Thanawat Thirapongpaiboon	3
(Belgium) Luca Brecel	4
(China) Zhang Anda	5
(Thailand) James Wattana	2
(England) Ian Burns	5
(England) Peter Lines	0
(England) Simon Bedford	5

Round 3 Best of 9 frames
(England) Anthony Hamilton	1
(Thailand) Thepchaiya Un-Nooh	5
(England) Jack Lisowski	5
(Scotland) Anthony McGill	3
(China) Liang Wenbo	4
(England) Liam Highfield	5
(Wales) Michael White	5
(England) Robbie Williams	0
(China) Xiao Guodong	4
(China) Liu Chuang	5
(England) Steve Davis	4
(China) Chen Zhe	5
(England) Matthew Selt	1
(England) Rod Lawler	5
(Wales) Jamie Jones	3
(Scotland) Alan McManus	5
(England) Jimmy Robertson	0
(England) Mark Joyce	5
(England) Nigel Bond	5
(England) Jimmy White	4
(England) David Gilbert	5
(England) Alfie Burden	1
(China) Yu Delu	5
(England) Mike Dunn	1
(England) Dave Harold	5
(China) Cao Yupeng	2
(England) Rory McLeod	2
(China) Zhang Anda	5
(England) Ben Woollaston	0
(England) Ian Burns	5
(Northern Ireland) Gerard Greene	4
(England) Simon Bedford	5

Round 4 Best of 9 frames
(Wales) Ryan Day	5
(Thailand) Thepchaiya Un-Nooh	0
(England) Robert Milkins	5
(England) Jack Lisowski	2
(England) Peter Ebdon	5
(England) Liam Highfield	4
(Scotland) Marcus Campbell	5
(Wales) Michael White	4
(Hong Kong) Marco Fu	5
(China) Liu Chuang	2
(England) Michael Holt	5
(China) Chen Zhe	3
(England) Andrew Higginson	5
(England) Rod Lawler	0
(England) Tom Ford	3
(Scotland) Alan McManus	5
(England) Joe Perry	2
(England) Mark Joyce	5
(Scotland) Jamie Burnett	3
(England) Nigel Bond	5
(England) Mark King	1
(England) David Gilbert	5
(England) Martin Gould	5
(China) Yu Delu	4
(Wales) Dominic Dale	5
(England) Dave Harold	4
(England) Jamie Cope	5
(China) Zhang Anda	4
(Republic of Ireland) Fergal O'Brien	4
(England) Ian Burns	5
(Republic of Ireland) Ken Doherty	4
(England) Simon Bedford	5

== Century breaks ==
=== Qualifying stage centuries ===
- 134, 103 – Andrew Higginson
- 134 – Sean O'Sullivan
- 133, 116 – Thepchaiya Un-Nooh
- 131 – Zhang Anda
- 123 – Scott Donaldson
- 122 – Xiao Guodong
- 122 – Marco Fu
- 121, 100 – Kurt Maflin
- 120 – Thanawat Thirapongpaiboon
- 118, 101 – Michael White
- 115 – Li Yan
- 111 – Jamie Cope
- 110 – Alan McManus
- 101 – Robert Milkins
- 100 – Chen Zhe

=== Televised stage centuries ===
- 141, 113, 105 – John Higgins
- 139 – Graeme Dott
- 127 – Ding Junhui
- 126 – Stuart Bingham
- 125, 104 – Ricky Walden
- 119, 100 – Mark Allen
- 118, 110 – Shaun Murphy
- 112, 100 – Matthew Stevens
- 112 – Barry Hawkins
- 111, 104, 102 – Judd Trump
- 107, 107 – Neil Robertson
- 100 – Mark Davis
