= Hasnain Akhtar =

Sport
- Country: Pakistan
- Sport: Snooker

Hasnain Akhtar (Urdu: حسنین اختر) is a snooker player from Pakistan.

In 2024, he won the ACBS Asian Under-21 Snooker Championship held in Riyadh. In 2025, he was the winner of the IBSF World U17 Championship in Bahrain.

== Career ==
In July 2024, Akhtar won the Asian Under-21 Snooker Championship in Riyadh by beating fellow Pakistani player Ahsan Ramzan 4–3.

In July 2025, he won the IBSF World Under-17 Championship at the Crowne Plaza in Bahrain. He beat Riley Powell from Wales 4–0 in the final to clinch the title.

In November 2025, he participated in the IBSF World Snooker Championship 2025 along with three-time winner Muhammad Asif and three other players. In February 2026, he participated in the Asian Under-21 Snooker Championship along with Asif, Rana Irfan Mahmood, and Ahsan Ramzan.

== See also ==
- Pakistani snooker players
- Sport in Pakistan
