= Li Xinggang =

Chinese architect

Li Xinggang 李兴钢
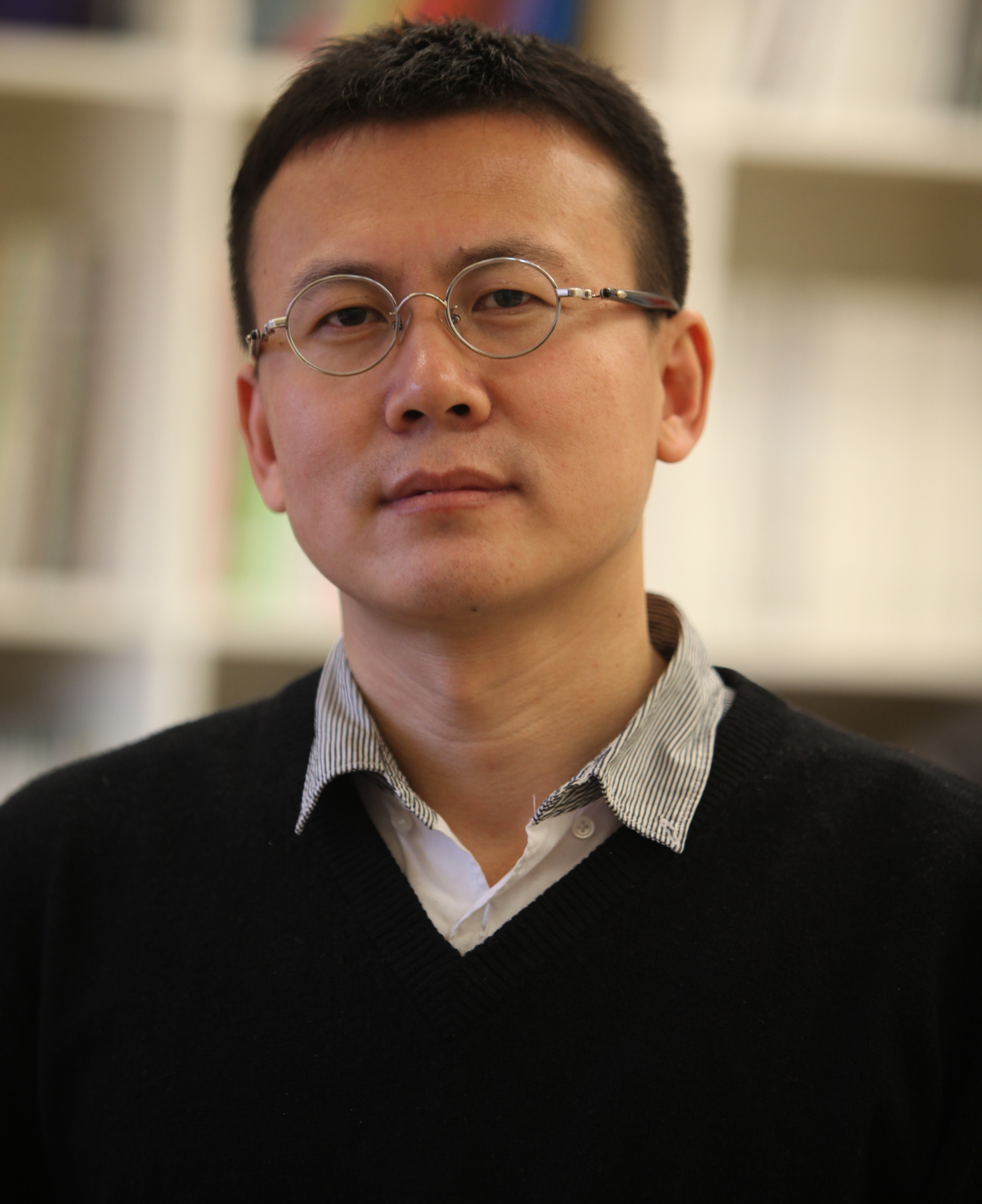
- Born: 1969 (age 56–57); Laoting County, Hebei Province, China
- Education: Department of Architecture at Tianjin University
- Occupation: Architect
- Awards: Liang Sicheng Architecture Prize(2020), Joint Gold award of IOC/IAKS Award, Gold/Silver Prize of China National Outstanding Architecture Awards (2009/2010/2000), World Youth Chinese Architects Awards (2007), and Finalist of World Architecture Awards of UK (2002)
- Practice: Atelier Li Xinggang, China Architecture Design & Research Group
- Projects: Yanqing venue for the 2022 Beijing Winter Olympics, Beijing Olympic Stadium, Local Studio together with Herzog & De Meuron, Museum for Site of Xanadu, Jixi Museum, Gymnasium of the New Campus of Tianjin University, Hainan International Convention And Exhibition Center

Li Xinggang
- Simplified Chinese: 李兴钢
- Traditional Chinese: 李興鋼
Transcriptions
Standard Mandarin
- Hanyu Pinyin: Lǐ Xīnggāng

Li Xinggang (born 1969) is a Chinese architect and the founding principal of Atelier Li Xinggang since 2003. He is the chief architect of the China Architecture Design & Research Group. He was honored with the Liang Sicheng Architecture Prize (2020), regarded as China's highest architectural accolade for individual achievement. In 2023, he was elected as a member of the Chinese Academy of Engineering.

Li is renowned for his design of the Yanqing venue for the 2022 Beijing Winter Olympics and his role as the lead Chinese architect in collaboration with Herzog & de Meuron on the 2008 Beijing Olympic Stadium. His works have garnered numerous accolades, including the RIBA Lubetkin Prize and the IOC/IAKS Architecture Prizes (Joint Gold Award). He was also honored with the Liang Sicheng Architecture Prize. His works have also been exhibited at the Venice Architecture Biennale, and he has also held solo exhibitions at RIBA, the University of Cambridge, Aedes, and Palau Victòria Eugènia.

== Early life and career ==
Li Xinggang (Chinese: 李兴钢) received his bachelor's degree in architecture from Tianjin University in 1991 and joined the Architectural Design Institute of the Ministry of Construction of China (now China Architecture Design & Research Group). In 1998, he completed a training program at the Research Bureau of Railway Stations, French National Railways and was selected for the French Presidential Project "50 Chinese Architects in France". In 2001, he became the deputy chief architect of China Architecture Design & Research Group (CADG), and in 2003, he founded Atelier Li Xinggang of CADG.

From 2003 to 2007, Li Xinggang worked with Herzog & de Meuron as the lead Chinese architect for the Bird's Nest National Stadium, the main venue of the Beijing 2008 Olympic Games. In 2008, he was invited to participate in the 11th Venice International Architecture Biennale and designed the Paper-brick House. In 2011, he became the chief architect of China Architecture Design & Research Group (CADG). In 2012, he received his PhD in engineering from Tianjin University, and published his first portfolio of design works, Contemporary Architect Series: Li Xinggang.

In 2013, Li Xinggang held the "Sheng Jing Ji He" exhibition in Beijing, and in 2014, he published the UED album LI XINGGANG 2004-l–2013 Geometry and Sheng Jing. He was elected the National Engineering Survey and Design Master in 2016. From 2017 to 2022, he served as the chief planner and chief architect of the Yanqing Competition Area and venues of the Beijing 2022 Olympic and Paralympic Winter Games. In 2020, he published Wandering, Walking, Viewing, Living, Essays on Integrated Geometry and Poetic Scenery, and Li Xinggang 2001-2020, and held the exhibition "Integrated Geometry and Poetic Scenery: the working place of a Chinese contemporary architect" in Beijing. In October 2022, he was awarded the 10th Liang Sicheng Architecture Award. In 2023, he published a monograph, Outline of Engineering-Integrated Architecture. On November 22, 2023, he was elected as an academician of the Chinese Academy of Engineering.

After 2023, Li Xinggang gradually summarized his previous thoughts and concerns about ecological, technological, and cultural environments, and gradually formed the direction and characteristics of "vital architecture", which emphasizes the interaction between architecture and diverse environments, as well as the creation of poetics.

== Approach and focus ==
Li Xinggang advocates a research-driven design approach, rooted in contemporary Chinese realities and emphasizes the integration of architecture with the landscape and the interaction between artificial and natural elements. He proposes the design concept of "integrated geometry and poetic scenery" (shengjing jihe).

He emphasized the guiding role of engineering technology in the architectural creation of masterpieces and adopted engineering architecture as his design methodology. He further developed this philosophy through the concept of "vital architecture," which highlights the interaction between architecture and the environment, as well as the balance between technology and poetics.

== Major works ==
=== Wenchuan Earthquake Memorial, 2010 ===
Located in a cluster of museums in Sichuan, Southwest China, this project is a composite vessel that reflects the past and commemorates the Wenchuan earthquake. An intriguing itinerary through several courtyards connects a series of duplex galleries, reflecting the architect's interest in traditional courtyard spaces and ways of experiencing gardens.

=== Jixi Museum, 2013 ===
A medium-sized museum located in the ancient town of Anhui, Southern China. The continuous undulating pitched roof echoes the surrounding mountains and resembles the prototype roof of the ancient town. The treatment of courtyards avoids the existing trees on the site, giving the circulation of the exhibition a more traditional Chinese sense.

=== The "Third Space" in Tangshan, 2015 ===
This is an assemblage of twin towers comprising 76 garden houses with multi-level interiors stacked vertically atop a public commercial space. The myriad of shelters cantilevered on the elevation are a critique of the monotonous rebuilt city of Tangshan in the post-disaster period, framing the city as a landscape.

=== Gymnasium of the New Campus of Tianjin University, 2015 ===
It is a comprehensive venue that combines multiple sports spaces and a variety of new buildings in the vicinity, forming the new campus of Tianjin University. In contrast to the image of the neighborhood, the building creates a clustered order through a unique fair-faced concrete roof structure aligned with various movement spaces.

=== Museum for the Site of Xanadu, 2015 ===
This small museum is located on a gentle hill in Inner Mongolia, China. Most of the volumes are delicately hidden within the existing mining pits, with various functional circulations organized in multiple levels. A small segment of the exposed cylindrical volume indicates the distant ruins of the Xanadu and contrasts with the desolate prairie through the red fair-faced concrete. The "Third Space" in Tangshan.

=== Instantaneous Arcadia, 2015 ===
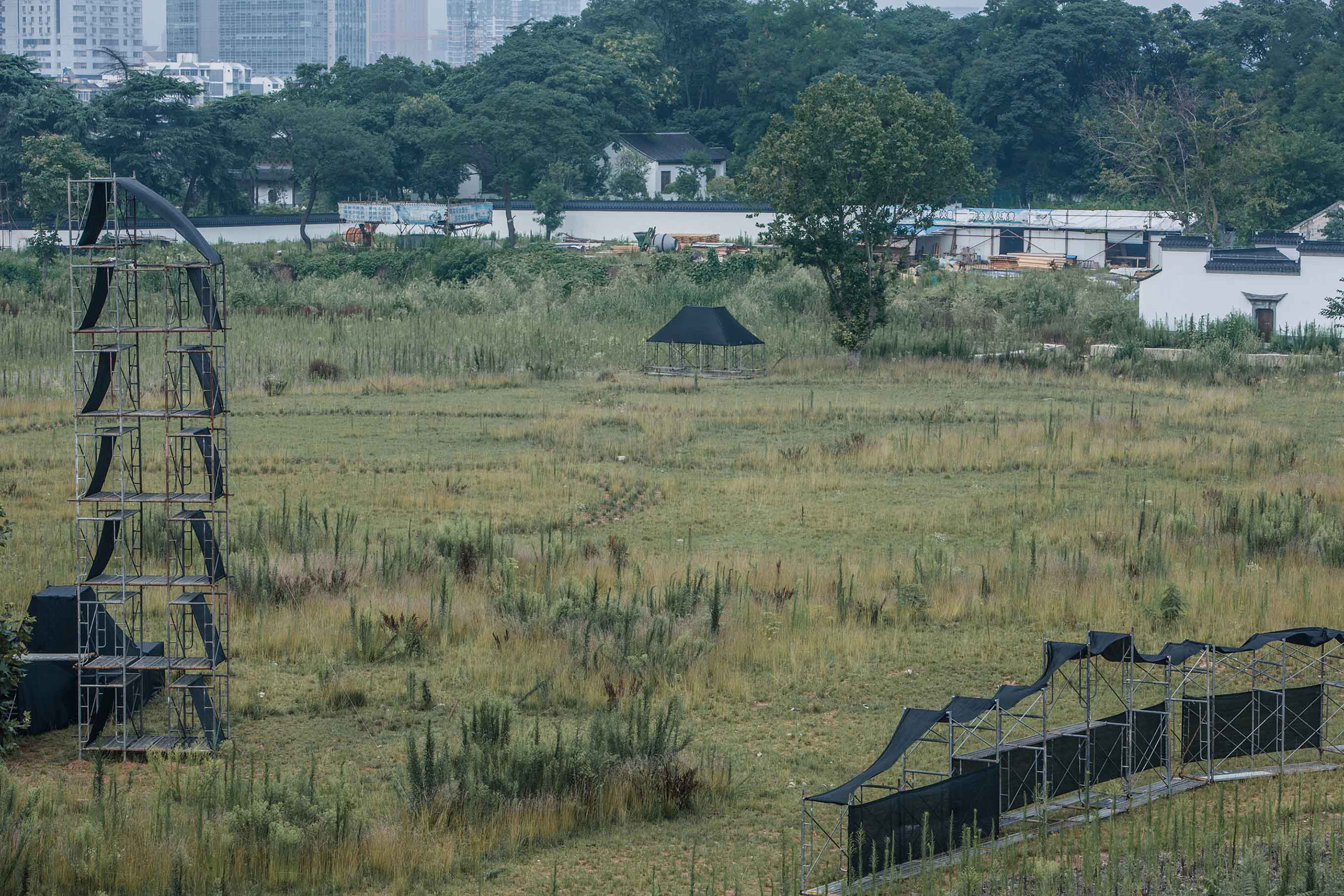

This is a set of temporary installations on a wasteland with sophisticated context located at the corner of Nanjing's ancient city wall. The flexible combination of modular scaffolding and convenient shading fabric creates four traditional Chinese space prototypes - pavilion, kiosk, pagoda, and corridor - which collectively depict the various elements of the site to create a nostalgic atmosphere. It took only four hours to set up and only a few hours to dismantle after the three-week lifespan.

=== "Miniature Beijing", Renovation of No. 28 Dayuan Hutong, 2017 ===
This is a renovation project in a dense hutong area of Beijing. Taking reference from the traditional city structure of Beijing, this spatial prototype was adopted to gradually extend from the street into each room. The original bland layout of two courtyards with three rows of houses has been transformed into five courtyard houses of different sizes plus a communal dining bar with a rooftop pavilion.

=== "Silo Pavilion", Holiday Inn Express Beijing Shougang, 2018 ===
This is a renovation project located in the West Beijing Industrial Heritage Park, where the existing infrastructure and mining silos were transformed into a Holiday Inn through structural reinforcement and modest expansion. The new construction is superimposed on the preserved section and contrasts dramatically with the original closed walls of the lower barn station with a light, horizontal gesture. Industrial amenities such as the hopper inside the mine silo have also been incorporated into the signature bar and all-day dining restaurant.

=== Yanqing National Sliding Centre for the Beijing 2022 Olympic Winter Games, 2022 ===
It is a venue designed to complement the snowmobile bobsleigh program for the Beijing 2022 Winter Olympics, with the building coiled around a complex south-facing hillside. Using a range of advanced BIM and digital intelligence technologies, the design integrates the building's form and spatial layout with the complex terrain and advanced track. It also addresses shading on the south-facing slope through a geo-environmental design technique. The venue also provides the public with a three-dimensional viewing and touring trail that is interwoven with the track.

=== Beijing 2022 Olympic & Paralympic Winter Games Yanqing Area / Yanqing National Alpine Skiing Centre, 2022 ===
As one of the three main competition zones for the Beijing 2022 Winter Olympics and Paralympics, it hosted two major events—Alpine Skiing and Bobsleigh. The design and construction of the Yanqing Competition Zone were guided by the concept of "mountain forest venues and an ecological Winter Olympics". Utilizing digital design and construction based on an environmental information model, along with "BIM+" collaborative technology for multi-scenario adaptation, the project achieved minimally invasive and reversible alpine venues, earth-sheltered facilities with near-zero carbon consumption, and the assessment, transplantation, and protection of native trees in mountainous areas. Additionally, ecological conservation and restoration efforts were implemented across an altitude drop of over 1,000 meters.

=== "Chongtai", Taizicheng Exhibition Center of Chongli, 2022 ===
This renovation project is located in the Zhangjiakou Competition Area for the Beijing 2022 Winter Olympics. The design transforms a cramped, vertically oriented existing building, which stands prominently in the mountainous terrain, into an introverted exhibition space. A public viewing area is added through horizontally cantilevered extensions on the exterior. Made of white fair-faced concrete and offering panoramic views of the surrounding mountains, the horizontal space ultimately directs visitors' attention toward the ruins of Taizicheng historical site.

== Bibliography ==
- Outline of Engineering-Integrated Architecture (2023) ISBN 978-7-112-27996-8
- Essays on Integrated Geometry and Poetic Scenery (2020) ISBN 978-7-5514-2774-6
- Li Xinggang 2001-2020 (2020) ISBN 978-7-5514-3028-9
- Wandering, Walking, Viewing, Living]\ (2020) ISBN 978-7-5514-2765-4
- Tranquility and Noise (Bustle) (2015) ISBN 978-7-112-18303-6
- LI XINGGANG 2004-2013 Geometry and Sheng Jing(2014). URBAN ENVIRONMENT DESIGN. ISBN 978-1-908758-13-2
- LI XINGGANG (2012)(as Atelier Li Xinggang). Beijing: China Architecture & Building Press. ISBN 978-7-112-14304-7
- Design papers - Pursuing a dream to build the Bird's Nest - National Stadium(Chinese Edition) (2009)(as CADG). Beijing: China Architecture & Building Press. ISBN 978-7-112-12482-4

== Exhibitions ==
- 2026 "VITAL ARCHITECTURE: ATELIER LIXINGGANG", Barcelona, Spain
- 2026 "VITAL ARCHITECTURE: ATELIER LIXINGGANG", Berlin, Germany
- 2025 "ATELIER LIXINGGANG: Integrated Geometryand Poetic Scenery", London, UK
- 2025 "Yanqing Olympic Park 2062: TheInteraction between Technology andPoetry", Cambridge, UK
- 2023 "An Architectural Dialogue: China and Brazil", Shanghai, China
- 2022 The 18th Venice Biennale of Architecture, Venice, Italy
- 2021 SZ-HK Urbanism/Architecture Bi-City Biennale, Shenzhen/Hong Kong, China
- 2020 The 17th Venice Biennale of Architecture, Venice, Italy
- 2020 Sheng Jing Ji He, Beijing, China
- 2017 SZ-HK Urbanism/Architecture Bi-City Biennale, Shenzhen/Hong Kong, China
- 2016 Harvard GSD Chinese Contemporary Architecture Exhibition, Massachusetts, USA
- 2015 Archi-Neering Design Exhibition, Beijing, China
- 2013 "Sheng Jing Ji He", Beijing, China
- 2008 "Illusion Into Reality: Chinese Gardens for Living", Dresden, Germany
- 2008 The 11th Venice Biennale of Architecture, Venice, Italy
- 2008 "Status", Eight Young Chinese Architects, Beijing, China
- 2007 SZ-HK Urbanism/Architecture Bi-City Biennale, Shenzhen/Hong Kong, China
- 2005 The 1st Shenzhen Urbanism/Architecture Biennale, Shenzhen, China

== Awards and honors ==
- 2023 Academician of the Chinese Academy of Engineering
- 2022 Liang Sicheng Architecture Prize
- 2022 First Prize of China Award for Science and Technology in Construction
- 2022 Torchbearer for Beijing 2022 Winter Olympics
- 2019 ARCASIA Awards for Architecture
- 2016 National Engineering Survey and Design Master
- 2009 Gold Award of National Outstanding Engineering Design Awards
- 2009 Joint Gold award of IOC/IAKS Award
- 2008 Torchbearer for Beijing 2008 Olympics
- 2007 China Youth Science and Technology Award
- 2007 Global Young Chinese Architects Award
- 2004 The 5th Young Architects Award by Architectural Society of China
- 2004 Asian Architecture Development Award
