= Wang Yuchen (snooker player) =

Chinese snooker player (born 1997)

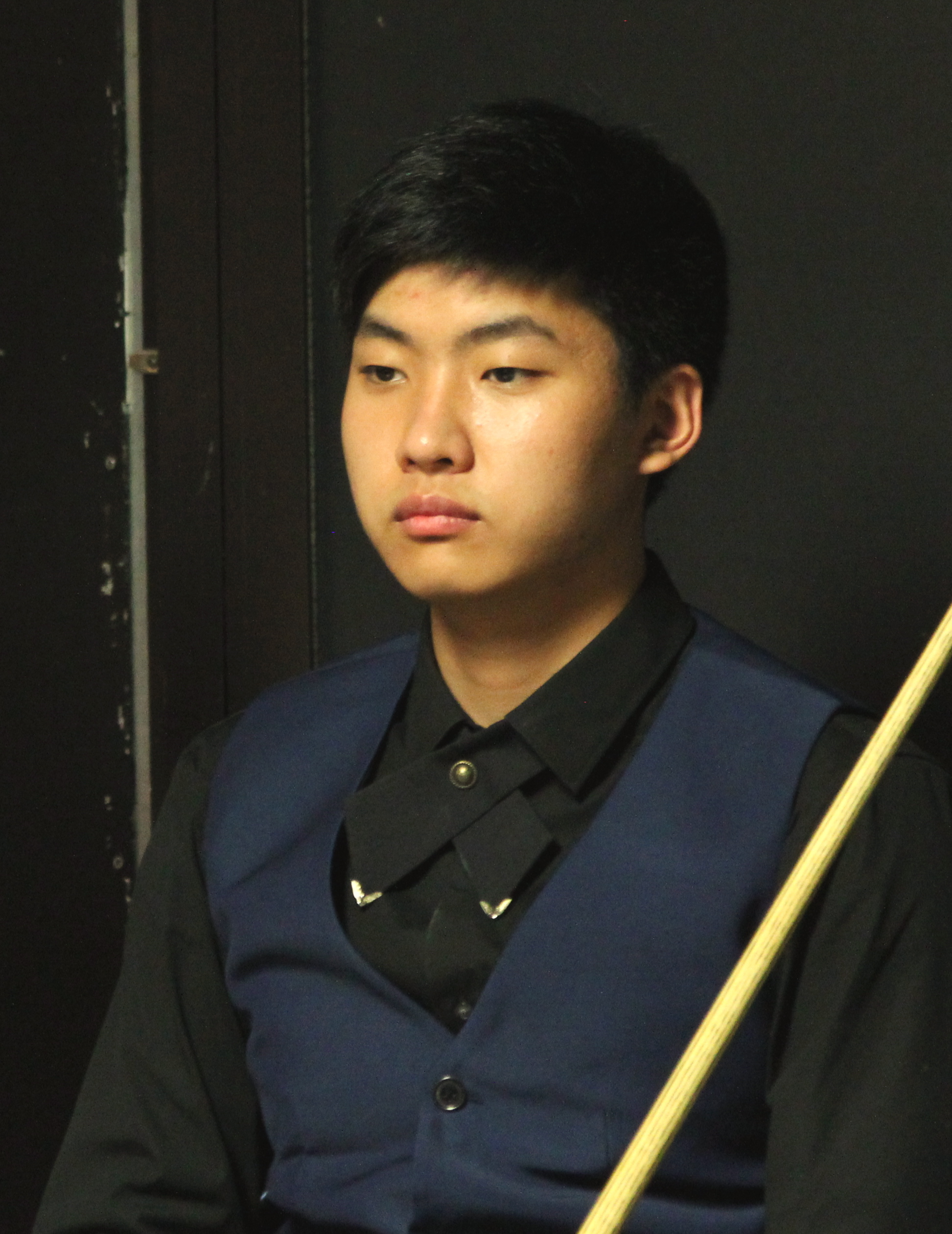
- Paul Hunter Classic 2017

Personal information
- Born: August 5, 1997 (age 29) Qingdao, Shandong, China

Sport
- Country: Hong Kong (from 2019); China (to 2018)
- Sport: Snooker
- Professional: 2016–2018, 2024–present
- Highest ranking: 69 (December 2025)
- Best ranking finish: Last 32 (x2)

Wang Yuchen (Chinese: 王雨晨; born 5 August 1997) is a Hong Kong (previously Chinese) professional snooker player. Wang was born in Qingdao, Shandong Province and lived in Kaifeng, Henan Province.

== Career ==
Wang Yuchen first drew international attention in September 2013 at the 2013 Shanghai Masters when competing as a wildcard he defeated Joe Perry to reach the last 32 of the tournament where he eventually lost to 3–5 Neil Robertson.

In March 2016, Wang won the Asian Under-21 Snooker Championship, beating former professional Ratchayothin Yotharuck of Thailand 6–5 in the final. This win earned him a two-year professional card for the 2016–17 and 2017–18 seasons. He secured a 6–5 victory over 2002 world champion Peter Ebdon in the opening round of the 2016 UK Championship, before losing 6–5 to Liam Highfield after having led 4–1. Wang also won a match at the Welsh Open by edging past Gareth Allen 4–3, but lost 4–2 to Stuart Carrington in the second round.

Wang previously represented China, but moved to Hong Kong in 2019.

== Performance and rankings timeline ==
Tournament	2012/ 13	2013/ 14	2014/ 15	2015/ 16	2016/ 17	2017/ 18	2018/ 19	2024/ 25	2025/ 26
Ranking (Note: It shows the ranking at the beginning of the season)	(Note: He was an amateur)				(Note: New players on the Main Tour don't have a ranking)	81			73
Ranking tournaments
Championship League	Non-Ranking Event							A	RR
Saudi Arabia Masters	Tournament Not Held							1R	3R
Wuhan Open	Tournament Not Held							LQ	1R
English Open	Tournament Not Held				1R	1R	A	LQ	LQ
British Open	Tournament Not Held							LQ	LQ
Xi'an Grand Prix	Tournament Not Held							LQ	1R
Northern Ireland Open	Tournament Not Held				1R	2R	A	2R	LQ
International Championship	WR	A	A	WR	WR	LQ	A	LQ	1R
UK Championship	A	A	A	A	2R	1R	A	LQ	LQ
Shoot Out	Non-Ranking Event				1R	1R	A	1R	1R
Scottish Open	MR	Not Held			1R	1R	A	LQ	2R
German Masters	A	A	A	A	LQ	LQ	A	LQ	LQ
World Grand Prix	Not Held		NR	DNQ	DNQ	DNQ	DNQ	DNQ	DNQ
Players Championship (Note: The event was called the Players Tour Championship Grand Final (2012/2013–2015/2016))	DNQ	DNQ	DNQ	DNQ	DNQ	DNQ	DNQ	DNQ	DNQ
Welsh Open	A	A	A	A	2R	1R	A	1R	LQ
World Open	WR	A	Not Held		1R	LQ	A	LQ	LQ
Tour Championship	Tournament Not Held						DNQ	DNQ	DNQ
World Championship	A	A	A	A	LQ	LQ	A	LQ	LQ
Former ranking tournaments
Shanghai Masters	WR	1R	A	WR	LQ	1R	Non-Ranking		
Riga Masters (Note: The event was called the Riga Open (2014/2015–2015/2016))	Not Held		Minor-Ranking		LQ	WD	A	Not Held	
Paul Hunter Classic	Minor-Ranking Event				A	1R	A	Not Held	
China Championship	Tournament Not Held				NR	LQ	A	Not Held	
European Masters	Tournament Not Held				LQ	LQ	A	Not Held	
Indian Open	NH	A	A	NH	LQ	1R	A	Not Held	
Gibraltar Open	Not Held			MR	1R	A	A	Not Held	
China Open	WR	A	A	WR	LQ	LQ	A	Not Held	
Former non-ranking tournaments
Haining Open	Not Held		Minor-Rank		3R	3R	4R	Not Held	

Performance Table Legend
LQ	lost in the qualifying draw	#R	lost in the early rounds of the tournament (WR = Wildcard round, RR = Round robin)	QF	lost in the quarter-finals
SF	lost in the semi-finals	F	lost in the final	W	won the tournament
DNQ	did not qualify for the tournament	A	did not participate in the tournament	WD	withdrew from the tournament

NH / Not Held	means an event was not held
NR / Non-Ranking Event	means an event is/was no longer a ranking event
R / Ranking Event	means an event is/was a ranking event
MR / Minor-Ranking Event	means an event is/was a minor-ranking event
PA / Pro-am Event	means an event is/was a pro-am event

== Career finals ==
=== Amateur finals: 1 (1 title) ===
Outcome	No.	Year	Championship	Opponent in the final	Score
Winner	1.	2016	Asian Under-21 Championship	(Thailand) Ratchayothin Yotharuck	6–5
