= 2013 Indian Open =

Indian Open
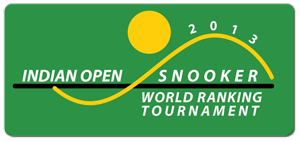

Tournament information
- Dates: 14–18 October 2013
- Venue: Le Meridien Hotel
- City: New Delhi
- Country: India
- Organisation: World Snooker
- Format: Ranking event
- Total prize fund: £300,000
- Winner's share: £50,000
- Highest break: Ding Junhui (CHN) (142)

Final
- Champion: Ding Junhui (CHN)
- Runner-up: Aditya Mehta (IND)
- Score: 5–0

The 2013 Indian Open was a professional ranking snooker tournament held between 14 and 18 October 2013, at the Le Meridien Hotel in New Delhi, India. It was the first ranking event held in India, and the fourth ranking event of the 2013/2014 season.

Ding Junhui won his eighth ranking title by defeating Aditya Mehta 5–0 in the final. Ding became the first player to win two consecutive ranking titles in the same season since Ronnie O'Sullivan in 2002/2003, who won the 2003 European Open and the 2003 Irish Masters. At the tournament Mehta became the first Indian player to reach the final of a ranking event.

== Prize fund ==
The breakdown of prize money for this year is shown below:

- Winner: £50,000
- Runner-up: £25,000
- Semi-final: £13,500
- Quarter-final: £9,000
- Last 16: £6,000
- Last 32: £3,000
- Last 64: £2,000

- Televised highest break: £2,000
- Total: £300,000

== Wildcard round ==
These matches were played in New Delhi on 14 October 2013. The Indian wildcard players were selected through a qualifying tournament.

Match		Score	
WC1	Rod Lawler (ENG)	4–1	Kamal Chawla (IND)
WC2	Jeff Cundy (ENG)	4–0	Sundeep Gulati (IND)
WC3	Anthony McGill (SCO)	4–3	Shivam Arora (IND)
WC4	Robbie Williams (ENG)	4–1	Manan Chandra (IND)
WC5	Paul Davison (ENG)	4–1	Faisal Khan (IND)
WC6	Liam Highfield (ENG)	w/d–w/o	Dharminder Lilly (IND)

== Main draw ==
=== Top half ===
Last 64; Best of 7 frames
(Australia) Neil Robertson	4
(Thailand) Noppon Saengkham	1
(England) Rod Lawler	w/o
(England) Ali Carter	w/d
(Wales) Ryan Day	2
(Thailand) Dechawat Poomjaeng	4
(China) Liang Wenbo	4
(Republic of Ireland) David Morris	2
(China) Ding Junhui	4
(England) Barry Pinches	3
(England) Mark Joyce	4
(England) Sean O'Sullivan	0
(England) Jeff Cundy	3
(China) Li Yan	4
(England) Joel Walker	0
(Scotland) John Higgins	4
(England) Barry Hawkins	1
(Scotland) Anthony McGill	4
(England) Alex Davies	1
(Republic of Ireland) Fergal O'Brien	4
(England) Joe Perry	w/o
(England) David Gilbert	w/d
(Northern Ireland) Gerard Greene	0
(England) Ricky Walden	4
(Thailand) Ratchayothin Yotharuck	4
(Thailand) James Wattana	3
(England) Mike Dunn	4
(Republic of Ireland) Ken Doherty	2
(England) Andrew Higginson	4
(Scotland) Jamie Burnett	2
(England) Kyren Wilson	w/d
(England) Robbie Williams	w/o

Last 32; Best of 7 frames
(Australia) Neil Robertson	4
(England) Rod Lawler	2
(Thailand) Dechawat Poomjaeng	2
(China) Liang Wenbo	4
(China) Ding Junhui	4
(England) Mark Joyce	3
(China) Li Yan	0
(Scotland) John Higgins	4
(Scotland) Anthony McGill	4
(Republic of Ireland) Fergal O'Brien	1
(England) Joe Perry	4
(England) Ricky Walden	2
(Thailand) Ratchayothin Yotharuck	0
(England) Mike Dunn	4
(England) Andrew Higginson	1
(England) Robbie Williams	4

Last 16; Best of 7 frames
(Australia) Neil Robertson	4
(China) Liang Wenbo	2
(China) Ding Junhui	4
(Scotland) John Higgins	2
(Scotland) Anthony McGill	4
(England) Joe Perry	2
(England) Mike Dunn	0
(England) Robbie Williams	4

Quarter-finals; Best of 7 frames
(Australia) Neil Robertson	2
(China) Ding Junhui	4
(Scotland) Anthony McGill	0
(England) Robbie Williams	4

Semi-finals; Best of 7 frames
(China) Ding Junhui	4
(England) Robbie Williams	1

=== Bottom half ===
Last 64; Best of 7 frames
(China) Zhang Anda	4
(Scotland) Alan McManus	1
(England) Anthony Hamilton	w/d
(Wales) Michael White	w/o
(Wales) Dominic Dale	0
(England) Gary Wilson	4
(Malta) Tony Drago	w/d
(Hong Kong) Marco Fu	w/o
(England) Mark Davis	4
(England) Elliot Slessor	2
(England) Jamie Cope	1
(England) Michael Holt	4
(England) Tom Ford	4
(Wales) Jamie Jones	3
(England) Paul Davison	1
(Scotland) Stephen Maguire	4
(England) Stuart Bingham	4
(China) Liu Chuang	1
(Thailand) Thanawat Thirapongpaiboon	4
(China) Lyu Haotian	1
(Scotland) Marcus Campbell	1
(India) Pankaj Advani	4
(England) Nigel Bond	1
(Northern Ireland) Mark Allen	4
(China) Chen Zhe	3
(England) Hammad Miah	4
(India) Aditya Mehta	4
(England) Peter Ebdon	3
(Wales) Mark Williams	w/o
(China) Yu Delu	w/d
(India) Dharminder Lilly	0
(England) Mark Selby	4

Last 32; Best of 7 frames
(China) Zhang Anda	3
(Wales) Michael White	4
(England) Gary Wilson	4
(Hong Kong) Marco Fu	3
(England) Mark Davis	4
(England) Michael Holt	1
(England) Tom Ford	3
(Scotland) Stephen Maguire	4
(England) Stuart Bingham	4
(Thailand) Thanawat Thirapongpaiboon	2
(India) Pankaj Advani	4
(Northern Ireland) Mark Allen	2
(England) Hammad Miah	1
(India) Aditya Mehta	4
(Wales) Mark Williams	4
(England) Mark Selby	1

Last 16; Best of 7 frames
(Wales) Michael White	4
(England) Gary Wilson	3
(England) Mark Davis	2
(Scotland) Stephen Maguire	4
(England) Stuart Bingham	3
(India) Pankaj Advani	4
(India) Aditya Mehta	4
(Wales) Mark Williams	2

Quarter-finals; Best of 7 frames
(Wales) Michael White	3
(Scotland) Stephen Maguire	4
(India) Pankaj Advani	3
(India) Aditya Mehta	4

Semi-finals; Best of 7 frames
(Scotland) Stephen Maguire	3
(India) Aditya Mehta	4

== Final ==
Final: Best of 9 frames. Referee: Brendan Moore. Le Meridien Hotel, New Delhi, India, 18 October 2013.
Ding Junhui; China	5–0	Aditya Mehta; India
76–36 (52), 87–0 (81), 107–0 (107), 93–1 (93), 116–1 (100)
107	Highest break	30
2	Century breaks	0
5	50+ breaks	0

== Qualifying ==
These matches were held on 11 and 12 August 2013 at the Doncaster Dome in Doncaster, England. All matches were best of 7 frames.

(Australia) Neil Robertson	4–3	(Finland) Robin Hull
(England) Adam Duffy	0–4	(Thailand) Noppon Saengkham
(England) Rod Lawler	4–0	(Wales) Jak Jones
(England) Ali Carter	4–0	(England) Gareth Green
(Wales) Ryan Day	4–0	(England) Christopher Keogan
(Thailand) Dechawat Poomjaeng	4–1	(Scotland) Rhys Clark
(China) Liang Wenbo	4–0	(Scotland) Scott Donaldson
(Wales) Matthew Stevens	0–4	(Republic of Ireland) David Morris
(China) Ding Junhui	4–1	(England) Sanderson Lam
(England) Barry Pinches	4–1	(England) Chris Wakelin
(England) Mark Joyce	4–3	(England) Allan Taylor
(England) Martin Gould	3–4	(England) Sean O'Sullivan
(England) Mark King	0–4	(England) Jeff Cundy
(England) Peter Lines	2–4	(China) Li Yan
(China) Tian Pengfei	2–4	(England) Joel Walker
(Scotland) John Higgins	4–2	(England) Sam Baird
(England) Barry Hawkins	4–2	(England) Jamie O'Neill
(Scotland) Anthony McGill	4–1	(England) James Cahill
(England) Dave Harold	2–4	(England) Alex Davies
(Republic of Ireland) Fergal O'Brien	4–0	(Australia) Vinnie Calabrese
(England) Joe Perry	4–1	(Thailand) Passakorn Suwannawat
(England) David Gilbert	4–0	(England) Zak Surety
(Northern Ireland) Gerard Greene	4–3	(England) Mitchell Travis
(England) Ricky Walden	4–1	(Malta) Alex Borg
(Scotland) Graeme Dott	2–4	(Thailand) Ratchayothin Yotharuck
(Thailand) James Wattana	4–1	(England) Ryan Clark
(England) Mike Dunn	4–0	(Thailand) Thepchaiya Un-Nooh
(Republic of Ireland) Ken Doherty	4–2	(Belgium) Luca Brecel
(England) Andrew Higginson	4–0	(Scotland) Ross Muir
(Scotland) Jamie Burnett	4–2	(England) Chris Norbury
(England) Rory McLeod	0–4	(England) Kyren Wilson
(England) Shaun Murphy	3–4	(England) Robbie Williams

(England) Judd Trump	3–4	(China) Zhang Anda
(Scotland) Alan McManus	4–1	(England) Sydney Wilson
(England) Anthony Hamilton	4–2	(England) Michael Wasley
(Wales) Michael White	4–0	(Qatar) Ahmed Saif
(Wales) Dominic Dale	4–2	(Switzerland) Alexander Ursenbacher
(England) Jimmy White	1–4	(England) Gary Wilson
(England) Alfie Burden	3–4	(Malta) Tony Drago
(Hong Kong) Marco Fu	4–0	(Scotland) Michael Leslie
(England) Mark Davis	4–0	(England) Lee Page
(Norway) Kurt Maflin	2–4	(England) Elliot Slessor
(England) Jamie Cope	4–3	(England) Martin O'Donnell
(England) Michael Holt	4–2	(Scotland) Fraser Patrick
(England) Tom Ford	4–0	(England) Craig Steadman
(Wales) Jamie Jones	4–1	(Germany) Patrick Einsle
(China) Cao Yupeng	1–4	(England) Paul Davison
(Scotland) Stephen Maguire	4–1	(Wales) Andrew Pagett
(England) Stuart Bingham	4–1	(England) Ian Burns
(China) Liu Chuang	4–0	(Egypt) Mohamed Khairy
(England) Steve Davis	1–4	(Thailand) Thanawat Thirapongpaiboon
(England) Ben Woollaston	3–4	(China) Lyu Haotian
(Scotland) Marcus Campbell	4–3	(England) Shane Castle
(England) Matthew Selt	0–4	(India) Pankaj Advani
(England) Nigel Bond	4–3	(China) Li Hang
(Northern Ireland) Mark Allen	4–1	(England) John Astley
(England) Robert Milkins	2–4	(China) Chen Zhe
(England) Jimmy Robertson	3–4	(England) Hammad Miah
(China) Xiao Guodong	2–4	(India) Aditya Mehta
(England) Peter Ebdon	4–1	(England) Ashley Carty
(Wales) Mark Williams	4–0	(Northern Ireland) Joe Swail
(China) Yu Delu	4–2	(England) Stuart Carrington
(England) Jack Lisowski	2–4	(England) Liam Highfield
(England) Mark Selby	4–3	(Wales) Daniel Wells

== Century breaks ==
=== Televised stage centuries ===
- 142, 109, 107, 106, 100 – Ding Junhui
- 138, 123, 103 – Anthony McGill
- 137 – Marco Fu
- 135, 125, 120 – Gary Wilson
- 134 – Pankaj Advani
- 133, 125 – Michael White
- 133 – Zhang Anda
- 132, 127, 122 – Aditya Mehta
- 131, 101 – Ratchayothin Yotharuck
- 119, 119, 117 – Stuart Bingham
- 114 – Mark Joyce
- 108 – Rod Lawler
- 104, 103, 103, 103, 100 – Neil Robertson
- 103, 100 – Robbie Williams
- 102 – Ken Doherty
- 102 – Ricky Walden
- 101 – Liu Chuang
- 100 – Liang Wenbo
- 100 – Mark Williams

=== Qualifying stage centuries ===
- 136 – Andrew Higginson
- 134 – Marco Fu
- 129 – Martin O'Donnell
- 126 – Elliot Slessor
- 125 – Chen Zhe
- 121 – Fergal O'Brien
- 114 – Mark Davis
- 111 – Jamie O'Neill
- 109, 101 – Zhang Anda
- 105 – Peter Ebdon
- 105 – Xiao Guodong
- 105 – Liam Highfield
- 104 – Aditya Mehta
- 103 – Graeme Dott
- 103 – Paul Davison
- 102 – Fraser Patrick
- 101 – David Gilbert
- 101 – Kyren Wilson
- 100 – Joe Perry
- 100 – Kurt Maflin
