= 2015 IBSF World Under-18 Snooker Championship =

IBSF World Under-18 Snooker Championship
Tournament information
- Dates: 3–10 October 2015
- Venue: Maza Park Centre
- City: St. Petersburg
- Country: Russia
- Organisation: IBSF
- Highest break: (Egypt) Abdelrahman Shahin (109)

Final
- Champion: (Hong Kong) Ka Wai Cheung
- Runner-up: (Hong Kong) Ming Tung Chan
- Score: 5–2

The 2015 IBSF World Under-18 Snooker Championship was an amateur snooker tournament that took place from 3 October to 10 October 2015 in St. Petersburg, Russia It was the 1st edition of the IBSF World Under-18 Snooker Championship.

The tournament was won by number 8 seed Ka Wai Cheung who defeated fellow countryman Ming Tung Chan 5–2 in the final.

== Results ==
=== Round 1 ===
Best of 5 frames

33	(France) Nicolas Mortreux	0–3	32	(Iran) Shervin Omidvar
17	(Wales) Jackson Page	3–0	48	(Russia) Alexandr Likholat
41	(India) Kaavya Bharath	3–2	24	(Wales) Josh White
25	(India) Mehul Saini	3–2	40	(Russia) Mikhail Terekhov
37	(Russia) Andrew Britanchuk	0–3	28	(India) Ranveer Duggal
21	(Israel) Amir Nardeia	3–0	44	(Slovakia) Kevin Cizmarovic
45	(Kyrgyzstan) Karimberdi Uulu Mohammed	2–3	20	(Latvia) Rodion Judin
29	(India) Vishvas Mangla	3–1	36	(Russia) Alexandr Zimenkov

35	(Belarus) Vladislav Romanovski	3–0	30	(Russia) Maxim Frolov
19	(Iran) Hassan Zabihpour	3–0	46	(Russia) Andrey Gladyk
43	(India) Digvijay Kadian	0–3	22	(France) Niel Vincent
27	(Latvia) Sergejs Sergejev	0–3	38	(Iran) Erfan Naderi Moghaddam
39	(Iran) Mohammadamin Mazandarani	3–2	26	(India) Rakesh Kamaraj
23	(Iran) Alireza Abbasi Bafrajard	3–0	42	(Russia) Maksim Vereshchagin
47	(Latvia) Filips Kalniņš	0–3	18	(Iran) Amin Sanjaei
31	(Russia) Kirill Petrov	2–3	34	(Belarus) Kirill Margolin

Round 2 Best of 5 frames
1	(India) Shrikrishna Suryanarayanan	3
32	(Iran) Shervin Omidvar	0
17	(Wales) Jackson Page	2
16	(Japan) Keishin Kamihashi	3
9	(Russia) Ivan Kakovsky	0
41	(India) Kaavya Bharath	3
25	(India) Mehul Saini	0
8	(Hong Kong) Ka Wai Cheung	3
5	(Wales) Dylan Emery	3
28	(India) Ranveer Duggal	1
21	(Israel) Amir Nardeia	3
12	(Pakistan) Muhammad Saqib	0
13	(Egypt) Mahmoud Elhareedy	1
20	(Latvia) Rodion Judin	3
29	(India) Vishvas Mangla	0
4	(Egypt) Abdelrahman Shahin	3
3	(Wales) Tyler Rees	3
35	(Belarus) Vladislav Romanovski	0
19	(Iran) Hassan Zabihpour	3
14	(Russia) Nikolai Voevodin	2
11	(Pakistan) Abdul Raheem	3
22	(France) Niel Vincent	1
38	(Iran) Erfan Naderi Moghaddam	1
6	(Iran) Arman Atashsokhan	3
7	(Finland) Patrik Tiihonen	3
26	(Iran) Mohammadamin Mazandarani	0
23	(Iran) Alireza Abbasi Bafrajard	0
10	(Hong Kong) Yun Fung Tam	3
15	(Hong Kong) Ming Tung Chan	3
18	(Iran) Amin Sanjaei	1
34	(Belarus) Kirill Margolin	2
2	(Czech Republic) Ales Herout	3

Round 3 Best of 7 frames
1	(India) Shrikrishna Suryanarayanan	4
16	(Japan) Keishin Kamihashi	2
41	(India) Kaavya Bharath	0
8	(Hong Kong) Ka Wai Cheung	4
5	(Wales) Dylan Emery	4
21	(Israel) Amir Nardeia	1
20	(Latvia) Rodion Judin	4
4	(Egypt) Abdelrahman Shahin	0
3	(Wales) Tyler Rees	4
19	(Iran) Hassan Zabihpour	0
11	(Pakistan) Abdul Raheem	4
6	(Iran) Arman Atashsokhan	0
7	(Finland) Patrik Tiihonen	1
10	(Hong Kong) Yun Fung Tam	4
15	(Hong Kong) Ming Tung Chan	4
2	(Czech Republic) Ales Herout	1

Quarter-Finals; Best of 7 frames
1	(India) Shrikrishna Suryanarayanan	1
8	(Hong Kong) Ka Wai Cheung	4
5	(Wales) Dylan Emery	4
20	(Latvia) Rodion Judin	1
3	(Wales) Tyler Rees	3
11	(Pakistan) Abdul Raheem	4
10	(Hong Kong) Yun Fung Tam	3
15	(Hong Kong) Ming Tung Chan	4

Semi-Finals; Best of 7 frames
8	(Hong Kong) Ka Wai Cheung	4
5	(Wales) Dylan Emery	2
11	(Pakistan) Abdul Raheem	1
15	(Hong Kong) Ming Tung Chan	4

Final; Best of 9 frames
8	(Hong Kong) Ka Wai Cheung	5
15	(Hong Kong) Ming Tung Chan	2
