= 2013 Six-red World Championship =

Six-red World Championship

Tournament information
- Dates: 2–7 September 2013
- Venue: Montien Riverside Hotel
- City: Bangkok
- Country: Thailand
- Organisation: World Professional Billiards and Snooker Association
- Total prize fund: 6,000,000 baht
- Winner's share: 2,000,000 baht

Final
- Champion: (England) Mark Davis
- Runner-up: (Australia) Neil Robertson
- Score: 8–4

The 2013 Six-red World Championship (often styled the 2013 SangSom 6-red World Championship for sponsorship and marketing purposes) was a six-red snooker tournament held between 2 and 7 September 2013 at the Montien Riverside Hotel in Bangkok, Thailand.

Mark Davis defended his title, which he won in 2012, by defeating Neil Robertson 8–4 in the final.

== Prize money ==
The breakdown of prize money for this year is shown below:

- Winner: 2,000,000 baht
- Runner-up: 800,000 baht
- Semi-finalists: 400,000 baht
- Quarter-finalists: 200,000 baht
- Last 16: 100,000 baht
- Last 32: 50,000 baht
- Total: 6,000,000 baht

== Round-robin stage ==
The top four players from each group qualified for the knock-out stage. All matches were best of 9 frames.

=== Group A ===
POS	Player	MP	MW	FW	FL	FD	PTS
1	(Wales) Dominic Dale	5	4	24	12	+12	4
2	(England) Gary Wilson	5	4	22	14	+8	4
3	(England) Mark Davis	5	3	21	19	+2	3
4	(Thailand) Issara Kachaiwong	5	2	21	20	+1	2
5	(China) Cao Yupeng	5	2	15	23	−8	2
6	(Morocco) Chaouki Yousfi	5	0	10	25	−15	0

- Gary Wilson 5–1 Chaouki Yousfi
- Dominic Dale 5–2 Cao Yupeng
- Mark Davis 5–3 Issara Kachaiwong
- Cao Yupeng 0–5 Gary Wilson
- Mark Davis 2–5 Dominic Dale
- Cao Yupeng 5–4 Issara Kachaiwong
- Mark Davis 5–3 Cao Yupeng
- Dominic Dale 5–2 Gary Wilson
- Mark Davis 5–3 Chaouki Yousfi
- Dominic Dale 4–5 Issara Kachaiwong
- Cao Yupeng 5–4 Chaouki Yousfi
- Gary Wilson 5–4 Issara Kachaiwong
- Dominic Dale 5–1 Chaouki Yousfi
- Mark Davis 4–5 Gary Wilson
- Chaouki Yousfi 1–5 Issara Kachaiwong

=== Group B ===
POS	Player	MP	MW	FW	FL	FD	PTS
1	(England) Andrew Higginson	5	5	25	9	+16	5
2	(England) Mark Selby	5	4	24	10	+14	4
3	(Thailand) Noppon Saengkham	5	3	16	15	+1	3
4	(Iceland) Kristján Helgason	5	1	17	20	−3	1
5	(Australia) Adrian Ridley	5	1	13	24	−11	1
6	(Egypt) Ahmed Galal	5	1	7	24	−17	1

- Adrian Ridley 4–5 Ahmed Galal
- Mark Selby 5–1 Noppon Saengkham
- Andrew Higginson 5–3 Kristján Helgason
- Mark Selby 4–5 Andrew Higginson
- Kristján Helgason 4–5 Adrian Ridley
- Ahmed Galal 0–5 Noppon Saengkham
- Kristján Helgason 5–0 Ahmed Galal
- Adrian Ridley 2–5 Noppon Saengkham
- Andrew Higginson 5–1 Ahmed Galal
- Mark Selby 5–1 Adrian Ridley
- Kristján Helgason 3–5 Noppon Saengkham
- Andrew Higginson 5–1 Adrian Ridley
- Mark Selby 5–2 Kristján Helgason
- Mark Selby 5–1 Ahmed Galal
- Andrew Higginson 5–0 Noppon Saengkham

=== Group C ===
POS	Player	MP	MW	FW	FL	FD	PTS
1	(Australia) Neil Robertson	5	5	25	8	+17	5
2	(Thailand) Dechawat Poomjaeng	5	4	22	18	+4	4
3	(England) Jimmy White	5	2	14	17	−3	2
4	(England) Joe Perry	5	2	17	20	−3	2
5	(Wales) Darren Morgan	5	1	16	23	−7	1
6	(Iran) Amir Sarkhosh	5	1	14	22	−8	1

- Jimmy White 1–5 Dechawat Poomjaeng
- Joe Perry 5–4 Amir Sarkhosh
- Neil Robertson 5–4 Darren Morgan
- Darren Morgan 4–5 Dechawat Poomjaeng
- Jimmy White 5–0 Amir Sarkhosh
- Neil Robertson 5–1 Joe Perry
- Darren Morgan 2–5 Amir Sarkhosh
- Joe Perry 4–5 Dechawat Poomjaeng
- Neil Robertson 5–0 Jimmy White
- Joe Perry 5–1 Darren Morgan
- Neil Robertson 5–2 Dechawat Poomjaeng
- Amir Sarkhosh 4–5 Dechawat Poomjaeng
- Joe Perry 2–5 Jimmy White
- Neil Robertson 5–1 Amir Sarkhosh
- Jimmy White 3–5 Darren Morgan

=== Group D ===
POS	Player	MP	MW	FW	FL	FD	PTS
1	(England) Robert Milkins	5	5	25	11	+14	5
2	(England) Judd Trump	5	4	24	14	+10	4
3	(Republic of Ireland) Robert Murphy	5	2	17	19	−2	2
4	(India) Laxman Rawat	5	2	15	18	−3	2
5	(Iran) Hossein Vafaei	5	2	16	22	−6	2
6	(Thailand) Passakorn Suwannawat	5	0	12	25	−13	0

- Robert Murphy 1–5 Laxman Rawat
- Hossein Vafaei 5–4 Passakorn Suwannawat
- Robert Milkins 5–0 Laxman Rawat
- Robert Murphy 5–2 Hossein Vafaei
- Judd Trump 4–5 Robert Milkins
- Robert Murphy 5–2 Passakorn Suwannawat
- Robert Milkins 5–3 Hossein Vafaei
- Judd Trump 5–2 Laxman Rawat
- Robert Milkins 5–1 Passakorn Suwannawat
- Judd Trump 5–1 Hossein Vafaei
- Laxman Rawat 5–2 Passakorn Suwannawat
- Judd Trump 5–3 Robert Murphy
- Hossein Vafaei 5–3 Laxman Rawat
- Judd Trump 5–3 Passakorn Suwannawat
- Robert Milkins 5–3 Robert Murphy

=== Group E ===
POS	Player	MP	MW	FW	FL	FD	PTS
1	(Wales) Mark Williams	5	4	24	11	+13	4
2	(England) Shaun Murphy	5	4	24	12	+12	4
3	(Finland) Robin Hull	5	3	19	19	0	3
4	(Thailand) Thepchaiya Un-Nooh	5	2	17	18	−1	2
5	(Australia) Vinnie Calabrese	5	2	13	23	−10	2
6	(Syria) Omar Al Kojah	5	0	11	25	−14	0

- Robin Hull 5–3 Omar Al Kojah
- Vinnie Calabrese 1–5 Thepchaiya Un-Nooh
- Mark Williams 5–1 Omar Al Kojah
- Shaun Murphy 4–5 Vinnie Calabrese
- Vinnie Calabrese 5–4 Omar Al Kojah
- Mark Williams 5–2 Robin Hull
- Shaun Murphy 5–0 Thepchaiya Un-Nooh
- Robin Hull 5–2 Vinnie Calabrese
- Shaun Murphy 5–4 Mark Williams
- Omar Al Kojah 2–5 Thepchaiya Un-Nooh
- Robin Hull 5–4 Thepchaiya Un-Nooh
- Mark Williams 5–0 Vinnie Calabrese
- Shaun Murphy 5–1 Omar Al Kojah
- Mark Williams 5–3 Thepchaiya Un-Nooh
- Shaun Murphy 5–2 Robin Hull

=== Group F ===
POS	Player	MP	MW	FW	FL	FD	PTS
1	(Wales) Matthew Stevens	5	4	24	12	+12	4
2	(Republic of Ireland) Ken Doherty	5	4	21	12	+9	4
3	(Scotland) Stephen Maguire	5	4	20	13	+7	4
4	(Thailand) Ratchayothin Yotharuck	5	2	17	19	−2	2
5	(Malta) Alex Borg	5	1	13	23	−10	1
6	(Pakistan) Muhammad Majid Ali	5	0	9	25	−16	0

- Matthew Stevens 5–1 Ken Doherty
- Alex Borg 5–3 Muhammad Majid Ali
- Stephen Maguire 5–4 Matthew Stevens
- Ken Doherty 5–4 Alex Borg
- Stephen Maguire 5–4 Ratchayothin Yotharuck
- Ken Doherty 5–2 Ratchayothin Yotharuck
- Matthew Stevens 5–3 Alex Borg
- Ken Doherty 5–1 Muhammad Majid Ali
- Matthew Stevens 5–1 Ratchayothin Yotharuck
- Stephen Maguire 5–0 Muhammad Majid Ali
- Stephen Maguire 0–5 Ken Doherty
- Alex Borg 1–5 Ratchayothin Yotharuck
- Matthew Stevens 5–2 Muhammad Majid Ali
- Stephen Maguire 5–0 Alex Borg
- Muhammad Majid Ali 3–5 Ratchayothin Yotharuck

=== Group G ===
POS	Player	MP	MW	FW	FL	FD	PTS
1	(Scotland) John Higgins	5	5	25	7	+18	5
2	(England) Stuart Bingham	5	4	23	12	+11	4
3	(Afghanistan) Mohammad Rais Senzahi	5	2	14	22	−8	2
4	(England) John Whitty	5	2	14	22	−8	2
5	(Thailand) Thanawat Thirapongpaiboon	5	1	17	22	−5	1
6	(United Arab Emirates) Mohamed Al-Joker	5	1	15	23	−8	1

- John Whitty 5–4 Thanawat Thirapongpaiboon
- John Higgins 5–0 Mohammad Rais Senzahi
- John Whitty 5–3 Mohamed Al-Joker
- John Higgins 5–1 Thanawat Thirapongpaiboon
- Stuart Bingham 5–1 Mohamed Al-Joker
- John Higgins 5–0 John Whitty
- Mohammad Rais Senzahi 5–3 Mohamed Al-Joker
- Stuart Bingham 3–5 John Higgins
- John Whitty 4–5 Mohammad Rais Senzahi
- Stuart Bingham 5–4 Thanawat Thirapongpaiboon
- Stuart Bingham 5–0 John Whitty
- Mohammad Rais Senzahi 2–5 Thanawat Thirapongpaiboon
- John Higgins 5–3 Mohamed Al-Joker
- Stuart Bingham 5–2 Mohammad Rais Senzahi
- Mohamed Al-Joker 5–3 Thanawat Thirapongpaiboon

=== Group H ===
POS	Player	MP	MW	FW	FL	FD	PTS
1	(England) Ricky Walden	5	3	19	14	+5	3
2	(Wales) Andrew Pagett	5	3	18	16	+2	3
3	(England) Steve Davis	5	3	18	17	+1	3
4	(Thailand) James Wattana	5	3	16	18	−2	3
5	(England) Barry Hawkins	5	2	16	17	−1	2
6	(Pakistan) Muhammad Asif	5	1	17	22	−5	1

- Steve Davis 5–1 Andrew Pagett
- Muhammad Asif 4–5 James Wattana
- Ricky Walden 0–5 Barry Hawkins
- Ricky Walden 5–2 Muhammad Asif
- Steve Davis 1–5 James Wattana
- Barry Hawkins 5–2 Muhammad Asif
- Ricky Walden 4–5 Steve Davis
- Barry Hawkins 3–5 James Wattana
- Ricky Walden 5–2 Andrew Pagett
- Muhammad Asif 4–5 Andrew Pagett
- Barry Hawkins 2–5 Steve Davis
- Andrew Pagett 5–1 James Wattana
- Steve Davis 2–5 Muhammad Asif
- Ricky Walden 5–0 James Wattana
- Barry Hawkins 1–5 Andrew Pagett

== Knockout stage ==
Last 32; Best of 11 frames
(Scotland) John Higgins	6
(Thailand) Thepchaiya Un-Nooh	1
(England) Mark Davis	6
(Thailand) Dechawat Poomjaeng	5
(Republic of Ireland) Ken Doherty	0
(Thailand) Noppon Saengkham	6
(India) Laxman Rawat	4
(England) Ricky Walden	6
(Wales) Mark Williams	6
(Thailand) James Wattana	1
(England) Jimmy White	4
(England) Gary Wilson	6
(England) Mark Selby	6
(Scotland) Stephen Maguire	4
(England) John Whitty	2
(England) Robert Milkins	6
(England) Andrew Higginson	1
(England) Joe Perry	6
(Republic of Ireland) Robert Murphy	6
(Wales) Andrew Pagett	3
(England) Stuart Bingham	6
(Finland) Robin Hull	4
(Thailand) Ratchayothin Yotharuck	3
(Wales) Dominic Dale	6
(Wales) Matthew Stevens	6
(Iceland) Kristján Helgason	2
(Afghanistan) Mohammad Rais Senzahi	5
(England) Shaun Murphy	6
(England) Judd Trump	6
(England) Steve Davis	4
(Thailand) Issara Kachaiwong	5
(Australia) Neil Robertson	6

Last 16; Best of 11 frames
(Scotland) John Higgins	0
(England) Mark Davis	6
(Thailand) Noppon Saengkham	6
(England) Ricky Walden	3
(Wales) Mark Williams	6
(England) Gary Wilson	4
(England) Mark Selby	6
(England) Robert Milkins	4
(England) Joe Perry	6
(Republic of Ireland) Robert Murphy	1
(England) Stuart Bingham	6
(Wales) Dominic Dale	4
(Wales) Matthew Stevens	0
(England) Shaun Murphy	6
(England) Judd Trump	5
(Australia) Neil Robertson	6

Quarter-finals; Best of 11 frames
(England) Mark Davis	6
(Thailand) Noppon Saengkham	4
(Wales) Mark Williams	4
(England) Mark Selby	6
(England) Joe Perry	5
(England) Stuart Bingham	6
(England) Shaun Murphy	3
(Australia) Neil Robertson	6

Semi-finals; Best of 13 frames
(England) Mark Davis	7
(England) Mark Selby	4
(England) Stuart Bingham	4
(Australia) Neil Robertson	7

Final; Best of 15 frames
(England) Mark Davis	8
(Australia) Neil Robertson	4
