= Hainan Exhibition & Convention Center =

Convention Center in China

Coordinates: 20.031225°N 110.305368°E

Hainan Exhibition & Convention Center 海口会展中心
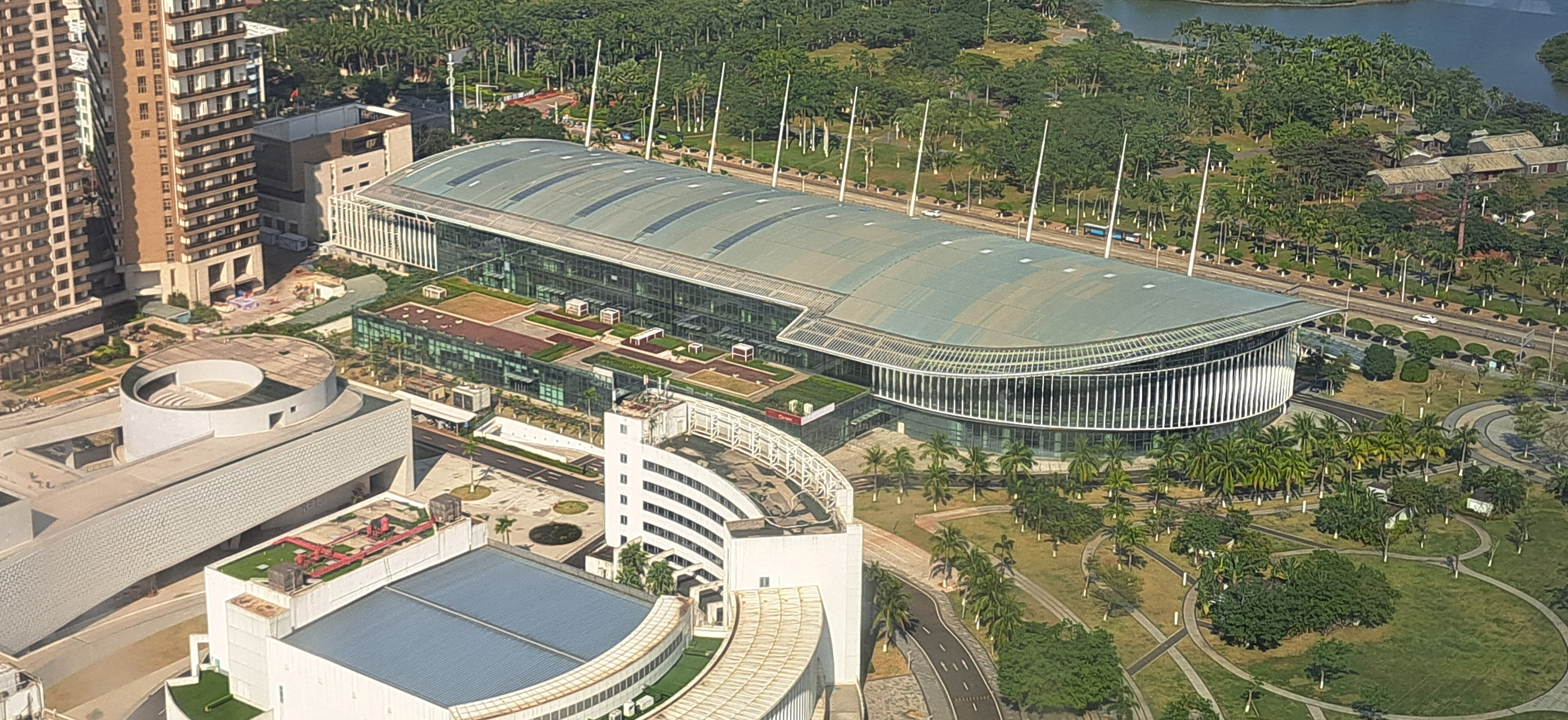
- Hainan Exhibition & Convention Center in December 2025
- Interactive map of Hainan Exhibition & Convention Center 海口会展中心
- Location: Haikou, Hainan, China

Construction
- Built: 2002

The Hainan Exhibition & Convention Center (Chinese: 海口会展中心) was the main convention centre in Haikou City, Hainan Province, China. It is located on Binhai Road adjacent to Evergreen Park. It was completed in 2002.

== Closure ==
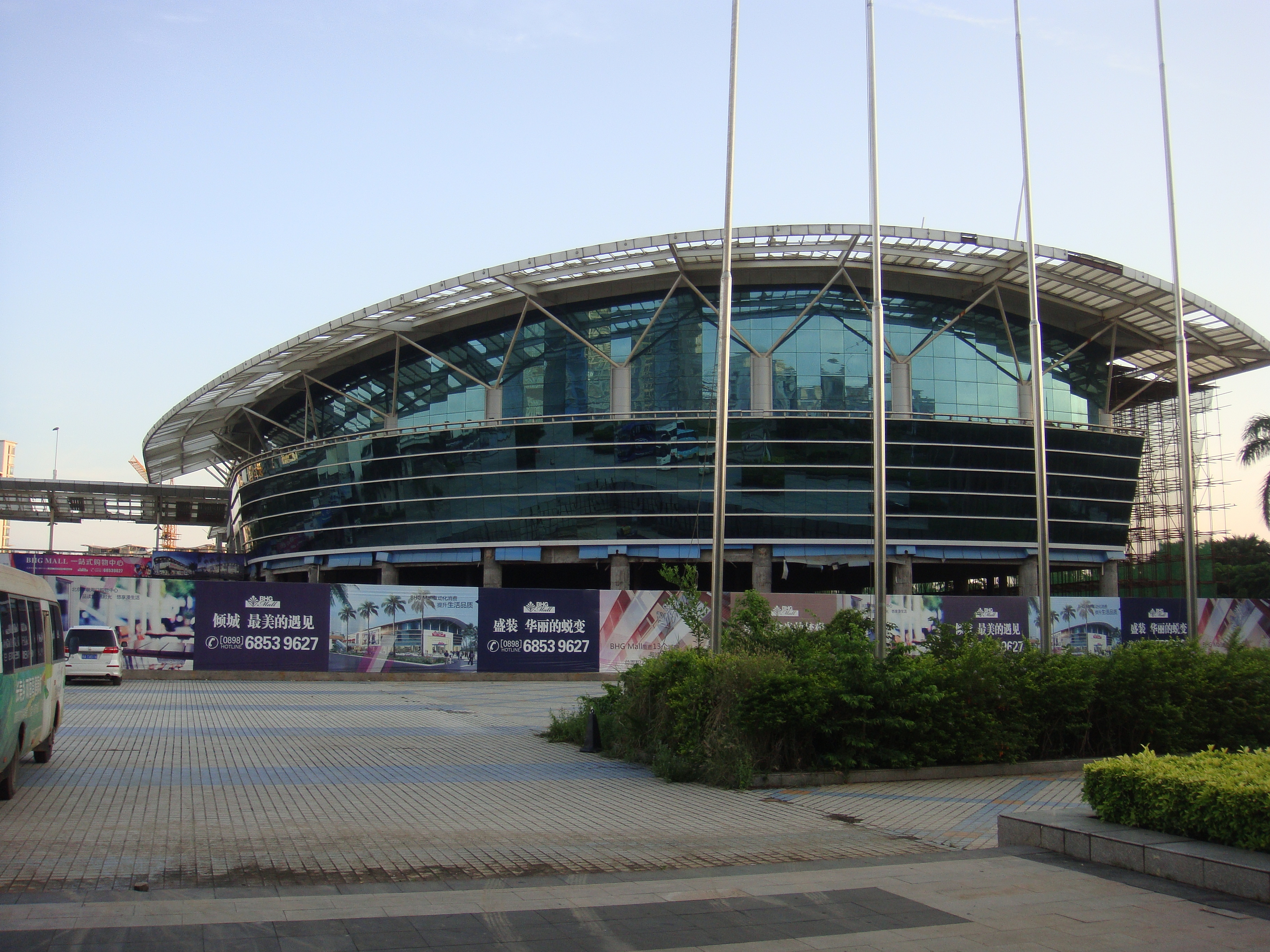

Around 2015, the Hainan Exhibition & Convention Center was closed. It is replaced by the much larger Hainan International Convention And Exhibition Center located on the north coast of the province, roughly 20 km west of downtown Haikou.
