= Mohammad Majid Ali =

Pakistani snooker player (1993/1994–2023)

Personal information
- Born: 1993/1994 Samundri, Faisalabad District, Punjab, Pakistan
- Died: 29 June 2023 (aged 29) Samundri, Faisalabad District, Punjab, Pakistan

Sport
- Country: Pakistan
- Sport: Snooker

Mohammad Majid Ali (1993/1994 – 29 June 2023) was a Pakistani snooker player who represented his country numerous times at international events and consistently ranked among the top players in the country. He was also an Asian U21 Silver medalist.

Ali committed suicide on 29 June 2023, at the age of 29. He had been reportedly suffering from severe depression for the last few years and had been advised medication.

== Amateur final ==
Outcome	No.	Year	Championship	Opponent in the final	Score
Runner-up	1.	2013	Asian Under-21 Snooker Championship	(Thailand) Noppon Saengkham	5–6
