= ACBS Asian Under-21 Snooker Championship =

The ACBS Asian Under-21 Snooker Championship is the premier non-professional junior snooker tournament in Asia. The event series is sanctioned by the Asian Confederation of Billiard Sports and started from 1993. In most of the seasons, the winner of the tournament qualifies for the next season of the Professional Snooker Tour.

== Winners ==
=== Boys ===
Year	Venue	Winner	Runner-up	Score
1993	Pakistan	(Thailand) Anan Terananon	(Pakistan) Farhan Mirza	8–6
1994	Brunei	(Thailand) Phaitoon Phonbun	(Pakistan) Farhan Mirza	6–4
2001	Thailand	(Thailand) Supoj Saenla	(India) Manan Chandra	6–0
2002	India	(China) Ding Junhui	(Thailand) Pramual Janthad	6–2
2004	Malaysia	(Thailand) Pramual Janthad	(Malaysia) Moh Keen Ho	6–4
2005	Thailand	(Malaysia) Moh Keen Ho	(Thailand) Kobkit Palajin	6–3
2006	Iran	(Thailand) Passakorn Suwannawat	(Thailand) Kobkit Palajin	6–4
2007	Doha, Qatar	(China) Xiao Guodong	(Thailand) Chinnakrit Yoawansiri	6–2
2008	Yangon, Myanmar	(China) Li Hang	(China) Li Yuan	6–1
2009	Pune, India	(China) Zhang Anda	(Thailand) Noppon Saengkham	5–1
2010	Indore, India	(China) Liu Chuang	(Thailand) Thanawat Thirapongpaiboon	6–5
2011	Kish, Iran	(China) Cao Yupeng	(Iran) Hossein Vafaei	7–3
2012	Goa, India	(Iran) Hossein Vafaei	(China) Zhang Anda	6–2
2013	Indore, India	(Thailand) Noppon Saengkham	(Pakistan) Mohammad Majid Ali	6–5
2014	Chandigarh, India	(Thailand) Thanawat Thirapongpaiboon	(Iran) Siyavosh Mozayani	6–1
2015	Beijing, China	(Thailand) Sunny Akani	(China) Yuan Sijun	6–4
2016	Colombo, Sri Lanka	(China) Wang Yuchen	(Thailand) Ratchayothin Yotharuck	6–5
2017	Chandigarh, India	(China) Yuan Sijun	(China) Fan Zhengyi	6–2
2018	Yangon, Myanmar	(Myanmar) Aung Phyo	(Pakistan) Haris Tahir	6–4
2019	Chandigarh, India	(China) Zhao Jianbo	(Hong Kong) Cheung Ka Wai	6–3
2023	Tehran, Iran	(Pakistan) Ahsan Ramzan	(Iran) Milad Pourali Darehchi	5–2
2024	Riyadh, Saudi Arabia	(Pakistan) Muhammad Hasnain Akhtar	(Pakistan) Ahsan Ramzan	4–3

=== Girls ===
Year	Venue	Winner	Runner-up	Score
2018	Myanmar	(India) Amee Kamani	(Thailand) Siripaporn Nuanthakhamjan	3–0

== Stats ==
=== Champions by country (Men's) ===
Rank	Nation	Gold	Silver	Bronze	Total
1	China (CHN)	9	4	7	20
2	Thailand (THA)	8	7	10	25
3	Pakistan (PAK)	2	5	3	10
4	Iran (IRI)	1	2	2	5
5	Malaysia (MAS)	1	1	2	4
6	Myanmar (MYA)	1	0	0	1
7	India (IND)	0	1	6	7
8	Hong Kong (HKG)	0	1	2	3
Totals (8 entries)		22	21	32	75

=== Champions by country (Women's) ===
Rank	Nation	Gold	Silver	Bronze	Total
1	India (IND)	1	0	1	2
2	Thailand (THA)	0	1	0	1
3	Hong Kong (HKG)	0	0	1	1
Totals (3 entries)		1	1	2	4

== See also ==
- World Snooker Tour
