= Cheung Ka Wai =

Snooker player from Hong Kong

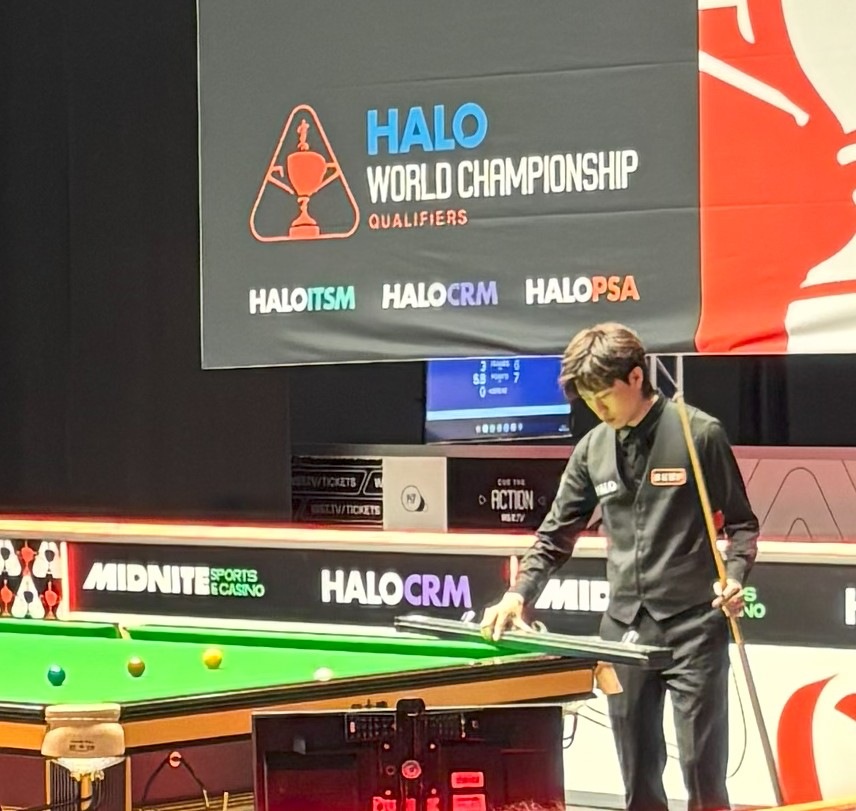

Personal information
- Born: 17 February 1999 (age 27)

Sport
- Country: Hong Kong
- Sport: Snooker
- Professional: 2024–present
- Highest ranking: 81 (July 2025)
- Current ranking: 110 (as of 4 October 2026)
- Best ranking finish: Last 16 (2026 Northern Ireland Open)
Medal record
Men's snooker
Representing Hong Kong
World Games
Gold medal – first place	2022 Birmingham	Singles

Cheung Ka Wai (Chinese: 張家瑋; born 17 February 1999), also known as Ka Wai Cheung, is a professional snooker player from Hong Kong. In February 2024 he won the 2024 WSF Open Championship, earning a two-year tour card on the World Snooker Tour starting with the 2024–25 snooker season.

== Career ==
=== Amateur ===
In 2015, Cheung won the IBSF World Under-18 Snooker Championship On 4 March 2015 it was announced that Cheung was invited to play in the 2016 World Snooker Championship qualifiers.

In 2022, Cheung won the gold medal at the World Games in Birmingham, Alabama, defeating Abdelrahman Shahin 3–1 in the final.

== Performance and rankings timeline ==
Tournament	2015/ 16	2018/ 19	2023/ 24	2024/ 25	2025/ 26	2026/ 27
Ranking (Note: It shows the ranking at the beginning of the season)	(Note: He was an amateur)			(Note: New players on the Main Tour don't have a ranking)	80	(Note: Players qualified through the Q School started the season without ranking points)
Ranking tournaments
Championship League	Non-Ranking		A	RR	RR	2R
China Open	A	A	Not Held			LQ
Wuhan Open	Not Held		A	1R	LQ	A
British Open	Not Held		A	1R	2R	LQ
English Open	NH	A	A	LQ	LQ	LQ
Shenzhen Open (Note: The event was called the Xi'an Grand Prix (2024/2025–2025/2026))	Not Held			LQ	LQ	LQ
Northern Ireland Open	NH	A	A	LQ	1R	3R
International Championship	A	A	A	LQ	LQ	LQ
UK Championship	A	A	A	LQ	LQ	
Shoot Out	NR	A	A	1R	1R	
Scottish Open	NH	A	A	LQ	LQ	LQ
German Masters	A	A	A	1R	LQ	
Welsh Open	A	A	A	LQ	LQ	
World Grand Prix	DNQ	DNQ	DNQ	DNQ	DNQ	
Players Championship (Note: The event was called the Players Tour Championship Grand Final (2015/2016))	DNQ	DNQ	DNQ	DNQ	DNQ	
World Open	NH	A	A	LQ	1R	
Tour Championship	NH	DNQ	DNQ	DNQ	DNQ	
World Championship	LQ	A	LQ	LQ	LQ	
Former ranking tournaments
Paul Hunter Classic	MR	LQ	Tournament Not Held			
Saudi Arabia Masters	Not Held			2R	2R	NH

Performance Table Legend
LQ	lost in the qualifying draw	#R	lost in the early rounds of the tournament (WR = Wildcard round, RR = Round robin)	QF	lost in the quarter-finals
SF	lost in the semi-finals	F	lost in the final	W	won the tournament
DNQ	did not qualify for the tournament	A	did not participate in the tournament	WD	withdrew from the tournament

NH / Not Held	means an event was not held.
NR / Non-Ranking Event	means an event is/was no longer a ranking event.
R / Ranking Event	means an event is/was a ranking event.
MR / Minor-Ranking Event	means an event is/was a minor-ranking event.

== Career finals ==
=== Non-ranking finals: 1 (1 title) ===
Outcome	No.	Year	Championship	Opponent in the final	Score
Winner	1.	2022	World Games	(Egypt) Abdelrahman Shahin	3–1

=== Amateur finals: 5 (3 titles) ===
Outcome	No.	Year	Championship	Opponent in the final	Score
Winner	1.	2015	IBSF World Under-18 Snooker Championship	(Hong Kong) Ming Tung Chan	5–2
Runner-up	1.	2019	Asian Under-21 Championship	(China) Zhao Jianbo	3–6
Winner	2.	2019	Challenge Tour – Event 1	(England) Oliver Brown	3–1
Runner-up	2.	2023	IBSF World Snooker Championship	(Qatar) Ali Alobaidli	1–6
Winner	3.	2024	WSF Championship	(China) Gao Yang	5–0

=== Team finals: 1 (1 title) ===
Outcome	No.	Year	Championship	Team/partner	Opponent in the final	Score
Winner	1.	2016	World Mixed Doubles Championship	(Hong Kong) Jaique Ip	(Israel) Eden Sharav (England) Maria Catalano	4–3
