= Hainan International Convention And Exhibition Center =

Building in Haikou, China

Hainan International Convention And Exhibition Center 海南国际会展中心
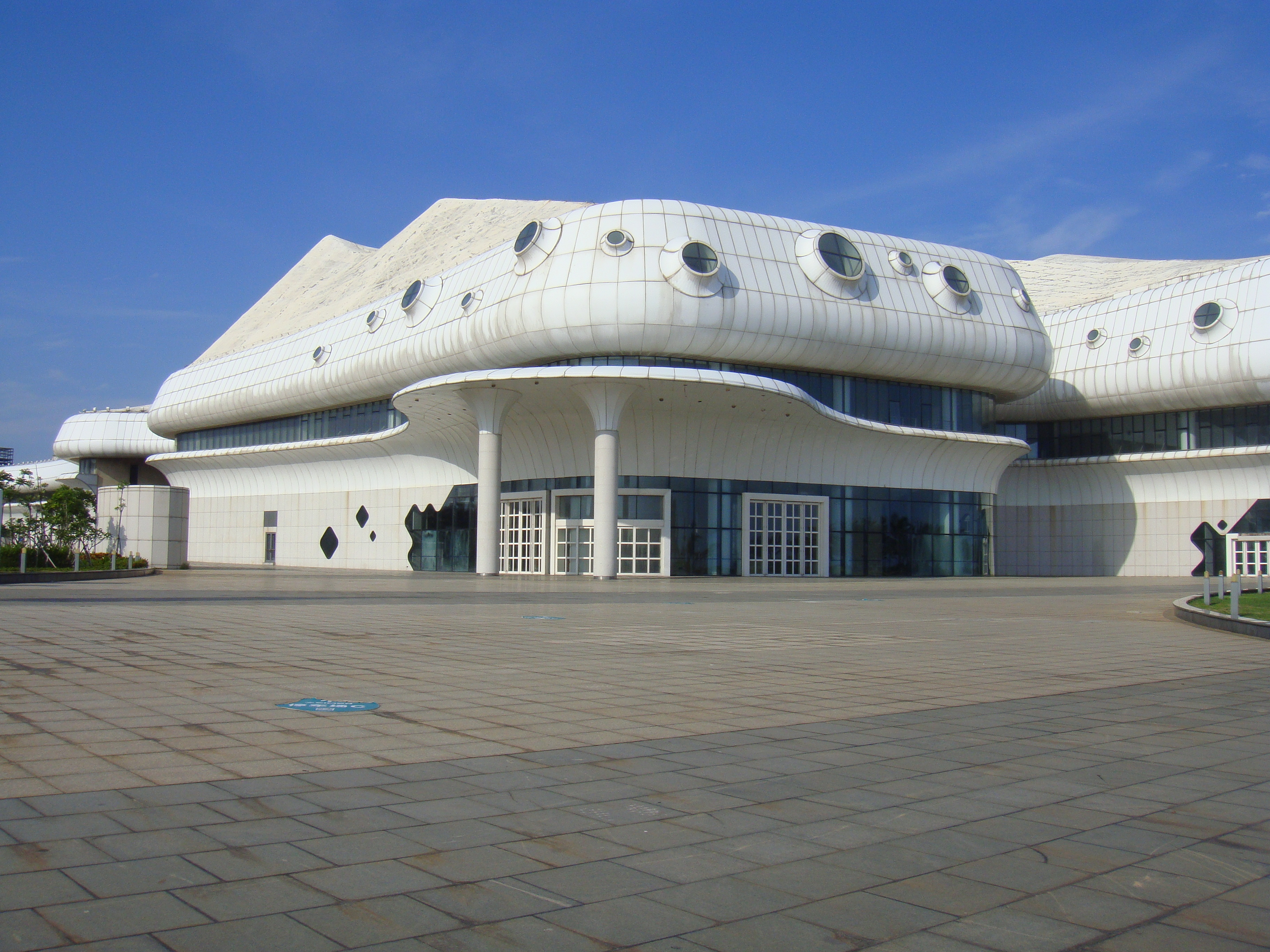
- Interactive map of Hainan International Convention And Exhibition Center 海南国际会展中心
- Location: Hainan Province, China
- Coordinates: 20°03′35″N 110°11′21″E

Construction
- Architect: Li Xinggang

Tenants
- Atelier Li Xinggang

Website
- http://www.hicec.com.cn/

The Hainan International Convention And Exhibition Center (Chinese: 海南国际会展中心) designed and built by Atelier Li Xinggang is located around 20 km west of the centre of Haikou, on the north coast of Hainan Province, China. The total area of the site is 136,200 square meters, which contains a 77,000 m^{2} exhibition center and a 42,000 m^{2} convention center.

Before this convention centre opened, the smaller Hainan Exhibition & Convention Center served as the area's main convention centre. The building is located downtown directly to the west of Evergreen Park. It closed in 2015 and is being converted into a mall.

== Artificial island ==
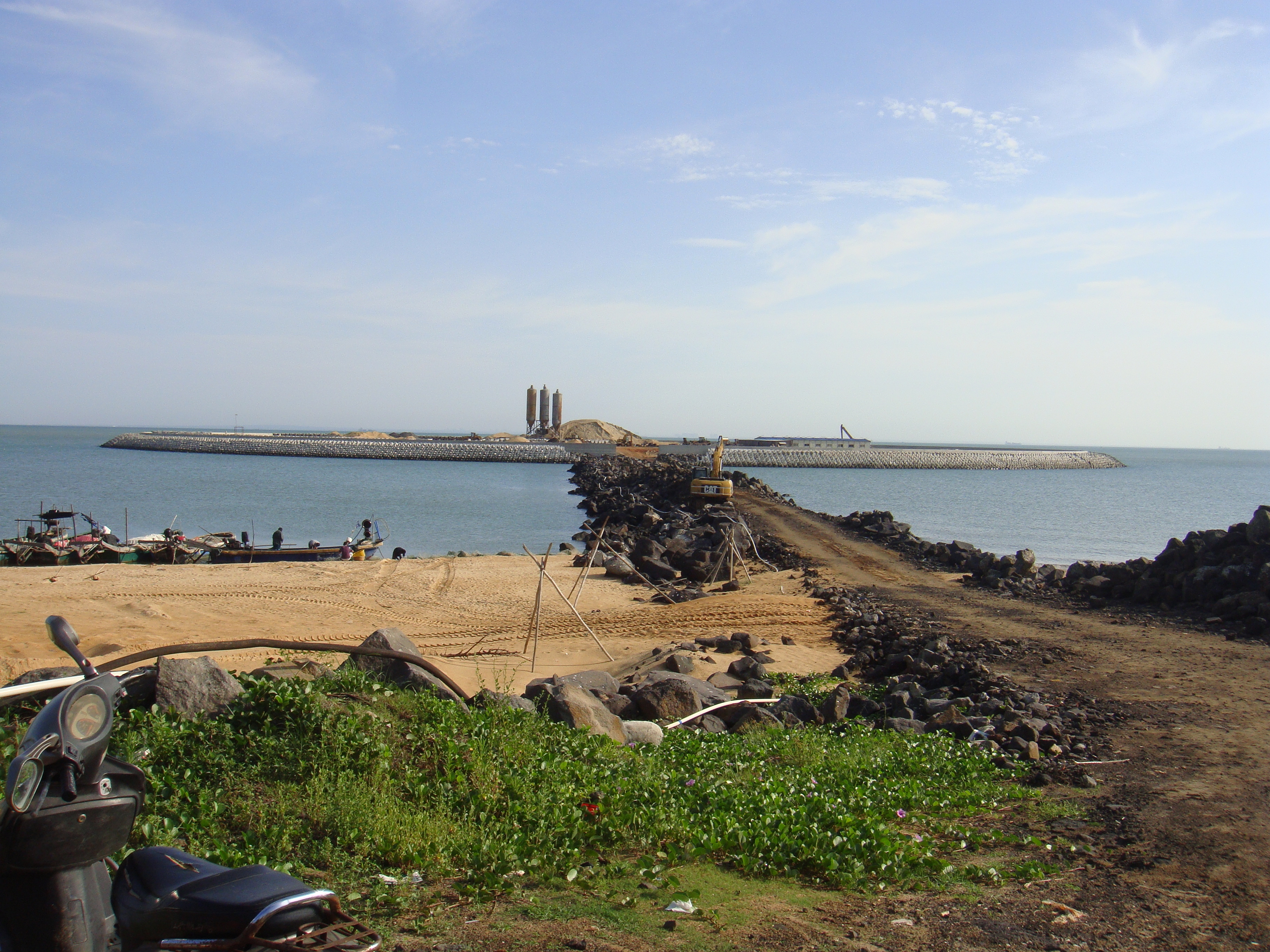
Artificial island during the first stages of construction

A hotel complex on an artificial island will become part of the convention center. Situated in the sea less than 100 metres to the north, this circular, 6-acre island is currently under construction. As of May 2015, it consists only of earth and rock with a causeway leading to it, but will be designed to resemble a Maneki-neko. Eventually, a hotel complex and marina will be built. The 108-storey, 300-metre-tall luxury hotel is expected to cost 28 billion yuan.

== Gallery ==
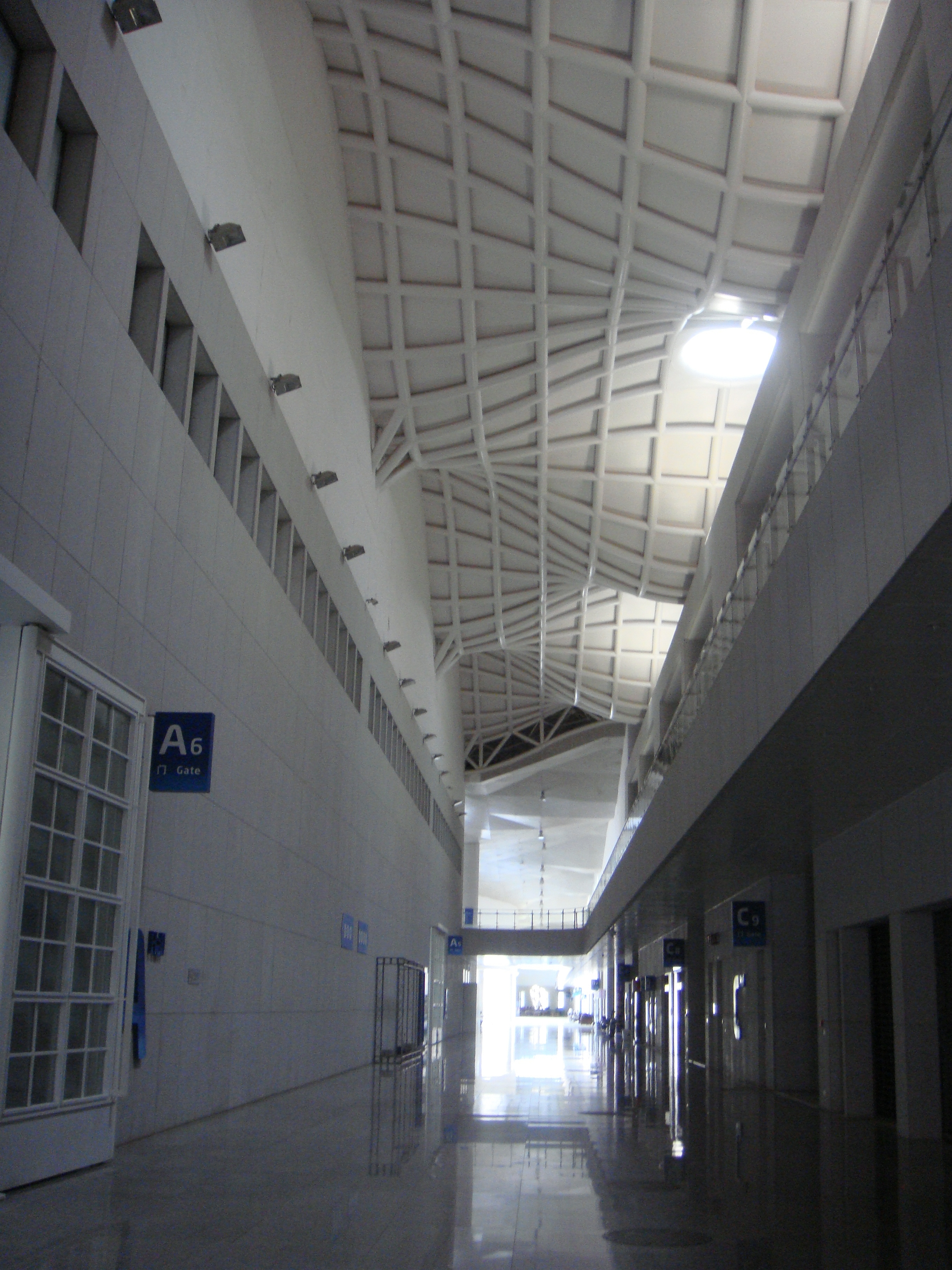
One of the main corridors

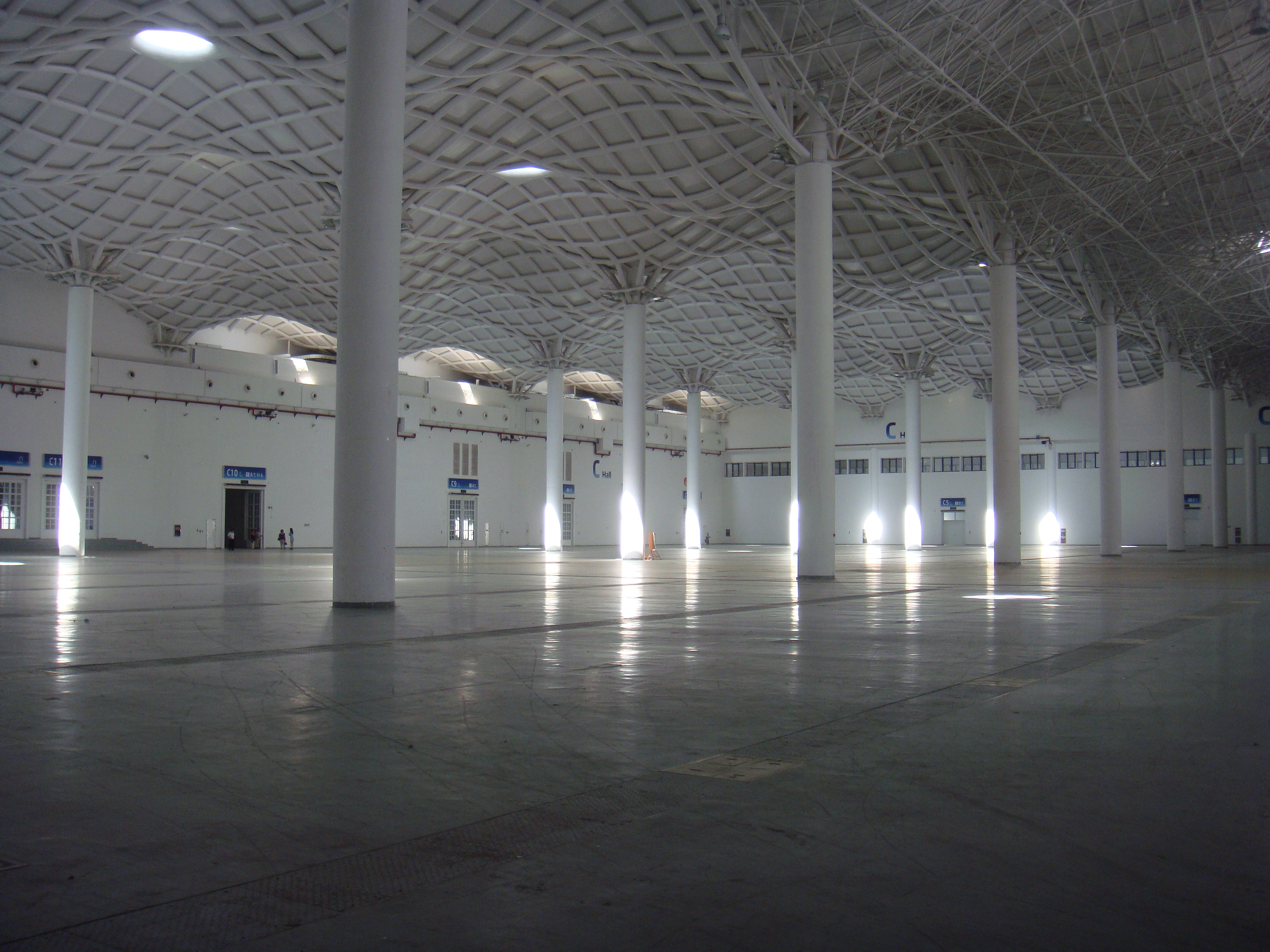
Hall C

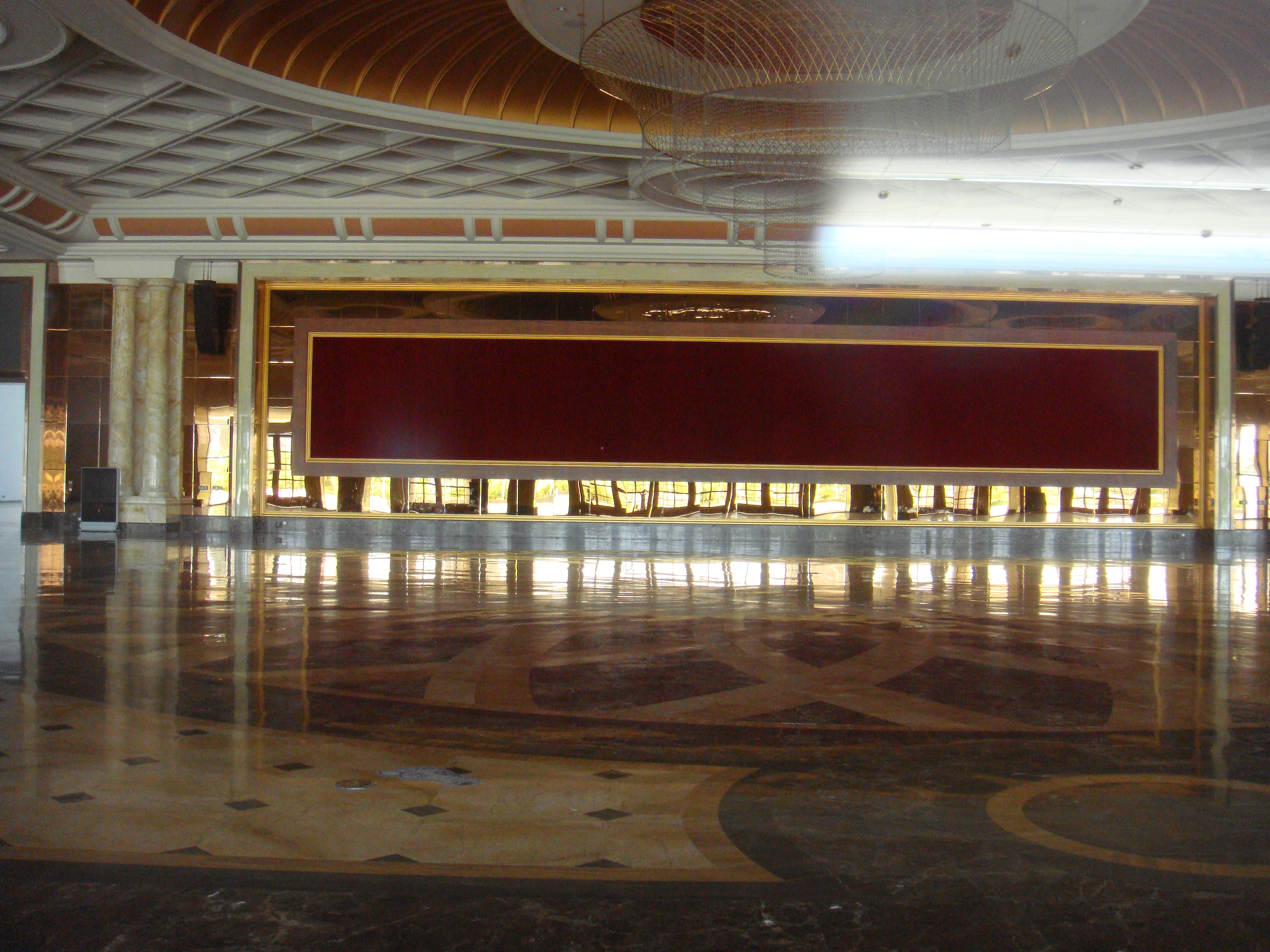
Reception hall

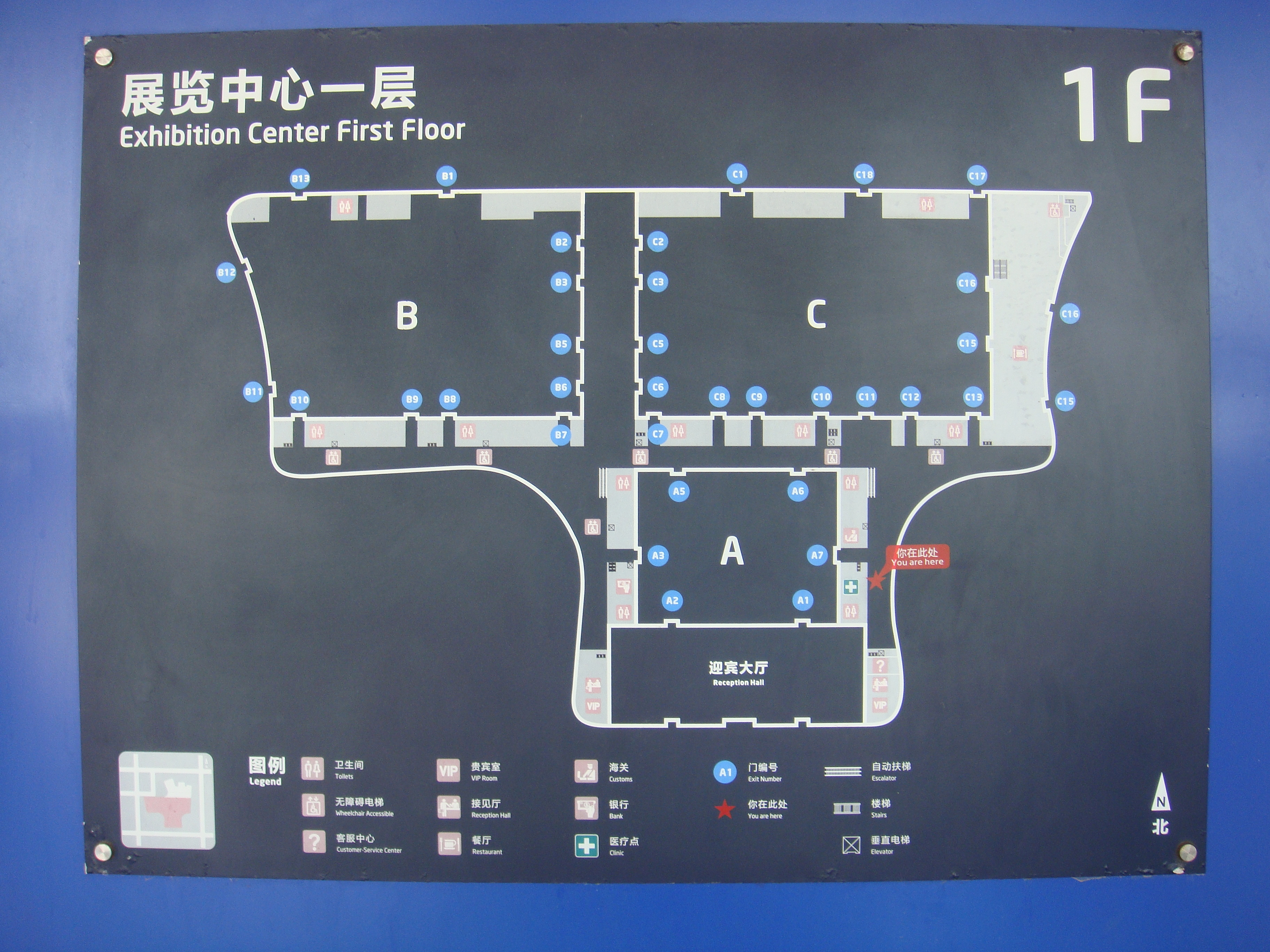
Floor plan of first floor

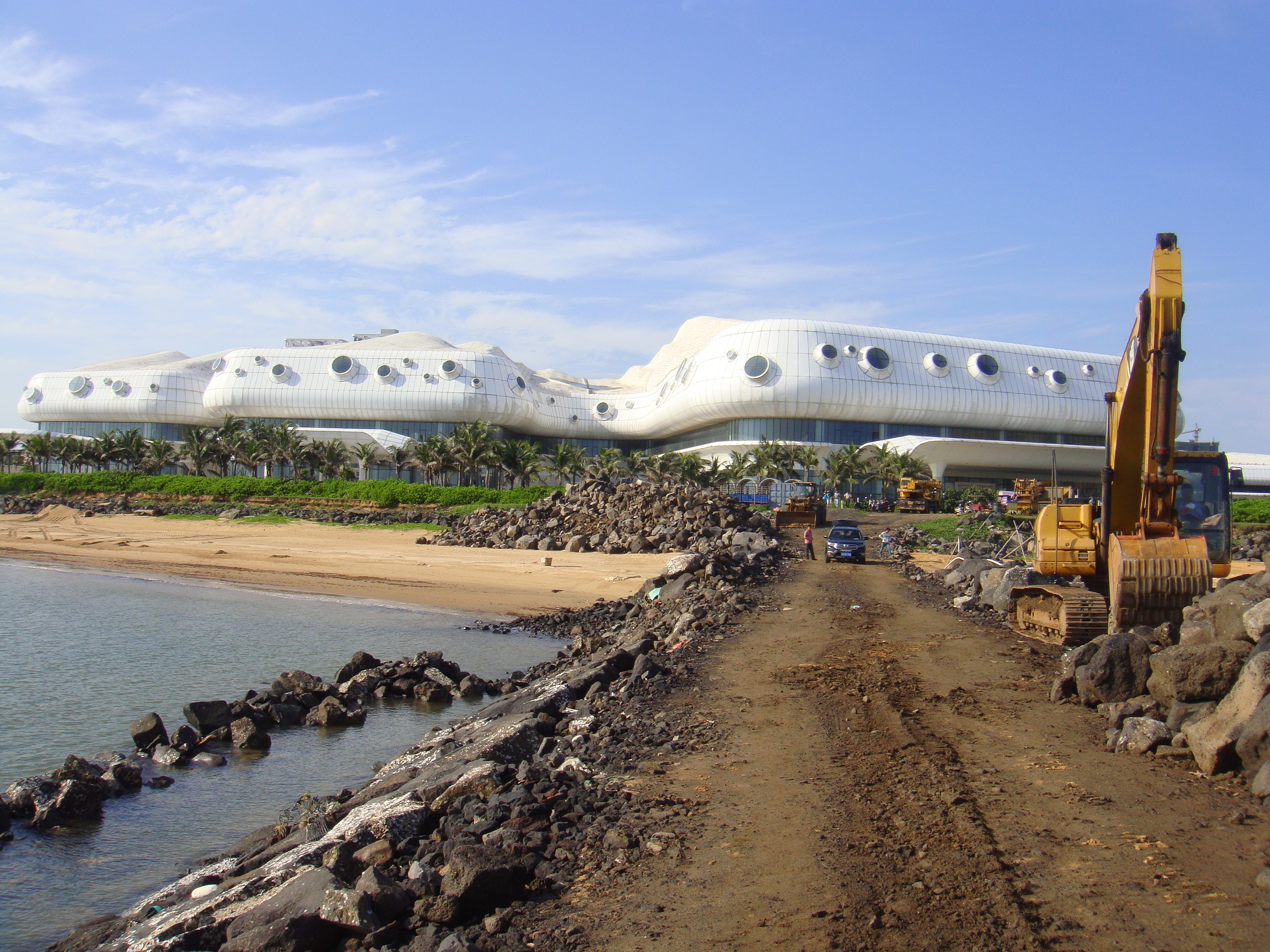
A view from the artificial island causeway
