= Belum Hasnain =

Pakistani politician

Member of the National Assembly of Pakistan
- In office 2002 – 31 May 2018
- Constituency: Reserved seat for women

Personal details
- Party: Pakistan Peoples Party

Belum Hasnain (Urdu: بیلم حسنین) is a Pakistani politician who had been a member of the National Assembly of Pakistan from 2002 to May 2018.

== Political career ==
She was elected to the National Assembly of Pakistan as a candidate of Pakistan Peoples Party from Punjab on a seat reserved for women in the 2002 Pakistani general election.

She was re-elected to the National Assembly of Pakistan as a candidate of Pakistan Peoples Party on a seat reserved for women from Punjab in the 2008 Pakistani general election.

She was re-elected to the National Assembly of Pakistan as a candidate of Pakistan Peoples Party on a seat reserved for women from Punjab in the 2013 Pakistani general election.
