= Hasnain Kazim =

German journalist (born 1974)

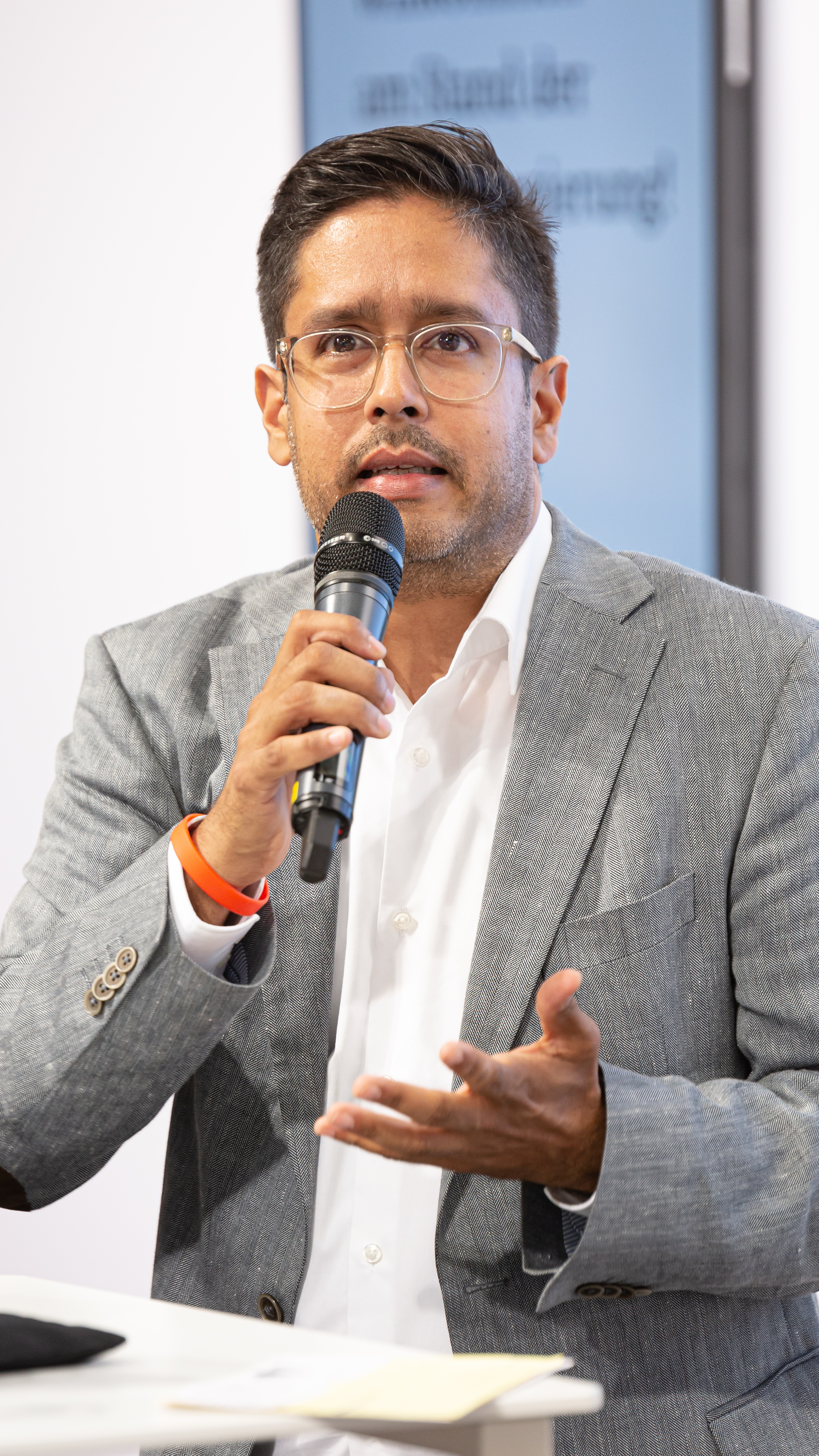
Hasnain Kazim in 2018 during the Frankfurt Book Fair

Hasnain Niels Kazim (born 1974) is a German journalist and writer of Pakistani origin. He is a winner of the CNN Journalist Award in 2009.

Kazim was born in Oldenburg, West Germany, to Pakistani parents whose families had migrated to Karachi from India during the independence of Pakistan in 1947. He became a naturalised German citizen at the age of 16. and joined the German Navy in 1994. He was honourably discharged as an officer in 2000.

From 2009 until 2013, he was the South Asia correspondent of German news magazine Der Spiegel based in Islamabad. Afterwards he was the magazine's Turkey correspondent based in Istanbul. The Turkish authorities declined to renew his press credentials and connected to that his legal residency, which forced him to leave the country in March 2016. He then relocated to Vienna but carried on reporting about Turkish affairs. In 2019, he left Der Spiegel and became a freelance author.
