= IBSF World Under-17 Snooker Championship =

The IBSF World Under-17 Snooker Championship (also known as the World Amateur Under-17 Snooker Championship) is a non-professional junior snooker tournament. The event series is sanctioned by the International Billiards and Snooker Federation and started from 2015 as an under-18 tournament.

The inaugural tournament was won by Ka Wai Cheung who defeated fellow countryman Ming Tung Chan 5–2 in the final. Yana Shut won the inaugural women's championship. The event was not held in 2020 or 2021 due to the COVID-19 pandemic.

== Winners ==
=== Men's ===
Year	Venue	Winner	Runner-up	Score
IBSF World Under-18 Snooker Championship
2015	St. Petersburg, Russia	Cheung Ka Wai (HKG)	Ming Tung Chan (HKG)	5–2
2016	Mol, Belgium	Jackson Page (WAL)	Yun Fung Tam (HKG)	5–4
2017	Beijing, China	Muhammad Naseem Akhtar (PAK)	Lei Peifan (CHN)	5–3
2018	Jinan, China	He Guoqiang (CHN)	Lei Peifan (CHN)	5–4
2019	Qingdao, China	Jiang Jun (CHN)	Gao Yang (CHN)	5–2
2022	Bucharest, Romania	Liam Davies (WAL)	Antoni Kowalski (POL)	4–3
IBSF World Under-17 Snooker Championship
2023	Riyadh, Saudi Arabia	Liam Davies (WAL)	Riley Powell (WAL)	4–0
2024	Bengaluru, India	Christian Richter (GER)	Lomnaw Issarangkun (THA)	4–1
2025	Manama, Bahrain]	Muhammad Hasnain Akhtar (PAK)	Riley Powell (WAL)	4–0

=== Women's ===
Year	Venue	Winner	Runner-up	Score
2015	St. Petersburg, Russia	Yana Shut (BLR)	Anastasija Singurindi (RUS)	3–0
2016	Mol, Belgium	Baipat Siripaporn (THA)	Mink Nutcharut (THA)	3–1
2017	Beijing, China	Mink Nutcharut (THA)	Baipat Siripaporn (THA)	3–2

== Medals ==
=== Men ===
Rank	Nation	Gold	Silver	Bronze	Total
1	Wales (WAL)	3	2	0	5
2	China (CHN)	2	3	0	5
3	Pakistan (PAK)	2	0	0	2
4	Hong Kong (HKG)	1	2	0	3
5	Germany (GER)	1	0	0	1
Totals (5 entries)		9	7	0	16

== See also ==
- World Snooker Tour
- IBSF World Snooker Championship
- IBSF World Under-21 Snooker Championship
- World Open Under-16 Snooker Championships
