= Ratchayothin Yotharuck =

Thai snooker player (born 1995)

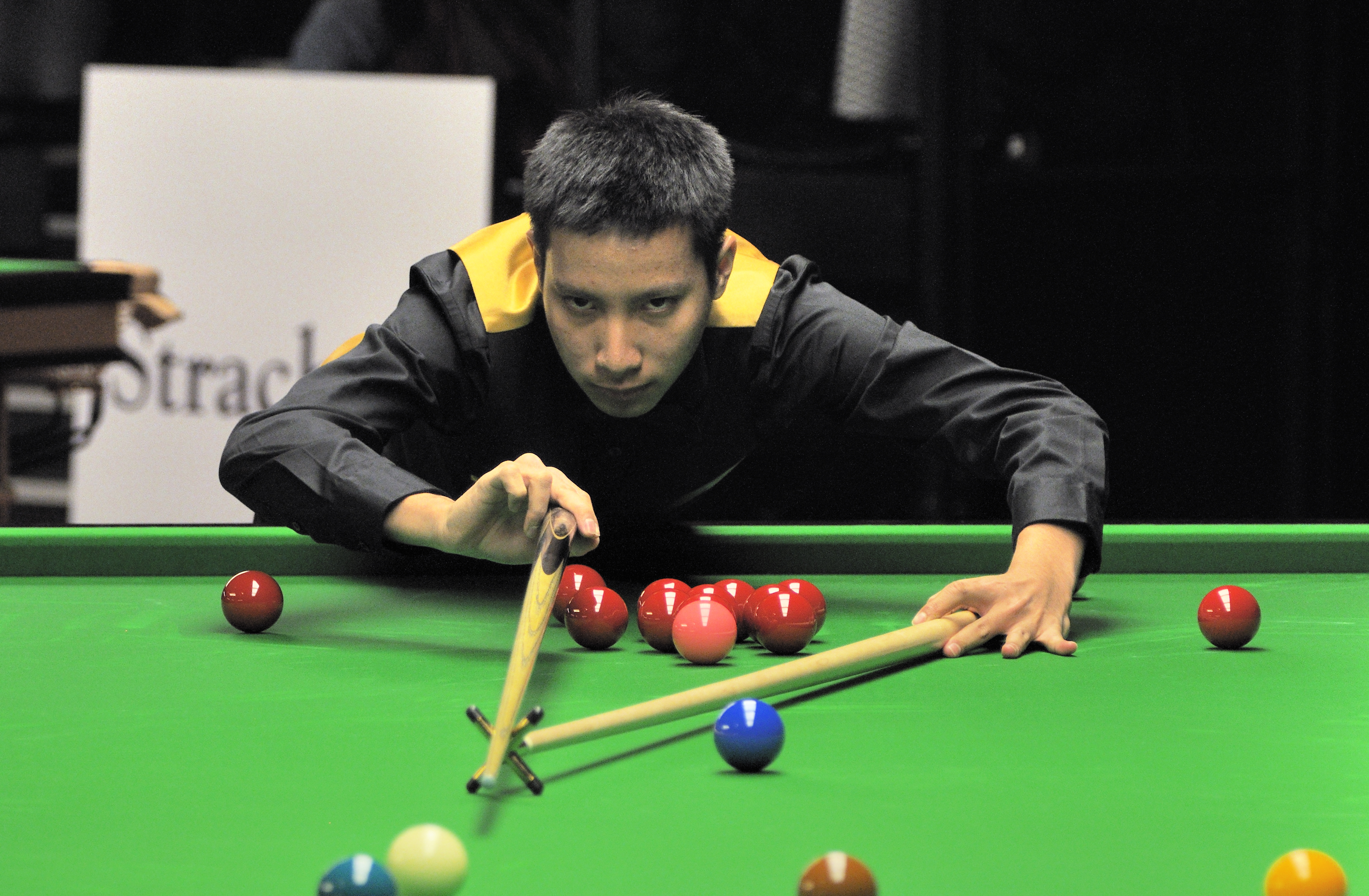
- German Masters 2014

Personal information
- Born: 13 December 1995 (age 30) Nakhon Nayok, Thailand

Sport
- Country: Thailand
- Sport: Snooker
- Professional: 2013–2015
- Highest ranking: 86 (September–October 2014)
- Best ranking finish: Last 32 (x1)
Medal record
Men's snooker
Representing Thailand
Southeast Asian Games
Silver medal – second place	2015 Singapore	Doubles

Ratchayothin Yotharuck (Thai: รัชโยธิน โยธารักษ์, born 13 December 1995 in Nakhon Nayok, Thailand) is a Thai former professional snooker player. Yotharuck has been playing snooker since he was 10 years old and represented Thailand in several international events together with Boonrayit Kiatkul and Noppon Saengkham. In 2013 he received a two-year wildcard for the Main Tour as an Asian Confederation of Billiard Sports nomination, after Asian champion Saleh Mohammad declined his place.

== Career ==
Having missed the first few events of the 2013–14 season, Yotharuck made his debut at the Rotterdam Open, where he lost 4–1 to Mitchell Travis in pre-qualifying. Yotharuck would lose all three of his first round matches in the ranking events, with the exception coming at the Indian Open. There he caused an upset by defeating former world champion Graeme Dott 4–2 in qualifying and went on to beat his famous compatriot James Wattana 4–3 at the venue, before being whitewashed in the last 32 match by Mike Dunn. He finished his debut season ranked world number 111.

Yotharuck lost nine of his ten matches during the 2014–15 season and has not played in an event since December 2014. He lost his place on the tour at the end of the season as he was the world number 110.

== Performance and rankings timeline ==
Tournament	2013/ 14	2014/ 15
Ranking (Note: It shows the ranking at the beginning of the season.)	(Note: New players don't have a ranking.)	111
Ranking tournaments
Wuxi Classic	A	WD
Australian Goldfields Open	A	WD
Shanghai Masters	LQ	LQ
International Championship	LQ	LQ
UK Championship	1R	1R
German Masters	1R	LQ
Welsh Open	1R	A
Indian Open	2R	A
Players Championship Grand Final	DNQ	DNQ
China Open	LQ	A
World Championship	LQ	A
Non-ranking tournaments
Six-red World Championship	2R	RR
Former ranking tournaments
World Open	LQ	NH

Performance Table Legend
LQ	lost in the qualifying draw	#R	lost in the early rounds of the tournament (WR = Wildcard round, RR = Round robin)	QF	lost in the quarter-finals
SF	lost in the semi-finals	F	lost in the final	W	won the tournament
DNQ	did not qualify for the tournament	A	did not participate in the tournament	WD	withdrew from the tournament

NH / Not Held	means an event was not held.
NR / Non-Ranking Event	means an event is/was no longer a ranking event.
R / Ranking Event	means an event is/was a ranking event.
MR / Minor-Ranking Event	means an event is/was a minor-ranking event.

== Career finals ==
=== Amateur finals: 1 ===
Outcome	No.	Year	Championship	Opponent in the final	Score
Winner	1.	2016	Asian Under-21 Snooker Championship	(China) Wang Yuchen	5–6
