= Hasnain Dewji =

Tanzanian politician (born 1957)

Honourable Hasnain Dewji MP

Member of Parliament for Kilwa South
- In office 2005–2010
- Preceded by: Omary Mwenda
- Succeeded by: Selemani Bungara

Personal details
- Born: 24 June 1957 (age 68)
- Party: CCM

Hasnain Gulamabbas Dewji (born 24 June 1957) is a Tanzanian politician who served as the Member of the Tanzanian Parliament for Kilwa South constituency from 2005 to 2010.
