= Ahsan Ramzan =

Pakistani snooker player

Personal information
- Born: 14 August 2005 (age 21) Lahore, Pakistan

Sport
- Country: Pakistan
- Sport: Snooker

Ahsan Ramzan is a Pakistani snooker player. In March 2022, Ramzan has set a new record for amateur snooker and become the 2nd youngest player after Chinese player Yan Bingtao at World Amateur Snooker Champion in the world. He represented Pakistan at the 2022 World Games held in Birmingham, United States.

== Career finals ==
=== Amateur finals: 5 (2 titles) ===
Outcome	No.	Year	Championship	Opponent in the final	Score
Runner-up	1.	2021	Pakistan Amateur Championship	(Pakistan) Muhammad Sajjad	6–7
Winner	1.	2022 (Note: Although it was held in 2022, this was the (postponed) championship for 2021)	World Amateur Championship	(Iran) Amir Sarkhosh	6–5
Winner	2.	2023	Asian Under-21 Championship	(Iran) Milad Pourali Darehchi	5–2
Runner-up	2.	2023	IBSF 6-Reds World Championship	(Cyprus) Michael Georgiou	4–6
Runner-up	3.	2024	Asian Under-21 Championship	(Pakistan) Muhammad Hasnain Akhtar	3–4
