= 2017–18 snooker world ranking points =

Preceded by 2016/2017	2017/2018	Succeeded by 2018/2019

The official 2017/2018 snooker world ranking points for the professional snooker players on the World Snooker Main Tour in the 2017–18 season are based on performances in ranking tournaments over a two-year rolling period. The rankings at the start of 2017/2018 season are determined by prize money earned in the 2015/2016 and 2016/2017 seasons and are updated after every tournament carrying ranking status; the players are re-ranked at the beginning of the current season after removing players relegated at the end of the previous season from the ranking list. As points are accrued from tournaments throughout the current season, the points from the corresponding tournaments from two seasons earlier are dropped. The rankings are used to set the official tournament seedings at various points throughout the season; even though the rankings are officially updated after every tournament carrying ranking status not all the rankings are used as seedings, and only the rankings officially used as seedings are documented below. The total points accumulated by the cut-off dates for the revised seedings are based on all the points up to that date in the 2017/2018 season, all of the points from the 2016/2017 season, and the points from the 2015/2016 season that have not yet been dropped.

== Seeding revisions ==
Cut-off point	Date	After	2015/2016 points dropped
1	26 June 2017	Riga Masters	ET (1)
2	17 September 2017	Indian Open	Australian Goldfields Open; ET (2)
3	25 September 2017	World Open	Shanghai Masters
4	9 October 2017	European Masters	AT (1)
5	6 November 2017	International Championship	International Championship; ET (3)
6	27 November 2017	Northern Ireland Open	ET (4)
7	11 December 2017	UK Championship	UK Championship
8	18 December 2017	Scottish Open	ET (5)
9	12 February 2018	Snooker Shoot Out	German Masters
10	9 April 2018	China Open	Welsh Open, World Grand Prix, China Open; ET (6), PTC (Finals)
Total	8 May 2018	World Championship	World Championship

== Ranking points ==
No.	Ch (Note: "Ch" = Change since the beginning of the 2017/2018 season. See for the player rankings at the start of the season.)	Player	Season (Note: The 2015/2016 points only include the ranking points that count towards the next seedings update. All new players or players regaining a place on the tour started on 0 points.)		Tournament (Note: Under World Snooker's rules players are not generally awarded points if they qualify for an event and then withdraw. However, World Snooker's appeals committee reserves the right to award points at their discretion and occasionally the finalised ranking list published after the tournament is inconsistent with the provisional list updated by the WPBSA during the tournament, in the event that discretionary points have been awarded. In such instances this table might include points not documented on the WPBSA's provisional list, which have been factored into the table so the overall totals and rankings match those on the finalised ranking list.)																				Season	Cut-off point (Note: See for the rankings at the first seedings cut-off point; see for the second; see for the third; see for the fourth; see for the fifth; see for the sixth; see for the seventh; see for the eighth; see for the ninth; for the tenth.)										Total
No.	Ch	Player	15/16	16/17	RM	CC	PHC	IO	WO	EUM	ENO	IC	SM	NIO	UK	SCO	GM	SSO	WGP	WEO	GO	PC	CO	WC	17/18	1	2	3	4	5	6	7	8	9	10	Total
1	Steady	(England) Mark Selby	0	859550		7000	1725		4000	11000	3500	150000	12000		5000		4000		20000	2500		10000	225000	0	455725	1297525	1299725	1303725	1314725	1436500	1445500	1420500	1418775	1419025	1645275	1315275
2	▲12	(England) Ronnie O'Sullivan	0	212750		18000					70000	4000	150000	3500	170000	10000	0		100000	10000		125000	5000	27500	693000	298750	316750	316750	316750	390750	544250	714250	724250	722750	900250	905750
3	▲13	(Wales) Mark Williams	0	129250	15000	18000			18000	11000	3500	13500	18000	70000	10000	0	80000	2000	5000	3500		30000	27000	425000	749500	225250	240250	246250	257250	264250	347750	353750	353750	432750	486750	878750
4	▼2	(Scotland) John Higgins	0	302025		7000		50000	12000	4000	6000	21500	32000	3500	15000	20000			7500	70000		10000	11000	180000	449500	563000	581600	585600	588300	490800	524575	519575	539050	537550	604525	751525
5	▼2	(England) Judd Trump	0	345750		7000			0	75000	6000	21500	75000	0	10000	20000	20000		5000	2500		30000	0	42500	314500	536275	531775	496775	571775	599275	671275	672275	691750	704250	639750	660250
6	▼2	(China) Ding Junhui	0	295525		7000			150000		2500	4000			0	3500	10000		40000	2500		15000	18000	42500	295000	510950	517950	655950	642450	641950	641950	641950	644925	653425	685525	590525
7	▼1	(England) Barry Hawkins	0	290725	1000	7000			4000	0	2500	4000	12000	0	10000	0	4000	2000		30000	1000		90000	85000	252500	377500	383975	387975	387975	384475	396475	402475	402475	404725	491225	543225
8	Steady	(England) Shaun Murphy	0	176875	0	75000	10000	6000	4000	0	6000	13500	0	0	75000	0	20000	0	12500	0		50000	5000	0	277000	355625	437625	433625	433625	439400	436400	499400	499400	516400	453875	453875
9	▲4	(England) Kyren Wilson	0	126525	4000	0	1725	0	75000	2000	30000	8500	0	0	10000	3500	0	0	5000	6000	4000	10000	45000	85000	289725	305400	304400	294400	296400	327375	326475	327475	329250	314250	364250	416250
10	▼3	(Australia) Neil Robertson	0	154125	1000	4000			12000	6000	10000	13500	0	3500	10000	70000	2000		7500	2500		15000	45000	0	202000	359125	363125	375125	381125	387125	390625	250625	320625	322625	356125	356125
11	▲1	(England) Ali Carter	0	209525		32000		0		0	2500	21500	7000	2500	0	2500	0	1000	5000	2500			5000	42500	124000	301675	308925	308925	308925	328025	337525	328525	331025	329025	313025	333525
12	▼2	(Northern Ireland) Mark Allen	0	89450	0	4000		6000	32000	11000	2500	75000	12000	2500	15000	0	4000	0	5000	3500		10000	18000	42500	243000	305925	315925	328425	339425	397700	393450	399450	399450	400450	311950	332450
13	▼4	(England) Stuart Bingham (Note: On 11 October 2017 Stuart Bingham was given a six month ban from the World Snooker Tour, due to betting breaches. The suspension is effective from 28 October 2017 until 26 January 2018, with the remainder of the disqualification period suspended until 31 October 2018, which will not be enforced provided Bingham fully complies with his gambling addiction programme.)	0	224087	1000	4000	0	6000	7000	35000	3500							2000	7500	3500	4000		27000	0	100500	313862	323862	311362	346362	345862	345337	336337	331837	330087	324587	324587
14	▲3	(Scotland) Anthony McGill	0	155800	6000	4000		25000	18000	11000	20000	4000	0	3500	5000	2500	0	0	12500	2500	3000	15000	5000	27500	164500	205250	234250	252250	263250	279350	282325	283325	285300	283800	314800	320300
15	▲12	(Belgium) Luca Brecel	0	55050	2000	150000	600	2000	32000	6000	2500	8500	18000		10000		0	1000	5000	2500	0	10000	5000	0	255100	133175	284875	310875	316875	322150	339625	337625	335900	310650	316750	310150
16	▲3	(Wales) Ryan Day	0	111362	50000	7000			7000	2000	0	8500	4000	6000	35000	0	10000	0	5000	0	25000	15000	0	18000	192500	244087	250562	249562	251562	247537	248537	279537	278637	281137	299112	303862
17	▲7	(Scotland) Stephen Maguire	0	121525	25000	12000		2000	7000	0	0	8500	12000	2500	35000	10000	0		20000	2500		10000	5000	18000	169500	202375	205850	212850	212850	220450	234950	257950	267425	259925	273025	291025
18	▼13	(Hong Kong) Marco Fu	0	240150		7000			7000		0	0	12000		10000	6000								0	42000	393625	399725	406725	405425	387400	399400	389400	376650	373650	348150	282150
19	▼8	(China) Liang Wenbo	0	179400		0			4000		3500	13500	12000	2500	10000	2500	5000			6000	2000		5000	13500	79500	302500	301975	299975	298675	308675	322650	262650	260650	262650	258650	258900
20	▲2	(England) Joe Perry	0	102450	6000	4000		4000	12000	4000	0	8500	7000	6000	22500	2500	5000	4000	7500	0	4000		11000	27500	135500	187175	186150	198150	202150	192250	204350	222850	225350	232850	210450	237950
21	▼1	(England) Mark King	0	135325	1000	4000	1725	15000	4000	2000	0	8500	4000	3500	22500	0	2000	500	5000	0	1000		11000	0	85725	191575	203300	205300	206000	213600	220200	242700	239700	238450	230950	221050
22	▲8	(Scotland) Graeme Dott	0	59675	0	12000		4000	4000	4000	0	4000	12000	0	15000	0	35000	16000	5000	2500		10000	18000	18000	159500	123375	138475	142475	146475	137950	149950	160950	160425	196425	214425	219175
23	▲33	(China) Yan Bingtao	0	71125	0	7000		2000		2000	6000	32000	4000	30000	10000	3500	0	0	7500	10000		10000	11000	9000	144000	71125	80125	80125	82125	120125	154125	164125	167625	167625	206125	215125
24	▼9	(England) Martin Gould	0	70550	0	12000	0	0	7000	2000	0	32000	18000		22500	0	4000	1000	5000	6000			5000	9000	123500	210975	206075	201075	203075	231075	248550	251050	251050	196050	185050	194050
25	▲14	(China) Xiao Guodong	0	80025	1000	4000		0	7000	0	6000	8500	4000	3500	15000	10000	10000	500	12500	0			11000	18000	111000	102775	106250	113250	111950	122450	129425	140425	150425	159425	182925	191025
26	▲28	(England) Jack Lisowski	0	28762	4000	0	600	2000	4000	6000	10000	13500	32000	2500	5000	0	4000	0	7500	3500	3000		27000	27500	152100	77637	75212	77212	83212	99187	133162	129162	129162	131662	163262	180862
27	▼9	(England) David Gilbert	0	81550	1000	7000	1000	10000	18000	6000	2500	4000	7000	6000	5000	0	4000	500	5000	0			11000	9000	97000	195125	212225	228225	234225	171225	183700	179700	179700	184200	182800	178550
28	▼7	(England) Ricky Walden	0	70375	0	0	600	6000	7000	0	2500	8500	0	6000	15000	10000	5000	1000	5000	2500	0		11000	27500	107600	186500	187100	194100	187600	198600	203700	214700	222975	228975	172475	177975
29	▼3	(Wales) Michael White	0	77125	1000	7000	20000		0	0	10000	0	7000	0	10000	6000	0	500	12500	0	0		11000	13500	98500	135100	153075	153075	153075	150550	157025	167025	164025	163025	162125	175625
30	▼5	(England) Anthony Hamilton	0	142925	0	7000		2000	0	2000	0		0	0	0	0	4000	0		2500	1000		5000	0	23500	142925	151925	151925	153925	153925	153925	153925	153925	157925	166425	166425
31	▼8	(England) Michael Holt	0	96550	0	4000	0	6000	7000	2000	0	4000	4000	3500	5000	3500	0	500		2500			11000	13500	66500	177600	177100	176100	178100	174575	180350	176350	179325	176075	171550	163050
32	▼1	(England) Tom Ford	0	65050	1000	12000	1725	2000	4000	0	2500	8500	4000	2500	5000	6000	4000	2000		2500	1000		27000	9000	94725	114500	130225	128225	127425	133900	139500	132500	137600	143600	157375	159775
33	▼2	(China) Zhou Yuelong	0	80950	1000	18000		2000		17500		0	7000	2500	0	3500	0	0		0	0		18000	9000	78500	119325	137800	137300	154000	142000	150600	146600	149575	148075	160350	159450
34	▲4	(England) Jimmy Robertson	0	56587	1000	4000	0	2000	12000	0	3500	8500	7000	3500	10000	2500	10000	0	5000	0	0		5000	18000	92000	106487	110762	122762	119262	118737	127512	133512	136012	144512	140487	148587
35	▼1	(England) Robert Milkins	0	58525	2000	4000	0	2000	7000	0	3500	13500	7000	10000	5000	2500	0	500	5000	0	0		0	27500	89500	110575	110575	111575	108075	124175	140275	141275	143775	144275	133775	148025
36	▲22	(China) Li Hang	0	37450	0	32000		2000	18000	0	2500	8500	0	2500	15000	3500	0	0	5000		1000		0	9000	99000	68075	100675	115675	114875	124975	127475	133475	136450	134950	134050	136450
37	▼9	(England) Ben Woollaston	0	58275	1000	4000	3000	4000	7000	6000	3500	4000	7000	2500	5000	2500	4000	0		3500	0		11000	9000	77000	127025	133525	140525	144775	138550	148050	144050	146025	146275	126275	135275
38	▲51	(China) Cao Yupeng	0	6525	1000	4000		2000	12000	17500	2500	4000	7000	0	5000	30000	2000	4000	5000	0	12000		18000	0	126000	7525	13525	25525	43025	49525	56525	61525	91525	97525	132525	132525
39	▼4	(Wales) Jamie Jones	0	65087	1000	0	4500	0	4000	2000	2500	0	7000	0	5000	2500	2000	2000		2500	0		0	27500	62500	109462	103437	101437	103437	98412	104887	100887	102487	104987	100087	127587
40	▲17	(England) Gary Wilson	0	49387	1000	0	3000	4000	4000	0	2500	4000	4000	6000	0	2500	5000	500		20000	1000		18000	0	75500	69337	76337	80337	79937	85912	95012	91012	92987	98487	131487	124887
41	▼5	(England) Mark Davis	0	62500	4000	12000		2000	0	6000	2500	0	4000	0	0	0	5000	8000		0	0		5000	13500	62000	111250	123525	111525	117525	117025	121025	112025	111125	124125	117600	124500
42	▲6	(England) Mark Joyce	0	38337	6000	7000	3000	0	4000	0	2500	13500	4000	0	22500	3500	5000	0	7500	0	0		5000	0	83500	89662	93662	95662	95662	107662	109937	123437	126937	124437	128437	121837
43	▲4	(China) Yu Delu	0	61625		0	600	4000	4000	0	0	4000	7000	2500	5000	2500	4000			10000	3000		0	9000	55600	84175	88775	92775	92775	89250	98750	99750	101725	104225	108225	117225
44	▲8	(Norway) Kurt Maflin	0	51237	2000	7000	600	4000	0	0	0	4000	18000	2500	10000	0	0	0		2500	1000		5000	9000	65600	77687	88762	88762	87962	87062	107037	117037	116512	112762	117737	116837
45	▲14	(Iran) Hossein Vafaei	0	52000	2000	4000		6000	4000	2000	10000	4000	4000	2500	10000	0	0			0				13500	62000	67625	73125	75125	77125	91125	97625	107625	107100	107100	107100	114000
46	▼13	(Wales) Dominic Dale	0	68625	0	0	1000	4000	4000	2000	0	8500	4000	0	5000	2500	0	0		2500	2000		0	9000	44500	116325	120800	121800	122500	122275	124550	125550	125050	125050	114025	113125
47	▲8	(Wales) Matthew Stevens	0	46587	1000	12000	1000	0	4000	0	3500	0	4000	2500	0	0	2000	1000		6000	1000		5000	18000	61000	72887	84987	86987	86987	86487	92987	92987	92987	94487	99487	107587
48	▲15	(England) Chris Wakelin	0	39575	0	4000	1725	0	7000	4000	0	0	4000	6000	5000	2500	0	0		3500	0		11000	18000	66725	60750	64950	71950	75950	71425	81425	82425	84400	84400	94900	106300
49	▲25	(Cyprus) Michael Georgiou	0	23237	1000	4000	1000	0	4000	4000	0	0	4000	2500	5000	0	4000	32000	7500	2500	2000		0	9000	82500	24237	29237	33237	37237	37237	43737	48737	48737	84737	96737	105737
50	▼4	(England) Stuart Carrington	0	59075	1000	4000	1000			0	3500	0	4000	2500	0	3500	2000	2000		2500	1000		0	18000	45000	85450	87450	87450	87450	90425	95200	91200	94700	95700	92675	104075
51	▼6	(Republic of Ireland) Fergal O'Brien	0	57887	0	18000	600	4000	0	0	0	0	7000	0	0	0	4000	500		0	0		11000	0	45100	91537	108137	108137	108137	100612	105887	101887	100987	102487	109587	102987
52	▲12	(Thailand) Noppon Saengkham	0	36550	2000	4000	600	0	4000	2000	0	0	0	3500	10000	3500	0	500		20000	2000		5000	9000	66100	62050	66650	70650	72250	68250	71750	81750	85250	85750	100250	102650
53	▼10	(England) Mike Dunn	0	36025	0	12000	1000	2000	4000	0	2500	0	0	10000	5000	2500	2000	1000		6000	0		5000	13500	66500	93500	107975	103975	103975	97975	104975	105975	107950	109450	98925	102525
54	▼5	(England) Andrew Higginson	0	47925	6000	4000	600	2000	4000	0	6000	4000	0	0	5000	0	2000	0		2500	0		5000	13500	54600	84675	85875	86875	86875	91150	90250	95250	93525	94025	89025	102525
55	▼15	(England) Peter Ebdon	0	42712	1000	4000	1000	0	12000	4000	0	4000	0	0	5000	3500	2000	500		3500	0		5000	13500	59000	99487	103962	109962	113962	109237	108712	101712	103487	104487	101462	101712
56	▼14	(Thailand) Thepchaiya Un-Nooh	0	32500	2000	7000		0	12000	4000	2500	0	0	3500	5000	0	4000			2500			5000	18000	65500	97675	104675	116675	118925	91425	94925	90925	90925	94925	89900	98000
57	▼4	(England) Robbie Williams	0	38725	4000	0	600	0	0	0	0	21500	7000	0	5000	0	2000			3500	1000		5000	9000	58600	78125	76500	74500	74500	91475	98475	94475	93575	94075	101575	97325
58	▲7	(Scotland) Scott Donaldson	0	59525	0	0	0	0	0	0	0	0	0	0	10000	2500	0	500		2500	6000		5000	9000	35500	59525	59525	59525	59525	59525	59525	69525	72025	72525	86025	95025
59	▼22	(England) Matthew Selt	0	37900	0	4000	0	4000	7000	2000	2500	8500	4000	2500	5000	0	5000	500		0	3000		0	9000	57000	107000	105975	104975	106975	113450	119425	104425	103900	109400	92500	94900
60	▲8	(England) Liam Highfield	0	35225			600	10000	0	0	3500	0	0	6000	5000	2500	2000	500		6000	0		5000	18000	59100	35225	45825	45825	45825	49325	55325	60325	62825	65325	76325	94325
61	New entry	(China) Lyu Haotian	0	0	0	0		0		4000	2500	0	4000	20000	15000	0	0	500		2500			18000	27500	94000	0	0	0	4000	6500	30500	45500	45500	46000	66500	94000
62	▼21	(England) Rory McLeod	0	48387	0	4000	0	4000	0	0	0	4000	4000	0	0	6000	2000	0		2500	1000		0	13500	41000	95962	103462	100462	100462	85712	89712	89712	95712	94712	82487	89387
63	▼2	(Wales) Daniel Wells	0	49212	0	4000	0	2000	7000	0	2500	0	4000	0	0	3500	0	0		2500	1000		0	13500	40000	63512	68362	75362	75362	73337	75612	71612	74212	74212	75712	89212
64	▼35	(Scotland) Alan McManus	0	30900	1000	12000	1000	2000	0	4000	0	4000	7000	0	5000	2500	4000	0		0			0	13500	56000	126850	141325	135325	139325	140325	146425	147425	149400	150400	139400	86900
65	▼3	(England) Oliver Lines	0	41812	2000	4000	0	0	4000	2000	0	8500	0	2500	5000	0	0	0		2500	2000		0	9000	41500	65062	68562	72562	74562	75537	77137	78137	76412	76412	80912	83312
66	Steady	(England) John Astley	0	39125	2000	0	600	2000	7000	2000	2500	4000	4000	0	0	0	2000	500		6000	1000		0	9000	42600	41125	43725	50725	52725	59225	63225	63225	63225	65725	72725	81725
67	Steady	(China) Zhang Anda	0	38500	4000	0		10000	4000	0	1250	0	0	0	0	3500	0	0		0	1000		0	13500	37250	42500	52500	56500	56500	57750	57750	57750	61250	61250	62250	75750
68	▲17	(England) Elliot Slessor	0	9362	1000	4000	0	10000	4000	0	0	0	0	20000	0	6000	0	1000		0	0		11000	9000	66000	10362	24362	28362	28362	28362	48362	48362	54362	55362	66362	75362
69	Steady	(Wales) Lee Walker	0	33825	1000	0	0	0	12000	0	0	4000	4000	0	0	0	0	0		0	6000		5000	9000	41000	34825	34825	46825	46825	50825	54825	54825	54825	54825	65825	74825
70	▼20	(China) Tian Pengfei	0	26075	2000	4000		4000	4000	0	2500	4000	0	10000	0	0	0	1000		0	3000		0	13500	48000	79575	86675	87675	86375	71875	81875	77875	76975	74975	60575	74075
71	▼27	(England) David Grace	0	39125	0	7000	600	0	0	0	0	4000	0	0	0	6000	2000	0		3500	1000		0	9000	33100	93475	100825	92825	92825	96825	96825	66825	69825	71825	69825	72225
72	▼12	(England) Alfie Burden	0	34250	0	4000	600	2000	4000	4000	0	0	4000	0	0	2500	0	0		0	3000		0	13500	37600	63825	69525	73525	77525	77000	80475	80475	79975	76975	64950	71850
73	▼3	(China) Mei Xiwen	0	32212	0	0		0	0	2000	0	4000	12000	3500	0	2500	5000	500		0	1000		0	9000	39500	32212	32212	32212	34212	38212	53712	53712	56212	61712	62712	71712
74	▼23	(England) Sam Baird	0	36250	4000	4000	600	4000	0	2000	0	0	0	0	0	0	0	0		0	0		5000	9000	28600	80025	88125	88125	90125	89600	85100	85100	84575	84575	77850	64850
75	New entry	(Republic of Ireland) Ken Doherty	0	0	15000	4000	1000	6000	4000	4000	0			3500	5000	0	2000	0		0	3000		0	13500	61000	15000	26000	30000	34000	34000	37500	42500	42500	44500	47500	61000
76	New entry	(Thailand) Sunny Akani	0	0				6000	0	0	3500	8500	7000	3500	15000	0	0	4000		3500			0	9000	60000	0	6000	6000	6000	18000	28500	43500	43500	47500	51000	60000
77	▼5	(China) Zhao Xintong	0	23537	0	0	1725	2000	0	2000	2500	4000	0	2500	5000	0	2000	0		0	2000		0	9000	32725	23537	27262	27262	29262	35762	38262	43262	43262	45262	47262	56262
78	▼7	(England) Hammad Miah	0	25837	2000	0	0	2000	0	0	3500	0	0	0	5000	2500	4000	0		0	1000		0	9000	29000	27837	29837	29837	29837	33337	33337	38337	40837	44837	45837	54837
79	▼4	(England) Mitchell Mann	0	22025	0	0	4500	0	0	2000	2500	0	4000	0	5000	2500	2000	0		0	1000		0	9000	32500	22025	26525	26525	28525	31025	35025	40025	42525	44525	45525	54525
80	▼4	(England) Sam Craigie	0	18862	2000	0	600	0	4000	0	0	4000	0	6000	0	2500	0			3500	2000		11000	0	35600	20862	21462	25462	25462	29462	35462	35462	37962	37962	54462	54462
81	New entry	(England) Martin O'Donnell	0	0	0	0	600	4000	0	4000	0	13500	0		0	0	0	8000		0	2000		5000	9000	46100	0	4600	4600	8600	22100	22100	22100	22100	30100	37100	46100
82	▼5	(Wales) Jak Jones	0	18862	0	0	600	0	0	2000	0	0	0	2500	5000	0	0	500		2500	1000		11000	0	25100	18862	19462	19462	21462	21462	23962	28962	28962	29462	43962	43962
83	▼5	(India) Aditya Mehta	0	17500	0	4000	600	0	0	4000	6000	0	0	0	5000	0	2000			2500	2000		0	0	26100	17500	22100	22100	26100	32100	32100	37100	37100	39100	43600	43600
84	▼5	(Wales) Ian Preece	0	17000	0	4000	600	2000	0	2000	2500	4000	4000	0	0	0	0	500		2500	0		0	0	22100	17000	23600	23600	25600	32100	36100	36100	36100	36600	39100	39100
85	New entry	(Northern Ireland) Gerard Greene	0	0	1000	0	0	4000	0	4000	2500	0	7000	0	0	3500	0	2000		3500	0		0	9000	36500	1000	5000	5000	9000	11500	18500	18500	22000	24000	27500	36500
86	▼13	(Thailand) James Wattana	0	23500				0	0	0	6000	0	0	0	0	0		500		3500			0	0	10000	23500	23500	23500	23500	29500	29500	29500	29500	30000	33500	33500
87	▼1	(England) Adam Duffy	0	9362	0	0	0	2000	0	2000	0	0	4000	2500	0	0	0	0		0	0		0	13500	24000	9362	11362	11362	13362	13362	19862	19862	19862	19862	19862	33362
88	New entry	(Switzerland) Alexander Ursenbacher	0	0	2000	0	600	4000	4000	2000	20000	0	0	0	0	0	0	500		0			0	0	33100	2000	6600	10600	12600	32600	32600	32600	32600	33100	33100	33100
89	▼7	(England) Craig Steadman	0	14050	2000	0	1000	0	0	0	2500	0	0	0	0	3500	0	0		3500	1000		5000	0	18500	16050	17050	17050	17050	19550	19550	19550	23050	23050	32550	32550
90	▼10	(China) Fang Xiongman	0	15550	0	0	600	0	0	2000	2500	0	0	2500	0	2500	0	0		3500	3000		0	0	16600	15550	16150	16150	18150	20650	23150	23150	25650	25650	32150	32150
91	New entry	(China) Xu Si	0	0	0	0	0	15000	0	0	0	0	0	0	5000	6000	0	0		3500	0		0	0	29500	0	15000	15000	15000	15000	15000	20000	26000	26000	29500	29500
92	New entry	(China) Yuan Sijun	0	0	0	0		0	0	2000	3500	0	4000	2500	0	0	2000	0		0	0		5000	9000	28000	0	0	0	2000	5500	12000	12000	12000	14000	19000	28000
93	New entry	(England) Jimmy White	0	0	4000	0	0	0	0	0	0	0	0	3500	5000	2500	2000	500		0	1000		0	9000	27500	4000	4000	4000	4000	4000	7500	12500	15000	17500	18500	27500
94	▼13	(China) Wang Yuchen	0	15500	1000	0	0	2000	0	0	0	0	4000	2500	0	0	2000	0		0			0	0	11500	16500	18500	18500	18500	18500	25000	25000	25000	27000	27000	27000
95	New entry	(England) Ian Burns	0	0	0	4000	3000	0	4000	0	0	4000	0	0	0	0	2000	0		10000	0		0	0	27000	0	7000	11000	11000	15000	15000	15000	15000	17000	27000	27000
96	New entry	(China) Zhang Yong	0	0	0		0	0	0	2000	3500	8500	0	2500	0	2500	0	4000		0	4000		0	0	27000	0	0	0	2000	14000	16500	16500	19000	23000	27000	27000
97	New entry	(England) Peter Lines	0	0	0	0	1725	0	0	6000	0	0	0	0	10000	3500	2000	500		0	0		0	0	23725	0	1725	1725	7725	7725	7725	17725	21225	23725	23725	23725
98	New entry	(China) Li Yuan	0	0			0	0	0	2000	2500	4000	4000	10000	0	0	0	0		0	0		0	0	22500	0	0	0	2000	8500	22500	22500	22500	22500	22500	22500
99	New entry	(Finland) Robin Hull	0	0	2000	0	0	2000	0	0	0	4000	0	3500	0	0	2000						0	9000	22500	2000	4000	4000	4000	8000	11500	11500	11500	13500	13500	22500
100	New entry	(England) Allan Taylor	0	0	0	7000	0	0	7000	0	1250	0	0	0	0	2500	0	1000		0	2000		0	0	20750	0	7000	14000	14000	15250	15250	15250	17750	18750	20750	20750
101	▼17	(Malaysia) Thor Chuan Leong	0	11900	0	0		0	0	2000	3500	0	0	0	0	0	2000	0		0	1000		0	0	8500	11900	11900	11900	13900	17400	17400	17400	17400	19400	20400	20400
102	New entry	(Wales) Duane Jones	0	0	0	0		2000	4000	0	0	0	0	2500	0	0	0	500		0	0		11000	0	20000	0	2000	6000	6000	6000	8500	8500	8500	9000	20000	20000
103	▼20	(Malta) Alex Borg	0	13000	1000	0	600	0	0	0	0	0	0	2500	0	0	0	1000		0	0		0	0	5100	14000	14600	14600	14600	14600	17100	17100	17100	18100	18100	18100
104	New entry	(England) Nigel Bond	0	0	2000	0	600	0	0	0	0	0	0	0	0	0	2000	2000		6000	0		5000	0	17600	2000	2600	2600	2600	2600	2600	2600	2600	6600	17600	17600
105	New entry	(China) Chen Zifan	0	0	1000	4000		0	0	4000	3500	0	0	2500	0	0	0	0		2500	0		0	0	17500	1000	5000	5000	9000	12500	15000	15000	15000	15000	17500	17500
106	▼13	(China) Chen Zhe	0	3500	0	0		0	7000	2000	0	0	0	0	0	0	0	0		0	0		5000	0	14000	3500	3500	10500	12500	12500	12500	12500	12500	12500	17500	17500
107	New entry	(England) Ashley Hugill	0	0	0	0	0	2000	0	0	2500	0	0	2500	0	6000	2000	1000		0	0		0	0	16000	0	2000	2000	2000	4500	7000	7000	13000	16000	16000	16000
108	New entry	(China) Niu Zhuang	0	0		0		2000	0	0	0	4000	0	2500	0	2500	4000	0		0	1000		0	0	16000	0	2000	2000	2000	6000	8500	8500	11000	15000	16000	16000
109	New entry	(Scotland) Chris Totten	0	0	0	0	0	0	0	0	0	0	4000	0	0	3500	2000	0		0	0		5000	0	14500	0	0	0	0	0	4000	4000	7500	9500	14500	14500
110	New entry	(Scotland) Eden Sharav	0	0	1000	0	0	0	4000	2000	0	4000	0	0	0	2500	0	0		0	0		0	0	13500	1000	1000	5000	7000	11000	11000	11000	13500	13500	13500	13500
111	▼24	(Republic of Ireland) Josh Boileau	0	8312	0	0	0	2000	0	0	0	0	0	0	0	0	2000	500		0			0	0	4500	8312	10312	10312	10312	10312	10312	10312	10312	12812	12812	12812
112	New entry	(Iran) Soheil Vahedi	0	0	0	0		2000	0	2000	0	0	4000	0	0	0	0	0		2500	2000		0	0	12500	0	2000	2000	4000	4000	8000	8000	8000	8000	12500	12500
113	New entry	(England) Paul Davison	0	0	4000	0	1000	0	0	0	0	0	0	2500	0	0	0	0		0	0		5000	0	12500	4000	5000	5000	5000	5000	7500	7500	7500	7500	12500	12500
114	New entry	(England) Billy Joe Castle	0	0	0	0	0	0	0	6000	0	0	2000	2500	0	0	0	1000		0	0		0	0	11500	0	0	0	6000	6000	10500	10500	10500	11500	11500	11500
115	▼23	(England) Jamie Curtis-Barrett	0	3500	1000	0	600	0	0	0	0	0	0	2500	0	2500	0	0		0	1000		0	0	7600	4500	5100	5100	5100	5100	7600	7600	10100	10100	11100	11100
116	New entry	(Pakistan) Hamza Akbar	0	0	0	0					0	0	0	0	0	2500	2000	1000		0	0		5000	0	10500	0	0	0	0	0	0	0	2500	5500	10500	10500
117	▼23	(Australia) Kurt Dunham	0	3025	0	0	0	0	0	0	0	0	0	0	0	2500	0	1000		2500	1000		0	0	7000	3025	3025	3025	3025	3025	3025	3025	5525	6525	10025	10025
118	New entry	(Scotland) Ross Muir	0	0	0	0	0	0	0	4000	2500	0	0	3500	0	0	0	0		0	0		0	0	10000	0	0	0	4000	6500	10000	10000	10000	10000	10000	10000
119	▼29	(England) Christopher Keogan	0	5050	1000	0	0	0	0	0	0	0	0	0	0	2500	0	0		0	0		0	0	3500	6050	6050	6050	6050	6050	6050	6050	8550	8550	8550	8550
120	New entry	(Northern Ireland) Joe Swail	0	0		0	1000	0	0	2000	2500	0	0	0	0	2500	0	500					0	0	8500	0	1000	1000	3000	5500	5500	5500	8000	8500	8500	8500
121	▼33	(Thailand) Kritsanut Lertsattayathorn	0	8000					0																0	8000	8000	8000	8000	8000	8000	8000	8000	8000	8000	8000
122	New entry	(England) Sanderson Lam	0	0	0	0	0	0	0	0	0	4000	4000	0	0	0	0	0		0	0		0	0	8000	0	0	0	0	4000	8000	8000	8000	8000	8000	8000
123	▼32	(Thailand) Boonyarit Keattikun	0	4000				2000	0	0	0	0	0		0	0	0								2000	4000	6000	6000	6000	6000	6000	6000	6000	6000	6000	6000
124	New entry	(England) Sean O'Sullivan	0	0	0	0	0	4000	0	0	0	0	0	0	0	0	0	1000		0	1000		0	0	6000	0	4000	4000	4000	4000	4000	4000	4000	5000	6000	6000
125	New entry	(England) Rod Lawler	0	0		0	600	2000	0	0	0	0	0	0	0	0	2000	1000		0	0		0	0	5600	0	2600	2600	2600	2600	2600	2600	2600	5600	5600	5600
126	▼30	(Republic of Ireland) Leo Fernandez (Note: Leo Fernandez has been suspended from the World Snooker Tour for fifteen months, starting 27 May 2016.)	0	0							0	0	0	0	5000	0	0	0		0	0		0	0	5000	0	0	0	0	0	0	5000	5000	5000	5000	5000
127	New entry	(Scotland) Rhys Clark	0	0	0	0	0	0	0	0	2500	0	0	0		0	0			0			0	0	2500	0	0	0	0	2500	2500	2500	2500	2500	2500	2500
128	▼33	(Wales) David John	0	2337	0	0	0	0	0	0								0		0			0	0	0	2337	2337	2337	2337	2337	2337	2337	2337	2337	2337	2337
129	New entry	(Germany) Lukas Kleckers	0	0	2000	0	0	0	0	0	0	0	0	0	0	0	0	0		0	0		0	0	2000	2000	2000	2000	2000	2000	2000	2000	2000	2000	2000	2000
130	New entry	(Egypt) Basem Eltahhan	0	0							0			0	0	0	0	500		0			0	0	500	0	0	0	0	0	0	0	0	500	500	500
131	New entry	(Australia) Matthew Bolton	0	0			0	0	0	0	0	0	0	0	0	0	0							0	0	0	0	0	0	0	0	0	0	0	0	0

Player did not enter tournament.
Player is still participating in tournament.
