= 2016–17 snooker world ranking points =

Preceded by 2015/2016	2016/2017	Succeeded by 2017/2018

The official 2016/2017 snooker world ranking points for the professional snooker players on the World Snooker Main Tour in the 2016–17 season are based on performances in ranking and minor-ranking tournaments over a two-year rolling period. The rankings at the start of 2016/2017 season are determined by prize money earned in the 2014/2015 and 2015/2016 seasons; starting with this season, the players are re-ranked at the beginning of the current season after removing players relegated at the end of the previous season from the ranking list. As points are accrued from tournaments throughout the current season, the points from the corresponding tournaments from two seasons earlier are dropped. The rankings are used to set the official tournament seedings at various points throughout the season; even though the rankings are officially updated after every tournament carrying ranking status not all the rankings are used as seedings, and only the rankings officially used as seedings are documented below. The total points accumulated by the cut-off dates for the revised seedings are based on all the points up to that date in the 2016/2017 season, all of the points from the 2015/2016 season, and the points from the 2014/2015 season that have not yet been dropped.

== Seeding revisions ==
Cut-off point	Date	After	2014/2015 points dropped
1	1 August 2016	World Open	Wuxi Classic, Australian Goldfields Open; AT (1), ET (1)
2	29 August 2016	Paul Hunter Classic	ET (2)
3	26 September 2016	Shanghai Masters	Shanghai Masters
4	31 October 2016	International Championship	International Championship; AT (2), ET (3)
5	5 December 2016	UK Championship	UK Championship; ET (4)
6	19 December 2016	Scottish Open	ET (5)
7	6 February 2017	German Masters	German Masters; AT (3)
8	6 March 2017	Gibraltar Open	Welsh Open, Indian Open; ET (6)
9	3 April 2017	China Open	China Open; PTC (Finals)
Total	2 May 2017	World Championship	World Championship

== Ranking points ==
No.	Ch (Note: "Ch" = Change since the beginning of the 2016/2017 season. See for the player rankings at the start of the season.)	Player	Season (Note: The 2014/2015 points only include the ranking points that count towards the next seedings update. All new players or players regaining a place on the tour started on 0 points.)		Tournament																			Season	Cut-off point (Note: See for the rankings at the first seedings cut-off point; see for the second; see for the third; see for the fourth; see for the fifth; see for the sixth; see for the seventh; see for the eighth; see for the ninth.)									Total
No.	Ch	Player	14/15	15/16	RM	IO	WOO	PHC	SM	EUM	ENO	IC	NIO	UK	SCO	GM	WGP	WEO	SSO	GO	PC	CO	WC	16/17	1	2	3	4	5	6	7	8	9	Total
1	Steady	(England) Mark Selby	0	438875	525		6500	18750	35000	13125	2500	125000		170000		3750	5000	3500		900	15000	85000	375000	859550	659733	675150	690650	827942	994942	994942	932025	935425	943425	1298425
2	▲4	(Scotland) John Higgins	0	260975	2250		12500		8000	8250	10000	17500	6000	22500	30000	1500	5000	0		525	10000	8000	160000	302025	401308	400725	408725	440892	456809	484892	483892	421500	423000	563000
3	Steady	(England) Judd Trump	0	192250	4500		6500		8000	56250	30000	30000		5000	20000	1500	7500	30000		9000	125000	12500	0	345750	411166	401166	409166	516499	446499	463166	456333	488500	598000	538000
4	▲5	(China) Ding Junhui	0	215425			6500		85000		3500	65000	0	10000			7500	0		525	30000	12500	75000	295525	311425	311425	376925	443925	444925	444925	442425	448450	465950	510950
5	▲9	(England) Barry Hawkins	0	104525		6000	6500		8000	4500	20000	0	30000	5000	6000	7500	100000	10000	500	1725	10000	0	75000	290725	214525	213525	221525	238025	270025	271025	276025	386750	380250	395250
6	▲6	(Hong Kong) Marco Fu	0	153475	525	3000	4000		0	2625	2500	7000	2500	35000	70000	3000	20000	2500			50000	0	37500	240150	244333	243750	243750	238375	253958	323375	325125	336625	376125	393625
7	▼2	(Australia) Neil Robertson	0	204000	37500		21000		0	13125	3500	12000		0	6000	3000	12500	2500		3000	15000		25000	154125	361499	359582	359582	380624	365291	371291	365958	358125	363125	358125
8	▼4	(England) Shaun Murphy	0	180475		13500	12500		0	2625	2500	17500	0	35000	2500	1500	12500	2500	8000	18750	10000	12500	25000	176875	456308	455308	447308	442100	444267	446767	419100	454350	457350	357350
9	▼7	(England) Stuart Bingham	0	89675	2250	6000	6500	525	19500	1312	20000	30000		5000	0	15000	5000	70000	0		10000	8000	25000	224087	581509	582034	516534	545846	518929	517012	527845	597262	588762	313762
10	▼3	(Northern Ireland) Mark Allen	0	218200				1725	8000	4500	3500	0	10000	15000	6000	3000	7500	3500	0	1725			25000	89450	382700	363592	336592	279592	294592	300592	299425	309650	302650	307650
11	▲6	(China) Liang Wenbo	0	126100			6500	900	6000	4500	70000	12000	2500	5000	10000		20000	2500	500	0	10000	4000	25000	179400	180601	179584	179584	265084	267667	277667	261000	278500	289500	305500
12	▲20	(England) Ali Carter	0	93050	2250	0	90000	900	12000	2625	3500	12000		10000	2500	26250	7500	3500			30000	6500	0	209525	213300	214200	226200	244325	254325	256825	283075	289075	322575	302575
13	▲3	(England) Kyren Wilson	0	175400		25000	6500	525	0	0	3500		20000	0	6000	1500	5000	0	0	0		21000	37500	126525	226399	226924	225174	225091	241508	246925	248425	246425	264425	301925
14	▼4	(England) Ronnie O'Sullivan	0	86000					8000	26250	3500	12000	6000	75000	10000	3000	7500	2500			15000	6500	37500	212750	296250	294333	302333	326583	257583	267583	262250	269750	291250	298750
15	▼2	(Wales) Mark Williams	0	82725	11250	3000	8000		0	0	6000	4000	10000	22500	6000	3000	5000	0	500	3000		35000	12000	129250	251008	251008	243008	222808	242975	247975	245975	210975	199975	211975
16	▼1	(England) Martin Gould	0	140425	1050	6000	0	0	6000	0	3500	4000		5000		15000	7500	0	0			6500	16000	70550	197142	196559	194559	185059	187059	187059	197892	200975	194975	210975
17	▲11	(Scotland) Anthony McGill	0	44350	4500	50000	12500	525	6000	8250	2500	4000	3500	5000	2500	0	7500	2500	32000	525	10000	4000	0	155800	193600	193125	197375	204125	192625	195125	192625	229650	230150	200150
18	▲5	(Wales) Ryan Day	0	85725	525	2000	8000	525	12000	1312	6000	4000	0	10000	2500	7500	40000	2500	0	4500	10000	0	0	111362	152832	153357	157357	159586	166003	167503	166670	209587	209087	197087
19	▲3	(England) David Gilbert	0	113100	2250	0	12500	525	8000	2625	3500	4000	3500	15000	0	3750	5000	0	4000	900		4000	12000	81550	166850	166792	174792	177917	186417	185417	186667	192650	188650	194650
20	▲16	(England) Mark King	0	56150	525	2000	4000	525	3000	0	2500	4000	70000	0	2500	3750	12500	2500	1000	525	10000	4000	12000	135325	100042	99984	102984	106967	175050	176550	175533	187975	188475	191475
21	▼13	(England) Ricky Walden	0	117025		2000	6500	900	0	4500	10000	12000	3500	10000	3500	3750	5000	0	500	1725		6500	0	70375	316308	312208	312208	211591	213091	216008	219758	191400	187400	187400
22	▼11	(England) Joe Perry	0	79250	525		40000	525	0	0	0	17500	3500	10000	3500	1500	12500	0	0	900		4000	8000	102450	294608	295133	295133	302716	306633	306800	294133	292700	193700	181700
23	▲6	(England) Michael Holt	0	81950	18750	0	6500	900	12000	2625	0	17500	2500	5000	2500	3750	5000	0	500	525		6500	12000	96550	144783	145683	149683	168808	172725	174225	175475	181500	175500	178500
24	▼6	(Scotland) Stephen Maguire	0	56750	0	9000	4000		19500	0	2500	7000	0	15000	3500	3000	5000	2500		525		12500	37500	121525	181167	179250	190750	196250	176250	158917	145250	143275	140775	178275
25	New entry	(England) Anthony Hamilton	0	0	0	3000	0	525	0	0	10000	7000	20000	0	6000	60000	5000	3500	4000	900	15000	0	8000	142925	3000	3525	3525	20525	40525	46525	106525	119925	134925	142925
26	▼7	(Wales) Michael White	0	58700		0	4000	1725	12000	0	2500	4000	10000	5000	2500	3000	7500	3500	500	900		8000	12000	77125	174533	175258	175258	159258	170675	173175	174925	133825	129825	135825
27	▲3	(Belgium) Luca Brecel	0	77025	525		4000	0	0	2625	0	4000	3500	22500	0	0		0	1000	900		0	16000	55050	129299	128299	125799	129091	151091	150508	150508	126075	122075	132075
28	▼1	(England) Ben Woollaston	0	72250	0	0	8000	0	6000	2625	6000	0	0	10000	2500	3750		0	0	900		6500	12000	58275	137599	137599	141849	146474	146891	148808	150708	118025	124525	130525
29	▼9	(Scotland) Alan McManus	0	97950	0		8000	900	0	0	2500	0	2500	5000	0	0		0	0			4000	8000	30900	155367	152934	140934	138517	146017	146017	144767	135850	132850	128850
30	▼6	(Scotland) Graeme Dott	0	68200	1050	2000	6500		0	2625	0	7000	0	5000	2500	0		3500	500			4000	25000	59675	152933	151933	139933	144558	129558	131475	130875	125375	122875	127875
31	▲12	(England) Tom Ford	0	57450	525	0	6500	9000	0	4500	6000	7000	2500	0	0	7500	5000	0	0	525		0	16000	65050	81558	90558	90558	108058	107558	107558	112558	115500	115500	122500
32	▲22	(China) Zhou Yuelong	0	37375	1050	2000	6500	0	0	0	2500	12000	3500	15000	0	0	5000	10000	0	900		6500	16000	80950	71925	71925	71525	78425	95925	95925	94425	108325	108325	118325
33	▲5	(Wales) Dominic Dale	0	48225	0	6000	0	4500	2000	2625	0	7000	6000	10000	6000	3000	5000	3500	1000	0		0	12000	68625	87725	91642	85642	91684	106684	110767	113767	121350	110850	116850
34	▼9	(England) Matthew Selt	0	72100		3000	8000		6000	0	2500	4000	0	0	0	1500		0	0	900		4000	8000	37900	155883	155300	155300	155300	142300	132300	131100	125500	114000	110000
35	▼14	(England) Robert Milkins	0	50950	0	6000	0		6000	0	0	0	0	10000	10000	1500		20000	500	525		4000	0	58525	149283	147366	153366	122783	113783	123783	125283	133975	121475	109475
36	▼1	(Wales) Jamie Jones	0	43900	1050	3000	0	3000	6000	1312		4000	0	22500	0	3000	5000	2500	0	1725		0	12000	65087	88283	90283	93783	95095	117012	115095	116845	116987	108987	108987
37	▼11	(England) Mark Davis	0	44750	525	3000	4000	3000	0	8250	2500	0	2500	5000	10000	1500		6000	0	1725		6500	8000	62500	134374	136791	136791	136608	123108	128108	127108	123750	111250	107250
38	▼4	(England) Jimmy Robertson	0	48900	2250	2000	6500	0	3000	1312	0	4000	2500	10000	0	0		3500	1000	525		4000	16000	56587	107233	106650	103650	101545	110045	109462	105962	104487	101487	105487
39	▲12	(China) Xiao Guodong	0	21750	4500	3000	6500	525	2000		6000	4000	0	5000	3500	0		0	16000			4000	25000	80025	69934	68542	70542	67542	69542	72042	67275	81775	85775	101775
40	▼9	(England) Peter Ebdon	0	56675	0	9000	4000		0	1312	0	0	3500	0	2500	3000		2500		900		0	16000	42712	126842	126842	126842	109654	103571	104154	102987	99887	89387	99387
41	▲8	(England) Rory McLeod	0	49300	1050	3000	0	525	2000	1312	0	0	0	5000	0	0		2500	0	0		8000	25000	48387	68183	68708	68958	70270	66270	65687	65687	64687	72687	97687
42	▼9	(Thailand) Thepchaiya Un-Nooh	0	63175	0	0	21000	4500	0		0	0	0	0	0	3000		3500	500			0	0	32500	122624	126541	124041	120841	119841	119258	117258	105675	101675	95675
43	▼6	(England) Mike Dunn	0	58375	0	2000	4000		0	0	0	4000	0	5000	3500	0		2500	0	525		6500	8000	36025	91958	90958	88458	87458	88875	92375	92375	92400	92400	94400
44	▲16	(England) David Grace	0	54350	0	2000	4000	3000		2625	3500	4000	0	0	0	0		0	4000	0		0	16000	39125	61516	64516	64516	74058	73475	73475	73475	77475	77475	93475
45	▼5	(Republic of Ireland) Fergal O'Brien	0	34175	1050	0	4000	525	2000	1312	3500	4000	3500	10000	2500	0		3500	2000	0		4000	16000	57887	80725	79333	69333	70562	82145	84062	81562	84062	85062	92062
46	▲18	(England) Stuart Carrington	0	25375	1050	2000	4000	525	8000	0	3500	4000	0	0	2500	3000		10000	500			4000	16000	59075	55592	56117	61617	68534	66617	69117	70867	76450	80450	84450
47	▲16	(China) Yu Delu	0	22550	0	0	4000	0	0	2625	0	0	2500	10000	20000	1500	5000	0				4000	12000	61625	49900	49900	49900	49525	59025	79025	78675	80175	81175	84175
48	▼7	(England) Mark Joyce	0	45325	0	2000	0	525	2000	1312	0	7000	0	5000	2500	1500		0	500	0		8000	8000	38337	71441	71383	73383	77495	78912	81412	81662	76662	81662	83662
49	▲7	(England) Andrew Higginson	0	31275	525	3000	4000	900	3000	4500	2500	4000	2500	5000	0	1500		0	500	0		8000	8000	47925	66300	67200	64200	71617	74200	73200	74700	75200	80200	79200
50	▼2	(China) Tian Pengfei	0	51500	1050	0	0	0	0	0	0	4000	0	0	0	1500		2500	500	525		8000	8000	26075	75466	72133	70383	72883	72300	72300	71550	67575	75575	77575
51	▼5	(England) Sam Baird	0	39775	525	3000	0	1725	0	0	0	12000	3500	5000	0	0		2500	0	0		0	8000	36250	72132	73274	71524	70941	78858	77858	76608	74025	74025	76025
52	▼2	(Norway) Kurt Maflin	0	24450	0	0	8000	900	6000	1312	0	7000	6000	5000	2500	0		10000	0	525		4000	0	51237	75700	76600	80850	85579	93579	94162	94162	104687	87687	75687
53	▲2	(England) Robbie Williams	0	35925	0	3000	4000	1725	2000	0	0	4000	3500	5000	0	1500		6000	0	0		0	8000	38725	68174	69316	69566	68649	73566	72983	73233	78650	78650	74650
54	▼15	(England) Jack Lisowski	0	45400	1050	2000	0	900	3000	1312	0	0	6000	0	0	1500		0	2000	3000		0	8000	28762	77699	78016	75016	75745	72745	72162	73662	78662	72162	74162
55	▼11	(Wales) Matthew Stevens	0	25825	2250	3000	4000	525	3000	1312	0	7000	0	15000	2500	1500		0	0	0		6500	0	46587	78824	78766	81766	86495	91912	94412	95912	88912	92412	72412
56	New entry	(China) Yan Bingtao	0	0	2250	0	0	1725	500	2625	6000	7000	6000	10000	0	7500	5000	6000	0	525		0	16000	71125	2250	3975	4475	20100	36100	36100	43600	55125	55125	71125
57	▼15	(England) Gary Wilson	0	19475	525	6000	4000	525	0	1312	0	4000	6000	0	2500	1500		0	0	525		6500	16000	49387	86199	86141	86141	90870	96870	98787	98837	87362	58862	68862
58	▼6	(China) Li Hang	0	30625	1050	0	0	900	2000	0	2500	7000	0	0	3500	0		0	2000			6500	12000	37450	70058	70375	66375	63275	63275	66775	64075	58575	65075	68075
59	▲30	(Iran) Hossein Vafaei	0	13625		0	0					0	10000	0	2500			6000	500	0		21000	12000	52000	13625	13625	13625	13625	23625	26125	26125	32625	53625	65625
60	▲1	(England) Oliver Lines	0	22975	0	6000	4000	0	0	1312	0	4000	0	15000	3500	0		0	0	0		0	8000	41812	56725	56725	56725	53037	67454	69954	68704	66787	62787	64787
61	▲4	(England) Alfie Burden	0	30100	0	2000	4000	0	0	8250	0	4000	0	0	0	0		0	1000	3000		4000	8000	34250	36100	36100	36100	48350	48350	48350	48350	52350	56350	64350
62	▲25	(Wales) Daniel Wells	0	14300	0	2000	8000		2000	1312	2500	7000	0	5000	3500	0		0	1000	900		8000	8000	49212	24300	24300	26300	37112	42112	45612	45612	47512	55512	63512
63	▲20	(England) Chris Wakelin	0	21700	525	0	0	525	2000	0	10000	4000	2500	5000	3500	0		2500	500	525		0	8000	39575	22225	22750	24750	38750	46250	49750	49750	53275	53275	61275
64	▲18	(Thailand) Noppon Saengkham	0	23500	525	0	0		0	0	2500	0	0	5000	3500	1500		0	500	525		6500	16000	36550	24025	24025	24025	26525	31525	35025	36525	37550	44050	60050
65	New entry	(Scotland) Scott Donaldson	0	0	0	0	0	525	6000	4500	2500	0	6000	5000	2500	0		20000	500	0		4000	8000	59525	0	525	6525	13525	24525	27025	27025	47525	51525	59525
66	▼4	(England) Ian Burns	0	33950	1050	0	4000	0	0	1312	2500	4000	0	0	3500	0		3500	0	0		4000	0	23862	54783	54783	53033	48645	48645	51562	50312	53812	57812	57812
67	▲13	(Scotland) Ross Muir	0	24150	0	0	0	0	500	0	2500	4000	0	5000	0	1500		3500	2000	0		4000	8000	31000	24150	24150	24650	31150	36150	36150	37650	43150	47150	55150
68	▼21	(England) Rod Lawler	0	20725	0	0	4000	900	2000	1312	2500	4000	0	5000	0	0		0	0			0	12000	31712	76724	72624	72874	68103	57770	56770	55520	50437	46437	52437
69	▼10	(Finland) Robin Hull	0	20000	0	2000	4000		0	2625	0	4000	3500	5000	3500	3750		3500	500			0	0	32375	54066	54066	53666	60291	65791	68708	72458	72375	64375	52375
70	▼25	(Thailand) Dechawat Poomjaeng	0	38225	525	2000	0	525	2000	0	0	0	0	0	0	0		0	0			0	8000	13050	79232	76424	75924	72141	62558	62558	62358	57275	49275	51275
71	▼18	(Northern Ireland) Joe Swail	0	28025	525	3000	0	525	0	1312	3500	0	0	0	3500	0		0	1000	0		0	8000	21362	68633	69158	63158	55387	53470	55970	55970	53387	50387	49387
72	▼1	(England) Nigel Bond	0	18775	0	13500	0	0	3000	0	0	0	0	0	0	0		0	500	4500		0	8000	29500	32275	32275	35275	35275	35275	35275	35275	40275	40275	48275
73	▼16	(Republic of Ireland) Ken Doherty	0	28650	2250	0	0		0	0	0	4000	2500	0	0	0		0	2000			0	8000	18750	63233	63233	57233	61233	54150	54150	52900	51400	48400	47400
74	▲3	(England) Martin O'Donnell	0	26875	1050	2000	0	0	2000		0		0	0	0	0		0	0	525		6500	8000	20075	29925	29925	31925	31925	31925	31925	31925	32450	38950	46950
75	▲20	(Scotland) Rhys Clark	0	9825	0	0	0	525	500	4500	6000	0	0	5000	2500	0		0	500	900		4000	8000	32425	9825	10350	10850	21350	26350	28850	28850	30250	34250	42250
76	▲2	(England) Jamie Cope	0	25100	525	0	4000	0	500	0	0	0	2500	0	0	0		2500	0	0		4000	0	14025	29625	29625	30125	30125	32625	32625	32625	35125	39125	39125
77	New entry	(England) John Astley	0	0	4500	6000	0	900	0	0	2500	7000	2500	0	0	3000		2500	500	1725		0	8000	39125	10500	11400	11400	20900	23400	23400	26400	31125	31125	39125
78	New entry	(China) Zhang Anda	0	0		0	8000		3000	0	2500	0	3500	15000	2500	0		0	0	0		4000	0	38500	8000	8000	11000	13500	32000	34500	34500	34500	38500	38500
79	▲13	(Thailand) Akani Songsermsawad	0	0	0	9000	0		500	0	2500	4000	3500	0	2500	3000		0	500			0	12000	37500	9000	9000	9500	16000	19500	22000	25000	25500	25500	37500
80	New entry	(England) Liam Highfield	0	0	0	2000	0	1725	0		3500	0		15000	2500	1500		0	1000	0		0	8000	35225	2000	3725	3725	7225	22225	24725	26225	27225	27225	35225
81	New entry	(Wales) Lee Walker	0	0	525	0	4000	900	500	0	2500	4000	2500	0	0	0		6000	0	900		0	12000	33825	4525	5425	5925	12425	14925	14925	14925	21825	21825	33825
82	New entry	(China) Mei Xiwen	0	0				900	8000	1312	2500	0	0	10000	3500	0		6000	0	0		0	0	32212	0	900	8900	12712	22712	26212	26212	32212	32212	32212
83	▲30	(Scotland) Eden Sharav	0	2700	0	2000	0		500	0	0	4000	2500	0	0	0		2500	1000	525		6500	8000	27525	4700	4700	5200	9200	11700	11700	11700	15725	22225	30225
84	▼26	(Scotland) Jamie Burnett	0	24025	0	2000																		2000	58108	58108	58108	40608	40608	40608	40608	38025	35025	26025
85	New entry	(England) Hammad Miah	0	0	0	0	4000	0	3000	1312	0	0	0	5000	0	0		0	0	525		0	12000	25837	4000	4000	7000	8312	13312	13312	13312	13837	13837	25837
86	▲25	(England) Allan Taylor	0	3500	525	2000	4000	0	500	1312	0	0	2500	0	0	1500		2500	500	900		4000	0	20237	10025	10025	10525	11837	14337	14337	15837	19737	23737	23737
87	New entry	(China) Zhao Xintong	0	0	1050	2000	0	525	2000	1312	2500	4000	0	5000	0	3750		0	500	900		0	0	23537	3050	3575	5575	13387	18387	18387	22137	23537	23537	23537
88	New entry	(Thailand) James Wattana (Note: James Wattana has an Invitational Tour Card to compete in events.)	0	0		2000	4000		500	0	2500	12000	0	0	0	0		2500				0	0	23500	6000	6000	6500	21000	21000	21000	21000	23500	23500	23500
89	▲1	(England) Sean O'Sullivan	0	13250	1050	0	0	0	500	0	0	0	0	0	6000	0		2500	0	0		0	0	10050	14300	14300	14800	14800	14800	20800	20800	23300	23300	23300
90	New entry	(Cyprus) Michael Georgiou	0	0	525	3000	0	900	500	1312	0	0	2500	10000	2500	0		0	2000	0		0	0	23237	3525	4425	4925	6237	18737	21237	21237	23237	23237	23237
91	▲8	(England) Paul Davison	0	7750	0	0	0	0	3000	0	0	0	0	5000	0	0		2500	0	0		4000	0	14500	7750	7750	10750	10750	15750	15750	15750	18250	22250	22250
92	New entry	(England) Mitchell Mann	0	0	0	2000	0	0	0	0	0	0	2500	10000	3500	0		3500	0	525		0	0	22025	2000	2000	2000	2000	14500	18000	18000	22025	22025	22025
93	▲4	(England) Sanderson Lam	0	8700	0	0	0	525	0	0	0	0	3500	0	0	0		0	0	1725		6500	0	12250	8700	9225	9225	9225	12725	12725	12725	14450	20950	20950
94	▲27	(England) Jimmy White	0	500		2000	0	3000	0	0	0	0	2500	0	3500	3000		0	1000	525		4000	0	19525	2500	5500	5500	5500	8000	11500	14500	16025	20025	20025
95	▲3	(China) Zhang Yong	0	8000	525	2000	4000	0	500	0	0	0	0	0	0	3000		0	1000	525		0	0	11550	14525	14525	15025	15025	15025	15025	18025	19550	19550	19550
96	New entry	(Wales) Jak Jones	0	0	1050		0	0		1312	6000	7000		0	0	1500		0	2000			0	0	18862	1050	1050	1050	15362	15362	15362	16862	18862	18862	18862
97	New entry	(England) Sam Craigie	0	0	525	0	6500		0	1312		0	2500	5000	0	1500		0	1000	525			0	18862	7025	7025	7025	8337	15837	15837	17337	18862	18862	18862
98	▲20	(Wales) Duane Jones	0	775	0	3000	4000		500	1312	2500	0	2500	0	2500	0		0	0	525		0	0	16837	7775	7775	8275	12087	14587	17087	17087	17612	17612	17612
99	New entry	(India) Aditya Mehta	0	0		0			0	0	0	7000	2500	0	2500	1500		0	0	0		4000	0	17500	0	0	0	7000	9500	12000	13500	13500	17500	17500
100	▲1	(England) Sydney Wilson	0	6750	0	0	0	0	0	0	0	0	0	0	2500	0		0	0	0		0	8000	10500	6750	6750	6750	6750	6750	9250	9250	9250	9250	17250
101	New entry	(Wales) Ian Preece	0	0		0	0		3000		3500		0	0	2500	0		0	0			0	8000	17000	0	0	3000	6500	6500	9000	9000	9000	9000	17000
102	New entry	(China) Fang Xiongman	0	0	525	2000	0		0	0		0	0	0	2500	1500		0	500	525		0	8000	15550	2525	2525	2525	2525	2525	5025	6525	7550	7550	15550
103	New entry	(China) Wang Yuchen	0	0	0	0	4000		0		0	4000	0	5000	0	0		2500	0	0		0	0	15500	4000	4000	4000	8000	13000	13000	13000	15500	15500	15500
104	▼12	(Isle of Man) Darryl Hill	0	11550	0	0	0		0	0	0	0	0	0	0	0		2500	1000	0		0	0	3500	11550	11550	11550	11550	11550	11550	11550	15050	15050	15050
105	▲11	(Scotland) Fraser Patrick	0	2050	525		0	0	0	0	3500	0	3500	0	0	0		0	500	525		4000	0	12550	2575	2575	2575	6075	9575	9575	9575	10600	14600	14600
106	▲4	(England) James Cahill	0	3700	525	0	4000	900	0	0	2500	0	0	0	0	1500		0	1000	0		0	0	10425	8225	9125	9125	11625	11625	11625	13125	14125	14125	14125
107	New entry	(England) Craig Steadman	0	0	0	0	0	525	500	0	2500	0	2500	0	0	1500		6000	0	525		0	0	14050	0	525	1025	3525	6025	6025	7525	14050	14050	14050
108	New entry	(Malta) Alex Borg	0	0	0	0	0	0	0	0	0	0	2500	0	2500	1500		2500	0			4000	0	13000	0	0	0	0	2500	5000	6500	9000	13000	13000
109	New entry	(Malaysia) Thor Chuan Leong	0	0	0	0	6500	0	2000	0	0	0	0	0	0	0		2500	0	900		0	0	11900	6500	6500	8500	8500	8500	8500	8500	11900	11900	11900
110	▲2	(Wales) Gareth Allen	0	2775	525	0	0	0	2000	0	0	0	0	0	2500	0		0	0	0		4000	0	9025	3300	3300	5300	5300	5300	7800	7800	7800	11800	11800
111	▲15	(Brazil) Igor Figueiredo	0	0									0	0	2500	1500		6000	0	1725		0	0	11725	0	0	0	0	0	2500	4000	11725	11725	11725
112	▼10	(Pakistan) Hamza Akbar	0	6600	0		0		500	0	0	0	2500	0				0	500	0			0	3500	6600	6600	7100	7100	9600	9600	9600	10100	10100	10100
113	New entry	(England) Adam Duffy	0	0	525	0	0	525	3000	1312	0	0	2500	0	0	1500		0	0	0		0	0	9362	525	1050	4050	5362	7862	7862	9362	9362	9362	9362
114	New entry	(England) Elliot Slessor	0	0	0	2000	0	525	0	1312	2500	0	0	0	0	0		2500	0	525		0	0	9362	2000	2525	2525	6337	6337	6337	6337	9362	9362	9362
115	New entry	(Republic of Ireland) Josh Boileau	0	0	0		0	0	0	1312	0		3500	0	0	0		3500	0	0		0	0	8312	0	0	0	1312	4812	4812	4812	8312	8312	8312
116	New entry	(Thailand) Kritsanut Lertsattayathorn	0	0					2000	0	3500	0	2500	0	0	0						0	0	8000	0	0	2000	5500	8000	8000	8000	8000	8000	8000
117	▼8	(England) Michael Wild	0	4000	0	0	0	0	0	2625	0	0	0	0	0	0		0	0	0		0	0	2625	4000	4000	4000	6625	6625	6625	6625	6625	6625	6625
118	New entry	(China) Cao Yupeng	0	0		0	4000	525	0	0	0	0	0	0	0	0		0	2000			0	0	6525	4000	4525	4525	4525	4525	4525	4525	6525	6525	6525
119	New entry	(England) Christopher Keogan	0	0	525	0	0	525	0	0	0	0	0	0	0	1500		2500	0	0		0	0	5050	525	1050	1050	1050	1050	1050	2550	5050	5050	5050
120	New entry	(Thailand) Boonyarit Keattikun	0	0		0	0		0	0	0	0	0	0	0	1500		2500	0			0	0	4000	0	0	0	0	0	0	1500	4000	4000	4000
121	New entry	(China) Chen Zhe	0	0		0	0	0	500	0	0	0	2500	0	0	0		0	500			0	0	3500	0	0	500	500	3000	3000	3000	3500	3500	3500
122	New entry	(England) Jamie Curtis-Barrett	0	0	0			0	500		0		2500	0	0	0		0	500	0		0	0	3500	0	0	500	500	3000	3000	3000	3500	3500	3500
123	New entry	(Australia) Kurt Dunham	0	0	0	0	0	525	0	0	0	0	2500	0	0	0		0	0	0		0	0	3025	0	525	525	525	3025	3025	3025	3025	3025	3025
124	▼9	(England) Jason Weston	0	2100	0	0	0	0	0	0	0	0	0	0	0	0		0	500	0		0	0	500	2100	2100	2100	2100	2100	2100	2100	2600	2600	2600
125	New entry	(Wales) David John	0	0		0	0	0	0	1312	0	0	0	0	0	0		0	500	525		0	0	2337	0	0	0	1312	1312	1312	1312	2337	2337	2337
126	New entry	(China) Rouzi Maimaiti	0	0																				0	0	0	0	0	0	0	0	0	0	0
127	▼3	(Brazil) Itaro Santos	0	0	0	0	0		0		0		0	0	0	0			0			0	0	0	0	0	0	0	0	0	0	0	0	0
128	▼3	(Egypt) Hatem Yassen	0	0	0	0	0	0	0									0	0				0	0	0	0	0	0	0	0	0	0	0	0
129	New entry	(Republic of Ireland) Leo Fernandez (Note: Leo Fernandez has been suspended from the World Snooker Tour for 15 months, starting from 27 May 2016.)	0	0																				0	0	0	0	0	0	0	0	0	0	0

Player did not enter tournament.
Player is still participating in tournament.
