= 2015–16 snooker world ranking points =

Preceded by 2014/2015	2015/2016	Succeeded by 2016/2017

The official 2015/2016 snooker world ranking points for the professional snooker players on the World Snooker Main Tour in the 2015–16 season are based on performances in ranking and minor-ranking in tournaments over a two-year rolling period. The rankings at the start of 2015/2016 season are determined by prize money earned in the 2013/2014 and 2014/2015 seasons and are updated after every tournament carrying ranking status. As points are accrued from tournaments throughout the current season, the points from the corresponding tournaments from two seasons earlier are dropped. If a player loses their first match in a tournament, then for the 2013/2014 season only, half the money earned for the event counts towards the player's ranking, and from the 2014/2015 season a player will not receive any points at all for that tournament.

The rankings set the official seedings at the start of the season and at seven further stages. The total points accumulated by the cut-off dates for the revised seedings are based on all the points up to that date in the 2015/2016 season, all of the points from the 2014/2015 season, and the points from the 2013/2014 season that have not yet been dropped.

== Seeding revisions ==
Cut-off point	Date	After	2013/2014 points dropped
1	6 July 2015	Australian Goldfields Open	Wuxi Classic, Australian Goldfields Open; AT (1)
2	21 September 2015	Shanghai Masters	Shanghai Masters; ET (1 · 2 · 3)
3	2 November 2015	International Championship	Indian Open, International Championship; AT (2 · 3), ET (4)
4	7 December 2015	UK Championship	UK Championship; ET (5 · 6)
5	14 December 2015	Gibraltar Open	ET (7)
6	8 February 2016	German Masters	German Masters
7	4 April 2016	China Open	Welsh Open, World Open, China Open; ET (8), AT (4), PTC (Finals)
Total	4 May 2016	World Championship	World Championship

== Ranking points ==
No.	Ch (Note: "Ch" = Change since the beginning of the 2015/2016 season. See for the player rankings at the start of the season.)	Player	Season (Note: The 2013/2014 points only include the ranking points that count towards the next seedings update. All new players or players regaining a place on the tour started on 0 points.)		Tournament										Season	Cut-off point (Note: See for the rankings at the first seedings cut-off point; see for the second; see for the third; see for the fourth; see for the fifth; see for the sixth; see for the seventh.)							Total
No.	Ch	Player	13/14	14/15	PTC	AO	SM	IC	UK	GM	WEO	WGP	CO	WC	15/16	1	2	3	4	5	6	7	Total
1	Steady	(England) Mark Selby	0	241166	26625	6000		30000	30000	3750	10000	2500		330000	438875	748882	729307	735332	697232	678124	679374	650041	680041
2	Steady	(England) Stuart Bingham	0	497045	5925	0	19500	4000	9000	3750	0	35000	12500	0	89675	595278	608745	591212	567720	570303	572803	592720	586720
3	▲4	(England) Judd Trump	0	260916	15250	8500	35000	0	9000	7500	5000	5000	85000	22000	192250	401332	436474	432474	419141	418666	396999	456166	453166
4	▲2	(England) Shaun Murphy	0	269583	35975	0	8000	12000	12000	3000	3000	100000	6500	0	180475	451249	454974	465116	468116	467533	466366	475058	450058
5	▼2	(Australia) Neil Robertson	0	202360	0	0	0	17500	150000	0	30000	2500	4000	0	204000	503943	482943	479443	475943	475943	473443	461360	406360
6	▲7	(Scotland) John Higgins	0	139950	4975	37500	8000	125000	20000	1500	5000	5000	21000	33000	260975	285900	263450	376150	385875	385817	384817	373925	400925
7	▲5	(Northern Ireland) Mark Allen	0	174500	122200	0	19500	17500	9000	3000	20000	5000	0	22000	218200	311500	327225	331450	298367	296450	298200	386700	392700
8	▲2	(England) Ricky Walden	0	207727	48025	6000		0	4000	0	2000		35000	22000	117025	318827	295727	297310	271027	271752	271752	318752	324752
9	▼5	(China) Ding Junhui	0	99500	27425		12000	7000	0	1500	10000	20000	0	137500	215425	584600	511600	356500	334500	331692	266525	183425	314925
10	▼5	(England) Ronnie O'Sullivan	0	210250	0					1500	60000	2500		22000	86000	465866	459766	431933	410250	400250	401750	399250	296250
11	▼2	(England) Joe Perry	0	210833	3750	8500	0	17500	4000	1500	20000	20000	4000	0	79250	336348	330232	312632	304932	301599	294766	306083	290083
12	▼1	(Hong Kong) Marco Fu	0	99766	31475	0	0	17500	20000	3000	5000	2500	8000	66000	153475	265116	248516	198841	217241	234074	235824	203241	253241
13	▲1	(Wales) Mark Williams	0	154650	16225		12000	7000	4000	3000	5000	2500	0	33000	82725	238233	227142	224142	221542	219625	220125	208625	237375
14	▼6	(England) Barry Hawkins	0	123500	45275		0	7000	4000	3750	5000	2500	4000	33000	104525	368683	363458	363875	345358	344775	346025	250025	228025
15	▲11	(England) Martin Gould	0	77334	14425	16000	12000	4000	20000	60000	5000	5000	4000	0	140425	132267	132651	127734	148259	148259	208259	229759	217759
16	▲40	(England) Kyren Wilson	0	20499	13900	1000	85000	7000	9000	15000	0	5000	6500	33000	175400	62782	136849	134374	141757	142899	157899	174899	195899
17	▲5	(China) Liang Wenbo	0	61001	13850		6000	7000	70000	3000	3000	10000	0	13250	126100	139201	146126	118426	178851	183351	182184	178101	187101
18	▼3	(Scotland) Stephen Maguire	0	124700	3750	10000	0	0	12000	7500	0	2500	21000	0	56750	210966	203558	187958	174358	174883	179883	187450	181450
19	▼2	(Wales) Michael White	0	119333	20200	8500	0	12000	0	1500	10000	2500	4000	0	58700	177832	178349	175541	171883	179883	180133	190033	178033
20	▲3	(Scotland) Alan McManus	0	66001	11950		6000	0	4000	3000	3000		4000	66000	97950	128159	135959	128776	130093	130035	128868	122951	163951
21	▼5	(England) Robert Milkins	0	112694	13200	6000	6000	0	4000	0	2000		6500	13250	50950	160160	157977	156044	147761	147761	147761	154644	163644
22	▲13	(England) David Gilbert	0	42583	11350	0	2000	65000	9000	0	2000	2500	8000	13250	113100	93216	82941	142858	149366	148783	147533	154433	155683
23	▼3	(Wales) Ryan Day	0	68082	21475		8000	12000	4000	7500	3000	10000	6500	13250	85725	154699	154707	147732	156299	155282	146115	156557	153807
24	▼6	(Scotland) Graeme Dott	0	83283	10450		0	12000	4000	15000	3000	2500	8000	13250	68200	172316	173716	154658	141658	141183	153683	142483	151483
25	▲5	(England) Matthew Selt	0	77900	13000	8500	8000	4000	20000		3000	2500	6500	6600	72100	117157	127391	128133	147475	148000	148000	151900	150000
26	▼7	(England) Mark Davis	0	95127	10150	0	12000	0	9000	0	3000		4000	6600	44750	162610	158985	142985	146468	147368	139035	139277	139877
27	▲5	(England) Ben Woollaston	0	65449	24000	4500	0	12000	9000	3750	10000	2500	6500	0	72250	99415	101165	111857	117524	113049	115549	141949	137699
28	▼4	(Scotland) Anthony McGill	0	90667	2850		0	7000	4000	1500	3000		4000	22000	44350	136643	132984	124467	119992	120517	119517	118017	135017
29	▼4	(England) Michael Holt	0	51583	12700	6000	8000	7000	9000	3750	2000	5000	6500	22000	81950	135131	127265	126207	125232	125174	120591	123533	133533
30	▲14	(Belgium) Luca Brecel	0	53332	10675	0	6000	4000	12000	26250	5000	2500	4000	6600	77025	77431	82881	88023	94215	95357	120357	128757	130357
31	Steady	(England) Peter Ebdon	0	67167	5925	0	6000	7000	12000	1500	2000	5000	4000	13250	56675	105417	111692	100917	109342	111067	111317	114842	123842
32	▼3	(England) Ali Carter	0	28000	33050	6000	0	4000	9000	3000	2000	10000	4000	22000	93050	112050	125100	120000	118300	117300	119050	115050	121050
33	▲16	(Thailand) Thepchaiya Un-Nooh	0	40032	2275		0	30000	9000	0	2000	10000	0	9900	63175	71698	71448	95615	103615	103032	101782	98307	103207
34	▲7	(England) Jimmy Robertson	0	49472	12000	0	0	12000	4000	1500	3000		6500	9900	48900	79863	73713	88738	90280	90280	90530	96972	98372
35	▲3	(Wales) Jamie Jones	0	54283	3900	10000	6000	7000	9000	1500	0	2500	4000	0	43900	102383	104833	105441	109383	109700	111200	106683	98183
36	Steady	(England) Mark King	0	41567	21500	4500	2000	0	0	3750	2000		12500	9900	56150	94834	94151	92351	87734	89734	90984	92067	97717
37	▲5	(England) Mike Dunn	0	29055	22475	0	8000	4000	4000	1500	2000		6500	9900	58375	75454	76696	75996	81313	81838	82088	77530	87430
38	▼5	(Wales) Dominic Dale	0	39083	16325	0	3000	7000	4000	0	0		8000	9900	48225	92849	93483	100925	106050	109050	104883	102408	87308
39	▲14	(England) Jack Lisowski	0	40749	3000	4500	2000	7000	9000	1500	2000		6500	9900	45400	66332	66299	70824	80349	75349	74349	76749	86149
40	▼13	(Republic of Ireland) Fergal O'Brien	0	51750	4575	6000	0	7000	4000	3000	3000		0	6600	34175	118599	113458	105983	101025	100925	102675	83575	85925
41	▲6	(England) Mark Joyce	0	34366	1725	6000	2000	4000	9000	7500	2000		6500	6600	45325	81831	76648	69865	80007	79424	85674	78091	79691
42	▼8	(England) Gary Wilson	0	60199	2875	0	0	0	4000		2000		4000	6600	19475	99481	93156	82998	77215	77157	74657	73074	79674
43	▲16	(England) Tom Ford	0	22083	17850	0	6000	4000	12000		2000	5000	4000	6600	57450	50949	61516	63258	75558	76458	75208	84933	79533
44	▼16	(Wales) Matthew Stevens	0	53193	1425		2000	4000	0	1500	3000		4000	9900	25825	97626	94951	86951	77368	76368	75368	73368	79018
45	▼2	(Thailand) Dechawat Poomjaeng	0	40065	1825		2000	4000	12000	1500	3000		4000	9900	38225	67873	70048	70865	79865	79865	78865	76890	78290
46	▲26	(England) Sam Baird	0	36332	11275	500	0	0	0	0	2000		4000	22000	39775	36832	36832	37357	41857	42382	42382	54107	76107
47	▼8	(England) Rod Lawler	0	54999	3225	0	2000	4000	0	1500	2000		8000	0	20725	94823	94732	88674	85991	86308	71141	76224	75724
48	▲34	(China) Tian Pengfei	0	23116	17000		3000	12000	4000	3000	2000	2500	8000	0	51500	23116	27016	49316	53316	54216	57216	74616	74616
49	▲13	(England) Rory McLeod	0	23416	26200	500	3000	0	0	3000	2000		8000	6600	49300	47199	48524	64074	60474	59474	62474	66616	72716
50	▼13	(Norway) Kurt Maflin	0	47833	3800		0	4000	0	3750	3000		0	9900	24450	93483	89825	82942	78767	77375	76958	67383	72283
51	▼30	(China) Xiao Guodong	0	49295	2350	0	0	4000	4000	1500	0		0	9900	21750	136911	101836	96453	91978	91978	85145	73145	71045
52	▲3	(China) Li Hang	0	40300	4025	500	3000	0	9000	1500	2000		4000	6600	30625	58900	61450	62750	62750	63275	63525	65325	70925
53	▲11	(Northern Ireland) Joe Swail	0	38972	525	1000	3000	4000	12000	1500	2000		4000	0	28025	55488	55996	53663	65080	65080	66580	71997	66997
54	▲21	(China) Zhou Yuelong	0	28283	4475	1000	500	12000	4000	1500	0		4000	9900	37375	29283	30308	43108	48008	48533	50033	55758	65658
55	▼5	(England) Robbie Williams	0	29249	3675	500	2000	4000	9000	1500	2000		0	13250	35925	69664	69848	60290	60690	61007	62507	63924	65174
56	▼8	(England) Andrew Higginson	0	33083	14275	4500	3000	4000	0	1500	0		4000	0	31275	70682	68524	70666	67966	69108	69358	72858	64358
57	▼12	(Republic of Ireland) Ken Doherty	0	35333	2250	500	2000	4000	4000	3000	3000		0	9900	28650	71150	72725	72808	77333	77333	79083	70083	63983
58	▼12	(Scotland) Jamie Burnett	0	36583	525	4500	3000	4000	12000	0	0		0	0	24025	78350	80375	79375	81275	81275	77108	72608	60608
59	▲2	(Finland) Robin Hull	0	40566	900		0	0	9000	1500	2000		0	6600	20000	56166	56166	53166	61566	61566	63066	65966	60566
60	▲51	(England) David Grace	0	5166	3000	250	8000	0	30000	0	0	2500	4000	6600	54350	5416	13416	13416	43416	46416	46416	52916	59516
61	▲17	(England) Oliver Lines	0	27833	4875	500	0	7000	4000	0	0		0	6600	22975	28333	30058	37583	42483	44208	44208	44208	50808
62	▲27	(England) Ian Burns	0	16672	4050	6000	500	4000	0	3000	0		6500	9900	33950	22672	26172	30172	30697	31222	34222	40722	50622
63	▼11	(China) Yu Delu	0	27850	1050		0	7000	4000	1500	5000		4000	0	22550	64850	58250	63375	64375	63900	65400	50900	50400
64	▼1	(England) Stuart Carrington	0	24056	5775	0	0	0	4000	3000	2000		4000	6600	25375	55639	56139	49081	44806	44806	47806	51331	49431
65	▲18	(China) Zhang Anda	0	21216	4600	1000	2000	0	0	3750	0		0	13250	24600	22216	24216	26866	27391	28291	32041	32566	45816
66	▼26	(Northern Ireland) Gerard Greene	0	21082	1950	4500	3000	0	4000	0	0		4000	6600	24050	84740	86957	75857	78782	78782	77532	39032	45132
67	▲7	(England) Liam Highfield	0	29066	2250	500	3000	0	0	0	0		0	9900	15650	29566	32566	32566	32566	33091	33091	34816	44716
68	▲5	(England) Craig Steadman	0	30449	1450	0	500	4000	0	0	0		0	6600	12550	30449	31474	35874	35874	35874	35874	36399	42999
69	▼18	(Republic of Ireland) David Morris	0	29083	1050	1000	3000	0	0	1500	0		0	6600	13150	59516	59058	55141	41441	40858	41108	35633	42233
70	▲18	(England) Mitchell Mann	0	17366	3675	500	0	0	0	0	2000		4000	13250	23425	17866	18391	19291	19816	19816	19816	27541	40791
71	▼13	(England) Anthony Hamilton	0	17998	2325	500	0	0	4000	1500	3000		0	9900	21225	50399	44807	41807	42190	43090	40423	29823	39223
72	▼12	(China) Cao Yupeng	0	24650	925		2000	4000	0	0	0		0	6600	13525	46400	42925	42325	42325	42325	41075	36575	38175
73	▼16	(England) Peter Lines	0	19200	2225	500	2000	0	0	0	2000		4000	6600	17325	53449	47149	40166	35983	35983	33483	34925	36525
74	▲30	(Wales) Lee Walker	0	7983	3750	500	500	7000	0	0	0		6500	6600	24850	8483	10408	18308	18308	19208	19208	26233	32833
75	▼8	(England) Alfie Burden	0	0	6000	0	0	0	0	3000	2000		12500	6600	30100	0	1425	1950	2475	5475	8475	23500	30100
76	▲14	(England) Michael Georgiou	0	15766	1325	4500	0	0	4000	0	3000		0	0	12825	20266	20791	21591	25591	25591	25591	28591	28591
77	New entry	(England) Martin O'Donnell	0	0	4025	250	500	4000	0	1500	2000		8000	6600	26875	250	2550	7350	7875	7875	9375	20275	26875
78	▼12	(England) Jamie Cope	0	0	2250	250	8000	4000	4000	0	0		0	6600	25100	250	10500	14500	18500	18500	18500	18500	25100
79	▲8	(England) Joel Walker	0	17566	2100	4500	500	0	0	0	0		0	0	7100	22066	23616	23616	24141	24666	24666	24666	24666
80	▲19	(Scotland) Ross Muir	0	0	1300	250	500	4000	4000	1500	2000		4000	6600	24150	250	750	5150	9150	9150	10650	17550	24150
81	▲12	(Scotland) Scott Donaldson	0	12866	3575	0	500	0	0	0	0		0	6600	10675	12866	15616	16416	16416	16416	16416	16941	23541
82	▼11	(Thailand) Noppon Saengkham	0	0	400		0	4000	0	0	0		12500	6600	23500	0	0	4400	4400	4400	4400	16900	23500
83	▼14	(England) Chris Wakelin	0	0	2100	1000	0	4000	4000	0	0		4000	6600	21700	1000	2050	6575	10575	11100	11100	15100	21700
84	▼19	(England) Nigel Bond	0	0	2625	250	500	0	0	1500	0		4000	9900	18775	250	750	750	1650	3375	4875	8875	18775
85	▲12	(England) Zak Surety	0	10666	1950	0	500	0	0	1500	0		0	0	3950	10666	11691	11691	12216	13116	14616	14616	14616
86	▲6	(England) Michael Wasley	0	13582	0	500	500	0	0	0	0		0	0	1000	14082	14582	14582	14582	14582	14582	14582	14582
87	New entry	(Wales) Daniel Wells	0	0	4050	250	0	4000	4000	0	2000		0	0	14300	250	1150	5675	11400	12300	12300	14300	14300
88	▲6	(England) Barry Pinches	0	12839	800	0	0	0	0	0	0		0	0	800	12839	12839	13639	13639	13639	13639	13639	13639
89	▲37	(Iran) Hossein Vafaei Ayouri	0	0	525	4500	2000	0	0	0	0		0	6600	13625	4500	6500	6500	6500	7025	7025	7025	13625
90	New entry	(England) Sean O'Sullivan	0	0	5000	250	0	4000	4000	0	0		0	0	13250	250	2875	8200	12725	12725	12725	13250	13250
91	▲5	(England) Chris Melling	0	10832	1425		500	0	0	0	0		0	0	1925	10832	11332	11332	12232	12757	12757	12757	12757
92	New entry	(Isle of Man) Darryl Hill	0	0	1050	0	0	4000	0	0	0		6500	0	11550	0	525	4525	5050	5050	5050	11550	11550
93	▲12	(Scotland) Michael Leslie	0	7972	1950	1000	500	0	0		0		0	0	3450	8972	9472	10372	10897	11422	11422	11422	11422
94	▲4	(Malta) Tony Drago	0	10416	525		0		0	0	0			0	525	10416	10941	10941	10941	10941	10941	10941	10941
95	New entry	(Scotland) Rhys Clark	0	0	1575	250	0	0	0	1500	0		6500	0	9825	250	250	775	1300	1300	2800	9825	9825
96	▲7	(Thailand) Thanawat Thirapongpaiboon	0	8000	800		0	0	0	0					800	8000	8000	8800	8800	8800	8800	8800	8800
97	New entry	(England) Sanderson Lam	0	0	1450	250	0	7000	0	0	0		0	0	8700	250	775	8700	8700	8700	8700	8700	8700
98	New entry	(China) Zhang Yong	0	0	900	0	500	0	0	0	0		0	6600	8000	0	500	1400	1400	1400	1400	1400	8000
99	New entry	(England) Paul Davison	0	0	400	250	500	0	0	0	0		0	6600	7750	250	750	1150	1150	1150	1150	1150	7750
100	▲14	(China) Lu Ning	0	3067	0	250	2000	0	0	1500	0		0	0	3750	3317	5317	5317	5317	5317	6817	6817	6817
101	New entry	(England) Sydney Wilson	0	0	0	250	500	0	4000	0	2000		0	0	6750	250	750	750	4750	4750	4750	6750	6750
102	New entry	(Pakistan) Hamza Akbar	0	0	0			0	0	0	0		0	6600	6600	0	0	0	0	0	0	0	6600
103	▲3	(England) Steve Davis (Note: Stephen Hendry, Steve Davis and James Wattana received Invitational Tour Cards to compete in events, where there are places available.)	0	6583	0									0	0	6583	6583	6583	6583	6583	6583	6583	6583
104	▲12	(England) Steven Hallworth	0	2416	525	250	0	0	0	3000	0		0	0	3775	2666	2666	2666	2666	2666	5666	6191	6191
105	▲20	(Malaysia) Thor Chuan Leong	0	0	5925		0	0	0	0	0		0	0	5925	0	2250	2775	3300	4200	4200	5925	5925
106	▲17	(Thailand) James Wattana	0	400	400		500	0	0	0	0		4000	0	4900	400	900	1300	1300	1300	1300	5300	5300
107	▲8	(England) Ian Glover	0	2966	925	250	0	0	0	0	0		0	0	1175	3216	3216	3616	3616	4141	4141	4141	4141
108	▲5	(China) Lu Chenwei	0	3600	525	0	0	0	0	0	0		0	0	525	3600	3600	4125	4125	4125	4125	4125	4125
109	New entry	(England) Michael Wild	0	0	0		0	4000	0	0	0		0	0	4000	0	0	4000	4000	4000	4000	4000	4000
110	▼25	(England) James Cahill	0	0	1450	250	0	0	0	0	2000		0	0	3700	250	775	1700	1700	1700	1700	3700	3700
111	▼4	(England) Allan Taylor	0	0	0	1000	500	0	0	0	2000		0	0	3500	1000	1500	1500	1500	1500	1500	3500	3500
112	New entry	(Wales) Gareth Allen	0	0	525	250	2000	0	0	0	0		0	0	2775	250	2250	2250	2250	2250	2250	2775	2775
113	New entry	(Scotland) Eden Sharav	0	0	1950	250	500	0	0	0	0		0	0	2700	250	1275	1275	2175	2175	2175	2700	2700
114	▲4	(China) Rouzi Maimaiti	0	1700	400										400	1700	1700	2100	2100	2100	2100	2100	2100
115	New entry	(England) Jason Weston	0	0	2100	0	0	0	0	0	0		0	0	2100	0	525	1050	1575	2100	2100	2100	2100
116	▼39	(Scotland) Fraser Patrick	0	0	1050	500	500	0	0		0		0	0	2050	500	1525	1525	1525	1525	1525	2050	2050
117	▲3	(China) Ju Reti	0	1400	0										0	1400	1400	1400	1400	1400	1400	1400	1400
118	New entry	(Wales) Duane Jones	0	0	525	250	0		0	0	0		0	0	775	250	775	775	775	775	775	775	775
119	New entry	(Australia) Vinnie Calabrese	0	0	0	250	500	0	0	0	0		0		750	250	750	750	750	750	750	750	750
120	▲2	(China) Liu Chuang	0	600	0										0	600	600	600	600	600	600	600	600
121	▼51	(England) Jimmy White	0	0	0	0	500	0	0	0	0		0	0	500	0	500	500	500	500	500	500	500
122	▲5	(Australia) Steve Mifsud	0	0	0										0	0	0	0	0	0	0	0	0
123	New entry	(Thailand) Akani Songsermsawad	0	0	0									0	0	0	0	0	0	0	0	0	0
124	New entry	(Brazil) Itaro Santos	0	0	0				0	0	0		0		0	0	0	0	0	0	0	0	0
125	New entry	(Egypt) Hatem Yassen	0	0	0			0	0	0	0		0	0	0	0	0	0	0	0	0	0	0
126	▼42	(Brazil) Igor Figueiredo	0	0	0									0	0	0	0	0	0	0	0	0	0
127	▲1	(Scotland) Stephen Hendry	0	0	0										0	0	0	0	0	0	0	0	0

Player did not enter tournament.
Player is still participating in tournament.
