= 2014–15 snooker world ranking points =

Preceded by 2013/2014	2014/2015	Succeeded by 2015/2016

The official 2014/2015 snooker world ranking points for the professional snooker players on the World Snooker Main Tour in the 2014–15 season are based on performances in ranking and minor-ranking tournaments over a two-year rolling period. Following an overhaul of the world rankings it is the first season where the tariffs are based on prize money. Rather than being awarded points according to tariffs preset by the governing body as in previous seasons, the players are now ranked by their prize money earnings in tournaments that carry ranking status. The only exception to this is when a player loses their first match: for the 2012/2013 and 2013/2014 seasons only half the money earned for the event counts towards the player's ranking, and for the 2014/2015 season a player will not receive any points at all for that tournament. Due to the transition to the new ranking system, the start ranks of the 2014/2015 season for the top 64 players are incongruent with the ranks of the players at the end of the previous season.

The rankings at the start of 2014/2015 season are determined by prize money earned in the 2012/2013 and 2013/2014 seasons and updated after every tournament carrying ranking status. As points are earned from tournaments throughout the current season, the points from the corresponding tournaments from two seasons previous are dropped. The rankings set the official seedings at the start of the season and at six further stages. The total points accumulated by the cut-off dates for the revised seedings are based on all the points up to that date in the 2014/2015 season, all of the points from the 2013/2014 season, and the points from the 2012/2013 season that have not yet been dropped. The total points from the 2013/2014 and 2014/2015 seasons set the rankings at the start of the 2015/2016 season.

== Seeding revisions ==
Cut-off point	Date	After	2012/2013 points dropped
1	6 July 2014	Australian Goldfields Open	Wuxi Classic, Australian Goldfields Open; APTC (1)
2	15 September 2014	Shanghai Masters	Shanghai Masters; PTC (1 · 2 · 3), APTC (2), ET (1 · 2)
3	3 November 2014	International Championship	International Championship; APTC (3), ET (3)
4	8 December 2014	UK Championship	UK Championship; PTC (4), ET (4)
5	9 February 2015	German Masters	German Masters, World Open; ET (5)
6	7 April 2015	China Open	Welsh Open, China Open; ET (6), PTC (Finals)
Total	5 May 2015	World Championship	World Championship

== Ranking points ==
No.	Ch (Note: "Ch" = Change since the beginning of the 2014/2015 season. See for the player rankings at the start of the season.)	Player	Season (Note: The 2012/2013 points only include the ranking points that count towards the next seedings update. All new players or players regaining a place on the tour started on 0 points.)		Tournament											Season	Start	Cut-off point (Note: See for the rankings at the first seedings cut-off point; see for the rankings at the second; see for the rankings at the third; see for the rankings at the fourth; see for the rankings at the fifth; see for the rankings at the sixth.)						Total
No.	Ch	Player	12/13	13/14	PTC	WUC	AO	SM	IC	UK	GM	WEO	IO	CO	WC	14/15	Start	1	2	3	4	5	6	Total
1	Steady	(England) Mark Selby	0	519216	35499	6500		19500	0	3000	66667	5000		85000	20000	241166	774089	768178	796866	783507	659420	707266	756382	760382
2	▲10	(England) Stuart Bingham	0	110983	36934	8000	9444	85000	12000	30000	4167	5000		6500	300000	497045	276081	251714	325253	333166	348083	343886	332078	608028
3	Steady	(Australia) Neil Robertson	0	400333	34249	85000	17778	0	7000	12000	8333	5000		3000	30000	202360	680748	774096	758512	702031	698018	672447	578693	602693
4	▼2	(China) Ding Junhui	0	492600	15500	0		19500	0	9000	2500	0	2000	21000	30000	99500	700671	699741	709077	697586	700336	678541	586150	592100
5	▼1	(England) Ronnie O'Sullivan	0	255616	1917			0	17500	150000	8333	2500		0	30000	210250	505616	505616	507533	525033	675033	683366	685866	465866
6	▲1	(England) Shaun Murphy	0	187916	55249	12500	6667	8000	7000	12000	29167	1500		12500	125000	269583	366405	372927	359810	357643	339485	352940	356549	457499
7	▼1	(England) Judd Trump	0	134916	46916	8000	41667	0	7000	70000	8333	5000	6000	8000	60000	260916	407322	449489	428331	311857	368723	366999	387832	395832
8	▼3	(England) Barry Hawkins	0	257933	16000	21000	0	0	7000	3000	2500	1500	0	12500	60000	123500	498199	468189	461989	467902	457815	442933	446433	381433
9	▲6	(England) Joe Perry	0	147890	121166	35000	0	0	7000	9000	4167	2500	9000	3000	20000	210833	198065	224154	208476	215329	221571	235140	342823	358723
10	Steady	(England) Ricky Walden	0	110444	13283	6500	9444	0	125000	12000	0	10000	25000	6500	0	207727	296860	235393	230893	339323	346982	334175	370171	318171
11	▼3	(Hong Kong) Marco Fu	0	215800	12016	12500		0	17500	20000	1250	10000	0	6500	20000	99766	342873	341363	332679	330515	341432	307957	311566	315566
12	▼3	(Northern Ireland) Mark Allen	0	140000	38833		0	35000	65000	9000	4167	2500		0	20000	174500	305118	297618	353760	391876	397135	312000	300500	314500
13	▼2	(Scotland) John Higgins	0	144050	10783	6500	6667	0	3000	12000	2500	60000	6000	12500	20000	139950	284959	298326	223322	222427	209318	193083	270000	284000
14	▲4	(Wales) Mark Williams	0	91583	57150	6500		8000	30000	9000	2500	20000	13500	8000	0	154650	163388	159088	145405	171518	178014	178233	252233	246233
15	▼1	(Scotland) Stephen Maguire	0	76266	36533	12500	0	8000	3000	30000	16667	10000		8000	0	124700	217476	226976	212630	204630	228030	255053	206966	200966
16	▲4	(England) Robert Milkins	0	74966	24250	6500	9444	0	30000	9000	0	0	9000	12500	12000	112694	161864	168665	161899	182982	193891	183414	191660	187660
17	▲10	(Wales) Michael White	0	57887	12583	6500		12000	17500	3000	1250	2500	50000	8000	6000	119333	115938	112652	121565	136087	131570	130520	195270	177220
18	▼1	(Scotland) Graeme Dott	0	92233	6783	6500		12000	3000	20000	0	2500	6000	6500	20000	83283	176583	173683	176305	176827	184827	174208	171516	175516
19	▼3	(England) Mark Davis	0	76858	25516		11111	0	7000	20000	2500	1500	9000	6500	12000	95127	188163	167814	161927	160469	153923	157380	175985	171985
20	▲1	(Wales) Ryan Day	0	94905	11749	8000	0	8000	7000	3000	8333	1500	2000	6500	12000	68082	146443	149363	146963	148259	140842	142545	155087	162987
21	▲2	(China) Xiao Guodong	0	101304	5517	3000	11111	0	12000	3000	4167	1500		0	9000	49295	138177	147515	144391	155641	152550	154590	143899	150599
22	▲4	(China) Liang Wenbo	0	84900	5834	8000	5000	6000	0	3000	16667	2500	2000	3000	9000	61001	126689	134116	137505	135505	131944	145579	145101	145901
23	▲6	(Scotland) Alan McManus	0	71205	13084	8000	6667	12000	3000	0	1250	5000	2000	3000	12000	66001	112988	122082	135132	138908	138321	131876	137206	137206
24	▲21	(Scotland) Anthony McGill	0	46445	15000	3000	417	1750	7000	20000	2500	1500	3000	6500	30000	90667	76520	77901	82364	88473	105495	101803	109412	137112
25	▼3	(England) Michael Holt	0	79892	21083	8000	0	8000	0	3000	2500	0	0	0	9000	51583	139705	141882	145586	144095	139187	128866	134475	131475
26	▲4	(England) Martin Gould	0	47777	25000	21000	6667	8000	7000	3000	4167	2500			0	77334	112148	127170	120375	133875	128784	125908	137111	125111
27	▲4	(Republic of Ireland) Fergal O'Brien	0	70099	6583	3000	6667	12000	7000	0	2500	0	2000	3000	9000	51750	111263	112787	118800	119383	113209	114099	116949	121849
28	▼9	(Wales) Matthew Stevens	0	64433	1749	0	9444	0	3000	9000	0	5000	2000	3000	20000	53193	163258	166272	161655	152638	144034	101213	103626	117626
29	▼16	(England) Ali Carter	0	86050	0	0				0	0	5000	0	3000	20000	28000	222125	216714	203114	193768	167581	115441	110050	114050
30	▲18	(England) Matthew Selt	0	32257	30900	3000	0	6000	3000	12000	2500	2500	3000	3000	12000	77900	69543	60598	68148	73311	80811	91457	110157	110157
31	▼6	(England) Peter Ebdon	0	41750	17333	0	6667	0	12000	9000	4167	2500	3000	6500	6000	67167	129520	110697	107830	95743	101985	101417	114917	108917
32	▲8	(England) Ben Woollaston	0	42754	4949	6500	0	1750	3000	9000	1250	30000	3000	0	6000	65449	86874	91724	89037	90723	92642	92434	114203	108203
33	▼9	(Wales) Dominic Dale	0	66741	10583	0	5000	8000	3000	0	0	0	0	6500	6000	39083	130848	127237	125912	117295	110204	103144	111824	105824
34	▲34	(England) Gary Wilson	0	42576	2532	3000	417	0	0	0	1250	10000	2000	35000	6000	60199	42576	45993	47159	47742	47742	49775	96775	102775
35	▲2	(England) David Gilbert	0	59133	5083	3000	0	0	7000	9000	2500	0	2000	8000	6000	42583	92401	91815	89690	93690	98190	95299	103916	101716
36	▼8	(England) Mark King	0	57267	15400	3000	0	0	0	0	4167	1500	2000	6500	9000	41567	113586	114793	107076	105806	96523	97229	105834	98834
37	▼3	(Norway) Kurt Maflin	0	48897	4083	3000	0	1750	3000	3000	0	0	0	21000	12000	47833	93888	95588	96157	96153	97966	94994	92930	96730
38	▲17	(Wales) Jamie Jones	0	41800	5866	6500	6667	2500	3000	0	1250	2500	6000	8000	12000	54283	61366	72940	68636	71886	70878	71991	86383	96083
39	Steady	(England) Rod Lawler	0	39871	14499	3000	0	1750	12000	12000	1250	1500	3000	0	6000	54999	88294	83794	76253	88445	97687	96333	97070	94870
40	▲4	(Northern Ireland) Gerard Greene	0	66727	3332	0	0	0	0	3000	1250	1500	3000	3000	6000	21082	77704	74118	73743	73993	75393	76476	81809	87809
41	▲13	(England) Jimmy Robertson	0	37138	17583	0	889	6000	3000	3000	2500	1500	0	3000	12000	49472	63722	62311	63103	69933	70942	73297	79210	86610
42	▲16	(England) Mike Dunn	0	51287	5166	0	889	2500	3000	3000	0	0	2000	6500	6000	29055	56787	56926	60259	65259	68842	67342	74342	80342
43	▲4	(Thailand) Dechawat Poomjaeng	0	39996	7065	0	0	2500	3000	9000	0	1500	3000	8000	6000	40065	69737	70737	75562	78758	86950	84369	90061	80061
44	▲19	(Belgium) Luca Brecel	0	25099	13832	0	5000	2500	0	3000	0	20000	3000	0	6000	53332	48850	52350	54442	55884	42493	42489	72431	78431
45	▼12	(Republic of Ireland) Ken Doherty	0	43005	583	3000	0	6000	0	9000	1250	1500	2000	3000	9000	35333	102712	93389	93702	84615	90661	86025	73438	78338
46	▼5	(Scotland) Jamie Burnett	0	41367	2083	3000	0	0	17500	0	0	0	2000	3000	9000	36583	85598	76168	66976	77085	74335	70404	71250	77950
47	▼9	(England) Mark Joyce	0	41965	3949	3000	6667	0	3000	3000	1250	1500	3000	3000	6000	34366	89702	97869	94148	96848	87540	79922	78531	76331
48	▼12	(England) Andrew Higginson	0	41943	4083	0	5000	6000	3000	3000	0	0	0	3000	9000	33083	93344	92933	95279	91271	91274	80017	70126	75026
49	▲10	(Thailand) Thepchaiya Un-Nooh	0	31713	13532	0	0	2500	3000	0	0	1500	13500	0	6000	40032	53160	54160	55326	56048	50370	52349	70345	71745
50	▲12	(England) Robbie Williams	0	40915	4832	3000	417	1750	3000	3000	1250	0	0	0	12000	29249	49375	52792	53317	56343	59726	59472	58164	70164
51	▲20	(Republic of Ireland) David Morris	0	40933	583	3000	0	1750	3000	12000	1250	1500	3000	3000	0	29083	40933	43933	45683	48683	60683	62516	70016	70016
52	Steady	(China) Yu Delu	0	41969	2100	3000	0	0	3000	3000	1250	1500	2000	3000	9000	27850	65188	69088	66897	67397	64110	63660	69019	69819
53	▼11	(England) Jack Lisowski	0	28583	1749	6500	5000	6000	0	9000	0	0	0	6500	6000	40749	83940	88317	88750	87605	87527	85810	75332	69332
54	▼5	(India) Aditya Mehta	0	48985	5417	0	889	0	3000	3000	1250	2500	3000	0	0	19056	68350	66939	67356	57965	60961	64128	68041	68041
55	▲30	(China) Li Hang	0	24894	2883	0	417	6000	12000	0	2500	1500	6000	0	9000	40300	24894	26811	33394	45994	45994	48694	56194	65194
56	▲14	(England) Kyren Wilson	0	41752	3749	0	0	1750	3000	3000	0	0	6000	3000	0	20499	41752	41752	44502	48085	51668	52251	62251	62251
57	▲4	(England) Peter Lines	0	42418	2200	3000	0	0	0	3000	0	0	2000	3000	6000	19200	50220	51120	49729	49729	53529	49618	55618	61618
58	▼7	(England) Anthony Hamilton	0	43401	3498	6500		0	0	3000	0	0	2000	3000	0	17998	66805	72155	71371	68367	67863	63394	63699	61399
59	▼27	(England) Tom Ford	0	38241	3083	0	5000	0	0	3000	0	0	2000	0	9000	22083	104943	96513	88726	83748	77684	77991	55424	60324
60	▼14	(China) Cao Yupeng	0	34797	1983	8000	417	1750	0	0	0	1500	2000	3000	6000	24650	72205	74192	70555	57655	50347	49447	53447	59447
61	▲34	(Finland) Robin Hull	0	15600	1166	12500	0	400		3000	0	1500	2000	8000	12000	40566	15600	28100	28500	28500	31500	32083	44166	56166
62	▼9	(England) Rory McLeod	0	32733	1166	3000	5000	1750	0	9000	0	1500	2000	0	0	23416	64034	64911	63716	62966	64702	62840	58449	56149
63	▲16	(England) Stuart Carrington	0	31677	4417	0	889	2500	0	0	1250	0	3000	0	12000	24056	31677	32566	35066	35649	37566	38816	43733	55733
64	▲30	(Northern Ireland) Joe Swail	0	15610	5083	0	889	6000	12000	0	0	0	3000	3000	9000	38972	15610	16499	23499	36082	37999	38999	45582	54582
65	▼8	(England) Nigel Bond	0	29491	2749	0	417	0	3000	9000	0	0	6000	3000	0	24166	58928	53772	51072	51655	59847	50648	55957	53657
66	▼23	(England) Jamie Cope	0	31624	4332	3000		2500	0	3000	0	2500	3000	3000	0	21332	78025	67095	61278	59970	60042	53973	57056	52956
67	▼17	(England) Alfie Burden	0	37249	2666	0	417	0	0	3000	4167	1500	0	3000	0	14750	67091	65808	60217	56822	59035	62090	60199	51999
68	▼33	(Scotland) Marcus Campbell	0	23871	783	3000	5000	0	0	3000	1250	1500	2000	3000	6000	25533	93490	78667	69776	68276	67548	59821	55404	49404
69	▲37	(England) Chris Wakelin	0	8249	14416	6500	0	1750	0	0	0	1500	9000	0	6000	39166	8249	14749	19416	19999	23332	23332	41415	47415
70	▼6	(England) Jimmy White	0	30133	4666	0	0	0	3000	3000	0	0	0	0	6000	16666	48692	47942	44044	49211	51611	49390	48999	46799
71	▲13	(Thailand) Noppon Saengkham	0	24938	5133	0	0	1750	7000	0	0	0	0	0	6000	19883	24938	25538	28288	35488	35488	38821	38821	44821
72	▼5	(England) Sam Baird	0	0	3915	6500	417	1750	12000	0	1250	2500	2000	0	6000	36332	0	6917	9833	22416	22999	25249	30332	36332
73	▲5	(England) Craig Steadman	0	0	6716	3000	83	400	7000	0	1250	0	0	0	12000	30449	0	3283	3683	11283	12283	17866	18449	30449
74	▲9	(England) Liam Highfield	0	0	4666	0	5000	400	3000	3000	2500	1500	0	3000	6000	29066	0	5000	6983	10566	14149	16649	23066	29066
75	New entry	(China) Zhou Yuelong	0	0	3300	3000	83	400	7000	0	0	0	2000	6500	6000	28283	0	3283	3683	11283	12283	13783	22283	28283
76	▲20	(England) Alex Davies	0	14694	2000	0	0	2500	0	0	0	0	0	3000	6000	13500	14694	14694	17194	17194	17194	18194	22194	28194
77	▲42	(Scotland) Fraser Patrick	0	1749	5100	3000	0	0	0	9000	1250	0	2000	0	6000	26350	1749	5349	7266	8266	18266	20099	22099	28099
78	New entry	(England) Oliver Lines	0	0	14500	3000	83	0	3000	0	1250	0	0	0	6000	27833	0	4083	4083	13083	13666	15916	21833	27833
79	▼19	(England) Dave Harold	0	23350	583	0	0	0		0	0	1500	0	0		2083	51147	43861	39774	36383	34205	29511	27733	25433
80	▲23	(Wales) Andrew Pagett	0	8916	1000	0	417	0	3000	0	1250	0	3000		6000	14667	8916	9333	9333	13333	13333	14583	17583	23583
81	▲12	(China) Lyu Haotian	0	16600	400	0	889	400	0	3000	0	0	2000	0	0	6689	16600	17689	18089	18089	21089	21289	23289	23289
82	▼16	(China) Tian Pengfei	0	0	6616			1750	0	0	1250	1500	6000	0	6000	23116	0	200	5283	6783	7366	9616	17116	23116
83	▼6	(China) Zhang Anda	0	0	1966			0	0	3000	1250	0	0	3000	12000	21216	0	600	600	600	4183	5633	9216	21216
84	▲25	(Brazil) Igor Figueiredo	0	5000	583					3000	1250	0	0	0	9000	13833	5000	5000	5000	5000	8000	9250	9833	18833
85	▲32	(England) James Cahill	0	2000	2783	0	417	0	0	12000	1250	0	0	0	0	16450	2000	2617	4200	5200	17200	18450	18450	18450
86	▲12	(England) John Astley	0	14110	583	0	417	1750	0	0	0	1500	0	0	0	4250	14110	14527	16277	16277	16277	16860	18360	18360
87	▼7	(England) Joel Walker	0	0	3083	0	83	400	3000	9000	0	0	2000	0	0	17566	0	83	1066	4066	13066	14983	17566	17566
88	New entry	(England) Mitchell Mann	0	0	1366			0	7000	0	0	0	0	0	9000	17366	0	0	0	7783	7783	8366	8366	17366
89	▼16	(England) Ian Burns	0	0	783	0	889	1750	12000	0	1250	0	0	0	0	16672	0	889	2639	14839	14839	16672	16672	16672
90	New entry	(England) Michael Georgiou	0	0	1366	6500	0	400	0	0	2500	5000	0	0	0	15766	0	6700	7100	7100	7683	10183	15766	15766
91	▲21	(England) Elliot Slessor	0	4818	3166	0	417	0	0	0	0	0	0	6500	0	10083	4818	5235	5235	6235	6818	8401	14901	14901
92	▼20	(England) Michael Wasley	0	0	6082	0	0	2500	0	0	2500	2500	0	0	0	13582	0	0	3666	6999	7999	11082	13582	13582
93	▼28	(Scotland) Scott Donaldson	0	0	4466	3000	5000	400	0	0	0	0	0	0	0	12866	0	9500	10900	12083	12666	12866	12866	12866
94	▼18	(England) Barry Pinches	0	0	2800	3000	889	400	3000	0	1250	1500	0	0	0	12839	0	4089	4489	8089	8089	11339	12839	12839
95	▲33	(Wales) Jak Jones	0	0	2166	0	83	400		0	0	0	0	0	9000	11649	0	83	2066	2066	2649	2649	2649	11649
96	New entry	(England) Chris Melling	0	0	3332	3000	0	0	3000	0	0	1500	0	0	0	10832	0	3000	4166	7749	8749	8749	10832	10832
97	New entry	(England) Zak Surety	0	0	1166	0	0	0	3000	0	0	0	0	6500	0	10666	0	0	0	3583	3583	3583	10666	10666
98	▼10	(Malta) Tony Drago	0	0	2766	3000		400		3000	1250	0			0	10416	0	3600	5166	5166	8166	9416	10416	10416
99	▲14	(Scotland) Ross Muir	0	4302	4200	0	83	0	0	0	1250	0	0	0	0	5533	4302	4985	4985	5985	5985	8835	9835	9835
100	▲4	(England) Hammad Miah	0	8860	0	0	0	400	0	0	0	0	0	0	0	400	8860	8860	9260	9260	9260	9260	9260	9260
101	▲6	(Malta) Alex Borg	0	6166	583	0	0	400	0	0		1500			0	2483	6166	6166	7149	7149	7149	7149	8649	8649
102	▲8	(England) Andrew Norman	0	4960	200	3000	0	0	0	0		0			0	3200	4960	8160	8160	8160	8160	8160	8160	8160
103	▼16	(Thailand) Thanawat Thirapongpaiboon	0	0	0			0		0	0	0	2000	0	6000	8000	0	0	0	0	0	0	2000	8000
104	New entry	(Wales) Lee Walker	0	0	0	0	83	400	0	0	0	1500	0	0	6000	7983	0	83	483	483	483	483	1983	7983
105	▼4	(Scotland) Michael Leslie	0	0	583	0	889	0	0	0	0	0	0	6500	0	7972	0	889	1472	1472	1472	1472	7972	7972
106	▼37	(England) Steve Davis (Note: Stephen Hendry, Steve Davis and James Wattana received Invitational Tour Cards to compete in events, where there are places available.)	0	0	583			0		0	0				6000	6583	0	0	583	583	583	583	583	6583
107	▲16	(England) Allan Taylor	0	833	2749	0	417	400	0	0	0	0	2000	0	0	5566	833	1250	2816	3399	3399	4399	6399	6399
108	▲14	(England) Lee Page	0	1260	1200	3000	0	400	0	0		0	0	0	0	4600	1260	4460	4860	4860	5860	5860	5860	5860
109	▼1	(England) Chris Norbury	0	5167	583	0	0	0	0	0	0	0	0	0	0	583	5167	5167	5167	5750	5750	5750	5750	5750
110	▲1	(Thailand) Ratchayothin Yotharuck	0	4850	583	0	0	0	0	0	0					583	4850	4850	5433	5433	5433	5433	5433	5433
111	▼21	(England) David Grace	0	0	2166	3000	0	0	0	0	0	0	0	0	0	5166	0	4000	4000	4583	5166	5166	5166	5166
112	▲3	(China) Cao Xinlong	0	3650	1400	0	0	0	0	0	0	0	0	0		1400	3650	4250	4250	4450	4450	5050	5050	5050
113	New entry	(China) Lu Chenwei	0	0	600	3000	0	0	0	0	0	0	0	0	0	3600	0	3200	3200	3400	3400	3600	3600	3600
114	New entry	(China) Lu Ning	0	0	1400	0	417	0	0	0	1250	0	0	0	0	3067	0	617	617	1217	1217	3067	3067	3067
115	New entry	(England) Ian Glover	0	0	2966	0	0	0	0	0	0	0	0	0	0	2966	0	600	1600	2383	2966	2966	2966	2966
116	New entry	(England) Steven Hallworth	0	0	583	0	83	1750	0	0	0	0	0	0	0	2416	0	83	1833	1833	1833	1833	2416	2416
117	▲13	(Qatar) Ahmed Saif	0	0	200			0	0	0		1500	0	0	0	1700	0	0	0	0	0	200	1700	1700
118	New entry	(China) Rouzi Maimaiti	0	0	1700					0						1700	0	0	0	200	200	1700	1700	1700
119	▲1	(Switzerland) Alexander Ursenbacher	0	1600	0	0	83	0	0	0	0	0	0	0	0	83	1600	1683	1683	1683	1683	1683	1683	1683
120	New entry	(China) Ju Reti	0	0	1400											1400	0	200	200	800	800	1400	1400	1400
121	▲3	(England) Ryan Clark	0	694	0	0	0	0								0	694	694	694	694	694	694	694	694
122	▼41	(China) Liu Chuang	0	0	600	0	0		0	0						600	0	600	600	600	600	600	600	600
123	▼48	(Thailand) James Wattana	0	0	0			400	0	0		0		0	0	400	0	0	400	400	400	400	400	400
124	▲7	(Libya) Khaled Belaid Abumdas	0	0	0											0	0	0	0	0	0	0	0	0
125	New entry	(Malaysia) Thor Chuan Leong	0	0	0							0	0	0	0	0	0	0	0	0	0	0	0	0
126	Steady	(Iran) Hossein Vafaei Ayouri	0	0	0										0	0	0	0	0	0	0	0	0	0
127	New entry	(Australia) Steve Mifsud	0	0	0											0	0	0	0	0	0	0	0	0
128	▼1	(Scotland) Stephen Hendry	0	0	0											0	0	0	0	0	0	0	0	0

Player did not enter tournament.
Player is still participating in tournament.
