= 2013–14 snooker world ranking points =

Preceded by 2012/2013	2013/2014	Succeeded by 2014/2015

The official 2013/2014 snooker world ranking points for the professional snooker players on the World Snooker Main Tour in the 2013–14 season are based on performances in ranking and minor-ranking tournaments over a two-year rolling period. The total points from the 2011/2012 and 2012/2013 seasons set the rankings at the start of 2013/2014 season and are updated after every tournament carrying ranking points. As points are accrued from tournaments in the current season, the points from the corresponding tournaments from two seasons ago are dropped. The rankings set the official seedings at the start of the season and at six further points during the season. The total points accumulated by the cut-off dates for the revised seedings are based on all the points up to that date in the 2013/2014 season, all of the points from the 2012/2013 season, and the points from the 2011/2012 season that have not yet been dropped.

== Seeding revisions ==
Cut-off point	Date	After	2011/2012 points dropped
1	22 July 2013	Rotterdam Open	Australian Goldfields Open; PTC (1)
2	23 September 2013	Shanghai Masters	Shanghai Masters; PTC (2 · 3 · 4)
3	4 November 2013	International Championship	PTC (5 · 6 · 7 · 8)
4	9 December 2013	UK Championship	UK Championship; PTC (9 · 10)
5	3 February 2014	German Masters	German Masters; PTC (11 · 12)
6	31 March 2014	Players Tour Championship – Finals	Welsh Open, World Open; PTC (Finals)
Total	6 May 2014	World Championship	China Open, World Championship

== Ranking points ==
No.	Ch (Note: "Ch" = Change since the beginning of the season 2013/2014. See for the player rankings at the start of the season.)	Player	Season (Note: The 2011/2012 points only include the ranking points that count towards the next seedings update. All 36 new players will start on 0 points. Players on 0 points are ranked alphabetically. See for the points accumulated during the 2011/2012 season and see for points accumulated during the 2012/2013 season.)		Tournament												Season	Cut-off point (Note: See for the rankings at the first seedings cut-off point; see for the rankings at the second cut-off point; see for the rankings at the third cut-off point; see for the rankings at the fourth cut-off point; see for the rankings at the fifth cut-off point; see for the rankings at the sixth cut-off point; see for the rankings at the end of the season.)						Total
No.	Ch	Player	11/12	12/13	PTC	WUC	AO	SM	IO	IC	UK	GM	WEO	WOO	CO	WC	13/14	1	2	3	4	5	6	Total
1	Steady	(England) Mark Selby	0	43260	8600	560	3200	3500	1400	4000	6400	1400	2500	5600	3500	10000	50660	83640	78100	82220	87020	85160	84480	93920
2	Steady	(Australia) Neil Robertson	0	42440	4360	7000	4000	3500	2500	3040	8000	1400	1400	2660	5600	6400	49860	90160	86580	87680	89800	89300	88800	92300
3	▲7	(China) Ding Junhui	0	34320	6800	1960	0	7000	5000	8000	3040	5000	4000	2660	7000	1400	51860	59920	64700	79500	79540	82520	83660	86180
4	▲5	(England) Barry Hawkins	0	39020	6680	1960	1900	4480	900	2240	4000	1400	3200	1960	1260	6400	36380	63085	65480	66620	69700	68980	73500	75400
5	▼1	(England) Shaun Murphy	0	40320	6260	560	1900	2660	400	1440	3040	1900	1400	7000	2660	5000	34220	68600	68680	67400	66440	64420	69260	74540
6	▲11	(Hong Kong) Marco Fu	0	33725	6480	1960	5000	2660	1400	6400	640	900	2500	4480	1960	3800	38180	57110	60565	67805	64645	63850	69750	71905
7	▼4	(England) Judd Trump	0	41100	7560	1260		980	400	1440	3040	4000	1900	2660	1960	5000	30200	78200	75640	74760	69960	70460	71640	71300
8	▼2	(England) Stuart Bingham	0	40600	8000	1960	1900	980	1900	3040	5120	900	1900	1960	1260	1400	30320	61800	60760	64540	69500	68140	72320	70920
9	▼1	(England) Ricky Walden	0	36040	5440	1260	700	980	1400	640	5120	400	1900	2660	3500	3800	27800	61710	63365	62685	62485	58985	60350	63840
10	▼3	(Northern Ireland) Mark Allen	0	32120	7260	1260		980	1400	3040	4000	900	1400	4480	1260	3800	29780	61220	59260	63700	63700	61340	59220	61900
11	Steady	(Scotland) John Higgins	0	27035	7060	5600		2660	1900	2240	3040	1400	2500	3500	2660	1400	33960	64575	62415	64155	62235	61375	63395	60995
12	▲1	(England) Mark Davis	0	33150	5560		2500	3500	1900	3040	1440	2500	900	1960	560	1400	25260	56080	56020	60440	59440	58980	60055	58410
13	▲7	(England) Joe Perry	0	21900	5940	3500	2500	1960	1900	5120	3040	2500	3200	1260	560	3800	35280	50300	50375	55515	57995	56995	58580	57180
14	▲2	(England) Ali Carter	0	31195	2960	2660		1960	900	1440	2240	900	1900	1960	4480	3800	25200	54295	55795	57015	56815	56455	59615	56395
15	▼3	(Scotland) Graeme Dott	0	29520	4800	1260		980	400	5120	3040	1400	1400	3500	3500	1150	26550	55100	53100	57340	57140	55000	55480	56070
16	▲2	(England) Robert Milkins	0	31735	4520	4480	3200	2660	400	1440	3040	400	400	1960	560	1150	24210	57005	57285	58765	59925	58615	57165	55945
17	▼12	(Scotland) Stephen Maguire	0	32420	5480			980	3200	1440	4000	1400	1900	1260	1260	1400	22320	66480	66360	70200	69840	64480	64080	54740
18	▼3	(Wales) Mark Williams	0	26580	7020	2660		805	1900	2240	2240	1400	1900	1960	1960	1150	25235	54920	50405	55105	55065	53045	55165	51815
19	▲12	(Wales) Ryan Day	0	20670	6260	1260	1400	2660	900	4000	640	3200	900	1960	1260	3800	28240	42715	42615	46435	45795	46675	49655	48910
20	▲6	(England) Michael Holt	0	22440	5920	560	700	4480	1400	640	2240	2500	1400	1960	1260	2800	25860	43425	45205	47285	47565	47740	47100	48300
21	▲11	(China) Liang Wenbo	0	19820	7560	1960		1260	1900	4000	2240	1900	1900	2660	560	1150	27090	38020	37160	44460	45180	45260	49610	46910
22	▼8	(Wales) Matthew Stevens	0	26580	2400	4480		980	400	3040	2240	1400	1400	1960	560	1150	20010	58200	54560	56400	55040	52620	52260	46590
23	Steady	(Wales) Dominic Dale	0	23785	3120	1260	2500	805	900	640	640	1900	1400	2660	1960	5000	22785	46095	44940	45760	42360	43125	44370	46570
24	▲13	(China) Xiao Guodong	0	17590	3320	2660	1400	5600	400	2240	2240	2500	1400	1260	1960	2800	27780	37680	41145	43705	43385	43865	43670	45370
25	▲4	(England) Mark King	0	22865	3360	2660	575	2660	400	1440	1440	1400	1400	1960	3500	1150	21945	44325	42505	42865	43585	44050	43270	44810
26	▲8	(Wales) Michael White	0	22630	3000	1260	1400	805	2500	1440	1440	900	900	1960	1960	2800	20365	39315	38740	40280	40040	38870	40145	42995
27	▲22	(Scotland) Alan McManus	0	17550	5360	1960	325	455	900	2240	1440	1900	900	3500	560	5000	24540	32945	31860	33800	34120	34200	39040	42090
28	▼1	(Republic of Ireland) Ken Doherty	0	24485	2080	1260	1400	805	900	640	640	900	900	1960	1260	3800	16545	41790	40670	41450	39850	38790	40380	41030
29	▲13	(England) Mark Joyce	0	22355	2520	560	575	1960	1400	2240	640	900	400	3500	1260	1800	17755	31605	32895	36335	35535	35750	38155	40110
30	▲6	(Republic of Ireland) Fergal O'Brien	0	17770	5940	1260	1900	805	1400	3040	2240	900	900	560	1960	1150	22055	38200	34425	37745	39065	38670	39825	39825
31	▲33	(Norway) Kurt Maflin	0	18690	4280	1260	325	1260	400	3040	1440	1900	900	2660	1260	1800	20525	21555	23735	27175	30135	32035	36155	39215
32	▲1	(England) Ben Woollaston	0	20350	6940	2660	1400	805	400	1440	640	900	1400	560	560	1150	18855	41620	39315	40955	39715	39715	41755	39205
33	▼8	(England) Martin Gould	0	21335	3240	1960	700	2660	400	2240	640	400	900	1260	560	2800	17760	45375	45775	46335	42295	39115	38115	39095
34	▼10	(England) Tom Ford	0	21975	3960	560	2500	805	1400	640	640	900	900	1260	560	2800	16925	45235	44990	45190	42830	40330	38650	38900
35	▲6	(England) David Gilbert	0	16960	6340	2660	575	1960	900	2240	640	900	900	1260	560	2800	21735	34470	37270	39130	38890	38345	40045	38695
36	▼6	(England) Peter Ebdon	0	22850	560	1260	575	805	900	4000	1440	900	400	560	2660	1150	15210	41270	41095	44715	45795	45295	44050	38060
37	▼15	(England) Andrew Higginson	0	21115	1440	1960	700	1960	1400	640	1440	900	1400	1960	560	2300	16660	45315	43995	42355	42675	40615	39520	37775
38	▲21	(England) Rod Lawler	0	21535	3320	560	325	455	1400	2240	1440	3200	400	1260	560	650	15810	23140	24715	28715	30515	33715	36135	37345
39	▼20	(England) Ronnie O'Sullivan	0	10000	7500	0				2240	4000	400	5000			8000	27140	45640	42900	42780	44300	39700	42640	37140
40	▼12	(Scotland) Marcus Campbell	0	24395	2760	560	1400	805	900	640	2240	900	400	560	560	650	12375	42025	40465	42005	42005	40185	38670	36770
41	▼6	(England) Jack Lisowski	0	21350	3960	1960		1260	400	1440	640	1400	1400	560	1260	650	14930	38005	36585	35785	35625	36140	36880	36280
42	▲6	(Scotland) Anthony McGill	0	16790	3920	560	900	455	2500	1440	2240	1400	1400	1260	1260	1800	19135	32235	30350	34490	34730	34620	35120	35925
43	▼4	(Scotland) Jamie Burnett	0	19415	1120	1260	575	1260	900	1440	2240	1900	900	1260	560	2800	16215	34890	33420	34400	35360	35800	35200	35630
44	▲9	(England) Alfie Burden	0	18180	3400	1260	1900	1260	400	1440	640	400	900	1260	1960	1800	16620	31295	31940	33420	34100	33600	34250	34800
45	▼2	(England) Anthony Hamilton	0	15210	5860	3500		1260	900	640	640	1900	1400	1260	1260	650	19270	35810	34530	35150	34710	34180	36480	34480
46	▲21	(Thailand) Dechawat Poomjaeng	0	16990	2480	1960	1400	455	1400	640	1440	1400	900	560	1960	2300	16895	21110	22285	24325	25765	27165	29625	33885
47	▲19	(China) Cao Yupeng	0	17305	2520	3500	325	1960	400	1440	640	900	900	1260	560	1800	16205	22130	24090	27450	28090	28990	31150	33510
48	▼1	(China) Yu Delu	0	15115	5420	1260	900	1960	900	640	1440	400	400	1260	2660	650	17890	31815	31225	32365	33685	31425	33605	33005
49	▼4	(England) Rory McLeod	0	17030	2560	1260	1900	1610	400	1440	1440	400	900	1960	1260	650	15780	32520	32700	33780	32780	31920	33760	32810
50	▲20	(China) Tian Pengfei	0	15660	3760	1260	900	1260	400	1440	1440	1900	900	1260	1960	650	17130	18820	20440	23200	25000	26900	30180	32790
51	▲1	(England) Jimmy Robertson	0	15850	5600	1960	325	455	400	640	1440	900	900	560	1260	2300	16740	31400	31840	30680	30120	29760	30135	32590
52	▼14	(England) Jamie Cope	0	18425	2200	1260	1900	455	900	640	640	400	900	560	1260	2800	13915	37165	33840	35380	33900	32605	31390	32340
53	▼13	(Wales) Jamie Jones	0	12840	6400	1260	575	1260	900	1440	640	400	900	1260	1260	2300	18595	34375	34565	35145	35585	34275	34835	31435
54	▼8	(England) Nigel Bond	0	16270	3320	1260	1150	455	900	640	1440	400	400	1260	1960	1800	14985	32825	30600	30660	30060	29215	29025	31255
55	▼11	(England) Matthew Selt	0	15920	4200	560	575	455	400	1440	640	400	900	1260	1960	2300	15090	30720	28405	29845	28245	27600	28280	31010
56	▲17	(India) Aditya Mehta	0	13360	3400	560	900	910	4000	1440	640	900	400	1260	1260	1800	17470	15180	17210	23210	24850	25750	27770	30830
57	▲12	(Thailand) Thepchaiya Un-Nooh	0	15715	1280	560	325	910	400	2240	640	900	900	2660	1960	1800	14575	16600	17870	21070	22070	22970	26530	30290
58	▲16	(India) Pankaj Advani	0	13230	3160	560	900	1260	2500	1440	640	400	400	1960	1260	1800	16280	15250	17630	22130	23690	24090	26450	29510
59	▼9	(England) Dave Harold	0	17730	1120			1260	400	2240	1440	900	900	560	1960	650	11430	28835	28345	29265	29545	29760	28460	29160
60	▼3	(England) Peter Lines	0	9625	2920	2660	900	2660	400	2240	1440	1400	900	560	1260	1800	19140	25655	27255	29695	28335	28225	29265	28765
61	▲18	(England) Robbie Williams	0	11460	3800	560	1150	1610	3200	640	1440	400	400	560	560	2800	17120	13890	16220	21340	23500	23900	25220	28580
62	▲6	(England) Ian Burns	0	15960	3200	560	1400	910	400	640	640	400	900	560	560	1800	11970	18480	20110	21150	23150	23550	25570	27930
63	▲9	(Belgium) Luca Brecel	0	13500	2840	560	1150	910	400	640	1440	900	400	560	2660	1800	14260	15770	17600	19640	21440	22340	23300	27760
64	▼10	(China) Liu Chuang	0	15285	3120	560	900	1260	900	640	1440	900	900	560	560	650	12390	28920	28560	30100	31020	30770	30875	27675
65	▲15	(England) Michael Wasley	0	11420	3680	1260	900	1610	400	640	640	400	400	1260	1260	3800	16250	14660	17190	18230	19990	20390	22610	27670
66	▼11	(England) Jimmy White	0	12295	1440	1960	1150	1610	400	1440	1440	900	400	1260	2660	650	15310	27235	27025	27585	26665	25855	27155	27605
67	▲22	(Scotland) Scott Donaldson	0	7110	7000	2660	1150	910	400	640	2240	400	1900	1260	560	1300	20420	13200	14830	17190	20350	20750	25670	27530
68	▼5	(England) Mike Dunn	0	7520	3280	560	1400	1960	1900	1440	640	900	900	1260	4480	400	19120	21120	21730	25430	24790	23530	23290	26640
69	▼7	(England) Barry Pinches	0	13595	3880	560	325	455	900	640	640	400	900	1260	1260	1300	12520	20260	19105	21365	22245	21960	24660	26115
70	▼14	(Northern Ireland) Gerard Greene	0	9870	6200	1960	900	455	900	640	640	900	900	1260	560	650	15965	25990	27240	27300	25540	25755	27555	25835
71	▲10	(England) Sam Baird	0	10940	7080	560	325	1260	400	640	640	400	900	560	1260	400	14425	13345	15725	17325	19725	20125	23705	25365
72	▲3	(England) Paul Davison	0	13110	1800	560	1400	280	900	1440	1440	1400	400	560	560	1300	12040	15430	15710	18770	20570	21970	23290	25150
73	▼22	(England) Steve Davis	0	13900	2600	1260		1610	400	1440		900	400	1260	560	650	11080	29890	30510	30510	27710	26590	26280	24980
74	▲3	(China) Zhang Anda	0	11910	2800	560	1900	280	1400	1440	1440	400	400	560	560	1300	13040	14730	15010	18570	20370	20770	23090	24950
75	▼14	(Thailand) James Wattana	0	10530	1480	560	1150	1260	900	2240	1440	400	1400	560	1960	400	13750	22075	21215	23435	24355	22995	24175	24280
76	▲7	(England) Craig Steadman	0	10105	1480	1260	900	910	400	1440	640	400	900	1260	2660	1800	14050	12265	13175	15575	16575	16975	19695	24155
77	▼1	(England) Liam Highfield	0	13050	2200	1260	1150	910	900	640	640	400	400	560	560	1300	10920	16740	18010	19550	20750	21150	22110	23970
78	▼7	(Thailand) Thanawat Thirapongpaiboon	0	14140	1680	560	325	280	1400	640	640	400	400	560	560	1300	8745	15025	16065	18105	19305	19705	21025	22885
79	▼1	(China) Chen Zhe	0	11890	1640	1260	900	910	900	640	640	400	400	560	560	1300	10110	14050	15320	17780	18420	18820	20140	22000
80	▲10	(England) Joel Walker	0	5890	3040	1960	650	910	900	640	640	1400	2500	560	560	1300	15060	9060	10330	12230	14630	16030	19090	20950
81	▲1	(Malta) Tony Drago	0	10350	2760	560	1150	910	900	640	640	400	400	560	1260	400	10580	12980	14250	16150	17550	17950	19270	20930
82	▲2	(China) Li Yan	0	9360	720	560	650	910	1400	1440	640	400	400	1260	560	2300	11240	10570	11480	15040	15680	16080	17740	20600
83	New entry	(England) Gary Wilson	0	0	7400	1260	650	910	1900	1440	2240	1400	400	560	1260	400	19820	4110	5740	10440	13600	15000	18160	19820
84	▲2	(England) Martin O'Donnell	0	8340	2600	560	200	1260	400	640	640	400	400	560	1960	1300	10920	9860	11680	13080	14080	14480	16000	19260
85	▼25	(England) Adam Duffy	0	8695	720	1260	900	1610	400	1440	1440	400	400	560	560	400	10090	23195	22845	23205	23205	21985	20535	18785
86	▲1	(Wales) Daniel Wells	0	8170	2040	560	650	910	400	640	1440	900	400	560	560	1300	10360	10860	12330	13370	14810	15710	16670	18530
87	▲1	(England) David Grace	0	7905	3520	560	200	1960		640	640	400	400	560	1260	400	10540	9785	12105	13505	15065	15465	16785	18445
88	New entry	(England) Kyren Wilson	0	0	3320	560	900	3500	900	2240	640	400	400	560	1260	2800	17480	2380	6800	10700	12060	12460	13420	17480
89	▲40	(Republic of Ireland) David Morris	0	0	2800	3500	200	1610	900	640	3040	900	400	1260	1260	400	16910	4060	6990	8530	12690	13590	15250	16910
90	▲3	(England) Jamie O'Neill	0	4060	920	560	650	910	400	640	1440	900	400	560	2660	400	10440	6190	7100	8140	9580	10480	11440	14500
91	New entry	(China) Li Hang	0	0	2200	1960	650	910	400	640	2240	900	900	560	1260	1300	13920	2970	4440	6200	8440	9340	11360	13920
92	▲2	(Scotland) Michael Leslie	0	3890	1440	560	650	280	400	1440	1440	400	400	1260	560	400	9230	5820	6460	8300	10100	10500	12160	13120
93	New entry	(England) Stuart Carrington	0	0	2040	560	650		400	2240	2240	400	400	560	1260	2300	13050	2330	2690	5890	8130	8530	9490	13050
94	▼3	(England) Sean O'Sullivan	0	5590	920	560	650	910	900	640	1440		400		560	400	7380	7360	8630	10170	11610	11610	12010	12970
95	▼10	(England) Simon Bedford	0	8345	360	560	1150	1260			640						3970	10415	11675	11675	12315	12315	12315	12315
96	▼75	(England) Stephen Lee	0	12220													0	43200	38880	36120	32960	29200	18100	12220
97	New entry	(England) John Astley	0	0	2200	1260	650	910	400	640	1440	400	400	560	1260	1300	11420	2830	4660	5700	7500	7900	8860	11420
98	New entry	(Thailand) Noppon Saengkham	0	0	0	560	1400	280	900	640	2240	900	900	1960	560	400	10740	1960	2240	3780	6020	6920	9780	10740
99	▲49	(Northern Ireland) Joe Swail	0	0	3040	560	650	280	400	1440	640	400	400	560	560	1800	10730	1970	3810	6010	6650	7050	8370	10730
100	New entry	(England) Alex Davies	0	0	2440	1260	650	280	900	1440	640	400	400	1260	560	400	10630	2670	3510	6410	7050	7450	9670	10630
101	New entry	(China) Lyu Haotian	0	0	3000	1960	200	280	900	640	640	400	400	560	560	400	9940	2160	2440	5580	6220	6620	8980	9940
102	New entry	(Scotland) Ross Muir	0	0	2200	560	900	910	400	640	640	400	400	560	560	1300	9470	1460	2730	4890	5890	6290	7610	9470
103	New entry	(Wales) Andrew Pagett	0	0	2040	1260	200	910	400	640	640	400	1400	560	560	400	9410	2580	3490	4890	6090	6490	8450	9410
104	New entry	(England) Hammad Miah	0	0	1640	560	650	280	1400	640	640	400	400	560	1260	400	8830	2130	2770	5170	5810	6210	7170	8830
105	New entry	(England) Chris Wakelin	0	0	2640	560	200	280	400	640	1440	400	400	560	560	400	8480	1320	1960	3360	5800	6200	7520	8480
106	New entry	(Australia) Vinnie Calabrese	0	0	760	1260	200	280	400	640	1440	400	400	560	560	1300	8200	1460	2500	3540	4980	5380	6340	8200
107	▲24	(England) Andrew Norman	0	0	2760	560	650	280		640	640	400	400	560	560	400	7850	1770	2970	3970	5170	5570	6890	7850
108	New entry	(England) Elliot Slessor	0	0	1440	560	900	280	900	640	640	400	400	560	560	400	7680	1820	2100	4000	5000	5400	6720	7680
109	New entry	(England) Chris Norbury	0	0	760	560	200	910	400	640	1440	400	400	560	560	400	7230	760	1670	3470	4910	5310	6270	7230
110	▲9	(Finland) Robin Hull	0	0	360			280	400	1440	640	400		560		2800	6880	0	280	2120	3120	3520	4080	6880
111	▼19	(Thailand) Passakorn Suwannawat	0	5590	360			280	400								1040	5950	6230	6630	6630	6630	6630	6630
112	New entry	(England) James Cahill	0	0	560	560	200	280	400	640	640	400	400	560	560	1300	6500	760	1600	2640	3280	3680	4640	6500
113	New entry	(China) Cao Xinlong	0	0	1480			0		640	640	900	400	560	560	1300	6480	360	360	2120	2760	3660	4620	6480
114	New entry	(Malta) Alex Borg	0	0	720			280	400	640	640	400	400	560	560	1800	6400	0	280	1680	2320	2720	4040	6400
115	New entry	(England) Lee Page	0	0	720	560	650	280	400	640	640	400	400	560	560	400	6210	1570	1850	2890	3530	3930	5250	6210
116	New entry	(Thailand) Ratchayothin Yotharuck	0	0	360			280	1400	640	640	900	400	560	560	400	6140	0	280	2320	3320	4220	5180	6140
117	New entry	(England) Allan Taylor	0	0	360	560	200	910	400	640	640	400	400	560	560	400	6030	760	1670	2710	3350	3750	5070	6030
118	New entry	(Scotland) Fraser Patrick	0	0	1080	560		280	400	640	640	400	400	560	560	400	5920	920	1200	2240	3240	3640	4960	5920
119	New entry	(England) Ryan Clark	0	0	360	560	650	280	400	640	640	400	400	560	560	400	5850	1210	1490	2530	3530	3930	4890	5850
120	New entry	(Switzerland) Alexander Ursenbacher	0	0	360				400	640	640	400	400	560	560	1300	5260	0	0	1040	2040	2440	3400	5260
121	New entry	(Wales) Jak Jones	0	0	0	560	200	280	400	640	640	400	400	560	560	400	5040	760	1040	2080	2720	3120	4080	5040
122	▼26	(Egypt) Mohamed Khairy	0	1410	0	560	200	1260	400	640							3060	2170	3430	4470	4470	4470	4470	4470
123	New entry	(Qatar) Ahmed Saif	0	0	0			280	400	640	640		400		560	400	3320	0	280	1320	1960	1960	2360	3320
124	New entry	(Germany) Patrick Einsle	0	0	1080	560	200	280	400		640						3160	1480	1760	2160	2800	2800	3160	3160
125	New entry	(Libya) Khaled Belaid Abumdas	0	0								400	400	560	560	400	2320	0	0	0	0	400	1360	2320
126	New entry	(China) Jin Long	0	0	2040			0									2040	360	360	1480	1480	1480	2040	2040
127	New entry	(Brazil) Igor Figueiredo	0	0	0											1800	1800	0	0	0	0	0	0	1800
128	New entry	(China) Shi Hanqing	0	0	720												720	360	360	720	720	720	720	720
129	New entry	(England) Lee Spick	0	0	0					640	0						640	0	0	640	640	640	640	640
130	▼33	(Iran) Hossein Vafaei Ayouri	0	360	0												0	360	360	360	360	360	360	360
131	▼73	(Scotland) Stephen Hendry	0	0													0	20275	18015	17095	13935	11520	7660	0

Player did not enter tournament.
