= 2015 IBSF World Snooker Championship – Men's =

Amateur snooker tournament

IBSF World Snooker Championship
Tournament information
- Dates: 9–21 November 2015
- City: Hurghada
- Country: Egypt
- Organisation: IBSF
- Total prize fund: $16,000
- Highest break: (India) Pankaj Advani (141)

Final
- Champion: (India) Pankaj Advani
- Runner-up: (China) Zhao Xintong
- Score: 8–6

The 2015 IBSF World Snooker Championship is an amateur snooker tournament that took place from 9 November to 21 November 2015 in Hurghada, Egypt. It was the 41st edition of the IBSF World Snooker Championship and also doubled as a qualification event for the World Snooker Tour.

The event was originally due to take place in Sharm el-Sheikh, however due to the Metrojet Flight 9268 crash the tournament was relocated to Hurghada. Because of this many competitors withdrew from the competition amid safety fears, Including the entire Libyan, Russian, South Korean and Sri Lankan teams. This ended up leaving some of the groups featuring as little as four players who would subsequently all qualify for the knockout stage of the tournament regardless of their results in the group stage.

The final would go on to feature a contest between 2003 IBSF World Snooker Champion Pankaj Advani and Chinese player Zhao Xintong who had previously reached the 2013 IBSF World Snooker Championship final before losing 8–4 to fellow country man Zhou Yuelong.

Number 6 seed Advani would eventually go on to win the championship defeating Xintong 8–6 in the final. Following the tournaments result Advani was offered a two-year card on the professional World Snooker Tour for the 2016/2017 and 2017/2018 seasons. Advani had previously played on World Snooker Tour up until September 2014, when he announced that he was relinquishing his snooker tour card in order to concentrate on his billiards career and spend more time with his family.

== Results ==
=== Group Round ===
==== Group A ====
Place	Seed	Team	Matches	Matches won	Frames won	Frames lost	Difference
1	21	(Belgium) Tomasz Skalski	5	4	18	11	7
2	35	(England) Michael Rhodes	5	4	17	10	7
3	47	(Bahrain) Habib Subah	5	3	18	11	7
4	68	(Egypt) Mohamed Khairy	5	3	15	12	3
5		(United Arab Emirates) Mohammed Alshamsi	5	1	11	18	–7
6		(Egypt) Mohamed Abdelmoniem	5	0	3	20	–17

==== Group B ====
Place	Seed	Team	Matches	Matches won	Frames won	Frames lost	Difference
1	13	(Republic of Ireland) Rodney Goggins	5	5	20	7	13
2	30	(Afghanistan) Nadir Khan Sultani	5	4	19	10	9
3	50	(Australia) Ryan Thomerson	5	3	18	12	6
4	76	(Qatar) Bashar Abdulmajeed	5	2	11	16	–5
5		(Egypt) Mohamed Abdel Hakim	5	1	11	16	–5
6		(Egypt) Khaled Farouk	5	0	2	20	–18

==== Group C ====
Place	Seed	Team	Matches	Matches won	Frames won	Frames lost	Difference
1	12	(Netherlands) Raymon Fabrie	5	5	20	16	14
2	31	(Australia) Shannon Dixon	5	4	19	11	8
3	51	(Singapore) Ang Boon Chin	5	3	15	10	5
4	77	(Egypt) Mohamed Ibrahim	5	2	13	12	1
5		(Austria) Thomas Janzso	5	1	5	18	–13
6		(Palestine) Mutaz Alsalaymeh	5	0	5	20	–15

==== Group D ====
Place	Seed	Team	Matches	Matches won	Frames won	Frames lost	Difference
1	22	(India) Dharminder Lilly	5	4	18	11	7
2	32	(England) Saqib Nasir	5	4	19	12	7
3	45	(Hong Kong) Lin Tang Ho	5	3	17	11	6
4	78	(Egypt) Yaser Elsherbiny	5	3	16	17	–1
5		(Czech Republic) Lukas Krenek	5	1	10	16	–6
6		(Saudi Arabia) Abdullah Alshammari	5	0	7	20	–13

==== Group E ====
Place	Seed	Team	Matches	Matches won	Frames won	Frames lost	Difference
1	14	(Egypt) Basem Eltahhan	5	5	20	7	13
2	28	(Malta) Brian Cini	5	4	18	8	10
3	57	(Iran) Alijalil Ali	5	3	13	12	1
4	75	(Scotland) Gary Thomson	5	2	14	16	–2
5		(Saudi Arabia) Abdulraouf Saigh	5	1	13	18	–5
6		(Tunisia) Zargouni Zine El Abidine	5	0	3	20	–17

==== Group F ====
Place	Seed	Team	Matches	Matches won	Frames won	Frames lost	Difference
1	17	(Scotland) Michael Collumb	4	4	16	7	9
2	43	(Republic of Ireland) David Cassidy	4	2	13	10	3
3	58	(Egypt) Karim Elabd	4	2	12	10	2
4	72	(Japan) Keishin Kamihashi	4	2	9	10	–1
5		(Yemen) Haitham Al Hammadi	4	0	3	16	–13

==== Group G ====
Place	Seed	Team	Matches	Matches won	Frames won	Frames lost	Difference
1	18	(Syria) Karam Fatima	5	5	20	9	11
2	41	(South Africa) Richard Halliday	5	3	17	12	5
3	61	(Egypt) Mohamed Youssef	5	3	15	16	–1
4	71	(United States) Ahmed Aly Elsayed	5	2	15	15	0
5		(Syria) Haitham Shikh Khalil	5	1	10	17	–7
6		(Czech Republic) Daniel Mily	5	1	10	18	–8

==== Group H ====
Place	Seed	Team	Matches	Matches won	Frames won	Frames lost	Difference
1	11	(Saudi Arabia) Ahmed Aseeri	5	5	20	6	14
2	44	(Australia) James Mifsud	5	3	17	13	4
3	65	(Finland) Antti Mannila	5	3	15	12	3
4	83	(Egypt) Abdelrahman Abdelhamid	5	2	14	12	2
5		(Syria) Yazan Alhadad	5	2	9	13	–4
6		(Tunisia) Harzallah Oussema	5	0	1	10	–19

==== Group J ====
Place	Seed	Team	Matches	Matches won	Frames won	Frames lost	Difference
1	2	(Pakistan) Abdul Sattar	3	3	12	1	11
2	36	(Bahrain) Ahmed Janahi	3	2	9	7	2
3	64	(Egypt) Mostafa Dorgham	3	1	6	9	–3
4	81	(Austria) Jérôme Liedtke	3	0	2	12	–10

==== Group K ====
Place	Seed	Team	Matches	Matches won	Frames won	Frames lost	Difference
1	4	(China) Zhao Xintong	4	4	16	2	14
2	38	(Afghanistan) Mohammad Rais Senzahi	4	3	13	8	5
3	63	(Germany) Lukas Kleckers	4	2	9	9	0
4	85	(Singapore) Lim Chun Kiat	4	1	6	13	–7
5		(Egypt) Abdelrahman Shahin	4	0	4	16	–12

==== Group L ====
Place	Seed	Team	Matches	Matches won	Frames won	Frames lost	Difference
1	6	(India) Pankaj Advani	5	5	20	4	16
2	24	(Qatar) Mohsen Bukshaisha	5	4	17	7	10
3	60	(Isle of Man) John Kennish	5	3	13	12	1
4	73	(Egypt) Hesham Shawky	5	2	15	16	–1
5		(Singapore) Chee Keong Chan	5	1	8	16	–8
6		(Cyprus) Stayros Xatzihtooulou	5	0	2	20	–18

==== Group M ====
Place	Seed	Team	Matches	Matches won	Frames won	Frames lost	Difference
1	15	(Malaysia) Keen Hoo Moh	4	4	16	6	10
2	25	(Wales) Rhydian Richards	4	3	14	6	8
3	65	(Egypt) Khaled Farag	4	2	9	11	–2
4	87	(Saudi Arabia) Omar Alajlani	4	1	7	15	–8
5		(Brazil) Victor Sarkis	4	0	8	16	–8

==== Group N ====
Place	Seed	Team	Matches	Matches won	Frames won	Frames lost	Difference
1	8	(Pakistan) Muhammad Sajjad	5	5	20	4	16
2	23	(Thailand) Issara Kachaiwong	5	4	18	5	13
3	59	(Egypt) Tymour Hussien	5	3	14	12	2
4	82	(Egypt) Alaa Elsaed	5	1	8	17	–9
5		(Canada) Derek Martin	5	1	9	19	–10
6		(Yemen) Ahmed Haitham	5	1	7	19	–12

==== Group P ====
Place	Seed	Team	Matches	Matches won	Frames won	Frames lost	Difference
1	1	(Thailand) Kritsanut Lertsattayathorn	4	4	16	1	15
2	39	(Malaysia) Kok Leong Lim	4	3	12	9	3
3	67	(Egypt) Tamer Waheed	4	1	10	13	–3
4	74	(Egypt) Mostafa Gebely	4	1	10	15	–5
5		(Bahrain) Talal Ali	4	1	10	15	–10

==== Group Q ====
Place	Seed	Team	Matches	Matches won	Frames won	Frames lost	Difference
1	5	(China) Yuan Sijun	5	5	20	3	17
2	27	(Iran) Amir Sarkhosh	5	4	19	9	10
3	55	(Republic of Ireland) Greg Casey	5	3	14	9	5
4	84	(Palestine) Khaled Alastal	5	2	11	13	–2
5		(Egypt) Ibrahem Mahmoud	5	1	6	16	–10
6		(Cyprus) Epaminondas Pouris	5	0	0	20	–20

==== Group R ====
Place	Seed	Team	Matches	Matches won	Frames won	Frames lost	Difference
1	19	(Malta) Alex Borg	5	4	18	11	7
2	29	(Qatar) Ali Alobaidli	5	4	19	10	9
3	48	(United Arab Emirates) Khalid Kamali	5	3	16	11	5
4	70	(Belgium) Peter Bullen	5	3	13	12	1
5		(Egypt) Mohamed Hammouda	5	1	9	17	–8
6		(Morocco) Akdi Soulaimane	5	0	2	20	–18

==== Group S ====
Place	Seed	Team	Matches	Matches won	Frames won	Frames lost	Difference
1	10	(Japan) Tetsuya Kuwata	5	5	20	5	15
2	40	(Wales) Ben Jones	5	3	17	11	6
3	52	(Australia) Adrian Ridley	5	3	14	11	3
4	79	(Egypt) Ahmed Samir	5	2	11	15	–4
5		(Egypt) Ahmed Galal	5	2	10	17	–7
6		(Iran) Reza Rezvani	5	0	7	20	–13

==== Group T ====
Place	Seed	Team	Matches	Matches won	Frames won	Frames lost	Difference
1	9	(Hong Kong) Lee Chun Wai	5	5	20	4	16
2	42	(Pakistan) Shahram Changezi	5	3	16	10	6
3	62	(England) Ryan Causton	5	3	13	13	0
4	80	(Egypt) Mohamed Hemdan	5	2	11	12	–1
5		(Brazil) Thadeu Giannattasio Nobres	5	2	11	14	–3
6		(Yemen) Ahmed Saloomi	5	0	2	20	–18

==== Group U ====
Place	Seed	Team	Matches	Matches won	Frames won	Frames lost	Difference
1	3	(Iran) Soheil Vahedi	5	5	20	2	18
2	37	(India) Varun Madan	5	4	15	16	1
3	49	(Wales) Alex Taubman	5	3	16	12	4
4	86	(Finland) Antti Tolvanen	5	1	12	18	–6
5		(Mauritius) Cader Mohamed	5	1	9	16	–7
6		(Hong Kong) Nansen Sin Man Wan	5	1	9	19	–10

==== Group V ====
Place	Seed	Team	Matches	Matches won	Frames won	Frames lost	Difference
1	16	(Pakistan) Muhammad Asif	5	5	20	8	12
2	26	(India) Faisal Khan	5	4	19	9	10
3	46	(Malta) Aaron Busuttil	5	3	17	11	6
4	88	(South Africa) Abdul Mutalieb Allie	5	2	11	13	–2
5		(Iraq) Omar Ali	5	1	7	17	–10
6		(Tunisia) Moneam Neffati	5	0	4	20	–16

==== Group W ====
Place	Seed	Team	Matches	Matches won	Frames won	Frames lost	Difference
1	7	(United Arab Emirates) Mohamed Shehab	5	5	20	4	16
2	33	(Wales) Jamie Clarke	5	4	17	11	6
3	53	(Iran) Saeed Abooyesani	5	3	13	11	2
4	66	(Hong Kong) Chau Hon Man	5	2	12	12	0
5		(South Africa) Muhammad Faaris Kahn	5	1	10	16	–6
6		(Morocco) Elaziz Oussama	5	0	2	20	–18

==== Group X ====
Place	Seed	Team	Matches	Matches won	Frames won	Frames lost	Difference
1	20	(Qatar) Ahmed Saif	5	4	18	8	10
2	34	(Malaysia) Mohd Reza Hassan	5	4	18	11	7
3	54	(Austria) Dominik Scherübl	5	3	16	11	5
4	69	(Iraq) Ali Hussein	5	3	15	13	2
5		(Tunisia) Moez Chaouachi	5	1	11	19	–8
6		(Cyprus) Marios Kleitou	5	0	4	20	–16

=== Knockout rounds ===
==== Round 1 ====
Best of 7 frames

65	(Egypt) Khaled Farag	4–1	64	(Egypt) Mostafa Dorgham
81	(Austria) Jérôme Liedtke	2–4	48	(United Arab Emirates) Khalid Kamali
49	(Wales) Alex Taubman	4–2	80	(Egypt) Mohamed Hemdan
73	(Egypt) Hesham Shawky	2–4	56	(Finland) Antti Mannila
41	(South Africa) Richard Halliday	4–2	88	(South Africa) Abdul Mutalieb Allie
57	(Egypt) Alijalil Ali	4–1	72	(Japan) Keishin Kamihashi
69	(Iraq) Ali Hussein	3–4	60	(Isle of Man) John Kennish
85	(Singapore) Lim Chun Kiat	4–1	44	(Australia) James Mifsud
53	(Iran) Saeed Abooyesani	1–4	76	(Qatar) Bashar Abdulmajeed
77	(Egypt) Mohamed Ibrahim	1–4	52	(Australia) Adrian Ridley
45	(Hong Kong) Lin Tang Ho	4–1	84	(Palestine) Khaled Alastal
61	(Egypt) Mohamed Youssef	1–4	68	(Egypt) Mohamed Khairy

67	(Egypt) Tamer Waheed	0–4	62	(England) Ryan Causton
83	(Egypt) Abdelrahman Abdelhamid	1–4	46	(Malta) Aaron Busuttil
51	(Singapore) Ang Boon Chin	2–4	76	(Egypt) Yaser Elsherbiny
75	(Scotland) Gary Thomson	4–3	54	(Austria) Dominik Scherübl
43	(Republic of Ireland) David Cassidy	3–4	86	(Finland) Antti Tolvanen
59	(Egypt) Tymour Hussien	1–4	70	(Belgium) Peter Bullen
71	(United States) Ahmed Aly Elsayed	3–4	58	(Egypt) Karim Elabd
87	(Saudi Arabia) Omar Alajlani	4–2	42	(Pakistan) Shahram Changezi
55	(Republic of Ireland) Greg Casey	4–2	74	(Egypt) Mostafa Gebely
79	(Egypt) Ahmed Samir	0–4	50	(Austria) Ryan Thomerson
47	(Bahrain) Habib Subah	4–1	82	(Egypt) Alaa Elsaed
63	(Germany) Lukas Kleckers	4–1	66	(Hong Kong) Chau Hon Man

==== Round 2 ====
Best of 7 frames

1	(Thailand) Kritsanut Lertsattayathorn	4–0	65	(Egypt) Khaled Farag
33	(Wales) Jamie Clarke	4–1	32	(England) Saqib Nasir
17	(Scotland) Michael Collumb	4–1	48	(United Arab Emirates) Khalid Kamali
49	(Wales) Alex Taubman	1–4	16	(Pakistan) Muhammad Asif
9	(Hong Kong) Lee Chun Wai	4–1	56	(Finland) Antti Mannila
41	(South Africa) Richard Halliday	0–4	24	(Qatar) Mohsen Bukshaisha
25	(Wales) Rhydian Richards	1–4	40	(Wales) Ben Jones
57	(Iraq) Alijalil Ali	4–0	8	(Pakistan) Muhammad Sajjad
5	(China) Yuan Sijun	4–0	60	(Isle of Man) John Kennish
37	(India) Varun Madan	3–4	28	(Malta) Brian Cini
21	(Belgium) Tomasz Skalski	4–3	44	(Singapore) Lim Chun Kiat
76	(Qatar) Bashar Abdulmajeed	4–1	12	(Netherlands) Raymon Fabrie
13	(Republic of Ireland) Rodney Goggins	4–2	52	(Australia) Adrian Ridley
45	(Hong Kong) Lin Tang Ho	4–3	20	(Qatar) Ahmed Saif
29	(Qatar) Ali Alobaidli	3–4	36	(Bahrain) Belan Sharif
68	(Egypt) Mohamed Khairy	0–4	4	(China) Zhao Xintong

3	(Iran) Soheil Vahedi	4–1	62	(England) Ryan Causton
35	(England) Michael Rhodes	4–2	30	(Afghanistan) Nadir Khan Sultani
19	(Malta) Alex Borg	4–2	46	(Malta) Aaron Busuttil
78	(Egypt) Yaser Elsherbiny	4–2	14	(Egypt) Basem Eltahhan
11	(Saudi Arabia) Ahmed Aseeri	3–4	75	(Scotland) Gary Thomson
86	(Finland) Antti Tolvanen	1–4	22	(India) Dharminder Lilly
27	(Iran) Amir Sarkhosh	4–2	38	(Afghanistan) Mohammad Rais Senzahi
70	(Belgium) Peter Bullen	0–4	6	(India) Pankaj Advani
7	(United Arab Emirates) Mohamed Shehab	4–1	58	(Egypt) Karim Elabd
39	(Malaysia) Kok Leong Lim	3–4	26	(India) Faisal Khan
23	(Thailand) Issara Kachaiwong	4–0	87	(Saudi Arabia) Omar Alajlani
55	(Republic of Ireland) Greg Casey	4–1	10	(Japan) Tetsuya Kuwata
15	(Malaysia) Keen Hoo Moh	4–2	50	(Australia) Ryan Thomerson
47	(Bahrain) Habib Subah	1–4	18	(Egypt) Karam Fatima
31	(Australia) Shannon Dixon	3–4	34	(Malaysia) Mohd Reza Hassan
63	(Germany) Lukas Kleckers	4–0	2	(Pakistan) Abdul Sattar

==== Finals ====
Round 3 Best of 9 frames
1	(Thailand) Kritsanut Lertsattayathorn	5
33	(Wales) Jamie Clarke	1
17	(Scotland) Michael Collumb	3
16	(Pakistan) Muhammad Asif	5
9	(Hong Kong) Lee Chun Wai	0
24	(Qatar) Mohsen Bukshaisha	5
40	(Wales) Ben Jones	5
57	(Iraq) Alijalil Ali	1
5	(China) Yuan Sijun	3
28	(Malta) Brian Cini	5
21	(Belgium) Tomasz Skalski	5
76	(Qatar) Bashar Abdulmajeed	2
13	(Republic of Ireland) Rodney Goggins	4
45	(Hong Kong) Lin Tang Ho	5
36	(Bahrain) Belan Sharif	2
4	(China) Zhao Xintong	5
3	(Iran) Soheil Vahedi	5
35	(England) Michael Rhodes	4
19	(Malta) Alex Borg	5
78	(Egypt) Yaser Elsherbiny	2
75	(Scotland) Gary Thomson	5
22	(India) Dharminder Lilly	4
27	(Iran) Amir Sarkhosh	2
6	(India) Pankaj Advani	5
7	(United Arab Emirates) Mohamed Shehab	5
26	(India) Faisal Khan	3
23	(Thailand) Issara Kachaiwong	3
55	(Republic of Ireland) Greg Casey	5
15	(Malaysia) Keen Hoo Moh	4
18	(Egypt) Karam Fatima	5
34	(Malaysia) Mohd Reza Hassan	2
63	(Germany) Lukas Kleckers	5

Round 4 Best of 9 frames
1	(Thailand) Kritsanut Lertsattayathorn	5
16	(Pakistan) Muhammad Asif	4
24	(Qatar) Mohsen Bukshaisha	1
40	(Wales) Ben Jones	5
28	(Malta) Brian Cini	5
21	(Belgium) Tomasz Skalski	2
45	(Hong Kong) Lin Tang Ho	0
4	(China) Zhao Xintong	5
3	(Iran) Soheil Vahedi	4
19	(Malta) Alex Borg	5
75	(Scotland) Gary Thomson	1
6	(India) Pankaj Advani	5
7	(United Arab Emirates) Mohamed Shehab	2
55	(Republic of Ireland) Greg Casey	5
18	(Egypt) Karam Fatima	1
63	(Germany) Lukas Kleckers	5

Quarter-Finals; Best of 11 frames
1	(Thailand) Kritsanut Lertsattayathorn	4
40	(Wales) Ben Jones	6
28	(Malta) Brian Cini	2
4	(China) Zhao Xintong	6
19	(Malta) Alex Borg	0
6	(India) Pankaj Advani	6
55	(Republic of Ireland) Greg Casey	4
63	(Germany) Lukas Kleckers	6

Semi-Finals; Best of 13 frames
40	(Wales) Ben Jones	1
4	(China) Zhao Xintong	7
6	(India) Pankaj Advani	7
63	(Germany) Lukas Kleckers	5

Final; Best of 15 frames
4	(China) Zhao Xintong	6
6	(India) Pankaj Advani	8

== Century breaks ==
- 141, 109, 108, 106, 105 – Pankaj Advani
- 136, 108 – Brian Cini
- 130, 102 – Issara Kachaiwong
- 127 – Basem Eltahhan
- 126, 119, 116, 108, 105 – Zhao Xintong
- 126 – Saqib Nasir
- 122 – Mohd Reza Hassan
- 122 – Shahram Changezi
- 122 – Alex Borg
- 120 – Alex Taubman
- 119 – Muhammad Sajjad
- 115 – Ryan Thomerson
- 110 – Amir Sarkhosh
- 109, 108 – Soheil Vahedi
- 109 – Faisal Khan
- 107 – Ben Jones
- 103, 102 – Lee Chun Wai
- 102 – Aaron Busuttil
- 102 – Michael Collumb
- 101 – Karam Fatima
