= 2016 ACBS Asian Snooker Championship =

ACBS Asian Snooker Championship
Tournament information
- Dates: 16–23 April 2016
- City: Doha
- Country: Qatar
- Organisation: ACBS
- Highest break: (Thailand) Kritsanut Lertsattayathorn (142)

Final
- Champion: (Thailand) Kritsanut Lertsattayathorn
- Runner-up: (United Arab Emirates) Mohamed Shehab
- Score: 6–2

The 2016 ACBS Asian Snooker Championship was an amateur snooker tournament that is taking place from 16 April to 23 April 2016 in Doha, Qatar. It is the 32nd edition of the ACBS Asian Snooker Championship and also doubles as a qualification event for the World Snooker Tour.

The tournament was won by the number 13 seed Kritsanut Lertsattayathorn of Thailand who defeated Mohamed Shehab 6–2 in the final to win the championship, as a result Lertsattayathorn was given a two-year card on the professional World Snooker Tour for the 2016/2017 and 2017/2018 seasons.

== Results ==
=== Round 1 ===
Best of 7 frames

33	(Iraq) Alijalil Ali	4–1	32	(Singapore) Chee Keong Chan
29	(Philippines) Jefrey Roda	4–1	36	(Singapore) Robby Suarly

35	(Singapore) Lim Chun Kiat	1–4	30	(Pakistan) Sohail Shehzad
31	(Qatar) A.Mohsin Al-Abdulrahman	3–4	34	(Philippines) Alvin Barbero

Round 2 Best of 7 frames
1	(India) P. Advani	4
33	(Iraq) A. Ali	1
17	(United Arab Emirates) M.A. Joaker	1
16	(India) I.S. Chadha	4
9	(Thailand) Y. Pakpoj	4
24	(United Arab Emirates) M. Alshamsi	0
25	(Syria) K. Fatima	4
8	(India) M. Chandra	3
5	(Pakistan) M. Sajjad	3
28	(Iran) S. Vahedi	4
21	(Pakistan) M. Asif	4
12	(India) S. Gulati	2
13	(Thailand) K. Lertsattayathorn	4
20	(Hong Kong) F.K. Wai	3
29	(Philippines) J. Roda	1
4	(Pakistan) M. Bilal	4
3	(Bahrain) H. Sabah	4
30	(Pakistan) S. Shehzad	3
19	(Qatar) A. Alobaidli	3
14	(United Arab Emirates) M. Shehab	4
11	(Malaysia) K.H. Moh	4
22	(Iraq) A. Hussein	1
27	(Hong Kong) C.C. Au	0
6	(Saudi Arabia) O. Alajlani	4
7	(Hong Kong) C.W. Au	4
26	(Bahrain) H. Mahmood	1
23	(Saudi Arabia) A. Aseeri	1
10	(Philippines) M. Mengorio	4
15	(Qatar) A. Saif	3
18	(Iran) A. Sarkhosh	4
34	(Philippines) A. Barbero	3
2	(Iran) A. Dinarvand	4

Round 3 Best of 7 frames
1	(India) P. Advani	4
16	(India) I.S. Chadha	3
9	(Thailand) Y. Pakpoj	2
25	(Syria) K. Fatima	4
28	(Iran) S. Vahedi	2
21	(Pakistan) M. Asif	4
13	(Thailand) K. Lertsattayathorn	4
4	(Pakistan) M. Bilal	1
3	(Bahrain) H. Sabah	1
14	(United Arab Emirates) M. Shehab	4
11	(Malaysia) K.H. Moh	3
6	(Saudi Arabia) O. Alajlani	4
7	(Hong Kong) C.W. Au	3
10	(Philippines) M. Mengorio	4
18	(Iran) A. Sarkhosh	4
2	(Iran) A. Dinarvand	0

Quarter-Finals; Best of 9 frames
1	(India) P. Advani	5
25	(Syria) K. Fatima	0
21	(Pakistan) M. Asif	4
13	(Thailand) K. Lertsattayathorn	5
14	(United Arab Emirates) M. Shehab	5
6	(Saudi Arabia) O. Alajlani	1
10	(Philippines) M. Mengorio	3
18	(Iran) A. Sarkhosh	5

Semi-Finals; Best of 9 frames
1	(India) P. Advani	3
13	(Thailand) K. Lertsattayathorn	5
14	(United Arab Emirates) M. Shehab	5
18	(Iran) A. Sarkhosh	1

Final; Best of 11 frames
13	(Thailand) K. Lertsattayathorn	6
14	(United Arab Emirates) M. Shehab	2
