= Michael Wild =

English snooker player

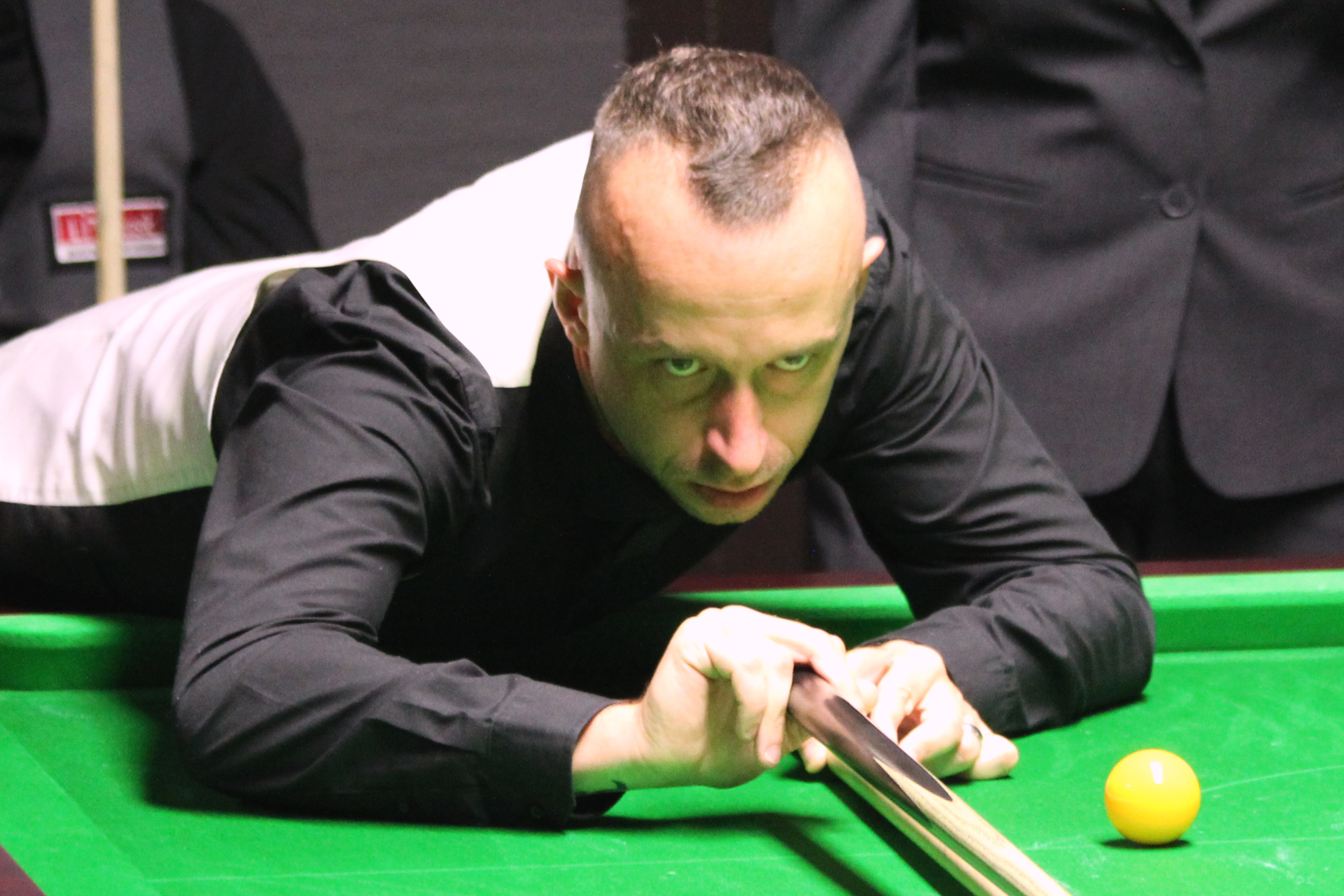
- Wild at the 2016 Paul Hunter Classic

Personal information
- Born: 27 March 1981 (age 45)

Sport
- Country: England
- Sport: Snooker
- Professional: 2003/2004, 2015–2017
- Highest ranking: 85 (June 2016)
- Best ranking finish: Last 32 (x2)

Michael Wild (born 27 March 1981) is an English former professional snooker player.

== Career ==
During the late 1990s and early 2000s, Wild competed in the Challenge Tour and International Open Series events, without much success until the 2002/2003 season, when he reached the last 16 at Challenge Tour events 1 and 2; these performances were sufficient for him to earn a place on the sport's main tour, which he took up in 2003.

Wild's first season as a professional brought little success itself, his best finish a run to the last 80 in the British Open, where he beat Kristján Helgason and Munraj Pal, before losing to Mike Dunn. He won only £3,850 prize money during the season and, finishing it ranked 121st, fell off the tour.

Several years of attempting to qualify again for the main tour through the International Open Series followed; during the 2005/2006 season, he reached the semi-finals in Event 1 - losing 1–5 to Martin Gould - and the quarter-finals in Event 3, where Liu Song beat him 5–2. Another semi-final came in 2007, before Wild recorded his first run to the final of a tournament, in Event 4 of that year's series. There his opponents included Robert Stephen and David Grace, but in the final, he lost 3–6 to Matthew Couch.

With the advent of the Players Tour Championship in the 2010–11 season, Wild found form after another lean period, recording two last-64 finishes - in Event 2 and EPTC1, where he lost 2–4 to Dave Harold and 1–4 to Ricky Walden respectively. He entered Q-School in 2011 and reached the quarter-finals of the second event, but, leading David Morris 3–1 and requiring only one more win to return to the tour, eventually lost 3–4.

Having fared better in Q-School the following year, Wild was invited to play in several ranking events in 2012–13 season as a top-up amateur, and competed in his first such event in eight years at the 2012 Wuxi Classic qualifying stage. He was drawn to play Craig Steadman and led 2–0, but could not prevent a 3–5 defeat. In the 2012 Australian Goldfields Open, he came within one win of reaching the televised stages in Bendigo, beating Daniel Wells 5–0, Simon Bedford 5–2 and six-time World Champion Steve Davis 5–0, but lost in the final round 0–5 to Ken Doherty.

Wild enjoyed further success at the 2012 Paul Hunter Classic, where he defeated Jordan Brown, Marcus Campbell and Scott Donaldson before being eliminated in the last 16, losing 3–4 to Doherty. The two would meet in another two matches during the season, both of these also resulting in 4–3 victories for Doherty - in the 2012 Scottish Open and the Munich Open.

In 2015, Wild won the EBSA European Snooker Championship, beating Jamie Clarke 7–4 in the final, to win back his place on the main tour after twelve years away.

In his first season back on the tour, Wild produced the finest performance of his career in whitewashing former world number one Judd Trump 6–0 in the 2015 International Championship qualifying round, but lost all seven of his matches thereafter - 0–6 to Sanderson Lam in the next qualifying round, by the same scoreline to Dominic Dale in the UK Championship, 3–5 to Anthony McGill in the German Masters, 3–4 to Jimmy Robertson in the Welsh Open, 2–4 to Mark King in the Gdynia Open, 2–5 to Tom Ford in the China Open and 6–10 - having trailed 0–9 - to Michael Holt in the World Championship. As a result, he ended the season ranked 110th.

He recorded his first victory of the 2016–17 season in the 2016 European Masters, defeating Cao Yupeng 4–3 from 1–3 behind, and followed this with a similar deciding-frame win over Jamie Jones from 0–3 behind, to reach the televised stages of a ranking tournament for the first time in his career.

== Performance and rankings timeline ==
Tournament	1997/ 98	1998/ 99	1999/ 00	2000/ 01	2001/ 02	2002/ 03	2003/ 04	2004/ 05	2010/ 11	2011/ 12	2012/ 13	2013/ 14	2015/ 16	2016/ 17	2017/ 18	2018/ 19
Ranking (Note: From the 2010/2011 season it shows the ranking at the beginning of the season.)	(Note: He was an amateur.)						(Note: New players on the Main Tour do not have a ranking)							83		
Ranking tournaments
Riga Masters	Tournament Not Held												MR	LQ	A	A
World Open (Note: The event ran under the names Grand Prix (1997/1998–2000/2001 and 2004/2005) and LG Cup (2001/2002–2003/2004))	A	A	A	A	A	A	LQ	A	A	A	LQ	A	NH	LQ	A	A
Paul Hunter Classic	Tournament Not Held							PA	Minor-Ranking Event					1R	LQ	1R
European Masters (Note: The event also ran under the names Irish Open (1998/1999), European Open (2001/2002–2003/2004) and Malta Cup (2004/2005))	Not Held					A	LQ	A	Tournament Not Held					1R	A	A
English Open	Tournament Not Held													1R	A	A
International Championship	Tournament Not Held										A	A	1R	LQ	A	A
Northern Ireland Open	Tournament Not Held													1R	A	A
UK Championship	A	A	A	A	A	A	LQ	A	A	A	A	A	1R	1R	A	A
Scottish Open (Note: The event ran under the name Players Championship (2003/2004))	A	A	A	A	A	A	LQ	Tournament Not Held			MR	Not Held		1R	A	A
German Masters	Tournament Not Held								A	A	A	A	LQ	LQ	A	A
World Grand Prix	Tournament Not Held												DNQ	DNQ	DNQ	DNQ
Welsh Open	A	A	A	A	A	A	LQ	A	A	A	A	A	1R	1R	A	A
Shoot-Out	Tournament Not Held								Non-Ranking Event					1R	A	A
Indian Open	Tournament Not Held											A	NH	LQ	A	A
Players Championship (Note: The event ran under the name Players Tour Championship Grand Finals (2010/2011–2012/2013) and the Players Championship Grand Final (2013/2014–2015/2016))	Tournament Not Held								DNQ	DNQ	DNQ	DNQ	DNQ	DNQ	DNQ	DNQ
Gibraltar Open	Tournament Not Held												MR	1R	3R	A
Tour Championship	Tournament Not Held															DNQ
China Open (Note: The event ran under the name China International (1998/1999))	NR	A	A	A	A	Not Held		A	A	A	LQ	A	LQ	LQ	A	A
World Championship	LQ	LQ	LQ	LQ	LQ	LQ	LQ	LQ	A	A	A	A	LQ	LQ	A	A
Non-ranking tournaments
The Masters	LQ	A	A	A	LQ	LQ	LQ	A	A	A	A	A	A	A	A	A
Former ranking tournaments
British Open	A	A	A	A	A	A	LQ	Tournament Not Held								
Irish Masters	Non-Ranking Event				A	A	LQ	A	Tournament Not Held							
Wuxi Classic	Tournament Not Held								Non-Ranking		LQ	A	Tournament Not Held			
Australian Goldfields Open	Tournament Not Held									A	LQ	A	LQ	Not Held		
Shanghai Masters	Tournament Not Held								A	A	A	A	LQ	LQ	A	NH

Performance Table Legend
LQ	lost in the qualifying draw	#R	lost in the early rounds of the tournament (WR = Wildcard round, RR = Round robin)	QF	lost in the quarter-finals
SF	lost in the semi-finals	F	lost in the final	W	won the tournament
DNQ	did not qualify for the tournament	A	did not participate in the tournament	WD	withdrew from the tournament

NH / Not Held	means an event was not held.
NR / Non-Ranking Event	means an event is/was no longer a ranking event.
R / Ranking Event	means an event is/was a ranking event.
MR / Minor-Ranking Event	means an event is/was a minor-ranking event.

== Career finals ==
=== Pro-am finals: 1 (1 title) ===
Outcome	Year	Championship	Opponent in the final	Score
Winner	2006	Dutch Open	(England) Mark King	6–5

=== Amateur finals: 2 (1 title) ===
Outcome	Year	Championship	Opponent in the final	Score
Runner-up	2007	PIOS - Event 4	(England) Matthew Couch	3–6
Winner	2015	EBSA European Amateur Championship	(Wales) Jamie Clarke	7–4
