= 2015 EBSA European Snooker Championship =

EBSA European Snooker Championships
Tournament information
- Dates: 2–13 June 2015
- City: Prague
- Country: Czech Republic
- Organisation: EBSA
- Winner's share: €1,600
- Highest break: (Poland) Adam Stefanów (138)

Final
- Champion: (England) Michael Wild
- Runner-up: (Wales) Jamie Clarke
- Score: 7–4

The 2015 EBSA European Snooker Championships was an amateur snooker tournament that took place from 2 June to 13 June 2015 in Prague, Czech Republic It was the 24th edition of the EBSA European Snooker Championships and also doubles as a qualification event for the World Snooker Tour.

The tournament was won by 9th seed Michael Wild who defeated Jamie Clarke 7–4 in the final. As a result, Wild was given a two-year card on the professional World Snooker Tour for the 2015/2016 and 2016/2017 seasons.

== Results ==
=== Round 1 ===
Best of 7 frames

1	(England) Antony Parsons	4–0	64	(Portugal) Rui Santos
33	(Lithuania) Vilius Schulte	3–4	32	(Turkey) Ismail Türker
17	(Belgium) Tomasz Skalski	4–2	48	(Netherlands) Rene Dikstra
49	(Republic of Ireland) John O'Sullivan	1–4	16	(Scotland) Robert Carlisle
9	(England) Michael Wild	4–1	28	(Russia) Ivan Kakovsky
41	(Iceland) Sigurdur Kristjansson	4–3	24	(Czech Republic) Lukas Krenek
25	(Germany) Roman Dietzel	4–3	40	(Israel) Danni Bismoot
57	(Germany) Felix Frede	1–4	8	(Poland) Mateusz Baranowski
5	(Scotland) Michael Collumb	4–0	60	(Czech Republic) Tomas Kubicek
37	(Germany) Sascha Lippe	4–0	28	(Finland) Janne Hummastenniemi
21	(Germany) Lukas Kleckers	4–1	44	(Bulgaria) Bratislav Krastev
53	(Czech Republic) Daniel Kohout	0–4	12	(Poland) Adam Stefanów
13	(Malta) Aaron Busuttil	3–4	52	(Belgium) Jurian Heusdens
45	(Croatia) Gregory Kopec	3–4	20	(Denmark) Rune Kampe
29	(Serbia) Sasa Stojanovic	1–4	36	(Austria) Andreas Ploner
61	(Serbia) Marko Vukovic	0–4	4	(Iceland) Kristján Helgason

3	(Republic of Ireland) Brendan O'Donoghue	4–0	62	(Lithuania) Simonas Dragunas
35	(Poland) Marcin Nitschke	3–4	30	(Wales) Sam Thomas
19	(Wales) Jamie Clarke	4–1	46	(Denmark) Danny Eriksen
51	(Netherlands) Richard Van Leeuwen	1–4	41	(Poland) Krzysztof Wróbel
11	(Northern Ireland) Raymond Fry	4–2	54	(Scotland) Lee Mein
43	(Northern Ireland) Cormac McQuillan	0–4	22	(Malta) Brian Cini
27	(Malta) Jason Peplow	4–0	38	(Wales) Tyler Rees
59	(Latvia) Rodion Judin	2–4	6	(England) John Whitty
7	(Estonia) Andres Petrov	4–1	58	(Bulgaria) Hristo Sirakov
39	(Austria) Paul Schopf	2–4	26	(Cyprus) Antonis Poullos
23	(Israel) Maor Shalom	4–2	42	(Belgium) Jurgen Van Roy
55	(Bulgaria) Spasian Spasov	1–4	10	(Northern Ireland) Declan Lavery
15	(Republic of Ireland) Greg Casey	4–0	50	(Finland) Antti Tolvanen
47	(Croatia) Sanjin Kusan	2–4	18	(Israel) Shachar Ruberg
31	(Finland) Mika Hummelin	2–4	34	(Latvia) Maris Volajs
63	(Hungary) Soma Berghold	0–4	2	(Poland) Kacper Filipiak

Round 2 Best of 7 frames
1	(England) Antony Parsons	4
32	(Turkey) Ismail Türker	1
17	(Belgium) Tomasz Skalski	0
16	(Scotland) Robert Carlisle	4
9	(England) Michael Wild	4
41	(Iceland) Sigurdur Kristjansson	1
25	(Germany) Roman Dietzel	3
8	(Poland) Mateusz Baranowski	4
5	(Scotland) Michael Collumb	4
37	(Germany) Sascha Lippe	2
21	(Germany) Lukas Kleckers	4
12	(Poland) Adam Stefanów	2
52	(Belgium) Jurian Heusdens	2
20	(Denmark) Rune Kampe	4
36	(Austria) Andreas Ploner	2
4	(Iceland) Kristján Helgason	4
3	(Republic of Ireland) Brendan O'Donoghue	4
30	(Wales) Sam Thomas	0
19	(Wales) Jamie Clarke	4
41	(Poland) Krzysztof Wróbel	1
11	(Northern Ireland) Raymond Fry	2
22	(Malta) Brian Cini	4
27	(Malta) Jason Peplow	4
6	(England) John Whitty	2
7	(Estonia) Andres Petrov	4
26	(Cyprus) Antonis Poullos	3
23	(Israel) Maor Shalom	1
10	(Northern Ireland) Declan Lavery	4
15	(Republic of Ireland) Greg Casey	1
18	(Israel) Shachar Ruberg	4
34	(Latvia) Maris Volajs	0
2	(Poland) Kacper Filipiak	4

Round 3 Best of 9 frames
1	(England) Antony Parsons	5
16	(Scotland) Robert Carlisle	4
9	(England) Michael Wild	5
8	(Poland) Mateusz Baranowski	4
5	(Scotland) Michael Collumb	2
21	(Germany) Lukas Kleckers	5
20	(Denmark) Rune Kampe	2
4	(Iceland) Kristján Helgason	5
3	(Republic of Ireland) Brendan O'Donoghue	1
19	(Wales) Jamie Clarke	5
22	(Malta) Brian Cini	5
27	(Malta) Jason Peplow	1
7	(Estonia) Andres Petrov	5
10	(Northern Ireland) Declan Lavery	4
18	(Israel) Shachar Ruberg	3
2	(Poland) Kacper Filipiak	5

Quarter-Finals; Best of 9 frames
1	(England) Antony Parsons	3
9	(England) Michael Wild	5
21	(Germany) Lukas Kleckers	5
4	(Iceland) Kristján Helgason	3
19	(Wales) Jamie Clarke	5
22	(Malta) Brian Cini	4
7	(Estonia) Andres Petrov	5
2	(Poland) Kacper Filipiak	0

Semi-Finals; Best of 11 frames
9	(England) Michael Wild	6
21	(Germany) Lukas Kleckers	3
19	(Wales) Jamie Clarke	6
7	(Estonia) Andres Petrov	3

Final; Best of 13 frames
9	(England) Michael Wild	7
19	(Wales) Jamie Clarke	4
