= 2014 Six-red World Championship =

Six-red World Championship
Tournament information
- Dates: 1–6 September 2014
- Venue: Montien Riverside Hotel
- City: Bangkok
- Country: Thailand
- Organisation: World Professional Billiards and Snooker Association
- Total prize fund: 8,000,000 baht
- Winner's share: 2,500,000 baht
- Highest break: 75 (x5)

Final
- Champion: (Scotland) Stephen Maguire
- Runner-up: (England) Ricky Walden
- Score: 8–7

The 2014 Six-red World Championship (often styled the 2014 SangSom 6-red World Championship for sponsorship and marketing purposes) was a six-red snooker tournament held between 1 and 6 September 2014 at the Montien Riverside Hotel in Bangkok, Thailand.

Mark Selby was to take part in the tournament, but he was replaced by Andrew Pagett due to a stomach bug.

Mark Davis was the defending champion, but lost 2–6 against Kritsanut Lertsattayathorn in the last 16.

Stephen Maguire won in the final 8–7 against Ricky Walden.

== Prize money ==
The breakdown of prize money for this year is shown below:

- Winner: 2,500,000 baht
- Runner-up: 1,000,000 baht
- Semi-finalists: 500,000 baht
- Quarter-finalists: 250,000 baht
- Last 16: 125,000 baht
- Last 32: 62,500 baht
- Group stage: 31,250 baht
- Total: 8,000,000 baht

== Round-robin stage ==
The top four players from each group qualified for the knock-out stage. All matches were best of 9 frames.

=== Group A ===
POS	Player	MP	MW	FW	FL	FD	PTS
1	(Wales) Dominic Dale	5	5	25	4	+21	5
2	(Republic of Ireland) Ken Doherty	5	4	23	14	+9	4
3	(England) Mark Davis	5	3	19	14	+5	3
4	(Australia) Ben Judge	5	2	15	18	−3	2
5	(Thailand) Ratchayothin Yotharuck	5	1	11	21	−10	1
6	(Malaysia) Thor Chuan Leong	5	0	3	25	−22	0

- Ben Judge 5–2 Ratchayothin Yotharuck
- Dominic Dale 5–3 Ken Doherty
- Mark Davis 5–3 Ratchayothin Yotharuck
- Ben Judge 5–1 Thor Chuan Leong
- Mark Davis 3–5 Ken Doherty
- Thor Chuan Leong 1–5 Ratchayothin Yotharuck
- Ken Doherty 5–4 Ben Judge
- Dominic Dale 5–0 Ratchayothin Yotharuck
- Mark Davis 5–1 Ben Judge
- Dominic Dale 5–0 Thor Chuan Leong
- Mark Davis 5–0 Thor Chuan Leong
- Dominic Dale 5–0 Ben Judge
- Ken Doherty 5–1 Thor Chuan Leong
- Mark Davis 1–5 Dominic Dale
- Ken Doherty 5–1 Ratchayothin Yotharuck

=== Group B ===
POS	Player	MP	MW	FW	FL	FD	PTS
1	(Iran) Hossein Vafaei	5	4	23	14	+9	4
2	(England) Michael Holt	5	4	21	17	+4	4
3	(Thailand) Noppon Saengkham	5	3	23	18	+5	3
4	(Wales) Michael White	5	3	20	17	+3	3
5	(Wales) Andrew Pagett	5	1	17	20	−3	1
6	(Taiwan) Hung Chuang Ming	5	0	7	25	−18	0

- Hossein Vafaei 5–1 Hung Chuang Ming
- Michael White 5–4 Noppon Saengkham
- Michael Holt 5–2 Hung Chuang Ming
- Andrew Pagett 1–5 Noppon Saengkham
- Michael White 3–5 Hossein Vafaei
- Hung Chuang Ming 4–5 Noppon Saengkham
- Andrew Pagett 3–5 Michael White
- Michael Holt 5–4 Noppon Saengkham
- Andrew Pagett 4–5 Hossein Vafaei
- Michael Holt 5–2 Michael White
- Andrew Pagett 5–0 Hung Chuang Ming
- Michael Holt 1–5 Hossein Vafaei
- Michael White 5–0 Hung Chuang Ming
- Andrew Pagett 4–5 Michael Holt
- Hossein Vafaei 3–5 Noppon Saengkham

=== Group C ===
POS	Player	MP	MW	FW	FL	FD	PTS
1	(Wales) Ryan Day	5	4	22	13	+9	4
2	(Thailand) Boonyarit Keattikun	5	3	22	18	+4	3
3	(Iran) Ehsan Heidarinejad	5	2	20	21	−1	2
4	(England) Barry Hawkins	5	2	19	21	−2	2
5	(Qatar) Mohsen Bukshaisha	5	2	18	22	−4	2
6	(England) Jimmy White	5	2	15	21	−6	2

- Mohsen Bukshaisha 5–3 Ehsan Heidarinejad
- Jimmy White 5–3 Boonyarit Keattikun
- Ryan Day 5–3 Ehsan Heidarinejad
- Mohsen Bukshaisha 5–4 Boonyarit Keattikun
- Barry Hawkins 5–2 Jimmy White
- Ehsan Heidarinejad 4–5 Boonyarit Keattikun
- Ryan Day 5–1 Jimmy White
- Barry Hawkins 2–5 Boonyarit Keattikun
- Jimmy White 5–3 Mohsen Bukshaisha
- Barry Hawkins 3–5 Ryan Day
- Barry Hawkins 4–5 Ehsan Heidarinejad
- Ryan Day 5–1 Mohsen Bukshaisha
- Jimmy White 2–5 Ehsan Heidarinejad
- Barry Hawkins 5–4 Mohsen Bukshaisha
- Ryan Day 2–5 Boonyarit Keattikun

=== Group D ===
POS	Player	MP	MW	FW	FL	FD	PTS
1	(England) Shaun Murphy	5	4	23	13	+10	4
2	(Thailand) Thepchaiya Un-Nooh	5	4	23	14	+9	4
3	(Israel) Shachar Ruberg	5	3	18	18	0	3
4	(England) Robert Milkins	5	2	21	19	+2	2
5	(Iran) Amir Sarkhosh	5	2	14	18	−4	2
6	(India) Shivam Arora	5	0	8	25	−17	0

- Shivam Arora 0–5 Amir Sarkhosh
- Shaun Murphy 5–2 Shachar Ruberg
- Shivam Arora 3–5 Thepchaiya Un-Nooh
- Robert Milkins 3–5 Amir Sarkhosh
- Shaun Murphy 3–5 Thepchaiya Un-Nooh
- Amir Sarkhosh 2–5 Thepchaiya Un-Nooh
- Shachar Ruberg 5–4 Shivam Arora
- Robert Milkins 5–3 Thepchaiya Un-Nooh
- Shaun Murphy 5–0 Shivam Arora
- Robert Milkins 4–5 Shachar Ruberg
- Shaun Murphy 5–2 Amir Sarkhosh
- Robert Milkins 5–1 Shivam Arora
- Shachar Ruberg 1–5 Thepchaiya Un-Nooh
- Shaun Murphy 5–4 Robert Milkins
- Shachar Ruberg 5–0 Amir Sarkhosh

=== Group E ===
POS	Player	MP	MW	FW	FL	FD	PTS
1	(England) Ricky Walden	5	4	24	9	+15	4
2	(Wales) Matthew Stevens	5	4	21	8	+13	4
3	(India) Kamal Chawla	5	3	20	20	0	3
4	(Thailand) James Wattana	5	3	18	19	−1	3
5	(Malta) Alex Borg	5	1	14	23	−9	1
6	(Australia) Steven Donohoe	5	0	7	25	−18	0

- Steven Donohoe 2–5 Kamal Chawla
- Alex Borg 4–5 James Wattana
- Matthew Stevens 5–2 Kamal Chawla
- Steven Donohoe 2–5 James Wattana
- Ricky Walden 5–1 Alex Borg
- Alex Borg 5–3 Steven Donohoe
- Matthew Stevens 5–1 James Wattana
- Ricky Walden 4–5 Kamal Chawla
- Matthew Stevens 5–0 Alex Borg
- Ricky Walden 5–2 James Wattana
- Matthew Stevens 5–0 Steven Donohoe
- Alex Borg 4–5 Kamal Chawla
- Ricky Walden 5–0 Steven Donohoe
- Kamal Chawla 3–5 James Wattana
- Ricky Walden 5–1 Matthew Stevens

=== Group F ===
POS	Player	MP	MW	FW	FL	FD	PTS
1	(Wales) Mark Williams	5	4	24	13	+11	4
2	(Scotland) John Higgins	5	4	23	17	+6	4
3	(Wales) Jamie Clarke	5	3	22	16	+6	3
4	(Thailand) Kritsanut Lertsattayathorn	5	2	18	17	+1	2
5	(Australia) Adrian Ridley	5	2	14	18	−4	2
6	(Morocco) Chaouki Yousfi	5	0	5	25	−20	0

- Adrian Ridley 5–0 Chaouki Yousfi
- Jamie Clarke 5–3 Kritsanut Lertsattayathorn
- Mark Williams 5–0 Chaouki Yousfi
- Adrian Ridley 1–5 Kritsanut Lertsattayathorn
- John Higgins 5–4 Jamie Clarke
- John Higgins 3–5 Adrian Ridley
- Chaouki Yousfi 1–5 Kritsanut Lertsattayathorn
- Mark Williams 5–3 Jamie Clarke
- John Higgins 5–2 Kritsanut Lertsattayathorn
- Mark Williams 5–2 Adrian Ridley
- John Higgins 5–2 Chaouki Yousfi
- Mark Williams 5–3 Kritsanut Lertsattayathorn
- Jamie Clarke 5–2 Chaouki Yousfi
- John Higgins 5–4 Mark Williams
- Jamie Clarke 5–1 Adrian Ridley

=== Group G ===
POS	Player	MP	MW	FW	FL	FD	PTS
1	(England) Stuart Bingham	5	5	25	12	+13	5
2	(Scotland) Graeme Dott	5	4	22	12	+10	4
3	(Thailand) Dechawat Poomjaeng	5	3	20	15	+5	3
4	(Pakistan) Muhammad Asif	5	1	16	22	−6	1
5	(Wales) Gareth Allen	5	1	15	24	−9	1
6	(Austria) Andreas Ploner	5	1	10	23	−13	1

- Gareth Allen 5–4 Muhammad Asif
- Stuart Bingham 5–2 Graeme Dott
- Andreas Ploner 1–5 Dechawat Poomjaeng
- Graeme Dott 5–1 Muhammad Asif
- Stuart Bingham 5–1 Andreas Ploner
- Muhammad Asif 2–5 Dechawat Poomjaeng
- Andreas Ploner 5–3 Gareth Allen
- Graeme Dott 5–3 Dechawat Poomjaeng
- Stuart Bingham 5–3 Gareth Allen
- Graeme Dott 5–1 Andreas Ploner
- Stuart Bingham 5–4 Muhammad Asif
- Gareth Allen 2–5 Dechawat Poomjaeng
- Andreas Ploner 2–5 Muhammad Asif
- Graeme Dott 5–2 Gareth Allen
- Stuart Bingham 5–2 Dechawat Poomjaeng

=== Group H ===
POS	Player	MP	MW	FW	FL	FD	PTS
1	(Scotland) Stephen Maguire	5	4	23	7	+16	4
2	(China) Liang Wenbo	5	4	24	11	+13	4
3	(England) Joe Perry	5	3	19	18	+1	3
4	(Poland) Kacper Filipiak	5	2	11	17	−6	2
5	(Thailand) Thanawat Thirapongpaiboon	5	2	14	22	−8	2
6	(Egypt) Ahmed Galal	5	0	9	25	−16	0

- Kacper Filipiak 5–0 Ahmed Galal
- Liang Wenbo 5–1 Thanawat Thirapongpaiboon
- Joe Perry 5–3 Ahmed Galal
- Kacper Filipiak 5–2 Thanawat Thirapongpaiboon
- Stephen Maguire 3–5 Liang Wenbo
- Stephen Maguire 5–1 Ahmed Galal
- Liang Wenbo 5–0 Kacper Filipiak
- Joe Perry 4–5 Thanawat Thirapongpaiboon
- Stephen Maguire 5–0 Kacper Filipiak
- Joe Perry 5–4 Liang Wenbo
- Ahmed Galal 3–5 Thanawat Thirapongpaiboon
- Joe Perry 5–1 Kacper Filipiak
- Stephen Maguire 5–1 Thanawat Thirapongpaiboon
- Liang Wenbo 5–2 Ahmed Galal
- Stephen Maguire 5–0 Joe Perry

== Knockout stage ==
Last 32; Best of 11 frames
(Wales) Dominic Dale	6
(England) Robert Milkins	2
(Thailand) Dechawat Poomjaeng	6
(China) Liang Wenbo	5
(Thailand) Thepchaiya Un-Nooh	5
(Iran) Ehsan Heidarinejad	6
(Pakistan) Muhammad Asif	4
(Iran) Hossein Vafaei	6
(Wales) Mark Williams	6
(Poland) Kacper Filipiak	0
(England) Joe Perry	6
(Thailand) Boonyarit Keattikun	2
(Scotland) Graeme Dott	5
(Israel) Shachar Ruberg	6
(England) Barry Hawkins	2
(England) Ricky Walden	6
(Scotland) Stephen Maguire	6
(Australia) Ben Judge	4
(Wales) Jamie Clarke	6
(Republic of Ireland) Ken Doherty	5
(Wales) Matthew Stevens	3
(Thailand) Noppon Saengkham	6
(Wales) Michael White	4
(England) Shaun Murphy	6
(Wales) Ryan Day	4
(Thailand) Kritsanut Lertsattayathorn	6
(England) Mark Davis	6
(England) Michael Holt	1
(Scotland) John Higgins	6
(India) Kamal Chawla	3
(Thailand) James Wattana	4
(England) Stuart Bingham	6

Last 16; Best of 11 frames
(Wales) Dominic Dale	6
(Thailand) Dechawat Poomjaeng	3
(Iran) Ehsan Heidarinejad	3
(Iran) Hossein Vafaei	6
(Wales) Mark Williams	6
(England) Joe Perry	3
(Israel) Shachar Ruberg	2
(England) Ricky Walden	6
(Scotland) Stephen Maguire	6
(Wales) Jamie Clarke	0
(Thailand) Noppon Saengkham	3
(England) Shaun Murphy	6
(Thailand) Kritsanut Lertsattayathorn	6
(England) Mark Davis	2
(Scotland) John Higgins	6
(England) Stuart Bingham	5

Quarter-finals; Best of 13 frames
(Wales) Dominic Dale	7
(Iran) Hossein Vafaei	4
(Wales) Mark Williams	6
(England) Ricky Walden	7
(Scotland) Stephen Maguire	7
(England) Shaun Murphy	4
(Thailand) Kritsanut Lertsattayathorn	7
(Scotland) John Higgins	4

Semi-finals; Best of 13 frames
(Wales) Dominic Dale	1
(England) Ricky Walden	7
(Scotland) Stephen Maguire	7
(Thailand) Kritsanut Lertsattayathorn	2

Final; Best of 15 frames
(England) Ricky Walden	7
(Scotland) Stephen Maguire	8

== Maximum breaks ==
(Note: A maximum break in six-red snooker is 75.)

- Muhammad Asif
- Ken Doherty
- John Higgins
- Kritsanut Lertsattayathorn
- Robert Milkins
