= European Tour 2012/2013 – Event 1 =

Betfair European Tour 2012/2013 Event 1

Tournament information
- Dates: 23–26 August 2012
- Venue: Stadthalle
- City: Fürth
- Country: Germany
- Organisation: World Snooker
- Format: Minor-ranking event
- Total prize fund: €71,895
- Winner's share: €12,000
- Highest break: Ken Doherty (IRL) (147)

Final
- Champion: Mark Selby (ENG)
- Runner-up: Joe Swail (NIR)
- Score: 4–1

The Betfair European Tour 2012/2013 – Event 1 (also known as the 2012 Arcaden Paul Hunter Classic) was a professional minor-ranking snooker tournament that took place between 23 and 26 August 2012 in Fürth, Germany.

Ken Doherty made the 90th official maximum break during his last 128 match against Julian Treiber. This was Doherty's first official 147 break and also the second maximum break in the 2012/2013 season. Doherty also became the first player from Ireland to make an official maximum break.

Mark Selby successfully defended his 2011 title by beating Joe Swail 4–1 in the final. Swail became the first player not on the Main Tour to reach the final of a PTC event, having been relegated the previous season.

== Prize fund and ranking points ==
The breakdown of prize money and ranking points of the event is shown below:

	Prize fund	Ranking points^{1}
Winner	€12,000	2,000
Runner-up	€6,000	1,600
Semi-finalist	€3,000	1,280
Quarter-finalist	€2,000	1,000
Last 16	€1,250	760
Last 32	€750	560
Last 64	€500	360
Maximum break	€1,895	–
Total	€71,895	–

- ^{1} Only professional players can earn ranking points.

== Main draw ==
=== Preliminary rounds ===
==== Round 1 ====
Best of 7 frames

(England) Oliver Lines	4–0	(Germany) Thomas Scholl
(India) David Singh	w/d–w/o	(Brazil) Itaro Santos
(Germany) Ronny Buchholz	0–4	(Wales) Alex Taubman
(England) John Astley	4–0	(Sweden) Ron Florax
(Belgium) Sybren Sokolowski	0–4	(England) Dean Goddard
(Italy) Angelo Rizzo	1–4	(England) Adam Wicheard
(Wales) Simon Morgan	0–4	(Belgium) Wan Chooi Tang
(England) Oliver Brown	w/o–w/d	(England) Adrian Gunnell
(England) Lee Page	w/o–w/d	(Bahrain) Eyad Mohammed Al-Ansari
(Switzerland) Alexander Ursenbacher	4–0	(Netherlands) Laurin Winters
(Bahrain) Hussain Fuad	w/d–w/o	(Germany) Hendrik Henschke
(Bahrain) Rami Ali	w/d–w/o	(Germany) Stefan Schenk
(Germany) Hendrik Glax	4–2	(Germany) Klaus-Dieter Geiger
(England) Gary Steele	4–0	(Germany) Ralf Günzel
(England) Chris Norbury	4–0	(Belgium) Hans Blanckaert
(Belgium) Jeff Jacobs	w/o–w/d	(India) Lucky Vatnani
(Germany) Dieter Meier	2–4	(England) Ricky Norris
(Germany) Robert Drahn	w/d–w/o	(Croatia) Tin Venos
(England) Mitchell Mann	w/o–w/d	(Bahrain) Wael Al Qassimi
(Switzerland) Sebastian Lahruis	0–4	(Belgium) Alain Van Der Steen
(Bahrain) Mohammed Al Shaikh	w/d–w/o	(Germany) Julian Treiber
(Malta) Aaron Busuttil	w/o–w/d	(United Arab Emirates) Ali Abdul Kareem
(England) Robert Valiant	w/d–w/o	(England) John Parkin
(Austria) Benjamin Buser	w/d–w/o	(England) Jeff Cundy
(Northern Ireland) Johnny Kells	4–3	(Germany) Kilian Baur-Pantoulier
(Germany) Rüdiger Fehrmann	4–3	(Germany) Robert Hofheinz

(Germany) Phil Barnes	4–3	(Germany) Norbert Eckstein
(Iceland) Brynjar Valdimaisson	w/o–w/d	(Bahrain) Mohamed Omar
(Croatia) Dragan Roša	4–1	(Italy) Michele Battaglia
(England) James Cahill	1–4	(England) Mark Vincent
(Germany) Patrick Einsle	4–0	(Turkey) Ali Kirim
(Bahrain) Habib Subah	w/d–w/o	(Germany) Nicole Breitenstein
(England) Reanne Evans	1–4	(Austria) Andreas Ploner
(Pakistan) Shahram Changezi	w/d–w/o	(England) Terry Challenger
(Bahrain) Husain Mahmood	w/d–w/o	(England) Stuart Carrington
(England) Ian Glover	4–0	(Germany) Stefan Gerst
(France) Stéphane Ochoïski	1–4	(England) Sam Harvey
(France) Alois Riegel	1–4	(Germany) Bernd Strnad
(Germany) Michael Seidel	0–4	(Wales) Duane Jones
(Germany) Jörg Petersen	1–4	(Germany) Luca Kaufmann
(England) Elliot Slessor	1–4	(Wales) Jack Bradford
(Northern Ireland) Joe Swail	4–0	(Croatia) Bero Cerinski
(Scotland) Marc Davis	4–3	(Germany) Sascha Breuer
(Netherlands) Maurice Le Duc	w/d–w/o	(Belgium) Tomasz Skalski
(England) Greg Davis	2–4	(Wales) Kishan Hirani
(England) Joe Steele	1–4	(England) Kyren Wilson
(Germany) Felix Freede	0–4	(England) Alex Davies
(Germany) Ronny Pawlitza	1–4	(Germany) Ole Steiner
(Turkey) Soner Sari	4–0	(Germany) Andreas Vetter
(England) Christopher Keogan	w/o–w/d	(Netherlands) Mario Wehrmann
(Germany) Tobias Hirmer	4–1	(Germany) Sherief Shemeis
(Germany) Christof Biniarsch	0–4	(England) Liam Monk

==== Round 2 ====
Best of 7 frames

(England) Oliver Lines	4–2	(Brazil) Itaro Santos
(Wales) Alex Taubman	2–4	(England) John Astley
(England) Justin Astley	4–1	(England) Dean Goddard
(England) Adam Wicheard	4–1	(Belgium) Wan Chooi Tang
(England) Oliver Brown	4–2	(England) Lee Page
(Switzerland) Alexander Ursenbacher	4–0	(Germany) Hendrik Henschke
(Germany) Carl Rosenberger	4–3	(Germany) Stefan Schenk
(Croatia) Sanjin Kusan	4–0	(Germany) Hendrik Glax
(England) Gary Steele	0–4	(England) Chris Norbury
(Belgium) Jeff Jacobs	1–4	(England) Ricky Norris
(Croatia) Tin Venos	0–4	(England) Mitchell Mann
(England) Michael Wild	4–0	(Belgium) Alain Van Der Steen
(Germany) Stefan Merkel	3–4	(Germany) Julian Treiber
(Germany) Matthias Porn	0–4	(Malta) Aaron Busuttil
(England) John Parkin	2–4	(England) Jeff Cundy
(Northern Ireland) Johnny Kells	4–1	(Germany) Rüdiger Fehrmann

(Germany) Phil Barnes	w/o–w/d	(Iceland) Brynjar Valdimaisson
(England) Ben Harrison	4–0	(Croatia) Dragan Roša
(Germany) Andreas Hartung	0–4	(England) Mark Vincent
(Germany) Patrick Einsle	4–0	(Germany) Nicole Breitenstein
(Austria) Andreas Ploner	4–1	(England) Terry Challenger
(England) Stuart Carrington	0–4	(England) Ian Glover
(England) Sam Harvey	4–0	(Germany) Bernd Strnad
(Wales) Duane Jones	4–0	(Germany) Luca Kaufmann
(Wales) Jack Bradford	0–4	(Northern Ireland) Joe Swail
(Scotland) Marc Davis	4–1	(Belgium) Tomasz Skalski
(Austria) Dominik Scherübl	3–4	(Wales) Kishan Hirani
(England) Phil O'Kane	0–4	(England) Kyren Wilson
(Germany) Oliver Kremp	0–4	(England) Alex Davies
(Croatia) Darko Hojan	0–4	(Germany) Ole Steiner
(Turkey) Soner Sari	1–4	(England) Christopher Keogan
(Germany) Tobias Hirmer	1–4	(England) Liam Monk

=== Main rounds ===
==== Top half ====
===== Section 1 =====
Last 128; Best of 7 frames
(England) Jack Lisowski	4
(England) Oliver Lines	0
(Wales) Ryan Day	w/o
(Thailand) Passakorn Suwannawat	w/d
(England) Ryan Causton	3
(England) John Astley	4
(England) Gary Wilson	4
(Norway) Kurt Maflin	2
(China) Li Yan	4
(England) Justin Astley	3
(Wales) Matthew Stevens	4
(England) Adam Wicheard	1
(Wales) Jak Jones	4
(England) Oliver Brown	2
(England) Jimmy Robertson	0
(Wales) Jamie Jones	4

Last 64; Best of 7 frames
(England) Jack Lisowski	2
(Wales) Ryan Day	4
(England) John Astley	4
(England) Gary Wilson	1
(China) Li Yan	4
(Wales) Matthew Stevens	1
(Wales) Jak Jones	1
(Wales) Jamie Jones	4

Last 32; Best of 7 frames
(Wales) Ryan Day	4
(England) John Astley	2
(China) Li Yan	3
(Wales) Jamie Jones	4

Last 16; Best of 7 frames
(Wales) Ryan Day	4
(Wales) Jamie Jones	2

===== Section 2 =====
Last 128; Best of 7 frames
(Scotland) John Higgins	4
(Scotland) Michael Leslie	2
(England) Craig Steadman	4
(Switzerland) Alexander Ursenbacher	0
(England) Ian Burns	4
(Germany) Carl Rosenberger	0
(India) Pankaj Advani	4
(England) Martin O'Donnell	0
(England) Dave Harold	3
(England) Alfie Burden	4
(Wales) Gareth Allen	0
(England) Martin Gould	4
(China) Liu Chuang	w/d
(Croatia) Sanjin Kusan	w/o
(China) Cao Yupeng	w/d
(England) Mark King	w/o

Last 64; Best of 7 frames
(Scotland) John Higgins	4
(England) Craig Steadman	1
(England) Ian Burns	1
(India) Pankaj Advani	4
(England) Alfie Burden	4
(England) Martin Gould	3
(Croatia) Sanjin Kusan	0
(England) Mark King	4

Last 32; Best of 7 frames
(Scotland) John Higgins	1
(India) Pankaj Advani	4
(England) Alfie Burden	1
(England) Mark King	4

Last 16; Best of 7 frames
(India) Pankaj Advani	4
(England) Mark King	3

===== Section 3 =====
Last 128; Best of 7 frames
(Republic of Ireland) Fergal O'Brien	3
(England) Chris Norbury	4
(Scotland) Scott Donaldson	4
(England) Ricky Norris	1
(Scotland) Marcus Campbell	4
(England) Mitchell Mann	2
(Northern Ireland) Jordan Brown	0
(England) Michael Wild	4
(China) Yu Delu	w/o
(China) Tian Pengfei	w/d
(England) Paul Davison	4
(England) Matthew Selt	2
(Republic of Ireland) Ken Doherty	4
(Germany) Julian Treiber	0
(England) Stephen Lee	4
(Malta) Aaron Busuttil	0

Last 64; Best of 7 frames
(England) Chris Norbury	2
(Scotland) Scott Donaldson	4
(Scotland) Marcus Campbell	0
(England) Michael Wild	4
(China) Yu Delu	4
(England) Paul Davison	2
(Republic of Ireland) Ken Doherty	4
(England) Stephen Lee	3

Last 32; Best of 7 frames
(Scotland) Scott Donaldson	3
(England) Michael Wild	4
(China) Yu Delu	1
(Republic of Ireland) Ken Doherty	4

Last 16; Best of 7 frames
(England) Michael Wild	3
(Republic of Ireland) Ken Doherty	4

===== Section 4 =====
Last 128; Best of 7 frames
(England) Robert Milkins	4
(England) Michael Wasley	3
(England) Robbie Williams	4
(England) Tom Ford	2
(England) Steve Davis	2
(England) Simon Bedford	4
(England) Jamie Cope	4
(England) Jeff Cundy	0
(Thailand) James Wattana	w/d
(Northern Ireland) Gerard Greene	w/o
(England) Mark Selby	4
(England) Sean O'Sullivan	0
(England) Ali Carter	4
(Northern Ireland) Johnny Kells	0
(England) Sam Baird	1
(England) Mark Davis	4

Last 64; Best of 7 frames
(England) Robert Milkins	3
(England) Robbie Williams	4
(England) Simon Bedford	1
(England) Jamie Cope	4
(Northern Ireland) Gerard Greene	0
(England) Mark Selby	4
(England) Ali Carter	2
(England) Mark Davis	4

Last 32; Best of 7 frames
(England) Robbie Williams	4
(England) Jamie Cope	2
(England) Mark Selby	4
(England) Mark Davis	3

Last 16; Best of 7 frames
(England) Robbie Williams	3
(England) Mark Selby	4

==== Bottom half ====
===== Section 5 =====
Last 128; Best of 7 frames
(Wales) Mark Williams	2
(England) Liam Highfield	4
(Thailand) Thanawat Thirapongpaiboon	w/d
(Germany) Phil Barnes	w/o
(England) Andrew Norman	4
(England) Ben Harrison	3
(Scotland) Anthony McGill	2
(England) Nigel Bond	4
(England) Ricky Walden	4
(Malta) Tony Drago	3
(England) David Grace	4
(England) Mark Vincent	0
(England) Joel Walker	4
(England) Barry Pinches	0
(Northern Ireland) Mark Allen	4
(Germany) Patrick Einsle	0

Last 64; Best of 7 frames
(England) Liam Highfield	2
(Germany) Phil Barnes	4
(England) Andrew Norman	4
(England) Nigel Bond	2
(England) Ricky Walden	4
(England) David Grace	2
(England) Joel Walker	2
(Northern Ireland) Mark Allen	4

Last 32; Best of 7 frames
(Germany) Phil Barnes	3
(England) Andrew Norman	4
(England) Ricky Walden	4
(Northern Ireland) Mark Allen	1

Last 16; Best of 7 frames
(England) Andrew Norman	4
(England) Ricky Walden	3

===== Section 6 =====
Last 128; Best of 7 frames
(England) Shaun Murphy	4
(Austria) Andreas Ploner	0
(England) Rod Lawler	4
(England) Ian Glover	2
(Scotland) Alan McManus	4
(England) Sam Harvey	1
(England) Michael Holt	4
(England) Adam Duffy	2
(England) Rory McLeod	4
(India) Aditya Mehta	2
(Belgium) Luca Brecel	4
(China) Zhang Anda	0
(England) Jimmy White	4
(Wales) Duane Jones	2
(England) Allan Taylor	3
(Northern Ireland) Joe Swail	4

Last 64; Best of 7 frames
(England) Shaun Murphy	4
(England) Rod Lawler	2
(Scotland) Alan McManus	4
(England) Michael Holt	3
(England) Rory McLeod	4
(Belgium) Luca Brecel	3
(England) Jimmy White	2
(Northern Ireland) Joe Swail	4

Last 32; Best of 7 frames
(England) Shaun Murphy	4
(Scotland) Alan McManus	1
(England) Rory McLeod	2
(Northern Ireland) Joe Swail	4

Last 16; Best of 7 frames
(England) Shaun Murphy	2
(Northern Ireland) Joe Swail	4

===== Section 7 =====
Last 128; Best of 7 frames
(Thailand) Dechawat Poomjaeng	w/d
(England) David Gilbert	w/o
(Wales) Michael White	w/o
(Egypt) Mohamed Khairy	w/d
(England) Joe Perry	4
(China) Chen Zhe	0
(England) Ben Woollaston	4
(Australia) Ben Judge	2
(China) Xiao Guodong	w/d
(Scotland) Marc Davis	w/o
(Wales) Dominic Dale	w/o
(England) Mike Dunn	w/d
(Scotland) Graeme Dott	4
(Wales) Kishan Hirani	1
(England) Stuart Bingham	4
(Hong Kong) Marco Fu	3

Last 64; Best of 7 frames
(England) David Gilbert	3
(Wales) Michael White	4
(England) Joe Perry	4
(England) Ben Woollaston	3
(Scotland) Marc Davis	0
(Wales) Dominic Dale	4
(Scotland) Graeme Dott	2
(England) Stuart Bingham	4

Last 32; Best of 7 frames
(Wales) Michael White	4
(England) Joe Perry	3
(Wales) Dominic Dale	4
(England) Stuart Bingham	0

Last 16; Best of 7 frames
(Wales) Michael White	4
(Wales) Dominic Dale	2

===== Section 8 =====
Last 128; Best of 7 frames
(Australia) Neil Robertson	4
(Wales) Daniel Wells	1
(England) Barry Hawkins	4
(England) Kyren Wilson	2
(England) Judd Trump	w/o
(Iran) Hossein Vafaei	w/d
(China) Liang Wenbo	4
(England) Alex Davies	1
(England) Mark Joyce	4
(Germany) Ole Steiner	0
(England) Anthony Hamilton	4
(England) Christopher Keogan	1
(England) Peter Lines	4
(England) Liam Monk	0
(England) Andrew Higginson	1
(Thailand) Thepchaiya Un-Nooh	4

Last 64; Best of 7 frames
(Australia) Neil Robertson	1
(England) Barry Hawkins	4
(England) Judd Trump	4
(China) Liang Wenbo	1
(England) Mark Joyce	4
(England) Anthony Hamilton	3
(England) Peter Lines	2
(Thailand) Thepchaiya Un-Nooh	4

Last 32; Best of 7 frames
(England) Barry Hawkins	4
(England) Judd Trump	3
(England) Mark Joyce	1
(Thailand) Thepchaiya Un-Nooh	4

Last 16; Best of 7 frames
(England) Barry Hawkins	4
(Thailand) Thepchaiya Un-Nooh	1

==== Finals ====
Quarter-finals; Best of 7 frames		Semi-finals; Best of 7 frames		Final; Best of 7 frames
(Wales) Ryan Day	1
(India) Pankaj Advani	4	(India) Pankaj Advani	2
(Republic of Ireland) Ken Doherty	0	(England) Mark Selby	4
(England) Mark Selby	4			(England) Mark Selby	4
(England) Andrew Norman	3			(Northern Ireland) Joe Swail	1
(Northern Ireland) Joe Swail	4	(Northern Ireland) Joe Swail	4
(Wales) Michael White	1	(England) Barry Hawkins	3
(England) Barry Hawkins	4

== Century breaks ==
- 147, 103 – Ken Doherty
- 140 – Mark Williams
- 135, 111 – Barry Hawkins
- 135, 107 – Joe Swail
- 127, 116, 112 – Mark Selby
- 122, 107 – Judd Trump
- 121, 108 – Michael White
- 120, 100 – Joe Perry
- 116 – John Astley
- 114 – Martin Gould
- 113 – Liam Highfield
- 112 – Alfie Burden
- 112 – Mark Allen
- 112 – Robbie Williams
- 111 – Oliver Lines
- 111 – Ben Harrison
- 109 – Michael Wild
- 109 – Jamie Cope
- 108 – Paul Davison
- 107 – Mark King
- 104 – Ryan Day
- 104 – Kurt Maflin
- 104 – Shaun Murphy
- 100 – Duane Jones
