= 2016 Six-red World Championship =

Six-red World Championship
Tournament information
- Dates: 5–10 September 2016
- Venue: Bangkok Convention Center
- City: Bangkok
- Country: Thailand
- Organisation: WPBSA
- Winner's share: £45,000
- Highest break: 75 (x3)

Final
- Champion: (China) Ding Junhui
- Runner-up: (England) Stuart Bingham
- Score: 8–7

The 2016 SangSom Six-red World Championship was a six-red snooker tournament held between 5 and 10 September 2016 at the Bangkok Convention Center in Bangkok, Thailand. It featured 48 players from 16 different nations.

Thepchaiya Un-Nooh was the defending champion, but he lost 2–6 in the last 16 round to Stephen Maguire. Ding Junhui won the title by beating Stuart Bingham 8–7 in the final. Bingham won the first frame of the final, but Ding then built a 3–1 lead. The match then went to 4-4. Ding later led 7-5 but did not pot any balls in the next two frames as Bingham levelled the match at 7-7. In the last frame, Ding made a clearance of 29 to win the match on the final black.

== Prize money ==
The breakdown of prize money for this year is shown below:

- Winner: 2,500,000 baht
- Runner-up: 1,000,000 baht
- Semi-finalists: 500,000 baht
- Quarter-finalists: 250,000 baht
- Last 16: 125,000 baht
- Last 32: 62,500 baht
- Group stage: 31,250 baht
- Total: 8,000,000 baht

== Round-robin stage ==
The top four players from each group qualified for the knock-out stage. All matches were best of 9 frames.

=== Group A ===
POS	Player	MP	MW	FW	FL	FD	PTS
1	(England) Mark Davis	5	5	25	7	+18	5
2	(India) Ishpreet Singh Chadha	5	3	17	16	+1	3
3	(Thailand) Thepchaiya Un-Nooh	5	3	16	19	−3	3
4	(Germany) Lukas Kleckers	5	2	17	18	−1	2
5	(England) Rod Lawler	5	1	15	22	−7	1
6	(United Arab Emirates) Mohammed Shehab	5	1	16	24	−8	1

- Thepchaiya Un-Nooh 5–2 Mohammed Shehab
- Mark Davis 5–0 Ishpreet Singh Chadha
- Rod Lawler 1–5 Lukas Kleckers
- Thepchaiya Un-Nooh 5–3 Lukas Kleckers
- Mark Davis 5–1 Rod Lawler
- Ishpreet Singh Chadha 5–3 Mohammed Shehab
- Thepchaiya Un-Nooh 5–4 Rod Lawler
- Mark Davis 5–4 Mohammed Shehab
- Ishpreet Singh Chadha 5–2 Lukas Kleckers
- Thepchaiya Un-Nooh 1–5 Ishpreet Singh Chadha
- Rod Lawler 4–5 Mohammed Shehab
- Mark Davis 5–2 Lukas Kleckers
- Thepchaiya Un-Nooh 0–5 Mark Davis
- Rod Lawler 5–2 Ishpreet Singh Chadha
- Mohammed Shehab 2–5 Lukas Kleckers

=== Group B ===
POS	Player	MP	MW	FW	FL	FD	PTS
1	(China) Liang Wenbo	5	4	23	10	+11	4
2	(Thailand) Sunny Akani	5	3	23	17	+9	3
3	(England) Martin Gould	5	3	17	15	+2	3
4	(England) Michael Holt	5	2	21	19	−4	2
5	(Egypt) Basem Eltahhan	5	2	12	23	−7	2
6	(Hong Kong) Chau Hon Man	5	1	12	24	−11	1

- Martin Gould 5–0 Basem Eltahhan
- Liang Wenbo 5–0 Chau Hon Man
- Michael Holt 4–5 Sunny Akani
- Martin Gould 0–5 Sunny Akani
- Liang Wenbo 5–3 Michael Holt
- Chau Hon Man 4–5 Basem Eltahhan
- Martin Gould 5–1 Chau Hon Man
- Michael Holt 5–2 Basem Eltahhan
- Liang Wenbo 3–5 Sunny Akani
- Chau Hon Man 5–4 Sunny Akani
- Liang Wenbo 5–0 Basem Eltahhan
- Martin Gould 5–4 Michael Holt
- Martin Gould 2–5 Liang Wenbo
- Michael Holt 5–2 Chau Hon Man
- Basem Eltahhan 5–4 Sunny Akani

=== Group C ===
POS	Player	MP	MW	FW	FL	FD	PTS
1	(India) Pankaj Advani	5	5	25	9	+16	5
2	(England) Robert Milkins	5	3	22	18	+4	3
3	(Wales) Dominic Dale	5	3	18	17	+1	3
4	(China) Ding Junhui	5	2	17	17	0	2
5	(Thailand) Phaitoon Phonbun	5	2	12	19	−7	2
6	(Australia) Ryan Thomerson	5	0	11	25	−14	0

- Ding Junhui 4–5 Pankaj Advani
- Robert Milkins 5–4 Ryan Thomerson
- Dominic Dale 3–5 Phaitoon Phonbun
- Robert Milkins 5–1 Phaitoon Phonbun
- Ding Junhui 5–1 Phaitoon Phonbun
- Robert Milkins 3–5 Dominic Dale
- Ryan Thomerson 1–5 Pankaj Advani
- Ding Junhui 3–5 Robert Milkins
- Dominic Dale 5–4 Ryan Thomerson
- Pankaj Advani 5–0 Phaitoon Phonbun
- Ding Junhui 0–5 Dominic Dale
- Robert Milkins 4–5 Pankaj Advani
- Ryan Thomerson 1–5 Phaitoon Phonbun
- Ding Junhui 5–1 Ryan Thomerson
- Dominic Dale 0–5 Pankaj Advani

=== Group D ===
POS	Player	MP	MW	FW	FL	FD	PTS
1	(England) David Gilbert	5	4	23	12	+11	4
2	(Thailand) Kritsanut Lertsattayathorn	5	3	20	16	+4	3
3	(England) Ricky Walden	5	3	17	13	+4	3
4	(England) Ben Woollaston	5	2	14	17	−3	2
5	(Egypt) Ahmed Galal	5	2	15	22	−7	2
6	(Wales) Andrew Pagett	5	1	12	21	−9	1

- Ricky Walden 5–1 Kritsanut Lertsattayathorn
- David Gilbert 5–2 Ben Woollaston
- Andrew Pagett 3–5 Ahmed Galal
- David Gilbert 5–0 Andrew Pagett
- Ben Woollaston 1–5 Kritsanut Lertsattayathorn
- Ricky Walden 1–5 Andrew Pagett
- Ben Woollaston 5–0 Ahmed Galal
- David Gilbert 3–5 Kritsanut Lertsattayathorn
- Ricky Walden 5–1 Ahmed Galal
- Ricky Walden 5–1 Ben Woollaston
- David Gilbert 5–4 Ahmed Galal
- Andrew Pagett 2–5 Kritsanut Lertsattayathorn
- Ricky Walden 1–5 David Gilbert
- Ben Woollaston 5–2 Andrew Pagett
- Ahmed Galal 5–4 Kritsanut Lertsattayathorn

=== Group E ===
POS	Player	MP	MW	FW	FL	FD	PTS
1	(England) Stuart Bingham	5	5	25	6	+19	5
2	(Wales) Ryan Day	5	4	20	14	+6	4
3	(Thailand) James Wattana	5	3	20	16	+4	3
4	(Wales) Darren Morgan	5	1	15	24	−9	1
5	(England) Wayne Brown	5	1	14	24	−10	1
6	(Pakistan) Babar Masih	5	1	14	24	−10	1

- Babar Masih 1–5 James Wattana
- Stuart Bingham 5–1 Babar Masih
- Ryan Day 5–1 Darren Morgan
- Wayne Brown 2–5 James Wattana
- Stuart Bingham 5–2 Darren Morgan
- Wayne Brown 4–5 Babar Masih
- Ryan Day 5–4 James Wattana
- Stuart Bingham 5–1 James Wattana
- Ryan Day 5–1 Wayne Brown
- Darren Morgan 5–4 Babar Masih
- Stuart Bingham 5–0 Ryan Day
- Wayne Brown 5–4 Darren Morgan
- Stuart Bingham 5–2 Wayne Brown
- Ryan Day 5–3 Babar Masih
- Wayne Brown 3–5 James Wattana

=== Group F ===
POS	Player	MP	MW	FW	FL	FD	PTS
1	(England) Joe Perry	5	5	25	11	+14	5
2	(Thailand) Noppon Saengkham	5	4	21	14	+7	4
3	(Wales) Michael White	5	3	22	13	+9	3
4	(Russia) Ivan Kakovsky	5	2	14	23	−9	2
5	(India) Sourav Kothari	5	1	13	20	−7	1
6	(Egypt) Hesham Abdelhmed	5	0	11	25	−14	0

- Joe Perry 5–4 Hesham Abdelhmed
- Michael White 5–3 Sourav Kothari
- Ivan Kakovsky 3–5 Noppon Saengkham
- Joe Perry 5–1 Ivan Kakovsky
- Sourav Kothari 0–5 Noppon Saengkham
- Joe Perry 5–4 Michael White
- Ivan Kakovsky 5–4 Sourav Kothari
- Hesham Abdelhmed 3–5 Noppon Saengkham
- Joe Perry 5–1 Noppon Saengkham
- Michael White 5–0 Ivan Kakovsky
- Sourav Kothari 5–0 Hesham Abdelhmed
- Michael White 5–0 Hesham Abdelhmed
- Ivan Kakovsky 5–4 Hesham Abdelhmed
- Joe Perry 5–1 Sourav Kothari
- Michael White 3–5 Noppon Saengkham

=== Group G ===
POS	Player	MP	MW	FW	FL	FD	PTS
1	(Scotland) Stephen Maguire	5	4	24	13	+11	4
2	(China) Yuan Sijun	5	4	22	17	+5	4
3	(Thailand) Suchakree Poomjang	5	3	21	15	+6	3
4	(Wales) Mark Williams	5	3	21	17	+4	3
5	(Poland) Mateusz Baranowski	5	1	11	21	−10	1
6	(New Zealand) Daniell Haenga	5	0	9	25	−16	0

- Mateusz Baranowski 5–1 Daniell Haenga
- Mark Williams 3–5 Yuan Sijun
- Stephen Maguire 5–3 Daniell Haenga
- Mateusz Baranowski 1–5 Suchakree Poomjaeng
- Mark Williams 5–3 Daniell Haenga
- Mateusz Baranowski 4–5 Yuan Sijun
- Stephen Maguire 4–5 Suchakree Poomjaeng
- Mark Williams 5–1 Mateusz Baranowski
- Stephen Maguire 5–2 Yuan Sijun
- Daniell Haenga 0–5 Suchakree Poomjaeng
- Mark Williams 3–5 Stephen Maguire
- Yuan Sijun 5–3 Suchakree Poomjaeng
- Mark Williams 5–3 Suchakree Poomjaeng
- Stephen Maguire 5–0 Daniell Haenga
- Daniell Haenga 2–5 Yuan Sijun

=== Group H ===
POS	Player	MP	MW	FW	FL	FD	PTS
1	(England) Mark Selby	5	4	24	14	+10	4
2	(Belgium) Luca Brecel	5	4	20	10	+10	4
3	(England) Matthew Selt	5	3	21	15	+6	3
4	(Thailand) Boonyarit Keattikun	5	2	18	20	−2	2
5	(Australia) Peter McCullagh	5	2	12	15	−3	2
6	(Malaysia) Moh Keen Ho	5	0	4	25	−21	0

- Mark Selby 5–3 Keen Hoo Moh
- Matthew Selt 5–2 Peter McCullagh
- Luca Brecel 5–3 Boonyarit Keattikun
- Mark Selby 4–5 Luca Brecel
- Matthew Selt 5–0 Keen Hoo Moh
- Peter McCullagh 4–5 Boonyarit Keattikun
- Matthew Selt 5–3 Boonyarit Keattikun
- Luca Brecel 5–0 Keen Hoo Moh
- Mark Selby 5–1 Peter McCullagh
- Mark Selby 5–2 Boonyarit Keattikun
- Matthew Selt 3–5 Luca Brecel
- Peter McCullagh 5–0 Keen Hoo Moh
- Mark Selby 5–3 Matthew Selt
- Luca Brecel w/d–w/o Peter McCullagh
- Keen Hoo Moh 1–5 Boonyarit Keattikun

== Knockout stage ==
Last 32; Best of 11 frames
(England) Mark Davis	4
(China) Ding Junhui	6
(Wales) Ryan Day	6
(Thailand) Suchakree Poomjang	3
(Thailand) Noppon Saengkham	6
(England) Matthew Selt	3
(China) Liang Wenbo	6
(England) Ben Woollaston	4
(India) Pankaj Advani	6
(Germany) Lukas Kleckers	0
(China) Yuan Sijun	6
(Thailand) James Wattana	0
(Wales) Michael White	6
(England) Mark Selby	4
(England) Michael Holt	6
(England) David Gilbert	2
(England) Stuart Bingham	6
(Wales) Mark Williams	5
(Wales) Dominic Dale	6
(India) Ishpreet Singh Chadha	0
(Thailand) Sunny Akani	6
(Thailand) Kritsanut Lertsattayathorn	3
(England) Joe Perry	6
(Thailand) Boonyarit Keattikun	5
(Scotland) Stephen Maguire	6
(Wales) Darren Morgan	0
(Thailand) Thepchaiya Un-Nooh	6
(England) Robert Milkins	2
(England) Ricky Walden	6
(England) Martin Gould	2
(Belgium) Luca Brecel	6
(Russia) Ivan Kakovsky	1

Last 16; Best of 11 frames
(China) Ding Junhui	6
(Wales) Ryan Day	3
(Thailand) Noppon Saengkham	5
(China) Liang Wenbo	6
(India) Pankaj Advani	6
(China) Yuan Sijun	4
(Wales) Michael White	1
(England) Michael Holt	6
(England) Stuart Bingham	6
(Wales) Dominic Dale	1
(Thailand) Sunny Akani	6
(England) Joe Perry	1
(Scotland) Stephen Maguire	6
(Thailand) Thepchaiya Un-Nooh	2
(England) Ricky Walden	5
(Belgium) Luca Brecel	6

Quarter-finals; Best of 13 frames
(China) Ding Junhui	7
(China) Liang Wenbo	2
(India) Pankaj Advani	w/o
(England) Michael Holt	w/d
(England) Stuart Bingham	7
(Thailand) Sunny Akani	4
(Scotland) Stephen Maguire	7
(Belgium) Luca Brecel	6

Semi-finals; Best of 13 frames
(China) Ding Junhui	7
(India) Pankaj Advani	4
(England) Stuart Bingham	7
(Scotland) Stephen Maguire	1

Final; Best of 15 frames
(China) Ding Junhui	8
(England) Stuart Bingham	7

== Final ==
Final: Best of 15 frames. Referee: Bangkok Convention Center, Bangkok, Thailand, 10 September 2016.
Ding Junhui; China	8–7	Stuart Bingham; England
26–34, 57–14, 72–0 (72), 46–0, 0–70 (70), 67–0 (67), 25–35, 0–40, 56–0, 56–0, 0–65, 52–8, 0–39, 0–49, 33–29
72	Highest break	70
2	50+ breaks	1

== Maximum breaks ==
(Note: A maximum break in six-red snooker is 75.)

- Matthew Selt
- Liang Wenbo
- Pankaj Advani
