= Pankaj Advani (billiards player) =

Indian billiards and snooker player

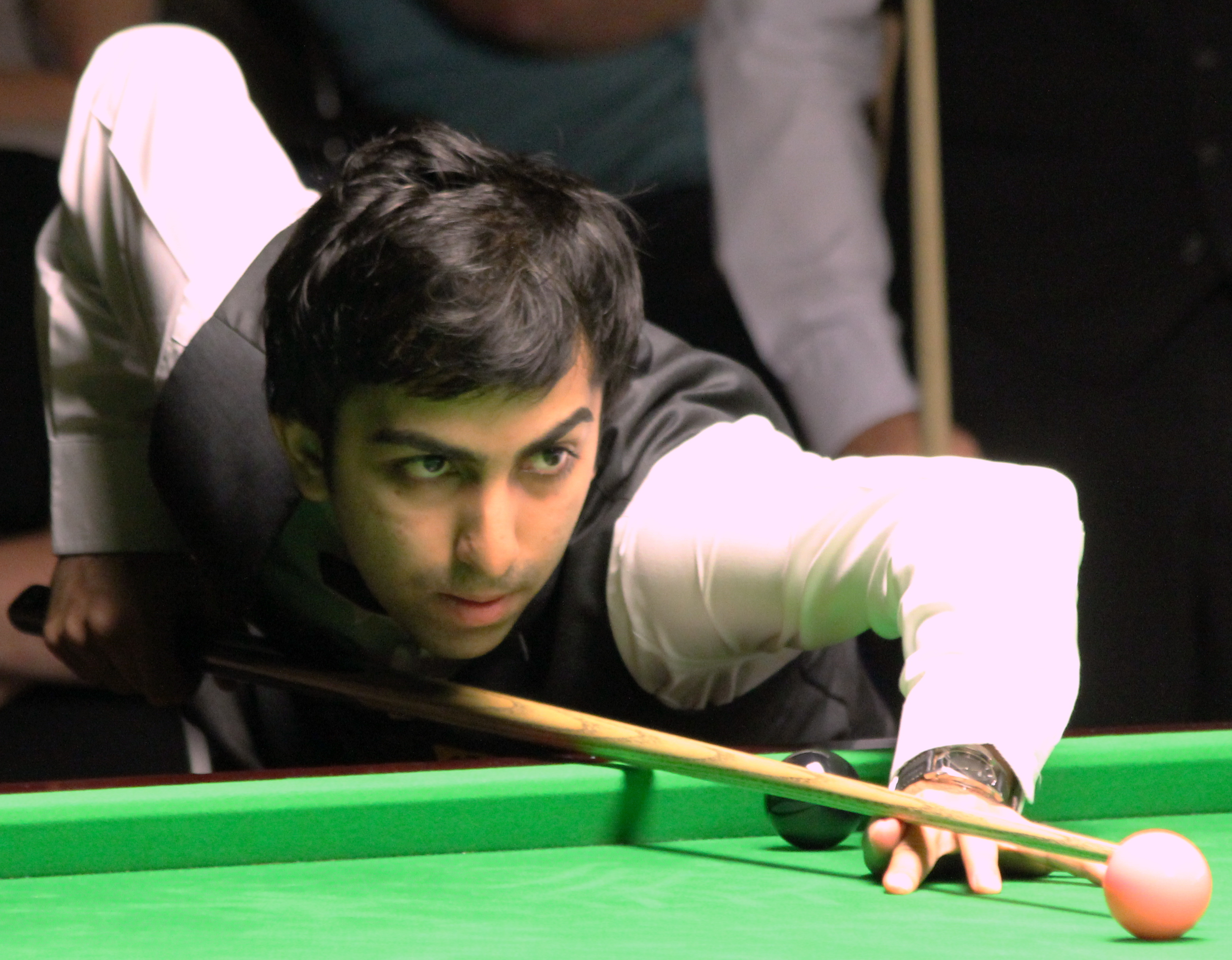
- Advani at the 2012 Paul Hunter Classic

Personal information
- Nickname: The Prince of Pune
- Born: 24 July 1985 (age 41) Pune, Maharashtra, India

Sport
- Country: India
- Sport: Snooker
- Professional: 2012–2014
- Best ranking finish: Quarter-final (x2)
Medal record
Men's English billiards
Representing India
Asian Games
Gold medal – first place	2006 Doha	Singles
Gold medal – first place	2010 Guangzhou	Singles

- IBSF World Billiards Champion: 17

Pankaj Arjan Advani (born 24 July 1985) is an Indian billiards and professional snooker player. He is a 29-time International Billiards and Snooker Federation (IBSF) world champion. He has won 20 billiards world titles, the IBSF World Billiards Championship on 17 occasions and the World Team Billiards Championship once. In snooker, he won the IBSF World Snooker Championship three times, IBSF World six-red championship twice and the IBSF World Team Cup and IBSF World Team Championship one time each. He has the record number of IBSF world championships. He became a snooker professional in 2012/2013.

In recognition of his achievements, the Government of India has bestowed several awards upon Advani: the Arjuna Award in 2004, Major Dhyan Chand Khel Ratna in 2006, Padma Shri in 2009 and Padma Bhushan in 2018.

== Early life ==
Pankaj Advani was born on 24 July 1985 to a Sindhi family in Pune, India. Advani spent his initial years in Kuwait before moving to Bangalore, India. He received his education at the Frank Anthony Public School, Bangalore and completed his bachelor's degree in commerce from Sri Bhagawan Mahaveer Jain College. He received training in snooker from former national Snooker champion Arvind Savur.

At the age of 10 his acumen for snooker came to the notice of Arvind Savur after being introduced to the sport by his elder brother Dr. Shree Advani, a noted Sport & Performance Psychologist. He won his first ever title at the age of 11 and went on to set several records at the state and national levels. In the year 2000 he won his first Indian Junior Billiards Championship title and then went on to win it again in 2001 and 2003. In 2003 he not only won the Indian Junior Snooker and Billiards Championship, he also won the senior snooker champions which made him the youngest National Snooker champion at age 17.

== Billiards career ==
Advani made his international competitive debut in 1999 at the World Billiards Championship in England. After World Snooker Champion title win in 2003, he won the IBSF World Billiards Championship in 2005 at Qawra, Malta, where he became the first to achieve a "Grand Double" by winning both the time and point formats, making him the first cueist to achieve that feat. He has won the "Grand Double" on three occasions, 2008 in Bangalore, 2014 in England and 2018 in Myanmar. He is the only Indian to have won the amateur world title in both snooker and billiards.

Advani has the distinction of winning all five national, regional, and world billiards tournaments in a single season, a feat he achieved by winning the Indian Junior National Championship and Senior National Championship, the Asian Billiards Championship, and both the World Billiards Championship (point format) and World Billiards Championship (time format) in 2005.

In April 2012, Advani won the Asian Billiards Championship in Goa, India to become the first player to win 5 Asian Billiards Champion titles. It was announced in May that Advani had accepted the Indian wildcard place on the main snooker tour for the 2012–13 season.

In October 2012, in Leeds, England, Advani won his seventh (counting professional and amateur) World Billiards Championship title, eighth world title overall, beating defending and nine-time WPBSA World Billiards Champion Mike Russell again, in the timed division final (Advani did not make it to the points division final).

On 14 August 2014, Advani helped win the first ever World Team Billiards Championship held in Glasgow, Scotland, along with Rupesh Shah, Devendra Joshi and Ashok Shandilya.

On 2 February 2017, Pankaj Advani won his 29th National Championship Title at the PYC Hindu Gymkhana in Pune, India. This gave him a 39 match-winning streak. Overall, as of 2017 Advani had won 60 titles: 19 world titles; 8 Asian titles; 2 Asian Games titles; 1 Australian Open title and 30 national titles.

In 2018, Advani won his 7th Asian Billiards Title in Myanmar making him the maximum holder of the Asian Title. On March 11, 2020, won the 6 reds national snooker championship in Ahmedabad taking his total tally of national champions to 34. (11 junior and 23 senior).

== Snooker career ==
Pankaj Advani, on international competitive debut in the discipline, won the IBSF World Snooker Championship (i.e. the World Amateur Snooker Championship) on 25 October 2003 in Jiangmen, China. He was 18 years old, and became the youngest Indian to win the title, his first world title. When he was 28-years-old, at the IBSF World 6-Red World Snooker Championship in Sharm-El-Sheik, Egypt, a feat he repeated in August 2015 after he successfully defended the title in Karachi, Pakistan.

As a new player on the tour, Advani would need to win four matches to reach the main stage of the ranking events. He did this in just his fourth attempt, when qualifying for the International Championship. He defeated Craig Steadman 6–1, six-time world champion Steve Davis 6–5 (after being 1–4 down), Alan McManus 6–3 and Michael Holt 6–4 to reach the venue stage for the first time. He made four century breaks during qualification, the most of any player. Advani was to play a wildcard match once at the tournament in Chengdu, China, to reach the last 32, however he decided to withdraw from the tournament to take part in the World Billiards Championship, which he went on to win. He also reached the semi-finals of the minor ranking European Tour Event 1, beating four-time world champion John Higgins 4–1 along the way. Advani lost to Mark Selby 2–4. Advani played in eight of the ten of these Players Tour Championship events and finished 40th on the Order of Merit.

At the 2013 Welsh Open, he became the first Indian player to reach the quarter-final stage of a ranking event with a 4–1 win over Graeme Dott in the last 16, but lost 2–5 to Judd Trump. Advani's season ended when he was beaten 8–10 by Joe Swail in the first round of World Championship Qualifying. He was ranked world number 74 after his first year on the main snooker tour.

=== 2013/2014 ===
Advani with the World Billiards Championship Trophy in 2026

The 2013–14 season saw the introduction of a ranking event in Advani's home country of India for the first time which he qualified for by beating Matthew Selt 4–0. At the tournament in New Delhi Advani defeated Marcus Campbell 4–1 and Mark Allen 4–2. His match with Allen finished at 11 pm local time, with Advani back in last 16 action at 10 am the next morning to play Stuart Bingham. The match went to a deciding frame and when Bingham broke down on a break of 30, Advani stepped in to compose a match winning 86. Advani played compatriot Aditya Mehta in the quarter-finals in an iconic match in Indian snooker as the winner would be the country's first ranking event semi-finalist. The match was heavily focused on safety and it was Mehta who advanced with a 4–3 win. His best run in a ranking event during the rest of the season was at the World Open, where he narrowly beat Xiao Guodong 5–4 to set up a last 32 meeting with Ding Junhui. Advani had a lead of 4–2 in the best of nine frame match and was 35 points to 0 ahead in the seventh frame to be on the cusp of a shock result against the player who had already won four ranking events this season. However, Ding made a break of 52 to win the frame, compiled a 136 to draw level and won the deciding frame in one visit to defeat Advani. Advani's successful season saw him finish inside the top 64 in the world rankings for the first time as he was placed 56th.

=== 2014/2015 ===
Advani didn't enter any tournaments until September 2014, when he announced that he was relinquishing his snooker tour card to concentrate on his billiards career and spend more time with his family. He received an invite to participate in the wildcard round of the 2015 Indian Open, but lost 4–3 to Rhys Clark.

=== 2015/2016 ===
In May 2016 he won the Asian 6-Red Snooker title. He became the first player in the world to hold the world title as well as the continental title at the same time after he beat Malaysian Keen Hoh Moh 7–5. In the same tournament, Advani sailed to the semi-finals of the World Amateur Snooker Championship where he lost to Thailand's Kritsanut Lertsattayathorn.

=== 2016/2017 ===
Advani received an entry in to the wildcard round of the Indian Open and he beat Fang Xiongman 4–2 and Elliot Slessor 4–0, before losing 4–3 to Stephen Maguire in the third round. He won all of his group matches at the Six-red World Championship and then eliminated Lukas Kleckers 6–0 and Yuan Sijun 6–4. Michael Holt withdrew from the event which moved Advani straight in to the semi-finals, where he was defeated 7–4 by Ding Junhui.

== Performance and rankings timeline of professional snooker ==
Tournament	2004/ 05	2012/ 13	2013/ 14	2014/ 15	2015/ 16	2016/ 17
Ranking (Note: From the 2012/2013 season it shows the ranking at the beginning of the season.)	(Note: He was an amateur.)	(Note: New players don't have a ranking.)	74	(Note: Since September 2014 he was an amateur.)		
Ranking tournaments
Indian Open	Not Held		QF	WR	NH	2R
World Open (Note: The event was called the Grand Prix (2004/2005))	A	LQ	2R	Not Held		A
Shanghai Masters	NH	LQ	LQ	A	A	A
International Championship	NH	WD	1R	A	A	A
UK Championship	A	LQ	1R	A	A	A
German Masters	NH	LQ	LQ	A	A	A
Welsh Open	A	QF	1R	A	A	A
Players Championship Grand Final (Note: The event was called the Players Tour Championship Grand Finals (2012/2013))	NH	DNQ	DNQ	DNQ	DNQ	DNQ
China Open	A	LQ	1R	A	A	A
World Championship	A	LQ	LQ	A	A	A
Non-ranking tournaments
Six-red World Championship	NH	RR	A	A	2R	SF
Former ranking tournaments
Wuxi Classic	NH	LQ	LQ	A	Not Held	
Australian Goldfields Open	NH	LQ	LQ	A	A	NH
Former non-ranking tournaments
General Cup (Note: The event was called the General Cup International (2004/2005–2011/2012))	RR	A	A	A	A	NH

Performance Table Legend
LQ	lost in the qualifying draw	#R	lost in the early rounds of the tournament (WR = Wildcard round, RR = Round robin)	QF	lost in the quarter-finals
SF	lost in the semi-finals	F	lost in the final	W	won the tournament
DNQ	did not qualify for the tournament	A	did not participate in the tournament	WD	withdrew from the tournament

NH / Not Held	means an event was not held.
NR / Non-Ranking Event	means an event is/was no longer a ranking event.
R / Ranking Event	means an event is/was a ranking event.
MR / Minor-Ranking Event	means an event is/was a minor-ranking event.

== Titles ==
World Titles – 29

Billiards

IBSF World Billiards Championship (Point Format) – 8 (2005, 2008, 2014, 2016, 2017, 2018, 2019, 2022)

IBSF World Billiards Championship (Long Format) – 9 (2005, 2007, 2008, 2009, 2012, 2014, 2015, 2018, 2023)

World Billiards Championship (English billiards) (Timed Format) – 4 (2009, 2012, 2014, 2026)

World Billiards Championship (English billiards) (Short Format) – 1 (2014)

World Team Billiards Championship – 1 (2014)

Snooker

IBSF World Snooker Championship (15 Reds) – 3 (2003, 2015, 2017)

IBSF World Snooker Championship (6 Reds) – 2 (2014, 2015)

IBSF 6-Red Snooker World Cup – 1 (2021)

IBSF World Team Cup – 1 (2018)

IBSF World Team Championship – 1 (2019)

Asian Games

2006 Asian Games, Doha - Gold Medal (English Billiards – Singles)

2010 Asian Games, Guangzhou – Gold Medal (English Billiards – Singles)

Asian Titles – 13

Billiards – 9 (2005, 2008, 2009, 2010, 2012, 2017, 2018, 2022, 2023)

Snooker – 4

Asian Snooker Title (6 Reds) – 2016

Asian Snooker Title (15 Reds) – 2019, 2021

Asian Team Snooker Title (2017)

National Championships - 34

Junior National Billiards – 7

Junior National Snooker – 4

Senior National Billiards – 10

Senior National Snooker (15 Reds) – 9

Senior National Snooker (6 Reds) – 4

English Billiards

World Billiards Championship (English billiards): 2009, 2012, 2014, 2026

IBSF World Billiards Championship

== Awards and honours ==
- Padma Bhushan, India's third highest civilian honour, 2018
- Major Dhyan Chand Khel Ratna, India's highest sporting honour, 2005–06
- Rajyotsava Prashasti, Karnataka's second highest civilian honour, 2007.
- Karnataka's "Kempegowda Award", 2007.
- Ekalavya Award, Karnataka's highest sporting honour, 2007
- Vision of India's "International Indian" Award, 2005.
- Senior Sportsperson of the Year, 2005
- The Sports Writers' Association of Bangalore Award, 2005
- The Bangalore University Sportsperson of the Year, 2005
- The Hero India Sports Award, 2004
- The Rajeev Gandhi Award, 2004
- The Arjuna Award, 2004
- The Indo-American Young Achiever's Award, 2003
- The Sports Star Sportsperson of the Year, 2003
