= 2016–17 snooker season =

Series of snooker tournaments

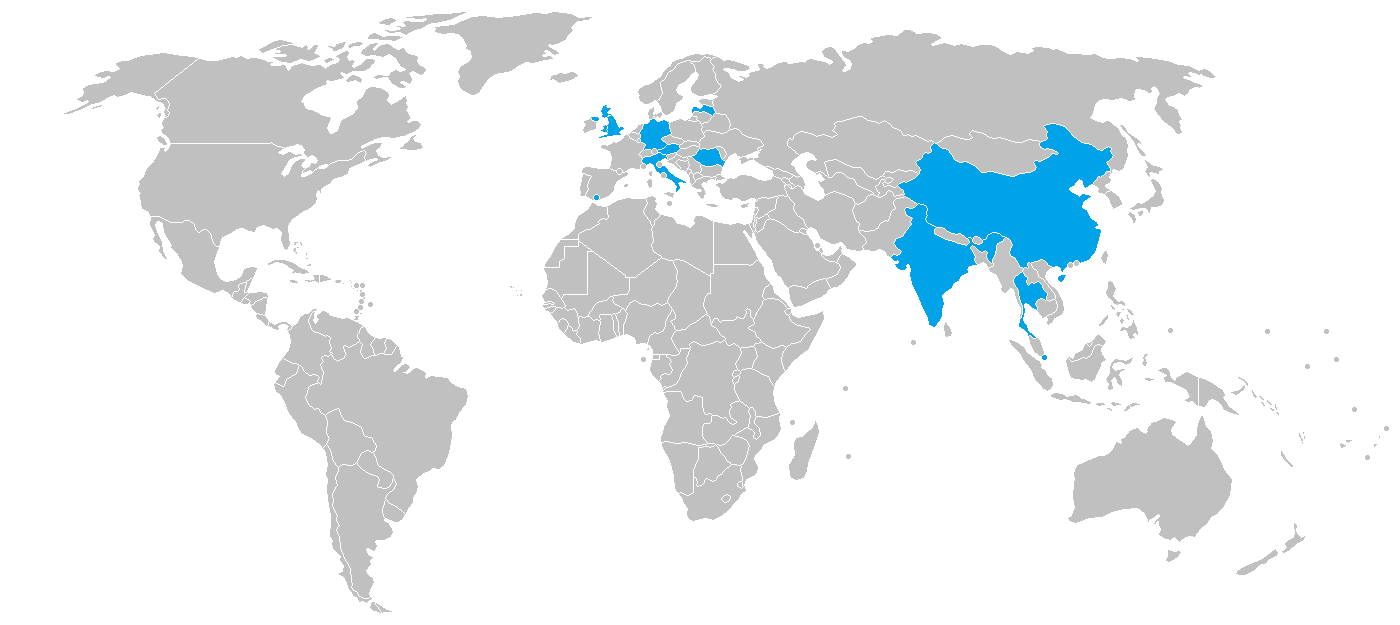
- Nations that hosted an event in the snooker calendar during the 2016–17 season

Details
- Duration: 5 May 2016 – 1 May 2017
- Tournaments: 37 (19 ranking events)

Triple Crown winners
- UK Championship: Mark Selby (ENG)
- Masters: Ronnie O'Sullivan (ENG)
- World Championship: Mark Selby (ENG)

The 2016–17 snooker season was a series of professional snooker tournaments played between 5 May 2016 and 1 May 2017.

The number of ranking events was increased in 2016/17, with a target of 20 ranking events for 2017/18. According to the World Snooker chairman Barry Hearn, total prize money for the World Snooker Tour in 2016/17 hit £10 million for the first time ever. The trophy for the Masters was renamed the Paul Hunter trophy in perpetuity, in memory of the three-time Masters champion who died in 2006.

The Snooker Shoot Out became a ranking event for the first time. The Australian Goldfields Open was cancelled.

The Players Championship featured the top-16 players on the one year ranking list, as the Players Tour Championship has been cancelled and no order of merit was issued.

The new Home Nations Series was introduced in this season with the English Open, Northern Ireland Open, Scottish Open and Welsh Open tournaments. The winner of all four tournaments could earn a massive £1 million bonus prize.

Mark Selby won five ranking events during the season with Anthony McGill and Judd Trump each winning twice. Trump appeared in five ranking event finals during the season.

== Players ==
The top 64 players from the prize money rankings after the 2016 World Championship, and the 30 players earning a two-year card the previous year automatically qualified for the season (Vinnie Calabrese has resigned his membership). The top eight players from the European Tour Order of Merit and top two players from the Asian Tour Order of Merit, who have not already qualified for the Main Tour, also qualify. Another two players come from the EBSA Qualifying Tour Play-Offs, and a further twelve places were available through the Q School. The rest of the places on to the tour come from the amateur events and national governing body nominations. Yan Bingtao's two-year tour card will commence this season. Also, since Steve Davis and Stephen Hendry have both retired from professional play, only James Wattana was offered an Invitational Tour Card. The list of all professional players in the 2016/2017 season includes 129 players.

=== New professional players ===
All players listed below received a tour card for two seasons.

International champions

1. IBSF World Championship runner-up: Zhao Xintong (CHN)
  (Note: Champion Pankaj Advani declined his invitation to the main tour)
2. IBSF World Under-21 Championship winner: Boonyarit Keattikun (THA)
3. EBSA European Championship winner: Jak Jones (WAL)
4. EBSA European Under-21 Championship winner: Josh Boileau (IRL)
5. ACBS Asian Championship winner: Kritsanut Lertsattayathorn (THA)
6. ACBS Asian Under-21 Championship winner: Wang Yuchen (CHN)
7. Oceania Championship winner: Kurt Dunham (AUS)

European Tour Order of Merit

8. Thor Chuan Leong (MAS)
9. Lee Walker (WAL)
10. Mitchell Mann (ENG)
11. Aditya Mehta (IND)
12. Scott Donaldson (SCO)
13. Hammad Miah (ENG)
14. Anthony Hamilton (ENG)
15. Liam Highfield (ENG)

Asian Tour Order of Merit

16. Leo Fernandez (IRL)
  (Note: handed 15-month ban after admitting corruption charge)
17. Zhang Anda (CHN)

EBSA Qualifying Tour Play-Offs

18. Sam Craigie (ENG)
19. Elliot Slessor (ENG)

Q School

Main article: 2016 Q School

Event 1

20. Fang Xiongman (CHN)
21. Christopher Keogan (ENG)
22. Cao Yupeng (CHN)
23. Chen Zhe (CHN)

Event 2

24. Michael Georgiou (CYP)
25. John Astley (ENG)
26. Alex Borg (MLT)
27. David John (WAL)

Order of Merit

28. Craig Steadman (ENG)
29. Jamie Curtis-Barrett (ENG)
30. Ian Preece (WAL)
31. Adam Duffy (ENG)

CBSA China Tour

32. Rouzi Maimaiti (CHN)
33. Mei Xiwen (CHN)

Invitational Tour Card

35. James Wattana (THA)

Deferred Tour Card

36. Yan Bingtao (CHN)
  (Note: his tour card held over from last year)

== Calendar ==
The following tables outline the dates and results of all events of the World Snooker Tour, World Women's Snooker, the World Seniors Tour, and other events.

=== World Snooker Tour ===
Start	Finish	Tournament	Venue	Winner	Score	Runner-up	Ref.
22 Jun	24 Jun	Riga Masters	Arena Riga in Riga, Latvia	Neil Robertson (AUS)	5‍–‍2	Michael Holt (ENG)	
5 Jul	9 Jul	Indian Open	HICC Novotel Hotel in Hyderabad, India	Anthony McGill (SCO)	5‍–‍2	Kyren Wilson (ENG)	
25 Jul	31 Jul	World Open	Yushan No.1 Middle School in Yushan, China	Ali Carter (ENG)	10‍–‍8	Joe Perry (ENG)	
24 Aug	28 Aug	Paul Hunter Classic	Stadthalle in Fürth, Germany	Mark Selby (ENG)	4‍–‍2	Tom Ford (ENG)	
5 Sep	10 Sep	Six-red World Championship†	Bangkok Convention Center in Bangkok, Thailand	Ding Junhui (CHN)	8‍–‍7	Stuart Bingham (ENG)	
19 Sep	25 Sep	Shanghai Masters	Shanghai Grand Stage in Shanghai, China	Ding Junhui (CHN)	10‍–‍6	Mark Selby (ENG)	
3 Oct	9 Oct	European Masters	Globus Circus in Bucharest, Romania	Judd Trump (ENG)	9‍–‍8	Ronnie O'Sullivan (ENG)	
10 Oct	16 Oct	English Open	EventCity in Manchester, England	Liang Wenbo (CHN)	9‍–‍6	Judd Trump (ENG)	
23 Oct	30 Oct	International Championship	Baihu Media Broadcasting Centre in Daqing, China	Mark Selby (ENG)	10‍–‍1	Ding Junhui (CHN)	
1 Nov	5 Nov	China Championship†	Guangzhou Gymnasium in Guangzhou, China	John Higgins (SCO)	10‍–‍7	Stuart Bingham (ENG)	
7 Nov	12 Nov	Champion of Champions†	Ricoh Arena in Coventry, England	John Higgins (SCO)	10‍–‍7	Ronnie O'Sullivan (ENG)	
14 Nov	20 Nov	Northern Ireland Open	Titanic Belfast in Belfast, Northern Ireland	Mark King (ENG)	9‍–‍8	Barry Hawkins (ENG)	
22 Nov	4 Dec	UK Championship	Barbican Centre in York, England	Mark Selby (ENG)	10‍–‍7	Ronnie O'Sullivan (ENG)	
12 Dec	18 Dec	Scottish Open	Commonwealth Arena in Glasgow, Scotland	Marco Fu (HKG)	9‍–‍4	John Higgins (SCO)	
15 Jan	22 Jan	Masters†	Alexandra Palace in London, England	Ronnie O'Sullivan (ENG)	10‍–‍7	Joe Perry (ENG)	
1 Feb	5 Feb	German Masters	Tempodrom in Berlin, Germany	Anthony Hamilton (ENG)	9‍–‍6	Ali Carter (ENG)	
6 Feb	12 Feb	World Grand Prix	Preston Guild Hall in Preston, England	Barry Hawkins (ENG)	10‍–‍7	Ryan Day (WAL)	
13 Feb	19 Feb	Welsh Open	Motorpoint Arena in Cardiff, Wales	Stuart Bingham (ENG)	9‍–‍8	Judd Trump (ENG)	
23 Feb	26 Feb	Shoot Out	Watford Colosseum in Watford, England	Anthony McGill (SCO)	1‍–‍0	Xiao Guodong (CHN)	
2 Jan	2 Mar	Championship League†	Ricoh Arena in Coventry, England	John Higgins (SCO)	3‍–‍0	Ryan Day (WAL)	
3 Mar	5 Mar	Gibraltar Open	Tercentenary Sports Hall, Victoria Stadium in Gibraltar, Gibraltar	Shaun Murphy (ENG)	4‍–‍2	Judd Trump (ENG)	
6 Mar	12 Mar	Players Championship	Venue Cymru in Llandudno, Wales	Judd Trump (ENG)	10‍–‍8	Marco Fu (HKG)	
27 Mar	2 Apr	China Open	Beijing University Students' Gymnasium in Beijing, China	Mark Selby (ENG)	10‍–‍8	Mark Williams (WAL)	
15 Apr	1 May	World Championship	Crucible Theatre in Sheffield, England	Mark Selby (ENG)	18‍–‍15	John Higgins (SCO)	

Ranking event
† Non-ranking event

=== World Ladies Billiards and Snooker ===
Start	Finish	Tournament	Venue	Winner	Score	Runner-up	Ref.
25 Aug	28 Aug	Paul Hunter Ladies Classic	Ballroom in Nuremberg, Germany	Ng On-Yee (HKG)	4‍–‍1	Reanne Evans (ENG)	
7 Oct	8 Oct	UK Ladies Championship	Northern Snooker Centre in Leeds, England	Reanne Evans (ENG)	5‍–‍1	Tatjana Vasiljeva (LAT)	
14 Jan	15 Jan	Eden Women's Masters	Cueball Derby in Derby, England	Reanne Evans (ENG)	4‍–‍0	So Man Yan (HKG)	
18 Feb		Connie Gough Trophy	Dunstable Snooker Club in Dunstable, England	Maria Catalano (ENG)	4‍–‍2	Rebecca Kenna (ENG)	
13 Mar	19 Mar	World Women's Championship	Lagoon Billiard Room in Toa Payoh, Singapore	Ng On-Yee (HKG)	6‍–‍5	Vidya Pillai (IND)	
7 Apr		World Women's 6-Red Championship	Northern Snooker Centre in Leeds, England	Ng On-Yee (HKG)	4‍–‍3	Emma Bonney (ENG)	
10 Apr		World Women's 10-Red Championship	Northern Snooker Centre in Leeds, England	Ng On-Yee (HKG)	4‍–‍2	Laura Evans (WAL)	

=== Seniors events ===
Start	Finish	Tournament	Venue	Winner	Score	Runner-up	Ref.
22 Mar	24 Mar	World Seniors Championship	Baths Hall in Scunthorpe, England	Peter Lines (ENG)	4‍–‍0	John Parrott (ENG)	

=== Other events ===
Start	Finish	Tournament	Venue	Winner	Score	Runner-up	Ref.
5 May	8 May	Vienna Open	15 Reds Köö Wien Snooker Club in Vienna, Austria	Peter Ebdon (ENG)	5‍–‍1	Mark Davis (ENG)	
8 Jun	12 Jun	Pink Ribbon	South West Snooker Academy in Gloucester, England	Jamie Jones (WAL)	4‍–‍3	David Grace (ENG)	
17 Oct	21 Oct	Haining Open	Haining Sports Center in Haining, China	Matthew Selt (ENG)	5‍–‍3	Li Hang (CHN)	
19 Dec	23 Dec	Singapore Open	Lagoon Billiard in Toa Payoh, Singapore	Boonyarit Keattikun (THA)	5‍–‍4	Noppon Saengkham (THA)	
27 Jan	29 Jan	Italian Open	Sala Torre in Bolzano, Italy	Martin O'Donnell (ENG)	3‍–‍2	Alexander Ursenbacher (SUI)	

== Points distribution ==
2016/2017 points distribution for World Snooker Tour ranking events:

Tournament/Round→	R144	R128	R96	R80	R64	R48	R32	R16	QF	SF	F	W
Riga Masters	–	0	–	–	525	–	1,050	2,250	4,500	11,250	18,750	37,500
Indian Open	–	0	–	–	2,000	–	3,000	6,000	9,000	13,500	25,000	50,000
World Open	–	0	–	–	4,000	–	6,500	8,000	12,500	21,000	40,000	90,000
Paul Hunter Classic	–	0	–	–	525	–	900	1,725	3,000	4,500	9,000	18,750
Shanghai Masters	–	0	500 (Note: Players who lose their first match receive no ranking points.)	–	2,000	3,000	6,000	8,000	12,000	19,500	35,000	85,000
European Masters	–	0	–	–	1,312	–	2,625	4,500	8,250	13,125	26,250	56,250
English Open	–	0	–	–	2,500	–	3,500	6,000	10,000	20,000	30,000	70,000
International Championship	–	0	–	–	4,000	–	7,000	12,000	17,500	30,000	65,000	125,000
Northern Ireland Open	–	0	–	–	2,500	–	3,500	6,000	10,000	20,000	30,000	70,000
UK Championship	–	0	–	–	5,000	–	10,000	15,000	22,500	35,000	75,000	170,000
Scottish Open	–	0	–	–	2,500	–	3,500	6,000	10,000	20,000	30,000	70,000
German Masters	–	0	–	–	1,500	–	3,000	3,750	7,500	15,000	26,250	60,000
World Grand Prix	–	–	–	–	–	–	5,000	7,500	12,500	20,000	40,000	100,000
Welsh Open	–	0	–	–	2,500	–	3,500	6,000	10,000	20,000	30,000	70,000
Shoot Out	–	0	–	–	500	–	1,000	2,000	4,000	8,000	16,000	32,000
Gibraltar Open	–	0	–	–	525	–	900	1,725	3,000	4,500	9,000	18,750
Players Championship	–	–	–	–	–	–	–	10,000	15,000	30,000	50,000	125,000
China Open	–	0	–	–	4,000	–	6,500	8,000	12,500	21,000	35,000	85,000
World Championship	0	–	–	8,000	–	12,000	16,000	25,000	37,500	75,000	160,000	375,000
