= Kritsanut Lertsattayathorn =

Thai snooker player

Personal information
- Born: 16 December 1988 (age 37) Bangkok, Thailand

Sport
- Country: Thailand
- Sport: Snooker
- Professional: 2016–2018
- Highest ranking: 89 (June 2017)
- Best ranking finish: Last 32 (x1)
Medal record
Men's snooker
Representing Thailand
Southeast Asian Games
Gold medal – first place	2019 Manila	Singles
Gold medal – first place	2023 Phnom Penh	6-Red Doubles

Kritsanut Lertsattayathorn (Thai: กฤษณัส เลิศสัตยาธร; born 16 December 1988 in Bangkok, Thailand) is a Thai former professional snooker player. He was the Asian Snooker Champion in 2016.

== Career ==
At the 2014 Six-red World Championship Lertsattayathorn defeated defending champion Mark Davis in the last 16 before being defeated 7–2 eventual winner Stephen Maguire in the semi-final. In 2016 Lertsattayathorn entered the Asian Snooker Championship in Doha as the 13th seed. Lertsattayathorn went on to reach the final and defeated Mohammed Shehab 8–2 to win the championship, as a result he was given a two-year card on the professional World Snooker Tour for the 2016–17 and 2017–18. At the 2016 English Open, Lertsattayathorn beat compatriot Boonyarit Keattikun 4–3 and Michael White 4–1. In the third round he was 3–2 up on Ricky Walden, but then lost the final two frames. Walden also beat Lertsattayathorn by a 4–3 scoreline in the second round of the Northern Ireland Open. He lost all five of his matches in the rest of the season.

== Performance and rankings timeline ==
Tournament	2014/ 15	2016/ 17	2017/ 18	2019/ 20	2022/ 23
Ranking	(Note: He was an amateur)	(Note: New players on the Main Tour don't have a ranking)	88		
Ranking tournaments
English Open	NH	3R	A	A	A
Northern Ireland Open	NH	2R	A	A	A
UK Championship	A	1R	A	A	A
Scottish Open	NH	1R	A	A	A
European Masters	NH	LQ	WD	A	A
German Masters	A	LQ	A	A	A
World Grand Prix	NR	DNQ	DNQ	DNQ	DNQ
Players Championship (Note: The event was called the Players Tour Championship Grand Final (2014/2015))	DNQ	DNQ	DNQ	DNQ	DNQ
Tour Championship	Tournament Not Held			DNQ	DNQ
World Championship	A	LQ	A	A	A
Non-ranking tournaments
Six-red World Championship	SF	2R	A	RR	RR
Former ranking tournaments
Paul Hunter Classic	MR	WD	A	NR	NH
Indian Open	A	A	WD	Not Held	
Shanghai Masters	A	LQ	A	NR	NH
China Open	A	LQ	A	Not Held	
International Championship	A	LQ	A	A	NH
World Open	NH	A	LQ	A	NH

Performance Table Legend
LQ	lost in the qualifying draw	#R	lost in the early rounds of the tournament (WR = Wildcard round, RR = Round robin)	QF	lost in the quarter-finals
SF	lost in the semi-finals	F	lost in the final	W	won the tournament
DNQ	did not qualify for the tournament	A	did not participate in the tournament	WD	withdrew from the tournament

NH / Not Held	means an event was not held.
NR / Non-Ranking Event	means an event is/was no longer a ranking event.
R / Ranking Event	means an event is/was a ranking event.
MR / Minor-Ranking Event	means an event is/was a minor-ranking event.

== Career finals ==
=== Pro-am finals: 1 (1 title) ===
Outcome	No.	Year	Championship	Opponent in the final	Score
Winner	1.	2019	Southeast Asian Games	(Malaysia) Moh Keen Hoo	4–2

=== Amateur finals: 1 (1 title) ===
Outcome	No.	Year	Championship	Opponent in the final	Score
Winner	1.	2016	Asian Amateur Championship	(United Arab Emirates) Mohammed Shehab	8–2
